= List of Allsvenskan top scorers =

The following is a list of top scorers in Allsvenskan, the highest Swedish division of football.

== List ==
Season	Top scorer	Club	Goals	Win #
1924–25	(Sweden) Filip Johansson	IFK Göteborg	39	1
1925–26	(Sweden) Carl-Erik Holmberg	Örgryte IS	29	1
1926–27	(Sweden) Albert Olsson	GAIS	24	1
1927–28	(Sweden) Carl-Erik Holmberg	Örgryte IS	27	2
1928–29	(Sweden) Harry Lundahl	Helsingborgs IF	31	1
1929–30	(Sweden) Harry Lundahl	Helsingborgs IF	26	2
1930–31	(Sweden) John Nilsson	GAIS	26	1
1931–32	(Sweden) Carl-Erik Holmberg	Örgryte IS	29	3
1932–33	(Sweden) Torsten Bunke	Helsingborgs IF	21	1
1933–34	(Sweden) Sven Jonasson	IF Elfsborg	20	1
1934–35	(Sweden) Harry Andersson	IK Sleipner	23	1
1935–36	(Sweden) Sven Jonasson	IF Elfsborg	24	2
1936–37	(Sweden) Olle Zetherlund	AIK	23	1
1937–38	(Sweden) Curt Hjelm	IK Sleipner	13	1
1938–39	(Sweden) Erik Persson (Sweden) Ove Andersson (Sweden) Yngve Lindgren	AIK; Malmö FF; Örgryte IS	16	1; 1; 1
1939–40	(Sweden) Anders Pålsson	Helsingborgs IF	17	1
1940–41	(Sweden) Stig Nyström	IK Brage	17	1
1941–42	(Sweden) Sven Jacobsson	GAIS	20	1
1942–43	(Sweden) Gunnar Nordahl	Degerfors IF	16	1
1943–44	(Sweden) Leif Larsson	IFK Göteborg	19	1
1944–45	(Sweden) Gunnar Nordahl	IFK Norrköping	27	2
1945–46	(Sweden) Gunnar Nordahl	IFK Norrköping	25	3
1946–47	(Sweden) Gunnar Gren	IFK Göteborg	18	1
1947–48	(Sweden) Gunnar Nordahl	IFK Norrköping	18	4
1948–49	(Sweden) Carl-Johan Franck	Helsingborgs IF	19	1
1949–50	(Sweden) Ingvar Rydell	Malmö FF	22	1
1950–51	(Sweden) Hasse Jeppson	Djurgårdens IF	17	1
1951–52	(Sweden) Karl-Alfred Jacobsson	GAIS	17	1
1952–53	(Sweden) Karl-Alfred Jacobsson	GAIS	24	2
1953–54	(Sweden) Karl-Alfred Jacobsson	GAIS	21	3
1954–55	(Sweden) Kurt Hamrin	AIK	22	1
1955–56	(Sweden) Sylve Bengtsson	Halmstads BK	22	1
1956–57	(Sweden) Harry Bild	IFK Norrköping	19	1
1957–58	(Sweden) Bertil Johansson (Sweden) Henry Källgren	IFK Göteborg; IFK Norrköping	27	1; 1
1959	(Sweden) Rune Börjesson	Örgryte IS	21	1
1960	(Sweden) Rune Börjesson	Örgryte IS	24	2
1961	(Sweden) Bertil Johansson	IFK Göteborg	20	2
1962	(Sweden) Leif Skiöld	Djurgårdens IF	21	1
1963	(Sweden) Lars Heinermann (Sweden) Bo Larsson	Degerfors IF; Malmö FF	17	1; 1
1964	(Sweden) Krister Granbom	Hälsingborgs IF	22	1
1965	(Sweden) Bo Larsson	Malmö FF	28	2
1966	(Sweden) Ove Kindvall	IFK Norrköping	20	1
1967	(Sweden) Dag Szepanski	Malmö FF	22	1
1968	(Sweden) Ove Eklund	Åtvidabergs FF	16	1
1969	(Sweden) Reine Almqvist	IFK Göteborg	16	1
1970	(Sweden) Bo Larsson	Malmö FF	16	3
1971	(Sweden) Roland Sandberg	Åtvidabergs FF	17	1
1972	(Sweden) Ralf Edström (Sweden) Roland Sandberg	Åtvidabergs FF; Åtvidabergs FF	16	1; 2
1973	(Sweden) Jan Mattsson	Östers IF	20	1
1974	(Sweden) Jan Mattsson	Östers IF	22	2
1975	(Sweden) Jan Mattsson	Östers IF	31	3
1976	(Sweden) Rutger Backe	Halmstads BK	21	1
1977	(Sweden) Reine Almqvist (Sweden) Mats Aronsson	IFK Göteborg; Landskrona BoIS	15	2; 1
1978	(Sweden) Tommy Berggren	Djurgårdens IF	19	1
1979	(Sweden) Mats Werner	Hammarby IF	14	1
1980	(Sweden) Billy Ohlsson	Hammarby IF	19	1
1981	(Sweden) Torbjörn Nilsson	IFK Göteborg	20	1
1982	(Sweden) Dan Corneliusson	IFK Göteborg	12	1
1983	(Sweden) Thomas Ahlström	IF Elfsborg	16	1
1984	(Sweden) Billy Ohlsson	Hammarby IF	14	2
1985	(Sweden) Sören Börjesson (Sweden) Peter Karlsson (England) Billy Lansdowne	Örgryte IS; Kalmar FF; Kalmar FF	10	1; 1; 1
1986	(Sweden) Johnny Ekström	IFK Göteborg	13	1
1987	(Sweden) Lasse Larsson	Malmö FF	19	1
1988	(Sweden) Martin Dahlin	Malmö FF	17	1
1989	(Sweden) Jan Hellström	IFK Norrköping	16	1
1990	(Sweden) Kaj Eskelinen	IFK Göteborg	10	1
1991	(Sweden) Kennet Andersson	IFK Göteborg	13	1
1992	(Sweden) Hans Eklund	Östers IF	16	1
1993	(Sweden) Henrik Bertilsson (Sweden) Mats Lilienberg	Halmstads BK; Trelleborgs FF	18	1; 1
1994	(Sweden) Niclas Kindvall	IFK Norrköping	23	1
1995	(Sweden) Niklas Skoog	Västra Frölunda IF	17	1
1996	(Sweden) Andreas Andersson	IFK Göteborg	19	1
1997	(Sweden) Mats Lilienberg (Sweden) Christer Mattiasson (Sweden) Dan Sahlin	Halmstads BK; IF Elfsborg; Örebro SK	14	2; 1; 1
1998	(Norway) Arild Stavrum	Helsingborgs IF	18	1
1999	(Sweden) Marcus Allbäck	Örgryte IS	15	1
2000	(Sweden) Fredrik Berglund	IF Elfsborg	18	1
2001	(Sweden) Stefan Selaković	Halmstads BK	15	1
2002	(Nigeria) Peter Ijeh	Malmö FF	24	1
2003	(Sweden) Niklas Skoog	Malmö FF	22	2
2004	(Sweden) Markus Rosenberg	Halmstads BK	14	1
2005	(Iceland) Gunnar Heiðar Þorvaldsson	Halmstads BK	16	1
2006	(Brazil) Ari	Kalmar FF	15	1
2007	(Benin) Razak Omotoyossi (Sweden) Marcus Berg	Helsingborgs IF; IFK Göteborg	14	1; 1
2008	(Sweden) Patrik Ingelsten	Kalmar FF	19	1
2009	(Brazil) Wánderson (Sweden) Tobias Hysén	GAIS; IFK Göteborg	18	1; 1
2010	(Sweden) Alexander Gerndt	Gefle IF / Helsingborgs IF	20	1
2011	(Sweden) Mathias Ranégie	BK Häcken / Malmö FF	21	1
2012	(Ghana) Waris Majeed	BK Häcken	23	1
2013	(Sweden) Imad Khalili	IFK Norrköping / Helsingborgs IF	15	1
2014	(Denmark) Lasse Vibe	IFK Göteborg	23	1
2015	(Sweden) Emir Kujović	IFK Norrköping	21	1
2016	(Nigeria) John Owoeri	BK Häcken	17	1
2017	(Sweden) Magnus Eriksson (Sweden) Kalle Holmberg	Djurgårdens IF; IFK Norrköping	14	1; 1
2018	(Brazil) Paulinho	BK Häcken	20	1
2019	(Sierra Leone) Mohamed Buya Turay	Djurgårdens IF	15	1
2020	(Sweden) Christoffer Nyman	IFK Norrköping	18	1
2021	(Nigeria) Samuel Adegbenro	IFK Norrköping	17	1
2022	(Sweden) Alexander Jeremejeff	BK Häcken	22	1
2023	(Sweden) Isaac Kiese Thelin	Malmö FF	16	1
2024	(Sweden) Nikola Vasić	IF Brommapojkarna	17	1
2025	(Ivory Coast) Ibrahim Diabate (Denmark) August Priske	GAIS; Djurgårdens IF	18	1; 1
