= Andreas Jakobsson =

Swedish footballer (born 1972)

Personal information
- Full name: Bo Janne Andreas Jakobsson
- Date of birth: 6 October 1972 (age 54)
- Place of birth: Lund, Sweden
- Height: 1.89 m (6 ft 2 in)
- Positions: Defender; defensive midfielder

Youth career
- 1978–1988: Teckomatorps SK
- 1988–1989: Landskrona BoIS

Senior career*
Years	Team	Apps	(Gls)
1990–1994	Landskrona BoIS	99	(2)
1995–2000	Helsingborgs IF	135	(5)
2000–2003	Hansa Rostock	99	(4)
2003–2004	Brøndby IF	34	(5)
2004–2005	Southampton	27	(2)
2005–2007	Helsingborgs IF	58	(5)
Total		452	(23)

International career
1992–1993	Sweden U21	3	(0)
1995–1997	Sweden B	3	(0)
1996–2004	Sweden	36	(2)
- * Club domestic league appearances and goals

Bo Janne Andreas Jakobsson (Swedish pronunciation: [anˈdrêːas ˈjɑ̂ːkɔbˌsɔn]; born 6 October 1972) is a Swedish former professional footballer who played as a defender and defensive midfielder. Starting off his professional career with Landskrona BoIS in 1990, he went on to also represent Helsingborgs IF, Hansa Rostock, Brøndby IF, and Southampton before retiring at Helsingborg in 2007. He played 36 international matches for the Sweden national team, and was a squad player at the 2002 FIFA World Cup and UEFA Euro 2004.

== Club career ==
Born in Lund and raised in Teckomatorp, Jakobsson started his senior career as a central defender for nearby club Landskrona BoIS in 1990. He helped Landskrona win promotion for the top-flight Swedish Allsvenskan championship in 1993. Landskrona were relegated again following the 1994 Allsvenskan season, and Jakobsson moved on to Allsvenskan club Helsingborgs IF. He instantly commanded a place in Helsingborg's starting line-up, and made his debut in the Sweden national team in February 1996. Together with Ola Nilsson, he formed the strongest central defence in Allsvenskan for several years and in 1999, HIF was finally able to win Allsvenskan after 58 years of waiting. Without the solid defence controlled by Jakobsson, many doubt it would have been possible.

After winning the 1999 Allsvenskan championship with HIF, he moved abroad to play for Hansa Rostock in the Bundesliga in the summer 2000. He played three seasons at Rostock, missing only three of 102 league games for the club. In July 2003, Jakobsson left Rostock to play for Brøndby IF in the Danish Superliga.

He played five games in the 2004–05 Superliga, which Brøndby would go on to win, before moving to English club Southampton F.C. in the FA Premier League, scoring twice against Crystal Palace and Middlesbrough. At the end of the season, Southampton were relegated, and Jakobsson returned to play for Helsingborgs IF. After the 2007 season, he retired from professional football.

== International career ==
Jakobsson was called up for the Swedish squad for the 2002 FIFA World Cup, and played full-time in all four games for Sweden, replacing the injured captain Patrik Andersson. He was selected to represent Sweden at the 2004 European Championship, and played full-time in the tournament, as Sweden reached the quarter-finals. He was a designated penalty taker in the penalty shoot out against the Netherlands, but refused to take his penalty. Instead, Olof Mellberg took a penalty which Dutch keeper Edwin van der Sar saved and Sweden were consequently eliminated. Jakobsson announced his retirement from international football after the tournament.

== Career statistics ==
=== Club ===
Appearances and goals by club, season and competition
Club	Season	League			Cup		Continental		Other		Total	
Club	Season	Division	Apps	Goals	Apps	Goals	Apps	Goals	Apps	Goals	Apps	Goals
Landskrona	1990	Division 1 Södra	5	0			–					
Landskrona	1991	Division 1 Södra	24	0			–					
Landskrona	1992	Division 1 Södra	28	0			–					
Landskrona	1993	Division 1 Södra	25	2			–					
Landskrona	1994	Allsvenskan	17	0			–					
Landskrona	Total		99	2			–					
Helsingborgs IF	1995	Allsvenskan	25	2								
Helsingborgs IF	1996	Allsvenskan	26	0								
Helsingborgs IF	1997	Allsvenskan	25	1								
Helsingborgs IF	1998	Allsvenskan	26	1								
Helsingborgs IF	1999	Allsvenskan	25	0								
Helsingborgs IF	2000	Allsvenskan	8	1								
Helsingborgs IF	Total		135	5								
Hansa Rostock	2000–01	Bundesliga	34	1								
Hansa Rostock	2001–02	Bundesliga	32	2								
Hansa Rostock	2002–03	Bundesliga	33	1								
Hansa Rostock	Total		99	4								
Brøndby IF	2003–04	Danish Superliga	29	4								
Brøndby IF	2004–05	Danish Superliga	5	1								
Brøndby IF	Total		34	5								
Southampton	2004–05	Premier League	27	2								
Helsingborgs IF	2005	Allsvenskan	11	0								
Helsingborgs IF	2006	Allsvenskan	21	0								
Helsingborgs IF	2007	Allsvenskan	26	5								
Helsingborgs IF	Total		58	5								
Career total			452	23								

=== International ===
Appearances and goals by national team and year
National team	Year	Apps	Goals
Sweden	1996	1	0
Sweden	1997	5	0
Sweden	1998	2	0
Sweden	1999	2	0
Sweden	2000	0	0
Sweden	2001	1	0
Sweden	2002	11	0
Sweden	2003	7	1
Sweden	2004	7	1
Total		36	2

Scores and results list Sweden's goal tally first, score column indicates score after each Jakobsson goal.

List of international goals scored by Andreas Jakobsson
No.	Date	Venue	Opponent	Score	Result	Competition	Ref.
1	6 September 2003	Ullevi, Gothenburg, Sweden	San Marino	2–0	5–0	UEFA Euro 2004 qualifier	
2	5 June 2004	Råsunda Stadium, Solna, Sweden	Poland	2–0	3–1	Friendly	

== Honours ==
Landskrona BoIS

- Division 1 Södra: 1993

Helsingborgs IF

- Allsvenskan: 1999
- Svenska Cupen: 1997–98, 2006

Brøndby IF

- Danish Superliga: 2004–05
