= Håkan Mild =

Swedish footballer (born 1971)

Personal information
- Full name: Stig Håkan Mild
- Date of birth: 14 June 1971 (age 55)
- Place of birth: Trollhättan, Sweden
- Height: 1.82 m (6 ft 0 in)
- Position: Central midfielder

Senior career*
Years	Team	Apps	(Gls)
1989–1993	IFK Göteborg	92	(9)
1993–1995	Servette	21	(1)
1995–1996	IFK Göteborg	23	(5)
1996–1998	Real Sociedad	50	(1)
1998–2001	IFK Göteborg	66	(6)
2001–2002	Wimbledon	9	(0)
2002–2005	IFK Göteborg	65	(6)
Total		326	(28)

International career
1987	Sweden U16	2	(0)
1988–1989	Sweden U18	9	(3)
1990–1992	Sweden U21/O	23	(4)
1991–2001	Sweden	74	(8)
Medal record
Representing Sweden
Men's Football
FIFA World Cup
Bronze medal – third place	1994 United States	Team
- * Club domestic league appearances and goals

Stig Håkan Mild (born 14 June 1971) is a Swedish former professional footballer who played as a central midfielder. He is best remembered for his time with IFK Göteborg, with which he won four Swedish Championships. A full international between 1991 and 2001, he won a total of 74 caps for the Sweden national team and was a part of the Sweden team that finished third at the 1994 FIFA World Cup. He also represented his country at the 1992 Summer Olympics and UEFA Euro 2000. He was the sporting director of IFK Göteborg between 2006 and 2014, and club director between 2021 and 2025.

== Club career ==
Born in Trollhättan, Västra Götaland, Mild started his career with the local club Trollhättans FK, and was early on scouted by the then leading Swedish club IFK Göteborg which he joined in 1988. He made his debut in the first team of IFK Göteborg the same year, in a friendly match against IF Elfsborg, 29 September. He played his first league game the following season, when he came on as a substitute against Halmstads BK, 26 July. He then scored his first goal in a competitive match in 1990, and became Swedish champion for the first time that same year, playing in a majority of the club's matches during the season.

He became a regular in the team and won another championship title the next season, as well as winning Svenska Cupen. He also scored his first goal in Allsvenskan in 1991, and played four matches in the European Cup. He was at the time a member of the Swedish Olympic team that competed at the 1992 Summer Olympics, where he played all four matches. He returned to European football and played all ten matches in the 1992–93 UEFA Champions League, against amongst others A.C. Milan and FC Porto. Mild also scored a goal against Lech Poznań in the qualifying round of the tournament. He became Swedish champion with IFK again in 1993.

Håkan Mild then moved abroad to Swiss club Servette FC where he won the Swiss Super League title the first season. He then played in the 1994 World Cup, where he was substituted on in two games, and played the last three games—quarter-final, semi-final and third place match—from start scoring one goal and assisting one. He returned to Servette FC to play another season but his first visit on the continent was not very successful and he returned to IFK Göteborg for the second half of the 1995 season. He led the club to another Swedish Championship the following season, but left the club again, this time to play in Spain and Real Sociedad.

He played 49 matches in Primera Division over two seasons, and was a member of the squad that finished third in 1997–98, the club's best result during the 1990s. He returned home to Gothenburg and IFK a second time, but had to tamper with injury problems the second half of 1998. He played another three seasons before trying his luck in another club abroad, this time Wimbledon F.C. in England. This proved to be his least successful stay abroad, playing only nine matches over a little more than one season. The low, but undisclosed, fee for his transfer to Wimbledon gave Mild a bad conscience, so he chose to not accept the almost 500,000 SEK (around US$50,000 at that time) of match bonuses he had not yet been paid. This, amongst other things, has given Håkan Mild a special status amongst the IFK fans.

He returned in time to help IFK stay in Allsvenskan during the worst season of the club since 1976—when the club played in Division 2—as they barely avoided relegation by winning a play-off after the season's end. Mild then played another three seasons, partially interrupted by injury problems. He played his last match 11 December 2005 home against FC Lyn Oslo in the Royal League tournament, and his name was sung during all 90 minutes of the match, as a final farewell. He then assumed the position of director of sports in the club.

He played a total of 459 matches over 18 years for IFK Göteborg, and is regarded as one of the club's greatest players ever not only due to his work on the field, but also for his club spirit, leader qualities and work ethics. He has only represented one Swedish club on higher levels, and statements such as "IFK is my home" and "IFK has always meant so much to me that it sometimes has become a problem" has only cemented the view on him amongst supporters as one of the greatest.

== International career ==
He played 74 games for the Sweden national team, scoring eight goals, and besides participation in the 1994 FIFA World Cup and the 1992 Summer Olympics, he also played in Euro 2000.

== Personal life ==
In 2001, he did a running test called the Pacer test and scored a record high of 19.2 which is the best ever recorded.

== Career statistics ==
=== Club ===
Appearances and goals by club, season and competition
Club	Season	League			Cup		Continental		Other		Total	
Club	Season	Division	Apps	Goals	Apps	Goals	Apps	Goals	Apps	Goals	Apps	Goals
IFK Göteborg	1988	Allsvenskan	0	0	0	0	–		2	0	2	0
IFK Göteborg	1989	Allsvenskan	1	0	0	0	–		11	1	12	1
IFK Göteborg	1990	Allsvenskan	19	0	1	1	–		21	3	41	4
IFK Göteborg	1991	Allsvenskan	28	2	6	0	4	0	20	4	58	6
IFK Göteborg	1992	Allsvenskan	27	2	1	0	6	1	18	1	52	4
IFK Göteborg	1993	Allsvenskan	21	5	1	0	4	0	17	4	43	9
IFK Göteborg	Total		96	9	9	1	14	1	89	13	208	24
Servette	1993–94	Nationalliga A	11	1			–				11	1
Servette	1994–95	Nationalliga A	10	0			1	0	11	0	22	0
Servette	Total		21	1			1	0	11	0	33	1
IFK Göteborg	1995	Allsvenskan	9	2	1	0	0	0	6	1	16	3
IFK Göteborg	1996	Allsvenskan	14	3	3	1	2	0	8	1	27	5
IFK Göteborg	Total		23	5	4	1	2	0	14	2	43	8
Real Sociedad	1996–97	La Liga	25	1	1	0	–		–		26	1
Real Sociedad	1997–98	La Liga	24	0	3	0	–		–		27	0
Real Sociedad	Total		49	1	4	0	0	0	–		53	1
IFK Göteborg	1998	Allsvenskan	10	1	2	1	3	0	1	0	16	2
IFK Göteborg	1999	Allsvenskan	21	0	6	0	5	1	6	0	38	1
IFK Göteborg	2000	Allsvenskan	23	2	6	4	0	0	2	1	31	7
IFK Göteborg	2001	Allsvenskan	12	3	2	2	0	0	1	1	15	6
IFK Göteborg	Total		66	6	16	7	8	1	10	2	100	16
Wimbledon	2001–02	First Division	9	0			–		–		9	0
Wimbledon	2002–03	First Division	0	0			–		–		0	0
Wimbledon	Total		9	0	?	?	–		–		9	0
IFK Göteborg	2002	Allsvenskan	8	1	0	0	0	0	0	0	8	1
IFK Göteborg	2003	Allsvenskan	18	1	3	1	0	0	4	0	25	2
IFK Göteborg	2004	Allsvenskan	23	2	4	0	3	0	2	0	32	2
IFK Göteborg	2005	Allsvenskan	18	2	1	0	14	2	10	1	43	5
IFK Göteborg	Total		67	6	8	1	17	2	27	2	108	10
Career total			348	29	40	10	42	4	129	18	571	61

=== International ===
Appearances and goals by national team and year
National team	Year	Apps	Goals
Sweden	1991	6	1
Sweden	1992	3	0
Sweden	1993	1	1
Sweden	1994	11	2
Sweden	1995	5	2
Sweden	1996	8	0
Sweden	1997	9	0
Sweden	1998	5	0
Sweden	1999	8	0
Sweden	2000	9	0
Sweden	2001	9	2
Total		74	8

Scores and results list Sweden's goal tally first, score column indicates score after each Mild goal.

List of international goals scored by Håkan Mild
No.	Date	Venue	Opponent	Score	Result	Competition	Ref.
1	17 April 1991	Nikos Goumas Stadium, Athens, Greece	Greece	2–1	2–2	Friendly	
2	10 November 1993	Ernst-Happel-Stadion, Leopoldstadt, Austria	Austria	1–0	1–1	1994 FIFA World Cup qualifier	
3	24 February 1994	Bulldog Stadium, Fresno, California, United States	Mexico	1–2	1–2	Friendly	
4	16 July 1994	Rose Bowl, Pasadena, California, United States	Bulgaria	2–0	4–0	1994 FIFA World Cup	
5	8 June 1995	Elland Road, Leeds, England	England	1–0	3–3	Umbro Cup	
6	8 June 1995	Elland Road, Leeds, England	England	2–0	3–3	Umbro Cup	
7	28 February 2001	National Stadium Ta' Qali, Ta' Qali, Malta	Malta	3–0	3–0	Friendly	
8	10 November 2001	Old Trafford, Manchester, England	England	1–1	1–1	Friendly	

== Honours ==
IFK Göteborg

- Allsvenskan: 1990, 1991, 1993, 1996
- Svenska Cupen: 1991
- Royal League runner-up: 2004–05

Sweden

- FIFA World Cup third-place: 1994

Individual

- Årets Ärkeängel: 1999
