= Marcus Allbäck =

Swedish footballer and coach (born 1973)

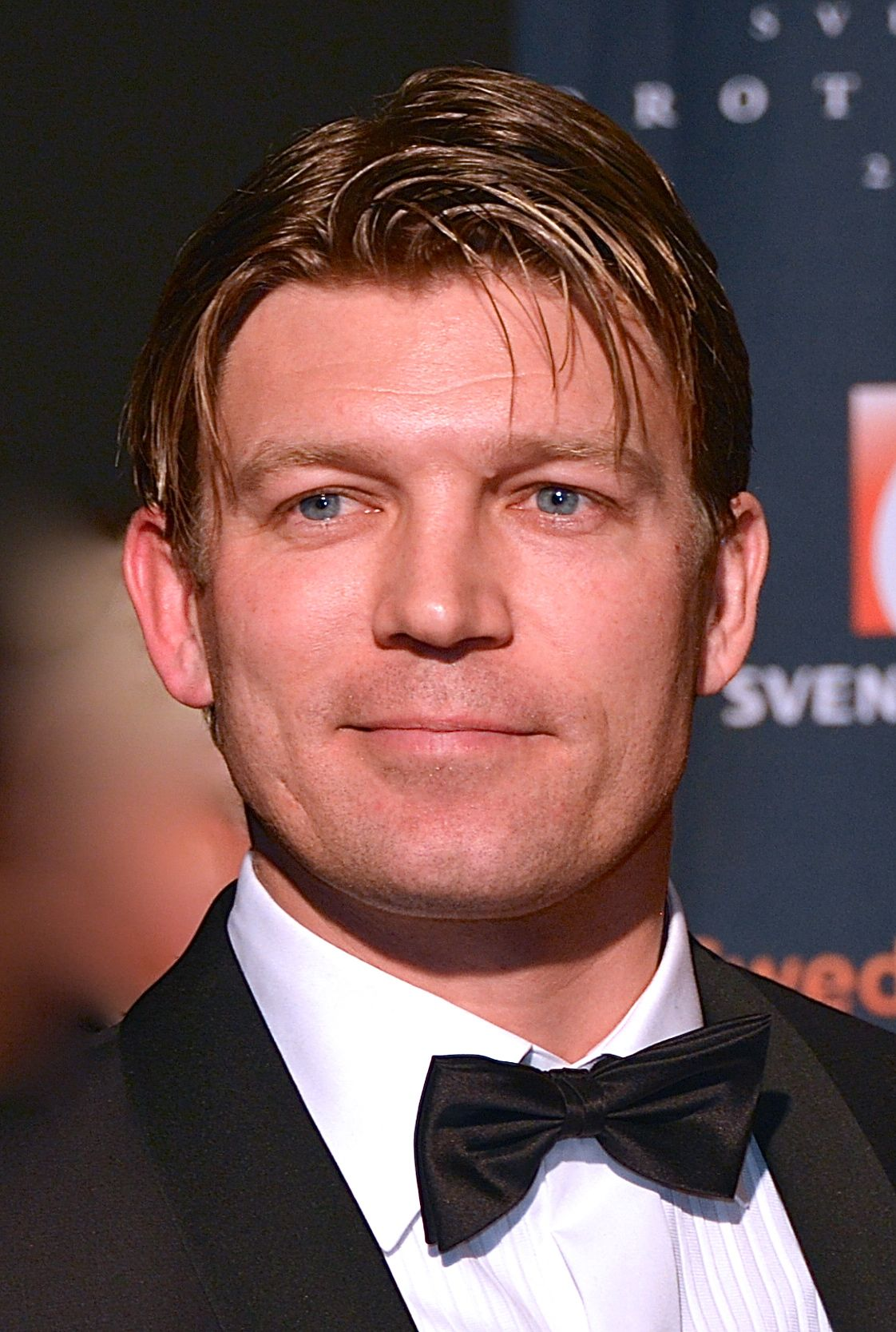
- Allbäck at the Swedish Sports Awards in 2013

Personal information
- Full name: Marcus Christian Allbäck
- Date of birth: 5 July 1973 (age 53)
- Place of birth: Gothenburg, Sweden
- Height: 1.80 m (5 ft 11 in)
- Position: Striker

Senior career*
Years	Team	Apps	(Gls)
1992–2000	Örgryte IS	203	(86)
1997	→ Lyngby BK (loan)	4	(1)
1998	→ Bari (loan)	16	(0)
2000–2002	Heerenveen	48	(25)
2002–2004	Aston Villa	35	(6)
2004–2005	Hansa Rostock	23	(4)
2005–2008	Copenhagen	85	(34)
2008–2009	Örgryte IS	30	(8)
2011	Örgryte IS	1	(0)
Total		445	(164)

International career
1999–2008	Sweden	74	(30)

Managerial career
- 2009–2016: Sweden (assistant manager)
- * Club domestic league appearances and goals

Marcus Christian Allbäck (Swedish pronunciation: [ˈmǎrːkɵs ˈâlːbɛk]; born 5 July 1973) is a Swedish former professional footballer who played as a striker. He was known for his sharp finishing ability and represented clubs in Sweden, Denmark, Italy, the Netherlands, England, and Germany during a career that spanned between 1992 and 2009. A full international between 1999 and 2008, he won 74 caps for the Sweden national team and scored 30 goals. He represented Sweden at three UEFA European Championships (2000, 2004, and 2008) as well as two FIFA World Cups (2002 and 2006).

After his playing career he served as an assistant coach for the Sweden national team between 2009 and 2016.

== Club career ==
=== Early career ===
Born in Gothenburg, Allbäck started his professional career with Örgryte IS. He then proceeded to have two modest loan stints abroad, with Lyngby Boldklub and A.S. Bari of Serie A, before rejoining his first club.

In 2000, he joined SC Heerenveen of the Eredivisie, before moving to Aston Villa for £2 million in 2002, scoring on his debut against FC Zurich in the UEFA Intertoto Cup. He was not a regular for the Premier League club, due to Darius Vassell and Juan Pablo Ángel. At the end of his contract, he joined Hansa Rostock in the summer of 2004.

=== F.C. Copenhagen ===
In the summer of 2005, aged 32, Allbäck signed with F.C. Copenhagen. On 1 November 2006, he scored the winning goal in a 1–0 UEFA Champions League group stage game against Manchester United. In that match, he was also awarded the fans' Man of the Match award. 20 days later he also scored against S.L. Benfica at Estádio da Luz – a match lost 3–1. Allbäck scored again in the last group stage match against Celtic at Parken in a 3–1 win. After the final home game of the Danish Superliga 2006–07 season, he was presented with the fans' Player of the Year award, as the side emerged back-to-back champions, and the striker netted 11 league goals.

In August 2007, Allbäck scored a late away equaliser against Beitar Jerusalem in the second leg of the second round Champions League qualifier in extra time, to keep Copenhagen's group stage dreams alive, although the side would eventually bow out to Benfica in the next round.

=== Return to Sweden and retirement ===
On 1 July 2008, Allbäck returned to Sweden and Örgryte, his third spell at the club.

On 14 December 2009, after Örgryte IS was relegated from Allsvenskan, Allbäck announced his retirement from football.

After Sweden's victory against the Netherlands, it was official that Allbäck would participate in Örgryte's next home game against Motala, He came on in the 69th minute but could not affect the game.

== International career ==
Allbäck made his debut for the national side on 27 November 1999 in a friendly against South Africa. He was selected for Sweden's Euro 2000 squad, but was the only outfield player who did not play for Sweden in the tournament. By the 2002 FIFA World Cup, Allbäck had established himself in the starting line-up after an impressive display in the qualification. However, he had a disappointing tournament with no goals. At Euro 2004, the 2006 World Cup, and Euro 2008, Allbäck was mostly used as a substitute.

On 20 June 2006, during the 2006 World Cup, Allbäck helped Sweden earn a 2–2 draw against England by netting their first goal. This goal by Allbäck was the 2000th goal scored in the history of the World Cup. On 6 September, he scored twice to help propel Sweden past visitors Liechtenstein 3–1 in the second of their 2008 European Championship qualifying matches.

On 6 June 2007, during Euro 2008 qualifiers, Allbäck scored a highly surreal goal against Iceland when an opponent, Ívar Ingimarsson, gave him the ball incorrectly thinking a free kick had been awarded.

After Sweden's group stage exit from Euro 2008 (in which he played as a second-half substitute against Russia in Innsbruck), Allbäck announced that he would retire from the national team, ending his international career with 74 caps with 30 goals.

Allbäck worked for SVT as a commentator during the FIFA Confederations Cup 2009 in South Africa.

== Post-playing career ==
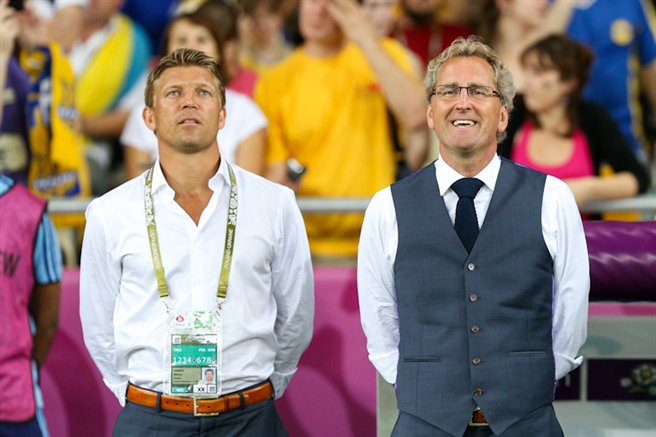
Allbäck and Swedish coach Erik Hamrén in 2012

On 7 November 2009, Allbäck was named as the new assistant coach of the Sweden men's national football team. He stepped down from this position in 2016, following Sweden's disappointing Euro 2016 campaign. He started his career as a football agent later the same year.

== Career statistics ==
=== Club ===
Appearances and goals by club, season and competition
Club	Season	League			National Cup		League Cup		Europe		Other		Total	
Club	Season	Division	Apps	Goals	Apps	Goals	Apps	Goals	Apps	Goals	Apps	Goals	Apps	Goals
Örgryte IS	1992	Division 2 Mellersta Götaland/Kvalsvenskan Västra	24	10			–							
Örgryte IS	1993	Allsvenskan	20	4			–							
Örgryte IS	1994	Division 1 Södra	25	19			–							
Örgryte IS	1995	Allsvenskan	22	4			–							
Örgryte IS	1996	Allsvenskan	24	8			–		1	0				
Örgryte IS	1997	Allsvenskan	24	9										
Örgryte IS	1998	Allsvenskan	12	3			–							
Örgryte IS	1999	Allsvenskan	26	15			–							
Örgryte IS	2000	Allsvenskan	26	16			–		2	0				
Örgryte IS	Total		203	88			–		3	0				
Lyngby Boldklub (loan)	1997–98	Danish Superliga	4	1			–							
Bari (loan)	1997–98	Serie A	16	0			–							
Heerenveen	2000–01	Eredivisie	16	10			–		–					
Heerenveen	2001–02	Eredivisie	32	15			–		2	3				
Heerenveen	Total		48	25			–		2	3				
Aston Villa	2002–03	Premier League	20	5										
Aston Villa	2003–04	Premier League	15	1			2	0						
Aston Villa	2004–05	Premier League	0	0										
Aston Villa	Total		35	6										
Hansa Rostock	2004–05	Bundesliga	23	4	3	0	–		–					
Copenhagen	2005–06	Danish Superliga	30	15			–		1	0				
Copenhagen	2006–07	Danish Superliga	26	11			–		9	3				
Copenhagen	2007–08	Danish Superliga	29	8			–		10	4				
Copenhagen	Total		85	34			–		20	7				
Örgryte IS	2008	Superettan	12	5			–		–					
Örgryte IS	2009	Allsvenskan	18	3			–		–					
Örgryte IS	Total		30	8			–		3	0				
Örgryte IS	2011	Division 1 Södra	1	0			–		–					
Career total			445	166										

=== International ===
Appearances and goals by national team and year
National team	Year	Apps	Goals
Sweden	1999	1	0
Sweden	2000	4	1
Sweden	2001	9	6
Sweden	2002	13	4
Sweden	2003	9	5
Sweden	2004	11	7
Sweden	2005	7	0
Sweden	2006	9	4
Sweden	2007	7	3
Sweden	2008	4	0
Total		74	30

Scores and results list Sweden's goal tally first, score column indicates score after each Allbäck goal.

List of international goals scored by Marcus Allbäck
No.	Date	Venue	Opponent	Score	Result	Competition
1	31 January 2000	La Manga Club, La Manga, Spain	Denmark	1–0	1–0	2000–01 Nordic Football Championship
2	28 March 2001	Zimbru Stadium, Chişinău, Moldova	Moldova	1–0	2–0	2002 FIFA World Cup qualification
3	28 March 2001	Zimbru Stadium, Chişinău, Moldova	Moldova	2–0	2–0	2002 FIFA World Cup qualification
4	2 June 2001	Råsunda, Stockholm, Sweden	Slovakia	1–0	2–0	2002 FIFA World Cup qualification
5	2 June 2001	Råsunda, Stockholm, Sweden	Slovakia	2–0	2–0	2002 FIFA World Cup qualification
6	6 June 2001	Ullevi, Gothenburg, Sweden	Moldova	5–0	6–0	2002 FIFA World Cup qualification
7	15 August 2001	Råsunda, Stockholm, Sweden	South Africa	2–0	3–0	Friendly
8	27 March 2002	Malmö Stadion, Malmö, Sweden	Switzerland	1–0	1–1	Friendly
9	25 May 2002	National Stadium, Tokyo, Japan	Japan	1–0	1–1	Friendly
10	16 October 2002	Ullevi, Gothenburg, Sweden	Portugal	2–0	2–3	Friendly
11	20 November 2002	Na Stínadlech, Teplice, Czech Republic	Czech Republic	3–3	3–3	Friendly
12	2 April 2003	Népstadion, Budapest, Hungary	Hungary	1–0	2–1	UEFA Euro 2004 qualifying
13	2 April 2003	Népstadion, Budapest, Hungary	Hungary	2–1	2–1	UEFA Euro 2004 qualifying
14	7 June 2003	Stadio Serravalle, San Marino, San Marino	San Marino	2–0	6–0	UEFA Euro 2004 qualifying
15	7 June 2003	Stadio Serravalle, San Marino, San Marino	San Marino	6–0	6–0	UEFA Euro 2004 qualifying
16	11 June 2003	Råsunda, Stockholm, Sweden	Poland	2–0	3–0	UEFA Euro 2004 qualifying
17	28 May 2004	Ratina Stadion, Tampere, Finland	Finland	2–1	3–1	Friendly
18	28 May 2004	Ratina Stadion, Tampere, Finland	Finland	3–1	3–1	Friendly
19	5 June 2004	Råsunda, Stockholm, Sweden	Poland	3–0	3–1	Friendly
20	14 June 2004	José Alvalade Stadium, Lisbon, Portugal	Bulgaria	5–0	5–0	UEFA Euro 2004
21	13 October 2004	Laugardalsvöllur, Reykjavík, Iceland	Iceland	2–0	4–1	2006 FIFA World Cup qualification
22	17 November 2004	Easter Road Stadium, Edinburgh, Scotland	Scotland	1–0	4–1	Friendly
23	17 November 2004	Easter Road Stadium, Edinburgh, Scotland	Scotland	2–0	4–1	Friendly
24	20 June 2006	RheinEnergieStadion, Cologne, Germany	England	1–1	2–2	2006 FIFA World Cup
25	6 September 2006	Ullevi, Gothenburg, Sweden	Liechtenstein	1–0	3–1	UEFA Euro 2008 qualification
26	6 September 2006	Ullevi, Gothenburg, Sweden	Liechtenstein	2–1	3–1	UEFA Euro 2008 qualification
27	7 October 2006	Råsunda, Stockholm, Sweden	Spain	2–0	2–0	UEFA Euro 2008 qualification
28	6 June 2007	Råsunda, Stockholm, Sweden	Iceland	1–0	5–0	UEFA Euro 2008 qualification
29	6 June 2007	Råsunda, Stockholm, Sweden	Iceland	5–0	5–0	UEFA Euro 2008 qualification
30	21 November 2007	Råsunda, Stockholm, Sweden	Latvia	1–0	2–1	UEFA Euro 2008 qualification

== Honours ==
F.C. Copenhagen

- Danish Superliga: 2005–06, 2006–07

Örgryte IS

- Svenska Cupen: 2000

Individual

- Allsvenskan top scorer: 1999
- Stor Grabb: 2002
- F.C. Copenhagen Player of the Year: 2007
