= Jesper Blomqvist =

Swedish footballer (born 1974)

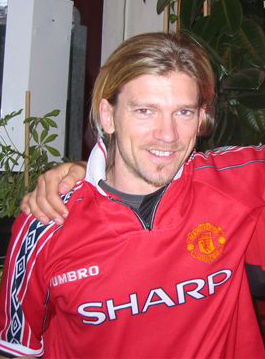
- Blomqvist in 2005

Personal information
- Full name: Lars Jesper Blomqvist
- Date of birth: 5 February 1974 (age 52)
- Place of birth: Tavelsjö, Sweden
- Height: 1.76 m (5 ft 9 in)
- Position: Left midfielder

Youth career
- Tavelsjö AIK

Senior career*
Years	Team	Apps	(Gls)
1992–1993	Umeå	38	(8)
1993–1996	IFK Göteborg	73	(18)
1996–1997	AC Milan	20	(1)
1997–1998	Parma	28	(1)
1998–2001	Manchester United	25	(1)
2001–2002	Everton	15	(1)
2002–2003	Charlton Athletic	3	(0)
2003–2005	Djurgården	9	(1)
2008	Enköping	10	(1)
2010	Hammarby IF	6	(0)
Total		227	(32)

International career
1989–1990	Sweden U16	15	(0)
1990–1991	Sweden U18	12	(1)
1993–1995	Sweden U23	12	(3)
1994–2002	Sweden	30	(0)

Managerial career
- 2008: Enköping (player–coach)
- 2009–2010: Hammarby IF (player–assistant)
Medal record
Representing Sweden
Men's Football
FIFA World Cup
Bronze medal – third place	1994 United States	Team
- * Club domestic league appearances and goals

Lars Jesper Blomqvist (Swedish pronunciation: [lɑːʂ ˈjɛ̌sːpɛr ˈblʊ̂mːkvɪst]; born 5 February 1974) is a Swedish former professional footballer who played as a left midfielder.

Most recently he was the playing assistant manager of Superettan side Hammarby from December 2009 to November 2010. He played at IFK Göteborg, where he won four straight Allsvenskan league titles between 1993 and 1996, and Manchester United, where he was part of the team that won the treble in 1999, consisting of the Premier League, FA Cup and UEFA Champions League. He returned to Swedish football in 2003 with Djurgården, where he won his final Allsvenskan title, before initially retiring in 2005. An injury crisis prompted a playing return for Enköping in 2008.

A full international between 1994 and 2002, Blomqvist won 30 caps for the Sweden national team and helped them to third place at the 1994 FIFA World Cup in the United States.

== Club career ==
=== Swedish football ===
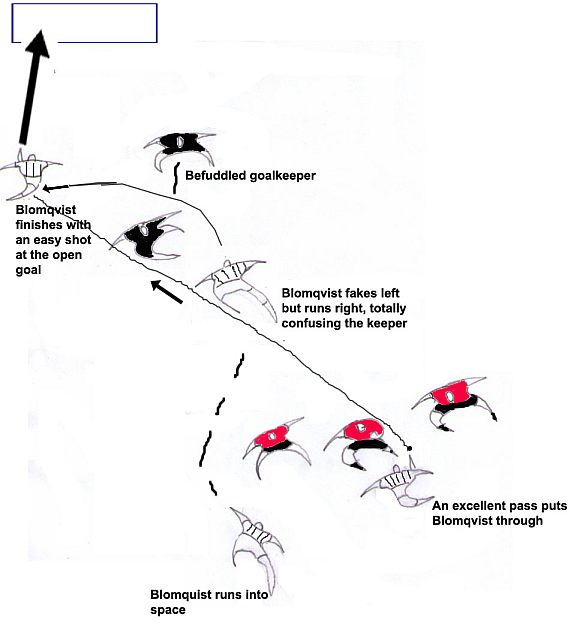
Image describing Blomqvist's goal against Helsingborgs IF in 1995

After an early spell at Tavelsjö, Blomqvist signed for then recently formed Umeå in 1992. In the spring portion of his first season for the club, he helped them to the Division 2 Norra Norrland title, promoting the club to Division 1 Norra for the autumn. At the time this was the second tier of Swedish football. Subsequently, he signed for IFK Göteborg on 11 September 1993. Blomqvist played a part in the club's Allsvenskan win that year. He scored eight goals in 24 league appearances en route to the league title in 1994. Furthermore, he scored in the club's 3–1 win over Manchester United in the Champions League. This performance caught the eye of United manager Alex Ferguson and helped the team qualify for the quarter-finals of the tournament. Another title followed in 1995, with Blomqvist's goal against Helsingborg, when he performed a variant of the Pelé runaround move, voted goal of the season. In his last season for Göteborg, he played against former club Umeå, who had reached the Allsvenskan for the first time in their history. In 1996, Blomqvist was voted Fan's Player of the Year and Midfielder of the Year. At the end of the 1996 season, he signed for newly crowned Serie A champions AC Milan.

=== Serie A ===
In his first season of Italian football, Milan failed to win a trophy, and Blomqvist often sat on the bench. He nearly decided against going to Old Trafford because he did not want a repeat of this season. The defending champions had an equally disappointing season, finishing eleventh in Serie A and failing to qualify for European football. Blomqvist was subsequently sold to Serie A runners up Parma in the summer of 1997. Blomqvist enjoyed more regular football, although the club finished sixth in the league and missed out on the knockout stages of the Champions League. The Swede's sole league goal for the club was scored in a 4–0 win over Napoli at Stadio San Paolo.

=== Premier League ===
Manchester United purchased Blomqvist as a backup to Ryan Giggs in the early stages of the 1998–99 season, for a fee of £4.4 million, three years after manager Alex Ferguson had first attempted to sign him for United from IFK Gothenburg. He featured in enough games to win a Premier League winner's medal in the 1999 season, scoring his only goal for the club in a 4–1 away win against Everton. He received an FA Cup winners medal despite being an unused substitute in the final. He did, however, start against Bayern Munich in the Champions League final. He came close to scoring before eventually being replaced by Teddy Sheringham, who later scored a late equaliser after Bayern's early goal. United went on to win the match 2–1.

Due to a serious knee injury suffered soon after the Champions League final, Blomqvist did not play football in the next two seasons, which resulted in Manchester United deciding not to renew his contract (during his time out, due to this injury, he did media work for MUTV, United's in-house television channel, and presented his own cookery show called "Cooking With Jesper"). He remained on a week-to-week deal at Old Trafford before finally leaving when Ferguson persuaded Everton manager Walter Smith to offer the Swedish international a short-term contract at Goodison Park, from November 2001 until the end of the season. Blomqvist played on the wings opposite compatriot Niclas Alexandersson, and scored his first goal for Everton against Sunderland in January 2002. Injury problems persisted, however, and new manager David Moyes allowed him to leave the club in June 2002. He had a trial at Middlesbrough, but was unhappy with the club's handling of the situation, labelling it "a bit unprofessional". Instead he signed for Alan Curbishley's Charlton Athletic on a free transfer. His spell at The Valley was even briefer, and he made just three league appearances for the South London side before calling time on an injury-hit five seasons in England.

=== Return to Sweden ===
Again struggling with injury, Blomqvist returned to his native Sweden after only four games with Charlton. He signed on a short-term deal with Djurgården. This proved unpopular among supporters of IFK Göteborg, who labelled him "Judas". Göteborg fans considered the decision to join Djurgården instead of them a betrayal. Blomqvist played a part as the side became Swedish champions that year. Injury problems, however, restricted him to only nine league appearances. As during the stint with Manchester United, he remained at the club for another two seasons, before finally deciding to retire due to injury in 2005.

Blomqvist joined Enköping as a coach in 2008 and went on to make a playing return in the Superettan, the second tier of Swedish football. A shortage of players at the club due to injury forced Blomqvist's playing return. The player shortage was highlighted when Blomqvist was sent off in his second game for the club. This resulted in a suspension for Blomqvist, and Enköping only having fifteen players available for the following match. On 15 September 2008, he scored his first professional goal in five years in a 1–0 win against IK Sirius. In total, he made ten Superettan appearances, but was unable to save Enköping from relegation to Division 1 for the 2009 season. He left Enköping after the season and later signed a contract with newly relegated Hammarby as assistant manager to Michael Borgqvist.

In 2010, Blomqvist played again, coming on as a substitute in the 85th minute for Hammarby against Trelleborg in the Swedish Cup, being one of very few coaches actually playing a game for their team. After a rough period at the club, he left Hammarby in a mutual consent in November 2010.

In 2012, Blomqvist effectively retired as a footballer by focusing on his civilian career. He did this by initiating studies in commerce.

== International career ==
Blomqvist was part of the bronze medal-winning Sweden national team at the 1994 FIFA World Cup. He gained his first international cap against Colombia in 1994. His only World Cup match in the starting eleven came against Cameroon, although he also replaced Henrik Larsson in the second half of a draw against eventual champions Brazil. Each member of the squad was awarded a Svenska Dagbladet Gold Medal in recognition of their third place in the tournament. Blomqvist was also considered for the 2002 FIFA World Cup squad. In total, Blomqvist has made 30 appearances for his country, without scoring.

== Personal life ==
Blomqvist was born and raised in Tavelsjö, in the Umeå Municipality of Sweden. He currently resides in Sweden, although he has also purchased property in Croatia.

After officially retiring in 2005, Blomqvist became a pundit for Swedish television station TV4. He was the victim of an assault during a visit to his hometown Umeå in September 2006, when he was struck twice across the face. His attacker was prosecuted for the incident.

Blomqvist and his ex-wife Pauline have a son born in 2012. They had divorced in 2016 but remain friends and share custody of their son.

== Career statistics ==
=== Club ===
Appearances and goals by club, season and competition
Club	Season	League			National cup		League cup		Europe		Other (Note: Includes other competitive competitions, including the FA Community Shield, UEFA Super Cup, Intercontinental Cup, FIFA Club World Cup)		Total	
Club	Season	Division	Apps	Goals	Apps	Goals	Apps	Goals	Apps	Goals	Apps	Goals	Apps	Goals
Umeå	1992	Division 2 Norra Norrland/Höstettan Norra	27	6			–		–		–		27	6
Umeå	1993	Division 1 Norra	11	2			–		–		–		11	2
Umeå	Total		38	8			–		–		–		38	8
IFK Göteborg	1993	Allsvenskan	6	1	0	0	–		0	0	–		6	1
IFK Göteborg	1994	Allsvenskan	24	8	1	0	–		9	3	–		34	11
IFK Göteborg	1995	Allsvenskan	18	3	3	1	–		2	1	–		23	5
IFK Göteborg	1996	Allsvenskan	25	6	5	0	–		7	2	–		37	8
IFK Göteborg	Total		73	18	9	1	–		18	6	–		100	24
AC Milan	1996–97	Serie A	19	1	0	0	–		–		–		19	1
AC Milan	1997–98	Serie A	1	0	1	0	–		–		–		2	0
AC Milan	Total		20	1	1	0	–		–		–		21	1
Parma	1997–98	Serie A	28	1	3	0	–		–		–		31	1
Manchester United	1998–99	Premier League	25	1	5	0	1	0	7	0	–		38	1
Manchester United	1999–2000	Premier League	0	0	0	0	0	0	0	0	–		0	0
Manchester United	2000–01	Premier League	0	0	0	0	0	0	0	0	–		0	0
Manchester United	Total		25	1	5	0	1	0	7	0	–		38	1
Everton	2001–02	Premier League	15	1	3	0	0	0	0	0	0	0	18	1
Charlton Athletic	2002–03	Premier League	3	0	1	0	0	0	0	0	0	0	4	0
Djurgården	2003	Allsvenskan	9	1	0	0	–		1	0	–		10	1
Djurgården	2004	Allsvenskan	0	0	0	0	–		0	0	–		0	0
Djurgården	2005	Allsvenskan	0	0	0	0	–		0	0	–		0	0
Djurgården	Total		9	1	0	0	–		1	0	0	0	10	1
Enköping	2008	Superettan	10	1			–		–		–		10	1
Hammarby	2010	Superettan	6	0	1	0	–		–		–		7	0
Career total			227	32	23	1	1	0	26	6	0	0	257	39

=== International ===
Appearances and goals by national team and year
National team	Year	Apps	Goals
Sweden	1994	12	0
Sweden	1995	2	0
Sweden	1996	4	0
Sweden	1997	6	0
Sweden	1998	3	0
Sweden	1999	2	0
Sweden	2000	0	0
Sweden	2001	0	0
Sweden	2002	1	0
Total		30	0

== Honours ==
Umeå

- Division 2 Norra Norrland: 1992

IFK Göteborg

- Allsvenskan: 1993, 1994, 1995, 1996

Manchester United

- Premier League: 1998–99
- FA Cup: 1998–99
- UEFA Champions League: 1998–99

Djurgården

- Allsvenskan: 2003

Sweden

- FIFA World Cup third place: 1994

Individual

- Årets komet: 1994
- Swedish Goal of the Year: 1995
- Folkets lirare: 1996
- Swedish Midfielder of the Year: 1996
