= Peter Eriksson (footballer) =

Swedish footballer

Personal information
- Date of birth: 18 May 1969 (age 57)
- Place of birth: Sweden
- Position: Midfielder

Senior career*
Years	Team	Apps	(Gls)
1988–1998	IFK Göteborg	169	(28)
1998–2002	BK Häcken	60	(13)
1999	→ Dalian Wanda (loan)	30	(5)
2002–2003	IFK Göteborg	10	(1)
2003	BK Forward	3	(0)

International career^{‡}
1992	Sweden	1	(0)
- * Club domestic league appearances and goals as of 26 October 2017 (UTC) ‡ National team caps and goals as of 26 October (UTC)

Peter Eriksson (born 18 May 1969) is a Swedish retired footballer. During his club career, Eriksson played for IFK Göteborg, BK Häcken, Dalian Wanda and BK Forward. He made one appearance for the Sweden national team.

== Honours ==
Allsvenskan: 1990, 1991, 1993, 1994, 1995, 1996

Svenska Cupen: 1992-93

Individual

- Årets Ärkeängel: 1993
