= Andreas Andersson (footballer, born 1974) =

Swedish footballer

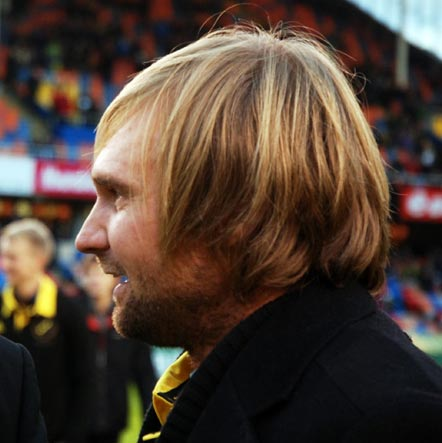
- Andreas Andersson in November 2012

Personal information
- Full name: Andreas Claes Andersson
- Date of birth: 10 April 1974 (age 52)
- Place of birth: Nacka, Sweden
- Height: 1.86 m (6 ft 1 in)
- Position: Forward

Youth career
- 1979–1993: Hova IF

Senior career*
Years	Team	Apps	(Gls)
1994	Tidaholms GOIF	9	(6)
1994–1995	Degerfors IF	40	(16)
1996–1997	IFK Göteborg	39	(32)
1997–1998	A.C. Milan	13	(1)
1998–1999	Newcastle United	27	(4)
1999–2005	AIK	82	(25)
Total		210	(84)

International career^{‡}
1991	Sweden U17	2	(0)
1995–1996	Sweden U21	3	(3)
1995–1996	Sweden B	2	(0)
1996–2003	Sweden	43	(8)
- * Club domestic league appearances and goals as of 16:00, 30 November 2006 ‡ National team caps and goals as of 16:00, 30 November 2006

Andreas Claes Andersson (Swedish pronunciation: [anˈdreː.as ˈanː.dɛʂˌsɔn]; born 10 April 1974) is a Swedish former professional footballer who played as a striker. He was the Allsvenskan top scorer with IFK Göteborg when they won the 1996 Allsvenskan, and went on to represent Milan, Newcastle United, and AIK before retiring in 2005. A full international between 1996 and 2003, he scored 8 goals in 43 caps for the Sweden national team, and represented his country at the 2002 FIFA World Cup.

== Club career ==
=== Early career ===
Andersson was signed by the Division 2 club Tidaholms G&IF before the 1994 season from the Division 5 club Hova IF. He scored 6 goals in 9 games for Tidaholm before being signed by the Allsvenskan outfit Degerfors IF during the same year. He spent a season and a half at Degerfors, scoring 16 Allsvenskan goals in 40 games.

=== IFK Göteborg ===
Prior to the 1996 Allsvenskan season, Andersson signed for the reigning Allsvenskan champions IFK Göteborg. During his first season with Göteborg, Andersson finished as the Allsvenskan top scorer with 19 goals as IFK Göteborg won the league. In the 1996–97 UEFA Champions League, Andersson scored against A.C. Milan in a 2–4 group stage loss at San Siro. During the 1997 season, Andersson scored 13 goals in 13 games during the first half of the season, before leaving the club in the summer.

=== Milan ===
Andersson was signed by Milan ahead of the 1997–98 Serie A season. He scored his only Serie A goal for Milan in a 1–0 win against Empoli F.C. on 5 October 1997.

=== Newcastle United ===
Andersson signed for Newcastle United in the English Premier League in January 1998 but missed several months with glandular fever then struggled to regain form. He played in the 1998 FA Cup Final, which Newcastle lost to Arsenal.

=== AIK and retirement ===
Andersson returned to Sweden in the summer of 1999, as AIK's most expensive signing ever ahead of their 1999–2000 UEFA Champions League campaign. He scored two goals against Arsenal during that Champions League season in a 2–3 group stage loss at Råsunda Stadium in Solna, Sweden. Injury problems caused him to retire on 1 August 2005, with Andersson looking to remain in football as a coach.

== International career ==
Andersson made his full international debut for the Sweden national team on 25 February 1996 in a friendly game against Australia in Brisbane, in which he scored two goals. He scored his first competitive international goal in a 2–1 win against England in a UEFA Euro 2000 qualifying match, which ultimately helped Sweden qualify for UEFA Euro 2000. However, an injury to his cruciate ligament caused him to miss the tournament.

On 5 September 2001, Andersson scored the decisive goal away against Turkey in a 2–1 victory, which meant that Sweden qualified for the 2002 FIFA World Cup the following summer. Andersson was used as a substitute in the tournament and nearly scored against Argentina, but his shot hit the cross bar. He played in all four games as Sweden was eliminated by Senegal in the second round.

His last ever international appearance came in a UEFA Euro 2004 qualifying game against San Marino on 7 June 2003, before another knee injury ruled Andersson out of playing for Sweden at Euro 2004 and ultimately ended his international career.

In total Andersson won 43 caps for Sweden, scoring 8 goals.

== Career statistics ==
=== Club ===
Appearances and goals by club, season and competition
Club	Season	Division	League		Domestic Cup		League Cup		Europe		Total	
Club	Season	Division	Apps	Goals	Apps	Goals	Apps	Goals	Apps	Goals	Apps	Goals
Tidaholms G&IF	1994	Division 2 Västra Götaland	9	6			—		—		9	6
Degerfors IF	1994	Allsvenskan	14	3			—		—		14	3
Degerfors IF	1995	Allsvenskan	26	13			—		—		26	13
Degerfors IF	Total		40	16			—		—		40	16
IFK Göteborg	1996	Allsvenskan	26	19	5	3	—		6	1	37	23
IFK Göteborg	1997	Allsvenskan	13	13	1	0	—		2	0	16	13
IFK Göteborg	Total		39	32	6	3	—		8	1	53	36
Milan	1997–98	Serie A	13	1	5	0	—		—		18	1
Newcastle United	1997–98	Premier League	12	2	3	0	—		—		15	2
Newcastle United	1998–99	Premier League	15	2	0	0	0	0	1	0	16	2
Newcastle United	Total		27	4	3	0	0	0	1	0	31	4
AIK	1999	Allsvenskan	8	2	—		—		6	2	14	4
AIK	2000	Allsvenskan	4	0	—		—		—		4	0
AIK	2001	Allsvenskan	26	9	3	0	—		4	0	33	9
AIK	2002	Allsvenskan	25	8	4	1	—		2	1	31	10
AIK	2003	Allsvenskan	13	4	—		—		—		13	4
AIK	2004	Allsvenskan	0	0	—		—		—		0	0
AIK	2005	Superettan	6	2	—		—		—		6	2
AIK	Total		82	25	7	1	—		12	3	101	29
Career total			210	84	21	4	0	0	21	4	252	92

=== International ===
Appearances and goals by national team and year
National team	Year	Apps	Goals
Sweden	1996	5	2
Sweden	1997	12	2
Sweden	1998	5	1
Sweden	1999	2	0
Sweden	2000	4	0
Sweden	2001	2	2
Sweden	2002	9	1
Sweden	2003	4	0
Total		43	8

Scores and results list Sweden's goal tally first, score column indicates score after each Andersson goal.

List of international goals scored by Andreas Andersson
No.	Date	Venue	Opponent	Score	Result	Competition
1	25 February 1996	Suncorp Stadium, Brisbane, Australia	Australia	1–0	2–0	Friendly
2	25 February 1996	Suncorp Stadium, Brisbane, Australia	Australia	2–0	2–0	Friendly
3	9 February 1997	National Stadium, Bangkok, Thailand	Romania	1–0	2–0	1997 King's Cup
4	12 March 1997	Ramat Gan Stadium, Ramat Gan, Israel	Israel	1–0	1–0	Friendly
5	5 September 1998	Råsunda Stadium, Solna, Sweden	England	1–1	2–1	UEFA Euro 2000 qualifying
6	15 August 2001	Råsunda Stadium, Solna, Sweden	South Africa	3–0	3–0	Friendly
7	5 September 2001	Ali Sami Yen Stadium, Istanbul, Turkey	Turkey	2–1	2–1	2002 FIFA World Cup qualifying
8	17 May 2002	Råsunda Stadium, Solna, Sweden	Paraguay	1–2	1–2	Friendly

== Honours ==
IFK Göteborg

- Allsvenskan: 1996

Newcastle United

- FA Cup runner-up: 1997–98

AIK

- Superettan: 2005

Sweden

- King's Cup: 1997

Individual

- Allsvenskan top scorer: 1996
- Stor Grabb: 1997
