= 1998 Allsvenskan =

74th season of Allsvenskan

Allsvenskan
- Season: 1998
- Champions: AIK
- Relegated: BK Häcken; Östers IF
- Champions League: AIK
- UEFA Cup: Helsingborgs IF
- Top goalscorer: Arild Stavrum, Helsingborgs IF (18)
- Average attendance: 5,647

Allsvenskan 1998, part of the 1998 Swedish football season, was the 74th Allsvenskan season played. AIK won the league ahead of runners-up Helsingborgs IF, while BK Häcken and Östers IF were relegated. AIK won the title despite having the fewest goals (25) scored in the league.

Of the 315 players who participated, fewer than half (147) were full-time professional footballers. Many were students, while just over a quarter (81) had full-time jobs outside football, although this proportion had substantially reduced from previous Allsvenskan seasons.

== League table ==
Pos	Team	Pld	W	D	L	GF	GA	GD	Pts	Qualification or relegation
1	AIK (C)	26	11	13	2	25	15	+10	46	Qualification to Champions League second qualifying round
2	Helsingborgs IF	26	12	8	6	43	28	+15	44	Qualification to UEFA Cup qualifying round
3	Hammarby IF	26	11	9	6	39	34	+5	42	Qualification to Intertoto Cup second round
4	Halmstads BK	26	12	5	9	42	40	+2	41	Qualification to Intertoto Cup first round
5	Västra Frölunda	26	10	8	8	29	31	−2	38	
6	Örebro SK	26	10	6	10	35	38	−3	36	
7	IFK Norrköping	26	9	8	9	43	35	+8	35	
8	IFK Göteborg	26	9	8	9	27	29	−2	35	Qualification to UEFA Cup qualifying round (Note: IFK Göteborg qualified for the UEFA Cup as Svenska Cupen runners-up 1998–99.)
9	Malmö FF	26	9	6	11	35	30	+5	33	
10	IF Elfsborg	26	8	9	9	36	33	+3	33	
11	Trelleborgs FF (O)	26	8	8	10	31	35	−4	32	Qualification to Relegation play-offs
12	Örgryte IS (O)	26	7	7	12	35	36	−1	28	Qualification to Relegation play-offs
13	BK Häcken (R)	26	7	6	13	27	46	−19	27	Relegation to Division 1
14	Östers IF (R)	26	5	7	14	26	43	−17	22	Relegation to Division 1

Rules for classification: 1) points; 2) goal difference; 3) number of goals scored.
(C) Champions; (O) Play-off winners; (R) Relegated

== Relegation play-offs ==
November 12, 1998

Landskrona BoIS	2–3	Trelleborgs FF

?, Landskrona
November 15, 1998

Trelleborgs FF	4–1	Landskrona BoIS

?, Trelleborg

November 12, 1998

Umeå FC	2–3	Örgryte IS

?, Umeå
November 15, 1998

Örgryte IS	3–0	Umeå FC

?, Gothenburg

== Results ==
Home \ Away	AIK	BKH	HBK	HAIF	HEIF	IFE	IFKG	IFKN	MFF	TFF	VF	ÖSK	ÖIS	ÖIF
AIK		2–1	1–0	0–1	1–1	1–1	1–0	1–1	1–0	1–1	0–0	2–0	1–0	1–1
BK Häcken	1–1		3–2	4–3	2–1	0–2	1–1	0–1	2–1	0–5	0–1	2–4	0–2	0–1
Halmstads BK	1–1	0–1		1–3	1–0	0–3	1–1	3–1	2–1	3–0	1–0	2–0	2–1	1–2
Hammarby IF	0–2	3–3	1–1		3–3	1–0	1–1	3–2	1–3	1–0	0–1	3–1	1–0	0–1
Helsingborgs IF	0–1	0–0	1–0	2–2		2–0	0–1	1–1	1–2	3–0	6–2	0–0	2–1	3–1
IF Elfsborg	1–1	2–0	3–4	0–1	0–1		1–0	1–1	2–1	1–1	0–2	0–1	2–2	2–1
IFK Göteborg	0–1	1–1	1–2	2–2	0–1	1–0		0–0	1–0	1–0	1–2	2–0	2–5	1–1
IFK Norrköping	2–0	5–1	4–6	1–2	3–4	1–1	0–1		2–1	3–0	1–3	4–0	1–1	1–0
Malmö FF	0–0	4–0	5–0	2–2	1–1	0–4	3–1	1–0		0–1	0–0	1–3	3–1	2–0
Trelleborgs FF	0–0	0–1	1–3	1–1	4–2	2–2	0–2	0–0	0–0		3–0	1–0	2–1	2–0
Västra Frölunda	1–1	1–1	0–1	2–1	0–0	1–1	0–3	3–2	1–3	3–1		1–1	1–0	3–0
Örebro SK	1–1	1–0	3–2	0–1	1–3	4–2	4–0	1–3	0–0	4–2	1–1		1–1	2–1
Örgryte IS	0–1	2–1	2–2	0–1	0–2	2–2	1–2	1–1	2–0	1–2	2–0	2–0		4–4
Östers IF	1–2	0–2	1–1	1–1	1–3	2–3	1–1	0–2	2–1	2–2	1–0	1–2	0–1	

Legend: Blue = home team win; Yellow = draw; Red = away team win.

== Season statistics ==
=== Top scorers ===
Rank	Player	Club	Goals
1	(Norway) Arild Stavrum	Helsingborgs IF	18
2	(Sweden) Hans Berggren	Hammarby IF	13
3	(Sweden) Christer Mattiasson	IF Elfsborg	12
4	(Sweden) Mats Lilienberg	Halmstads BK	11
5	(Sweden) Dan Sahlin	Örebro SK	10
5	(Sweden) Dejan Pavlovic	Malmö FF	10
5	(Sweden) Henrik Bertilsson	Örgryte IS	10
8	(Sweden) Tomas Rosenkvist	Västra Frölunda	8
8	(Sweden) Andreas Hermansson	IFK Göteborg	8
8	(Sweden) Andreas Ottosson	Östers IF	8
8	(Sweden) Patrik Andersson	Hammarby IF	8

== Attendances ==
#	Club	Average attendance	Highest attendance
1	AIK	11,112	31,893
2	Hammarby IF	10,967	33,094
3	Helsingborgs IF	9,067	12,914
4	Malmö FF	7,014	16,328
5	IFK Göteborg	6,414	12,213
6	IF Elfsborg	5,917	10,255
7	Örebro SK	5,721	9,103
8	Halmstads BK	5,038	8,441
9	IFK Norrköping	4,869	13,311
10	Östers IF	3,008	4,367
11	Trelleborgs FF	2,969	5,410
12	BK Häcken	2,537	9,115
13	Västra Frölunda IF	2,268	4,589
14	Örgryte IS	2,159	6,679
