= Mikael Björqvist =

Swedish footballer

Personal information
- Date of birth: 28 August 1972 (age 54)
- Place of birth: Sweden
- Height: 1.95 m (6 ft 5 in)
- Position: Defender

Senior career*
Years	Team	Apps	(Gls)
1998–2000	Västra Frölunda	72	(7)
2001–2003	Örgryte IS	18	(1)
Total		90	(8)
- * Club domestic league appearances and goals

Mikael Björqvist (born 28 August 1972) is a Swedish former professional footballer who played as a defender for Västra Frölunda and Örgryte IS in the Allsvenskan. (Note: Mikael Björqvist at WorldFootball.net)
