= 1999 Allsvenskan =

75th season of Allsvenskan

Allsvenskan
- Season: 1999
- Champions: Helsingborgs IF
- Relegated: Kalmar FF (after play-offs); Malmö FF; Djurgårdens IF
- Champions League: Helsingborgs IF
- UEFA Cup: AIK; Halmstads BK; Örgryte IS; IFK Norrköping
- Top goalscorer: Marcus Allbäck, Örgryte IS (15)
- Average attendance: 7,217

Allsvenskan 1999, part of the 1999 Swedish football season, was the 75th Allsvenskan season played. Helsingborgs IF won the league ahead of runners-up AIK, while Kalmar FF, Malmö FF and Djurgårdens IF were relegated.

== Summary ==
- On 30 October 1999, in the final round, Helsingborgs IF won the Swedish Championship by defeating IFK Göteborg, 1–0, in an away game following a goal by Arild Stavrum.

== League table ==
Pos	Team	Pld	W	D	L	GF	GA	GD	Pts	Qualification or relegation
1	Helsingborgs IF (C)	26	17	3	6	44	24	+20	54	Qualification to Champions League second qualifying round
2	AIK	26	16	5	5	42	14	+28	53	Qualification to UEFA Cup qualifying round
3	Halmstads BK	26	14	6	6	43	22	+21	48	Qualification to UEFA Cup qualifying round
4	Örgryte IS	26	11	10	5	41	23	+18	43	Qualification to UEFA Cup qualifying round
5	IFK Norrköping	26	11	6	9	41	36	+5	39	Qualification to UEFA Cup qualifying round
6	IFK Göteborg	26	11	5	10	27	33	−6	38	
7	Västra Frölunda	26	9	7	10	30	33	−3	34	Qualification to Intertoto Cup first round
8	Trelleborgs FF	26	9	6	11	39	47	−8	33	
9	IF Elfsborg	26	9	5	12	41	48	−7	32	
10	Hammarby IF	26	8	5	13	32	42	−10	29	
11	Kalmar FF (R)	26	8	4	14	27	41	−14	28	Qualification to Relegation play-offs
12	Örebro SK (O)	26	8	3	15	24	36	−12	27	Qualification to Relegation play-offs
13	Malmö FF (R)	26	7	4	15	30	48	−18	25	Relegation to Superettan
14	Djurgårdens IF (R)	26	5	9	12	27	41	−14	24	Relegation to Superettan

Rules for classification: 1) points; 2) goal difference; 3) number of goals scored.
(C) Champions; (O) Play-off winners; (R) Relegated

== Relegation play-offs ==
November 3, 1999

Assyriska Föreningen	1–1	Örebro SK

Södertälje
November 6, 1999

Örebro SK	1–1 2–1 (aet)	Assyriska Föreningen

Örebro

November 3, 1999

GAIS	2–1	Kalmar FF

Gothenburg
November 6, 1999

Kalmar FF	1–1	GAIS

Kalmar

== Results ==
Home \ Away	AIK	DIF	HBK	HAIF	HEIF	IFE	IFKG	IFKN	KFF	MFF	TFF	VF	ÖSK	ÖIS
AIK		3–1	0–1	2–0	2–1	3–0	2–0	2–0	4–0	3–0	3–0	1–0	1–1	1–1
Djurgårdens IF	0–0		0–2	1–0	2–4	1–2	2–0	3–0	0–3	4–1	2–2	1–1	0–1	0–3
Halmstads BK	1–0	4–1		3–1	4–0	3–0	4–0	1–1	1–0	2–1	2–2	1–2	5–1	0–0
Hammarby IF	0–2	2–1	1–0		2–1	2–1	2–1	3–0	2–2	0–1	4–0	1–2	2–1	0–0
Helsingborgs IF	0–2	4–1	1–0	2–0		1–1	3–1	0–1	3–0	1–0	5–3	1–0	2–1	2–0
IF Elfsborg	2–2	2–1	1–4	3–0	1–1		0–1	2–1	3–0	5–2	1–2	2–3	3–1	1–2
IFK Göteborg	1–0	0–0	1–1	2–2	0–1	2–0		2–3	2–0	1–0	2–1	1–0	0–1	1–0
IFK Norrköping	0–1	1–1	4–0	3–2	1–0	1–1	3–0		4–2	5–1	2–5	2–1	1–0	0–2
Kalmar FF	1–3	0–0	2–0	4–1	0–2	0–1	0–1	1–1		1–0	3–2	3–1	2–0	2–2
Malmö FF	2–1	2–0	0–1	2–0	0–4	4–2	1–1	0–0	0–1		1–2	2–1	3–1	1–1
Trelleborgs FF	1–0	2–2	1–1	2–2	2–3	1–2	3–1	0–4	1–0	3–1		1–0	2–1	0–0
Västra Frölunda	0–1	1–1	0–0	1–1	0–0	4–4	1–2	1–1	2–0	2–1	2–1		2–0	2–1
Örebro SK	0–2	1–1	1–2	3–1	0–1	1–0	1–2	2–1	2–0	2–0	1–0	0–1		0–1
Örgryte IS	1–1	0–1	1–0	2–1	0–1	5–1	2–2	3–1	3–0	4–4	2–0	4–0	1–1	

Legend: Blue = home team win; Yellow = draw; Red = away team win.

== Season statistics ==
=== Top scorers ===
Rank	Player	Club	Goals
1	(Sweden) Marcus Allbäck	Örgryte IS	15
2	(Sweden) Henrik Bertilsson	Halmstads BK	13
3	(Sweden) Mats Lilienberg	Malmö FF	11
3	(Norway) Arild Stavrum	Helsingborgs IF	11
5	(Sweden) Christer Mattiasson	AIK	10
6	(Sweden) Jonas Wallerstedt	IFK Norrköping	9
6	(Sweden) Michael Hansson	Trelleborgs FF	9
8	(Sweden) Sharbel Tourma	Djurgårdens IF	8
8	(Sweden) Pär Ekström	Örebro SK	8
8	(Sweden) Magnus Powell	Helsingborgs IF	8
8	(Sweden) Gustaf Andersson	Västra Frölunda	8

== Attendances ==
#	Club	Average	Highest
1	AIK	13,549	28,054
2	Hammarby IF	11,917	31,412
3	Helsingborgs IF	10,583	14,139
4	Djurgårdens IF	9,173	23,066
5	IFK Göteborg	8,436	15,618
6	Malmö FF	6,979	18,083
7	Kalmar FF	6,367	9,797
8	Örebro SK	6,164	10,727
9	IF Elfsborg	6,140	12,222
10	IFK Norrköping	6,054	11,761
11	Halmstads BK	5,256	10,238
12	Örgryte IS	5,031	10,292
13	Trelleborgs FF	3,100	7,592
14	Västra Frölunda IF	2,296	3,710
