= Mats Lilienberg =

Swedish footballer

Personal information
- Full name: Mats Christer Lilienberg
- Date of birth: 22 December 1969 (age 56)
- Place of birth: Vollsjö, Sweden
- Height: 1.83 m (6 ft 0 in)
- Position: Striker

Senior career*
Years	Team	Apps	(Gls)
1989	Vollsjö IF		
1989–1990	Sjöbo IF	16	(13)
1990–1993	Trelleborgs FF	94	(42)
1993–1994	1860 Munich	19	(4)
1995–1996	IFK Göteborg	30	(5)
1996–1998	Halmstads BK	51	(25)
1999–2002	Malmö FF	79	(21)
2002–2004	Trelleborgs FF	56	(24)
2005–2011	Höörs IS		

International career
1991–1992	Sweden U21	3	(0)
1993–1998	Sweden	5	(1)
- * Club domestic league appearances and goals

Mats Christer Lilienberg (born 22 December 1969) is a Swedish former professional footballer who played as a striker. He won three Allsvenskan titles and was the Allsvenskan top scorer twice during a professional career that spanned between 1990 and 2004. A full international between 1993 and 1998, he won five caps for the Sweden national team and scored one goal.

== Club career ==
Lilienberg represented Trelleborgs FF, 1860 Munich, IFK Göteborg, Halmstads BK, Malmö FF, and Höörs IS during his career. He won three Allsvenskan titles (in 1995, 1996, and 1997) and was the joint Allsvenskan top scorer in 1993 and 1997 with 18 and 14 goals respectively. While at Malmö FF, he played at forward alongside a young Zlatan Ibrahimovic.

== International career ==
After having represented the Sweden U21 team a total of three times, Lilienberg made his full international debut for Sweden on 10 November 1993 in a 1994 FIFA World Cup qualifier against Austria when he replaced Henrik Larsson in the 72nd minute of a 1–1 draw. He scored his first and only international goal for Sweden in a friendly 3–1 win against the United States on 20 February 1994. He won his fifth and final cap on 29 January 1998 in a friendly 0–0 draw with Jamaica.

== Career statistics ==
=== International ===
Appearances and goals by national team and year
National team	Year	Apps	Goals
Sweden	1993	1	0
Sweden	1994	2	1
Sweden	1995	0	0
Sweden	1996	0	0
Sweden	1997	0	0
Sweden	1998	2	0
Total		5	1

Scores and results list Sweden's goal tally first.

#	Date	Venue	Opponent	Score	Result	Competition
1.	20 February 1994	Joe Robbie Stadium, Miami, Florida, United States	United States	3–1	3–1	Joe Robbie Cup

== Honours ==
IFK Göteborg

- Allsvenskan: 1995, 1996

Halmstads BK

- Allsvenskan: 1997

Individual

- Allsvenskan top scorer: 1993 (shared with Henrik Bertilsson), 1997 (shared with Christer Mattiasson and Dan Sahlin)
