= Tomas Rosenkvist =

Swedish footballer (born 1975)

Personal information
- Date of birth: 23 June 1975 (age 51)
- Height: 1.73 m (5 ft 8 in)
- Position: Midfielder

Youth career
- Västra Frölunda IF

Senior career*
Years	Team	Apps	(Gls)
1993–1999	Västra Frölunda IF		
2000–2004	IFK Göteborg	93	(22)
2005–2006	GAIS		

International career
1992	Sweden U19	4	(2)
1994–1998	Sweden U21	2	(0)
- * Club domestic league appearances and goals

Tomas Rosenkvist (born 23 June 1975) is a Swedish former football midfielder.

== Honours ==
Individual

- Årets Ärkeängel: 2002
