= Henrik Bertilsson =

Swedish footballer

Personal information
- Full name: Claes Henrik Bertilsson
- Date of birth: 16 October 1969 (age 57)
- Place of birth: Sweden
- Height: 1.90 m (6 ft 3 in)
- Position: Forward

Senior career*
Years	Team	Apps	(Gls)
1987–1992	Falkenberg		
1992–1994	Halmstad		
1994–1995	Martigues		
1995–1999	Örgryte		
1999–2002	Halmstad		
2002–2003	Falkenberg		

International career
1993	Sweden	1	(0)
- * Club domestic league appearances and goals

Claes Henrik Bertilsson (born 16 October 1969) is a Swedish former professional footballer who played as a forward. Bertilsson played for Falkenberg, Halmstad, Martigues and Örgryte. He also appeared once for the Sweden national team in 1993.

He finished his career in October 2002 with Falkenbergs FF, when the team was promoted to Superettan.

== Honours ==
Halmstad

- Allsvenskan: 2000

Individual

- Allsvenskan top scorer: 1993 (shared with Mats Lilienberg)
