= Gustaf Andersson (footballer, born 1974) =

Swedish footballer

Personal information
- Full name: Jan Gustaf Andersson
- Date of birth: 6 December 1974 (age 51)
- Place of birth: Trollhättan, Sweden
- Height: 1.88 m (6 ft 2 in)
- Position: Forward

Youth career
- 1980–1990: Trollhättans BoIS
- 1991: Trollhättans FK

Senior career*
Years	Team	Apps	(Gls)
1992–1996	Trollhättans FK	52	(28)
1997–1999	Västra Frölunda IF	70	(19)
2000–2002	IFK Göteborg	65	(24)
2002–2007	Helsingborgs IF	70	(19)
Total		257	(90)

International career
2001	Sweden	1	(0)
- * Club domestic league appearances and goals

Jan Gustaf Andersson (born 6 December 1974) is a Swedish former football striker, ended his career in 2007 after not getting a new contract with Allsvenskan side Helsingborgs IF. He signed for the club in 2002, leaving IFK Göteborg. He was known as a versatile player who ran a lot and whose headings were a fearful weapon for opponents. He has played for the Sweden men's national football team. In January 2008, it was officially announced that Andersson's contract with HIF would not be extended. Andersson decided to end his professional career and start a civilian one instead, working as a coordinator for the public high schools in Helsingborg.
