= Christer Mattiasson =

Swedish footballer and manager

Personal information
- Full name: Björn Ove Christer Mattiasson
- Date of birth: 29 July 1971 (age 55)
- Place of birth: Borås, Sweden
- Height: 1.75 m (5 ft 9 in)
- Position: Striker

Team information
- Current team: Djurgårdens IF (assistant manager)

Youth career
- 1978–1982: Mariedals IK
- 1983–1985: Norrby IF
- 1986–: Byttorps IF

Senior career*
Years	Team	Apps	(Gls)
1989–1991	Byttorps IF	63	(85)
1992–1998	IF Elfsborg	164	(88)
1999–2001	AIK	43	(16)
2001	Lillestrøm SK	7	(0)
2001–2003	Djurgårdens IF	29	(4)
2003–2005	IF Brommapojkarna	36	(8)
2006–2011	Vallentuna BK		
2012–2014	Valsta Syrianska IK	6	(1)

International career
1998	Sweden	2	(0)

Managerial career
- 2006: Vallentuna BK (assistant)
- 2007–2011: Vallentuna BK
- 2011: Valsta Syrianska IK (assistant)
- 2012–2014: Valsta Syrianska IK
- 2015–2020: Sollentuna FK
- 2021–2022: IF Brommapojkarna
- 2023–2024: IK Sirius
- 2025–: Djurgårdens IF (assistant)
- * Club domestic league appearances and goals

Björn Ove Christer Mattiasson (born 29 July 1971) is a Swedish football manager and former player. He most notably played for IF Elfsborg, AIK, and Djurgårdens IF and made two appearances for the Sweden national team. He was the Allsvenskan top scorer of 1997.

== Club career ==
Starting off his career with Byttorps IF, Mattiasson made his Allsvenskan debut with IF Elfsborg and was the 1997 Allsvenskan top scorer with the team. He later signed with AIK ahead of the 1999 Allsvenskan season where he helped AIK win the 1998–99 Svenska Cupen and played in the 1999–2000 UEFA Champions League. He helped Djurgårdens IF win the 2002 Allsvenskan after a short stint with Lilleström in Norway and finished up his career with IF Brommapojkarna, Vallentuna BK, and Valsta Syrianska IK.

== International career ==
Mattiasson made his full international debut for the Sweden national team on 24 January 1998 in a 1–0 friendly loss to the United States when he replaced Mattias Jonson in the 86th minute. He made his second and last international appearance on 29 January 1998 in a friendly 0–0 draw with Jamaica, starting as a forward alongside Mats Lilienberg.

== Managerial career ==
Mattiasson, having coached Brommapojkarna and Sirius, returned to his former club Djurgården as an assistant coach to Jani Honkavaara in January 2025.

== Career statistics ==
=== International ===
Appearances and goals by national team and year
National team	Year	Apps	Goals
Sweden	1998	2	0
Total		2	0

== Honours ==
AIK

- Svenska Cupen: 1998–99

Djurgårdens IF

- Allsvenskan: 2002, 2003

Individual

- Allsvenskan top scorer: 1997 (shared with Mats Lilienberg and Dan Sahlin)
