= Jan Mattsson =

Swedish footballer

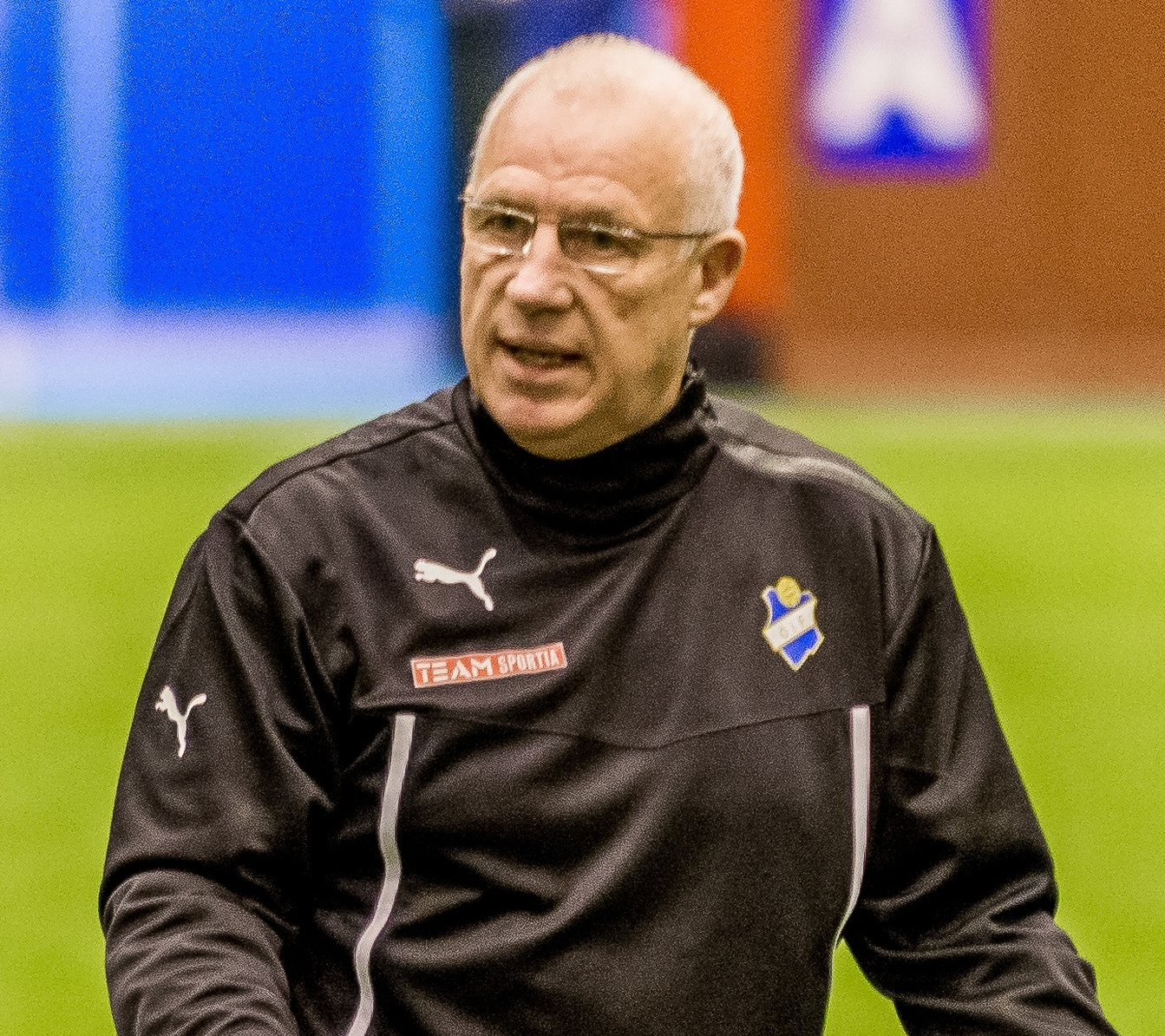
- Jan Mattsson in January 2013

Personal information
- Date of birth: 17 April 1951 (age 75)
- Place of birth: Sweden
- Position: Striker

Youth career
- Kallinge SK
- Saxemara IF

Senior career*
Years	Team	Apps	(Gls)
1969–1975	Öster		
1975–1976	Fortuna Düsseldorf	23	(10)
1976–1981	Bayer Uerdingen	117	(64)
1981–1984	Öster		

International career
1973–1976	Sweden	13	(0)

Managerial career
- 1990–1992: GIF Sundsvall
- 1993: Mjällby AIF
- 1998–2001: Öster
- * Club domestic league appearances and goals

Jan "Lill-Damma" Mattsson (born 17 April 1951) is a Swedish former professional football player.

He was capped 13 times for Sweden.
