= 1993 in Swedish football =

The 1993 season in Swedish football, starting January 1993 and ending December 1993:

== Honours ==
=== Official titles ===
Title	Team	Reason
Swedish Champions 1993	IFK Göteborg	Winners of Allsvenskan
Swedish Cup Champions 1992–93	Degerfors IF	Winners of Svenska Cupen

=== Competitions ===
Level	Competition	Team
1st level	Allsvenskan 1993	IFK Göteborg
2nd level	Division 1 Norra 1993	Hammarby IF
2nd level	Division 1 Södra 1993	Landskrona BoIS
Cup	Svenska Cupen 1992–93	Degerfors IF

== Promotions, relegations and qualifications ==
=== Promotions ===
Promoted from	Promoted to	Team	Reason
Division 1 Norra 1993	Allsvenskan 1994	Hammarby IF	Winners
Division 1 Södra 1993	Allsvenskan 1994	Landskrona BoIS	Winners
Division 2 1993	Division 1 Norra 1994	Kiruna FF	Winners of Norrland
Division 2 1993	Division 1 Norra 1994	Visby IF Gute	Winners of Östra Svealand
Division 2 1993	Division 1 Norra 1994	Västerås SK	Winners of Västra Svealand
Division 2 1993	Division 1 Södra 1994	Karlskrona AIF	Winners of Södra Götaland
Division 2 1993	Division 1 Södra 1994	Ljungskile SK	Winners of Västra Götaland
Division 2 1993	Division 1 Södra 1994	IK Sleipner	Winners of Östra Götaland
Division 2 1993	Division 1 Södra 1994	Stenungsunds IF	Winners of qualification play-off

=== Relegations ===
Relegated from	Relegated to	Team	Reason
Allsvenskan 1993	Division 1 Södra 1994	Örgryte IS	13th team
Allsvenskan 1993	Division 1 Norra 1994	IK Brage	14th team
Division 1 Norra 1993	Division 2 1994	Ope IF	12th team
Division 1 Norra 1993	Division 2 1994	IFK Sundsvall	13th team
Division 1 Norra 1993	Division 2 1994	Assyriska Föreningen	14th team
Division 1 Södra 1993	Division 2 1994	Myresjö IF	Losers of qualification play-off
Division 1 Södra 1993	Division 2 1994	IFK Uddevalla	12th team
Division 1 Södra 1993	Division 2 1994	Skövde AIK	13th team
Division 1 Södra 1993	Division 2 1994	Mjällby AIF	14th team

=== International qualifications ===
Qualified for	Enters	Team	Reason
UEFA Champions League 1994–95	Qualifying round	IFK Göteborg	Winners of Allsvenskan
UEFA Cup 1994–95	Preliminary round	AIK	3rd team in Allsvenskan
UEFA Cup 1994–95	Preliminary round	Trelleborgs FF	4th team in Allsvenskan
UEFA Cup Winners' Cup 1993–94	1st round	Degerfors IF	Winners of Svenska Cupen
International Football Cup 1994	Group stage	AIK	Unknown
International Football Cup 1994	Group stage	Halmstads BK	Unknown
International Football Cup 1994	Group stage	BK Häcken	Unknown
International Football Cup 1994	Group stage	IFK Norrköping	Unknown
International Football Cup 1994	Group stage	Trelleborgs FF	Unknown

== Domestic results ==
=== Allsvenskan 1993 ===
	Team	Pld	W	D	L	GF		GA	GD	Pts
1	IFK Göteborg	26	18	5	3	48	–	17	+31	59
2	IFK Norrköping	26	17	3	6	56	–	23	+33	54
3	AIK	26	14	4	8	49	–	43	+6	46
4	Trelleborgs FF	26	12	6	8	46	–	39	+7	42
5	Halmstads BK	26	11	5	10	50	–	41	+9	38
6	BK Häcken	26	11	4	11	44	–	49	-5	37
7	Västra Frölunda IF	26	11	4	11	38	–	45	-7	37
8	Östers IF	26	10	6	10	43	–	34	+9	36
9	Helsingborgs IF	26	10	6	10	43	–	46	-3	36
10	Malmö FF	26	10	5	11	43	–	38	+5	35
11	Örebro SK	26	10	3	13	35	–	38	-3	33
12	Degerfors IF	26	6	5	15	32	–	54	-22	23
13	Örgryte IS	26	5	6	15	26	–	44	-18	21
14	IK Brage	26	4	4	18	26	–	68	-42	16

=== Allsvenskan qualification play-off 1993 ===
October 31, 1993

Vasalunds IF	2–2	Örebro SK

?, Solna
November 6, 1993

Örebro SK	(ag) 0–0	Vasalunds IF

?, Örebro

October 30, 1993

Degerfors IF	2–1	IFK Hässleholm

?, Degerfors
November 7, 1993

IFK Hässleholm	1–2	Degerfors IF

?, Hässleholm

=== Division 1 Norra 1993 ===
	Team	Pld	W	D	L	GF		GA	GD	Pts
1	Hammarby IF	26	19	2	5	66	–	25	+41	59
2	Vasalunds IF	26	17	2	7	65	–	35	+30	53
3	Djurgårdens IF	26	13	7	6	58	–	31	+27	46
4	Spårvägens FF	26	11	10	5	42	–	20	+22	43
5	IFK Luleå	26	11	8	7	50	–	33	+17	41
6	Gefle IF	26	12	5	9	37	–	31	+6	41
7	Umeå FC	26	11	6	9	46	–	39	+7	39
8	GIF Sundsvall	26	11	5	10	45	–	47	-2	38
9	IF Brommapojkarna	26	10	4	12	30	–	33	-3	34
10	Spånga IS	26	9	6	11	31	–	38	-7	33
11	IK Sirius	26	8	5	13	32	–	47	-15	29
12	Ope IF	26	4	7	15	25	–	52	-27	19
13	IFK Sundsvall	26	5	2	19	32	–	75	-43	17
14	Assyriska Föreningen	26	4	5	17	23	–	76	-53	17

=== Division 1 Södra 1993 ===
	Team	Pld	W	D	L	GF		GA	GD	Pts
1	Landskrona BoIS	26	19	4	3	71	–	22	+49	61
2	IFK Hässleholm	26	16	4	6	56	–	32	+24	52
3	Kalmar FF	26	13	6	7	44	–	30	+14	45
4	IF Elfsborg	26	13	2	11	61	–	51	+10	41
5	GAIS	26	12	4	10	36	–	35	+1	40
6	Jonsereds IF	26	11	3	12	56	–	66	-10	36
7	Gunnilse IS	26	10	4	12	38	–	50	-12	34
8	IK Oddevold	26	8	8	10	42	–	50	-8	32
9	BK Forward	26	9	4	13	40	–	46	-6	31
10	Lunds BK	26	7	9	10	34	–	36	-2	30
11	Myresjö IF	26	8	6	12	44	–	60	-16	30
12	IFK Uddevalla	26	7	7	12	44	–	50	-6	28
13	Skövde AIK	26	8	3	15	44	–	60	-16	27
14	Mjällby AIF	26	6	6	14	29	–	51	-22	24

=== Division 1 qualification play-off 1993 ===
1st round

October 23, 1993

Skellefteå AIK	1–2	Myresjö IF

?, ?
October 27, 1993

Myresjö IF	1–0	Skellefteå AIK

?, ?

October 24, 1993

IFK Västerås	2–0	Nybro IF

?, ?
October 27, 1993

Nybro IF	1–1	IFK Västerås

?, ?

October 24, 1993

Väsby IK	3–1	Stenungsunds IF

?, ?
October 27, 1993

Stenungsunds IF	4–0	Väsby IK

?, ?

October 24, 1993

Falkenbergs FF	1–2	IK Sirius

?, ?
October 27, 1993

IK Sirius	3–1	Falkenbergs FF

?, ?

2nd round

October 31, 1993

Myresjö IF	2–2	Stenungsunds IF

?, ?
November 6, 1993

Stenungsunds IF	1–0	Myresjö IF

?, ?

October 31, 1993

IFK Västerås	0–1	IK Sirius

?, ?
November 7, 1993

IK Sirius	1–1	IFK Västerås

?, ?

=== Svenska Cupen 1992–93 ===
Final

June 16, 1993

Degerfors IF	3–0	Landskrona BoIS

Gamla Ullevi, Gothenburg
