= Dan Sahlin =

Swedish former professional footballer (born 1967)

Personal information
- Date of birth: 18 April 1967 (age 59)
- Place of birth: Falun, Sweden
- Height: 5 ft 10 in (1.78 m)
- Position: Forward

Senior career*
Years	Team	Apps	(Gls)
–	Nynäshamns IF		
199?–1995	Västerhaninge IF		
1995–1996	Hammarby IF	24	(12)
1995	→ Birmingham City (loan)	1	(0)
1996–1998	Örebro SK	55	(35)
1998–2000	AaB	6	(2)

International career
1995–1997	Sweden B	3	(0)
1995–1997	Sweden	3	(0)
- * Club domestic league appearances and goals

Dan Sahlin (born 18 April 1967) is a Swedish former professional footballer who played as a forward. A late bloomer, Sahlin did not turn professional until the age of 28 when he signed for the Allsvenskan club Hammarby IF in 1995. While at Örebro SK, he became the 1997 Allsvenskan top scorer alongside Mats Lilienberg and Christer Mattiasson. He also briefly represented Birmingham City and AaB. He won three caps for the Sweden national team between 1995 and 1997.

== Club career ==
Sahlin was born in Falun. He began his football career with Nynäshamns IF, and later played for Division 3 club Västerhaninge IF while also playing bandy at elite level. Sahlin came late into top-class football: he was nearly 28 years of age when, after lengthy negotiations, he joined Allsvenskan club Hammarby IF in February 1995. His debut was eventful: after 11 minutes 3 seconds, he scored the first goal of the 1995 Allsvenskan season, and in the 44th minute he received his second yellow card. He finished the season with 12 league goals and another 3 in the Swedish Cup, but his club were relegated.

In November 1995, Sahlin made his international debut for Sweden, after which he went to England to join Division One (second-tier) club Birmingham City on loan. He made his debut in the Football League on 26 November 1995 in a 2–2 draw at home to Leicester City, coming on as a 74th-minute substitute for fellow debutant Danny Hill. This was the only first-team game that Sahlin played for Birmingham, and he returned to Sweden in December.

Sahlin returned to the Allsvenskan with Örebro SK. In 1997 his 14 goals earned him a share in the league top scorer's crown, together with Christer Mattiasson of Elfsborg and Mats Lilienberg of Halmstad, and the following season his 10 goals made him Örebro's leading scorer. In his last game for ÖSK, Sahlin scored in the 89th minute to confirm a 4–2 win and take his club second in the table. In his three seasons with the club he scored 40 goals from 64 appearances in all competitions.

Sahlin signed a three-year contract with Danish Superliga club AaB. In July 1998, he made his debut, opening the scoring in the 39th minute in a 4–0 defeat of AGF Aarhus. He picked up a few injuries, including a minor ankle injury which required surgery. While in hospital, Sahlin suffered a staphylococcal infection in the operated area, which despite lengthy recuperative treatment forced his retirement. He played only six games for AaB, and scored twice.

== International career ==
Sahlin played in three B-internationals for Sweden and three matches for the senior national team. On 15 November 1995, he made his senior international debut, as an 83rd-minute substitute to replace Jörgen Pettersson in a UEFA Euro 1996 qualifying match against Turkey which finished as a 2–2 draw. His first start for his country came on 22 February 1996, when he played the first half of the Carlsberg Cup final against Japan in Hong Kong. His third and last international appearance came in a friendly away against Lithuania in August 1997.

== Career statistics ==
=== International ===
Appearances and goals by national team and year
National team	Year	Apps	Goals
Sweden	1995	1	0
Sweden	1996	1	0
Sweden	1997	1	0
Total		3	0

== Honours ==
Individual

- Allsvenskan top scorer: 1997 (shared with Christer Mattiasson and Mats Lilienberg)
