= Patrik Andersson (footballer, born 1967) =

Swedish footballer

Personal information
- Date of birth: 30 November 1967 (age 58)
- Place of birth: Sweden
- Position: Forward

Senior career*
Years	Team	Apps	(Gls)
1985–1996	IFK Norrköping	173	(51)
1996–2000	Hammarby IF	98	(25)
2001	Enköpings SK	5	(1)
2001	Motala AIF	6	(1)

International career^{‡}
1990	Sweden	1	(0)
- * Club domestic league appearances and goals as of 26 October 2017 (UTC) ‡ National team caps and goals as of 26 October (UTC)

Patrik Andersson (born 30 November 1967) is a Swedish retired footballer. During his club career, Andersson played as a midfielder/forward primarily for IFK Norrköping with 173 matches and 51 goals, Hammarby IF, Enköpings SK and Motala AIF. With 5 seasons in Hammarby IF and a succession of these years, he is one of 6 profiles 1970–2008 in the book "Green and white cult players - six Bajenprofiler 1970–2008" (Bajen is a nickname for Hammarby IF). He made one appearance for the Sweden national team.

== Honours ==
Allsvenskan: 1989

Svenska Cupen: 1987-88, 1990-91, 1993-94
