= Milenko Vukčević =

Yugoslav footballer (born 1966)

Personal information
- Date of birth: 14 September 1966 (age 60)
- Place of birth: Tuzla, SFR Yugoslavia
- Height: 1.80 m (5 ft 11 in)
- Position: Midfielder

Senior career*
Years	Team	Apps	(Gls)
1983–1988	Šparta Beli Manastir		
1988–1991	Osijek	92	(15)
1991–1992	Brüttisellen		
1992–1993	Spartak Subotica	0	(0)
1993–1997	Degerfors IF	114	(29)
1997	Viborg FF	14	(1)
1998	Degerfors IF		
1998–1999	Waldhof Mannheim	24	(2)
2000	Motala AIF		
2006	Ljungskile SK	1	(0)
- * Club domestic league appearances and goals

Milenko Vukčević (born 14 September 1966) is a Yugoslav former professional footballer who played as a midfielder.

== Career ==
Born in Tuzla, SR Bosnia and Herzegovina, he played with NK Šparta Beli Manastir from 1983 to 1988. Then he played with Croatian side NK Osijek in the Yugoslav First League between 1988 and 1991. Then he played for Brüttisellen in Switzerland. After Brüttisellen, he moved to Serbia and played with FK Spartak Subotica in the 1992–93 First League of FR Yugoslavia.

In 1993, he moved to Sweden where he played with Degerfors IF in two spells, first between 1993 and 1996, and second in the season 1997–98. In between he played with Viborg FF in the 1996–97 Danish Superliga.

He then played in Germany with Waldhof Mannheim and back in Sweden with lower-league side Motala AIF. He also played one game with Ljungskile SK in the 2006 Superettan.
