= 1993 Allsvenskan =

69th season of Allsvenskan

Allsvenskan
- Season: 1993
- Champions: IFK Göteborg
- Relegated: Örgryte IS; IK Brage
- Champions League: IFK Göteborg
- UEFA Cup: AIK; Trelleborgs FF
- Top goalscorer: Henrik Bertilsson, Halmstads BK; Mats Lilienberg, Trelleborgs FF (18)
- Average attendance: 4,838

Allsvenskan 1993, part of the 1993 Swedish football season, was the 69th Allsvenskan season played. IFK Göteborg won the league ahead of runners-up IFK Norrköping, while Örgryte IS and IK Brage were relegated.

== League table ==
Pos	Team	Pld	W	D	L	GF	GA	GD	Pts	Qualification or relegation
1	IFK Göteborg (C)	26	18	5	3	48	17	+31	59	Qualification to Champions League qualifying round
2	IFK Norrköping	26	17	3	6	56	23	+33	54	Qualification to Cup Winners' Cup qualifying round (Note: IFK Norrköping qualified for the UEFA Cup Winners' Cup as Svenska Cupen champions 1993–94.)
3	AIK	26	14	4	8	49	43	+6	46	Qualification to UEFA Cup preliminary round
4	Trelleborgs FF	26	12	6	8	46	39	+7	42	Qualification to UEFA Cup preliminary round
5	Halmstads BK	26	11	5	10	50	41	+9	38	
6	BK Häcken	26	11	4	11	44	49	−5	37	
7	Västra Frölunda	26	11	4	11	38	45	−7	37	
8	Östers IF	26	10	6	10	43	34	+9	36	
9	Helsingborgs IF	26	10	6	10	43	46	−3	36	
10	Malmö FF	26	10	5	11	43	38	+5	35	
11	Örebro SK (O)	26	10	3	13	35	38	−3	33	Qualification to Relegation play-offs
12	Degerfors IF (O)	26	6	5	15	32	54	−22	23	Qualification to Relegation play-offs
13	Örgryte IS (R)	26	5	6	15	26	44	−18	21	Relegation to Division 1
14	IK Brage (R)	26	4	4	18	26	68	−42	16	Relegation to Division 1

Source: SFS-Bolletinen
Rules for classification: 1) points; 2) goal difference; 3) number of goals scored.
(C) Champions; (O) Play-off winners; (R) Relegated

== Relegation play-offs ==
October 31, 1993

Vasalunds IF	2–2	Örebro SK

?, Solna
November 6, 1993

Örebro SK	(ag) 0–0	Vasalunds IF

?, Örebro

October 30, 1993

Degerfors IF	2–1	IFK Hässleholm

?, Degerfors
November 7, 1993

IFK Hässleholm	1–2	Degerfors IF

?, Hässleholm

== Results ==
Home \ Away	AIK	BKH	DEG	HBK	HIF	IFKG	IFKN	IKB	MFF	TFF	VF	ÖSK	ÖIS	ÖIF
AIK		2–0	3–0	2–3	2–1	1–5	1–0	9–3	0–4	2–1	1–0	3–1	1–2	3–2
BK Häcken	5–2		3–0	2–1	2–2	0–2	3–2	3–0	4–2	3–3	2–1	1–3	0–0	1–1
Degerfors IF	1–2	1–2		1–1	4–2	2–4	1–0	2–4	1–0	4–0	3–0	1–1	2–3	2–5
Halmstads BK	3–3	4–2	6–1		3–0	2–1	1–3	3–2	0–1	2–0	2–3	3–1	4–2	1–2
Helsingborgs IF	2–3	3–2	2–1	2–2		1–2	0–2	4–1	0–2	0–0	1–1	2–1	3–0	2–0
IFK Göteborg	1–1	3–0	1–0	2–0	2–0		2–1	0–0	5–1	2–1	0–1	2–0	1–1	1–1
IFK Norrköping	2–0	3–0	2–0	1–0	1–1	0–0		8–1	2–2	3–0	5–1	2–0	2–0	3–2
IK Brage	2–1	0–2	1–1	0–0	2–3	0–1	2–3		1–3	0–4	1–2	1–3	2–0	1–3
Malmö FF	2–0	3–0	0–1	0–0	3–3	0–1	1–3	7–0		1–4	4–5	1–1	2–0	0–2
Trelleborgs FF	1–1	6–2	1–0	2–1	5–4	3–1	2–1	1–1	1–0		2–1	1–1	3–1	1–1
Västra Frölunda	0–2	1–0	1–1	3–1	1–2	1–5	3–2	1–0	1–2	2–1		4–1	1–1	1–2
Örebro SK	0–1	2–1	4–1	1–4	4–0	0–1	0–1	1–0	0–1	1–0	1–2		4–1	2–1
Örgryte IS	1–2	0–1	1–1	2–0	0–2	0–1	0–2	0–1	3–1	2–3	1–1	1–2		2–0
Östers IF	1–1	2–3	5–0	2–3	0–1	0–2	0–2	3–0	0–0	2–0	2–0	2–0	2–2	

Source: SFS-Bolletinen
Legend: Blue = home team win; Yellow = draw; Red = away team win.

== Season statistics ==
=== Top scorers ===
Rank	Player	Club	Goals
1	(Sweden) Henrik Bertilsson	Halmstads BK	18
1	(Sweden) Mats Lilienberg	Trelleborgs FF	18
3	(Sweden) Hans Eklund	Östers IF	16
3	(Sweden) Henrik Larsson	Helsingborgs IF	16
3	(Sweden) Dick Lidman	AIK	16
6	(Sweden) Issa Manglind	Trelleborgs FF	13
6	(Poland) Mirosław Kubisztal	Örebro SK	13
8	(Sweden) Jan-Åke Enström	BK Häcken	11
8	(Sweden) Kim Bergstrand	AIK	11
10	(Sweden) Patrik Andersson	IFK Norrköping	10
10	(Federal Republic of Yugoslavia) Milenko Vukčević	Degerfors IF	10

== Attendances ==
No.	Club	Average	Highest
1	Helsingborgs IF	10,081	17,275
2	AIK	6,974	13,847
3	IFK Göteborg	6,887	13,504
4	IFK Norrköping	6,768	19,160
5	Malmö FF	5,845	28,716
6	Degerfors IF	5,742	8,451
7	Örebro SK	4,872	12,230
8	Halmstads BK	4,829	12,907
9	Östers IF	4,190	10,593
10	Trelleborgs FF	3,556	7,012
11	Örgryte IS	2,468	7,294
12	IK Brage	2,156	4,418
13	BK Häcken	1,807	4,905
14	Västra Frölunda IF	1,514	4,301

== Sources ==
Print

- Alsiö, Martin; Frantz, Alf; Lindahl, Jimmy; Persson, Gunnar, eds. (2004). 100 år: Svenska fotbollförbundets jubileumsbok 1904-2004, del 2: statistiken. Vällingby: Stroemberg Media Group. ISBN 91-86184-59-8.
- Glanell, Tomas; Havik, Göran; Lindberg, Thomas; Persson, Gunnar; Ågren, Bengt, eds. (2004). 100 år: Svenska fotbollförbundets jubileumsbok 1904-2004, del 1. Vällingby: Stroemberg Media Group. ISBN 91-86184-59-8.
- Nylin, Lars (2004). Den nödvändiga boken om Allsvenskan: svensk fotboll från 1896 till idag, statistik, höjdpunkter lag för lag, klassiska bilder. Sundbyberg: Semic. ISBN 91-552-3168-3.

Online

- Glenning, Clas (2008). "Sweden final tables". Archived from the original on 2009-10-18.
- "SFS-Bolletinen". Sveriges Fotbollshistoriker och Statistiker. 2008. Archived from the original on 3 October 2008.
