= 1997 Allsvenskan =

73rd season of Allsvenskan

Allsvenskan
- Season: 1997
- Champions: Halmstads BK
- Relegated: Västerås SK (after play-offs); Degerfors IF; Ljungskile SK
- Champions League: Halmstads BK
- UEFA Cup: IFK Göteborg; Malmö FF; Örebro SK
- Top goalscorer: Mats Lilienberg, Halmstads BK; Christer Mattiasson, IF Elfsborg; Dan Sahlin, Örebro SK (14)
- Average attendance: 5,570

Allsvenskan 1997, part of the 1997 Swedish football season, was the 73rd Allsvenskan season played. Halmstads BK won the league ahead of runners-up IFK Göteborg, while Västerås SK, Degerfors IF and Panos Ljungskile SK were relegated.

== League table ==
Pos	Team	Pld	W	D	L	GF	GA	GD	Pts	Qualification or relegation
1	Halmstads BK (C)	26	17	1	8	49	27	+22	52	Qualification to Champions League first qualifying round
2	IFK Göteborg	26	14	7	5	50	32	+18	49	Qualification to UEFA Cup first qualifying round
3	Malmö FF	26	12	10	4	48	28	+20	46	Qualification to UEFA Cup first qualifying round
4	Örebro SK	26	13	7	6	43	34	+9	46	Qualification to Intertoto Cup second round
5	Örgryte IS	26	12	7	7	34	29	+5	43	Qualification to Intertoto Cup first round
6	Helsingborgs IF	26	10	11	5	40	28	+12	41	Qualification to Cup Winners' Cup qualifying round (Note: Helsingborg qualified for the UEFA Cup Winners' Cup as Svenska Cupen champions 1997–98.)
7	IF Elfsborg	26	12	5	9	45	35	+10	41	
8	AIK	26	9	10	7	38	26	+12	37	
9	IFK Norrköping	26	7	7	12	27	36	−9	28	
10	Trelleborgs FF	26	8	4	14	32	48	−16	28	
11	Östers IF (O)	26	4	11	11	28	44	−16	23	Qualification to Relegation play-offs
12	Västerås SK (R)	26	6	5	15	26	49	−23	23	Qualification to Relegation play-offs
13	Degerfors IF (R)	26	4	8	14	29	47	−18	20	Relegation to Division 1
14	Panos Ljungskile (R)	26	5	5	16	31	57	−26	20	Relegation to Division 1

Rules for classification: 1) points; 2) goal difference; 3) number of goals scored.
(C) Champions; (O) Play-off winners; (R) Relegated

== Relegation play-offs ==
October 29, 1997

Djurgårdens IF	1–1	Östers IF

Stockholms Stadion, Stockholm
November 5, 1997

Östers IF	2–0	Djurgårdens IF

Värensvallen, Växjö

Östers IF won 3–1 on aggregate.

November 1, 1997

BK Häcken	1–1	Västerås SK

?, Gothenburg
November 6, 1997

Västerås SK	2–4	BK Häcken

?, Västerås

BK Häcken won 5–3 on aggregate.

== Results ==
Home \ Away	AIK	DEG	HBK	HIF	IFE	IFKG	IFKN	LSK	MFF	TFF	VSK	ÖSK	ÖIS	ÖIF
AIK		1–1	0–2	2–1	2–2	0–0	1–0	6–0	1–1	3–0	1–2	2–0	1–1	2–2
Degerfors IF	2–4		0–2	1–1	2–2	1–3	1–1	2–1	3–1	1–0	0–0	1–2	0–2	2–2
Halmstads BK	1–0	2–0		3–1	3–0	6–0	1–0	3–0	3–1	1–2	2–1	3–2	3–1	2–1
Helsingborgs IF	0–0	2–2	2–1		1–0	2–0	0–0	7–0	2–1	1–1	1–2	1–1	3–1	2–0
IF Elfsborg	3–1	2–1	3–1	1–3		3–0	0–1	3–0	1–1	3–2	2–0	2–1	0–1	4–1
IFK Göteborg	3–0	2–2	2–0	2–2	2–2		4–0	1–0	1–1	4–1	2–0	5–2	2–0	3–0
IFK Norrköping	0–2	2–0	0–3	2–2	1–2	1–3		3–2	2–2	0–0	4–0	0–1	1–2	1–0
Ljungskile SK	0–3	2–0	5–2	0–1	1–1	3–4	2–1		1–2	1–0	2–2	2–3	1–1	3–0
Malmö FF	0–0	2–0	2–1	4–2	2–0	1–1	2–0	1–1		5–2	2–0	1–1	3–0	1–1
Trelleborgs FF	0–3	3–1	0–1	2–0	3–2	1–0	0–1	3–1	2–1		3–5	1–2	0–0	0–3
Västerås SK	1–1	1–3	1–0	0–1	0–3	1–2	0–0	3–1	1–2	0–2		2–2	0–4	3–0
Örebro SK	3–2	1–0	2–1	0–0	1–0	0–0	2–3	3–1	0–5	4–1	5–0		2–0	2–0
Örgryte IS	1–0	3–1	1–1	2–2	2–0	1–3	3–2	1–0	0–2	2–0	2–1	0–0		1–1
Östers IF	0–0	3–2	0–1	0–0	2–4	2–1	1–1	1–1	2–2	3–3	2–0	1–1	0–2	

Legend: Blue = home team win; Yellow = draw; Red = away team win.

== Season statistics ==
=== Top scorers ===
Rank	Player	Club	Goals
1	(Sweden) Mats Lilienberg	Halmstads BK	14
1	(Sweden) Christer Mattiasson	IF Elfsborg	14
1	(Sweden) Dan Sahlin	Örebro SK	14
4	(Sweden) Andreas Andersson	IFK Göteborg	13
4	(Sweden) Andreas Hermansson	Trelleborgs FF	13
6	(Sweden) Niclas Kindvall	Degerfors IF	12
7	(Sweden) Mattias Jonson	Helsingborgs IF	11
8	(Sweden) Hans Eklund	Östers IF	10
8	(Sweden) Yksel Osmanovski	Malmö FF	10
8	(Sweden) Stefan Pettersson	IFK Göteborg	10

== Attendances ==
#	Club	Average	Highest
1	Helsingborgs IF	9,159	14,301
2	IFK Göteborg	7,850	13,156
3	IF Elfsborg	7,507	16,232
4	Örebro SK	6,941	10,511
5	Malmö FF	6,820	17,704
6	Halmstads BK	6,736	14,184
7	AIK	6,733	13,422
8	Degerfors IF	5,176	8,799
9	IFK Norrköping	4,569	8,112
10	Västerås SK FK	4,308	10,034
11	Östers IF	3,773	7,212
12	Ljungskile SK	2,780	5,549
13	Örgryte IS	2,762	8,684
14	Trelleborgs FF	2,647	5,214

== Sources ==
Print

- Alsiö, Martin; Frantz, Alf; Lindahl, Jimmy; Persson, Gunnar, eds. (2004). 100 år: Svenska fotbollförbundets jubileumsbok 1904-2004, del 2: statistiken. Vällingby: Stroemberg Media Group. ISBN 91-86184-59-8.
- Glanell, Tomas; Havik, Göran; Lindberg, Thomas; Persson, Gunnar; Ågren, Bengt, eds. (2004). 100 år: Svenska fotbollförbundets jubileumsbok 1904-2004, del 1. Vällingby: Stroemberg Media Group. ISBN 91-86184-59-8.
- Nylin, Lars (2004). Den nödvändiga boken om Allsvenskan: svensk fotboll från 1896 till idag, statistik, höjdpunkter lag för lag, klassiska bilder. Sundbyberg: Semic. ISBN 91-552-3168-3.

Online

- Glenning, Clas (2008). "Sweden final tables". Archived from the original on 2009-10-18.
- "SFS-Bolletinen". Sveriges Fotbollshistoriker och Statistiker. 2008. Archived from the original on 3 October 2008.
