= 2000 Allsvenskan =

76th season of Allsvenskan

Allsvenskan
- Season: 2000
- Champions: Halmstads BK
- Relegated: GAIS; Västra Frölunda IF
- Champions League: Halmstads BK
- UEFA Cup: Helsingborgs IF
- Top goalscorer: Fredrik Berglund, IF Elfsborg (18)
- Average attendance: 6,976

Allsvenskan 2000, part of the 2000 Swedish football season, was the 76th Allsvenskan season played. The first match was played 8 April 2000 and the last match was played 4 November 2000. Halmstads BK won the league ahead of runners-up Helsingborgs IF, while GAIS and Västra Frölunda IF were relegated.

== Summary ==
- A total number of five teams from Gothenburg participated: IFK Göteborg, Örgryte IS, BK Häcken, GAIS and Västra Frölunda IF.
- From this season, only the team ending up at the 12th position was required to play relegation qualifying games, following the establishment of Superettan.
- When Halmstads BK won the Swedish Championship, they became the final team to be awarded the von Rosens pokal. From 2001 it was replaced by Lennart Johanssons Pokal.

== Participating clubs ==
Location of the participating clubs

Club	Last season	First season in league	First season of current spell
AIK	2nd	1924–25	1981
IF Elfsborg	9th	1926–27	1997
GAIS	2nd (Division 1 Södra)	1924–25	2000
IFK Göteborg	6th	1924–25	1977
Halmstads BK	3rd	1933–34	1993
Hammarby IF	10th	1924–25	1998
Helsingborgs IF	1st	1924–25	1993
BK Häcken	1st (Division 1 Södra)	1983	2000
IFK Norrköping	5th	1924–25	1984
GIF Sundsvall	1st (Division 1 Norra)	1965	2000
Trelleborgs FF	8th	1985	1992
Västra Frölunda IF	7th	1987	1998
Örebro SK	12th	1946–47	1989
Örgryte IS	4th	1924–25	1995

== League table ==
Pos	Team	Pld	W	D	L	GF	GA	GD	Pts	Qualification or relegation
1	Halmstads BK (C)	26	16	4	6	47	24	+23	52	Qualification to Champions League second qualifying round
2	Helsingborgs IF	26	14	4	8	51	30	+21	46	Qualification to UEFA Cup qualifying round
3	AIK	26	13	6	7	38	30	+8	45	Qualification to Intertoto Cup first round
4	IFK Göteborg	26	12	8	6	46	33	+13	44	
5	IF Elfsborg	26	13	4	9	43	37	+6	43	Qualification to UEFA Cup qualifying round (Note: Elfsborg qualified for the UEFA Cup as Svenska Cupen champions 2000–01.)
6	Trelleborgs FF	26	10	8	8	30	28	+2	38	
7	Örgryte IS	26	11	4	11	32	32	0	37	
8	Hammarby IF	26	10	6	10	34	38	−4	36	
9	IFK Norrköping	26	8	11	7	40	31	+9	35	
10	Örebro SK	26	9	6	11	44	40	+4	33	
11	GIF Sundsvall	26	7	8	11	34	42	−8	29	
12	BK Häcken (O)	26	4	13	9	40	52	−12	25	Qualification to Relegation play-offs
13	GAIS (R)	26	4	8	14	26	43	−17	20	Relegation to Superettan
14	Västra Frölunda (R)	26	3	6	17	17	62	−45	15	Relegation to Superettan

Rules for classification: 1) points; 2) goal difference; 3) number of goals scored.
(C) Champions; (O) Play-off winners; (R) Relegated

== Relegation play-offs ==
November 8, 2000

Mjällby AIF	3–2	BK Häcken

?, Hällevik
November 12, 2000

BK Häcken	3–2 (a.e.t.)	Mjällby AIF
Penalties
	6–4

?, Gothenburg

== Results ==
Home \ Away	AIK	BKH	GAIS	GIF	HBK	HAIF	HEIF	IFE	IFKG	IFKN	TFF	VF	ÖSK	ÖIS
AIK		1–1	3–1	2–1	1–0	1–0	3–2	1–1	0–1	1–1	1–0	3–0	1–2	0–1
BK Häcken	2–2		1–2	2–1	2–4	2–2	3–1	2–3	1–3	4–4	0–0	3–3	0–1	1–3
GAIS	1–2	1–1		1–1	0–0	2–4	0–4	2–3	1–1	3–0	0–0	0–0	2–2	0–2
GIF Sundsvall	1–1	3–3	2–1		1–2	0–2	1–4	2–1	2–2	1–2	4–2	3–2	2–2	0–2
Halmstads BK	4–0	4–1	1–0	2–2		4–1	3–1	1–0	2–2	0–1	1–2	2–0	0–1	0–1
Hammarby IF	0–2	0–0	2–1	0–1	2–4		0–2	2–3	1–0	3–2	1–1	3–0	2–1	1–0
Helsingborgs IF	1–4	2–2	2–0	0–1	1–0	0–0		1–1	2–1	3–1	4–0	4–0	2–2	4–1
IF Elfsborg	1–2	2–2	3–1	2–0	0–2	3–2	2–3		3–0	1–1	1–0	3–1	2–1	4–1
IFK Göteborg	2–2	6–2	3–2	1–0	1–2	3–1	2–1	1–0		2–2	3–0	0–2	4–1	2–0
IFK Norrköping	3–0	1–1	3–0	0–0	2–2	0–1	0–1	0–1	1–0		0–0	3–1	2–1	1–1
Trelleborgs FF	2–1	2–0	0–2	1–0	0–2	1–2	1–0	4–1	1–1	1–1		3–0	3–0	1–1
Västra Frölunda	1–2	0–0	2–0	2–2	0–1	0–0	0–4	1–0	1–1	0–8	0–1		0–4	1–3
Örebro SK	1–0	1–2	0–2	2–3	1–2	4–1	0–2	3–0	2–2	1–1	2–2	6–0		1–3
Örgryte IS	0–2	0–2	1–1	1–0	1–2	1–1	2–0	1–2	1–2	2–0	0–2	3–0	0–2	

Legend: Blue = home team win; Yellow = draw; Red = away team win.

== Season statistics ==
=== Top scorers ===
Rank	Player	Club	Goals
1	(Sweden) Fredrik Berglund	IF Elfsborg	18
2	(Sweden) Marcus Allbäck	Örgryte IS	16
3	(Sweden) Gustaf Andersson	IFK Göteborg	14
4	(Sweden) Kaj Eskelinen	Hammarby IF	12
4	(Brazil) Álvaro Santos	Helsingborgs IF	12
6	(Sweden) Tomas Rosenkvist	IFK Göteborg	10
6	(Sweden) Stefan Selaković	Halmstads BK	10
6	(Sweden) Rade Prica	Helsingborgs IF	10
6	(Sweden) Niklas Skoog	Malmö FF	10
6	(Sweden) Mattias Flodström	IFK Norrköping	10
6	(Sweden) Anders Svensson	IF Elfsborg	10

=== Attendances ===
	Club	Home average	Away average	Home high
1	AIK	14,474		34,004
2	Hammarby IF	12,134		33,958
3	Helsingborgs IF	9,414		13,802
4	IFK Göteborg	9,299		22,011
5	IF Elfsborg	7,625		12,514
6	GAIS	7,084		31,225
7	IFK Norrköping	7,049		12,464
8	Halmstads BK	6,950		10,343
9	Örebro SK	6,923		9,855
10	GIF Sundsvall	5,133		9,000
11	Örgryte IS	4,713		9,141
12	BK Häcken	2,661		8,379
13	Trelleborgs FF	2,432		3,348
14	Västra Frölunda IF	1,519		4,168
—	Total	6,976	—	34,004
