= 1996 Allsvenskan =

72nd season of Allsvenskan

Allsvenskan
- Season: 1996
- Champions: IFK Göteborg
- Relegated: Umeå FC (after play-offs); Djurgårdens IF; IK Oddevold
- Champions League: IFK Göteborg
- UEFA Cup: Malmö FF; Helsingborgs IF; Örebro SK
- Top goalscorer: Andreas Andersson, IFK Göteborg (19)
- Average attendance: 4,989

Allsvenskan 1996, part of the 1996 Swedish football season, was the 72nd Allsvenskan season played. IFK Göteborg won the league ahead of runners-up Malmö FF, while Umeå FC, Djurgårdens IF and IK Oddevold were relegated.

== League table ==
Pos	Team	Pld	W	D	L	GF	GA	GD	Pts	Qualification or relegation
1	IFK Göteborg (C)	26	17	5	4	61	23	+38	56	Qualification to Champions League second qualifying round
2	Malmö FF	26	13	7	6	33	26	+7	46	Qualification to UEFA Cup second qualifying round
3	Helsingborgs IF	26	13	5	8	39	26	+13	44	Qualification to UEFA Cup second qualifying round
4	AIK	26	12	7	7	36	23	+13	43	Qualification to Cup Winners' Cup first round (Note: AIK qualified for the UEFA Cup Winners' Cup as Svenska Cupen champions 1996–97.)
5	Örebro SK	26	13	3	10	34	29	+5	42	Qualification to UEFA Cup second qualifying round
6	Östers IF	26	10	6	10	37	39	−2	36	Qualification to Intertoto Cup group stage
7	Halmstads BK	26	9	8	9	34	37	−3	35	Qualification to Intertoto Cup group stage
8	IFK Norrköping	26	9	7	10	31	29	+2	34	
9	Degerfors IF	26	9	7	10	34	41	−7	34	
10	Örgryte IS	26	8	7	11	27	30	−3	31	
11	Umeå FC (R)	26	8	6	12	35	45	−10	30	Qualification to Relegation play-offs
12	Trelleborgs FF (O)	26	9	3	14	33	48	−15	30	Qualification to Relegation play-offs
13	Djurgårdens IF (R)	26	8	3	15	28	43	−15	27	Relegation to Division 1
14	IK Oddevold (R)	26	5	4	17	20	43	−23	19	Relegation to Division 1

Source: SFS-Bolletinen
Rules for classification: 1) points; 2) goal difference; 3) number of goals scored.
(C) Champions; (O) Play-off winners; (R) Relegated

== Relegation play-offs ==
October 30, 1996

Ljungskile SK	0–1	Umeå FC

Skarsjövallen, Ljungskile
November 3, 1996

Umeå FC	2–3 (ag)	Ljungskile SK

Gammliavallen, Umeå

October 30, 1996

Hammarby IF	2–1	Trelleborgs FF

Söderstadion, Stockholm
November 3, 1996

Trelleborgs FF	3–1	Hammarby IF

Vångavallen, Trelleborg

== Results ==
Home \ Away	AIK	DEG	DIF	HBK	HIF	IFKG	IFKN	IKO	MFF	TFF	UFC	ÖSK	ÖIS	ÖIF
AIK		1–1	1–0	0–0	2–1	6–0	1–0	3–1	0–1	2–3	1–1	0–2	1–0	2–3
Degerfors IF	0–0		0–2	1–1	1–0	2–7	3–1	1–0	3–0	3–1	3–1	1–0	3–1	2–1
Djurgårdens IF	0–2	3–2		1–1	3–1	0–1	1–1	2–1	0–1	1–0	2–2	2–1	4–0	2–3
Halmstads BK	3–2	3–0	1–0		1–0	3–4	1–2	3–0	2–3	1–0	2–1	1–0	1–3	2–2
Helsingborgs IF	1–0	4–1	2–1	0–0		1–1	2–2	3–1	1–2	1–2	4–0	3–0	2–1	2–0
IFK Göteborg	0–1	2–0	3–0	4–0	4–1		2–0	5–1	0–0	1–0	4–0	0–2	1–0	5–1
IFK Norrköping	1–2	0–0	2–1	0–0	0–1	1–0		1–1	0–2	3–1	0–1	1–3	2–0	3–1
IK Oddevold	0–0	1–1	1–2	0–3	0–1	0–2	0–2		1–3	3–0	2–1	0–1	0–2	3–0
Malmö FF	0–3	2–1	2–0	4–1	1–1	1–3	0–0	1–1		2–0	2–1	2–0	0–2	2–2
Trelleborgs FF	0–1	3–1	3–1	2–2	1–1	0–6	1–3	1–0	1–1		3–1	0–1	3–2	2–1
Umeå FC	2–0	2–2	4–0	2–1	0–2	1–1	3–2	2–0	0–1	4–2		3–1	1–2	1–1
Örebro SK	0–2	2–1	3–0	3–1	2–1	0–0	1–4	2–0	2–0	3–1	1–1		0–1	2–1
Örgryte IS	1–1	0–0	3–0	0–0	0–2	1–4	0–0	1–2	0–0	0–2	3–0	1–1		3–0
Östers IF	2–2	3–1	2–0	3–0	0–1	1–1	1–0	0–1	1–0	3–1	3–0	2–1	0–0	

Legend: Blue = home team win; Yellow = draw; Red = away team win.

== Season statistics ==
=== Top scorers ===
Rank	Player	Club	Goals
1	(Sweden) Andreas Andersson	IFK Göteborg	19
2	(Sweden) Marino Rahmberg	Degerfors IF	13
4	(England) Steve Galloway	Umeå FC	12
4	(Sweden) Hans Eklund	Östers IF	12
4	(Sweden) Robert Steiner	IFK Norrköping	12
6	(Sweden) Dan Sahlin	Örebro SK	11
7	(Sweden) Magnus Gustafsson	IFK Norrköping	10
8	(Federal Republic of Yugoslavia) Milenko Vukčević	Degerfors IF	9
9	(Sweden) Pascal Simpson	AIK	8
9	(Sweden) Marcus Allbäck	Örgryte IS	8
9	(Sweden) Jonas Axeldal	Östers IF	8

== Attendances ==
#	Club	Average	Highest
1	Helsingborgs IF	9,671	16,159
2	IFK Göteborg	8,245	16,476
3	Örebro SK	6,109	11,181
4	AIK	6,065	15,731
5	Umeå FC	5,550	12,127
6	Degerfors IF	5,277	7,664
7	Malmö FF	5,244	24,508
8	Halmstads BK	4,308	10,328
9	IK Oddevold	4,060	10,605
10	IFK Norrköping	4,059	9,792
11	Djurgårdens IF	3,843	11,020
12	Östers IF	2,845	6,529
13	Trelleborgs FF	2,333	4,298
14	Örgryte IS	2,216	6,188

== Sources ==
Print

- Alsiö, Martin; Frantz, Alf; Lindahl, Jimmy; Persson, Gunnar, eds. (2004). 100 år: Svenska fotbollförbundets jubileumsbok 1904-2004, del 2: statistiken. Vällingby: Stroemberg Media Group. ISBN 91-86184-59-8.
- Glanell, Tomas; Havik, Göran; Lindberg, Thomas; Persson, Gunnar; Ågren, Bengt, eds. (2004). 100 år: Svenska fotbollförbundets jubileumsbok 1904-2004, del 1. Vällingby: Stroemberg Media Group. ISBN 91-86184-59-8.
- Nylin, Lars (2004). Den nödvändiga boken om Allsvenskan: svensk fotboll från 1896 till idag, statistik, höjdpunkter lag för lag, klassiska bilder. Sundbyberg: Semic. ISBN 91-552-3168-3.

Online

- Glenning, Clas (2008). "Sweden final tables". Archived from the original on 2009-10-18.
- "SFS-Bolletinen". Sveriges Fotbollshistoriker och Statistiker. 2008. Archived from the original on 3 October 2008.
