= Västra Frölunda IF =

Swedish football club

Västra Frölunda
- Full name: Västra Frölunda Idrottsförening
- Founded: 2 January 1930; 95 years ago
- Ground: Ruddalens IP; Gothenburg; Sweden
- Capacity: 3,700
- Chairman: Simon Andersson
- Manager: Henrik Carlsson
- League: Division 2 Västra Götaland
- 2024: Division 2 Västra Götaland, 6th of 14
- Website: vastrafrolundaif.se
Home colours	Away colours

Västra Frölunda Idrottsförening (lit. 'Västra Frölunda Sports Association') is a Swedish football club based in Gothenburg. Founded on 2 January 1930, the club has spent a total of ten seasons in Allsvenskan, the top tier of Swedish football. As of the 2025 season, Västra Frölunda competes in Division 2 Västra Götaland, the fourth-highest league in Sweden. The club is affiliated with the Göteborgs Fotbollförbund.

On 20 December 2023, Västra Frölunda announced an affiliation agreement with IFK Göteborg. Under the terms of the agreement, IFK Göteborg will loan under-23 players to Västra Frölunda, while the latter will benefit from knowledge-sharing and a head coach paid by IFK Göteborg.

== Achievements ==
- Division 1 Södra
  - Champions (1): 1997
- Division 1 Västra
  - Champions (1): 1991

== Season to season ==
Season	Level	Division	Section	Position	Movements
1993	Tier 1	Allsvenskan		7th	
1994	Tier 1	Allsvenskan		11th	Relegation Playoff
1995	Tier 1	Allsvenskan		14th	Relegated
1996	Tier 2	Division 1	Södra	8th	
1997	Tier 2	Division 1	Södra	1st	Promoted
1998	Tier 1	Allsvenskan		5th	
1999	Tier 1	Allsvenskan		7th	
2000	Tier 1	Allsvenskan		14th	Relegated
2001	Tier 2	Superettan		9th	
2002	Tier 2	Superettan		3rd	Promotion Playoffs –Not Promoted
2003	Tier 2	Superettan		5th	
2004	Tier 2	Superettan		11th	
2005	Tier 2	Superettan		16th	Relegated
2006*	Tier 3	Division 1	Södra	4th	
2007	Tier 3	Division 1	Södra	3rd	
2008	Tier 3	Division 1	Södra	8th	
2009	Tier 3	Division 1	Södra	10th	
2010	Tier 3	Division 1	Södra	12th	Relegated
2011	Tier 4	Division 2	Västra Götaland	9th	
2012	Tier 4	Division 2	Västra Götaland	11th	Relegated
2013	Tier 5	Division 3	Nordvästra Götaland	6th	
2014	Tier 5	Division 3	Sydvästra Götaland	7th	
2015	Tier 5	Division 3	Nordvästra Götaland	2nd	Promotion Playoffs –Not Promoted
2016	Tier 5	Division 3	Sydvästra Götaland	5th	
2017	Tier 5	Division 3	Sydvästra Götaland	7th	
2018	Tier 5	Division 3	Nordvästra Götaland	2nd	Promotion Playoffs –Not Promoted
2019	Tier 5	Division 3	Nordvästra Götaland	1st	Promoted
2020	Tier 4	Division 2	Västra Götaland	2nd	Promotion Playoffs –Disqualified (fielded suspended player in second leg of playoff)
2021	Tier 4	Division 2	Västra Götaland	11th	
2022	Tier 4	Division 2	Västra Götaland	4th	
2023	Tier 4	Division 2	Västra Götaland	2nd	Promotion Playoffs –Not Promoted
2024	Tier 4	Division 2	Västra Götaland	6th	

* League restructuring in 2006 resulted in a new division being created at Tier 3 and subsequent divisions dropping a level.

== Attendances ==
In recent seasons Västra Frölunda IF have had the following average attendances:

Season	Average attendance	Division / Section	Level
2006	200	Div 1 Södra	Tier 3
2007	209	Div 1 Södra	Tier 3
2008	313	Div 1 Södra	Tier 3
2009	231	Div 1 Södra	Tier 3
2010	142	Div 1 Södra	Tier 3
2011	155	Div 2 Västra Götaland	Tier 4
2012	133	Div 2 Västra Götaland	Tier 4
2013	106	Div 3 Nordvästra Götaland	Tier 5
2014	121	Div 3 Sydvästra Götaland	Tier 5
2015	89	Div 3 Nordvästra Götaland	Tier 5
2016	107	Div 3 Sydvästra Götaland	Tier 5
2017	67	Div 3 Sydvästra Götaland	Tier 5
2018	?	Div 3 Nordvästra Götaland	Tier 5
2019	?	Div 3 Nordvästra Götaland	Tier 5
2020		Div 2 Västra Götaland	Tier 4

* Attendances are provided in the Publikliga sections of the Svenska Fotbollförbundet website.
