= 1994 Allsvenskan =

70th season of Allsvenskan

Allsvenskan
- Season: 1994
- Champions: IFK Göteborg
- Relegated: Landskrona BoIS; BK Häcken
- Champions League: IFK Göteborg
- UEFA Cup: Örebro SK; Malmö FF
- Top goalscorer: Niclas Kindvall, IFK Norrköping (23)
- Average attendance: 4,865

Allsvenskan 1994, part of the 1994 Swedish football season, was the 70th Allsvenskan season played. IFK Göteborg won the league ahead of runners-up Örebro SK, while Landskrona BoIS and BK Häcken were relegated.

== League table ==
Pos	Team	Pld	W	D	L	GF	GA	GD	Pts	Qualification or relegation
1	IFK Göteborg (C)	26	16	6	4	54	28	+26	54	Qualification to Champions League qualifying round
2	Örebro SK	26	15	7	4	62	30	+32	52	Qualification to UEFA Cup preliminary round
3	Malmö FF	26	14	7	5	51	33	+18	49	Qualification to UEFA Cup preliminary round
4	IFK Norrköping	26	13	8	5	52	22	+30	47	Qualification to Intertoto Cup group stage
5	Östers IF	26	13	6	7	48	30	+18	45	Qualification to Intertoto Cup group stage
6	AIK	26	11	6	9	42	41	+1	39	
7	Halmstads BK	26	10	8	8	41	39	+2	38	Qualification to Cup Winners' Cup first round (Note: Halmstad qualified for the UEFA Cup Winners' Cup as Svenska Cupen champions 1994–95.)
8	Degerfors IF	26	8	8	10	28	37	−9	32	
9	Helsingborgs IF	26	9	5	12	30	46	−16	32	
10	Trelleborgs FF	26	7	9	10	25	40	−15	30	
11	Västra Frölunda (O)	26	7	6	13	30	33	−3	27	Qualification to Relegation play-offs
12	Hammarby IF (O)	26	5	7	14	28	44	−16	22	Qualification to Relegation play-offs
13	Landskrona BoIS (R)	26	4	5	17	22	59	−37	17	Relegation to Division 1
14	BK Häcken (R)	26	2	8	16	27	58	−31	14	Relegation to Division 1

Source: SFS-Bolletinen
Rules for classification: 1) points; 2) goal difference; 3) number of goals scored.
(C) Champions; (O) Play-off winners; (R) Relegated

== Relegation play-offs ==
October 30, 1994

Västra Frölunda IF	2–0	Umeå FC

?, Gothenburg
November 5, 1994

Umeå FC	0–0	Västra Frölunda IF

?, Umeå

October 29, 1994

Kalmar FF	1–4	Hammarby IF

?, Kalmar
November 5, 1994

Hammarby IF	2–2	Kalmar FF

?, Stockholm

== Results ==
Home \ Away	AIK	BKH	DEG	HBK	HAIF	HEIF	IFKG	IFKN	BOIS	MFF	TFF	VF	ÖSK	ÖIF
AIK		3–1	3–1	2–1	2–2	3–1	0–1	2–0	3–2	1–2	4–1	1–2	1–1	2–1
BK Häcken	1–2		0–0	2–5	2–2	2–3	0–2	0–3	0–1	0–0	3–1	1–1	1–1	1–5
Degerfors IF	4–0	2–1		1–1	1–0	2–2	2–4	0–0	2–0	2–6	0–0	0–0	0–4	0–1
Halmstads BK	0–0	1–3	1–0		3–1	1–0	3–1	2–3	2–0	1–2	1–1	1–0	3–1	0–0
Hammarby IF	1–2	0–0	0–1	0–0		0–1	0–0	1–1	5–2	2–0	1–3	0–2	0–1	0–2
Helsingborgs IF	3–0	3–2	3–1	1–1	1–0		1–2	1–0	0–1	0–0	1–1	3–2	0–2	0–4
IFK Göteborg	3–1	3–1	1–1	3–4	2–1	6–3		1–0	2–1	3–4	6–0	1–2	1–1	2–0
IFK Norrköping	3–2	5–0	4–0	4–1	5–1	7–0	0–0		4–0	1–1	2–0	2–0	2–2	1–1
Landskrona BoIS	1–3	1–1	1–3	2–1	1–3	0–0	0–2	1–1		1–1	0–2	2–2	0–3	4–3
Malmö FF	2–2	5–1	1–0	3–1	4–0	2–0	1–2	2–1	3–0		0–1	0–0	3–2	1–1
Trelleborgs FF	2–0	1–1	0–2	1–1	1–1	0–3	0–0	0–1	3–0	1–2		2–1	1–1	1–3
Västra Frölunda	2–2	3–1	1–1	1–2	1–2	1–0	0–2	0–1	3–0	4–1	0–1		1–3	0–1
Örebro SK	2–0	2–1	2–0	3–3	2–4	3–0	2–2	3–0	6–1	4–1	5–0	2–1		1–2
Östers IF	1–1	3–1	1–2	4–1	4–1	3–0	0–2	1–1	1–0	2–4	1–1	1–0	2–3	

Legend: Blue = home team win; Yellow = draw; Red = away team win.

== Season statistics ==
=== Top scorers ===
Rank	Player	Club	Goals
1	(Sweden) Niclas Kindvall	IFK Norrköping	23
2	(Poland) Mirosław Kubisztal	Örebro SK	19
3	(Sweden) Dick Lidman	AIK	14
3	(Sweden) Jörgen Pettersson	Malmö FF	14
3	(Sweden) Mattias Jonson	Örebro SK	14
6	(Sweden) Mikael Martinsson	IFK Göteborg	13
7	(Sweden) Hans Eklund	Östers IF	12
7	(Sweden) Peter Wibrån	Östers IF	12
9	(Sweden) Ludwig Ernstsson	Östers IF	11
10	(Sweden) Pascal Simpson	AIK	10
10	(Sweden) Robert Andersson	Halmstads BK	10
10	(Sweden) Niklas Gudmundsson	Halmstads BK	10

== Attendances ==
#	Club	Average	Highest
1	Helsingborgs IF	8,337	12,400
2	Hammarby IF	7,824	18,704
3	IFK Göteborg	6,859	10,257
4	Örebro SK	6,083	11,216
5	Malmö FF	5,817	25,531
6	Degerfors IF	5,394	9,595
7	AIK	5,233	14,320
8	IFK Norrköping	4,635	11,850
9	Östers IF	4,381	14,123
10	Halmstads BK	3,886	6,212
11	Landskrona BoIS	3,733	8,483
12	Trelleborgs FF	2,551	5,086
13	Västra Frölunda IF	1,659	5,014
14	BK Häcken	1,615	6,360

== Sources ==
Print

- Alsiö, Martin; Frantz, Alf; Lindahl, Jimmy; Persson, Gunnar, eds. (2004). 100 år: Svenska fotbollförbundets jubileumsbok 1904-2004, del 2: statistiken. Vällingby: Stroemberg Media Group. ISBN 91-86184-59-8.
- Glanell, Tomas; Havik, Göran; Lindberg, Thomas; Persson, Gunnar; Ågren, Bengt, eds. (2004). 100 år: Svenska fotbollförbundets jubileumsbok 1904-2004, del 1. Vällingby: Stroemberg Media Group. ISBN 91-86184-59-8.
- Nylin, Lars (2004). Den nödvändiga boken om Allsvenskan: svensk fotboll från 1896 till idag, statistik, höjdpunkter lag för lag, klassiska bilder. Sundbyberg: Semic. ISBN 91-552-3168-3.

Online

- Glenning, Clas (2008). "Sweden final tables". Archived from the original on 2009-10-18.
- "SFS-Bolletinen". Sveriges Fotbollshistoriker och Statistiker. 2008. Archived from the original on 3 October 2008.
