= 1995 Allsvenskan =

71st season of Allsvenskan

Allsvenskan
- Season: 1995
- Champions: IFK Göteborg
- Relegated: Hammarby IF; Västra Frölunda IF
- Champions League: IFK Göteborg
- UEFA Cup: Helsingborgs IF; Halmstads BK; Malmö FF
- Top goalscorer: Niklas Skoog, Västra Frölunda IF (17)
- Average attendance: 5,680

Allsvenskan 1995, part of the 1995 Swedish football season, was the 71st Allsvenskan season played. IFK Göteborg won the league ahead of runners-up Helsingborgs IF, while Hammarby IF and Västra Frölunda IF were relegated.

== League table ==
Pos	Team	Pld	W	D	L	GF	GA	GD	Pts	Qualification or relegation
1	IFK Göteborg (C)	26	12	10	4	43	20	+23	46	Qualification to Champions League qualifying round
2	Helsingborgs IF	26	12	6	8	42	36	+6	42	Qualification to UEFA Cup qualifying round
3	Halmstads BK	26	11	8	7	41	32	+9	41	Qualification to UEFA Cup qualifying round
4	Malmö FF	26	9	12	5	32	28	+4	39	Qualification to UEFA Cup qualifying round
5	Örebro SK	26	10	8	8	35	29	+6	38	Qualification to Intertoto Cup group stage
6	Djurgårdens IF	26	10	8	8	33	33	0	38	Qualification to Intertoto Cup group stage
7	Örgryte IS	26	9	8	9	22	26	−4	35	Qualification to Intertoto Cup group stage
8	AIK	26	7	11	8	34	34	0	32	Qualification to Cup Winners' Cup qualifying round (Note: AIK qualified for the UEFA Cup Winners' Cup as Svenska Cupen champions 1995–96.)
9	Degerfors IF	26	7	11	8	32	45	−13	32	
10	Trelleborgs FF	26	7	10	9	32	30	+2	31	
11	Östers IF (O)	26	5	13	8	41	41	0	28	Qualification to Relegation play-offs
12	IFK Norrköping (O)	26	7	7	12	28	44	−16	28	Qualification to Relegation play-offs
13	Hammarby IF (R)	26	6	8	12	33	40	−7	26	Relegation to Division 1
14	Västra Frölunda (R)	26	5	10	11	35	45	−10	25	Relegation to Division 1

Source: SFS-Bolletinen
Rules for classification: 1) points; 2) goal difference; 3) number of goals scored.
(C) Champions; (O) Play-off winners; (R) Relegated

== Relegation play-offs ==
November 8, 1995

Gefle IF	0–1	Östers IF

Råsunda Stadium, Solna
November 12, 1995

Östers IF	3–0	Gefle IF

Värendsvallen, Växjö

November 5, 1995

GAIS	1–1	IFK Norrköping

Gamla Ullevi, Gothenburg
November 12, 1995

IFK Norrköping	1–0	GAIS

Norrköpings Idrottspark, Norrköping

== Results ==
Home \ Away	AIK	DEG	DIF	HBK	HAIF	HEIF	IFKG	IFKN	MFF	TFF	VF	ÖSK	ÖIS	ÖIF
AIK		1–2	1–2	2–2	3–2	1–1	3–1	2–2	1–1	3–0	1–1	2–0	0–0	1–1
Degerfors IF	2–1		1–1	3–3	0–0	2–2	0–3	0–3	0–3	1–0	2–0	2–1	0–0	3–2
Djurgårdens IF	1–2	2–0		0–3	2–0	1–3	1–1	2–0	0–2	1–1	4–2	2–0	1–3	1–1
Halmstads BK	3–0	5–1	1–2		1–0	2–1	0–0	2–0	2–2	1–2	1–1	2–1	2–0	2–2
Hammarby IF	1–2	2–1	0–1	0–3		2–1	2–2	0–2	1–1	1–3	3–1	2–2	0–1	2–2
Helsingborgs IF	2–1	3–3	2–3	3–0	3–5		0–3	0–0	2–1	2–1	1–0	3–0	0–1	0–2
IFK Göteborg	0–0	3–0	2–0	0–1	2–0	1–1		2–0	2–1	2–0	1–1	3–1	3–0	3–1
IFK Norrköping	1–1	1–1	2–0	1–1	1–1	0–3	0–5		0–1	2–2	0–3	1–0	0–2	4–1
Malmö FF	2–2	3–1	0–0	2–1	1–0	0–1	1–1	1–3		2–1	3–1	0–0	1–1	2–1
Trelleborgs FF	1–0	2–2	1–1	4–0	0–0	0–2	2–2	4–0	0–0		2–0	0–0	4–1	1–1
Västra Frölunda	1–1	0–0	2–2	1–1	2–6	2–3	3–0	5–1	0–0	1–0		1–2	0–1	1–1
Örebro SK	3–0	2–2	0–0	1–0	2–1	4–1	1–0	1–0	5–0	2–0	4–4		0–1	1–0
Örgryte IS	2–1	0–1	0–2	0–2	0–1	0–1	1–1	2–1	0–0	0–0	1–2	0–0		4–2
Östers IF	0–2	2–2	3–1	3–0	1–1	1–1	0–0	2–3	2–2	3–1	4–0	2–2	1–1	

Legend: Blue = home team win; Yellow = draw; Red = away team win.

== Season statistics ==
=== Top scorers ===
Rank	Player	Club	Goals
1	(Sweden) Niklas Skoog	Västra Frölunda	17
2	(Sweden) Jörgen Pettersson	Malmö FF	15
3	(Sweden) Andreas Andersson	Degerfors IF	13
4	(Poland) Mirosław Kubisztal	Örebro SK	12
4	(Sweden) Dan Sahlin	Hammarby IF	12
4	(Sweden) Patric Karlsson	IFK Norrköping	12
7	(Sweden) Hans Eklund	Östers IF	11
7	(Sweden) Bo Andersson	Djurgårdens IF	11
7	(Sweden) Robert Andersson	Halmstads BK	11
10	(Sweden) Niklas Gudmundsson	Halmstads BK	10

== Attendances ==
No.	Club	Average attendance	Highest attendance
1	Helsingborgs IF	10,940	16,015
2	IFK Göteborg	8,893	17,356
3	Hammarby IF	8,612	15,358
4	AIK	6,933	17,859
5	Djurgårdens IF	6,813	13,130
6	Örebro SK	6,076	10,006
7	Degerfors IF	6,028	9,330
8	Malmö FF	5,537	16,015
9	Halmstads BK	5,105	7,952
10	IFK Norrköping	4,069	6,986
11	Östers IF	3,476	6,494
12	Örgryte IS	2,738	11,107
13	Trelleborgs FF	2,603	4,673
14	Västra Frölunda IF	1,684	4,372

== Sources ==
Print

- Alsiö, Martin; Frantz, Alf; Lindahl, Jimmy; Persson, Gunnar, eds. (2004). 100 år: Svenska fotbollförbundets jubileumsbok 1904-2004, del 2: statistiken. Vällingby: Stroemberg Media Group. ISBN 91-86184-59-8.
- Glanell, Tomas; Havik, Göran; Lindberg, Thomas; Persson, Gunnar; Ågren, Bengt, eds. (2004). 100 år: Svenska fotbollförbundets jubileumsbok 1904-2004, del 1. Vällingby: Stroemberg Media Group. ISBN 91-86184-59-8.
- Nylin, Lars (2004). Den nödvändiga boken om Allsvenskan: svensk fotboll från 1896 till idag, statistik, höjdpunkter lag för lag, klassiska bilder. Sundbyberg: Semic. ISBN 91-552-3168-3.

Online

- Glenning, Clas (2008). "Sweden final tables". Archived from the original on 2009-10-18.
- "SFS-Bolletinen". Sveriges Fotbollshistoriker och Statistiker. 2008. Archived from the original on 3 October 2008.
