= 2005 Djurgårdens IF season =

Djurgårdens IF
2005 season
- Chairman: Bo Lundquist
- Manager: Kjell Jonevret
- Stadium: Stockholms Stadion
- Allsvenskan: Winners
- Svenska Cupen: Winners
- UEFA Cup: 2nd qualifying round
- Royal League: Semi-finals
- Top goalscorer: League: Jones Kusi-Asare (12); All: Jones Kusi-Asare (15)
- Highest home attendance: 27,108 (4 August vs Hammarby IF, Allsvenskan)
- Lowest home attendance: 1,268 (24 February vs Rosenborg BK, Royal League)

Djurgården will in the 2005 season compete in the Allsvenskan, Svenska Cupen and UEFA Cup

== Squad information ==
=== Squad ===
Note: Flags indicate national team as defined under FIFA eligibility rules; some limited exceptions apply. Players may hold more than one non-FIFA nationality.

No.	Pos.	Nation	Player
2	DF	SWE	Matias Concha
3	DF	SWE	Fredrik Stenman
4	DF	SWE	Elias Storm
5	DF	ISL	Sölvi Ottesen
6	DF	FIN	Toni Kuivasto
7	MF	SWE	Johan Arneng
8	FW	SWE	Tobias Hysén
9	FW	SWE	Jones Kusi-Asare
10	MF	SUI	Feliciano Magro
11	FW	FIN	Daniel Sjölund
12	FW	SWE	Mattias Jonson
13	MF	SWE	Stefan Bergtoft
14	MF	ISL	Kári Árnason

No.	Pos.	Nation	Player
15	GK	GAM	Pa Dembo Touray
16	DF	SWE	Markus Johannesson
17	FW	DEN	Søren Larsen (sold to Schalke 04)
18	DF	SWE	Niclas Rasck
19	FW	RSA	Siyabonga Nomvethe
20	DF	SWE	Tomas Backman
21	MF	DEN	Jesper Håkansson
22	DF	SWE	Eldin Kozica
23	FW	FRA	Ibrahim Ba
25	FW	SWE	Patrick Amoah
30	GK	SWE	Oskar Wahlström
77	MF	SWE	Abgar Barsom

== Player statistics ==
Appearances for competitive matches only.

No.	Pos	Nat	Player	Total		Allsvenskan		Svenska Cupen		UEFA Cup		2004–05 Royal League 2005–06 Royal League	
No.	Pos	Nat	Player	Apps	Goals	Apps	Goals	Apps	Goals	Apps	Goals	Apps	Goals
2		(Sweden) SWE	Matias Concha	34	0	23	0	5	0	2	0	4	0
3		(Sweden) SWE	Fredrik Stenman	38	5	26	5	6	0	2	0	4	0
4		(Sweden) SWE	Elias Storm	7	0	5	0	2	0	0	0	0	0
5		(Iceland) ISL	Sölvi Ottesen	5	0	2	0	1	0	0	0	2	0
6		(Finland) FIN	Toni Kuivasto	40	6	26	3	5	2	2	0	7	1
7		(Sweden) SWE	Johan Arneng	39	3	24	3	6	0	2	0	7	0
8		(Sweden) SWE	Tobias Hysén	38	13	25	9	5	2	2	0	6	2
9		(Sweden) SWE	Jones Kusi-Asare	35	15	24	12	4	3	2	0	5	0
10		(Switzerland) SUI	Felix Magro	18	1	13	1	3	0	0	0	2	0
11		(Finland) FIN	Daniel Sjölund	36	14	22	7	6	6	2	0	6	1
12		(Sweden) SWE	Mattias Jonson	16	5	10	4	2	0	2	0	2	1
13		(Sweden) SWE	Stefan Bergtoft	10	0	5	0	2	0	0	0	3	0
14		(Iceland) ISL	Kári Árnason	33	2	21	0	4	1	1	0	7	1
15	GK	(The Gambia) GAM	Pa Dembo Touray	31	1	26	1	1	0	2	0	2	0
16		(Sweden) SWE	Markus Johannesson	39	0	24	0	6	0	2	0	7	0
17		(Denmark) DEN	Søren Larsen	16	13	12	10	2	3	0	0	2	0
18		(Sweden) SWE	Niclas Rasck	28	0	18	0	3	0	2	0	5	0
19		(South Africa) RSA	Siyabonga Nomvethe	11	2	5	1	2	0	0	0	4	1
20		(Sweden) SWE	Tomas Backman	2	0	0	0	1	0	0	0	1	0
21		(Denmark) DEN	Jesper Håkansson	4	0	1	0	0	0	0	0	3	0
22		(Sweden) SWE	Eldin Kozica	2	0	0	0	1	0	0	0	1	0
23		(France) FRA	Ibrahim Ba	16	1	14	1	1	0	1	0	0	0
25		(Sweden) SWE	Patrick Amoah	30	3	17	1	6	2	2	0	5	0
30	GK	(Sweden) SWE	Oskar Wahlström	10	0	0	0	5	0	0	0	5	0
77		(Sweden) SWE	Abgar Barsom	29	3	21	2	4	1	2	0	2	0
		(Sweden) SWE	Stefan Batan	1	0	0	0	0	0	0	0	1	0
		(South Africa) RSA	Rowan Hendricks	0	0	0	0	0	0	0	0	0	0
		(Sweden) SWE	Isper Igualikinya	0	0	0	0	0	0	0	0	0	0
		(South Africa) RSA	Mbulelo Mabizela	0	0	0	0	0	0	0	0	0	0
		(Sweden) SWE	Mtaka Simba	1	0	0	0	0	0	0	0	1	0
		(Sweden) SWE	Robert Stoltz	2	0	0	0	0	0	0	0	2	0
		(Sweden) SWE	Samuel Wowoah	2	0	0	0	0	0	0	0	2	0

=== Goals ===
==== Total ====
Name	Goals
(Sweden) Jones Kusi-Asare	15
(Finland) Daniel Sjölund	14
(Sweden) Tobias Hysén	13
(Denmark) Søren Larsen	13
(Finland) Toni Kuivasto	6
(Sweden) Mattias Jonson	5
(Sweden) Fredrik Stenman	5
(Sweden) Johan Arneng	3
(Sweden) Abgar Barsom	3
(Sweden) Patrick Amoah	3
(South Africa) Siyabonga Nomvethe	2
(Iceland) Kári Árnason	2
(France) Ibrahim Ba	1
(Switzerland) Feliciano Magro	1
(The Gambia) Pa Dembo Touray	1

==== Allsvenskan ====
Name	Goals
(Sweden) Jones Kusi-Asare	12
(Denmark) Søren Larsen	10
(Sweden) Tobias Hysén	9
(Finland) Daniel Sjölund	7
(Sweden) Fredrik Stenman	5
(Sweden) Mattias Jonson	4
(Sweden) Johan Arneng	3
(Finland) Toni Kuivasto	3
(Sweden) Abgar Barsom	2
(Sweden) Patrick Amoah	1
(France) Ibrahim Ba	1
(Switzerland) Feliciano Magro	1
(South Africa) Siyabonga Nomvethe	1
(The Gambia) Pa Dembo Touray	1

==== Svenska Cupen ====
Name	Goals
(Finland) Daniel Sjölund	6
(Sweden) Jones Kusi-Asare	3
(Denmark) Søren Larsen	3
(Sweden) Patrick Amoah	2
(Sweden) Tobias Hysén	2
(Finland) Toni Kuivasto	2
(Sweden) Abgar Barsom	1
(Iceland) Kári Árnason	1

==== Royal League ====
Name	Goals
(Sweden) Tobias Hysén	2
(Finland) Daniel Sjölund	1
(Sweden) Mattias Jonson	1
(Finland) Toni Kuivasto	1
(South Africa) Siyabonga Nomvethe	1
(Iceland) Kári Árnason	1

== Competitions ==
=== Allsvenskan ===
==== League table ====
Pos	Team	Pld	W	D	L	GF	GA	GD	Pts	Qualification or relegation
1	Djurgårdens IF (C)	26	16	5	5	60	26	+34	53	Qualification to Champions League second qualifying round
2	IFK Göteborg	26	14	7	5	38	22	+16	49	Qualification to UEFA Cup first qualifying round
3	Kalmar FF	26	11	10	5	36	21	+15	43	Qualification to Intertoto Cup first round
4	Hammarby IF	26	12	7	7	43	30	+13	43	
5	Malmö FF	26	12	5	9	38	27	+11	41	

Source: svenskfotboll.se (in Swedish)
Rules for classification: 1) points; 2) goal difference; 3) number of goals scored.
(C) Champions

==== Results summary ====
Overall								Home						Away					
Pld	W	D	L	GF	GA	GD	Pts	W	D	L	GF	GA	GD	W	D	L	GF	GA	GD
26	16	5	5	60	26	+34	53	9	3	1	40	13	+27	7	2	4	20	13	+7

Last updated: 29 April.
Source: svenskfotboll.se (in Swedish)

==== Matches ====
Date	Venue	Opponents	Score	Comp	Djurgården scorers	Attendance
2005-04-11	Stadion	Häcken	2-1	Allsvenskan	Hysén, Stenman	12 823
2005-04-19	Örjans Vall	Halmstad	1-3	Allsvenskan	Larsen	7 038
2005-04-25	Stadion	ÖIS	2-2	Allsvenskan	Larsen, Arneng	10 507
2005-05-02	Borås Arena	Elfsborg	2-1	Allsvenskan	Arneng, Larsen	8 933
2005-05-09	Stadion	Gefle	3-1	Allsvenskan	Kusi-Asare, Ba, Larsen	10 310
2005-05-18	Söderstadion	Hammarby	1-2	Allsvenskan	Kusi-Asare	15 322
2005-05-23	Stadion	Assyriska	3-1	Allsvenskan	Larsen(2), Barsom	12 114
2005-05-29	Fredriksskans	Kalmar	2-0	Allsvenskan	Kusi-Asare(2)	7 185
2005-06-13	Råsunda	Göteborg	0-0	Allsvenskan		16 771
2005-06-16	Malmö Stadion	Malmö	3-1	Allsvenskan	Kusi-Asare, Larsen, Sjölund	20 135
2005-06-20	Råsunda	Helsingborg	5-2	Allsvenskan	Hysén(2), Kuivasto, Barsom, Larsen,	13 907
2005-06-27	Landskrona IP	Landskrona	2-0	Allsvenskan	Larsen(2)	5 257
2005-07-11	Idrottsparken	Sundsvall	1-1	Allsvenskan	Hysén	7 741
2005-07-18	Stadion	Sundsvall	4-0	Allsvenskan	Sjölund(2), Magro, Kusi-Asare	12 878
2005-07-27	Stadion	Landskrona	0-1	Allsvenskan		12 340
2005-08-01	Olympia	Helsingborg	0-2	Allsvenskan		16 000
2005-08-04	Råsunda	Hammarby	2-2	Allsvenskan	Kusi-Asare, Stenman	27 108
2005-08-14	Strömvallen	Gefle	3-1	Allsvenskan	Sjölund(2), Kusi-Asare	7 198
2005-08-21	Stadion	Kalmar	3-1	Allsvenskan	Kuivasto(2), Kusi-Asare	12 912
2005-08-28	Stadion	Assyriska	2-0	Allsvenskan	Hysén	5 755
2005-09-12	Stadion	Malmö	2-0	Allsvenskan	Jonson, Stenman	14 181
2005-09-19	Ullevi	Göteborg	3-1	Allsvenskan	Hysén, Nomvethe	25 438
2005-09-25	Rambergsvallen	Häcken	0-1	Allsvenskan		3 177
2005-10-03	Stadion	Halmstad	6-1	Allsvenskan	Jonson(2), Hysén, Stenman, Kusi-Asare, Arneng	13 022
2005-10-17	Gamla Ullevi	ÖIS	0-0	Allsvenskan		9 293
2005-10-23	Stadion	Elfsborg	8-1	Allsvenskan	Kusi-Asare(2), Sjölund(2), Stenman, Jonson, Touray, Amoah	14 102

=== Svenska Cupen ===
==== 2nd round ====
Date	Venue	Opponents	Score	Round	Djurgården scorers	Attendance
2005-04-21	Grenadjärvallen	Rynninge	3-1	Round 2	Larsen (2), Kuivasto	1 276

==== 3rd round ====
Date	Venue	Opponents	Score	Round	Djurgården scorers	Attendance
2005-05-05	Vilundavallen	Väsby	2-0	Round 3	Larsen, Barsom	2 383

==== 4th round ====
Date	Venue	Opponents	Score	Round	Djurgården scorers	Attendance
2005-06-10	Enskede IP	Enskede	5-1	Round 4	Kusi-Asare (3), Amoah, Sjölund	2 437

==== Quarter-finals ====
Date	Venue	Opponents	Score	Round	Djurgården scorers	Attendance
2005-07-22	Brovallens IP	Ölme	6-0	Quarterfinal	Sjölund (3), Hysén, Árnason, Amoah	2 808

==== Semi-finals ====
Date	Venue	Opponents	Score	Round	Djurgården scorers	Attendance
2005-09-22	Stadion	Elfsborg	2-1	Semifinal	Sjölund (2)	4 679

==== Final ====
Date	Venue	Opponents	Score	Round	Djurgården scorers	Attendance
2005-10-29	Råsunda	Åtvidaberg	2-0	Final	Kuivasto, Hysén	11 613

=== UEFA Cup ===
==== UEFA Cup 1st round ====
Date	Venue	Opponents	Score	Round	Djurgården scorers	Attendance
2005-08-11	Råsunda	(Republic of Ireland) Cork	1-1	Qual	og	4 854
2005-08-25	(Republic of Ireland) Turners Cross	(Republic of Ireland) Cork	0-0	Qual		?

=== 2004–05 Royal League ===
==== 1st group stage ====
Pos	Team	Pld	W	D	L	GF	GA	GD	Pts	Qualification
1	(Norway) Vålerenga IF	6	5	1	0	10	4	+6	16	Advanced to second group stage
2	(Norway) Rosenborg BK	6	3	1	2	10	9	+1	10	Advanced to second group stage
3	(Denmark) Esbjerg fB	6	2	1	3	6	5	+1	7	
4	(Sweden) Djurgårdens IF	6	0	1	5	5	13	−8	1	

Pos	Team	Pld	W	D	L	GF	GA	GD	Pts	Qualification
1	(Denmark) FC Copenhagen	6	4	2	0	8	1	+7	14	Advanced to second group stage
2	(Sweden) IFK Göteborg	6	3	1	2	6	3	+3	10	Advanced to second group stage
3	(Denmark) Brøndby IF	6	2	1	3	7	9	−2	7	
4	(Norway) Tromsø IL	6	0	2	4	3	11	−8	2	

Pos	Team	Pld	W	D	L	GF	GA	GD	Pts	Qualification
1	(Sweden) Malmö FF	6	4	0	2	9	8	+1	12	Advanced to second group stage
2	(Norway) SK Brann	6	3	1	2	8	6	+2	10	Advanced to second group stage
3	(Sweden) Halmstads BK	6	2	2	2	7	6	+1	8	
4	(Denmark) Odense BK	6	1	1	4	7	11	−4	4	

Pos	Team	Pld	W	D	L	GF	GA	GD	Pts	Qualification
1	(Denmark) FC Copenhagen	4	2	1	1	5	4	+1	7	Advanced to final
2	(Sweden) Malmö FF	4	2	0	2	6	6	0	6	
3	(Norway) Rosenborg BK	4	1	1	2	6	7	−1	4	

Pos	Team	Pld	W	D	L	GF	GA	GD	Pts	Qualification
1	(Sweden) IFK Göteborg	4	3	1	0	7	3	+4	10	Advanced to final
2	(Norway) Vålerenga IF	4	1	2	1	6	6	0	5	
3	(Norway) SK Brann	4	0	1	3	2	6	−4	1	

12 February 2005 Matchday 4	Djurgårdens IF	0 – 1	Vålerenga IF	Solna
16:00				Stadium: Råsunda Stadium; Attendance: 5,281

17 February 2005 Matchday 5	Esbjerg fB	1 – 0	Djurgårdens IF	Esbjerg
18:30				Stadium: Esbjerg Idrætspark; Attendance: 2,473

24 February 2005 Matchday 6	Djurgårdens IF	0 – 1	Rosenborg BK	Solna
20:35				Stadium: Råsunda Stadium; Attendance: 1,268

=== 2005–06 Royal League ===
==== Group stage ====
Pos	Team	Pld	W	D	L	GF	GA	GD	Pts	Qualification
1	(Sweden) Djurgårdens IF	6	3	1	2	8	7	+1	10	Advanced to knockout stage
2	(Norway) Lyn Oslo	6	2	2	2	7	6	+1	8	Advanced to knockout stage
3	(Sweden) IFK Göteborg	6	2	2	2	7	7	0	8	Advanced to knockout stage
4	(Denmark) AaB	6	1	3	2	7	9	−2	6	

Date	Venue	Opponents	Score	Round	Djurgården scorers	Attendance
2005-11-24	(Denmark) Aalborg Stadion	(Denmark) AaB	3-1	Group 3	Hysén(2), Sjölund	5 246
2005-11-27	Södertälje Fotbollsarena	Göteborg	0-1	Group 3		2 238
2005-12-08	(Norway) Ullevaal	(Norway) Lyn	3-1	Group 3	Kuivasto, Nomvethe	1 050
2005-12-13	Södertälje Fotbollsarena	(Denmark) AaB	3-1	Group 3	Jonson, Árnason	1 309

The tournament continued in the 2006 season.
