= 2004 Djurgårdens IF season =

Djurgården
2004 season
- Chairman: Bo Lundquist
- Manager: Kjell Jonevret
- Stadium: Råsunda Stadium
- Allsvenskan: 4th
- Svenska Cupen: Winner
- Champions League: 3rd qualifying round
- UEFA Cup: 1st round
- Royal League: 1st group stage
- Top goalscorer: League: Andreas Johansson (11); All: Andreas Johansson (18)
- Highest home attendance: 32,590 (13 April vs AIK, Allsvenskan)
- Lowest home attendance: 2,209 (5 December vs Esbjerg fB, Royal League)

2004 Djurgårdens IF season covers the team composition, events, and results of the 2004 season for the Swedish association football team Djurgårdens IF.

Djurgårdens finished in fourth place in the Allsvenskan league table.

== Squad information ==
=== Squad ===
Note: Flags indicate national team as defined under FIFA eligibility rules; some limited exceptions apply. Players may hold more than one non-FIFA nationality.

| No. | Pos. | Nation | Player |
|---|---|---|---|
| 2 | DF | SWE | Matias Concha |
| 3 | DF | SWE | Fredrik Stenman |
| 4 | DF | SWE | Elias Storm |
| 5 | DF | ISL | Sölvi Ottesen |
| 6 | DF | FIN | Toni Kuivasto |
| 7 | MF | SWE | Johan Arneng |
| 8 | FW | SWE | Tobias Hysén |
| 9 | FW | NED | Geert den Ouden |
| 10 | MF | SWE | Andreas Johansson |
| 11 | FW | FIN | Daniel Sjölund |
| 12 | DF | SWE | Markus Karlsson |
| 13 | MF | SWE | Stefan Bergtoft |
| 14 | FW | SWE | Babis Stefanidis |
| 15 | GK | SWE | Andreas Isaksson |

| No. | Pos. | Nation | Player |
|---|---|---|---|
| 15 | GK | GAM | Pa Dembo Touray |
| 16 | MF | SWE | Markus Johannesson |
| 17 | FW | DEN | Søren Larsen |
| 18 | DF | SWE | Niclas Rasck |
| 19 | MF | SVN | Juraj Dovičovič |
| 20 | DF | SWE | Tomas Backman |
| 21 | DF | SWE | Richard Spong |
| 22 | FW | GAM | Aziz Corr Nyang |
| 23 | MF | COD | Yannick Bapupa |
| 24 | FW | COD | René Makondele |
| 30 | GK | SWE | Oskar Wahlström |
| 77 | MF | SWE | Abgar Barsom |

== Player statistics ==
Appearances for competitive matches only

| No. | Pos | Nat | Player | Total | | Allsvenskan | | Svenska Cupen | | Champions League UEFA Cup | | Royal League | |
| No. | Pos | Nat | Player | Apps | Goals | Apps | Goals | Apps | Goals | Apps | Goals | Apps | Goals |
|---|---|---|---|---|---|---|---|---|---|---|---|---|---|
| 2 | | (Sweden) SWE | Matias Concha | 33 | 0 | 22 | 0 | 6 | 0 | 5 | 0 | 0 | 0 |
| 3 | | (Sweden) SWE | Fredrik Stenman | 41 | 4 | 26 | 3 | 7 | 1 | 5 | 0 | 3 | 0 |
| 4 | | (Sweden) SWE | Elias Storm | 29 | 3 | 16 | 1 | 4 | 0 | 6 | 0 | 3 | 2 |
| 5 | | (Iceland) ISL | Sölvi Ottesen | 5 | 0 | 4 | 0 | 1 | 0 | 0 | 0 | 0 | 0 |
| 6 | | (Finland) FIN | Toni Kuivasto | 38 | 0 | 24 | 0 | 5 | 0 | 6 | 0 | 3 | 0 |
| 7 | | (Sweden) SWE | Johan Arneng | 40 | 6 | 25 | 3 | 6 | 2 | 6 | 1 | 3 | 0 |
| 8 | | (Sweden) SWE | Tobias Hysén | 40 | 10 | 25 | 3 | 6 | 2 | 6 | 3 | 3 | 2 |
| 9 | | (Netherlands) NED | Geert den Ouden | 17 | 5 | 13 | 4 | 2 | 1 | 2 | 0 | 0 | 0 |
| 10 | | (Sweden) SWE | Andreas Johansson | 37 | 18 | 23 | 11 | 5 | 4 | 6 | 3 | 3 | 0 |
| 11 | | (Finland) FIN | Daniel Sjölund | 26 | 4 | 17 | 1 | 4 | 3 | 2 | 0 | 3 | 0 |
| 12 | | (Sweden) SWE | Markus Karlsson | 25 | 0 | 15 | 0 | 2 | 0 | 5 | 0 | 3 | 0 |
| 13 | | (Sweden) SWE | Stefan Bergtoft | 7 | 1 | 7 | 1 | 0 | 0 | 0 | 0 | 0 | 0 |
| 14 | | (Sweden) SWE | Babis Stefanidis | 13 | 3 | 10 | 2 | 3 | 1 | 0 | 0 | 0 | 0 |
| 15 | | (Sweden) SWE | Andreas Isaksson | 7 | 0 | 7 | 0 | 0 | 0 | 0 | 0 | 0 | 0 |
| 15 | | (The Gambia) GAM | Pa Dembo Touray | 29 | 0 | 17 | 0 | 3 | 0 | 6 | 0 | 3 | 0 |
| 16 | | (Sweden) SWE | Markus Johannesson | 25 | 0 | 13 | 0 | 3 | 0 | 6 | 0 | 3 | 0 |
| 17 | | (Denmark) DEN | Søren Larsen | 2 | 0 | 1 | 0 | 0 | 0 | 0 | 0 | 1 | 0 |
| 18 | | (Sweden) SWE | Niclas Rasck | 7 | 0 | 3 | 0 | 1 | 0 | 3 | 0 | 0 | 0 |
| 19 | | (Slovenia) SVN | Juraj Dovičovič | 14 | 1 | 8 | 1 | 2 | 0 | 4 | 0 | 0 | 0 |
| 19 | | (Sweden) SWE | Pär Cederqvist | 4 | 0 | 3 | 0 | 1 | 0 | 0 | 0 | 0 | 0 |
| 20 | | (Sweden) SWE | Tomas Backman | 15 | 1 | 11 | 1 | 3 | 0 | 0 | 0 | 1 | 0 |
| 21 | | (Sweden) SWE | Richard Spong | 1 | 0 | 0 | 0 | 0 | 0 | 0 | 0 | 1 | 0 |
| 22 | | (The Gambia) GAM | Aziz Corr Nyang | 4 | 0 | 2 | 0 | 2 | 0 | 0 | 0 | 0 | 0 |
| 23 | | (Democratic Republic of the Congo) COD | Yannick Bapupa | 31 | 1 | 20 | 1 | 3 | 0 | 6 | 0 | 2 | 0 |
| 24 | | (Democratic Republic of the Congo) COD | René Makondele | 23 | 2 | 15 | 1 | 4 | 1 | 3 | 0 | 1 | 0 |
| 25 | | (Sweden) SWE | Patrick Amoah | 17 | 3 | 10 | 2 | 2 | 0 | 3 | 0 | 2 | 1 |
| 30 | | (Sweden) SWE | Oskar Wahlström | 8 | 0 | 5 | 0 | 3 | 0 | 0 | 0 | 0 | 0 |
| 77 | | (Sweden) SWE | Abgar Barsom | 22 | 2 | 15 | 1 | 1 | 0 | 6 | 1 | 0 | 0 |
| | | (Iceland) ISL | Kári Árnason | 0 | 0 | 0 | 0 | 0 | 0 | 0 | 0 | 0 | 0 |
| | | (Brazil) BRA | Marcelinho Paulista | 0 | 0 | 0 | 0 | 0 | 0 | 0 | 0 | 0 | 0 |
| | | (Netherlands) NED | Nordin Wooter | 0 | 0 | 0 | 0 | 0 | 0 | 0 | 0 | 0 | 0 |

=== Topscorers ===
==== Total ====
| Name | Goals |
|---|---|
| (Sweden) Andreas Johansson | 18 |
| (Sweden) Tobias Hysén | 10 |
| (Sweden) Johan Arneng | 6 |
| (Netherlands) Geert den Ouden | 5 |
| (Sweden) Fredrik Stenman | 4 |
| (Finland) Daniel Sjölund | 4 |
| (Sweden) Babis Stefanidis | 3 |
| (Sweden) Patrick Amoah | 3 |
| (Sweden) Elias Storm | 3 |
| (Democratic Republic of the Congo) René Makondele | 2 |
| (Sweden) Abgar Barsom | 2 |
| (Sweden) Stefan Bergtoft | 1 |
| (Slovakia) Juraj Dovičovič | 1 |
| (Sweden) Tomas Backman | 1 |
| (Democratic Republic of the Congo) Yannick Bapupa | 1 |

==== Allsvenskan ====
| Name | Goals |
|---|---|
| (Sweden) Andreas Johansson | 11 |
| (Netherlands) Geert den Ouden | 4 |
| (Sweden) Tobias Hysén | 3 |
| (Sweden) Johan Arneng | 3 |
| (Sweden) Fredrik Stenman | 3 |
| (Sweden) Patrick Amoah | 2 |
| (Sweden) Babis Stefanidis | 2 |
| (Sweden) Tomas Backman | 1 |
| (Democratic Republic of the Congo) Yannick Bapupa | 1 |
| (Sweden) Abgar Barsom | 1 |
| (Sweden) Stefan Bergtoft | 1 |
| (Slovakia) Juraj Dovičovič | 1 |
| (Democratic Republic of the Congo) René Makondele | 1 |
| (Finland) Daniel Sjölund | 1 |
| (Sweden) Elias Storm | 1 |

==== Svenska Cupen ====
| Name | Goals |
|---|---|
| (Sweden) Andreas Johansson | 4 |
| (Finland) Daniel Sjölund | 3 |
| (Sweden) Johan Arneng | 2 |
| (Sweden) Tobias Hysén | 2 |
| (Sweden) Daniel Sjölund | 1 |
| (Democratic Republic of the Congo) René Makondele | 1 |
| (Netherlands) Geert den Ouden | 1 |
| (Sweden) Babis Stefanidis | 1 |
| (Sweden) Fredrik Stenman | 1 |

==== Europe ====
| Name | Goals |
|---|---|
| (Sweden) Tobias Hysén | 5 |
| (Sweden) Andreas Johansson | 3 |
| (Sweden) Elias Storm | 2 |
| (Sweden) Johan Arneng | 1 |
| (Sweden) Abgar Barsom | 1 |
| (Sweden) Patrick Amoah | 1 |

== Competitions ==
=== Allsvenskan ===
==== League table ====
| Pos | Team | Pld | W | D | L | GF | GA | GD | Pts | Qualification or relegation |
|---|---|---|---|---|---|---|---|---|---|---|
| 2 | Halmstads BK | 26 | 14 | 8 | 4 | 53 | 27 | +26 | 50 | Qualification to UEFA Cup second qualifying round |
| 3 | IFK Göteborg | 26 | 14 | 5 | 7 | 33 | 20 | +13 | 47 | Qualification to Intertoto Cup first round |
| 4 | Djurgårdens IF | 26 | 11 | 8 | 7 | 38 | 32 | +6 | 41 | Qualification to UEFA Cup second qualifying round (Note: Djurgården qualified for the UEFA Cup as Svenska Cupen champions 2004.) |
| 5 | Kalmar FF | 26 | 10 | 10 | 6 | 27 | 18 | +9 | 40 | |
| 6 | Hammarby IF | 26 | 10 | 7 | 9 | 28 | 28 | 0 | 37 | |

Source: svenskfotboll.se (in Swedish)
Rules for classification: 1) points; 2) goal difference; 3) number of goals scored.

==== Matches ====
| Date | Venue | Opponents | Score | Comp | Djurgården scorers | Attendance |
|---|---|---|---|---|---|---|
| 2004-04-05 | Vångavallen | Trelleborg | 2-2 | Allsvenskan | Hysén, Johansson | 6 154 |
| 2004-04-13 | Råsunda | AIK | 3-1 | Allsvenskan | Stefanidis, Bergtoft, Johansson | 32 590 |
| 2004-04-19 | Olympia | Helsingborg | 1-1 | Allsvenskan | Johansson | 10 254 |
| 2004-04-25 | Råsunda | Sundsvall | 3-1 | Allsvenskan | Johansson, den Ouden(2) | 11 755 |
| 2004-05-02 | Landskrona IP | Landskrona | 0-2 | Allsvenskan | | 6 387 |
| 2004-05-09 | Råsunda | Kalmar | 0-3 | Allsvenskan | | 11 308 |
| 2004-05-12 | Ryavallen | Elfsborg | 0-0 | Allsvenskan | | 5 520 |
| 2004-05-18 | Råsunda | Göteborg | 1-2 | Allsvenskan | Johansson | 15 079 |
| 2004-05-24 | Råsunda | ÖIS | 2-1 | Allsvenskan | Sjölund, Stefanidis | 8 711 |
| 2004-07-07 | Örjans Vall | Halmstad | 2-2 | Allsvenskan | og, den Ouden | 13 297 |
| 2004-07-14 | Råsunda | Malmö | 0-2 | Allsvenskan | | 13 380 |
| 2004-07-19 | Råsunda | Hammarby | 0-3 | Allsvenskan | | 24 165 |
| 2004-07-24 | Råsunda | Örebro | 5-1 | Allsvenskan | og, Arneng, den Ouden, Hysén, Amoah | 7 701 |
| 2004-07-31 | Fredriksskans | Kalmar | 1-1 | Allsvenskan | Bapupa | 9 031 |
| 2004-08-07 | Råsunda | Landskrona | 1-1 | Allsvenskan | Dovičovič | 6 998 |
| 2004-08-15 | Råsunda | Halmstad | 1-1 | Allsvenskan | Johansson | 11 656 |
| 2004-08-21 | Gamla Ullevi | ÖIS | 1-0 | Allsvenskan | Hysén | 3 554 |
| 2004-08-30 | Eyravallen | Örebro | 2-0 | Allsvenskan | Storm, Arneng | 8 103 |
| 2004-09-11 | Råsunda | Hammarby | 1-0 | Allsvenskan | Makondele | 20 750 |
| 2004-09-20 | Malmö Stadion | Malmö | 0-2 | Allsvenskan | | 18 218 |
| 2004-09-23 | Råsunda | AIK | 1-1 | Allsvenskan | Stenman | 18 876 |
| 2004-09-26 | Råsunda | Trelleborg | 5-0 | Allsvenskan | Johansson, Stenman, Backman, Amoah, Barsom | 5 448 |
| 2004-10-04 | Ullevi | Göteborg | 0-2 | Allsvenskan | | 21 749 |
| 2004-10-17 | Råsunda | Elfsborg | 3-2 | Allsvenskan | Johansson(2), Arneng | 5 661 |
| 2004-10-25 | Idrottsparken | Sundsvall | 1-0 | Allsvenskan | Johansson | 6 158 |
| 2004-10-30 | Råsunda | Helsingborg | 2-1 | Allsvenskan | Johansson, Stenman | 9 148 |

=== Svenska Cupen ===
| Date | Venue | Opponents | Score | Comp | Djurgården scorers | Attendance |
|---|---|---|---|---|---|---|
| 2004-05-05 | Timrå IP | IFK Timrå | 3-1 | 1/64-final | Stefanidis, Hysén, Stenman | 2 706 |
| 2004-05-21 | Stadion | Helsingborgs IF | 3-1 | 1/32-final | Arneng, Johansson, Hysén | 2 706 |
| 2004-07-02 | Stadion | GIF Sundsvall | 3-1 | 1/16-final | Arneng, Makondele, den Ouden | 3 520 |
| 2004-07-14 | Idrottsparken | IFK Norrköping | 1-0 | 1/8-final | Johansson | 6 507 |
| 2004-10-20 | Värendsvallen | Östers IF | 2-0 | Semi-final | Sjölund, Johansson | 1 977 |
| 2004-11-06 | Råsunda | IFK Göteborg | 3-1 | Final | Sjölund(2), Johansson | 9 417 |

=== Champions League ===
==== 2nd qualifying round ====
| 28 July 2004 | Djurgården (Sweden) | 0 – 0 | (Lithuania) Kaunas | Solna |
| | | UEFA Report | | Stadium: Råsunda; Attendance: 6,679; Referee: (Romania) Balaj |

| 4 August 2004 | Kaunas (Lithuania) | 0 – 2 | (Sweden) Djurgården | Kaunas |
| | | UEFA Report | Johansson 25'; Barsom 68' | Stadium: Darius Girenas; Attendance: 3,500; Referee: (Serbia and Montenegro) Tanovic |

Djurgården won 2 – 0 on aggregate.

==== 3rd qualifying round ====
| 10 August 2004 | Juventus (Italy) | 2 – 2 | (Sweden) Djurgården | Turin |
| | Trezeguet 50'; Emerson 59' | UEFA Report | Johansson (pen.), 45+1'; Hysén 49' | Stadium: Stadio delle Alpi; Attendance: 26,146; Referee: (Germany) Fandel |

| 25 August 2004 | Djurgården (Sweden) | 1 – 4 | (Italy) Juventus | Solna |
| | Arneng 19' | UEFA Report | Del Piero 10'; Trezeguet 35', 87'; Nedvěd 54' | Stadium: Råsunda; Attendance: 32,058; Referee: (England) Poll |

Juventus won 6 – 3 on aggregate.

=== UEFA Cup ===
==== UEFA Cup 1st round ====
| 16 September 2004 | Utrecht (Netherlands) | 4 – 0 | (Sweden) Djurgården | Utrecht |
| | van de Haar 3'; Tanghe 27', 89' van den Bergh 75' | UEFA Report | | Stadium: Stadion Galgenwaard; Attendance: 17,000; Referee: (Georgia (country)) Paniashvili |

| 30 September 2004 | Djurgården (Sweden) | 3 – 0 | (Netherlands) Utrecht | Solna |
| | Johansson 3', Hysén 40', 81' | Report | | Stadium: Råsunda; Attendance: 4,449; Referee: (Austria) Stuchlik |

Utrecht won 4 – 3 on aggregate.

=== Royal League ===
==== 1st group stage ====
| Pos | Team | Pld | W | D | L | GF | GA | GD | Pts | Qualification |
|---|---|---|---|---|---|---|---|---|---|---|
| 1 | (Norway) Vålerenga IF | 6 | 5 | 1 | 0 | 10 | 4 | +6 | 16 | Advanced to second group stage |
| 2 | (Norway) Rosenborg BK | 6 | 3 | 1 | 2 | 10 | 9 | +1 | 10 | Advanced to second group stage |
| 3 | (Denmark) Esbjerg fB | 6 | 2 | 1 | 3 | 6 | 5 | +1 | 7 | |
| 4 | (Sweden) Djurgårdens IF | 6 | 0 | 1 | 5 | 5 | 13 | −8 | 1 | |

| Pos | Team | Pld | W | D | L | GF | GA | GD | Pts | Qualification |
|---|---|---|---|---|---|---|---|---|---|---|
| 1 | (Denmark) FC Copenhagen | 6 | 4 | 2 | 0 | 8 | 1 | +7 | 14 | Advanced to second group stage |
| 2 | (Sweden) IFK Göteborg | 6 | 3 | 1 | 2 | 6 | 3 | +3 | 10 | Advanced to second group stage |
| 3 | (Denmark) Brøndby IF | 6 | 2 | 1 | 3 | 7 | 9 | −2 | 7 | |
| 4 | (Norway) Tromsø IL | 6 | 0 | 2 | 4 | 3 | 11 | −8 | 2 | |

| Pos | Team | Pld | W | D | L | GF | GA | GD | Pts | Qualification |
|---|---|---|---|---|---|---|---|---|---|---|
| 1 | (Sweden) Malmö FF | 6 | 4 | 0 | 2 | 9 | 8 | +1 | 12 | Advanced to second group stage |
| 2 | (Norway) SK Brann | 6 | 3 | 1 | 2 | 8 | 6 | +2 | 10 | Advanced to second group stage |
| 3 | (Sweden) Halmstads BK | 6 | 2 | 2 | 2 | 7 | 6 | +1 | 8 | |
| 4 | (Denmark) Odense BK | 6 | 1 | 1 | 4 | 7 | 11 | −4 | 4 | |

| Pos | Team | Pld | W | D | L | GF | GA | GD | Pts | Qualification |
|---|---|---|---|---|---|---|---|---|---|---|
| 1 | (Denmark) FC Copenhagen | 4 | 2 | 1 | 1 | 5 | 4 | +1 | 7 | Advanced to final |
| 2 | (Sweden) Malmö FF | 4 | 2 | 0 | 2 | 6 | 6 | 0 | 6 | |
| 3 | (Norway) Rosenborg BK | 4 | 1 | 1 | 2 | 6 | 7 | −1 | 4 | |

| Pos | Team | Pld | W | D | L | GF | GA | GD | Pts | Qualification |
|---|---|---|---|---|---|---|---|---|---|---|
| 1 | (Sweden) IFK Göteborg | 4 | 3 | 1 | 0 | 7 | 3 | +4 | 10 | Advanced to final |
| 2 | (Norway) Vålerenga IF | 4 | 1 | 2 | 1 | 6 | 6 | 0 | 5 | |
| 3 | (Norway) SK Brann | 4 | 0 | 1 | 3 | 2 | 6 | −4 | 1 | |

| 11 November 2004 Matchday 1 | Rosenborg BK | 4 – 4 | Djurgårdens IF | Trondheim |
| 20:30 | Brattbakk 14', 17'; Helstad 61', 92' | Report | Hysén 39'; Storm 42', 71'; Amoah 72' | Stadium: Lerkendal Stadion; Attendance: 7,925; Referee: Mikael Svendsen |

| 2 December 2004 Matchday 1 | Vålerenga IF | 3 – 1 | Djurgårdens IF | Oslo |
| 20:00 | Fredheim Holm 25'; Iversen 68', 88' | Report | Hysén 65' | Stadium: Vallhall Arena; Attendance: 4,307; Referee: Klaus Bo Larsen |

| 5 December 2004 Matchday 3 | Djurgårdens IF | 0 – 3 | Esbjerg fB | Solna |
| 15:00 | | Report | Berglund 7', 19'; Thorup 24' | Stadium: Råsunda Stadium; Attendance: 2,009; Referee: Tommy Skjerven |

The tournament continued in the 2005 season.

=== Friendlies ===
| Date | Venue | Opponents | Score | Comp | Djurgården scorers | Attendance |
|---|---|---|---|---|---|---|
| 2004-02-13 | (Denmark) Birkerød | (Denmark) FC København | 1-4 | Friendly | ? | ? |
| 2004-02-25 | Skytteholms IP | Västerås SK | 1-3 | Friendly | Cederqvist | 1 351 |
| 2004-02-28 | Skytteholms IP | FC Café Opera | 0-0 | Friendly | | ? |
| 2004-03-05 | (Denmark) NRGi Park | (Denmark) OB | 1-3 | Friendly | Hysén | 200 |
| 2004-03-07 | (Denmark) NRGi Park | (Denmark) AGF | 0-2 | Friendly | | 200 |
| 2004-03-13 | (Norway) ABRA-hallen | (Norway) Rosenborg | 0-5 | Friendly | | 500 |
| 2004-03-17 | Portugal | (Portugal) Portimonense | 2-1 | Friendly | ? | ? |
| 2004-03-24 | (Portugal) Alcochete | (Portugal) Sporting CP | 2-1 | Friendly | ? | ? |
| 2004-03-27 | Graningevallen | (Estonia) FC Flora | 5-0 | Friendly | den Ouden(2), Hysén, Sjölund, René Makondele | 2 000 |
| 2004-03-31 | Graningevallen | Assyriska | 0-2 | Friendly | | ? |
| 2004-06-16 | Gammliavallen | Umeå FC | 2-0 | Friendly | Amoah, Barsom | 1 340 |
| 2004-06-23 | Domnarvsvallen | IK Brage | 6-0 | Friendly | ? | 300 |
| 2004-06-29 | Norrtälje | (Denmark) AaB Aalborg | 5-4 | Friendly | den Ouden(2), Hysén, Concha, Dovičovič | 1 500 |
| 2004-11-24 | Graningevallen | IK Frej | 2-0 | Friendly | Johannesson, Sjölund | ? |
