= 2006 Djurgårdens IF season =

Djurgårdens IF
2006 season
- Chairman: Bo Lundquist
- Manager: Kjell Jonevret (sacked); Anders Grönhagen
- Stadium: Stockholms Stadion
- Allsvenskan: 6th
- Svenska Cupen: 4th round
- UEFA Champions League: 2nd qualifying round
- Top goalscorer: League: Mattias Jonson & Jones Kusi-Asare (6); All: Tobias Hysén (11)
- Highest home attendance: 31,890 (20 September vs AIK, Allsvenskan)
- Lowest home attendance: 1,130 (23 February vs Vålerenga IF, Royal League)

Djurgården competed in the 2006 season in the Allsvenskan, Svenska Cupen and UEFA Champions League

== Squad information ==
=== Squad ===
Note: Flags indicate national team as defined under FIFA eligibility rules; some limited exceptions apply. Players may hold more than one non-FIFA nationality.

| No. | Pos. | Nation | Player |
|---|---|---|---|
| 2 | DF | (Sweden) SWE | Matias Concha |
| 3 | DF | (Sweden) SWE | Robert Stoltz |
| 4 | DF | (Sweden) SWE | Elias Storm |
| 5 | DF | (Iceland) ISL | Sölvi Ottesen |
| 6 | DF | (Finland) FIN | Toni Kuivasto |
| 7 | MF | (Sweden) SWE | Johan Arneng |
| 8 | FW | (Sweden) SWE | Tobias Hysén |
| 9 | FW | (Sweden) SWE | Jones Kusi-Asare |
| 10 | MF | (Switzerland) SUI | Feliciano Magro |
| 11 | FW | (Finland) FIN | Daniel Sjölund |
| 12 | FW | (Sweden) SWE | Mattias Jonson |
| 13 | MF | (Sweden) SWE | Stefan Bergtoft |
| 14 | MF | (Iceland) ISL | Kári Árnason |
| 15 | GK | (The Gambia) GAM | Pa Dembo Touray |

| No. | Pos. | Nation | Player |
|---|---|---|---|
| 16 | DF | (Sweden) SWE | Markus Johannesson |
| 17 | FW | (Sweden) SWE | Stefan Batan |
| 18 | DF | (Sweden) SWE | Niclas Rasck |
| 19 | FW | (Brazil) BRA | Thiago Quirino da Silva |
| 20 | FW | (Sweden) SWE | Patrick Amoah |
| 21 | MF | (Denmark) DEN | Jesper Håkansson |
| 22 | MF | (Slovenia) SVN | Andrej Komac |
| 23 | MF | (South Africa) RSA | Lance Davids |
| 24 | DF | (Sweden) SWE | Dennis Boskailo |
| 25 | MF | (Brazil) BRA | Enrico Cardoso Nazaré |
| 26 | FW | (Sweden) SWE | Kristian Junegard |
| 30 | GK | (Sweden) SWE | Oskar Wahlström |
| 35 | GK | (Sweden) SWE | Paolos Xanthopoulos |
| 77 | MF | (Sweden) SWE | Abgar Barsom |

== Player statistics ==
Appearances for competitive matches only.

| No. | Pos | Nat | Player | Total | | Allsvenskan | | Svenska Cupen | | Champions League | | Royal League | |
| No. | Pos | Nat | Player | Apps | Goals | Apps | Goals | Apps | Goals | Apps | Goals | Apps | Goals |
|---|---|---|---|---|---|---|---|---|---|---|---|---|---|
| 2 | | (Sweden) SWE | Matias Concha | 27 | 2 | 20 | 2 | 0 | 0 | 1 | 0 | 6 | 0 |
| 3 | | (Sweden) SWE | Robert Stoltz | 27 | 0 | 20 | 0 | 1 | 0 | 0 | 0 | 6 | 0 |
| 4 | | (Sweden) SWE | Elias Storm | 9 | 0 | 4 | 0 | 1 | 0 | 2 | 0 | 2 | 0 |
| 5 | | (Iceland) ISL | Sölvi Ottesen | 6 | 0 | 6 | 0 | 0 | 0 | 0 | 0 | 0 | 0 |
| 6 | | (Finland) FIN | Toni Kuivasto | 33 | 0 | 23 | 0 | 3 | 0 | 2 | 0 | 5 | 0 |
| 7 | | (Sweden) SWE | Johan Arneng | 28 | 1 | 19 | 0 | 3 | 1 | 2 | 0 | 4 | 0 |
| 8 | | (Sweden) SWE | Tobias Hysén | 26 | 11 | 15 | 5 | 3 | 2 | 2 | 0 | 6 | 4 |
| 9 | | (Sweden) SWE | Jones Kusi Asare | 22 | 7 | 17 | 6 | 3 | 0 | 2 | 1 | 0 | 0 |
| 10 | | (Switzerland) SUI | Felix Magro | 13 | 0 | 8 | 0 | 1 | 0 | 0 | 0 | 4 | 0 |
| 11 | | (Finland) FIN | Daniel Sjölund | 32 | 2 | 26 | 2 | 3 | 0 | 2 | 0 | 1 | 0 |
| 12 | | (Sweden) SWE | Mattias Jonson | 28 | 7 | 21 | 6 | 0 | 0 | 2 | 0 | 5 | 1 |
| 13 | | (Sweden) SWE | Stefan Bergtoft | 7 | 0 | 4 | 0 | 1 | 0 | 0 | 0 | 2 | 0 |
| 14 | | (Iceland) ISL | Kári Árnason | 21 | 2 | 14 | 0 | 3 | 2 | 1 | 0 | 3 | 0 |
| 15 | | (The Gambia) GAM | Pa Dembo Touray | 34 | 0 | 25 | 0 | 2 | 0 | 2 | 0 | 5 | 0 |
| 16 | | (Sweden) SWE | Markus Johannesson | 36 | 0 | 26 | 0 | 3 | 0 | 2 | 0 | 5 | 0 |
| 17 | | (Sweden) SWE | Stefan Batan | 27 | 2 | 19 | 2 | 2 | 0 | 0 | 0 | 6 | 0 |
| 18 | | (Sweden) SWE | Niclas Rasck | 12 | 0 | 8 | 0 | 2 | 0 | 0 | 0 | 2 | 0 |
| 19 | | (Brazil) BRA | Thiago Quirino da Silva | 26 | 2 | 18 | 1 | 3 | 1 | 2 | 0 | 3 | 0 |
| 20 | | (Sweden) SWE | Patrick Amoah | 0 | 0 | 0 | 0 | 0 | 0 | 0 | 0 | 0 | 0 |
| 21 | | (Denmark) DEN | Jesper Håkansson | 6 | 2 | 0 | 0 | 0 | 0 | 0 | 0 | 6 | 2 |
| 22 | | (Slovenia) SVN | Andrej Komac | 18 | 1 | 15 | 1 | 1 | 0 | 2 | 0 | 0 | 0 |
| 23 | | (South Africa) RSA | Lance Davids | 24 | 5 | 17 | 5 | 3 | 0 | 0 | 0 | 4 | 0 |
| 24 | | (Sweden) SWE | Dennis Boskailo | 0 | 0 | 0 | 0 | 0 | 0 | 0 | 0 | 0 | 0 |
| 25 | | (Brazil) BRA | Enrico Cardoso Nazaré | 17 | 1 | 15 | 0 | 0 | 0 | 2 | 1 | 0 | 0 |
| 26 | | (Sweden) SWE | Kristian Junegard | 0 | 0 | 0 | 0 | 0 | 0 | 0 | 0 | 0 | 0 |
| 30 | | (Sweden) SWE | Oskar Wahlström | 4 | 0 | 2 | 0 | 1 | 0 | 0 | 0 | 1 | 0 |
| 77 | | (Sweden) SWE | Abgar Barsom | 20 | 1 | 11 | 1 | 3 | 0 | 1 | 0 | 5 | 0 |
| | | (Sweden) SWE | Tomas Backman | 1 | 0 | 0 | 0 | 0 | 0 | 0 | 0 | 1 | 0 |
| | | (Sweden) SWE | Tobias Bergenwall | 0 | 0 | 0 | 0 | 0 | 0 | 0 | 0 | 0 | 0 |
| | | (Sweden) SWE | Viktor Bergström | 0 | 0 | 0 | 0 | 0 | 0 | 0 | 0 | 0 | 0 |
| | | (Ghana) GHA | Yussif Chibsah | 0 | 0 | 0 | 0 | 0 | 0 | 0 | 0 | 0 | 0 |
| | | (Sweden) SWE | Mattias Folkesson | 0 | 0 | 0 | 0 | 0 | 0 | 0 | 0 | 0 | 0 |
| | | (Sweden) SWE | Jonas Hellgren | 0 | 0 | 0 | 0 | 0 | 0 | 0 | 0 | 0 | 0 |
| | | (Sweden) SWE | Philip Hellquist | 0 | 0 | 0 | 0 | 0 | 0 | 0 | 0 | 0 | 0 |
| | | (Sweden) SWE | Robert Hellquist | 0 | 0 | 0 | 0 | 0 | 0 | 0 | 0 | 0 | 0 |
| | | (Sweden) SWE | Nick Holmgren | 0 | 0 | 0 | 0 | 0 | 0 | 0 | 0 | 0 | 0 |
| | | (Sweden) SWE | Per Johansson | 0 | 0 | 0 | 0 | 0 | 0 | 0 | 0 | 0 | 0 |
| | | (Sweden) SWE | Christoffer Karlsson | 0 | 0 | 0 | 0 | 0 | 0 | 0 | 0 | 0 | 0 |
| | | (Sweden) SWE | Eldin Kozica | 0 | 0 | 0 | 0 | 0 | 0 | 0 | 0 | 0 | 0 |
| | | (Sweden) SWE | Anton Lindberg | 0 | 0 | 0 | 0 | 0 | 0 | 0 | 0 | 0 | 0 |
| | | (Sweden) SWE | Srdjan Marjanovic | 0 | 0 | 0 | 0 | 0 | 0 | 0 | 0 | 0 | 0 |
| | | (Sweden) SWE | Peter Nyström | 0 | 0 | 0 | 0 | 0 | 0 | 0 | 0 | 0 | 0 |
| | | (Sweden) SWE | Robbin Sellin | 0 | 0 | 0 | 0 | 0 | 0 | 0 | 0 | 0 | 0 |
| | | (Sweden) SWE | Mtaka Simba | 0 | 0 | 0 | 0 | 0 | 0 | 0 | 0 | 0 | 0 |
| | | (Sweden) SWE | Tommi Vaiho | 0 | 0 | 0 | 0 | 0 | 0 | 0 | 0 | 0 | 0 |

=== Goals ===
==== Total ====
| Name | Goals |
|---|---|
| (Sweden) Jones Kusi-Asare | 7 |
| (Sweden) Tobias Hysén | 7 |
| (Sweden) Mattias Jonson | 6 |
| (South Africa) Lance Davids | 5 |
| (Sweden) Stefan Batan | 2 |
| (Sweden) Matias Concha | 2 |
| (Finland) Daniel Sjölund | 2 |
| (Brazil) Thiago Quirino da Silva | 2 |
| (Iceland) Kári Árnason | 2 |
| (Sweden) Abgar Barsom | 1 |
| (Slovenia) Andrej Komac | 1 |
| (Brazil) Enrico Cardoso Nazaré | 1 |
| (Sweden) Johan Arneng | 1 |

==== Allsvenskan ====
| Name | Goals |
|---|---|
| (Sweden) Mattias Jonson | 6 |
| (Sweden) Jones Kusi-Asare | 6 |
| (Sweden) Tobias Hysén | 5 |
| (South Africa) Lance Davids | 5 |
| (Sweden) Stefan Batan | 2 |
| (Sweden) Matias Concha | 2 |
| (Finland) Daniel Sjölund | 2 |
| (Sweden) Abgar Barsom | 1 |
| (Slovenia) Andrej Komac | 1 |
| (Brazil) Thiago Quirino da Silva | 1 |

==== Svenska Cupen ====
| Name | Goals |
|---|---|
| (Sweden) Tobias Hysén | 2 |
| (Iceland) Kári Árnason | 2 |
| (Sweden) Johan Arneng | 1 |
| (Brazil) Thiago Quirino da Silva | 1 |

==== Champions League ====
| Name | Goals |
|---|---|
| (Sweden) Jones Kusi-Asare | 1 |
| (Brazil) Enrico Cardoso Nazaré | 1 |

== Competitions ==
=== Allsvenskan ===
==== League table ====
| Pos | Team | Pld | W | D | L | GF | GA | GD | Pts | Qualification or relegation |
|---|---|---|---|---|---|---|---|---|---|---|
| 4 | Helsingborgs IF | 26 | 11 | 9 | 6 | 44 | 34 | +10 | 42 | Qualification to UEFA Cup first qualifying round (Note: Helsingborg qualified for the UEFA Cup as Svenska Cupen champions 2006.) |
| 5 | Kalmar FF | 26 | 12 | 5 | 9 | 39 | 30 | +9 | 41 | |
| 6 | Djurgårdens IF | 26 | 11 | 7 | 8 | 31 | 25 | +6 | 40 | |
| 7 | Malmö FF | 26 | 10 | 8 | 8 | 43 | 39 | +4 | 38 | |
| 8 | IFK Göteborg | 26 | 9 | 9 | 8 | 39 | 36 | +3 | 36 | |

Source: svenskfotboll.se (in Swedish)
Rules for classification: 1) points; 2) goal difference; 3) number of goals scored.

==== Matches ====
| Date | Venue | Opponents | Score | Comp | Djurgården scorers | Attendance |
|---|---|---|---|---|---|---|
| 2006-04-20 | Fredriksskans | Kalmar FF | 1-0 | Allsvenskan | Batan | 4 802 |
| 2006-04-10 | Råsunda (H) | Hammarby | 0-0 | Allsvenskan | | 30 139 |
| 2006-04-17 | Örjans Vall | Halmstad | 0-0 | Allsvenskan | | 6 172 |
| 2006-04-24 | Stadion | IFK Göteborg | 1-0 | Allsvenskan | Jonson | 13 095 |
| 2006-04-27 | Råsunda | AIK | 1-3 | Allsvenskan | Hysén | 34 174 |
| 2006-05-02 | Stadion | Gefle | 1-0 | Allsvenskan | Quirino | 9 699 |
| 2006-05-07 | Gamla Ullevi | GAIS | 1-1 | Allsvenskan | Batan | 7 055 |
| 2006-05-11 | Stadion | Malmö FF | 2-3 | Allsvenskan | Concha, Hysén | 13 622 |
| 2006-05-14 | Värendsvallen | Östers IF | 3-0 | Allsvenskan | Kusi-Asare(2), Hysén | 5 045 |
| 2006-07-16 | Stadion | IF Elfsborg | 1-1 | Allsvenskan | Barsom | 10 371 |
| 2006-07-20 | Ullevi | BK Häcken | 2-0 | Allsvenskan | Kusi-Asare(2) | 10 956 |
| 2006-07-29 | Stadion | Örgryte IS | 2-2 | Allsvenskan | Komac, Hysén | 9 915 |
| 2006-08-05 | Råsunda | Helsingborgs IF | 2-1 | Allsvenskan | Concha, Hysén | 14 875 |
| 2006-08-13 | Olympia | Helsingborgs IF | 1-1 | Allsvenskan | Jonson | 12 500 |
| 2006-08-19 | Stadion | Kalmar FF | 0-1 | Allsvenskan | | 9 587 |
| 2006-08-28 | Söderstadion | Hammarby IF | 3-0* | Allsvenskan | Davids, Jonson, Kusi-Asare | 15 092 |
| 2006-09-11 | Stadion | GAIS | 0-2 | Allsvenskan | | 9 815 |
| 2006-09-16 | Malmö Stadion | Malmö FF | 1-0 | Allsvenskan | Sjölund | 15 162 |
| 2006-09-20 | Råsunda | AIK | 0-1 | Allsvenskan | | 31 890 |
| 2006-09-25 | Strömvallen | Gefle IF | 0-2 | Allsvenskan | | 5 502 |
| 2006-10-01 | Stadion | Halmstads BK | 2-1 | Allsvenskan | Kusi-Asare, Davids | 7 509 |
| 2006-10-17 | Ullevi | IFK Göteborg | 2-3 | Allsvenskan | Jonson, Davids | 7 102 |
| 2006-10-22 | Stadion | BK Häcken | 2-1 | Allsvenskan | Sjölund, Davids | 6 521 |
| 2006-10-25 | Ullevi | Örgryte IS | 1-1 | Allsvenskan | Jonson | 3 088 |
| 2006-10-30 | Stadion | Östers IF | 2-0 | Allsvenskan | Davids, Jonson | 6 672 |
| 2006-11-05 | Borås Arena | IF Elfsborg | 0-1 | Allsvenskan | | 16 572 |

- Hammarby-Djurgården ended in the beginning of second half because fan riots from the Hammarby supporters. The result was 3-0 and it became also the result of the game. Hammarby also lost 6 points because of this.

=== Champions League ===
==== 2nd qualifying round ====
| 26 July 2006 1st leg | Djurgårdens IF (Sweden) | 1 – 0 | (Slovakia) Ružomberok | Solna |
| 20:00 | Enrico 70' | Report MatchCentre | | Stadium: Råsunda Stadium; Referee: Alexandru Tudor (Romania) |

| 2 August 2006 2nd leg | Ružomberok (Slovakia) | 3 – 1 | (Sweden) Djurgårdens IF | Ružomberok |
| 20:00 | Žofčák 14'; Tomčák 18'; Nezmar 88' | Report MatchCentre | Kusi-Asare 75' | Stadium: Štadión MFK Ružomberok; Referee: Hervé Piccirillo (France) |

Ružomberok won 3–2 on aggregate.

=== Royal League ===
==== Group stage ====
| Date | Venue | Opponents | Score | Round | Djurgården scorers | Attendance |
|---|---|---|---|---|---|---|
| 2006-02-12 | Ullevi | Göteborg | 0-2 | Group 3 | | 3 349 |
| 2006-02-16 | Södertälje Fotbollsarena | (Norway) Lyn | 1-1 | Group 3 | Hysén | 1 244 |

==== Quarter-finals ====
| Date | Venue | Opponents | Score | Round | Djurgården scorers | Attendance |
|---|---|---|---|---|---|---|
| 2006-02-23 | Södertälje Fotbollsarena | (Norway) Vålerenga | 2-1 | Quarterfinal 1 | Hysén(2) | 1 130 |
| 2006-03-09 | (Norway) Tønsberg Gressbane | (Norway) Vålerenga | 3-1 | Quarterfinal 2 | Jonson, Håkansson, Hysén, | ? |

==== Semifinals ====
| Date | Venue | Opponents | Score | Round | Djurgården scorers | Attendance |
|---|---|---|---|---|---|---|
| 2006-03-16 | Södertälje Fotbollsarena | (Norway) Lillestrøm | 1-3 | Semifinal 1 | Håkansson | 2 180 |
| 2006-03-26 | (Norway) Åråsen | (Norway) Lillestrøm | 0-1 | Semifinal 2 | | 4 301 |
