= Daniel Sjölund =

Finnish footballer (born 1983)

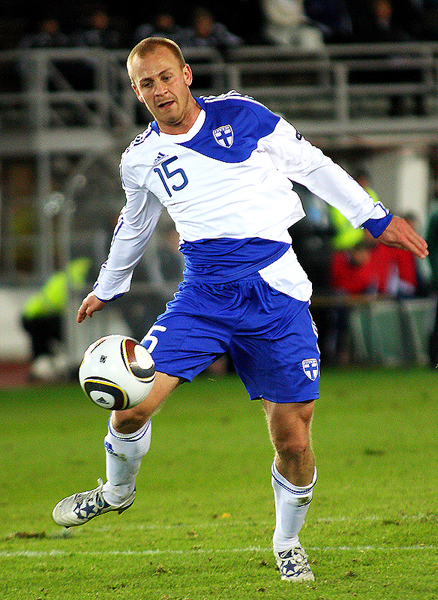
- Sjölund with Finland in 2010

Personal information
- Full name: Henrik Daniel Sjölund
- Date of birth: 22 April 1983 (age 43)
- Place of birth: Finström, Åland, Finland
- Height: 1.80 m (5 ft 11 in)
- Position: Attacking midfielder

Team information
- Current team: IFK Mariehamn (assistant)

Youth career
- –1998: IF Finströms Kamraterna

Senior career*
Years	Team	Apps	(Gls)
1998–1999	IFK Mariehamn	27	(11)
1999	IF Brommapojkarna	9	(0)
1999–2000	West Ham United	0	(0)
2000–2003	Liverpool	0	(0)
2003	→ Djurgårdens IF (loan)	19	(3)
2004–2012	Djurgårdens IF	186	(24)
2013–2014	Åtvidabergs FF	51	(6)
2015–2018	IFK Norrköping	88	(6)
2019	IFK Mariehamn	23	(0)
2020–2021	FC Åland	10	(2)
Total		380	(41)

International career
	Finland U21	18	(5)
2003–2012	Finland	37	(2)

Managerial career
- 2021–2023: FC Åland
- 2023–: IFK Mariehamn (assistant)
- * Club domestic league appearances and goals

Henrik Daniel "Daja" Sjölund (born 22 April 1983) is a Finnish football coach and a former footballer who played as a midfielder. Sjölund is currently working as an assistant coach of Veikkausliiga club IFK Mariehamn. He is best remembered for his stints with Djurgårdens IF and IFK Norrköping. He won 37 caps for the Finland national team.

== Career ==
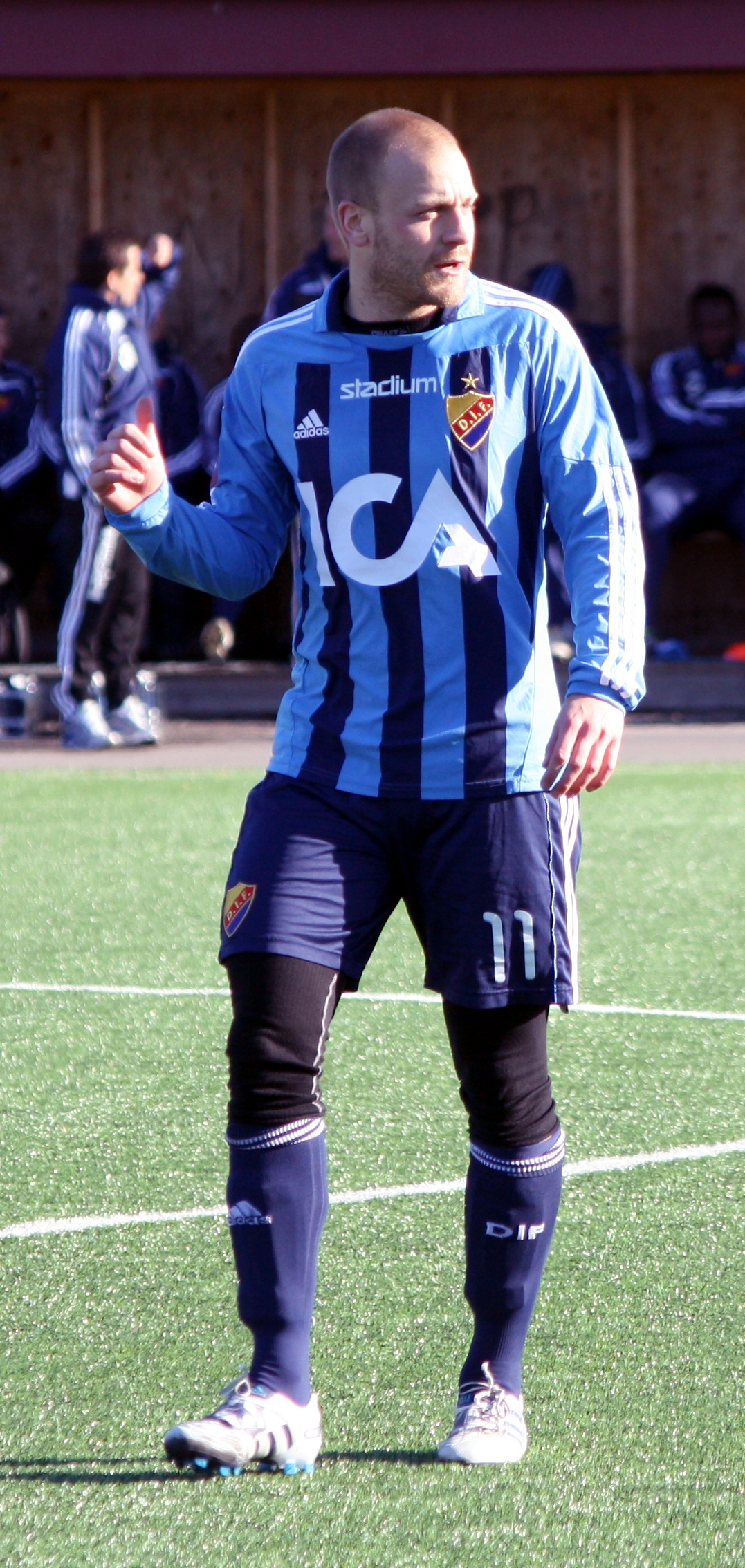
Sjölund playing for Djurgården in 2011.

Daniel Sjölund was born in the municipality of Finström, based in Åland which is a Swedish-speaking autonomous region that belongs to Finland. Sjölund started his career at IF Finströms Kamraterna, when he was a child. Afterwards he went to IFK Mariehamn and IF Brommapojkarna, before being signed by West Ham at the age of just 16, after impressive displays for Finland's youth teams. In 2000 Liverpool manager Gérard Houllier agreed to pay £1 million for the talented forward in a deal that also saw Rigobert Song going the other way. After failing to get into the first team at Liverpool, Sjölund joined Djurgården for the 2003 season, first on loan and later on a permanent deal. He has won two Swedish championships and two Swedish Cups with Djurgården. The 2005 season finally saw Sjölund become a regular in the Djurgården team, and he scored seven goals in the league.

A regular for the Under-21s since the age of 17, Sjölund made his senior international debut for the Finnish national team on 22 May 2003 against Norway. Good performances in the 2005 season have seen him promoted to the senior team on a regular basis. Sjölund was also a part of the Finland squad at the 2001 FIFA World Youth Championship.

In September 2012 Sjölund played his 200th league game for Djurgården wearing a number 200 shirt. But only a couple of months later the club announced that they would not be extending his contract.

Sjölund signed with Åtvidabergs FF on 4 February 2013 and stayed with the club for two seasons. He signed a pre-contract with local rivals IFK Norrköping during the 2014 season, and joined the squad for the 2015 season.

Sjölund re-signed with IFK Mariehamn for the 2019 season. In mid October, it was announced that Sjölund had retired from football.

Sjölund returned to playing after less than a year of retirement, this time with Finnish fourth-tier club FC Åland.

== Coaching career ==
In November 2021 Sjölund announced that he had signed a three-year contract to manage FC Åland. In September 2023, he was appointed as the assistant coach of Veikkausliiga club IFK Mariehamn for the rest of the 2023 season. After the season, his contract was extended for two more years for same position.

== Personal information ==
His sister Annica Sjölund is also a Finnish international who competed in Women's Euro 2009.

== Career statistics ==
As of 26 September 2019

Club statistics
Club	Season	League			Cup		League Cup		Europe		Other		Total	
Club	Season	Division	Apps	Goals	Apps	Goals	Apps	Goals	Apps	Goals	Apps	Goals	Apps	Goals
IFK Mariehamn	1998	Kakkonen	18	4			—		—		—		18	4
IFK Mariehamn	1999	Kakkonen	9	7			—		—		—		9	7
IFK Mariehamn	Total		27	11	0	0	—		—		—		27	11
Brommapojkarna	1999	Division 1 Norra	9	0			—		—				9	0
Brommapojkarna	Total		9	0	0	0	—		—		0	0	9	0
West Ham	1999–00	Premier League	0	0	0	0	0	0	0	0	0	0	0	0
West Ham	2000–01	Premier League	0	0	0	0	0	0	0	0	0	0	0	0
West Ham	Total		0	0	0	0	0	0	0	0	0	0	0	0
Liverpool	2000–01	Premier League	0	0	0	0	0	0	0	0	0	0	0	0
Liverpool	2001–02	Premier League	0	0	0	0	0	0	0	0	0	0	0	0
Liverpool	2002–03	Premier League	0	0	0	0	0	0	0	0	0	0	0	0
Liverpool	Total		0	0	0	0	0	0	0	0	0	0	0	0
Djurgården	2003	Allsvenskan	19	3	3	1	—		1	0			23	4
Djurgården	2004	Allsvenskan	17	1	4	3	—		2	0	3	0	26	4
Djurgården	2005	Allsvenskan	22	7	6	6	—		2	0	6	1	36	14
Djurgården	2006	Allsvenskan	26	2	3	0	—		2	0	1	0	32	2
Djurgården	2007	Allsvenskan	23	5	1	0	—						24	5
Djurgården	2008	Allsvenskan	10	1	0	0	—		3	0			13	1
Djurgården	2009	Allsvenskan	19	3	0	0	—				0	0	19	3
Djurgården	2010	Allsvenskan	14	0	0	0	—						14	0
Djurgården	2011	Allsvenskan	28	2	2	1	—						30	3
Djurgården	2012	Allsvenskan	27	3	1	0	—						28	3
Djurgården	Total		205	27	20	11	—		10	0	10	1	245	39
Åtvidaberg	2013	Allsvenskan	28	6	4	1	—						32	7
Åtvidaberg	2014	Allsvenskan	23	0	3	1	—						26	1
Åtvidaberg	Total		51	6	7	2	—		0	0	0	0	58	8
IFK Norrköping	2015	Allsvenskan	28	2	5	0	—						33	2
IFK Norrköping	2016	Allsvenskan	27	2	5	0	—		2	0			34	2
IFK Norrköping	2017	Allsvenskan	25	1	4	0	—		3	0			32	1
IFK Norrköping	2018	Allsvenskan	8	1	0	0	—		—		—		8	1
IFK Norrköping	Total		84	6	14	0	—		5	0	0	0	103	6
IFK Mariehamn	2019	Veikkausliiga	17	0	2	0	—		—		—		19	0
FC Åland	2020	Kolmonen	3	1	0	0	—		—				3	1
FC Åland	2021	Kolmonen	7	1	0	0	—		—		3	0	10	1
FC Åland	Total		10	2	0	0	—		—		3	0	13	2
Career total			380	41	43	13	0	0	15	0	13	1	451	55

=== International goals ===
As of 17 October 2010

Goal	Date	Venue	Opponent	Score	Result	Competition	Reports
1.	12 November 2005	Olympic Stadium, Helsinki	Estonia	1–0	2–2	Friendly match	
2.	10 September 2008	Olympic Stadium, Helsinki	Germany	3–2	3–3	FIFA World Cup 2010 qualifying	

=== International ===
As of 14 November 2012

Finland national team
Year	Apps	Goals
2003	2	0
2004	2	0
2005	4	1
2006	1	0
2007	6	0
2008	3	1
2009	4	0
2010	4	0
2011	5	0
2012	6	0
Total	37	2

== Honours ==
Djurgårdens IF

- Allsvenskan: 2003, 2005
- Svenska Cupen: 2004, 2005

IFK Norrköping

- Allsvenskan: 2015

Individual

- Swedish Goal of the Year: 2005
- Årets Järnkamin: 2008
