= Tobias Hysén =

Swedish footballer

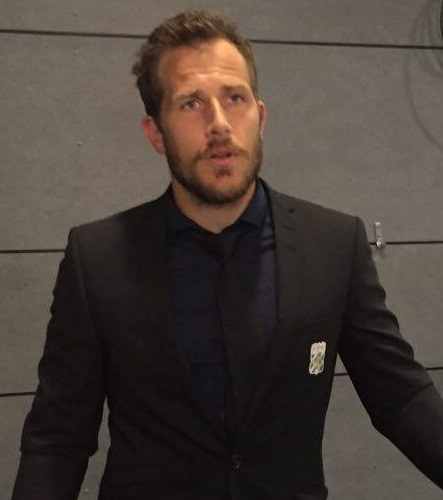
- Tobias Hysén in June 2016

Personal information
- Full name: Glenn Tobias Hysén
- Date of birth: 9 March 1982 (age 44)
- Place of birth: Gothenburg, Sweden
- Height: 1.80 m (5 ft 11 in)
- Positions: Forward; winger

Team information
- Current team: Utsiktens BK (U17 coach)

Youth career
- Ubbhults IF
- Lundby IF

Senior career*
Years	Team	Apps	(Gls)
1998	Lundby IF	2	(0)
1999–2003	BK Häcken	66	(13)
2004–2006	Djurgårdens IF	65	(17)
2006–2007	Sunderland	26	(4)
2007–2013	IFK Göteborg	172	(69)
2014–2015	Shanghai SIPG	54	(31)
2016–2018	IFK Göteborg	79	(20)
2019–2023	Kungsbacka City	44	(28)
2022–2023	→ Tvååkers IF (loan)	0	(0)
Total		508	(182)

International career
2000	Sweden U18	4	(0)
2002–2004	Sweden U21	13	(2)
2005–2014	Sweden	34	(10)
- * Club domestic league appearances and goals

Glenn Tobias Hysén (born 9 March 1982) is a Swedish former professional footballer who played as a forward or as a winger. Starting his career with Lundby IF in 1998, he went on to represent BK Häcken, Djurgårdens IF, Sunderland, IFK Göteborg, and Shanghai SIPG before retiring in 2018. A full international between 2005 and 2014, Hysén won 34 caps and scored 10 goals for the Sweden national team. He represented his country at UEFA Euro 2012.

He is the son of former professional footballer Glenn Hysén.

== Early life ==
Hysén was born to parents Kerstin, a surgical nurse, and Liverpool and IFK Göteborg player Glenn Hysén. Hysén has a sister, Charlotte who is three years younger than him. Shortly after, his parents divorced and his father remarried. He has two half-brothers, Alexander and Anton, and one half-sister, Annie.

As a child, Hysén spent his early childhood moving around due to his father's football career. Prior to his parents' divorce, Hysén lived in Gothenburg, Sweden and Eindhoven, Netherlands.

== Club career ==
=== Early career ===
The first club he played for was Ubbhult IF because his cousin played there. Hysén only played for the team between 1986 and 1988. The next club he played for was Lindholmens BK because that is where he lived at the time. In 1995, Hysén played for Lundby IF where he stood for four years.

=== BK Häcken ===
In 1999, he signed with BK Häcken where he spent a total of five seasons.

=== Djurgårdens IF ===
He joined Djurgården from BK Häcken in 2004, and signed a contract until 2008. During his time with Djurgården, he won Allsvenskan, the Swedish top division, in 2005. He is left-footed, and started off as a left-winger but, during his time in Djurgården, he would occasionally play as a striker, and since coming back home to Sweden and IFK Göteborg he has mainly been playing as a striker, though he is mostly used as a winger when playing for the national team.

=== Sunderland ===
On 23 August 2006, Tobias signed a deal to join Sunderland, for £1.7 million. Hysén had an immediate impact on his first start for the club, against West Bromwich Albion, creating the second goal, and generally impressing. Under Roy Keane, however, Hysen was often overlooked for Ross Wallace. Despite this, Hysen scored his first goal for the club in a 1–1 draw with Leicester City, at the Stadium of Light, just minutes after being brought on as a substitute. Coincidentally, he netted the opener in the Black Cats' 2–0 win at Leicester on New Year's Day 2007.

In late July 2007, it was revealed that Tobias had requested a move back to his native Sweden. He claimed that he and his girlfriend had never really settled in Sunderland.

=== IFK Göteborg ===
On 25 August 2007, Hysén completed his move to IFK Göteborg for an undisclosed fee. Thus becoming the fifth member of his family to play for the club. In 2009, he scored 18 goals, making him the top scorer of Allsvenskan alongside Brazilian player Wánderson do Carmo.

Hysén suffered a series of minor injuries through his 2010 season which prevented him from ever reaching the top of his game, though he still managed to produce 10 goals before ending the season. Tobias kept up a great scoring record as he ended the 2011 season scoring 16 goal in 29 games, making him the second best goalscorer of Allsvenskan 2011. He was succeeded by former teammate Mathias Ranégie who scored 21 goals.

Tobias Hysén have been considered to be one of the best active players in the Swedish football league. Many have been surprised by Hyséns dedication to stay with IFK Göteborg. In 2010, he turned down an offer from Belgian top club Club Brugge, and instead signed a new 4-year deal with Göteborg.

=== Shanghai SIPG ===
Hysén signed a two-year contract with Chinese Super League side Shanghai Dongya in the 2013–2014 winter transfer window. In his first season, he scored 19 goals and made 10 assists in 28 matches. In April 2015, he agreed to a contract extension of a further two years.

=== Return to IFK Göteborg and retirement ===
On 26 January 2016, Hysén announced that he would return to IFK Göteborg on a 3-year contract ahead of the 2016 Allsvenskan season. At the end of the 2018 season, Hysén retired from professional football.

== International career ==
=== Youth ===
Hysén began his international career in 2002 when he played for Sweden's U21 where he continued to play until 2004. In November 2003, Hysén had a noticeably spectacular performance against Spain in a U-21 qualification game. Sweden landed a 3–1 victory against Spain which consequently placed them in the U21 Championships in Germany in 2004. He was part of the Sweden U21 team that finished fourth at the 2004 UEFA European Under-21 Championship.

=== Senior ===
In January 2005, he made his international debut in a friendly against South Korea.

Hysén got a sudden call-up for Sweden's 2010 FIFA World Cup qualification game against Malta, due to the recent death of the brother of Henrik Larsson, for which Larsson got permission to leave the squad. He was later called up for a few exhibition games with the national team, but was often overlooked for Marcus Berg and/or Alexander Gerndt when it came to more important games, mainly due to the fact that they played on a higher level in their club teams.

As of 2011, and in the UEFA Euro 2012 qualifying games, Hysén was called up regularly by the new national team coach Erik Hamrén, having played 7 games and scored 6 goals. Hysén represented Sweden at Euro 2012.

On 15 October 2013, he scored two goals in a 2014 FIFA World Cup qualifier 3–5 loss against Germany.

He made his last and 34th international appearance in a friendly against Estonia on 4 September 2014.

== Personal life ==
Hysén is the son of the former IFK Göteborg, PSV Eindhoven, Fiorentina, and Liverpool defender Glenn Hysén. He and his longtime girlfriend Maria Kaspersson reside in Göteborg with their son Lucas, who was born on 20 January 2008. He is also a member of the Långaryd family, the largest documented family by Guinness Book of Records. In 2009, Tobias along with his father and two brothers blogged for the Aftonbladet, primarily about football. In March 2011, Hysén's younger brother Anton came out openly as gay, and Hysén stated that he supported his brother and hoped more players would come forth. He is the great-grandson of Erik Hysén.

== Career statistics ==
=== Club ===
Appearances and goals by club, season and competition
Club	Season	League			Cup		Europe		Other		Total	
Club	Season	Division	Apps	Goals	Apps	Goals	Apps	Goals	Apps	Goals	Apps	Goals
Lundby IF	1998	Division 1 Södra	2	0			—				2	0
Lundby IF	Total		2	0	0	0	0	0	0	0	2	0
BK Häcken	1999	Division 1 Södra	0	0			—				0	0
BK Häcken	2000	Allsvenskan	1	0			—				1	0
BK Häcken	2001	Allsvenskan	13	1			—				13	1
BK Häcken	2002	Superettan	25	7			—				25	7
BK Häcken	2003	Superettan	27	5			—				27	5
BK Häcken	Total		66	13	0	0	0	0	0	0	66	13
Djurgården	2004	Allsvenskan	25	3	6	2	6	3	3	2	40	10
Djurgården	2005	Allsvenskan	25	9	5	2	2	0	6	2	38	13
Djurgården	2006	Allsvenskan	15	5	3	2	2	0	6	4	26	11
Djurgården	Total		65	17	14	6	10	3	15	8	104	34
Sunderland	2006–07	Championship	26	4	1	0	—				27	4
Sunderland	Total		26	4	1	0	0	0	0	0	27	4
IFK Göteborg	2007	Allsvenskan	6	1							6	1
IFK Göteborg	2008	Allsvenskan	30	4			4	0	1	0	35	4
IFK Göteborg	2009	Allsvenskan	27	18	4	3	2	1	1	0	34	22
IFK Göteborg	2010	Allsvenskan	22	10	1	1	2	0	1	0	26	11
IFK Göteborg	2011	Allsvenskan	29	16	3	3					32	19
IFK Göteborg	2012	Allsvenskan	30	6	1	0					31	6
IFK Göteborg	2013	Allsvenskan	28	14	7	8	2	0			37	22
IFK Göteborg	Total		172	69	16	15	10	1	3	0	201	85
Shanghai SIPG	2014	Chinese Super League	28	19	0	0	—		—		28	19
Shanghai SIPG	2015	Chinese Super League	26	12	1	0	—		—		27	12
Shanghai SIPG	Total		54	31	1	0	—		—		55	31
IFK Göteborg	2016	Allsvenskan	28	10	3	1	7	3	—		38	14
IFK Göteborg	2017	Allsvenskan	30	9	5	0	—		—		35	9
IFK Göteborg	2018	Allsvenskan	21	1	4	0	—		—		24	1
IFK Göteborg	Total		79	20	12	1	7	3	—		98	24
Career total			464	154	44	22	27	7	18	8	553	191

=== International ===
Appearances and goals by national team and year

National team	Year	Apps	Goals
Sweden	2005	3	0
Sweden	2006	2	0
Sweden	2007	0	0
Sweden	2008	0	0
Sweden	2009	5	0
Sweden	2010	2	0
Sweden	2011	6	4
Sweden	2012	5	3
Sweden	2013	8	3
Sweden	2014	3	0
Total		34	10

International goals

Scores and results list Sweden's goal tally first.

#	Date	Venue	Opponent	Score	Result	Competition
1.	22 January 2011	Mbombela Stadium, Nelspruit, South Africa	South Africa	1–1	1–1	Friendly
2.	8 February 2011	GSP Stadium, Nicosia, Cyprus	Cyprus	1–0	2–0	Cyprus International Football Tournament
3.	10 August 2011	Metalist Stadium, Kharkiv, Ukraine	Ukraine	1–0	1–0	Friendly
4.	6 September 2011	Stadio Olimpico, Serravalle, San Marino	San Marino	5–0	5–0	UEFA Euro 2012 qualifying
5.	18 January 2012	Al-Gharafa Stadium, Doha, Qatar	Bahrain	1–0	2–0	Friendly
6.	23 January 2012	Jassim Bin Hamad Stadium, Doha, Qatar	Qatar	3–0	5–0	Friendly
7.	23 January 2012	Jassim Bin Hamad Stadium, Doha, Qatar	Qatar	5–0	5–0	Friendly
8.	26 January 2013	700th Anniversary Stadium, Chiang Mai, Thailand	Finland	1–0	3–0	2013 King's Cup
9.	15 October 2013	Friends Arena, Stockholm, Sweden	Germany	1–0	3–5	2014 FIFA World Cup qualifier
10.	15 October 2013	Friends Arena, Stockholm, Sweden	Germany	3–4	3–5	2014 FIFA World Cup qualifier

== Honours ==
Djurgården

- Allsvenskan: 2005
- Svenska Cupen: 2004, 2005

Sunderland

- Football League Championship: 2006–07

IFK Göteborg

- Allsvenskan: 2007
- Svenska Cupen: 2008, 2012–13

Individual

- Årets Järnkamin: 2004
- Swedish Newcomer of the Year: 2004
- Allsvenskan Player of the Season: 2009, 2013
- Allsvenskan top scorer: 2009 (shared with Wánderson)
- Allsvenskan Forward of the Season: 2013
- Årets Ärkeängel: 2009
