= Juraj Dovičovič =

Slovak footballer

Personal information
- Date of birth: 27 May 1980 (age 46)
- Place of birth: Nitra, Czechoslovakia
- Height: 1.82 m (6 ft 0 in)
- Position: Attacking midfielder

Youth career
- Nitra

Senior career*
Years	Team	Apps	(Gls)
1998–2000	Nitra	31	(3)
2000–2002	Lokomotiv Moscow	2	(0)
2000–2002	Lokomotiv Moscow II	32	(7)
2002–2004	Dubnica	50	(15)
2004	Djurgårdens IF	8	(1)
2005–2006	Dubnica	28	(4)
2006	Ružomberok	26	(3)
2007	ZTE	5	(1)
2007–2008	Ružomberok	4	(0)
2007–2008	Ružomberok II		
2009	SV Absdorf		
2009–2010	Palárikovo		

International career
2000–2001	Slovakia U21	4	(1)
2004	Slovakia	2	(0)
- * Club domestic league appearances and goals

Juraj Dovičovič (born 27 May 1980) is a Slovak former footballer who played as a midfielder. He represented the Slovakia football team in a two international friendly matches against Ukraine team on 28 April 2004 and then against Croatia a month and one day later.

== Honours ==
Djurgårdens IF

- Svenska Cupen: 2004
