= Johan Arneng =

Swedish footballer

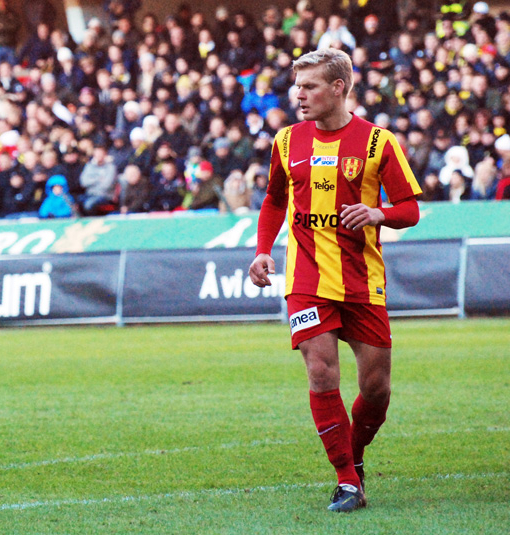
- Johan Arneng playing for Syrianska

Personal information
- Full name: Bo Johan Peter Arneng
- Date of birth: 14 June 1979 (age 47)
- Place of birth: Uddevalla, Sweden
- Height: 1.75 m (5 ft 9 in)
- Position: Midfielder

Youth career
- Svane IF
- –1995: IFK Sunne
- 1995–1998: Degerfors IF
- 1998–1999: Empoli FC

Senior career*
Years	Team	Apps	(Gls)
1999–2001	Raufoss IL	59	(21)
2002	Vålerenga	29	(4)
2003–2007	Djurgårdens IF	113	(9)
2008–2011	Aalesund	73	(4)
2011–2012	Syrianska	41	(0)
2013–2014	IK Sirius	50	(5)
Total		365	(43)

International career^{‡}
1997	Sweden U19	3	(0)
2004–2005	Sweden	2	(0)
- * Club domestic league appearances and goals as of 23 November 2013 ‡ National team caps and goals as of 2 December 2007

Bo Johan Peter Arneng (born 14 June 1979) is a Swedish former professional footballer who played as a midfielder. He won two Allsvenskan titles, two Svenska Cupen titles, and two Norwegian Football Cup titles during a career that spanned between 1999 and 2014. A full international between 2004 and 2005, he won two caps for the Sweden national team.

== Club career ==
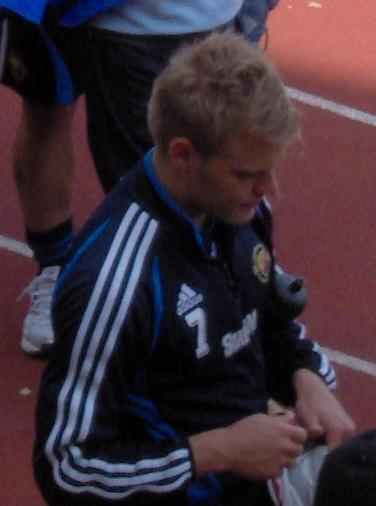
Arneng while playing for Djurgårdens IF.

After a spell with Empoli FC's youth organization, Arneng began his senior career with Raufoss IL in the Norwegian Second Division. He signed with Vålerenga in 2002, and helped the team win the 2002 Norwegian Football Cup. After only one season in the Norwegian Premier Division, Arneng signed with Allsvenskan side Djurgårdens IF in 2003. While with Djurgårdens IF, he would go on and win the 2003 and 2005 Allsvenskan titles, as well as the 2004 and 2005 Svenska Cupen titles. In 2008, he left Sweden to yet again play in Norway, this time for Aalesund with which he ended up winning the 2009 Norwegian Football Cup. After three years in Norway, Arneng rounded off his career with stints with Syrianska and IK Sirius before retiring in 2014.

== International career ==
Arneng featured three times for the Sweden U19 team in 1997. He made his full international debut for the Sweden national team on 22 January 2004, playing for 90 minutes in a friendly 0–3 loss against Norway. He won his second and final cap on 17 August 2005, replacing Henrik Larsson in the 84th minute of a friendly 2–1 win against the Czech Republic.

== Career statistics ==
=== International ===
Appearances and goals by national team and year
National team	Year	Apps	Goals
Sweden	2004	1	0
Sweden	2005	1	0
Total		2	0

== Honours ==
Vålerenga

- Norwegian Football Cup: 2002

Djurgårdens IF

- Allsvenskan: 2003, 2005
- Svenska Cupen: 2004, 2005

Aalesund

- Norwegian Football Cup: 2009

Individual

- Swedish Newcomer of the Year: 2003
- Årets Järnkamin: 2005
