= Fredrik Stenman =

Swedish footballer

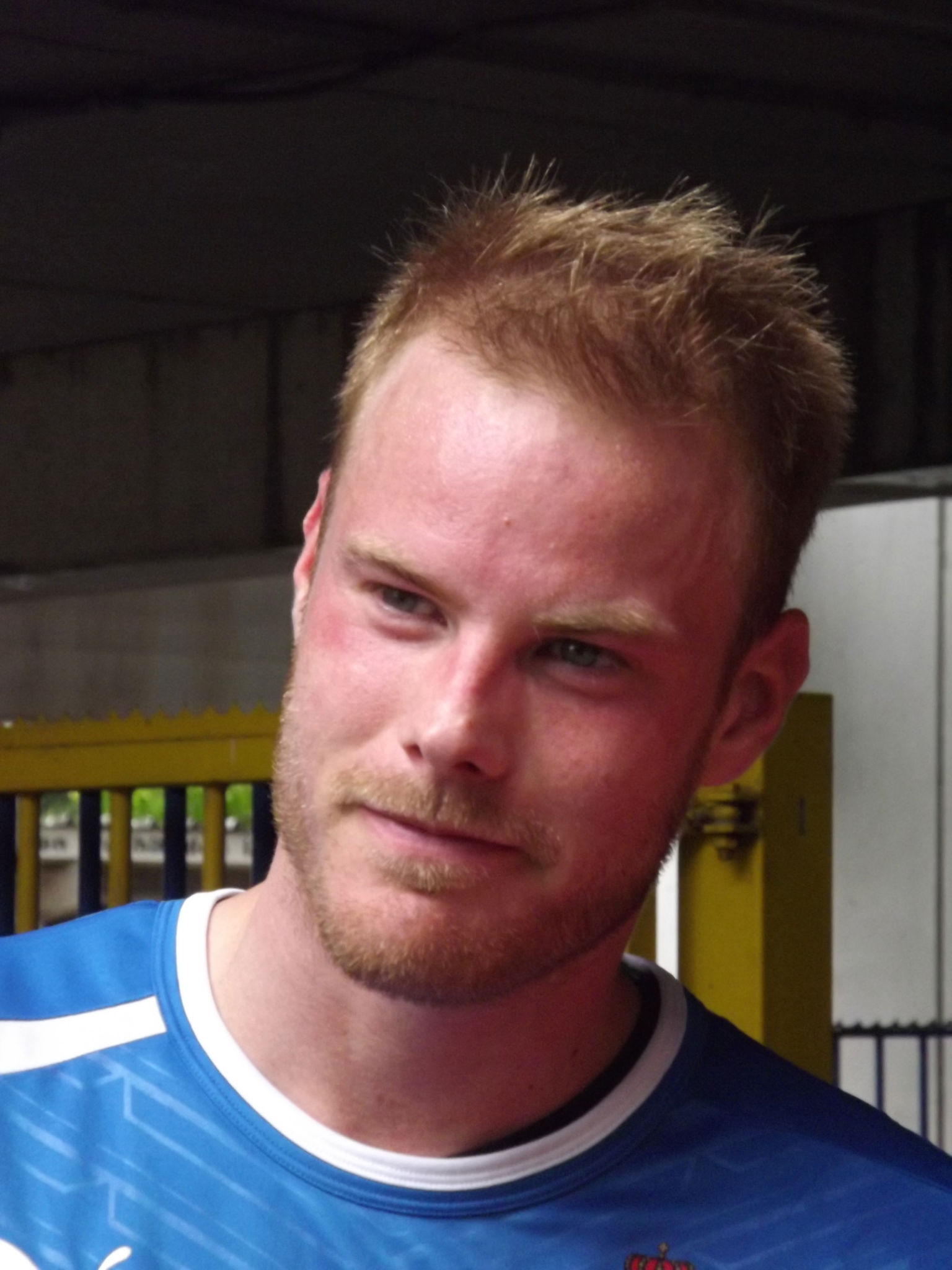
- Stenman in 2012

Personal information
- Full name: Erik Karl-Fredrik Stenman
- Date of birth: 2 June 1983 (age 43)
- Place of birth: Munktorp, Sweden
- Height: 1.87 m (6 ft 2 in)
- Position: Defender

Youth career
- –1999: Munktorps BK
- 1999–2000: Västerås SK

Senior career*
Years	Team	Apps	(Gls)
2000–2001	Västerås SK	28	(3)
2002–2003	IF Elfsborg	36	(0)
2003–2005	Djurgårdens IF	63	(8)
2006–2007	Bayer Leverkusen	28	(0)
2006–2007	Bayer Leverkusen II	3	(1)
2007–2011	FC Groningen	118	(4)
2011–2014	Club Brugge	20	(0)
2014–2015	Djurgårdens IF	19	(0)
2016–2019	IFK Lidingö	15	(4)
Total		330	(20)

International career
2001	Sweden U19	7	(0)
2003–2005	Sweden U21	26	(1)
2006–2011	Sweden	3	(0)
- * Club domestic league appearances and goals

Erik Karl-Fredrik Stenman (IPA: [ˈfrěːdrɪk ˈstěːnman]; born 2 June 1983) is a Swedish former professional footballer who played as a defender. Starting off his career in the early 2000s with Västerås SK, he went on to play professionally in Sweden, Germany, the Netherlands, and Belgium before ending his professional career with Djurgårdens IF in 2015. A full international between 2006 and 2011, he won three caps for the Sweden national team and was a squad member for Sweden at the 2006 FIFA World Cup.

== Club career ==
Stenman was born in Munktorp, and began his professional career with Västerås SK in 1999. He would go on to make his Allsvenskan debut for IF Elfsborg in 2002, and then signed for Djurgårdens IF in the summer of 2003. While at Djurgården, he helped the team win the 2003 and 2005 Allsvenskan, as well as the 2004 and 2005 Svenska Cupen.

On 1 January 2006, Stenman joined the Bundesliga club Bayer Leverkusen for a transfer fee of 8 million SEK, and played in 28 Bundesliga games before leaving Germany to sign for the Eredivisie club FC Groningen in the summer of 2007. In the summer of 2011, he signed for Club Brugge in the Belgian First Division A, and played in 20 games until 2014 when he returned to Djurgårdens IF for a second stint. Stenman struggled for playing time at Djurgården and ended his professional career in 2015 to play for the Division 3 Östra Svealand team IFK Lidingö. In 2019, Stenman made a brief comeback and represented the club in a game in Division 2 Norra Svealand.

== International career ==
Stenman won three caps for the Sweden national team between 2006 and 2011. He was named in the Sweden squad for the 2006 FIFA World Cup and served as a back-up left back behind Erik Edman.

== Career statistics ==
=== International ===
Appearances and goals by national team and year
National team	Year	Apps	Goals
Sweden	2006	2	0
Sweden	2007	0	0
Sweden	2008	0	0
Sweden	2009	0	0
Sweden	2010	0	0
Sweden	2011	1	0
Total		3	0

== Honours ==
Djurgårdens IF

- Allsvenskan: 2003, 2005
- Svenska Cupen: 2004, 2005

IFK Lidingö

- Division 3 Östra Svealand: 2016
