= Mattias Jonson =

Swedish footballer (born 1974)

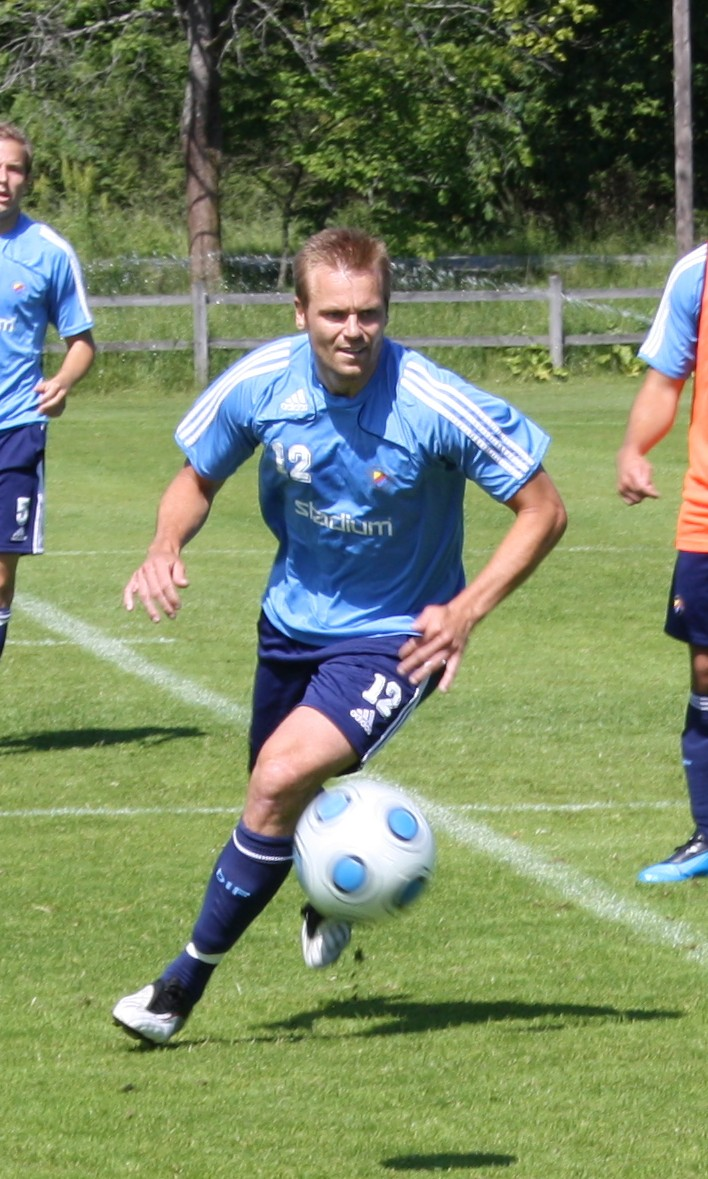

Personal information
- Full name: Olof Mattias Jonsson
- Date of birth: 16 January 1974 (age 52)
- Place of birth: Kumla, Sweden
- Position: Winger

Senior career*
| Years | Team | Apps | (Gls) |
| 1992–1995 | Örebro SK | 61 | (24) |
| 1996–1999 | Helsingborgs IF | 84 | (23) |
| 1999–2004 | Brøndby | 131 | (40) |
| 2004–2005 | Norwich City | 28 | (0) |
| 2005–2011 | Djurgårdens IF | 104 | (22) |
| Total | | 408 | (109) |

International career
| 1994–1995 | Sweden U21 | 15 | (6) |
| 1995 | Sweden B | 1 | (0) |
| 1996–2006 | Sweden | 57 | (9) |
- * Club domestic league appearances and goals

Olof Mattias Jonsson (pronounced [maˈtîːas ˈjʊ̌nːsɔn]; born 16 January 1974) is a Swedish former professional footballer who played as a winger. Starting off his career with Örebro SK in the early 1990s, he went on to represent Helsingborgs IF, Brøndby IF, and Norwich City before retiring at Djurgårdens IF in 2011. A full international between 1996 and 2006, he won 57 caps and scored nine goals for the Sweden national team. He represented his country at the 2002 FIFA World Cup, UEFA Euro 2004, and the 2006 FIFA World Cup.

== Club career ==
=== Early career ===
Born in Kumla, Jonson started playing youth football with IFK Kumla and Karlslunds IF. He moved to Örebro SK in 1992, where he got his senior debut in the top-flight Allsvenskan championship. He moved to league rivals Helsingborgs IF in 1996. He won the 1999 Allsvenskan championship with Helsingborg, before leaving the club at the end of the 1999 season.

=== Brøndby IF ===
Jonson moved abroad to join Danish club Brøndby IF in the Danish Superliga championship. He was brought in by Brøndby's new manager Åge Hareide, and Jonson played several games as a striker, before settling as a left-sided winger. He showed his goalscoring abilities for Brøndby on a number of occasions. In the 2001–02 UEFA Cup tournament, Brøndby had lost 3–1 away to Croatian club NK Varteks. In the return game, Jonson scored a hat-trick which guided Brøndby to a 5–0 victory and advancement in the tournament, on a 6–3 aggregate. Jonson also scored a hat-trick in an April 2002 Superliga game, when Brøndby won 5–0 against Akademisk Boldklub, and helped the club win the 2001–02 Superliga championship.

He was Brøndby's league topscorer with 11 goals in the 2002–03 Superliga season, and helped the club win the 2003 Danish Cup trophy.

=== Norwich City ===
After the 2004 European Championship, Jonson looked to leave Brøndby. In August 2004, he moved to England and joined the newly promoted Premier League side Norwich City. He transferred from Brøndby for an undisclosed fee, which was believed to be around £850,000. He struggled to make an impact in the Premier League, and left Norwich after one season.

=== Return to Sweden ===
In 2005, he returned to Sweden to play for Djurgårdens IF. In his first season with the club, he helped Djurgårdens IF win the Double of both the 2005 Allsvenskan and Svenska Cupen trophies. He started the tournament as a substitute, but was included in Sweden's starting line-up for the final two games before elimination. He ended his national team career in August 2006. Jonson ended his career after the 2011 season, and played his last game on 23 October 2011.

== International career ==
Jonson made his Sweden national team debut in February 1996. He was included in the Sweden national team for the 2002 World Cup, where he took part in two games as a substitute, before Sweden were eliminated.

He was called up in the Sweden national team for the 2004 European Championship. He started the tournament on the bench, but was brought on as a substitute and eventually secured himself a place in the starting line-up. He played in three of Sweden's four games, and scored a goal against Denmark, which secured Sweden advancement from the preliminary group stage.

He represented Sweden at the 2006 World Cup, where he took part in all Sweden's four matches.

== Personal life ==
He is the father of the Djurgårdens IF player Melker Jonsson.

== Career statistics ==
=== Club ===
Appearances and goals by club, season and competition
| Club | Season | League | | | National Cup | | League Cup | | Continental | | Other | | Total | |
| Club | Season | Division | Apps | Goals | Apps | Goals | Apps | Goals | Apps | Goals | Apps | Goals | Apps | Goals |
|---|---|---|---|---|---|---|---|---|---|---|---|---|---|---|
| Örebro | 1993 | Allsvenskan | 15 | 1 | | | – | | | | – | | | |
| Örebro | 1994 | Allsvenskan | 26 | 14 | | | – | | | | – | | | |
| Örebro | 1995 | Allsvenskan | 20 | 9 | | | – | | | | – | | | |
| Örebro | Total | | 61 | 24 | | | 0 | 0 | | | 0 | 0 | | |
| Helsingborg | 1996 | Allsvenskan | 21 | 3 | | | – | | | | – | | | |
| Helsingborg | 1997 | Allsvenskan | 19 | 11 | | | – | | | | – | | | |
| Helsingborg | 1998 | Allsvenskan | 20 | 4 | | | – | | | | – | | | |
| Helsingborg | 1999 | Allsvenskan | 24 | 5 | | | – | | | | – | | | |
| Helsingborg | Total | | 84 | 23 | | | 0 | 0 | | | 0 | 0 | | |
| Brøndby | 1999-00 | Superliga | 15 | 2 | 0 | 0 | – | | 0 | 0 | – | | 15 | 2 |
| Brøndby | 2000–01 | Superliga | 29 | 14 | 2 | 0 | – | | 5 | 1 | – | | 36 | 15 |
| Brøndby | 2001–02 | Superliga | 30 | 7 | 1 | 0 | – | | 7 | 4 | – | | 38 | 11 |
| Brøndby | 2002–03 | Superliga | 29 | 11 | 5 | 3 | – | | 6 | 2 | – | | 40 | 16 |
| Brøndby | 2003–04 | Superliga | 26 | 6 | 2 | 0 | – | | 8 | 3 | – | | 36 | 9 |
| Brøndby | 2004–05 | Superliga | 2 | 0 | 0 | 0 | – | | 0 | 0 | – | | 2 | 0 |
| Brøndby | Total | | 131 | 40 | 10 | 3 | 0 | 0 | 26 | 10 | 0 | 0 | 167 | 53 |
| Norwich City | 2004–05 | Premier League | 28 | 0 | 1 | 0 | 1 | 0 | – | | – | | 30 | 0 |
| Djurgården | 2005 | Allsvenskan | 10 | 4 | 2 | 0 | – | | 2 | 0 | – | | 14 | 4 |
| Djurgården | 2006 | Allsvenskan | 21 | 6 | | | – | | 2 | 0 | – | | 23 | 6 |
| Djurgården | 2007 | Allsvenskan | 16 | 5 | | | – | | – | | – | | 16 | 5 |
| Djurgården | 2008 | Allsvenskan | 12 | 2 | | | – | | 0 | 0 | – | | 12 | 2 |
| Djurgården | 2009 | Allsvenskan | 8 | 1 | | | – | | 0 | 0 | 1 (Note: One appearance in Allsvenskan relegation playoff) | 1 | 9 | 2 |
| Djurgården | 2010 | Allsvenskan | 14 | 2 | | | – | | 0 | 0 | – | | 14 | 2 |
| Djurgården | 2011 | Allsvenskan | 22 | 2 | | | – | | 0 | 0 | – | | 22 | 2 |
| Djurgården | Total | | 103 | 22 | 2 | 0 | 0 | 0 | 4 | 0 | 1 | 1 | 110 | 23 |
| Career total | | | 362 | 103 | | | 1 | 0 | | | 1 | 1 | | |

=== International ===
Appearances and goals by national team and year
| National team | Year | Apps | Goals |
|---|---|---|---|
| Sweden | 1996 | 2 | 0 |
| Sweden | 1997 | 3 | 1 |
| Sweden | 1998 | 2 | 0 |
| Sweden | 1999 | 4 | 0 |
| Sweden | 2000 | 6 | 0 |
| Sweden | 2001 | 5 | 1 |
| Sweden | 2002 | 6 | 0 |
| Sweden | 2003 | 8 | 4 |
| Sweden | 2004 | 8 | 2 |
| Sweden | 2005 | 5 | 1 |
| Sweden | 2006 | 8 | 0 |
| Total | | 57 | 9 |

Scores and results list Sweden's goal tally first, score column indicates score after each Jonson goal.

List of international goals scored by Mattias Jonson
| No. | Date | Venue | Opponent | Score | Result | Competition | Ref. |
|---|---|---|---|---|---|---|---|
| 1 | 10 September 1997 | Råsunda, Solna, Sweden | Latvia | 1–0 | 1–0 | 1998 FIFA World Cup qualification | |
| 2 | 12 February 2001 | Suphachalasai Stadium, Bangkok, Thailand | China | 1–0 | 3–0 | 2001 King's Cup | |
| 3 | 7 June 2003 | Stadio Olimpico, Serravalle, San Marino | San Marino | 1–0 | 6–0 | UEFA Euro 2004 qualification | |
| 4 | 7 June 2003 | Stadio Olimpico, Serravalle, San Marino | San Marino | 4–0 | 6–0 | UEFA Euro 2004 qualification | |
| 5 | 7 June 2003 | Stadio Olimpico, Serravalle, San Marino | San Marino | 5–0 | 6–0 | UEFA Euro 2004 qualification | |
| 6 | 6 September 2003 | Ullevi, Gothenburg, Sweden | San Marino | 1–0 | 5–0 | UEFA Euro 2004 qualification | |
| 7 | 22 June 2004 | Estádio do Bessa, Porto, Portugal | Denmark | 2–2 | 2–2 | UEFA Euro 2004 | |
| 8 | 18 August 2004 | Råsunda, Solna, Sweden | Netherlands | 1–0 | 2–2 | Friendly | |
| 9 | 4 June 2005 | Ullevi, Gothenburg, Sweden | Malta | 1–0 | 6–0 | 2006 FIFA World Cup qualification | |

== Honours ==
Helsingborgs IF

- Allsvenskan: 1999

Brøndby IF

- Danish Superliga: 2001–02
- Danish Cup: 2002–03

Djurgårdens IF

- Allsvenskan: 2005
- Svenska Cupen: 2005

Individual

- Stor Grabb: 2001
- Årets Järnkamin: 2011
