= Kári Árnason =

Icelandic footballer (born 1982)

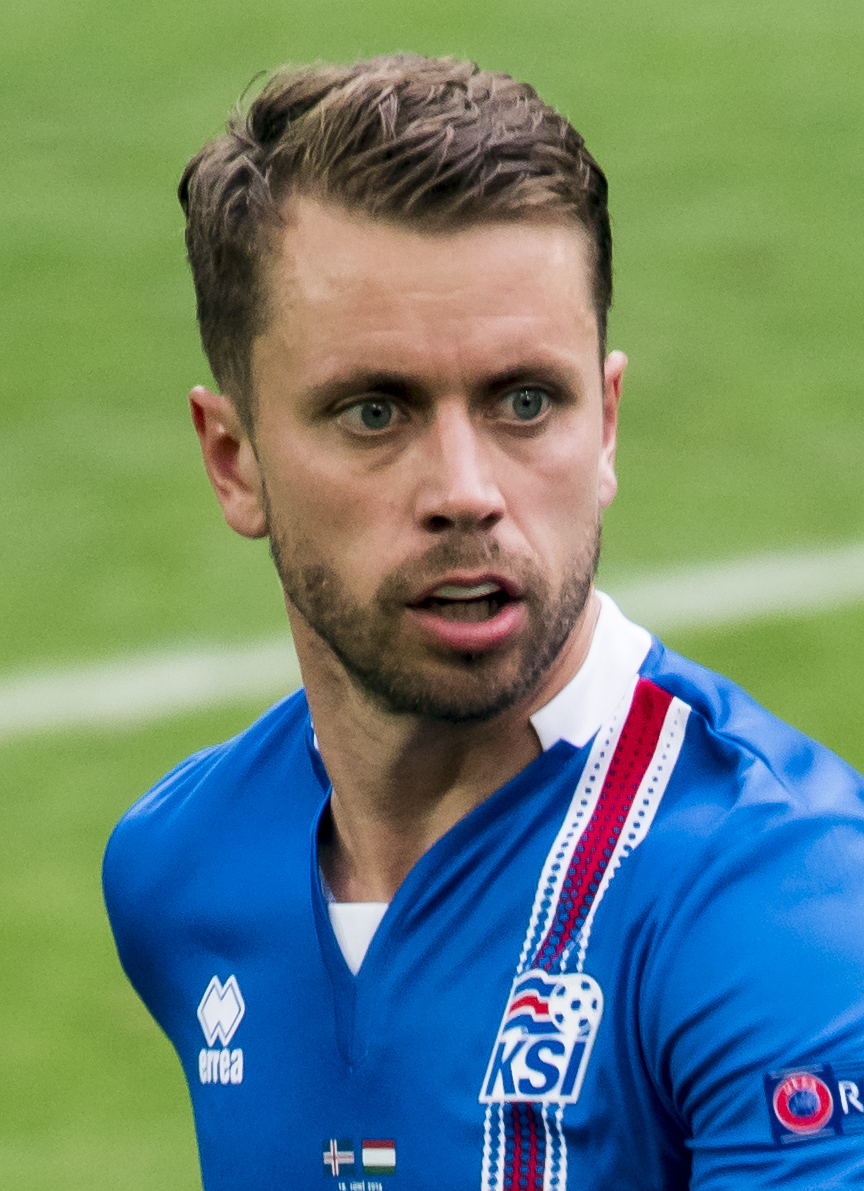
- Kári playing for Iceland against Hungary in UEFA Euro 2016

Personal information
- Full name: Kári Árnason
- Date of birth: 13 October 1982 (age 44)
- Place of birth: Gothenburg, Sweden
- Height: 1.90 m (6 ft 3 in)
- Position: Centre-back

Youth career
- 1999–2001: Víkingur

College career
Years	Team	Apps	(Gls)
2002–2003	Gonzaga Bulldogs	25	(8)
2004	Adelphi Panthers	5	(0)

Senior career*
Years	Team	Apps	(Gls)
2001–2004	Víkingur	41	(3)
2004–2006	Djurgården	35	(0)
2006–2009	AGF Aarhus	51	(3)
2009	→ Esbjerg fB (loan)	8	(0)
2009–2011	Plymouth Argyle	72	(3)
2011–2012	Aberdeen	33	(3)
2012–2015	Rotherham United	116	(5)
2015–2017	Malmö FF	37	(2)
2017	Omonia	8	(2)
2017–2018	Aberdeen	21	(3)
2018–2019	Gençlerbirliği	13	(0)
2019–2021	Víkingur	41	(2)
Total		476	(26)

International career
2005–2021	Iceland	90	(6)
- * Club domestic league appearances and goals

Kári Árnason (born 13 October 1982) is a former professional footballer who played as a centre-back. He has played for Djurgården, AGF Aarhus, Esbjerg fB, Plymouth Argyle, Aberdeen (two spells), Rotherham United, Malmö FF, Omonia and Gençlerbirliği. Capable of playing in midfield or defence. Born in Sweden, has represented Iceland at senior level since 2005, making 90 appearances and scoring 6 goals in the process. He represented Iceland at UEFA Euro 2016 and at the 2018 FIFA World Cup.

== Club career ==
=== Early years ===
Born in Gothenburg, Kári began his career as a youngster in 1999 with Víkingur at his home town of Reykjavík, where he spent the first five years in his career. Kári also played for the Gonzaga University Bulldogs in Spokane, Washington from 2002 to 2003. He brought a different style of football to Spokane, the likes of which Bulldog legends Steve Owens and Trevor Conrad had never seen. During a candid interview with Gonzaga Bulletin reporter Ryan McAteer he did admit "Americans though, are in much better shape and can run forever." He also played one season for Adelphi University in 2004. After putting together a string of impressive performances in midfield with Víkingur at an early age in the 2004 season, Kári was signed by Swedish Allsvenskan club Djurgårdens IF in 2004, where he won the Swedish league and cup double in 2005. He was signed by Danish club AGF Aarhus in 2007 and spent two years with the club, along with a spell on loan at fellow Superliga club Esbjerg fB.

=== Plymouth Argyle ===
Kári had a trial at English Football League Championship side Plymouth Argyle in the summer of 2009, and after impressing in a couple of friendly matches he signed a one-year contract with the club. He made his debut in August 2009 against Derby County and established himself as a first-team regular at the heart of the club's defence. He scored his first goal for the club against Reading on 28 December 2009 at Home Park, to become the 500th player to score a league goal since the club became professional in 1903. Kári signed a two-year contract extension in January 2010, after a string of consistent performances, to keep him at the club until the summer of 2012.

=== Aberdeen ===
Kári joined Heart of Midlothian on trial during their pre-season trip to Italy in June 2011, having been released by Plymouth's administrator after refusing to defer his wages for June. He was not offered a contract by Hearts and then began a trial with fellow Scottish Premier League club Aberdeen. He signed for Aberdeen on 18 July and received international clearance four days later. He made his debut in a 0–0 draw against St Johnstone on 23 July and scored his first goal for Aberdeen on 15 October, the opener in a 3–1 win against Dundee United. In the return New Firm fixture on 2 January 2012, Kári scored the winning goal from 35-yards at Tannadice. He was offered a new contract in December to extend his stay with the club beyond the 2011–12 season.

His goal against Rangers in a 1–1 draw at Ibrox Stadium took his tally for the campaign to three. Kári rejected Aberdeen's offer of a new contract towards the end of January and manager Craig Brown said that he expected him to leave in the summer. "We made Kári an exceptionally good offer. However, the player believes he can earn a better deal elsewhere," said an Aberdeen spokesperson.

=== Rotherham United ===
Kári Árnason joined Rotherham United in June 2012. He played over 100 games for the club, where he earned back-to-back promotions from League Two to the Championship. He played the majority of the games in defense, the others in midfield.

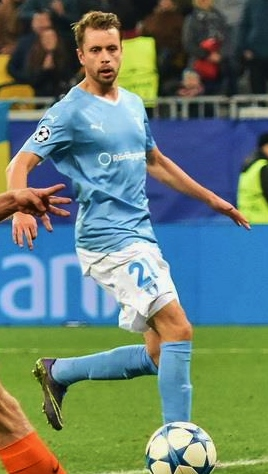
Kári playing for Malmö FF.

=== Malmö FF ===
On 29 June 2015, Kári returned to his country of birth, signing a two-and-a-half-year contract with Malmö FF. Malmö FF sold their two starting centre-backs in the same transfer window, and he formed a new centre-back pairing with Rasmus Bengtsson. The team continued to struggle in their league campaign, but qualified for the 2015–16 UEFA Champions League group stage. In a team with many newly signed players, Kári had quickly become a leader and was appointed vice-captain by Åge Hareide. The team was able to get back to its winning ways during the 2016 season. With captain Markus Rosenberg injured, Kári wore the armband during the final title run and led the team to secure the Allsvenskan title with two games to play.

=== AC Omonia ===
On 30 January 2017, Kári joined AC Omonia. He had 8 appearances with the club. He was given a transfer to Aberdeen after expressing his wish for the transfer and an agreement based on the demands of Omonia Nicosia.

=== Return to Aberdeen ===
On 14 July 2017, Kári rejoined Aberdeen, for whom he had played in the 2011–12 season. He was released by Aberdeen in May 2018, at the end of his contract.

=== Gençlerbirliği ===
On 24 July 2018, Kári agreed terms with Turkish First League side Gençlerbirliği, signing a one-year deal.

=== Return to Víkingur ===
At the end of his contract at Gençlerbirliği, Kári rejoined the club he played for as a youth, Víkingur, signing a two-year deal until the end of the 2020 season.

== International career ==
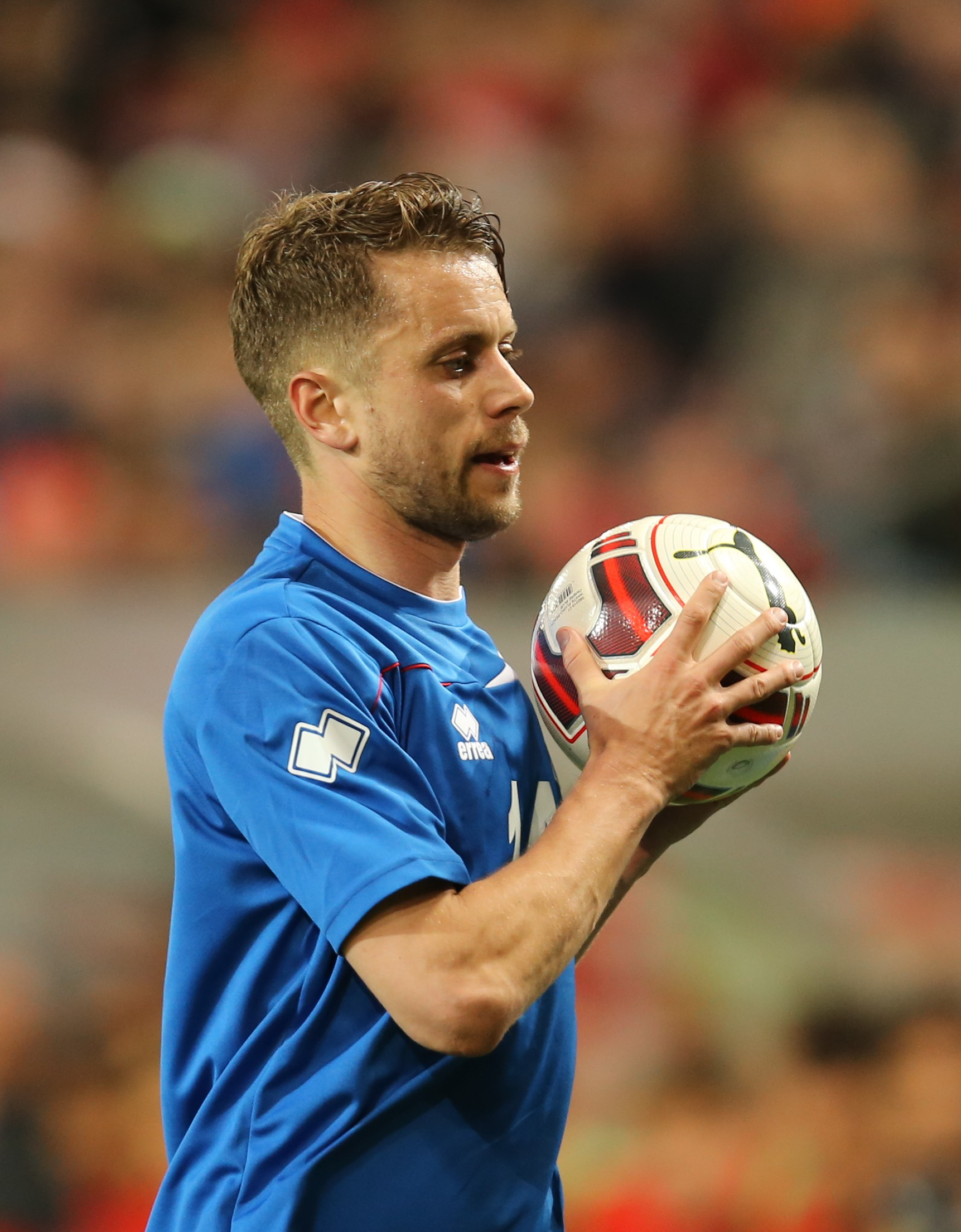
Kári playing for Iceland

Kári Árnason was called up to the senior Iceland squad in March 2005 for the game against Croatia and he made his debut four days later against Italy. He scored his first goal for his country seven months later in October 2005 against Sweden at Råsunda.

He was selected by Lars Lagerbäck for UEFA Euro 2016 where Iceland made their first ever appearance in a major tournament. In the first game he marked Cristiano Ronaldo out of the game in their draw with Portugal, the team that eventually won the entire tournament. In their last group stage game Iceland were able to beat Austria to advance to the knock-out stages, and he notched an assist and was selected as man of the match. He once again assisted a goal in Iceland's upset victory over England in the round of 16.

In May 2018 he was named in Iceland's 23-man squad for the 2018 World Cup in Russia.

== Career statistics ==
Appearances and goals by national team and year
National team	Year	Apps	Goals
Iceland
Iceland	2005	8	1
Iceland	2006	4	0
Iceland	2007	4	0
Iceland	2008	0	0
Iceland	2009	0	0
Iceland	2010	1	0
Iceland	2011	0	0
Iceland	2012	7	1
Iceland	2013	8	0
Iceland	2014	6	0
Iceland	2015	7	0
Iceland	2016	11	1
Iceland	2017	8	1
Iceland	2018	9	2
Iceland	2019	8	0
Iceland	2020	6	0
Iceland	2021	3	0
Total		90	6

Scores and results list Iceland's goal tally first, score column indicates score after each Kári goal.

List of international goals scored by Kári Árnason
No.	Date	Venue	Cap	Opponent	Score	Result	Competition
1	12 October 2005	Råsunda Stadium, Solna, Sweden	8	Sweden	1–0	1–3	2006 FIFA World Cup qualification
2	7 September 2012	Laugardalsvöllur, Reykjavík, Iceland	22	Norway	1–0	2–0	2014 FIFA World Cup qualification
3	6 October 2016	Laugardalsvöllur, Reykjavík, Iceland	54	Finland	1–1	3–2	2018 FIFA World Cup qualification
4	6 October 2017	New Eskişehir Stadium, Eskişehir, Turkey	62	Turkey	3–0	3–0	2018 FIFA World Cup qualification
5	7 June 2018	Laugardalsvöllur, Reykjavík, Iceland	67	Ghana	1–0	2–2	Friendly
6	11 October 2018	Stade de Roudourou, Guingamp, France	70	France	2–0	2–2	Friendly

== Honours ==
Víkingur FC

- Icelandic Cup: 2019, 2021
- Icelandic Premier Division: 2021

Malmö FF

- Allsvenskan: 2016

Rotherham United

- Football League One play-offs: 2014
- Football League Two runner-up: 2012–13

Djurgården

- Allsvenskan: 2005
- Svenska Cupen: 2005
