= Søren Larsen =

Danish footballer (born 1981)

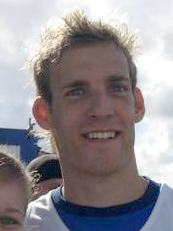
- Larsen with Schalke 04

Personal information
- Full name: Søren Larsen
- Date of birth: 6 September 1981 (age 45)
- Place of birth: Køge, Denmark
- Height: 1.93 m (6 ft 4 in)
- Position: Striker

Senior career*
Years	Team	Apps	(Gls)
1997–2001	Køge BK	39	(12)
2001–2004	Brøndby	1	(0)
2002–2003	→ Frem (loan)	8	(2)
2003–2004	Frem	31	(11)
2004–2005	Djurgården	13	(10)
2005–2008	Schalke 04	51	(10)
2008–2011	Toulouse	9	(0)
2009–2010	→ MSV Duisburg (loan)	10	(5)
2011	→ Feyenoord (loan)	6	(0)
2011–2014	AGF	61	(16)
Total		229	(66)

International career
1997–1998	Denmark U17	20	(6)
1998–2001	Denmark U19	11	(4)
2003	Denmark U21	3	(0)
2005–2010	Denmark	20	(11)
- * Club domestic league appearances and goals

Søren Larsen (Danish pronunciation: [ˈsœːɐ̯n̩ ˈlɑːsn̩]; born 6 September 1981) is a Danish former professional footballer who played as a striker. He was a strong player with a decent header and good sense of positioning. He played in Denmark, Sweden, Germany, France, and the Netherlands during a career that spanned between 1997 and 2014. A full international between 2005 and 2010, he won 20 caps and scored 11 goals for the Denmark national team and was a squad member at the 2010 FIFA World Cup.

== Club career ==
Larsen started his professional career at Danish club Køge Boldklub in Køge, Denmark.

In 2001, he was sold to multiple Danish championship winners Brøndby IF in the top-flight Danish Superliga. At Brøndby he did not enjoy much success, and only played a single game in the 2001–02 Superliga season, which Brøndby went on to win, although he became well known for his bellyflop goal celebration, a result of which he was injured. He was sent on loan to fellow Danish club BK Frem by then-Brøndby manager Michael Laudrup.

In 2004, he was sold to Swedish club Djurgårdens IF, playing just two matches before being sidelined for the remainder of 2004 with a groin injury. When Djurgården won 2005 Swedish Cup and the 2005 Allsvenskan Larsen was a key player until he was sold.

After a two-month-long controversy Larsen was sold to German club FC Schalke 04 on 31 July 2005, signing a four-year contract. At Schalke 04, he earned the nickname "Der Dänische Joker" (The Danish joker), "The Blonde Bomber" and "Die Waffe" (The weapon), referring to his ability to come on as a substitute and score the game-tying or -winning goal. He was, however, not able to keep up the good performances due to injuries, and he later lost his place in the Schalke team. He became fed up with his role on the bench and decided to look for a new club.

On 18 July 2008, Larsen moved to Toulouse as a replacement for the outgoing Johan Elmander. On 24 January 2009, he scored his first four goals for the club in an 8–0 win against amateur team Schirrhein in the Coupe de France, but after one year he turned back to Germany and signed a one-year loan deal with MSV Duisburg. Larsen scored five goals in ten games and returned to Toulouse. In 2011, he moved to Feyenoord on loan. On 12 July 2011, despite having two years remaining on his contract, he left Toulouse by mutual consent.

On 13 July 2011, he signed a three-year contract with the Danish Superliga side AGF Aarhus, and made his debut appearance for the first team only five days later, at home against Lyngby Boldklub. On 30 July 2011, he scored his first goal, an important equalizer in the 2–2 draw home against Odense BK. In the first two games of September 2011, Larsen scored an impressive seven goals: On 1 September 2011 he scored four goals in a 5–2 win in a Cup match against 1. Division side Blokhus FC. On 12 September 2011, he netted a hat-trick in a 4–2 win against FC Midtjylland.

On 18 February 2014, he announced that he would be retiring immediately due to a knee injury.

== International career ==
On 2 June 2005, Larsen was handed his international debut by Denmark manager Morten Olsen, when he came on as a substitute in the 1–0 win over Finland. He continued his good form by sensationally scoring six goals in his first five national team matches from June to September 2005. Larsen was named in Olsen's final 23-man squad for the 2010 World Cup in South Africa.

Larsen scored eleven goals in 20 games for Denmark.

== Career statistics ==
=== International ===
Scores and results list Denmark's goal tally first.

List of international goals scored by Sören Larsen

#	Date	Venue	Opponent	Score	Result	Competition
1	8 June 2005	Copenhagen, Denmark	Albania	1–0	3–1	2006 FIFA World Cup qualifier
2	8 June 2005	Copenhagen, Denmark	Albania	2–0	3–1	2006 FIFA World Cup qualifier
3	7 August 2005	Copenhagen, Denmark	England	4–1	4–1	Friendly
4	3 September 2005	Istanbul, Turkey	Turkey	2–2	2–2	2006 FIFA World Cup qualifier
5	7 September 2005	Copenhagen, Denmark	Georgia	5–1	6–1	2006 FIFA World Cup qualifier
6	7 September 2005	Copenhagen, Denmark	Georgia	6–1	6–1	2006 FIFA World Cup qualifier
7	11 October 2008	Copenhagen, Denmark	Malta	1–0	3–0	2010 FIFA World Cup qualifier
8	11 October 2008	Copenhagen, Denmark	Malta	3–0	3–0	2010 FIFA World Cup qualifier
9	28 March 2009	Attard, Malta	Malta	1–0	3–0	2010 FIFA World Cup qualifier
10	28 March 2009	Attard, Malta	Malta	2–0	3–0	2010 FIFA World Cup qualifier
11	1 April 2009	Copenhagen, Denmark	Albania	2–0	3–0	2010 FIFA World Cup qualifier

== Honours ==
Brøndby

- Danish Superliga: 2001–02

Djurgårdens IF

- Allsvenskan: 2005
- Svenska Cupen: 2004

Schalke 04

- DFB-Ligapokal: 2005
