= Patrick Amoah =

Swedish footballer (born 1986)

Personal information
- Full name: Patrick Amoah
- Date of birth: 18 August 1986 (age 40)
- Place of birth: Solna, Sweden
- Height: 1.84 m (6 ft 0 in)
- Positions: Striker; defender (Note: Amoah played as a striker earlier in his career, and as a defender later in his career.)

Team information
- Current team: IFK Tumba

Youth career
- Djurgården

Senior career*
Years	Team	Apps	(Gls)
2004–2007	Djurgården	40	(4)
2006	→ Assyriska FF (loan)	23	(4)
2007–2008	CF Atlético Ciudad	17	(10)
2008–2009	Paris FC	8	(3)
2009–2011	White Star Woluwe	59	(43)
2011	OH Leuven	9	(1)
2012–2013	White Star Woluwe	33	(8)
2013–2014	Fortuna Sittard	26	(4)
2015	Huddinge	25	(1)
2016–2018	Vasalund	63	(8)
2019	Haninge	19	(2)
2020	FOC Farsta	0	(0)
2021	Segeltorp	0	(0)
2023–	IFK Tumba	0	(0)

International career
2003	Sweden U17	1	(0)
2005	Sweden U19	5	(1)
- * Club domestic league appearances and goals as of 1 January 2020

Patrick Amoah (born 18 August 1986) is a Swedish footballer who plays as a defender for IFK Tumba in the Swedish Sixth Division.

== Club career ==
=== Djurgårdens IF and Assyriska FF (loan) ===
Amoah joined the Swedish Allsvenskan side Djurgårdens IF from the junior squad at the start of the 2004 Allsvenskan season and then joined Assyriska FF on loan in the 2006 Superettan season before returning to Djurgårdens IF after helping the club avoid relegation to the Division 1 2007 season.

=== CF Atlético Ciudad and Paris FC ===
Amoah then went on to play in Spain in 2007, signing with CF Atlético Ciudad for the 2007–08 Tercera División season before joining French side Paris FC for the 2008–09 Championnat National season.

=== White Star Woluwe ===
Amoah then signed for his first club in Belgium, White Star Woluwe, who were at the time playing in the Belgian Third Division. He helped the club gain promotion from the Third Division to the Belgian Second Division by scoring 35 goals in 46 games in the 2010–2011 Belgian Third Division season. This prolific strike rate earned him a move to newly 2011–12 Belgian Pro League season promoted side OH Leuven.

=== OH Leuven ===
Amoah joined Belgium Belgian Pro League side OH Leuven for the 2011–12 Belgian Pro League in August 2011. In his first official match for OHL, which was also the first match at the highest level of Belgian football for a team from Leuven in over 60 years, Amoah scored an injury time winner against Belgian giants Anderlecht. However, this proved to be his only goal for OHL as he appeared in six further games without scoring, eventually leading to his demotion to the substitute bench. Midway through the season, he transferred back to Woluwe.

=== Return to White Star Woluwe ===
Amoah returned to former club White Star Woluwe on the first day of 2012, 1 January, to help the club gain promotion from the 2011–12 Belgian Second Division to the 2012–2013 Belgian Pro League.

=== Fortuna Sittard ===
Amoah signed a two-year contract with the Dutch Jupiler League team Fortuna Sittard in 2013, but left the team already in 2014.

=== Back to Sweden ===
After half a year without a club, Amoah signed for Swedish third division team Huddinge in January 2015.

== Personal life ==
Amoah was born to a Finnish mother and Ghanaian father.

== Honours ==
Djurgårdens IF

- Allsvenskan: 2005
- Svenska Cupen: 2004
