= Abgar Barsom =

Swedish Assyrian football player

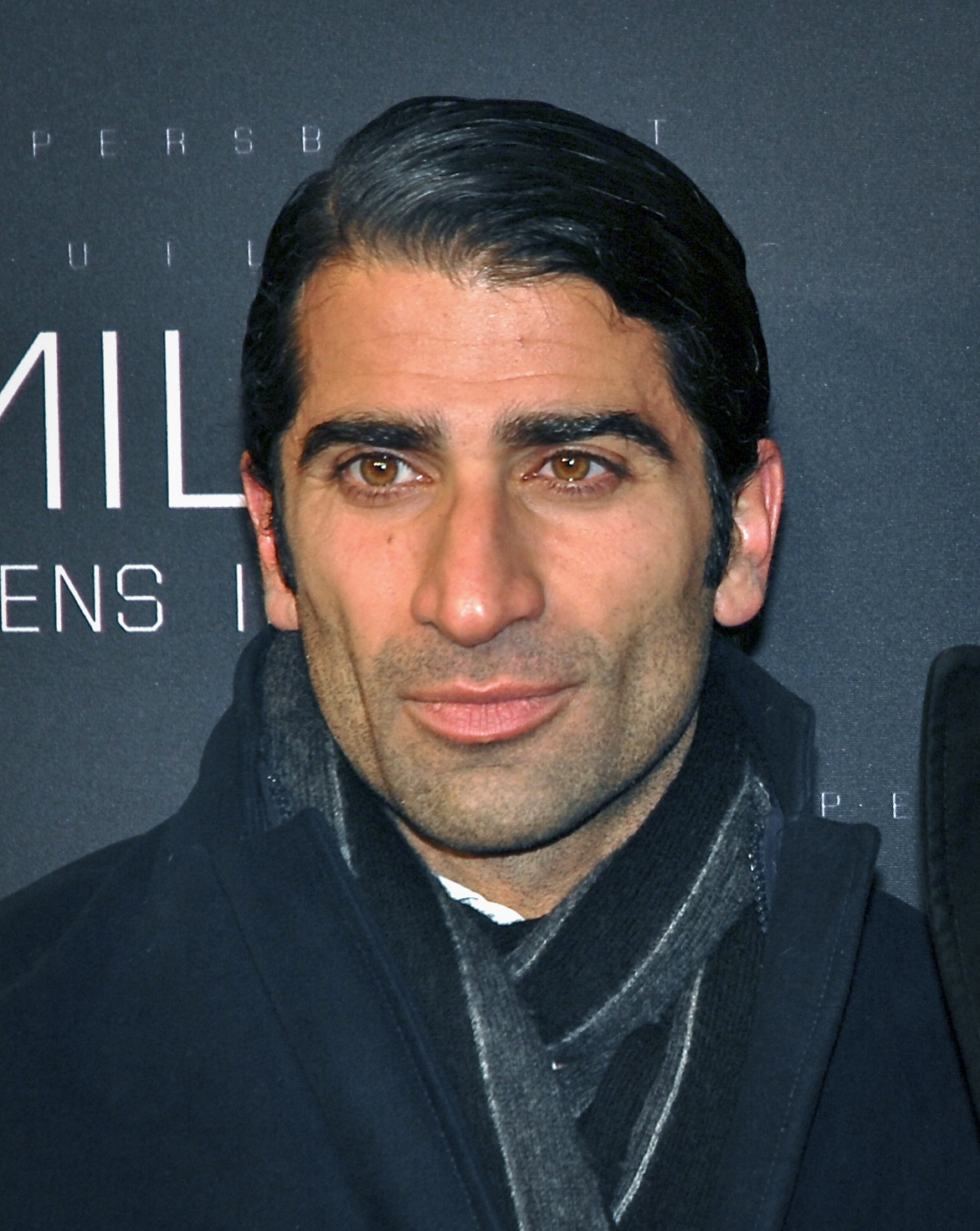
- Abgar Barsom in 2012

Personal information
- Date of birth: 4 September 1977 (age 49)
- Place of birth: Örebro, Sweden
- Height: 1.72 m (5 ft 8 in)
- Position: Midfielder

Senior career*
Years	Team	Apps	(Gls)
1996–1999	Forward	96	(15)
2000–2002	Djurgården	58	(6)
2002–2003	Heerenveen	7	(0)
2004–2006	Djurgården	46	(4)
2007	Messiniakos	16	(2)
2007	Örebro	6	(1)
2008–2009	Fredrikstad	45	(4)
2010–2011	Syrianska	50	(1)
Total		324	(33)

International career
1993	Sweden U17	5	(0)
- * Club domestic league appearances and goals as of 8 November 2012

Abgar Barsom (born 4 September 1977) is a Swedish former professional footballer who played as a midfielder.

== Club career ==
He made his first spell at Djurgården from 2000 to 2002, after having joined Djurgården from Forward. He was later sold to Heerenveen in the Netherlands, but his time at the Abe Lenstra Stadion was not successful. Consequently, Barsom returned to Sweden and Djurgården at the start of the 2004 season. He has won the Swedish championship twice, in 2002 and 2005. After the 2006 season, Barsom announced that he was looking for a new challenge in another club. He signed a six-month contract with Greek club Messiniakos in the second division. When his contract with Messiniakos ran out, he signed for Allsvenskan team Örebro. After saving the club from relegation and the contract with Örebro had expired, he joined Norwegian club Fredrikstad. He finished his career with Syrianska.

== International career ==
Barsom appeared five times for the Sweden U17 team in 1993.

== Personal life ==
Barsom is of Assyrian-Swedish descent. He is a Syriac Orthodox Christian and prays frequently.

Barsom ran in the 2006 Stockholm municipal election for the Christian Democrats.

== Honours ==
Djurgården

- Allsvenskan: 2002, 2005
- Superettan : 2000
- Svenska Cupen: 2002, 2004, 2005

=== Individual ===
- Allsvenskan Player of the Month: June 2001
- Swedish Newcomer of the Year: 2001
