= Oskar Wahlström =

Swedish footballer

Personal information
- Date of birth: 16 August 1976 (age 50)
- Height: 1.98 m (6 ft 6 in)
- Position: Goalkeeper

Youth career
- Bie GoIF

Senior career*
Years	Team	Apps	(Gls)
–1998	Katrineholms SK		
1998–1999	IFK Västerås		
2000–2003	Västerås SK		
2004–2009	Djurgårdens IF	21	(0)
2010–2011	Västerås SK	20	(0)
- * Club domestic league appearances and goals

Oskar Wahlström (born 16 August 1976) is a Swedish former football goalkeeper. He most recently played for Djurgårdens IF after retiring after the 2009 season. Wahlström joined Djurgården in 2004, leaving Västerås SK. He made his Allsvenskan debut against Landskrona BoIS on 2 May 2004 as a substitute. Wahlström has also represented Katrineholms SK and Bie GoIF.

== Honours ==
Djurgårdens IF

- Allsvenskan: 2005
