= Elias Storm =

Swedish footballer (born 1979)

Personal information
- Date of birth: 19 July 1979 (age 47)
- Place of birth: Stockholm, Sweden
- Height: 1.90 m (6 ft 3 in)
- Position: Centre-back

Senior career*
Years	Team	Apps	(Gls)
2002–2006	Djurgården	24	(1)
2005	→ GIF Sundsvall (loan	10	(0)
2006	→ Örgryte IS (loan	12	(2)
2007–2009	FK Haugesund	11	(0)
2010	IK Sirius		
- * Club domestic league appearances and goals

Elias Storm (born 19 July 1979) is a Swedish former professional footballer who played as a centre-back. Storm was part of the Djurgården Swedish champions' team of 2002, 2003, and 2005.

== Honours ==
Djurgårdens IF

- Allsvenskan (3): 2002, 2003, 2005
