= Stefan Bergtoft =

Swedish footballer (born 1979)

Personal information
- Date of birth: 24 March 1979 (age 47)
- Height: 1.81 m (5 ft 11 in)
- Position: Midfielder

Youth career
- Kälvesta IoF

Senior career*
Years	Team	Apps	(Gls)
1996–1999	Spånga IS		
2000–2006	Djurgårdens IF		
2007–2008	IF Brommapojkarna		
2009	Spånga IS		
- * Club domestic league appearances and goals

Stefan Bergtoft (born 24 March 1979) is a Swedish former professional footballer who played as a midfielder. He played in the Allsvenskan for Djurgårdens IF.

== Honours ==
Djurgårdens IF

- Allsvenskan: 2002, 2003, 2005
