= Niclas Rasck =

Swedish footballer

Personal information
- Full name: Niclas Leif Rasck
- Date of birth: 10 March 1969 (age 57)
- Height: 1.78 m (5 ft 10 in)
- Position: Defender

Senior career*
Years	Team	Apps	(Gls)
1989–1993	Ludvika FK		
1994–1998	Örebro SK	80	(5)
1999–2006	Djurgårdens IF	152	(3)
- * Club domestic league appearances and goals

Niclas Leif Rasck (born 10 March 1969) is a Swedish former footballer who played as a defender and spent most of his career with Djurgårdens IF. He made 152 appearances for Djurgården.

Prior to joining the Stockholm club, he played for Örebro SK and Ludvika FK, where his career began. He declared his retirement from professional football at the end of the 2006 season.

== Honours ==
Djurgårdens IF

- Allsvenskan: 2002, 2003, 2005
- Superettan: 2000
- Svenska Cupen: 2002, 2004, 2005
