= Tomas Backman =

Swedish football player

Personal information
- Full name: Tomas Olof Edvard Backman Sinclair
- Date of birth: June 16, 1980 (age 46)
- Height: 1.83 m (6 ft 0 in)
- Position: Defender

Team information
- Current team: Tenhults IF
- Number: 15

Youth career
- Kubbe/Norrflärke IF
- Anundsjö IF

Senior career*
Years	Team	Apps	(Gls)
2004	Friska Viljor FC	13	(2)
2004–2007	Djurgårdens IF	11	(1)
2005	→ GIF Sundsvall (loan)	3	(0)
2006	→ Östers IF (loan)	23	(1)
2007–2011	Jönköpings Södra IF	84	(8)
2011–	Tenhults IF		
- * Club domestic league appearances and goals

Tomas Backman (born 1980) is a Swedish football player who plays for Tenhults IF. Prior to that, he has played for Kubbe/Norrflärke IF, Anundsjö IF, Friska Viljor FC, Djurgårdens IF, GIF Sundsvall and Östers IF. He joined Öster in 2006 on a loan contract from Djurgården. After his spell in Östers IF, he chose to play for Jönköpings Södra IF in early 2007. He primarily plays as a full back but can also play as a midfielder.

== Honours ==
=== Club ===
Djurgårdens IF

- Svenska Cupen (2): 2004, 2005
