= 2005 Allsvenskan =

81st season of Allsvenskan

Allsvenskan
- Season: 2005
- Champions: Djurgårdens IF
- Relegated: Landskrona BoIS (after play-offs); GIF Sundsvall; Assyriska Föreningen
- Champions League: Djurgårdens IF
- UEFA Cup: IFK Göteborg
- Intertoto Cup: Kalmar FF
- Matches: 182
- Goals: 487 (2.68 per match)
- Top goalscorer: Gunnar Heidar Thorvaldsson, Halmstads BK (16)
- Average attendance: 8,691

Allsvenskan 2005, part of the 2005 Swedish football season, was the 81st Allsvenskan season played. The first match was played 9 April 2005 and the last match was played 23 October 2005. Djurgårdens IF won the league ahead of runners-up IFK Göteborg, while Landskrona BoIS, GIF Sundsvall and Assyriska Föreningen were relegated.

== Participating clubs ==
Location of the 2005 Allsvenskan teams.

Club	Last season	First season in league	First season of current spell
Assyriska Föreningen	3rd (Superettan)	2005	2005
Djurgårdens IF	4th	1927–28	2001
IF Elfsborg	9th	1926–27	1997
Gefle IF	2nd (Superettan)	1933–34	2005
IFK Göteborg	3rd	1924–25	1977
Halmstads BK	2nd	1933–34	1993
Hammarby IF	6th	1924–25	1998
Helsingborgs IF	10th	1924–25	1993
BK Häcken	1st (Superettan)	1983	2005
Kalmar FF	5th	1949–50	2004
Landskrona BoIS	11th	1924–25	2002
Malmö FF	1st	1931–32	2001
GIF Sundsvall	7th	1965	2000
Örgryte IS	12th	1924–25	1995

== League table ==
Pos	Team	Pld	W	D	L	GF	GA	GD	Pts	Qualification or relegation
1	Djurgårdens IF (C)	26	16	5	5	60	26	+34	53	Qualification to Champions League second qualifying round
2	IFK Göteborg	26	14	7	5	38	22	+16	49	Qualification to UEFA Cup first qualifying round
3	Kalmar FF	26	11	10	5	36	21	+15	43	Qualification to Intertoto Cup first round
4	Hammarby IF	26	12	7	7	43	30	+13	43	
5	Malmö FF	26	12	5	9	38	27	+11	41	
6	Helsingborgs IF	26	12	3	11	32	38	−6	39	
7	IF Elfsborg	26	10	7	9	35	43	−8	37	
8	BK Häcken	26	11	3	12	29	29	0	36	
9	Örgryte IS	26	10	5	11	37	38	−1	35	
10	Halmstads BK	26	9	5	12	38	38	0	32	
11	Gefle IF	26	9	4	13	27	33	−6	31	Qualification to UEFA Cup first qualifying round (Note: Sweden was among the best three associations in the UEFA Fair Play ranking and thus received an additional spot in the first qualifying round of the Europa League, Gefle received the qualifying spot for their ranking in Allsvenskans Fair Play ranking.)
12	Landskrona BoIS (R)	26	8	6	12	26	44	−18	30	Qualification to Relegation play-offs
13	GIF Sundsvall (R)	26	6	7	13	31	46	−15	25	Relegation to Superettan
14	Assyriska FF (R)	26	4	2	20	17	52	−35	14	Relegation to Superettan

Source: svenskfotboll.se (in Swedish)
Rules for classification: 1) points; 2) goal difference; 3) number of goals scored.
(C) Champions; (R) Relegated

== Results ==
Home \ Away	AFF	DIF	IFE	GIF	IFKG	HBK	HAM	HEL	BKH	KFF	LBoIS	MFF	GIFS	ÖIS
Assyriska FF		0–2	1–2	0–3	2–3	0–0	1–2	0–1	0–1	0–7	0–1	0–2	1–0	0–1
Djurgårdens IF	3–1		8–1	3–1	0–0	6–1	2–2	5–2	2–1	3–1	0–1	2–0	4–0	2–2
IF Elfsborg	1–3	1–2		1–0	0–2	1–1	4–1	2–0	2–0	1–0	1–2	3–1	2–1	1–0
Gefle IF	1–0	1–3	1–2		0–2	2–0	1–1	1–2	0–0	1–2	0–0	2–1	2–1	0–2
IFK Göteborg	0–3	1–3	1–1	0–1		4–0	1–0	0–0	1–0	0–0	4–2	2–1	2–0	3–0
Halmstads BK	5–0	3–1	1–1	1–4	0–2		1–2	2–0	1–0	0–1	5–1	0–0	6–0	4–2
Hammarby IF	3–0	2–1	0–0	0–1	3–2	2–1		6–2	3–1	0–0	4–0	1–1	0–0	0–0
Helsingborgs IF	2–0	2–0	3–0	2–1	0–2	2–0	2–1		0–1	2–2	1–0	0–1	2–1	1–0
BK Häcken	0–2	1–0	2–2	2–1	3–1	0–1	1–3	3–0		1–1	3–0	1–0	1–0	1–2
Kalmar FF	1–0	0–2	1–1	1–0	0–0	2–0	3–0	2–0	2–0		2–2	0–2	0–0	2–1
Landskrona BoIS	2–1	0–2	4–1	0–1	1–1	0–0	0–3	4–3	0–1	1–1		0–1	1–0	1–0
Malmö FF	2–2	1–3	1–1	3–0	1–2	2–1	0–1	2–0	2–1	1–0	5–0		6–2	1–0
GIF Sundsvall	5–0	1–1	3–1	2–2	0–0	1–3	2–1	1–1	3–0	0–2	2–2	2–0		3–2
Örgryte IS	2–0	0–0	4–2	2–0	1–2	2–1	3–2	1–2	0–4	3–3	2–1	1–1	4–1	

Source: Swedish Football Association (in Swedish)
Legend: Blue = home team win; Yellow = draw; Red = away team win.

== Relegation play-offs ==
26 October 2005
19:10

GAIS	2–1	Landskrona BoIS
Lundgren 6'; Blomqvist 21'		Amuneke 90'

Gamla Ullevi, Gothenburg
Attendance: 7,606
Referee: Peter Fröjdfeldt (Eskilstuna)

30 October 2005
16:10

Landskrona BoIS	0–0	GAIS

Landskrona IP, Landskrona
Attendance: 7,859
Referee: Jonas Eriksson (Stockholm)

GAIS won 2–1 on aggregate.

== Season statistics ==
=== Top scorers ===
Rank	Player	Club	Goals
1	(Iceland) Gunnar Heiðar Þorvaldsson	Halmstads BK	16
2	(Brazil) Afonso Alves	Malmö FF	14
3	(Brazil) Aílton Almeida	Örgryte IS	13
3	(Sweden) Hasse Berggren	IF Elfsborg	13
5	(Sweden) Jones Kusi-Asare	Djurgårdens IF	12
6	(Denmark) Søren Larsen	Djurgårdens IF	10
7	(Sweden) Tobias Hysén	Djurgårdens IF	9
7	(Sweden) Björn Runström	Hammarby IF	9
7	(Sweden) Stefan Selakovic	IFK Göteborg	9
10	(Sweden) Daniel Bernhardsson	Gefle IF	8
10	(Brazil) Paulinho Guará	Örgryte IS/Hammarby IF	8
10	(Sweden) Jonas Henriksson	BK Häcken	8
10	(Liberia) Dioh Williams	BK Häcken	8

=== Attendances ===
	Club	Home average	Away average	Home high
1	Malmö FF	15,961	10,016	26,504
2	Djurgårdens IF	14,075	10,651	27,108
3	IFK Göteborg	12,721	12,864	33,622
4	Helsingborgs IF	11,466	8,029	16,495
5	Hammarby IF	11,450	9,720	15,322
6	IF Elfsborg	10,745	7,879	17,070
7	Halmstads BK	7,124	8,240	13,928
8	Örgryte IS	6,228	9,618	25,843
9	Kalmar FF	5,936	8,059	9,465
10	GIF Sundsvall	5,828	6,675	7,741
11	Gefle IF	5,729	6,722	7,211
12	Landskrona BoIS	5,660	6,761	9,649
13	BK Häcken	4,198	7,976	14,803
14	Assyriska Föreningen	3,859	7,976	14,232
—	Total	8,642	—	33,622
