= 2002 Djurgårdens IF season =

Djurgården
2002 season
- Chairman: Bo Lundquist
- Manager: Sören Åkeby & Zoran Lukić
- Stadium: Stockholms Stadion
- Allsvenskan: Winners
- Svenska Cupen: Winners
- UEFA Cup: 2nd round
- Top goalscorer: League: Kim Källström (12); All: Kim Källström (17)
- Highest home attendance: 29,423 (13 April vs AIK, Allsvenskan)
- Lowest home attendance: 1,970 (19 July vs Väsby IK, Svenska Cupen)

In the 2002 season, Djurgårdens IF competed in the Allsvenskan, the Svenska Cupen, and the UEFA Cup.

== Squad information ==
=== Squad ===
Note: Flags indicate national team as defined under FIFA eligibility rules; some limited exceptions apply. Players may hold more than one non-FIFA nationality.

No.	Pos.	Nation	Player
1	GK	(Sweden) SWE	Rami Shaaban
1	GK	(Sweden) SWE	Kjell Frisk
2	DF	(Sweden) SWE	Patrik Eriksson Ohlsson
3	DF	(Sweden) SWE	Mikael Dorsin
4	DF	(Sweden) SWE	Elias Storm
5	DF	(Sweden) SWE	Richard Henriksson
6	MF	(Sweden) SWE	Magnus Pehrsson
7	MF	(Sweden) SWE	Abgar Barsom
8	FW	(Sweden) SWE	Christer Mattiasson
9	FW	(Sweden) SWE	Stefan Bärlin
10	MF	(Sweden) SWE	Andreas Johansson
11	FW	(Sweden) SWE	Johan Wallinder
12	DF	(Sweden) SWE	Markus Karlsson
13	MF	(Sweden) SWE	Stefan Bergtoft

No.	Pos.	Nation	Player
14	FW	(Sweden) SWE	Babis Stefanidis
15	GK	(Sweden) SWE	Andreas Isaksson
16	MF	(Sweden) SWE	Kim Källström
17	FW	(Sweden) SWE	Samuel Wowoah
18	DF	(Sweden) SWE	Niclas Rasck
19	FW	(Sweden) SWE	Pagguy Zunda
20	MF	(Sweden) SWE	Stefan Rehn
21	FW	(Sweden) SWE	Louay Chanko
22	FW	(The Gambia) GAM	Aziz Corr Nyang
23	MF	(Democratic Republic of the Congo) COD	Yannick Bapupa
24	FW	(Democratic Republic of the Congo) COD	René Makondele
25	FW	(Sweden) SWE	Johan Elmander (on loan from Feyenoord)
30	GK	(Sweden) SWE	Anders Alé

== Player statistics ==
Appearances for competitive matches only

No.	Pos	Nat	Player	Total		Allsvenskan		Svenska Cupen		UEFA Cup	
No.	Pos	Nat	Player	Apps	Goals	Apps	Goals	Apps	Goals	Apps	Goals
		(Democratic Republic of the Congo) COD	Yannick Bapupa	15	1	10	1	1	0	4	0
		(Sweden) SWE	Abgar Barsom	7	2	6	2	1	0	0	0
		(Sweden) SWE	Stefan Bergtoft	12	0	10	0	1	0	1	0
		(Sweden) SWE	Stefan Bärlin	21	4	16	0	4	4	1	0
		(Sweden) SWE	Louay Chanko	36	8	25	5	5	2	6	1
		(The Gambia) GAM	Aziz Corr Nyang	1	0	0	0	1	0	0	0
		(Sweden) SWE	Mikael Dorsin	34	0	24	0	4	0	6	0
		(Sweden) SWE	Johan Elmander	14	7	8	5	2	0	4	2
		(Sweden) SWE	Patrik Eriksson-Ohlsson	26	1	18	1	4	0	4	0
	GK	(Sweden) SWE	Kjell Frisk	0	0	0	0	0	0	0	0
		(Sweden) SWE	Richard Henriksson	26	2	18	0	5	2	3	0
	GK	(Sweden) SWE	Andreas Isaksson	31	0	20	0	5	0	6	0
		(Sweden) SWE	Andreas Johansson	38	12	26	10	6	2	6	0
		(Sweden) SWE	Markus Karlsson	34	0	23	0	5	0	6	0
		(Sweden) SWE	Kim Källström	36	17	24	12	6	3	6	2
		(Democratic Republic of the Congo) COD	René Makondele	8	1	5	1	1	0	2	0
		(Sweden) SWE	Christer Mattiasson	20	5	16	2	3	3	1	0
		(Italy) ITA	Matteo Placida	0	0	0	0	0	0	0	0
		(Sweden) SWE	Niclas Rasck	36	1	25	0	5	1	6	0
		(Sweden) SWE	Stefan Rehn	36	3	24	2	6	1	6	0
	GK	(Sweden) SWE	Rami Shaaban	7	0	6	0	1	0	0	0
		(Sweden) SWE	Babis Stefanidis	35	7	24	4	5	2	6	1
		(Sweden) SWE	Elias Storm	2	0	1	0	1	0	0	0
		(Sweden) SWE	Johan Wallinder	4	0	2	0	2	0	0	0
		(Sweden) SWE	Samuel Wowoah	27	6	18	3	3	1	6	2
		(Sweden) SWE	Pagguy Zunda	0	0	0	0	0	0	0	0

=== Topscorers ===
==== Total ====
Name	Goals
(Sweden) Kim Källström	17
(Sweden) Andreas Johansson	12
(Sweden) Louay Chanko	8
(Sweden) Johan Elmander	7
(Sweden) Babis Stefanidis	7
(Sweden) Samuel Wowoah	6
(Sweden) Christer Mattiasson	5
(Sweden) Stefan Bärlin	4
(Sweden) Stefan Rehn	3
(Sweden) Abgar Barsom	2
(Sweden) Richard Henriksson	2
(Democratic Republic of the Congo) Yannick Bapupa	1
(Democratic Republic of the Congo) René Makondele	1
(Sweden) Niclas Rasck	1
(Sweden) Patrik Eriksson Ohlsson	1

==== Allsvenskan ====
Name	Goals
(Sweden) Kim Källström	12
(Sweden) Andreas Johansson	10
(Sweden) Johan Elmander	5
(Sweden) Louay Chanko	5
(Sweden) Babis Stefanidis	4
(Sweden) Samuel Wowoah	3
(Sweden) Abgar Barsom	2
(Sweden) Christer Mattiasson	2
(Sweden) Stefan Rehn	2
(Democratic Republic of the Congo) Yannick Bapupa	1
(Democratic Republic of the Congo) René Makondele	1
(Sweden) Patrik Eriksson Ohlsson	1

==== Svenska Cupen ====
Name	Goals
(Sweden) Stefan Bärlin	4
(Sweden) Kim Källström	3
(Sweden) Christer Mattiasson	3
(Sweden) Louay Chanko	2
(Sweden) Andreas Johansson	2
(Sweden) Richard Henriksson	2
(Sweden) Babis Stefanidis	2
(Sweden) Samuel Wowoah	1
(Sweden) Stefan Rehn	1
(Sweden) Niclas Rasck	1

==== UEFA Cup ====
Name	Goals
(Sweden) Johan Elmander	2
(Sweden) Kim Källström	2
(Sweden) Samuel Wowoah	2
(Sweden) Louay Chanko	1
(Sweden) Babis Stefanidis	1

== Competitions ==
=== Allsvenskan ===
==== League table ====
Pos	Team	Pld	W	D	L	GF	GA	GD	Pts	Qualification or relegation
1	Djurgårdens IF (C)	26	16	4	6	51	33	+18	52	Qualification to Champions League second qualifying round
2	Malmö FF	26	14	4	8	52	32	+20	46	Qualification to UEFA Cup qualifying round
3	Örgryte IS	26	12	8	6	49	38	+11	44	Qualification to Intertoto Cup first round
4	Helsingborgs IF	26	10	8	8	38	38	0	38	
5	AIK	26	9	10	7	35	38	−3	37	Qualification to UEFA Cup qualifying round (Note: AIK qualified for the UEFA Cup as Svenska Cupen runners-up 2002.)

Source: svenskfotboll.se (in Swedish)
Rules for classification: 1) points; 2) goal difference; 3) number of goals scored.
(C) Champions

==== Matches ====
Game	Date	Tournament	Round	Ground	Opponent	Score^{1}	TV	Report
1	8 April	Allsvenskan	1	A	Malmö FF	2–1	PPV	Report / Report link; Attendance / 15,797; Referee / Karl-Erik Nilsson; Djurgårdens IF / Malmö FF; 1–0 31' Louay Chanko; 2–0 55' Kim Källström / 2–1 87' (pen) Niklas Skoog
2	13 April	Allsvenskan	2	HR	AIK	3–4	Canal+	Report / Report link; Attendance / 29,423; Referee / Anders Frisk; Djurgårdens IF / AIK; 1–0 5' Louay Chanko; 2–0 16' (pen.) Kim Källström; 3–2 58' Abgar Barsom / 1–2 30' Andreas Andersson; 2–2 36' Stefan Ishizaki; 3–3 74' Svante Samuelsson; 3–4 30' Andreas Andersson
3	22 April	Allsvenskan	3	A	Halmstads BK	1–1	PPV	Report / Report link; Attendance / 6,672; Referee / Martin Ingvarsson; Djurgårdens IF / Halmstads BK; 1–0 53' Abgar Barsom / 1–1 72' Torbjörn Arvidsson
5	27 April	Allsvenskan	4	H	IFK Göteborg	1–0	Canal+	Report / Report link; Attendance / 13,635; Referee / Karl-Erik Nilsson; Djurgårdens IF / IFK Göteborg; 1–0 80' Babis Stefanidis
6	2 May	Allsvenskan	5	A	Landskrona BoIS	1–1	PPV	Report / Report link; Attendance / 7,079; Referee / Anders Frisk; Djurgårdens IF / Landskrona BoIS; 1–1 79' Kim Källström / 0–1 6' Daniel Nannskog
7	5 May	Allsvenskan	6	H	Örebro SK	3–0	PPV	Report / Report link; Attendance / 11,470; Referee / Miro Ukalovic; Djurgårdens IF / Örebro SK; 1–0 50' Kim Källström; 1–0 60' Christer Mattiasson; 3–0 75' (pen.) Kim Källström
9	12 May	Allsvenskan	7	A	GIF Sundsvall	1–2	PPV	Report / Report link; Attendance / 8,255; Referee / Martin Ingvarsson; Djurgårdens IF / GIF Sundsvall; 1–0 64' own goal / 0–1 4' Mattias Thorsell; 0–2 55' Jon Eriksson
11	5 July	Allsvenskan	8	HR	IF Elfsborg	1–1	PPV	Report / Report link; Attendance / 10,912; Referee / Miro Ukalovic; Djurgårdens IF / IF Elfsborg; 1–1 72' Andreas Johansson / 0–1 35' Hans Berggren
12	9 July	Allsvenskan	9	H	Örgryte IS	2–3	PPV	Report / Report link; Attendance / 10,435; Referee / Martin Ingvarsson; Djurgårdens IF / Örgryte IS; 1–1 12' own goal 2–3 88' Christer Mattiasson / 0–1 9' Afonso Alves; 1–2 38' Afonso Alves; 1–3 52' Afonso Alves
13	15 July	Allsvenskan	10	AR	Hammarby IF	2–1	PPV	Report / Report link; Attendance / 25,626; Referee / Leif Sundell; Djurgårdens IF / Hammarby IF; 1–0 37' Samuel Wowoah; 2–1 68' Samuel Wowoah / 1–1 61' Jonas Stark
15	24 July	Allsvenskan	11	H	Helsingborgs IF	1–1	PPV	Report / Report link; Attendance / 11,763; Referee / Lars Kratz; Djurgårdens IF / Helsingborgs IF; 1–1 59' Andreas Johansson / 0–1 46' Álvaro Santos
16	29 July	Allsvenskan	12	A	IFK Norrköping	1–0	PPV	Report / Report link; Attendance / 15,177; Referee / Anders Frisk; Djurgårdens IF / IFK Norrköping; 1–0 90+4' (pen.) Kim Källström
17	4 August	Allsvenskan	13	H	Kalmar FF	1–0	PPV	Report / Report link; Attendance / 9,878; Referee / Håkan Jonasson; Djurgårdens IF / Kalmar FF; 1–0 35' (pen.) Andreas Johansson
18	8 August	Allsvenskan	14	A	AIK	3–0	Canal+	Report / Report link; Attendance / 28,334; Referee / Peter Fröjdfeldt; Djurgårdens IF / AIK; 1–0 15' Andreas Johansson; 2–0 29' Louay Chanko; 3–0 73' Kim Källström
19	11 August	Allsvenskan	15	H	Malmö FF	3–4	PPV	Report / Report link; Attendance / 13,130; Referee / Martin Hansson; Djurgårdens IF / Malmö FF; 1–1 8' Andreas Johansson; 2–4 55' Kim Källström; 3–4 90' Andreas Johansson / 0–1 4' Peter Ijeh; 1–2 13' Peter Ijeh; 1–3 16' Peter Ijeh; 1–4 32' Daniel Majstorović
21	18 August	Allsvenskan	16	H	Halmstads BK	1–3	PPV	Report / Report link; Attendance / 9,453; Referee / Peter Fröjdfeldt; Djurgårdens IF / Halmstads BK; 1–0 16' Stefan Rehn / 1–1 29' Sharbel Touma; 1–2 33' (pen.) Sharbel Touma; 1–3 42' Mattias Thylander
22	25 August	Allsvenskan	17	A	IFK Göteborg	2–1	PPV	Report / Report link; Attendance / 9,554; Referee / Leif Sundell; Djurgårdens IF / IFK Göteborg; 1–1 62' Babis Stefanidis; 2–1 84' Andreas Johansson / 0–1 57' Martin Ericsson
24	1 September	Allsvenskan	18	H	Landskrona BoIS	1–0	PPV	Report / Report link; Attendance / 13,123; Referee / Keijo Hyvärinen; Djurgårdens IF / Landskrona BoIS; 1–0 21' Yannick Bapupa
25	11 September	Allsvenskan	19	A	Örebro SK	3–0	PPV	Report / Report link; Attendance / 11,936; Referee / Anders Frisk; Djurgårdens IF / Örebro SK; 1–0 18' Patrik E Ohlsson; 2–0 65' Johan Elmander; 3–0 83' Babis Stefanidis
26	15 September	Allsvenskan	20	A	Helsingborgs IF	3–1	Canal+	Report / Report link; Attendance / 12,116; Referee / Leif Sundell; Djurgårdens IF / Helsingborgs IF; 1–0 12' Johan Elmander; 2–0 60' Johan Elmander; 3–0 90+2' Louay Chanko / 2–1 74' Álvaro Santos
28	22 September	Allsvenskan	21	H	IFK Norrköping	6–3	PPV	Report / Report link; Attendance / 12,857; Referee / Martin Ingvarsson; Djurgårdens IF / IFK Norrköping; 1–0 4' Samuel Wowoah; 2–1 40' Andreas Johansson; 3–1 54' Kim Källström; 4–2 76' Babis Stefanidis; 5–2 86' René Makondele; 6–3 90+1' Andreas Johansson / 1–1 21' (pen.) Antti Sumiala; 3–2 71' Georgios Karatanasis; 5–3 88' Jonas Wallerstedt
29	30 September	Allsvenskan	22	A	Örgryte IS	2–4	PPV	Report / Report link; Attendance / 10,300; Referee / Leif Sundell; Djurgårdens IF / Örgryte IS; 1–0 37' Louay Chanko; 2–2 67' Kim Källström / 1–1 58' Afonso Alves; 1–2 62' Afonso Alves; 2–3 70' Afonso Alves 2–4 90+' Martin Ulander
31	7 October	Allsvenskan	23	HR	Hammarby IF	2–1	Canal+	Report / Report link; Attendance / 24,858; Referee / Leif Sundell; Djurgårdens IF / Hammarby IF; 1–1 73' own goal 2–1 86' (pen.) Kim Källström / 0–1 49' Antti Pohja
32	20 October	Allsvenskan	24	A	Kalmar FF	1–0	PPV	Report / Report link; Attendance / 7,240; Referee / Anders Frisk; Djurgårdens IF / Kalmar FF; 0–1 23' Kim Källström
33	24 October	Allsvenskan	25	H	GIF Sundsvall	2–1	PPV	Report / Report link; Attendance / 14,266; Referee / Miro Ukalovic; Djurgårdens IF / GIF Sundsvall; 1–1 39' Johan Elmander; 2–1 50' Stefan Rehn / 0–1 13' Øyvind Svenning
35	2 November	Allsvenskan	26	A	IF Elfsborg	2–0	Canal+	Report / Report link; Attendance / 17,610; Referee / Anders Frisk; Djurgårdens IF / IF Elfsborg; 1–0 13' Johan Elmander; 2–0 61' Andreas Johansson

=== Svenska Cupen ===
Game	Date	Tournament	Round	Ground	Opponent	Score^{1}	TV	Report
4	24 April	Swedish Cup	Last 64	A	IFK Motala	7–0	–	Report / Report link; Attendance / 1,290; Referee / Bengt Green; Djurgårdens IF / IFK Motala; 1–0 10' Richard Henriksson; 2–0 15' Christer Mattiasson; 3–0 17' Andreas Johansson; 4–0 26' Richard Henriksson; 5–0 40' Christer Mattiasson; 6–0 62' Kim Källström; 7–0 65' Stefan Bärlin
8	7 May	Swedish Cup	Last 32	H	Sandvikens IF	1–0	–	Report / Report link; Attendance / 2,050; Referee / Johnny Lundbäck; Djurgårdens IF / Sandvikens IF; 1–0 39' Christer Mattiasson
10	27 June	Swedish Cup	Last 16	AR	IFK Malmö	5–1	–	Report / Report link; Attendance / 1,550; Referee / Miro Ukalovic; Djurgårdens IF / IFK Malmö; 1–0 9' Andreas Johansson; 2–0 10' Stefan Bärlin; 3–0 17' Kim Källström; 4–1 68' Stefan Bärlin; 5–1 80' Babis Stefanidis / 3–1 38' M Eriksson
14	19 July	Swedish Cup	Quarter-final	H	Väsby IK	3–2	–	Report / Report link; Attendance / 1,970; Referee / Peter Fröjfeldt; Djurgårdens IF / Väsby IK; 1–0 9' Samuel Wowoah; 2–1 54' (pen.) Kim Källström; 3–1 66' Stefan Bärlin / 1–1 30' Daniel Jansson; 3–2 90+2' Alexandros Pappas
29	26 September	Swedish Cup	Semi-final	H	Malmö FF	4–0	Kanal 5	Report / Report link; Attendance / 3,810; Referee / Leif Sundell; Djurgårdens IF / Malmö FF; 1–0 64' Niclas Rasck; 2–0 77' Babis Stefanidis; 3–0 82' Stefan Rehn; 4–0 85' Louay Chanko
36	9 November	Swedish Cup	Final	A	AIK	1–0	Kanal 5	Report / Report link; Attendance / 33,727; Referee / Martin Ingvarsson; Djurgårdens IF / AIK; 1–0 99' Louay Chanko

=== UEFA Cup ===
Game	Date	Tournament	Round	Ground	Opponent	Score^{1}	TV	Report
20	15 August	UEFA Cup	Qualifying round	A (Republic of Ireland)	Shamrock Rovers (Republic of Ireland)	3–1	–	Report / Report link; Attendance / 4,500; Referee / (Spain) Luis Medina Cantalejo; Djurgårdens IF / Shamrock Rovers; 1–0 17' Samuel Wowoah; 2–1 52' Babis Stefanidis; 3–1 69' Kim Källström / 1–1 50' Stephen McGuinness
23	29 August	UEFA Cup	Qualifying round	HR	Shamrock Rovers (Republic of Ireland)	2–0	–	Report / Report link; Attendance / 7,273; Referee / (Estonia) Sten Kaldma; Djurgårdens IF / Shamrock Rovers; 1–0 19' Samuel Wowoah; 2–0 21' Louay Chanko
27	19 September	UEFA Cup	First round	A (Denmark)	Copenhagen (Denmark)	0–0	Kanal 5	Report / Report link; Attendance / 7,273; Referee / (Slovenia) Drago Kos
30	3 October	UEFA Cup	First round	HR	Copenhagen (Denmark)	3–1	Kanal 5	Report / Report link; Attendance / 13,459; Referee / (Ukraine) Vitaliy Godulyan; Djurgårdens IF / Copenhagen; 1–0 13' own goal 2–0 45' Johan Elmander; 3–1 90+' (pen.) Kim Källström / 2–1 88' Bora Zivkovic
34	29 October	UEFA Cup	Second round	HR	Bordeaux (France)	0–1	Kanal 5	Report / Report link; Attendance / 13,558; Referee / (Slovakia) Anton Stredak; Djurgårdens IF / Bordeaux; / 0–1 63' Pascal Feindouno
37	29 October	UEFA Cup	Second round	A (France)	Bordeaux (France)	1–2	Kanal 5	Report / Report link; Attendance / 10,672; Referee / (Israel) Dani Koren; Djurgårdens IF / Bordeaux; 1–2 73' Johan Elmander / 0–1 36' Pascal Feindouno; 0–1 50' Pascal Feindouno
