= 2001 Djurgårdens IF season =

Djurgården
2001 season
- Chairman: Bo Lundquist
- Manager: Sören Åkeby & Zoran Lukić
- Stadium: Stockholms Stadion
- Allsvenskan: Runners-up
- Svenska Cupen: 5th round
- Top goalscorer: League: Jones Kusi-Asare (7); All: Jones Kusi-Asare (7)
- Highest home attendance: 28,060 (19 September vs AIK, Allsvenskan)
- Lowest home attendance: 0 (12 April vs IFK Göteborg, Svenska Cupen)

Djurgårdens IF was promoted from Superettan and finished second.

== Player statistics ==
Appearances for competitive matches only

No.	Pos	Nat	Player	Total		Allsvenskan		Svenska Cupen	
No.	Pos	Nat	Player	Apps	Goals	Apps	Goals	Apps	Goals
		(Sweden) SWE	Abgar Barsom	26	2	24	2	2	0
		(Sweden) SWE	Stefan Bergtoft	8	0	6	0	2	0
		(Sweden) SWE	Stefan Bärlin	23	6	21	6	2	0
		(Sweden) SWE	Louay Chanko	21	5	19	5	2	0
		(Sweden) SWE	Mikael Dorsin	22	0	21	0	1	0
		(Sweden) SWE	Patrik Eriksson-Ohlsson	24	1	22	1	2	0
		(Sweden) SWE	Richard Henriksson	6	1	5	1	1	0
		(Sweden) SWE	Andreas Isaksson	23	0	22	0	1	0
		(Sweden) SWE	Andreas Johansson	27	5	25	4	2	1
		(Sweden) SWE	Jesper Johansson	0	0	0	0	0	0
		(Sweden) SWE	Markus Karlsson	24	0	23	0	1	0
		(Sweden) SWE	Jones Kusi-Asare	24	7	22	7	2	0
		(Sweden) SWE	Anders Limpar	0	0	0	0	0	0
		(Sweden) SWE	Christer Mattiasson	13	2	13	2	0	0
		(Sweden) SWE	Magnus Pehrsson	22	5	20	2	2	3
		(Sweden) SWE	Niclas Rasck	28	0	26	0	2	0
		(Sweden) SWE	Stefan Rehn	27	1	25	1	2	0
		(Sweden) SWE	Joel Riddez	2	0	2	0	0	0
		(Sweden) SWE	Magnus Samuelsson	25	2	24	2	1	0
		(Sweden) SWE	Rami Shaaban	6	0	5	0	1	0
		(Sweden) SWE	Babis Stefanidis	8	0	8	0	0	0
		(Sweden) SWE	Jörgen Sundström	1	0	0	0	1	0
		(Sweden) SWE	Johan Wallinder	20	4	19	3	1	1
		(Sweden) SWE	Pagguy Zunda	0	0	0	0	0	0

=== Topscorers ===
==== Svenska Cupen ====
Name	Goals
(Sweden) Magnus Pehrson	3
(Sweden) Andreas Johansson	1
(Sweden) Johan Wallinder	1

== Competitions ==
=== Allsvenskan ===
==== League table ====
Pos	Team	Pld	W	D	L	GF	GA	GD	Pts	Qualification or relegation
1	Hammarby IF (C)	26	14	6	6	45	28	+17	48	Qualification to Champions League second qualifying round
2	Djurgårdens IF	26	13	8	5	36	24	+12	47	Qualification to UEFA Cup qualifying round
3	AIK	26	12	9	5	45	29	+16	45	Qualification to UEFA Cup qualifying round
4	IFK Göteborg	26	12	8	6	41	31	+10	44	Qualification to UEFA Cup qualifying round
5	Helsingborgs IF	26	11	9	6	47	29	+18	42	Qualification to Intertoto Cup first round

Source: svenskfotboll.se (in Swedish)
Rules for classification: 1) points; 2) goal difference; 3) number of goals scored.
(C) Champions

==== Matches ====
17 April 2001	Helsingborgs IF	1 – 0	Djurgårdens IF	Helsingborg
		Report		Stadium: Olympia

21 April 2001	Djurgårdens IF	0 – 4	Malmö FF	Stockholm
		Report		Stadium: Stockholms Stadion

29 April 2001	Örebro SK	2 – 2	Djurgårdens IF	Örebro
		Report		Stadium: Eyravallen

6 May 2001	Djurgårdens IF	0 – 0	Örgryte IS	Stockholm
		Report		Stadium: Stockholms Stadion

10 May 2001	Djurgårdens IF	0 – 0	Trelleborgs FF	Stockholm
		Report		Stadium: Stockholms Stadion

15 May 2001	AIK	1 – 1	Djurgårdens IF	Solna
		Report		Stadium: Råsunda Stadium

21 May 2001	Djurgårdens IF	2 – 1	Halmstads BK	Stockholm
		Report		Stadium: Stockholms Stadion

27 May 2001	GIF Sundsvall	0 – 0	Djurgårdens IF	Sundsvall
		Report		Stadium: Idrottsparken

12 June 2001	Djurgårdens IF	2 – 0	Hammarby IF	Solna
		Report		Stadium: Råsunda Stadium

18 June 2001	BK Häcken	1 – 2	Djurgårdens IF	Gothenburg
		Report		Stadium: Rambergsvallen

25 June 2001	Djurgårdens IF	3 – 1	IFK Göteborg	Stockholm
		Report		Stadium: Stockholms Stadion

1 July 2001	IF Elfsborg	1 – 2	Djurgårdens IF	Borås
		Report		Stadium: Ryavallen

8 July 2001	IFK Norrköping	2 – 0	Djurgårdens IF	Norrköping
		Report		Stadium: Idrottsparken

22 July 2001	Djurgårdens IF	3 – 0	IF Elfsborg	Stockholm
		Report		Stadium: Stockholms Stadion

31 July 2001	IFK Göteborg	0 – 2	Djurgårdens IF	Gothenburg
		Report		Stadium: Gamla Ullevi

5 August 2001	Djurgårdens IF	2 – 1	BK Häcken	Stockholm
		Report		Stadium: Stockholms Stadion

9 August 2001	Hammarby IF	0 – 1	Djurgårdens IF	Solna
		Report		Stadium: Råsunda Stadium

20 August 2001	Djurgårdens IF	0 – 2	IFK Norrköping	Stockholm
		Report		Stadium: Stockholms Stadion

6 September 2001	Djurgårdens IF	2 – 0	Örebro SK	Stockholm
		Report		Stadium: Stockholms Stadion

11 September 2001	Malmö FF	1 – 3	Djurgårdens IF	Malmö
		Report		Stadium: Malmö Stadion

19 September 2001	Djurgårdens IF	1 – 2	AIK	Solna
		Report		Stadium: Råsunda Stadium

24 September 2001	Örgryte IS	1 – 1	Djurgårdens IF	Gothenburg
		Report		Stadium: Gamla Ullevi

2 October 2001	Djurgårdens IF	1 – 1	GIF Sundsvall	Stockholm
		Report		Stadium: Stockholms Stadion

14 October 2001	Halmstads BK	0 – 0	Djurgårdens IF	Halmstad
		Report		Stadium: Örjans Vall

22 October 2001	Djurgårdens IF	3 – 2	Helsingborgs IF	Stockholm
		Report		Stadium: Stockholms Stadion

27 October 2001	Trelleborgs FF	0 – 3	Djurgårdens IF	Trelleborg
		Report		Stadium: Vångavallen

=== Svenska Cupen ===
4 April 2001 Round 4	Enköpings SK	3 – 4 (a.e.t.)	Djurgårdens IF	Vagnhärad
17:00	Berggren 54'; Andersson 78'; Kullinger 79'	Report	A. Johansson 27'; Pehrsson 83', 90' 103' (pen.)	Stadium: Vagnhärads IP; Attendance: 632; Referee: Johhny Lundbäck

12 April 2001 Round 5	Djurgårdens IF	1 – 2 (a.e.t.)	IFK Göteborg	Gothenburg
14:00	Wallinder 18'	Report	Mild 44'; Henriksson 95'	Stadium: Nya Ullevi; Attendance: 0 Referee: Håkan Jonasson
