= 2002 Svenska Cupen final =

- Event: 2002 Svenska Cupen
AIK	Djurgården
0	1
- Date: 9 November 2002
- Venue: Råsunda Stadium, Solna
- Referee: Martin Ingvarsson
- Attendance: 33,727

The 2002 Svenska Cupen final took place on 9 November 2002 at Råsunda Stadium in Solna. The match was contested by the Stockholm rivals AIK and Allsvenskan champions Djurgården. Substitute Louay Chanko scored the winning goal in extra time after a pass from Johan Elmander and secured "The Double" for Djurgården.

== Road to the Final ==
AIK		Round	Djurgårdens IF
Opponent	Result		Opponent	Result
Bodens BK	3–2	Round 2	IFK Motala	7–0
Motala AIF	4–0	Round 3	Sandvikens IF	1–0
Degerfors IF	2–1	Round 4	IFK Malmö	5–1
Hammarby IF	2–0	Quarter-finals	Väsby IK	3–2
IF Elfsborg	1–0	Semi-finals	Malmö FF	4–0

== Match details ==
9 November 2002
15:30 CET

AIK	0–1 (a.e.t.)	Djurgården
	Report	Chanko 99'

Råsunda Stadium, Solna
Attendance: 33,727
Referee: Martin Ingvarsson (Hässleholm)

AIK	Djurgården

AIK:
GK	1	(Sweden) Daniel Andersson
DF	3	(Sweden) Karl Corneliusson
DF	4	(Sweden) Benjamin Kibebe	(yellow card) 28'
DF	5	(Sweden) Per Nilsson
DF	2	(Sweden) Jimmy Tamandi
DF	23	(Sweden) Mats Rubarth	(yellow card) 9'	(substituted off) 54'
MF	7	(Sweden) Stefan Ishizaki
MF	14	(Sweden) Krister Nordin	(yellow card) 36'
MF	8	(Sweden) Daniel Tjernström
FW	9	(Sweden) Daniel Hoch		(substituted off) 80'
FW	10	(Sweden) Andreas Andersson	(yellow card) 15'	(substituted off) 68'
Substitutes:
MF	11	(Sweden) Martin Åslund		(substituted in) 54'
Manager:
(Czech Republic) Dušan Uhrin

DJURGÅRDEN:
GK	15	(Sweden) Andreas Isaksson
DF	18	(Sweden) Niclas Rasck	(yellow card) 48'
DF	2	(Sweden) Patrik Eriksson-Ohlsson	(yellow card) 71'
DF	12	(Sweden) Markus Karlsson (c)
DF	3	(Sweden) Mikael Dorsin
MF	20	(Sweden) Stefan Rehn
MF	10	(Sweden) Andreas Johansson
MF	25	(Sweden) Kim Källström
FW	14	(Sweden) Babis Stefanidis	(substituted off) 91'
FW	25	(Sweden) Johan Elmander
FW	17	(Sweden) Samuel Wowoah	(yellow card) 36'	(substituted off) 68'
Substitutes:
FW	21	(Sweden) Louay Chanko		(substituted in) 68'
FW	24	(Democratic Republic of the Congo) Rene Makondele		(substituted in) 82'
GK	30	(Sweden) Anders Alé
DF	7	(Sweden) Richard Henriksson
FW	18	(Sweden) Christer Mattiasson
Managers:
(Sweden) Zoran Lukić (Sweden) Sören Åkeby

MATCH OFFICIALS

- Assistant referees:
  - Peter Ekström (Enköping)
  - Fredrik Nilsson (Svalöv)
- Fourth official: Stefan Johannesson (Stockholm)

MATCH RULES

- 90 minutes.
- 30 minutes of extra-time if necessary.
- Penalty shoot-out if scores still level.
- Five named substitutes.
- Maximum of three substitutions.
