= Stefan Rehn =

Swedish footballer and manager

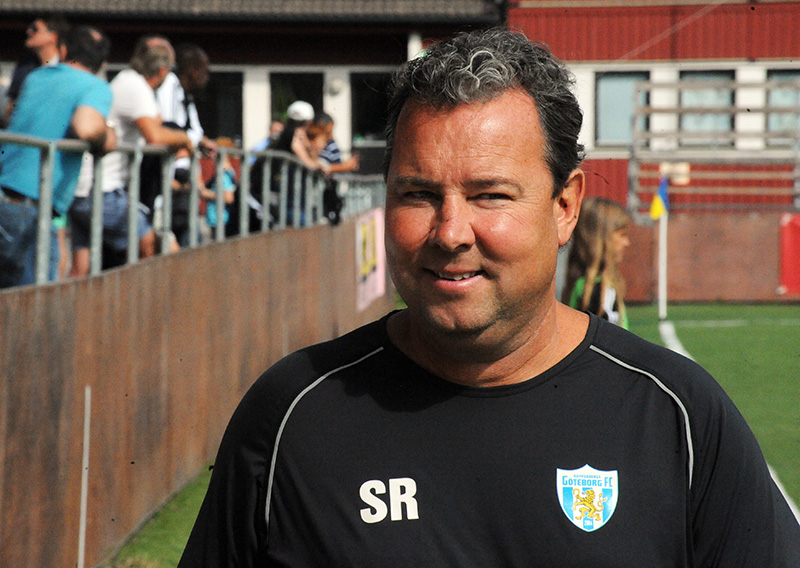
- Rehn in 2014

Personal information
- Full name: Jan Stefan Rehn
- Date of birth: 22 September 1966 (age 60)
- Place of birth: Stockholm, Sweden
- Height: 1.78 m (5 ft 10 in)
- Position: Midfielder

Youth career
- 1978–1984: Sundbybergs IK

Senior career*
Years	Team	Apps	(Gls)
1984–1989	Djurgårdens IF	119	(43)
1989–1990	Everton	4	(0)
1990–1995	IFK Göteborg	134	(26)
1995–2000	Lausanne Sports	172	(33)
2000–2002	Djurgårdens IF	67	(6)
Total		496	(108)

International career
1984–1985	Sweden U19	8	(1)
1986–1990	Sweden U21/O	22	(3)
1988–1995	Sweden	45	(6)

Managerial career
- 2003–2006: Djurgårdens IF (assistant)
- 2007–2010: IFK Göteborg
- 2010–2011: IFK Göteborg (assistant)
- 2011–2013: Jitex BK
- 2014–2017: Kopparbergs/Göteborg FC
- 2018–2020: Utsiktens BK
Medal record
Representing Sweden
Men's Football
FIFA World Cup
Bronze medal – third place	1994 United States	Team
- * Club domestic league appearances and goals

Jan Stefan Rehn (born 22 September 1966) is a Swedish football manager and former professional player who played as a midfielder. As a player he represented Djurgårdens IF, Everton, IFK Göteborg, and Lausanne Sports, winning a combined six Swedish Championships with the two Swedish clubs. He won 45 caps for the Sweden national team and represented his country at UEFA Euro 1992 and the 1994 FIFA World Cup. He also represented the Sweden Olympic team at the 1988 Summer Olympics.

== Club career ==
Rehn was born in Stockholm. After playing for a local club, he joined Djurgårdens IF from Stockholm. He made his debut in the senior team in the 1984 season. He was the Swedish football Division 2 top scorer in 1987. In 1988, he was part of Djurgården's Swedish Championship silver medal team and in 1989, he played in the 1989 Svenska Cupen Final loss against Malmö FF.

In the summer of 1989, he joined English club Everton for a cost of about half a million pounds from Djurgården. Rehn started two games and made four substitute appearances for the Toffees. His debut in the league, came 16 September 1989 at Selhurst Park against Charlton Athletic, when Everton won 1–0. Then it was 14 October 1989 when Millwall came to Goodison and were beaten 2–1. Rehn came on midway through the first half to replace an injured Ian Snodin and was immediately shadowed by the Londoners' combative midfielder Terry Hurlock. By the hour Rehn was replaced by Graeme Sharp and this game would come to be Rehn's Everton watershed and he soon condemned as being too lightweight for the English game.

In January 1990 he returned to Sweden and IFK Göteborg with which he won five Swedish Championships between 1990 and 1995. He then moved to Swiss club Lausanne Sports before rejoining his old club Djurgårdens IF in 2000, winning another Championship in 2002 before retiring.

== International career ==
Rehn, whose parents are from Åland, received a call-up for the Sweden U18 national team but was ineligible to play until 1984 when he acquired Swedish citizenship. In total, he made eight U18 appearances (one goal) and 17 U21 appearances (three goals).

Rehn made his international debut in a 1988 4–1 friendly win against East Germany, a match in which he also scored his first international goal in the 58th minute. He played two matches in the 1988 Summer Olympics for Sweden. He was part of the UEFA Euro 1992 squad, but did not play.

He was part of the Sweden senior national team that finished third at the 1994 FIFA World Cup.

== Management career ==
After his retirement, he was then part of Djurgården's coaching staff before taking the job as manager of his other previous Swedish club IFK Göteborg for the 2007 season as a joint manager with Jonas Olsson. He left in 2010. Between 2011 and 2013, he was head coach for Jitex BK, and in 2014 he joined Kopparbergs/Göteborg FC as head coach.

In May 2018, Rehn was appointed head coach of Utsiktens BK. In December 2019, Rehn announced in an interview, that he had agreed to sign a new two-year deal. However, on 29 January 2020, it was confirmed that he had left the club and that the parties never signed any extension in December 2019.

== Career statistics ==
=== Club ===
Appearances and goals by club, season and competition
Club	Season	League			National cup		League cup		Europe		Other		Total	
Club	Season	Division	Apps	Goals	Apps	Goals	Apps	Goals	Apps	Goals	Apps	Goals	Apps	Goals
Djurgårdens IF	1984	Division 2 Norra	14	3			–						14	3
Djurgårdens IF	1985	Division 2 Norra	25	10			–						25	10
Djurgårdens IF	1986	Allsvenskan	22	6			–						22	6
Djurgårdens IF	1987	Division 1 Norra	26	15			–						26	15
Djurgårdens IF	1988	Allsvenskan	20	8			–				4	0	24	8
Djurgårdens IF	1989	Allsvenskan	12	1	3	1	–						15	2
Djurgårdens IF	Total		119	43	3	1	–		0	0	4	0	126	44
Everton	1989–90	First Division	4	0									4	0
IFK Göteborg	1990	Allsvenskan	20	6			–						20	6
IFK Göteborg	1991	Allsvenskan	18	1			–		3	0	9	0	30	1
IFK Göteborg	1992	Allsvenskan	28	9			–		6	0			34	9
IFK Göteborg	1993	Allsvenskan	24	6			–		4	0			28	6
IFK Göteborg	1994	Allsvenskan	24	2			–		6	2			30	4
IFK Göteborg	1995	Allsvenskan	11	2			–		2	0			13	2
IFK Göteborg	Total		134	26	0	0	–		21	2	9	0	164	28
Lausanne Sports	1995–96	Nationalliga A	36	9			–						36	9
Lausanne Sports	1996–97	Nationalliga A	34	9			–						34	9
Lausanne Sports	1997–98	Nationalliga A	35	3			–						35	3
Lausanne Sports	1998–99	Nationalliga A	32	4			–		2	1			34	5
Lausanne Sports	1999–00	Nationalliga A	35	8			–		2	0			37	8
Lausanne Sports	Total		172	33	0	0	–		4	1	0	0	176	34
Djurgårdens IF	2000	Superettan	18	3	3	1	–						21	4
Djurgårdens IF	2001	Allsvenskan	25	1	2	0	–						27	1
Djurgårdens IF	2002	Allsvenskan	24	2	6	1	–		6	0			36	3
Djurgårdens IF	Total		67	6	11	2	–		6	0	0	0	84	8
Career total			496	108	14	3	0	0	31	3	13	0	545	114

=== International ===
Appearances and goals by national team and year
National team	Year	Apps	Goals
Sweden	1988	4	1
Sweden	1989	1	1
Sweden	1990	7	2
Sweden	1991	8	1
Sweden	1992	7	0
Sweden	1993	7	1
Sweden	1994	9	0
Sweden	1995	2	0
Total		45	6

Scores and results list Sweden's goal tally first, score column indicates score after each Rehn goal.

List of international goals scored by Stefan Rehn
No.	Date	Venue	Opponent	Score	Result	Competition	Ref.
1	12 January 1988	Estadio Municipal de Maspalomas, San Bartolomé de Tirajana, Spain	East Germany	3–1	4–1	Friendly	
2	16 June 1989	Parken, Copenhagen, Denmark	Brazil	1–0	2–1	1989 Tri Tournament	
3	17 February 1990	Al-Maktoum Stadium, Dubai, United Arab Emirates	United Arab Emirates	1–0	2–0	Friendly	
4	10 October 1990	Råsunda Stadium, Solna, Sweden	Germany	1–3	1–3	Friendly	
5	1 May 1991	Råsunda Stadium, Solna, Sweden	Austria	3–0	6–0	Friendly	
6	15 April 1993	Nepstadion, Budapest, Hungary	Hungary	2–0	2–0	Friendly	

== Honours ==
Djurgårdens IF

- Allsvenskan: 2002
- Svenska Cupen: 2002
- Superettan: 2000
- Division 1 Norra: 1987
- Division 2 Norra: 1985

IFK Göteborg

- Allsvenskan: 1990, 1991, 1993, 1994, 1995
- Svenska Cupen: 1991

Individual

- Kristallkulan: 1991, 1993
- Axpo Player of the Year: 1998
- Årets Järnkamin: 2001
- Swedish Manager of the Year: 2007
