= Kim Källström =

Swedish footballer (born 1982)

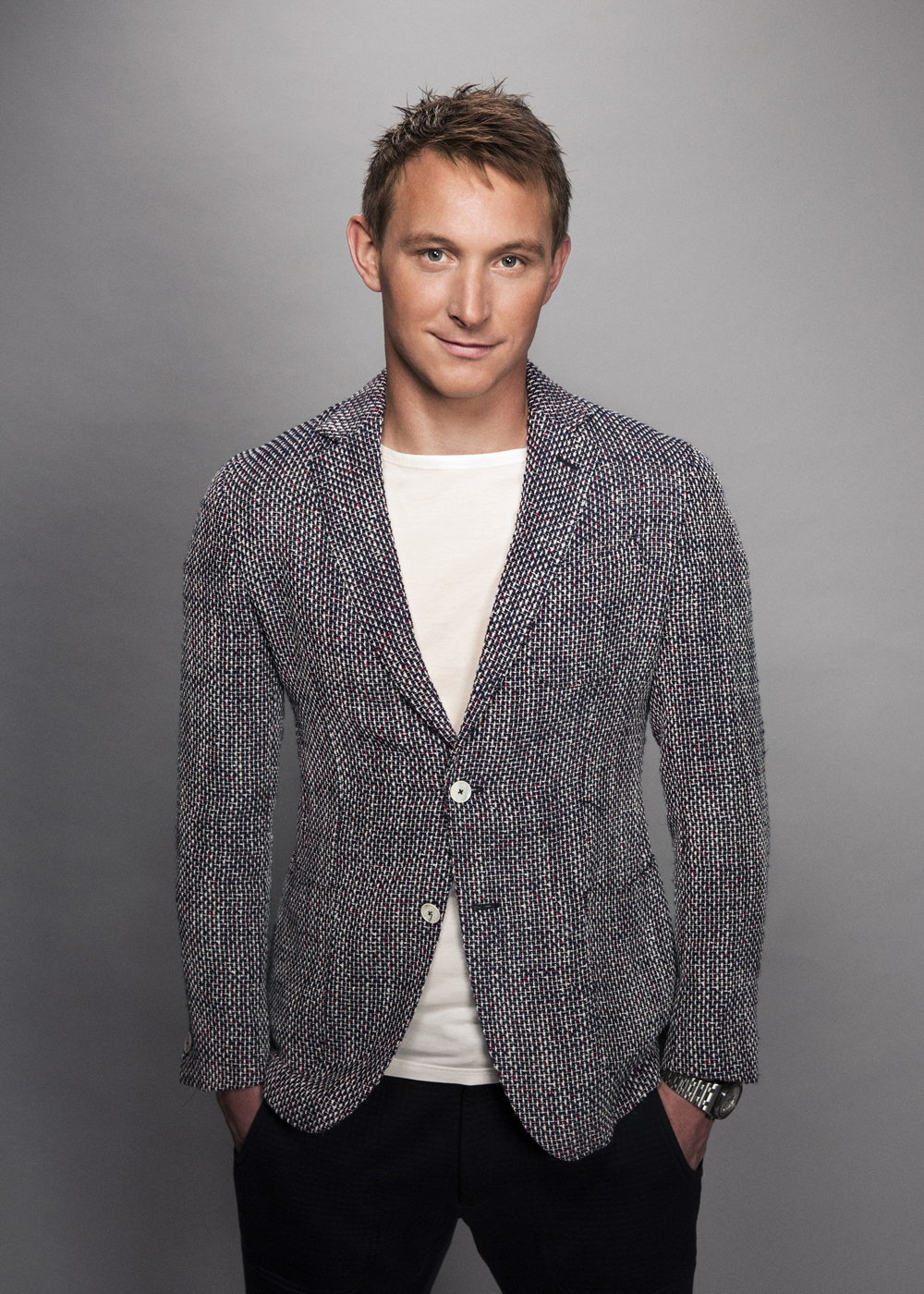
- Källström in 2016

Personal information
- Full name: Kim Mikael Källström
- Date of birth: 24 August 1982 (age 44)
- Place of birth: Sandviken, Sweden
- Height: 1.85 m (6 ft 1 in)
- Position: Midfielder

Youth career
- 1989–1990: Sandvikens IF
- 1990–1996: Partille IF
- 1996–1999: BK Häcken

Senior career*
Years	Team	Apps	(Gls)
1999–2001	BK Häcken	69	(14)
2002–2003	Djurgårdens IF	48	(26)
2004–2006	Rennes	83	(20)
2006–2012	Lyon	199	(17)
2012–2015	Spartak Moscow	58	(5)
2014	→ Arsenal (loan)	3	(0)
2015–2017	Grasshoppers	49	(1)
2017	Djurgårdens IF	28	(3)
Total		537	(86)

International career
1997–1999	Sweden U16	32	(12)
1999	Sweden U18	2	(0)
2000–2003	Sweden U21	21	(5)
2001–2016	Sweden	131	(16)
- * Club domestic league appearances and goals

Kim Mikael Källström (Swedish pronunciation: [ˈkɪmː ˈɕɛ̂lːstrœm]; born 24 August 1982) is a Swedish former professional footballer who played as a midfielder. He was noted for his play-making ability and free-kick taking.

He started his career at several clubs in Sweden, winning consecutive Allsvenskan titles with Djurgårdens IF before moving to France where he represented Rennes and Lyon. Källström won a range of domestic honours with Lyon and joined Spartak Moscow in 2012. He spent the second half of the 2013–14 season on loan at Arsenal, where he won the 2013–14 FA Cup after converting a penalty in the semi-final. Källström left Spartak in 2015 to join Grasshoppers, where he had a 49 game long spell before ending his career at Djurgårdens IF together with close friend Andreas Isaksson.

Källström earned 131 caps for Sweden since his debut in 2001 until 2016 when he announced his departure from international football, making him their fourth most capped player of all time. He played in four European Championships (Euro 2004, Euro 2008, Euro 2012, and Euro 2016) and the 2006 FIFA World Cup.

== Early life ==
Källström was born in Sandviken 24 August 1982 to footballer Mikael and Ann Källström. In 1989, he joined the local Sandvikens IF football team. In 1990, the family moved to Partille outside Gothenburg and Källström started to play for the local club Partille IF. When Källström was 17 years old he had a trial with Dutch club PSV.

== Club career ==
=== Early career ===
Källström began his professional career with BK Häcken from Gothenburg. In his first season, the club gained promotion the Allsvenskan by winning the Division 1 Södra. Häcken were relegated to the Superettan in 2001, but Källström's eight Allsvenskan goals earned him a transfer to Djurgårdens IF for SEK5m.

=== Djurgårdens IF ===
In his first season at Djurgården, Källström won the double of the Allsvenskan and the national cup tournament Svenska Cupen, and was the team's top scorer with twelve league goals. The team defended its Allsvenskan title in 2003, with Källström's 14 goals making him the team's top goalscorer and the second-highest goalscorer in Sweden.

He scored twice during the 2002–03 UEFA Cup, in fixtures against Shamrock Rovers and Copenhagen.

=== Rennes ===
In the January 2004 transfer window, Källström moved to the French Ligue 1 club Rennes. He made his debut for the club in the Coupe de France against Angers on 4 January and his first Ligue 1 appearance in a 2–0 defeat at Toulouse on 10 January. A week later, he scored his first goal in French football during a 4–0 win over Sochaux at the Route de Lorient. He ended the 2003–04 season with seven goals from 18 appearances, including two in a 4–1 away win against Champions League finalists Monaco.

During the 2004–05 season, Källström scored five times in 31 Ligue 1 matches to help Rennes finish fourth and qualify for the following season's UEFA Cup. On 5 February 2005, he received his first red card in French football in a 3–1 defeat at Marseille.

In 2005–06, he scored a career-best eight Ligue 1 goals, many of which came in fixtures against some of the biggest clubs in France. In June 2006, Rennes accepted a bid of around €8 million for the player from league champions Lyon.

Källström ended his two-and-a-half-year spell at Rennes with 20 goals from 83 league appearances.

=== Lyon ===
After a successful spell at Rennes, Källström signed for Lyon in June 2006, and went on to win a number of honours with the southern club.

His Lyon debut saw him score the equalising goal as les Gones won the Trophée des Champions against Paris Saint-Germain on penalties. Five days later, he made his league debut against Nantes in a 3–1 win.

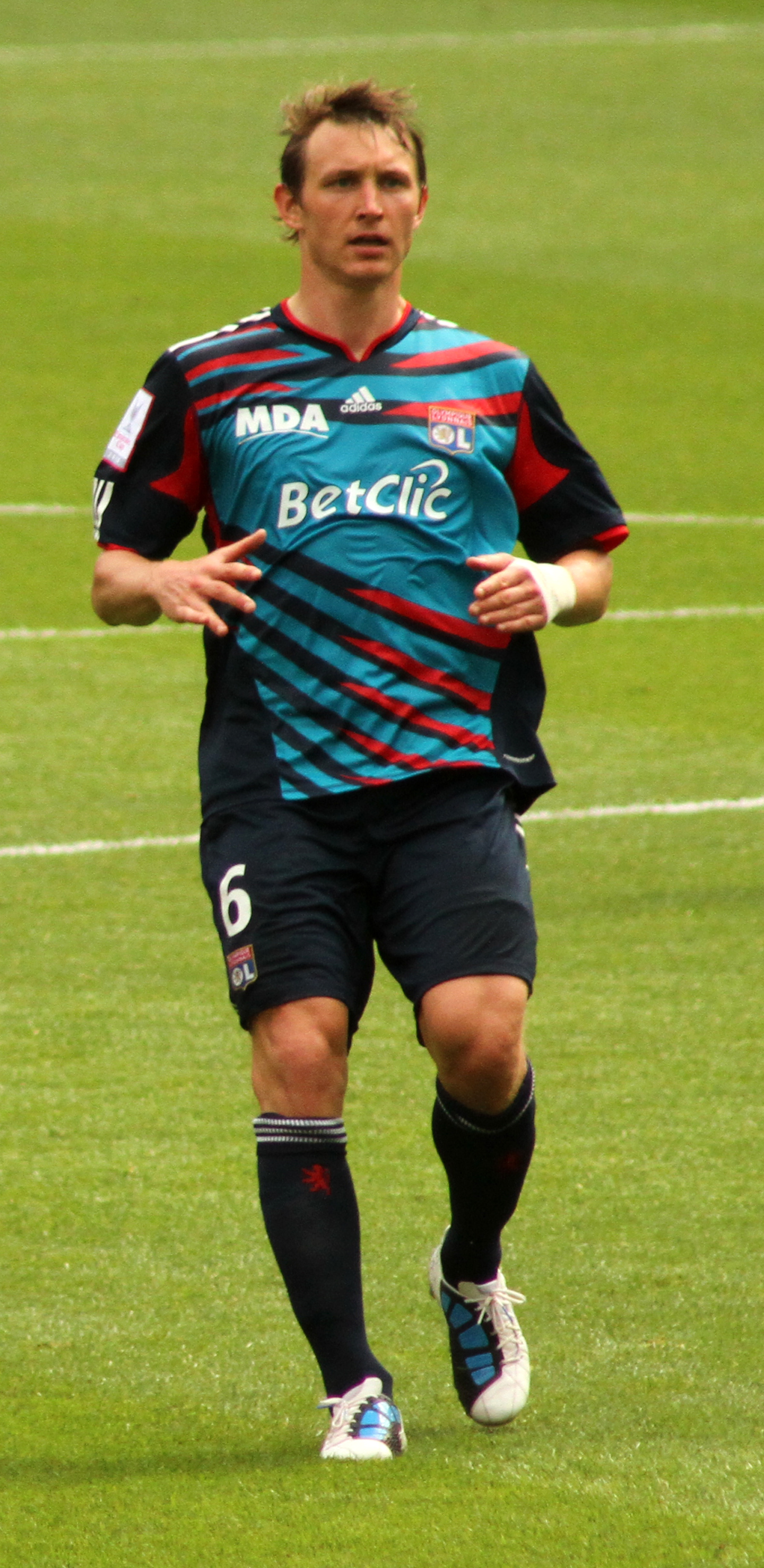
Källström playing for Olympique Lyonnais in 2010.

On 17 October 2006, Källström scored his first Lyon goal in a 3–0 win against Dynamo Kyiv in Champions League. After ending the group stage unbeaten – including a defeat of nine times champions Real Madrid at the Stade de Gerland – Lyon were knocked out in the round-of-16 by Roma.

On 22 October, Källström scored his first Ligue 1 goal for the club in a 4–1 Choc des Olympiques derby defeat of Marseille at the Stade Vélodrome. He scored further goals in league wins against Saint-Étienne and Nancy as Lyon won the French championship for the sixth consecutive season.

On 31 March 2008, he appeared as a 68th-minute substitute as Lyon were beaten 1–0 by Bordeaux in the 2008 Coupe de la Ligue Final.

The 2007–08 season began with Valencia rumoured to be interested in signing Källström from Lyon, who wanted to keep the player despite the €13 million offer. Källström remained at Lyon and, in the second round of the Ligue 1 season, was sent off after spitting towards a linesman during a 1–0 loss at Toulouse.

On 29 September 2007, he scored his first goal of the season in a 3–0 victory against Lens. A week later, he scored again in a 3–1 win at Bordeaux. On 8 November, he scored in a 4–2 Champions League defeat of VfB Stuttgart. However, Lyon were again knocked out in the round-of-16, losing to eventual winners Manchester United 2–1 on aggregate in March 2008.

On 2 December 2007, Källström scored two goals and assisted another as Lyon beat Strasbourg 5–0 at the Gerland. On the final day of the league season, Källström scored in a 3–1 win at Auxerre to secure a seventh league title. On 28 May 2008, he started in the 2008 Coupe de France Final as Lyon completed the club's first league and cup double with a 1–0 win against Paris Saint-Germain at the Stade de France.

On 16 November 2008, Källström scored his first goal of the 2008–09 season in a 2–1 win over championship rivals Bordeaux to put Lyon seven points clear at the top of the Ligue 1 table. His only other goal came in a 1–1 draw with his former club Rennes on 1 March 2009. Poor late season form saw OL slip to third in the table, with Bordeaux winning the championship on the final day of the season.

Källström scored four goals in Ligue 1 during the 2009–10 season. His first goal came in a 2–0 win against Lens on 3 October 2009. On 20 January 2010, he scored twice in a 3–1 win at Lorient. His final goal was scored in a 2–2 draw with Valenciennes on the penultimate matchday of the season.

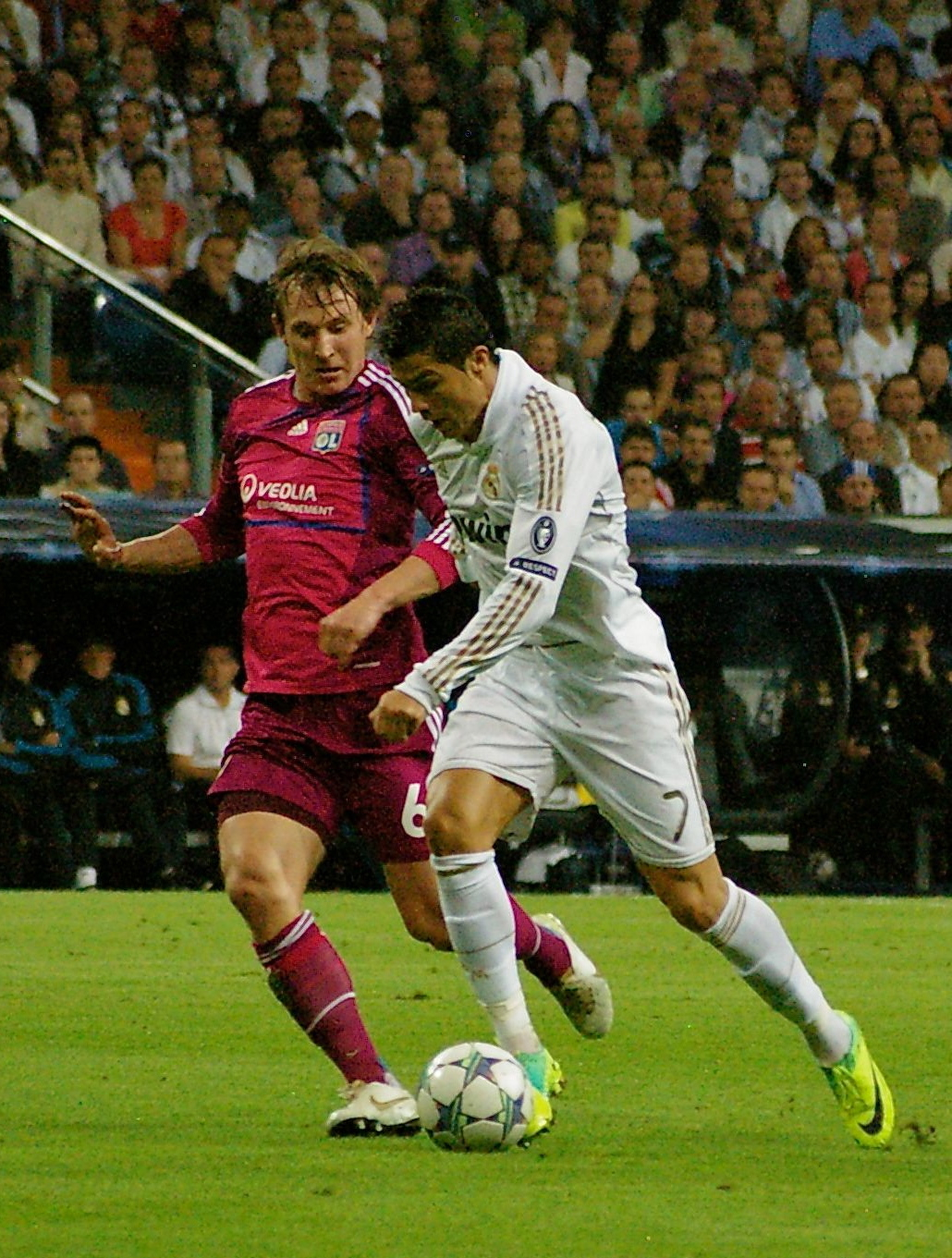
Källström with Lyon against Cristiano Ronaldo and Real Madrid during their group stage match in the UEFA Champions League on 18 October 2011.

On 8 November 2009, he started in a 5–5 Choc des Olympiques draw with Marseille. OM went on to win the league title, with Lyon six points behind in second place.

The 2009–10 Champions League saw Lyon have the club's most successful season in the competition. Källström scored in a 4–0 win at Hungarian champions Debreceni and made eleven appearances overall, helping les Gones reach the semi-finals where they lost to Bayern Munich.

During 2010–11, Källström occasionally provided cover at left-back, in addition to his favoured midfield role. He scored three goals in Ligue 1, including the equaliser against eventual champions Lille in a 1–1 draw.

The 2011–12 season was Källström's last at the club. He made 32 appearances in Ligue 1 without scoring.

In the Coupe de France, he scored one goal and assisted another as Lyon knocked out Paris Saint-Germain with a 3–1 win at the Parc des Princes at the quarter-final stage. A 4–0 win against Ajaccio in the semi-finals put OL into the 2012 Coupe de France Final, where Källström played the full 90 minutes in a 1–0 win over Quevilly. Lyon also reached the final of the 2011–12 Coupe de la Ligue, with Källstrom scoring in the quarter-final defeat of Lille. However, Lyon's chances of a cup double were ended by a 1–0 extra time defeat by Marseille.

In August 2012, Källström left Lyon after six seasons. Overall, he made 283 appearances for the club, winning two Ligue 1 titles, two Coupes de France and two Trophées des Champions. He was also a runner-up in the Coupe de la Ligue on two occasions.

=== Spartak Moscow ===
On 28 July 2012, it was announced that Källström had signed with Spartak Moscow for €3 million plus €600,000 in potential add-ons. On 15 September, he made his Russian Premier League debut in a 2–2 draw with Kuban Krasnodar. On 29 September, he scored his first goal for the club in a 3–1 against Amkar Perm.

He played in all of Spartak's 2012–13 UEFA Champions League group matches, receiving a red card in a 2–1 defeat at Celtic on 5 December 2012.

==== Loan to Arsenal ====
On 31 January 2014, Källström joined Arsenal on loan for the remainder of the 2013–14 season. Although a back injury was discovered during his medical, it was decided Källström would still join and undergo his rehabilitation at Arsenal. Källström made his debut for Arsenal on 25 March against Swansea City in the Premier League, coming on in the 79th minute as a substitute for Tomáš Rosický. His next appearance came two weeks later in the FA Cup semi-finals against defending champions Wigan Athletic. Introduced as an extra-time substitute, he scored Arsenal's second spot kick in their 4–2 penalty shoot-out win which saw them advance to the final. Källström has gone on to describe this moment as "the greatest 15 minutes of my life." Three days later, he made his first start for Arsenal in a 3–1 victory against West Ham United. Arsenal went on to win the FA Cup; Källström was not in the match day squad for the final. After making four appearances in all competitions, it was announced that Källström would not return to Arsenal once his loan spell with them expired at the end of the season. Despite only making four appearances, Källström said he enjoyed his time at Arsenal.

=== Grasshoppers ===
After three years in Russia, Källström left Spartak and signed for Swiss Super League club Grasshoppers on 6 June 2015. He scored his only goal for the club on 29 November 2015, the final goal in a 5–0 win against city rivals FC Zürich. Källström was also named captain upon his arrival at the side. After one and a half years, Källström wanted to leave Grasshoppers, citing personal reasons and dissatisfaction with the club's results. He subsequently ended his contract with the club by mutual consent on 31 January 2017.

=== Return to Djurgårdens IF and retirement ===
On 10 February, Källström returned to Djurgårdens IF in Allsvenskan, signing a two-year deal with the club. Källström was immediately handed his old number 16. The club's announcement of signing Källström lead to a crash of the official website of Djurgården, dif.se, due to the number of visitors on the website. After playing 28 league games in 2017, scoring three goals and providing seven assists, Källström announced his retirement from football on 15 December that year.

== International career ==
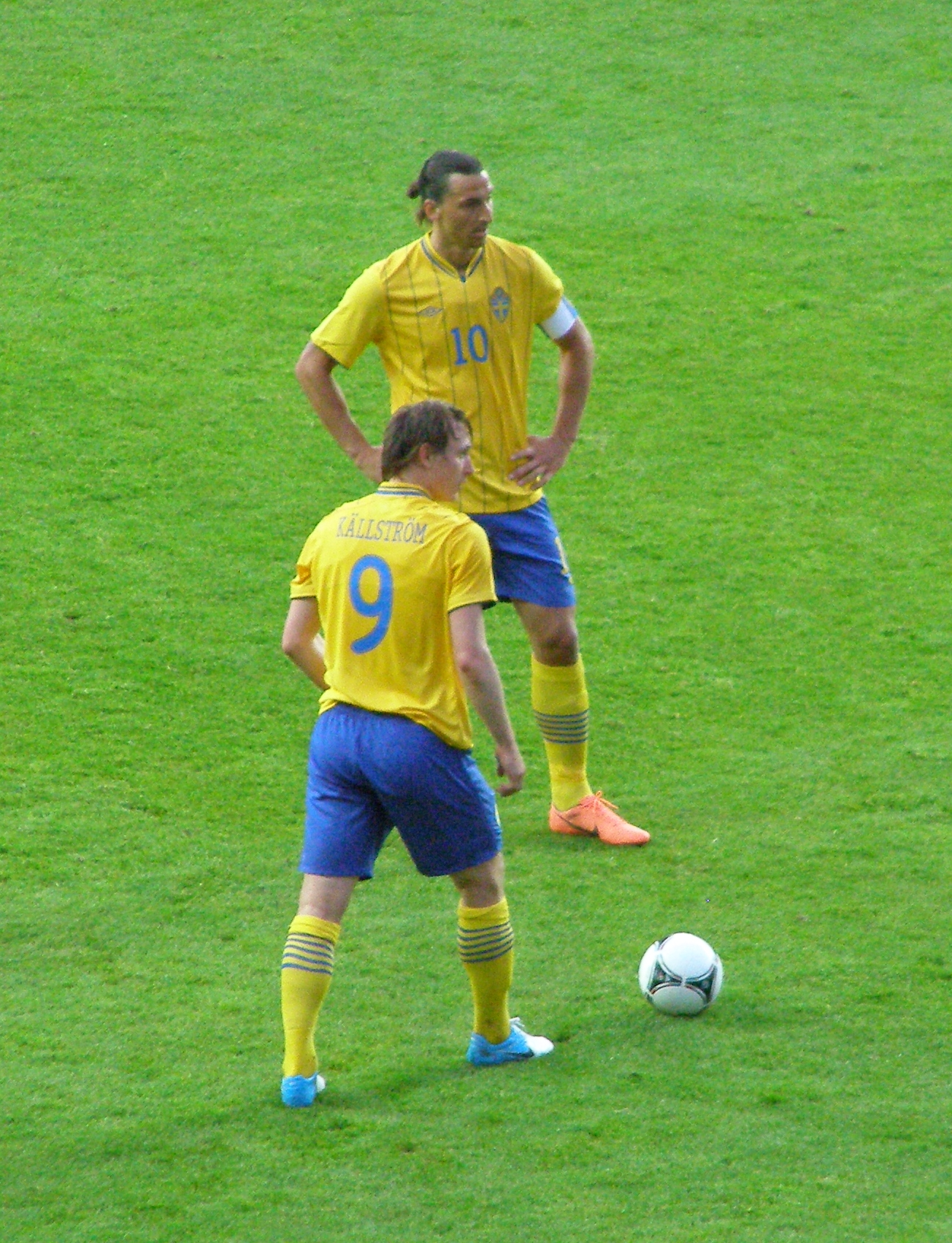
Källström and Zlatan Ibrahimović preparing a free kick in May 2012

Källström made his international debut in 2001 against Finland. He made the Swedish squad for the UEFA Euro 2004, 2006 FIFA World Cup, UEFA Euro 2008, and UEFA Euro 2012 tournaments. He also scored Sweden's first goal in the 3–2 win over the Netherlands to take the Blågult to Euro 2012.

In a 2014 World Cup qualifier against Germany on 16 October 2012, Källström was brought on as a substitute for Pontus Wernbloom at half time with Sweden losing 3–0. Despite conceding another goal, with three assists from him, Sweden earned a 4–4 draw.

In the return match against Germany, Källström comforted Max, a team mascot who suffers from Williams Syndrome, and a photo of this went viral on social media. Max's father Emil wrote to Källström, expressing his thanks. He said: "Because of your actions, Kim, my son could experience precisely the same emotions as everyone else who has been a mascot: pride, a sense of being special, 'I did it' and an immense joy."

Källström retired from the national team after Euro 2016, having amassed 131 caps, scoring 16 goals. He is Sweden's fourth most capped player.

== Playing style ==
A central midfielder who could also play on the left side of midfield as a wide midfielder, Källström had the potential to work as a deep-lying playmaker or as a more attacking influence. He was also known for his left-footed free kick ability.

== Career statistics ==
=== Club ===
Appearances and goals by club, season and competition (Note: European appearances while playing in Sweden should relate to the Euro season immediately after the domestic one e.g. 2002 entry should include 2002–03 Euro stats.)
Club	Season	League			National cup (Note: Includes Svenska Cupen, Coupe de France, Russian Cup, FA Cup, Swiss Cup)		League cup (Note: Includes Coupe de la Ligue)		Continental		Other		Total	
Club	Season	Division	Apps	Goals	Apps	Goals	Apps	Goals	Apps	Goals	Apps	Goals	Apps	Goals
BK Häcken	1999	Division 1 Södra	22	4	2	1	–		–		–		24	5
BK Häcken	2000	Allsvenskan	23	2	3	1	–		–		–		26	3
BK Häcken	2001	Allsvenskan	24	8	1	0	–		–		–		25	8
BK Häcken	Total		69	14	6	2	–		–		–		75	16
Djurgårdens IF	2002	Allsvenskan	24	12	6	3	–		6 (Note: Appearances in UEFA Cup)	1	–		36	16
Djurgårdens IF	2003	Allsvenskan	24	14	3	1	–		2 (Note: Appearances in UEFA Champions League)	0	–		29	15
Djurgårdens IF	Total		48	26	9	4	–		8	1	–		65	31
Rennes	2003–04	Ligue 1	18	7	3	0	–	–	–		–		21	7
Rennes	2004–05	Ligue 1	31	5	1	0	1	1	–		–		33	6
Rennes	2005–06	Ligue 1	34	8	5	1	0	0	4	0	–		43	9
Rennes	Total		83	20	9	1	1	1	4	0	–		97	22
Lyon	2006–07	Ligue 1	33	3	3	0	4	0	6	1	1 (Note: Appearance in Trophée des Champions)	0	47	4
Lyon	2007–08	Ligue 1	37	5	6	0	2	0	8	1	1	0	54	6
Lyon	2008–09	Ligue 1	32	2	2	0	1	0	6	0	1	0	42	2
Lyon	2009–10	Ligue 1	32	4	2	0	0	0	13	1	–		47	5
Lyon	2010–11	Ligue 1	33	3	2	0	1	0	5	0	–		40	3
Lyon	2011–12	Ligue 1	32	0	6	1	4	1	9	0	–		51	2
Lyon	Total		199	17	21	1	12	1	47	3	3	0	282	22
Spartak Moscow	2012–13	Russian Premier League	20	2	1	0	–		6	0	–		27	2
Spartak Moscow	2013–14	Russian Premier League	10	1	1	0	–		1 (Note: Appearance(s) in UEFA Europa League)	0	–		12	1
Spartak Moscow	2014–15	Russian Premier League	28	2	0	0	–		–		–		28	2
Spartak Moscow	Total		58	5	2	0	–		7	0	–		67	5
Arsenal (loan)	2013–14	Premier League	3	0	1	0	–		0	0	–		4	0
Grasshoppers	2015–16	Swiss Super League	33	1	2	0	–		–		–		35	1
Grasshoppers	2016–17	Swiss Super League	16	0	1	0	–		4	0	–		21	0
Grasshoppers	Total		49	1	3	0	–		4	0	–		56	1
Djurgårdens IF	2017	Allsvenskan	28	3	3	0	–		–		–		31	3
Career total			537	86	54	8	13	2	70	4	3	0	677	100

=== International ===
Appearances and goals by national team and year
National team	Year	Apps	Goals
Sweden	2001	2	0
Sweden	2002	5	0
Sweden	2003	7	1
Sweden	2004	10	1
Sweden	2005	7	2
Sweden	2006	12	2
Sweden	2007	9	2
Sweden	2008	10	3
Sweden	2009	9	2
Sweden	2010	7	0
Sweden	2011	11	3
Sweden	2012	9	0
Sweden	2013	10	0
Sweden	2014	8	0
Sweden	2015	9	0
Sweden	2016	6	0
Total		131	16

Scores and results list Sweden's goal tally first, score column indicates score after each Källström goal.

List of international goals scored by Kim Källström
No.	Date	Venue	Opponent	Score	Result	Competition
1	6 September 2003	Ullevi, Gothenburg, Sweden	San Marino	4–0	5–0	UEFA Euro 2004 qualifying
2	28 April 2004	Estádio Cidade de Coimbra, Coimbra, Portugal	Portugal	1–0	2–2	Friendly
3	8 June 2005	Råsunda, Solna, Sweden	Norway	1–0	2–3	Friendly
4	12 October 2005	Råsunda, Solna, Sweden	Iceland	3–1	3–1	2006 FIFA World Cup qualifying
5	2 September 2006	Skonto Stadium, Riga, Latvia	Latvia	1–0	1–0	UEFA Euro 2008 qualifying
6	11 October 2006	Laugardalsvöllur, Reykjavik, Iceland	Iceland	1–1	2–1	UEFA Euro 2008 qualifying
7	22 August 2007	Ullevi, Gothenburg, Sweden	United States	1–0	1–0	Friendly
8	21 November 2007	Råsunda, Solna, Sweden	Latvia	2–1	2–1	UEFA Euro 2008 qualifying
9	20 August 2008	Ullevi, Gothenburg, Sweden	France	2–3	2–3	Friendly
10	10 September 2008	Råsunda, Solna, Sweden	Hungary	1–0	2–1	2010 FIFA World Cup qualifying
11	19 November 2008	Amsterdam ArenA, Amsterdam, the Netherlands	Netherlands	1–2	1–3	Friendly
12	11 February 2009	UPC-Arena, Graz, Austria	Austria	2–0	2–0	Friendly
13	10 June 2009	Ullevi, Gothenburg, Sweden	Malta	1–0	4–0	2010 FIFA World Cup qualifying
14	7 June 2011	Råsunda, Solna, Sweden	Finland	1–0	5–0	UEFA Euro 2012 qualifying
15	6 September 2011	Stadio Olimpico, Serravalle, San Marino	San Marino	1–0	5–0	UEFA Euro 2012 qualifying
16	11 October 2011	Råsunda, Solna, Sweden	Netherlands	1–0	3–2	UEFA Euro 2012 qualifying

== Honours ==
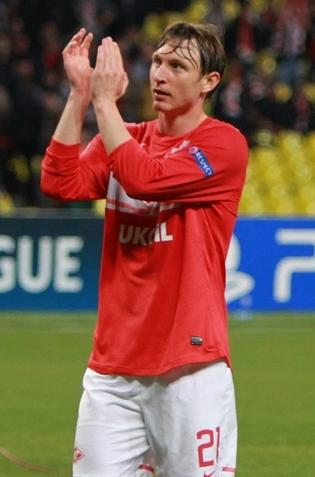
Källström with Spartak Moscow in 2012

BK Häcken

- Division 1 Södra: 1999

Djurgården

- Allsvenskan: 2002, 2003
- Svenska Cupen: 2002

Lyon

- Ligue 1: 2006–07, 2007–08
- Coupe de France: 2007–08, 2011–12
- Trophée Des Champions: 2006, 2007

Arsenal

- FA Cup: 2013–14

Individual

- Årets komet: 2000
- Swedish Newcomer of the Year: 2000
- Årets Järnkamin: 2002
- Swedish Midfielder of the Year: 2009, 2011, 2012
- Swedish Goal of the Year: 2011
- UEFA Euro 2012 qualifying top assist provider
- Swiss Super League Team of the Year: 2015–16
- Allsvenskan Player of the Month: September 2017

== See also ==
- List of men's footballers with 100 or more international caps
