= Rami Shaaban =

Swedish association football player (born 1975)

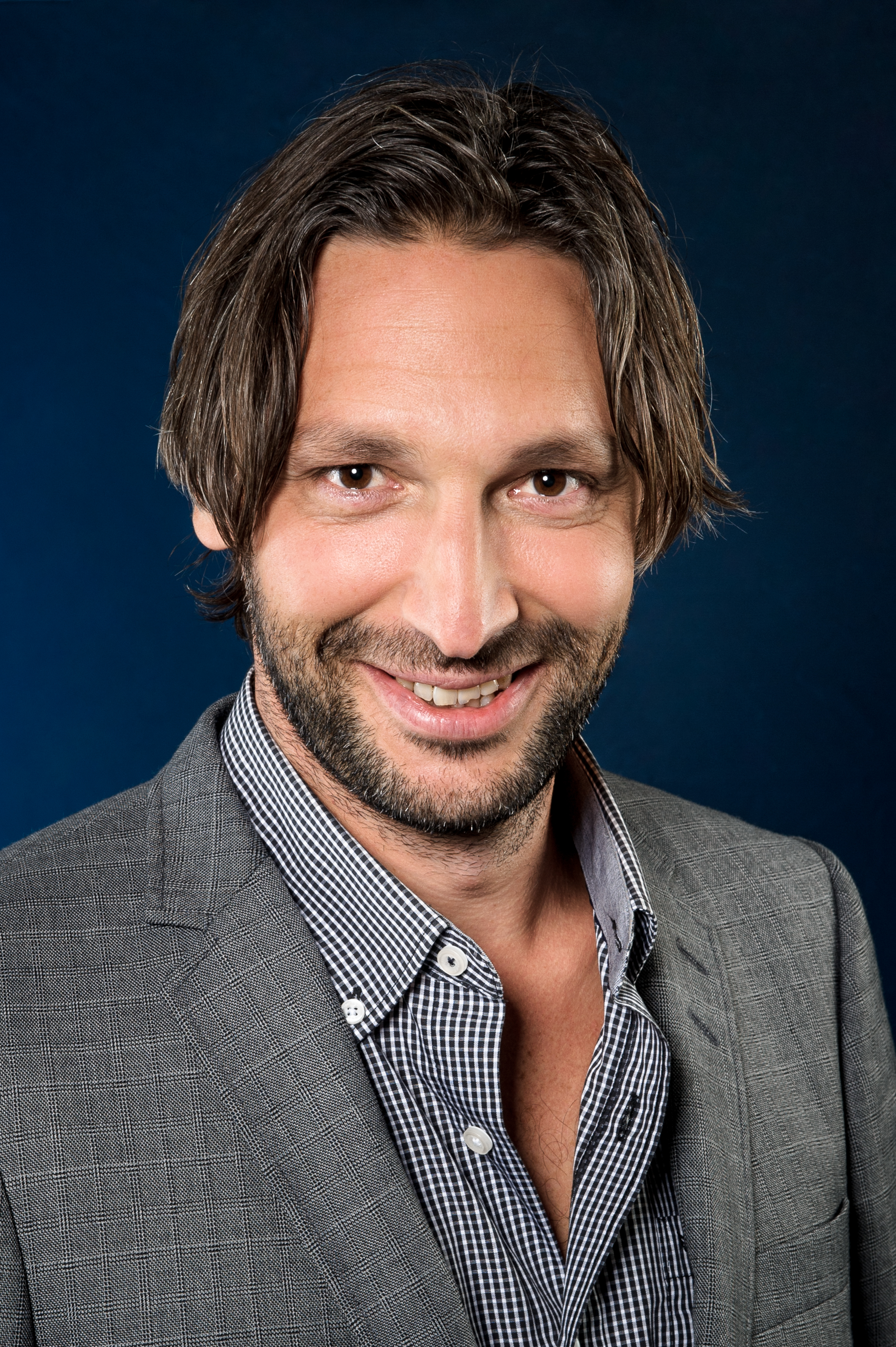
- Shaaban in 2014

Personal information
- Full name: Rami Shaaban
- Date of birth: 30 June 1975 (age 51)
- Place of birth: Solna, Sweden
- Height: 1.93 m (6 ft 4 in)
- Position: Goalkeeper

Youth career
- Fisksätra IF
- Järla IF
- –1993: Nacka FF

Senior career*
Years	Team	Apps	(Gls)
1994–1995	Saltsjöbadens IF	39	(0)
1995	Zamalek	4	(0)
1995–1996	Ittihad Othman	5	(0)
1997–1999	Nacka FF	48	(0)
1999–2002	Djurgårdens IF	40	(0)
2001	→ Värtans IK (loan)	2	(0)
2002–2004	Arsenal	3	(0)
2004	→ West Ham United (loan)	0	(0)
2005	Brighton & Hove Albion	6	(0)
2006–2008	Fredrikstad	43	(0)
2008–2012	Hammarby IF	26	(0)
Total		216	(0)

International career
2006–2008	Sweden	16	(0)
- * Club domestic league appearances and goals

Rami Shaaban (Arabic: رامي شعبان; born 30 June 1975) is a Swedish former professional footballer who played as goalkeeper. During a career that spanned between 1994 and 2012, he is best remembered for representing Djurgårdens IF, Arsenal, Fredrikstad, and Hammarby IF. A full international between 2006 and 2008, he won 16 caps for the Sweden national team and represented his country at the 2006 FIFA World Cup and UEFA Euro 2008.

== Early life ==
Shaaban was born in Solna, Stockholm. He is the son of an Egyptian father and a Finnish mother.

== Club career ==
=== Early career ===
Shaaban started his senior career at local club Saltsjöbadens IF before moving to Cairo to play for Zamalek and Ittihad Osman, while also studying at university. Following his time in Egypt, Shaaban returned to Sweden in 1997 and joined Nacka FF, a club based close to where he grew up. After a string of impressive performances, he was asked to join Swedish Allsvenskan outfit Djurgården where he spent two seasons. In August 2002, Shaaban earned a move to Arsenal.

=== Arsenal ===
In August 2002, Shaaban joined Arsenal as a potential replacement for David Seaman. When Seaman was injured, Shaaban played in two matches in the UEFA Champions League at home against PSV and away against Roma, as well as in three matches in the Premier League, including a North London Derby victory against rivals Tottenham Hotspur. Shaaban broke his leg during training on Christmas Eve 2002, ultimately sidelining himself for the rest of the season. When Seaman left Arsenal in the summer of 2003 Arsène Wenger signed Jens Lehmann, who played every match that season as Arsenal went undefeated for the entire 2003–04 league season. Shaaban was plagued by injuries and failed to become Arsenal's first-choice keeper. In January 2004, Shaaban was loaned to West Ham United for a month, but did not make any appearances for the Hammers. He returned to Arsenal after his loan spell and due to an injury to Stuart Taylor he was on the bench for a number of league games as Arsenal completed their Invincibles season. He was released by Arsenal at the end of that season.

=== Other clubs ===
In February 2005, he signed for Brighton & Hove Albion on non-contract terms, making his debut in a 2–1 victory over Sunderland, and signed a short-term contract lasting until the end of the season days later. After his contract expired he was released on a free transfer and had a trial at Dundee United, playing his only match as United beat Sheffield Wednesday to win the City of Discovery Cup. He also had a trial at Bristol City. However, Shaaban could not agree terms and was snapped up by Fredrikstad FK.

=== Hammarby IF and retirement ===
On 12 February 2008, Shaaban signed a five-year contract with Swedish team Hammarby IF. In 2012, he announced his retirement from professional football.

== International career ==
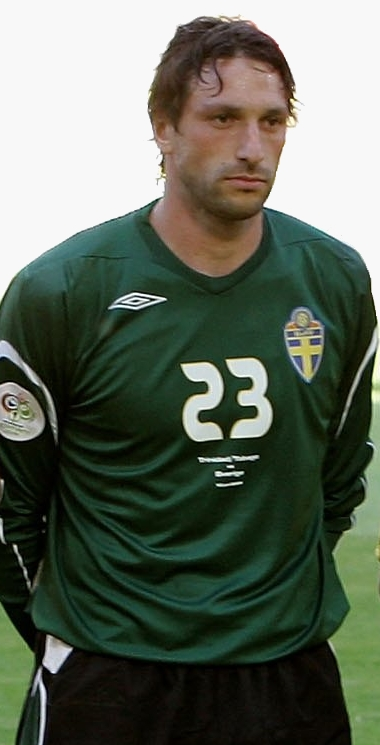
Shaaban lining up for Sweden at the 2006 FIFA World Cup

In 2002, shortly after his move to Arsenal, Shaaban was linked to be called up by the Egypt national football team, however this never materialised. Shaaban was called up to the Sweden squad for the 2006 World Cup, although he did not have an international cap to his name. He made his debut in the warm up game with Finland as a substitute, coming on for 45 minutes and keeping a clean sheet in a 0–0 draw. On 10 June 2006, he played in the 2006 World Cup contest against Trinidad and Tobago after starter Andreas Isaksson was hit by a shot in his face and hit the ground with his head two days before the match.

He also played four games in the Euro 2008 qualifiers, in which he kept a vital clean sheet against Spain national football team, and was also a member of the nation's final stage squad.

== Personal life ==
Shaaban grew up in Solna, Stockholm with a Finnish mother and an Egyptian father. As a result, he has both Swedish and Egyptian citizenship. He was raised as a Muslim. In his late teens to early twenties, Shaaban lived in Cairo, where he played football and attended university. Prior to joining Arsenal, he also worked as a mountain explosives specialist. Shaaban has one son, Gabriel, born 2002 to his ex-wife. Several years after his divorce, he began dating a makeup artist named Frida. Although they are not married, the two have a son Noah, born in August 2008. Shaaban made a move to Hammarby partly to be close to Gabriel. He currently lives in a large lake house with his son and wife. Reporters often credit Shaaban for remaining down-to-earth. Shaaban claims he has friends ranging from sheet metal workers to footballers, such as Freddie Ljungberg: Ljungberg and Shaaban remain close after becoming friends whilst at Arsenal. The two are often seen drinking coffee together. Shaaban is known for his love of coffee; he is often seen with a cup of coffee in his hand. He once said, "I dare not keep count of how many cups I drink per day. But mom is actually even worse."

== Career statistics ==
=== International ===
Appearances and goals by national team and year
National team	Year	Apps	Goals
Sweden	2006	9	0
Sweden	2007	4	0
Sweden	2008	3	0
Total		16	0

== Honours ==
Djurgårdens IF

- Allsvenskan: 2002
- Superettan: 2000
- Svenska Cupen: 2002

Fredrikstad FK

- Norwegian Football Cup: 2006

Individual

- Swedish Goalkeeper of the Year: 2006, 2007
