= Babis Stefanidis =

Swedish-Greek footballer and manager (born 1981)

Personal information
- Full name: Charalambos Stefanidis
- Date of birth: 8 March 1981 (age 45)
- Place of birth: Skellefteå, Sweden
- Height: 1.79 m (5 ft 10 in)
- Position: Midfielder

Team information
- Current team: Olympiacos Stockholm FC (manager)

Youth career
- 1987–1998: IF Brommapojkarna

Senior career*
Years	Team	Apps	(Gls)
1998–2001	Iraklis	14	(1)
2001–2004	Djurgårdens IF	62	(8)
2004–2005	Brøndby IF	15	(1)
2005–2007	Helsingborgs IF	51	(7)
2007–2009	Malmö FF	10	(0)
2009	→ Landskrona BoIS (loan)	14	(1)
2010–2011	IF Brommapojkarna	19	(1)
2012	Akropolis IF	7	(2)
Total		192	(21)

International career
2002–2004	Sweden U21	18	(4)

Managerial career
- 2013–: Olympiacos Stockholm FC
- * Club domestic league appearances and goals

Babis Stefanidis (Greek: Μπάμπης Στεφανίδης; born 8 March 1981) is a Swedish football manager and former professional footballer who played as a midfielder. He is the current manager of the Swedish team Olympiacos Stockholm FC.

== Career ==
Born in Skellefteå, Stefanidis started his career at youth level at IF Brommapojkarna and has also played for the Greek club, Iraklis. He got his senior level debut for Djurgårdens IF in 2001, and won the Swedish Allsvenskan championship with the club in 2002 and 2003. In 2004, he moved abroad to play for Danish club Brøndby IF, with whom he won the 2005 Danish Superliga championship. He moved back to Sweden in 2005 in order to join Helsingborgs IF.

On 23 July 2007, it was announced that Stefanidis had signed for Helsingborgs' rivals Malmö FF, a contract starting on 1 January 2008. However, fans of Helsingborgs IF were greatly upset and subsequent harassment and personal persecution led to Stefanidis' changing clubs prematurely, on 2 August 2007. The disappointment came from the fact that Stefanidis refused to sign a new contract with Helsingborg and thereafter switched to the main rivals.

On 27 July 2009, Stefanidis moved on loan from Malmö FF to Landskrona BoIS, in exchange for Ivo Pekalski who moved from Landskrona to Malmö. In the Winter 2009, Stefanidis moved back to play for his childhood club IF Brommapojkarna.

In February 2012, Stefanidis joined Akropolis IF in the Division 1 Norra.

== Honours ==
Djurgårdens IF

- Allsvenskan: 2002, 2003
- Svenska Cupen: 2002

Brøndby IF

- Danish Superliga: 2004–05
- Danish Cup: 2005

Helsingborgs IF

- Svenska Cupen: 2006
