= Andreas Johansson (footballer, born 1978) =

Swedish footballer (born 1978)

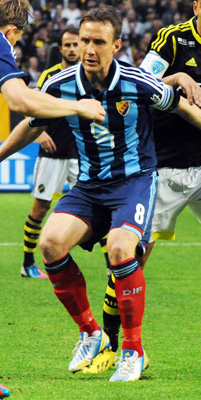
- Johansson playing for Djurgårdens IF in 2013

Personal information
- Full name: Roy Johan Andreas Johansson
- Date of birth: 5 July 1978 (age 48)
- Place of birth: Vänersborg, Sweden
- Height: 1.79 m (5 ft 10 1/2 in)
- Position: Midfielder

Senior career*
Years	Team	Apps	(Gls)
1993–1995	Melleruds IF	38	(11)
1996–1998	Degerfors IF	56	(10)
1999	AIK	12	(1)
2000–2005	Djurgårdens IF	124	(45)
2005–2007	Wigan Athletic	29	(4)
2007–2010	AaB	93	(21)
2010–2012	OB	69	(10)
2013–2014	Djurgårdens IF	48	(5)
Total		469	(107)

International career
1993	Sweden U17	2	(0)
1997–1999	Sweden U21	5	(0)
2002–2008	Sweden	16	(0)
- * Club domestic league appearances and goals

Roy Johan Andreas Johansson (Swedish pronunciation: [anˈdreːas ˈjuːhanˌsɔn]; born 5 July 1978) is a Swedish former professional footballer who played as a midfielder. He got his breakthrough with the Swedish team Djurgårdens IF, winning two Allsvenskan championships and two Swedish Cup trophies. He later played for Premier League team Wigan Athletic, before joining AaB with whom he won the Danish Superliga and was named team captain. A full international between 2002 and 2008, he won 16 caps for the Sweden national team.

== Club career ==
=== Early career ===
His career began at Melleruds IF, where he played for three seasons. During this time he played 38 times, scoring 11 goals. It was scoring 10 of these in the final season that prompted Degerfors IF to sign him for the beginning of the 1996 season. Again, he spent three years at the club, regularly securing a place in the team and a modest supply goals. Having moved out of favour with the team at the back end of the 1998 season, he had an unsuccessful spell at AIK, appearing only 12 times in the league, five of these as a sub.

=== Djurgårdens IF ===
In 2000, he moved to Djurgårdens IF, for whom he played until 2004, during which time he saw them claim the Allsvenskan championship in 2002 and 2003, as well as the Swedish Cup in 2002 and 2004. In total he scored 45 goals for Djurgården in 124 appearances.

=== Wigan Athletic ===
He moved to Wigan Athletic at the beginning of calendar year 2005, under manager Paul Jewell. His first appearance in the Wigan team came against Stoke City in February 2005, as a substitute replacement for Gary Teale. This would be his only game of the 2004–05 season. He had a successful 2005–06 Football League Cup, as he scored two extra time goals against Watford and helped Wigan reach the final. He played 16 games during the 2005–06 FA Premier League season, and scored goals against Bolton Wanderers, Tottenham Hotspur (2) and Birmingham City. In the last game of that season, Johansson came on against Arsenal at Highbury and got sent off without touching the ball after tackling fellow country man Freddie Ljungberg in the penalty box, allowing Thierry Henry to score the last goal at the old ground on a penalty kick. He played 12 games during the 2005–06 FA Premier League season, and was released from his Wigan contract in summer 2007 by manager Chris Hutchings.

=== AaB and OB ===
Johansson was quickly snapped up by Danish Superliga club AaB on 17 July 2007. At AaB, he quickly established himself as a playmaking midfielder. With seven goals in 31 games, he led AaB to the 2007–08 Danish Superliga championship, the first AaB championship since 1999. He helped the team reach the group stage of the 2008–09 UEFA Champions League tournament, and scored in the 3–6 defeat to Villarreal CF. AaB finished third in their group, and moved on to the 2008–09 UEFA Cup, where Johansson scored in the aggregate 6–1 defeat of Deportivo La Coruña. He and AaB also reached the 2009 Danish Cup Final, but lost 0–1 to Copenhagen. Following the sale of Thomas Augustinussen, Johansson was named new AaB team captain in July 2009. With eight goals in 32 games he was the AaB top goalscorer of the 2009–10 Danish Superliga season. As his contract expired in the summer 2010, AaB did not have the financial means to extend it.

In June 2010, Johansson signed with Odense Boldklub on a free transfer.

=== Return to Djurgården and retirement ===
He scored his first goal in his second spell for Djurgårdens IF in Allsvenskan on 12 May 2013 in the 3–2 victory against Malmö FF. Johansson retired from professional football after the 2014 Allsvenskan season.

== International ==
=== Youth ===
Johansson started his international career with the Swedish youth selections, including five games for the Sweden national under-21 football team.

=== Senior ===
On 7 September 2002, Johansson made his full international debut for the Sweden men's national football team in a UEFA Euro 2004 qualifier against Latvia, replacing Magnus Svensson in the 79th minute of a 0–0 draw. He was called up for the Swedish squad at the 2003 King's Cup, and was a part of the national team during spring 2004, playing his 12th national team game. He was not selected for the 2004 European Championship, and was dropped from the national team during his initial time at Wigan. He was once more a part of the Swedish team in the February 2007 game against Egypt, and played his 13th national team game. While at AaB, he was called up for the Swedish squad to replace Freddie Ljungberg in September 2007. He played his 16th and last national team game in January 2008, before he was dropped from the team again. He impressed Swedish manager Lars Lagerbäck in his Champions League games for AaB, and was called up once more in September 2008, but did not play. Johansson's favored position as an offensive central midfielder did not exist in Lagerbäck's rigid 4–4–2 system, and Johansson's international career suffered as a result.

== Career statistics ==
As of match played 5 September 2014.

=== Club ===
Club	Season	League			Cup		League Cup		Europe		Other		Total	
Club	Season	Division	Apps	Goals	Apps	Goals	Apps	Goals	Apps	Goals	Apps	Goals	Apps	Goals
Mellerud	1993	Division 2 Västra Götaland	2	0			—		—		—		2	0
Mellerud	1994	Division 2 Västra Götaland	15	1			—		—		—		15	1
Mellerud	1995	Division 2 Västra Götaland	21	10			—		—		—		21	10
Mellerud	Total		38	11			—		—		—		38	11
Degerfors	1996	Allsvenskan	10	1			—		—				10	1
Degerfors	1997	Allsvenskan	23	4			—		—				23	4
Degerfors	1998	Division 1 Norra	23	5			—		—				23	5
Degerfors	Total		56	10			—		—				56	10
AIK	1999	Allsvenskan	12	1	3	0	—		1	0			16	1
AIK	Total		12	1	3	0	—		1	0			16	1
Djurgården	2000	Superettan	24	7	2	1	—		—				26	8
Djurgården	2001	Allsvenskan	25	5	2	1	—		—				27	6
Djurgården	2002	Allsvenskan	26	10	6	2	—		6	0			38	12
Djurgården	2003	Allsvenskan	26	12	4	3	—		2	1			32	16
Djurgården	2004	Allsvenskan	23	11	5	4	—		6	3	3	0	37	18
Djurgården	Total		124	45	19	11	—		14	4	3	0	160	60
Wigan	2004–05	Championship	1	0					—		—		1	0
Wigan	2005–06	Premier League	16	4	3	1	6	2	—		—		25	7
Wigan	2006–07	Premier League	12	0	1	0	1	0	—		—		14	0
Wigan	Total		29	4	4	1	7	2	—		—		40	7
AaB	2007–08	Superligaen	31	7			—		10	3			41	10
AaB	2008–09	Superligaen	30	6			—		13	3			43	9
AaB	2009–10	Superligaen	32	8			—		2	1			34	9
AaB	Total		93	21	0	0	—		25	7	0	0	118	28
OB	2010–11	Superligaen	28	4	1	0	—		8	1			37	5
OB	2011–12	Superligaen	24	4			—		10	2			34	6
OB	2012–13	Superligaen	17	2	2	1	—						19	3
OB	Total		69	10	3	1	—		18	3	0	0	90	14
Djurgården	2013	Allsvenskan	27	4	7	2	—		—		—		34	6
Djurgården	2014	Allsvenskan	21	1	4	3	—		—		—		25	4
Djurgården	Total		48	5	11	5	—		—		—		59	10
Career total			469	107	40	18	7	2	58	14	3	0	570	139

=== International ===
Appearances and goals by national team and year
National team	Year	Apps	Goals
Sweden	2002	2	0
Sweden	2003	8	0
Sweden	2004	2	0
Sweden	2005	0	0
Sweden	2006	0	0
Sweden	2007	3	0
Sweden	2008	1	0
Total		16	0

== Honours ==
AIK

- Svenska Cupen: 1998–99

Djurgården

- Allsvenskan: 2002, 2003
- Superettan: 2000
- Svenska Cupen: 2002, 2004 runner up: 2012–13

Wigan Athletic

- Football League Cup runner-up: 2005–06

AaB

- Danish Superliga: 2007–08

Sweden

- King's Cup: 2003
