= Nacka FF (1990) =

Football club in Nacka, Sweden

Nacka Fotbollsförening was a Swedish football team from Nacka, Stockholm County that was founded in 1990. Nacka FF played in Division 1. It went bankrupt in 2001.

== Managers ==
- Sören Åkeby

== Players ==
- Rami Shaaban
