= Sören Åkeby =

Swedish footballer and manager

Personal information
- Full name: Nils Sören Åkeby
- Date of birth: 23 February 1952 (age 74)
- Place of birth: Stockholm, Sweden

Team information
- Current team: Assyriska FF (manager)

Senior career*
Years	Team	Apps	(Gls)
1962–1972	Hammarby IF		
1972–1979	Essinge IK		

Managerial career
- 1981–1982: Essinge IK (assistant)
- 1982–1983: Örby IS
- 1984–1985: Essinge IK
- 1986–1988: Gröndals IK
- 1989–1990: Älvsjö AIK
- 1991–1993: Djurgårdens IF (youth team)
- 1994: AIK (assistant)
- 1995–1998: Nacka FF
- 1999: Östersunds FK
- 1999–2003: Djurgårdens IF
- 2003–2005: AGF Aarhus
- 2006–2007: Malmö FF
- 2008: Aalesunds FK
- 2008–2012: GIF Sundsvall
- 2013: IFK Värnamo
- 2014: Assyriska FF
- * Club domestic league appearances and goals

Sören Åkeby (born 23 February 1952) is a Swedish football manager and former player.

== Career ==
Along with Zoran Lukić, Åkeby managed Djurgårdens IF from 1999 to 2003. The two were very successful during the first years of the 21st century winning the Allsvenskan in 2002 and 2003. During the 2008 season he managed the Norwegian team of Aalesunds FK, but was fired in September 2008. On 2 October the same year GIF Sundsvall announced that Sören Åkeby would be the new manager of the club.

== Honours ==
Djurgårdens IF

- Superettan: 2000
- Allsvenskan: 2002, 2003
- Svenska Cupen: 2002

=== Individual ===
- Swedish Manager of the Year: 2002, 2003
