= Partille IF =

Swedish football club

- Full name: Partille Idrottsförening
- Founded: 1924
- Ground: Lexby IP; Partille; Sweden
- Chairman: Denny Bågenholm
- Head coach: Kim Roland
- Coach: Daniel Pintaric
- League: Division 4 Göteborg A
- 2021: Division 4 Göteborg A
Home colours	Away colours

Partille IF is a Swedish football club located in Partille in Västra Götaland County.

== Background ==
Partille Idrottsförening is a sports club which was founded in 1924. The club currently has sections for football and handball.

Since their foundation Partille IF has participated mainly in the middle and lower divisions of the Swedish football league system. The club currently plays in Division 4 Göteborg A which is the sixth tier of Swedish football. They play their home matches at the Lexby IP in Partille.

Partille IF are affiliated to Göteborgs Fotbollförbund.

== Recent history ==
In recent seasons Partille IF have competed in the following divisions:

2011 – Division III, Mellersta Götaland
2010 – Division IV, Göteborg A
2009 – Division IV, Göteborg A
2008 – Division IV, Göteborg A
2007 – Division IV, Göteborg A
2006 – Division IV, Göteborg A
2005 – Division V, Göteborg A
2004 – Division VI, Göteborg A
2003 – Division VI, Göteborg A
2002 – Division VI, Göteborg A
2001 – Division VI, Göteborg A
2000 – Division VI, Göteborg A
1999 – Division VI, Göteborg A

== Attendances ==
In recent seasons Partille IF have had the following average attendances:

Season	Average attendance	Division / Section	Level
2009	Not available	Div 4 Göteborg A	Tier 6
2010		Div 4 Göteborg A	Tier 6

* Attendances are provided in the Publikliga sections of the Svenska Fotbollförbundet website.
