= 2002 in Swedish football =

The 2002 season in Swedish football, starting January 2002 and ending December 2002:

== Honours ==
=== Official titles ===
Title	Team	Reason
Swedish Champions 2002	Djurgårdens IF	Winners of Allsvenskan
Swedish Cup Champions 2002	Djurgårdens IF	Winners of Svenska Cupen

=== Competitions ===
Level	Competition	Team
1st level	Allsvenskan 2002	Djurgårdens IF
2nd level	Superettan 2002	Östers IF
Cup	Svenska Cupen 2002	Djurgårdens IF

== Promotions, relegations and qualifications ==
=== Promotions ===
Promoted from	Promoted to	Team	Reason
Superettan 2002	Allsvenskan 2003	Östers IF	Winners
Superettan 2002	Allsvenskan 2003	Enköpings SK	2nd team
Division 2 2002	Superettan 2003	Bodens BK	Winners of promotion play-off
Division 2 2002	Superettan 2003	Falkenbergs FF	Winners of promotion play-off
Division 2 2002	Superettan 2003	BK Forward	Winners of promotion play-off

=== Relegations ===
Relegated from	Relegated to	Team	Reason
Allsvenskan 2002	Superettan 2003	IFK Norrköping	13th team
Allsvenskan 2002	Superettan 2003	Kalmar FF	14th team
Superettan 2002	Division 2 2003	IK Brage	14th team
Superettan 2002	Division 2 2003	Ängelholms FF	15th team
Superettan 2002	Division 2 2003	Mjällby AIF	16th team

=== International qualifications ===
Qualified for	Enters	Team	Reason
UEFA Champions League 2003–04	2nd qualifying round	Djurgårdens IF	Winners of Allsvenskan
UEFA Cup 2003–04	Qualifying round	Malmö FF	2nd team in Allsvenskan
UEFA Cup 2003–04	Qualifying round	AIK	Runners-up of Svenska Cupen
UEFA Intertoto Cup 2003	1st round	Örgryte IS	3rd team in Allsvenskan

== Domestic results ==
=== Allsvenskan ===
Pos	Team	Pld	W	D	L	GF	GA	GD	Pts	Qualification or relegation
1	Djurgårdens IF (C)	26	16	4	6	51	33	+18	52	Qualification to Champions League second qualifying round
2	Malmö FF	26	14	4	8	52	32	+20	46	Qualification to UEFA Cup qualifying round
3	Örgryte IS	26	12	8	6	49	38	+11	44	Qualification to Intertoto Cup first round
4	Helsingborgs IF	26	10	8	8	38	38	0	38	
5	AIK	26	9	10	7	35	38	−3	37	Qualification to UEFA Cup qualifying round (Note: AIK qualified for the UEFA Cup as Svenska Cupen runners-up 2002.)
6	Halmstads BK	26	8	12	6	35	28	+7	36	
7	Örebro SK	26	9	8	9	32	39	−7	35	
8	GIF Sundsvall	26	8	9	9	29	35	−6	33	
9	Hammarby IF	26	8	8	10	43	42	+1	32	
10	IF Elfsborg	26	8	8	10	25	31	−6	32	
11	Landskrona BoIS	26	8	6	12	41	39	+2	30	
12	IFK Göteborg (O)	26	8	4	14	25	39	−14	28	Qualification to Relegation play-offs
13	IFK Norrköping (R)	26	6	9	11	37	40	−3	27	Relegation to Superettan
14	Kalmar FF (R)	26	6	6	14	20	40	−20	24	Relegation to Superettan

Source: svenskfotboll.se (in Swedish)
Rules for classification: 1) points; 2) goal difference; 3) number of goals scored.
(C) Champions; (O) Play-off winners; (R) Relegated

=== 2002 Allsvenskan qualification play-off ===
6 November 2002

Västra Frölunda IF	1–1	IFK Göteborg

?, Gothenburg
10 November 2002

IFK Göteborg	2–0	Västra Frölunda IF

?, Gothenburg

=== Superettan ===
Pos	Team	Pld	W	D	L	GF	GA	GD	Pts	Promotion, qualification or relegation
1	Östers IF (C, P)	30	16	6	8	61	35	+26	54	Promotion to Allsvenskan
2	Enköpings SK (P)	30	15	7	8	55	43	+12	52	Promotion to Allsvenskan
3	Västra Frölunda	30	14	9	7	54	33	+21	51	Qualification to Promotion playoffs
4	BK Häcken	30	14	9	7	52	33	+19	51	
5	Assyriska FF	30	12	9	9	36	27	+9	45	
6	Café Opera United	30	12	8	10	48	45	+3	44	
7	IFK Malmö	30	12	6	12	34	34	0	42	
8	Västerås SK	30	12	5	13	49	49	0	41	
9	Trelleborgs FF	30	10	9	11	42	41	+1	39	
10	Åtvidabergs FF	30	9	10	11	31	50	−19	37	
11	Gefle IF	30	9	8	13	45	47	−2	35	
12	IF Brommapojkarna	30	9	8	13	40	52	−12	35	
13	IF Sylvia	30	9	8	13	37	55	−18	35	
14	IK Brage (R)	30	8	10	12	49	55	−6	34	Relegation to Division 2
15	Ängelholms FF (R)	30	9	7	14	29	45	−16	34	Relegation to Division 2
16	Mjällby AIF (R)	30	8	5	17	42	60	−18	29	Relegation to Division 2

Source: svenskfotboll.se (in Swedish)
Rules for classification: 1) points; 2) goal difference; 3) number of goals scored.
(C) Champions; (P) Promoted; (R) Relegated

=== 2002 Svenska Cupen ===
Final

November 9, 2002

Djurgårdens IF	0–0 1–0 (agg)	AIK

Råsunda, Solna
