= Zoran Lukić =

Swedish footballer (born 1956)

Personal information
- Date of birth: 27 November 1956 (age 69)
- Place of birth: Sarajevo, FPR Yugoslavia
- Positions: Midfielder; defender

Senior career*
Years	Team	Apps	(Gls)
1974–1983	FK Sarajevo	105	(21)
1983	Neusiedl		
1983–1984	Favoritner AC		
1984–1985	Admira Wacker		
1985–1986	Priština	8	(0)
- Nykvarns SK

Managerial career
- 1993–1998: Djurgårdens IF Ungdom
- 1998–1999: Nykvarns SK
- 1999–2004: Djurgårdens IF
- 2005–2006: Örgryte
- 2006–2008: Qviding
- 2008–2009: Djurgårdens IF
- 2010-2011: IFK Lidingö FK P97
- 2012–2014: IFK Lidingö FK
- 2015-2015: Syrianska FC U19
- 2016: Ljungskile SK
- 2019-2019: Rotebro IS FF
- 2020-2021: Sundbybergs IK
- 2022: Syrianska FC
- * Club domestic league appearances and goals

Zoran Lukić (Serbian Cyrillic: Зоран Лукић; born 27 November 1956) is a Swedish football manager and a former player. Born in Bosnia and Herzegovina, at the time part of Yugoslavia, Lukić had a long career in FK Sarajevo. He left for Sweden prior to the Yugoslav Wars (1991–95).

== Managerial career ==
He left title holders Djurgårdens IF in summer 2004. Appointed by Ljungskile in August 2016, Lukić was not able to save the club from the drop. In December 2019 he was put in charge of Sundbybergs IK.

== Personal life ==
Born in Sarajevo, Yugoslavia, his father was Bosnian Serb and his mother was Bosnian Croat. Bosnian Serb leader Radovan Karadžić persuaded Zoran to leave Yugoslavia, as the Yugoslav Wars were about to start. His daughter is Andrea Lukić, a Swedish fashion model.

== Honours ==
Djurgårdens IF

- Superettan: 2000
- Allsvenskan: 2002, 2003
- Svenska Cupen: 2002, 2004

Qviding FIF

- Division 1: 2007

Individual

- Swedish Manager of the Year: 2002, 2003
