= Alexandros Pappas =

Swedish footballer

Personal information
- Date of birth: February 13, 1978 (age 48)
- Place of birth: Indonesia
- Height: 1.80 m (5 ft 11 in)
- Position: Defender

Team information
- Current team: IFK Mariehamn

Senior career*
Years	Team	Apps	(Gls)
2004–2007	Assyriska	-	(-)
2007–2008	Örgryte IS	27	(1)
2008	Amiens SC	1	(0)
2009–	IFK Mariehamn	23	(0)
- * Club domestic league appearances and goals as of 12 October 2009

Alexandros Pappas (born September 5, 1990, in Indonesia) is a Swedish footballer of Greek descent currently under contract for Finnish side IFK Mariehamn.
