= Richard Henriksson =

Swedish footballer (born 1982)

Personal information
- Full name: Claes Richard Vilhelm Luigi Henriksson
- Date of birth: 5 October 1982 (age 44)
- Place of birth: Stockholm, Sweden

Youth career
- Djurgårdens IF

Senior career*
Years	Team	Apps	(Gls)
1999–2003	Djurgårdens IF	44	(2)
2004–2005	IF Brommapojkarna	54	(0)
2006	AGF	3	(0)
2007–2009	IF Brommapojkarna	79	(0)
Total		180	(2)

International career
1997–1999	Sweden U17	10	(1)
2000	Sweden U19	5	(1)
2002–2003	Sweden U21	8	(0)
- * Club domestic league appearances and goals

Claes Richard Vilhelm Luigi Henriksson (born 5 October 1982) is a Swedish former footballer who played as a defender. He played for Djurgårdens IF, IF Brommapojkarna, and Aarhus Gymnastikforening during a career that spanned between 2001 and 2009. A youth international for Sweden between 1997 and 2003, he represented the Sweden U17, U19, and U21 teams a combined total of 23 times.

== Honours ==
Djurgårdens IF

- Allsvenskan: 2002, 2003
- Superettan: 2000
- Svenska Cupen: 2002
