= Jonas Stark =

Swedish footballer (born 1972)

Personal information
- Full name: Pär Jonas Stark
- Date of birth: 27 April 1972 (age 54)
- Place of birth: Gävle, Sweden
- Height: 1.86 m (6 ft 1 in)
- Position: Centre back

Youth career
- IK Sätra

Senior career*
Years	Team	Apps	(Gls)
1991–1998	Gefle IF		
1999–2004	Hammarby IF	110	(6)
2004	→ BK Frem (loan)	10	(0)
2004–2008	Västerås SK		
- * Club domestic league appearances and goals

Jonas Stark (born 27 April 1972 in Gävle) is a Swedish former football defender.

== Honours ==
Hammarby

- Allsvenskan (1): 2001
