= Stefan Bärlin =

Swedish footballer

Personal information
- Full name: Stefan Bärlin
- Date of birth: 31 May 1976 (age 50)
- Height: 1.82 m (6 ft 0 in)
- Position: Midfielder

Youth career
- Katrineholms SK

Senior career*
Years	Team	Apps	(Gls)
1994–1997	Västerås SK	72	(18)
1998–1999	IFK Göteborg	40	(3)
2000–2003	Djurgårdens IF	64	(15)
2003–2004	Västerås SK	58	(36)
2005–2007	IK Start	54	(10)
2007–2008	Odd Grenland	22	(11)
2008–2011	Västerås SK	41	(6)
- * Club domestic league appearances and goals

Stefan Bärlin (born 31 May 1976) is a Swedish former footballer. He made 37 Allsvenskan appearances for Djurgårdens IF and scored six goals.

== Honours ==
Djurgårdens IF

- Allsvenskan: 2002

Individual

- Superettan top scorer: 2004
