= Johan Wallinder =

Swedish football manager and former player

Personal information
- Date of birth: 19 August 1975 (age 51)
- Position: Forward

Senior career*
Years	Team	Apps	(Gls)
1996–1999	Örebro SK	77	(10)
2000	Helsingborgs IF	10	(0)
2000	Örebro SK	11	(7)
2001–2002	Djurgården	21	(3)
2002	Örebro SK	14	(3)
2003	Enköpings SK FK	23	(1)
2004	FC Cafe Opera		
2005–2006	Panetolikos		
- * Club domestic league appearances and goals

Johan Wallinder (born 19 August 1975) is a Swedish former professional footballer who played as forward. Wallinder was part of the Djurgården Swedish champions' team of 2002.

== Honours ==
Djurgårdens IF

- Allsvenskan: 2002
