= Louay Chanko =

Syrian-Swedish footballer and manager (born 1979)

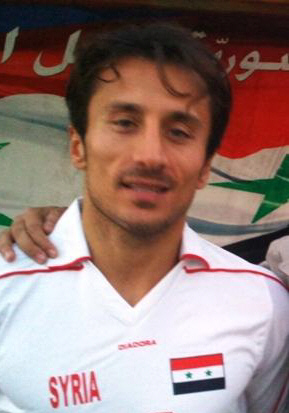
- Chanko with Syria in 2010

Personal information
- Full name: Louay Chanko
- Date of birth: 29 November 1979 (age 46)
- Place of birth: Södertälje, Sweden
- Height: 1.73 m (5 ft 8 in)
- Position: Midfielder

Senior career*
Years	Team	Apps	(Gls)
1996–2000	Syrianska FC	18	(0)
2000–2003	Djurgårdens IF	45	(10)
2003–2005	Malmö FF	60	(2)
2005–2006	AEK Athens	21	(1)
2006–2009	Hammarby	72	(7)
2009–2012	AaB	59	(3)
2012–2017	Syrianska FC	102	(4)
2017	Västerås SK	0	(0)
Total		377	(26)

International career
2008	Sweden	1	(0)
2008–2013	Syria	7	(0)

Managerial career
- 2017–2018: Eskişehirspor (assistant)
- 2018: Arameisk-Syrianska IF
- 2026–: Nacka FC
- * Club domestic league appearances and goals

Louay Chanko (Arabic: لؤي شنكو; born 29 November 1979) is a professional football manager and former player.

Born in Sweden, Chanko represented Sweden internationally as a midfielder, before switching allegiance to Syria. After his playing career, Chanko has worked as a manager.

== Club career ==
Chanko began his career in 1996 at Syrianska FC. In 2000 he moved to Djurgårdens IF, where he played for 3 seasons winning the Allsvenskan and the Svenska Cupen in 2002. Afterwards he signed for Malmö FF, where he won another Allsvenskan in 2004. On 3 August 2005 he was transferred to the Greek side, AEK Athens for a fee of €250,000. On 23 October, he scored a 40-yard volley in the derby against Panathinaikos, the yellow-blacks won 3–0. He failed to established himself in the squad and on 19 July 2006 he terminated his contract with the club and on 2 August Chanko returned to Sweden and joined Hammarby. After three seasons at the club he moved to AaB and in 2012 he returned to Syrianska. In 2017 Chanko moved to Västerås SK, where he ended his career.

== International career ==
In 2008, he was called up to Syria national team to play against a local league club. He received first cap for Syria at 2010 FIFA World Cup qualification against Kuwait on 8 June 2008. Earlier the same the year Chanko played for the Sweden national team in a friendly against Costa Rica.

Chanko was selected to Valeriu Tiţa's 23-man final squad for the AFC Asian Cup 2011 in Qatar. He came as a substitute in the third group game against Jordan, replacing Ali Diab in the 63rd minute.

== Honours ==
Djurgården

- Allsvenskan: 2002
- Svenska Cupen: 2002

Malmö FF

- Allsvenskan: 2004
