= Pagguy Zunda =

Swedish footballer

Personal information
- Date of birth: 23 May 1983 (age 43)
- Position: Forward

Senior career*
Years	Team	Apps	(Gls)
- Djurgården
- * Club domestic league appearances and goals

Pagguy Zunda (born 23 May 1983) is a Swedish retired footballer. Zunda was part of the Djurgården Swedish champions' team of 2002.

== Honours ==
=== Club ===
Djurgårdens IF

- Allsvenskan: 2002
