= Fotbollsgalan =

Swedish football award ceremony

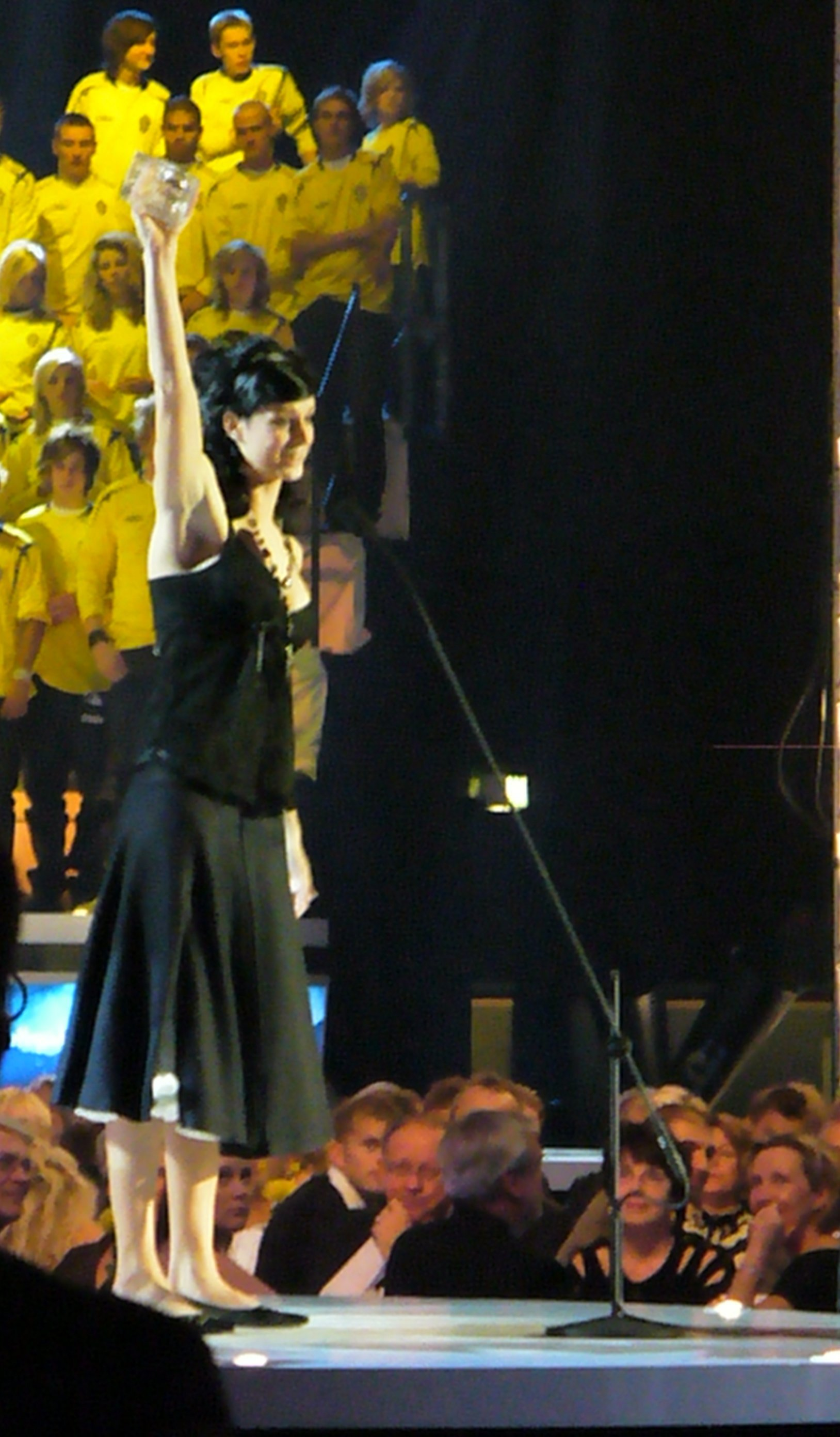
- Lotta Schelin receives the Diamantbollen during the 2006 awards
- Status: Active
- Genre: Sporting ceremony event
- Date: January
- Frequency: Annual
- Country: Sweden
- Inaugurated: 1995
- Most recent: 4 January 2024
- Website: SvenskFotboll.se

Fotbollsgalan is an official and annual Swedish sports awards ceremony honoring achievements in Swedish football. It is organised by Swedish Football Association and televised by TV4. The singer Anastacia performed the song Paid My Dues during the Gala in 2001.

== Merit categories ==
=== Current categories ===
- Guldbollen: since 1946
- Diamantbollen: since 1980
- Swedish Goalkeeper of the Year: men's since 1995; women's since 2003
- Swedish Defender of the Year: men's since 1995; women's since 2003
- Swedish Midfielder of the Year: men's since 1995; women's since 2003
- Swedish Forward of the Year: men's since 1995; women's since 2003
- Swedish Newcomer of the Year: men's since 1998; women's since 1997
- Swedish Goal of the Year: since 1995
- Swedish Manager of the Year: since 1995
- Swedish Referee of the Year: since 2005
- Allsvenskan Player of the Season: since 2009

=== Discontinued categories ===
- Folkets lirare: 1995 to 2000
- Swedish Football Personality of the Year: 2001 to 2003

== See also ==
- Allsvenskans stora pris
