= 2002 Svenska Cupen =

Tournament details
- Country: Sweden
- Teams: 98

Final positions
- Champions: Djurgårdens IF
- Runners-up: AIK

Tournament statistics
- Matches played: 97

The 2002 Svenska Cupen was the 47th season of the main Swedish football Cup. The competition started on 1 April 2002 and concluded on 9 November 2002 with the final, held at Råsunda Stadium, Solna Municipality in Stockholm County. Djurgårdens IF won the final 1–0 against AIK.

== First round ==
There were 34 matches played between 1 April and 16 April 2002. There were 68 teams in the first round from Division 1, Division 2 and Division 3, but also including a few teams from Division 4 and Division 5.

Team 1	Score	Team 2
1 April 2002
Friska Viljor FC	4–0	Robertsfors IK
10 April 2002
Bollstanäs SK	1–2	Syrianska FC
13 April 2002
IK Fyris	0–2	Essinge IK International FC
Gamla Upsala SK	2–1	Vallentuna BK
Kvarnsvedens IK	0–2	Skiljebo SK
Bunkeflo IF	1–0	Högaborgs BK
Habo IF	1–3	Lundens AIS
Holmalunds IF	0–1	IK Oddevold
VoIF Diana	0–8	BK Forward
IF Lödde	0–2	IFK Hässleholm
AIK Atlas	0–3	Myresjö IF
Stavstens IF FK	5–2	Kulladals FF
Snöstorp Nyhem FF	2–1	Höllvikens GIF
Frinnaryds IF	2–5	IFK Motala
Oskarström IS	5–0	Brämhults IK
Gunnilse IS	2–0	IK Tord
Gerdskens BK	1–0	Askims IK
Mariestads BK	1–2	Husqvarna FF
Melleruds IF	1–0	Vara SK
Ulvåkers IF	2–3	Degerfors IF
KF Velebit	0–2	Tidaholms GoIF
Viksjöfors IF	0–5	Sandvikens IF
14 April 2002
Lucksta IF	1–1 (p. 4–2)	Östersunds FK
Morön BK	0–2	Bodens BK
Krylbo IF	2–1	Tillberga IK
Värtans IK	1–3	Eskilstuna City FK
BK Zeros	1–1 (p. 5–3)	IFK Ölme
Bankeryds SK	0–2	Ytterby IS
IFK Tumbas FK	1–2	Spårvägens FF
IF Vindhemspojkarna	2–3	Väsby IK
Östra Ryds IF	1–2	Målilla GoIF
Vivalla-Lundby IF	0–4	Carlstad United BK
Visby IF Gute FK	0–4	IF Brommapojkarna
Svedala IF	3–4	Ängelholms FF

== Second round ==
In this round the 34 winning teams from the previous round were joined by 30 teams from Allsvenskan and Superettan. The 32 matches were played between 23 April and 4 May 2002.

Team 1	Score	Team 2
23 April 2002
Sandvikens IF	2–1	Trelleborgs FF
24 April 2002
IFK Motala	0–7	Djurgårdens IF
IFK Hässleholm	0–0 (p. 3–4)	GIF Sundsvall
25 April 2002
Gunnilse IS	0–1	IFK Norrköping
Bunkeflo IF	3–0	Umeå FC
Krylbo IF	1–5	IFK Malmö FK
Snöstorp Nyhem FF	1–4	Hammarby IF
Husqvarna FF	2–5	IK Brage
Melleruds IF	2–3 (gg)	Assyriska Föreningen
BK Forward	1–3	FC Café Opera United
Oskarström IS	0–6	Örgryte IS
IF Brommapojkarna	0–1	Helsingborgs IF
Eskilstuna City FK	4–5	Västerås SK FK
Ängelholms FF	2–0	Gefle IF
Myresjö IF	2–1	Västra Frölunda IF
Skiljebo SK	2–1	BK Häcken
Ytterby IS	1–4	Östers IF
Stavstens IF FK	1–3	Motala AIF FK
Friska Viljor FC	2–2 (p. 3–4)	Malmö FF
Degerfors IF	3–1	IF Sylvia
Målilla GoIF	1–6	Gerdskens BK
Syrianska FC	4–1	Enköpings SK FK
Gamla Upsala SK	0–2	Mjällby AIF
BK Zeros	0–2	Kalmar FF
Lucksta IF	0–4	IF Elfsborg
Väsby IK	2–1 (gg)	GAIS
Tidaholms GoIF	4–2	Landskrona BoIS
Bodens BK	2–3	AIK
Spårvägens FF	1–4	Halmstads BK
IK Oddevold	0–4	Örebro SK
Essinge IK International FC	2–0	Lundens AIS
4 May 2002
Carlstad United BK	0–1	IFK Göteborg

== Third round ==
The 16 matches in this round were played between 7 May and 17 May 2002.

Team 1	Score	Team 2
7 May 2002
Djurgårdens IF	1–0	Sandvikens IF
8 May 2002
Östers IF	1–3	Degerfors IF
9 May 2002
GIF Sundsvall	3–2	Tidaholms GoIF
Väsby IK	3–1	Skiljebo SK
Assyriska Föreningen	1–3	IFK Malmö FK
Gerdskens BK	1–5	Örebro SK
Hammarby IF	3–1	Halmstads BK
IK Brage	1–2	Myresjö IF
Mjällby AIF	0–2	Ängelholms FF
Bunkeflo IF	3–2 (gg)	Essinge IK Intern FC
Kalmar FF	1–2	IF Elfsborg
AIK	4–0	Motala AIF FK
16 May 2002
Helsingborgs IF	0–3	Malmö FF
IFK Norrköping	0–5	Västerås SK FK
Örgryte IS	4–0	FC Café Opera United
17 May 2002
IFK Göteborg	4–1	Syrianska FC

== Fourth round ==
The 8 matches in this round were played between 26 June and 27 June 2002.

Team 1	Score	Team 2
26 June 2002
Degerfors IF	1–2	AIK
Myresjö IF	3–4 (gg)	Malmö FF
Ängelholms FF	0–0 (p. 1–3)	Väsby IK
Örebro SK	5–2	GIF Sundsvall
IFK Göteborg	5–0	Bunkeflo IF
27 June 2002
IF Elfsborg	3–1	Västerås SK FK
IFK Malmö FK	1–5	Djurgårdens IF
Örgryte IS	2–3 (gg)	Hammarby IF

== Quarter-finals ==
The 4 matches in this round were played between 18 July and 26 July 2002.

Team 1	Score	Team 2
18 July 2002
AIK	2–0	Hammarby IF
Malmö FF	4–2	Örebro SK
19 July 2002
Djurgårdens IF	3–2 (gg)	Väsby IK
26 July 2002
IF Elfsborg	1–1 (p. 4–3)	IFK Göteborg

== Semi-finals ==
The semi-finals were played on 26 September 2002.

Team 1	Score	Team 2
26 September 2002
IF Elfsborg	0–1	AIK
Djurgårdens IF	4–0	Malmö FF

== Final ==
The final was played on 9 November 2002 at the Råsunda Stadium.

9 November 2002
15:30 CET

AIK	0–1 (a.e.t.)	Djurgårdens IF
	Report	Chanko 99'

Råsunda, Solna
Attendance: 33,727
Referee: Martin Ingvarsson (Hässleholm)
