= 2002 Allsvenskan =

78th season of Allsvenskan

Allsvenskan
- Season: 2002
- Champions: Djurgårdens IF
- Relegated: IFK Norrköping; Kalmar FF
- Champions League: Djurgårdens IF
- UEFA Cup: Malmö FF
- Matches: 182
- Goals: 512 (2.81 per match)
- Top goalscorer: Peter Ijeh, Malmö FF (24)
- Average attendance: 10,180

Allsvenskan 2002, part of the 2002 Swedish football season, was the 78th Allsvenskan season played. The first match was played 6 April 2002 and the last match was played 2 November 2002. Djurgårdens IF won the league ahead of runners-up Malmö FF, while IFK Norrköping and Kalmar FF were relegated.

== Participating clubs ==
Location of the participating clubs

Club	Last season	First season in league	First season of current spell
AIK	3rd	1924–25	1981
Djurgårdens IF	2nd	1927–28	2001
IF Elfsborg	10th	1926–27	1997
IFK Göteborg	4th	1924–25	1977
Halmstads BK	7th	1933–34	1993
Hammarby IF	1st	1924–25	1998
Helsingborgs IF	5th	1924–25	1993
Kalmar FF	1st (Superettan)	1949–50	2002
Landskrona BoIS	2nd (Superettan)	1924–25	2002
Malmö FF	9th	1931–32	2001
IFK Norrköping	12th	1924–25	1984
GIF Sundsvall	11th	1965	2000
Örebro SK	8th	1946–47	1989
Örgryte IS	6th	1924–25	1995

== League table ==
Pos	Team	Pld	W	D	L	GF	GA	GD	Pts	Qualification or relegation
1	Djurgårdens IF (C)	26	16	4	6	51	33	+18	52	Qualification to Champions League second qualifying round
2	Malmö FF	26	14	4	8	52	32	+20	46	Qualification to UEFA Cup qualifying round
3	Örgryte IS	26	12	8	6	49	38	+11	44	Qualification to Intertoto Cup first round
4	Helsingborgs IF	26	10	8	8	38	38	0	38	
5	AIK	26	9	10	7	35	38	−3	37	Qualification to UEFA Cup qualifying round (Note: AIK qualified for the UEFA Cup as Svenska Cupen runners-up 2002.)
6	Halmstads BK	26	8	12	6	35	28	+7	36	
7	Örebro SK	26	9	8	9	32	39	−7	35	
8	GIF Sundsvall	26	8	9	9	29	35	−6	33	
9	Hammarby IF	26	8	8	10	43	42	+1	32	
10	IF Elfsborg	26	8	8	10	25	31	−6	32	
11	Landskrona BoIS	26	8	6	12	41	39	+2	30	
12	IFK Göteborg (O)	26	8	4	14	25	39	−14	28	Qualification to Relegation play-offs
13	IFK Norrköping (R)	26	6	9	11	37	40	−3	27	Relegation to Superettan
14	Kalmar FF (R)	26	6	6	14	20	40	−20	24	Relegation to Superettan

Source: svenskfotboll.se (in Swedish)
Rules for classification: 1) points; 2) goal difference; 3) number of goals scored.
(C) Champions; (O) Play-off winners; (R) Relegated

== Results ==
Home \ Away	AIK	DIF	IFE	IFKG	HBK	HAM	HEL	KFF	LBoIS	MFF	IFKN	GIFS	ÖSK	ÖIS
AIK		0–3	0–2	3–0	1–1	2–2	1–1	2–1	3–1	1–2	1–3	2–1	1–1	1–1
Djurgårdens IF	3–4		1–1	1–0	1–3	2–1	1–1	1–0	1–0	3–4	6–3	2–1	3–0	2–3
IF Elfsborg	0–1	0–2		2–1	1–1	1–2	0–1	1–0	0–3	2–1	2–2	0–0	3–0	2–1
IFK Göteborg	2–0	1–2	1–2		1–0	3–1	0–1	0–2	0–0	0–4	1–0	0–0	1–1	2–5
Halmstads BK	1–1	1–1	0–1	2–1		1–1	2–2	1–0	1–1	1–0	3–2	0–1	2–0	1–1
Hammarby IF	0–2	1–2	1–1	0–1	2–2		3–1	3–1	1–2	3–1	3–1	3–1	0–2	2–3
Helsingborgs IF	2–1	1–3	0–0	2–1	0–0	4–2		0–0	2–3	2–3	1–4	5–2	2–1	2–0
Kalmar FF	0–0	0–1	1–1	0–1	0–5	1–1	1–1		2–1	0–3	1–0	3–1	0–1	1–3
Landskrona BoIS	2–3	1–1	2–1	1–2	2–2	2–3	6–2	1–3		0–1	0–1	2–2	3–1	3–1
Malmö FF	5–0	1–2	0–0	4–2	2–1	1–1	0–2	4–0	2–1		3–2	0–2	4–1	0–1
IFK Norrköping	1–1	0–1	3–1	1–1	0–0	1–1	1–0	5–1	1–1	0–3		0–0	2–2	1–2
GIF Sundsvall	1–1	2–1	1–0	1–2	3–2	1–4	0–1	0–1	1–0	1–0	1–1		1–1	1–1
Örebro SK	0–1	0–3	2–0	2–0	3–1	2–1	1–0	1–1	1–3	2–2	1–0	2–2		3–2
Örgryte IS	2–2	4–2	4–1	2–1	0–1	1–1	2–2	2–0	1–0	2–2	3–2	1–2	1–1	

Source: Swedish Football Association (in Swedish)
Legend: Blue = home team win; Yellow = draw; Red = away team win.

== Relegation play-offs ==
6 November 2002
19:00 CET

Västra Frölunda	1–1	IFK Göteborg
Mourad 47'	Report	Rosenkvist 56'

Ullevi, Gothenburg
Attendance: 10,056
Referee: Jonas Eriksson (Stockholm)

10 November 2002
13:00 CET

IFK Göteborg	2–0	Västra Frölunda
Henriksson 42', 45'	Report

Gamla Ullevi, Gothenburg
Attendance: 7,211
Referee: Peter Fröjdfeldt (Eskilstuna)

IFK Göteborg won 3–1 on aggregate.

== Season statistics ==
=== Top scorers ===
Rank	Player	Club	Goals
1	(Nigeria) Peter Ijeh	Malmö FF	24
2	(Brazil) Álvaro Santos	Helsingborgs IF	16
3	(Brazil) Afonso Alves	Örgryte IS	13
4	(Sweden) Kim Källström	Djurgårdens IF	12
4	(Sweden) Peter Markstedt	Hammarby IF	12
6	(Sweden) Kennedy Bakircioglu	Hammarby IF	11
6	(Sweden) Daniel Nannskog	Landskrona BoIS	11
6	(Finland) Antti Sumiala	IFK Norrköping	11
9	(Sweden) Andreas Johansson	Djurgårdens IF	10
10	(Sweden) Hasse Berggren	IF Elfsborg	9
10	(Sweden) Niklas Skoog	Malmö FF	9

=== Attendances ===
	Club	Home average	Away average	Home high
1	AIK	16,551	12,727	31,948
2	Djurgårdens IF	14,246	13,442	29,423
3	Hammarby IF	13,296	12,511	27,888
4	Malmö FF	13,058	10,792	24,570
5	IFK Göteborg	11,417	12,751	42,386
6	IFK Norrköping	10,957	8,446	16,047
7	Helsingborgs IF	10,439	9,522	16,069
8	Örgryte IS	8,750	11,005	37,763
9	Örebro SK	8,039	7,744	11,936
10	IF Elfsborg	7,668	9,507	16,663
11	Landskrona BoIS	7,546	9,924	11,902
12	Halmstads BK	6,940	8,490	10,552
13	Kalmar FF	6,709	7,969	9,290
14	GIF Sundsvall	6,476	7,263	8,255
—	Total	10,150	—	42,386
