= 1997 Djurgårdens IF season =

Djurgården
1997 season
- Manager: Roger Lundin
- Division 1 Norra: 2nd (to promotion play-offs)
- Svenska Cupen: 3rd round
- Top goalscorer: League: Fredrik Dahlström (14); All: Fredrik Dahlström (17)
- Highest home attendance: 12,522 (26 May vs Hammarby IF, Division 1 Norra)
- Lowest home attendance: 1,320 (4 June vs Lira Luleå BK, Division 1 Norra)
- Average home league attendance: 2,965

The 1997 season was Djurgårdens IF's 97th in existence, their 4th season in Division 1 Norra and their 2nd consecutive season in the league. They were competing in Allsvenskan and 1997–98 Svenska Cupen.

== Player statistics ==
Appearances for competitive matches only.

No.	Pos	Nat	Player	Total		Division 1		Allsvenskan promotion play-off		Svenska Cupen	
No.	Pos	Nat	Player	Apps	Goals	Apps	Goals	Apps	Goals	Apps	Goals
		(Sweden) SWE	Stefan Alvén	24	1	22	1	2	0		
		(Sweden) SWE	Johan Andersson	20	6	18	6	2	0		
		(Sweden) SWE	Bo Andersson	20	2	20	2	0	0		
		(Sweden) SWE	Carlos Banda	6	0	6	0	0	0		
		(Sweden) SWE	Christer Bergqvist	16	1	16	1	0	0		
		(Sweden) SWE	Kenneth Bergqvist	22	0	22	0	0	0		
		(Sweden) SWE	Michael Borgqvist	27	2	25	2	2	0		
		(Sweden) SWE	Fredrik Dahlström	27	15	25	14	2	1		
		(Sweden) SWE	Kaj Eskelinen	25	13	23	13	2	0		
		(Sweden) SWE	Christian Gröning	4	0	4	0	0	0		
		(Federal Republic of Yugoslavia) YUG	Aleksandar Jovovic	3	0	3	0	0	0		
		(Sweden) SWE	Markus Karlsson	15	1	13	1	2	0		
		(Sweden) SWE	Peter Langemar	25	3	23	3	2	0		
		(Sweden) SWE	Magnus Lindblad	3	0	3	0	0	0		
		(Sweden) SWE	Daniel Nannskog	25	10	23	10	2	0		
		(Sweden) SWE	Lucas Nilsson	7	0	7	0	0	0		
		(Norway) NOR	Thor André Olsen	27	0	25	0	2	0		
		(Sweden) SWE	Fred Persson	21	1	20	1	1	0		
		(Sweden) SWE	Jon Persson	26	3	24	3	2	0		
		(Sweden) SWE	Zoran Stojcevski	21	5	19	5	2	0		
		(Sweden) SWE	Sharbel Touma	8	0	8	0	0	0		

=== Goals ===
==== Total ====
Name	Goals
(Sweden) Fredrik Dahlström	17
(Sweden) Kaj Eskelinen	15
(Sweden) Daniel Nannskog	12
(Sweden) Johan Andersson	6
(Sweden) Zoran Stojcevski	6
(Sweden) Bo Andersson	5
(Sweden) Jon Persson	4
(Sweden) Peter Langemar	3
(Sweden) Stefan Alvén	2
(Sweden) Michael Borgqvist	2
(Sweden) Christer Bergqvist	1
(Sweden) Kenneth Bergqvist	1
(Sweden) Markus Karlsson	1
(Sweden) Lucas Nilsson	1
(Sweden) Fred Persson	1
(Sweden) Sharbel Touma	1

==== Division 1 Norra ====
Name	Goals
(Sweden) Fredrik Dahlström	14
(Sweden) Kaj Eskelinen	13
(Sweden) Daniel Nannskog	10
(Sweden) Johan Andersson	6
(Sweden) Zoran Stojcevski	5
(Sweden) Peter Langemar	3
(Sweden) Jon Persson	3
(Sweden) Bo Andersson	2
(Sweden) Michael Borgqvist	2
(Sweden) Stefan Alvén	1
(Sweden) Christer Bergqvist	1
(Sweden) Markus Karlsson	1
(Sweden) Fred Persson	1

==== Svenska Cupen ====
Name	Goals
(Sweden) Bo Andersson	3
(Sweden) Fredrik Dahlström	2
(Sweden) Kaj Eskelinen	2
(Sweden) Daniel Nannskog	2
(Sweden) Stefan Alvén	1
(Sweden) Kenneth Bergqvist	1
(Sweden) Lucas Nilsson	1
(Sweden) Sharbel Touma	1
(Sweden) Jon Persson	1

==== Allsvenskan play-offs ====
Name	Goals
(Sweden) Fredrik Dahlström	1

== Competitions ==
=== Division 1 Norra ===
==== League table ====
Pos	Team	Pld	W	D	L	GF	GA	GD	Pts
1	Hammarby IF	26	19	5	2	55	17	+38	62
2	Djurgårdens IF	26	17	6	3	65	30	+35	57
3	Umeå FC	26	12	7	7	52	38	+14	43
4	GIF Sundsvall	26	11	6	9	40	31	+9	39
5	Gefle IF	26	10	7	9	44	31	+13	37

==== Matches ====
29 April 1997	Djurgårdens IF	0 – 0	Nacka FF	Stockholm
				Stadium: Stockholm Olympic Stadium; Attendance: 2,161

4 May 1997	Assyriska Föreningen	0 – 3	Djurgårdens IF	Södertälje
			Langemar 12'; J. Persson 30'; Dahlström 73'	Stadium: Bårsta IP; Attendance: 3,150

12 May 1997	Djurgårdens IF	1 – 0	IK Brage	Stockholm
	Borgqvist 57'			Stadium: Stockholm Olympic Stadium; Attendance: 1,639

15 May 1997	IFK Luleå	0 – 1	Djurgårdens IF	Luleå
			Dahlström 88'	Stadium: Skogsvallen; Attendance: 561

19 May 1997	Spårvägens FF	1 – 5	Djurgårdens IF	Stockholm
	Myrthil 17'		Eskelinen 19'; Langemar 20'; Dahlström 33'; Alvén 47'; F. Persson 53'	Stadium: Kristinebergs IP; Attendance: 1,655

26 May 1997	Djurgårdens IF	0 – 1	Hammarby IF	Solna
			Andersson 34'	Stadium: Råsunda Stadium; Attendance: 12,522

1 June 1997	Enköpings SK	3 – 5	Djurgårdens IF	Enköping
	Akmar 24'; Norell 40', 44'		Dahlström 7', 28', 40'; J. Andersson 28'; Eskelinen 71'	Stadium: Enavallen; Attendance: 2,503

4 June 1997	Djurgårdens IF	3 – 0	Lira Luleå BK	Stockholm
	Nannskog 35'; Eskelinen 62', 83'			Stadium: Stockholm Olympic Stadium; Attendance: 1,320

10 June 1997	Umeå FC	2 – 2	Djurgårdens IF	Umeå
	Westerberg 50'; Lundgren 81'		Nannskog 3'; Dahlström 36'	Stadium: Gammliavallen; Attendance: 5,063

16 June 1997	Djurgårdens IF	1 – 0	IF Brommapojkarna	Stockholm
	C. Bergqvist 67'			Stadium: Stockholm Olympic Stadium; Attendance: 1,420

22 June 1997	GIF Sundsvall	3 – 0	Djurgårdens IF	Sundsvall
	Wikström 25'; Östlund 36'; Forsberg 82'			Stadium: Idrottsparken; Attendance: 888

29 June 1997	Djurgårdens IF	3 – 0 (Note: Djurgården was awarded a 3–0 win by the Swedish FA due to Vasalund IF fielding too many non-EU players. Original was score 1–0.)	Vasalund IF	Stockholm
	Dahlström 85'			Stadium: Stockholm Olympic Stadium; Attendance: 1,896

3 July 1997	Djurgårdens IF	2 – 1	Gefle IF	Stockholm
	Dahlström 45'; J. Persson 89'		Berggren 42'	Stadium: Stockholm Olympic Stadium; Attendance: 2,012

3 August 1997	Gefle IF	3 – 4	Djurgårdens IF	Gävle
	Edvardssson 34'; Berggren 43'; Lööf 88'		Dahlström 18', 84'; Eskelinen 70'; J. Persson 89'	Stadium: Strömvallen; Attendance: 2,112

12 August 1997	IF Brommapojkarna	0 – 5	Djurgårdens IF	Stockholm
			Stojcevski 9', 71'; Borgqvist 65'; J. Andersson 77'; B. Andersson 90'	Stadium: Grimsta IP; Attendance: 2,643

18 August 1997	Djurgårdens IF	5 – 1	Umeå FC	Stockholm
	Nannskog 35', 39'; Dahlström 55'; J. Andersson 73' o.g. 78'		Häggmark 82'	Stadium: Stockholm Olympic Stadium; Attendance: 4,109

26 August 1997	Vasalund IF	1 – 4	Djurgårdens IF	Solna
	McNiven 60'		Stojcevski 36', 71'; B. Andersson 54'; J. Andersson 73'	Stadium: Skytteholms IP; Attendance: 3,662

2 September 1997	Djurgårdens IF	2 – 1	GIF Sundsvall	Stockholm
	Eskelinen 29'; Nannskog 50'		o.g. 66'	Stadium: Stockholm Olympic Stadium; Attendance: 3,481

7 September 1997	Lira Luleå BK	2 – 4	Djurgårdens IF	Luleå
	Pettersson 69'; Karlsson 85'		Nannskog 12'; Dahlström 28'; Eskelinen 37'; Stojcevski 69'	Stadium: Skogsvallen; Attendance: 812

11 September 1997	Djurgårdens IF	2 – 0	Enköpings SK	Stockholm
	Nannskog 25', 50'			Stadium: Stockholm Olympic Stadium; Attendance: 1,642

23 September 1997	Djurgårdens IF	3 – 3	Spårvägens FF	Stockholm
	Eskelinen 6', 24', 86'	Report	Henriksson 32', 41'; Flobecker 91'	Stadium: Stockholm Olympic Stadium; Attendance: 1,531

28 September 1997	IK Brage	4 – 2	Djurgårdens IF	Borlänge
	Brcic 2', 69'; Forsman 61'; Thomas 90'		J. Andersson 29' (pen.); Langemar 32'	Stadium: Domnarvsvallen; Attendance: 1,756

1 October 1997	Hammarby IF	2 – 2	Djurgårdens IF	Stockholm
	Andersson 39'; Bergman 92'		J. Andersson 44' (pen.); Karlsson 88'	Stadium: Söderstadion; Attendance: 9,127

6 October 1997	Djurgårdens IF	0 – 0	Assyriska Föreningen	Stockholm
				Stadium: Stockholm Olympic Stadium; Attendance: 1,921

13 October 1997	Nacka FF	1 – 5	Djurgårdens IF	Nacka
	Kontinen 64'		Dahlström 18'; Nannskog 75'; Eskelinen 77', 89', 92' (pen.)	Stadium: Nacka IP; Attendance: 2,191

19 October 1997	Djurgårdens IF	1 – 1	IFK Luleå	Stockholm
	Nannskog 64'		Westin 93'	Stadium: Stockholm Olympic Stadium; Attendance: 2,893

=== Allsvenskan play-offs ===
29 October 1997 1st leg	Djurgårdens IF	1 – 1	Östers IF	Stockholm
	Dahlström 5'	Report	Blomqvist 77'	Stadium: Stockholm Olympic Stadium; Attendance: 6,046

5 November 1997 2nd leg	Östers IF	2 – 0	Djurgårdens IF	Växjö
	Gustafson 1'; Watson 71'	Report		Stadium: Värendsvallen; Attendance: 6,833

=== Svenska Cupen ===
27 July 1997	Arnäs IF	2 – 8	Djurgårdens IF
	Lundqvist; Bylund		B. Andersson (2); Dahlström (2); Alvén; Touma; K. Bergqvist; J. Persson	Attendance: 500

28 August 1997	Täfteå IK	0 – 2	Djurgårdens IF	Täfteå
			B. Andersson 50'; Nilsson 55'	Stadium: Täfteborg; Attendance: 490

17 September 1997	Gestrike-Hammarby IF	2 – 5	Djurgårdens IF
	?		Eskelinen (2); Nannskog (2); Stojkovic
