= 2000 Djurgårdens IF season =

Djurgården
2000 season
- Chairman: Bo Lundquist
- Manager: Sören Åkeby & Zoran Lukić
- Stadium: Stockholms Stadion
- Superettan: Winners (promoted)
- Svenska Cupen: 4th round
- Top goalscorer: League: Samuel Wowoah (12); All: Samuel Wowoah (15)
- Highest home attendance: 13,305 (4 September vs Malmö FF, Superettan)
- Lowest home attendance: 2,205 (16 October vs IF Sylvia, Superettan)

1999 was Djurgården remoted from Allsvenskan. 2000 was the first season of the new second division Superettan. Djurgården finished first.

== Player statistics ==
Appearances for competitive matches only

No.	Pos	Nat	Player	Total		Superettan		Svenska Cupen	
No.	Pos	Nat	Player	Apps	Goals	Apps	Goals	Apps	Goals
1	GK	(Sweden) SWE	Rami Shaaban	30	0	29	0	1	0
2		(Sweden) SWE	Patrik Eriksson-Ohlsson	27	1	25	1	2	0
3		(Sweden) SWE	Mikael Dorsin	30	5	27	5	3	0
4		(Sweden) SWE	Magnus Samuelsson	11	1	10	1	1	0
5		(Sweden) SWE	Richard Henriksson	15	1	12	1	3	0
6		(Sweden) SWE	Magnus Pehrsson	31	7	29	4	2	3
7		(Sweden) SWE	Abgar Barsom	31	2	28	2	3	0
8		(Sweden) SWE	Samuel Wowoah	24	15	22	12	2	3
9		(Sweden) SWE	Stefan Bärlin	30	11	27	9	3	2
10		(Sweden) SWE	Andreas Johansson	26	8	24	7	2	1
11		(Sweden) SWE	Pierre Gallo	27	13	25	10	2	3
12		(Sweden) SWE	Markus Karlsson	25	0	24	0	1	0
13		(Sweden) SWE	Stefan Bergtoft	10	0	8	0	2	0
14		(Sweden) SWE	Jones Kusi-Asare	17	4	15	3	2	1
15	GK	(The Gambia) GAM	Pa Dembo Touray	3	0	1	0	2	0
16		(Sweden) SWE	Jörgen Sundström	16	0	14	0	2	0
17		(Sweden) SWE	Lucas Nilsson	21	10	19	6	2	4
18		(Sweden) SWE	Niclas Rasck	27	0	25	0	2	0
19		(Sweden) SWE	Joel Riddez	18	2	17	1	1	1
20		(Sweden) SWE	Pagguy Zunda	2	0	2	0	0	0
		(Sweden) SWE	Umut Cesmeli	0	0	0	0	0	0
		(Sweden) SWE	Sebastian Haag	0	0	0	0	0	0
		(Sweden) SWE	Stefan Rehn	21	4	18	3	3	1
		(Sweden) SWE	Olle Sjösteen	1	0	1	0	0	0

=== Topscorers ===
==== Svenska Cupen ====
Name	Goals
(Sweden) Lucas Nilsson	4
(Sweden) Pierre Gallo	3
(Sweden) Magnus Pehrsson	3
(Sweden) Samuel Wowoah	3
(Sweden) Stefan Bärlin	2
(Sweden) Andreas Johansson	1
(Sweden) Jones Kusi-Asare	1
(Sweden) Stefan Rehn	1
(Sweden) Joel Riddez	1

== Competitions ==
=== Superettan ===
==== League table ====
Pos	Team	Pld	W	D	L	GF	GA	GD	Pts	Promotion, qualification or relegation
1	Djurgårdens IF (C, P)	30	20	3	7	68	32	+36	63	Promotion to Allsvenskan
2	Malmö FF (P)	30	18	6	6	47	33	+14	60	Promotion to Allsvenskan
3	Mjällby AIF	30	15	8	7	56	31	+25	53	Qualification to Promotion playoffs
4	Landskrona BoIS	30	16	4	10	59	37	+22	52	
5	Västerås SK	30	14	9	7	50	39	+11	51	

Rules for classification: 1) points; 2) goal difference; 3) number of goals scored.
(C) Champions; (P) Promoted

==== Results summary ====
Overall								Home						Away					
Pld	W	D	L	GF	GA	GD	Pts	W	D	L	GF	GA	GD	W	D	L	GF	GA	GD
30	20	3	7	68	32	+36	63	11	1	3	38	18	+20	9	2	4	30	14	+16

==== Matches ====
Kickoff times are in CEST.

16 April 2000 1	Djurgårdens IF	5 – 2	Umeå FC	Stockholm
	Johansson 14', 75'; Eriksson-Ohlsson 31'; Gallo 45'; Kusi-Asare 70'	Report	Petrović 27'; Lindgren 43'	Stadium: Stockholms Stadion

24 April 2000 2	Ljungskile SK	1 – 0	Djurgårdens IF	Ljungskile
	Johansson 74'	Report		Stadium: Skarsjövallen

2 May 2000 3	Djurgårdens IF	0 – 1	Enköpings SK	Stockholm
		Report	Johansson 27'	Stadium: Stockholms Stadion

7 May 2000 4	Assyriska Föreningen	0 – 1	Djurgårdens IF	Södertälje
		Report	Riddez 58'	Stadium: Bårsta IP

15 May 2000 5	Djurgårdens IF	3 – 1	Åtvidabergs FF	Stockholm
	Pehrsson 66'; Dorsin 68'; Bärlin 82'	Report	Karlsson 69'	Stadium: Stockholms Stadion

18 May 2000 6	Malmö FF	0 – 2	Djurgårdens IF	Malmö
		Report	Gallo 16'; Wowoah 28'	Stadium: Malmö Stadion

23 May 2000 7	Djurgårdens IF	4 – 1	FC Café Opera	Stockholm
	Pehrsson 30'; Wowoah 41', 52'; Bärlin 59'	Report	Stojcevski 4' (pen.)	Stadium: Stockholms Stadion

29 May 2000 8	Östers IF	2 – 3	Djurgårdens IF	Växjö
	Ekstrand 36'; Olsson 87'	Report	Gallo 19', 25'; Samuelsson 84'	Stadium: Värendsvallen

4 June 2000 9	Mjällby AIF	1 – 0	Djurgårdens IF	Hällevik
	Nilsson 82'	Report		Stadium: Strandvallen

8 June 2000 10	Djurgårdens IF	4 – 1	Gunnilse IS	Stockholm
	Kusi-Asare 12'; Barsom 41'; Nilsson 62'; Pehrsson 70'	Report	Granath 31'	Stadium: Stockholms Stadion

12 June 2000 11	Djurgårdens IF	0 – 1	Västerås SK	Stockholm
		Report	Larsson 71'	Stadium: Stockholms Stadion

20 June 2000 12	IF Sylvia	2 – 5	Djurgårdens IF	Norrköping
	Åkerberg 3'; Nannskog 27'	Report	Gallo 15'; Nilsson 57'; Dorsin 67'; Kusi-Asare 70'; Barsom 90'	Stadium: Bollspelaren

1 July 2000 13	IK Brage	1 – 1	Djurgårdens IF	Borlänge
	72'	Report	35' (o.g.)	Stadium: Domnarvsvallen

5 July 2000 14	Djurgårdens IF	3 – 1	Landskrona BoIS	Stockholm
	Nilsson 33'; Gallo 60'; Johansson 70'	Report	Ljung 55' (pen.)	Stadium: Stockholms Stadion

9 July 2000 15	Kalmar FF	2 – 0	Djurgårdens IF	Kalmar
	Lindqvist 27'; Mobäck 74'	Report		Stadium: Fredriksskans

24 July 2000 16	Djurgårdens IF	2 – 1	Kalmar FF	Stockholm
	Johansson 43'; Rehn 85'	Report	Spahic 18'	Stadium: Stockholms Stadion

2 August 2000 17	Djurgårdens IF	4 – 2	Ljungskile SK	Stockholm
	Gallo 14', 62'; Nilsson 24', 41'	Report	Karlsson 33'; Bumbar 71'	Stadium: Stockholms Stadion

7 August 2000 18	Umeå FC	0 – 2	Djurgårdens IF	Umeå
			Johansson 24'; Wowoah 87'	Stadium: Gammliavallen

12 August 2000 19	Enköpings SK	0 – 1	Djurgårdens IF	Enköping
			Bärlin 13'	Stadium: Enavallen

20 August 2000 20	Djurgårdens IF	2 – 1	Assyriska Föreningen	Stockholm
	Dorsin 27'; Wowoah 84'	Report	Dahlström 41'	Stadium: Stockholms Stadion

27 August 2000 21	Åtvidabergs FF	1 – 5	Djurgårdens IF	Åtvidaberg
	Karlsson 84'		Wowoah 6'; Pehrsson 21'; Nilsson 57'; Dorsin 71'; Johansson 83'	Stadium: Kopparvallen

4 September 2000 22	Djurgårdens IF	6 – 1	Malmö FF	Stockholm
	Bärlin 9'; Johansson 20'; Wowoah 37', 64'; Rehn 47'; Dorsin 61'	Report	81' (o.g.)	Stadium: Stockholms Stadion

8 September 2000 23	FC Café Opera	1 – 2	Djurgårdens IF	Stockholm
	Neding 53'	Report	Rehn 73'; Bärlin 79'	Stadium: Stockholms Stadion

18 September 2000 24	Djurgårdens IF	1 – 0	Östers IF	Stockholm
	Bärlin 41'	Report		Stadium: Stockholms Stadion

18 September 2000 25	Gunnilse IS	0 – 6	Djurgårdens IF	Gothenburg
			Gallo 4', 19'; Wowoah 20'; Bärlin 45', 73', 90'	Stadium: Hjällbovallen

30 September 2000 26	Djurgårdens IF	2 – 0	Mjällby AIF	Stockholm
	Wowoah 5', 19'	Report		Stadium: Stockholms Stadion

8 October 2000 27	Västerås SK	0 – 0	Djurgårdens IF	Västerås
				Stadium: Arosvallen

16 October 2000 28	Djurgårdens IF	1 – 4	IF Sylvia	Stockholm
	Wowoah 68'	Report	Ström 5', 64' (pen.); Åkerberg 39'; Björkholm 42'	Stadium: Stockholms Stadion

22 October 2000 29	Landskrona BoIS	3 – 2	Djurgårdens IF	Landskrona
	Söderstjärna 25'; Milovanovic 56'		Nilsson 73' (pen.)	Stadium: Landskrona IP

29 October 2000 30	Djurgårdens IF	1 – 1	IK Brage	Stockholm
	Henriksson 23'	Report	Norell 66'	Stadium: Stockholms Stadion

=== 2000–01 Svenska Cupen ===
30 July 2000 Round 1	Nyköpings BIS	3 – 6	Djurgårdens IF	Nyköping
	?	Report	Pehrsson (2); Nilsson (2); Kusi-Asare; Rehn	Stadium: Rosvalla IP; Attendance: 812; Referee: Jan Andersson

23 August 2000 Round 2	Bollstanäs SK	0 – 11	Djurgårdens IF	Upplands Väsby
		Report	Gallo (3); Wowoah (3); Nilsson (2); Bärlin; Pehrsson; Riddez	Stadium: Vilundavallen; Attendance: 1,051; Referee: Stefan Johannesson

27 September 2000 Round 3	Nacka FF	0 – 2	Djurgårdens IF	Nacka
		Report	Bärlin 55'; Johansson 60'	Stadium: Nacka IP; Attendance: 984; Referee: Per-Olof Ståhl
