= 1999 Djurgårdens IF season =

Djurgården
1999 season
- Chairman: Bo Lundquist
- Manager: Michael Andersson (sacked); Sören Åkeby & Zoran Lukić
- Allsvenskan: 14th (relegated)
- Svenska Cupen: 1st round
- Top goalscorer: League: Sharbel Touma (8); All: Sharbel Touma (8)
- Highest home attendance: 23,066 (31 May vs Hammarby IF, Allsvenskan)
- Lowest home attendance: 5,011 (25 September vs Helsingborgs IF, Allsvenskan)

The team finished finishing fourteenth in Allsvenskan.

== Player statistics ==
Appearances for competitive matches only

| No. | Pos | Nat | Player | Total | | Allsvenskan | | Svenska Cupen | |
| No. | Pos | Nat | Player | Apps | Goals | Apps | Goals | Apps | Goals |
|---|---|---|---|---|---|---|---|---|---|
| | | (Sweden) SWE | Stefan Alvén | 24 | 0 | 24 | 0 | | |
| | | (Denmark) DEN | Bo Andersen | 11 | 0 | 11 | 0 | | |
| | | (Sweden) SWE | Michael Borgqvist | 22 | 1 | 22 | 1 | | |
| | | (Sweden) SWE | Patricio Cisternas | 14 | 0 | 14 | 0 | | |
| | | (Sweden) SWE | Fredrik Dahlström | 22 | 3 | 22 | 3 | | |
| | | (Sweden) SWE | Patrik Eriksson-Ohlsson | 19 | 1 | 19 | 1 | | |
| | | (Sweden) SWE | Pierre Gallo | 21 | 1 | 21 | 1 | | |
| | | (Sweden) SWE | Christian Gröning | 1 | 1 | 1 | 1 | | |
| | | (Sweden) SWE | Richard Henriksson | 1 | 0 | 1 | 0 | | |
| | | (Sweden) SWE | Markus Karlsson | 20 | 0 | 20 | 0 | | |
| | | (Sweden) SWE | Jones Kusi-Asare | 15 | 1 | 15 | 1 | | |
| | | (Sweden) SWE | Magnus Lindblad | 9 | 0 | 9 | 0 | | |
| | | (Sweden) SWE | Martin Lossman | 7 | 0 | 7 | 0 | | |
| | | (Sweden) SWE | Lucas Nilsson | 24 | 4 | 24 | 4 | | |
| | | (Sweden) SWE | Magnus Pehrsson | 23 | 1 | 23 | 1 | | |
| | | (Sweden) SWE | Jon Persson | 11 | 1 | 11 | 1 | | |
| | | (Sweden) SWE | Niclas Rasck | 23 | 2 | 23 | 2 | | |
| | | (Sweden) SWE | Joel Riddez | 18 | 0 | 18 | 0 | | |
| | | (Sweden) SWE | Magnus Samuelsson | 18 | 0 | 18 | 0 | | |
| | | (Sweden) SWE | Zoran Stojcevski | 12 | 0 | 12 | 0 | | |
| | | (Sweden) SWE | Sharbel Touma | 24 | 8 | 24 | 8 | | |
| | | (Sweden) SWE | Samuel Wowoah | 16 | 3 | 16 | 3 | | |

=== Topscorers ===
==== Svenska Cupen ====
| Name | Goals |
|---|---|
| (Sweden) Fredrik Dahlström | 2 |
| (Sweden) Joel Riddez | 2 |
| own goal | 2 |
| (Sweden) Markus Karlsson | 1 |
| (Sweden) Magnus Pehrsson | 1 |
| (Sweden) Zoran Stojcevski | 1 |
| (Sweden) Samuel Wowoah | 1 |

== Competitions ==
=== Allsvenskan ===
==== League table ====
| Pos | Team | Pld | W | D | L | GF | GA | GD | Pts | Qualification or relegation |
|---|---|---|---|---|---|---|---|---|---|---|
| 10 | Hammarby IF | 26 | 8 | 5 | 13 | 32 | 42 | −10 | 29 | |
| 11 | Kalmar FF (R) | 26 | 8 | 4 | 14 | 27 | 41 | −14 | 28 | Qualification to Relegation play-offs |
| 12 | Örebro SK (O) | 26 | 8 | 3 | 15 | 24 | 36 | −12 | 27 | Qualification to Relegation play-offs |
| 13 | Malmö FF (R) | 26 | 7 | 4 | 15 | 30 | 48 | −18 | 25 | Relegation to Superettan |
| 14 | Djurgårdens IF (R) | 26 | 5 | 9 | 12 | 27 | 41 | −14 | 24 | Relegation to Superettan |

Rules for classification: 1) points; 2) goal difference; 3) number of goals scored.
(O) Play-off winners; (R) Relegated

=== 1999–00 Svenska Cupen ===
| 25 July 1999 Round 1 | Hudiksvalls ABK | 1 – 4 | Djurgårdens IF | Hudiksvall |
| | Johansson 18' | Report | Riddez 5'; Pehrsson 21'; Stojcevski 36' o.g. 55' | Attendance: 935; Referee: Peter Höglund |

| 25 August 1999 Round 2 | Heby AIF | 1 – 4 | Djurgårdens IF | Sala |
| | Johansson 8' | Report | Riddez 21'; Dahlström 24', 78'; Wowoah 60' | Stadium: Tegelvallen; Attendance: 1,200; Referee: Lars Kratz |

| 22 September 1999 Round 3 | Essinge IK | 1 – 2 | Djurgårdens IF | Stockholm |
| 18:30 | Santos 73' | Report | o.g. 54'; Karlsson 61' | Stadium: Kristinebergs IP; Attendance: 510; Referee: Rune Larsson |

| 13 October 1999 Round 4 | IF Brommapojkarna | 1 – 0 | Djurgårdens IF | Stockholm |
| | Larsson 90' | Report | | Stadium: Grimsta IP; Attendance: 654; Referee: Jonas Eriksson |
