= 1998 Djurgårdens IF season =

Djurgården
1998 season
- Chairman: Bo Lundquist
- Manager: Michael Andersson
- Stadium: Stockholms Stadion
- Division 1 Norra: Winners (promoted)
- Svenska Cupen: Semi-finals
- Top goalscorer: League: Fredrik Dahlström (16); All: Fredrik Dahlström (16)
- Highest home attendance: 6,293 (4 October vs Umeå FC, Division 1)
- Lowest home attendance: 807 (21 June vs Gefle IF, Division 1)

== Player statistics ==
Appearances for competitive matches only

No.	Pos	Nat	Player	Total		Division 1		1997–98 Svenska Cupen 1998–99 Svenska Cupen	
No.	Pos	Nat	Player	Apps	Goals	Apps	Goals	Apps	Goals
		(Sweden) SWE	Stefan Alvén	25	0	25	0		
		(Sweden) SWE	Carlos Banda	12	0	12	0		
		(Sweden) SWE	Christer Bergqvist	9	0	9	0		
		(Sweden) SWE	Michael Borgqvist	23	2	23	2		
		(Sweden) SWE	Patricio Cisternas	24	0	24	0		
		(Sweden) SWE	Fredrik Dahlström	25	16	25	16		
		(Sweden) SWE	Mikael Dorsin	1	0	1	0		
		(Sweden) SWE	Pierre Gallo	22	5	22	5		
		(Sweden) SWE	Christian Gröning	13	2	13	2		
		(Sweden) SWE	Peter Hallströmn	11	0	11	0		
		(Sweden) SWE	Markus Karlsson	17	2	17	2		
		(Sweden) SWE	Peter Langemar	10	1	10	1		
		(Sweden) SWE	Magnus Lindblad	18	0	18	0		
		(Sweden) SWE	Martin Lossman	8	0	8	0		
		(Sweden) SWE	Daniel Martinez	14	2	14	2		
		(Sweden) SWE	Daniel Nannskog	21	8	21	8		
		(Sweden) SWE	Lucas Nilsson	22	11	22	11		
		(Sweden) SWE	Magnus Olsson	1	0	1	0		
		(Sweden) SWE	Fred Persson	18	1	18	1		
		(Sweden) SWE	Jon Persson	25	2	25	2		
		(Sweden) SWE	Zoran Stojcevski	3	0	3	0		
		(Sweden) SWE	Sharbel Touma	14	1	14	1		

=== Goals ===
==== Svenska Cupen ====
Name	Goals
(Sweden) Lucas Nilsson	3
(Sweden) Peter Langemar	2
(Sweden) Daniel Nannskog	2
(Sweden) Jon Persson	2
(Sweden) Michael Borgqvist	1
(Sweden) Markus Karlsson	1
(Sweden) Fred Persson	1
(Sweden) Zoran Stojcevski	1

== Competitions ==
=== Division 1 Norra ===
==== League table ====
Pos	Team	Pld	W	D	L	GF	GA	GD	Pts
1	Djurgårdens IF	26	17	3	6	53	30	+23	54
2	Umeå FC	26	14	7	5	59	40	+19	49
3	Västerås SK	26	14	5	7	48	32	+16	47
4	GIF Sundsvall	26	13	3	10	44	37	+7	42
5	Assyriska Föreningen	26	12	5	9	41	37	+4	41

=== Svenska Cupen ===
==== 1997–98 ====
29 March 1998 Round 4	Väsby IK	1 – 6	Djurgårdens IF
	Dolkov	Report	Langemar (2); Borgqvist; Stojcevski; Nilsson; F. Persson	Attendance: 430; Referee: Jonas Hagberg

20 April 1998 Round 5	Västerås SK	0 – 1	Djurgårdens IF	Västerås
		Report	Nannskog 70'	Stadium: Arosvallen; Attendance: 921; Referee: Miro Ukalovic

29 April 1998 Quarter-final	Djurgårdens IF	6 – 0	IFK Luleå	Stockholm
	J. Persson 20', 79'; Nilsson 62', 75'; Karlsson 71'; Nannskog 90'	Report		Stadium: Stockholm Olympic Stadium; Attendance: 1,512; Referee: Pekka Heinonen

7 May 1998 Semi-final	Djurgårdens IF	0 – 2	Helsingborgs IF	Stockholm
		Report	Jovanovski 2'; Storvik 34'	Stadium: Stockholm Olympic Stadium; Attendance: 2,871; Referee: Morgan Norman

Source: https://www.rsssf.org/tablesz/zwed98.html

==== 1998–99 ====
26 July 1998 Round 1	Värtans IK	4 – 0	Djurgårdens IF	Stockholm
		Report		Stadium: Hjorthagens IP; Referee: Rune Larsson
