= 1996 Djurgårdens IF season =

Djurgården
1996 season
- Manager: Anders Grönhagen
- Stadium: Stockholms Stadion
- Allsvenskan: 13th (relegated)
- Svenska Cupen: Group stage
- Intertoto Cup: Group stage
- Top goalscorer: League: Fredrik Dahlström; Zoran Stojcevski (5); All: Kaj Eskelinen (15)
- Highest home attendance: 11,020 (18 September vs AIK, Allsvenskan)
- Lowest home attendance: 0 (15 September vs Halmstads BK, Allsvenskan)

== Player statistics ==
Appearances for competitive matches only

No.	Pos	Nat	Player	Total		Allsvenskan		1995–96 Svenska Cupen 1996–97 Svenska Cupen		Intertoto Cup	
No.	Pos	Nat	Player	Apps	Goals	Apps	Goals	Apps	Goals	Apps	Goals
1		(Sweden) SWE	Magnus Lindblad	3	0	3	0				
2		(Sweden) SWE	Carlos Banda	3	0	3	0				
3		(Sweden) SWE	Kaj Eskelinen	24	4	24	4				
4		(Sweden) SWE	Kenneth Bergqvist	18	1	18	1				
5		(Sweden) SWE	Johan Andersson	22	1	22	1				
6		(Sweden) SWE	Jesper Jansson	24	1	24	1				
7		(Sweden) SWE	Fred Persson	1	0	1	0				
8		(Sweden) SWE	Zoran Stojcevski	22	5	22	5				
9		(Sweden) SWE	Fredrik Dahlström	19	5	19	5				
10		(Sweden) SWE	Nebojsa Novakovic	21	2	21	2				
11		(Sweden) SWE	Bo Andersson	19	4	19	4				
12		(Sweden) SWE	Markus Karlsson	20	0	20	0				
13		(Sweden) SWE	Christian Gröning	1	0	1	0				
14		(Sweden) SWE	Peter Langemar	15	2	15	2				
15		(Norway) NOR	Thor André Olsen	23	0	23	0				
16		(Sweden) SWE	Stefan Alvén	25	1	25	1				
17		(Sweden) SWE	Magnus Pehrsson	23	1	23	1				
18		(Sweden) SWE	Martin Åslund	18	1	18	1				
19		(Sweden) SWE	Klebér Saarenpää	19	0	19	0				
20		(Sweden) SWE	Anders Bengtsson	1	0	1	0				
21		(Sweden) SWE	Lucas Nilsson	1	0	1	0				
22		(Sweden) SWE	Mustafa Dimirtas	0	0	0	0				
23		(Sweden) SWE	Tony Löfholm	0	0	0	0				
24		(Sweden) SWE	Andreas Öhman	0	0	0	0				
25		(Sweden) SWE	Sharbel Touma	0	0	0	0				

=== Goals ===
==== Allsvenskan ====
Name	Goals
(Sweden) Fredrik Dahlström	5
(Sweden) Zoran Stojcevski	5
(Sweden) Bo Andersson	4
(Sweden) Kaj Eskelinen	4
(Sweden) Peter Langemar	2
(Sweden) Nebojsa Novakovic	2
(Sweden) Stefan Alvén	1
(Sweden) Kenneth Bergqvist	1
(Sweden) Jesper Jansson	1
(Sweden) Magnus Pehrsson	1
(Sweden) Martin Åslund	1
(Sweden) Johan Andersson	1

==== Svenska Cupen ====
Name	Goals
(Sweden) Kaj Eskelinen	6
(Sweden) Christian Gröning	5
(Sweden) Markus Karlsson	2
(Sweden) Martin Åslund	1
(Sweden) Kenneth Bergkvist	1
(Sweden) Jesper Jansson	1
(Sweden) Peter Langemar	1
(Sweden) Tony Löfholm	1
(Norway) Thor André Olsen	1
(Sweden) Magnus Pehrsson	1
(Sweden) Zoran Stojcevski	1
own goal	1

==== Intertoto Cup ====
Name	Goals
(Sweden) Fredrik Dahlström	5
(Sweden) Kaj Eskelinen	5
(Sweden) Bo Andersson	2
(Sweden) Carlos Banda	1
(Sweden) Zoran Stojcevski	1
own goal	1

== Competitions ==
=== Allsvenskan ===
==== League table ====
Pos	Team	Pld	W	D	L	GF	GA	GD	Pts	Qualification or relegation
10	Örgryte IS	26	8	7	11	27	30	−3	31	
11	Umeå FC (R)	26	8	6	12	35	45	−10	30	Qualification to Relegation play-offs
12	Trelleborgs FF (O)	26	9	3	14	33	48	−15	30	Qualification to Relegation play-offs
13	Djurgårdens IF (R)	26	8	3	15	28	43	−15	27	Relegation to Division 1
14	IK Oddevold (R)	26	5	4	17	20	43	−23	19	Relegation to Division 1

Source: SFS-Bolletinen
Rules for classification: 1) points; 2) goal difference; 3) number of goals scored.
(O) Play-off winners; (R) Relegated

==== Matches ====
21 April 1996	Halmstads BK	1 – 0	Djurgårdens IF	Halmstad
	Smith 21'	Report		Stadium: Örjans Vall; Attendance: 6,476

29 April 1996	Djurgårdens IF	1 – 1	IFK Norrköping	Stockholm
	B. Andersson 45'	Report	Gustafsson 11'	Stadium: Stockholm Olympic Stadium; Attendance: 4,522

2 May 1996	Örgryte IS	3 – 0	Djurgårdens IF	Gothenburg
	Bertilsson 20'; Allbäck 86'; Kristinsson 90' (pen.)	Report		Stadium: Gamla Ullevi; Attendance: 1,439

5 May 1996	Helsingborgs IF	2 – 1	Djurgårdens IF	Helsingborg
	Powell 36', 78'	Report	Eskelinen 33'	Stadium: Olympia; Attendance: 10,278

13 May 1996	Djurgårdens IF	2 – 1	IK Oddevold	Stockholm
	Bergqvist 4'; B. Andersson 22'	Report	Vennberg 7'	Stadium: Stockholm Olympic Stadium; Attendance: 2,520

19 May 1996	Degerfors IF	0 – 2	Djurgårdens IF	Degerfors
		Report	Novakovic 39'; Stojcevski 65'	Stadium: Stora Valla; Attendance: 4,039

27 May 1996	Djurgårdens IF	1 – 0	Trelleborgs FF	Stockholm
	Alvén 65'			Stadium: Stockholm Olympic Stadium; Attendance: 3,948

5 June 1996	AIK	1 – 0	Djurgårdens IF	Solna
	Englund 40'	Report		Stadium: Råsunda Stadium; Attendance: 15,371

10 June 1996	Djurgårdens IF	0 – 1	IFK Göteborg	Stockholm
		Report	Andersson 41'	Stadium: Stockholm Olympic Stadium; Attendance: 6,034

16 June 1996	Östers IF	2 – 0	Djurgårdens IF	Växjö
	o.g. 26'; Ernstsson 89'	Report		Stadium: Värendsvallen; Attendance: 2,204

19 June 1996	Djurgårdens IF	2 – 1	Örebro SK	Stockholm
	J. Andersson 62'; Eskelinen 73'	Report	Gudjohnsen 33'	Stadium: Stockholm Olympic Stadium; Attendance: 1,951

26 June 1996	Djurgårdens IF	2 – 2	Umeå FC	Stockholm
	Dahlström 78', 80'	Report	Galloway 35', 37'	Stadium: Stockholm Olympic Stadium; Attendance: 1,500

3 July 1996	Djurgårdens IF	0 – 1	Malmö FF	Stockholm
		Report	Wirmola 46' (pen.)	Stadium: Stockholm Olympic Stadium; Attendance: 3,721

1 August 1996	Malmö FF	2 – 0	Djurgårdens IF	Malmö
	Andersson 7'; Fjellström 18'	Report		Stadium: Malmö Stadion; Attendance: 2,483

11 August 1996	Örebro SK	3 – 0	Djurgårdens IF	Örebro
	Wahlqvist 70'; Sahlin 82'; Zetterlund 88'	Report		Stadium: Eyravallen; Attendance: 5,789

19 August 1996	Djurgårdens IF	4 – 0	Örgryte IS	Stockholm
	Stojcevski 13'; Eskelinen 19' (pen.), 31' (pen.); Pehrsson 61'	Report		Stadium: Stockholm Olympic Stadium; Attendance: 3,548

26 August 1996	IFK Göteborg	3 – 0	Djurgårdens IF	Gothenburg
	Alexandersson 34'; Erlingmark 65'; Andersson 75'	Report		Stadium: Gamla Ullevi; Attendance: 6,122

9 September 1996	IFK Norrköping	2 – 1	Djurgårdens IF	Norrköping
	Samuelsson 56'; Steiner 58'	Report	Langemar 8'	Stadium: Idrottsparken; Attendance: 3,381

15 September 1996	Djurgårdens IF	1 – 1	Halmstads BK	Stockholm
	Novakovic 6'	Report	Ljungberg 46'	Stadium: Stockholm Olympic Stadium; Attendance: 0

18 September 1996	Djurgårdens IF	0 – 2	AIK	Solna
		Report	Nordin 11'; Simpson 38'	Stadium: Råsunda Stadium; Attendance: 11,020

22 September 1996	Trelleborgs FF	3 – 1	Djurgårdens IF	Trelleborg
	Hansson 13'; Karlsson 58'; Sandell 86'	Report	Stojcevski 76'	Stadium: Vångavallen; Attendance: 1,802

30 September 1996	Djurgårdens IF	3 – 2	Degerfors IF	Stockholm
	Jansson 29'; Dahlström 63'; Stojcevski 79'	Report	Radinovic 55'; Rahmberg 90'	Stadium: Stockholm Olympic Stadium; Attendance: 2,055

3 October 1996	IK Oddevold	1 – 2	Djurgårdens IF	Uddevalla
	Larsson 33'	Report	B. Andersson 22'; Stojcevski 73'	Stadium: Rimnersvallen; Attendance: 2,681

12 October 1996	Djurgårdens IF	3 – 1	Helsingborgs IF	Stockholm
	Åslund 6'; Langemar 21'; B. Andersson 34'	Report	Wibrån 53'	Stadium: Stockholm Olympic Stadium; Attendance: 3,874

21 October 1996	Umeå FC	4 – 0	Djurgårdens IF	Umeå
	Galloway 36'; Petrovic 42' (pen.); J. Lundgren 74'; K. Lundgren 86'	Report		Stadium: Gammliavallen; Attendance: 7,263

26 October 1996	Djurgårdens IF	2 – 3	Östers IF	Stockholm
	Dahlström 5', 78'	Report	Eklund 34', 52' (pen.); Ernstsson 68'	Stadium: Stockholm Olympic Stadium; Attendance: 4,263

=== Svenska Cupen ===
==== 1995–96 ====
===== Group stage =====
Pos	Team	Pld	W	D	L	GF	GA	GD	Pts
1	IF Brommapojkarna	3	3	0	0	4	0	+4	9
2	Djurgårdens IF	3	2	0	1	5	2	+3	6
3	Spånga	3	1	0	2	3	2	+1	3
4	Forssa	3	0	0	3	0	8	−8	0

3 February 1996 Matchday 1	Spånga IS	0 – 1	Djurgårdens IF	Stockholm
			Eskelinen	Referee: Gert Nilsson

24 February 1996 Matchday 2	Djurgårdens IF	0 – 2	IF Brommapojkarna	Stockholm
			Johansson; Svensson

6 March 1996 Matchday 3	Djurgårdens IF	4 – 0	Forssa BK	Stockholm
	Löfholm o.g. Bergkvist; Olsen (pen)

==== 1996–97 ====
===== Preliminary rounds =====
22 August 1996 Round 1	Delsbo IF	1 – 14	Djurgårdens IF
	Jonsson 33'	Report	Eskelinen 3', 45', 51', 67'; Karlsson 11', 22'; Langemar 25'; Gröning 29', 31', 37', 61', 75'; Stojcevski 68'; Jansson 86'	Attendance: 1,425

25 September 1996 Round 2	Piteå IF	4 – 3	Djurgårdens IF
	Lundkvist 30'; Sandberg 54', 85'; Andersson 77' (pen.)	Report	Åslund 38'; Pehrsson 58'; Eskelinen 90'	Attendance: 2,000; Referee: Åke Strömberg

=== UEFA Intertoto Cup ===
==== Group stage ====
Pos	Team	Pld	W	D	L	GF	GA	GD	Pts	Qualification	LIN	BRE	DJU	APO	B68
1	(Austria) LASK	4	4	0	0	11	1	+10	12	Advanced to semi-finals	—	—	2–0	2–0	—
2	(Germany) Werder Bremen	4	3	0	1	8	5	+3	9		1–3	—	3–2	—	—
3	(Sweden) Djurgården	4	2	0	2	15	6	+9	6		—	—	—	8–0	5–1
4	(Cyprus) Apollon Limassol	4	1	0	3	4	13	−9	3		—	0–2	—	—	4–1
5	(Faroe Islands) B68 Toftir	4	0	0	4	2	15	−13	0		0–4	0–2	—	—	—

Source: rsssf.com

22 June 1996 Marchday 1	LASK Linz	2 – 0	Djurgårdens IF	Wels
	Westerthaler 41', 88'	Report		Stadium: Union-Stadion

29 June 1996 Matchday 2	Djurgårdens IF	8 – 0	Apollon Limassol	Stockholm
	Eskelinen 2', 75', 86'; Dahlström 7', 20', 58'; B. Andersson 29'; Banda 38'	Report		Stadium: Stockholm Olympic Stadium; Attendance: 650

7 July 1996 Matchday 3	Werder Bremen	3 – 2	Djurgårdens IF	Bremen
	Brand 17'; Hobsch 26'; Pfeifenberger 66'	Report	B. Andersson 3'; Júnior Baiano 9' (o.g.)	Stadium: Weserstadion; Attendance: 19,800

20 July 1996 Matchday 5	Djurgårdens IF	5 – 1	B68 Toftir	Stockholm
	Dahlström (2); Eskelinen (2); Stojcevski	Report	Højgaard	Stadium: Stockholm Olympic Stadium
