= Årets Järnkamin =

Swedish sports award

Årets Järnkamin (literally Iron Stove of the Year) is an award given to a Djurgårdens IF player, or coach, voted by the members of the official supporter club Järnkaminerna (The Iron Stoves). A person who they felt represented the core value of being a true 'Järnkamin' (Iron Stove). It is awarded in both football and ice hockey.

== Winners ==
=== Football ===
- 1993 – (Sweden) Kristoffer Kindbom
- 1994 – (Sweden) Daniel Martinez
- 1995 – (Norway) Thor André Olsen
- 1998 – (Sweden) Michael Borgqvist
- 1999 – (Sweden) Patrik Eriksson-Ohlsson
- 2000 – (Sweden) Mikael Dorsin
- 2001 – (Sweden) Stefan Rehn
- 2002 – (Sweden) Kim Källström
- 2003 – (Sweden) Markus Karlsson
- 2004 – (Sweden) Tobias Hysén
- 2005 – (Sweden) Johan Arneng
- 2006 – (The Gambia) Pa Dembo Touray
- 2007 – (Iceland) Siggi Jónsson
- 2008 – (Finland) Daniel Sjölund
- 2009 – (Sweden) Markus Johannesson
- 2010 – (The Gambia) Pa Dembo Touray (2)
- 2011 – (Sweden) Mattias Jonson
- 2012 – (England) James Keene
- 2013 – (Sweden) Amadou Jawo
- 2014 – (Norway) Kenneth Høie
- 2015 – (Sweden) Kerim Mrabti
- 2016 – The award was not given due to poor performance & 5/5 derby losses.
- 2017 – (Sweden) Magnus Eriksson
- 2018 – (Sweden) Andreas Isaksson
- 2019 – (Sweden) Tommi Vaiho
- 2020 – (Bosnia and Herzegovina) Haris Radetinac
- 2021 – (Sweden) Magnus Eriksson (2)
- 2022 – (Bosnia and Herzegovina) Haris Radetinac (2)
- 2023 – (Sweden) Marcus Danielson

=== Ice hockey ===
- 1999–00 – (Sweden) Mikael Tellqvist
- 2000–01 – (Sweden) Mikael Tellqvist (2)
- 2001–02 – (Sweden) Nils Ekman
- 2002–03 – (Canada) Joaquin Gage
- 2003–04 – (Sweden) Niklas Wikegård
- 2004–05 – (Canada) Dan Boyle
- 2005–06 – (Sweden) Jimmie Ölvestad
- 2006–07 – (Sweden) Fredrik Bremberg
- 2007–08 – (Finland) Ossi Väänänen
- 2008–09 – (Sweden) Marcus Ragnarsson
- 2009–10 – (Sweden) Jimmie Ölvestad (2)
- 2010–11 – (Sweden) Christian Eklund
- 2011–12 – (Sweden) Gustaf Wesslau
- 2012–13 – (Sweden) Kristofer Ottosson
- 2013–14 – (Sweden) Michael Holmqvist
- 2014–15 – (Sweden) Marcus Sörensen
- 2015–16 – (Norway) Patrick Thoresen
- 2016-17 – (Sweden) Daniel Brodin
- 2017-18 – (Sweden) Adam Reideborn
- 2018-19 – (Sweden) Daniel Brodin (2)
- 2019-20 – (Sweden) Henrik Eriksson
- 2020-21 – (Sweden) Nicklas Bergfors
- 2021-22 – The award was not given due to poor performance & relegation from SHL.
- 2022-23 – (Sweden) Marcus Krüger
- 2023-24 – (Sweden) Linus Klasen
