= 2003 Djurgårdens IF season =

Djurgården
2003 season
- Chairman: Bo Lundquist
- Manager: Sören Åkeby & Zoran Lukić
- Stadium: Stockholms Stadion
- Allsvenskan: Winners
- Svenska Cupen: Semi-finals
- Champions League: 2nd qualifying round
- Top goalscorer: League: Kim Källström (14); All: Andreas Johansson (16)
- Highest home attendance: 34,267 (30 June vs Hammarby IF, Allsvenskan)
- Lowest home attendance: 3,381 (16 October vs Assyriska FF, Svenska Cupen)

== Squad information ==
=== Squad ===
Note: Flags indicate national team as defined under FIFA eligibility rules; some limited exceptions apply. Players may hold more than one non-FIFA nationality.

| No. | Pos. | Nation | Player |
|---|---|---|---|
| 2 | DF | SWE | Patrik Eriksson Ohlsson |
| 3 | DF | SWE | Mikael Dorsin |
| 3 | DF | SWE | Fredrik Stenman |
| 4 | DF | SWE | Elias Storm |
| 5 | DF | SWE | Richard Henriksson |
| 6 | MF | SWE | Magnus Pehrsson |
| 6 | DF | FIN | Toni Kuivasto |
| 7 | MF | SWE | Johan Arneng |
| 8 | FW | SWE | Christer Mattiasson |
| 9 | FW | SWE | Johan Elmander (on loan from Feyenoord) |
| 9 | FW | NED | Geert den Ouden |
| 10 | MF | SWE | Andreas Johansson |
| 11 | FW | FIN | Daniel Sjölund |
| 12 | DF | SWE | Markus Karlsson |

| No. | Pos. | Nation | Player |
|---|---|---|---|
| 13 | MF | SWE | Stefan Bergtoft |
| 14 | FW | SWE | Babis Stefanidis |
| 15 | GK | SWE | Andreas Isaksson |
| 16 | MF | SWE | Kim Källström |
| 17 | FW | SWE | Samuel Wowoah |
| 18 | DF | SWE | Niclas Rasck |
| 19 | FW | SWE | Pär Cederqvist |
| 20 | FW | SWE | Jesper Blomqvist |
| 21 | DF | SWE | Richard Spong |
| 22 | FW | GAM | Aziz Corr Nyang |
| 23 | MF | COD | Yannick Bapupa |
| 24 | FW | COD | René Makondele |
| 26 | DF | COD | Blaise Mbemba |
| 30 | GK | GAM | Pa Dembo Touray |

== Player statistics ==
Appearances for competitive matches only

| No. | Pos | Nat | Player | Total | | Allsvenskan | | Svenska Cupen | | Champions League | |
| No. | Pos | Nat | Player | Apps | Goals | Apps | Goals | Apps | Goals | Apps | Goals |
|---|---|---|---|---|---|---|---|---|---|---|---|
| | | (Brazil) BRA | Bruno Carvalho | 0 | 0 | 0 | 0 | 0 | 0 | 0 | 0 |
| | | (Sweden) SWE | Johan Arneng | 30 | 4 | 23 | 2 | 5 | 2 | 2 | 0 |
| | | (Democratic Republic of the Congo) COD | Yannick Bapupa | 15 | 2 | 12 | 1 | 2 | 1 | 1 | 0 |
| | | (Sweden) SWE | Stefan Bergtoft | 21 | 1 | 16 | 0 | 4 | 1 | 1 | 0 |
| | | (Sweden) SWE | Jesper Blomqvist | 10 | 1 | 9 | 1 | 0 | 0 | 1 | 0 |
| | | (Sweden) SWE | Pär Cederqvist | 6 | 1 | 5 | 0 | 1 | 1 | 0 | 0 |
| | | (The Gambia) GAM | Aziz Corr Nyang | 8 | 0 | 5 | 0 | 2 | 0 | 1 | 0 |
| | | (Netherlands) NED | Geert den Ouden | 13 | 10 | 10 | 10 | 1 | 0 | 2 | 0 |
| | | (Sweden) SWE | Mikael Dorsin | 13 | 1 | 12 | 1 | 1 | 0 | 0 | 0 |
| | | (Democratic Republic of the Congo) COD | Richard Ekunde | 0 | 0 | 0 | 0 | 0 | 0 | 0 | 0 |
| | | (Sweden) SWE | Johan Elmander | 13 | 7 | 11 | 7 | 2 | 0 | 0 | 0 |
| | | (Sweden) SWE | Patrik Eriksson-Ohlsson | 11 | 0 | 10 | 0 | 1 | 0 | 0 | 0 |
| | | (Sweden) SWE | Richard Henriksson | 12 | 0 | 8 | 0 | 4 | 0 | 0 | 0 |
| | | (Sweden) SWE | Andreas Isaksson | 30 | 0 | 26 | 0 | 2 | 0 | 2 | 0 |
| | | (Sweden) SWE | Andreas Johansson | 32 | 16 | 26 | 12 | 4 | 3 | 2 | 1 |
| | | (Sweden) SWE | Markus Karlsson | 29 | 0 | 23 | 0 | 4 | 0 | 2 | 0 |
| | | (Finland) FIN | Toni Kuivasto | 17 | 1 | 13 | 1 | 2 | 0 | 2 | 0 |
| | | (Sweden) SWE | Kim Källström | 29 | 15 | 24 | 14 | 3 | 1 | 2 | 0 |
| | | (Democratic Republic of the Congo) COD | René Makondele | 31 | 9 | 24 | 3 | 5 | 5 | 2 | 1 |
| | | (Sweden) SWE | Niclas Rasck | 29 | 2 | 24 | 1 | 3 | 1 | 2 | 0 |
| | | (Finland) FIN | Daniel Sjölund | 23 | 4 | 19 | 3 | 3 | 1 | 1 | 0 |
| | | (Sweden) SWE | Adam Sobkowiak | 0 | 0 | 0 | 0 | 0 | 0 | 0 | 0 |
| | | (Sweden) SWE | Richard Spong | 5 | 0 | 2 | 0 | 3 | 0 | 0 | 0 |
| | | (Sweden) SWE | Babis Stefanidis | 25 | 3 | 20 | 2 | 4 | 1 | 1 | 0 |
| | | (Sweden) SWE | Fredrik Stenman | 15 | 0 | 11 | 0 | 2 | 0 | 2 | 0 |
| | | (Sweden) SWE | Elias Storm | 5 | 0 | 3 | 0 | 2 | 0 | 0 | 0 |
| | | (The Gambia) GAM | Pa Dembo Touray | 3 | 0 | 0 | 0 | 3 | 0 | 0 | 0 |
| | | (Sweden) SWE | Samuel Wowoah | 26 | 7 | 19 | 4 | 5 | 2 | 2 | 1 |

=== Topscorers ===
==== Total ====
| Name | Goals |
|---|---|
| (Sweden) Andreas Johansson | 16 |
| (Sweden) Kim Källström | 15 |
| (Netherlands) Geert den Ouden | 10 |
| (Democratic Republic of the Congo) René Makondele | 9 |
| (Sweden) Johan Elmander | 7 |
| (Sweden) Samuel Wowoah | 7 |
| (Finland) Daniel Sjölund | 4 |
| (Sweden) Johan Arneng | 4 |
| (Sweden) Babis Stefanidis | 3 |
| (Sweden) Niclas Rasck | 2 |
| (Democratic Republic of the Congo) Yannick Bapupa | 2 |
| (Sweden) Niclas Rasck | 2 |
| (Sweden) Stefan Bergtoft | 1 |
| (Sweden) Jesper Blomqvist | 1 |
| (Sweden) Mikael Dorsin | 1 |
| (Finland) Toni Kuivasto | 1 |
| (Sweden) Pär Cederqvist | 1 |

==== Allsvenskan ====
| Name | Goals |
|---|---|
| (Sweden) Kim Källström | 14 |
| (Sweden) Andreas Johansson | 12 |
| (Netherlands) Geert den Ouden | 10 |
| (Sweden) Johan Elmander | 7 |
| (Sweden) Samuel Wowoah | 4 |
| (Finland) Daniel Sjölund | 3 |
| (Democratic Republic of the Congo) René Makondele | 3 |
| (Sweden) Johan Arneng | 2 |
| (Sweden) Babis Stefanidis | 2 |
| (Sweden) Jesper Blomqvist | 1 |
| (Democratic Republic of the Congo) Yannick Bapupa | 1 |
| (Sweden) Mikael Dorsin | 1 |
| (Sweden) Niclas Rasck | 1 |
| (Finland) Toni Kuivasto | 1 |

==== Svenska Cupen ====
| Name | Goals |
|---|---|
| (Democratic Republic of the Congo) René Makondele | 5 |
| (Sweden) Andreas Johansson | 3 |
| (Sweden) Johan Arneng | 2 |
| (Sweden) Samuel Wowoah | 2 |
| (Sweden) Kim Källström | 1 |
| (Democratic Republic of the Congo) Yannick Bapupa | 1 |
| (Sweden) Stefan Bergtoft | 1 |
| (Sweden) Pär Cederqvist | 1 |
| (Sweden) Niclas Rasck | 1 |
| (Finland) Daniel Sjölund | 1 |
| (Sweden) Babis Stefanidis | 1 |

==== Champions League ====
| Name | Goals |
|---|---|
| (Sweden) Andreas Johansson | 1 |
| (Democratic Republic of the Congo) René Makondele | 1 |
| (Sweden) Samuel Wowoah | 1 |

== Competitions ==
=== Allsvenskan ===
==== League table ====
| Pos | Team | Pld | W | D | L | GF | GA | GD | Pts | Qualification or relegation |
|---|---|---|---|---|---|---|---|---|---|---|
| 1 | Djurgårdens IF (C) | 26 | 19 | 1 | 6 | 62 | 26 | +36 | 58 | Qualification to Champions League second qualifying round |
| 2 | Hammarby IF | 26 | 15 | 6 | 5 | 50 | 30 | +20 | 51 | Qualification to UEFA Cup second qualifying round |
| 3 | Malmö FF | 26 | 14 | 6 | 6 | 50 | 23 | +27 | 48 | Qualification to Intertoto Cup first round |
| 4 | Örgryte IS | 26 | 14 | 3 | 9 | 42 | 40 | +2 | 45 | |
| 5 | AIK | 26 | 11 | 6 | 9 | 39 | 34 | +5 | 39 | |

Source: svenskfotboll.se (in Swedish)
Rules for classification: 1) points; 2) goal difference; 3) number of goals scored.
(C) Champions

==== Matches ====
| Date | Venue | Opponents | Score | Djurgården scorers | Attendance |
|---|---|---|---|---|---|
| 2003-04-08 | Värendsvallen | Öster | 4-0 | Källström 19' (pen.), Rasck 27', Wowoah 51', Elmander 88' | 13 215 |
| 2003-04-14 | Stadion | Halmstad | 2-0 | Källström 29', Johansson 67' | 13 023 |
| 2003-04-21 | Stadion | Elfsborg | 5-0 | Stefanidis 28', Elmander 55', Dorsin 59', Sjölund 68', Makondele 82' | 12 537 |
| 2003-04-26 | Eyravallen | Örebro | 0-1 | | 11 126 |
| 2003-05-06 | Stadion | Göteborg | 3-1 | Elmander 71', Källström 86', Makondele 90+4' | 13 726 |
| 2003-05-11 | Enavallen | Enköping | 4-0 | Johansson 3', 29', 30', Källström 62' (pen.) | 9 102 |
| 2003-05-18 | Råsunda | Sundsvall | 2-0 | Johansson 81', Källström 90+2' | 13 114 |
| 2003-05-26 | Olympia | Helsingborg | 1-2 | Källström 58' | 12 899 |
| 2003-06-02 | Råsunda | AIK | 3-3 | Elmander 47', 72', Källström 29' | 35 197 |
| 2003-06-15 | Landskrona IP | Landskrona | 2-1 | Johansson 33', Elmander 68' | 7 242 |
| 2003-06-23 | Stadion | Malmö | 0-2 | | 13 948 |
| 2003-06-30 | Råsunda | Hammarby | 3-0 | Källström 27', 45', Elmander 40' | 34 267 |
| 2003-07-09 | Stadion | Örgryte | 0-3 | | 12 845 |
| 2003-07-17 | Ullevi | Örgryte | 3-0 | den Ouden 49', Johansson 64', Arneng 84' | 25 281 |
| 2003-07-21 | Stadion | Örebro | 3-0 | den Ouden 38', 45+1', Källström 53' | 13 136 |
| 2003-08-02 | Ryavallen | Elfsborg | 2-0 | den Ouden 17', Makondele 69' | 9 118 |
| 2003-08-09 | Stadion | Enköping | 3-2 | Stefanidis 35', den Ouden 59', Källström 81' | 11 017 |
| 2003-09-24 | Ullevi | Göteborg | 0-1 | | 15 052 |
| 2003-08-23 | Stadion | Landskrona | 3-0 | den Ouden 61', 79', Johansson 47' | 12 819 |
| 2003-09-01 | Råsunda | AIK | 2-1 | den Ouden 41', Wowoah 83' | 30 609 |
| 2003-09-16 | Råsunda | Hammarby | 3-2 | Wowoah 29', 32', Sjölund 82' | 35 611 |
| 2003-09-21 | Malmö Stadion | Malmö | 1-2 | Bapupa 81' | 26 812 |
| 2003-09-28 | Stadion | Helsingborg | 1-0 | Kuivasto 66' | 13 815 |
| 2003-10-06 | Idrottsparken | Sundsvall | 4-1 | Källström 25' (pen.), Arneng 44', den Ouden 65', Blomqvist 70' | 7 675 |
| 2003-10-19 | Örjans Vall | Halmstad | 3-2 | Johansson 13', 54', Källström 23' | 10 134 |
| 2003-10-26 | Stadion | Öster | 5-2 | Johansson 54', 69', den Ouden 24', Sjölund 63', Källström 73' | 13 815 |

=== Svenska Cupen ===
| 2 May 2003 Round 2 | Oxelösunds IK | 0 – 7 | Djurgårdens IF | Oxelösund |
| | | Report | | Stadium: Ramdalens IP |

| 29 May 2003 Round 3 | Gefle IF | 0 – 6 | Djurgårdens IF | Borlänge |
| | | Report | | Stadium: Domnarvsvallen |

| 26 June 2003 Round 4 | Malmö FF | 0 – 4 | Djurgårdens IF | Malmö |
| | | Report | | Stadium: Malmö Stadion |

| 2 October 2003 Quarter-final | Djurgårdens IF | 2 – 1 (a.e.t.) | AIK | Stockholm |
| | | Report | | Stadium: Stockholms Stadion |

| 16 October 2003 Semi-final | Djurgårdens IF | 0 – 4 | Assyriska Föreningen | Stockholm |
| | | Report | | Stadium: Stockholms Stadion |

=== Champions League ===
==== 2nd qualifying round ====
| 30 July 2003 | FK Partizan (Serbia and Montenegro) | 1 – 1 | (Sweden) Djurgården | Belgrade |
| | Ilić 59' | UEFA Report | Makondele 72' | Stadium: Partizan Stadium; Attendance: 25,000; Referee: (Hungary) Attila Hanacsek |

| 6 August 2003 | Djurgården (Sweden) | 2 – 2 (3–3 agg.) | (Serbia and Montenegro) FK Partizan | Solna |
| | Johansson 10'; Wowoah 77', | UEFA Report | Ilić 61'; Malbaša 66' (pen.) | Stadium: Råsunda; Attendance: 28,287; Referee: (Russia) Yuri Baskakov |

=== Friendlies ===
| Date | Venue | Opponents | Score | Djurgården scorers | Attendance |
|---|---|---|---|---|---|
| 2003-02-16 | China | (China) Greentown | 3–0 | Sjölund, Cederqvist, Corr Nyang | |
| 2003-02-23 | China | (China) Guangzhou Xiangxue | 2–0 | Corr Nyang 15', Sjölund 62' | |
| 2003-02-25 | China | (China) Yunnan Hongta | 1–1 | Johansson | |
| 2003-03-04 | Graningevallen | FC Café Opera | 1–2 | Sjölund 75' | 2 000 |
| 2003-03-09 | Graningevallen | Brommapojkarna | 3–1 | Eriksson Ohlsson 27', Johansson 39', Wowoah 63' (pen.) | 2 500 |
| 2003-03-18 | Netherlands | (Netherlands) Utrecht | 1–2 | Eriksson Ohlsson 10' | |
| 2003-03-21 | Netherlands | GIF Sundsvall | 1–3 | Bapupa 23' | |
| 2003-03-24 | Netherlands | (Norway) Rosenborg | 0–1 | | |
| 2003-04-01 | Graningevallen | (Finland) MyPa | 0–4 | | |
| 2003-07-24 | Norrtälje Sportcentrum | (England) West Ham | 0–0 | | 7 000 |
| 2003-10-14 | Stockholms Stadion | (Netherlands) Ajax | 0–5 | | |
