= Mikael Dorsin =

Swedish footballer

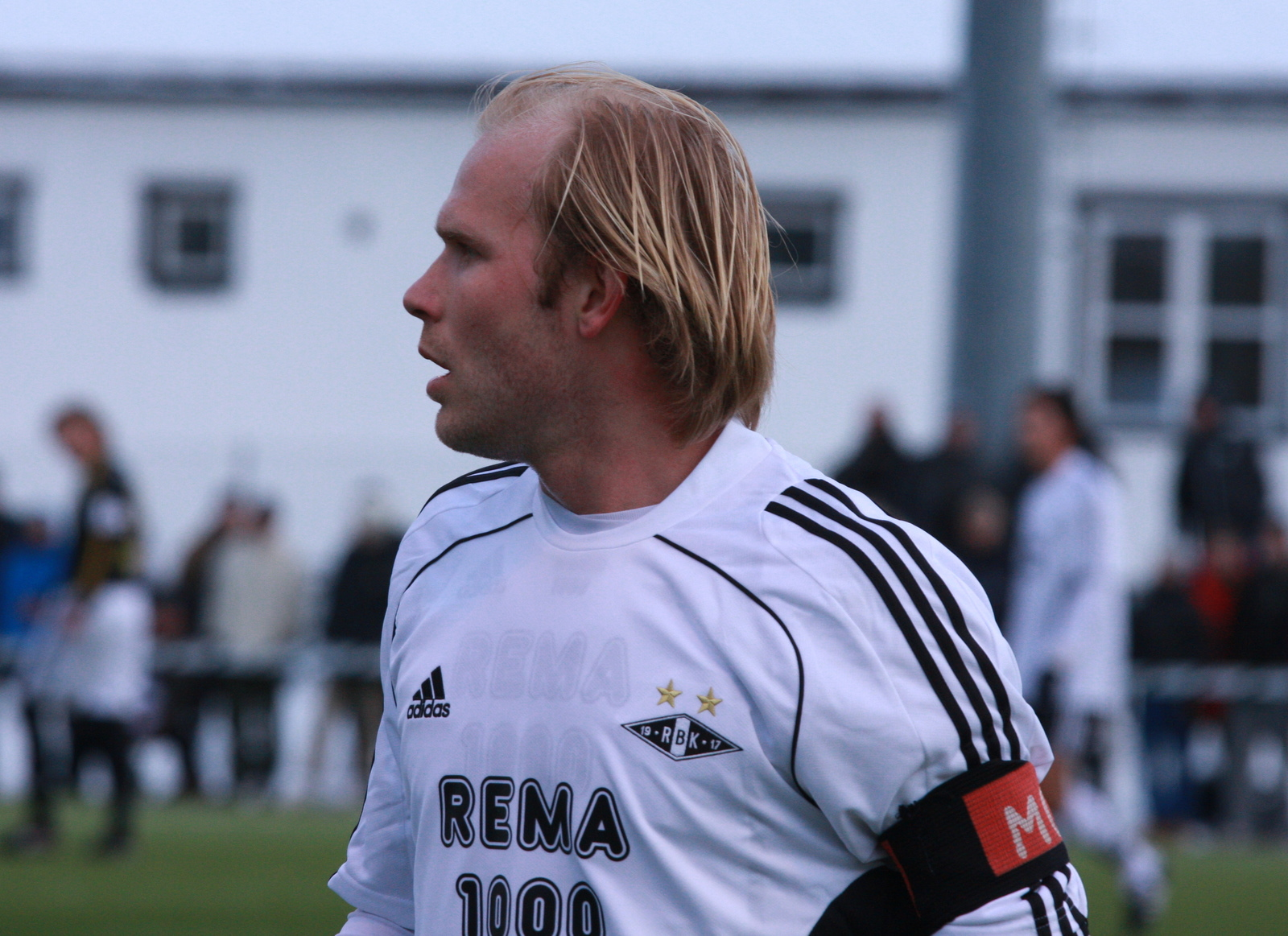

Personal information
- Full name: Mikael Frank Dorsin
- Date of birth: 6 October 1981 (age 45)
- Place of birth: Stockholm, Sweden
- Height: 1.85 m (6 ft 1 in)
- Position: Left-back

Youth career
- IFK Lidingö

Senior career*
Years	Team	Apps	(Gls)
1998–2003	Djurgårdens IF	85	(6)
1999	→ Spårvägens FF (loan)	9	(0)
2003–2004	Strasbourg	20	(0)
2004–2007	Rosenborg	76	(5)
2008	CFR Cluj	8	(1)
2008–2016	Rosenborg	194	(16)
Total		392	(28)

International career
1997–1998	Sweden U16	30	(5)
1999	Sweden U18	10	(1)
2000–2004	Sweden U21	31	(1)
2001–2010	Sweden	16	(0)
- * Club domestic league appearances and goals

Mikael Frank Dorsin (born 6 October 1981) is a Swedish former professional footballer who played as a left-back. He is the current Sporting Director of Rosenborg. Starting his career with Djurgårdens IF in the late 1990s, he went on to represent RC Strasbourg, Rosenborg, and CFR Cluj before retiring from professional football in 2016. A full international between 2001 and 2010, he won 16 caps for the Sweden national team and was a part of their UEFA Euro 2008 squad.

== Club career ==
Dorsin started his career at minor-league IFK Lidingö. After that he played for Djurgårdens IF (until 1999), Spårvägens FF (1999), Djurgårdens IF (2000–2003), RC Strasbourg (2003–2004), Rosenborg BK (2003–2007) and CFR Cluj, before he returned to Rosenborg in August 2008. On 27 May 2016, he decided to hang up his boots at the age of 34 due to a long-term knee injury.

== International career ==
Dorsin played 16 matches for Sweden national team and was a squad player at Euro 2008.

== Personal life ==
Dorsin is the younger brother of Swedish comedian and actor Henrik Dorsin.

== Career statistics ==
=== Club ===
Appearances and goals by club, season and competition
Club	Season	Division	League		Cup		Europe		Total	
Club	Season	Division	Apps	Goals	Apps	Goals	Apps	Goals	Apps	Goals
Djurgården	1998	Division 1 Norra	1	0	0	0	0	0	1	0
Djurgården	2000	Superettan	27	5	3	1	0	0	30	6
Djurgården	2001	Allsvenskan	22	0	1	0	0	0	23	0
Djurgården	2002	Allsvenskan	23	0	4	0	6	0	33	0
Djurgården	2003	Allsvenskan	12	1	1	0	0	0	13	1
Djurgården	Total		85	6	9	1	6	0	100	7
Spårvägen (loan)	1999	Division 1 Norra	9	0	0	0	0	0	9	0
Strasbourg	2003–04	Ligue 1	20	0	0	0	0	0	20	0
Rosenborg	2004	Tippeligaen	7	1	1	0	7	0	15	1
Rosenborg	2005	Tippeligaen	21	1	3	0	10	0	34	1
Rosenborg	2006	Tippeligaen	25	2	5	1	0	0	30	3
Rosenborg	2007	Tippeligaen	23	1	3	0	9	0	35	1
Rosenborg	Total		76	5	12	1	26	0	114	6
CFR Cluj	2008	Liga I	8	1	0	0	0	0	8	1
Rosenborg	2008	Tippeligaen	8	1	0	0	6	0	14	1
Rosenborg	2009	Tippeligaen	27	0	4	0	2	0	33	0
Rosenborg	2010	Tippeligaen	30	4	4	2	12	0	46	6
Rosenborg	2011	Tippeligaen	29	1	4	2	6	1	39	4
Rosenborg	2012	Tippeligaen	28	4	2	0	13	3	43	7
Rosenborg	2013	Tippeligaen	27	2	4	0	4	0	35	2
Rosenborg	2014	Tippeligaen	25	3	3	0	5	0	33	3
Rosenborg	2015	Tippeligaen	20	1	2	0	7	0	29	1
Rosenborg	2016	Tippeligaen	0	0	0	0	0	0	0	0
Rosenborg	Total		194	16	23	4	55	4	172	24
Career total			372	28	44	6	87	4	503	39

=== International ===
Appearances and goals by national team and year
National team	Year	Apps	Goals
Sweden	2001	1	0
Sweden	2002	0	0
Sweden	2003	4	0
Sweden	2004	2	0
Sweden	2005	2	0
Sweden	2006	0	0
Sweden	2007	1	0
Sweden	2008	2	0
Sweden	2009	1	0
Sweden	2010	3	0
Total		16	0

== Honours ==
Djurgårdens IF

- Allsvenskan: 2002, 2003
- Svenska Cupen: 2002
- Superettan: 2000
- Division 1 Norra: 1998

Rosenborg

- Norwegian League: 2004, 2006, 2009, 2010, 2015
- Norwegian Cup: 2015

CFR Cluj

- Romanian League: 2008
- Romanian Cup: 2007-08

Sweden

- King's Cup: 2003

Individual

- Årets Järnkamin: 2000
