= Marcus Olofsson =

Swedish footballer

Personal information
- Date of birth: August 4, 1982 (age 44)
- Place of birth: Söderhamn, Sweden
- Height: 1.82 m (5 ft 11 1/2 in)
- Position: Midfielder

Team information
- Current team: IFK Lidingö FK

Youth career
- Söderhamns FF

Senior career*
Years	Team	Apps	(Gls)
2002–2003	GIF Sundsvall		
2004–?	Friska Viljor FC		
2007–2008	Sandvikens IF		
2009–2012	IFK Mariehamn	109	(5)
2013–2014	Sandvikens IF	39	(3)
2016–2017	Söderhamns FF		
2018–2020	Valbo FF		
2021–	IFK Lidingö FK		
- * Club domestic league appearances and goals as of 29 November 2021

Marcus Olofsson (born August 4, 1982) is a Swedish footballer currently playing for IFK Lidingö FK.
