= Christian Hemberg =

Colombian-born Swedish footballer (born 1981)

Personal information
- Full name: Christian Andres Hemberg
- Date of birth: 6 December 1981 (age 44)
- Place of birth: Cali, Colombia
- Height: 1.72 m (5 ft 8 in)
- Position: Forward

Youth career
- Torestorp IF

Senior career*
| Years | Team | Apps | (Gls) |
| 1998–2006 | Örgryte | 96 | (14) |
| 2007–2008 | Raufoss | 25 | (3) |
| 2008 | KS/Leiftur | 9 | (0) |
| Total | | 130 | (17) |

International career
| 1997–1998 | Sweden U17 | 21 | (2) |
| 1999 | Sweden U19 | 4 | (1) |
| 2001–2002 | Sweden U21 | 3 | (0) |
| 2001 | Sweden | 2 | (0) |
- * Club domestic league appearances and goals

Christian Andres Hemberg (born 6 December 1981) is a Swedish former professional footballer who played as a forward. He played for Örgryte, Raufoss, and KS/Leiftur during a career that spanned between 1998 and 2008. He won two caps for the Sweden national team in 2001.

== Club career ==
Having started off his career with Torestorp IF, he signed with Örgryte IS in 1998 for which he made his Allsvenskan debut at 17 years of age in 1999. He scored 14 Allsvenskan goals in 96 appearances for the Örgryte before signing with the Norwegian second division club Raufoss in early 2007. He retired from professional football after a brief stint in Iceland with KS/Leiftur.

== International career ==
After having appeared for the Sweden U17, U19, and U21 teams, Hemberg made his full international debut for Sweden on 31 January 2001 in a friendly game against the Faroe Islands. He replaced Stefan Ishizaki in the 65th minute as the game ended in a 0–0 draw. He won his second and ultimately last international cap for Sweden in a friendly game on 1 February 2001 as Sweden lost 0–1 to Finland, replacing Sharbel Touma in the 77th minute.

== Personal life ==
He was adopted from an orphanage in Cali, Colombia to Sweden at an early age. After his footballing career he has worked as a personal trainer.
