= Markus Karlsson (footballer, born 1972) =

Swedish footballer

Personal information
- Full name: Bo Markus Karlsson
- Date of birth: 30 August 1972 (age 54)
- Place of birth: Sweden
- Height: 1.86 m (6 ft 1 in)
- Positions: Centre back; left back

Youth career
- Rimbo IF
- BKV Norrtälje

Senior career*
Years	Team	Apps	(Gls)
1992–1993	Rimbo IF		
1993–1995	BKV Norrtälje	55	(15)
1996–2004	Djurgårdens IF	178	(3)
2005	Rot-Weiss Essen	9	(0)
2005–2006	Stabæk IF	26	(0)
2007–2009	IF Brommapojkarna	51	(1)
2013	IFK Lidingö FK	5	(0)
2015	IFK Lidingö BK	1	(0)
2017	IFK Lidingö BK	1	(0)
2022	IFK Lidingö BK	1	(0)

Managerial career
- 2011: Brommapojkarna (ass. coach)
- * Club domestic league appearances and goals

Bo Markus Karlsson (born 30 August 1972) is a Swedish former professional footballer who played as a defender.

== Playing career ==
Magnus Karlsson started his football career as a child in Rimbo IF. In 1993, he joined BKV Norrtälje, which was coached by former Djurgården midfielder Lennart Lundin.

Karlsson joined Djurgården from BKV Norrtälje for the 1996 season as a midfielder. His first season where Djurgården in top-tier Allsvenskan, but then relegated to Division 1 where they remained two seasons, played one more in Allsvenskan and was immediately relegated. When Sören Åkeby och Zoran Lukic took over Djurgården in 1999, Karlsson became left back. When Magnus Samuelsson left the team, he became a central defender.

After Magnus Pehrsson suffered a knee injury before the 2002 season, Karlsson became captain of the team. During the season, his central defender partner Patrik Eriksson-Ohlsson suffered illness and Richard Henriksson took his place. In November 2002, Djurgården clinched the title with Karlsson as the captain of the team. Karlsson was awarded Årets djurgårdare in 2002 for the season. Djurgården also won the cup title, making it a double.

For the 2003 season, Karlsson remained as captain. The team again won the national title. In the end of the 2003, Karlsson was awarded Årets Järnkamin by the Djurgården supporters. During the 2004 season, the club won the 2004 Svenska Cupen.

After nine seasons in Djurgården, two national titles and two cup titles, Karlsson joined German 2. Bundesliga club Rot-Weiss Essen in January 2005 on a one and a half-year contract. After only half a year in Essen, Karlsson continued to Stabæk Fotball on a two and half-year deal. In the summer of 2007, he joined IF Brommapojkarna and again played with Richard Henriksson as companion in the central defence. In 2009, he finished his professional career, although he continued to play with IFK Lidingö.

== Post-football career ==
After his active career, he worked was a coach within IF Brommapojkarna youth academy. During the 2011 season, he was assistant coach to Roberth Björknesjö, who managed the senior side of Brommapojkarna. He also worked as a football agent together with Daniel Breitholtz and Adam Alsing. He then became club director for IFK Lidingö.

== Playing style ==
While at Djurgårdens IF, Karlsson played first as midfielder, then as full back and ended as a central defender. He was known for his tough style.

== Personal life ==
Karlsson married Swedish and Djurgårdens IF footballer Elin Flyborg – both husband and wife were Swedish football champions in the 2003 season. He is the father of Djurgårdens IF footballer Nea Flyborg.

== Career statistics ==
Appearances and goals by club, season and competition
Club	Season	League			National cup		League cup		Continental		Other		Total	
Club	Season	Division	Apps	Goals	Apps	Goals	Apps	Goals	Apps	Goals	Apps	Goals	Apps	Goals
Rimbo IF	1992						—							
Rimbo IF	1993						—							
Rimbo IF	Total		0	0	0	0	—		0	0	0	0	0	0
BKV Norrtälje	1993	Division 2 Östra Svealand	18	5			—						18	5
BKV Norrtälje	1994	Division 2 Östra Svealand	20	5			—						20	5
BKV Norrtälje	1995	Division 2 Östra Svealand	17	5			—						17	5
BKV Norrtälje	Total		55	15	0	0	—		0	0	0	0	55	15
Djurgården	1996	Allsvenskan	20	0		2	—						20	2
Djurgården	1997	Division 1 Norra	13	1			—				2	0	15	1
Djurgården	1998	Division 1 Norra	17	2	2	1	—						19	3
Djurgården	1999	Allsvenskan	20	0		1	—						20	1
Djurgården	2000	Superettan	24	0	1	0	—						25	0
Djurgården	2001	Allsvenskan	23	0	1	0	—						24	0
Djurgården	2002	Allsvenskan	23	0	5	0	—		6	0			34	0
Djurgården	2003	Allsvenskan	23	0	4	0	—		2	0			29	0
Djurgården	2004	Allsvenskan	15	0	2	0	—		5	0	3	0	25	0
Djurgården	Total		178	3	15	4	—		13	0	5	0	211	7
Rot-Weiß Essen	2004–05	2. Bundesliga	9	0									9	0
Rot-Weiß Essen	Total		9	0	0	0	0	0	0	0	0	0	9	0
Stabæk	2005	1. divisjon	7	0	1	0	—						8	0
Stabæk	2006	Tippeligaen	19	0	1	0	—						20	0
Stabæk	Total		26	0	2	0	—		0	0	0	0	28	0
Brommapojkarna	2007	Allsvenskan	13	0			—						13	0
Brommapojkarna	2008	Superettan	22	1			—				2	0	24	1
Brommapojkarna	2009	Allsvenskan	16	0			—						16	0
Brommapojkarna	Total		51	1	0	0	—		0	0	2	0	53	1
IFK Lidingö	2013	Division 4 Mellersta Stockholm					—						0	0
IFK Lidingö	Total		0	0	0	0	—		0	0	0	0	0	0
Career total			304	29	17	4	0	0	13	0	7	0	343	23

== Honours ==
Djurgårdens IF

- Division 1 Norra: 1998
- Superettan: 2000
- Allsvenskan: 2002, 2003
- Svenska Cupen: 2002, 2004

Individual

- Årets Järnkamin: 2003
