= Bo Braastrup Andersen =

Danish footballer and manager (born 1976)

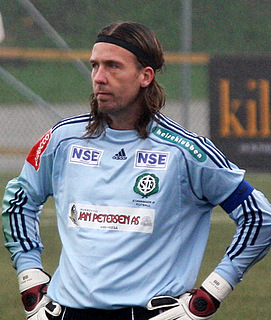

Personal information
- Full name: Bo Braastrup Andersen
- Date of birth: 26 March 1976 (age 50)
- Place of birth: Slagelse, Denmark
- Position: Goalkeeper

Senior career*
Years	Team	Apps	(Gls)
1993–1998	Lyngby FC	120	(0)
1998–2000	Bristol City F.C.	11	(0)
1999	→ Djurgårdens IF (loan)	11	(0)
2000–2002	Viking FK	46	(0)
2002–2003	UD Las Palmas	23	(0)
2003–2005	Køge BK	31	(0)
2005	Tromsø IL	9	(0)
2005	Slagelse B&I		
2007–2009	Stavanger IF		
2010–2012	Sandnes Ulf	68	(0)

Managerial career
- 2013–: Stavanger IF
- * Club domestic league appearances and goals

Bo Braastrup Andersen (born 26 March 1976) is a Danish football manager and former goalkeeper. He is currently managing Stavanger IF.

== Playing career ==
Bo Braastrup Andersen played for Lyngby FC, Bristol City F.C., Djurgårdens IF, Viking FK, UD Las Palmas, Køge BK, Tromsø IL, Slagelse B&I, Stavanger IF, and Sandnes Ulf.

== Management career ==
In January 2013, he took over Stavanger IF. He resigned from Stavanger IF the following December. He was managing Ålgård FK until 2020.

=== Career statistics ===
Club statistics
Club	Season	League			Cup		League Cup		Europe		Total	
Club	Season	Division	Apps	Goals	Apps	Goals	Apps	Goals	Apps	Goals	Apps	Goals
Lyngby FC	1993–94	Superligaen	3	0			—				3	0
Lyngby FC	1994–95	Superligaen	7	0			—				7	0
Lyngby FC	1995–96	Superligaen	33	0			—				33	0
Lyngby FC	1996–97	Superligaen	29	0			—		2	0	31	0
Lyngby FC	1997–98	Superligaen	32	0			—				32	0
Lyngby FC	1998–99	Superligaen	16	0			—				16	0
Lyngby FC	Total		120	0	0	0	—		2	0	122	0
Bristol City	1998–99	First Division	11	0							11	0
Bristol City	Total		11	0	0	0	0	0	0	0	11	0
Djurgården (loan)	1999	Allsvenskan	11	0	1	0	—				12	0
Djurgården (loan)	Total		11	0	1	0	—		0	0	12	0
Bristol City	1999–00	First Division	0	0							0	0
Bristol City	Total		0	0	0	0	0	0	0	0	0	0
Viking	2000	Tippeligaen	0	0			—				0	0
Viking	2001	Tippeligaen	26	0	7	0	—		5	0	38	0
Viking	2002	Tippeligaen	20	0	5	0	—				25	0
Viking	Total		46	0	12	0	—		5	0	63	0
Las Palmas	2002–03	Segunda División	23	0			—				23	0
Las Palmas	Total		23	0	0	0	—		0	0	23	0
Køge	2003–04	1. division	15	0			—				15	0
Køge	2004–05	1. division	16	0			—				16	0
Køge	Total		31	0	0	0	—		0	0	31	0
Tromsø	2005	Tippeligaen	9	0	1	0	—				10	0
Tromsø	Total		9	0	1	0	—		0	0	10	0
Slagelse B&I	2005						—				0	0
Slagelse B&I	Total		0	0	0	0	—		0	0	0	0
Stavanger IF	2006	3. divisjon, avd. 13					—				0	0
Stavanger IF	2007	2. divisjon, avd. 3					—				0	0
Stavanger IF	2008	2. divisjon, avd. 3			1	0	—				1	0
Stavanger IF	2009	1. divisjon	27	0	1	0	—				28	0
Stavanger IF	Total		27	0	2	0	—		0	0	29	0
Sandnes Ulf	2010	1. divisjon	25	0	3	0	—				28	0
Sandnes Ulf	2011	1. divisjon	29	0	3	0	—				32	0
Sandnes Ulf	2012	Tippeligaen	14	0			—				14	0
Sandnes Ulf	Total		68	0	6	0	—		0	0	74	0
Career total			242	0	22	0	0	0	5	0	269	0
