= Jan Eriksson (footballer, born 1967) =

Swedish footballer

Personal information
- Full name: Jan Jonas Jakob Eriksson
- Date of birth: 24 August 1967 (age 59)
- Place of birth: Sundsvall, Sweden
- Height: 1.83 m (6 ft 0 in)
- Position: Defender

Youth career
- 1974–1980: GIF Sundsvall
- 1980–1986: IFK Sundsvall

Senior career*
Years	Team	Apps	(Gls)
1985–1986	IFK Sundsvall	44	(2)
1987–1990	AIK	73	(2)
1991–1992	IFK Norrköping	39	(3)
1992–1994	1. FC Kaiserslautern	37	(4)
1994–1995	AIK	7	(0)
1995–1996	Servette FC	6	(0)
1996	Helsingborgs IF	28	(3)
1997–1998	Sunderland	1	(0)
1998–1999	Tampa Bay Mutiny	35	(2)
Total		270	(16)

International career
1985–1986	Sweden U19	7	(0)
1988–1990	Sweden U21	15	(1)
1990–1994	Sweden	35	(4)
- * Club domestic league appearances and goals

Jan Jonas Jakob "Janne" Eriksson (born 24 August 1967) is a Swedish former professional footballer who played as a defender. Starting off his career with IFK Sundsvall in the mid-1980s, he went on to play professionally in Sweden, Germany, Switzerland, England, and the United States before retiring in 1999. A full international between 1990 and 1994, he won 35 caps for the Sweden national team and participated at the 1990 FIFA World Cup and UEFA Euro 1992. He was also selected for the 1994 FIFA World Cup but had to withdraw because of an injury. He was the recipient of the 1992 Guldbollen as Sweden's best footballer of the year.

== Club career ==
Eriksson played his early football with GIF Sundsvall and IFK Sundsvall before signing with AIK in 1987. In 1992, he signed with IFK Norrköping before moving to the German Bundesliga to play for 1. FC Kaiserslautern. He was awarded Guldbollen in 1992 while playing in Kaiserslautern. He briefly returned to AIK in 1994 before going on to represent Servette FC and Helsingborgs IF between 1995 and 1996.

Eriksson joined English side Sunderland in January 1997, but went on to make only one appearance for the club in a 1–0 defeat at Aston Villa in February 1997. He left the club in May 1998 having made no further appearances. He spent the last two years of his professional career with the Tampa Bay Mutiny in Major League Soccer alongside his former Sweden teammate Thomas Ravelli.

== International career ==
Eriksson played 35 matches and scored four goals for the Sweden national team. Two of those goals came at the 1992 European Championship in Sweden. He was selected for the 1990 FIFA World Cup squad, but did not play. Eriksson was also selected for the Swedish 1994 FIFA World Cup squad but had to leave the team just before the start of the tournament because of an injury and was replaced by Teddy Lucic.

== Personal life ==
Eriksson's father Jan-Åke Eriksson and younger brother Patrik Eriksson-Ohlsson are also former footballers.

== Career statistics ==
=== International ===
Appearances and goals by national team and year
National team	Year	Apps	Goals
Sweden	1990	5	0
Sweden	1991	8	1
Sweden	1992	11	2
Sweden	1993	7	1
Sweden	1994	4	0
Total		35	4

Scores and results list Sweden's goal tally first, score column indicates score after each Eriksson goal.

List of international goals scored by Jan Eriksson
No.	Date	Venue	Opponent	Score	Result	Competition	Ref.
1	9 October 1991	Stadion Allment, Lucerne, Switzerland	Switzerland	1–3	1–3	Friendly	
2	10 June 1992	Råsunda Stadium, Solna, Sweden	France	1–0	1–1	UEFA Euro 1992	
3	17 June 1992	Råsunda Stadium, Solna, Sweden	England	1–1	2–1	UEFA Euro 1992	
4	19 May 1993	Råsunda Stadium, Solna, Sweden	Austria	1–0	1–0	1994 FIFA World Cup qualifier	

== Honours ==
Individual

- Guldbollen: 1992
- Stor grabb: 1992
- MLS All-Star, 1998
