= Sharbel Touma =

Swedish football player and manager

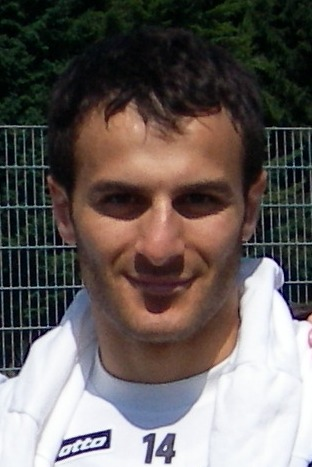
- Touma in 2007

Personal information
- Full name: Sharbel Touma
- Date of birth: 25 March 1979 (age 47)
- Place of birth: Beirut, Lebanon
- Height: 1.78 m (5 ft 10 in)
- Position: Winger

Youth career
- 1989–1992: Motala
- 1992–1994: Syrianska

Senior career*
Years	Team	Apps	(Gls)
1994–1995	Syrianska	1	(0)
1995–1999	Djurgården	46	(9)
1999–2001	AIK	29	(4)
2002–2005	Halmstad	68	(20)
2005–2007	FC Twente	79	(18)
2007–2009	Borussia Mönchengladbach	17	(3)
2009–2010	Iraklis	8	(0)
2010–2011	Djurgården	26	(5)
2011–2014	Syrianska	72	(18)
2017	Syrianska	1	(0)
Total		347	(77)

International career
1994	Sweden U16	1	(0)
1995–1997	Sweden U18	8	(1)
1999–2001	Sweden U21	5	(1)
2001–2004	Sweden	2	(0)

Managerial career
- 2017: Syrianska
- * Club domestic league appearances and goals

Sharbel Touma (born 25 March 1979) is a former professional footballer who played as a winger. Born in Lebanon, he played for the Sweden national team.

Beginning his career with Syrianska in the mid-1990s, he went on to represent Djurgårdens IF, AIK, Halmstad, Twente, Borussia Mönchengladbach, and Iraklis before returning to Syrianska in 2011 to wrap up his career.

== Early life ==
Touma was born in Beirut, Lebanon, and is of Syriac (Assyrian/Aramean) origin. He moved to Sweden at a young age and was granted Swedish citizenship.

== Club career ==
Touma made his senior debut for Syrianska FC in the 1994 Division 2. He joined Djurgårdens IF, where he won the PSM för klubblag with the under-16 squad. He debuted in the senior team in the 1997 season.

He later played for AIK, Halmstads BK and F.C. Twente. He won "the Big Silver" (Stora Silvret in Swedish, second place in the Swedish top league, Allsvenskan) with Halmstads BK 2004 and left them for FC Twente. On 4 November 2008 was suspended and called up for the second team from Borussia Mönchengladbach between December 2008, he also release the club in July 2009 to sign with Iraklis.

Touma was on a trial with the Norwegian football club Rosenborg BK and on 22 March 2010 Touma returned from Iraklis to his mother club Djurgårdens IF of the Allsvenskan. He played from 1997–99 in Stockholm and scored 10 goals in 48 matches.

In 2017, Touma re-joined Syrianska, playing one league match.

== International career ==
A youth international for the Sweden U16, U18, and U21 teams, Touma made his full international debut for Sweden on 1 February 2001 in a friendly 0–1 loss against Finland when he played for 77 minutes before being replaced by Christian Hemberg. He won his second and final cap on 17 October 2004 in a friendly 4–1 win against Scotland, coming on as a substitute for Christian Wilhelmsson in the 76th minute.

== Managerial career ==
In 2024, Touma was appointed head coach of Syrianska.

== Personal life ==
Touma is married and has two children: Phillip and Isabelle. He is related to footballers Jimmy Durmaz, David Durmaz, and Charbel Georges.

== Career statistics ==
=== Club ===
Appearances and goals by club, season and competition
Club	Season	League			National cup		League cup		Europe		Other		Total	
Club	Season	Division	Apps	Goals	Apps	Goals	Apps	Goals	Apps	Goals	Apps	Goals	Apps	Goals
Syrianska FC	1994	Division 2 Östra Svealand	1	0			—						1	0
Djurgården	1997	Division 1 Norra	8	0		1	—		–	–			8	1
Djurgården	1998	Division 1 Norra	14	1	1	0	—		–	–			15	1
Djurgården	1999	Allsvenskan	24	8			—		–	–			24	8
Djurgården	Total		46	9	1	1	—		0	0	0	0	47	10
AIK	2000	Allsvenskan	4	0	0	0	—						4	0
AIK	2001	Allsvenskan	25	4	4	3	—		5	0			34	7
AIK	Total		29	4	4	3	—		5	0	0	0	38	7
Halmstads BK	2002	Allsvenskan	22	6			—						22	6
Halmstads BK	2003	Allsvenskan	20	4			—						20	4
Halmstads BK	2004	Allsvenskan	26	10			—				1	0	26	10
Halmstads BK	Total		68	20	0	0	—		0	0	1	0	69	20
FC Twente	2004–05	Eredivisie	19	4			—						19	4
FC Twente	2005–06	Eredivisie	28	5			—				6	1	34	6
FC Twente	2006–07	Eredivisie	32	9			—		4	3	1	0	37	12
FC Twente	Total		79	18	0	0	—		4	3	7	1	90	22
Borussia Mönchengladbach	2007–08	2. Bundesliga	16	3	1	0							17	3
Borussia Mönchengladbach	2008–09	Bundesliga	1	0	1	0	—						2	0
Borussia Mönchengladbach	Total		17	3	2	0	0	0	0	0	0	0	19	3
Iraklis	2009–10	Super League	8	0			—						8	0
Djurgården	2010	Allsvenskan	26	5	0	0	—						26	5
Syrianska FC	2011	Allsvenskan	24	5			—				2	0	26	5
Syrianska FC	2012	Allsvenskan	25	8	1	2	—						26	10
Syrianska FC	2013	Allsvenskan	17	3			—						17	3
Syrianska FC	2014	Superettan	6	2	1	0	—						7	2
Syrianska FC	2017	Superettan	1	0	—		—		—		—		1	0
Syrianska FC	Total		73	18	2	2	—		0	0	1	0	77	20
Career total			347	77	9	6	0	0	9	3	10	1	375	87

=== International ===
Appearances and goals by national team and year
National team	Year	Apps	Goals
Sweden	2001	1	0
Sweden	2002	0	0
Sweden	2003	0	0
Sweden	2004	1	0
Total		2	0

== Honours ==
Djurgårdens IF

- Division 1 Norra: 1998

FC Twente

- UEFA Intertoto Cup: 2006

Borussia Mönchengladbach

- 2. Bundesliga: 2007–08
