= Johan Norell =

Swedish footballer

Personal information
- Date of birth: September 29, 1981 (age 45)
- Height: 1.80 m (5 ft 11 in)
- Position: Defender

Senior career*
Years	Team	Apps	(Gls)
2000–2002	IK Brage		
2003–2004	Enköpings SK FK		
2005–2008	Landskrona BoIS		
- * Club domestic league appearances and goals

Johan Norell (born 29 September 1981) is a Swedish retired football defender.
