= Pa Dembo Touray =

Gambian footballer

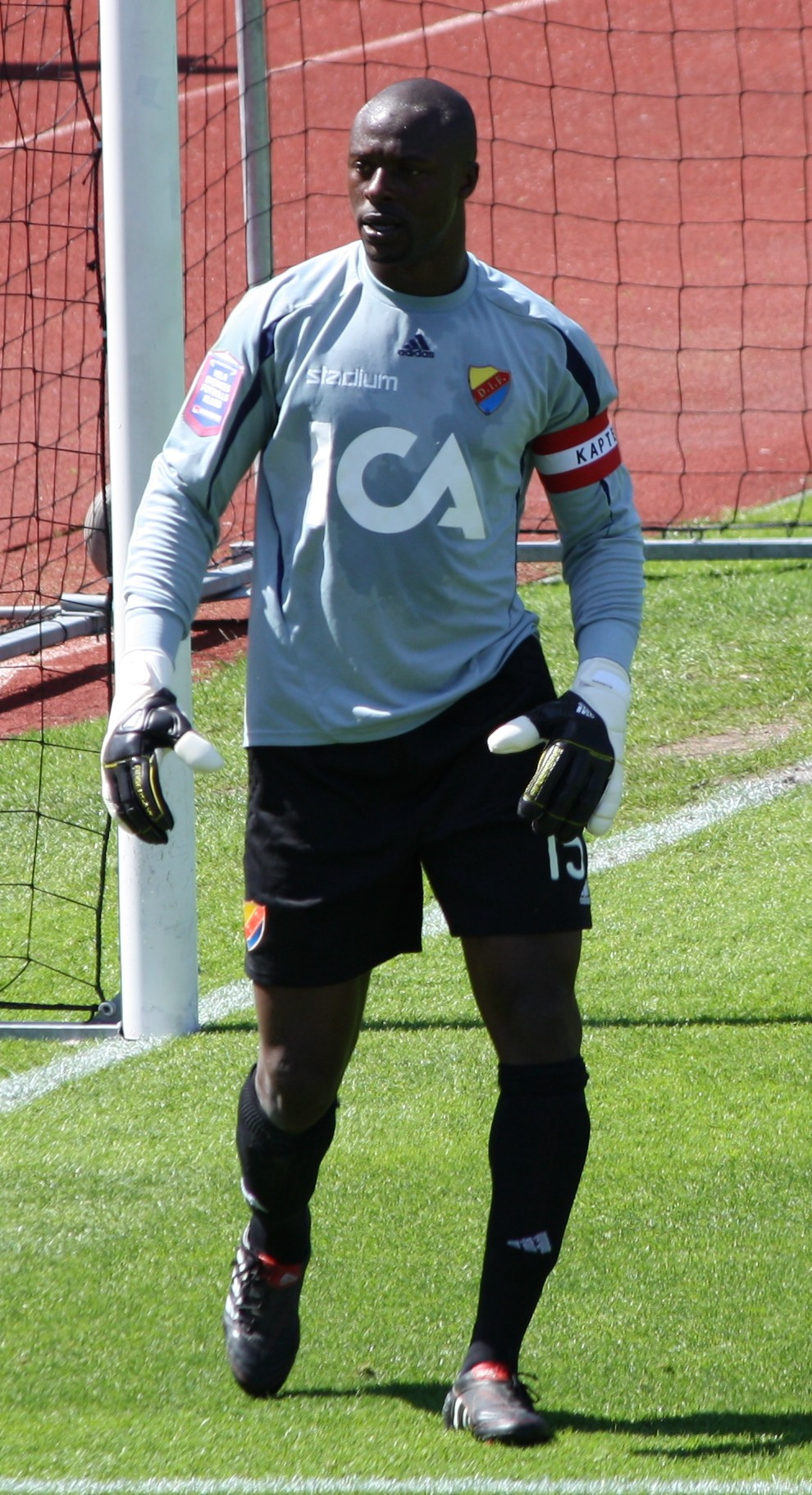
- Touray playing for Djurgården

Personal information
- Full name: Pa Dembo Touray
- Date of birth: 31 March 1980 (age 46)
- Place of birth: Banjul, Gambia
- Height: 2.00 m (6 ft 6 1/2 in)
- Position: Goalkeeper

Team information
- Current team: Prespa Birlik (Goalkeeper coach)

Senior career*
Years	Team	Apps	(Gls)
1996–1998	Sait Matty FC		
1998–2000	Real Banjul		
2000–2011	Djurgården	195	(1)
2001–2002	→ Assyriska FF (loan)	59	(0)
2004	→ Vålerenga IF (loan)	11	(0)
2012–2015	Engen Santos	62	(0)
2015	Vasalunds IF	0	(0)
2016	IFK Lidingö		

International career
2005–2014	Gambia	25	(0)

Managerial career
- 2016: IFK Lidingö (goalkeeper coach)
- 2017–: Prespa Birlik (goalkeeper coach)
- * Club domestic league appearances and goals as of 31 December 2017

Pa Dembo Touray (born 31 March 1980,), is the goalkeeper coach of Prespa Birlik. He is a former Gambian football goalkeeper and national team player for Gambia.

== Club career ==
Touray, an English spelling of the name "Touré", began his footballing career with Real de Banjul F.C. in Gambia. In 2000, he moved to Stockholm in Sweden to play for Djurgårdens IF in the highest domestic league, Allsvenskan. Touray spent two respective loan spells with Assyriska FF and Vålerenga IF before returning to Djurgårdens IF following the sale of Swedish international goalkeeper Andreas Isaksson.

After Isaksson's departure, Touray was handed an extended run in the team, and since maintained his position as first-choice goalkeeper at the club. He was also rewarded with the club captaincy after several seasons of consistency and following the 2011 season was selected as the top goalkeeper in the Allsvenskan. At the conclusion of the 2011 season, after a decade at Djurgårdens IF Touray left the club having appeared in 195 league matches.

Touray is a fan-favorite of Djurgårdens IF, having stayed at the club for more than a decade & during one of the club's successful spells. Touray is also known for singing the West African song "Kamala, Kamala Vesta" as a victory chant, sung by Touray & repeated by the singing stand, which has become a tradition for the club ever since.

== International career ==
Touray has been capped 25 times for Gambia.

== Career statistics ==
As of match played 5 September 2014.

Club statistics
Club	Season	League			Cup		Europe		Other		Total	
Club	Season	Division	Apps	Goals	Apps	Goals	Apps	Goals	Apps	Goals	Apps	Goals
Real Banjul	1998–99		0	0							0	0
Real Banjul	1999–00		0	0							0	0
Real Banjul	Total		0	0	0	0	0	0	0	0	0	0
Djurgården	2000	Superettan	1	0	2	0					3	0
Djurgården	Total		1	0	2	0	0	0	0	0	3	0
Assyriska (loan)	2001	Superettan	29	0							29	0
Assyriska (loan)	2002	Superettan	30	0							30	0
Assyriska (loan)	Total		59	0	0	0	0	0	0	0	59	0
Djurgården	2003	Allsvenskan	0	0	3	0	0	0			3	0
Djurgården	Total		0	0	3	0	0	0	0	0	3	0
Vålerenga (loan)	2004	Tippeligaen	11	0							11	0
Vålerenga (loan)	Total		11	0	0	0	0	0	0	0	11	0
Djurgården	2004	Allsvenskan	17	0	3	0	6	0	3	0	29	0
Djurgården	2005	Allsvenskan	26	1	1	0	2	0	2	0	31	1
Djurgården	2006	Allsvenskan	25	0	2	0	2	0	5	0	34	0
Djurgården	2007	Allsvenskan	26	0	0	0					26	0
Djurgården	2008	Allsvenskan	23	0	2	0	4	0			29	0
Djurgården	2009	Allsvenskan	25	0	1	0			2	0	28	0
Djurgården	2010	Allsvenskan	23	0	0	0					23	0
Djurgården	2011	Allsvenskan	29	0	2	0					31	0
Djurgården	Total		194	1	11	0	14	0	12	0	231	1
Engen Santos	2011–12	National First Division	14	0	2	0			4	0	20	0
Engen Santos	2012–13	National First Division	28	0	1	0			3	0	32	0
Engen Santos	2013–14	National First Division	8	0	2	0					10	0
Engen Santos	2014–15	National First Division	2	0							2	0
Engen Santos	Total		52	0	5	0	0	0	7	0	64	0
Career total			317	1	21	0	14	0	19	0	371	1

== Honours ==
Djurgårdens IF

- Superettan: 2000
- Allsvenskan: 2003, 2005
- Svenska Cupen: 2004, 2005

Individual

- Årets Järnkamin: 2006, 2010
