= Magnus Lundqvist =

Swedish cartographer

- Born: 1891
- Died: 1985 (aged 93–94)
- Citizenship: Sweden
- Scientific career
- Fields: Cartography
- Workplaces: Kartografiska institutet

Magnus Lundqvist (1891–1985) was a Swedish cartographer who was the founder and director of the company Kartografiska institutet. Lundqvist did also serve as member of the board of the Swedish Society for Anthropology and Geography.

== Sources ==
- Wennström, Hans-Fredik. "Magnus Lundqvist". Nationalencyklopedin (in Swedish). Cydonia Development.
