= Joel Riddez =

Swedish footballer and coach

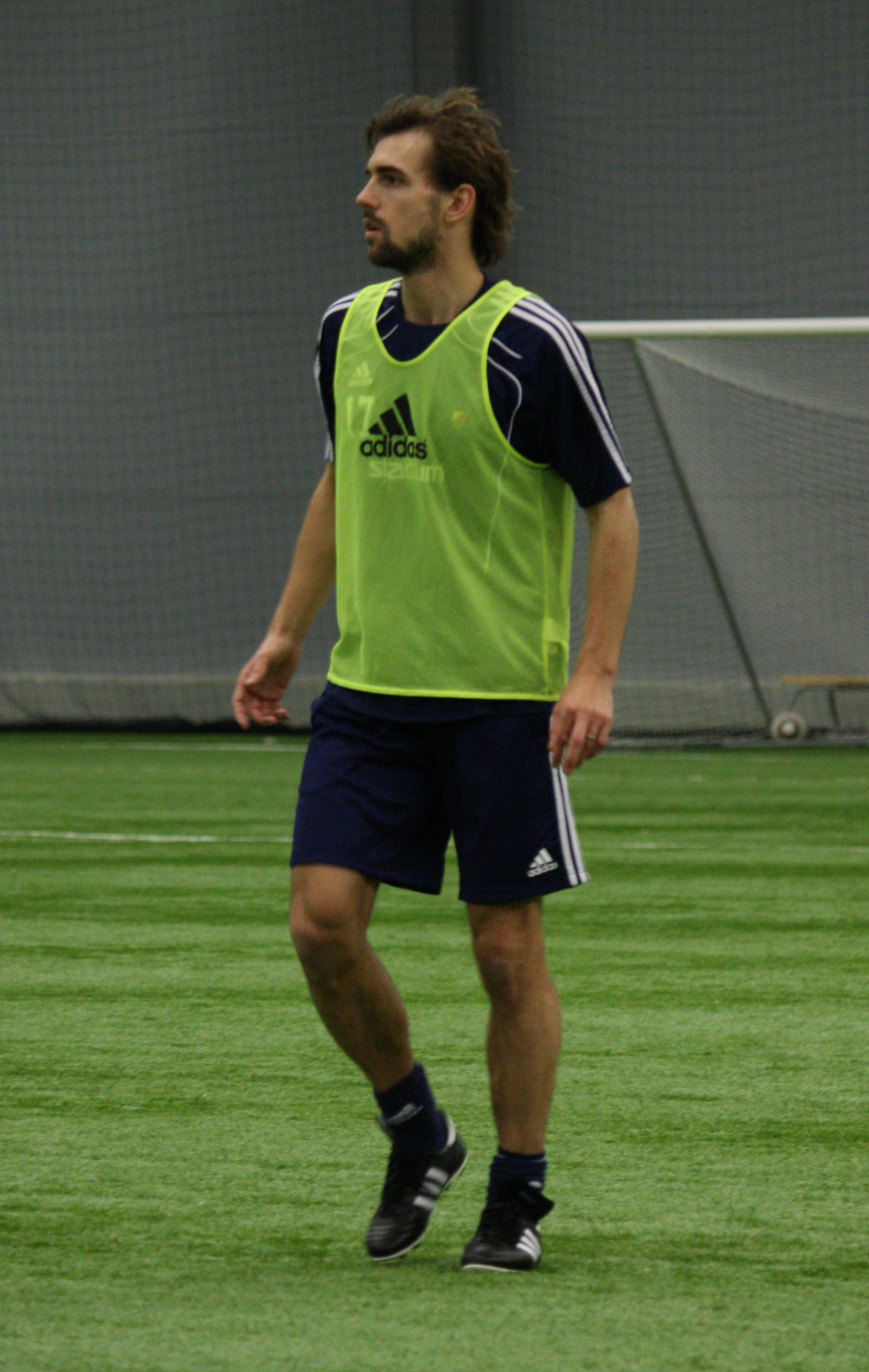
- Riddez in January 2011

Personal information
- Full name: Joel Michel Riddez
- Date of birth: 21 May 1980 (age 46)
- Place of birth: Stockholm, Sweden
- Height: 1.82 m (6 ft 0 in)
- Position: Full back

Youth career
- Spårvägen
- Djurgården

Senior career*
Years	Team	Apps	(Gls)
1999–2001	Djurgården	37	(1)
2001	→ Assyriska (loan)	12	(1)
2002–2003	Assyriska	59	(10)
2004–2007	Örebro	69	(1)
2008–2010	Strømsgodset	74	(1)
2011–2013	Djurgården	21	(0)
2014	IK Frej	25	(1)
Total		297	(15)

International career
1995–1997	Sweden U17	6	(0)
1998–1999	Sweden U19	8	(0)

Managerial career
- 2014–2016: IK Frej (assistant)
- 2016: Assyriska (assistant)
- 2017–2019: Djurgården (women)
- * Club domestic league appearances and goals

Joel Michel Riddez (born 21 May 1980) is a Swedish football coach and former professional player. He was in charge of Swedish Damallsvenskan club Djurgårdens IF between 2017 and 2019. Riddez previously played for Swedish sides Djurgården, Assyriska, and Örebro, as well as Norwegian side Strømsgodset IF. He was capped for the Sweden U17 and U19 teams between 1995 and 1999.
