= Roger Lundin =

Swedish football manager

Managerial career
- Years: Team
- 1997: Djurgårdens IF

Roger Lundin is a Swedish football manager. He was Djurgårdens IF manager in 1997.
