= Johan Andersson (footballer, born 1974) =

Swedish footballer

Personal information
- Full name: Johan Herman Andersson
- Date of birth: 30 October 1974 (age 52)
- Place of birth: Umeå, Sweden
- Height: 1.88 m (6 ft 2 in)
- Position: Defender

Youth career
- Gröndals IK

Senior career*
| Years | Team | Apps | (Gls) |
| 1993–1997 | Djurgårdens IF | 104 | (12) |
| 1998–2004 | Hammarby IF | 118 | (10) |
| 2004–2006 | GIF Sundsvall | 39 | (0) |
| 2007 | Gröndals IK | | |
| 2008 | BK Saturnus | | |

International career
| 1995 | Sweden B | 1 | (0) |
- * Club domestic league appearances and goals

Johan Herman Andersson (born 30 October 1974) is a Swedish former footballer who played as a defender. He made 42 Allsvenskan appearances for Djurgårdens IF, and scored three goals, 118 for Hammarby IF (ten goals), and 39 for GIF Sundsvall (no goals).

== Club career ==
Andersson started his career in Gröndals IK and joined Djurgårdens IF Fotboll in the age of twelve. In 1998, he joined rival Hammarby IF to play in Allsvenskan. In Hammarby, he was a part of the 2001 Allsvenskan winning team. In 2004, he moved to GIF Sundsvall.

In 2007, Andersson joined his mother club Gröndals IK for matches in Division 1 Norra.

== International career ==
He appeared once for the Sweden national football B team in 1995.

== Honours ==
Djurgårdens IF

- Division 1 Norra: 1994

Hammarby IF

- Allsvenskan: 2001
