= Bårsta IP =

Sports venue in Södertälje, Sweden

Coordinates: 59°12′08″N 17°36′17″E

Bårsta IP is a stadium in Södertälje, Sweden. The stadium is best known for having been the stadium of football club Assyriska until late 2005. It was the club's home stadium during their sole season in Sweden's top football division Allsvenskan in 2005. The record attendance is 7620 which was set at a match between Assyriska and GIF Sundsvall in a promotion play-off in 1999. Assyriska has since moved on to Södertälje Fotbollsarena which was built in late 2005. The stadium is no longer well maintained but is still used by the Assyriska youth squad and Nya Södertälje KFF.
