= 2000 Superettan =

Superettan
- Season: 2000
- Champions: Djurgården
- Promoted: Djurgården; Malmö FF
- Relegated: Åtvidaberg; Panos Ljungskile; Gunnilse
- Matches played: 240

The 2000 Superettan was part of the 2000 Swedish football season, and the first season of Superettan, Sweden's second-tier football division in its current format. A total of 16 teams contested the league.

== Overview ==
It was contested by 16 teams, and Djurgårdens IF won the championship.

== League table ==
Pos	Team	Pld	W	D	L	GF	GA	GD	Pts	Promotion, qualification or relegation
1	Djurgårdens IF (C, P)	30	20	3	7	68	32	+36	63	Promotion to Allsvenskan
2	Malmö FF (P)	30	18	6	6	47	33	+14	60	Promotion to Allsvenskan
3	Mjällby AIF	30	15	8	7	56	31	+25	53	Qualification to Promotion playoffs
4	Landskrona BoIS	30	16	4	10	59	37	+22	52	
5	Västerås SK	30	14	9	7	50	39	+11	51	
6	Café Opera United	30	13	7	10	53	44	+9	46	
7	Enköpings SK	30	11	7	12	23	31	−8	40	
8	IK Brage	30	10	9	11	36	41	−5	39	
9	IF Sylvia	30	10	7	13	47	54	−7	37	
10	Kalmar FF	30	9	8	13	40	42	−2	35	
11	Assyriska FF	30	9	8	13	36	40	−4	35	
12	Östers IF	30	9	6	15	39	51	−12	33	
13	Umeå FC	30	9	6	15	30	48	−18	33	
14	Åtvidabergs FF (R)	30	7	11	12	37	46	−9	32	Relegation to Division 2
15	Panos Ljungskile (R)	30	6	9	15	31	55	−24	27	Relegation to Division 2
16	Gunnilse (R)	30	6	8	16	26	54	−28	26	Relegation to Division 2

Rules for classification: 1) points; 2) goal difference; 3) number of goals scored.
(C) Champions; (P) Promoted; (R) Relegated

== Season statistics ==
=== Top scorers ===
Rank	Player	Club	Goals
1	(Sweden) Markus Ringberg	Mjällby AIF	18
2	(Sweden) Fredrik Gärdeman	Åtvidabergs FF	14
3	(Sweden) Zlatan Ibrahimović	Malmö FF	12
4	(Sweden) Tomas Westerinen	IK Brage	11
4	(Liberia) Samuel Wowoah	Djurgårdens IF	11
4	(Sweden) Danijel Milovanovic	Landskrona BoIS	11
4	(Sweden) Håkan Söderstjerna	Landskrona BoIS	11
8	(Sweden) Pierre Gallo	Djurgårdens IF	10
8	(Sweden) Andreas Tell	Gunnilse IS	10
8	(Sweden) Håkan Lindqvist	Kalmar FF	10
8	(Sweden) Daniel Mobaeck	Kalmar FF	10
8	(Sweden) Peter Markstedt	Västerås SK	10
