= Daniel Martinez (footballer, born 1973) =

Swedish footballer (born 1973)

Personal information
- Full name: Göran Daniel Martinez Olsson
- Date of birth: 9 January 1973 (age 53)
- Place of birth: Stockholm, Sweden
- Height: 1.74 m (5 ft 9 in)
- Position: Midfielder

Senior career*
Years	Team	Apps	(Gls)
1992–1995	Djurgårdens IF	55	(8)
1994–1996	Racing de Ferrol	13	(2)
1996–1997	Elche	14	(0)
1997–1998	Guadix	21	(1)
1998	Djurgårdens IF	14	(2)
1998–2001	Universidad	66	(3)
2001–2002	Ceuta	26	(1)
2002–2003	Torredonjimeno	32	(4)
2003–2004	Serrallo		
2004–2006	Linense		
2006–2007	Ceuta	9	(0)
2007–2008	Puerto Real		

International career
1988–1989	Sweden U17	11	(0)
- * Club domestic league appearances and goals

Göran Daniel "Dani" Martinez Olsson (born 9 January 1973) is a Swedish former professional footballer who played as a midfielder for Djurgårdens IF, Racing Club de Ferrol, Elche, Guadix, Universidad, Ceuta, Torredonjimeno, Linense, and Puerto Real. He played 19 Allsvenskan matches for Djurgårdens IF. He appeared 11 times for the Sweden U17 team.
