= Michael Borgqvist =

Swedish footballer and manager

Personal information
- Full name: Michael Vitalis Borgqvist
- Date of birth: 17 December 1967 (age 58)
- Place of birth: Stockholm, Sweden
- Position: Midfielder

Youth career
- 1973–1974: Vårberg/Skärholmens SK
- 1975–1981: IFK Stockholm
- 1982: Brinkens IF
- 1983–1987: AIK

Senior career*
Years	Team	Apps	(Gls)
1987–1990	Spårvägens FF		
1991–1995	AIK	91	(4)
1996	Spårvägens FF		
1997–1999	Djurgårdens IF		
2000–2003	Assyriska		
2005	Enköpings SK		

Managerial career
- 2005–2006: Enköpings SK
- 2008: Assyriska
- 2009–2010: Hammarby IF
- * Club domestic league appearances and goals

Michael Borgqvist (born 17 December 1967 in Stockholm, Sweden) is a Swedish football manager and former football player. He is currently without a club after most recently leaving Hammarby IF in Superettan.

Borgqvist was a notable football player with over 100 games played in the Swedish highest league Allsvenskan. He has played for both AIK and Djurgårdens IF from Stockholm. He won the Swedish Allsvenskan with AIK 1992. He has also played for Assyriska FF and Enköpings SK, where he ended his playing career in 2003. Borgqvist played as a midfielder.

After ending his career in 2003, he started a managing career with taking over his most recent club Enköpings SK in 2005. After a few years in the club he quit in 2006. In 2008, he moved on to become the trainer of Assyriska FF in Superettan. He only stayed for a short time in the club. In December 2009, he was appointed as the new manager for newly relegated Hammarby IF in Superettan. Jesper Blomqvist was appointed as his assistant manager.

== Honours ==
=== Club ===
Djurgårdens IF

- Division 1 Norra (1): 1998
