= Jon Persson =

Swedish footballer

Personal information
- Date of birth: 31 May 1976 (age 50)
- Height: 1.82 m (6 ft 0 in)
- Position: Defender

Senior career*
Years	Team	Apps	(Gls)
–2009	Brommapojkarna		
- * Club domestic league appearances and goals

Jon Persson (born 31 May 1976) is a Swedish former professional footballer who played as a defender. Persson made 33 Allsvenskan appearances for IF Brommapojkarna and scored five goals.
