= Magnus Samuelsson (footballer, born 1971) =

Swedish footballer (born 1971)

Personal information
- Date of birth: 21 May 1971 (age 55)
- Height: 1.84 m (6 ft 0 in)
- Position: Defender

Senior career*
Years	Team	Apps	(Gls)
–1991	Boden		
1992–1997	Luleå		
1998	Öster	25	(0)
1999–2001	Djurgården		
2002	Lahti		
2003–2007	Örebro		
2007	→ Raufoss (loan)	10	(0)
2008	Degerfors		
- * Club domestic league appearances and goals

Magnus Samuelsson (born 21 May 1971) is a Swedish former professional footballer who played as a defender.
