= Fred Persson =

Swedish footballer

Personal information
- Full name: Fred Viktor Persson
- Date of birth: 22 August 1973 (age 53)
- Position: Midfielder

Youth career
- Bro IK

Senior career*
Years	Team	Apps	(Gls)
- Bro IK
1992–1998	Djurgårdens IF		

International career
	Sweden U16	17	(0)
	Sweden U18	10	(0)
1994	Sweden U21	1	(0)
- * Club domestic league appearances and goals

Fred Viktor Persson (born 22 August 1973) is a Swedish former professional footballer who played as a midfielder. He made 54 Allsvenskan appearances for Djurgårdens IF and scored three goals.
