= Värendsvallen =

Sports venue in Växjö, Sweden

Coordinates: 56°52′52″N 14°46′19″E

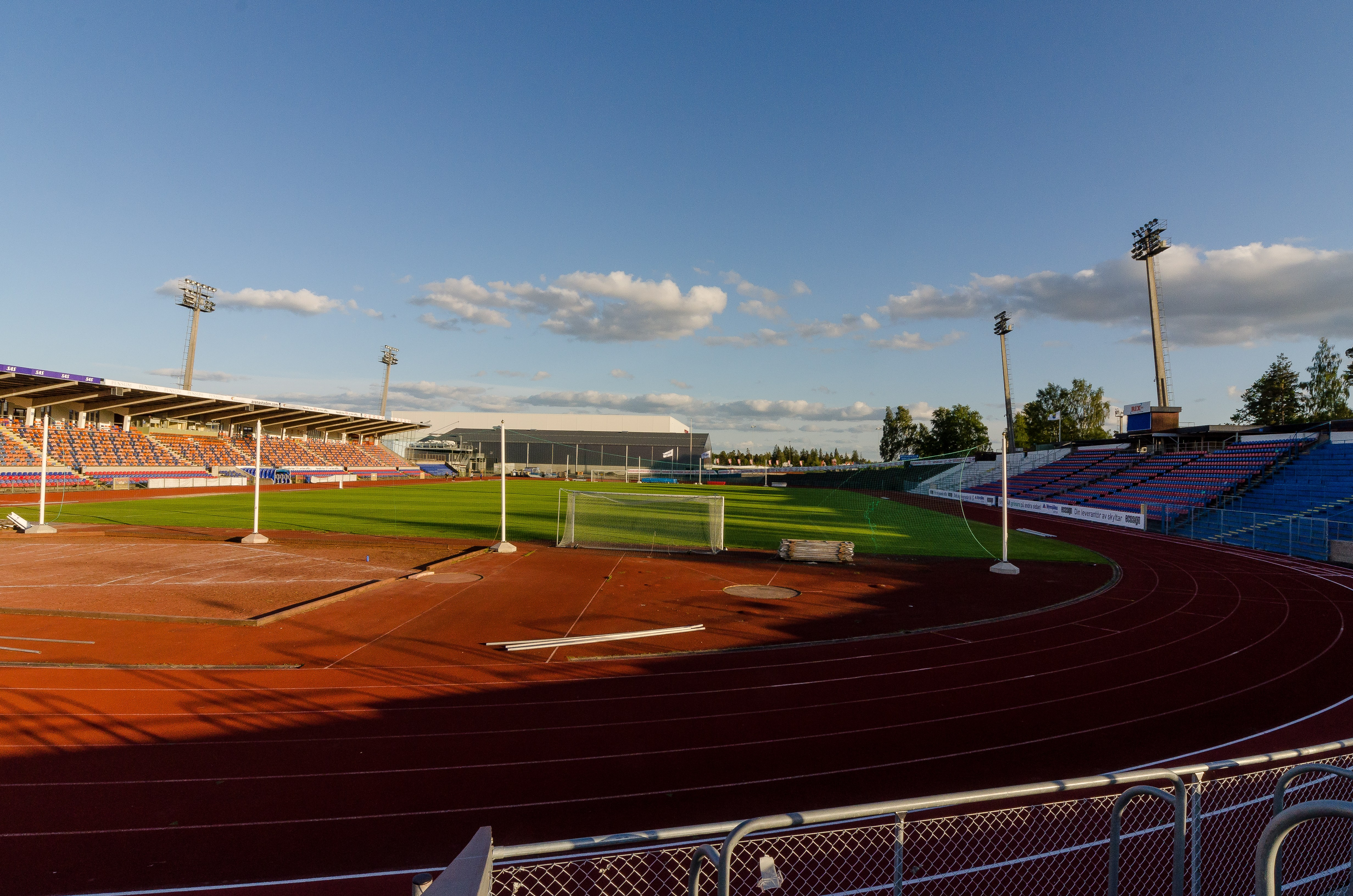
- Värendsvallen
- Interactive map of Värendsvallen
- Location: Växjö, Sweden
- Type: sports ground

Construction
- Opened: 1966

Tenant
- Östers IF (1966–2012)

Värendsvallen is a multi-purpose stadium in Växjö, Sweden. It is currently used mostly for football matches and was the home stadium of Östers IF until September of 2012. The stadium currently holds 15,062 people and was built in 1966. The highest attendance ever was 26,404 against IK Brage in 1967, in the qualifying game for Allsvenskan. The following season, Öster averaged an attendance of 15,622 on their road to the club's first Swedish Championship. On March 31, 2011, work started on Myresjöhus Arena, the stadium was opened in September 2012 and replaced Värendsvallen as Östers IF home ground. Värendsvallen will be transformed into an athletics arena.
