= Magnus Pehrsson =

Swedish footballer and manager (born 1976)

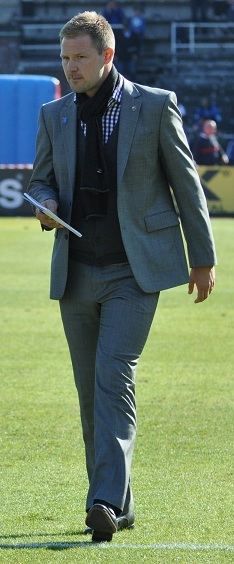
- Pehrsson in 2011

Personal information
- Full name: Karl Magnus Pehrsson
- Date of birth: 25 May 1976 (age 50)
- Place of birth: Malmö, Sweden
- Position: Midfielder

Team information
- Current team: Vélez CF (Director of Football)

Youth career
- 1982–1990: IFK Lidingö

Senior career*
Years	Team	Apps	(Gls)
1991–1993	IF Brommapojkarna	2	(0)
1994–1996	Djurgårdens IF	62	(4)
1996	→ Bradford City (loan)	1	(0)
1997–1998	IFK Göteborg	12	(1)
1999–2003	Djurgårdens IF	72	(9)
Total		149	(14)

International career
1992	Sweden U17	4	(1)
1993–1994	Sweden U19	16	(2)
1995–1997	Sweden U21	5	(0)
1995	Sweden B	1	(0)

Managerial career
- 2004–2005: Åtvidabergs FF
- 2006: IK Sirius
- 2008: GAIS
- 2009–2010: Aalborg BK
- 2011–2013: Djurgårdens IF
- 2013–2016: Estonia
- 2017–2018: Malmö FF
- 2019: Kalmar FF
- * Club domestic league appearances and goals

Karl Magnus Pehrsson (born 25 May 1976) is a Swedish football manager and former professional player who is the Director of Football at Spanish club Vélez CF.

== Club career ==
Pehrsson started his career in IFK Lidingö. He played for Djurgårdens IF and IFK Göteborg in Sweden, as well as Bradford City in England.

For the 1999 season, he rejoined Djurgården. He retired from football as a player due to an injury in 2003.

== International career ==
Pehrsson represented Sweden at the youth and B levels.

== Managerial career ==
Pehrsson started his coaching career as assistant manager in Åtvidabergs FF. He then managed IK Sirius in 2006 and GAIS in 2008.

=== Aalborg BK (2009–2010) ===
In January 2009 he moved from the Swedish leagues to Denmark to coach the Danish Superliga team Aalborg BK.

In his first season AaB managed to finish the Superliga season in 7th with 3 wins and 7 draws from 16 matches under his management. AaB reached the 2008–09 Danish Cup final. In the UEFA Cup AaB were drawn against Deportivo La Coruña. AaB won the first leg at home 3–0 and the away leg 3–1 beating Deportivo 6–1 aggregate. AaB thereby earned a place among the last 16 where they faced Manchester City. After a 2–0 loss in Manchester in the first leg AaB fought back to tie the score with a 2–0 win at home, but were defeated by 4–3 on penalties.

In his first full season AaB finished 5th in the league with 13 wins, 9 draws and 11 losses. In the 2009–10 Danish Cup AaB were surprisingly knocked out in the round of 16 by 2nd Division (third tier) club Hobro IK and in Europa League AaB lost out to Bosnia and Herzegovina club FK Slavija in the second qualifying round.

With 9 points from the first 11 matches in 2010–11 Superliga season he was sacked on 11 October 2010 due to a poor start of the season.

=== Djurgårdens IF (2011–2013) ===
In May 2011 Pehrson was hired by Djurgården to replace Lennart Wass who had been sacked due to a poor start of the 2011 Allsvenskan.

In his first season he managed to bring the team up from 15th to finish 11th and safe from the relegation with a record of 10 wins and 5 draws from 24 matches under his management. In 2011 Svenska Cupen Djurgården were eliminated in the round of 16 by IFK Göteborg.

In 2012 season Djurgården finished 9th in the league with 8 wins, 13 draws and 9 losses. In 2012–13 Svenska Cupen Djurgården finished runners-up, but Pehrsson had already left the club after the quarter-finals.

On 26 April 2013 Pehrsson resigned as manager due to alleged threats against him, though police later dropped the investigation as no legal proof of the threats were found.

=== Estonian national team (2013–2016) ===
On 5 December 2013, Pehrsson was appointed team manager of the Estonian national team. His first match in charge was a win against Gibraltar on 5 March 2014. After a slow start team's form began to pick up and Estonia held high hopes on Euro 2016 qualifying, but a 0–1 loss in a decisive match against Slovenia saw them finishing 4th in group. By mid 2016 the results start to deteriorate: 0–7 loss to Portugal and 0–5 to Bosnia and Herzegovina in 2016 was a blow to a team proud of their defensive record. Pehrsson left the post by mutual consent in September 2016.

=== Malmö FF (2017–2018) ===
On 23 November 2016, Pehrsson was appointed manager of Malmö FF. He led the team to their second consecutive domestic title, winning the 2017 Allsvenskan, but was knocked out of the 2017–18 UEFA Champions League in the second qualifying round.

On 14 May 2018, Pehrsson was sacked as manager of Malmö FF, as the club was placed 10th in Allsvenskan after nine rounds. Niclas Carlnén, managing director at the club, cited that the "results so far are a big disappointment" and stated that the decision was "sad but necessary".

=== Kalmar FF ===
On 27 November 2018, after the end of the 2018 Allsvenskan season, Pehrsson was presented as the new manager of Kalmar FF, a team who ended up at the 10th place in the league. He resigned in October 2019.

=== Vélez CF ===
In April 2022 he became Director of Football at Spanish club Vélez CF.

== Honours ==
=== Player ===
Djurgårdens

- Division 1 Norra: 1994
- Superettan: 2000
- Allsvenskan: 2002

=== Manager ===
Malmö FF

- Allsvenskan: 2017

== Managerial statistics ==
As of 6 September 2016

Team	From	To	Record				
Team	From	To	G	W	D	L	Win %
Estonia	December 2013	September 2016	34	11	9	14	32.35
Total			34	11	9	14	32.35
