= IFK Lidingö Fotboll =

Swedish football club

IFK Lidingö FK
- Full name: Idrottsföreningen Kamraterna Lidingö Fotbollklubb
- Short name: IFK Lidingö FK
- Founded: 1932
- Stadium: Lidingövallen
- Capacity: 2000
- Club director: Markus Karlsson
- Sport director: Magnus Bodsgård
- League: Division 3 Östra Svealand
- 2024: Division 3 Norra Svealand, 7th of 12
Home colours	Away colours

IFK Lidingö FK is a Swedish football club located in Lidingö.

== Background ==
IFK Lidingö is a Swedish sports club that was founded in 1932 and is based on the island of Lidingö outside Stockholm. Although the club takes part in numerous sports, it is most famous for its football, athletics and orienteering sections. The club currently has 400 members, most of them under 15 years of age.

The football section is known as IFK Lidingö FK and currently plays in Division 4 Stockholm Norra which is the sixth tier of Swedish football. They play their home matches at the Lidingövallen in Lidingö.

The club is affiliated to Stockholms Fotbollförbund.

== Season to season ==
In their most successful period IFK Lidingö competed in the following divisions:

Season	Level	Division	Section	Position	Movements
1939–40	Tier 3	Division 3	Östsvenska	4th	
1940–41	Tier 3	Division 3	Östsvenska Södra	1st	Promotion Playoffs – Promoted
1941–42	Tier 2	Division 2	Norra	10th	Relegated
1942–43	Tier 3	Division 3	Östsvenska Södra	1st	Promotion Playoffs
1943–44	Tier 3	Division 3	Östsvenska Södra	7th	
1944–45	Tier 3	Division 3	Östsvenska Södra	3rd	
1945–46	Tier 3	Division 3	Östsvenska Södra	1st	Promotion Playoffs – Promoted
1946–47	Tier 2	Division 2	Östra	9th	Relegated
1947–48	Tier 3	Division 3	Östra	9th	Relegated

In recent seasons IFK Lidingö FK have competed in the following divisions:

Season	Level	Division	Section	Position	Movements
1993	Tier 4	Division 3	Norra Svealand	11th	Relegated
1994	Tier 5	Division 4	Stockholm Norra	1st	Promoted
1995	Tier 4	Division 3	Östra Svealand	5th	
1996	Tier 4	Division 3	Östra Svealand	4th	
1997	Tier 4	Division 3	Östra Svealand	12th	Relegated
1998	Tier 5	Division 4	Stockholm Mellersta	1st	Promoted
1999	Tier 4	Division 3	Östra Svealand	8th	
2000	Tier 4	Division 3	Östra Svealand	6th	
2001	Tier 4	Division 3	Östra Svealand	1st	Promoted
2002	Tier 3	Division 2	Östra Svealand	11th	Relegated
2003	Tier 4	Division 3	Norra Svealand	11th	Relegated
2004	Tier 5	Division 4	Stockholm Mellersta	8th	
2005	Tier 5	Division 4	Stockholm Mellersta	1st	
2006*	Tier 5	Division 3	Norra Svealand	10th	Relegated
2007	Tier 6	Division 4	Stockholm Mellersta	12th	Relegated
2008	Tier 7	Division 5	Stockholm Mellersta	5th	
2009	Tier 7	Division 5	Stockholm Mellersta	7th	
2010	Tier 7	Division 5	Stockholm Mellersta	1st	Promoted
2011	Tier 6	Division 4	Stockholm Norra	4th	
2012	Tier 6	Division 4	Stockholm Norra	3rd	
2013	Tier 6	Division 4	Stockholm Mellersta	7th	
2014	Tier 6	Division 4	Stockholm Mellersta	4th	
2015	Tier 6	Division 4	Stockholm Mellersta	2nd	Promotion Playoffs - Promoted
2016	Tier 5	Division 3	Östra Svealand	1st	Promoted
2017	Tier 4	Division 2	Norra Svealand	6th	
2018	Tier 4	Division 2	Norra Svealand	3rd	
2019	Tier 4	Division 2	Norra Svealand	6th	

* League restructuring in 2006 resulted in a new division being created at Tier 3 and subsequent divisions dropping a level.
