= Stefan Alvén =

Swedish footballer and lawyer

Personal information
- Full name: Stefan Alvén
- Date of birth: 12 December 1968 (age 57)
- Place of birth: Asmundtorp, Sweden
- Position: Defender

Youth career
- Asmundstorps IF

Senior career*
Years	Team	Apps	(Gls)
1985	Asmundstorps IF	14	(0)
1986–1991	Landskrona BoIS	66	(3)
1991–1994	Malmö FF	82	(1)
1995–1999	Djurgårdens IF	120	(2)
2000–2001	IFK Norrköping	35	(1)
Total		317	(7)
- * Club domestic league appearances and goals

Stefan Alvén (born 12 December 1968) is a Swedish lawyer and former footballer who played as a defender.

Alvén was born in Asmundtorp.

== Honours ==
=== Club ===
Djurgårdens IF

- Division 1 Norra (1): 1994
