= Pierre Gallo =

Swedish footballer and coach

Personal information
- Full name: Stig Pierre Antonio Gallo
- Date of birth: 24 January 1975 (age 51)
- Place of birth: Stockholm, Sweden
- Height: 1.82 m (6 ft 0 in)
- Position: Midfielder

Youth career
- Norsborgs IF

Senior career*
Years	Team	Apps	(Gls)
1992–1997	AIK	65	(5)
1998–2000	Djurgårdens IF	68	(16)
2001–2003	Bryne FK	69	(15)
2004	Landskrona BoIS	13	(0)
2005–2006	IFK Norrköping	31	(4)
2007–2010	IK Sirius	75	(6)
2011–2012	IK Frej	41	(3)

International career
1992–1993	Sweden U19	6	(0)
1996–1997	Sweden U21	6	(1)

Managerial career
- 2021–: Hammarby Talang FF (assistant)
- * Club domestic league appearances and goals

Stig Pierre Antonio Gallo (born 24 January 1975) is a Swedish football coach and former footballer. He made 89 Allsvenskan matches for AIK, Djurgårdens IF and Landskrona BoIS. A youth international for Sweden, he represented the Sweden U19 and U21 teams in the mid-1990s.

After his active career he continued as assistant coach in IK Frej.
