= Spårvägens FF =

Swedish football club

- Full name: Spårvägens Fotbollsförening
- Founded: 1919
- Ground: Skarpnäcks Sportfält; Skarpnäck, Stockholm, Sweden
- Chairman: Bengt Gustavsson
- Head Coach: Kjell Ihrestam
- Coach: Tonny Myhrén
- League: Division 4 Stockholm Södra
- 2021: Division 4 Stockholm Södra, 7th
- Website: http://www.sparvagensff.com/
Home colours	Away colours

Spårvägens FF is a Swedish football club located in Skarpnäck in the southern part of Stockholm.

== Background ==
Spårvägens FF is part of Spårvägens GoIF, a sports club that was founded in 1919 by employees of Stockholm's Spårvägar. The club formed a football section in 1969. Initially their first team fluctuated between third and fifth levels in the Swedish football league system but then played several years in Division 1, the second highest Swedish league. Their clubhouse is located in Skarpnäck in southern Stockholm. Spårvägens FF organises one of Stockholm's largest summer cups for youth teams, the Mini Tiger Cup.

The club currently plays in Division 2 Södra Svealand which is the fourth tier of Swedish football. They play their home matches at the newly constructed artificial turf stadium at Skarpnäcks Sportfält in Skarpnäck, Stockholm.

Spårvägens FF have been working hard to regain their Division 2 status and in both 2009 and 2010 they finished in second place in their section and thus reached the promotion playoffs. On each occasion they were unsuccessful losing to Karlstad BK in 2009 and to FC Gute on aggregate in 2010.

Spårvägens FF are affiliated to the Stockholms Fotbollförbund.

== Season to season ==
Season	Level	Division	Section	Position	Movements
1993	Tier 2	Division 1	Norra	4th	
1994	Tier 2	Division 1	Norra	14th	Relegated
1995	Tier 3	Division 2	Östra Svealand	1st	Promoted
1996	Tier 2	Division 1	Norra	3rd	
1997	Tier 2	Division 1	Norra	10th	
1998	Tier 2	Division 1	Norra	10th	
1999	Tier 2	Division 1	Norra	14th	Relegated
2000	Tier 3	Division 2	Östra Svealand	2nd	
2001	Tier 3	Division 2	Västra Svealand	8th	
2002	Tier 3	Division 2	Östra Svealand	4th	
2003	Tier 3	Division 2	Östra Svealand	4th	
2004	Tier 3	Division 2	Norrland	8th	
2005	Tier 3	Division 2	Östra Svealand	10th	
2006*	Tier 4	Division 2	Östra Svealand	10th	Relegation Playoffs
2007	Tier 4	Division 2	Östra Svealand	11th	Relegated
2008	Tier 5	Division 3	Södra Svealand	3rd	
2009	Tier 5	Division 3	Södra Svealand	2nd	Promotion Playoffs
2010	Tier 5	Division 3	Östra Svealand	2nd	Promotion Playoffs – Promoted
2011	Tier 4	Division 2	Norra Svealand	9th	
2012	Tier 4	Division 2	Norra Svealand	6th	
2013	Tier 4	Division 2	Södra Svealand	9th	
2014	Tier 4	Division 2	Norra Svealand	14th	Relegated
2015	Tier 5	Division 3	Södra Svealand	7th	
2016	Tier 5	Division 3	Södra Svealand	7th	
2017	Tier 5	Division 3	Södra Svealand	9th	Relegation Playoffs – Relegated
2018	Tier 6	Division 4	Stockholm Mellersta	4th	
2019	Tier 6	Division 4	Stockholm Mellersta	5th	
2020	Tier 6	Division 4	Stockholm Södra	4th	
2021	Tier 6	Division 4	Stockholm Södra	7th	

* League restructuring in 2006 resulted in a new division being created at Tier 3 and subsequent divisions dropping a level.

== Attendances ==
In recent seasons Spårvägens FF have had the following average attendances:

Season	Average attendance	Division / Section	Level
2006	81	Div 2 Östra Svealand	Tier 4
2007	113	Div 2 Östra Svealand	Tier 4
2008	132	Div 3 Södra Svealand	Tier 5
2009	143	Div 3 Södra Svealand	Tier 5
2010	126	Div 3 Östra Svealand	Tier 5
2011	155	Div 2 Norra Svealand	Tier 4
2012	110	Div 2 Norra Svealand	Tier 4
2013	125	Div 2 Södra Svealand	Tier 4
2014	67	Div 2 Norra Svealand	Tier 4
2015	54	Div 3 Södra Svealand	Tier 5
2016	54	Div 3 Södra Svealand	Tier 5
2017	71	Div 3 Södra Svealand	Tier 5
2018	Not Available	Div 4 Stockholm Mellersta	Tier 6
2019		Div 4 Stockholm Mellersta	Tier 6

== Notable Managers ==
- (Socialist Federal Republic of Yugoslavia) Ranko Đorđić
- (Sweden) Rolf Zetterlund
