= Samuel Wowoah =

Swedish footballer

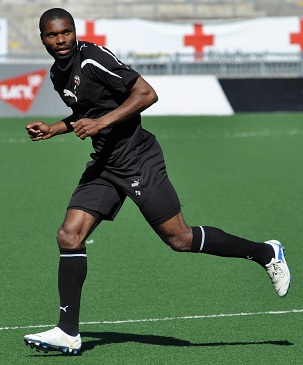

Personal information
- Full name: Samuel Kwicompae Wowoah
- Date of birth: 17 June 1976 (age 50)
- Place of birth: Lindesberg, Sweden
- Height: 1.75 m (5 ft 9 in)
- Positions: Left back; left winger

Youth career
- 1990–1992: IFK Lindesberg
- 1993–1994: Örebro SK

Senior career*
| Years | Team | Apps | (Gls) |
| 1995–1996 | Örebro SK | 5 | (0) |
| 1997 | Hertzöga BK | 25 | (4) |
| 1998 | Motala AIF | 24 | (12) |
| 1999–2000 | Djurgårdens IF | 38 | (15) |
| 2001–2002 | Halmstads BK | 28 | (2) |
| 2002–2004 | Djurgårdens IF | 37 | (7) |
| 2004 | → Stabæk (loan) | 16 | (2) |
| 2005–2006 | IFK Göteborg | 40 | (4) |
| 2007 | Enosis Neon Paralimni | 7 | (1) |
| 2008–2013 | Örebro SK | 166 | (5) |
| 2014–2015 | Karlslund | 28 | (2) |
| Total | | 414 | (54) |

International career
| 1993–1994 | Sweden U19 | 11 | (0) |
- * Club domestic league appearances and goals as of 2 December 2013

Samuel Kwicompae Wowoah (born 17 June 1976) is a Swedish former professional footballer who played as a left back or left winger.

== Club career ==
After playing youth football for IFK Lindesberg, Wowoah joined Örebro SK, he then played two years in lower divisions. In 1999, from Motala AIF, he joined Djurgårdens IF with which he won two Swedish championships. He also played for Halmstads BK two seasons before moving to IFK Göteborg in 2005. He then left the club after the 2006 season. In January 2008 he rejoined Örebro SK.

== International career ==
He played 11 games for the Sweden U19 team between 1993 and 1994. In March 2008, Wowoah was called up to Liberian national team, but never made an appearance for the team.

== Honours ==
Djurgårdens IF

- Allsvenskan: 2002, 2003
