= Lucas Nilsson =

Swedish footballer

Personal information
- Full name: Lucas Nilsson
- Date of birth: 16 July 1973 (age 53)
- Height: 1.74 m (5 ft 8 1/2 in)
- Position: Forward

Youth career
- Björnlunda IF

Senior career*
Years	Team	Apps	(Gls)
1996–2000	Djurgårdens IF	66	(21)
2003–2007	Kalmar FF	51	(12)
- * Club domestic league appearances and goals

Lucas Nilsson (born 16 July 1973) is a Swedish former footballer who played as a forward. He made 25 Allsvenskan appearances for Djurgårdens IF and scored four goals.
