= Fredrik Dahlström =

Swedish footballer

Personal information
- Full name: Fredrik Dahlström
- Date of birth: 1 November 1971 (age 54)
- Position: Forward

Senior career*
Years	Team	Apps	(Gls)
1992–1995	Malmö FF	60	(11)
1996–1999	Djurgårdens IF	93	(39)
2000	Assyriska FF		
- * Club domestic league appearances and goals

Fredrik Dahlström (born 1 November 1971) is a Swedish former footballer who played as a forward.

== Honours ==
=== Club ===
Djurgårdens IF

- Division 1 Norra (1): 1998
