= Patrik Eriksson-Ohlsson =

Swedish footballer (born 1974)

Personal information
- Full name: Patrik Eriksson-Ohlsson
- Date of birth: 9 August 1974 (age 52)
- Height: 1.82 m (5 ft 11 1/2 in)
- Position: Defender

Youth career
- IFK Sundsvall

Senior career*
Years	Team	Apps	(Gls)
1999–2003	Djurgårdens IF	94	(4)
2003–2007	GIF Sundsvall	91	(4)
- * Club domestic league appearances and goals

Patrik "Peo" Eriksson-Ohlsson (born 9 August 1974) is a Swedish former footballer who played as a defender. He made 69 Allsvenskan appearances for Djurgårdens IF and scored three goals, as well as 47 appearances and three goals for GIF Sundsvall

He is the younger brother of Jan Eriksson.

== Honours ==
Djurgårdens IF

- Allsvenskan: 2002, 2003
