= Zoran Stojcevski =

Swedish footballer and manager

Personal information
- Full name: Zoran Stojcevski
- Date of birth: 4 March 1971 (age 55)
- Place of birth: Gothenburg, Sweden
- Height: 1.88 m (6 ft 2 in)
- Position: Midfielder

Senior career*
Years	Team	Apps	(Gls)
1989–1993	IFK Göteborg	7	(0)
1994–1999	Djurgårdens IF	101	(17)
2000–2001	FC Café Opera	43	(5)

International career
1994–	Macedonia	0	(0)

Managerial career
- 2006: Värtans IK
- * Club domestic league appearances and goals

Zoran Stojcevski (born 4 March 1971) is a Swedish former footballer and manager of Macedonian origin. He made 53 Allsvenskan appearances for Djurgårdens IF, and scored 5 goals. He managed Värtans IK in 2006.

In December 1994 he received a call by coach Andon Doncevski to represent Macedonia and was with the team for the UEFA Euro 1996 qualifying match against Cyprus in Skopje. However, he was not selected to take part at the game and remained at the stands.

== Honours ==
=== Club ===
Djurgårdens IF

- Division 1 Norra (2): 1994, 1998
