= 2007 IFK Göteborg season =

IFK Göteborg
2007 season
- Chairman: Stig Lundström
- Head coach: Jonas Olsson & Stefan Rehn
- Stadium: Ullevi
- Allsvenskan: 1st
- Svenska Cupen: Runners-up
- Top goalscorer: League: Marcus Berg (14); All: Marcus Berg (18)
- Highest home attendance: 41,471 vs. Trelleborgs FF (28 October 2007, Allsvenskan)
- Lowest home attendance: 1,521 vs. Gefle IF (5 July 2007, Svenska Cupen); Allsvenskan: 6,128 vs. IF Brommapojkarna (2 September 2007)
- Average home league attendance: 15,798
| Home colours | Away colours |

The 2007 season was IFK Göteborg's 102nd in existence, their 75th season in Allsvenskan and their 31st consecutive season in the league. They competed in Allsvenskan and Svenska Cupen. IFK Göteborg won their first domestic title in 11 years. The club also broke its transfer record when Tobias Hysén was bought from Sunderland for 2.5 million euros.

== Players ==
=== Squad ===
Note: Flags indicate national team as defined under FIFA eligibility rules; some limited exceptions apply. Players may hold more than one non-FIFA nationality.

| No. | Pos. | Nation | Player |
|---|---|---|---|
| 1 | GK | SWE | Bengt Andersson |
| 2 | DF | SWE | Sebastian Eriksson |
| 4 | DF | SWE | Bastian Rojas Diaz |
| 5 | MF | SWE | Mattias Bjärsmyr |
| 6 | DF | SWE | Adam Johansson (vice captain) |
| 7 | MF | SWE | Tobias Hysén |
| 8 | MF | SWE | Thomas Olsson |
| 9 | FW | SWE | Stefan Selaković |
| 10 | MF | SWE | Niclas Alexandersson (captain) |
| 11 | FW | SWE | Mathias Ranégie |
| 12 | GK | SWE | David Stenman |
| 13 | DF | SWE | Gustav Svensson |

| No. | Pos. | Nation | Player |
|---|---|---|---|
| 14 | DF | ISL | Hjálmar Jónsson |
| 15 | MF | SWE | Jakob Johansson |
| 16 | DF | SWE | Magnus Johansson |
| 17 | FW | SWE | George Mourad |
| 18 | FW | SWE | Jonas Wallerstedt |
| 19 | MF | SWE | Pontus Wernbloom |
| 20 | MF | SWE | Eldin Karišik |
| 22 | DF | ISL | Ragnar Sigurðsson |
| 23 | MF | SWE | Andrés Vasquez |
| 25 | GK | SWE | Erik Dahlin |
| 26 | FW | CAN | Ali Gerba |

== Club ==
=== Other information ===
| Chairman | (Sweden) Stig Lundström |
| Club director | (Sweden) Seppo Vaihela |
| Director of sports | (Sweden) Håkan Mild |
| Ground (capacity and dimensions) | Ullevi (43,000 / 105x66 m) |

Source: IFK Göteborg and Gamla Ullevi

== Competitions ==
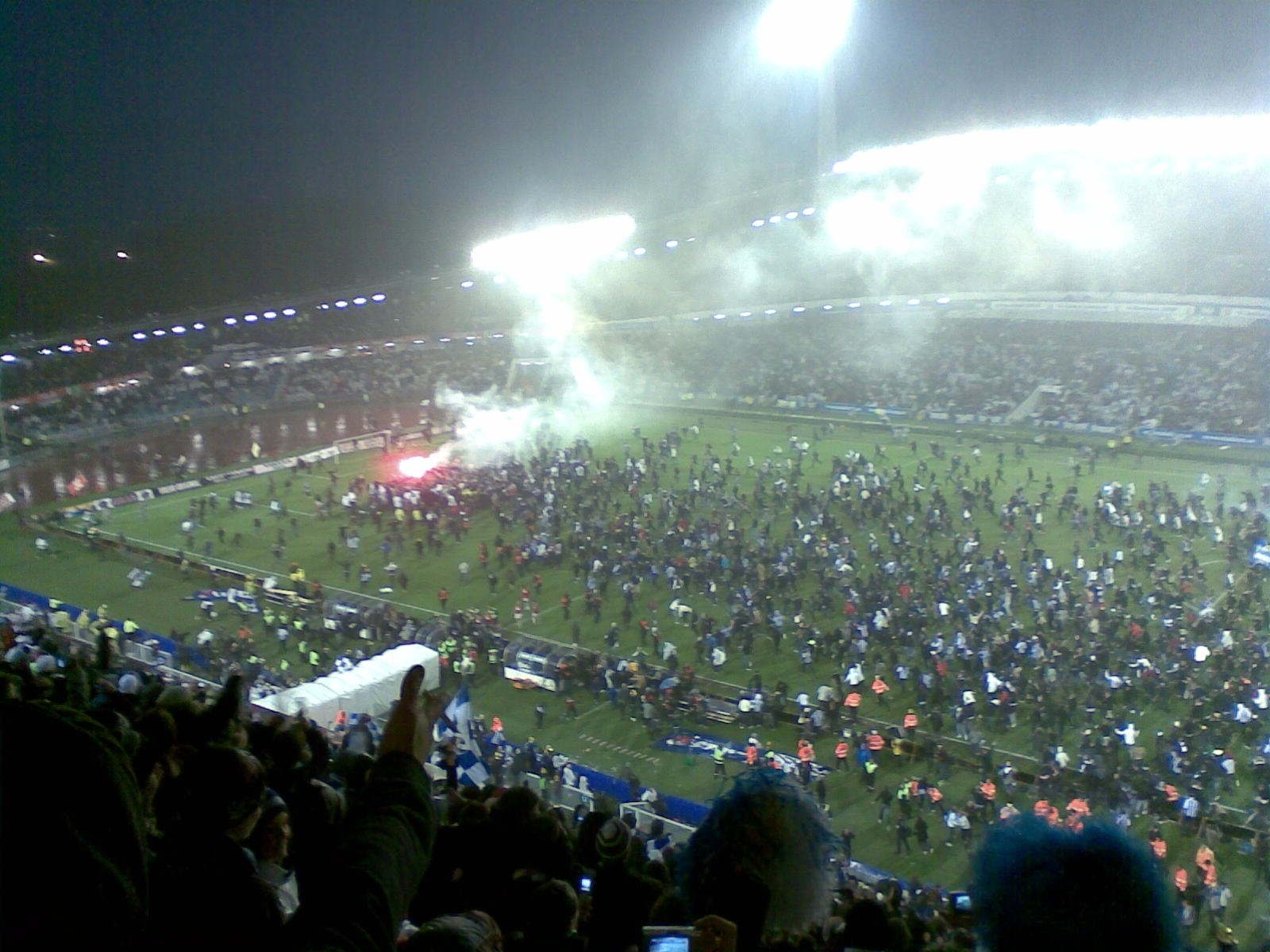
Celebration at Ullevi after winning the title.

=== Overall ===
| Competition | Started round | Final position / round | First match | Last match |
|---|---|---|---|---|
| Allsvenskan | Matchday 1 | Winners | 6 April 2007 | 28 October 2007 |
| Svenska Cupen | Round 2 | Runners-up | 26 April 2007 | 27 September 2007 |

Source: Competitions

=== Allsvenskan ===
==== League table ====
| Pos | Team | Pld | W | D | L | GF | GA | GD | Pts | Qualification or relegation |
|---|---|---|---|---|---|---|---|---|---|---|
| 1 | IFK Göteborg (C) | 26 | 14 | 7 | 5 | 45 | 23 | +22 | 49 | Qualification to Champions League first qualifying round |
| 2 | Kalmar FF | 26 | 15 | 3 | 8 | 43 | 32 | +11 | 48 | Qualification to UEFA Cup first qualifying round |
| 3 | Djurgårdens IF | 26 | 13 | 7 | 6 | 39 | 24 | +15 | 46 | Qualification to UEFA Cup first qualifying round |
| 4 | IF Elfsborg | 26 | 10 | 10 | 6 | 39 | 30 | +9 | 40 | Qualification to Intertoto Cup first round |
| 5 | AIK | 26 | 10 | 8 | 8 | 30 | 27 | +3 | 38 | |

Source: svenskfotboll.se (in Swedish)
Rules for classification: 1) points; 2) goal difference; 3) number of goals scored.
(C) Champions

==== Results summary ====
| Overall | | | | | | | | Home | | | | | | Away | | | | | |
| Pld | W | D | L | GF | GA | GD | Pts | W | D | L | GF | GA | GD | W | D | L | GF | GA | GD |
|---|---|---|---|---|---|---|---|---|---|---|---|---|---|---|---|---|---|---|---|
| 26 | 14 | 7 | 5 | 45 | 23 | +22 | 49 | 6 | 5 | 2 | 19 | 10 | +9 | 8 | 2 | 3 | 26 | 13 | +13 |

Source: svenskfotboll.se (in Swedish)

==== Results by round ====
| Round | 1 | 2 | 3 | 4 | 5 | 6 | 7 | 8 | 9 | 10 | 11 | 12 | 13 | 14 | 15 | 16 | 17 | 18 | 19 | 20 | 21 | 22 | 23 | 24 | 25 | 26 |
|---|---|---|---|---|---|---|---|---|---|---|---|---|---|---|---|---|---|---|---|---|---|---|---|---|---|---|
| Ground | A | H | A | H | A | H | A | H | A | H | A | H | H | A | H | A | A | H | A | H | H | A | H | A | A | H |
| Result | D | L | W | D | W | W | L | W | L | W | L | L | D | D | W | W | W | D | W | D | D | W | W | W | W | W |
| Position | 5 | 11 | 5 | 9 | 2 | 2 | 4 | 1 | 5 | 2 | 6 | 8 | 8 | 7 | 6 | 5 | 4 | 4 | 2 | 4 | 4 | 1 | 1 | 1 | 1 | 1 |

Source: see below
A = Away; H = Home; W = Win; D = Draw; L = Loss

==== Matches ====
Kickoff times are in UTC+2 unless stated otherwise.

| 6 April 2007 Round 1 | Trelleborgs FF | 1–1 | IFK Göteborg | Trelleborg |
| 15:00 | Malmqvist 41' | Report | Wernbloom 5' | Stadium: Vångavallen; Attendance: 5,480; Referee: Markus Strömbergsson |

| 17 April 2007 Round 2 | IFK Göteborg | 1–2 | AIK | Gothenburg |
| 19:00 | J. Berg 16' | Report | Burgić 54'; Figueiredo 87' | Stadium: Ullevi; Attendance: 18,162; Referee: Martin Hansson |

| 23 April 2007 Round 3 | IF Brommapojkarna | 1–2 | IFK Göteborg | Stockholm |
| 19:00 | Guterstam 80' | Report | M. Berg 8'; Alexandersson 49' | Stadium: Stockholms Stadion; Attendance: 2,621; Referee: Daniel Stålhammar |

| 30 April 2007 Round 4 | IFK Göteborg | 1–1 | Halmstads BK | Gothenburg |
| 17:00 | Wernbloom 44' | Report | Tahirović 3' | Stadium: Ullevi; Attendance: 8,320; Referee: Martin Ingvarsson |

| 7 May 2007 Round 5 | Örebro SK | 0–4 | IFK Göteborg | Örebro |
| 19:00 | | Report | M. Berg 33'; Karišik 46'; Olsson 63'; Vasquez 69' | Stadium: Eyravallen; Attendance: 9,555; Referee: Stefan Johannesson |

| 14 May 2007 Round 6 | IFK Göteborg | 2–0 | Gefle IF | Gothenburg |
| 19:00 | M. Berg 61', 65' | Report | | Stadium: Ullevi; Attendance: 7,310; Referee: Sven-Martin Åkesson |

| 22 May 2007 Round 7 | IF Elfsborg | 3–1 | IFK Göteborg | Borås |
| 19:00 | Svensson 38', 62', 79' | Report | M. Berg 26' | Stadium: Borås Arena; Attendance: 16,599; Referee: Martin Ingvarsson |

| 28 May 2007 Round 8 | IFK Göteborg | 1–0 | GAIS | Gothenburg |
| 19:00 | M. Berg 76' | Report | | Stadium: Ullevi; Attendance: 30,406; Referee: Stefan Johannesson |

| 12 June 2007 Round 9 | Djurgårdens IF | 2–1 | IFK Göteborg | Stockholm |
| 19:00 | Tauer 35'; Komac 45' | Report | M. Berg 2' | Stadium: Stockholms Stadion; Attendance: 12,697; Referee: Martin Hansson |

| 17 June 2007 Round 10 | IFK Göteborg | 3–2 | Kalmar FF | Gothenburg |
| 17:00 | Wallerstedt 33', 90'; Vasquez 44' | Report | Ari 32'; Johansson 83' | Stadium: Ullevi; Attendance: 6,754; Referee: Martin Ingvarsson |

| 27 June 2007 Round 11 | Hammarby IF | 3–1 | IFK Göteborg | Stockholm |
| 19:00 | Eguren 9'; Chanko 22'; Zengin 44' | Report | M. Johansson 50' | Stadium: Söderstadion; Attendance: 12,512; Referee: Martin Ingvarsson |

| 2 July 2007 Round 12 | IFK Göteborg | 1–2 | Malmö FF | Gothenburg |
| 19:00 | M. Berg 70' (pen.) | Report | Skoog 22'; Júnior 90' | Stadium: Ullevi; Attendance: 11,270; Referee: Stefan Johannesson |

| 10 July 2007 Round 13 | IFK Göteborg | 0–0 | Helsingborgs IF | Gothenburg |
| 19:00 | | Report | | Stadium: Ullevi; Attendance: 10,768; Referee: Markus Strömbergsson |

| 15 July 2007 Round 14 | Helsingborgs IF | 2–2 | IFK Göteborg | Helsingborg |
| 17:00 | Omotoyossi 53', 79' | Report | Berg 29', 42' (pen.) | Stadium: Olympia; Attendance: 14,090; Referee: Sven-Martin Åkesson |

| 31 July 2007 Round 15 | IFK Göteborg | 2–0 | Örebro SK | Gothenburg |
| 19:00 | Selaković 15'; Berg 77' | Report | | Stadium: Ullevi; Attendance: 7,712; Referee: Martin Hansson |

| 6 August 2007 Round 16 | Gefle IF | 0–2 | IFK Göteborg | Gävle |
| 19:00 | | Report | Berg 24', 90' | Stadium: Strömvallen; Attendance: 6,683; Referee: Daniel Stålhammar |

| 11 August 2007 Round 17 | Kalmar FF | 0–5 | IFK Göteborg | Kalmar |
| 16:00 | | Report | Selaković 36'; Wernbloom 45'; Berg 83'; Wallerstedt 89'; Bjärsmyr 90' | Stadium: Fredriksskans; Attendance: 5,670; Referee: Markus Strömbergsson |

| 16 August 2007 Round 18 | IFK Göteborg | 1–1 | Djurgårdens IF | Gothenburg |
| 20:00 | Wallerstedt 79' | Report | Jonson 70' | Stadium: Ullevi; Attendance: 12,187; Referee: Peter Fröjdfeldt |

| 28 August 2007 Round 19 | Halmstads BK | 1–3 | IFK Göteborg | Halmstad |
| 20:00 | Arvidsson 85' | Report | Wernbloom 5'; Wallerstedt 57'; Jónsson 66' | Stadium: Örjans Vall; Attendance: 9,104; Referee: Martin Hansson |

| 2 September 2007 Round 20 | IFK Göteborg | 0–0 | IF Brommapojkarna | Gothenburg |
| 17:00 | | Report | | Stadium: Ullevi; Attendance: 6,128; Referee: Martin Hansson |

| 15 September 2007 Round 21 | IFK Göteborg | 2–2 | IF Elfsborg | Gothenburg |
| 16:00 | Svensson 3'; Wallerstedt 23' | Report | Ishizaki 37', 66' | Stadium: Ullevi; Attendance: 30,339; Referee: Jonas Eriksson |

| 25 September 2007 Round 22 | GAIS | 0–1 | IFK Göteborg | Gothenburg |
| 19:00 | | Report | Wernbloom 2' | Stadium: Ullevi; Attendance: 30,956; Referee: Stefan Johannesson |

| 1 October 2007 Round 23 | IFK Göteborg | 3–0 | Hammarby IF | Gothenburg |
| 19:00 | Alexandersson 4'; Lidholm 22' (o.g.); Wallerstedt 57' | Report | | Stadium: Ullevi; Attendance: 14,543; Referee: Martin Ingvarsson |

| 6 October 2007 Round 24 | Malmö FF | 0–2 | IFK Göteborg | Malmö |
| 16:00 | | Report | Selaković 33'; Hysén 72' | Stadium: Malmö Stadion; Attendance: 11,219; Referee: Jonas Eriksson |

| 22 October 2007 Round 25 | AIK | 0–1 | IFK Göteborg | Solna |
| 19:00 | | Report | Bjärsmyr 19' | Stadium: Råsunda Stadium; Attendance: 18,407; Referee: Martin Ingvarsson |

| 28 October 2007 Round 26 | IFK Göteborg | 2–0 | Trelleborgs FF | Gothenburg |
| 15:00 UTC+1 | Olsson 7'; Wernbloom 34' | Report | | Stadium: Ullevi; Attendance: 41,471; Referee: Martin Hansson |

=== Svenska Cupen ===
Kickoff times are in UTC+2.

| 26 April 2007 Round 2 | Ängelholms FF | 2–2 (a.e.t.) (1–4 p) | IFK Göteborg | Ängelholm |
| 18:00 | 68'; C. Augustsson 119' | | M. Berg 23', 110' | Stadium: Ängelholms IP; Attendance: 1,640; Referee: Håkan Jonasson |
| | Penalties |
| | J. Augustsson (penalty missed); Rojas (penalty missed) (penalty scored) | | (penalty scored) M. Johansson; (penalty scored) Olsson; (penalty scored) Alexandersson; (penalty scored) M. Berg |

| 17 May 2007 Round 3 | Ljungby IF | 1–6 | IFK Göteborg | Ljungby |
| 17:00 | Nilsson (?) | | M. Johansson (?); J. Berg (?); Selaković (?); Wallerstedt (?) | Stadium: Lagavallen; Attendance: 2,080; Referee: Martin Ingdotter Olsson |

| 5 July 2007 Round 4 | IFK Göteborg | 3–0 | Gefle IF | Gothenburg |
| 19:00 | Wernbloom 51'; M. Berg 72', 78' (pen.) | | | Stadium: Ullevi; Attendance: 1,521; Referee: Håkan Jonasson |

| 2 August 2007 Quarter-finals | Mjällby AIF | 1–2 (a.e.t.) | IFK Göteborg | Hällevik |
| 18:30 | Fejzullahu 10' | | Mourad 90'; Jónsson 111' | Stadium: Strandvallen; Attendance: 5,482; Referee: Michael Lerjéus |

| 22 September 2007 Semi-finals | IFK Göteborg | 4–0 | Landskrona BoIS | Gothenburg |
| 16:00 | Wernbloom 31', 55', 74'; Bjärsmyr 62' | | | Stadium: Ullevi; Attendance: 2,222; Referee: Peter Fröjdfeldt |

| 27 September 2007 Final | Kalmar FF | 3–0 | IFK Göteborg | Kalmar |
| 19:00 | Santin 22', 88' (pen.); Ingelsten 65' | | | Stadium: Fredriksskans; Attendance: 6,877; Referee: Martin Ingvarsson |

== Non competitive ==
=== Pre-season ===
Kickoff times are in UTC+1 unless stated otherwise.

| 3 February 2007 Friendly | IFK Göteborg | 1–2 | BK Häcken | Gothenburg, Sweden |
| 13:30 | Selaković 26' | | Henriksson 48' (pen.); Skúlason 90' | Stadium: Valhalla IP |

| 10 February 2007 Friendly | IF Elfsborg | 1–0 | IFK Göteborg | Borås, Sweden |
| 13:00 | Keene 14' | | | Stadium: Borås Arena; Attendance: 2,112; Referee: Åke Andreasson |

| 15 February 2007 Friendly | IFK Göteborg (Sweden) | 0–0 | (Russia) Sibir Novosibirsk | Marbella, Spain |
| 16:00 | | | | Stadium: Marpafut |

| 19 February 2007 Friendly | IFK Göteborg (Sweden) | 1–0 | (Poland) Korona Kielce | Marbella, Spain |
| 16:00 | M. Berg 22' | | | Stadium: Marpafut; Attendance: 25 |

| 6 March 2007 Friendly | AaB (Denmark) | 2–1 | (Sweden) IFK Göteborg | Aalborg, Denmark |
| | Prica 66'; Lindström 86' | | Selaković 60' | Stadium: Hornevej; Attendance: 50 |

| 14 March 2007 Friendly | IFK Göteborg | 1–0 | Örgryte IS | Gothenburg, Sweden |
| 16:30 | J. Berg 44' | | | Stadium: Ruddalens IP; Attendance: 1,500 |

| 21 March 2007 Friendly | IFK Göteborg (Sweden) | 5–0 | (Cyprus) ASIL Lysi | Larnaca, Cyprus |
| 15:30 UTC+2 | Selaković 7'; Wallerstedt 43', 61', 88'; Sigurðsson 59' |

| 24 March 2007 Friendly | IFK Göteborg (Sweden) | 4–0 | (Norway) Aalesunds FK | Larnaca, Cyprus |
| | Wernbloom 30'; Selaković 31', 52'; J. Berg 73' (pen.) | Report |

| 29 March 2007 Friendly | IFK Göteborg (Sweden) | 3–0 | (Norway) Bryne FK | Gothenburg, Sweden |
| 17:30 | Wernbloom 18'; Wallerstedt 22'; Bastian Andersson 41' | | | Stadium: Backavallen; Attendance: 1,000 |

=== Mid-season ===
Kickoff times are in UTC+2.

| 5 June 2007 Friendly | Sävedalens IF | 0–3 | IFK Göteborg | Partille, Sweden |
| | | | J. Berg (?); Olsson (?) | Stadium: Vallhamra IP |

| 24 July 2007 Friendly | IFK Göteborg (Sweden) | 1–2 | (England) Crystal Palace | Grebbestad, Sweden |
| 19:30 | Mourad 74' | | Ifill 2'; Scowcroft 35' | Stadium: Siljevi IP; Attendance: 1,311 |
