= 2008 IFK Göteborg season =

IFK Göteborg
2008 season
- Manager: Jonas Olsson & Stefan Rehn
- Allsvenskan: 3rd
- Champions League: 2nd Qualifying round
- Svenska Cupen: Champions
- Top goalscorer: Jonas Wallerstedt (8)

IFK Göteborg finished inside the top three, but was nowhere near defending their title from 2007. As a consolation, IFK was able to win the cup final against Kalmar FF on penalties. The Champions League qualification ended with a 4–2 defeat away from home at FC Basel.

== Players ==
=== Squad ===
As of 21 September 2008: Note: Flags indicate national team as defined under FIFA eligibility rules; some limited exceptions apply. Players may hold more than one non-FIFA nationality.

No.	Pos.	Nation	Player
1	GK	DEN	Kim Christensen
2	DF	SWE	Sebastian Eriksson
3	DF	SWE	Nicklas Carlsson
5	DF	SWE	Mattias Bjärsmyr
6	DF	SWE	Adam Johansson
7	MF	SWE	Tobias Hysén
8	MF	SWE	Thomas Olsson
9	FW	SWE	Stefan Selakovic
10	MF	SWE	Niclas Alexandersson
12	GK	SWE	David Stenman
13	MF	SWE	Gustav Svensson
14	DF	ISL	Hjálmar Jónsson

No.	Pos.	Nation	Player
15	MF	SWE	Jakob Johansson
16	DF	SWE	Erik Lund
17	FW	SWE	Daniel Alexandersson
18	FW	SWE	Jonas Wallerstedt
19	MF	SWE	Pontus Wernbloom
22	DF	ISL	Ragnar Sigurðsson
23	DF	SWE	Oskar Gustafsson
24	MF	SWE	Jonatan Berg
25	GK	SWE	Erik Dahlin (on loan to Västra Frölunda IF)
28	MF	SWE	Niklas Bärkroth
29	FW	SWE	Robin Söder

=== Squad stats ===
				Total			Allsvenskan		Svenska Cupen		Champions League		Supercupen	
No.	Pos.	Nat.	Name	Sts	App	Gls	App	Gls	App	Gls	App	Gls	App	Gls
1	GK	(Denmark)	Christensen	40	40		30		5		4		1	
6	RB	(Sweden)	A. Johansson	26	27	1	19		4		4	1		
5	CB	(Sweden)	Bjärsmyr	37	38	1	27	1	6		4		1	
22	CB	(Iceland)	Sigurdsson	39	39	4	29	4	6		3		1	
14	LB	(Iceland)	Jónsson	36	36	2	25		6		4	1	1	1
10	RM	(Sweden)	Alexandersson	28	29	7	23	6	2		3	1	1	
8	CM	(Sweden)	Olsson	25	28	5	20	3	4	1	4	1		
13	CM	(Sweden)	Svensson	27	34	3	27	3	3		3		1	
7	LM	(Sweden)	Hysén	33	41	6	30	4	6	2	4		1	
18	CF	(Sweden)	Wallerstedt	22	34	10	28	7	3		2	1	1	2
19	CF	(Sweden)	Wernbloom	30	33	13	26	8	3	3	3	2	1	
9	MF	(Sweden)	Selakovic	15	34	4	25	2	5	1	3	1	1	
2	DF	(Sweden)	Eriksson	20	26	2	17	1	5	1	4			
29	FW	(Sweden)	Söder	17	23	7	14	5	5		4	2		
15	MF	(Sweden)	J. Johansson	11	19	4	15	2	4	2				
17	MF	(Sweden)	D. Alexandersson	8	18		12		3		2		1	
15	DF	(Sweden)	Lund	13	14		11		2		1			
11	FW	(Sweden)	Ranégie	2	12	3	9	1	2	2			1	
20	MF	(Sweden)	Karisik	9	12		7		3		1		1	
24	MF	(Sweden)	Berg	8	10	1	9	1					1	
28	FW	(Sweden)	Bärkroth	1	5	2	2		1		2	2		
3	DF	(Sweden)	Carlsson	2	2		2							
20	DF	(Sweden)	Etéus		1		1							

Last updated: 18 November
Source: IFK Göteborg
Ordered by Starting 11 then appearances
0 shown as blank

== Club ==
=== Coaching staff ===
Position	Staff
Manager	(Sweden) Stefan Rehn (Sweden) Jonas Olsson
Assistant manager	(Sweden) Teddy Olausson
Goalkeeping coach	(Sweden) Ove Tobiasson
Fitness coach	(Sweden) Jonas Hellberg

Last updated: 9 November
Source: IFK Göteborg

=== Kit ===
Supplier: Adidas
Sponsor(s): ICA, KIA Motors

Home; Domestic	Away; Domestic

=== Other information ===
Chairman	(Sweden) Stig Lundström
Sport director	(Sweden) Håkan Mild
Ground (capacity and dimensions)	Ullevi (43,200 / 100x68 m)

Updated to match played 9 November
Source: IFK Göteborg and Ullevi

== Competitions ==
=== Overall ===
Competition	Started round	Current position / round	Final position / round	First match	Last match
Allsvenskan	—	—	3rd	31 March	9 November
Svenska Cupen	Second round	—	Final	1 May	21 September
Champions League	First qualifying round	—	Second qualifying round	15 July	6 August

Updated to match played November 11
Source: Competitions

=== Allsvenskan ===
==== Results summary ====
Overall								Home						Away					
Pld	W	D	L	GF	GA	GD	Pts	W	D	L	GF	GA	GD	W	D	L	GF	GA	GD
30	15	9	6	50	26	+24	54	11	2	2	33	10	+23	4	7	4	17	16	+1

Last updated: November 11.
Source: svenskfotboll

==== Results by round ====
Round	1	2	3	4	5	6	7	8	9	10	11	12	13	14	15	16	17	18	19	20	21	22	23	24	25	26	27	28	29	30
Ground	A	H	A	H	A	H	A	H	A	H	A	H	H	A	H	A	H	A	A	H	A	H	H	A	H	A	H	A	H	A
Result	D	W	D	W	D	W	L	W	D	W	L	L	D	W	W	W	W	L	D	L	D	W	D	W	W	W	W	D	W	L

Updated to match(es) played on November 11. Source: Competitive Matches
A = Away; H = Home; W = Win; D = Draw; L = Loss

=== Competitive ===
Game	Date	Tournament	Round	Ground	Opponent	Score^{1}	TV	Report
1	22 March	Supercupen		H	Kalmar FF	3–1	TV4	Kick off / 16:00 CET; Attendance / 1,643; Referee / Martin Hansson; IFK Göteborg / Kalmar FF; 24', 82' Wallerstedt; 67' Jónsson / 87' Santin
2	31 March	Allsvenskan	1	A	Malmö FF	1–1	TV4 Sport	Kick off / 19:45 CEST; Attendance / 18,884; Referee / Peter Fröjdfeldt; IFK Göteborg / Malmö FF; 57' Wallerstedt / 62' Gabriel
3	6 April	Allsvenskan	2	H	Örebro SK	4–1	PPV	Kick off / 15:00 CEST; Attendance / 10,482; Referee / Daniel Stålhammar; IFK Göteborg / Örebro SK; 5' Sigurdsson; 43', 62' Alexandersson; 48' Wernbloom / 85' Kihlberg
4	9 April	Allsvenskan	3	A	Halmstads BK	1–1	TV4 Sport	Kick off / 19:45 CEST; Attendance / 6,786; Referee / Stefan Johannesson; IFK Göteborg / Halmstads BK; 42' Olsson / 25' Larsson
5	12 April	Allsvenskan	4	H	IFK Norrköping	4–0	TV4	Kick off / 16:00 CEST; Attendance / 7,212; Referee / Martin Ingvarsson; IFK Göteborg / IFK Norrköping; 42' (og.) Magnusson; 53' Hysén; 72' Svensson; 77' Ranégie
6	17 April	Allsvenskan	5	A	GAIS	0–0	Canal+	Kick off / 20:00 CEST; Attendance / 27,238; Referee / Jonas Eriksson
7	21 April	Allsvenskan	6	H	AIK	2–0	PPV	Kick off / 19:00 CEST; Attendance / 9,679; Referee / Martin Hansson; IFK Göteborg / AIK; 9' Berg; 14' Wallerstedt
8	25 April	Allsvenskan	7	A	Ljungskile SK	1–2	PPV	Kick off / 19:00 CEST; Attendance / 7,128; Referee / Martin Ingvarsson; IFK Göteborg / Ljungskile SK; 21' Wernbloom / 6', 58' Kristoffersson
9	28 April	Allsvenskan	8	H	GIF Sundsvall	1–0	PPV	Kick off / 19:00 CEST; Attendance / 6,332; Referee / Markus Strömbergsson; IFK Göteborg / GIF Sundsvall; 59' Sigurdsson
10	1 May	Svenska Cupen	Second round	A	Skövde AIK	2–1	–	Kick off / 19:00 CEST; Attendance / 2,673; Referee / Johnny Lundbäck; IFK Göteborg / Skövde AIK; 37' Ranégie; 59' Eriksson / 50' Muweke
11	4 May	Allsvenskan	9	A	Hammarby IF	0–0	TV4 Sport	Kick off / 17:45 CEST; Attendance / 12,198; Referee / Peter Fröjdfeldt
12	7 May	Allsvenskan	10	H	Kalmar FF	3–2	PPV	Kick off / 19:00 CEST; Attendance / 12,473; Referee / Stefan Johannesson; IFK Göteborg / Kalmar FF; 52', 55' Wallerstedt; 60' Svensson / 6' Ingelsten; 38' Santin
13	12 May	Allsvenskan	11	A	IF Elfsborg	0–3	Canal+	Kick off / 20:00 CEST; Attendance / 16,599; Referee / Martin Hansson; IFK Göteborg / IF Elfsborg; / 68', 75' Berglund; 90' Ishizaki
14	17 May	Svenska Cupen	Third round	A	Falkenbergs FF	3–0	–	Kick off / 16:00 CEST; Attendance / 2,445; Referee / Håkan Jonasson; IFK Göteborg / Falkenbergs FF; 113' Ranégie; 115' Hysén; 118' Olsson
15	28 June	Svenska Cupen	Fourth round		Ljungskile SK	1–0	–	Kick off / 16:00 CEST; Attendance / 1,998; Referee / Johnny Lundbäck; IFK Göteborg / Ljungskile SK; 58' J. Johansson
16	1 July	Allsvenskan	12	H	Trelleborgs FF	0–2	PPV	Kick off / 19:00 CEST; Attendance / 7,226; Referee / Sven-Martin Åkesson; IFK Göteborg / Trelleborgs FF; / 29' Paulino; 75' Jensen
17	7 July	Allsvenskan	13	H	Helsingborgs IF	1–1	Canal+	Kick off / 20:00 CEST; Attendance / 8,246; Referee / Martin Hansson; IFK Göteborg / Helsingborgs IF; 25' Wallerstedt / 73' C. Andersson
18	10 July	Svenska Cupen	Quarter-finals	A	GIF Sundsvall	3–2	–	Kick off / 19:00 CEST; Attendance / 3,457; Referee / Michael Lerjéus; IFK Göteborg / GIF Sundsvall; 50' J. Johansson; 67' Hysén; 76' Wernbloom / 30' Saglik; 62' Sigurdsson
19	12 July	Allsvenskan	14		Djurgårdens IF	2–1	TV4	Kick off / 16:00 CEST; Attendance / 10,713; Referee / Martin Ingvarsson; IFK Göteborg / Djurgårdens IF; 38' Alexandersson; 90' Söder / 37' Tauer
20	15 July	Champions League	First qualifying round	A (San Marino)	Murata (San Marino)	5–0	–	Kick off / 20:30 CEST
21	19 July	Allsvenskan	15	H	Gefle IF	3–0	PPV	Kick off / 20:00 CEST; Attendance / 5,101; Referee / Åke Andreasson; IFK Göteborg / Gefle IF; 18' Söder; 33' Eriksson; 87' Wallerstedt
22	23 July	Champions League	First qualifying round	H	Murata (San Marino)	4–0	–	Kick off / 20:00 CEST
23	26 July	Allsvenskan	16	A	Gefle IF	1–0	TV4	Kick off / 16:00 CEST; Attendance / 3,930; Referee / Tobias Mattsson; IFK Göteborg / Gefle IF; 8' Söder
24	30 July	Champions League	Second qualifying round	H	Basel (Switzerland)	1–1	TV6	Kick off / 20:15 CEST
25	2 August	Allsvenskan	17	H	Malmö FF	2–0	TV4	Kick off / 16:00 CEST; Attendance / 8,015; Referee / Martin Hansson; IFK Göteborg / Malmö FF; 1' Söder; 45' Wallerstedt
26	6 August	Champions League	Second qualifying round	A (Switzerland)	Basel (Switzerland)	2–4	TV6	Kick off / 20:15 CEST
27	9 August	Allsvenskan	18	A	Örebro SK	2–4	TV4	Kick off / 16:00 CEST; Attendance / 7,873; Referee / Åke Andreasson; IFK Göteborg / Örebro SK; 18' (og.) O. Johansson; 44' Selakovic / 1' (og.) Jónsson; 30', 69' Olsen; 73' Staaf
28	23 August	Allsvenskan	20	A	IFK Norrköping	2–2	TV4	Kick off / 16:00 CEST; Attendance / 4,938; Referee / Daniel Stålhammar; IFK Göteborg / IFK Norrköping; 1', 13' Wernbloom / 32' Mrdjanin
29	28 August	Svenska Cupen	Semi-finals	A	Enköpings SK	3–0	–	Kick off / 19:00 CEST; Attendance / 1,829; Referee / Tobias Mattsson; IFK Göteborg / Enköpings SK; 39', 90' Wernbloom; 89' Selakovic
30	1 September	Allsvenskan	21	H	GAIS	0–1	Canal+	Kick off / 20:00 CEST
31	13 September	Allsvenskan	22	A	AIK	0–0	TV4	Kick off / 12:30 CEST
32	17 September	Allsvenskan	19	H	Halmstads BK	3–0	PPV	Kick off / 19:00 CEST
33	21 September	Svenska Cupen	Final	A	Kalmar FF	0–0 (5-4 pen.)	TV4	Kick off / 15:00 CEST; Attendance / 7,158; Referee / Peter Fröjdfeldt
34	24 September	Allsvenskan	23	H	Ljungskile SK	0–0	PPV	Kick off / 19:00 CEST
35	29 September	Allsvenskan	24	A	GIF Sundsvall	5–0	PPV	Kick off / 19:00 CEST
36	6 October	Allsvenskan	25	H	Hammarby IF	2–0	Canal+	Kick off / 20:00 CEST
37	18 October	Allsvenskan	26	A	Kalmar FF	1–0	TV4	Kick off / 16:00 CEST
38	26 October	Allsvenskan	27	H	IF Elfsborg	5–2	Canal+	Kick off / 17:00 CET
39	29 October	Allsvenskan	28	A	Trelleborgs FF	0–0	PPV	Kick off / 19:00 CET
40	3 November	Allsvenskan	29	H	Djurgårdens IF	3–1	PPV	Kick off / 19:00 CET; Attendance / 8,070; Referee / Åke Andreasson; IFK Göteborg / Djurgårdens IF; 10' Wernbloom; 22' Alexandersson; 56' Hysén / 51' Kusi-Asare
41	9 November	Allsvenskan	30	A	Helsingborgs IF	1–2	PPV	Kick off / 15:00 CET; Attendance / 8,592; Referee / Martin Hansson; IFK Göteborg / Helsingborgs IF; 27' Alexandersson / 13' Jönsson; 54' Larsson

Last updated: November 11
^{1}IFK Göteborg goals come first.
National flags for Ground and Opponent columns are only shown when different from that of IFK Göteborg.
M = Match; Ground: H = Home, A = Away, N = Neutral, HR = Home replacement, AR = Away replacement.

=== Friendlies ===
Match	Date	Competition or tour	Ground	Opponent	Score^{1}	Scorers	GD
1	30 January	—		Liverpool (England)	1 - 3	Svensson 26'	-2
2	2 February	—		Manchester City (England)	3 - 1	Wernbloom 2'; Hysén 4'; Berg 70'	2
3	12 February	—		Dynamo Moscow (Russia)	1 - 1	Wallerstedt 68'	0
4	18 February	—		GKS Bełchatów (Poland)	2 - 2	Ranégie 70'; Wernbloom 79'	0
5	26 February	—		IF Elfsborg	3 - 2	Wernbloom 49', 67', 79'	1
6	6 March	—		Stabæk (Norway)	2 - 1	Wallerstedt 84'; Berg 89'	1
7	12 March	—		Las Palmas (Spain)	1 - 2	D. Alexandersson 21'	-1
8	18 March	—		FC Trollhättan	3 - 0	Ranégie 12'; Wallerstedt 50'; Selakovic 90'	3
9	18 June	—		IF Elfsborg	1 - 3	Eriksson 62'	-2
10	18 March	—		Stabæk (Norway)	0 - 0		0
11	9 October	—		Atalanta (Italy)	0 - 4		-4

Last updated: 8 November
Source: IFK Göteborg
^{1}IFK Göteborg goals come first.
Country's flag depict country of foreign team to that of IFK Göteborg.
Ground: H = Home; A = Away; N = Neutral; HR = Home replacement; AR = Away replacement; GD = Goal difference

== Sources ==
IFK Göteborg - Results & Fixtures at Soccerway
