= 2007 Svenska Cupen final =

- Event: 2007 Svenska Cupen
Kalmar FF	IFK Göteborg
3	0
- Date: 27 September 2007
- Venue: Fredriksskans, Kalmar
- Referee: Martin Ingvarsson
- Attendance: 6,877

The 2007 Svenska Cupen Final took place on September 27, 2007 at Fredriksskans in Kalmar. The match was contested by Kalmar FF, who then was placed 4th in Allsvenskan, and leaders IFK Göteborg. This was the first final to be played at the venue of the home drawn team. Kalmar FF, who before the match had won the cup two times, played their first final since 1987. IFK Göteborg, who had won the cup four times, played their first final since 2004.

Kalmar FF won the final comfortably after a strong performance. Brazilian striker César Santin scored two goals and Patrik Ingelsten one.

== Road to the Final ==
Kalmar FF		IFK Göteborg
Högaborgs BK [D2] A 2-5	Second round	Ängelholms FF [D1] A 2-2 (AET), 1-4 (p)
IFK Värnamo [D1] A 1-5	Third round	Ljungby IF [D2] A 1-6
Skövde AIK [D1] A 3-3 (AET), 3-4 (p)	Fourth round	Gefle IF [AS] H 3-0
Östers IF [SE] A 0-1	Quarter finals	Mjällby AIF [SE] A 1-2 (AET)
Väsby United [D1] A 1-4	Semi finals	Landskrona BoIS [SE] H 4-0

- Square brackets [ ] represent the opposition's division.

== Match details ==
27 September 2007
19:00 CEST

Kalmar FF	3–0	IFK Göteborg
Santin 22', 88' (pen.); Ingelsten 65'	Report

Fredriksskans, Kalmar
Attendance: 6,877
Referee: Martin Ingvarsson

Kalmar FF	IFK Göteborg

GK	1	(Sweden) Petter Wastå
RB	2	(France) Arthur Sorin
CB	5	(Sweden) Tobias Carlsson
CB	14	(Sweden) Patrik Rosengren
LB	6	(Sweden) Mikael Eklund
CM	8	(Sweden) Henrik Rydström (c)
CM	17	(Sweden) Viktor Elm
RM	10	(Sweden) Patrik Ingelsten
CM	18	(Sweden) Rasmus Elm
LM	25	(Brazil) César Santin
FW	13	(Sweden) David Elm
Substitutes:
DF	3	(Sweden) Joachim Lantz
DF	9	(Sweden) Stefan Larsson
MF	21	(Sweden) Lasse Johansson
GK	22	(Sweden) Milan Barjaktarevic
FW	29	(Brazil) Givaldo Oliveira
Manager:
(Sweden) Nanne Bergstrand

GK	1	(Sweden) Bengt Andersson
RB	6	(Sweden) Adam Johansson		(substituted off) 70'
CB	5	(Sweden) Mattias Bjärsmyr	(yellow card) 44'
CB	22	(Iceland) Ragnar Sigurðsson
LB	14	(Iceland) Hjalmar Jónsson
RM	10	(Sweden) Niclas Alexandersson (c)		(substituted off) 73'
CM	13	(Sweden) Gustav Svensson
CM	8	(Sweden) Thomas Olsson	(yellow card) 53'
LM	7	(Sweden) Tobias Hysén		(substituted off) 79'
FW	19	(Sweden) Pontus Wernbloom
FW	18	(Sweden) Jonas Wallerstedt	(yellow card) 86'
Substitutes:
MF	9	(Sweden) Stefan Selakovic	(yellow card) 87'	(substituted in) 79'
DF	16	(Sweden) Magnus Johansson
FW	17	(Sweden) George Mourad		(substituted in) 70'
MF	20	(Sweden) Eldin Karisik		(substituted in) 63'
GK	25	(Sweden) Erik Dahlin
Manager:
(Sweden) Stefan Rehn (Sweden) Jonas Olsson

== See also ==
- 2007 Svenska Cupen
