= 2008 in Swedish football =

The 2008 season in Swedish football, starting January 2008 and ending December 2008:

== Honours ==
=== Official titles ===
Title	Team	Reason
Swedish Champions 2008	Kalmar FF	Winners of Allsvenskan
Swedish Cup Champions 2008	IFK Göteborg	Winners of Svenska Cupen
Swedish Super Cup Champions 2008	IFK Göteborg	Winners of Supercupen

=== Competitions ===
Level	Competition	Team
1st level	Allsvenskan 2008	Kalmar FF
2nd level	Superettan 2008	Örgryte IS
3rd level	Division 1 Norra 2008	Syrianska FC
3rd level	Division 1 Södra 2008	FC Trollhättan
Cup	Svenska Cupen 2008	IFK Göteborg
Super Cup	Supercupen 2008	IFK Göteborg

== Promotions, relegations and qualifications ==
=== Promotions ===
Promoted from	Promoted to	Team	Reason
Superettan 2008	Allsvenskan 2009	Örgryte IS	Winners
Superettan 2008	Allsvenskan 2009	BK Häcken	2nd team
Superettan 2008	Allsvenskan 2009	IF Brommapojkarna	Winners of qualification play-off
Division 1 Norra 2008	Superettan 2009	Syrianska FC	Winners
Division 1 Norra 2008	Superettan 2009	Vasalunds IF	Winners of qualification play-off
Division 1 Södra 2008	Superettan 2009	FC Trollhättan	Winners
Division 2 2008	Division 1 2009	Karlslunds IF	Winners of group
Division 2 2008	Division 1 2009	Kristianstads FF	Winners of group
Division 2 2008	Division 1 2009	IK Oddevold	Winners of group
Division 2 2008	Division 1 2009	Skellefteå FF	Winners of group
Division 2 2008	Division 1 2009	IK Sleipner	Winners of group
Division 2 2008	Division 1 2009	Syrianska IF Kerburan	Winners of group

=== Relegations ===
Relegated from	Relegated to	Team	Reason
Allsvenskan 2008	Superettan 2009	Ljungskile SK	Losers of qualification play-off
Allsvenskan 2008	Superettan 2009	GIF Sundsvall	15th team
Allsvenskan 2008	Superettan 2009	IFK Norrköping	16th team
Superettan 2008	Division 1 2009	IF Limhamn Bunkeflo	Losers of qualification play-off
Superettan 2008	Division 1 2009	Enköpings SK	15th team
Superettan 2008	Division 1 2009	Degerfors IF	16th team
Division 1 Norra 2008	Division 2 2009	Ersboda SK	12th team
Division 1 Norra 2008	Division 2 2009	Falu FK	13th team
Division 1 Norra 2008	Division 2 2009	Bodens BK	14th team
Division 1 Södra 2008	Division 2 2009	IFK Malmö	12th team
Division 1 Södra 2008	Division 2 2009	Norrby IF	13th team
Division 1 Södra 2008	Division 2 2009	Skärhamns IK	14th team

=== International qualifications ===
Qualified for	Enters	Team	Reason
UEFA Champions League 2009–10	1st qual. round	Kalmar FF	Winners of Allsvenskan
UEFA Europa League 2009–10	3rd qual. round	IFK Göteborg	Winners of Svenska Cupen
UEFA Europa League 2009–10	2nd qual. round	IF Elfsborg	2nd team in Allsvenskan
UEFA Europa League 2009–10	1st qual. round	Helsingborgs IF	3rd/4th team in Allsvenskan

== Domestic results ==
=== Allsvenskan ===
Pos	Team	Pld	W	D	L	GF	GA	GD	Pts	Qualification or relegation
1	Kalmar FF (C)	30	20	4	6	70	32	+38	64	Qualification to Champions League second qualifying round
2	IF Elfsborg	30	19	6	5	49	18	+31	63	Qualification to Europa League second qualifying round
3	IFK Göteborg	30	15	9	6	50	26	+24	54	Qualification to Europa League third qualifying round (Note: IFK Göteborg qualified for the Third qualifying round of the UEFA Europa League as Svenska Cupen champions 2008.)
4	Helsingborgs IF	30	16	6	8	54	41	+13	54	Qualification to Europa League first qualifying round (Note: Helsingborg qualified for the UEFA Europa League as they received IFK Göteborg's initial qualifying spot.)
5	AIK	30	12	9	9	36	32	+4	45	
6	Malmö FF	30	12	8	10	51	46	+5	44	
7	Örebro SK	30	11	9	10	36	39	−3	42	
8	Halmstads BK	30	11	8	11	41	38	+3	41	
9	Hammarby IF	30	11	8	11	44	51	−7	41	
10	Trelleborgs FF	30	9	13	8	33	31	+2	40	
11	GAIS	30	9	11	10	30	36	−6	38	
12	Djurgårdens IF	30	9	9	12	30	41	−11	36	
13	Gefle IF	30	7	7	16	33	42	−9	28	
14	Ljungskile SK (R)	30	6	6	18	23	52	−29	24	Qualification to Relegation play-offs
15	GIF Sundsvall (R)	30	5	7	18	26	54	−28	22	Relegation to Superettan
16	IFK Norrköping (R)	30	4	8	18	31	58	−27	20	Relegation to Superettan

Source: svenskfotboll.se (in Swedish)
Rules for classification: 1) points; 2) goal difference; 3) number of goals scored.
(C) Champions; (R) Relegated

=== 2008 Allsvenskan qualification play-off ===
November 13, 2008
19:00 CET (UTC+01)

IF Brommapojkarna	0–0	Ljungskile SK

Grimsta IP, Stockholm
Attendance: 2,072
Referee: Markus Strömbergsson
November 16, 2008
15:00 CET (UTC+01)

Ljungskile SK	1–1	IF Brommapojkarna
Wålemark 48'		Haglund 45+3'

H.A. Bygg Arena, Ljungskile
Attendance: 2,828
Referee: Daniel Stålhammar

=== Superettan ===
Pos	Team	Pld	W	D	L	GF	GA	GD	Pts	Promotion, qualification or relegation
1	Örgryte IS (C, P)	30	17	6	7	57	32	+25	57	Promotion to Allsvenskan
2	BK Häcken (P)	30	15	10	5	58	28	+30	55	Promotion to Allsvenskan
3	IF Brommapojkarna (O, P)	30	16	6	8	45	29	+16	54	Qualification to Promotion playoffs
4	Assyriska FF	30	15	7	8	49	35	+14	52	
5	Ängelholms FF	30	14	9	7	51	33	+18	51	
6	Åtvidabergs FF	30	14	8	8	43	37	+6	50	
7	Falkenbergs FF	30	12	8	10	43	38	+5	44	
8	Mjällby AIF	30	12	7	11	44	36	+8	43	
9	FC Väsby United	30	11	6	13	38	36	+2	39	
10	Qviding FIF	30	9	11	10	39	41	−2	38	
11	Landskrona BoIS	30	10	8	12	36	44	−8	38	
12	IK Sirius	30	8	9	13	38	53	−15	33	
13	IF Limhamn Bunkeflo (R)	30	5	11	14	26	48	−22	26	Qualification to Relegation playoffs
14	Jönköpings Södra IF (O)	30	5	11	14	26	50	−24	26	Qualification to Relegation playoffs
15	Enköpings SK (R)	30	8	2	20	37	70	−33	26	Relegation to Division 1
16	Degerfors IF (R)	30	5	9	16	27	47	−20	24	Relegation to Division 1

Source: svenskfotboll.se (in Swedish)
Rules for classification: 1) points; 2) goal difference; 3) number of goals scored.
(C) Champions; (O) Play-off winners; (P) Promoted; (R) Relegated

=== 2008 Superettan qualification play-off ===
October 29, 2008

Östers IF	2–1	Jönköpings Södra IF

Värendsvallen, Växjö
November 2, 2008

Jönköpings Södra IF	3–0	Östers IF

Stadsparksvallen, Jönköping

October 29, 2008

Vasalunds IF	0–0	IF Limhamn Bunkeflo

Skytteholms IP, Solna
November 2, 2008

IF Limhamn Bunkeflo	1–4	Vasalunds IF

Malmö IP, Malmö

=== 2008 Division 1 Norra ===
Pos	Team	Pld	W	D	L	GF	GA	GD	Pts	Promotion or relegation
1	Syrianska FC (C, P)	26	17	8	1	44	16	+28	59	Promotion to Superettan
2	Vasalunds IF (O, P)	26	15	6	5	57	26	+31	51	Qualification to Promotion playoffs
3	Västerås SK	26	16	3	7	59	36	+23	51	
4	Gröndal	26	15	5	6	49	33	+16	50	
5	Umeå FC	26	13	2	11	43	38	+5	41	
6	Valsta Syrianska IK	26	10	6	10	41	40	+1	36	
7	BK Forward	26	10	4	12	46	49	−3	34	
8	Syrianska Botkyrka IF	26	8	7	11	26	35	−9	31	
9	IF Sylvia	26	9	3	14	41	56	−15	30	
10	Östersunds FK	26	7	8	11	30	36	−6	29	
11	IK Brage	26	6	8	12	35	43	−8	26	
12	Ersboda (R)	26	7	4	15	48	67	−19	25	Relegation to Division 2
13	Falu FK (R)	26	7	3	16	31	49	−18	24	Relegation to Division 2
14	Boden (R)	26	5	7	14	27	53	−26	22	Relegation to Division 2

Source: svenskfotboll.se (in Swedish)
Rules for classification: 1) points; 2) goal difference; 3) number of goals scored.
(C) Champions; (O) Play-off winners; (P) Promoted; (R) Relegated

=== 2008 Division 1 Södra ===
Pos	Team	Pld	W	D	L	GF	GA	GD	Pts	Promotion or relegation
1	FC Trollhättan (C, P)	26	14	7	5	41	26	+15	49	Promotion to Superettan
2	Östers IF	26	14	3	9	54	33	+21	45	Qualification to Promotion playoffs
3	Carlstad United BK	26	13	6	7	43	37	+6	45	
4	Malmö Anadolu	26	13	5	8	53	38	+15	44	
5	Skövde AIK	26	12	6	8	54	39	+15	42	
6	Motala AIF	26	11	6	9	41	46	−5	39	
7	IFK Värnamo	26	11	5	10	31	31	0	38	
8	Västra Frölunda	26	8	11	7	45	41	+4	35	
9	Lindome	26	8	8	10	36	33	+3	32	
10	Torslanda IK	26	8	8	10	40	45	−5	32	
11	Husqvarna FF	26	8	4	14	29	35	−6	28	
12	IFK Malmö (R)	26	8	3	15	38	63	−25	27	Relegation to Division 2
13	Norrby IF (R)	26	8	2	16	38	52	−14	26	Relegation to Division 2
14	Skärhamn (R)	26	7	4	15	27	61	−34	25	Relegation to Division 2

Source: svenskfotboll.se (in Swedish)
Rules for classification: 1) points; 2) goal difference; 3) number of goals scored.
(C) Champions; (P) Promoted; (R) Relegated

=== 2008 Svenska Cupen ===
Quarter-finals

July 10, 2008

IFK Norrköping	2–2 (a.e.t.)	Enköpings SK
Penalties
	4–5

Idrottsparken, Norrköping

July 10, 2008

GIF Sundsvall	2–3	IFK Göteborg

Norrporten Arena, Sundsvall

July 24, 2008

Valsta Syrianska IK	0–4	Hammarby IF

Midgårdsvallen, Märsta

August 7, 2008

IF Elfsborg	2–4	Kalmar FF

Borås Arena, Elfsborg

Semi-finals

August 21, 2008

Hammarby IF	0–1 (a.e.t.)	Kalmar FF

Söderstadion, Stockholm

August 28, 2008

Enköpings SK	0–3	IFK Göteborg

Enavallen, Enköping

Final

September 21, 2008
15:00 CEST (UTC+02)

Kalmar FF	0–0 (a.e.t.)	IFK Göteborg
Penalties
Rydström (penalty scored); Johansson (penalty scored); V. Elm (penalty scored); Sobralense (penalty scored); Lindberg (penalty missed)	4–5	(penalty scored) Alexandersson; (penalty scored) Christensen; (penalty scored) Sigurðsson; (penalty scored) Jónsson; (penalty scored) Wernbloom

Fredriksskans, Kalmar
Attendance: 7,158
Referee: Peter Fröjdfeldt

=== 2008 Supercupen ===
Final

March 22, 2008
16:00 CET (UTC+01)

IFK Göteborg	3–1	Kalmar FF
Wallerstedt 24' 82'; Jónsson 67'		Santin 87'

Nya Ullevi, Gothenburg
Attendance: 1,643
Referee: Martin Hansson
