= 2008 Svenska Supercupen =

- Event: Svenska Supercupen
IFK Göteborg	Kalmar FF
3	1
- Date: 22 March 2008
- Venue: Ullevi, Gothenburg
- Referee: Martin Hansson (Holmsjö)
- Attendance: 1,643

2008 Svenska Supercupen (Swedish Super Cup 2008) was the 2nd edition Svenska Supercupen annual football match that Allsvenskan champions IFK Göteborg successfully pursued the competition title by defeating Svenska Cupen winners Kalmar FF, 1-0. The match was played on 22 March 2008 at Ullevi in Gothenburg.

Jonas Wallerstedt gave IFK the lead in halftime in the 24th minute. Later, in the 67th minute, Hjálmar Jónsson scored on a freekick from distance and Wallerstedt got his second of the afternoon in the 82nd minute. César Santin got one back for Kalmar in the 87th minute.

== Match facts ==
22 March 2008
16:00 CEST

IFK Göteborg	3–1	Kalmar FF
Wallerstedt 24', 82'; Jonsson 67'	(Report)	Santin 87'

Ullevi, Gothenburg
Attendance: 1,643
Referee: Martin Hansson (Holmsjö)

IFK Göteborg	Kalmar FF

IFK GÖTEBORG:
GK	1	(Denmark) Kim Christensen
RB	10	(Sweden) Niclas Alexandersson (c)
CB	5	(Sweden) Mattias Bjärsmyr
CB	22	(Iceland) Ragnar Sigurdsson
LB	14	(Iceland) Hjálmar Jónsson
RM	24	(Sweden) Jonatan Berg	(substituted off) 81'
CM	13	(Sweden) Gustav Svensson
CM	20	(Sweden) Eldin Karisik
LM	7	(Sweden) Tobias Hysén	(substituted off) 77'
FW	19	(Sweden) Pontus Wernbloom
FW	18	(Sweden) Jonas Wallerstedt	(substituted off) 86'
Substitutes:
GK	12	(Sweden) David Stenman
DF	2	(Sweden) Sebastian Eriksson
MF	17	(Sweden) Daniel Alexandersson	(substituted in) 77'
FW	9	(Sweden) Stefan Selakovic	(substituted in) 86'
FW	11	(Sweden) Mathias Ranégie	(substituted in) 81'
Manager:
(Sweden) Jonas Olsson (Sweden) Stefan Rehn

KALMAR FF:
GK	1	(Sweden) Petter Wastå
RB	2	(France) Arthur Sorin
CB	4	(Sweden) Marcus Lindberg
CB	14	(Sweden) Patrik Rosengren
LB	6	(Sweden) Mikael Eklund
RM	10	(Sweden) Patrik Ingelsten		(substituted off) 77'
CM	18	(Sweden) Rasmus Elm
DM	8	(Sweden) Henrik Rydström (c)
CM	17	(Sweden) Viktor Elm
LM	25	(Brazil) César Santin
FW	13	(Sweden) David Elm	(yellow card) 36'	(substituted off) 73'
Substitutes:
GK	32	(Sweden) Zlatan Azinovic
DF	3	(Sweden) Joachim Lantz
DF	9	(Sweden) Stefan Larsson		(substituted in) 77'
MF	12	(Brazil) Daniel Lopes Silva		(substituted in) 73'
MF	21	(Sweden) Lasse Johansson
Manager:
(Sweden) Nanne Bergstrand
