= Lidholm =

Lidholm is a Swedish surname. Notable people with the surname include:

- David Lidholm (born 1982), Swedish footballer
- Ingvar Lidholm (1921–2017), Swedish composer
- Matt Benson-Lidholm (born 1952), Australian politician
