= Jakob Johansson =

Swedish footballer (born 1990)

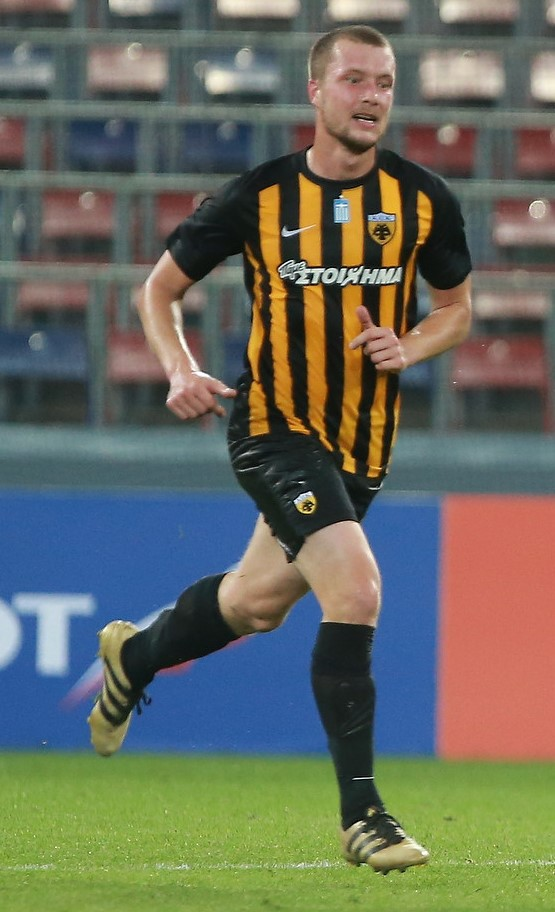
- Johansson with AEK Athens in 2017

Personal information
- Full name: Jakob Valdemar Olsson Johansson
- Date of birth: 21 June 1990 (age 36)
- Place of birth: Trollhättan, Sweden
- Height: 1.87 m (6 ft 2 in)
- Positions: Midfielder; centre-back

Youth career
- –2005: Trollhättans BoIS

Senior career*
Years	Team	Apps	(Gls)
2005–2006	Trollhättans BoIS		
2006–2007	FC Trollhättan	20	(0)
2007–2014	IFK Göteborg	163	(18)
2014–2018	AEK Athens	96	(7)
2018–2019	Rennes II	2	(0)
2018–2020	Rennes	16	(1)
2020–2021	IFK Göteborg	18	(0)
Total		315	(26)

International career
2006–2007	Sweden U17	13	(6)
2008–2010	Sweden U19	12	(1)
2009–2012	Sweden U21	15	(2)
2013–2019	Sweden	18	(1)
- * Club domestic league appearances and goals

Jakob Johansson (born 21 June 1990) is a Swedish former professional footballer who played as a midfielder. Becoming the first player born in the 1990s to play in Allsvenskan while at IFK Göteborg, he went on to represent AEK Athens and Rennes before retiring at IFK Göteborg in 2021. A full international between 2013 and 2019, he won 18 caps for the Sweden national team and is best remembered for scoring the winning goal in the 2018 FIFA World Cup qualifying playoffs against Italy when Sweden qualified for their first FIFA World Cup in 12 years.

== Club career ==
=== IFK Göteborg ===
Born in Trollhättan, Johansson's first club was Trollhättans BoIS. He was brought to IFK Göteborg, together with manager Jonas Olsson, from FC Trollhättan. On 27 June 2007, he became the first player born in the 1990s to have played in the top league of Sweden, Allsvenskan when he debuted for his IFK Göteborg.

=== AEK Athens ===
On 28 December 2014, Johansson signed a 3.5-year contract with AEK Athens. On 22 August 2015, he made his debut in Super League Greece helping his team AEK win 3–0 against Platanias. On 22 November 2015, he scored his first season goal with a header in AEK Athens' away win against Panthrakikos. On 21 December 2015, the 15th matchday of the season, he again netted with a header giving his club the lead in 2–1 home defeat against Levadiakos. He finished the 2015–16 season with seven goals, including a header against Panathinaikos in a 3–1 victory.

Johansson started the 2016–17 season as a key player in midfield. In the late days of July 2017 AEK made a last effort to extend Johansson's contract, which is set to expire on 30 June 2018. On 20 August 2017, he scored in the opening match of the season against Panetolikos, which ended as a 2–0 home win. Johansson started the season as a starter, but his serious injury in November 2017, combined with his desire not to renew his contract with the club, resulted in him being left out of the manager's plans.

=== Rennes ===
Johansson signed for the Ligue 1 club Rennes in the summer of 2018.

=== Return to IFK Göteborg and retirement ===
In 2020, he return to IFK Göteborg after six years abroad. On 22 June 2021, after suffering many injuries in the latest years, he decided to retire from professional football at the age of only 31.

== International career ==
Johansson made his international debut in a friendly against North Korea on 23 January 2013. He made his competitive debut in a 2018 FIFA World Cup qualifier against France on 11 November 2016. On 10 November 2017 the Swedes won against Italy 1–0 in the 2018 FIFA World Cup Second Round first leg at the Friends Arena, and the only goal coming when Jakob Johansson drilled home from 20 yards, via a Daniele De Rossi deflection. On 13 November 2017, in the game where Sweden held on to force a goalless draw in the second leg at the San Siro to defeat the Italians 1–0 on aggregate in their Russia 2018 World Cup play-off, Johansson faced an anterior cruciate ligament injury that kept him out for 11 months. Consequently, he also missed the 2018 FIFA World Cup.

== Style of play ==
Johansson was a box-to-box midfielder, with his stand-out features being his physical strength, marking, accurate passing and overall significance in build-up play.

== Personal life ==
His older brother, Rickard is a former goalkeeper.

== Career statistics ==
=== Club ===
Appearances and goals by club, season and competition
Club	Season	League			National cup (Note: Includes Svenska Cupen, Greek Cup, Coupe de France)		Europe		Total	
Club	Season	Division	Apps	Goals	Apps	Goals	Apps	Goals	Apps	Goals
IFK Göteborg	2007	Allsvenskan	9	0	4	0	—		13	0
IFK Göteborg	2008	Allsvenskan	15	2	4	2	0	0	19	4
IFK Göteborg	2009	Allsvenskan	17	1	3	1	1	0	21	2
IFK Göteborg	2010	Allsvenskan	26	4	2	2	2	0	30	6
IFK Göteborg	2011	Allsvenskan	20	2	3	0	—		23	2
IFK Göteborg	2012	Allsvenskan	22	0	1	0	—		23	0
IFK Göteborg	2013	Allsvenskan	27	5	7	1	2	0	36	6
IFK Göteborg	2014	Allsvenskan	27	4	5	1	6	1	38	6
IFK Göteborg	Total		163	18	29	7	11	1	203	26
AEK Athens	2014–15	Super League Greece 2	21	1	5	0	—		26	1
AEK Athens	2015–16	Super League Greece	34	5	8	2	—		42	7
AEK Athens	2016–17	Super League Greece	33	0	5	1	1	0	39	1
AEK Athens	2017–18	Super League Greece	8	1	1	0	8	0	14	1
AEK Athens	Total		96	7	19	3	9	0	124	10
Rennes	2018–19	Ligue 1	16	1	2	0	4	0	22	1
Rennes	2019–20	Ligue 1	0	0	0	0	0	0	0	0
Rennes	Total		16	1	2	0	4	0	22	1
IFK Göteborg	2020	Allsvenskan	18	0	1	0	1	0	20	0
IFK Göteborg	2021	Allsvenskan	0	0	0	0	—		0	0
IFK Göteborg	Total		18	0	1	0	1	0	20	0
Career total			293	26	51	10	25	1	369	37

=== International ===
Appearances and goals by national team and year
National team	Year	Apps	Goals
Sweden	2013	1	0
Sweden	2014	2	0
Sweden	2015	0	0
Sweden	2016	2	0
Sweden	2017	10	1
Sweden	2018	2	0
Sweden	2019	1	0
Total		18	1

International goals

Scores and results list Sweden's goal tally first.

No.	Date	Venue	Opponent	Score	Result	Competition
1	10 November 2017	Friends Arena, Solna, Sweden	Italy	1–0	1–0	2018 FIFA World Cup qualification

== Honours ==
IFK Göteborg

- Allsvenskan: 2007
- Svenska Cupen: 2008, 2012–13, 2019–20

AEK Athens

- Super League Greece: 2017–18
- Greek Cup: 2015–16
- Football League: 2014–15 (South Group)

Rennes

- Coupe de France: 2018–19

Individual

- Årets ärkeängel (IFK Göteborg player of the year as decided by the supporters): 2012
