= Sebastian Eriksson =

Swedish footballer

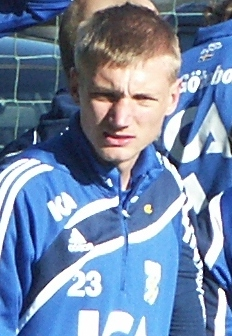
- Eriksson in 2009

Personal information
- Full name: Sebastian Anders; Fredrik Eriksson
- Date of birth: 31 January 1989 (age 37)
- Place of birth: Mellerud, Sweden
- Height: 1.84 m (6 ft 0 in)
- Positions: Midfielder; defender

Youth career
- –2005: Åsebro IF
- 2005–2006: IFK Göteborg

Senior career*
Years	Team	Apps	(Gls)
2004–2005	Åsebro IF		
2007–2012	IFK Göteborg	81	(5)
2011–2012	→ Cagliari (loan)	1	(0)
2012–2015	Cagliari	28	(0)
2015	→ IFK Göteborg (loan)	11	(2)
2015–2018	IFK Göteborg	82	(2)
2018–2019	Panetolikos	6	(1)
2019	IFK Göteborg	16	(2)
2020	Genoa	0	(0)
2020–2023	IFK Göteborg	60	(2)
Total		285	(14)

International career
2006–2008	Sweden U19	12	(2)
2008–2010	Sweden U21	16	(0)
2010–2016	Sweden	7	(0)
- * Club domestic league appearances and goals

Sebastian Anders Fredrik Eriksson (born 31 January 1989) is a Swedish former professional footballer who played as a midfielder. He represented IFK Göteborg in Allsvenskan for a majority of his career, but has also played for Cagliari and Genoa in Serie A as well as Panetolikos in Super League Greece.

== Club career ==
On 23 January 2020, Eriksson joined Italian club Genoa. On 24 August 2020, he returned to IFK Göteborg for a fourth stay. He left the club after the 2023 season, and announced his retirement on 28 February 2024.

== International career ==
Eriksson earned seven international caps for Sweden, starting with a 1–0 friendly away win against Oman on 20 January 2010. He also represented Sweden in a tour in South Africa in January 2011, as well as in the Cyprus International Tournament in February the same year. His final two caps came in January 2016.

== Career statistics ==
=== Club ===
Appearances and goals by club, season and competition
Club	Season	League			Cup		Continental		Total	
Club	Season	Division	Apps	Goals	Apps	Goals	Apps	Goals	Apps	Goals
IFK Göteborg	2007	Allsvenskan	0	0	1	0	—		1	0
IFK Göteborg	2008	Allsvenskan	17	1	5	1	4	0	26	2
IFK Göteborg	2009	Allsvenskan	25	1	4	1	2	0	31	2
IFK Göteborg	2010	Allsvenskan	26	1	1	0	0	0	27	1
IFK Göteborg	2011	Allsvenskan	13	2	3	1	—		16	3
IFK Göteborg	Total		81	5	14	3	6	0	101	8
Cagliari	2011–12	Serie A	1	0	0	0	—		1	0
Cagliari	2012–13	Serie A	8	0	2	0	—		10	0
Cagliari	2013–14	Serie A	20	0	0	0	—		20	0
Cagliari	2014–15	Serie A	0	0	0	0	—		0	0
Cagliari	Total		29	0	2	0	0	0	31	0
IFK Göteborg	2015	Allsvenskan	27	2	5	1	4	0	36	3
IFK Göteborg	2016	Allsvenskan	28	0	4	0	7	0	39	0
IFK Göteborg	2017	Allsvenskan	27	2	4	0	—		31	2
IFK Göteborg	2018	Allsvenskan	11	0	4	0	—		15	0
IFK Göteborg	Total		93	4	17	1	11	0	121	5
Panetolikos	2018–19	Super League Greece	6	1	0	0	—		6	1
IFK Göteborg	2019	Allsvenskan	16	2	0	0	—		16	2
Genoa	2019–20	Serie A	0	0	—		—		0	0
IFK Göteborg	2020	Allsvenskan	5	0	1	1	0	0	6	1
IFK Göteborg	2021	Allsvenskan	16	1	2	0	—		18	1
IFK Göteborg	2022	Allsvenskan	17	1	1	0	—		18	1
IFK Göteborg	2023	Allsvenskan	22	0	0	0	—		22	0
IFK Göteborg	Total		60	2	4	1	0	0	64	3
Career total			285	14	37	5	17	0	339	19

=== International ===
Appearances and goals by national team and year
National team	Year	Apps	Goals
Sweden	2010	1	0
Sweden	2011	4	0
Sweden	2012	0	0
Sweden	2013	0	0
Sweden	2014	0	0
Sweden	2015	0	0
Sweden	2016	2	0
Total		7	0

== Honours ==
IFK Göteborg

- Svenska Cupen: 2008, 2014–15
- Svenska Supercupen: 2008

Individual

- Årets Ärkeängel: 2017
