= Mathias Ranégie =

Swedish footballer (born 1984)

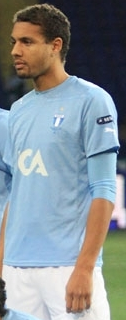
- Ranégie playing for Malmö FF in 2011

Personal information
- Full name: Mathias Ranégie
- Date of birth: 14 June 1984 (age 42)
- Place of birth: Gothenburg, Sweden
- Height: 1.97 m (6 ft 6 in)
- Position: Striker

Youth career
- Göteborgs FF
- Masthuggets BK

Senior career*
Years	Team	Apps	(Gls)
2002–2004	Levallois SC		
2005	Majornas IK		
2006	Lärje-Angereds IF	19	(25)
2007–2008	IFK Göteborg	14	(1)
2008	→ Go Ahead Eagles (loan)	5	(1)
2009–2011	BK Häcken	81	(36)
2011–2012	Malmö FF	26	(13)
2012–2014	Udinese	24	(1)
2014–2017	Watford	10	(4)
2014	→ Millwall (loan)	7	(0)
2015	→ Dalian Aerbin (loan)	28	(11)
2016	→ Djurgårdens IF (loan)	25	(6)
2017	→ Udinese (loan)	0	(0)
2017	BK Häcken	10	(1)
2018–2020	Syrianska FC	23	(15)
Total		272	(114)

International career
2010–2013	Sweden	5	(1)
- * Club domestic league appearances and goals

Mathias Ranégie (Swedish: [maˈtîːas raˈněːɡɪ]; born 14 June 1984) is a Swedish former professional footballer who played as a striker.

== Club career ==
=== Early career ===
He started his career in Masthuggets BK, but left Sweden to be with his Guadeloupean father in Paris, France, he then started to play for Levallois SC in Championnat de France amateur. He then returned to Sweden and Gothenburg and played for Majorna BK for one year before they expend their senior team, he then moved to Lärje-Angereds IF where IFK Göteborg got interested in him and signed him prior to the 2007 season, however due to poor performance he only played 14 games and was in the autumn of 2008 loaned out to Go Ahead Eagles in the Dutch Eerste Divisie, yet a continuing injury made the Dutch club break the loan contract ahead of time.

=== Häcken ===
In 2009, he signed for IFK Göteborg's local rivals and newly promoted BK Häcken. His first season for his new club proved to be a success as he played 29 games (25 from start) and scored six goals during the team's successful campaign ending at an impressive fifth place in Allsvenskan. Following his successful 2009 season he was hailed by many as a future star and a possible candidate for the top scorer title in Allsvenskan 2010.

During the season 2011, it became apparent that Ranégie had improved since his season of 2010 when he scored 12 goals in 30 games. He immediately took a place as the topscorer in Allsvenskan 2011 and when he left the club he had scored 18 goals in 22 games.

=== Malmö FF ===
On 30 August 2011 Ranégie signed with Swedish champions Malmö FF. The transfer sum was one of the highest ever paid between two Swedish clubs. Ranégie made his debut against Gefle IF on 8 September 2011 and scored his first goal against Halmstads BK on 21 September 2011. On 25 September 2011, Ranégie sealed the championship win for Helsingborgs IF of the 2011 season by scoring the 1–1 tying goal against AIK who were the only championship competitors to Helsingborgs IF at that time. In total Ranégie played seven matches and scored three goals for his first season at Malmö FF.

=== Udinese ===
On the last day of the transfer window, in August 2012, Ranégie transferred to Serie A club Udinese on a five-year contract. Mathias scored his first goal for Udinese on 24 September, a header against Milan in a 2–1 victory.

=== Watford ===
On 3 January 2014, Ranégie joined Watford from Udinese on a deal until 2017. Ranégie finally made his full Watford debut against Yeovil Town on 18 February 2014. Ranégie opened his Watford account on his home debut, scoring twice in a 4–0 win over Blackpool on 1 March 2014. He left Watford at the end of the 2016–17 season.

==== Loan to Millwall ====
After falling down the pecking order at Watford, Ranégie moved on loan to fellow Championship side Millwall on 28 August 2014, until 1 January 2015. He made his debut two days later as a substitute against Blackpool on 30 August 2014.

==== Loan to Dalian Aerbin ====
On 28 January 2015, Ranégie moved on loan to China League One side Dalian Aerbin, until 31 December 2015. Upon his return to Watford, Ranégie was informed that he was free to leave the club.

==== Loan to Djurgården ====
In February 2016, Ranégie joined Allsvenskan side Djurgården on a one-season loan. He played 24 league games throughout the campaign, scoring six goals.

=== Later career ===
Ranégie was released by Watford upon the expiry of his contract at the end of the 2016-17 season, having not played competitively for the now-Premier League side since 2014. On 11 August 2017, he returned to former club BK Häcken, six years after initially leaving. Ranégie played 10 games for the club, scoring once, before leaving on a free transfer in November 2017.

== International career ==
Following his performance during the 2009 season he was called up by the Sweden national team's coach Erik Hamrén for the 2010 January tour on the Arabian Peninsula. The squad selection for the camp traditionally feature the best Swedish players in domestic and other Scandinavian leagues. He was once again selected for 2012 tour but withdrew for personal reasons.

== Career statistics ==
=== Club ===
As of 6 November 2016

Appearances and goals by club, season and competition
Club	Season	League			Cup		Continental		Total	
Club	Season	Division	Apps	Goals	Apps	Goals	Apps	Goals	Apps	Goals
Lärje-Angereds IF	2006	Division 2	22	25	—		—		22	25
IFK Göteborg	2007	Allsvenskan	5	0	0	0	—		5	0
IFK Göteborg	2008	Allsvenskan	9	1	0	0	—		9	1
IFK Göteborg	Total		14	1	0	0	0	0	14	1
Go Ahead Eagles	2008–09	Eerste Divisie	5	1	0	0	—		5	1
BK Häcken	2009	Allsvenskan	29	6	0	0	—		29	6
BK Häcken	2010	Allsvenskan	30	12	1	0	—		31	12
BK Häcken	2011	Allsvenskan	22	18	1	0	5	2	28	20
BK Häcken	Total		81	36	2	0	5	2	88	38
Malmö FF	2011	Allsvenskan	7	3	0	0	6	2	13	5
Malmö FF	2012	Allsvenskan	19	10	1	2	–		20	12
Malmö FF	Total		26	13	1	2	6	2	33	17
Udinese	2012–13	Serie A	20	1	0	0	0	0	20	1
Udinese	2013–14	Serie A	4	0	0	0	0	0	4	0
Udinese	Total		24	1	0	0	0	0	24	1
Watford	2013–14	Championship	10	4	0	0	0	0	10	4
Watford	2014–15	Championship	0	0	0	0	0	0	0	0
Watford	Total		10	4	0	0	0	0	10	4
Millwall (loan)	2014–15	Championship	7	0	0	0	0	0	7	0
Dalian Aerbin (loan)	2015	China League One	28	11	0	0	-		28	11
Djurgårdens IF (loan)	2016	Allsvenskan	25	6	—		—		25	6
Career total			242	98	3	2	11	4	256	104

=== International ===
Appearances and goals by national team and year
National team	Year	Apps	Goals
Sweden	2010	2	1
Sweden	2011	0	0
Sweden	2012	2	0
Sweden	2013	1	0
Total		5	1

Scores and results list Sweden's goal tally first, score column indicates score after Ranégie goal.

International goal scored by Mathias Ranégie
No.	Date	Venue	Opponent	Score	Result	Competition
1	23 January 2010	Abbasiyyin Stadium, Damascus	Syria	1–1	1–1	Friendly

== Honours ==
IFK Göteborg

- Allsvenskan: 2007
- Svenska Cupen: 2008
- Svenska Supercupen: 2008

Individual

- Allsvenskan top scorer: 2011
