= Mattias Bjärsmyr =

Swedish footballer (born 1986)

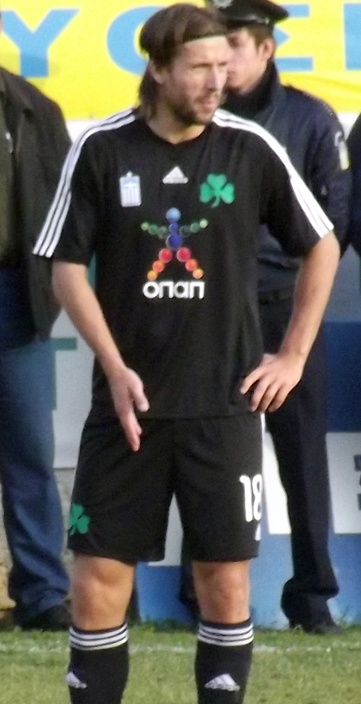
- Bjärsmyr with Panathinaikos in December 2011

Personal information
- Full name: Nils Erik Mattias Bjärsmyr
- Date of birth: 3 January 1986 (age 40)
- Place of birth: Hestra, Sweden
- Height: 1.86 m (6 ft 1 in)
- Position: Centre-back

Youth career
- 1991–2001: Hestra SSK

Senior career*
Years	Team	Apps	(Gls)
2000–2001	Hestra SSK		
2002	Grimsås IF		
2002–2004	Husqvarna FF	37	(0)
2005–2009	IFK Göteborg	104	(3)
2009–2012	Panathinaikos	26	(0)
2010–2011	→ Rosenborg (loan)	9	(0)
2012–2017	IFK Göteborg	118	(4)
2017–2019	Sivasspor	60	(0)
2019–2020	Gençlerbirliği	8	(0)
2020–2022	IFK Göteborg	66	(5)
2023–2024	Kungsbacka City	11	(1)
Total		439	(13)

International career
2003	Sweden U17	6	(1)
2004–2005	Sweden U19	10	(1)
2005–2009	Sweden U21	31	(0)
2008–2009	Sweden	3	(0)
- * Club domestic league appearances and goals

Nils Erik Mattias Bjärsmyr (born 3 January 1986) is a Swedish former professional footballer who played as a centre-back. Beginning his professional career with IFK Göteborg in 2005, he went on to play in Greece, Norway, and Turkey before retiring at IFK Göteborg in 2022. A full international between 2008 and 2009, he won three caps for the Sweden national team.

== Club career ==
After playing for a local club, Grimsås IF, and Husqvarna FF, Bjärsmyr joined IFK Göteborg in 2005. He made his first appearance for IFK Göteborg on 30 May 2005 as the club took on IF Elfsborg. He became a regular starter later in the year and was nominated best newcomer at the Swedish national football gala. On 15 July 2009, he signed a four-year contract for Panathinaikos in Super League Greece. On 29 Augusti 2012, he returned to IFK Göteborg. He had another stint abroad in Turkey between 2017 and 2020 before retiring at IFK Göteborg in 2022.

== International career ==
Bjärsmyr featured three times for the senior team. He made his debut in the Sweden national team on 13 January 2008 against Costa Rica. Bjärsmyr had previously served as the captain for Sweden U21 team, and he also captained Sweden's U21 team that competed in the 2009 UEFA European Under-21 Championship.

== Career statistics ==
=== Club ===
Appearances and goals by club, season and competition
Club	Season	League			Cup		Continental		Total	
Club	Season	Division	Apps	Goals	Apps	Goals	Apps	Goals	Apps	Goals
Husqvarna FF	2002	Division 2 Östra Götaland	1	0	0	0	—		1	0
Husqvarna FF	2003	Division 2 Östra Götaland	15	0	0	0	—		15	0
Husqvarna FF	2004	Division 2 Östra Götaland	21	0	0	0	—		21	0
Husqvarna FF	Total		37	0	0	0	0	0	37	0
IFK Göteborg	2005	Allsvenskan	19	0	2	0	6	0	27	0
IFK Göteborg	2006	Allsvenskan	20	0	1	0	2	0	23	0
IFK Göteborg	2007	Allsvenskan	25	2	5	1	—		30	3
IFK Göteborg	2008	Allsvenskan	27	1	6	0	4	0	37	1
IFK Göteborg	2009	Allsvenskan	13	0	0	0	—		13	0
IFK Göteborg	Total		104	3	14	1	12	0	130	4
Panathinaikos	2009–10	Super League Greece	17	0	3	0	5	0	25	0
Panathinaikos	2011–12	Super League Greece	9	0	2	0	0	0	11	0
Panathinaikos	Total		26	0	5	0	5	0	36	0
Rosenborg BK (loan)	2010	Tippeligaen	7	0	1	0	6	0	14	0
Rosenborg BK (loan)	2011	Tippeligaen	2	0	1	0	0	0	3	0
Rosenborg BK (loan)	Total		9	0	2	0	6	0	17	0
IFK Göteborg	2012	Allsvenskan	8	1	—		—		8	1
IFK Göteborg	2013	Allsvenskan	20	1	7	0	0	0	27	1
IFK Göteborg	2014	Allsvenskan	30	0	4	0	6	0	40	0
IFK Göteborg	2015	Allsvenskan	23	1	6	1	4	0	33	2
IFK Göteborg	2016	Allsvenskan	23	0	2	1	8	0	33	1
IFK Göteborg	2017	Allsvenskan	14	1	3	0	—		17	1
IFK Göteborg	Total		118	4	22	2	18	0	158	6
Sivasspor	2017–18	Süper Lig	32	0	0	0	—		32	0
Sivasspor	2018–19	Süper Lig	28	0	1	0	—		29	0
Sivasspor	Total		60	0	1	0	0	0	61	0
Gençlerbirliği	2019–20	Süper Lig	8	0	2	0	—		10	0
Gençlerbirliği	Total		8	0	2	0	0	0	10	0
IFK Göteborg	2020	Allsvenskan	20	4	5	0	1	0	26	4
IFK Göteborg	2021	Allsvenskan	30	1	5	0	—		35	1
IFK Göteborg	2022	Allsvenskan	16	0	1	0	—		17	0
IFK Göteborg	Total		66	5	11	0	1	0	78	5
Career total			428	12	57	3	42	0	527	15

=== International ===
Appearances and goals by national team and year
National team	Year	Apps	Goals
Sweden	2008	2	0
Sweden	2009	1	0
Total		3	0

== Honours ==
Husqvarna FF

- Division 2 Östra Götaland: 2002, 2004

IFK Göteborg

- Allsvenskan: 2007
- Svenska Cupen: 2008, 2012–13, 2014–15, 2019–20
- Svenska Supercupen: 2008

Panathinaikos

- Super League Greece: 2009–10
- Greek Football Cup: 2009–10

Rosenborg

- Tippeligaen: 2010
- Årets Ärkeängel: 2020
