= Magnus Johansson (footballer, born 1971) =

Swedish footballer

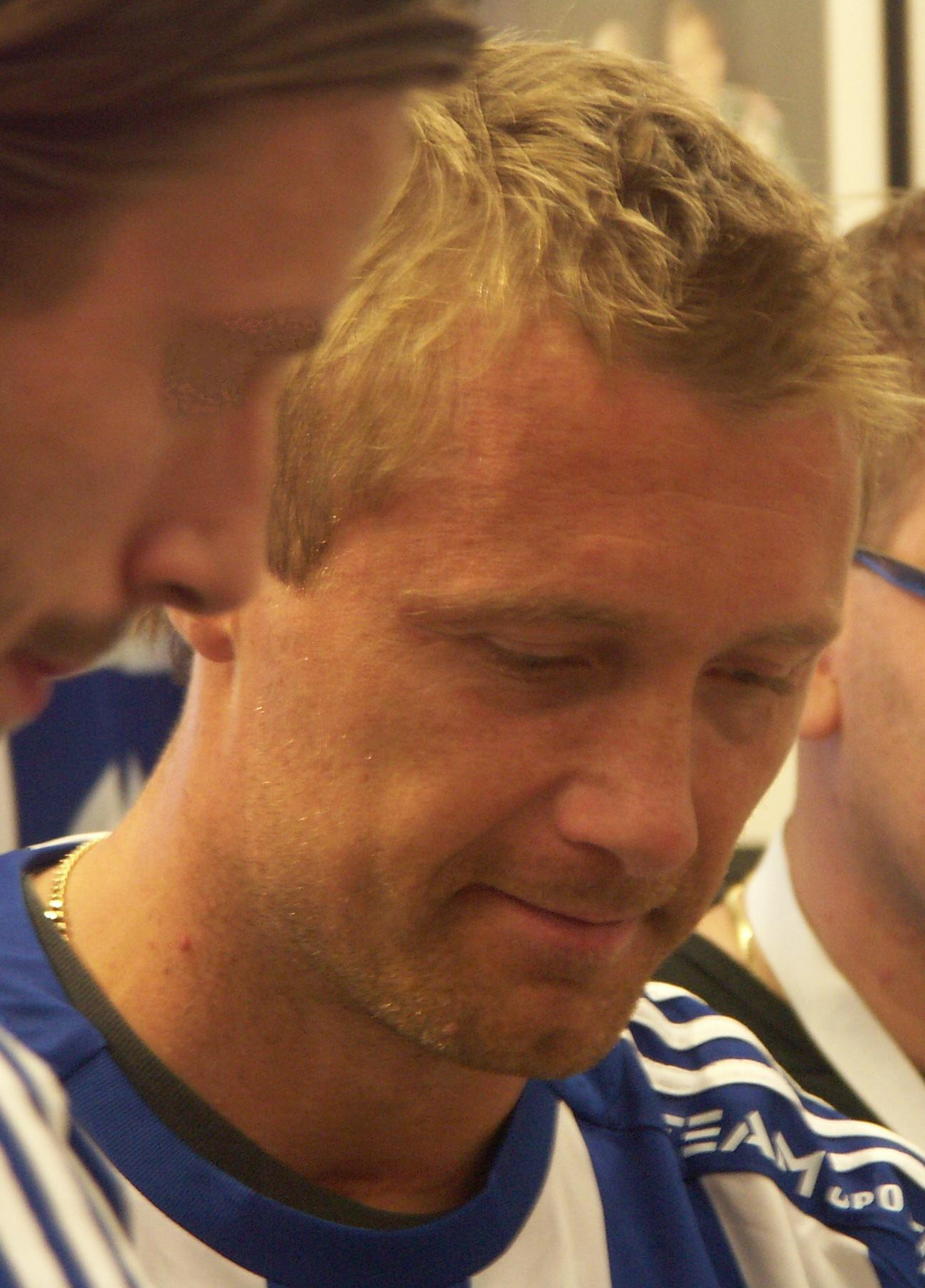
- Johansson in 2008

Personal information
- Full name: Leif Magnus Johansson
- Date of birth: 10 November 1971 (age 54)
- Place of birth: Ölme, Sweden
- Height: 1.79 m (5 ft 10 in)
- Position: Defender

Youth career
- –1987: IFK Ölme

Senior career*
Years	Team	Apps	(Gls)
1988–1998	IFK Göteborg	158	(3)
1998–2003	Groningen	83	(4)
2003–2007	IFK Göteborg	75	(4)
Total		316	(10)

International career
1988–1991	Sweden U18	28	(0)
1990–1993	Sweden U21/O	32	(0)
1995	Sweden	1	(0)
- * Club domestic league appearances and goals

Leif Magnus "Ölme" Johansson (born 10 November 1971) is a Swedish former professional footballer who played as a defender. After playing for IFK Ölme, he joined IFK Göteborg in 1990. He moved to the Dutch club FC Groningen in 1999 before rejoining IFK in 2003. He was a member of the Sweden squad that competed at the 1992 Summer Olympics in Barcelona. He is nicknamed Ölme after his first club. He retired after the 2007 season. Johansson earned one cap for Sweden in 1995.

== Career statistics ==
=== International ===
Appearances and goals by national team and year
National team	Year	Apps	Goals
Sweden	1995	1	0
Total		1	0

== Honours ==
IFK Göteborg

- Allsvenskan: 1990, 1991, 1993, 1994, 1995, 1996, 2007

Individual

- Årets Ärkeängel: 2005
