= David Lidholm =

Swedish footballer

Personal information
- Full name: Karl Gunnar David Lidholm
- Date of birth: 28 May 1982 (age 44)
- Place of birth: Skövde, Sweden
- Position: Defender

Team information
- Current team: Skövde AIK

Senior career*
Years	Team	Apps	(Gls)
2002–2003	Tidaholms GIF	41	(4)
2004	Hammarby Talang FF	10	(5)
2004–2011	Hammarby IF	168	(7)
2012–2014	Skövde AIK	65	(2)
- * Club domestic league appearances and goals as of 31 December 2014

Karl Gunnar David Lidholm (born 28 May 1982), formerly known as David Johansson, is a Swedish football defender who mainly played for Hammarby IF in Stockholm. He is currently playing for Skövde AIK.
