= George Mourad =

Syrian footballer

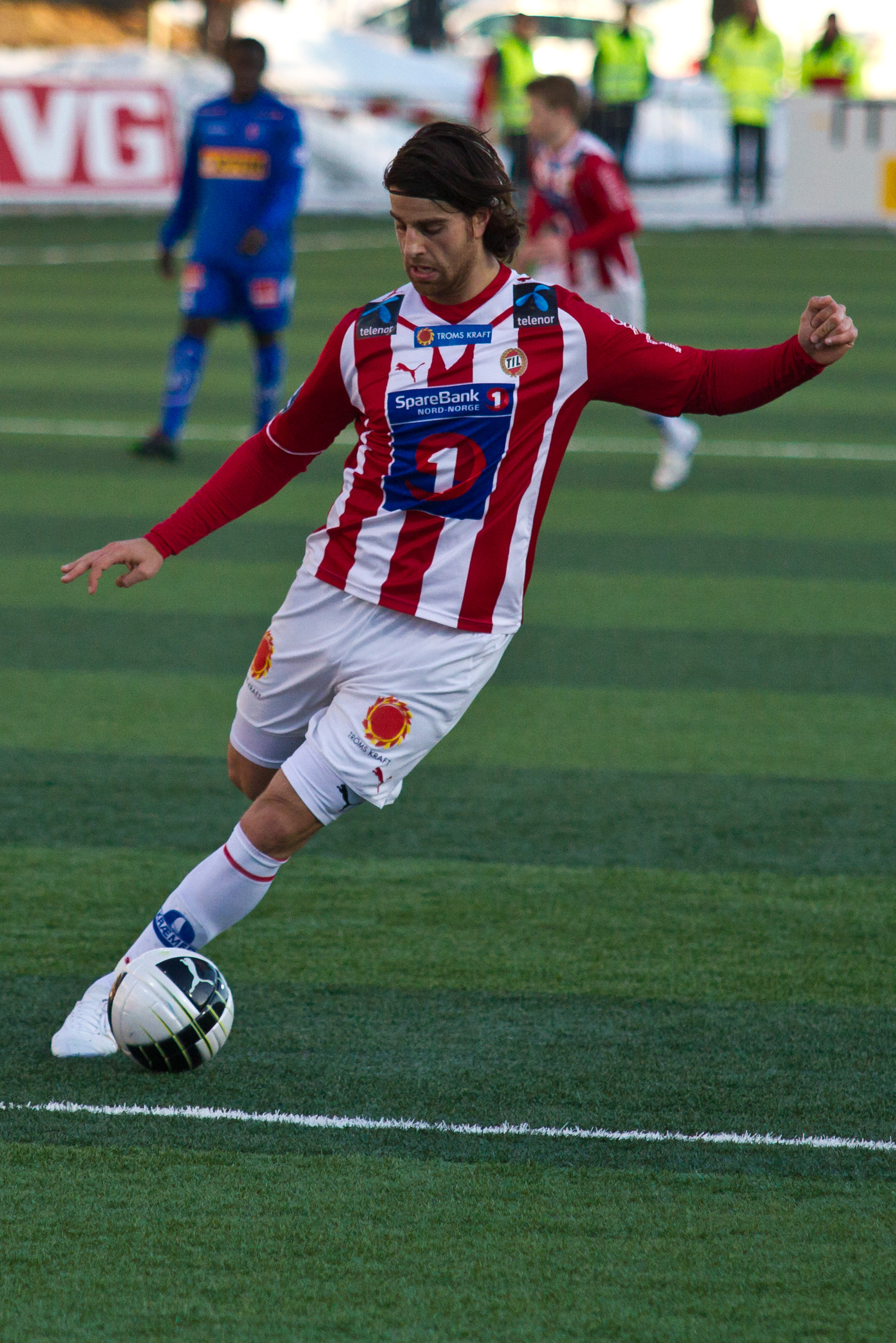
- Mourad with Tromsø in 2010

Personal information
- Date of birth: 18 September 1982 (age 44)
- Place of birth: Beirut, Lebanon
- Height: 1.89 m (6 ft 2 in)
- Position: Striker

Youth career
- Västra Frölunda

Senior career*
Years	Team	Apps	(Gls)
2000–2003	Västra Frölunda	58	(13)
2004–2008	IFK Göteborg	68	(14)
2006	→ Brescia (loan)	6	(2)
2008–2010	Willem II	36	(4)
2010	Tromsø	25	(8)
2011	Portimonense	5	(1)
2011–2012	Mes Kerman	9	(1)
2012	Syrianska	18	(2)
2013	Qingdao Jonoon	13	(0)
2013–2016	Örgryte IS	61	(17)
2017	Utsiktens BK	23	(1)
Total		321	(63)

International career
2005	Sweden	2	(0)
2011	Syria	5	(1)
- * Club domestic league appearances and goals

George Mourad (Arabic: جورج مراد; born 18 September 1982) is a former professional footballer who played as a striker. Born in Lebanon, he represented both Sweden and Syria internationally.

== Club career ==
After playing for Västra Frölunda IF, he joined IFK Göteborg in 2004 and scored seven goals in his debut season in Allsvenskan. In 2005, he had a disappointing season with only three goals in Allsvenskan. He then signed a six-month loan contract for Italian Serie B side Brescia on 31 January 2006. After a trial, Mourad was granted a contract on 11 January 2008 at the Dutch club Willem II. He has played for the Sweden men's national football team. As of 1 February 2010, Mourad left Willem II after dissolving his contract.

Mourad signed a one-year contract with Tromsø IL on 11 March 2010.

Mourad transferred to Chinese Super League side Qingdao Jonoon in February 2013.

== International career ==
Mourad was born in Lebanon, and is of Assyrian descent, but was raised in Sweden. He played for Swedish youth teams, and a friendly for the Sweden national team, before switching to the Syrian Arab Federation for Football.

He played his first official cap in the 2014 FIFA World Cup qualification tournament for Syria against Tajikistan on 23 July 2011, thereby eliminating the possibility of playing for Sweden ever again. His international debut for Syria was in a friendly against Iraq in Arbil on 29 June 2011.

In a controversial decision, FIFA disqualified Syria from the 2014 World Cup qualifiers for fielding Mourad, who previously represented Sweden in a U-21 UEFA qualifying tournament in 2003, without seeking the administrative approval of FIFA for the switch. Tajikistan replaced Syria in the 2014 World Cup qualifiers. The Syrian Arab Federation for Football president, Farouq Sarriyeh, announced he would petition CAS to overturn the FIFA ban.

== Career statistics ==
As of 17 July 2012

Appearances and goals by club, season and competition
Club	Season	League			National cup (Note: Includes Norwegian Cup, Taça de Portugal, Hazfi Cup, and Svenska Cupen)		Total	
Club	Season	Division	Apps	Goals	Apps	Goals	Apps	Goals
Tromsø	2010	Tippeligaen	25	8	2	0	27	8
Portimonense	2010–11	Primeira Liga	5	1	0	0	5	1
Mes Kerman	2011–12	Persian Gulf Cup	9	1	2	0	11	1
Syrianska	2012	Allsvenskan	18	2	1	1	19	3
Career total			57	12	5	1	62	13

=== International ===
Scores and results list Syria's goal tally first, score column indicates score after each Mourad goal.

List of international goals scored by George Mourad
No.	Date	Venue	Opponent	Score	Result	Competition	Ref.
1	23 July 2011	King Abdullah Stadium, Amman, Jordan	Tajikistan	2–1	2–1	FIFA World Cup 2014 Qualifying	
