= Enavallen =

Football stadium in Enköping, Sweden

Coordinates: 59°37′57″N 17°04′04″E

Enavallen is a football stadium in Enköping, Sweden and the home stadium for the football team Enköpings SK. Enavallen has a total capacity of 4,500 spectators. It was inaugurated on 8 July 1934.
