= Jonas Wallerstedt =

Swedish footballer (born 1978)

Personal information
- Full name: Anders Jonas Wallerstedt
- Date of birth: 18 March 1978 (age 48)
- Place of birth: Linköping, Sweden
- Height: 1.81 m (5 ft 11 in)
- Position: Striker

Youth career
- IK Östria Lambohov

Senior career*
Years	Team	Apps	(Gls)
1995–2002	IFK Norrköping	133	(31)
2003	FC Torpedo-Metallurg Moscow	2	(0)
2003–2005	GIF Sundsvall	42	(14)
2006–2008	IFK Göteborg	74	(17)
2009–2011	GIF Sundsvall	79	(15)
2012	Umeå FC	11	(0)
2012–2013	Hudiksvalls FF	10	(1)

International career
1998–1999	Sweden U21	12	(4)
1999–2000	Sweden	3	(0)

Managerial career
- 2012: Hudiksvalls FF (assistant)
- 2013–2014: GIF Sundsvall U-17
- * Club domestic league appearances and goals

Anders Jonas Wallerstedt (born 18 March 1978) is a Swedish former footballer who is a pilot for Braathens Regional Airlines, and the former manager of the GIF Sundsvall U-17 Tipselit team. He is known for his aerial and goal scoring abilities. He is nicknamed "Walle" by both fans and teammates. During his career he has represented three clubs in the Swedish top flight, Allsvenskan, and was a part of the IFK Göteborg team that won the 2007 Allsvenskan. He is the first Swedish footballer to have played in the Russian Premier League.

== Playing career ==
=== IFK Norrköping ===
After playing for two local clubs, he joined IFK Norrköping in 1995. He would become a reliable force at top for his team, scoring 31 goals in 123 appearances, and was capped for the Sweden national team several times in 1999 and 2000. He was also chosen as "Årets herrfotbollsspelare i Östergötland" (Male footballer of the year in Östergötland) 1999. IFK Norrköping was relegated to Superettan after the 2002 season and Wallerstedt decided to try his luck elsewhere attending trials with both Norwegian club Bryne FK and with the Russian club FC Torpedo-Metallurg Moscow. He eventually moved to the Russian club, signing a three-year deal in February 2003, thus becoming the first Swedish player to play in the Russian Premier League.

=== GIF Sundsvall ===
Wallerstedt returned to Allsvenskan 1 July 2003, after only 5 months in Russia. FIFA allowed the transfer to go through despite their 12-month rule because of FC Torpedo-Metallurg Moscow's administrative problems with both obtaining a visa for the player and paying his wages. This also meant that Wallerstedt transferred to his new team without a transfer fee as his three-year deal with the Russian club no longer was binding. Wallerstedt instantly became a starter and scored 4 goals in 15 starts during his first season, helping his club avoiding direct relegation by mere 2 points and winning the playoff game against BK Häcken on away goals.

The 2004 season was a success story for both Wallerstedt and his club. GIF Sundsvall finished at an impressive 7th place (passing Örebro SK after the season as they were awarded a game in retrospect) and Wallerstedt finished as the club's top scorer with his 9 goals in 25 starts.

The 2005 season came off to a terrible start as Wallerstedt injured his right knee in the first of the season against IF Elfsborg and missed almost the entire season, only able to make two more appearances for the team as a substitute. Despite that the team was involved in the relegation battle, the player extended his contract until the end of the 2008 season declaring that he would sign the contract if he didn't believe that the team would survive the relegation battle. The player would be proven wrong as the team had a hard time without their star and finished 13th (of 14) and was relegated to Superettan after six straight seasons in the top flight.

=== IFK Göteborg ===
==== 2006 season ====
Wallerstedt was purchased from GIF Sundsvall to Swedish giants IFK Göteborg for a reported sum of €50,000, along with his teammate and fellow striker Ali Gerba, to replace Peter Ijeh at the front. His debut in Allsvenskan came in the first game of the season when he replaced his former GIF Sundsvall teammate as a second half-substitute (as a part of an unusual triple substitution), in a disappointing 0–0 draw against newly promoted side Öster. His first start and first goal came 2 games later against Helsingborg. Early in the second half he received a sweeping cross from teammate Magnus Johansson that he sent in the net with a diving header. It was the last goal in the 2–2 match, the third straight draw in the team's disappointing start of the season. The rest of the season wasn't much better ending with ten starts and eleven matches coming in from the bench, scoring only 2 more goals, as the team ended the season in a disappointing eight place. The fans did, however, appreciate his attitude towards the game and for his fearless challenges in his aerial game.

==== 2007 season ====
The 2007 season was luckier for both Wallerstedt and IFK Göteborg as the team won Allsvenskan and finished as runners-up in Svenska Cupen. He was initially used as a substitute for Stefan Selakovic, who failed to make an impact and in the 10th game for the season Wallerstedt finally made it into the starting eleven. Faring much better than Selakovic and with the departure of fellow striker Marcus Berg to FC Groningen, he was regularly a starter in the latter half of the season, usually paired with Pontus Wernbloom at the top. The two strong and hard-working attackers proved to be a hard pair to defend against as IFK Göteborg finished the season with 14 straight games without a loss. He was also used as a winger several times during the season, a position he had problems with adapting to. Wallerstedt had at the end of the season played 25 matches (12 starts) and managed to score 7 goals in the league, perhaps the winning 3–2 goal late in the game against eventual runners-up Kalmar FF on 17 June the most important. The final in Svenska Cupen was however not as much fun for Wallerstedt, who played the entire game as Göteborg lost the title to Kalmar FF (3–0). After the season rumors began to circulate that Wallerstedt and his teammate Thomas Olsson were negotiating to make a comeback with their former team IFK Norrköping that had won promotion to Allsvenskan, but as the 2008 season approached neither of the players had transferred. Wallerstedt did however state that he was interested in returning to his former after his current contract had expired.

==== 2008 season ====
In his third season IFK Göteborg went into the season as one of the big favorites to win Allsvenskan and as the national champions would attempt to qualify to UEFA Champions League. The season came off to a flying start as IFK Göteborg won Supercupen with Wallerstedt as the big hero with two goals in the 3–1 win. The goal form continued to the league opener against Malmö FF where he found the net to secure a draw. The rest of the season was tougher for the striker as he had a hard time finding playing time as a striker, often placed on the bench and when on the pitch usually finding himself on the left midfield instead of as a striker. This was attributed to the rise of new star Robin Söder and to managers Stefan Rehn and Jonas Olsson preferring the speed injected by Tobias Hysén rather than Wallerstedt's strength. He did, however, participate in 28 games (17 starts), once again proving his competence in front of goal ending the season as club's top scorer in Allsvenskan with 7 goals and helped the team to earn the 3rd place. The team also won Svenska Cupen, managing to beat the league champions Kalmar FF in the final after a penalty shoot-out. During the fall of 2008 IFK Göteborg was also a part of the qualification for the UEFA Champions League and Wallerstedt played his first game in the tournament in the first qualification round against Sammarinese side S.S. Murata when he came in as a second-half substitute, replacing Robin Söder up front. His first (and so far only) goal came in the second game against Murata when he scored the third goal in the 4–0 home win (9–0 total). IFK Göteborg was eliminated in the second qualifying round without Wallerstedt playing a single minute. After the season, he was rumoured to be unsatisfied with the amount of playing time and was linked with several clubs, including local rivals Örgryte IS and former club GIF Sundsvall.

=== Return to GIF Sundsvall ===
On 24 February it was announced that Wallerstedt had signed for his former GIF Sundsvall, playing in the Swedish second division, Superettan. He scored already in his first game for the club, in a friendly against Umeå FC. Wallerstedt also scored the team's first competitive goal of the season as GIF Sundsvall won beat Falkenbergs FF 2–1. His second goal of the season came in week 6 as he secured a point for his team from the penalty spot in the 1–1 draw against Qviding FIF, a game in which he also was chosen as captain in Stefan Ålander's absence. He finished the season with nine goals as GIF Sundsvall finished 5th in Superettan, missing playoff by four points.

== International career ==
Jonas Wallerstedt made his international debut for the Sweden national team against South Africa in Pretoria on 27 November 1999 as he came in from the bench replacing Marcus Allbäck. The team consisted of players only from the Scandinavian leagues. He won another two international caps against Denmark and Norway in La Manga between 31 January and 4 February 2000, coming in as a late substitute. Again, the team consisted of players from the Scandinavian leagues. Notably, of the 3 games he participated in, the team lost 2 and made 1 draw scoring only one goal. He has yet to make his competitive debut and his first international goal, but it is unlikely that he will get a chance to win a fourth cap as he has not been up for discussion in several years.

== Career statistics ==
Appearances and goals by club, season and competition
Club	Season	League		Cup		Europe		Total	
Club	Season	Apps	Goals	Apps	Goals	Apps	Goals	Apps	Goals
IFK Norrköping	2001	20	3			-	-	20	3
IFK Norrköping	2002	25	6			-	-	25	6
Torpedo-Metallurg Moscow	2003	2	0	-	-	-	-	2	0
GIF Sundsvall	2003	15	4	-	-	-	-	15	4
GIF Sundsvall	2004	24	9	3	4	-	-	27	13
GIF Sundsvall	2005	3	1	0	0	-	-	3	1
IFK Göteborg	2006	21	3	2	0	1	0	24	3
IFK Göteborg	2007	25	7	4	1	-	-	29	8
IFK Göteborg	2008	28	7	3	0	2	1	33	8
GIF Sundsvall	2009	29	9	3	0	-	-	32	9
GIF Sundsvall	2010	27	4	2	0	-	-	29	4
GIF Sundsvall	2011	10	1	2	0	-	-	12	1
Total		229	54	19	5	3	1	251	60

== Honours ==
IFK Göteborg

- Allsvenskan: 2007
- Svenska Cupen: 2008
- Supercupen: 2008
