= Kim Christensen (footballer, born 1979) =

Danish footballer

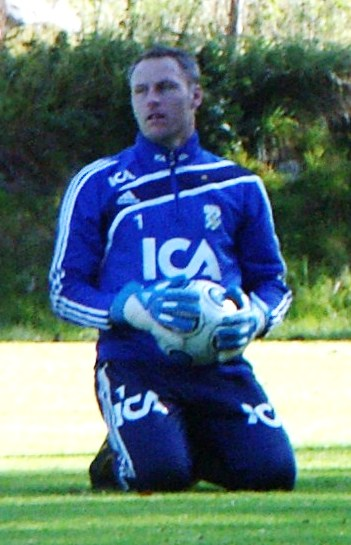
- Christensen with Göteborg in 2009

Personal information
- Full name: Kim Damgaard Christensen
- Date of birth: 16 July 1979 (age 47)
- Place of birth: Hvidovre, Denmark
- Height: 1.85 m (6 ft 1 in)
- Position: Goalkeeper

Youth career
- Rosenhøj BK

Senior career*
Years	Team	Apps	(Gls)
1997–2002	Rosenhøj BK	101	(0)
2002–2003	Hvidovre IF	27	(0)
2003–2004	NFA	30	(0)
2004–2008	FC Nordsjælland	117	(0)
2008–2010	IFK Göteborg	74	(0)
2010–2018	Copenhagen	14	(0)
Total		363	(0)

International career
2010	Denmark	1	(0)
- * Club domestic league appearances and goals

Kim Damgaard Christensen (born 16 July 1979) is a Danish retired professional footballer who played as a goalkeeper. He got his breakthrough with Danish club FC Nordsjælland in 2004, before moving to Swedish club IFK Göteborg, with whom he won the 2008 Swedish Cup. He joined F.C. Copenhagen in June 2010. He played one game for the Denmark national team.

== Club career ==
Born in Hvidovre, Christensen started playing football with amateur team Rosenhøj, and represented the team for 101 games. He joined Danish 1st Division team Hvidovre IF in 2002, and played one season with the club as it was relegated during the 2002–03 season. He moved to newly promoted 1st Division team Nykøbing Falster Alliancen, and helped the team finish eighth in the 2003–04 season.

=== FC Nordsjælland ===
Christensen joined Danish Superliga club FC Nordsjælland in 2004, competing with Japanese international Yoshi Kawaguchi for the starting position. While Kawaguchi was away to play for the Japan national team during the pre-season, Christensen established himself as the starting goalkeeper. He played all 33 league games as Nordsjælland finished in 10th place in the 2004–05 season, and also saw off the competition from backup keeper Jan Budtz.

He also played all games of the following 2004–05 season, as the team finished ninth. When Tommy Olsen rescinded his place as team captain in May 2006, Christensen was chosen the next captain of Nordsjælland. In an April 2007 game against F.C. Copenhagen, Christensen made an uncharacteristic mistake as Nordsjælland lost 1–0, when he mistimed a kick of the ball, leaving it rolling into the empty net. He still played all Nordsjælland games of the 2006–07 season, helping the club finish fifth. In November 2007, Christensen expressed the wish to move abroad, in order to be in contention for a place in the Danish national team. He looked to leave the club during the winter transfer window, after a total 117 league games in a row for FC Nordsjælland.

=== IFK Göteborg ===
Christensen transferred to IFK Göteborg on 13 March 2008, as a replacement for club legend Bengt Andersson, who had retired after the previous season. He made his debut on 22 March in the Swedish Super Cup final against Kalmar FF. IFK Göteborg won 3–1 to secure the 2008 Swedish Super Cup trophy. Christensen kept the number 1 spot for the entire 2008 season, playing every single minute in the league and was widely praised for his performances. Towards the end of the season, Christensen kept his opponents from scoring in six straight games, among others in the away game against the eventual champions Kalmar FF.

On 21 September 2008, Christensen won his second title with the club when Kalmar FF were defeated in the 2008 Swedish Cup final on penalty shootout, after drawing the game 0–0. Christensen himself was hailed as a hero, making several impressive saves during the game and also scoring in the penalty shootout.

In a match on 23 September 2009 against Örebro it was discovered that, prior to the match start, Christensen lifted and moved both goal posts inwards, thus making his goal smaller. 20 minutes into the game, the referee was notified of the infraction and corrected the positions of the goal posts. When interviewed after the game, Christensen said he had done so before on many occasions and perhaps that was the reason he was able to keep goals out.

=== F.C. Copenhagen ===
In June 2010, he moved back to Denmark, as he signed a three-and-a-half-year contract with defending Superliga champions F.C. Copenhagen.

In Copenhagen his role initial became as reserve for the first choice Johan Wiland, with Christensen only getting playtime against minor teams and at injuries. His first start for the Danish champions came on 1 May 2011, where he held a clean sheet against SønderjyskE in a 3–0 win.

During the autumn 2012, Johan Wiland was kept out in two longer periods with injuries, whereas Christensen played 16 full matches, including four games in the UEFA Europa League group stage.

From the beginning of the 2013–14 season, Christensen was overtaken by Jakob Busk as reserve keeper, which has left Christensen disappointed and prepared to leave Copenhagen at the end of his contract at New Year.

Kim Christensen joined the goalkeeper coaching team in FC Copenhagen in 2018

== International career ==
Christensen made his first international appearance, when he joined the Denmark League XI national football team for unofficial games at the 2009 King's Cup in January 2009. He made his debut in the final of the tournament, as the League XI team beat Thailand on penalty shoot-out on 23 January. He was also a part of the squad during the 2010 King's Cup of January 2010, playing two games as the League XI retained their title.

After joining IFK, Christensen was called up for the Danish national team in September 2008, to replace the injured Thomas Sørensen and Jesper Christiansen, but did not play. He was once more a part of the squad in August 2009, replacing Jesper Christiansen, but established himself as third choice keeper in September 2009. He was included in the Danish preliminary squad for the 2010 World Cup in South Africa. He made his national team debut on 27 May 2010, but was cut from the final 23-man squad in favour of Jesper Christiansen.

== Honours ==
IFK Göteborg

- Swedish Super Cup: 2008
- Swedish Cup: 2008

Copenhagen

- Danish Superliga: 2010–11, 2012–13, 2015–16, 2016–17
- Danish Cup: 2011–12, 2014–15, 2015–16, 2016–17
