= Hjálmar Jónsson (footballer) =

Icelandic footballer

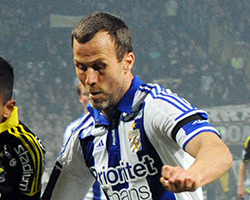

Personal information
- Full name: Hjálmar Jónsson
- Date of birth: 29 July 1980 (age 46)
- Place of birth: Egilsstaðir, Iceland
- Height: 1.82 m (6 ft 0 in)
- Positions: Centre back; left back

Youth career
- –1994: Höttur

Senior career*
Years	Team	Apps	(Gls)
1994–1998	Höttur		
1999–2001	Keflavík	32	(1)
2002–2016	IFK Göteborg	254	(7)
Total		286	(8)

International career
2001	Iceland U21	3	(0)
2002–2013	Iceland	21	(0)

Managerial career
- 2017–2023: IFK Göteborg (U19)
- * Club domestic league appearances and goals

Hjálmar Jónsson (born 29 July 1980) is an Icelandic former footballer who played as a defender. During most of his career, he played for IFK Göteborg in Allsvenskan.

== Club career ==
After playing for Icelandic clubs Höttur and Keflavik, he joined Swedish club IFK Göteborg in 2002, a club he has played for since then. On 16 July 2006, he scored his first ever goal for IFK Göteborg against Halmstads BK in a league game.

== International career ==
Jónsson made his debut for Iceland in a January 2002 friendly match against Kuwait.

== Career statistics ==
=== Club ===
Club	Season	League		Cup		Continental		Total	
Club	Season	Apps	Goals	Apps	Goals	Apps	Goals	Apps	Goals
Keflavík	2000	14	1	0	0	—		14	1
Keflavík	2001	18	0	3	1	—		21	1
Keflavík	Total	32	1	3	1	0	0	35	2
IFK Göteborg	2002	10	0	0	0	1	0	11	0
IFK Göteborg	2003	17	0	3	0	—		20	0
IFK Göteborg	2004	21	0	5	0	—		26	0
IFK Göteborg	2005	8	0	0	0	0	0	8	0
IFK Göteborg	2006	12	1	0	0	2	0	14	1
IFK Göteborg	2007	23	1	6	1	—		29	2
IFK Göteborg	2008	25	0	6	1	4	1	35	2
IFK Göteborg	2009	25	1	4	0	2	0	31	1
IFK Göteborg	2010	25	2	1	0	2	0	28	2
IFK Göteborg	2011	21	0	3	0	—		24	0
IFK Göteborg	2012	17	1	0	0	—		17	1
IFK Göteborg	2013	15	0	2	0	2	0	19	0
IFK Göteborg	2014	9	0	2	0	5	0	16	0
IFK Göteborg	2015	19	0	4	0	1	0	24	0
IFK Göteborg	2016	7	1	1	0	2	0	10	1
IFK Göteborg	Total	254	7	37	2	21	1	312	10
Career total		286	8	40	3	21	1	347	12

=== International ===
National team	Year	Apps	Goals
Iceland	2002	5	0
Iceland	2003	1	0
Iceland	2004	3	0
Iceland	2006	4	0
Iceland	2007	3	0
Iceland	2008	2	0
Iceland	2009	0	0
Iceland	2010	0	0
Iceland	2011	0	0
Iceland	2012	2	0
Iceland	2013	1	0
Total		21	0

== Honours ==
IFK Göteborg

- Allsvenskan: 2007
- Svenska Cupen: 2008, 2012–13, 2014–15
- Svenska Supercupen: 2008

Individual

- Årets Ärkeängel: 2007
