= Jonatan Berg =

Swedish footballer

Personal information
- Full name: Anders Kenneth Jonatan Berg
- Date of birth: 9 May 1985 (age 41)
- Place of birth: Torsby, Sweden
- Height: 1.79 m (5 ft 10 in)
- Position: Midfielder

Youth career
- IFK Velen
- Torsby IF
- 2002–2004: IFK Göteborg

Senior career*
Years	Team	Apps	(Gls)
2005–2008	IFK Göteborg	26	(3)
2006	→ GAIS (loan)	15	(1)
2007	→ Trelleborgs FF (loan)	11	(1)
2009–2010	Gefle IF	31	(3)
2010–2011	Taranto	0	(0)
2012	Varbergs BoIS	27	(2)
2013–2015	IK Sirius	40	(8)
Total		150	(18)
- * Club domestic league appearances and goals

Anders Kenneth Jonatan Berg (born 9 May 1985) is a Swedish former professional footballer who played as midfielder. His natural position was on the central midfield, but he also worked well as a right winger.

== Career ==
After playing for his local club and Torsby IF, he joined IFK Göteborg in 2002. After a couple of years his younger brother Marcus Berg (now being a player for the national team of Sweden) also joined IFK Göteborg. Jonatan wasn't a pick for the starting line up and therefore he went to loan in 2006 to the Gothenburg rival of GAIS where he played as a starter. In 2007, he went on loan to Trelleborgs FF in 2007. In 2008, he stayed at IFK Göteborg but played only 9 games, of which 7 was as a starter. In 2009, he moved on to Gefle IF. There, he became an important player with great teamwork and being good on set pieces. In July 2010, after having a trial he moved on to Italy and Serie C1, joining Taranto which w aiming to reach Serie B.
