= Lasse Johansson (footballer) =

Swedish footballer (born 1975)

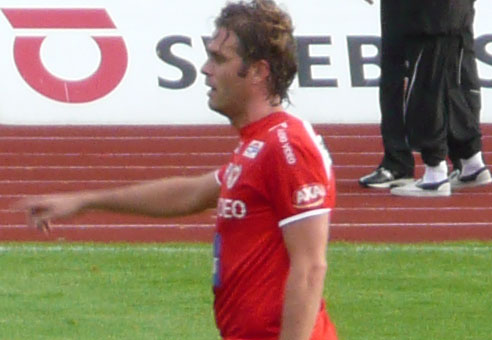

Personal information
- Date of birth: 2 April 1975 (age 51)
- Place of birth: Emmaboda, Sweden
- Height: 1.82 m (5 ft 11 1/2 in)
- Position: Central midfielder

Team information
- Current team: Emmaboda
- Number: 21

Senior career*
| Years | Team | Apps | (Gls) |
| 1999–2000 | Virestads IF | ? | (?) |
| 2000 | Östers IF | ? | (?) |
| 2001–2009 | Kalmar FF | 209 | (30) |
| 2010– | Emmaboda IS | 2 | (0) |
- * Club domestic league appearances and goals as of 6 May 2010 ‡ National team caps and goals as of 4 May 2010

Lasse Johansson (born 2 April 1975) is a Swedish footballer, currently playing for Emmaboda IS. He played for Kalmar FF from 2001 to 2009.

In 2006, Johansson was elected to the municipal council of Kalmar Municipality.
