= Fredriksskans =

Sports venue in Kalmar, Sweden

Coordinates: 56°40′7″N 16°21′39″E

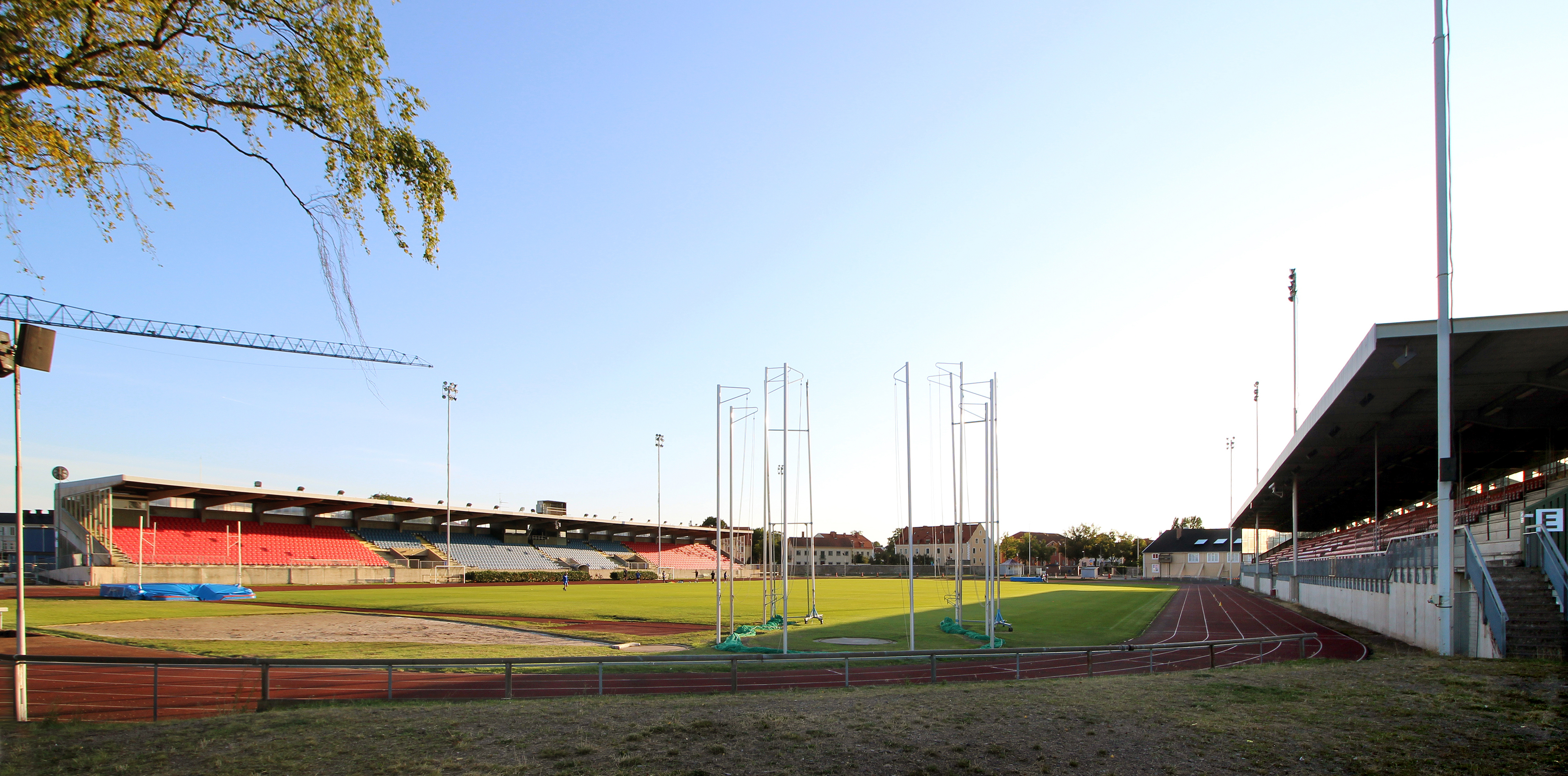
- Fredriksskans in August 2021
- Interactive map of Fredriksskans
- Location: Kalmar, Sweden
- Type: outdoor stadium

Tenants
- Kalmar SK, Kalmar AIK

Fredriksskans is a multi-purpose stadium in Kalmar, Sweden. It served as the home ground for Kalmar FF until it was replaced by Guldfågeln Arena in 2011. It is used for football matches and athletics. The stadium holds 9,000 people and was built in 1919.
