= Eldin Karišik =

Bosnian-born Swedish footballer (born 1983)

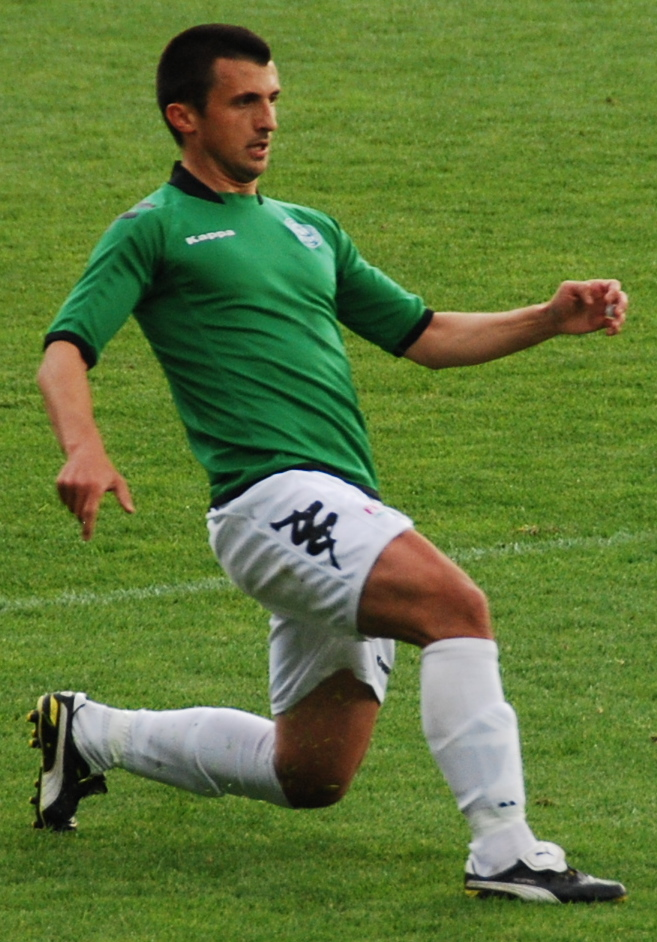

Personal information
- Date of birth: 18 March 1983 (age 43)
- Place of birth: SR Bosnia and Herzegovina, SFR Yugoslavia
- Height: 1.76 m (5 ft 9 1/2 in)
- Position: Midfielder

Youth career
- IFK Dannemora/Österby
- Ludvika FK
- 1995–2000: Helsingborgs IF

Senior career*
Years	Team	Apps	(Gls)
2001–2007	Helsingborgs IF	68	(7)
2007–2008	IFK Göteborg	24	(1)
2008–2011	Viborg FF	80	(9)
2011	Varbergs BoIS	1	(0)
2012–2013	Kristianstads FF	32	(9)

International career
2001	Sweden U18	3	(0)
2001	Sweden U19	1	(0)
2003–2005	Sweden U21	7	(0)
- * Club domestic league appearances and goals as of 25 November 2013

Eldin Karišik (born 18 March 1983) is a retired Bosnian-Swedish footballer.

He last played for Kristianstads FF as a midfielder.
