= César Santin =

Brazilian footballer (born 1981)

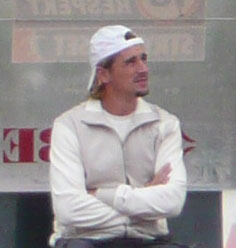

Personal information
- Full name: César Santin
- Date of birth: 24 February 1981 (age 45)
- Place of birth: Jacutinga, Brazil
- Height: 1.74 m (5 ft 9 in)
- Position: Forward

Team information
- Current team: Hillerød Fodbold (youth coach)

Senior career*
Years	Team	Apps	(Gls)
2001	São José		
2002	Grêmio	10	(1)
2003	Vitória	3	(0)
2004	São José	24	(4)
2004–2008	Kalmar FF	105	(31)
2008–2013	Copenhagen	161	(65)
2014	APOEL	20	(6)
2014	Kalmar FF	11	(0)
2016	Aimoré	3	(1)
2019	Fremad Valby		

Managerial career
- 2020–: Hillerød Fodbold (youth)
- * Club domestic league appearances and goals

César Santin (Brazilian Portuguese: [ˈsɛzɐʁ sɐ̃ˈtʃĩ]; born 24 February 1981) is a Brazilian former professional footballer who played as a forward. He is currently working as an academy coach at Hillerød Fodbold.

He is a versatile player, being able to play most of the attacking positions in both midfield and attack. He is known for his ability to challenge opponents using dribbling techniques.

== Biography ==
=== Early career ===
In his years in Brazil he started his career playing for São José, a team he would later return to play for a short brief in 2004. Meanwhile, he played for both Grêmio and Vitória, never managing to get his breakthrough in the best Brazilian league Campeonato Brasileiro Série A. His goal for Grêmio against Juventude gave qualification for semifinals in 2002 Brasileirão.

=== Kalmar FF ===
In 2004, he transferred from São José to Swedish club Kalmar FF who the previous season was promoted from Superettan finishing 1st, and was about to play in Allsvenskan.

César Santin quickly became a darling to the fans due to his hard work and good dribbles. He especially won the supporters hearts when he scored against Scandinavian giants F.C. Copenhagen, which he would later transfer to, with a terrific longshot leaving Copenhagen's goalie Jesper Christiansen no chance in a Royal League match, a match Kalmar FF won 1–0.

In his time in Allsvenskan, he developed into a league profile scoring 12 times in 23 appearances in the 2007 season. In the first half of the 2008 season he started out as the league topscorer helping Kalmar FF to the 1st place in the league. His strong performances had him linked with F.C. Copenhagen to whom he would later transfer to for an unknown price, however, Ekstra Bladet claimed that the price was around 10 million Danish kroner.

=== F.C. Copenhagen ===
In the 2008 Danish summer transfer window, F.C. Copenhagen chairman Flemming Østergaard promised that the club would get the best squad in the league, but as the window headed towards the end F.C. Copenhagen still had not signed any reinforcement but Thomas Kristensen from FC Nordsjælland. As César Santin was signed at the end of the window, many people became sceptic and thought of him as being a panicky transfer, however, after some good performances and a goal in his fourth game for the club against Lillestrøm SK and fifth game against league rivals FC Midtjylland he quickly became a fan favourite, and is now considered one of the most essential parts of the Copenhagen offensive play.

On 6 November 2008, César Santin scored his second goal in the 2008–09 UEFA Cup group stage when he from close range equalized Valencia CF's 1–0 lead and the match ended in a draw. He claimed after the match that he had scored many important goals, but the one against Valencia CF was the most important goal in his career.

On 17 December 2008, F.C. Copenhagen played their last match of the year against Belgian side Club Brugge. Copenhagen won 1–0, the goalscorer was Santin, and this secured Copenhagen to play at the knock-out stages of the 2008–09 UEFA Cup, facing English side Manchester City. A game that was drawn 2–2 after goals from Aílton Almeida and Martin Vingaard.

On 24 May 2009, Santin secured F.C. Copenhagen the championship of the 2009 season, scoring on a penalty shot against Esbjerg fB, the sole goal of the game. Meanwhile, Brøndby lost their game in Aarhus, giving Copenhagen a 5-point lead with one round left in the Superliga.

The 2010–11 season was so far the most successful for Santin, as he was part of the historical side, that managed to progress from the group stage of the UEFA Champions League, before being knocked out by Chelsea F.C. 2–0 on aggregate. Also, he managed to net an impressive 17 goals in the domestic league that season, becoming the second-most scoring player in the league after teammate Dame N'Doye, who scored a total of 25. Santin was a regular starter all season in the Superliga, where F.C. Copenhagen performed very well and won with the highest margin ever.

In the 2011–12 season, he appeared in 44 matches and scored 17 goals in all competitions. This time his team F.C. Copenhagen failed to win the Superliga as they finished second behind FC Nordsjælland, but they managed to win the Danish Cup after beating Horsens 1–0 in the final. Santin scored his only goal in the European competitions that season against Hannover 96 at AWD-Arena, in Copenhagen's 2–2 draw for the group stage of the UEFA Europa League.

The next season, Santin appeared in 32 league matches and scored 11 goals, helping F.C. Copenhagen to win the Superliga again. He also scored against Club Brugge, in his side 3–2 away win for the third qualifying round of the Champions League and against Lille OSC, in Copenhagen's 1–0 home victory for the play-off round of the Champions League. After being eliminated in the play-off round of the UEFA Champions League, Copenhagen participated in the group stage of the UEFA Europa League, where Santin scored one goal against Molde FK at Aker Stadion, in a match which Copenhagen won by 2–1.

The 2013–14 season, was Santin's sixth and final season at F.C. Copenhagen. He managed to appear in 14 matches and scored 5 goals in all competitions, before he move to Cyprus and sign a contract with APOEL in December 2013.

=== APOEL ===
On 27 December 2013, César Santin signed an 18-month contract with APOEL FC from Cyprus. He made his debut on 4 January 2014, coming on as a 67th-minute substitute in APOEL's 2–2 home draw against AEL Limassol for the Cypriot First Division. He scored his first official goal for APOEL on 19 January 2014, in his team's 3–1 home win against Nea Salamina for the Cypriot First Division. He won his first title with APOEL on 21 May 2014, when his team won Ermis Aradippou 2–0 in the Cypriot Cup final and lifted the trophy. Ten days later, Santin also won the Cypriot First Division after APOEL's 1–0 away victory against AEL Limassol in the title deciding match of the competition. On 30 June 2014, APOEL terminated Santin's contract with the club by mutual consent.

== Career statistics ==
As of 1 November 2014

Club	Season	League			Cup		Other (Note: Includes Swedish Super Cup matches.)		Continental		Total	
Club	Season	Division	Apps	Goals	Apps	Goals	Apps	Goals	Apps	Goals	Apps	Goals
Kalmar FF	2004	Allsvenskan	21	3	0	0	–	–	–	–	21	3
Kalmar FF	2005	Allsvenskan	22	4	1	1	–	–	–	–	23	5
Kalmar FF	2006	Allsvenskan	24	3	4	5	–	–	–	–	28	8
Kalmar FF	2007	Allsvenskan	23	12	6	5	–	–	–	–	29	17
Kalmar FF	2008	Allsvenskan	15	9	1	1	1	1	–	–	17	11
Copenhagen	2008–09	Danish Superliga	32	11	2	0	–	–	9	5	43	16
Copenhagen	2009–10	Danish Superliga	27	11	1	0	–	–	10	2	38	13
Copenhagen	2010–11	Danish Superliga	27	17	0	0	–	–	9	1	36	18
Copenhagen	2011–12	Danish Superliga	31	13	4	3	–	–	9	1	44	17
Copenhagen	2012–13	Danish Superliga	32	11	3	1	–	–	10	3	45	15
Copenhagen	2013–14	Danish Superliga	12	2	2	3	–	–	0	0	14	5
Copenhagen	Total		161	65	12	7	–	–	47	12	220	84
APOEL	2013–14	Cypriot First Division	20	6	4	1	–	–	–	–	24	7
APOEL	Total		20	6	4	1	–	–	–	–	24	7
Kalmar FF	2014	Allsvenskan	11	0	1	0	–	–	–	–	12	0
Kalmar FF	Total		116	31	13	12	1	1	–	–	130	44
Career Total			297	102	29	20	1	1	47	12	374	135

== Honours ==
Kalmar FF

- Allsvenskan: 2008
- Svenska Cupen: 2007

F.C. Copenhagen

- Danish Superliga: 2008–09, 2009–10, 2010–11, 2012–13
- Danish Cup: 2008–09, 2011–12

APOEL

- Cypriot First Division: 2013–14
- Cypriot Cup: 2013–14
