= Stefan Selaković =

Swedish footballer

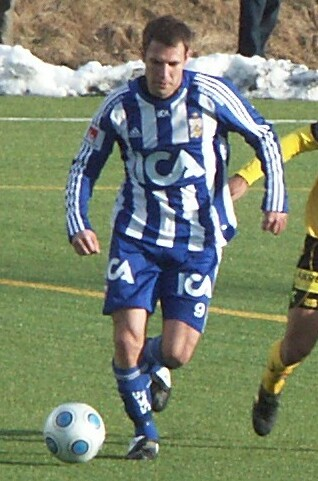
- Selaković with IFK Göteborg in 2009

Personal information
- Full name: Stevan Selaković
- Date of birth: 9 January 1977 (age 49)
- Place of birth: Varberg, Sweden
- Height: 1.79 m (5 ft 10 in)
- Positions: Midfielder; forward

Youth career
- –1994: Varberg

Senior career*
Years	Team	Apps	(Gls)
1993–1995	Varberg	66	(21)
1996–2001	Halmstad	119	(37)
2001–2004	Heerenveen	90	(19)
2005–2012	IFK Göteborg	201	(41)
2013	Halmstad	28	(4)
Total		504	(122)

International career
1996–1999	Sweden U21	13	(2)
2001–2006	Sweden	12	(4)
- * Club domestic league appearances and goals

Stevan "Stefan" Selaković (born 9 January 1977) is a Swedish former professional footballer who played as a midfielder and forward. He used to play as forward, but after 2006 was primarily used as a rightwing midfielder by IFK Göteborg. He previously played for Heerenveen, Halmstad and Varberg. He is a former Swedish international for which he played in 12 games and scored 4 goals.

== Career ==
He was born in Varberg, with roots from Serbia. After playing for Varberg, he joined Halmstad and won Allsvenskan in 2000 and was the top scorer in Allsvenskan in 2001. He then joined Dutch club Heerenveen. He was not able to continue to play as well as he had done in Sweden, and in 2005 he decided to move back to Sweden. Instead of his earlier club Halmstad, he chose to play for IFK Göteborg and signed a contract in 2005.

On 23 January 2013, Halmstad reported that Selaković had returned to the club.

== Career statistics ==
=== International ===
Scores and results list Sweden's goal tally first, score column indicates score after each Selaković goal.

List of international goals scored by Stefan Selaković
No.	Date	Venue	Opponent	Score	Result	Competition
1	10 February 2001	National Stadium, Bangkok, Thailand	Thailand	1–0	4–1	2001 King's Cup
2	17 February 2001	National Stadium, Bangkok, Thailand	China	3–0	3–0	2001 King's Cup
3	13 February 2002	Kleanthis Vikelidis Stadium, Thessaloniki, Greece	Greece	2–1	2–2	Friendly
4	18 February 2004	Qemal Stafa Stadium, Tirana, Albania	Albania	1–0	1–2	Friendly

== Honours ==
Individual

- Årets Ärkeängel: 2008
