= 2007 Allsvenskan =

83rd season of Allsvenskan

Allsvenskan
- Season: 2007
- Champions: IFK Göteborg; 18th Swedish championship title
- Relegated: IF Brommapojkarna
- Champions League: IFK Göteborg
- UEFA Cup: Kalmar FF; Djurgårdens IF
- Intertoto Cup: IF Elfsborg
- Matches: 182
- Goals: 466 (2.56 per match)
- Top goalscorer: Razak Omotoyossi, Marcus Berg (14)
- Biggest home win: Helsingborgs IF 9–0 Halmstads BK (28 October 2007)
- Biggest away win: Kalmar FF 0–5 IFK Göteborg (11 August 2007)
- Highest scoring: Helsingborgs IF 9–0 Halmstads BK (28 October 2007)
- Highest attendance: 41,471; IFK Göteborg 2–0 Trelleborgs FF (28 October 2007)
- Lowest attendance: 2,134; Trelleborgs FF 1–2 IF Elfsborg (17 May 2007)
- Average attendance: 10,258

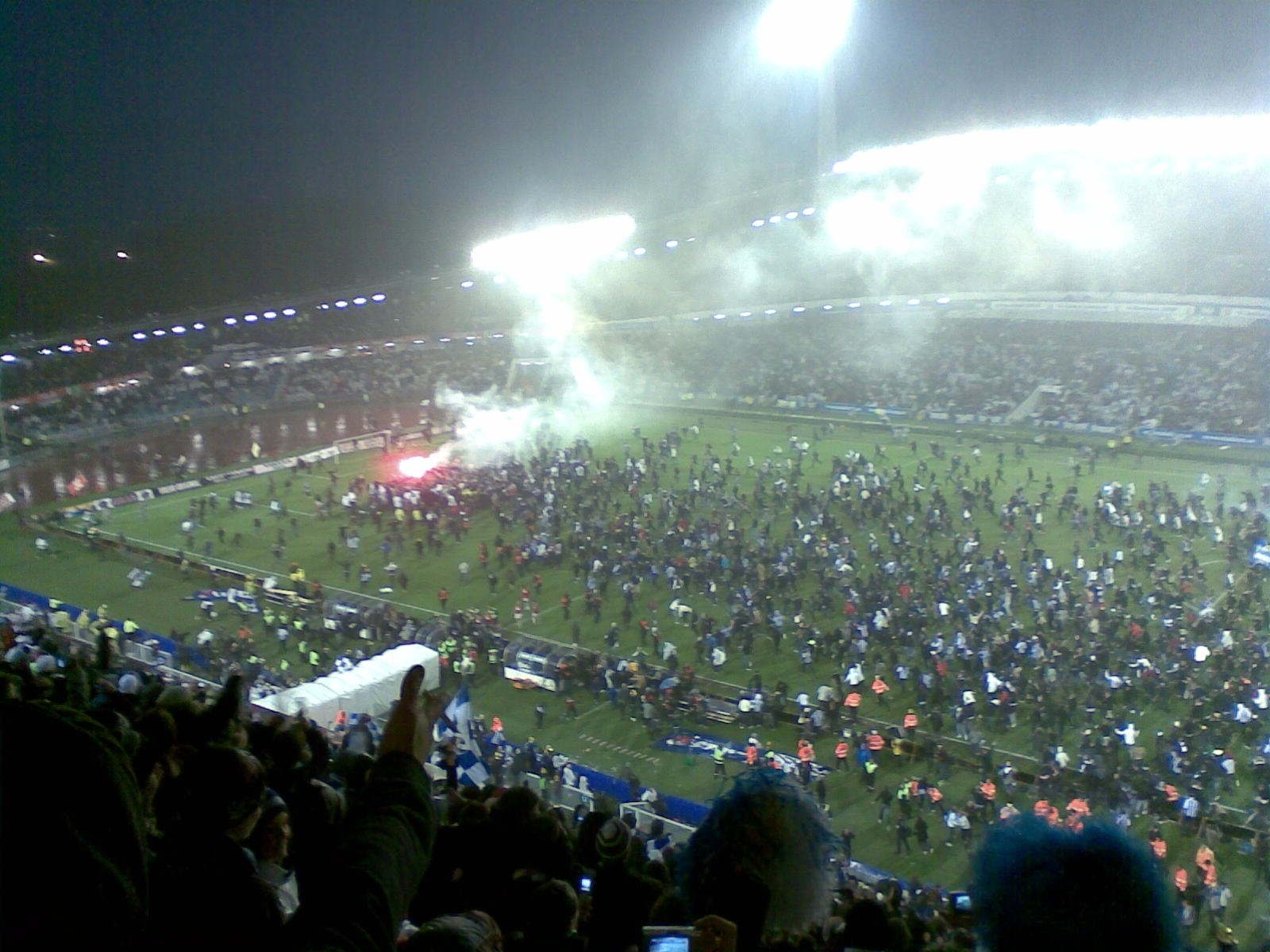
Celebration of the IFK Göteborg victory at Ullevi.

Allsvenskan 2007, part of the 2007 Swedish football season, was the 83rd Allsvenskan season played. The first match was played 6 April 2007 and the last match was played 28 October 2007. IFK Göteborg won the league ahead of runners-up Kalmar FF, while IF Brommapojkarna were relegated.

== Participating clubs ==
Locations of the 2007 Allsvenskan teams

Club	Last season	First season in league	First season of current spell
AIK	2nd	1924–25	2006
IF Brommapojkarna	3rd (Superettan)	2007	2007
Djurgårdens IF	6th	1927–28	2001
IF Elfsborg	1st	1926–27	1997
GAIS	10th	1924–25	2006
Gefle IF	9th	1933–34	2005
IFK Göteborg	8th	1924–25	1977
Halmstads BK	11th	1933–34	1993
Hammarby IF	3rd	1924–25	1998
Helsingborgs IF	4th	1924–25	1993
Kalmar FF	5th	1949–50	2004
Malmö FF	7th	1931–32	2001
Trelleborgs FF	1st (Superettan)	1985	2007
Örebro SK	2nd (Superettan)	1946–47	2007

== League table ==
Pos	Team	Pld	W	D	L	GF	GA	GD	Pts	Qualification or relegation
1	IFK Göteborg (C)	26	14	7	5	45	23	+22	49	Qualification to Champions League first qualifying round
2	Kalmar FF	26	15	3	8	43	32	+11	48	Qualification to UEFA Cup first qualifying round
3	Djurgårdens IF	26	13	7	6	39	24	+15	46	Qualification to UEFA Cup first qualifying round
4	IF Elfsborg	26	10	10	6	39	30	+9	40	Qualification to Intertoto Cup first round
5	AIK	26	10	8	8	30	27	+3	38	
6	Hammarby IF	26	11	3	12	35	31	+4	36	
7	Halmstads BK	26	9	9	8	33	41	−8	36	
8	Helsingborgs IF	26	9	8	9	49	37	+12	35	
9	Malmö FF	26	9	7	10	29	28	+1	34	
10	Gefle IF	26	9	7	10	29	30	−1	34	
11	GAIS	26	7	8	11	24	37	−13	29	
12	Örebro SK	26	6	7	13	28	45	−17	25	
13	Trelleborgs FF	26	5	8	13	22	38	−16	23	
14	IF Brommapojkarna (R)	26	5	8	13	21	43	−22	23	Relegation to Superettan

Source: svenskfotboll.se (in Swedish)
Rules for classification: 1) points; 2) goal difference; 3) number of goals scored.
(C) Champions; (R) Relegated

== Results ==
Home \ Away	AIK	BP	DIF	IFE	GAI	GIF	IFKG	HBK	HAM	HEL	KFF	MFF	TFF	ÖSK
AIK		3–0	1–1	0–1	0–0	1–0	0–1	1–1	1–0	0–1	0–1	3–1	2–0	1–1
IF Brommapojkarna	0–2		1–0	1–1	1–0	2–1	1–2	1–1	0–2	1–1	1–2	0–1	0–3	3–1
Djurgårdens IF	3–1	0–1		2–1	0–1	2–1	2–1	2–0	1–0	3–1	1–3	1–0	1–1	4–1
IF Elfsborg	2–0	3–0	2–2		5–1	1–1	3–1	1–1	1–2	0–0	2–2	1–1	2–0	0–2
GAIS	1–1	2–1	1–1	2–1		1–0	0–1	2–1	1–1	0–3	0–3	1–2	3–1	1–1
Gefle IF	0–0	1–1	0–2	2–2	1–0		0–2	2–0	1–0	4–0	2–1	2–1	1–0	0–0
IFK Göteborg	1–2	0–0	1–1	2–2	1–0	2–0		1–1	3–0	0–0	3–2	1–2	2–0	2–0
Halmstads BK	2–2	1–0	1–2	3–0	2–2	0–0	1–3		2–2	2–1	2–1	1–3	1–0	3–1
Hammarby IF	1–2	4–0	2–0	0–1	4–0	4–3	3–1	0–1		0–2	1–0	1–0	3–0	1–0
Helsingborgs IF	2–3	1–1	1–4	0–1	1–1	3–1	2–2	9–0	4–2		5–0	0–1	1–1	4–1
Kalmar FF	2–0	2–2	1–0	2–1	2–2	0–1	0–5	3–0	2–0	2–0		2–0	0–1	2–0
Malmö FF	4–0	2–0	1–1	1–2	1–0	1–1	0–2	1–2	1–1	1–1	1–2		0–0	1–0
Trelleborgs FF	0–0	3–3	0–3	1–2	0–1	3–2	1–1	1–1	1–0	2–3	1–3	2–1		0–0
Örebro SK	1–4	4–0	0–0	1–1	2–1	1–2	0–4	0–3	3–1	4–3	1–3	1–1	2–0	

Source: Swedish Football Association (in Swedish)
Legend: Blue = home team win; Yellow = draw; Red = away team win.

== Season statistics ==
=== Top scorers ===
Rank	Player	Club	Goals
1	(Sweden) Marcus Berg	IFK Göteborg	14
1	(Benin) Razak Omotoyossi	Helsingborgs IF	14
3	(Brazil) César Santin	Kalmar FF	12
4	(Sweden) Johan Oremo	Gefle IF	11
5	(Sweden) Anders Svensson	IF Elfsborg	9
5	(Brazil) Paulinho Guará	Hammarby IF	9
5	(Sweden) Henrik Larsson	Helsingborgs IF	9
5	(Brazil) Júnior	Malmö FF	9
9	(Brazil) Thiago Quirino	Djurgårdens IF	8
9	(Uruguay) Sebastián Eguren	Hammarby IF	8
9	(Sweden) Stefan Ishizaki	IF Elfsborg	8

=== Scoring ===
- Biggest Win (9 goals) – Helsingborgs IF 9–0 Halmstads BK
- Highest Scoring Match (9 goals) – Helsingborgs IF 9–0 Halmstads BK

=== Overall ===
- Most Wins – Kalmar FF (15)
- Fewest Wins – Trelleborgs FF and IF Brommapojkarna (5)
- Most Losses – Örebro SK, Trelleborgs FF and IF Brommapojkarna (13)
- Fewest Losses – IFK Göteborg (5)
- Most Goals Scored – Helsingborgs IF (49)
- Fewest Goals Scored – IF Brommapojkarna (21)
- Most Goals Conceded – Örebro SK (45)
- Fewest Goals Conceded – IFK Göteborg (23)

=== Home ===
- Most Wins – Djurgårdens IF and Hammarby IF (9)
- Fewest Wins – Trelleborgs FF (3)
- Most Losses – IF Brommapojkarna (6)
- Fewest Losses – IFK Göteborg, IF Elfsborg and Gefle IF (2)
- Most Goals Scored – Helsingborgs IF (33)
- Fewest Goals Scored – IF Brommapojkarna (12)
- Most Goals Conceded – Örebro SK (23)
- Fewest Goals Conceded – AIK (8)

=== Away ===
- Most Wins – IFK Göteborg (8)
- Fewest Wins – Örebro SK and IF Brommapojkarna (1)
- Most Losses – Hammarby IF, Gefle IF, Örebro SK and Trelleborgs FF (8)
- Fewest Losses – IFK Göteborg and Djurgårdens IF (3)
- Most Goals Scored – IFK Göteborg (26)
- Fewest Goals Scored – Trelleborgs FF (7)
- Most Goals Conceded – IF Brommapojkarna (26)
- Fewest Goals Conceded – Djurgårdens IF (12)

=== Attendances ===
	Club	Home average	Away average	Home high
1	AIK	20,465	13,059	34,116
2	IFK Göteborg	15,797	11,968	41,471
3	Djurgårdens IF	14,148	12,960	32,529
4	Hammarby IF	13,505	12,575	25,870
5	Malmö FF	13,364	10,296	22,746
6	Helsingborgs IF	12,000	9,700	16,500
7	IF Elfsborg	11,866	10,703	16,599
8	Örebro SK	8,818	7,714	11,565
9	Halmstads BK	7,360	8,151	11,029
10	GAIS	6,887	10,584	30,956
11	Kalmar FF	6,219	9,414	9,747
12	Gefle IF	5,155	7,797	7,130
13	IF Brommapojkarna	4,571	8,173	15,092
14	Trelleborgs FF	3,458	10,516	9,045
—	Total	10,258	—	41,471
