= 2012 IFK Göteborg season =

IFK Göteborg
2012 season
- Chairman: Kent Olsson
- Head coach: Mikael Stahre
- Stadium: Gamla Ullevi
- Allsvenskan: 7th
- Top goalscorer: League: Hannes Stiller (7); All: Hannes Stiller (7)
- Highest home attendance: 15,334 vs. IFK Norrköping (9 April 2012, Allsvenskan)
- Lowest home attendance: 5,758 vs. Mjällby AIF (12 August 2012, Allsvenskan)
- Average home league attendance: 10,493
Home colours	Away colours

The 2012 season was IFK Göteborg's 107th in existence, their 80th season in Allsvenskan and their 36th consecutive season in the league. They competed in Allsvenskan where they finished seventh for the third time in a row. IFK Göteborg also participated in one competition in which the club continued playing in for the 2013 season, 2012–13 Svenska Cupen.

Mikael Stahre was appointed new head coach, this after the contract of the former head coach Jonas Olsson wasn't extended. A new captain was announced since former captain Adam Johansson left the squad. Forward Tobias Hysén took over the captaincy.

== Players ==
=== Squad ===
Note: Flags indicate national team as defined under FIFA eligibility rules; some limited exceptions apply. Players may hold more than one non-FIFA nationality.

No.	Pos.	Nation	Player
1	GK	SWE	John Alvbåge
2	DF	SWE	Emil Salomonsson
3	DF	ISL	Logi Valgarðsson
4	DF	NOR	Kjetil Wæhler
5	MF	SWE	Philip Haglund
6	FW	SWE	Nicklas Bärkroth
7	FW	SWE	Tobias Hysén (captain)
8	MF	SWE	Nordin Gerzić
9	MF	SWE	Stefan Selaković (vice captain)
10	MF	BRA	Daniel Sobralense
11	FW	SWE	Robin Söder
12	GK	SWE	August Strömberg
14	DF	ISL	Hjálmar Jónsson

No.	Pos.	Nation	Player
15	MF	SWE	Jakob Johansson
16	DF	SWE	Erik Lund
17	FW	SWE	Sam Larsson
19	FW	SWE	Hannes Stiller
20	DF	SWE	Jonathan Azulay
21	MF	SWE	Pontus Farnerud
22	MF	SWE	Tobias Sana
24	DF	SWE	Mikael Dyrestam
25	GK	SWE	Erik Dahlin
26	FW	SWE	David Moberg Karlsson
27	MF	SWE	Joel Allansson
30	DF	SWE	Mattias Bjärsmyr

=== Players in/out ===
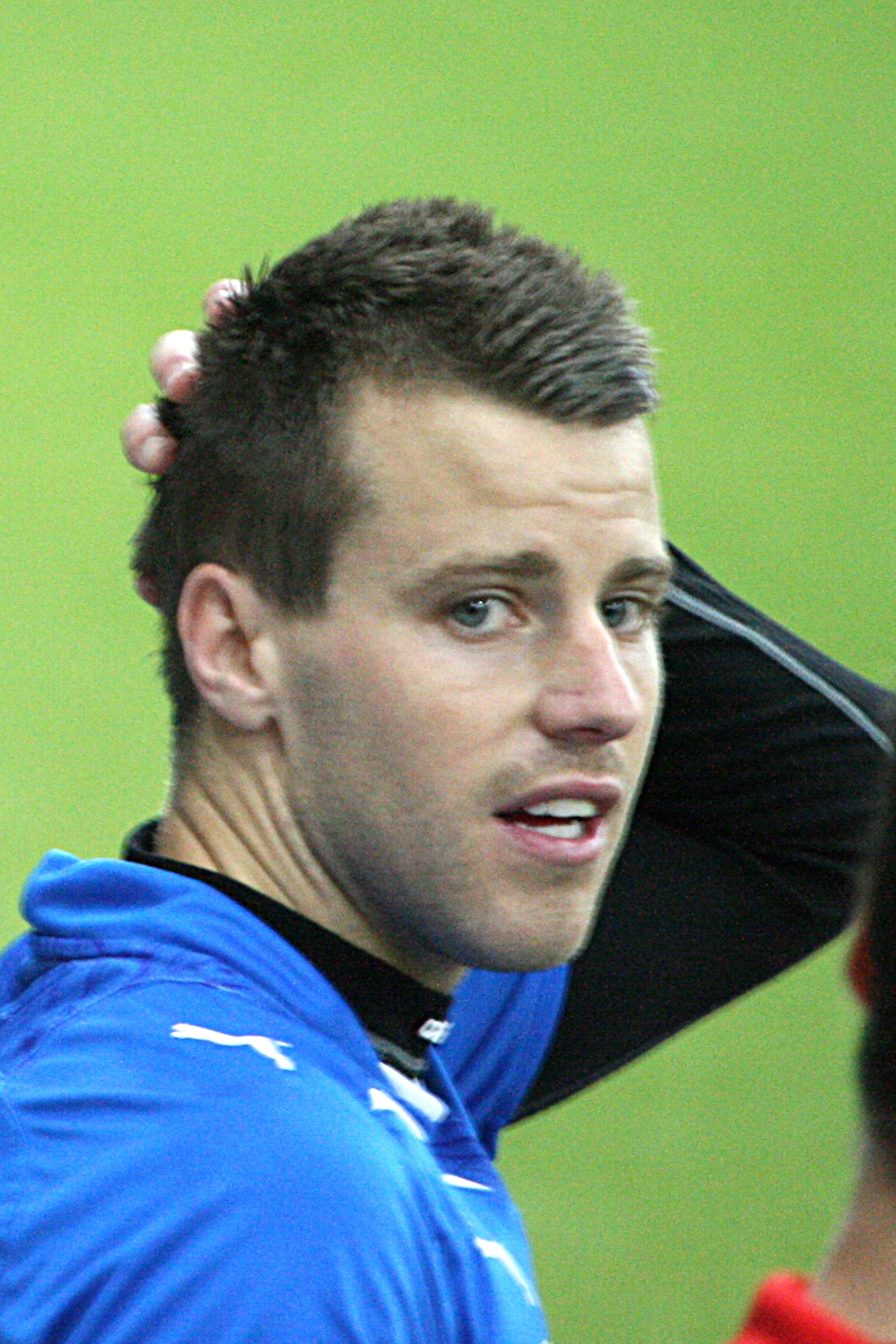
Former international midfielder Pontus Farnerud joined IFK Göteborg on a two year contract.

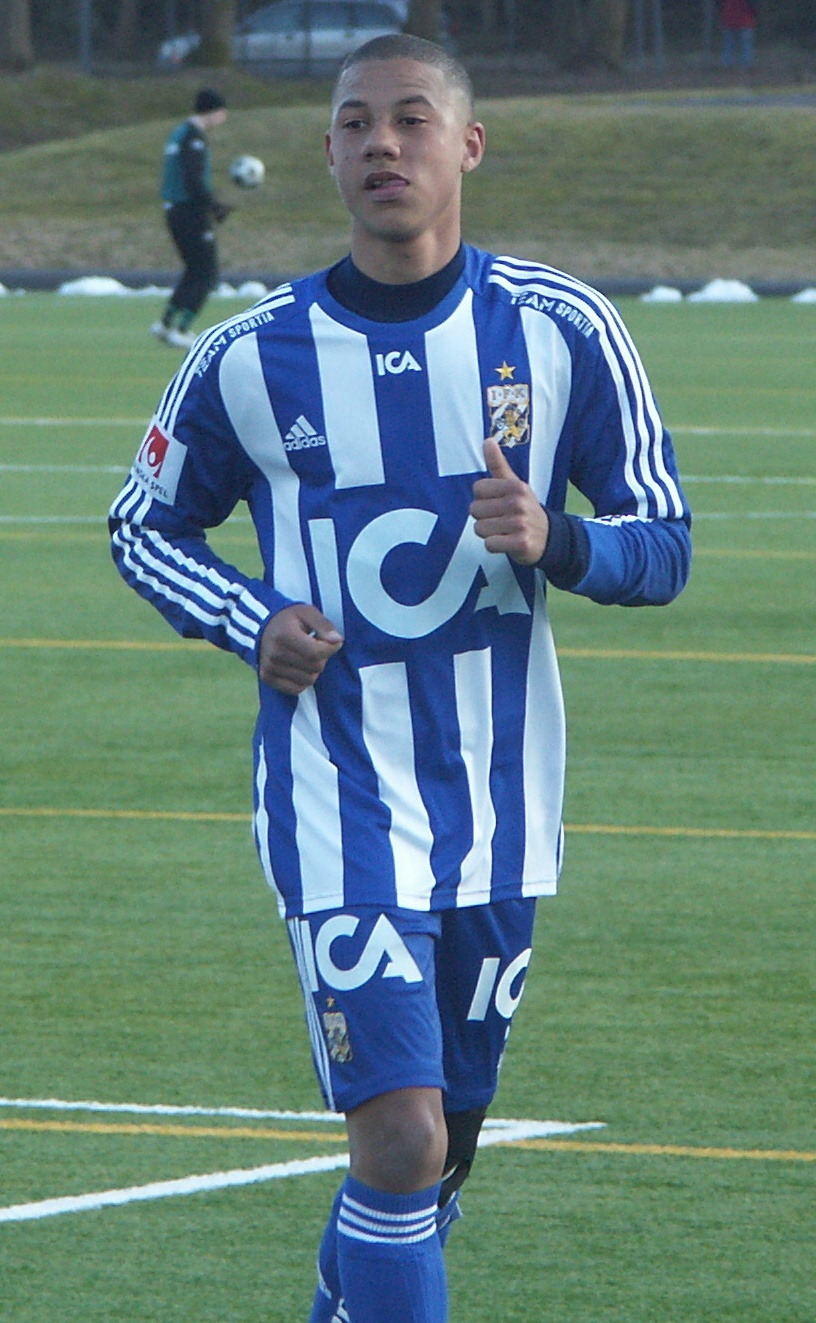
Midfielder Tobias Sana left the club for Ajax in Eredivisie.

==== In ====
No.	Pos.	Nat.	Name	Age	Moving from	Type	Transfer window	Ends	Transfer fee	Source
10	MF	(Brazil)	Daniel Sobralense	28	Kalmar FF	Bosman	Winter	2015	Free	ifkgoteborg.se
1	GK	(Sweden)	John Alvbåge	29	Örebro SK	Bosman	Winter	2015	Free	ifkgoteborg.se
12	GK	(Sweden)	August Strömberg	19	Youth system	Promoted	Winter	2012	—	ifkgoteborg.se
21	FW	(Sweden)	Nicklas Bärkroth	19	IF Brommapojkarna	Loan return	Winter	2013	—	ifkgoteborg.se
18	FW	(Sweden)	Pär Ericsson	23	Mjällby AIF	Loan return	Winter	2013	—	ifkgoteborg.se
8	MF	(Sweden)	Thomas Olsson	35	Åtvidabergs FF	Loan return	Winter	2011	—	ifkgoteborg.se
20	MF	(Sweden)	Alexander Faltsetas	24	IK Brage	Loan return	Winter	2011	—	ifkgoteborg.se
4	DF	(Norway)	Kjetil Wæhler	35	AaB	Transfer	Winter	2013	Undisclosed	ifkgoteborg.se
8	MF	(Sweden)	Nordin Gerzić	28	Örebro SK	Transfer	Winter	2015	(~ 7.5M SEK)	ifkgoteborg.se
21	MF	(Sweden)	Pontus Farnerud	31	Stabæk	Bosman	Winter	2013	Free	ifkgoteborg.se
26	FW	(Sweden)	David Moberg Karlsson	18	Youth system	Promoted	Summer	2016	—	ifkgoteborg.se
17	FW	(Sweden)	Sam Larsson	19	Youth system	Promoted	Summer	2015	—	ifkgoteborg.se
20	DF	(Sweden)	Jonathan Azulay	19	Youth system	Promoted	Summer	2014	—	ifkgoteborg.se
23	MF	(Sweden)	Sebastian Eriksson	23	Cagliari	Loan return	Summer	2012	—	ifkgoteborg.se
6	FW	(Sweden)	Nicklas Bärkroth	20	União de Leiria	Loan return	Summer	2013	—	ifkgoteborg.se
30	DF	(Sweden)	Mattias Bjärsmyr	26	Panathinaikos	Bosman	Summer	2013	Free	ifkgoteborg.se

==== Out ====
No.	Pos.	Nat.	Name	Age	Moving to	Type	Transfer window	Transfer fee	Source
8	MF	(Sweden)	Thomas Olsson	35	Retirement	End of contract	Winter	—	ifkgoteborg.se
29	MF	(Sweden)	Kamal Mustafa	20	Qviding FIF	End of contract	Winter	Free	fotbolltransfers.com
20	MF	(Sweden)	Alexander Faltsetas	24	Gefle IF	End of contract	Winter	Free	ifkgoteborg.se
4	FW	(Sweden)	Andreas Drugge	28	BK Häcken	Transfer	Winter	Undisclosed	ifkgoteborg.se
2	DF	(Sweden)	Karl Svensson	27	Jönköpings Södra IF	Transfer	Winter	Undisclosed	ifkgoteborg.se
6	DF	(Sweden)	Adam Johansson	28	Seattle Sounders	End of contract	Winter	Free	ifkgoteborg.se
1	GK	(Sweden)	Marcus Sandberg	21	Ljungskile SK	Loan	Winter	—	ifkgoteborg.se
28	MF	(Iceland)	Elmar Bjarnason	24	Randers FC	Transfer	Winter	(~ 1.0M SEK)	ifkgoteborg.se
21	FW	(Sweden)	Nicklas Bärkroth	20	União de Leiria	Loan	Winter	—	ifkgoteborg.se
18	FW	(Sweden)	Pär Ericsson	23	Mjällby AIF	Loan	Winter	—	ifkgoteborg.se
23	MF	(Sweden)	Sebastian Eriksson	23	Cagliari	Transfer	Summer	(~ 17.5M SEK)	fotbolltransfers.com
22	MF	(Sweden)	Tobias Sana	23	Ajax	Transfer	Summer	(~ 3.0M SEK)	ifkgoteborg.se

== Squad statistics ==
=== Appearances and goals ===
Number	Position	Name	2012 Allsvenskan		2012–13 Svenska Cupen		Total	
Number	Position	Name	Appearances	Goals	Appearances	Goals	Appearances	Goals
1	GK	John Alvbåge	23	0	1	0	24	0
2	DF	Emil Salomonsson	27	0	1	2	28	2
3	DF	Logi Valgarðsson	22	0	1	0	23	0
4	DF	Kjetil Wæhler	24	0	0	0	24	0
5	MF	Philip Haglund	24	0	0	0	24	0
6	FW	Nicklas Bärkroth	3	0	1	1	4	1
7	FW	Tobias Hysén	30	6	1	0	31	6
8	MF	Nordin Gerzić	23	2	1	1	24	3
9	MF	Stefan Selaković	24	4	1	0	25	4
10	MF	Daniel Sobralense	21	4	1	2	22	6
11	FW	Robin Söder	23	2	1	1	24	3
12	GK	August Strömberg	0	0	0	0	0	0
14	DF	Hjálmar Jónsson	17	1	0	0	17	1
15	MF	Jakob Johansson	22	0	1	0	23	0
16	DF	Erik Lund	1	0	0	0	1	0
17	FW	Sam Larsson	2	0	0	0	2	0
19	FW	Hannes Stiller	27	7	0	0	27	7
20	DF	Jonathan Azulay	1	0	0	0	1	0
21	MF	Pontus Farnerud	28	4	1	1	29	5
24	DF	Mikael Dyrestam	7	1	1	0	8	1
25	GK	Erik Dahlin	7	0	0	0	7	0
26	FW	David Moberg Karlsson	18	0	1	1	19	1
27	MF	Joel Allansson	20	2	1	0	21	2
30	DF	Mattias Bjärsmyr	8	1	0	0	8	1
Players that left the club during the season
22	MF	Tobias Sana	11	2	0	0	11	2

=== Disciplinary record ===
N	P	Nat.	Name	Allsvenskan			Svenska Cupen			Total			Notes
N	P	Nat.	Name	Yellow card	Second yellow card	Red card	Yellow card	Second yellow card	Red card	Yellow card	Second yellow card	Red card	Notes
1	GK	(Sweden)	John Alvbåge	1						1			
2	DF	(Sweden)	Emil Salomonsson	4						4			
3	DF	(Iceland)	Logi Valgarðsson	4						4			
4	DF	(Norway)	Kjetil Wæhler	5	1					5	1		
5	MF	(Sweden)	Philip Haglund	5						5			
8	MF	(Sweden)	Nordin Gerzić	6						6			
9	MF	(Sweden)	Stefan Selaković	6						6			
10	MF	(Brazil)	Daniel Sobralense	3						3			
11	FW	(Sweden)	Robin Söder	3						3			
14	DF	(Iceland)	Hjálmar Jónsson	1		1				1		1	
15	MF	(Sweden)	Jakob Johansson	1						1			
19	FW	(Sweden)	Hannes Stiller	1						1			
21	MF	(Sweden)	Pontus Farnerud	3						3			
22	MF	(Sweden)	Tobias Sana	3						3			
27	MF	(Sweden)	Joel Allansson	2						2			
30	DF	(Sweden)	Mattias Bjärsmyr	3						3			

Source: ifkgoteborg.se
Only competitive matches
(yellow card) = Number of bookings; (second yellow card) = Number of sending offs after a second yellow card; (red card) = Number of sending offs by a direct red card.

== Club ==
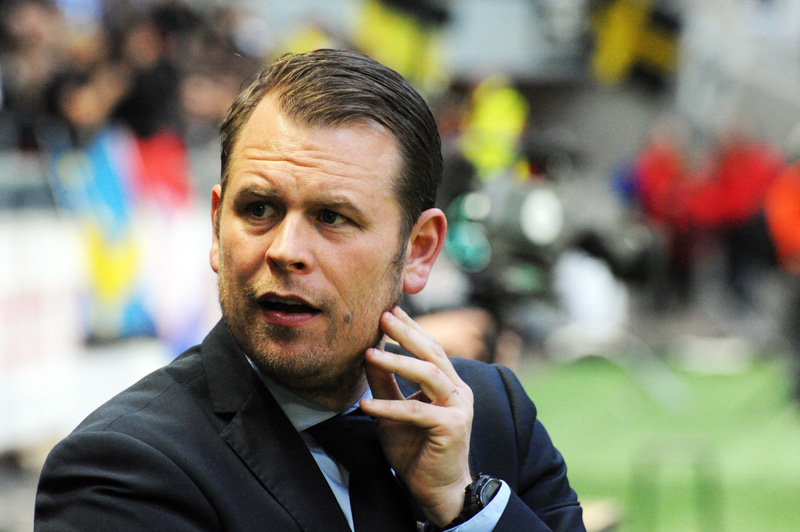
The 2012 season was Mikael Stahre's first season with IFK Göteborg.

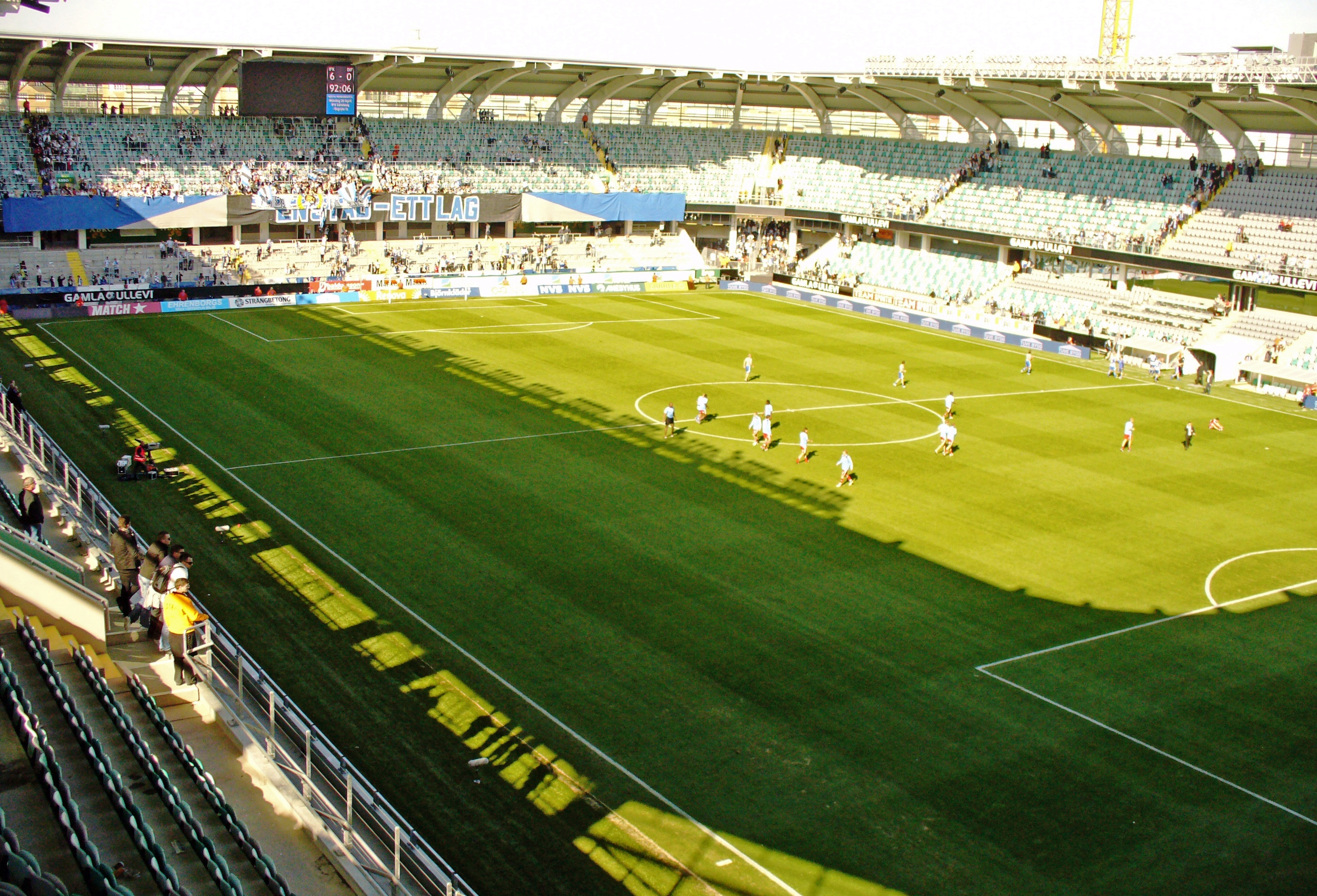
Gamla Ullevi was the third largest stadium in Allsvenskan in 2012.

=== Coaching staff ===
Name	Role
(Sweden) Mikael Stahre	Head coach
(Sweden) Magnus Edlund	Assistant coach / U21 head coach
(Sweden) Roland Kaldéus	Fitness coach
(Sweden) Stefan Remnér	Goalkeeping coach
(Sweden) Fredrik Larsson	Physiotherapist
(Sweden) Tim Rahmquist	Physiotherapist
(Sweden) Jon Karlsson	Club doctor
(Sweden) Leif Swärd	Club doctor
(Sweden) Vahid Hamidy	Club doctor
(Sweden) Johan Örtendahl	Mental coach
(Sweden) Bertil Lundqvist	Equipment manager
(Sweden) Thomas Olsson	U21 assistant coach
(Sweden) Jens Wålemark	U19 head coach
(Sweden) Roger Gustafsson	Head coach youth academy
(Sweden) Olle Sultan	Head scout

=== Other information ===
Chairman	(Sweden) Kent Olsson
Club director	(Sweden) Seppo Vaihela
Director of sports	(Sweden) Håkan Mild
Ground (capacity and dimensions)	Gamla Ullevi (18,900 / 105x68 m)

Source: IFK Göteborg and Gamla Ullevi

== Competitions ==
=== Overall ===
Competition	Started round	Final position / round	First match	Last match
Allsvenskan	N/A	7th	1 April 2012	4 November 2012

Source: Competitions

=== Allsvenskan ===
==== League table ====
Pos	Team	Pld	W	D	L	GF	GA	GD	Pts	Qualification or relegation
5	IFK Norrköping	30	15	7	8	50	43	+7	52	
6	Helsingborgs IF	30	13	11	6	52	33	+19	50	
7	IFK Göteborg	30	9	12	9	36	41	−5	39	Qualification to Europa League second qualifying round (Note: IFK Göteborg qualified for the 2013–14 UEFA Europa League second qualifying round by winning the 2012–13 Svenska Cupen.)
8	Åtvidabergs FF	30	9	10	11	48	48	0	37	
9	Djurgårdens IF	30	8	13	9	37	40	−3	37	

Source: svenskfotboll.se (in Swedish)
Rules for classification: 1) points; 2) goal difference; 3) number of goals scored.

==== Results summary ====
Overall								Home						Away					
Pld	W	D	L	GF	GA	GD	Pts	W	D	L	GF	GA	GD	W	D	L	GF	GA	GD
30	9	12	9	36	41	−5	39	6	7	2	21	15	+6	3	5	7	15	26	−11

Source: svenskfotboll.se (in Swedish)

==== Results by round ====
Round	1	2	3	4	5	6	7	8	9	10	11	12	13	14	15	16	17	18	19	20	21	22	23	24	25	26	27	28	29	30
Ground	A	H	A	H	A	H	H	A	H	A	A	H	A	H	H	A	H	A	H	A	A	H	H	A	H	A	H	A	A	H
Result	L	L	D	D	W	W	W	L	D	D	D	D	L	D	D	L	W	D	W	L	D	W	D	W	D	W	L	L	L	W
Position	14	15	16	15	12	10	5	8	8	8	9	10	13	12	11	12	11	12	10	11	11	10	9	8	8	7	8	9	10	7

Source: see below
A = Away; H = Home; W = Win; D = Draw; L = Loss

==== Matches ====
Kickoff times are in UTC+2 unless stated otherwise.

1 April 2012 Round 1	Syrianska FC	2–1	IFK Göteborg	Södertälje
17:30	Touma 52'; Aganović 54'	Report	Sobralense 17'	Stadium: Södertälje Fotbollsarena; Attendance: 4,451; Referee: Stefan Johannesson (Täby)

9 April 2012 Round 2	IFK Göteborg	1–2	IFK Norrköping	Gothenburg
15:00	Hysén 51'	Report	Hasani 62' (pen.), 76'	Stadium: Gamla Ullevi; Attendance: 15,334; Referee: Martin Hansson (Holmsjö)

12 April 2012 Round 3	AIK	1–1	IFK Göteborg	Solna
19:05	Engblom 68'	Report	Jónsson 90+3'	Stadium: Råsunda Stadium; Attendance: 15,702; Referee: Jonas Eriksson (Sigtuna)

15 April 2012 Round 4	IFK Göteborg	2–2	Örebro SK	Gothenburg
17:30	Sana 45+1'; Farnerud 86'	Report	Atashkadeh 47'; Grahn 75'	Stadium: Gamla Ullevi; Attendance: 10,039; Referee: Martin Strömbergsson (Gävle)

23 April 2012 Round 5	BK Häcken	1–2	IFK Göteborg	Gothenburg
19:00	Östberg 5'	Report	Sana 68'; Selaković 85' (pen.)	Stadium: Rambergsvallen; Attendance: 6,040; Referee: Jonas Eriksson (Sigtuna)

28 April 2012 Round 6	IFK Göteborg	2–1	Åtvidabergs FF	Gothenburg
16:00	Stiller 41', 45+1'	Report	Arvidsson 69'	Stadium: Gamla Ullevi; Attendance: 11,855; Referee: Andreas Ekberg (Lund)

2 May 2012 Round 7	IFK Göteborg	2–0	GIF Sundsvall	Gothenburg
19:00	Stiller 5'; Allansson 29'	Report		Stadium: Gamla Ullevi; Attendance: 8,680; Referee: Tobias Mattsson (Karlstad)

7 May 2012 Round 8	IF Elfsborg	1–0	IFK Göteborg	Borås
19:05	Nilsson 13' (pen.)	Report		Stadium: Borås Arena; Attendance: 16,014; Referee: Markus Strömbergsson (Gävle)

14 May 2012 Round 9	IFK Göteborg	2–2	Malmö FF	Gothenburg
19:05	Söder 31'; Dyrestam 78'	Report	Thern 44'; Nilsson 90+2'	Stadium: Gamla Ullevi; Attendance: 12,549; Referee: Stefan Johannesson (Täby)

17 May 2012 Round 10	Mjällby AIF	1–1	IFK Göteborg	Hällevik
15:00	Fejzullahu 24'	Report	Söder 52'	Stadium: Strandvallen; Attendance: 6,112; Referee: Martin Strömbergsson (Gävle)

21 May 2012 Round 11	GAIS	1–1	IFK Göteborg	Gothenburg
19:05	M. Gustafsson 7'	Report	Hysén 54'	Stadium: Gamla Ullevi; Attendance: 16,921; Referee: Bojan Pandžić (Gothenburg)

24 May 2012 Round 12	IFK Göteborg	1–1	Kalmar FF	Gothenburg
19:00	Allansson 48'	Report	McDonald 75'	Stadium: Gamla Ullevi; Attendance: 9,402; Referee: Martin Strömbergsson (Gävle)

3 July 2012 Round 13	Djurgårdens IF	3–2	IFK Göteborg	Stockholm
19:00	Keene 29', 56'; Sjölund 52'	Report	Sobralense 21'; Hysén 72'	Stadium: Stockholms Stadion; Attendance: 10,115; Referee: Michael Lerjéus (Skövde)

9 July 2012 Round 14	IFK Göteborg	1–1	Helsingborgs IF	Gothenburg
19:05	Selaković 39'	Report	Finnbogason 85'	Stadium: Gamla Ullevi; Attendance: 12,029; Referee: Stefan Johannesson (Täby)

14 July 2012 Round 15	IFK Göteborg	1–1	Gefle IF	Gothenburg
16:00	Farnerud 21'	Report	Faltsetas 70'	Stadium: Gamla Ullevi; Attendance: 8,851; Referee: Kristoffer Karlsson (Helsingborg)

21 July 2012 Round 16	Gefle IF	5–0	IFK Göteborg	Gävle
16:00	Bernhardsson 38'; Orlov 48'; Dahlberg 66'; Faltsetas 87', 90+1'	Report		Stadium: Strömvallen; Attendance: 4,420; Referee: Jonas Eriksson (Sigtuna)

31 July 2012 Round 17	IFK Göteborg	1–0	Syrianska FC	Gothenburg
19:00	Hysén 13'	Report		Stadium: Gamla Ullevi; Attendance: 8,453; Referee: Johan Hamlin (Bro)

6 August 2012 Round 18	IFK Norrköping	0–0	IFK Göteborg	Norrköping
19:05		Report		Stadium: Nya Parken; Attendance: 8,723; Referee: Markus Strömbergsson (Gävle)

12 August 2012 Round 19	IFK Göteborg	4–2	Mjällby AIF	Gothenburg
15:00	Sobralense 1', 58'; Farnerud 86'; Selaković 90' (pen.)	Report	Ericsson 42'; Ekenberg 69'	Stadium: Gamla Ullevi; Attendance: 5,758; Referee: Michael Lerjéus (Skövde)

26 August 2012 Round 20	Kalmar FF	3–0	IFK Göteborg	Kalmar
17:30	Dauda 27', 67'; McDonald 90+3'	Report		Stadium: Guldfågeln Arena; Attendance: 8,026; Referee: Martin Strömbergsson (Gävle)

2 September 2012 Round 21	GIF Sundsvall	3–3	IFK Göteborg	Sundsvall
17:30	Forsberg 14', 49'; Sellin 44'	Report	Gerzić 77'; Stiller 85'; Bjärsmyr 88'	Stadium: Norrporten Arena; Attendance: 6,085; Referee: Andreas Ekberg (Lund)

16 September 2012 Round 22	IFK Göteborg	2–1	IF Elfsborg	Gothenburg
16:30	Hysén 32'; Farnerud 75'	Report	Rohdén 7'	Stadium: Gamla Ullevi; Attendance: 14,102; Referee: Stefan Johannesson (Täby)

24 September 2012 Round 23	IFK Göteborg	0–0	GAIS	Gothenburg
18:30		Report		Stadium: Gamla Ullevi; Attendance: 13,268; Referee: Markus Strömbergsson (Gävle)

27 September 2012 Round 24	Malmö FF	1–2	IFK Göteborg	Malmö
20:05	Rantie 1'	Report	Hysén 68'; Stiller 87'	Stadium: Swedbank Stadion; Attendance: 15,109; Referee: Martin Strömbergsson (Gävle)

1 October 2012 Round 25	IFK Göteborg	1–1	BK Häcken	Gothenburg
19:05	Stiller 71'	Report	Ericsson 35'	Stadium: Gamla Ullevi; Attendance: 10,333; Referee: Martin Hansson (Holmsjö)

6 October 2012 Round 26	Åtvidabergs FF	1–2	IFK Göteborg	Åtvidaberg
16:00	Prodell 36'	Report	Gerzić 32'; Stiller 68'	Stadium: Kopparvallen; Attendance: 5,257; Referee: Tobias Mattsson (Karlstad)

21 October 2012 Round 27	IFK Göteborg	0–1	AIK	Gothenburg
17:30		Report	Backman 15'	Stadium: Gamla Ullevi; Attendance: 10,727; Referee: Michael Lerjéus (Skövde)

28 October 2012 Round 28	Örebro SK	1–0	IFK Göteborg	Örebro
15:00 UTC+1	Hasani 14'	Report		Stadium: Behrn Arena; Attendance: 2,811; Referee: Martin Strömbergsson (Gävle)

31 October 2012 Round 29	Helsingborgs IF	2–0	IFK Göteborg	Helsingborg
19:00 UTC+1	Đurđić 50'; Santos 76' (pen.)	Report		Stadium: Olympia; Attendance: 9,016; Referee: Markus Strömbergsson (Gävle)

4 November 2012 Round 30	IFK Göteborg	1–0	Djurgårdens IF	Gothenburg
15:00 UTC+1	Selaković 44'	Report		Stadium: Gamla Ullevi; Attendance: 6,017; Referee: Tobias Mattsson (Karlstad)

=== Svenska Cupen ===
==== 2012–13 ====
The tournament continued into the 2013 season.

===== Qualification stage =====
20 August 2012 Round 2	Långholmen FC	0–9	IFK Göteborg	Stockholm
19:00 UTC+2		Report	Söder 13'; Salomonsson 17', 87'; Sobralense 34', 56'; Bärkroth 45'; Moberg Karlsson 49'; Gerzić 83'; Farnerud 90'	Stadium: Grimsta IP; Attendance: 670; Referee: Jonas Bäcklund (Solna)

== Non-competitive ==
=== Pre-season ===
Kickoff times are in UTC+1 unless stated otherwise.

28 January 2012 Copa del Sol; Group stage	IFK Göteborg (Sweden)	2–2 (2–4 p)	(Russia) Spartak Moscow	Benidorm, Spain
19:00	Hysén 36'; Haglund 65'	Report	Welliton 39'; Emenike 69'	Stadium: Estadio Municipal Guillermo Amor; Attendance: 300; Referee: Espen Berntsen (Norway)
	Penalties
	Hysén (penalty missed); Sobralense (penalty scored); Allansson (penalty scored); Valgarðsson (penalty missed)		(penalty missed) Parshivlyuk; (penalty scored) McGeady; (penalty scored) Ananidze; (penalty scored) Rojo; (penalty scored) Ari

31 January 2012 Copa del Sol; Group stage	Olimpija (Slovenia)	1–1 (5–3 p)	(Sweden) IFK Göteborg	Benidorm, Spain
19:00	Djermanović 4'	Report	Dyrestam 51'	Stadium: Estadio Municipal Guillermo Amor; Attendance: 100; Referee: Dag Vidar Hafsas (Norway)
	Penalties
	Sretenović (penalty scored); Vršič (penalty scored); Fink (penalty scored); Anđelković (penalty scored); Ivelja (penalty scored)		(penalty missed) Selaković; (penalty scored) Hysén; (penalty scored) Salomonsson; (penalty scored) Jónsson

4 February 2012 Copa del Sol; Group stage	Rosenborg BK (Norway)	0–1	(Sweden) IFK Göteborg	Benidorm, Spain
19:00		Report	Sobralense 50'	Stadium: Estadio Municipal Guillermo Amor; Attendance: 100; Referee: Kristinn Jakobsson (Iceland)

18 February 2012 Friendly	IFK Göteborg	4–0	Degerfors IF	Gothenburg, Sweden
14:00	Selaković 12'; Söder 23'; Hysén 27'; Salomonsson 64'	Report		Stadium: Valhalla IP; Attendance: 3,219; Referee: Mattias Nyman (Kungsbacka)

25 February 2012 Friendly	IFK Göteborg (Sweden)	2–2	(Norway) Fredrikstad FK	Gothenburg, Sweden
14:00	Gerzić 49'; Farnerud 90'	Report	Elyounoussi 4'; Hussain 27'	Stadium: Valhalla IP; Attendance: 3,846; Referee: Kristoffer Karlsson (Helsingborg)

3 March 2012 Friendly	IFK Göteborg (Sweden)	3–0	(Norway) Lillestrøm SK	Gothenburg, Sweden
14:00	Hysén 42'; Söder 57'; Larsson 90'	Report		Stadium: Valhalla IP; Attendance: 3,554; Referee: Michael Lerjéus (Skövde)

13 March 2012 Friendly	IFK Göteborg (Sweden)	0–1	(Belarus) BATE Borisov	Antalya, Turkey
16:30 UTC+2		Report	Baha 9'	Stadium: Cornelia Diamond Centre

16 March 2012 Friendly	Fakel Voronezh (Russia)	0–2	(Sweden) IFK Göteborg	Antalya, Turkey
16:30 UTC+2		Report	Söder 44'; Valgarðsson 52'	Stadium: Cornelia Diamond Centre; Attendance: 30

25 March 2012 Friendly	IFK Göteborg	3–1	Falkenbergs FF	Gothenburg, Sweden
14:00 UTC+2	Hysén 16'; Stiller 79'; Sana 88'	Report	Rodevåg 73'	Stadium: Valhalla IP; Attendance: 2,381; Referee: Lars Olsson (Umeå)

=== Mid-season ===
Kickoff times are in UTC+2.

13 June 2012 Friendly	IFK Göteborg (Sweden)	3–3	(Norway) Rosenborg BK	Halmstad, Sweden
16:00	Farnerud 5'; Söder 50'; Sobralense 78'	Report	Prica 3', 17'; Svensson 80'	Stadium: Halmstad Arena; Attendance: 100; Referee: Magnus Ahlsén (Linköping)

19 June 2012 Friendly	IFK Göteborg	5–0	Örgryte IS	Gothenburg, Sweden
18:00	Söder 13'; Selaković 32', 55', 59'; Moberg Karlsson 68'	Report		Stadium: Hjällbovallen; Attendance: 729; Referee: Nermin Čisić (Värnamo)

25 June 2012 Friendly	IFK Göteborg (Sweden)	2–0	(Denmark) AGF	Stenungsund, Sweden
18:30	Söder 31'; Moberg Karlsson 66'	Report		Stadium: Nösnäsvallen; Attendance: 864; Referee: Magnus Lindgren (Gothenburg)
