= 2013 IFK Göteborg season =

IFK Göteborg
2013 season
- Chairman: Bertil Rignäs
- Head coach: Mikael Stahre
- Stadium: Gamla Ullevi
- Allsvenskan: 3rd
- 2012–13 Svenska Cupen: Winners
- Svenska Supercupen: Runners-up
- 2013–14 UEFA Europa League: Second qualifying round
- Top goalscorer: League: Tobias Hysén (14); All: Tobias Hysén (22)
- Highest home attendance: 17,063 vs. Malmö FF (25 April 2013, Allsvenskan)
- Lowest home attendance: 1,838 vs. Kalmar FF (17 March 2013, Svenska Cupen); Allsvenskan: 7,131 vs. Åtvidabergs FF (1 September 2013)
- Average home league attendance: 11,589
Home colours	Away colours

The 2013 season was IFK Göteborg's 108th in existence, their 81st season in Allsvenskan and their 37th consecutive season in the league. They competed in Allsvenskan where they finished third, Svenska Cupen where they won the competition, Svenska Supercupen where they finished as runners-up and the UEFA Europa League where they were knocked out in the second qualifying round. IFK Göteborg also participated in one competition in which the club continued playing in for the 2014 season, 2013–14 Svenska Cupen. The season began with the group stage of Svenska Cupen in March, league play started in April and lasted until November, Svenska Supercupen was the last competitive match of the season.

The club won their 6th Svenska Cupen title on 26 May 2013 when they defeated Djurgårdens IF after a penalty shoot-out in the final at Friends Arena.

== Summary ==
=== Svenska Supercupen ===
IFK Göteborg qualified for the 2013 Svenska Supercupen by winning the 2012–13 Svenska Cupen on 26 May 2013. The match was played at Swedbank Stadion on 10 November 2013 and the club's opponents were 2013 Allsvenskan winners Malmö FF. This was the fourth time that the club competed in Svenska Supercupen. The previous times had ended in a win against Kalmar FF in 2008 and two losses against Kalmar FF in 2009 and AIK in 2010. The match ended in a 3–2 win for Malmö FF after Emil Forsberg scored two goals and Guillermo Molins scored the third and winning goal in injury time. Philip Haglund and Lasse Vibe scored the goals for IFK Göteborg.

=== UEFA Europa League ===
IFK Göteborg qualified for the 2013–14 UEFA Europa League by merit of winning the 2012–13 Svenska Cupen. The club entered the competition in the second round of qualification. The draw for the second qualifying round was held on 23 June, IFK Göteborg was seeded in the draw. The club was drawn against the 2012–13 Slovak third-placed team Trenčín. This was the first time ever that IFK Göteborg faced Slovak opposition in European competition. The first leg of the fixture was played at home on 18 July and ended in a 0–0 draw. The match was played at Olympia in Helsingborg since both Gamla Ullevi and Ullevi was busy with other events. The away fixture at Mestský štadión in Dubnica nad Váhom was played on 25 July and ended with a 2–1 loss for IFK Göteborg after two goals from Fanendo Adi, which confirmed the aggregate score to 2–1 in favour of Trenčín.

== Key events ==
- 1 November 2012: Midfielder Stefan Selaković leaves the club. On 23 January 2013 he joined Allsvenskan rival Halmstads BK.
- 7 November 2012: Club director Seppo Vaihela announces his resignation from the club.
- 16 November 2012: Chairman Kent Olsson announces his resignation from the club.
- 23 November 2012: Forward Hannes Stiller signs a new one-year contract, keeping him at the club until the end of the season.
- 4 December 2012: Goalkeeper Erik Dahlin leaves the club, transferring to Sogndal IL.
- 12 December 2012: Goalkeeper August Strömberg leaves the club, transferring to Degerfors IF.
- 15 December 2012: Defender Hjálmar Jónsson signs a new two-year contract, keeping him at the club until the end of the 2014 season.
- 2 January 2013: Forward Sebastian Ohlsson is promoted to the first-team squad, signing a one-year contract to keep him at the club until the end of the season. He is instantly loaned out to Örgryte IS for the duration of the season.
- 6 January 2013: Defender Ludwig Augustinsson joins the club on a four-year contract, transferring from IF Brommapojkarna. Nicklas Bärkroth goes in the opposite direction, leaving the club for IF Brommapojkarna.
- 21 January 2013: Defender Jonathan Azulay leaves the club on loan to Örgryte IS for the duration of the season.
- 16 February 2013: Forward Robin Söder signs a new two-year contract, keeping him at the club until the end of the 2015 season.
- 17 February 2013: Midfielder Jakob Johansson is selected as 2012 Archangel of the Year, an annual price given by the Supporterklubben Änglarna to a player who has shown a great loyalty to IFK Göteborg.
- 4 March 2013: Martin Kurzwelly is announced as new club director. Bertil Rignäs is selected as new chairman at the annual meeting.
- 26 March 2013: Defender Adam Johansson joins the club on a four-year contract, transferring from Seattle Sounders FC.
- 29 March 2013: Midfielder Jakob Johansson signs a new one-year contract, keeping him at the club until the end of the 2014 season.
- 30 March 2013: Defender Erik Lund leaves the club on loan to Örebro SK until 1 August 2013.
- 26 May 2013: IFK Göteborg wins their 6th Svenska Cupen title after defeating Djurgårdens IF in the final.
- 19 June 2013: Midfielder Lasse Vibe joins the club on a three-year contract, transferring from SønderjyskE. Forward David Moberg Karlsson leaves the club, transferring to Sunderland.
- 20 June 2013: Defender Mattias Bjärsmyr signs a new four-year contract, keeping him at the club until the end of the 2017 season.
- 2 August 2013: Midfielder Darijan Bojanić joins the club on a four-and-a-half-year contract, transferring from Östers IF.
- 6 August 2013: Midfielder Nordin Gerzić leaves the club on loan to Örebro SK for the rest of the season.
- 8 November 2013: Forward and captain Tobias Hysén is selected as Allsvenskan forward of the year and Allsvenskan most valuable player of the year. Goalkeeper John Alvbåge is selected as Allsvenskan voice of the year.

== Players ==
=== Squad ===
Note: Flags indicate national team as defined under FIFA eligibility rules; some limited exceptions apply. Players may hold more than one non-FIFA nationality.

No.	Pos.	Nation	Player
1	GK	SWE	John Alvbåge
2	DF	SWE	Emil Salomonsson
3	DF	ISL	Logi Valgarðsson
4	DF	NOR	Kjetil Wæhler
5	MF	SWE	Philip Haglund
6	DF	SWE	Ludwig Augustinsson
7	FW	SWE	Tobias Hysén (captain)
8	MF	SWE	Nordin Gerzić
9	MF	DEN	Lasse Vibe
10	MF	BRA	Daniel Sobralense
11	FW	SWE	Robin Söder
12	GK	SWE	Marcus Sandberg

No.	Pos.	Nation	Player
14	DF	ISL	Hjálmar Jónsson
15	MF	SWE	Jakob Johansson
16	DF	SWE	Erik Lund
17	FW	SWE	Sam Larsson
18	MF	SWE	Darijan Bojanić
19	FW	SWE	Hannes Stiller
21	MF	SWE	Pontus Farnerud
22	DF	SWE	Adam Johansson
24	DF	SWE	Mikael Dyrestam
26	FW	SWE	David Moberg Karlsson
27	MF	SWE	Joel Allansson
30	DF	SWE	Mattias Bjärsmyr (vice captain)

==== Youth players with first-team appearances ====
Youth players who played a competitive match for the club in 2013.

Note: Flags indicate national team as defined under FIFA eligibility rules; some limited exceptions apply. Players may hold more than one non-FIFA nationality.

No.	Pos.	Nation	Player
23	FW	SWE	Gustav Engvall
26	MF	SWE	Hampus Zackrisson

No.	Pos.	Nation	Player
38	MF	SWE	Karl Bohm

=== Players in/out ===
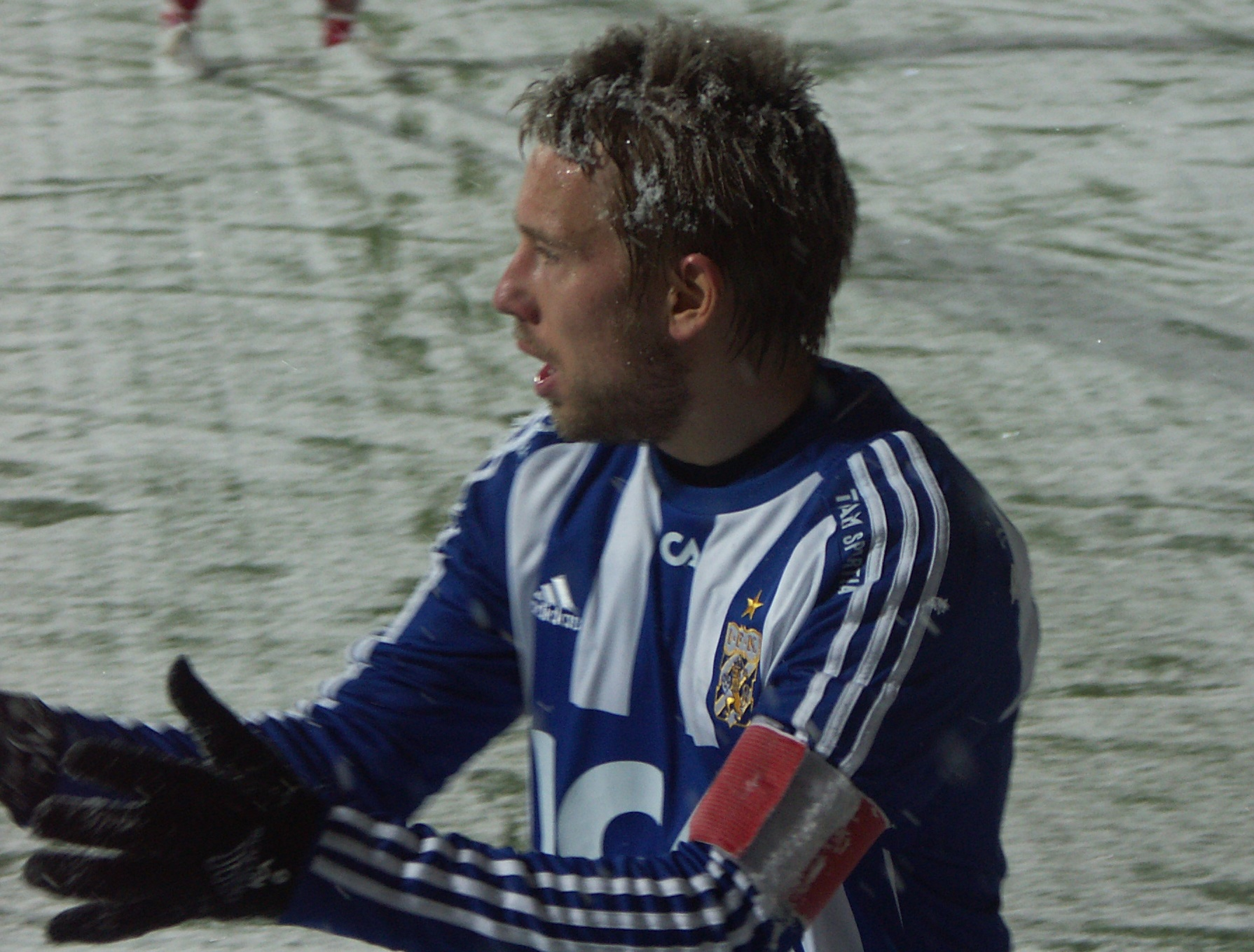
Defender Adam Johansson returned to IFK Göteborg after one season in Seattle Sounders FC.

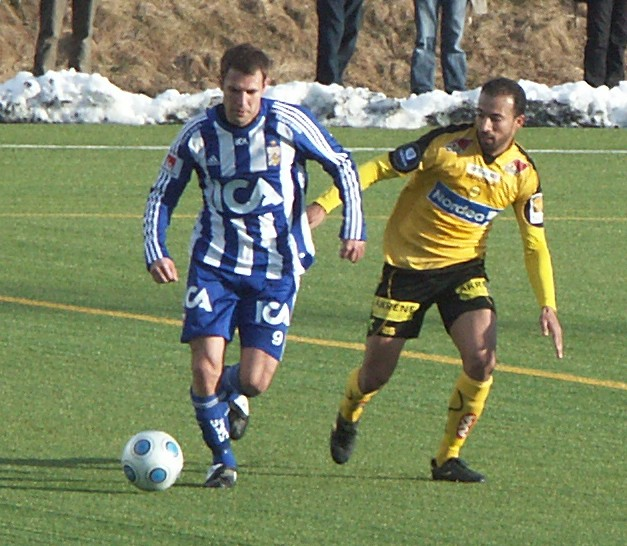
Midfielder Stefan Selaković left the club for Halmstads BK after eight seasons.

==== In ====
No.	Pos.	Nat.	Name	Age	Moving from	Type	Transfer window	Ends	Transfer fee	Source
12	GK	(Sweden)	Marcus Sandberg	22	Ljungskile SK	Loan return	Winter	2014	—	ifkgoteborg.se
13	FW	(Sweden)	Sebastian Ohlsson	19	Youth system	Promoted	Winter	2013	—	ifkgoteborg.se
6	DF	(Sweden)	Ludwig Augustinsson	18	IF Brommapojkarna	Swap	Winter	2016	(~ 3.5M SEK)	ifkgoteborg.se
22	DF	(Sweden)	Adam Johansson	30	Seattle Sounders FC	Bosman	Winter	2016	Free	ifkgoteborg.se
9	MF	(Denmark)	Lasse Vibe	26	SønderjyskE	Transfer	Summer	2016 (June)	(~ 6.0M SEK)	ifkgoteborg.se
16	DF	(Sweden)	Erik Lund	24	Örebro SK	Loan return	Summer	2013	—	ifkgoteborg.se
18	MF	(Sweden)	Darijan Bojanić	18	Östers IF	Transfer	Summer	2017	(~ 2.0M SEK)	ifkgoteborg.se

==== Out ====
No.	Pos.	Nat.	Name	Age	Moving to	Type	Transfer window	Transfer fee	Source
9	MF	(Sweden)	Stefan Selaković	36	Halmstads BK	End of contract	Winter	Free	ifkgoteborg.se
25	GK	(Sweden)	Erik Dahlin	23	Sogndal	Transfer	Winter	Undisclosed	ifkgoteborg.se
12	GK	(Sweden)	August Strömberg	20	Degerfors IF	End of contract	Winter	Free	ifkgoteborg.se
13	FW	(Sweden)	Sebastian Ohlsson	19	Örgryte IS	Loan	Winter	—	ifkgoteborg.se
6	FW	(Sweden)	Nicklas Bärkroth	20	IF Brommapojkarna	Swap	Winter	—	ifkgoteborg.se
20	DF	(Sweden)	Jonathan Azulay	19	Örgryte IS	Loan	Winter	—	ifkgoteborg.se
16	DF	(Sweden)	Erik Lund	24	Örebro SK	Loan	Winter	—	ifkgoteborg.se
26	FW	(Sweden)	David Moberg Karlsson	19	Sunderland	Transfer	Summer	(~ 18.5M SEK)	ifkgoteborg.se
8	MF	(Sweden)	Nordin Gerzić	29	Örebro SK	Loan	Summer	—	ifkgoteborg.se

== Squad statistics ==
=== Appearances and goals ===
Number	Position	Name	2013 Allsvenskan		2012–13 Svenska Cupen 2013–14 Svenska Cupen 2013 Svenska Supercupen		2013–14 UEFA Europa League		Total	
Number	Position	Name	Appearances	Goals	Appearances	Goals	Appearances	Goals	Appearances	Goals
1	GK	John Alvbåge	30	0	8	0	2	0	40	0
2	DF	Emil Salomonsson	28	0	7	0	2	0	37	0
3	DF	Logi Valgarðsson	6	0	3	0	0	0	9	0
4	DF	Kjetil Wæhler	20	2	8	0	0	0	28	2
5	MF	Philip Haglund	28	7	7	2	2	1	37	10
6	DF	Ludwig Augustinsson	1	0	3	0	0	0	4	0
7	FW	Tobias Hysén	28	14	7	8	2	0	37	22
9	MF	Lasse Vibe	14	2	2	2	2	0	18	4
10	MF	Daniel Sobralense	14	0	6	0	1	0	21	0
11	FW	Robin Söder	26	9	3	0	2	0	31	9
12	GK	Marcus Sandberg	0	0	0	0	0	0	0	0
14	DF	Hjálmar Jónsson	15	0	2	0	2	0	19	0
15	MF	Jakob Johansson	27	5	8	1	2	0	37	6
16	DF	Erik Lund	0	0	0	0	0	0	0	0
17	FW	Sam Larsson	29	4	8	1	2	0	39	5
18	MF	Darijan Bojanić	7	1	2	1	0	0	9	2
19	FW	Hannes Stiller	23	1	6	0	0	0	29	1
21	MF	Pontus Farnerud	21	1	2	0	1	0	24	1
22	DF	Adam Johansson	27	0	3	0	2	0	32	0
23	FW	Gustav Engvall	3	0	0	0	1	0	4	0
24	DF	Mikael Dyrestam	23	0	6	0	2	0	31	0
26	MF	Hampus Zackrisson	1	0	0	0	0	0	1	0
27	MF	Joel Allansson	3	0	4	1	0	0	7	1
30	DF	Mattias Bjärsmyr	20	1	8	0	0	0	28	1
38	MF	Karl Bohm	1	0	0	0	0	0	1	0
Players that left the club during the season
8	MF	Nordin Gerzić	11	0	1	0	0	0	12	0
26	FW	David Moberg Karlsson	10	2	5	2	0	0	15	4

=== Disciplinary record ===
N	P	Nat.	Name	Allsvenskan			Svenska Cupen; Svenska Supercupen			UEFA Europa League			Total			Notes
N	P	Nat.	Name	Yellow card	Second yellow card	Red card	Yellow card	Second yellow card	Red card	Yellow card	Second yellow card	Red card	Yellow card	Second yellow card	Red card	Notes
1	GK	(Sweden)	John Alvbåge	1			1						2			
4	DF	(Norway)	Kjetil Wæhler	3									3			
5	MF	(Sweden)	Philip Haglund	5	1		3						8	1		
6	DF	(Sweden)	Ludwig Augustinsson	1									1			
7	FW	(Sweden)	Tobias Hysén	1									1			
9	MF	(Denmark)	Lasse Vibe	1									1			
10	MF	(Brazil)	Daniel Sobralense	2			1						3			
11	FW	(Sweden)	Robin Söder	1									1			
14	DF	(Iceland)	Hjálmar Jónsson	2						1			3			
15	MF	(Sweden)	Jakob Johansson	6		1	1						7		1	
17	FW	(Sweden)	Sam Larsson	1									1			
18	MF	(Sweden)	Darijan Bojanić	2									2			
19	FW	(Sweden)	Hannes Stiller	1									1			
22	DF	(Sweden)	Adam Johansson	4						1			5			
23	FW	(Sweden)	Gustav Engvall	1									1			
24	DF	(Sweden)	Mikael Dyrestam	1									1			
26	FW	(Sweden)	David Moberg Karlsson	1									1			
30	DF	(Sweden)	Mattias Bjärsmyr	4			1						5			

Source: ifkgoteborg.se
Only competitive matches
(yellow card) = Number of bookings; (second yellow card) = Number of sending offs after a second yellow card; (red card) = Number of sending offs by a direct red card.

== Club ==
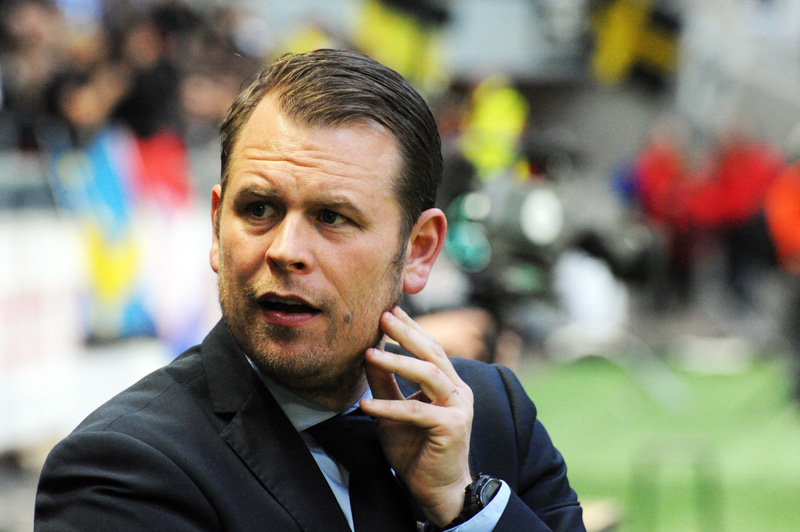
The 2013 season was Mikael Stahre's second season with IFK Göteborg.

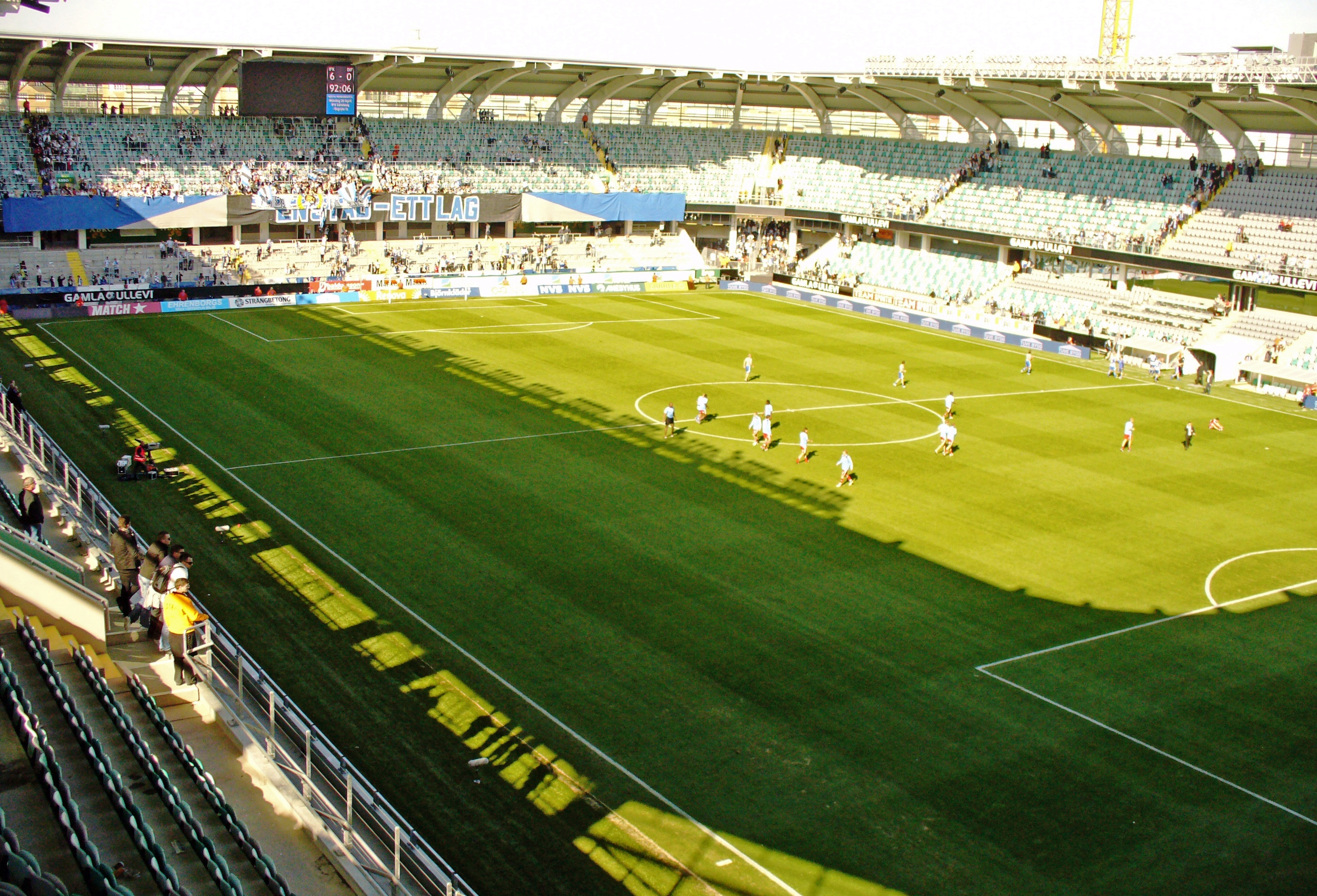
Gamla Ullevi was the fourth largest stadium in Allsvenskan in 2013.

=== Coaching staff ===
Name	Role
(Sweden) Mikael Stahre	Head coach
(Sweden) Magnus Edlund	Assistant coach / U21 head coach
(Sweden) Roland Kaldéus	Fitness coach
(Sweden) Stefan Remnér	Goalkeeping coach
(Sweden) Fredrik Larsson	Physiotherapist
(Sweden) Tim Rahmquist	Physiotherapist
(Sweden) Jon Karlsson	Club doctor
(Sweden) Leif Swärd	Club doctor
(Sweden) Lennart Sugiardjo	Club doctor
(Sweden) Johan Örtendahl	Mental coach
(Sweden) Bertil Lundqvist	Equipment manager
(Sweden) Alf Westerberg	U21 assistant coach / U19 head coach
(Sweden) Thomas Olsson	U19 assistant coach
(Sweden) Roger Gustafsson	Head coach youth academy
(Sweden) Olle Sultan	Head scout

=== Other information ===
Chairman	(Sweden) Bertil Rignäs
Club director	(Sweden) Martin Kurzwelly
Director of sports	(Sweden) Håkan Mild
Ground (capacity and dimensions)	Gamla Ullevi (18,900 / 105x68 m)

Source: IFK Göteborg and Gamla Ullevi

== Competitions ==
=== Overall ===
Competition	Started round	Final position / round	First match	Last match
Allsvenskan	N/A	3rd	31 March 2013	3 November 2013
Svenska Cupen	Round 2	Winners	20 August 2012	26 May 2013
Svenska Supercupen	Final	Runners-up	10 November 2013	
UEFA Europa League	Second qualifying round	Second qualifying round	18 July 2013	25 July 2013

Source: Competitions

=== Allsvenskan ===
==== League table ====
Pos	Team	Pld	W	D	L	GF	GA	GD	Pts	Qualification or relegation
1	Malmö FF (C)	30	19	6	5	56	30	+26	63	Qualification to Champions League second qualifying round
2	AIK	30	17	7	6	54	32	+22	58	Qualification to Europa League second qualifying round
3	IFK Göteborg	30	16	6	8	49	31	+18	54	Qualification to Europa League first qualifying round
4	Kalmar FF	30	14	10	6	35	26	+9	52	
5	Helsingborgs IF	30	14	7	9	61	41	+20	49	

Source: svenskfotboll.se (in Swedish)
Rules for classification: 1) points; 2) goal difference; 3) number of goals scored.
(C) Champions

==== Results summary ====
Overall								Home						Away					
Pld	W	D	L	GF	GA	GD	Pts	W	D	L	GF	GA	GD	W	D	L	GF	GA	GD
30	16	6	8	49	31	+18	54	11	3	1	31	11	+20	5	3	7	18	20	−2

Source: svenskfotboll.se (in Swedish)

==== Results by round ====
Round	1	2	3	4	5	6	7	8	9	10	11	12	13	14	15	16	17	18	19	20	21	22	23	24	25	26	27	28	29	30
Ground	A	H	A	H	A	H	A	H	H	A	A	H	A	H	A	A	H	H	A	H	A	H	A	H	H	A	A	H	A	H
Result	W	W	D	W	W	D	L	W	W	D	L	D	W	W	D	L	L	W	W	W	L	W	W	W	W	L	L	D	L	W
Position	2	1	1	1	1	1	3	2	2	2	3	3	3	2	2	4	4	4	4	3	4	4	3	2	2	2	2	3	3	3

Source: see below
A = Away; H = Home; W = Win; D = Draw; L = Loss

==== Matches ====
Kickoff times are in UTC+2 unless stated otherwise.

31 March 2013 Round 1	BK Häcken	0–3	IFK Göteborg	Gothenburg
15:00		Report	J. Johansson 22'; Bjärsmyr 40'; Larsson 65'	Stadium: Ullevi; Attendance: 15,593; Referee: Stefan Johannesson (Täby)

7 April 2013 Round 2	IFK Göteborg	2–0	IF Brommapojkarna	Gothenburg
15:00	Haglund 27'; Moberg Karlsson 64'	Report		Stadium: Gamla Ullevi; Attendance: 11,782; Referee: Andreas Ekberg (Lund)

15 April 2013 Round 3	IF Elfsborg	0–0	IFK Göteborg	Borås
19:05		Report		Stadium: Borås Arena; Attendance: 15,995; Referee: Martin Hansson (Holmsjö)

18 April 2013 Round 4	IFK Göteborg	2–0	Syrianska FC	Gothenburg
19:00	Hysén 32', 57'	Report		Stadium: Gamla Ullevi; Attendance: 7,677; Referee: Michael Lerjéus (Skövde)

21 April 2013 Round 5	Åtvidabergs FF	1–2	IFK Göteborg	Åtvidaberg
15:00	Möller 89'	Report	Haglund 55'; Stiller 68'	Stadium: Kopparvallen; Attendance: 5,105; Referee: Martin Strömbergsson (Gävle)

25 April 2013 Round 6	IFK Göteborg	1–1	Malmö FF	Gothenburg
18:30	Larsson 90+4'	Report	Rantie 29'	Stadium: Gamla Ullevi; Attendance: 17,063; Referee: Jonas Eriksson (Sigtuna)

6 May 2013 Round 7	AIK	3–1	IFK Göteborg	Solna
19:05	Igboananike 31'; Borges 49'; Kayongo-Mutumba 80'	Report	Haglund 24' (pen.)	Stadium: Friends Arena; Attendance: 24,211; Referee: Stefan Johannesson (Täby)

11 May 2013 Round 8	IFK Göteborg	1–0	Halmstads BK	Gothenburg
16:00	Hysén 27'	Report		Stadium: Gamla Ullevi; Attendance: 12,457; Referee: Martin Hansson (Holmsjö)

19 May 2013 Round 9	IFK Göteborg	2–0	Kalmar FF	Gothenburg
17:30	Hysén 38', 82'	Report		Stadium: Gamla Ullevi; Attendance: 10,045; Referee: Markus Strömbergsson (Gävle)

22 May 2013 Round 10	Gefle IF	1–1	IFK Göteborg	Gävle
19:00	Orlov 74'	Report	Moberg Karlsson 31'	Stadium: Strömvallen; Attendance: 4,067; Referee: Mohammed Al-Hakim (Köping)

31 May 2013 Round 11	Östers IF	2–0	IFK Göteborg	Växjö
19:00	Vasilj 62'; Zlojutro 73'	Report		Stadium: Myresjöhus Arena; Attendance: 7,100; Referee: Michael Lerjéus (Skövde)

17 June 2013 Round 12	IFK Göteborg	0–0	Djurgårdens IF	Gothenburg
19:05		Report		Stadium: Gamla Ullevi; Attendance: 11,304; Referee: Martin Hansson (Holmsjö)

20 June 2013 Round 13	IFK Norrköping	1–2	IFK Göteborg	Norrköping
19:05	Þorvaldsson 71'	Report	Haglund 11'; Söder 69'	Stadium: Nya Parken; Attendance: 7,790; Referee: Markus Strömbergsson (Gävle)

24 June 2013 Round 14	IFK Göteborg	4–2	Mjällby AIF	Gothenburg
19:00	Hysén 29', 44'; Haglund 32'; Söder 89'	Report	Haynes 9'; Jónsson 47' (o.g.)	Stadium: Gamla Ullevi; Attendance: 8,594; Referee: Johan Hamlin (Bro)

8 July 2013 Round 15	Helsingborgs IF	1–1	IFK Göteborg	Helsingborg
19:07	Simović 71'	Report	Söder 42'	Stadium: Olympia; Attendance: 14,413; Referee: Stefan Johannesson (Täby)

13 July 2013 Round 16	IF Brommapojkarna	2–1	IFK Göteborg	Stockholm
16:00	Albornoz 10'; G. Sandberg Magnusson 24'	Report	Söder 62'	Stadium: Grimsta IP; Attendance: 1,771; Referee: Martin Strömbergsson (Gävle)

28 July 2013 Round 17	IFK Göteborg	2–4	Helsingborgs IF	Gothenburg
19:00	Söder 22'; Hysén 26'	Report	Sadiku 42'; Accam 45', 90+2'; Lindström 52'	Stadium: Gamla Ullevi; Attendance: 14,712; Referee: Jonas Eriksson (Sigtuna)

4 August 2013 Round 18	IFK Göteborg	3–1	BK Häcken	Gothenburg
17:30	Hysén 38'; Söder 39'; J. Johansson 69'	Report	El Kabir 3'	Stadium: Gamla Ullevi; Attendance: 11,118; Referee: Andreas Ekberg (Lund)

11 August 2013 Round 19	Syrianska FC	0–2	IFK Göteborg	Södertälje
15:00		Report	Hysén 31'; Farnerud 72'	Stadium: Södertälje Fotbollsarena; Attendance: 2,301; Referee: Martin Strömbergsson (Gävle)

17 August 2013 Round 20	IFK Göteborg	3–1	IF Elfsborg	Gothenburg
16:00	Hysén 49', 90+6'; J. Johansson 59'	Report	Ishizaki 73' (pen.)	Stadium: Gamla Ullevi; Attendance: 16,027; Referee: Martin Hansson (Holmsjö)

25 August 2013 Round 21	Malmö FF	3–1	IFK Göteborg	Malmö
17:30	Jansson 20'; Forsberg 45'; Hamad 75'	Report	Söder 17'	Stadium: Swedbank Stadion; Attendance: 23,142; Referee: Jonas Eriksson (Sigtuna)

1 September 2013 Round 22	IFK Göteborg	3–0	Åtvidabergs FF	Gothenburg
15:00	Wæhler 12', 52'; Vibe 76'	Report		Stadium: Gamla Ullevi; Attendance: 7,131; Referee: Martin Strömbergsson (Gävle)

15 September 2013 Round 23	Halmstads BK	0–1	IFK Göteborg	Halmstad
15:00		Report	Larsson 90+1'	Stadium: Örjans Vall; Attendance: 6,540; Referee: Markus Strömbergsson (Gävle)

23 September 2013 Round 24	IFK Göteborg	3–1	AIK	Gothenburg
19:05	Hysén 30'; Söder 62'; Haglund 90' (pen.)	Report	Johansson 84'	Stadium: Gamla Ullevi; Attendance: 16,206; Referee: Michael Lerjéus (Skövde)

26 September 2013 Round 25	IFK Göteborg	3–1	Gefle IF	Gothenburg
19:00	J. Johansson 10'; Haglund 24'; Larsson 29'	Report	Orlov 39'	Stadium: Gamla Ullevi; Attendance: 10,489; Referee: Tobias Mattsson (Karlstad)

29 September 2013 Round 26	Kalmar FF	2–1	IFK Göteborg	Kalmar
15:00	Holmvik 60'; Elm 68'	Report	Hysén 79'	Stadium: Guldfågeln Arena; Attendance: 6,836; Referee: Andreas Ekberg (Lund)

6 October 2013 Round 27	Djurgårdens IF	2–1	IFK Göteborg	Stockholm
15:00	Broberg 50'; Jawo 90+6' (pen.)	Report	J. Johansson 45'	Stadium: Tele2 Arena; Attendance: 11,815; Referee: Stefan Johannesson (Täby)

20 October 2013 Round 28	IFK Göteborg	0–0	Östers IF	Gothenburg
15:00		Report		Stadium: Gamla Ullevi; Attendance: 9,107; Referee: Tobias Mattsson (Karlstad)

27 October 2013 Round 29	Mjällby AIF	2–1	IFK Göteborg	Hällevik
15:00 UTC+1	Haynes 7'; Henderson 45+2'	Report	Söder 56'	Stadium: Strandvallen; Attendance: 4,038; Referee: Markus Strömbergsson (Gävle)

3 November 2013 Round 30	IFK Göteborg	2–0	IFK Norrköping	Gothenburg
15:00 UTC+1	Bojanić 54'; Vibe 71'	Report		Stadium: Gamla Ullevi; Attendance: 10,119; Referee: Martin Hansson (Holmsjö)

=== Svenska Cupen ===
==== 2012–13 ====
The tournament continued from the 2012 season.

Kickoff times are in UTC+1 unless stated otherwise.

===== Group stage =====
Pos	Team	Pld	W	D	L	GF	GA	GD	Pts	Qualification	IFKG	KFF	IKB	NBIS
1	IFK Göteborg	3	2	0	1	6	2	+4	6	Advance to Knockout stage	—	0–1	2–0	—
2	Kalmar FF	3	2	0	1	5	2	+3	6		—	—	3–0	—
3	IK Brage	3	1	0	2	3	6	−3	3		—	—	—	3–1
4	Nyköpings BIS	3	1	0	2	4	8	−4	3		1–4	2–1	—	—

2 March 2013 Matchday 1	IFK Göteborg	2–0	IK Brage	Gothenburg
16:00	Hysén 3', 73'	Report		Stadium: Valhalla IP; Attendance: 2,118; Referee: Michael Lerjéus (Skövde)

10 March 2013 Matchday 2	Nyköpings BIS	1–4	IFK Göteborg	Nyköping
15:00	Funes 23'	Report	Hysén 8' (pen.), 75', 82'; Allansson 87'	Stadium: Rosvalla IP; Attendance: 1,428; Referee: Magnus Ahlsén (Linköping)

17 March 2013 Matchday 3	IFK Göteborg	0–1	Kalmar FF	Gothenburg
16:00		Report	Romário 66'	Stadium: Valhalla IP; Attendance: 1,838; Referee: Martin Strömbergsson (Gävle)

===== Knockout stage =====
3 April 2013 Quarter-finals	Helsingborgs IF	0–1	IFK Göteborg	Helsingborg
18:00 UTC+2		Report	Haglund 4'	Stadium: Olympia; Attendance: 4,031; Referee: Tobias Mattsson (Karlstad)

1 May 2013 Semi-finals	Östers IF	1–4	IFK Göteborg	Växjö
13:30 UTC+2	Robledo 51'	Report	Hysén 9', 52'; Moberg Karlsson 69', 81'	Stadium: Myresjöhus Arena; Attendance: 6,500; Referee: Michael Lerjéus (Skövde)

26 May 2013 Final	Djurgårdens IF	1–1 (a.e.t.) (1–3 p)	IFK Göteborg	Solna
17:00 UTC+2	Amartey 52'	Report	Hysén 6'	Stadium: Friends Arena; Attendance: 21,819; Referee: Stefan Johannesson (Täby)
	Penalties
	Jawo (penalty missed); Johansson (penalty scored); Solignac (penalty missed); Nymann (penalty missed)		(penalty scored) Haglund; (penalty missed) Bjärsmyr; (penalty scored) Dyrestam; (penalty scored) Farnerud

==== 2013–14 ====
The tournament continued into the 2014 season.

===== Qualification stage =====
22 August 2013 Round 2	Lunds BK	0–4	IFK Göteborg	Lund
19:00 UTC+2		Report	Vibe 7'; Larsson 42'; J. Johansson 50'; Bojanić 86'	Stadium: Klostergårdens IP; Attendance: 2,030; Referee: Kristoffer Karlsson (Helsingborg)

=== Svenska Supercupen ===
10 November 2013 Final	Malmö FF	3–2	IFK Göteborg	Malmö
18:00 UTC+1	Forsberg 42', 48'; Molins 90'	Report	Haglund 45'; Vibe 55'	Stadium: Swedbank Stadion; Attendance: 2,787; Referee: Andreas Ekberg (Lund)

=== UEFA Europa League ===
Kickoff times are in UTC+2.

==== Qualifying phase and play-off round ====
===== Second qualifying round =====
18 July 2013 First leg	IFK Göteborg (Sweden)	0–0	(Slovakia) Trenčín	Helsingborg, Sweden
19:00		Report		Stadium: Olympia; Attendance: 4,282; Referee: Paolo Silvio Mazzoleni (Italy)

25 July 2013 Second leg	Trenčín (Slovakia)	2–1 (2–1 agg.)	(Sweden) IFK Göteborg	Dubnica nad Váhom, Slovakia
17:00	Adi 15', 71'	Report	Haglund 82'	Stadium: Mestský štadión Attendance: 4,150; Referee: Artur Soares Dias (Portugal)

== Non-competitive ==
=== Pre-season ===
Kickoff times are in UTC+1.

25 January 2013 Copa del Sol; Group stage	Shakhtar Donetsk (Ukraine)	2–1	(Sweden) IFK Göteborg	La Manga, Spain
19:00	Rakytskiy 61'; Taison 85'	Report	Moberg Karlsson 72'	Stadium: La Manga Stadium; Attendance: 450; Referee: Ken Henry Johnsen (Norway)

28 January 2013 Copa del Sol; Group stage	Olimpija (Slovenia)	0–0 (3–2 p)	(Sweden) IFK Göteborg	La Manga, Spain
13:00		Report		Stadium: La Manga Stadium; Attendance: 100; Referee: Ransin Djurhuus (Faroe Islands)
	Penalties
	Salkić (penalty scored); Trifković (penalty missed); Božič (penalty scored); Delamea (penalty scored)		(penalty scored) Hysén; (penalty scored) Gerzić; (penalty missed) Sobralense; (penalty missed) Augustinsson; (penalty missed) Bjärsmyr

31 January 2013 Copa del Sol; Group stage	Strømsgodset IF (Norway)	0–3	(Sweden) IFK Göteborg	La Manga, Spain
13:00		Report	Haglund 28'; Hysén 33'; Söder 90+3'	Stadium: La Manga Stadium; Attendance: 100; Referee: Mattias Gestranius (Finland)

9 February 2013 Friendly	IFK Göteborg (Sweden)	1–0	(Denmark) SønderjyskE	Gothenburg, Sweden
12:30	Wæhler 62'	Report		Stadium: Valhalla IP; Attendance: 2,391; Referee: Magnus Lindgren (Gothenburg)

16 February 2013 Friendly	IFK Göteborg (Sweden)	5–1	(Norway) Fredrikstad FK	Gothenburg, Sweden
14:00	Hysén 40', 68' (pen.), 80'; Larsson 52'; Gerzić 59'	Report	Stene 50'	Stadium: Valhalla IP; Attendance: 2,052; Referee: Daniel Stålhammar (Landskrona)

23 February 2013 Friendly	IFK Göteborg	2–0	Örgryte IS	Gothenburg, Sweden
14:00	Bjärsmyr 50'; Stiller 82'	Report		Stadium: Valhalla IP; Attendance: 3,887; Referee: Bojan Pandžić (Gothenburg)
