= 2010 IFK Göteborg season =

IFK Göteborg
2010 season
- Manager: Jonas Olsson
- Allsvenskan: 7th
- Europa League: 3rd Qualifying round
- Svenska Cupen: Last 16
- Supercupen: Final
- Top goalscorer: Tobias Hysén (10)

IFK Göteborg finished just 7th in Allsvenskan. Just managing to finish on the top half of the table. Starting the season with a loss in Supercupen to AIK, and was then briefly involved in a relegation battle, until the World Cup break offered the squad to regroup and had a stronger autumn season.

== Squad ==
=== Goalkeepers ===
- (Sweden) August Strömberg
- (Sweden) Erik Dahlin
- (Sweden) Markus Sandberg

=== Defenders ===
- (Sweden) Karl Svensson
- (Sweden) Nicklas Carlsson
- (Sweden) Petter Björlund
- (Sweden) Adam Johansson
- (Iceland) Ragnar Sigurðsson
- (Iceland) Hjálmar Jónsson
- (Sweden) Erik Lund
- (Sweden) Sebastian Eriksson
- (Sweden) Mikael Dyrestam

=== Midfielders ===
- (Sweden) Thomas Olsson
- (Sweden) Stefan Selaković
- (Sweden) Jakob Johansson
- (Sweden) Tobias Sana
- (Iceland) Teddy Bjarnason
- (Sweden) Pär Ericsson

=== Attackers ===
- (Sweden) Tobias Hysén
- (Sweden) Robin Söder
- (Sweden) Hannes Stiller
- (Sweden) Niklas Bärkroth

== Competitions ==
=== Allsvenskan ===
==== League table ====
Pos	Team	Pld	W	D	L	GF	GA	GD	Pts	Qualification or relegation
5	Trelleborgs FF	30	13	5	12	39	42	−3	44	
6	Mjällby AIF	30	11	10	9	36	29	+7	43	
7	IFK Göteborg	30	10	10	10	42	29	+13	40	
8	BK Häcken	30	11	7	12	40	42	−2	40	Qualification to Europa League first qualifying round (Note: Sweden was among the best three associations in the UEFA Fair Play ranking and thus received an additional spot in the first qualifying round of the Europa League, Häcken received the qualifying spot for their ranking in Allsvenskans Fair Play ranking.)
9	Kalmar FF	30	10	10	10	36	38	−2	40	

Source: svenskfotboll.se (in Swedish)
Rules for classification: 1) points; 2) goal difference; 3) number of goals scored.

==== Matches ====
13 March 2010 1	Kalmar FF	0–3	IFK Göteborg
			Hysén 29', 47'; Jónsson 67'

22 March 2010 2	IFK Göteborg	0–1	Häcken
			Vinícius 83'

29 March 2010 3	Helsingborg	2–0	IFK Göteborg
	Lindström 29'; Nilsson 37'

6 April 2010 4	IFK Göteborg	1–1	Djurgården
	Johansson 57'		Hellquist 16'

11 April 2010 5	IFK Göteborg	1–1	Brommapojkarna
	Ericsson 7'		Chhadeh 37'

15 April 2010 6	Trelleborg	2–1	IFK Göteborg
	Drugge 2'; Adelstam 27'		Olsson 54'

18 April 2010 7	IFK Göteborg	5–1	Elfsborg
	Eriksson 20'; Jónsson 41'; Johansson 81', 87'; Söder 90'		M. Ericsson 5'

24 April 2010 8	Åtvidaberg	2–1	IFK Göteborg
	Eboagwu 58'; Arvidsson 87'		Söder 71'

29 April 2010 9	IFK Göteborg	0–2	Malmö FF
			Larsson 21'; Molins 69'

3 May 2010 10	Mjällby	0–0	IFK Göteborg

6 May 2010 11	IFK Göteborg	4–0	AIK
	Olsson 37', 52'; Söder 60'; Bjarnason 72'

10 May 2010 12	GAIS	0–0	IFK Göteborg

13 May 2010 13	IFK Göteborg	0–0	Örebro

16 May 2010 14	Gefle	0–0	IFK Göteborg

17 July 2010 15	IFK Göteborg	3–0	Halmstad
	Hysén 10'; G. Svensson 66'; Sigurðsson 69'

25 July 2010 16	Halmstad	1–0	IFK Göteborg
	Rosén 41'

1 August 2010 17	IFK Göteborg	3–1	Kalmar FF
	Stiller 11'; Hysén 33', 36'		Douglas 69'

8 August 2010 18	Häcken	1–5	IFK Göteborg
	Henriksson 4'		Selaković 11', 64', 87'; Stiller 32'; Bjarnason 58'

15 August 2010 19	IFK Göteborg	0–0	Helsingborg

22 August 2010 20	Djurgården	2–0	IFK Göteborg
	Hellquist 34'; Igboananike 89'

29 August 2010 21	AIK	1–2	IFK Göteborg
	M. Bangura 90'		Bjarnason 7'; Bärkroth 78'

13 September 2010 22	IFK Göteborg	2–1	GAIS
	Stiller 15'; Hysén 85'		B. Andersson 63'

19 September 2010 23	IFK Göteborg	3–0	Åtvidaberg
	Johansson 61'; Bjarnason 62'; Hysén 86'

22 September 2010 24	Elfsborg	1–1	IFK Göteborg
	Jönsson 54'		Hysén 5'

26 September 2010 25	Malmö FF	2–1	IFK Göteborg
	D. Andersson 39'; Larsson 65'		Hysén 81'

3 October 2010 26	IFK Göteborg	0–0	Mjällby

17 October 2010 27	Brommapojkarna	1–2	IFK Göteborg
	Guterstam 14'		Selaković 13'; Atashkadeh 83'

25 October 2010 28	IFK Göteborg	1–2	Trelleborg
	Hysén 31'		Nilsson 54'; Pode 84'

1 November 2010 29	Örebro	2–1	IFK Göteborg
	Ajdarević 65'; Gerzić 90'		Selaković 90+'

7 November 2010 30	IFK Göteborg	2–2	Gefle
	Johansson 13'; Sana 20'		Orlov 57'; Kapčević 87'
