= 2012 Copa del Sol =

Tournament details
- Country: Spain
- Dates: 28 January – 7 February
- Teams: 12

Final positions
- Champions: (Russia) Spartak Moscow
- Runners-up: (Denmark) Copenhagen

Tournament statistics
- Matches played: 19
- Goals scored: 50 (2.63 per match)
- Top goal scorer: (Brazil) Welliton (Spartak Moscow) (3 goals)

The 2012 Copa del Sol took place in Benidorm and La Manga, Spain between 28 January and 7 February 2012. Unlike last years edition, the format of the competition will be played as a group stage.

== Group stage ==
=== Benidorm Group ===
Pos	Team	Pld	W	PKW	PKL	L	GF	GA	GD	Pts
1	(Russia) Spartak Moscow	3	1	1	1	0	6	3	+3	6
2	(Norway) Molde	3	2	0	0	1	4	5	−1	6
3	(Slovenia) Olimpija	3	1	1	0	1	7	3	+4	5
4	(Sweden) Göteborg	3	1	0	2	0	4	3	+1	5
5	(Norway) Rosenborg	3	1	1	0	1	4	3	+1	5
6	(China) Dalian Aerbin	3	0	0	0	3	2	10	−8	0

28 January 2012
13:00 CET

Molde (Norway)	2–1	(Slovenia) Olimpija
Berget 24'; Tripić 81'	Report	Nikezić 78'

Estadio Municipal Guillermo Amor, Benidorm
Attendance: 200
Referee: Martin Hansson (Sweden)

28 January 2012
16:00 CET

Dalian Aerbin (China)	1–3	(Norway) Rosenborg
Wang Hongyou 6'	Report	Prica 35' (pen.); Dočkal 61', 64'

Estadio Municipal Guillermo Amor, Benidorm
Attendance: 200
Referee: Daniel Stålhammar (Sweden)

28 January 2012
19:00 CET

Göteborg (Sweden)	2–2	(Russia) Spartak Moscow
Hysén 36'; Haglund 65'	Report	Welliton 39'; Emenike 69'
Penalties
Hysén (penalty missed); Sobralense (penalty scored); Allansson (penalty scored); Valgarðsson (penalty missed)	2–4	(penalty missed) Parshivlyuk; (penalty scored) McGeady; (penalty scored) Ananidze; (penalty scored) Rojo; (penalty scored) Ari

Estadio Municipal Guillermo Amor, Benidorm
Attendance: 300
Referee: Espen Berntsen (Norway)

31 January 2012
19:00 CET

Göteborg (Sweden)	1–1	(Slovenia) Olimpija
Dyrestam 51'	Report	Djermanović 4'
Penalties
Selaković (penalty missed); Hysén (penalty scored); Salomonsson (penalty scored); Jónsson (penalty scored)	3–5	(penalty scored) Sretenović; (penalty scored) Vršič; (penalty scored) Fink; (penalty scored) Anđelkovič; (penalty scored) Ivelja

Estadio Municipal Guillermo Amor, Benidorm
Attendance: 100
Referee: Dag Vidar Hafsas (Norway)

1 February 2012
16:00 CET

Dalian Aerbin (China)	1–2	(Norway) Molde
Wang Jun 48'	Report	Tripić 72'; Chima 81'

Estadio Municipal Guillermo Amor, Benidorm
Attendance: 200
Referee: Daniel Stålhammar (Sweden)

1 February 2012
19:00 CET

Spartak Moscow (Russia)	1–1	(Norway) Rosenborg
Emenike 66'	Report	Chibuike 90'
Penalties
de Zeeuw (penalty scored); Carioca (penalty scored); Kombarov (penalty scored); Rodri (penalty scored); Bilyaletdinov (penalty scored); Pareja (penalty scored); Bryzgalov (penalty scored); Welliton (penalty scored); Kudryashov (penalty missed)	8–9	(penalty scored) Prica; (penalty scored) Dočkal; (penalty scored) Chibuike; (penalty scored) Selnæs; (penalty scored) Høiland; (penalty scored) Larsen; (penalty scored) Svensson; (penalty scored) Dorsin; (penalty scored) Henriksen

Estadio Municipal Guillermo Amor, Benidorm
Attendance: 300
Referee: Martin Hansson (Sweden)

4 February 2012
13:00 CET

Olimpija (Slovenia)	5–0	(China) Dalian Aerbin
Radujko 17'; Bešić 59'; Vršič 62'; Nikezić 64'; Valenčič 83'	Report

Estadio Municipal Guillermo Amor, Benidorm
Attendance: 100
Referee: Dagfinn Forná (Faroe Islands)

4 February 2012
16:00 CET

Spartak Moscow (Russia)	3–0	(Norway) Molde
Dzyuba 18'; Welliton 41', 46'	Report

Estadio Municipal Guillermo Amor, Benidorm
Attendance: 200
Referee: Mattias Gestranius (Finland)

4 February 2012
19:00 CET

Rosenborg (Norway)	0–1	(Sweden) Göteborg
	Report	Sobralense 50'

Estadio Municipal Guillermo Amor, Benidorm
Attendance: 200
Referee: Kristinn Jakobsson (Iceland)

=== La Manga Group ===
Pos	Team	Pld	W	PKW	PKL	L	GF	GA	GD	Pts
1	(Denmark) Copenhagen	3	2	0	1	0	4	1	+3	7
2	(Russia) Anzhi	3	1	2	0	0	4	3	+1	7
3	(Ukraine) Shakhtar Donetsk	3	1	1	0	1	3	4	−1	5
4	(Norway) Aalesund	3	1	0	1	1	7	7	0	4
5	(Sweden) Kalmar	3	1	0	0	2	4	4	0	3
6	(Norway) Tromsø	3	0	0	1	2	0	3	−3	1

29 January 2012
19:00 CET

Kalmar (Sweden)	0–1	(Denmark) Copenhagen
	Report	Santin 45' (pen.)

La Manga Stadium, La Manga
Attendance: 200
Referee: Dag Vidar Hafsas (Norway)

30 January 2012
16:00 CET

Tromsø (Norway)	0–0	(Russia) Anzhi
	Report
Penalties
Björck (penalty missed); Mbodj (penalty scored); Ciss (penalty missed); Andersen (penalty scored)	2–4	(penalty missed) Eto'o; (penalty scored) Roberto Carlos; (penalty scored) Prudnikov; (penalty scored) João Carlos; (penalty scored) Jucilei

La Manga Stadium, La Manga
Attendance: 200
Referee: Anders Poulsen (Denmark)

30 January 2012
19:00 CET

Shakhtar Donetsk (Ukraine)	2–2	(Norway) Aalesund
Fernandinho 6'; Seleznyov 66'	Report	Myklebust 39'; Arnefjord 50'
Penalties
Fernandinho (penalty scored); Srna (penalty scored); Gai (penalty scored); Seleznyov (penalty scored); Eduardo (penalty scored)	5–3	(penalty scored) Ulvestad; (penalty missed) Barrantes; (penalty scored) Arnefjord; (penalty scored) Sylling Olsen

La Manga Stadium, La Manga
Attendance: 200
Referee: Mads Kristoffersen (Denmark)

2 February 2012
13:00 CET

Aalesund (Norway)	3–2	(Sweden) Kalmar
Barrantes 39'; Ulvestad 65' (pen.); Morrison 86'	Report	Diouf 21'; Israelsson 66'

La Manga Stadium, La Manga
Attendance: 100
Referee: Anders Poulsen (Denmark)

2 February 2012
16:00 CET

Copenhagen (Denmark)	1–1	(Russia) Anzhi
Abdellaoue 78'	Report	Eto'o 32' (pen.)
Penalties
Bengtsson (penalty scored); Stadsgaard (penalty missed); Grindheim (penalty missed); Kristensen (penalty scored)	2–4	(penalty scored) Eto'o; (penalty scored) Ahmedov; (penalty scored) Mukhammad; (penalty scored) João Carlos

La Manga Stadium, La Manga
Attendance: 200
Referee: Espen Berntsen (Norway)

2 February 2012
19:00 CET

Tromsø (Norway)	0–1	(Ukraine) Shakhtar Donetsk
	Report	Eduardo 25'

La Manga Stadium, La Manga
Attendance: 200
Referee: Mads Kristoffersen (Denmark)

5 February 2012
13:00 CET

Anzhi (Russia)	3–2	(Norway) Aalesund
Ivanov 11'; Eto'o 42'; Arnefjord 90' (o.g.)	Report	James 50'; Lakhiyalov 78' (o.g.)

La Manga Stadium, La Manga
Attendance: 200
Referee: Antti Munukka (Finland)

5 February 2012
16:00 CET

Tromsø (Norway)	0–2	(Sweden) Kalmar
	Report	Mendes 32'; Söderqvist 90+1'

La Manga Stadium, La Manga
Attendance: 200
Referee: Kristinn Jakobsson (Iceland)

5 February 2012
19:00 CET

Copenhagen (Denmark)	2–0	(Ukraine) Shakhtar Donetsk
N'Doye 24'; Kristensen 79'	Report

La Manga Stadium, La Manga
Attendance: 300
Referee: Petur Reinert (Faroe Islands)

== Final ==
7 February 2012
19:00 CET

Spartak Moscow (Russia)	1–0	(Denmark) Copenhagen
Pareja 33'	Report

Estadio Cartagonova, Cartagena
Attendance: 4000
Referee: Kristinn Jakobsson (Iceland)

== Winners ==
FC Spartak Moscow

== Goalscorers ==
3 goals

- (Brazil) Welliton (Spartak Moscow)

2 goals

- (Cameroon) Samuel Eto'o (Anzhi)
- (Norway) Zlatko Tripić (Molde)
- (Montenegro) Nikola Nikezić (Olimpija)
- (Czech Republic) Bořek Dočkal (Rosenborg)
- (Nigeria) Emmanuel Emenike (Spartak Moscow)

1 goals

- (Sweden) Daniel Arnefjord (Aalesund)
- (Costa Rica) Michael Barrantes (Aalesund)
- (Nigeria) Leke James (Aalesund)
- (Jamaica) Jason Morrison (Aalesund)
- (Norway) Christian Myklebust (Aalesund)
- (Norway) Fredrik Ulvestad (Aalesund)
- (Russia) Aleksei Ivanov (Anzhi)
- (Norway) Mos Abdellaoue (Copenhagen)
- (Denmark) Thomas Kristensen (Copenhagen)
- (Senegal) Dame N'Doye (Copenhagen)
- (Brazil) César Santin (Copenhagen)
- (China) Wang Hongyou (Dalian Aerbin)
- (China) Wang Jun (Dalian Aerbin)
- (Sweden) Mikael Dyrestam (Göteborg)
- (Sweden) Philip Haglund (Göteborg)
- (Sweden) Tobias Hysén (Göteborg)
- (Brazil) Daniel Sobralense (Göteborg)
- (Senegal) Papa Diouf (Kalmar)
- (Sweden) Erik Israelsson (Kalmar)
- (Brazil) Daniel Mendes (Kalmar)
- (Sweden) Måns Söderqvist (Kalmar)
- (Norway) Jo Inge Berget (Molde)
- (Nigeria) Daniel Chima Chukwu (Molde)
- (Slovenia) Adnan Bešić (Olimpija)
- (Slovenia) Dejan Djermanović (Olimpija)
- (Slovenia) Dalibor Radujko (Olimpija)
- (Slovenia) Filip Valenčič (Olimpija)
- (Slovenia) Dare Vršič (Olimpija)
- (Nigeria) John Chibuike (Rosenborg)
- (Sweden) Rade Prica (Rosenborg)
- (Croatia) Eduardo (Shakhtar Donetsk)
- (Brazil) Fernandinho (Shakhtar Donetsk)
- (Ukraine) Yevhen Seleznyov (Shakhtar Donetsk)
- (Russia) Artyom Dzyuba (Spartak Moscow)
- (Argentina) Nicolás Pareja (Spartak Moscow)

1 own goal:

- (Sweden) Daniel Arnefjord (Aalesund for Anzhi)
- (Russia) Shamil Lakhiyalov (Anzhi for Aalesund)
