= 2009 IFK Göteborg season =

IFK Göteborg
2009 season
- Manager: Jonas Olsson & Stefan Rehn
- Allsvenskan: 2nd
- Europa League: 3rd Qualifying round
- Svenska Cupen: Final
- Top goalscorer: Tobias Hysén (18)

IFK Göteborg had a near-miss season, losing a decisive match against AIK, where a win would have clinched the title. In spite of Thomas Olsson giving Blåvitt the lead, goals from Antônio Flávio and Daniel Tjernström saw the grip slip out of IFK's hands. Adding to the misery, AIK also won the cup final clash between the sides.

Most notable in the season was the success of Tobias Hysén, scoring 18 goals in the league, the highest number for the club for more than ten years.

== Squad ==
=== Goalkeepers ===
- (Denmark) Kim Christensen
- (Sweden) Marcus Sandberg

=== Defenders ===
- (Sweden) Karl Svensson
- (Sweden) Nicklas Carlsson
- (Sweden) Petter Björlund
- (Finland) Tuomo Turunen
- (Sweden) Adam Johansson
- (Iceland) Ragnar Sigurðsson
- (Sweden) Gustaf Svensson
- (Iceland) Hjálmar Jónsson
- (Sweden) Erik Lund
- (Sweden) Sebastian Eriksson
- (Sweden) Mikael Dyrestam

=== Midfielders ===
- (Sweden) Thomas Olsson
- (Sweden) Stefan Selaković
- (Sweden) Jakob Johansson
- (Sweden) Daniel Alexandersson
- (Sweden) Niclas Alexandersson
- (Sweden) Tobias Sana
- (Iceland) Teddy Bjarnason

=== Attackers ===
- (Sweden) Tobias Hysén
- (Sweden) Robin Söder
- (Sweden) Hannes Stiller
- (Sweden) Niklas Bärkroth

== Allsvenskan ==
=== Matches ===
- Helsingborg-IFK Göteborg 1-0
- 1-0 Marcus Lantz 45' (pen.)
- IFK Göteborg-Djurgården 6-0
- 1-0 Stefan Selaković 3'
- 2-0 Robin Söder 6'
- 3-0 Tobias Hysén 28'
- 4-0 Tobias Hysén 42'
- 5-0 Ragnar Sigurðsson 84'
- 6-0 Pontus Wernbloom 88'
- Häcken-IFK Göteborg 4-1
- 1-0 Paulinho 45'
- 2-0 Josef Karlsson 52'
- 3-0 Mathias Ranégie 70'
- 4-0 Mathias Ranégie 83'
- 4-1 Tobias Hysén 88'
- IFK Göteborg-Örgryte 3-0
- 1-0 Tobias Hysén 14'
- 2-0 Stefan Selaković 26'
- 3-0 Ragnar Sigurðsson 55'
- Hammarby-IFK Göteborg 0-1
- 0-1 Robin Söder 55'
- IFK Göteborg-Örebro 1-0
- 1-0 Tobias Hysén 35'
- Elfsborg-IFK Göteborg 2-0
- 1-0 Daniel Mobaeck 31'
- 2-0 Emir Bajrami 54'
- IFK Göteborg-Gefle 3-0
- 1-0 Pontus Wernbloom 27'
- 2-0 Pontus Wernbloom 37'
- 3-0 Ragnar Sigurðsson 64'
- IFK Göteborg-Kalmar FF 2-1
- 1-0 Tobias Hysén 58'
- 2-0 Tobias Hysén 68'
- 2-1 Abiola Dauda 72'
- GAIS-IFK Göteborg 0-1
- 0-1 Tobias Hysén 50'
- IFK Göteborg-Malmö FF 2-0
- 1-0 Pontus Wernbloom 13'
- 2-0 Tobias Hysén 69'
- IFK Göteborg-Brommapojkarna 4-0
- 1-0 Pontus Wernbloom 58'
- 2-0 Niklas Bärkroth 79'
- 3-0 Stefan Selaković 80'
- 4-0 Niklas Bärkroth 82'
- Halmstad-IFK Göteborg 0-0
- AIK-IFK Göteborg 1-0
- 1-0 Nils-Eric Johansson 42'
- IFK Göteborg-Trelleborg 3-1
- 1-0 Jakob Johansson 14'
- 2-0 Thomas Olsson 26'
- 2-1 Fredrik Jensen 50'
- 3-1 Ragnar Sigurðsson 81' (pen.)
- Trelleborg-IFK Göteborg 2-1
- 0-1 Gustav Svensson 2'
- 1-1 Andreas Drugge 51'
- 2-1 Andreas Wihlborg 58'
- IFK Göteborg-Häcken 2-2
- 0-1 Mattias Östberg 41'
- 0-2 Johan Karlsson 54'
- 1-2 Hannes Stiller 85'
- 2-2 Thomas Olsson 90'
- Örgryte-IFK Göteborg 1-2
- 1-0 Alex 15'
- 1-1 Tobias Hysén 53'
- 1-2 Tobias Hysén 90'
- IFK Göteborg-Helsingborg 2-2
- 1-0 Sebastian Eriksson 28'
- 2-0 Erik Lund 30'
- 2-1 René Makondele 47'
- 2-2 René Makondele 77'
- Djurgården-IFK Göteborg 0-0
- IFK Göteborg-Elfsborg 4-0
- 1-0 Hjálmar Jónsson 55'
- 2-0 Hannes Stiller 57'
- 3-0 Hannes Stiller 65'
- 4-0 Tobias Hysén 88'
- Gefle-IFK Göteborg 0-3
- 0-1 Hannes Stiller 29'
- 0-2 Gustav Svensson 47'
- 0-3 Hannes Stiller 51'
- IFK Göteborg-Hammarby 2-0
- 1-0 Tobias Hysén 26'
- 2-0 Tobias Hysén 45'
- Örebro-IFK Göteborg 0-0
- Kalmar FF-IFK Göteborg 2-1
- 1-0 Abiola Dauda 9'
- 1-1 Hannes Stiller 76'
- 2-1 Ricardo Santos 85'
- IFK Göteborg-GAIS 2-1
- 1-0 Stefan Selaković 37'
- 1-1 Eyjólfur Héðinsson 55'
- 2-1 Stefan Selaković 90'
- Malmö FF-IFK Göteborg 0-1
- 0-1 Thomas Olsson 28'
- Brommapojkarna-IFK Göteborg 0-3
- 0-1 Tobias Hysén 49'
- 0-2 Niclas Alexandersson 81'
- 0-3 Tobias Hysén 82'
- IFK Göteborg-Halmstad 2-2
- 0-1 Emir Kujović 30'
- 0-2 Jónas Guðni Sævarsson 43'
- 1-2 Tobias Hysén 52'
- 2-2 Tobias Hysén 76'
- IFK Göteborg-AIK 1-2
- 1-0 Thomas Olsson 32'
- 1-1 Antônio Flávio 56'
- 1-2 Daniel Tjernström 85'

=== Topscorers ===
- (Sweden) Tobias Hysén 18
- (Sweden) Hannes Stiller 6
- (Sweden) Stefan Selaković 5
- (Sweden) Pontus Wernbloom 5
- (Sweden) Thomas Olsson 4
- (Iceland) Ragnar Sigurðsson 4
