= David Moberg Karlsson =

Swedish footballer (born 1994)

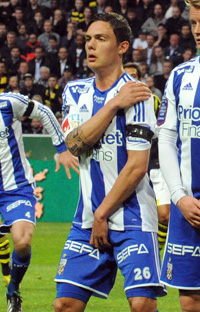
- Karlsson with IFK Göteborg in 2013

Personal information
- Full name: Jens David Joacim; Moberg Karlsson
- Date of birth: 20 March 1994 (age 32)
- Place of birth: Mariestad, Sweden
- Height: 1.79 m (5 ft 10 in)
- Positions: Winger; forward

Team information
- Current team: Tochigi City
- Number: 19

Youth career
- –2008: Björsäters IF
- 2008–2009: IFK Mariestad
- 2010–2012: IFK Göteborg

Senior career*
Years	Team	Apps	(Gls)
2009–2010	IFK Mariestad	14	(0)
2011–2013	IFK Göteborg	30	(2)
2013–2014	Sunderland	0	(0)
2014	→ Kilmarnock (loan)	4	(0)
2014–2016	FC Nordsjælland	48	(5)
2016–2018	IFK Norrköping	74	(18)
2019–2021	Sparta Prague	71	(19)
2022–2024	Urawa Red Diamonds	29	(8)
2023–2024	→ Aris Thessaloniki (loan)	14	(0)
2024–2025	IFK Norrköping	31	(7)
2026–	Tochigi City	0	(0)

International career^{‡}
2009–2011	Sweden U17	6	(1)
2012–2013	Sweden U19	11	(5)
2015–2017	Sweden U21	6	(3)
2017–2018	Sweden	3	(1)
- * Club domestic league appearances and goals as of 11 January 2026 ‡ National team caps and goals as of 11 January 2018

Jens David Joacim Moberg Karlsson (born 20 March 1994) is a Swedish professional footballer who plays as a winger or a forward for Tochigi City. He has won three caps and scored one goal for the Sweden national team.

== Club career ==
=== Early career ===
David Moberg Karlsson grew up just outside Mariestad in Sweden where he made his first team debut for local fifth tier club IFK Mariestad as a fourteen-year-old. Due to his impressive performances with the Swedish youth national teams he was sought after by several clubs, but chose to sign a youth contract with IFK Göteborg, the club he grew up supporting.

=== IFK Göteborg ===
During the 2011 Allsvenskan season he started training with the first team and made his league debut in a game against AIK. His progress led to IFK Göteborg signing him on a five-year first team contract in May 2012. At the start of the 2013 Allsvenskan season he finally scored his first league goal for the club in a 2–0 win against IF Brommapojkarna.

=== Sunderland ===
On 19 June 2013, he signed for Premier League club Sunderland for an estimated €1.9 million. Moberg Karlsson scored his first goal for Sunderland in the Premier League Asia Trophy against Tottenham Hotspur on 24 July 2013. He made his competitive debut against Milton Keynes Dons in the Football League Cup, starting in a 4–2 victory.

==== Loan to Kilmarnock ====
On 31 January 2014, Karlsson joined Kilmarnock on loan for the remainder of the season.

=== FC Nordsjælland ===
On 13 August 2014, Karlsson joined Danish club FC Nordsjælland on a four-year contract for an undisclosed fee.

=== IFK Norrköping ===
On 21 June 2016, Karlsson joined IFK Norrköping on a 3 1/2-year-long contract for an undisclosed fee.

=== Sparta Prague ===
On 10 December 2018, Karlsson joined AC Sparta Prague on a 3 1/2-year-long contract for an undisclosed fee.

=== Urawa Reds ===
On 30 December 2021, Karlsson joined Urawa Red Diamonds.

=== Aris ===
On 19 July 2023, Aris officially announced the acquisition of Karlsson on a season-long loan.

=== Return to IFK Norrköping ===
On 27 July 2024, Karlsson rejoined IFK Norrköping and was presented on field at half time during a game against Kalmar FF, signing a contract through the 2026 season.

=== Tochigi City ===
On 11 January 2026, Karlsson joined J2 side Tochigi City.

== International career ==
Having represented the Sweden U17, U19, and U21 teams between 2009 and 2017, he made his full international debut for Sweden on 8 January 2017 in a friendly 2–1 loss against the Ivory Coast when he replaced Nicklas Bärkroth in the 62nd minute. He scored his first international goal in a friendly 6–0 win against Slovakia on 12 January 2017.

== Career statistics ==
=== Club ===
As of match played on 16 June 2021

Appearances and goals by club, season and competition
Club	Season	League			National cup		League cup		Continental		Total	
Club	Season	Division	Apps	Goals	Apps	Goals	Apps	Goals	Apps	Goals	Apps	Goals
IFK Mariestad	2009	Division 3 Mellersta Götaland	5	0	0	0	—		—		5	0
IFK Mariestad	2010	Division 3 Mellersta Götaland	9	0	—		—		—		9	0
IFK Mariestad	Total		14	0	0	0	0	0	0	0	14	0
IFK Göteborg	2010	Allsvenskan	0	0	0	0	—		0	0	0	0
IFK Göteborg	2011	Allsvenskan	2	0	0	0	—		—		2	0
IFK Göteborg	2012	Allsvenskan	18	0	1	1	—		—		19	1
IFK Göteborg	2013	Allsvenskan	10	2	5	2	—		—		15	4
IFK Göteborg	Total		30	2	6	3	0	0	0	0	36	5
Sunderland	2013–14	Premier League	0	0	0	0	1	0	—		1	0
Kilmarnock (loan)	2013–14	Scottish Premiership	4	0	0	0	—		—		4	0
Nordsjælland	2014–15	Danish Superliga	25	4	0	0	—		—		25	4
Nordsjælland	2015–16	Danish Superliga	23	1	0	0	—		—		23	1
Nordsjælland	Total		48	5	0	0	0	0	0	0	48	5
IFK Norrköping	2016	Allsvenskan	17	2	1	0	—		—		18	2
IFK Norrköping	2017	Allsvenskan	28	6	5	2	—		3 (Note: Appearances in UEFA Europa League)	1	36	9
IFK Norrköping	2018	Allsvenskan	0	0	3	1	—		—		3	1
IFK Norrköping	Total		45	8	9	3	0	0	3	1	57	12
Sparta Prague	2018–19	Czech First League	15	3	2	0	—		—		17	3
Sparta Prague	2019–20	Czech First League	17	4	4	2	—		1	0	22	6
Sparta Prague	2020–21	Czech First League	26	10	3	2	—		6	0	35	12
Sparta Prague	2021–22	Czech First League	13	2	2	1	—		7 (Note: Four appearances and two goals in UEFA Champions League, three appearances in UEFA Europa League)	2	22	5
Sparta Prague	Total		71	19	11	5	0	0	14	2	96	26
Urawa Red Diamonds	2022	J1 League	20	8	1	0	3	0	7 (Note: Appearances in AFC Champions League)	5	31	13
Career total			232	43	28	11	4	0	24	8	286	61

=== International ===
Appearances and goals by national team and year
National team	Year	Apps	Goals
Sweden	2017	2	1
Sweden	2018	1	0
Total		3	1

Scores and results list Sweden's goal tally first, score column indicates score after each Karlsson goal.

List of international goals scored by David Moberg Karlsson
No.	Date	Venue	Opponent	Score	Result	Competition	Ref.
1.	12 January 2017	Armed Forces Stadium, Abu Dhabi, UAE	Slovakia	2–0	6–0	Friendly	

== Honours ==
IFK Göteborg

- Svenska Cupen: 2012–13

Sparta Prague

- Czech Cup: 2019–20

Urawa Red Diamonds

- AFC Champions League: 2022
