= Holmsjö =

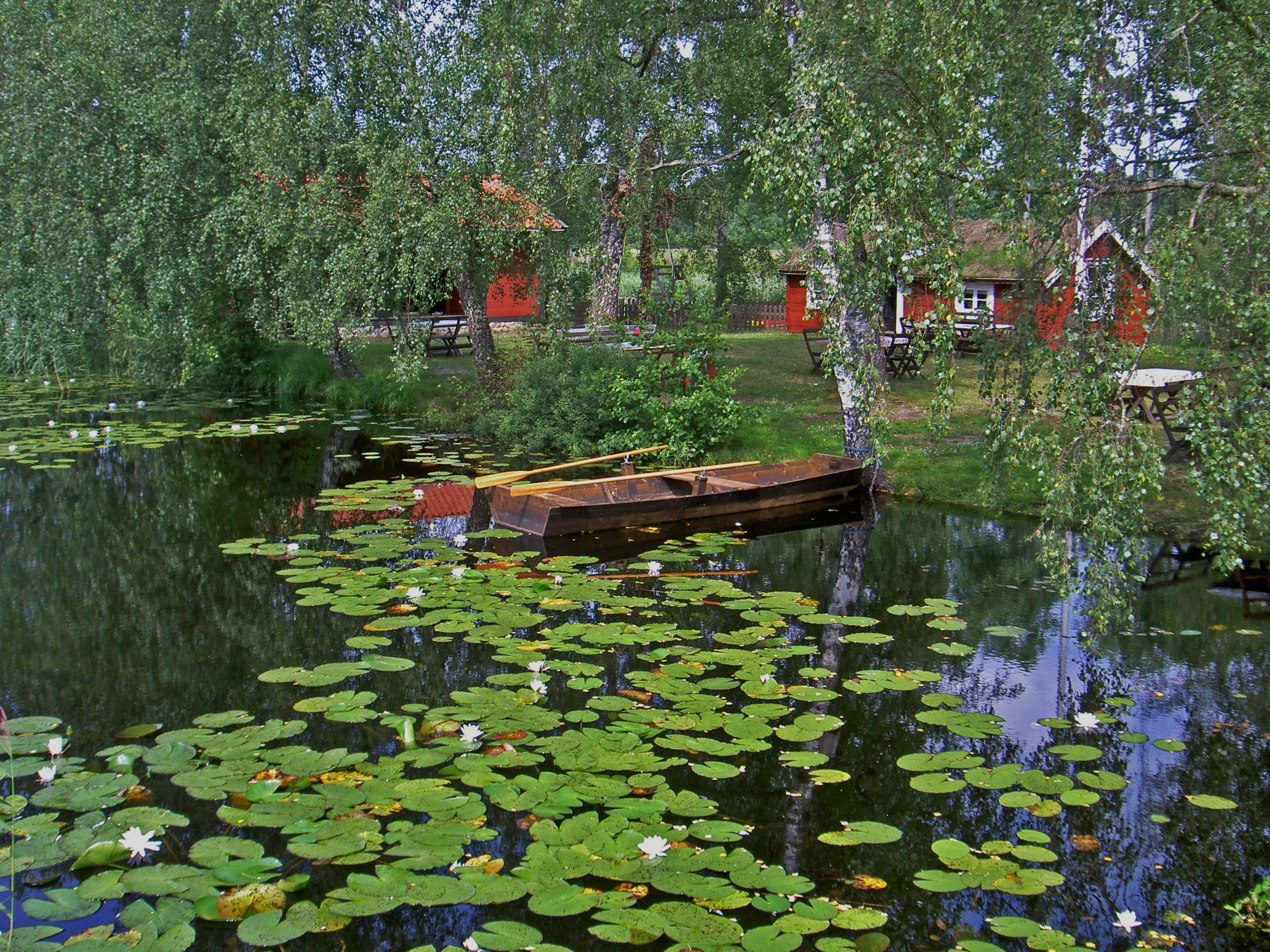
- Holmsjö

- Location within Blekinge Location within Sweden
- Coordinates: 56°25′N 15°32′E
- Country: Sweden
- Province: Blekinge
- County: Blekinge County
- Municipality: Karlskrona Municipality

Area
  - Total: 1.08 km^{2} (0.42 sq mi)

Population (31 December 2010)
  - Total: 334
  - Density: 308/km^{2} (800/sq mi)
- Time zone: UTC+1 (CET)
  - Summer (DST): UTC+2 (CEST)

Holmsjö is a locality situated in Karlskrona Municipality, Blekinge County, Sweden with 334 inhabitants in 2010.

In February 2023, police and local authorities struck against a meeting held by the motorcycle gang Bandidos in Holmsjö.
