= Martin Strömbergsson =

Swedish football referee (born 1977)

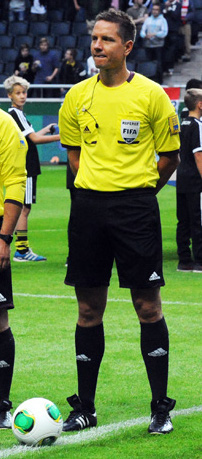
- Born: 1 April 1977 (age 49); Sweden
- Other occupation: Full-time referee Social educationist

Domestic
Years	League	Role
2008–	Superettan	Referee
2009–	Allsvenskan	Referee

International
Years	League	Role
2011–	FIFA listed	Referee

Martin Strömbergsson (born 1977) is a Swedish football referee. Strömbergsson currently resides in Gävle. He has been a full international referee for FIFA since 2011. He became a professional referee in 1997 and has been an Allsvenskan referee since 2009. Strömbergsson has refereed 73 matches in Allsvenskan, 38 matches in Superettan and 24 international matches as of 2014. He is the brother of Markus Strömbergsson.

== See also ==
- List of football referees
