= Jonathan Azulay =

Swedish footballer

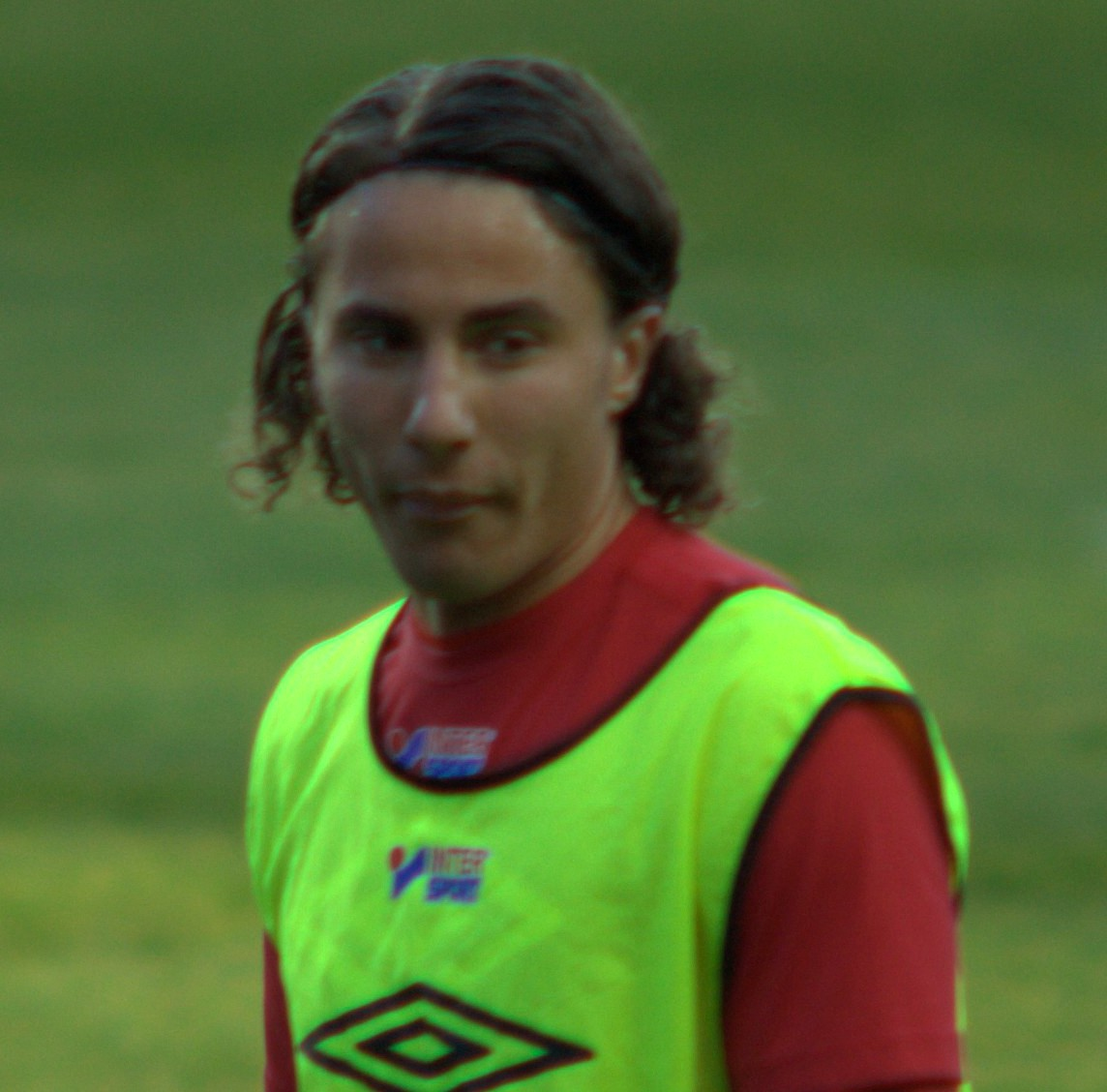

Personal information
- Full name: Karl Levi Jonathan Azulay
- Date of birth: 5 May 1993 (age 33)
- Place of birth: Gothenburg, Sweden
- Height: 1.82 m (5 ft 11 1/2 in)
- Position: Centre back

Team information
- Current team: Örgryte
- Number: 3

Youth career
- –2001: BK Smitten
- 2001–2007: Askims IK
- 2008–2011: IFK Göteborg

Senior career*
Years	Team	Apps	(Gls)
2011–2014	IFK Göteborg	1	(0)
2013	→ Örgryte IS (loan)	27	(1)
2014	→ Östersunds FK (loan)	27	(0)
2015	Östersunds FK	19	(0)
2016	Degerfors IF	18	(0)
2017	Utsiktens BK	20	(0)
2018–2020	Norrby IF	71	(1)
2021–	Örgryte	136	(9)

International career
2008–2010	Sweden U17	8	(2)
2010–2012	Sweden U19	15	(1)
2013	Sweden U21	3	(0)
- * Club domestic league appearances and goals as of 9 July 2026

Jonathan Azulay (Hebrew: יונתן אזולאי; born 5 May 1993) is a Swedish footballer who plays as a defender for Örgryte.

== Club career ==
On 11 January 2021, Azulay signed a three-year contract with Örgryte.
