= Hjörtur Logi Valgarðsson =

Icelandic footballer

Logi Valgarðsson
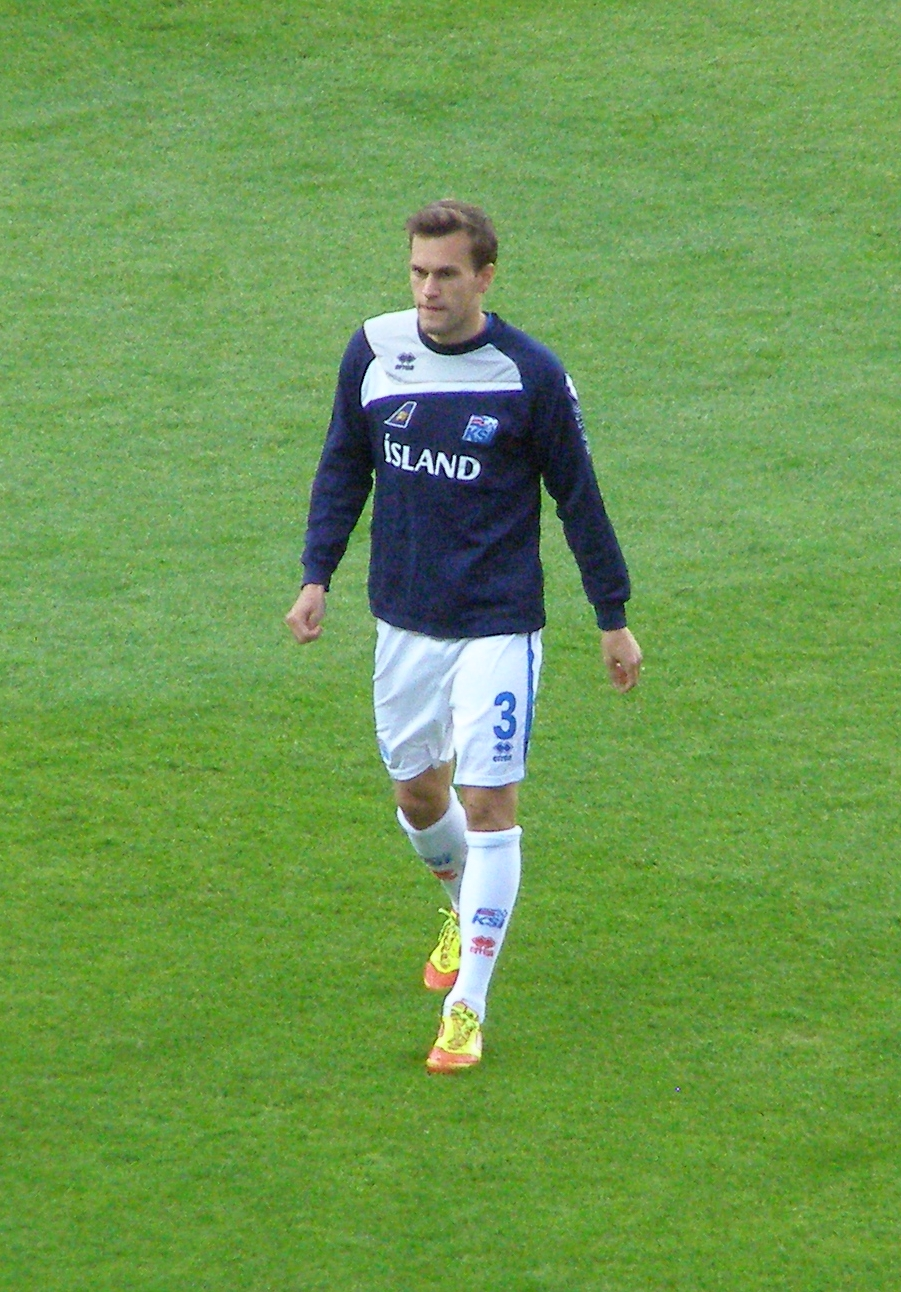

Personal information
- Full name: Hjörtur Logi Valgarðsson
- Date of birth: 27 September 1988 (age 38)
- Place of birth: Reykjavík, Iceland
- Height: 1.82 m (5 ft 11 1/2 in)
- Position: Defender

Senior career*
Years	Team	Apps	(Gls)
2006–2010	FH Hafnarfjörður	70	(2)
2011–2013	IFK Göteborg	46	(0)
2014	Sogndal	26	(1)
2015–2017	Örebro SK	54	(1)
2018–2022	FH Hafnarfjörður	57	(3)

International career^{‡}
2006–2007	Iceland U19	7	(0)
2008–2011	Iceland U21	14	(1)
2008–2016	Iceland	10	(0)
- * Club domestic league appearances and goals as of 18 April 2023 ‡ National team caps and goals as of 17 January 2020

Hjörtur Logi Valgarðsson (born 27 September 1988) is an Icelandic professional footballer who plays as a defender.

== Club career ==
He made his debut with FH Hafnarfjörður when he was 18 years old in 2006 and was from the season 2008 a key player for the club.

Logi signed with Swedish club IFK Göteborg on 18 January 2011 after having been on trial with them in December 2010.

Logi signed with Norwegian side Sogndal ahead of the 2014 season, where he was re-united with his previous manager from IFK Göteborg, Jonas Olsson.

== International career ==
On 18 June 2011, Logi scored his first goal for Iceland U21 in the 3–1 win against Denmark U21 at the 2011 UEFA European Under-21 Football Championship. He made his debut with the Icelandic national team against Faroe Islands on 15 March 2008.

== Honours ==
=== Club ===
IFK Göteborg

- Svenska Cupen: 2012–13
