= Daniel Sobralense =

Brazilian footballer (born 1983)

Personal information
- Full name: Daniel Lopes da Silva
- Date of birth: 10 February 1983 (age 43)
- Place of birth: Sobral, Brazil
- Height: 1.73 m (5 ft 8 in)
- Position: Midfielder

Youth career
- Guarany de Sobral

Senior career*
Years	Team	Apps	(Gls)
2004	Guarany de Sobral		
2004	Fortaleza		
2005–2006	Guarany de Sobral		
2006	Parnahyba		
2007	Icasa		
2007	Náutico	8	(0)
2007	Fortaleza	6	(1)
2008–2011	Kalmar FF	91	(19)
2012–2014	IFK Göteborg	43	(4)
2014	→ Örebro SK (loan)	11	(3)
2015–2017	Fortaleza	49	(16)
2017	Paysandu	8	(0)
2018	Santa Cruz	5	(0)
2019	Atlético Cearense	0	(0)
2020	Guarany de Sobral	0	(0)
2020	Campinense	1	(0)
- * Club domestic league appearances and goals

Daniel Lopes da Silva (born 10 February 1983), known as Daniel Sobralense, is a Brazilian former footballer who played as an attacking midfielder.

== Career statistics ==
As of 1 November 2014

Club	Season	League		Cup		Continental		Total	
Club	Season	Apps	Goals	Apps	Goals	Apps	Goals	Apps	Goals
Náutico	2007	8	0	0	0	—		8	0
Náutico	Total	8	0	0	0	0	0	8	0
Fortaleza	2007	6	1	0	0	—		6	0
Fortaleza	Total	6	1	0	0	0	0	6	1
Kalmar FF	2008	19	5	4	1	4	2	27	8
Kalmar FF	2009	26	6	0	0	2	0	28	6
Kalmar FF	2010	23	2	4	1	4	1	31	4
Kalmar FF	2011	23	6	4	0	—		27	6
Kalmar FF	Total	91	19	12	2	10	3	113	24
IFK Göteborg	2012	21	4	1	2	—		22	6
IFK Göteborg	2013	14	0	6	0	1	0	21	0
IFK Göteborg	2014	8	0	1	1	4	0	13	1
IFK Göteborg	Total	43	4	8	3	5	0	56	7
Örebro SK	2014	11	3	1	0	—		12	3
Örebro SK	Total	11	3	1	0	0	0	12	3
Fortaleza	2015	0	0	0	0	—		0	0
Fortaleza	Total	0	0	0	0	0	0	0	0
Career total		159	27	21	5	15	3	195	35

== Honours ==
=== Club ===
Fortaleza

- Campeonato Cearense: 2004, 2007, 2016

Parnahyba

- Campeonato Piauiense: 2006

Kalmar FF

- Allsvenskan: 2008
- Svenska Supercupen: 2009

IFK Göteborg

- Svenska Cupen: 2012–13

Paysandu

- Campeonato Paraense: 2017
