= Erik Dahlin =

Swedish footballer

Personal information
- Full name: Erik Axel Dahlin
- Date of birth: 28 April 1989 (age 37)
- Place of birth: Trollhättan, Sweden
- Height: 1.86 m (6 ft 1 in)
- Position: Goalkeeper

Youth career
- –2005: Trollhättans FK
- 2006–2007: IFK Göteborg

Senior career*
Years	Team	Apps	(Gls)
2007–2012	IFK Göteborg	23	(0)
2008	→ Västra Frölunda IF (loan)	20	(0)
2009	→ FC Trollhättan (loan)	2	(0)
2013–2014	Sogndal	35	(0)
2014	FC Trollhättan	12	(0)
2015	IK Oddevold	26	(0)
2016–2019	IFK Göteborg	19	(0)
2019–2020	Ljungskile SK	25	(0)
Total		162	(0)

International career
2004–2006	Sweden U17	13	(0)
2006–2008	Sweden U19	9	(0)
- * Club domestic league appearances and goals

Erik Axel Dahlin (born 28 April 1989) is a Swedish former footballer who played as a goalkeeper. He is the younger brother to the Malmö FF goalkeeper Johan Dahlin.
