= Joel Allansson =

Swedish footballer (born 1992)

Personal information
- Full name: Joel Emil Martin Allansson
- Date of birth: 3 November 1992 (age 34)
- Place of birth: Sweden
- Height: 1.74 m (5 ft 8 1/2 in)
- Position: Midfielder

Team information
- Current team: Halmstads BK
- Number: 6

Youth career
- –2008: Nybro IF
- 2008–2011: IFK Göteborg

Senior career*
Years	Team	Apps	(Gls)
2008	Nybro IF	11	(0)
2011–2014	IFK Göteborg	61	(2)
2015–2018	Randers FC	66	(1)
2019–	Halmstads BK	213	(9)

International career^{‡}
2008–2009	Sweden U17	9	(0)
2009–2011	Sweden U19	9	(1)
2012–2013	Sweden U21	5	(0)
2017	Sweden	2	(0)
- * Club domestic league appearances and goals as of 9 July 2026 ‡ National team caps and goals as of 12 January 2017

Joel Emil Martin Allansson (born 3 November 1992) is a Swedish footballer who plays as a midfielder for Halmstads BK.

== Career ==
=== Halmstads BK ===
On 24 December 2018, Halmstads BK announced, that they had signed Allansson on a free agent at the end of the year.

== Career statistics ==
As of 1 November 2014

Club	Season	League		Cup		Continental		Total	
Club	Season	Apps	Goals	Apps	Goals	Apps	Goals	Apps	Goals
Nybro IF	2008	11	0	—		—		11	0
Nybro IF	Total	11	0	0	0	0	0	11	0
IFK Göteborg	2009	0	0	0	0	0	0	0	0
IFK Göteborg	2010	0	0	0	0	0	0	0	0
IFK Göteborg	2011	17	0	3	0	—		20	0
IFK Göteborg	2012	20	2	1	0	—		21	2
IFK Göteborg	2013	3	0	4	1	0	0	7	1
IFK Göteborg	2014	21	0	1	1	4	0	26	1
IFK Göteborg	Total	61	2	9	2	4	0	74	4
Randers FC	2014–15	0	0	0	0	—		0	0
Randers FC	Total	0	0	0	0	0	0	0	0
Career total		72	2	9	2	4	0	85	4

== Honours ==
IFK Göteborg

- Svenska Cupen: 2012–13
