= Nordin Gerzić =

Swedish footballer

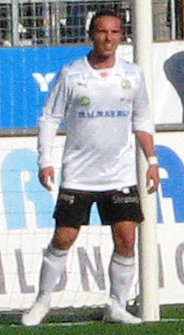

Personal information
- Date of birth: 9 November 1983 (age 42)
- Place of birth: Bosanska Gradiška, SR Bosnia and Herzegovina, Yugoslavia
- Height: 1.75 m (5 ft 9 in)
- Position: Midfielder

Youth career
- 1994–1997: Eskilstuna City
- 1998–2000: Örebro SK
- 2000: Bayern Munich

Senior career*
Years	Team	Apps	(Gls)
2001–2002	Örebro SK Ungdom		
2003	Örebro SK	0	(0)
2003	→ Rynninge IK (loan)	10	(2)
2004–2006	Rynninge IK		
2007–2012	Örebro SK	115	(10)
2012–2014	IFK Göteborg	34	(2)
2013	→ Örebro SK (loan)	13	(1)
2014	→ Örebro SK (loan)	28	(2)
2015–2021	Örebro SK	185	(11)

International career
2000	Bosnia and Herzegovina U16	4	(0)
2011	Sweden	2	(0)
- * Club domestic league appearances and goals

Nordin Gerzić (born 9 November 1983) is a former footballer who played as a midfielder. He ended his career in December 2021. Born in Bosnia–Herzegovina, he played for the Sweden national team.

== Club career ==
Gerzić left Bosnia and Herzegovina and arrived in Sweden at the age of seven or eight. He started his football career in Eskilstuna City, where he played between 1994 and 1997 before signing with Örebro SK, in the start of 2000, he was given a trial with German side Bayern Munich, but he failed to impress and returned home to Örebro. In 2003, he went on loan to Rynninge IK and eventually signed for the club. He played there for two seasons, during his time there, he was named "Best Forward" in Division 2 Östra Svealand. In 2007, he returned to Örebro SK.

== International career ==
After featuring for the Bosnia and Herzegovina U-16 team, he switched allegiance and made his senior debut for Sweden in a January 2011 friendly match against Botswana and has earned a total of 2 caps, scoring no goals. His second and final international came three days later in a friendly against South Africa.

== Career statistics ==
=== Club ===
As of 1 November 2014

Club	Season	League		Cup		Continental		Total	
Club	Season	Apps	Goals	Apps	Goals	Apps	Goals	Apps	Goals
Örebro SK	2003	0	0	0	0	—		0	0
Örebro SK	Total	0	0	0	0	0	0	0	0
Rynninge IK^{[A]}	2003	10	2	0	0	—		10	2
Rynninge IK^{[A]}	Total	10	2	0	0	0	0	10	2
Örebro SK	2007	8	0	0	0	—		8	0
Örebro SK	2008	28	4	1	1	—		29	5
Örebro SK	2009	27	1	1	0	—		28	1
Örebro SK	2010	26	5	3	0	—		29	5
Örebro SK	2011	26	0	3	0	2	0	31	0
Örebro SK	Total	115	10	8	1	2	0	125	11
IFK Göteborg	2012	23	2	1	1	—		24	3
IFK Göteborg	2013	11	0	1	0	0	0	12	0
Örebro SK	2013	13	1	1	0	—		14	1
Örebro SK	Total	13	1	1	0	0	0	14	1
IFK Göteborg	2014	—		2	0	—		2	0
IFK Göteborg	Total	34	2	4	1	0	0	38	3
Örebro SK	2014	28	2	0	0	—		28	2
Örebro SK	2015	30	1	0	0	—		30	1
Örebro SK	2016	27	4	4	3	—		31	7
Örebro SK	2017	29	3	3	1	—		32	4
Örebro SK	2018	2	0	4	0	—		6	0
Örebro SK	Total	116	10	11	4	0	0	127	14
Career total		288	25	24	6	2	0	314	31

A. Statistics between 2004 and 2006 are not included due to lack of information.

=== International ===
As of 22 January 2011

National team	Year	Apps	Goals
Sweden	2011	2	0
Total		2	0
