= Erik Lund (footballer) =

Swedish footballer and manager (born 1988)

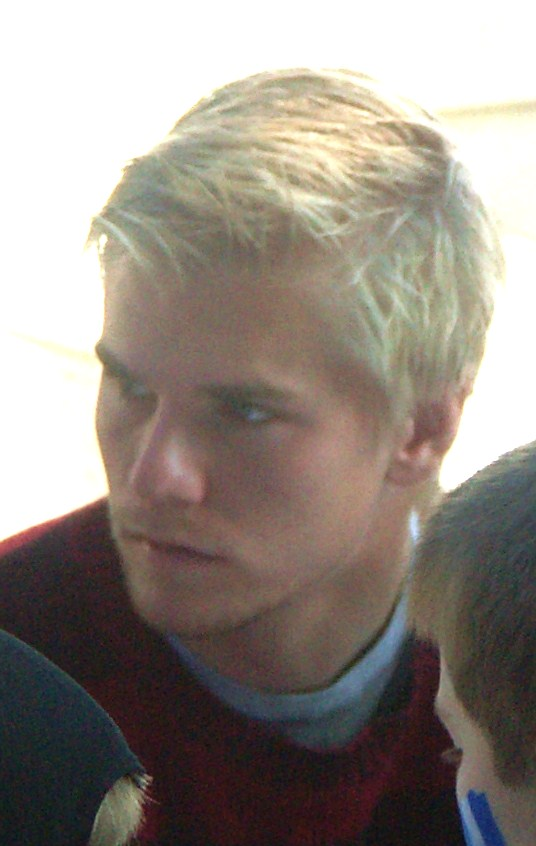
- Lund in 2009

Personal information
- Full name: Erik Olof Gustav Lund
- Date of birth: 6 November 1988 (age 37)
- Place of birth: Ljungskile, Sweden
- Height: 1.86 m (6 ft 1 in)
- Position: Right back

Team information
- Current team: Ljungskile SK (manager)

Youth career
- –2004: Ljungskile SK
- 2005–2008: Aston Villa

Senior career*
Years	Team	Apps	(Gls)
2003–2005	Ljungskile SK	21	(2)
2008–2013	IFK Göteborg	77	(1)
2013	→ Örebro SK (loan)	6	(0)
2014–2017	Varbergs BoIS	59	(0)
2018–2020	Ljungskile SK	47	(0)
Total		210	(3)

International career
2008–2010	Sweden U21	11	(0)
2010	Sweden	2	(0)

Managerial career
- 2018: Ljungskile SK (caretaker)
- 2018–2020: Ljungskile SK (assistant)
- 2021–: Ljungskile SK
- * Club domestic league appearances and goals

Erik Lund (born 6 November 1988) is a Swedish football manager and former player, who is the current manager of Ljungskile SK. He played as right back and spent most of his career at Ljungskile SK and IFK Göteborg. Lund also spent three years at the Aston Villa Academy and played twice for the Sweden national team in 2010.

== Career ==
Lund began his career at Ljungskile SK, playing in the first team in both Swedish Division 2 and the Superettan, making his debut at 15. He went on to sign for Aston Villa's youth team on 1 July 2005 at the age of 16. After a season in the academy side he appeared in 10 games for Villa's reserves in the 2006–07 season, and scored a rare goal in the opening match of the HKFC International Soccer Sevens against Hong Kong F.C. in a 1–0 victory. On 3 June 2007 he signed a new 2-year professional contract with Villa. In August 2007, Lund made his debut for the first team, coming on as a substitute for Craig Gardner in the pre-season friendly against Walsall.

On 1 July 2008, Lund agreed to a three-and-a-half-year contract with IFK Göteborg. He made his debut for IFK in a Svenska Cupen win over GIF Sundsvall on 10 July. On 23 July he made his UEFA Champions League debut in IFK's 4–0 win over Murata. Lund moved to Varbergs BoIS following the 2013 season, after a loan spell at Örebro SK.

== Career statistics ==
=== Club ===
As of 19 June 2013

Appearances and goals by club, season and competition
Club	Season	League		Cup		Continental		Total	
Club	Season	Apps	Goals	Apps	Goals	Apps	Goals	Apps	Goals
Ljungskile SK	2004	14	2	—		—		14	2
Ljungskile SK	2005	6	0	—		—		6	0
Ljungskile SK	Total	20	2	0	0	0	0	20	2
Aston Villa	2005–06	0	0	0	0	—		0	0
Aston Villa	2006–07	0	0	0	0	—		0	0
Aston Villa	2007–08	0	0	0	0	—		0	0
Aston Villa	Total	0	0	0	0	0	0	0	0
IFK Göteborg	2008	11	0	2	0	1	0	14	0
IFK Göteborg	2009	24	1	5	1	2	0	31	2
IFK Göteborg	2010	22	0	1	0	2	0	25	0
IFK Göteborg	2011	19	0	3	0	—		22	0
IFK Göteborg	2012	1	0	0	0	—		1	0
Örebro SK	2013	6	0	—		—		6	0
Örebro SK	Total	6	0	0	0	0	0	6	0
IFK Göteborg	2013	0	0	0	0	0	0	0	0
IFK Göteborg	2014	0	0	0	0	0	0	0	0
IFK Göteborg	Total	77	1	11	1	5	0	93	2
Career total		103	3	11	1	5	0	119	4

=== International ===
As of 23 January 2010

National team	Year	Apps	Goals
Sweden	2010	2	0
Total		2	0

== Honours ==
=== Club ===
Ljungskile SK

- Swedish Division 2 Västra Götaland (1): 2004

Aston Villa Academy

- FA Premier Reserve League South (1): 2007/08
- HKFC International Soccer Sevens (1): 2008

IFK Göteborg

- Svenska Cupen (1): 2008

Örebro SK

- Superettan Runner-up (1): 2013 (Promotion to Allsvenskan)
