= Hannes Stiller =

Swedish footballer (born 1978)

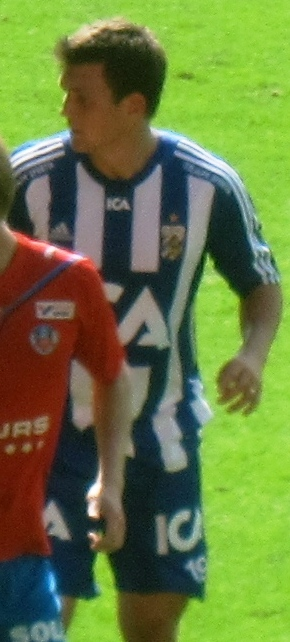
- Stiller in 2009

Personal information
- Date of birth: 3 July 1978 (age 48)
- Place of birth: Gothenburg, Sweden
- Height: 1.80 m (5 ft 11 in)
- Position: Striker

Youth career
- –1994: Qviding FIF
- 1994–1997: IFK Göteborg

Senior career*
Years	Team	Apps	(Gls)
1998–2004	Qviding FIF	148	(61)
2005–2006	Västra Frölunda IF	46	(25)
2007–2009	Qviding FIF	65	(39)
2009	→ IFK Göteborg (loan)	15	(6)
2010–2013	IFK Göteborg	89	(18)
2014–2016	Ljungskile SK	75	(18)
Total		438	(167)

Managerial career
- 2015–2016: Ljungskile SK (assistant)
- 2021–2022: IFK Göteborg (assistant)
- * Club domestic league appearances and goals

Hannes Stiller, née Tobiasson (born 3 July 1978) is a Swedish former footballer who played as a striker.

== Post-playing career ==
Stiller was appointed as club director of Ljungskile SK on 12 May 2016. Stiller later became youth coach in IFK Göteborg, and became acting assistant manager on 24 June 2021. He was the sporting director of IFK Göteborg from 2025 to 2026.

== Career statistics ==
Appearances and goals by club, season and competition
Club	Season	League		Cup		Continental		Total	
Club	Season	Apps	Goals	Apps	Goals	Apps	Goals	Apps	Goals
Qviding FIF	1998	22	5	—		—		22	5
Qviding FIF	1999	22	11	—		—		22	11
Qviding FIF	2000	22	14	—		—		22	14
Qviding FIF	2001	20	6	—		—		20	6
Qviding FIF	2002	22	13	—		—		22	13
Qviding FIF	2003	18	8	0	0	—		18	8
Qviding FIF	2004	22	4	—		—		22	4
Qviding FIF	Total	148	61	0	0	0	0	148	61
Västra Frölunda IF	2005	26	7	0	0	—		26	7
Västra Frölunda IF	2006	20	18	0	0	—		20	18
Västra Frölunda IF	Total	46	25	0	0	0	0	46	25
Qviding FIF	2007	21	20	0	0	—		21	20
Qviding FIF	2008	30	12	—		—		30	12
Qviding FIF	2009	14	7	2	3	—		16	10
Qviding FIF	Total	65	39	2	3	0	0	67	42
IFK Göteborg	2009	15	6	2	0	1	1	18	7
IFK Göteborg	2010	11	3	1	0	2	0	14	3
IFK Göteborg	2011	28	7	3	2	—		31	9
IFK Göteborg	2012	27	7	0	0	—		27	7
IFK Göteborg	2013	13	1	4	0	0	0	17	1
IFK Göteborg	Total	95	24	10	2	3	1	108	27
Career total		354	149	12	5	3	1	369	155

== Honours ==
Qviding FIF

- Division 1 Södra: 2007

IFK Göteborg

- Svenska Cupen: 2012–13

Individual

- Årets Ärkeängel: 2013
