= Mikael Dyrestam =

Guinean footballer

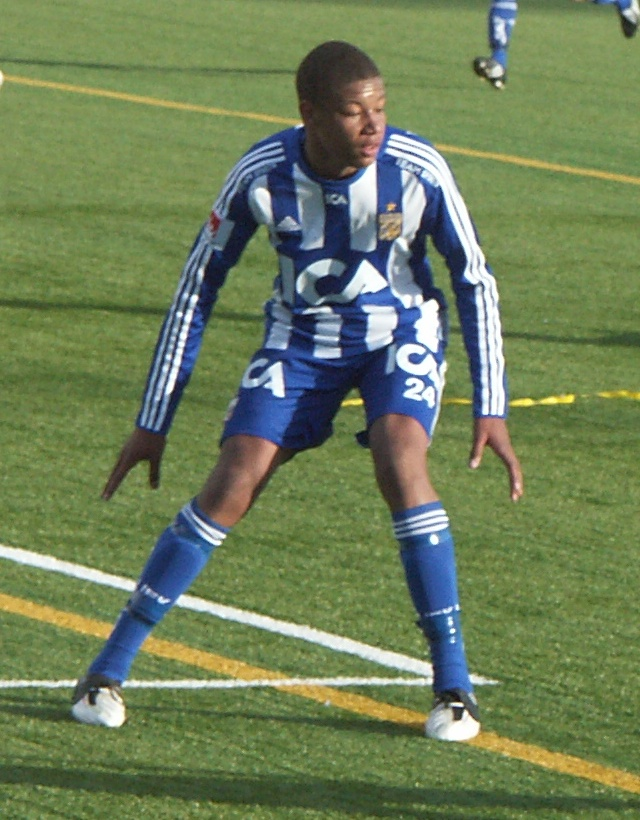
- Dyrestam with IFK Göteborg in 2009

Personal information
- Full name: Mikael Bertil Dyrestam
- Date of birth: 10 December 1991 (age 34)
- Place of birth: Växjö, Sweden
- Height: 1.86 m (6 ft 1 in)
- Position: Centre-back

Team information
- Current team: Örgryte IS
- Number: 6

Youth career
- 1999–2009: IFK Göteborg

Senior career*
Years	Team	Apps	(Gls)
2009–2013	IFK Göteborg	67	(2)
2014–2015	Aalesund	39	(0)
2016–2017	NEC	19	(0)
2017–2018	Kalmar FF	33	(1)
2019–2020	Xanthi	17	(0)
2020–2021	Sarpsborg 08	36	(2)
2022	Seraing	6	(0)
2022–2023	Al-Adalah	9	(0)
2023	Najran	10	(0)
2023–2024	Volos	0	(0)
2024–	Örgryte IS	58	(2)

International career^{‡}
2008–2009	Sweden U19	5	(0)
2011	Sweden U21	6	(0)
2012	Sweden	2	(0)
2019–2020	Guinea	9	(0)
- * Club domestic league appearances and goals as of 9 July 2026 ‡ National team caps and goals as of 14:38, 2 October 2023 (UTC)

Mikael Bertil Dyrestam (born 10 December 1991) is a Guinean professional footballer who plays as a centre-back for Allsvenskan club Örgryte IS.

== Career ==
Born in Gothenburg with Guinean roots, Dyrestam spent six years at IFK Göteborg, where he made 67 appearances. He left the club in the summer of 2013, after his contract had expired. In February 2014, it was reported a move to Bolton Wanderers had fallen through and that he was close to signing for their Championship rivals Derby County.

In March, Dyrestam moved to Norwegian side Aalesunds FK on a free transfer. After a lengthy injury spell, he made his official debut for Aalesunds FK in a 3–0 win against Sandnes Ulf on 12 June 2014. On 16 January 2019, he signed a year-and-a-half contract with Greek Super League club Xanthi for an undisclosed fee.

On 20 June 2022, Dyrestam signed for Saudi Pro League club Al-Adalah.

On 28 January 2023, Dyrestam joined Saudi First Division League side Najran.

On 2 October 2023, Dyrestam returned to Greece, signing for Super League club Volos.

== Career statistics ==
=== International ===
As of matches played on 10 October 2020

National team	Year	Apps	Goals
Sweden	2012	2	0
Sweden	Total	2	0
Guinea	2019	8	0
Guinea	2020	1	0
Guinea	Total	9	0
Career total		11	0

== Honours ==
IFK Göteborg

- Svenska Cupen: 2012–13
