= 2011 Svenska Cupen =

Tournament details
- Country: Sweden
- Teams: 98

Final positions
- Champions: Helsingborgs IF
- Runners-up: Kalmar FF

The 2011 Svenska Cupen (English: Swedish Cup) was the 56th season of Svenska Cupen, the main Swedish football Cup. It began on 5 March 2011 with the first match of the preliminary round and ended on 5 November with the Final. Helsingborgs IF won the cup after beating Kalmar FF 3–1 in the final, Helsingborg were also the defending champions. The winners of this competition earned a place in the second qualifying round of the 2012–13 UEFA Europa League, however the second round spot was awarded to Allsvenskan runners-up AIK since Helsingborg were already qualified for European cup play, Kalmar FF who were the runners-up of the cup were awarded AIKs previous qualification spot in the first round.

== Teams ==
Round	Clubs remaining	Clubs involved	Winners from previous round	New entries this round	Leagues entering at this round
Preliminary round	98	52	none	52	Division 1 Norra; Division 1 Södra; Division 2 Division 3 Division 4 Division 5
Round 1	72	48	26	22	Superettan (7 teams); 15 teams from Division 1, 2 and 3
Round 2	48	32	24	8	Superettan (8 teams)
Round 3	32	32	16	16	Allsvenskan
Round 4	16	16	16	none	none
Quarter-finals	8	8	8	none	none
Semi-finals	4	4	4	none	none
Final	2	2	2	none	none

== Preliminary round ==
52 teams from Division 1 2011 or lower of the Swedish league pyramid competed in this round. The matches took place between 5–26 March 2011.

Team 1	Score	Team 2
5 March 2011
BKV Norrtälje	4–4 (aet); 7–6 (p)	IK Frej
12 March 2011
Onsala BK	1–0	Dalstorps IF
IFK Hässleholm	4–3 (aet)	Ljungby IF
13 March 2011
Melleruds IF	3–0	Carlstad United BK
15 March 2011
Nyköpings BIS	3–3 (aet); 3–5 (p)	Sollentuna United FF
16 March 2011
Friska Viljor FC	4–0	Kubikenborgs IF
17 March 2011
Skogsbo-Avesta IF	0–4	Sandvikens IF
19 March 2011
Svärtinge SK	1–9	Enskede IK
IFK Mariestad	8–0	Axbergs IF
Stångenäs AIS	4–2	Gunnilse IS
Värmbols FC	1–2	Hammarby TFF
KB Karlskoga FF	0–1	Skövde AIK
Rotebro IS FF	1–2	Akropolis IF
Älmhults IF	1–0	Malmö City FC
IFK Trelleborg	0–1 (aet)	Högaborgs BK
IFK Skövde FK	2–4	Karlslunds IF HFK
Islingby IK	0–4	Hudiksvalls ABK
Galtabäcks BK	0–9	Alingsås IF
Lindsdals IF	2–3	Kristianstads FF
20 March 2011
FC Gute	0–3	IK Sirius
Älvsborgs FF	1–3	IFK Fjärås
Bele Barkarby FF	1–1 (aet); 3–5 (p)	Vasalunds IF
Spårvägens FF	0–3	Valsta Syrianska IK
Robertsfors IK	1–2	IFK Luleå
Nässjö FF	2–2 (aet); 4–5 (p)	Sandareds IF
26 March 2011
Skellefteå FF	2–1	Bodens BK

== Round 1 ==
Twelve teams from Division 1 2011 or lower, two of three teams which earned promotion to Superettan 2011 (not Qviding FIF) and the bottom eight teams from Superettan 2010 entered in this round. They were joined by the 26 preliminary round winners. The matches of this round took place between 16 March–5 April 2011.

Team 1	Score	Team 2
16 March 2011
Höllvikens GIF	1–5	Ängelholms FF
20 March 2011
GIF Nike	1–4	Lunds BK
22 March 2011
Oskarshamns AIK	3–3 (aet); 4–3 (p)	Smedby AIS
24 March 2011
Onsala BK	0–3	Lindome GIF
Akropolis IF	3–3 (aet); 4–2 (p)	Valsta Syrianska IK
26 March 2011
Enskede IK	1–0	Hammarby TFF
IFK Mariestad	0–8	Degerfors IF
Kristianstads FF	0–3	IFK Värnamo
Vasalunds IF	4–0	Sollentuna United FF
Melleruds IF	1–6	Karlstad BK
BKV Norrtälje	2–1	IK Sleipner
Högaborgs BK	0–4	IF Limhamn Bunkeflo
Älmhults IF	1–0	Sölvesborgs GoIF
Hudiksvalls ABK	0–3	IK Brage
27 March 2011
IFK Fjärås	4–5	FC Trollhättan
IK Sirius	4–1	FC Väsby United
Stångenäs AIS	0–1	Örgryte IS
Karlslunds IF HFK	3–3 (aet); 7–6 (p)	Skövde AIK
Sandvikens IF	2–3	Västerås SK
28 March 2011
Sandareds IF	0–4	Jönköpings Södra IF
30 March 2011
IFK Hässleholm	1–5	Östers IF
Friska Viljor FC	1–6	Östersunds FK
31 March 2011
Alingsås IF	1–5	Torslanda IK
5 April 2011
Skellefteå FF	0–5	IFK Luleå

== Round 2 ==
Two demoted teams from Allsvenskan 2010 and six teams ranked 3rd through 8th in 2010 Superettan entered in this round, joining 24 winners from Round 1. The matches of this round took place between 6–27 April 2011.

Team 1	Score	Team 2
6 April 2011
BKV Norrtälje	1–0	Hammarby IF
7 April 2011
Oskarshamns AIK	1–2	IFK Värnamo
19 April 2011
FC Trollhättan	2–0	Degerfors IF
20 April 2011
IF Limhamn Bunkeflo	3–2	Ängelholms FF
Torslanda IK	0–3	Ljungskile SK
IFK Luleå	1–0	Assyriska FF
Östersunds FK	0–3	GIF Sundsvall
Örgryte IS	0–3	Falkenbergs FF
Lindome GIF	1–3	Jönköpings Södra IF
Karlstad BK	1–0	Västerås SK
Akropolis IF	1–4	IF Brommapojkarna
Enskede IK	3–4	Vasalunds IF
21 April 2011
IK Sirius	4–2 (aet)	IK Brage
Lunds BK	0–1	Landskrona BoIS
26 April 2011
Karlslunds IF HFK	0–4	Åtvidabergs FF
27 April 2011
Älmhults IF	0–2	Östers IF

== Round 3 ==
Sixteen teams from Allsvenskan 2011 entered in this round and joined the 16 winners of Round 2, the teams from Allsvenskan were seeded. The matches of this round took place on 10–18 May 2011. All times are in Central European Summer Time.

10 May 2011	Åtvidabergs FF	3–0	AIK	Åtvidaberg
19:30	Prodell 23'; Möller 90'; Radetinac 90+2'	Report		Stadium: Kopparvallen; Attendance: 1,815; Referee: Jim Petersson (Godegård)

11 May 2011	IFK Luleå	1–2	Djurgårdens IF	Luleå
18:00	Östlind 38'	Report	Sjölund 66'; Igboananike 87' (pen.)	Stadium: Skogsvallen; Attendance: 1,151; Referee: Lars Olsson (Umeå)

11 May 2011	Östers IF	0–0 (a.e.t.) (4–2 p)	BK Häcken	Växjö
19:00		Report		Stadium: Värendsvallen; Attendance: 540; Referee: Andreas Ekberg (Malmö)
	Penalties
	Borg (penalty scored); Velić (penalty scored); Bojent (penalty scored); Viðarsson (penalty scored)		(penalty scored) Chibuike; (penalty missed) Nyström; (penalty missed) Karlsson; (penalty scored) Bjurström

11 May 2011	Vasalunds IF	2–1	Mjällby AIF	Stockholm
19:30	Dincer 10'; Agai 27'	Report	E. Svensson 43'	Stadium: Skytteholms IP; Attendance: 296; Referee: Dragan Ganjac (Haninge)

11 May 2011	IK Sirius	0–1	Kalmar FF	Uppsala
19:00		Report	Santos 83'	Stadium: Studenternas IP; Attendance: 1,178; Referee: Fredrik Lundberg (Sundsvall)

11 May 2011	Falkenbergs FF	0–0 (a.e.t.) (4–2 p)	Syrianska FC	Falkenberg
19:00		Report		Stadium: Falkenbergs IP; Attendance: 249; Referee: Kristoffer Karlsson (Gothenburg)
	Penalties
	Översjö (penalty scored); Rodevåg (penalty scored); E. Johansson (penalty scored); Nilsson (penalty scored)		(penalty missed) Özdemirok; (penalty scored) Mete; (penalty scored) Durmaz; (penalty missed) George

11 May 2011	Ljungskile SK	2–2 (a.e.t.) (2–4 p)	Örebro SK	Ljungskile
19:00	Runnemo 11'; Magalhaes 79' (pen.)	Report	Yasin 12'; Nordback 43' (pen.)	Stadium: Starke Arvid Arena; Attendance: 246; Referee: Mattias Nyman (Kungsbacka)
	Penalties
	Magalhaes (penalty scored); Rodrígues (penalty missed); Thomas (penalty scored); Mellqvist (penalty missed)		(penalty scored) Johansson; (penalty missed) Astvald; (penalty scored) Nordback; (penalty scored) Staaf; (penalty scored) Bedoya

11 May 2011	Jönköpings Södra	0–4	Malmö FF	Jönköping
19:00		Report	Molins 44'; Mutavdžić 46'; Larsson 75'; Vinzents 89'	Stadium: Stadsparksvallen; Attendance: 2,476; Referee: Michael Lerjéus (Skövde)

12 May 2011	IF Limhamn Bunkeflo	2–6	IFK Göteborg	Malmö
18:15	Maxhuni 37'; Baqaj 75'	Report	Selaković 21'; Bärkroth 30', 52' (pen.); Hysén 63'; Drugge 73'; S. Eriksson 89'	Stadium: Limhamns IP; Attendance: 1,643; Referee: Martin Olsson (Alnarp)

12 May 2011	GIF Sundsvall	2–3 (a.e.t.)	GAIS	Östersund
19:00	Forsberg 57'; Skúlason 64'	Report	Unknown 37' (o.g.); Unknown 80' (o.g.); Mårtensson 108'	Stadium: Jämtkraft Arena; Attendance: 2,549; Referee: Niklas Abrahamsson (Sollefteå)

12 May 2011	FC Trollhättan	1–2	Trelleborgs FF	Trollhättan
19:00	Sköld 56'	Report	Adelstam 25', 83'	Stadium: Edsborgs IP; Attendance: 502; Referee: Bojan Pandzic (Gothenburg)

12 May 2011	IF Brommapojkarna	3–1	Gefle IF	Stockholm
19:00	Bahoui 34'; Jagne 45', 80'	Report	Orlov 75'	Stadium: Grimsta IP; Attendance: 297; Referee: Johan Hamlin (Bro)

12 May 2011	IFK Värnamo	0–1	IF Elfsborg	Värnamo
19:00		Report	Ericsson 33'	Stadium: Finnvedsvallen; Attendance: 1,772; Referee: Antti Kanerva (Olofstorp)

12 May 2011	Landskrona BoIS	2–4 (a.e.t.)	Helsingborgs IF	Landskrona
19:00	Raun 16'; Ralani 93'	Report	Sundin 55'; Gerndt 109' (pen.), 118'; Bengtsson 115' (o.g.)	Stadium: Landskrona IP; Attendance: 4,883; Referee: Martin Ingvarsson (Hässleholm)

12 May 2011	BKV Norrtälje	3–4	IFK Norrköping	Norrtälje
19:30	A. Bellander 29', 49'; Westlin 61'	Report	Santos 13', 55'; Telo 41'; Smedberg Dalence 90'	Stadium: Norrtälje Sportcentrum; Attendance: 1,022; Referee: Per Melin (Söderhamn)

18 May 2011	Karlstad BK	1–4	Halmstads BK	Karlstad
19:00	Feltsten 11'	Report	Rosén 56'; Zamora 66'; Hernández 80'; Olsson 90'	Stadium: Tingvalla IP; Attendance: 1,192; Referee: Johan Hamlin (Bro)

== Round 4 ==
The sixteen winning teams from round 3 entered in this round. The matches of this round took place on 29 May 2011. All times are in Central European Summer Time.

29 May 2011	Vasalunds IF	0–0 (a.e.t.) (4–5 p)	Falkenbergs FF	Stockholm
13:30		Report		Stadium: Skytteholms IP; Attendance: 312; Referee: Per Melin (Söderhamn)
	Penalties
	Olivera (penalty scored); Afshari (penalty scored); Jevtushenko (penalty scored); Dincer (penalty scored); Malmborg (penalty missed)		(penalty scored) Översjö; (penalty scored) Rodevåg; (penalty scored) P. Johansson; (penalty scored) Nilsson; (penalty scored) S. Andersson

29 May 2011	IF Elfsborg	3–1	IF Brommapojkarna	Borås
17:00	Nordmark 17'; Hult 75'; Larsson 90'	Report	Eriksson 53'	Stadium: Borås Arena; Attendance: 851; Referee: Bojan Pandzic (Gothenburg)

29 May 2011	IFK Norrköping	0–2	Kalmar FF	Norrköping
17:00		Report	Dauda 13'; Mendes 42'	Stadium: Idrottsparken; Attendance: 1,227; Referee: Niklas Abrahamsson (Sollefteå)

29 May 2011	Åtvidabergs FF	2–1	Östers IF	Åtvidaberg
17:00	Prodell 22', 23'	Report	Petersson 70'	Stadium: Kopparvallen; Attendance: 2,154; Referee: Kristoffer Karlsson (Gothenburg)

29 May 2011	Helsingborgs IF	2–1	Trelleborgs FF	Helsingborg
17:00	Nilsson 27' (pen.); Jönsson 41'	Report	Jensen 82'	Stadium: Olympia; Attendance: 3,081; Referee: Martin Ingvarsson (Hässleholm)

29 May 2011	Örebro SK	1–0	GAIS	Örebro
17:00	Astvald 54'	Report		Stadium: Behrn Arena; Attendance: 1,631; Referee: Michael Lerjéus (Skövde)

29 May 2011	Halmstad	0–3	Malmö FF	Halmstad
18:00		Report	Larsson 18'; Andersson 33'; Hamad 66'	Stadium: Örjans Vall; Attendance: 1,386; Referee: Martin Hansson (Holmsjö)

29 May 2011	IFK Göteborg	1–0	Djurgårdens IF	Gothenburg
18:00	Drugge 88'	Report		Stadium: Gamla Ullevi; Attendance: 3,887; Referee: Jim Petersson (Godegård)

== Quarter-finals ==
The four quarterfinal matches were originally scheduled to take place on 15 June.

15 June 2011	Kalmar FF	1–1 (a.e.t.) (4–3 p)	Malmö FF	Kalmar
19:00	Dauda 51'	Report	A. Nazari 64'	Stadium: Guldfågeln Arena; Attendance: 3,689; Referee: Martin Ingvarsson (Hässleholm)
	Penalties
	Rydström (penalty scored); Eriksson (penalty scored); Thorbjörnsson (penalty scored); Santos (penalty missed); Berisha (penalty scored)		(penalty scored) Larsson; (penalty scored) Ricardinho; (penalty missed) Durmaz; (penalty scored) Figueiredo; (penalty missed) Mutavdžić

15 June 2011	Åtvidabergs FF	0–3	Örebro SK	Åtvidaberg
19:00		Report	Wikström 45'; Wirtanen 88'; Staaf 90'	Stadium: Kopparvallen; Attendance: 2,016; Referee: Johan Hamlin (Bro)

21 July 2011	Falkenbergs FF	2–3	IFK Göteborg	Falkenberg
19:00	Översjö 20'; E. Johansson 21'	Report	Svensson 54'; Hysén 71'; Selaković 90'	Stadium: Falkenbergs IP; Attendance: 3,018; Referee: Martin Ingvarsson (Hässleholm)

29 September 2011	Helsingborgs IF	2−0	IF Elfsborg	Helsingborg
21:00	C. Andersson 42'; Thern 75'	Report		Stadium: Olympia; Attendance: 5,236; Referee: Martin Ingvarsson (Hässleholm)

== Semi-finals ==
Both semifinal matches were scheduled to take place on 29 June 2011. However, on that date one of the quarter-finals still hadn't been played, so the semifinal matches were pushed forward.

14 September 2011	IFK Göteborg	3–4 (a.e.t.)	Kalmar FF	Gothenburg
18:30	Söder 71'; Stiller 90', 112'	Report	Israelsson 12', 102'; Nouri 32'; Carlsson 118'	Stadium: Gamla Ullevi; Attendance: 7,145; Referee: Martin Hansson (Holmsjö)

29 October 2011	Örebro SK	1−3	Helsingborgs IF	Örebro
14:00	Paulinho 84'	Report	Santos 13'; Haginge 62' (o.g.); Bouaouzan 77'	Stadium: Behrn Arena; Attendance: 2,754; Referee: Martin Hansson (Holmsjö)

== Final ==
The final was played on 5 November 2011.

5 November 2011
15:30

Helsingborgs IF	3−1	Kalmar FF
Santos 26'; Mahlangu 55'; C. Andersson 80' (pen.)	Report	Israelsson 45'

Olympia, Helsingborg
Attendance: 9,513
Referee: Markus Strömbergsson (Gävle)
