= 2011 IFK Göteborg season =

IFK Göteborg
2011 season
- Chairman: Kent Olsson
- Head coach: Jonas Olsson
- Stadium: Gamla Ullevi
- Allsvenskan: 7th
- Svenska Cupen: Semi-finals
- Top goalscorer: League: Tobias Hysén (16); All: Tobias Hysén (18)
- Highest home attendance: 17,888 vs. GAIS (9 May 2011, Allsvenskan)
- Lowest home attendance: 3,887 vs. Djurgårdens IF (29 May 2011, Svenska Cupen); Allsvenskan: 6,149 vs. IFK Norrköping (23 October 2011)
- Average home league attendance: 10,849
Home colours	Away colours

The 2011 season was IFK Göteborg's 106th in existence, their 79th season in Allsvenskan and their 35th consecutive season in the league. They competed in Allsvenskan where they finished seventh for the second time in a row and Svenska Cupen where they were knocked out in the semi-finals.

== Players ==
=== Squad ===
Note: Flags indicate national team as defined under FIFA eligibility rules; some limited exceptions apply. Players may hold more than one non-FIFA nationality.

No.	Pos.	Nation	Player
1	GK	SWE	Marcus Sandberg
2	DF	SWE	Karl Svensson
3	DF	ISL	Logi Valgarðsson
4	FW	SWE	Andreas Drugge
5	MF	SWE	Philip Haglund
6	DF	SWE	Adam Johansson (captain)
7	FW	SWE	Tobias Hysén
8	MF	SWE	Thomas Olsson
8	DF	SWE	Emil Salomonsson
9	MF	SWE	Stefan Selaković (vice captain)
10	DF	ISL	Ragnar Sigurðsson
11	FW	SWE	Robin Söder
14	DF	ISL	Hjálmar Jónsson

No.	Pos.	Nation	Player
15	MF	SWE	Jakob Johansson
16	DF	SWE	Erik Lund
18	FW	SWE	Pär Ericsson
19	FW	SWE	Hannes Stiller
20	MF	SWE	Alexander Faltsetas
21	FW	SWE	Nicklas Bärkroth
22	MF	SWE	Tobias Sana
23	MF	SWE	Sebastian Eriksson
24	DF	SWE	Mikael Dyrestam
25	GK	SWE	Erik Dahlin
27	MF	SWE	Joel Allansson
28	MF	ISL	Elmar Bjarnason
29	MF	SWE	Kamal Mustafa

==== Youth players with first-team appearances ====
Youth players who played a competitive match for the club in 2011.

Note: Flags indicate national team as defined under FIFA eligibility rules; some limited exceptions apply. Players may hold more than one non-FIFA nationality.

No. / Pos. / Nation / Player; 13 / FW / SWE / David Moberg Karlsson	No. / Pos. / Nation / Player; 20 / FW / NGA / Lawal Ismail

=== Players in and out ===
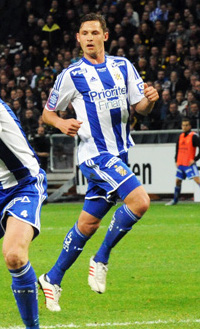
Midfielder Philip Haglund joined IFK Göteborg on a three and a half year contract.

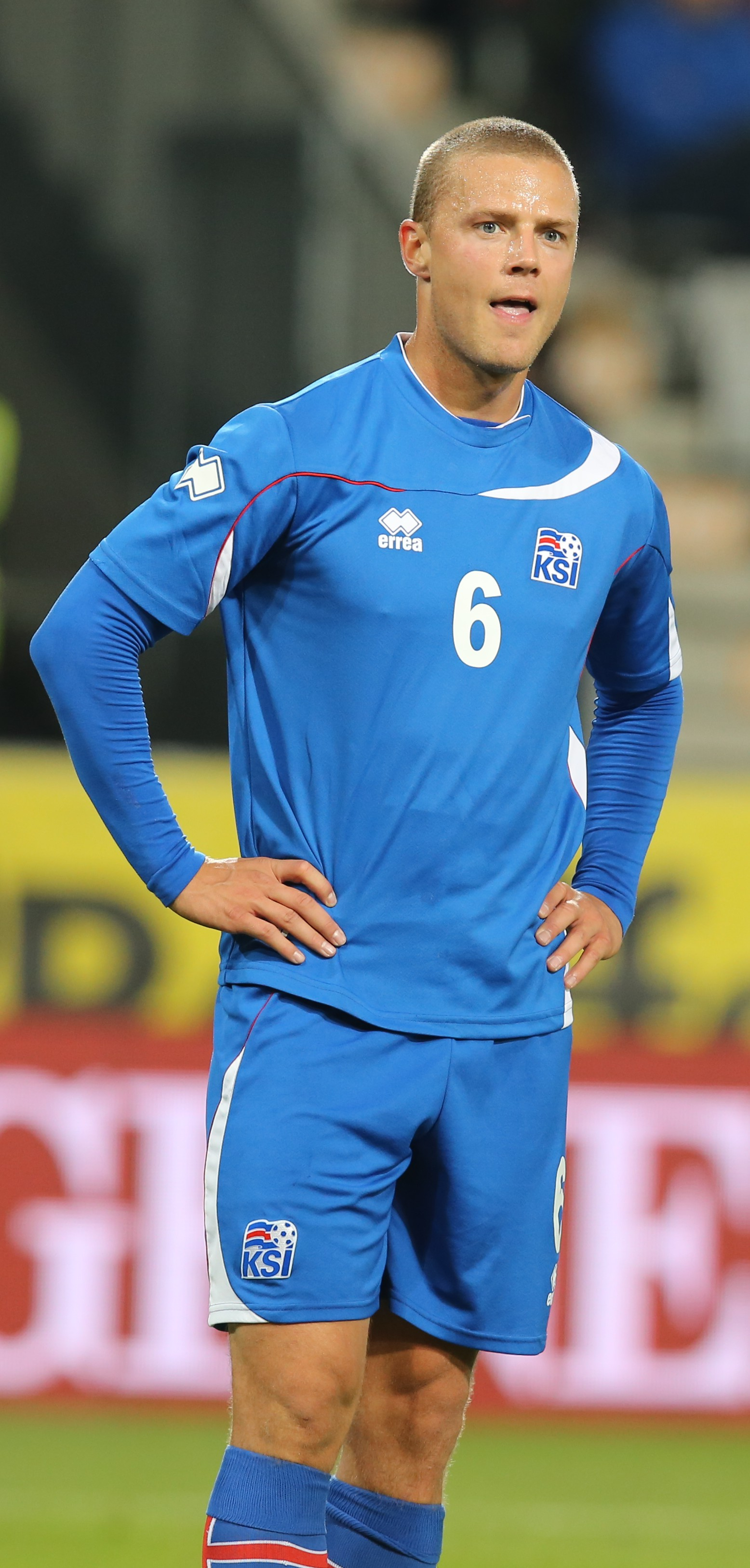
Defender Ragnar Sigurðsson left the club for Copenhagen after four and a half seasons.

==== In ====
No.	Pos.	Nat.	Name	Age	Moving from	Type	Transfer window	Ends	Transfer fee	Source
—	GK	(Sweden)	David Asmar	20	Assyriska BK	Loan return	Winter	2010	—	fotbolltransfers.com
5	DF	(Finland)	Tuomo Turunen	23	Trelleborgs FF	Loan return	Winter	2012	—	fotbolltransfers.com
29	MF	(Sweden)	Kamal Mustafa	19	Youth system	Promoted	Winter	2011	—	ifkgoteborg.se
4	FW	(Sweden)	Andreas Drugge	27	Trelleborgs FF	Bosman	Winter	2013	Free	ifkgoteborg.se
3	DF	(Iceland)	Logi Valgarðsson	22	FH	Transfer	Winter	2014	Undisclosed	ifkgoteborg.se
27	MF	(Sweden)	Joel Allansson	18	Youth system	Promoted	Summer	2015	—	ifkgoteborg.se
5	MF	(Sweden)	Philip Haglund	24	Heerenveen	Transfer	Summer	2014	Undisclosed	ifkgoteborg.se
8	DF	(Sweden)	Emil Salomonsson	22	Halmstads BK	Transfer	Summer	2015	Undisclosed	ifkgoteborg.se

==== Out ====
No.	Pos.	Nat.	Name	Age	Moving to	Type	Transfer window	Transfer fee	Source
3	DF	(Sweden)	Nicklas Carlsson	31	IF Brommapojkarna	End of contract	Winter	Free	ifkgoteborg.se
4	DF	(Sweden)	Petter Björlund	21	Utsiktens BK	End of contract	Winter	Free	ifkgoteborg.se
—	GK	(Sweden)	David Asmar	20	Assyriska BK	End of contract	Winter	Free	fotbolltransfers.com
5	DF	(Finland)	Tuomo Turunen	23	Trelleborgs FF	Transfer	Winter	Undisclosed	ifkgoteborg.se
10	DF	(Iceland)	Ragnar Sigurðsson	25	Copenhagen	Transfer	Summer	(~ 7.0M SEK)	ifkgoteborg.se
21	FW	(Sweden)	Nicklas Bärkroth	19	IF Brommapojkarna	Loan	Summer	—	ifkgoteborg.se
18	FW	(Sweden)	Pär Ericsson	23	Mjällby AIF	Loan	Summer	—	ifkgoteborg.se
8	MF	(Sweden)	Thomas Olsson	35	Åtvidabergs FF	Loan	Summer	—	ifkgoteborg.se
20	MF	(Sweden)	Alexander Faltsetas	24	IK Brage	Loan	Summer	—	ifkgoteborg.se
23	MF	(Sweden)	Sebastian Eriksson	22	Cagliari	Loan	Summer	—	ifkgoteborg.se

== Squad statistics ==
=== Appearances and goals ===
Number	Position	Name	2011 Allsvenskan		2011 Svenska Cupen		Total	
Number	Position	Name	Appearances	Goals	Appearances	Goals	Appearances	Goals
1	GK	Marcus Sandberg	17	0	3	0	20	0
2	DF	Karl Svensson	18	0	2	1	20	1
3	DF	Logi Valgarðsson	18	0	3	0	21	0
4	FW	Andreas Drugge	23	1	4	2	27	3
5	MF	Philip Haglund	10	1	1	0	11	1
6	DF	Adam Johansson	15	0	1	0	16	0
7	FW	Tobias Hysén	29	16	3	2	32	18
8	DF	Emil Salomonsson	6	1	1	0	7	1
9	MF	Stefan Selaković	19	7	3	2	22	9
11	FW	Robin Söder	18	0	3	1	21	1
13	FW	David Moberg Karlsson	2	0	0	0	2	0
14	DF	Hjálmar Jónsson	21	0	3	0	24	0
15	MF	Jakob Johansson	20	2	3	0	23	2
16	DF	Erik Lund	19	0	3	0	22	0
19	FW	Hannes Stiller	28	7	3	2	31	9
20	FW	Lawal Ismail	1	0	0	0	1	0
22	MF	Tobias Sana	26	0	3	0	29	0
24	DF	Mikael Dyrestam	20	1	2	0	22	1
25	GK	Erik Dahlin	13	0	1	0	14	0
27	MF	Joel Allansson	17	0	3	0	20	0
28	MF	Elmar Bjarnason	27	0	4	0	31	0
29	MF	Kamal Mustafa	0	0	0	0	0	0
Players that left the club during the season
8	MF	Thomas Olsson	1	0	0	0	1	0
10	DF	Ragnar Sigurðsson	13	3	2	1	15	4
18	FW	Pär Ericsson	4	0	0	0	4	0
20	MF	Alexander Faltsetas	1	0	0	0	1	0
21	FW	Nicklas Bärkroth	10	1	2	1	12	2
23	MF	Sebastian Eriksson	13	2	3	1	16	3

=== Disciplinary record ===
N	P	Nat.	Name	Allsvenskan			Svenska Cupen			Total			Notes
N	P	Nat.	Name	Yellow card	Second yellow card	Red card	Yellow card	Second yellow card	Red card	Yellow card	Second yellow card	Red card	Notes
2	DF	(Sweden)	Karl Svensson	4	1					4	1		
3	DF	(Iceland)	Logi Valgarðsson				1			1			
5	MF	(Sweden)	Philip Haglund	3						3			
6	DF	(Sweden)	Adam Johansson	2						2			
7	FW	(Sweden)	Tobias Hysén	2						2			
9	MF	(Sweden)	Stefan Selaković	4			1			5			
10	DF	(Iceland)	Ragnar Sigurðsson	1						1			
11	FW	(Sweden)	Robin Söder	1			2			3			
14	DF	(Iceland)	Hjálmar Jónsson	2			1			3			
15	MF	(Sweden)	Jakob Johansson	6						6			
16	DF	(Sweden)	Erik Lund	7						7			
19	FW	(Sweden)	Hannes Stiller	2						2			
22	MF	(Sweden)	Tobias Sana	4						4			
23	MF	(Sweden)	Sebastian Eriksson	4				1		4	1		
24	DF	(Sweden)	Mikael Dyrestam	1						1			
27	MF	(Sweden)	Joel Allansson	1						1			
28	MF	(Iceland)	Elmar Bjarnason	9			1			10			

Source: ifkgoteborg.se
Only competitive matches
(yellow card) = Number of bookings; (second yellow card) = Number of sending offs after a second yellow card; (red card) = Number of sending offs by a direct red card.

== Club ==
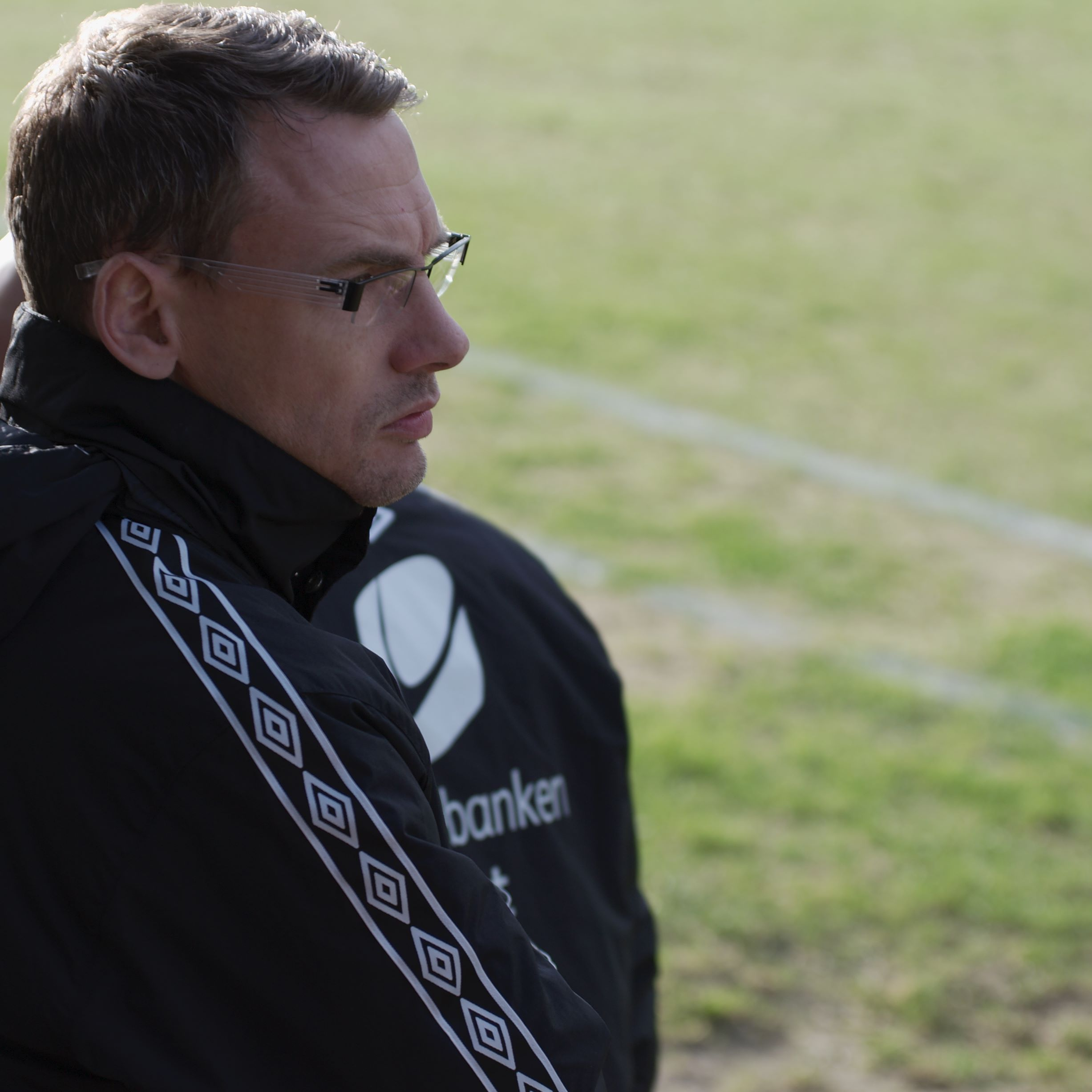
The 2011 season was Jonas Olsson's fifth and last season with IFK Göteborg.

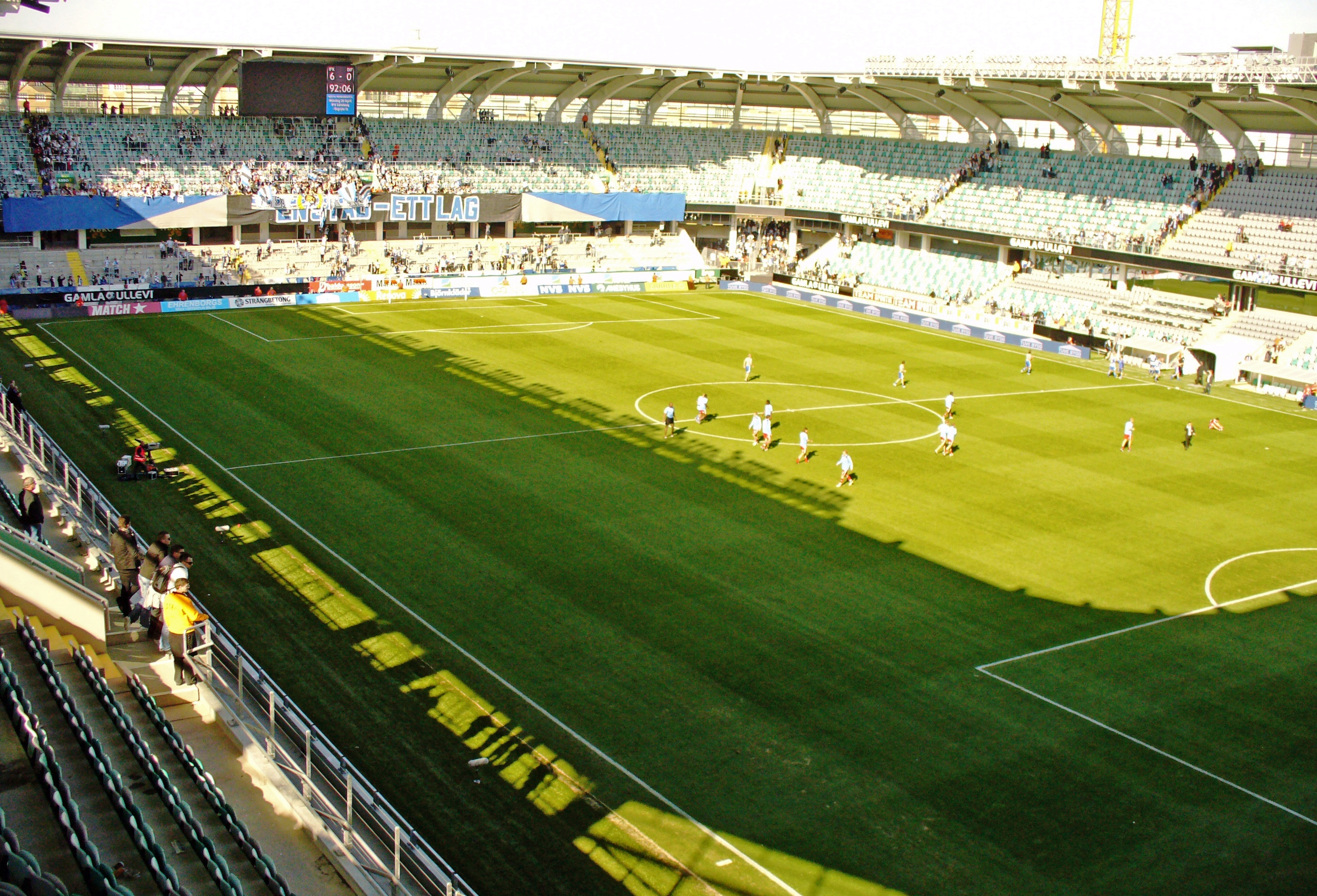
Gamla Ullevi was the third largest stadium in Allsvenskan in 2011.

=== Coaching staff ===
Name	Role
(Sweden) Jonas Olsson	Head coach
(Sweden) Stefan Rehn	Assistant coach
(Sweden) Teddy Olausson	Assistant coach / U21 head coach
(Sweden) Jonas Hellberg	Fitness coach
(Sweden) Stefan Remnér	Goalkeeping coach
(Sweden) Fredrik Larsson	Physiotherapist
(Sweden) Jon Karlsson	Club doctor
(Sweden) Leif Swärd	Club doctor
(Sweden) Vahid Hamidy	Club doctor
(Sweden) Johan Örtendahl	Mental coach
(Sweden) Bertil Lundqvist	Equipment manager
(Sweden) Eijlert Björkman	U19 head coach
(Sweden) Jens Wålemark	U19 assistant coach
(Sweden) Roger Gustafsson	Head coach youth academy
(Sweden) Olle Sultan	Head scout

=== Other information ===
Chairman	(Sweden) Kent Olsson
Club director	(Sweden) Seppo Vaihela
Director of sports	(Sweden) Håkan Mild
Ground (capacity and dimensions)	Gamla Ullevi (18,900 / 105x68 m)

Source: IFK Göteborg and Gamla Ullevi

== Competitions ==
=== Overall ===
Competition	Started round	Final position / round	First match	Last match
Allsvenskan	N/A	7th	4 April 2011	23 October 2011
Svenska Cupen	Round 3	Semi-finals	12 May 2011	14 September 2011

Source: Competitions

=== Allsvenskan ===
==== League table ====
Pos	Team	Pld	W	D	L	GF	GA	GD	Pts	Qualification or relegation
5	GAIS	30	16	3	11	47	34	+13	51	
6	BK Häcken	30	14	7	9	52	32	+20	49	
7	IFK Göteborg	30	13	6	11	42	34	+8	45	
8	Kalmar FF	30	13	5	12	39	34	+5	44	Qualification to Europa League first qualifying round (Note: AIK qualified for the second qualifying round of the UEFA Europa League as they received the qualifying spot reserved for the winner of 2011 Svenska Cupen, as cup winner Helsingborg were already qualified to the UEFA Champions League through winning Allsvenskan. Kalmar FF, Svenska Cupen runners-up 2011, qualified for the first qualifying round of the UEFA Europa League.)
9	Gefle IF	30	10	11	9	31	39	−8	41	

Source: svenskfotboll.se (in Swedish)
Rules for classification: 1) points; 2) goal difference; 3) number of goals scored.

==== Results summary ====
Overall								Home						Away					
Pld	W	D	L	GF	GA	GD	Pts	W	D	L	GF	GA	GD	W	D	L	GF	GA	GD
30	13	6	11	42	34	+8	45	7	4	4	24	15	+9	6	2	7	18	19	−1

Source: svenskfotboll.se (in Swedish)

==== Results by round ====
Round	1	2	3	4	5	6	7	8	9	10	11	12	13	14	15	16	17	18	19	20	21	22	23	24	25	26	27	28	29	30
Ground	H	A	H	A	H	A	H	A	H	A	H	A	H	A	A	H	A	H	A	H	A	H	A	H	A	H	A	H	A	H
Result	L	L	L	L	W	W	W	D	D	W	L	W	D	L	W	W	L	W	L	W	L	W	D	D	W	D	W	L	L	W
Position	13	14	15	16	14	13	12	11	12	8	11	9	10	10	9	9	9	8	8	7	8	7	7	7	7	7	7	7	7	7

Source: see below
A = Away; H = Home; W = Win; D = Draw; L = Loss

==== Matches ====
Kickoff times are in UTC+2.

4 April 2011 Round 1	IFK Göteborg	0–1	Örebro SK	Gothenburg
19:00		Report	Haddad 74'	Stadium: Gamla Ullevi; Attendance: 14,053; Referee: Daniel Stålhammar (Landskrona)

10 April 2011 Round 2	BK Häcken	3–1	IFK Göteborg	Gothenburg
16:30	Bjurström 48'; Makondele 55'; Ranégie 64'	Report	Hysén 31'	Stadium: Rambergsvallen; Attendance: 7,468; Referee: Michael Lerjéus (Skövde)

18 April 2011 Round 3	IFK Göteborg	1–2	Helsingborgs IF	Gothenburg
19:00	Drugge 23'	Report	Larsson 73'; Gerndt 90'	Stadium: Gamla Ullevi; Attendance: 11,555; Referee: Stefan Johannesson (Täby)

21 April 2011 Round 4	AIK	2–0	IFK Göteborg	Solna
19:00	Johansson 17'; T. Bangura 57'	Report		Stadium: Råsunda Stadium; Attendance: 17,375; Referee: Stefan Johannesson (Täby)

25 April 2011 Round 5	IFK Göteborg	2–0	Kalmar FF	Gothenburg
15:00	Hysén 41'; Bärkroth 90+2'	Report		Stadium: Gamla Ullevi; Attendance: 10,072; Referee: Michael Lerjéus (Skövde)

2 May 2011 Round 6	Malmö FF	0–2	IFK Göteborg	Malmö
20:00		Report	Hysén 31', 66'	Stadium: Swedbank Stadion; Attendance: 17,221; Referee: Martin Hansson (Holmsjö)

9 May 2011 Round 7	IFK Göteborg	2–1	GAIS	Gothenburg
19:00	J. Johansson 21'; Hysén 51'	Report	Çelik 10'	Stadium: Gamla Ullevi; Attendance: 17,888; Referee: Stefan Johannesson (Täby)

15 May 2011 Round 8	IFK Norrköping	2–2	IFK Göteborg	Norrköping
16:30	Þorvaldsson 1', 20'	Report	Hysén 14'; Sigurðsson 42'	Stadium: Nya Parken; Attendance: 10,023; Referee: Markus Strömbergsson (Gävle)

22 May 2011 Round 9	IFK Göteborg	1–1	Trelleborgs FF	Gothenburg
14:00	Sigurðsson 85'	Report	Adelstam 47'	Stadium: Gamla Ullevi; Attendance: 8,317; Referee: Andreas Ekberg (Lund)

26 May 2011 Round 10	Halmstads BK	1–2	IFK Göteborg	Gothenburg
19:00	Görlitz 61'	Report	Hysén 8', 81'	Stadium: Gamla Ullevi; Attendance: 5,621; Referee: Markus Strömbergsson (Gävle)

13 June 2011 Round 11	IFK Göteborg	0–4	Djurgårdens IF	Gothenburg
19:00		Report	Youssef 25'; Jonson 42'; Hämäläinen 59'; Hellquist 87'	Stadium: Gamla Ullevi; Attendance: 10,892; Referee: Tobias Mattsson (Karlstad)

18 June 2011 Round 12	Mjällby AIF	0–2	IFK Göteborg	Hällevik
18:00		Report	Sigurðsson 7' (pen.); Hysén 10'	Stadium: Strandvallen; Attendance: 4,871; Referee: Jonas Eriksson (Sigtuna)

22 June 2011 Round 13	IFK Göteborg	1–1	IF Elfsborg	Gothenburg
19:00	Stiller 70'	Report	Jawo 29'	Stadium: Gamla Ullevi; Attendance: 14,885; Referee: Martin Hansson (Holmsjö)

26 June 2011 Round 14	Gefle IF	1–0	IFK Göteborg	Gävle
19:00	Dahlberg 26'	Report		Stadium: Strömvallen; Attendance: 6,512; Referee: Jonas Eriksson (Sigtuna)

2 July 2011 Round 15	Syrianska FC	1–2	IFK Göteborg	Södertälje
16:00	Touma 54'	Report	Dyrestam 30'; Stiller 70'	Stadium: Södertälje Fotbollsarena; Attendance: 2,539; Referee: Johan Hamlin (Bro)

10 July 2011 Round 16	IFK Göteborg	3–0	Syrianska FC	Gothenburg
16:30	Selaković 72' (pen.), 87', 90+1'	Report		Stadium: Gamla Ullevi; Attendance: 9,832; Referee: Martin Strömbergsson (Gävle)

18 July 2011 Round 17	Trelleborgs FF	2–0	IFK Göteborg	Trelleborg
19:00	Adelstam 18'; Pode 47'	Report		Stadium: Vångavallen; Attendance: 3,820; Referee: Andreas Ekberg (Lund)

25 July 2011 Round 18	IFK Göteborg	3–1	Halmstads BK	Gothenburg
19:00	Hysén 16', 38', 56'	Report	Salomonsson 61' (pen.)	Stadium: Gamla Ullevi; Attendance: 10,023; Referee: Tobias Mattsson (Karlstad)

31 July 2011 Round 19	Helsingborgs IF	2–1	IFK Göteborg	Helsingborg
16:30	C. Andersson 69'; Mahlangu 75'	Report	Hysén 90+2'	Stadium: Olympia; Attendance: 12,783; Referee: Stefan Johannesson (Täby)

4 August 2011 Round 20	IFK Göteborg	3–1	AIK	Gothenburg
19:00	Selaković 5' (pen.); Eriksson 20'; Hysén 52'	Report	Bangura 2'	Stadium: Gamla Ullevi; Attendance: 13,918; Referee: Jonas Eriksson (Sigtuna)

15 August 2011 Round 21	IF Elfsborg	3–2	IFK Göteborg	Borås
19:00	Nilsson 2'; Svensson 68'; Elm 90+3'	Report	Eriksson 38'; J. Johansson 86'	Stadium: Borås Arena; Attendance: 15,722; Referee: Jonas Eriksson (Sigtuna)

22 August 2011 Round 22	IFK Göteborg	3–0	Gefle IF	Gothenburg
19:00	Stiller 17', 67'; Hysén 52'	Report		Stadium: Gamla Ullevi; Attendance: 7,152; Referee: Martin Ingvarsson (Hässleholm)

27 August 2011 Round 23	Kalmar FF	0–0	IFK Göteborg	Kalmar
16:00		Report		Stadium: Guldfågeln Arena; Attendance: 8,912; Referee: Stefan Johannesson (Täby)

11 September 2011 Round 24	IFK Göteborg	0–0	Malmö FF	Gothenburg
16:30		Report		Stadium: Gamla Ullevi; Attendance: 11,640; Referee: Markus Strömbergsson (Gävle)

18 September 2011 Round 25	Örebro SK	0–2	IFK Göteborg	Örebro
16:30		Report	Haglund 4'; Stiller 36'	Stadium: Behrn Arena; Attendance: 7,109; Referee: Daniel Stålhammar (Landskrona)

22 September 2011 Round 26	IFK Göteborg	2–2	BK Häcken	Gothenburg
19:00	Selaković 34', 77'	Report	Bjurström 45+1', 72'	Stadium: Gamla Ullevi; Attendance: 8,947; Referee: Michael Lerjéus (Skövde)

26 September 2011 Round 27	Djurgårdens IF	1–2	IFK Göteborg	Stockholm
19:00	Toivio 2'	Report	Selaković 52' (pen.); Stiller 73'	Stadium: Stockholms Stadion; Attendance: 6,426; Referee: Martin Hansson (Holmsjö)

1 October 2011 Round 28	IFK Göteborg	0–1	Mjällby AIF	Gothenburg
14:00		Report	Löfquist 88'	Stadium: Gamla Ullevi; Attendance: 7,407; Referee: Martin Strömbergsson (Gävle)

17 October 2011 Round 29	GAIS	1–0	IFK Göteborg	Gothenburg
19:00	Johansson 79'	Report		Stadium: Gamla Ullevi; Attendance: 15,530; Referee: Martin Hansson (Holmsjö)

23 October 2011 Round 30	IFK Göteborg	3–0	IFK Norrköping	Gothenburg
16:30	Salomonsson 22'; Hysén 57'; Stiller 70'	Report		Stadium: Gamla Ullevi; Attendance: 6,149; Referee: Michael Lerjéus (Skövde)

=== Svenska Cupen ===
Kickoff times are in UTC+2.

12 May 2011 Round 3	IF Limhamn Bunkeflo	2–6	IFK Göteborg	Malmö
18:15	Maxhuni 37'; Baqaj 75'	Report	Selaković 21'; Bärkroth 30'; Sigurðsson 52' (pen.); Hysén 63'; Drugge 73'; S. Eriksson 89'	Stadium: Limhamns IP; Attendance: 1,643; Referee: Martin Olsson (Lomma)

29 May 2011 Round 4	IFK Göteborg	1–0	Djurgårdens IF	Gothenburg
18:00	Drugge 86'	Report		Stadium: Gamla Ullevi; Attendance: 3,887; Referee: Jim Petersson (Motala)

21 July 2011 Quarter-finals	Falkenbergs FF	2–3	IFK Göteborg	Falkenberg
19:00	Översjö 20'; E. Johansson 21'	Report	Svensson 54'; Hysén 71'; Selaković 90'	Stadium: Falkenbergs IP; Attendance: 3,018; Referee: Martin Ingvarsson (Hässleholm)

14 September 2011 Semi-finals	IFK Göteborg	3–4 (a.e.t.)	Kalmar FF	Gothenburg
18:30	Söder 71'; Stiller 90', 110'	Report	Israelsson 12', 102'; Nouri 32'; Carlsson 118'	Stadium: Gamla Ullevi; Attendance: 7,145; Referee: Martin Hansson (Holmsjö)

== Non-competitive ==
=== Pre-season ===
Kickoff times are in UTC+1 unless stated otherwise.

19 January 2011 Friendly	Jönköpings Södra IF	1–4	IFK Göteborg	Jönköping, Sweden
18:00	Hrgota 55'	Report	Sana 16', 24', 30'; Bärkroth 63'	Stadium: Elmiahallen; Attendance: 834; Referee: Martin Hansson (Holmsjö)

28 January 2011 Copa del Sol; Round of 16	Tromsø IL (Norway)	0–2	(Sweden) IFK Göteborg	Elche, Spain
16:00		Report	Drugge 12'; Hysén 60'	Stadium: Estadio Manuel Martínez Valero

31 January 2011 Copa del Sol; Quarter-finals	IFK Göteborg (Sweden)	0–1	(Ukraine) Karpaty Lviv	La Manga, Spain
16:00		Report	Kuznetsov 54'	Stadium: La Manga Stadium

3 February 2011 Copa del Sol; Placement matches	Copenhagen (Denmark)	1–1 (1–3 p)	(Sweden) IFK Göteborg	La Manga, Spain
13:00	N'Doye 90+3'	Report	Wendt 82' (o.g.)	Stadium: La Manga Stadium; Attendance: 50; Referee: Espen Berntsen (Norway)
	Penalties
	Vingaard (penalty scored); T. Kristensen (penalty missed); Zohore (penalty missed); N'Doye (penalty missed)		(penalty scored) Svensson; (penalty scored) Hysén; (penalty missed) Bjarnason; (penalty scored) Jónsson

19 February 2011 Friendly	IFK Göteborg	0–2	Landskrona BoIS	Gothenburg, Sweden
14:00		Report	Raun 35'; Jónsson 64' (o.g.)	Stadium: Valhalla IP; Attendance: 2,667; Referee: Antti Kanerva (Olofstorp)

26 February 2011 Friendly	IFK Göteborg (Sweden)	1–2	(Denmark) OB	Gothenburg, Sweden
12:30	Valgarðsson 31'	Report	Andreasen 19', 86'	Stadium: Valhalla IP; Attendance: 1,492; Referee: Michael Lerjéus (Skövde)

4 March 2011 Friendly	IF Elfsborg	1–0	IFK Göteborg	Borås, Sweden
17:00	Keene 90+1'	Report		Stadium: Borås Arena; Attendance: 1,758; Referee: Håkan Grahn-Gustavsson (Jönköping)

8 March 2011 Friendly	Qviding FIF	1–1	IFK Göteborg	Gothenburg, Sweden
18:15	Hyseni 37'	Report	Bjarnason 23'	Stadium: Valhalla IP; Attendance: 782; Referee: Mattias Nyman (Kungsbacka)

14 March 2011 Friendly	IFK Göteborg (Sweden)	0–1	(Belarus) BATE Borisov	Antalya, Turkey
16:00 UTC+2		Report	Shitov 76'	Attendance: 57

17 March 2011 Friendly	IFK Göteborg (Sweden)	1–2	(Russia) Luch-Energiya Vladivostok	Antalya, Turkey
16:00 UTC+2	Hysén 60'	Report	Tikhonovetsky 77'; Udaly 90'	Attendance: 64

29 March 2011 Friendly	Ljungskile SK	0–1	IFK Göteborg	Ljungskile, Sweden
16:00 UTC+2		Report	Söder 67'	Stadium: H.A. Bygg Arena; Referee: Tobias Mattsson (Karlstad)
