= 2013 Copa del Sol =

Tournament details
- Country: Spain
- Dates: 23 January – 2 February
- Teams: 12

Final positions
- Champions: (Ukraine) Shakhtar Donetsk
- Runners-up: (Poland) Widzew Łódź

Tournament statistics
- Matches played: 19
- Goals scored: 51 (2.68 per match)
- Top goal scorer: (China) Wu Lei (Shanghai East Asia) (3 goals)

The 2013 Copa del Sol took place in La Manga Club and Pinatar (Region of Murcia, Spain) between 23 January and 2 February 2013. The final was between Shakhtar Donetsk and Widzew Łódź with Ukrainian club winning.

The tournament gives an opening to the newly constructed Pinatar Arena Football Center. Like in the previous edition, 12 teams are divided into two groups, the Red Group and the Blue Group.

== Group stage ==
=== Red Group ===
Team	Pld	W	WP	LP	L	GF	GA	GD	Pts
(Ukraine) Shakhtar Donetsk	3	3	0	0	0	5	1	+4	9
(Slovenia) Olimpija	3	1	1	1	0	3	1	+2	6
(Sweden) Göteborg	3	1	0	1	1	4	2	+2	4
(Russia) CSKA Moscow	3	1	0	0	2	3	4	−1	3
(Norway) Strømsgodset	3	1	0	0	2	3	7	−4	3
(Norway) Rosenborg	3	0	1	0	2	0	3	−3	2

24 January 2013
20:30 CET

Olimpija (Slovenia)	3–1	(Norway) Strømsgodset
Trifković 24'; Valenčič 30'; Nikezić 90' (pen.)	Report	Keita 64'

Pinatar Arena, San Pedro del Pinatar
Referee: Stefan Johannesson (Sweden)

25 January 2013
16:00 CET

CSKA Moscow (Russia)	2–0	(Norway) Rosenborg
Mamayev 19'; Tošić 70'	Report

La Manga Stadium, La Manga Club
Referee: Kristinn Jakobsson (Iceland)

25 January 2013
19:00 CET

Shakhtar Donetsk (Ukraine)	2–1	(Sweden) Göteborg
Rakitskiy 61'; Taison 85'	Report	Moberg Karlsson 72'

La Manga Stadium, La Manga Club
Referee: Ken Henry Johnsen (Norway)

28 January 2013
13:00 CET

Olimpija (Slovenia)	0–0	(Sweden) Göteborg
	Report
Penalties
Salkić (penalty scored); Trifković (penalty missed); Božič (penalty scored); Delamea (penalty scored)	3–2	(penalty scored) Hysén; (penalty scored) Gerzić; (penalty missed) Sobralense; (penalty missed) Augustinsson; (penalty missed) Bjärsmyr

La Manga Stadium, La Manga Club
Referee: Ransin Djurhuus (Faroe Islands)
28 January 2013
16:00 CET

CSKA Moscow (Russia)	1–2	(Norway) Strømsgodset
Oliseh 90'	Report	Diomande 6'; Wikheim 43'

La Manga Stadium, La Manga Club
Referee: Michael Johansen (Denmark)
28 January 2013
19:00 CET

Shakhtar Donetsk (Ukraine)	1–0	(Norway) Rosenborg
Douglas Costa 79'	Report

La Manga Stadium, La Manga Club
Referee: Mattias Gestranius (Finland)
31 January 2013
13:00 CET

Strømsgodset (Norway)	0–3	(Sweden) Göteborg
	Report	Haglund 28'; Hysén 33'; Söder 90+2'

La Manga Stadium, La Manga Club
Referee: Mattias Gestranius (Finland)
31 January 2013
16:00 CET

Shakhtar Donetsk (Ukraine)	2–0	(Russia) CSKA Moscow
Mkhitaryan 47'; Adriano 61'	Report

La Manga Stadium, La Manga Club
Referee: Ransin Djurhuus (Faroe Islands)
31 January 2013
19:00 CET

Olimpija (Slovenia)	0–0	(Norway) Rosenborg
	Report
Penalties
Salkić (penalty scored); Šporar (penalty scored); Valenčič (penalty scored); Mlinar (penalty scored); Zarifović (penalty scored); Kapun (penalty missed); Mitrović (penalty scored); Baskera (penalty scored); Džafić (penalty missed)	7–8	(penalty scored) Chibuike; (penalty scored) Sørloth; (penalty scored) Alas; (penalty scored) Dorsin; (penalty scored) Selnæs; (penalty missed) Rønning; (penalty scored) Høiland; (penalty scored) Moe; (penalty scored) Strand

La Manga Stadium, La Manga
Referee: Michael Johansen (Denmark)

=== Blue Group ===
Team	Pld	W	WP	LP	L	GF	GA	GD	Pts
(Poland) Widzew Łódź	3	2	1	0	0	6	3	+3	8
(China) Shanghai East Asia	3	2	0	0	1	7	5	+2	6
(Romania) Vaslui	3	1	1	0	1	3	6	−3	5
(Denmark) København	3	1	0	1	1	6	4	+2	4
(Norway) Molde	3	1	0	0	2	4	6	−2	3
(Norway) Tromsø	3	0	0	1	2	4	6	−2	1

23 January 2013
16:00 CET

Tromsø (Norway)	2–2	(Romania) Vaslui
Ondrášek 18', 24'	Report	Costin 49' (pen.); Antal 61'
Penalties
Skog (penalty scored); Prijović (penalty scored); Johnsen (penalty missed); Jenssen (penalty missed); Johansen (penalty scored)	3–4	(penalty missed) Jumisse; (penalty scored) Costin; (penalty scored) Charalambous; (penalty scored) Buhăescu; (penalty scored) Zsiga

La Manga Stadium, La Manga Club
Referee: Kristinn Jakobsson (Iceland)

23 January 2013
19:00 CET

Molde (Norway)	1–3	(Poland) Widzew Łódź
Hussain 54'	Report	M. Stępiński 58'; Nowak 61'; Kaczmarek 89'

La Manga Stadium, La Manga Club
Referee: Stefan Johannesson (Sweden)

24 January 2013
18:00 CET

Shanghai East Asia (China)	3–1	(Denmark) København
Lü Wenjun 5'; Dickson 27', 29'	Report	Gíslason 83'

Pinatar Arena, San Pedro del Pinatar
Referee: Ken Henry Johnsen (Norway)

26 January 2013
19:00 CET

Vaslui (Romania)	1–0	(Norway) Molde
Stanciu 36'	Report

Pinatar Arena, San Pedro del Pinatar
Referee: Kristinn Jakobsson (Iceland)

27 January 2013
13:00 CET

Shanghai East Asia (China)	2–1	(Norway) Tromsø
Zhu Zhengrong 30'; Wu Lei 77'	Report	Johansen 75'

Pinatar Arena, San Pedro del Pinatar
Referee: Kristinn Jakobsson (Iceland)

27 January 2013
16:00 CET

København (Denmark)	1–1	(Poland) Widzew Łódź
Delaney 83'	Report	Stępiński 58'
Penalties
Santin (penalty scored); Christensen (penalty scored); Jensen (penalty scored); Jakobsen (penalty missed); Sigurðsson (penalty scored); Vetokele (penalty scored); Frederiksen (penalty scored); Aaquist (penalty scored); Grindheim (penalty missed)	7–8	(penalty scored) Broź; (penalty scored) Rybicki; (penalty scored) Ben Dhifallah; (penalty scored) Abbès; (penalty missed) Batrovic; (penalty scored) Radzio; (penalty scored) Phibel; (penalty scored) Plotka; (penalty scored) Dragojevic

Pinatar Arena, San Pedro del Pinatar
Referee: Ken Henry Johnsen (Norway)

30 January 2013
13:00 CET

Molde (Norway)	3–2	(China) Shanghai East Asia
Simonsen 30'; Chima 48'; Hoseth 58' (pen.)	Report	Wu Lei 12', 81'

Pinatar Arena, San Pedro del Pinatar
Referee: Michael Johansen (Denmark)

30 January 2013
16:00 CET

Widzew Łódź (Poland)	2–1	(Norway) Tromsø
Dudek 61'; Rybicki 72'	Report	Prijović 56'

Pinatar Arena, San Pedro del Pinatar
Referee: Ransin Djurhuus (Faroe Islands)

30 January 2013
19:00 CET

Vaslui (Romania)	0–4	(Denmark) København
	Report	Aaquist 7'; Santin 12'; Vetokele 20', 38'

Pinatar Arena, San Pedro del Pinatar
Referee: Mattias Gestranius (Finland)

== Final ==
2 February 2013
16:00 CET

Shakhtar Donetsk (Ukraine)	2–1	(Poland) Widzew Łódź
Mkhitaryan 18'; Eduardo 82'	Report	Pawłowski 90+3'

La Manga Stadium, La Manga Club
Referee: Mattias Gestranius (Finland)

== Winners ==
Winners of the 2013 Copa del Sol
FC Shakhtar Donetsk

== Goalscorers ==
3 goals (1 player)

- (China) Wu Lei (Shanghai East Asia)

2 goals (5 players)

- (Belgium) Igor Vetokele (København)
- (Armenia) Henrikh Mkhitaryan (Shakhtar Donetsk)
- (Ghana) Chris Dickson (Shanghai East Asia)
- (Czech Republic) Zdeněk Ondrášek (Tromsø)
- (Poland) Mariusz Stępiński (Widzew Łódź)

1 goal (38 players)

- (Russia) Pavel Mamayev (CSKA Moscow)
- (Liberia) Sekou Oliseh (CSKA Moscow)
- (Serbia) Zoran Tošić (CSKA Moscow)
- (Sweden) Philip Haglund (Göteborg)
- (Sweden) Tobias Hysén (Göteborg)
- (Sweden) David Moberg Karlsson (Göteborg)
- (Sweden) Robin Söder (Göteborg)
- (Denmark) Mads Aaquist (København)
- (Denmark) Thomas Delaney (København)
- (Iceland) Rúrik Gíslason (København)
- (Brazil) César Santin (København)
- (Nigeria) Daniel Chima (Molde)
- (Norway) Magne Hoseth (Molde)
- (Norway) Etzaz Hussain (Molde)
- (Norway) Magne Simonsen (Molde)
- (Montenegro) Nikola Nikezić (Olimpija)
- (Slovenia) Damjan Trifković (Olimpija)
- (Slovenia) Filip Valenčič (Olimpija)
- (Brazil) Luiz Adriano (Shakhtar Donetsk)
- (Brazil) Douglas Costa (Shakhtar Donetsk)
- (Croatia) Eduardo (Shakhtar Donetsk)
- (Ukraine) Yaroslav Rakitskiy (Shakhtar Donetsk)
- (Brazil) Taison (Shakhtar Donetsk)
- (China) Lü Wenjun (Shanghai East Asia)
- (China) Zhu Zhengrong (Shanghai East Asia)
- (Norway) Adama Diomande (Strømsgodset)
- (Norway) Muhamed Keita (Strømsgodset)
- (Norway) Gustav Wikheim (Strømsgodset)
- (Norway) Remi Johansen (Tromsø)
- (Switzerland) Aleksandar Prijović (Tromsø)
- (Romania) Liviu Antal (Vaslui)
- (Romania) Raul Costin (Vaslui)
- (Romania) Nicolae Stanciu (Vaslui)
- (Poland) Sebastian Dudek (Widzew Łódź)
- (Poland) Marcin Kaczmarek (Widzew Łódź)
- (Poland) Krystian Nowak (Widzew Łódź)
- (Poland) Bartłomiej Pawłowski (Widzew Łódź)
- (Poland) Mariusz Rybicki (Widzew Łódź)
