= Branna =

Branna may refer to:

- Dolní Branná, village in the Hradec Králové Region of the Czech Republic
- Horní Branná, village and municipality in the Liberec Region of the Czech Republic
- Branná, village and municipality in the Olomouc Region of the Czech Republic
- Bränna, village in Mellerud Municipality, Västra Götaland County, Sweden
