= Åsebro IF =

Swedish football club

- Full name: Åsebro Idrottsförening
- Short name: ÅIS
- Founded: 1963
- Ground: Rudevi IP; Mellerud; Sweden
- Chairman: Thomas Sylveson
- Head coach: Peter Eriksson
- Coach: Per Aronsson
- League: Division 5 Dalsland
Home colours

Åsebro IF is a Swedish football club located in Mellerud.

== Background ==
Åsebro IF currently plays in Division 5 Bohuslän/Dalsland which is the seventh tier of Swedish football. They play their home matches at the Rudevi IP in Mellerud. Åsebro was founded 1963 as a conclusion of the three teams Bolstad GoIF, Grinstad IF and Erikstad GoSK.

The club is affiliated to Dalslands Fotbollförbund. Åsebro IF have competed in the Svenska Cupen on 18 occasions and have played 32 matches in the competition. They played in the 2010 Svenska Cupen but lost 0–2 at home to Utsiktens BK in the preliminary round.

== Season to season ==
Season	Level	Division	Section	Position	Movements
1964	Tier 6	Division 6	Dalslandsserien 1964	1st	Promotion
1965	Tier 5	Division 5	Dalslands Elitserie 1965	4th	
1966	Tier 5	Division 5	Dalslands Elitserie 1966	1st	Promotion
1967	Tier 4	Division 4	Bohuslän/Dalsland 1967	10th	Relegated
1968	Tier 5	Division 5	Dalslands Elitserie 1968	5th	
1969	Tier 5	Division 5	Dalslands Elitserie 1969	2nd	
1970	Tier 5	Division 5	Dalslands Elitserie 1970	5th	
1971	Tier 5	Division 5	Dalslands Elitserie 1971	4th	
1972	Tier 5	Division 5	Dalslands Elitserie 1972	9th	
1973	Tier 5	Division 5	Dalslands Elitserie 1973	3rd	
1974	Tier 5	Division 5	Dalslands Elitserie 1974	10th	
1975	Tier 5	Division 5	Dalslands Elitserie 1975	12th	Relegation
1976	Tier 6	Division 6	Dalslandsserien 1976	7th	
1977	Tier 6	Division 6	Dalslandsserien 1977	5th	
1978	Tier 6	Division 6	Dalslandsserien 1978	4th	
1979	Tier 6	Division 6	Dalslandsserien 1979	6th	
1980	Tier 6	Division 6	Dalslandsserien 1980	1st	Promotion
1981	Tier 5	Division 5	Dalslands Elitserie 1981	?th	
1982	Tier 5	Division 5	Dalslands Elitserie 1982	2nd	Promotion
1994	Tier 4	Division 4	Bohuslän/Dalsland 1983	7th	
1984	Tier 4	Division 4	Bohuslän/Dalsland 1984	7th	
1985	Tier 4	Division 4	Bohuslän/Dalsland 1985	9th	Relegated
1986	Tier 5	Division 5	Dalslandsserien 1986	?th	**
1987	Tier 6	Division 5	Dalslandsserien 1987	?th	
1988	Tier 6	Division 5	Dalslandsserien 1988	1st	Promotion
1989	Tier 5	Division 4	Bohuslän/Dalsland 1989	?th	
1990	Tier 5	Division 4	Bohuslän/Dalsland 1990	?th	
1991	Tier 5	Division 4	Bohuslän/Dalsland 1991	3rd	
1992	Tier 5	Division 4	Bohuslän/Dalsland 1992	3rd	
1993	Tier 5	Division 4	Bohuslän/Dalsland 1993	1st	Promotion
1994	Tier 4	Division 3	Nordvästra Götaland 1994	11th	Relegation
1995	Tier 5	Division 4	Bohuslän/Dalsland 1995	5th	
1996	Tier 5	Division 4	Bohuslän/Dalsland 1996	2nd	Promotion Playoffs
1997	Tier 5	Division 4	Bohuslän/Dalsland 1997	3rd	
1998	Tier 5	Division 4	Bohuslän/Dalsland 1998	2nd	Promotion Playoffs
1999	Tier 5	Division 4	Bohuslän/Dalsland 1999	7th	
2000	Tier 5	Division 4	Bohuslän/Dalsland 2000	2nd	Promotion Playoffs
2001	Tier 5	Division 4	Bohuslän/Dalsland 2001	1st	Promoted
2002	Tier 4	Division 3	Nordvästra Götaland 2002	6th	
2003	Tier 4	Division 3	Nordvästra Götaland 2003	6th	
2004	Tier 4	Division 3	Nordvästra Götaland 2004	8th	
2005	Tier 4	Division 3	Nordvästra Götaland 2005	7th	
2006*	Tier 5	Division 3	Nordvästra Götaland 2006	5th	
2007	Tier 5	Division 3	Nordvästra Götaland 2007	9th	Relegation Playoffs
2008	Tier 5	Division 3	Nordvästra Götaland 2008	8th	
2009	Tier 5	Division 3	Nordvästra Götaland 2009	9th	
2010	Tier 5	Division 3	Nordvästra Götaland 2010	12th	Relegated
2011	Tier 6	Division 4	Bohuslän/Dalsland 2011	5th	
2012	Tier 6	Division 4	Bohuslän/Dalsland 2012	5th	
2013	Tier 6	Division 4	Bohuslän/Dalsland 2013	5th	
2014	Tier 6	Division 4	Bohuslän/Dalsland 2014	10th	Withdrawn from league after season *
2015	Tier 8	Division 6	Dalsland 2015	1st	Promoted
2016	Tier 7	Division 5	Dalsland 2016	?th	

* League restructuring in 1987 resulted in a new division being created at 3rd level called division 2 and subsequent divisions dropping a level.

* League restructuring in 2006 resulted in a new division being created at Tier 3 and subsequent divisions dropping a level.

== Åsebro IF at the Svenska Cupen ==
Season	Round	Club	Score
1983/84	Kvalomg	Lidköpings IF	2–1
	1:a omg	Gunnilse IS	2–4
1984/85	Kvalomg 2	Fässbergs IF	1-3
1985/86	Kvalomg 2	IFK Falköping	0-3
1987/88	Kvalomg 2	Stenungsunds IF	0-5
1988/89	1:a omg	Grebbestads IF	3-2
	2:a omg	IK Kongahälla	2-4
1989/90	Kvalomg 2	IF Heimer	1-1 pen 4-5
1990/91	1:a omg	Sommaro IF Karlstad	1-0
	2:a omg	Grebbestads IF	3-1
	3:a omg	Ulvåkers IF	2-4 AET (2-2)
1991	Kvalomg 1	Säffle FF	3-2 AET (Golden Goal)
	Kvalomg 2	Henåns IF	2-0
	1:a omg	Qviding FIF	6-2
	2:a omg	Ulvåkers IF	0-3
1992/93	Kvalomg 1	Lerums IS	0-1
1993/94	Kvalomg 1	Öckerö IF	2-2 pen 4-5
1994/95	Kvalomg 1	Göteborg IF Väster	0-1
1996/97	Kvalomg 2	Falköpings FK	3-4 AET (Golden Goal)
1997/98	Kvalomg 1	Skogslunds IF	2-0
	Kvalomg 2	Högsäters GF	2-0
	2:a omg	IFK Göteborg	1-11
1998/99	Kvalomg 2	Kroppefjälls IF	8-1
	1:a omg	Falkenbergs FF	2-5
1999/00	Kvalomg 2	Säffle FF	0-3
2000/01	Kvalomg 2	Stenungsunds IF	2-1
	1:a omg	Dals-Långed IK	4-1
	2:a omg	Vänersborgs IF	2-1
	3:a omg	Degerfors IF	3-0
	4:a omg	Västra Frölunda IF	0-3
2009	Kvalomg	Karlstad BK	2-5
2010	Kvalomg	Utsiktens BK	0-2

== Players ==
=== 2016 club ===
Below is the roster for the 2016 club.

Number	Country	Player	Age	Came from	Mother club
Goalkeepers
1	(Sweden)	Björn Arvidsson	19		Åsebro IF
20	(Sweden)	Henrik Eriksson	28	Melleruds IF	Kroppefjälls IF
-	(Sweden)	Jamal Mohamad Haji	24		
Defensive
2	(Sweden)	Fredrik Bertilsson	28	Harlösa IF	Åsebro IF
3	(Sweden)	Oliver Broberg	25	Håfreströms IF	Åsebro IF
4	(Sweden)	Sven Crona	34	Gestad SK	Åsebro IF
5	(Sweden)	Hasan Ghali	34		Åsebro IF
8	(Sweden)	Wictor Eriksson	24		Åsebro IF
12	(Sweden)	Peter Andersson	34	Kroppefjälls IF	Åsebro IF
14	(Sweden)	Joakim Gullin	19	Kroppefjälls IF	Åsebro IF
16	(Sweden)	Jonatan Larsson	24	FC Trollhättan	Åsebro IF
-	(Sweden)	Kasper Landin	21		Åsebro IF
-	(Sweden)	Johan Sylvesson	20	Ljungskile SK	Åsebro IF
Midfielders
7	(Sweden)	Peter Eriksson	33	Upsala IF	Åsebro IF
9	(Sweden)	David Sylvesson	21		Lidköpings IF
11	(Sweden)	Jonatan Ugrell	19	Melleruds IF	Melleruds IF
17	(Sweden)	Marcus Larsson	24		Åsebro IF
-	(Sweden)	Robin Svensson	25		Melleruds IF
-	(Sweden)	Viktor Wänerlöv	22		Åsebro IF
-	(Sweden)	Ramiz Haji	23		
-	(Sweden)	Mohamed Hassen Shifa Mussa "Mido"	-		
Offense
10	(Sweden)	Martin Scherdin	39	FC Trollhättan	Åsebro IF
22	(Sweden)	Fredrik Grenander	30	Håfreströms IF	Melleruds IF

=== Coach ===
Club	Coach	Hired	Reference
-	Sweden Peter Eriksson	xx xxxx 2015	
