= 2011 Copa del Sol =

Tournament details
- Country: Spain
- Dates: 27 January – 7 February
- Teams: 16

Final positions
- Champions: (Ukraine) Karpaty Lviv
- Runners-up: (Ukraine) Shakhtar Donetsk

Tournament statistics
- Matches played: 24
- Goals scored: 65 (2.71 per match)
- Top goal scorer(s): 3 goals (Brazil) César Santin (Brazil) Douglas Costa (Romania) Costin Curelea

The 2011 Copa del Sol took place in Elche and La Manga, Spain between January 27 and February 7, 2011. The competition was played at La Manga Stadium and Estadio Martínez Valero along with various smaller training pitches for "loser games". Unlike the first edition of the tournament the format of the competition was played as a knockout tournament. The winner of the tournament was awarded €40,000 FC Karpaty Lviv won the tournament after beating FC Shakhtar Donetsk with 1–0 in the final.

== Bracket ==
Note: (Denmark) Copenhagen withdrew themselves from the tournament after the Quarter-finals. (Norway) Aalesund were drawn as Lucky Losers and went on into the Semi-Finals.

Round of 16
(Denmark) Copenhagen	5
(Norway) Vålerenga	1
(Norway) Aalesund	2
(Poland) Wisła Kraków	0
(Norway) Tromsø	0
(Sweden) IFK Göteborg	2
(Norway) Molde	1 (3)
(Ukraine) FC Karpaty Lviv (pen.)	1 (4)
(Norway) Rosenborg (pen.)	0 (5)
(Romania) Rapid Bucharest	0 (3)
(Sweden) Malmö FF	1
(Russia) Spartak Moscow	2
(Denmark) FC Nordsjælland	1
(Romania) Sportul Studenţesc	0
(Ukraine) Shakhtar Donetsk	2
(Czech Republic) Viktoria Plzeň	1

Quarter-finals
(Denmark) Copenhagen (pen.)	1 (5)
(Norway) Aalesund	1 (3)
(Sweden) IFK Göteborg	0
(Ukraine) FC Karpaty Lviv	1
(Norway) Rosenborg	4
(Russia) Spartak Moscow	0
(Denmark) FC Nordsjælland	1
(Ukraine) Shakhtar Donetsk	3

Semi-final
(Norway) Aalesund	1 (6)
(Ukraine) FC Karpaty Lviv (pen.)	1 (7)
(Norway) Rosenborg	1
(Ukraine) Shakhtar Donetsk	4

Final
(Ukraine) FC Karpaty Lviv	1
(Ukraine) Shakhtar Donetsk	0

== Round of 16 ==
27 January 2011
19.00

Copenhagen (Denmark)	5–1	(Norway) Vålerenga
Pospěch 11'; Santin 43', 64'; Grønkjær 48'; Zohore 86'		Berre 41'

La Manga Stadium, La Manga

27 January 2011
13.00

Aalesund (Norway)	2–0	(Poland) Wisła Kraków
Arnefjord 57'; Herrera 88'

La Manga Stadium, La Manga

28 January 2011
16.00

Tromsø (Norway)	0–2	(Sweden) IFK Göteborg
		Drugge 12'; Hysén 59'

Estadio Martínez Valero, Elche

28 January 2011
19.00

Molde (Norway)	1–1	(Ukraine) Karpaty Lviv
Angan 30'		Kozhanov 24' (pen.)
Penalties
Diouf (penalty scored); Steen (penalty scored); Angan (penalty scored); Ulvestad (penalty missed); Holm (penalty missed)	3–4	(penalty scored) Guruli; (penalty scored) Oshchypko; (penalty scored) Tkachuk; (penalty scored) Tubić

Estadio Martínez Valero, Elche

27 January 2011
16.00

Rosenborg (Norway)	0–0	(Romania) Rapid Bucharest
Penalties
Moldskred (penalty scored); Lustig (penalty scored); Bjärsmyr (penalty scored); Olsen (penalty scored); Åsen (penalty scored)	5–3	(penalty scored) Herea; (penalty missed) Constantin; (penalty scored) Grigore; (penalty scored) Frunză

La Manga Stadium, La Manga

29 January 2011
16.00

Malmö FF (Sweden)	1–2	(Russia) Spartak Moscow
Molins 23'		Halsti 25' (o.g.); Dzyuba 43'

Estadio Martínez Valero, Elche

28 January 2011
13.00

FC Nordsjælland (Denmark)	1–0	(Romania) Sportul Studenţesc
Gytkjær 73'

Estadio Martínez Valero, Elche

29 January 2011
19.00

Shakhtar Donetsk (Ukraine)	2–1	(Czech Republic) Viktoria Plzeň
Douglas Costa 81', 90'		Kolář 50'

Estadio Martínez Valero, Elche

== Quarter-finals ==
31 January 2011
19.00

Copenhagen (Denmark)	1–1	(Norway) Aalesund
Santin 4'		Sellin 62'
Penalties
Vingaard (penalty scored); T. Kristensen (penalty scored); Bengtsson (penalty scored); Zohore (penalty scored); Bergvold (penalty scored)	5–3	(penalty scored) Barrantes; (penalty missed) Jääger; (penalty scored) Fuhre; (penalty scored) Fløtre

La Manga Stadium, La Manga

31 January 2011
16.00

IFK Göteborg (Sweden)	0–1	(Ukraine) Karpaty Lviv
		Kuznetsov 54'

La Manga Stadium, La Manga

1 February 2011
16.00

Spartak Moscow (Russia)	0–4	(Norway) Rosenborg
		Moldskred 5'; Prica 15'; Jamtfall 32'; Olsen 74'

Estadio Martínez Valero, Elche

1 February 2011
18.45

Shakhtar Donetsk (Ukraine)	3–1	(Denmark) FC Nordsjælland
Mkhitaryan 27'; Teixeira 61'; Chyhrynskyi 79'		Lund 84'

Estadio Martínez Valero, Elche

== Placement matches ==
=== Round of 16 Losers ===
30 January 2011
19.00

Wisła Kraków (Poland)	0–4	(Norway) Vålerenga
		Berre 35'; Singh 45', 65'; Nielsen 60'

La Manga Stadium, La Manga

31 January 2011
13.00

Molde (Norway)	1–5	(Norway) Tromsø
Hoseth 56'		Johansen 15'; Møller 25'; Björck 31'; Knarvik 64'; Andersen 81'

La Manga Stadium, La Manga

1 February 2011
19.30

Rapid Bucharest (Romania)	0–0	(Sweden) Malmö FF
Penalties
Sburlea (penalty missed); Roman (penalty missed); Spadacio (penalty missed); Cássio (penalty scored)	1–3	(penalty scored) Andersson; (penalty scored) Hamad; (penalty missed) Figueiredo; (penalty scored) Ricardinho

La Manga Stadium, La Manga

1 February 2011
16.30

Sportul Studenţesc (Romania)	4–1	(Czech Republic) Viktoria Plzeň
Curelea 62', 82', 84'; Ferfelea 63'		Rezek 32'

La Manga Stadium, La Manga

==== Losers ====
3 February 2011
15.00

Wisła Kraków (Poland)	0–2	(Norway) Molde
		Diouf 44'; Eikrem 59'

Polideportivo, L'Alfàs del Pi

4 February 2011
16.00

Viktoria Plzeň (Czech Republic)	0–1	(Romania) Rapid Bucharest
		Herea 65' (pen.)

Oliva Nova Golf Hotel, Oliva

==== Winners ====
3 February 2011
16.00

Vålerenga (Norway)	0–2	(Norway) Tromsø
		Rushfeldt 45'; Knarvik 86'

La Manga Stadium, La Manga

4 February 2011
16.30

Malmö FF (Sweden)	0–1	(Romania) Sportul Studenţesc
		Maxim 53'

Benidorm, La Nucia

=== Quarter-finals losers ===
3 February 2011
13.00

Copenhagen (Denmark)	1–1	(Sweden) IFK Göteborg
N'Doye 90+3'		Wendt 83' (o.g.)
Penalties
Vingaard (penalty scored); T. Kristensen (penalty missed); Zohore (penalty missed); N'Doye (penalty missed)	1–3	(penalty scored) Svensson; (penalty scored) Hysén; (penalty missed) Bjarnason; (penalty scored) Jónsson

La Manga Stadium, La Manga

4 February 2011
16.00

FC Nordsjælland (Denmark)	0–4	(Russia) Spartak Moscow
		Alex 27', 48'; McGeady 61'; Ananidze 72'

La Manga Stadium, La Manga

== Semi-finals ==
Note: (Denmark) Copenhagen withdrew themselves from the tournament after the Quarter-finals. (Norway) Aalesund were drawn as Lucky Losers and went on into the Semi-Finals.

3 February 2011
18.45

Aalesund (Norway)	1–1	(Ukraine) Karpaty Lviv
Herrera 46'		Holodyuk 34'
Penalties
Barrantes (penalty scored); Fuhre (penalty scored); Fløtre (penalty scored); Herrera (penalty scored); Skiri (penalty scored); Skagestad (penalty scored); Tollås (penalty missed)	6–7	(penalty scored) Kozhanov; (penalty scored) Holodyuk; (penalty scored) Tkachuk; (penalty scored) Oshchypko; (penalty scored) Tubić; (penalty scored) Thiago; (penalty scored) Kopolovets

La Manga Stadium, La Manga

4 February 2011
19.00

Rosenborg (Norway)	1–4	(Ukraine) Shakhtar Donetsk
Åsen 66'		Adriano 4'; Douglas Costa 17'; Mkhitaryan 28'; Willian 73' (pen.)

Estadio Martínez Valero, Elche

== Final ==
7 February 2011
19.00

Karpaty Lviv (Ukraine)	1–0	(Ukraine) Shakhtar Donetsk
Khudobyak 59'

La Manga Stadium, La Manga

== Winner ==
Winner of the 2011 Copa del Sol
FC Karpaty Lviv

== Goalscorers ==
3 goals

- (Brazil) César Santin (Copenhagen)
- (Brazil) Douglas Costa (Shakhtar Donetsk)
- (Romania) Costin Curelea (Sportul Studenţesc)

2 goals

- (Costa Rica) Pablo Herrera Barrantes (Aalesund)
- (Armenia) Henrikh Mkhitaryan (Shakhtar Donetsk)
- (Brazil) Alex (Spartak Moscow)
- (Norway) Tommy Knarvik (Tromsø)
- (Norway) Morten Berre (Vålerenga)
- (Norway) Harmeet Singh (Vålerenga)

1 goal

- (Sweden) Daniel Arnefjord (Aalesund)
- (Norway) Kjell Rune Sellin (Aalesund)
- (Denmark) Jesper Grønkjær (Copenhagen)
- (Senegal) Dame N'Doye (Copenhagen)
- (Czech Republic) Zdeněk Pospěch (Copenhagen)
- (Denmark) Kenneth Zohore (Copenhagen)
- (Sweden) Andreas Drugge (IFK Göteborg)
- (Sweden) Tobias Hysén (IFK Göteborg)
- (Ukraine) Oleh Holodyuk (Karpaty Lviv)
- (Ukraine) Ihor Khudobyak (Karpaty Lviv)
- (Ukraine) Denys Kozhanov (Karpaty Lviv)
- (Ukraine) Serhiy Kuznetsov (Karpaty Lviv)
- (Sweden) Guillermo Molins (Malmö FF)
- (Ivory Coast) Davy Claude Angan (Molde)
- (Senegal) Pape Paté Diouf (Molde)
- (Norway) Magne Hoseth (Molde)
- (Norway) Magnus Wolff Eikrem (Molde)
- (Denmark) Christian Gytkjær (Nordsjælland)
- (Denmark) Matti Lund Nielsen (Nordsjælland)
- (Romania) Ovidiu Herea (Rapid Bucharest)
- (Norway) Gjermund Åsen (Rosenborg)
- (Norway) Michael Jamtfall (Rosenborg)
- (Norway) Morten Moldskred (Rosenborg)
- (Norway) Trond Olsen (Rosenborg)
- (Sweden) Rade Prica (Rosenborg)
- (Brazil) Luiz Adriano (Shakhtar Donetsk)
- (Ukraine) Dmytro Chyhrynskyi (Shakhtar Donetsk)
- (Brazil) Alex Teixeira (Shakhtar Donetsk)
- (Brazil) Willian (Shakhtar Donetsk)
- (Georgia (country)) Jano Ananidze (Spartak Moscow)
- (Russia) Artyom Dzyuba (Spartak Moscow)
- (Republic of Ireland) Aiden McGeady (Spartak Moscow)
- (Romania) Viorel Ferfelea (Sportul Studenţesc)
- (Romania) Florin Maxim (Sportul Studenţesc)
- (Norway) Magnus Andersen (Tromsø)
- (Sweden) Fredrik Björck (Tromsø)
- (Norway) Remi Johansen (Tromsø)
- (Norway) Simen Møller (Tromsø)
- (Norway) Sigurd Rushfeldt (Tromsø)
- (Norway) Håvard Nielsen (Vålerenga)
- (Czech Republic) Daniel Kolář (Viktoria Plzeň)
- (Czech Republic) Jan Rezek (Viktoria Plzeň)

Own goals

- (Sweden) Oscar Wendt (Copenhagen, playing against IFK Göteborg)
- (Finland) Markus Halsti (Malmö FF, playing against Spartak Moscow)

== Broadcasting rights ==
- Norway: TV 2
- Denmark: Canal 9
- Poland: Orange Sport
- Romania: Dolce Sport
- Russia: NTV+
- Sweden: TV4 Sport
- Ukraine: TK Football
- Africa: Setanta Sports

== See also ==
- 2010 Copa del Sol
