= Håfreströms IF =

Swedish football club

- Full name: Håfreströms Idrottsförening
- Founded: 1921; 105 years ago
- Ground: Dalslands Sparbank Arena, Mellerud
Home colours

Håfreströms IF is a Swedish football club located in Åsensbruk.
