= Dalslands Fotbollförbund =

Association football district association in Sweden

- Abbreviation: Dalslands FF
- Purpose: District Football Association
- Location(s): Backegatan 13 C 46430 Mellerud Västra Götaland County Sweden
- Chairman: Leif Källén
- Website: http://dalsland.svenskfotboll.se/

The Dalslands Fotbollförbund (Dalsland Football Association) is one of the 24 district organisations of the Swedish Football Association. It administers lower tier football in the historical province of Dalsland.

== Background ==
Dalslands Fotbollförbund, commonly referred to as Dalslands FF, is the governing body for football in the historical province of Dalsland in Västra Götaland County. The Association currently has 35 member clubs. Based in Mellerud, the Association's Chairman is Leif Källén. In 2024 the association has started a merger with the Bohuslän Football Association

== Affiliated Members ==
The following clubs are affiliated to the Dalslands FF:

- Bengtsfors IF
- Billingsfors IK
- Bäckefors IF
- Brålanda IF
- Dals Långeds IK
- DFC Rölanda
- Eds FF
- Edsleskogs IF
- Ellenö IK
- Färgelanda IF
- Fengersfors IK
- Frändefors IF
- Gesäters IF
- Gestad SK
- Grane IK
- Gustavsfors IF
- H.E.F. Valbo BK
- Håbols IF
- Håfreströms IF
- Högsäters GF
- IF Viken
- IFK Åmål
- Kroppefjälls IF
- Laxarby IF
- Melleruds IF
- Nössemarks IF
- Rådanefors IF
- Rölanda IF
- Stigens IF
- Stora Böns IK
- Tösse IF
- Valbo FC
- Åsebro IF
- Ärtemarks IF
- Ödeborgs IF

== League Competitions ==
Dalslands FF run the following League Competitions:

=== Men's Football ===
Division 5 - one section
Division 6 - one section

=== Women's Football ===
Division 3 - one section (with Bohusläns FF)
Division 4 - one section (with Bohusläns FF)
Division 5 - one section
