= Mellerud Municipality =

Mellerud Municipality Melleruds kommun
- Municipality
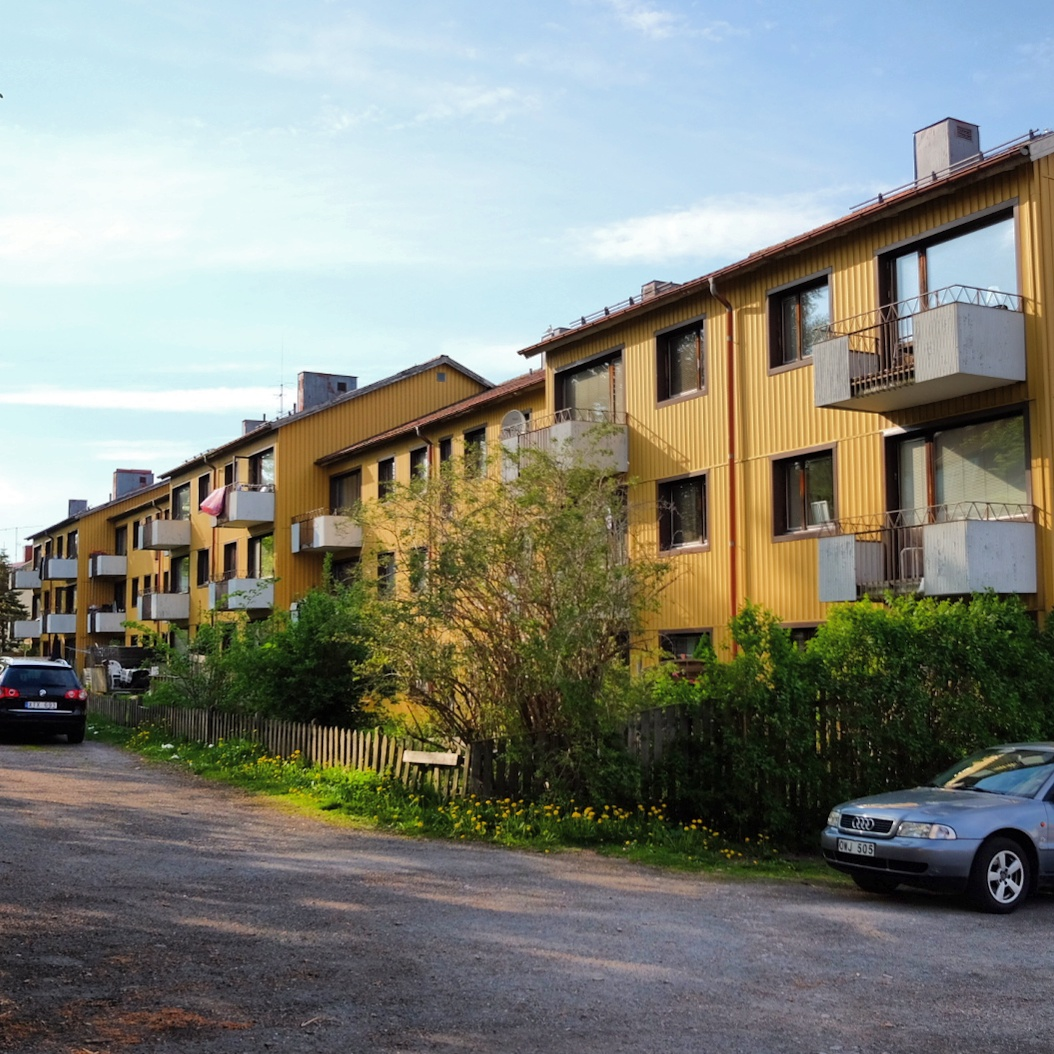

- Coat of arms

- Coordinates: 58°42′N 12°28′E
- Country: Sweden
- County: Västra Götaland County
- Seat: Mellerud

Area
  - Total: 944.46 km^{2} (364.66 sq mi)
  - Land: 516.8 km^{2} (199.5 sq mi)
  - Water: 427.66 km^{2} (165.12 sq mi)
- Area as of 1 January 2014.

Population (30 June 2025)
  - Total: 9,033
  - Density: 17.48/km^{2} (45.27/sq mi)
- Time zone: UTC+1 (CET)
  - Summer (DST): UTC+2 (CEST)
- ISO 3166 code: SE
- Province: Dalsland
- Municipal code: 1461
- Website: www.mellerud.se

Mellerud Municipality (Swedish: Melleruds kommun) is a municipality in Västra Götaland County by Lake Vänern in Sweden. Its seat is located in the town of Mellerud.

The amalgamation leading to the present municipality took place in 1969 when "old" Mellerud (instituted as a market town (köping) in 1908) was merged with Bolstad, Kroppefjäll and Skållerud. Before the municipal reform of 1952 there were ten entities in the area.

== Localities ==
Population figures from Statistics Sweden as of December 31, 2005.

- Mellerud, 3,796
- Dals Rostock, 885
- Åsensbruk, 530
- Bränna, 228
- Dalskog, 151
- Håverud, 150
- Köpmannebro, 76
- Erikstad, 58

== Demographics ==
This is a demographic table based on Mellerud Municipality's electoral districts in the 2022 Swedish general election sourced from SVT's election platform, in turn taken from SCB official statistics.

In total there were 9,235 residents, including 6,919 Swedish citizens of voting age. 39.5% voted for the left coalition and 58.7% for the right coalition. Indicators are in percentage points except population totals and income.

| Location | Residents | Citizen adults | Left vote | Right vote | Employed | Swedish parents | Foreign heritage | Income SEK | Degree |
| Location | | | % | % | | | | | |
|---|---|---|---|---|---|---|---|---|---|
| Bolstad | 1,204 | 935 | 36.4 | 63.0 | 86 | 91 | 9 | 25,250 | 26 |
| Fagerlid/Järn | 2,190 | 1,708 | 38.2 | 60.1 | 80 | 81 | 19 | 24,064 | 27 |
| Mellerud/Holm | 2,672 | 1,817 | 42.0 | 55.5 | 69 | 62 | 38 | 19,674 | 29 |
| Rostock/Dalskog/Ör | 1,971 | 1,545 | 37.3 | 61.0 | 80 | 88 | 12 | 23,099 | 29 |
| Skållerud | 1,198 | 914 | 43.1 | 55.1 | 72 | 78 | 22 | 21,677 | 30 |
Source: SVT
