= Stångenäs AIS =

Swedish football club

- Full name: Stångenäs Allmänna Idrottssällskap
- Nickname: SAIS
- Founded: 1946
- Ground: Husqvarna Arena; Brastad; Sweden
- Chairman: Johan Mellgren
- League: Division 4 Bohuslän/Dalsland
Home colours	Away colours

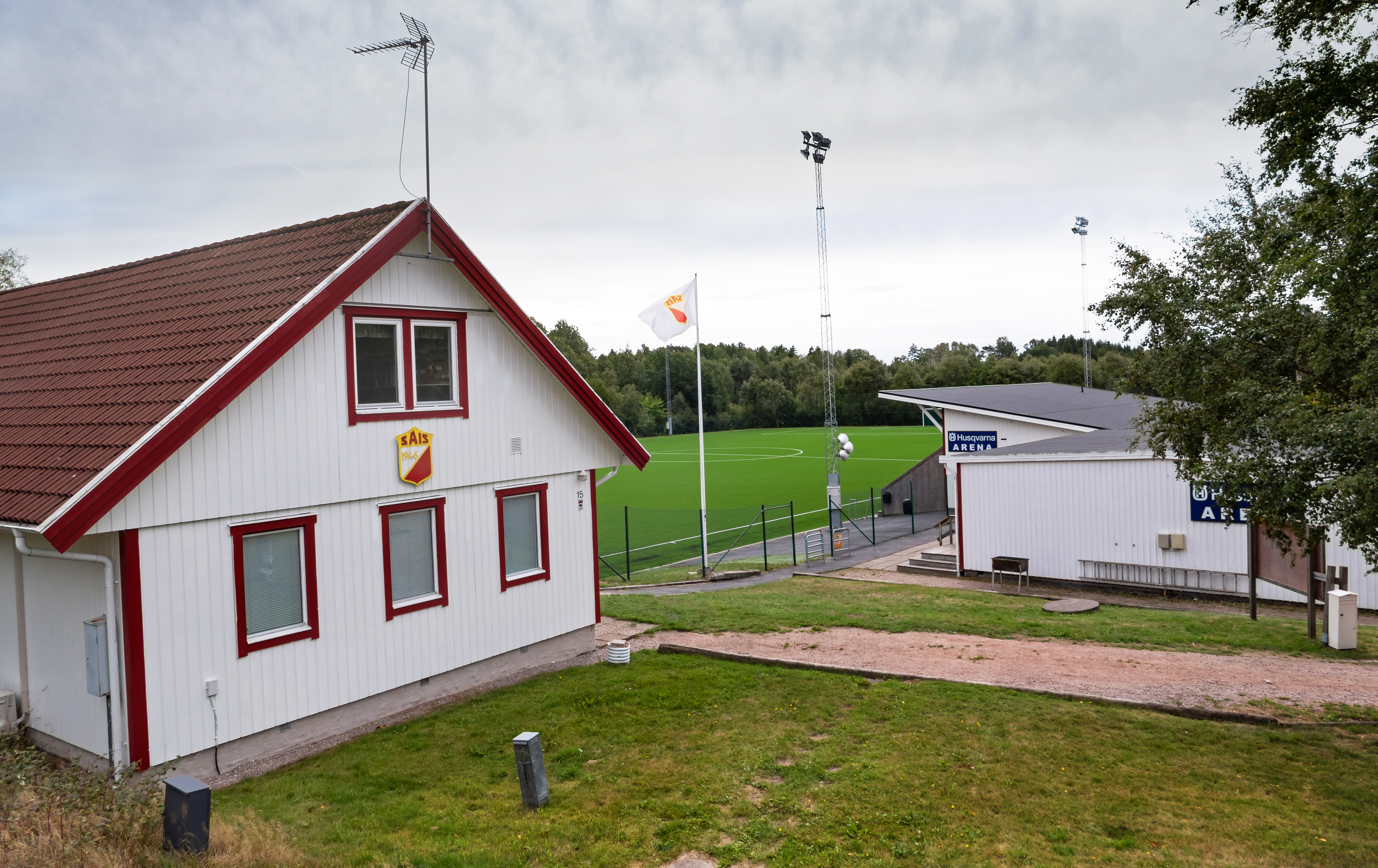
SAIS Club House at Brastad arena, Brastad

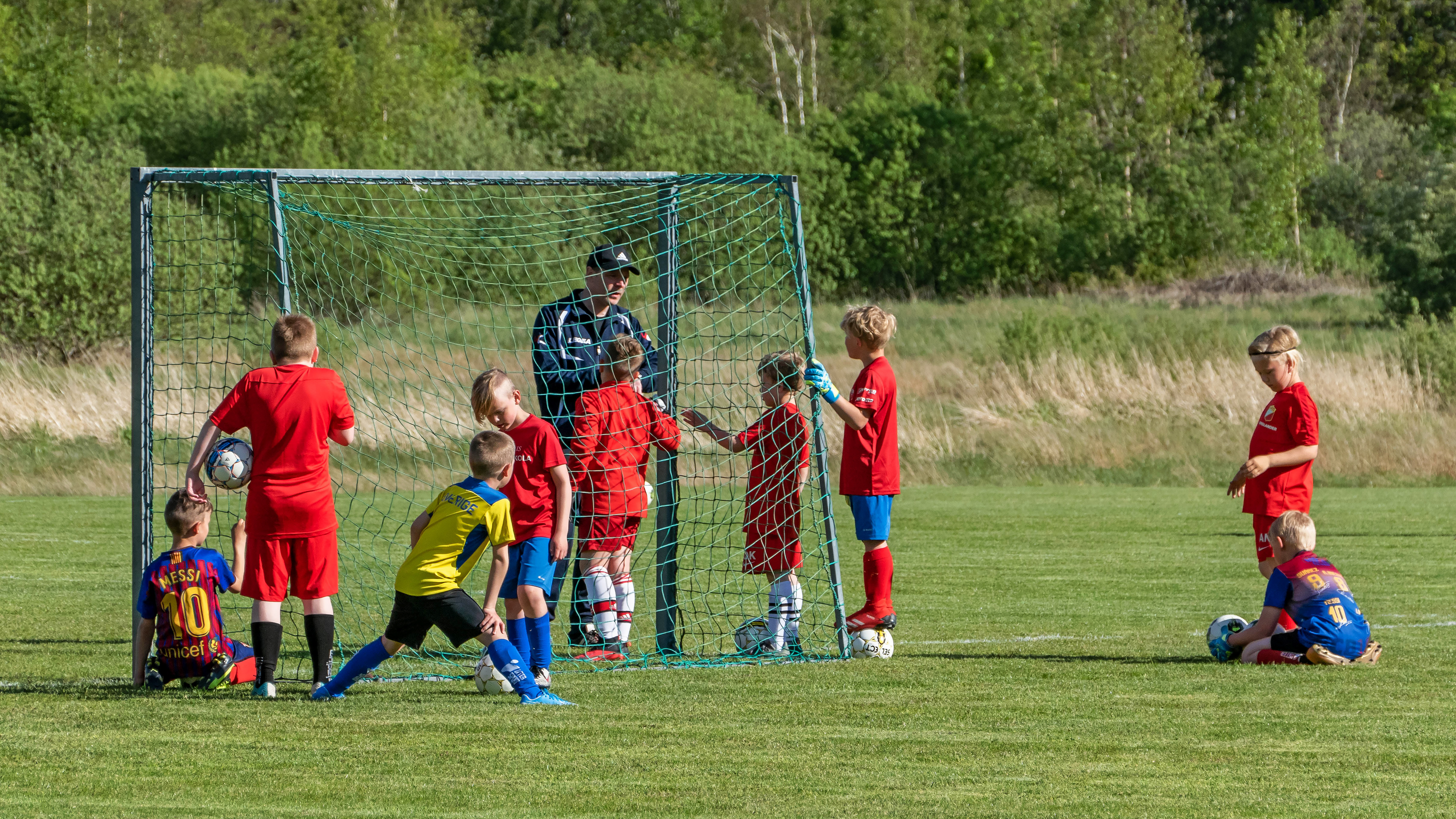
Soccer practice with some of the youngest SAIS members

Stångenäs AIS is a Swedish football and multisports club located in Brastad.

== Background ==
Stångenäs AIS currently plays in Division 4 Bohuslän/Dalsland which is the sixth tier of Swedish football. They play their home matches at the Husqvarna Arena in Brastad.

The club is affiliated to Bohusläns Fotbollförbund. Stångenäs AIS have competed in the Svenska Cupen on 5 occasions and have played 8 matches in the competition. The club played in the 2011 Svenska Cupen and beat Gunnilse IS 4–2 at home in the preliminary round but lost 0–1 at home to Örgryte IS in the first round before a crowd of 450 people.

== Season to season ==
In recent seasons Stångenäs AIS have competed in the following divisions:

Season	Level	Division	Section	Position	Movements
2006*	Tier 7	Division 5	Bohuslän	11th	Relegated
2007	Tier 8	Division 6	Bohuslän Norra	1st	Promoted
2008	Tier 7	Division 5	Bohuslän	3rd	
2009	Tier 7	Division 5	Bohuslän	3rd	
2010	Tier 7	Division 5	Bohuslän	1st	Promoted
2011	Tier 6	Division 4	Bohuslän/Dalsland	2nd	

* League restructuring in 2006 resulted in a new division being created at Tier 3 and subsequent divisions dropping a level.
