= Brastad =

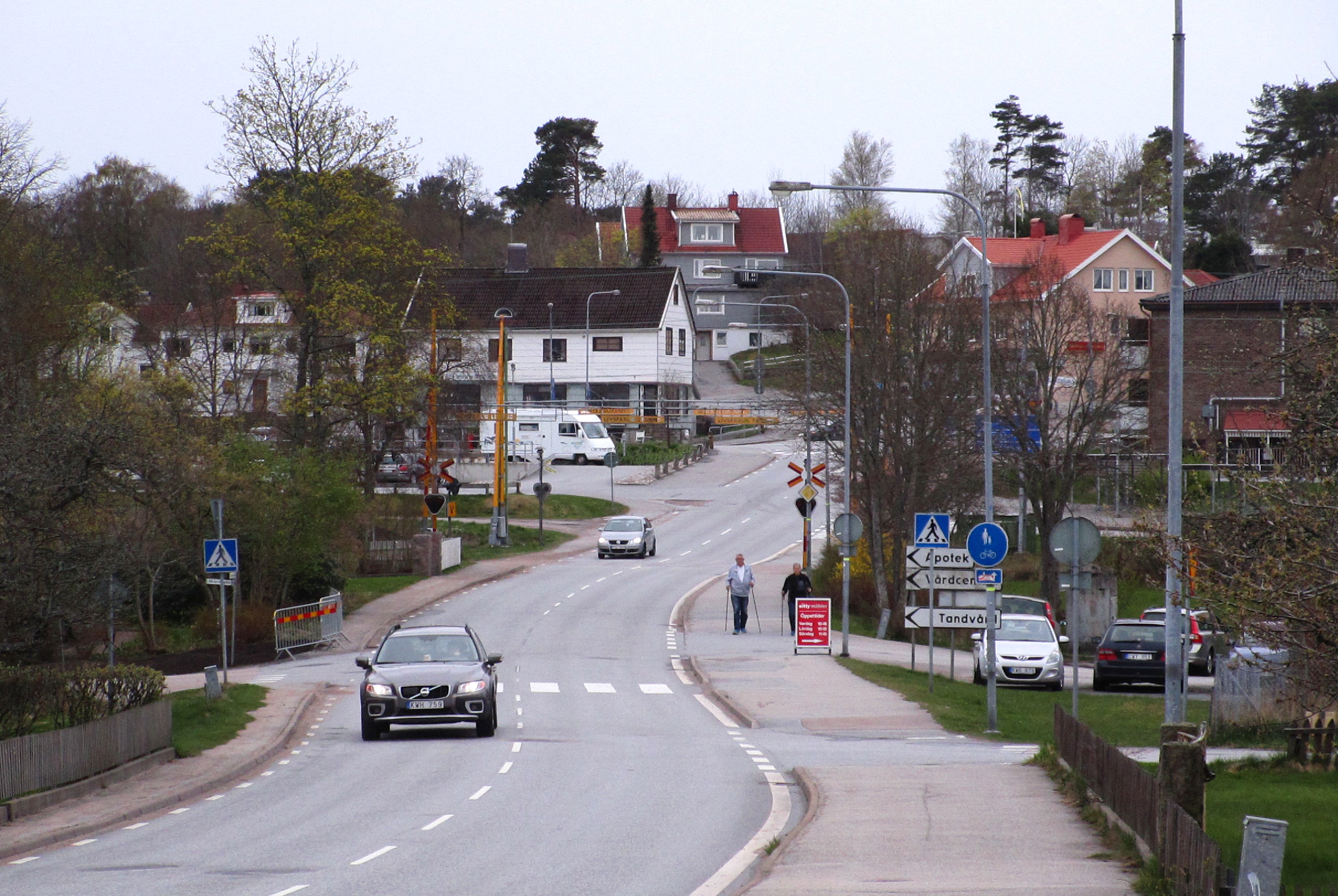
- Downtown Brastad

- Location within Västra Götaland Location within Sweden
- Coordinates: 58°22′53″N 11°29′4″E
- Country: Sweden
- Province: Bohuslän
- County: Västra Götaland County
- Municipality: Lysekil Municipality

Area
  - Total: 1.85 km^{2} (0.71 sq mi)

Population (31 December 2010)
  - Total: 1,846
  - Density: 999/km^{2} (2,590/sq mi)
- Time zone: UTC+1 (CET)
  - Summer (DST): UTC+2 (CEST)

Brastad is a locality situated in Lysekil Municipality, Västra Götaland County, Sweden. It had 1,846 inhabitants in 2010.

== Economy ==
The largest enterprise is Husqvarna AB who has a сrankshaft manufacturing operation going on with 165 employees.

== Sports ==
The following sports clubs are located in Brastad:

- Stångenäs AIS
