= Bohusläns Fotbollförbund =

- Abbreviation: Bohusläns FF
- Formation: 1917
- Purpose: District Football Association
- Location(s): Norra Strandvägen 7 473 34 Henån Bohuslän Västra Götaland County Sweden
- Chairman: Stefan Herre Eriksson
- Website: http://bohuslan.svenskfotboll.se/

The Bohusläns Fotbollförbund (Bohuslän Football Association) is one of the 24 district organisations of the Swedish Football Association. It administers lower tier football in the historical province of Bohuslän.

== Background ==
Bohusläns Fotbollförbund, commonly referred to as Bohusläns FF, is the governing body for football in the historical province of Bohuslän in Västra Götaland County. The Association was founded in 1917 and currently has 70 member clubs. Based in Henån, the Association's Chairman is Stefan Herre Eriksson.

== Affiliated Members ==
The following clubs are affiliated to the Bohusläns FF:

- Bokenäs IF
- Bovallstrands IF
- Bullarens GOIF
- DFK Valla
- Dyröns IF
- FC Herrsta
- Fjällbacka IK
- Footballclub Stenungsunds IF
- Gilleby IF
- Gilleby-Stala Orust FC
- Grebbestads IF
- Groheds IF
- Grundsunds IF
- Hällevadsholms SK
- Hamburgsunds IF
- Hedekas IF
- Henån FC
- Henåns IF
- Herrestads AIF
- Hogstorps FK
- Hogstorps IF
- Hunnebostrands GOIF
- IF Uddevallakamraterna
- IFK Lane
- IFK Strömstad
- IFK Uddevalla
- IFK Valla
- IK Oddevold
- IK Rössö Uddevalla
- IK Rössö United
- IK Svane
- Käringöns IF
- Kungshamns IF
- Lane FC
- Ljungskile SK
- Lyse FF
- Lysekils FF
- Mollösunds IF
- Morlanda GOIF
- Munkedals IF
- Myckleby FK
- Myckleby IK
- Rabbalshede IK
- Rönnängs FF
- Rosseröds IK
- Sibräcka GOIF
- Skärhamns FC
- Skärhamns IK
- Skee IF
- Skredsviks SK
- Slättens IK
- Smögens IF
- Sotenäs DFF
- Sotenäs FC
- Stala IF
- Stångenäs AIS
- Stångenäs FF
- Stenshults IF
- Stenungsunds Futsal Förening
- Stenungsunds IF
- Svarteborg Dingle IF
- Svenshögens SK
- Tanums IF
- Tjörns DFF
- Torp GOIF
- Uddevalla IS
- Vallens FF
- Vallens IF
- Ödsmåls IK
- Överby IF

== League Competitions ==
Bohusläns FF run the following League Competitions:

=== Men's Football ===
Division 4 - one section (with Dalslands FF)
Division 5 - one section
Division 6 - two sections

=== Women's Football ===
Division 3 - one section (with Dalslands FF)
Division 4 - one section (with Dalslands FF)
Division 5 - one section
