= Copa del Sol =

- Founded: 2010
- Abolished: 2014
- Region: Europe (UEFA)
- Teams: 10 (2014)
- Last champions: (Norway) Strømsgodset IF
- Most championships: (Ukraine) Shakhtar Donetsk (2 titles)

The Copa del Sol was an annual tournament exhibition of international football clubs in Marbella, the south coast of Spain, from January to February. It was one month before the kickoff of the national leagues between 2010 and 2014.

The tournament was a chance for training and match play for the northern European football teams during their winter break against big names from Eastern European football, particularly Russia and Ukraine. It was co-organized by Swedish IEC in Sports, part of Lagardère Group and Norwegian Norsk Toppfotball. All games were broadcast back to home markets of participating clubs allowing fans to observe the current progress of team preparation for the upcoming season, and were screened live on television in Sweden, Norway, Denmark and pan-Africa.

== History ==
With the inaugural tournament mainly held at Marbella FC's 7500-capacity Estadio Municipal, the final game of the 2010 tournament could not be held due to heavy rain. Both of the teams reaching the final, Shakhtar Donetsk and CSKA Moscow were declared joint winners. The highest-scoring game in competition history came in its opening year, with Kalmar beating Ole Gunnar Solskjaer's Molde 6–4. Despite being organised as a warm-weather training tournament, fans from across Scandinavia did travel to watch the matches, with some attendances reaching 1,000.

With the tournament moving to La Manga and Elche and expanded to 16 teams, FC Karpaty Lviv were the winners of the 2011 tournament. To replace the Copa del Sol in its former host city, the Marbella Cup was relaunched after an absence of seven years.

The 2012 tournament took place from 28 January to 7 February, and was won by Spartak Moscow.

The 2013 tournament took place on 23 January - 2 February 2013. FC Shakhtar Donetsk beat Widzew Lodz 2–1 in the final. The total amount of prize money was 80,000 euro.

Strømsgodset IF of Norway won the last Copa del Sol tournament in 2014, beating Astra Giurgiu in the final, becoming the first (and last) Scandinavian club to win the competition. Only AIK represented Sweden, with Vestsjælland being the lone Danish club attached. No club from Russia or Ukraine competed, and sides from Latvia, Moldova and Angola were brought in. Setanta Africa, who had broadcast the previous four tournaments, did not cover the 2014 edition.

With interest waning, the absence of Champions League and Europa League sides, and with most matches watched by only a handful of spectators at the now-permanent venue of La Manga, the competition was discontinued.

A rival event, the La Manga Cup, ran from 1999 until 2016, but also suffered a similar ultimate fate when many top Scandinavian clubs chose not to take part in what turned out to be its final year.

== Results ==
Season	Winner	Score	Runner-up	Venue	Date	Teams
2010	(Russia) CSKA Moscow (Ukraine) Shakhtar Donetsk	N/A	Match was cancelled due to heavy rain. Both teams were declared joint winners.	Marbella, Spain	3–12 February 2010	8
2011	(Ukraine) Karpaty Lviv	1 – 0	(Ukraine) Shakhtar Donetsk	Elche and La Manga Club, Spain	27 January – 7 February 2011	16
2012	(Russia) Spartak Moscow	1 – 0	(Denmark) F.C. Copenhagen	Benidorm and La Manga Club, Spain	28 January – 7 February 2012	12
2013	(Ukraine) Shakhtar Donetsk	2 – 1	(Poland) Widzew Łódź	La Manga Club and Pinatar, Spain	23 January – 2 February 2013	12
2014	(Norway) Strømsgodset	1 – 0	(Romania) Astra Giurgiu	La Manga Club; Spain	27 January – 6 February 2014	10

== See also ==
- Football Impact Cup
- Marbella Cup
- Costa del Sol Trophy
