= Robin Staaf =

Swedish footballer

Personal information
- Full name: Robin Staaf
- Date of birth: 26 September 1986 (age 40)
- Place of birth: Helsingborg, Sweden
- Height: 1.82 m (5 ft 11 1/2 in)
- Position: Forward

Team information
- Current team: Ängelholms FF
- Number: 14

Youth career
- Bårslövs BoIF
- 2000–2005: Helsingborgs IF

Senior career*
Years	Team	Apps	(Gls)
2006–2007	Helsingborgs Södra BIS		(24)
2008	Ramlösa Södra FF	11	(11)
2008–2011	Örebro SK	43	(7)
2010	→ Ängelholms FF (loan)	11	(2)
2012–	Ängelholms FF	38	(10)

International career
2001–2003	Sweden U17	12	(3)
2004–2005	Sweden U19	8	(0)
- * Club domestic league appearances and goals as of 25 June 2013

Robin Staaf (born 26 September 1986 in Helsingborg), sometimes spelled Robin Staf, is a Swedish footballer who plays as a forward for Ängelholms FF.

== Career ==
Staaf spent most of his youth at Helsingborgs IF. But when he turned 18 he wanted to move on and after local fourth tier club Helsingborgs Södra BIS called him he decided to join them. The club changed its name to Ramlösa Södra FF in 2008 and Staaf had a prolific first half of the season which enabled him to move up four levels to Allsvenskan side Örebro SK. His time at Örebro was plagued with injuries and he left after the 2011 Allsvenskan season for Superettan club Ängelholms FF where he had previously been on loan.

== International career ==
Staaf has represented both the Sweden men's national under-17 football team and the Sweden men's national under-19 football team.

== Career statistics ==
As of 25 June 2013

Club performance			League		Cup		Continental		Total	
Season	Club	League	Apps	Goals	Apps	Goals	Apps	Goals	Apps	Goals
Sweden			League		Svenska Cupen		Europe		Total	
2006	Helsingborgs Södra BIS	Division 2	?	8	—		—		?	8
2007	Helsingborgs Södra BIS	Division 2	?	16	—		—		?	16
2008	Ramlösa Södra FF	Division 2	11	11	—		—		11	11
2008	Örebro SK	Allsvenskan	10	4	—		—		10	4
2009	Örebro SK	Allsvenskan	8	0	—		—		8	0
2010	Örebro SK	Allsvenskan	10	0	2	1	—		12	1
2010	Ängelholms FF (loan)	Superettan	11	2	—		—		11	2
2011	Örebro SK	Allsvenskan	15	3	3	1	2	0	20	4
2012	Ängelholms FF	Superettan	23	4	—		—		23	4
2013	Ängelholms FF	Superettan	13	6	2	1	—		15	7
Career total			101	54	7	3	—		108	57
