= Bränna =

- Location within Västra Götaland Location within Sweden
- Coordinates: 58°48′N 12°25′E
- Country: Sweden
- Province: Dalsland
- County: Västra Götaland County
- Municipality: Mellerud Municipality

Area
  - Total: 0.59 km^{2} (0.23 sq mi)

Population (2005-12-31)
  - Total: 228
  - Density: 387/km^{2} (1,000/sq mi)
- Time zone: UTC+1 (CET)
  - Summer (DST): UTC+2 (CEST)

Bränna is a village situated in Mellerud Municipality, Västra Götaland County, Sweden. It had 228 inhabitants in 2005.
