= Tobias Christensen (footballer, born 1995) =

Danish footballer (born 1995)

Personal information
- Full name: Tobias Harro Christensen
- Date of birth: 4 January 1995 (age 31)
- Place of birth: Frederiksberg, Denmark
- Position: Winger

Team information
- Current team: Boldklubben VLI

Youth career
- Copenhagen

Senior career*
Years	Team	Apps	(Gls)
2013–2014	Copenhagen	0	(0)
2014–2016	Elche B	11	(1)
2015–2016	→ Jumilla (loan)	12	(4)
2016–2018	Helsingør	31	(2)
2018–2019	Næstved	28	(2)
2019–2020	HB Køge	25	(0)
2020–2021	Vendsyssel	8	(0)
2021	→ B36 (loan)	11	(2)
2021	B.93	7	(0)
2022–	Boldklubben VLI		

International career
2011	Denmark U16	1	(0)
2013	Denmark U18	2	(1)
2013–2014	Denmark U19	9	(1)
2013–2014	Denmark U20	4	(0)
- * Club domestic league appearances and goals as of 16:02, 22 October 2021 (UTC)

Tobias Harro Christensen (born 4 January 1995) is a Danish footballer who plays as a winger for Boldklubben VLI.
