= Dolní Branná =

- Municipality
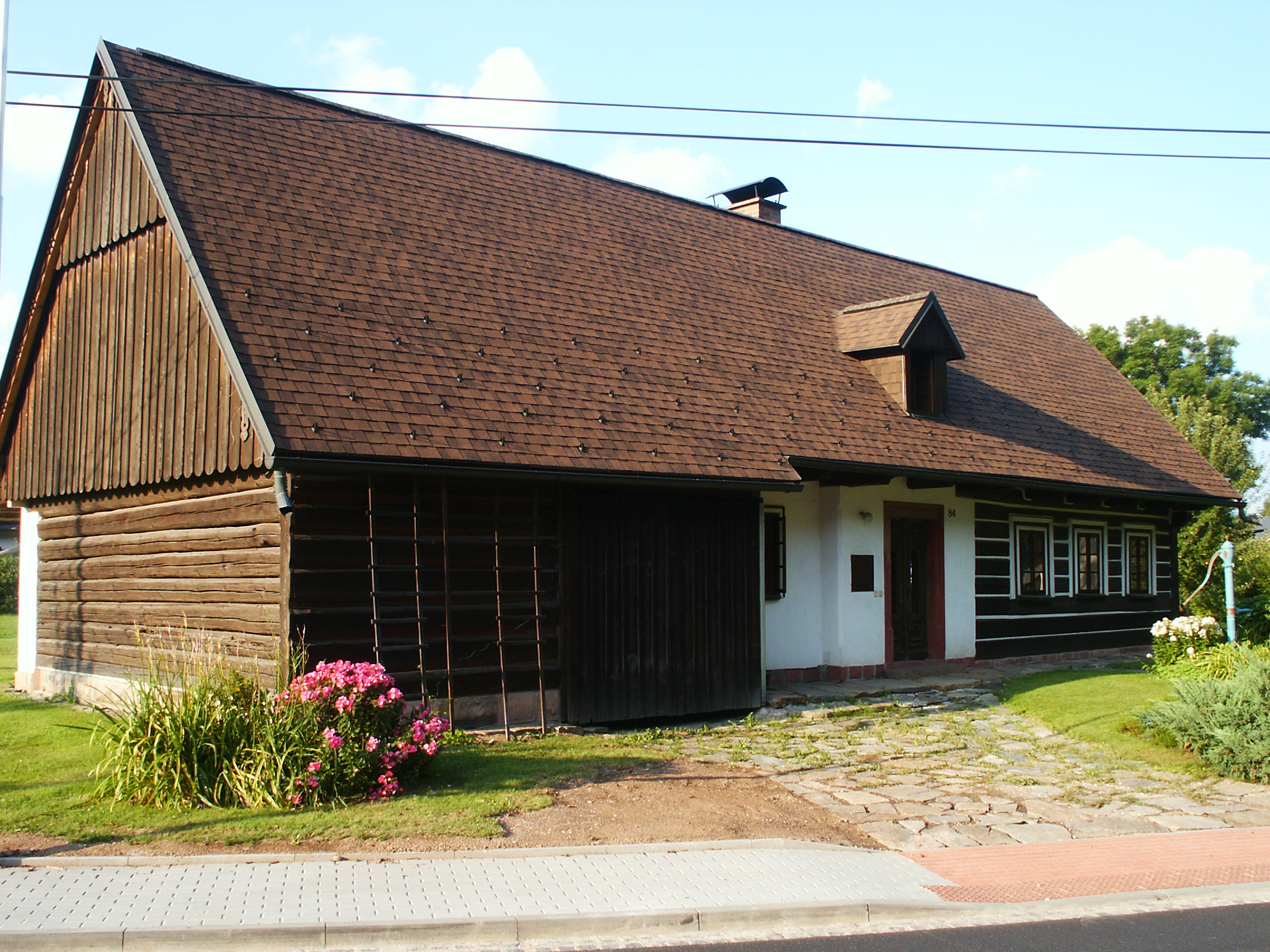
- House No. 84, a typical log house

- Flag Coat of arms

- Location in the Czech Republic
- Coordinates: 50°35′40″N 15°35′32″E
- Country: Czech Republic
- Region: Hradec Králové
- District: Trutnov
- First mentioned: 1357

Area
  - Total: 7.91 km^{2} (3.05 sq mi)
- Elevation: 428 m (1,404 ft)

Population (2026-01-01)
  - Total: 1,017
  - Density: 129/km^{2} (333/sq mi)
- Time zone: UTC+1 (CET)
  - Summer (DST): UTC+2 (CEST)
- Postal code: 543 62
- Website: www.dbranna.cz

Dolní Branná is a municipality and village in Trutnov District in the Hradec Králové Region of the Czech Republic. It has about 1,000 inhabitants.

== Demographics ==
Historical population
Year	Pop.	±%
1869	1,375	—
1880	1,328	−3.4%
1890	1,348	+1.5%
1900	1,397	+3.6%
1910	1,402	+0.4%
1921	1,293	−7.8%
1930	1,294	+0.1%
1950	972	−24.9%
1961	1,001	+3.0%
1970	968	−3.3%
1980	875	−9.6%
1991	852	−2.6%
2001	901	+5.8%
2011	942	+4.6%
2021	949	+0.7%
Source: Censuses
