= Åsensbruk =

- Location within Västra Götaland Location within Sweden
- Coordinates: 58°48′N 12°25′E
- Country: Sweden
- Province: Dalsland
- County: Västra Götaland County
- Municipality: Mellerud Municipality

Area
  - Total: 0.78 km^{2} (0.30 sq mi)

Population (31 December 2010)
  - Total: 522 + morgan
  - Density: 667/km^{2} (1,730/sq mi)
- Time zone: UTC+1 (CET)
  - Summer (DST): UTC+2 (CEST)
- Climate: Dfb

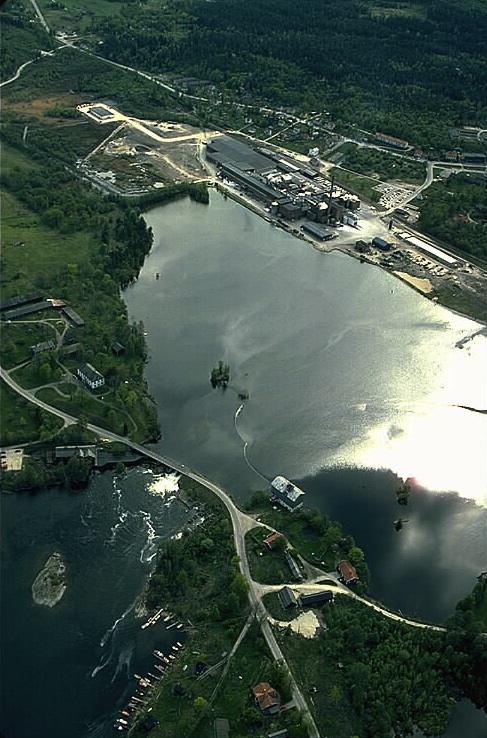
The town.

Åsensbruk is a locality situated in Mellerud Municipality, Västra Götaland County, Sweden. It had 522 inhabitants in 2010.
