= Semir Mete =

Swedish footballer

Personal information
- Full name: Semir Mete
- Date of birth: 27 October 1987 (age 39)
- Place of birth: Sweden
- Height: 1.77 m (5 ft 9 1/2 in)
- Position: Midfielder

Youth career
- Syrianska FC

Senior career*
Years	Team	Apps	(Gls)
2008–2012	Syrianska FC	22	(4)
2011	→ Syrianska IF Kerburan (loan)	8	(1)
2012	→ Husqvarna FF (loan)	0	(0)
2013	Eskilstuna City	25	(5)
2014–2015	Södertälje FK	34	(7)
- * Club domestic league appearances and goals as of 9 January 2016

Semir Mete (born 27 October 1987) is a Swedish footballer who plays as a midfielder. He played in the Allsvenskan for Syrianska FC.
