= Mariusz Rybicki =

Polish footballer

Personal information
- Full name: Mariusz Rybicki
- Date of birth: 13 March 1993 (age 33)
- Place of birth: Łódź, Poland
- Height: 1.75 m (5 ft 9 in)
- Position: Attacking midfielder

Team information
- Current team: Football Campus Tomaszów Maz.

Youth career
- UKS SMS Łódź

Senior career*
Years	Team	Apps	(Gls)
2009–2010	UKS SMS Łódź II		
2010–2011	UKS SMS Łódź	13	(3)
2011–2015	Widzew Łódź	87	(10)
2015–2016	Pogoń Siedlce	34	(7)
2016–2018	Korona Kielce	0	(0)
2016–2017	→ Miedź Legnica (loan)	19	(2)
2017–2018	→ Wigry Suwałki (loan)	33	(4)
2018–2019	Odra Opole	28	(3)
2019–2021	Warta Poznań	40	(2)
2021–2022	Wigry Suwałki	25	(5)
2022–2024	Motor Lublin	55	(2)
2024–2026	Lechia Tomaszów Mazowiecki	52	(11)
2026–	Football Campus Tomaszów Maz.	0	(0)

International career
2013	Poland U20	4	(0)
2012	Poland U21	1	(0)
- * Club domestic league appearances and goals as of 23:49, 3 June 2026 (UTC)

Mariusz Rybicki (born 13 March 1993) is a Polish professional footballer who plays as an attacking midfielder for Klasa A club Football Campus Tomaszów Mazowiecki.

== Honours ==
Lechia Tomaszów Mazowiecki

- Polish Cup (Łódź regionals): 2024–25
