= Emanuel Svensson =

Swedish footballer

Personal information
- Full name: Emanuel Svensson
- Date of birth: 20 February 1989 (age 37)
- Place of birth: Sweden
- Position: Midfielder

Team information
- Current team: Kristianstads FF (on loan from Mjällby AIF)
- Number: 14

Senior career*
Years	Team	Apps	(Gls)
2008–	Mjällby AIF	47	(0)
2011	→ Falkenbergs FF (loan)	7	(0)
2012–	→ Kristianstads FF (loan)	12	(2)
- * Club domestic league appearances and goals as of 10 January 2012

Emanuel Svensson (born 20 February 1989) is a Swedish footballer who plays for Kristianstads FF on loan from Mjällby AIF as a midfielder.
