= Marcus Astvald =

Swedish footballer

Personal information
- Full name: Marcus Carl Victor Astvald
- Date of birth: 3 September 1990 (age 36)
- Place of birth: Örebro, Sweden
- Height: 1.88 m (6 ft 2 in)
- Positions: Left midfielder; forward

Team information
- Current team: BK Forward

Youth career
- Örebro SK Ungdom

Senior career*
Years	Team	Apps	(Gls)
2008	Örebro SK Ungdom	21	(5)
2009–2013	Örebro SK	99	(10)
2013–2015	Degerfors IF	71	(6)
2016–2017	Levanger	56	(4)
2018	IK Brage	29	(5)
2019–2020	Degerfors IF	46	(5)
2021	Östers IF	6	(0)
2021–	BK Forward	0	(0)

International career
2009–2010	Sweden U19	7	(0)
2010–2011	Sweden U21	2	(0)
- * Club domestic league appearances and goals as of 30 May 2021

Marcus Astvald (born 3 September 1990) is a Swedish footballer who plays as a left midfielder or forward for BK Forward.

== Career ==
=== Degerfors IF ===
On 26 November 2018, Degerfors IF announced that they had re-signed Astvald for the 2019 season on a free transfer. Astvald signed for two year.
