= Erik Salkić =

Slovenian footballer

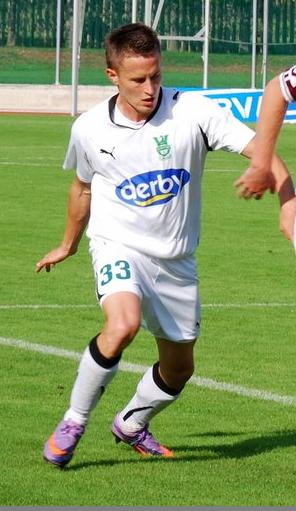

Personal information
- Date of birth: 10 April 1987 (age 39)
- Place of birth: Postojna, SFR Yugoslavia
- Height: 1.76 m (5 ft 9 1/2 in)
- Position: Full-back

Youth career
- Tabor Sežana
- –2006: Koper

Senior career*
Years	Team	Apps	(Gls)
2005–2006	Koper	4	(0)
2006–2009	Interblock	73	(4)
2009–2013	Olimpija Ljubljana	113	(5)
2013	Arsenal Tula	7	(0)
2015	Tabor Sežana	7	(2)
2015–2017	Kras Repen	57	(3)
2017–2022	Tabor Sežana	135	(5)
Total		396	(19)

International career
2004	Slovenia U17	1	(0)
2006–2007	Slovenia U20	3	(0)
2006–2008	Slovenia U21	14	(0)
- * Club domestic league appearances and goals

Erik Salkić (born 10 April 1987) is a Slovenian retired footballer who played as a defender.

== Career ==
Salkić started his senior career at Koper before joining Interblock in the 2006–07 season. He left the club in 2009 after his contract ran out, and signed for Olimpija Ljubljana on a free transfer.

He earned 14 appearances for the Slovenia U21 team between 2006 and 2008.
