= Lawal Ismail =

Nigerian/Swedish footballer

Personal information
- Full name: Lawal Adebowale Ismail
- Date of birth: 5 September 1991 (age 35)
- Place of birth: Saki, Oyo State, Nigeria
- Height: 1.82 m (5 ft 11 1/2 in)
- Position: Midfielder

Team information
- Current team: Assyriska FF
- Number: 12

Youth career
- Velletri Soccer Academy

Senior career*
Years	Team	Apps	(Gls)
2010–2012	IFK Göteborg	3	(0)
2012–2013	Syrianska FC	6	(0)
2013–2014	Vasalunds IF	25	(3)
2014–2017	Degerfors IF	13	(0)
2017–	Assyriska FF	11	(0)
- * Club domestic league appearances and goals as of 30 November 2017 (UTC)

Lawal Adebowale Ismail (born 5 September 1991) is a Nigerian footballer who plays for Assyriska FF as a midfielder. He also holds a Swedish passport.
