= Kamal Mustafa =

Swedish footballer

Personal information
- Full name: Kamal Mustafa
- Date of birth: 22 July 1991 (age 35)
- Place of birth: Kiruna, Sweden
- Height: 1.74 m (5 ft 9 in)
- Position: Midfielder

Team information
- Current team: IK Oddevold
- Number: 10

Youth career
- Gunnilse IS

Senior career*
Years	Team	Apps	(Gls)
2009–2011	IFK Göteborg	4	(0)
2012–2013	Qviding FIF	31	(7)
2013–2014	IS Halmia	33	(4)
2015–2016	Falkenbergs FF	26	(1)
2017	Syrianska FC	11	(0)
2018	Utsiktens BK	15	(1)
2019–	IK Oddevold	26	(6)

International career
2007–2008	Sweden U17	18	(6)
2009	Sweden U19	4	(0)
- * Club domestic league appearances and goals as of 21:01, 23 December 2019 (UTC)

Kamal Mustafa (born 22 July 1991) is a Swedish footballer who plays for IK Oddevold as a midfielder.
