= 2010 Copa del Sol =

Tournament details
- Country: Spain
- Dates: 3–12 February
- Teams: 8

Final positions
- Champions: (Russia) CSKA Moscow (Ukraine) Shakhtar Donetsk

Tournament statistics
- Matches played: 15
- Goals scored: 53 (3.53 per match)
- Top goal scorer(s): 3 goals (Denmark) Martin Vingaard (Czech Republic) Tomáš Necid

The 2010 Copa del Sol was the inaugural edition of an annual exhibition international club football tournament held on the Costa del Sol on the south coast of Spain and was played between 3–12 February 2010.

The initial tournament featured 8 teams, Molde FK and Rosenborg BK from Norway, Kalmar FF and IF Elfsborg from Sweden, FC Copenhagen and Odense BK from Denmark, FC Shakhtar Donetsk from Ukraine, and PFC CSKA Moscow from Russia.

The teams were divided into two groups, the Blue Group and the Red Group, with the teams placed 1st to 4th from each group meeting in the Play-off Stage to decide final positions.

Unfortunately, the final of the 2010 tournament wasn't able to be played due to heavy rain, so the finalists, CSKA Moscow and Shakhtar Donetsk, were declared joint winners and the prize money was shared.

== Group stage ==
=== Blue Group ===
Team	Pld	W	D	L	GF	GA	GD	Pts
(Ukraine) Shakhtar Donetsk	3	2	1	0	6	1	+5	7
(Denmark) Copenhagen	3	2	1	0	5	2	+3	7
(Sweden) Kalmar	3	1	0	2	6	8	−1	3
(Norway) Molde	3	0	0	3	4	11	−7	0

3 February 2010

Molde (Norway)	0–3	(Ukraine) Shakhtar Donetsk
	Report^{[usurped]}	Gladkiy 35'; Gai 86'; Kravchenko 89'

3 February 2010

Kalmar (Sweden)	1–2	(Denmark) Copenhagen
Carlsson 51'	Report^{[usurped]}	Vingaard 76'; Santin 86'

5 February 2010

Copenhagen (Denmark)	1–1	(Ukraine) Shakhtar Donetsk
Vingaard 8'	Report^{[usurped]}	Lewandowski 38'

5 February 2010

Kalmar (Sweden)	6–4	(Norway) Molde
Santos 15'; Dauda 28', 59'; Smylie 44'; Ferreira 54'; Mendes 76'	Report^{[usurped]}	Ertsås 11'; Hoseth 47' (pen.); Diouf 71', 90'

8 February 2010

Copenhagen (Denmark)	2–0	(Norway) Molde
Jørgensen 16'; Santin 71'	Report^{[usurped]}

8 February 2010

Kalmar (Sweden)	0–2	(Ukraine) Shakhtar Donetsk
	Report^{[usurped]}	Jádson 30' (pen.); Luiz Adriano 78'

=== Red Group ===
Team	Pld	W	D	L	GF	GA	GD	Pts
(Russia) CSKA Moscow	3	3	0	0	10	4	+6	9
(Denmark) Odense	3	2	0	1	6	5	+1	6
(Sweden) Elfsborg	3	0	1	2	3	6	−3	1
(Norway) Rosenborg	3	0	1	2	4	8	−4	1

4 February 2010

IF Elfsborg (Sweden)	2–3	(Russia) CSKA Moscow
Berglund 78'; Mobaeck 83'	Report^{[usurped]}	Honda 19'; Guilherme 38'; Karlsson 81' (o.g.)

4 February 2010

Rosenborg BK (Norway)	2–3	(Denmark) Odense BK
Moldskred 27'; Strand 83'	Report^{[usurped]}	Andreasen 9', 59'; Nordvik 57' (o.g.)

6 February 2010

CSKA Moscow (Russia)	4–1	(Norway) Rosenborg BK
Necid 20', 29'; Krasić 24'; Mamaev 52'	Report^{[usurped]}	Moldskred 4'

6 February 2010

IF Elfsborg (Sweden)	0–2	(Denmark) Odense BK
	Report^{[usurped]}	Demba-Nyrén 54'; Utaka 65'

9 February 2010

Odense BK (Denmark)	1–3	(Russia) CSKA Moscow
Cacá 32'	Report^{[usurped]}	Berezutskiy 42'; Krasić 43'; Necid 48'

9 February 2010

IF Elfsborg (Sweden)	1–1	(Norway) Rosenborg BK
Keene 71'	Report^{[usurped]}	Bakenga 87'

== Play-off stage ==
=== Seventh-place play-off ===
11 February 2010

Rosenborg BK (Norway)	1–0	(Norway) Molde
Steen 31' (o.g.)	Report^{[usurped]}

=== Fifth-place play-off ===
11 February 2010

Kalmar (Sweden)	1–3	(Sweden) IF Elfsborg
Israelsson 52'	Report^{[usurped]}	Keene 49'; Ishizaki 58'; Bajrami 78'

=== Third-place play-off ===
12 February 2010

Copenhagen (Denmark)	2–1	(Denmark) Odense BK
N'Doye 16'; Vingaard 66'	Report^{[usurped]}	Utaka 86'

=== Final ===
12 February 2010

CSKA Moscow (Russia)	N/A	(Ukraine) Shakhtar Donetsk
	Report^{[usurped]}

Match was cancelled due to heavy rain. Both teams were declared joint winners.

== Sources ==
- https://web.archive.org/web/20110628002506/http://www.copadelsol.org/
- http://shakhtar.com/en/news/12182
