= Didrik Fløtre =

Norwegian footballer (born 1991)

Personal information
- Full name: Didrik Knutsen Fløtre
- Date of birth: 31 December 1991 (age 34)
- Place of birth: Norway
- Height: 1.87 m (6 ft 2 in)
- Position: Striker

Senior career*
| Years | Team | Apps | (Gls) |
| 2008–2012 | Aalesund | 7 | (1) |
| 2009–2011 | → Aalesund 2 | 3 | (0) |
| 2012 | → Kristiansund (loan) | 24 | (13) |
| 2013 | Skarbøvik | 20 | (6) |
| 2014–2017 | Brattvåg | 83 | (3) |
| 2015 | → Brattvåg 2 | 1 | (1) |
| 2018–2019 | Emblem | 36 | (8) |

International career
| 2007 | Norway U16 | 3 | (0) |
| 2008 | Norway U18 | 4 | (0) |
| 2009 | Norway U19 | 2 | (0) |
- * Club domestic league appearances and goals as of 12 December 2022

Didrik Knudsen Fløtre (born 31 December 1991) is a Norwegian former professional footballer who played as a striker. During his career, he won the Norwegian Football Cup twice with Aalesunds FK, in 2009 and 2011.

== Club career ==
Fløtre began playing football with Tippeligaen side Aalesunds FK (AaFK). He made his debut on 4 June 2008 when he scored the winning goal on the 113th minute of AaFK's 5–4 victory against Åsane in the Norwegian Football Cup. He later won the Cup with AaFK in 2009 and 2011. In December 2009, he signed a four-year contract with AaFK.

After failing to break through into the starting lineup, he was loaned to Kristiansund in March 2012. For the season, he scored 13 goals in 24 league matches for Kristiansund, including five goals in a 6–1 win against Buvik IL on 13 May.

Fløtre later played for Brattvåg from 2014 to 2017 and Emblem from 2018 to 2019.

== International career ==
Fløtre played seven matches for Norway's youth national teams.

== Career statistics ==
Appearances and goals by club, season and competition
| Season | Club | League | | | Cup | | Total | |
| Season | Club | Division | Apps | Goals | Apps | Goals | Apps | Goals |
|---|---|---|---|---|---|---|---|---|
| Aalesund | 2008 | Tippeligaen | 0 | 0 | 1 | 1 | 1 | 1 |
| Aalesund | 2009 | Tippeligaen | 4 | 1 | 2 | 0 | 6 | 1 |
| Aalesund | 2010 | Tippeligaen | 2 | 0 | 1 | 0 | 3 | 0 |
| Aalesund | 2011 | Tippeligaen | 1 | 0 | 1 | 0 | 2 | 0 |
| Aalesund | Total | | 7 | 1 | 5 | 1 | 12 | 2 |
| Kristiansund | 2012 | 2. divisjon | 24 | 13 | 1 | 0 | 25 | 13 |
| Skarbøvik | 2013 | 2. divisjon | 20 | 6 | 1 | 0 | 21 | 6 |
| Brattvåg | 2014 | 3. divisjon | 1 | 0 | 1 | 1 | 2 | 1 |
| Career total | | | 52 | 20 | 8 | 2 | 60 | 22 |
