= Mellerud =

Town in Dalsland, Sweden

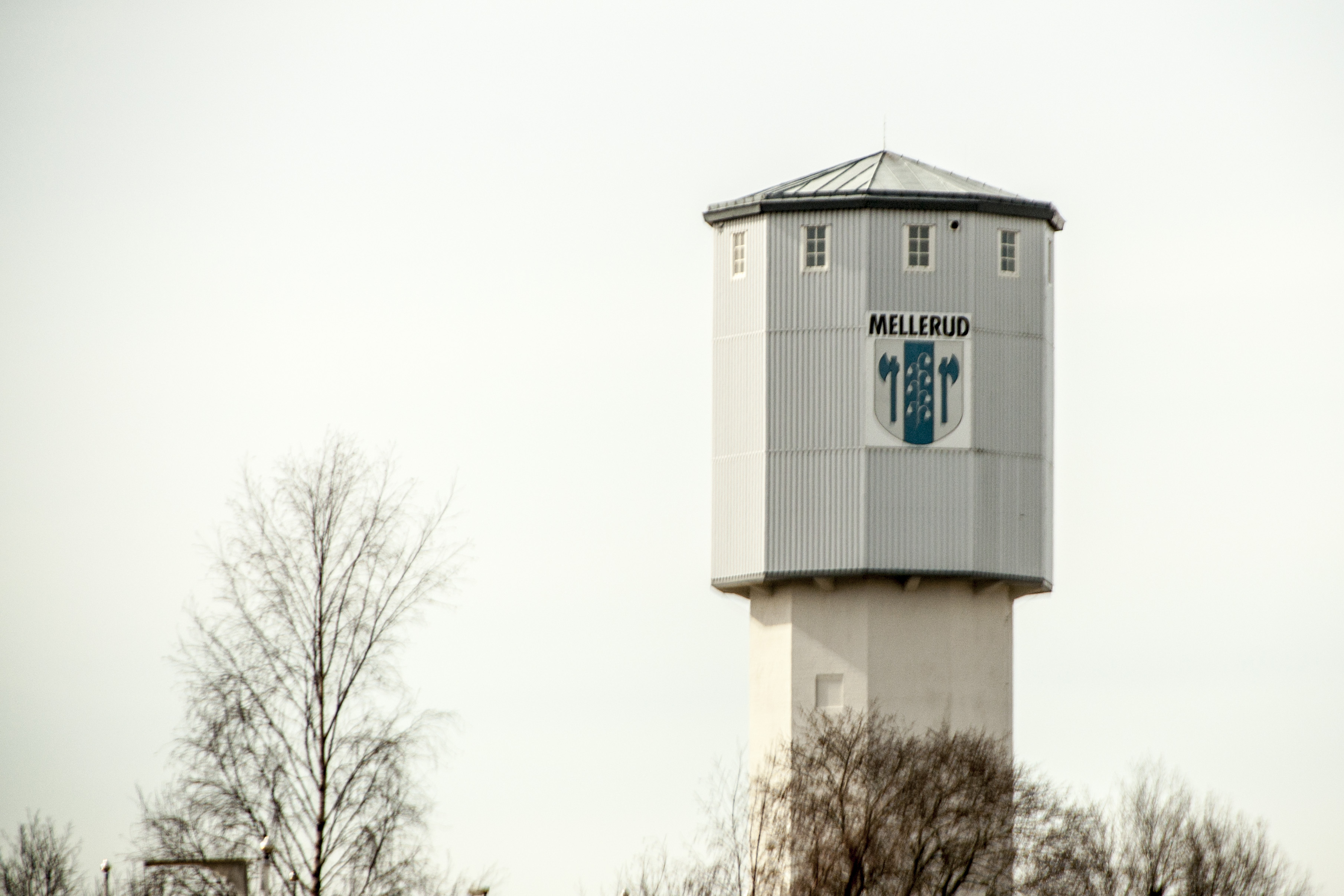

- Location within Västra Götaland Location within Sweden
- Coordinates: 58°42′N 12°28′E
- Country: Sweden
- Province: Dalsland
- County: Västra Götaland County
- Municipality: Mellerud Municipality

Area
  - Total: 3.10 km^{2} (1.20 sq mi)

Population (31 December 2010)
  - Total: 3,750
  - Density: 1,211/km^{2} (3,140/sq mi)
- Time zone: UTC+1 (CET)
  - Summer (DST): UTC+2 (CEST)
- Climate: Cfb

Mellerud is a locality and the seat of Mellerud Municipality, Västra Götaland County, Sweden. It had 9,052 inhabitants in 2024.

== Sports ==
- Melleruds IF, Swedish football club
- Åsebro IF, Swedish football club
