= Melleruds IF =

Swedish football club

- Full name: Melleruds Idrottsförening
- Founded: 1908
- Ground: Rådavallen; Mellerud; Sweden
- Chairman: Tommy Johansson
- Head coach: Markus Svensson
- Coach: Claes-Göran Emanuelsson
- League: Division 3 Nordvästra Götaland
- 2010: Division 3 Nordvästra Götaland, 5th
Home colours	Away colours

Melleruds IF is a Swedish football club located in Mellerud in Västra Götaland County.

== Background ==
Melleruds Idrottsförening were founded on 28 July 1908 at a meeting in the Jacobssons café at Köpmantorget in Mellerud. The first club chairman was Eric Widlund.

Since their foundation Melleruds IF has participated mainly in the middle divisions of the Swedish football league system. The club currently plays in Division 3 Nordvästra Götaland which is the fifth tier of Swedish football. They play their home matches at the Rådavallen in Mellerud.

Melleruds IF are affiliated to the Dalslands Fotbollförbund.

== Recent history ==
In recent seasons Melleruds IF have competed in the following divisions:

2011 – Division III, Nordvästra Götaland
2010 – Division III, Nordvästra Götaland
2009 – Division II, Mellersta Götaland
2008 – Division II, Västra Götaland
2007 – Division II, Västra Götaland
2006 – Division III, Nordvästra Götaland
2005 – Division II, Västra Götaland
2004 – Division III, Nordvästra Götaland
2003 – Division II, Västra Götaland
2002 – Division III, Nordvästra Götaland
2001 – Division IV, Bohuslän/Dal
2000 – Division IV, Bohuslän/Dal
1999 – Division IV, Bohuslän/Dal
1998 – Division III, Nordvästra Götaland
1997 – Division III, Nordvästra Götaland
1996 – Division III, Nordvästra Götaland
1995 – Division II, Västra Götaland
1994 – Division II, Västra Götaland
1993 – Division II, Västra Götaland

== Attendances ==
In recent seasons Melleruds IF have had the following average attendances:

Season	Average attendance	Division / Section	Level
2001	Not available	Div 4 Bohuslän/Dal	Tier 5
2002	377	Div 3 Nordvästra Götaland	Tier 4
2003	445	Div 2 Västra Götaland	Tier 3
2004	285	Div 3 Nordvästra Götaland	Tier 4
2005	302	Div 2 Västra Götaland	Tier 3
2006	241	Div 3 Nordvästra Götaland	Tier 5
2007	233	Div 2 Västra Götaland	Tier 4
2008	223	Div 2 Västra Götaland	Tier 4
2009	177	Div 2 Mellersta Götaland	Tier 4
2010	252	Div 3 Nordvästra Götaland	Tier 5

* Attendances are provided in the Publikliga sections of the Svenska Fotbollförbundet website and European Football Statistics website.
