= Thomas Raun =

Danish footballer (born 1984)

Personal information
- Date of birth: June 29, 1984 (age 42)
- Place of birth: Vordingborg, Denmark
- Height: 1.76 m (5 ft 9 in)
- Position: Midfielder

Youth career
- Vordingborg IF
- Nykøbing Falster Alliancen
- 2002–2003: Silkeborg Fodbold College

Senior career*
Years	Team	Apps	(Gls)
2003–2008	Silkeborg IF	119	
2008–2010	Viborg FF	25	(1)
2010–2012	Landskrona BoIS	44	(5)
2012–2013	Brønshøj BK	17	(0)
2013–2014	B.93	7	(1)
- * Club domestic league appearances and goals as of April 15, 2015

Thomas Raun (born June 29, 1984) is a Danish former football midfielder. He started his career with Danish clubs Silkeborg IF and Viborg FF.
