= 2011 AIK Fotboll season =

AIK
2011 season
- Manager: Andreas Alm
- Stadium: Råsunda Stadium
- Allsvenskan: 2nd
- Svenska Cupen: Third round vs Åtvidaberg
- Top goalscorer: League: Teteh Bangura (15); All: Teteh Bangura (15)
- Highest home attendance: 24,639 vs Djurgården (19 September 2011)
- Lowest home attendance: 9,492 vs GAIS (1 October 2011)
- Average home league attendance: 13,865 (Allsvenskan - 16 October 2011); 13,865 (All competitions - 16 October 2011)

== Season events ==
On 23 November, Gabriel Özkan signed a new two-year contract with AIK, keeping him at the club until the end of 2013.

== Squad ==
As of match played 23 October 2011

No.	Name	Nationality	Position	Date of birth (Age)	Signed from	Signed in	Contract ends	Apps.	Goals
Goalkeepers
13	Kyriakos Stamatopoulos	(Canada)	GK	28 August 1979 (aged 32)	Tromsø	2011		12	0
27	Ivan Turina	(Croatia)	GK	3 October 1980 (aged 31)	Dinamo Zagreb	2010		43	0
76	Lee Baxter	(Sweden)	GK	17 June 1976 (aged 35)	Landskrona BoIS	2008			
Defenders
2	Niklas Backman	(Sweden)	DF	13 November 1988 (aged 22)	Väsby United	2010		62	1
3	Per Karlsson	(Sweden)	DF	2 January 1986 (aged 25)	Academy	2003			
4	Nils-Eric Johansson	(Sweden)	DF	13 January 1980 (aged 31)	Leicester City	2007		148	8
6	Alexander Milošević	(Sweden)	DF	30 January 1992 (aged 19)	Vasalund	2011	2014	29	0
16	Martin Lorentzson	(Sweden)	DF	21 July 1984 (aged 27)	Assyriska	2010		49	2
17	Jacob Ericsson	(Sweden)	DF	17 September 1993 (aged 18)	Väsby United	2011		0	0
23	Christoffer Eriksson	(Sweden)	DF	25 May 1990 (aged 21)	Väsby United	2010		8	0
Midfielders
5	Robert Persson	(Sweden)	MF	13 November 1979 (aged 31)	Malmö	2010			
7	Helgi Daníelsson	(Sweden)	MF	13 July 1981 (aged 30)	Hansa Rostock	2010		49	1
8	Daniel Tjernström	(Sweden)	MF	19 February 1974 (aged 37)	Örebro	1999			
14	Kenny Pavey	(England)	MF	23 August 1979 (aged 32)	Ljungskile	2006		149	15
18	Nicklas Maripuu	(Sweden)	MF	2 March 1992 (aged 19)	Väsby United	2010		14	0
24	Daniel Gustavsson	(Sweden)	MF	29 August 1990 (aged 21)	Västerås SK	2009		26	0
25	Robin Quaison	(Sweden)	MF	9 October 1993 (aged 18)	Academy	2011		0	0
28	Viktor Lundberg	(Sweden)	MF	4 March 1991 (aged 20)	Väsby United	2009		60	8
29	Gabriel Özkan	(Sweden)	MF	23 May 1986 (aged 25)	IF Brommapojkarna	2006	2013	61	10
31	Lalawélé Atakora	(Togo)	MF	9 November 1990 (aged 20)	Fredrikstad	2011	2014	7	1
Forwards
9	Martin Kayongo-Mutumba	(Sweden)	FW	15 June 1985 (aged 26)	Väsby United	2011	2013	73	7
12	Christian Kouakou	(Sweden)	FW	20 April 1995 (aged 16)	Academy	2011		0	0
21	Admir Ćatović	(Bosnia and Herzegovina)	FW	5 September 1987 (aged 24)	Väsby United	2010		30	2
22	Kwame Karikari	(Ghana)	FW	20 January 1992 (aged 19)	International Allies	2011	2014	19	2
Out on loan
15	Kevin Walker	(Sweden)	MF	3 August 1989 (aged 22)	Örebro	2007		28	1
26	Pontus Engblom	(Sweden)	FW	3 November 1991 (aged 19)	IFK Sundsvall	2009		27	2
Left during the season
19	Teteh Bangura	(Sierra Leone)	FW	27 December 1989 (aged 21)	Köping	2011	2013	18	15
20	Mohamed Bangura	(Sierra Leone)	FW	27 July 1989 (aged 22)	Kallon	2010		38	14

== Transfers ==
=== In ===
Date	Position	Nationality	Name	From	Fee	Ref.
1 January 2011	GK	(Canada)	Kyriakos Stamatopoulos	Tromsø	Undisclosed	
1 January 2011	FW	(Sierra Leone)	Teteh Bangura	Köping	Undisclosed	
1 February 2011	DF	(Sweden)	Alexander Milošević	Vasalund	Undisclosed	
3 February 2011	FW	(Sweden)	Martin Kayongo-Mutumba	Videoton	Undisclosed	
1 April 2011	FW	(Ghana)	Kwame Karikari	Inter Allies	Undisclosed	
5 October 2011	FW	(Sierra Leone)	Alhassan Kamara	Kallon	Undisclosed	
1 November 2011	MF	(Togo)	Lalawélé Atakora	Fredrikstad	Undisclosed	

=== Loans in ===
Start date	Position	Nationality	Name	From	End date	Ref.
18 August 2011	MF	(Togo)	Lalawélé Atakora	Fredrikstad	31 December 2011	

=== Out ===
Date	Position	Nationality	Name	To	Fee	Ref.
13 January 2011	GK	(Finland)	Tomi Maanoja	Honka	Undisclosed	
8 August 2011	FW	(Sierra Leone)	Teteh Bangura	Bursaspor	Undisclosed	
30 August 2011	FW	(Sierra Leone)	Mohamed Bangura	Celtic	Undisclosed	

=== Loans out ===
Start date	Position	Nationality	Name	To	End date	Ref.
21 January 2011	FW	(Brazil)	Antônio Flávio	São Caetano	31 December 2011	
28 March 2011	MF	(Sweden)	Pontus Engblom	GIF Sundsvall	31 December 2011	
31 August 2011	MF	(Sweden)	Kevin Walker	GIF Sundsvall	31 December 2011	

=== Released ===
Date	Position	Nationality	Name	Joined	Date	Ref
26 January 2011	FW	(Croatia)	Goran Ljubojević	Osijek		
31 December 2011	DF	(Sweden)	Christoffer Eriksson	Degerfors	1 January 2012	
31 December 2011	MF	(England)	Kenny Pavey	Ljungskile		
31 December 2011	MF	(Sweden)	Yussuf Saleh	Syrianska		
31 December 2011	MF	(Sweden)	Kevin Walker	GIF Sundsvall	1 January 2012	

== Friendlies ==
5 February 2011	AIK	1–1	Västerås SK	Stockholm
13:00 CET (UTC+1)	Engblom 25'; Bangura (yellow card) 33'	Report	Danielson (yellow card) 47'; Mete 60'	Stadium: Skytteholms IP; Attendance: 2,712; Referee: Dragan Banjac

12 February 2011	GIF Sundsvall	0–3	AIK	Sundsvall
15:00 CET (UTC+1)		Report	Catovic 35'; Saleh 51'; Lundberg 60'; Pavey (yellow card) 79'; Daníelsson (yellow card)	Stadium: Norrporten Arena; Attendance: 400; Referee: Lars Olsson

19 February 2011	AIK	2–0	Syrianska	Stockholm
13:00 CET (UTC+1)	M.Bangura 20', 31'; Pavey (yellow card) 82'	Report	Özdemirok (yellow card)	Stadium: Skytteholms IP; Attendance: 1,522

23 February 2011	AIK	4–1	Vasalund	Stockholm
15:00 CET (UTC+1)	Gustavsson 7'; Walker (penalty missed) 51'; Genc 51'; Tjernström 59'; Ericsson 77'	Report	Malmborg 25'; Ali (yellow card) 33'; Sadi (yellow card) 73'	Stadium: Skytteholms IP; Attendance: 500; Referee: Dragan Banjac

26 February 2011	AIK	5–0	Flora Tallinn	Stockholm
13:30 CET (UTC+1)	Persson 2', 34'; M.Bangura 16'; Lundberg 64'; Walker 78'	Report		Stadium: Skytteholms IP; Attendance: 1,587; Referee: Dragan Banjac

5 March 2011	AIK	1–3	Örebro	Stockholm
13:00 CET (UTC+1)	T.Bangura 10' (yellow card) 63'	Report	Nordback 18', 54'; Turina 38' (o.g.); Wikström (yellow card) 59'; Bedoya (yellow card) 83'	Stadium: Skytteholms IP; Attendance: 1,832; Referee: Mohammed Al-Hakim

12 March 2011	Kalmar FF	3–0	AIK	Antalya
14:30 CET (UTC+1)	Mendes 11'; Sobralense 33', 88'	Report		Stadium: Adora Golf Resort Hotel; Attendance: 20; Referee: Feyzi Uygun

15 March 2011	Dnepr Mogilev	1–0	AIK	Antalya
15:30 CET (UTC+1)	40'; (yellow card) 80'	Report		Stadium: Adora Golf Resort Hotel; Attendance: 20; Referee: Feyzi Uygun

27 March 2011	AIK	5–1	IFK Mariehamn	Stockholm
13:00 CET (UTC+1)	Catovic (yellow card) 9' (goal) 11', 66'; Trafford (yellow card) 14'; Persson 64'; Gustavsson 77'; Lundberg 87'	Report	Bellisomo (yellow card) 7'; Strandvall (yellow card) 62'; Johansson 78' (o.g.)	Stadium: Skytteholms IP; Attendance: 711; Referee: Dragan Banjac

6 April 2011	AIK	4–1	Arameisk-Syrianska	Stockholm
18:30 CET (UTC+1)	T.Bangura 25', 35', 55'; Catovic 80'	Report	Bangora 50'	Stadium: Skytteholms IP; Attendance: 200

18 July 2011	Assyriska FF	2–4	AIK	Stockholm
15:00 CET (UTC+1)	da Silva Santana 23', 63'; Yarar (yellow card) 69'	Report	Kouakou 47'; Quaison 67'; Ålund 81'; Massa 85'	Stadium: Skytteholms IP; Attendance: 70; Referee: Tony Neander

1 November 2011	AIK	4–0	Karlberg	Stockholm
16:00 CET (UTC+1)	Goal	Report		Stadium: Skytteholms IP

== Competitions ==
=== Overview ===
Competition	First match	Last match	Starting round	Final position	Record							
Competition	First match	Last match	Starting round	Final position	Pld	W	D	L	GF	GA	GD	Win %
Allsvenskan	4 April 2011	23 October 2011	Matchday 1	Runners-up	30	18	4	8	46	27	+19	60.00
Svenska Cupen	10 May 2011	10 May 2011	Third round	Third round	1	0	0	1	0	3	−3	0.00
Total					31	18	4	9	46	30	+16	58.06

Last updated: 23 October 2011
Source: Competitions

=== Allsvenskan ===
==== League table ====
Locations of the 2011 Allsvenskan teams

Pos	Team	Pld	W	D	L	GF	GA	GD	Pts	Qualification or relegation
1	Helsingborgs IF (C)	30	18	9	3	55	27	+28	63	Qualification to Champions League second qualifying round
2	AIK	30	18	4	8	46	27	+19	58	Qualification to Europa League second qualifying round (Note: AIK qualified for the second qualifying round of the UEFA Europa League as they received the qualifying spot reserved for the winner of 2011 Svenska Cupen, as cup winner Helsingborg were already qualified to the UEFA Champions League through winning Allsvenskan. Kalmar FF, Svenska Cupen runners-up 2011, qualified for the first qualifying round of the UEFA Europa League.)
3	IF Elfsborg	30	18	3	9	52	32	+20	57	Qualification to Europa League first qualifying round
4	Malmö FF	30	15	9	6	37	30	+7	54	
5	GAIS	30	16	3	11	47	34	+13	51	

Source: svenskfotboll.se (in Swedish)
Rules for classification: 1) points; 2) goal difference; 3) number of goals scored.
(C) Champions

==== Results summary ====
Overall								Home						Away					
Pld	W	D	L	GF	GA	GD	Pts	W	D	L	GF	GA	GD	W	D	L	GF	GA	GD
30	18	4	8	46	27	+19	58	12	0	3	27	8	+19	6	4	5	19	19	0

Last updated: 23 October 2011.
Source: Results

==== Results by matchday ====
Matchday	1	2	3	4	5	6	7	8	9	10	11	12	13	14	15	16	17	18	19	20	21	22	23	24	25	26	27	28	29	30
Ground	A	H	A	H	A	H	A	H	H	A	H	A	H	A	A	H	A	H	H	A	A	H	H	A	A	H	A	H	H	A
Result	D	W	D	W	L	W	L	W	L	L	W	L	W	W	W	W	W	W	L	L	W	W	W	W	W	L	D	W	W	D
Position	8	4	8	6	6	4	7	4	6	9	7	8	8	6	5	3	3	3	3	3	3	3	3	3	3	3	2	3	2	2

Updated to match(es) played on 23 October 2011. Source: Results
A = Away; H = Home; W = Win; D = Draw; L = Loss; P = Postponed

==== Results ====
4 April 2011 1	Djurgården	0–0	AIK	Stockholm
20:00 CEST (UTC+2)	Ceesay (yellow card) 33'	Report		Stadium: Råsunda Stadium; Attendance: 29,931; Referee: Jonas Eriksson

10 April 2011 2	AIK	3–0	Mjällby	Stockholm
14:00 CET (UTC+1)	Lundberg 40'; T.Bangura 41', 62' (yellow card) 41'; Persson (yellow card) 45+1'	Report	El Kabir (yellow card) 45'; Gitselov (yellow card) 45'; Grahn (yellow card) 59'; Westerberg (yellow card) 90+1'	Stadium: Råsunda Stadion; Attendance: 11,966; Referee: Daniel Stålhammar

17 April 2011 3	Elfsborg	2–2	AIK	Borås
16:30 CEST (UTC+2)	Hult 33'; Elm 64'	Report	M.Bangura 25', 31' (yellow card) 85'; Baxter (red card) 44'; Turina (yellow card) 68'; Johansson (yellow card) 75'	Stadium: Borås Arena; Attendance: 10,086; Referee: Daniel Stålhammar

21 April 2011 4	AIK	2–0	IFK Göteborg	Stockholm
19:00 CEST (UTC+2)	Johansson 17'; Persson (yellow card) 44'; T.Bangura 57'; Lorentzson (yellow card) 79'; Pavey (yellow card) 85'	Report	Svensson (yellow card) 17'; Johansson (yellow card) 28'; Selaković (yellow card) 60'	Stadium: Råsunda Stadion; Attendance: 17,375; Referee: Stefan Johannesson

25 April 2011 5	Syrianska	3–0	AIK	Södertälje
15:00 CEST (UTC+2)	Barsom (yellow card) 12'; Felić 18'	Report	Pavey (yellow card) 12'; T.Bangura (red card) 19'	Stadium: Södertälje Fotbollsarena; Attendance: 5,626; Referee: Martin Strömbergsson
Note: Match was abandoned in the 20th minute, and later awarded as a 3-0 technical victory for Syrianska on 12 May 2011.

2 May 2011 6	AIK	1–0	Örebro	Stockholm
19:00 CEST (UTC+2)	Persson (yellow card) 61'; Pavey 90+2'	Report	Kihlberg (yellow card) 57'; Haginge (yellow card) 74'	Stadium: Råsunda Stadion; Attendance: 10,319; Referee: Michael Lerjéus

7 May 2011 7	BK Häcken	3–1	AIK	Gothenburg
14:00 CEST (UTC+2)	Makondele 31'; Elvby (yellow card) 50'; Wahlström 74'; Waris 83'	Report	Pavey (yellow card) 51'; Daníelsson (yellow card) 76'; Ranégie 87' (o.g.)	Stadium: Rambergsvallen; Attendance: 3,317; Referee: Johan Hamlin

16 May 2011 8	AIK	2–1	Helsingborg	Stockholm
19:00 CEST (UTC+2)	Johansson (yellow card) 13' (yellow-red card) 28'; T.Bangura 24'; Persson 39'; Turina (yellow card) 90+1'	Report	Andersson 19'; Nilsson (yellow card) 82'; Wahlstedt (yellow card) 83'; Mahlangu (yellow card) 90+2'	Stadium: Råsunda Stadion; Attendance: 10,875; Referee: Michael Lerjéus

21 May 2011 9	AIK	0–2	Gefle	Stockholm
16:00 CEST (UTC+2)		Report	Dahlberg 11', 41'; Chibsah (yellow card) 66'	Stadium: Råsunda Stadion; Attendance: 11,247; Referee: Martin Hansson

25 May 2011 10	Kalmar FF	1–0	AIK	Kalmar
19:00 CEST (UTC+2)	Fagercrantz 44'; Carlsson (yellow card) 51'; Sobralense (yellow card) 73' (yellow-red card) 90+3'; Rydström (yellow card) 90+1'	Report	T.Bangura (yellow card) 25'; Persson (yellow card) 53'; Johansson (yellow card) 65'	Stadium: Fredriksskans; Attendance: 10,107; Referee: Martin Ingvarsson

12 June 2011 11	AIK	2–0	Malmö	Stockholm
19:00 CEST (UTC+2)	M.Bangura 17'; T.Bangura 46'	Report	Durmaz (yellow card) 15'; Vinzents (yellow card) 55'; Rexhepi (yellow card) 90'	Stadium: Råsunda Stadion; Attendance: 16,739; Referee: Martin Hansson

19 June 2011 12	GAIS	2–0	AIK	Gothenburg
19:00 CEST (UTC+2)	Mårtensson (yellow card) 37'; Santos (yellow card) 40' (goal) 68', 82'	Report	Johansson (yellow card) 32'; M.Bangura (yellow card) 35'; Backman (yellow card) 56'	Stadium: Gamla Ullevi; Attendance: 4,582; Referee: Martin Hansson

22 June 2011 13	AIK	3–0	IFK Norrköping	Stockholm
19:00 CEST (UTC+2)	T.Bangura 29', 35'; M.Bangura 37' (yellow card) 54'; Persson (yellow card) 47'; Karikari (yellow card) 88'	Report	Wikström (yellow card) 37'	Stadium: Råsunda Stadion; Attendance: 11,078; Referee: Stefan Johannesson

26 June 2011 14	Trelleborg	1–2	AIK	Trelleborg
19:00 CEST (UTC+2)	Koroma (yellow card) 22' (goal) 24'; Andersson (yellow card) 25'; Abelsson (yellow card) 34'; Demir (yellow card) 59'; Ingves (yellow card) 64'	Report	Lorentzson 50'; Persson (yellow card) 71'; T.Bangura 77'	Stadium: Vångavallen; Attendance: 2,395; Referee: Tobias Mattsson

3 July 2011 15	Halmstad	1–3	AIK	Halmstad
19:00 CEST (UTC+2)	Sise 17'	Report	M.Bangura 33'; T.Bangura 48', 86'	Stadium: Örjans Vall; Attendance: 6,119; Referee: Jonas Eriksson

11 July 2011 16	AIK	4–0	Halmstad	Stockholm
19:00 CEST (UTC+2)	T.Bangura 13', 15', 44', 57'	Report		Stadium: Råsunda Stadion; Attendance: 13,668; Referee: Martin Ingvarsson

17 July 2011 17	Gefle	0–3	AIK	Gävle
16:30 CEST (UTC+2)	Abdullai (yellow card) 14'; Hugosson (yellow card) 90+2'	Report	Johansson (yellow card) 52'; Persson 57'; Kayongo-Mutumba 68'; T.Bangura 71'	Stadium: Strömvallen; Attendance: 7,098; Referee: Jonas Eriksson

24 July 2011 18	AIK	2–1	Kalmar FF	Stockholm
16:30 CEST (UTC+2)	Persson 3'; T.Bangura 35'; Lorentzson (yellow card) 37'	Report	Sobralense 80'	Stadium: Råsunda Stadion; Attendance: 14,818; Referee: Stefan Johannesson

31 July 2011 19	AIK	0–1	Elfsborg	Stockholm
19:00 CEST (UTC+2)	T.Bangura (yellow card) 23'; Persson (yellow card) 35'; Kayongo-Mutumba (yellow card) 67'	Report	Nilsson 4'; Hult (yellow card) 45'; Svensson (yellow card) 69'; Keene (yellow card) 88'; Klarström (yellow card) 90'	Stadium: Råsunda Stadion; Attendance: 18,815; Referee: Michael Lerjéus

4 August 2011 20	IFK Göteborg	3–1	AIK	Gothenburg
19:00 CEST (UTC+2)	Selaković 5'; Eriksson 20'; Hysén 52'	Report	M.Bangura 2'; Karlsson (yellow card) 19'; Persson (yellow card) 82'	Stadium: Gamla Ullevi; Attendance: 13,918; Referee: Jonas Eriksson

15 August 2011 21	IFK Norrköping	0–1	AIK	Norrköping
19:00 CEST (UTC+2)	Whass (yellow card) 72'; Þorvaldsson (yellow card) 74' da Cruz (yellow card) 87' (yellow-red card) 89'; Tanković (yellow card) 90+3'	Report	Karikari 38'	Stadium: PlatinumCars Arena; Attendance: 10,808; Referee: Martin Hansson

21 August 2011 22	AIK	3–0	Trelleborg	Stockholm
16:30 CEST (UTC+2)	Kayongo-Mutumba (yellow card) 12'; Johansson 29'; Persson 59'; Özkan 89'	Report	Abelsson (yellow card) 40'	Stadium: Råsunda Stadion; Attendance: 10,410; Referee: Jonas Eriksson

28 August 2011 29	AIK	1–0	Syrianska	Stockholm
16:30 CEST (UTC+2)	Gustavsson (yellow card) 22'; Persson 90+1'	Report	Bååth (yellow card) 32'; Ristić (yellow card) 57'; Sağlık (red card) 81'	Stadium: Råsunda Stadion; Attendance: 12,023; Referee: Daniel Stålhammar

12 September 2011 30	Örebro	1–2	AIK	Örebro
19:00 CEST (UTC+2)	Riski (yellow card) 20' (goal) 48'; Nordback (yellow card) 83'	Report	Daníelsson (yellow card) 43'; Milošević (yellow card) 44'; Lundberg 58'; Ćatović (yellow card) 58' (goal) 74'	Stadium: Behrn Arena; Attendance: 9,517; Referee: Martin Hansson

15 September 2011 26	Mjällby	0–2	AIK	Hällevik
19:00 CEST (UTC+2)	Osiako (yellow card) 38'; Nicklasson (yellow card) 88'	Report	Lantz 54' (o.g.); Kayongo-Mutumba 89'	Stadium: Strandvallen; Attendance: 3,239; Referee: Andreas Ekberg

19 September 2011 25	AIK	0–1	Djurgården	Stockholm
19:00 CEST (UTC+2)	Milošević (yellow card) 61'; Pavey (yellow card) 87'; Backman (yellow card) 90+1'	Report	Nymann (yellow card) 13'; Igboananike 20' (yellow card) 81'; Youssef (yellow card) 52'; Guira (yellow card) 90'	Stadium: Råsunda Stadion; Attendance: 24,639; Referee: Jonas Eriksson

25 September 2011 27	Malmö	1–1	AIK	Malmö
16:30 CEST (UTC+2)	Mehmeti (yellow card) 78'; Ranégie 90+2'; Jansson (yellow card) 90+4'; Aubynn (yellow card) 90+4'	Report	Atakora (yellow card) 33'; Backman 84'; Turina (yellow card) 90+3'; Lorentzson (yellow card) 90+3'	Stadium: Swedbank Stadion; Attendance: 10,887; Referee: Daniel Stålhammar

1 October 2011 28	AIK	2–1	GAIS	Stockholm
16:00 CEST (UTC+2)	Atakora 9'; Özkan 63'; Daníelsson (yellow card) 65'; Karikari (yellow card) 86'	Report	Çelik (yellow card) 32' (goal) 83'; Wánderson (yellow card) 86'	Stadium: Råsunda Stadion; Attendance: 9,492; Referee: Daniel Stålhammar

16 October 2011 23	AIK	2–1	BK Häcken	Stockholm
16:30 CEST (UTC+2)	Kayongo-Mutumba 14'; Karikari 33'; Johansson (yellow card) 38'; Persson (yellow card) 80'; Pavey (yellow card) 88'	Report	Lind (red card) 12'; Williams 45+1'	Stadium: Råsunda Stadion; Attendance: 14,517; Referee: Jonas Eriksson

23 October 2011 24	Helsingborg	1–1	AIK	Helsingborg
16:30 CEST (UTC+2)	Santos 42'	Report	Daníelsson 3'; Johansson (yellow card) 23'; Lorentzson (yellow card) 82'	Stadium: Olympia; Attendance: 16,530; Referee: Markus Strömbergsson

=== Svenska Cupen ===
10 May 2011 Third Round	Åtvidaberg	3–0	AIK	Åtvidaberg
19:30 CEST (UTC+2)	Prodell 24'; Möller (yellow card) 84' (goal) 90'; Radetinac 90+2'	Report	Backman (yellow card) 90+1'	Stadium: Kopparvallen; Attendance: 1,815; Referee: Jim Pettersson

== Squad statistics ==
As of match played 23 October 2011

=== Appearances and goals ===
No.	Pos	Nat	Player	Total		Allsvenskan		Svenska Cupen	
No.	Pos	Nat	Player	Apps	Goals	Apps	Goals	Apps	Goals
2	DF	(Sweden) SWE	Niklas Backman	31	1	30	1	1	0
3	DF	(Sweden) SWE	Per Karlsson	7	0	4+2	0	1	0
4	DF	(Sweden) SWE	Nils-Eric Johansson	29	2	28	2	1	0
5	MF	(Sweden) SWE	Robert Persson	25	5	23+1	5	1	0
6	DF	(Sweden) SWE	Alexander Milošević	29	0	29	0	0	0
7	MF	(Iceland) ISL	Helgi Daníelsson	26	1	23+2	1	1	0
8	MF	(Sweden) SWE	Daniel Tjernström	18	0	16+2	0	0	0
9	FW	(Sweden) SWE	Martin Kayongo-Mutumba	29	3	26+2	3	1	0
13	GK	(Canada) CAN	Kyriakos Stamatopoulos	7	0	6	0	1	0
14	MF	(England) ENG	Kenny Pavey	22	1	11+10	1	0+1	0
16	DF	(Sweden) SWE	Martin Lorentzson	30	1	29	1	1	0
18	MF	(Sweden) SWE	Nicklas Maripuu	12	0	2+10	0	0	0
21	FW	(Bosnia and Herzegovina) BIH	Admir Ćatović	14	1	4+9	1	0+1	0
22	FW	(Ghana) GHA	Kwame Karikari	19	2	9+9	2	0+1	0
24	MF	(Sweden) SWE	Daniel Gustavsson	15	0	10+5	0	0	0
27	GK	(Croatia) CRO	Ivan Turina	24	0	24	0	0	0
28	MF	(Sweden) SWE	Viktor Lundberg	24	2	17+7	2	0	0
29	MF	(Sweden) SWE	Gabriel Özkan	6	2	0+6	2	0	0
31	MF	(Togo) TOG	Lalawélé Atakora	7	1	4+3	1	0	0
Players away on loan:
15	MF	(Sweden) SWE	Kevin Walker	9	0	0+8	0	1	0
Players who appeared for AIK but left during the season:
19	FW	(Sierra Leone) SLE	Teteh Bangura	18	15	16+1	15	1	0
20	FW	(Sierra Leone) SLE	Mohamed Bangura	21	7	19+1	7	1	0

=== Goal scorers ===
Place	Position	Nation	Number	Name	Allsvenskan	Svenska Cupen	Total
1	FW	(Sierra Leone)	19	Teteh Bangura	15	0	15
2	FW	(Sierra Leone)	20	Mohamed Bangura	7	0	7
3	MF	(Sweden)	5	Robert Persson	5	0	5
4	FW	(Sweden)	9	Martin Kayongo-Mutumba	3	0	3
5	FW	(Sweden)	28	Viktor Lundberg	2	0	2
5	DF	(Sweden)	4	Nils-Eric Johansson	2	0	2
5	FW	(Ghana)	22	Kwame Karikari	2	0	2
5	MF	(Sweden)	29	Gabriel Özkan	2	0	2
5				Own goal	2	0	2
10	MF	(England)	14	Kenny Pavey	1	0	1
10	DF	(Sweden)	16	Martin Lorentzson	1	0	1
10	FW	(Sweden)	21	Admir Ćatović	1	0	1
10	DF	(Sweden)	2	Niklas Backman	1	0	1
10	MF	(Togo)	31	Lalawélé Atakora	1	0	1
10	MF	(Iceland)	7	Helgi Daníelsson	1	0	1
TOTALS					46	0	46

=== Clean sheets ===
Place	Position	Nation	Number	Name	Allsvenskan	Svenska Cupen	Total
1	GK	(Croatia)	27	Ivan Turina	10	0	10
2	GK	(Canada)	13	Kyriakos Stamatopoulos	2	0	2
TOTALS					12	0	12

=== Disciplinary record ===
Number	Nation	Position	Name	Allsvenskan		Svenska Cupen		Total	
Number	Nation	Position	Name	Booked	Sent off (straight red)	Booked	Sent off (straight red)	Booked	Sent off (straight red)
2	(Sweden)	DF	Niklas Backman	2	0	1	0	3	0
3	(Sweden)	DF	Per Karlsson	1	0	0	0	1	0
4	(Sweden)	DF	Nils-Eric Johansson	8	1	0	0	8	1
5	(Sweden)	MF	Robert Persson	10	0	0	0	10	0
6	(Sweden)	DF	Alexander Milošević	2	0	0	0	2	0
7	(Iceland)	MF	Helgi Daníelsson	3	0	0	0	3	0
9	(Sweden)	FW	Martin Kayongo-Mutumba	1	0	0	0	1	0
14	(England)	MF	Kenny Pavey	5	0	0	0	5	0
16	(Sweden)	DF	Martin Lorentzson	4	0	0	0	4	0
21	(Sweden)	FW	Admir Ćatović	1	0	0	0	1	0
22	(Ghana)	FW	Kwame Karikari	2	0	0	0	2	0
24	(Sweden)	MF	Daniel Gustavsson	1	0	0	0	1	0
27	(Croatia)	GK	Ivan Turina	3	0	0	0	3	0
31	(Togo)	MF	Lalawélé Atakora	1	0	0	0	1	0
76	(Sweden)	GK	Lee Baxter	0	1	0	0	0	1
Players away on loan:
Players who left AIK during the season:
19	(Sierra Leone)	FW	Teteh Bangura	3	1	0	0	3	1
20	(Sierra Leone)	FW	Mohamed Bangura	3	0	0	0	3	0
Total				50	3	1	0	51	3
