= 2011 Svenska Cupen final =

- Event: 2011 Svenska Cupen
Helsingborgs IF	Kalmar FF
3	1
- Date: 5 November 2011
- Venue: Olympia, Helsingborg
- Referee: Markus Strömbergsson (Gävle)
- Attendance: 9,513

The 2011 Svenska Cupen final was a football match held at Olympia, Helsingborg on 5 November 2011. The match was the final of the 2011 Svenska Cupen and was played between Helsingborgs IF and Kalmar FF.

Goals from Álvaro Santos, May Mahlangu and Christoffer Andersson saw Helsingborgs IF, the defending champions, win the match 3–1 to retain the trophy. Erik Israelsson scored for Kalmar FF.

== Background ==
Helsingborgs IF had reached the final of the Svenska Cupen on six previous occasions and had won the trophy five times. They were the defending champions after defeating Hammarby IF 1–0 in the final at Söderstadion in Stockholm. The only previous time they had finished as runners-up was in 1994 when they lost 4–3 after sudden death extra time to IFK Norrköping in the final.

Kalmar FF had reached the final of the Svenska Cupen on five previous occasions and had won the trophy three times. Their last appearance in the final in 2008 had finished goalless but they lost on penalties to IFK Göteborg. That had been a replay of the final from the year before in which Kalmar FF had also faced IFK Göteborg. However, on that occasion, Kalmar had won 3–0 to lift the trophy.

== Road to the final ==
=== Helsingborgs IF ===
In the third round, Helsingborgs IF required extra time to defeat Landskrona BoIS 4–2 after the match had finished 1–1 in 90 minutes. They then defeated Trelleborgs FF 2–1 in the fourth round. They faced IF Elfsborg in the quarter-finals and won 2–0 before defeating Örebro SK 3–1 in the semi-finals to advance to the final.

=== Kalmar FF ===
Kalmar FF began the competition with a 1–0 win against IK Sirius in the third round. They then defeated IFK Norrköping 2–0 in the fourth round. After a 1–1 draw after extra time in their quarter-final, Kalmar FF defeated Malmö FF 4–3 on penalties to advance to the semi-finals. They then reached the final by beating IFK Göteborg 4–3 after extra time.

Helsingborgs IF		Round	Kalmar FF
Opponent	Result		Opponent	Result
Landskrona BoIS	4–2 (a.e.t.)	Round 3	IK Sirius	1–0
Trelleborgs FF	2–1	Round 4	IFK Norrköping	2–0
IF Elfsborg	2–0	Quarter-finals	Malmö FF	1–1 (a.e.t.) (4–3 pen)
Örebro SK	3–1	Semi-finals	IFK Göteborg	4–3 (a.e.t.)

== Match details ==
5 November 2011
15:30

Helsingborgs IF	3–1	Kalmar FF
Santos 26'; Mahlangu 55'; Andersson 80' (pen.)		Israelsson 45'

Olympia, Helsingborg
Attendance: 9,513
Referee: Markus Strömbergsson (Gävle)

Helsingborg	Kalmar

HELSINGBORG:
GK	30	(Sweden) Pär Hansson (c)
DF	21	(Sweden) Christoffer Andersson
DF	23	(Sweden) Erik Wahlstedt
DF	24	(Norway) Erlend Hanstveit
DF	15	(Sweden) Marcus Holgersson
DF	16	(Sweden) Joseph Baffo		(substituted off) 61'
MF	13	(Netherlands) Rachid Bouaouzan
MF	8	(Norway) Ardian Gashi	(yellow card) 63'
MF	6	(South Africa) May Mahlangu
FW	10	(Brazil) Álvaro Santos		(substituted off) 80'
FW	11	(Norway) Thomas Sørum		(substituted off) 68'
Substitutes:
MF	7	(Sweden) Mattias Lindström		(substituted in) 61'
FW	9	(Sweden) Erik Sundin		(substituted in) 68'
DF	5	(Finland) Hannu Patronen		(substituted in) 83'
GK	1	(Sweden) Daniel Andersson
FW	3	(Iceland) Guðjón Pétur Lýðsson
MF	18	(Norway) Jørgen Skjelvik
MF	28	(Sweden) Simon Thern
Manager:
(Sweden) Conny Karlsson

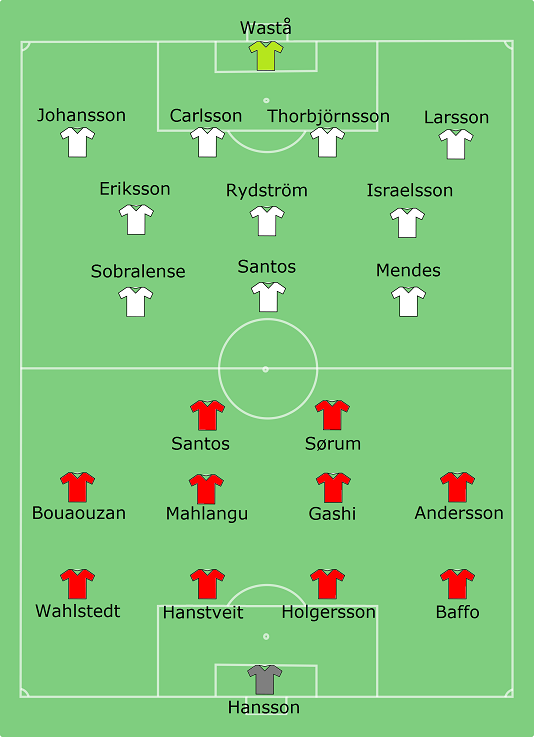

KALMAR:
GK	1	(Sweden) Petter Wastå	(yellow card) 80'
DF	5	(Sweden) Tobias Carlsson
DF	9	(Sweden) Stefan Larsson
DF	2	(Sweden) Markus Thorbjörnsson
DF	23	(Sweden) Mattias Johansson
MF	8	(Sweden) Henrik Rydström(c)
MF	12	(Brazil) Daniel Sobralense	(yellow card) 39' (yellow-red card) 86'
MF	25	(Sweden) Tobias Eriksson
MF	4	(Sweden) Erik Israelsson	(yellow card) 33'
FW	17	(Brazil) Daniel Mendes		(substituted off) 82'
FW	19	(Brazil) Ricardo Santos		(substituted off) 81'
Substitutes:
FW	34	(Sweden) Måns Söderqvist		(substituted in) 81'
FW	11	(Nigeria) Abiola Dauda		(substituted in) 82'
DF	6	(Finland) Paulus Arajuuri
MF	7	(Sweden) Kristoffer Fagercrantz
DF	18	(Sweden) Johan Bertilsson
DF	26	(Sweden) Emin Nouri
GK	99	(Kosovo) Etrit Berisha
Manager:
(Sweden) Nanne Bergstrand

MATCH OFFICIALS

- Assistant referees:
  - Peter Vesterholm (Årsta)
  - Daniel Gustavsson (Mantorp)
- Fourth official: Kristoffer Karlsson (Gothenburg)

MATCH RULES

- 90 minutes.
- 30 minutes of extra-time if necessary.
- Penalty shoot-out if scores still level.
- Seven named substitutes.
- Maximum of three substitutions.

== See also ==
- 2011 Svenska Cupen
