= 2008 Svenska Cupen final =

- Event: 2008 Svenska Cupen
Kalmar FF	IFK Göteborg
0	0
- Date: 21 September 2008
- Venue: Fredriksskans, Kalmar
- Referee: Peter Fröjdfeldt
- Attendance: 7,158

The 2008 Svenska Cupen Final took place on 21 September 2008 at Fredriksskans, Kalmar. The match was contested by the then-leaders in Allsvenskan, Kalmar FF, and 4th placed IFK Göteborg. It was two years running that Kalmar and Göteborg met in the cup final and the latter match was played at Fredriksskans.

The 90 minutes plus extra time ended in a goalless draw. After four successive penalties for both teams, Göteborg keeper Kim Christensen saved Marcus Lindberg's penalty. Thereafter Pontus Wernbloom scored and secured the fifth Svenska Cupen title for IFK Göteborg of all time.

== Road to the Final ==
Kalmar FF		IFK Göteborg
IFK Östersund [D3] A 0-7	Second round	Skövde AIK [D1] A 1-2
IF Brommapojkarna [SE] H 2-0	Third round	Falkenbergs FF [SE] A 0-3 (AET)
Degerfors IF [SE] H 6-1	Fourth round	Ljungskile SK [AS] H 1-0
IF Elfsborg [AS] A 2-4	Quarter finals	GIF Sundsvall [AS] A 2-3
Hammarby IF [AS] A 0-1 (AET)	Semi finals	Enköpings SK [SE] A 0-3

- Square brackets [ ] represent the opposition's division.

== Match details ==
21 September 2008
15:00 CEST

Kalmar FF	0–0 (a.e.t.)	IFK Göteborg
	Report
Penalties
Rydström (penalty scored); Johansson (penalty scored); V. Elm (penalty scored); Sobralense (penalty scored); Lindberg (penalty missed)	4–5	(penalty scored) Alexandersson; (penalty scored) Christensen; (penalty scored) Sigurðsson; (penalty scored) Jónsson; (penalty scored) Wernbloom

Fredriksskans, Kalmar
Attendance: 7,158
Referee: Peter Fröjdfeldt

Kalmar FF	IFK Göteborg

GK	1	(Sweden) Petter Wastå
RB	2	(France) Arthur Sorin
CB	4	(Sweden) Marcus Lindberg
CB	3	(Sweden) Joachim Lantz
LB	26	(Sweden) Emin Nouri	(yellow card) 61'
RM	18	(Sweden) Rasmus Elm		(substituted off) 79'
CM	8	(Sweden) Henrik Rydström (c)
CM	17	(Sweden) Viktor Elm
CM	21	(Sweden) Lasse Johansson		(substituted off) 58'
LM	7	(Sweden) Jimmie Augustsson
FW	10	(Sweden) Patrik Ingelsten		(substituted off) 101'
Substitutes:
DF	9	(Sweden) Stefan Larsson		(substituted in) 101'
MF	12	(Brazil) Daniel Sobralense		(substituted in) 58'
FW	13	(Sweden) David Elm		(substituted in) 79'
Manager:
(Sweden) Nanne Bergstrand

GK	1	(Denmark) Kim Christensen
RB	16	(Sweden) Erik Lund
CB	5	(Sweden) Mattias Bjärsmyr
CB	22	(Iceland) Ragnar Sigurðsson
LB	14	(Iceland) Hjalmar Jónsson
RM	10	(Sweden) Niclas Alexandersson (c)
CM	19	(Sweden) Pontus Wernbloom
CM	8	(Sweden) Thomas Olsson		(substituted off) 62'
LM	6	(Sweden) Adam Johansson	(yellow card) 97'	(substituted off) 99'
FW	7	(Sweden) Tobias Hysén
FW	29	(Sweden) Robin Söder		(substituted off) 107'
Substitutes:
MF	9	(Sweden) Stefan Selakovic		(substituted in) 107'
MF	13	(Sweden) Gustav Svensson		(substituted in) 62'
FW	18	(Sweden) Jonas Wallerstedt		(substituted in) 99'
Manager:
(Sweden) Stefan Rehn (Sweden) Jonas Olsson

== See also ==
- 2008 Svenska Cupen
