= 2009 Svenska Supercupen =

- Event: Svenska Supercupen
Kalmar FF	IFK Göteborg
1	0
- Date: 21 March 2009
- Venue: Fredriksskans, Kalmar
- Referee: Stefan Johanneson
- Attendance: 2,305

2009 Svenska Supercupen (Swedish Super Cup 2009) was the 3rd edition of Svenska Supercupen annual football match that 2008 winners IFK Göteborg unsuccessfully defended its title losing to Allsvenskan champions Kalmar FF who successfully pursued the competition title, 1-0. The match was played on 21 March 2009 at Fredriksskans in Kalmar.

Daniel Mendes scored a late goal in the 89th minute the only game goal.

== Match facts ==
21 March 2009
16:00 CEST

Kalmar FF	1–0	IFK Göteborg
Mendes 89'	(Report)

Fredriksskans, Kalmar
Attendance: 2,305
Referee: Stefan Johanneson

Kalmar FF	IFK Göteborg

KALMAR FF:
GK	1	(Sweden) Petter Wastå
RB	25	(Sweden) Tobias Eriksson	(yellow card) 81'
CB	4	(Sweden) Marcus Lindberg	(yellow card) 66'
CB	3	(Sweden) Joachim Lantz
LB	9	(Sweden) Stefan Larsson
LM	35	(Brazil) Lourival Assis
DM	8	(Sweden) Henrik Rydström (c)	(yellow card) 87'
DM	13	(Sweden) David Elm	(yellow card) 21'	(substituted off) 80'
CM	12	(Brazil) Daniel Sobralense
RM	7	(Sweden) Jimmie Augustsson	(substituted off) 74'
FW	17	(Brazil) Daniel Mendes
Substitutes:
GK	45	(Sweden) Zlatan Azinovic
FW	11	(Nigeria) Abiola Dauda	(substituted in) 74'
MF	10	(Northern Ireland) Daryl Smylie	(substituted in) 80'
DF	26	(Sweden) Emin Nouri
DF	6	(Sweden) Mikael Eklund
Manager:
(Sweden) Nanne Bergstrand

IFK GÖTEBORG:
GK	1	(Denmark) Kim Christensen (c)
RB	16	(Sweden) Erik Lund
CB	5	(Sweden) Mattias Bjärsmyr
CB	10	(Iceland) Ragnar Sigurdsson
LB	6	(Sweden) Adam Johansson	(substituted off) 58'
CM	19	(Sweden) Pontus Wernbloom	(yellow card) 44'
CM	13	(Sweden) Gustav Svensson
CM	15	(Sweden) Jakob Johansson
FW	7	(Sweden) Tobias Hysén
FW	11	(Sweden) Robin Söder
FW	21	(Sweden) Niklas Bärkroth	(substituted off) 63'
Substitutes:
MF	8	(Sweden) Thomas Olsson	(substituted in) 58'
MF	22	(Sweden) Tobias Sana	(substituted in) 63'
Manager:
(Sweden) Jonas Olsson (Sweden) Stefan Rehn
