= Zlatan Azinović =

Swedish footballer

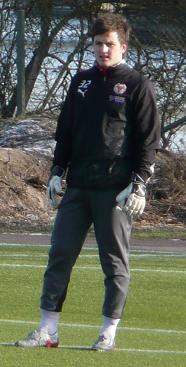
- Azinović playing for Kalmar FF in 2008

Personal information
- Full name: Zlatan Azinović
- Date of birth: 31 January 1988 (age 38)
- Place of birth: Kalmar, Sweden
- Height: 1.83 m (6 ft 0 in)
- Position: Goalkeeper

Youth career
- –1998: Persnäs AIF
- 1998–2005: Kalmar FF

Senior career*
Years	Team	Apps	(Gls)
2005–2011	Kalmar FF	3	(0)
2011	→ Trelleborgs FF (loan)	3	(0)
2012	Trelleborgs FF	12	(0)
2012	Malmö FF	0	(0)
2013	Kalmar FF	0	(0)
2014–2016	Malmö FF	5	(0)
2016	→ Ängelholms FF (loan)	0	(0)
Total		23	(0)

International career
2004–2005	Sweden U17	9	(0)
2005–2007	Sweden U19	14	(0)
2008–2009	Sweden U21	3	(0)
- * Club domestic league appearances and goals

Zlatan Azinović (born 31 January 1988) is a Swedish former professional footballer who played as a goalkeeper.

== Career ==
=== Kalmar FF ===
Azinović started his professional career at his home town club Kalmar FF in 2005. He was the second choice behind Petter Wastå and made three appearances for the club in Allsvenskan. In 2010 both Azinović and Wastå were outrivaled by Etrit Berisha.

=== Trelleborgs FF ===
In the middle of the 2011 season Azinović went to fellow Allsvenskan club Trelleborgs FF on loan from Kalmar. He made three appearances in his first season at the club. In 2012 Trelleborg decided to fully contract Azinović following his release from Kalmar FF and Trelleborg letting their first choice goalkeeper Viktor Noring go on loan to Malmö FF.

=== Malmö FF ===
On 22 August 2012 it was announced that Azinović would transfer to Allsvenskan club Malmö FF with a short-term contract for the rest of the 2012 season. Azinović made no first team appearance for Malmö FF before the end of the season when it was announced that the club would not extend his contract. After a brief spell back at Kalmar Azinović returned to Malmö FF and signed a two-year contract on 9 January 2014. Azinović made two appearances for Malmö FF during the season, in the home fixture against Örebro SK on 13 August 2014 and the final game of the season against Åtvidabergs FF on 1 November 2014. He announced his retirement from professional football in the summer of 2016 following a serious injury.

== Coaching career ==
In August 2016, Azinović was hired as goalkeeper coach at BK Höllviken. Later in September 2016, when the club's manager got fired, Azinović got also the role as assistant manager.

== Career statistics ==
Updated 4 July 2016.

Club	Season	League			Cup		Continental		Total	
Club	Season	Division	Apps	Goals	Apps	Goals	Apps	Goals	Apps	Goals
Kalmar FF	2005	Allsvenskan	0	0	—		—		0	0
Kalmar FF	2006	Allsvenskan	0	0	—		—		0	0
Kalmar FF	2007	Allsvenskan	0	0	—		—		0	0
Kalmar FF	2008	Allsvenskan	1	0	—		1	0	2	0
Kalmar FF	2009	Allsvenskan	0	0	—		0	0	0	0
Kalmar FF	2010	Allsvenskan	1	0	2	0	0	0	3	0
Kalmar FF	2011	Allsvenskan	1	0	0	0	—		1	0
Kalmar FF	Total		3	0	2	0	1	0	6	0
Trelleborgs FF	2011	Allsvenskan	3	0	0	0	—		3	0
Trelleborgs FF	2012	Superettan	12	0	0	0	—		12	0
Trelleborgs FF	Total		15	0	0	0	0	0	15	0
Malmö FF	2012	Allsvenskan	0	0	0	0	—		0	0
Malmö FF	Total		0	0	0	0	0	0	0	0
Kalmar FF	2013	Allsvenskan	0	0	0	0	—		0	0
Kalmar FF	Total		0	0	0	0	0	0	0	0
Malmö FF	2014	Allsvenskan	2	0	2	0	0	0	4	0
Malmö FF	2015	Allsvenskan	3	0	0	0	2	0	5	0
Malmö FF	Total		5	0	2	0	2	0	9	0
Ängelholms FF	2016	Superettan	0	0	0	0	—		0	0
Ängelholms FF	Total		0	0	0	0	0	0	0	0
Career total			23	0	4	0	3	0	30	0

== Honours ==
Malmö FF

- Allsvenskan: 2014
- Svenska Supercupen: 2014
