= 2008 Svenska Cupen =

Tournament details
- Country: Sweden
- Teams: 98

Final positions
- Champions: IFK Göteborg
- Runners-up: Kalmar FF

Tournament statistics
- Matches played: 96

The 2008 Svenska Cupen was the 53rd season of the main Swedish football Cup. The competition started on March 20, 2008, and concluded on September 21, 2008, with the final, held at Fredriksskans, Kalmar. The final was decided on a penalty shootout that IFK Göteborg won 5–4 against Kalmar FF.

== First round ==
The matches were played between March 20 and April 12, 2008.

Team 1	Score	Team 2
20 March 2008
IK Frej	0–2	Syrianska Botkyrka IF
29 March 2008
Enskede IK	0–2	Valsta Syrianska IK
IFK Luleå	1–0	Skellefteå FF
2 April 2008
Svedala IF	0–1	IFK Malmö
4 April 2008
Gamla Upsala SK	0–1	Gröndals IK
5 April 2008
IK Kongahälla	2–3	Norrby IF
IFK Karlshamn	1–5	Kirseberg IF
Slottsskogen/Godhem IF	2–3	Råslätts SK
6 April 2008
Akropolis IF	w/o^{1}	Väsby United
Mariedals IK	2–3	Fässbergs IF
Västerås SK	5–0	Heby AIF
Täby IS	1–2	Vasalunds IF
Rynninge IK	1–2	Carlstad United BK
IFK Våmhus A	0–3	Sandvikens IF
IFK Fjärås	0–5	Torslanda IK
Lindö FF	0–4	Syrianska FC
Yxnerums IF	0–5	Myresjö IF
Klippans Förenade FF	1–1 (aet); 5–4 (p)	IFK Klagshamn
FK Älmeboda/Linneryd	1–3	IFK Hässleholm
Stafsinge IF	1–4	Ramlösa Södra FF
Tölö IF	0–4	IFK Värnamo
Bäckhammars SK	0–18	Karlslunds IF HFK
Delsbo IF	4–2 (aet)	Sollefteå GIF FF
IFK Berga	0–4	Kristianstads FF
Växjö Norra IF	0–6	Ängelholms FF
Gerdskens BK	0–1	Skärhamns IK
Skultorps IF	0–6	Skövde AIK
Sollentuna Fotboll IF	0–1	FC Gute
IK Östria Lambohov	1–2	Nyköpings BIS
Östansbo IS	0–3	KB Karlskoga
Östersunds FK	2–0	IFK Timrå
Tibro AIK	3–1	IF Hagapojkarna
IFK Holmsund	1–2	Bodens BK
22 April 2008
Eds FF	2–1 (aet)	FC Trollhättan

^{1}Akropolis IF withdrew from the competition.

== Second round ==
In this round entered winners from the previous round as well as all teams from Allsvenskan and Superettan. The matches were played between April 23 and May 1, 2008.

Team 1	Score	Team 2
23 April 2008
Norrby IF	2–1	Bodens BK
29 April 2008
IFK Hässleholm	0–4	Degerfors IF
Tibro AIK	1–0	IF Limhamn Bunkeflo
30 April 2008
FC Gute	3–4	Helsingborgs IF
KB Karlskoga	0–4	GIF Sundsvall
Valsta Syrianska IK	1–0 (aet)	BK Häcken
1 May 2008
Eds FF	1–4	IF Brommapojkarna
Östersunds FK	0–7	Kalmar FF
IFK Värnamo	0–1	Enköpings SK
Kristianstads FF	2–3 (aet)	Malmö FF
Klippans Förenade FF	0–5	Falkenbergs FF
Kirseberg IF	1–4	IK Sirius
Carlstad United BK	3–2	Gefle IF
Delsbo IF	0–2	Landskrona BoIS
Fässbergs IF	0–1	Vasalunds IF
IFK Luleå	1–2	Halmstads BK
Gröndals IK	2–1	Åtvidabergs FF
Myresjö IF	0–1	Örebro SK
Torslanda IK	0–1 (aet)	Mjällby AIF
Väsby United	2–1 (aet)	Östers IF
Ängelholms FF	1–2	IF Elfsborg
Råslätts SK	0–9	Djurgårdens IF
Ramlösa Södra FF	2–4	IFK Norrköping
Syrianska Botkyrka IF	1–2	Jönköpings Södra IF
Skärhamns IK	1–1 (aet); 6–7 (p)	Ljungskile SK
Syrianska FC	4–6 (aet)	Hammarby IF
Karlslunds IF	3–0	IF Sylvia
Västerås SK	2–0	Trelleborgs FF
Nyköpings BIS	1–0	GAIS
Sandvikens IF	0–3	Örgryte IS
IFK Malmö	0–2	AIK
Skövde AIK	1–2	IFK Göteborg

== Third round ==
In this round entered winners from the previous round. The matches were played between May 14 and 18, 2008.

Team 1	Score	Team 2
14 May 2008
Karlslunds IF	1–0	Västerås SK
Vasalunds IF	3–4	IFK Norrköping
15 May 2008
Carlstad United BK	0–2	Malmö FF
Nyköpings BIS	0–9	Halmstads BK
16 May 2008
IF Elfsborg	3–1	Örebro SK
17 May 2008
IK Sirius	4–2	Djurgårdens IF
Valsta Syrianska IK	2–1	Helsingborgs IF
Falkenbergs FF	0–3 (aet)	IFK Göteborg
Hammarby IF	5–1	Mjällby AIF
Väsby United	0–3	Örgryte IS
Norrby IF	0–6	Ljungskile SK
18 May 2008
Gröndals IK	1–3	GIF Sundsvall
Tibro AIK	0–3	Enköpings SK
Degerfors IF	3–1	Jönköpings Södra IF
Kalmar FF	2–0	IF Brommapojkarna
AIK	0–1	Landskrona BoIS

== Fourth round ==
The matches were played on June 25, 26 and 28, 2008.

Team 1	Score	Team 2
25 June 2008
Halmstads BK	2–2 (aet); 2–4 (p)	IF Elfsborg
Landskrona BoIS	0–1	GIF Sundsvall
26 June 2008
Valsta Syrianska IK	1–0	Örgryte IS
28 June 2008
Malmö FF	2–3	Hammarby IF
Kalmar FF	6–1	Degerfors IF
Enköpings SK	4–1	IK Sirius
IFK Göteborg	1–0	Ljungskile SK
Karlslunds IF	0–3	IFK Norrköping

== Quarter-finals ==
10 July 2008	IFK Norrköping	2–2 (a.e.t.) (4–5 p)	Enköpings SK	Norrköping
19:00	Bamberg 29'; Magnusson 110'		Arvhage 67' (o.g.); Eriksson 120'	Stadium: Idrottsparken; Attendance: 677; Referee: Åke Andreasson
	Penalties
	Arvhage (penalty scored); Dybendal (penalty scored); Bamberg (penalty scored); Rönneklev (penalty scored); Magro (penalty missed)		(penalty scored) Sokal; (penalty scored) Mytin; (penalty scored) Eriksson; (penalty scored) Gussev; (penalty scored) Klingberg

10 July 2008	GIF Sundsvall	2–3	IFK Göteborg	Sundsvall
19:00	Saglik 30'; Sigurðsson 62'		Johansson 50'; Hysén 67'; Wernbloom 76'	Stadium: Norrporten Arena; Attendance: 3,457; Referee: Michael Lerjéus

24 July 2008	Valsta Syrianska IK	0–4	Hammarby IF	Märsta
19:00			Paulse 45'; Zengin 48'; Laitinen 65'; Guterstam 79'	Stadium: Midgårdsvallen; Attendance: 3,125; Referee: Martin Ingvarsson

7 August 2008	IF Elfsborg	2–4	Kalmar FF	Elfsborg
18:00	Avdić 21'; Augustsson 38'		V. Elm 9'; Ingelsten 33', 71'; R. Elm 65'	Stadium: Borås Arena; Attendance: 2,610; Referee: Håkan Jonasson

== Semi-finals ==
21 August 2008	Hammarby IF	0–1 (a.e.t.)	Kalmar FF	Stockholm
18:00			Dauda 113'	Stadium: Söderstadion; Attendance: 4,538; Referee: Stefan Johannesson

28 August 2008	Enköpings SK	0–3	IFK Göteborg	Enköping
19:00			Wernbloom 38', 90'; Selakovic 89'	Stadium: Enavallen; Attendance: 1,829; Referee: Tobias Mattsson

== Final ==
21 September 2008
15:00

Kalmar FF	0–0 (a.e.t.)	IFK Göteborg
Penalties
Rydström (penalty scored); Johansson (penalty scored); V. Elm (penalty scored); Sobralense (penalty scored); Lindberg (penalty missed)	4–5	(penalty scored) Alexandersson; (penalty scored) Christensen; (penalty scored) Sigurðsson; (penalty scored) Jónsson; (penalty scored) Wernbloom

Fredriksskans, Kalmar
Attendance: 7,158
Referee: Peter Fröjdfeldt
