= Jonas Persson =

Jonas Persson may refer to:

- Jonas Persson (swimmer) (born 1983), Swedish swimmer
- Jonas Persson (football executive), Swedish businessman
- Jonas Persson (cyclist) (1913–1986), Swedish cyclist
- Jonas Persson (handballer) (born 1969), Swedish handballer
