= Abiola Dauda =

Nigerian association footballer

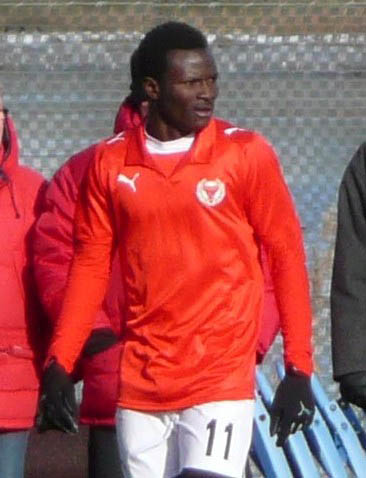
- Dauda training with Kalmar in 2008

Personal information
- Full name: Abiola Adedeji Dauda
- Date of birth: 3 February 1988 (age 38)
- Place of birth: Lagos, Nigeria
- Height: 1.80 m (5 ft 11 in)
- Position: Striker

Team information
- Current team: Aris Petroupolis

Youth career
- 2005–2006: Grassroot Highlanders

Senior career*
Years	Team	Apps	(Gls)
2006–2007	Sölvesborgs GoIF	25	(23)
2008–2012	Kalmar	129	(33)
2013–2014	Red Star Belgrade	31	(15)
2014–2017	Vitesse	28	(9)
2016	→ Hearts (loan)	13	(5)
2017–2018	Atromitos	40	(11)
2018–2019	Giresunspor	25	(11)
2019–2020	AEL	12	(2)
2020	Panetolikos	12	(6)
2020–2022	Apollon Smyrnis	52	(9)
2022–2023	Mohammedan	19	(9)
2023–2024	Ionikos	29	(12)
2024–	Aris Petroupolis	0	(0)
- * Club domestic league appearances and goals as of 26 February 2024

Abiola Adedeji Dauda (born on 3 February 1988) is a Nigerian professional footballer who plays as a forward for Gamma Ethniki club Aris Petroupolis.

== Early life ==
Dauda has vertical scars under each of his eyes which are family markings that were given to him shortly after birth. He has eleven siblings in his family.

== Career ==
=== Early career ===
Dauda was discovered in Nigeria by an agent Victor Mcdonald at age eighteen. He was playing with Grassroot Highlanders. Mcdonald helped him to get signed with Swedish fourth tier club Sölvesborgs GoIF. His time there was very successful and he was named the best forward of the division in 2007 which made several Allsvenskan clubs want to sign him.

=== Kalmar ===
In the end, he decided to join Kalmar FF the following year. During his time there he very rarely got to play the full 90 minutes in games but he still had a prolific 2012 season where he scored a total of 14 goals. After the season had ended he declared that he was leaving the club to look for a new challenge. During his spell with Kalmar, he won the Swedish championship in 2008 and the Swedish Supercup in 2009, besides having been twice runner-up of the Swedish Cup, in 2008 and 2011.

=== Red Star Belgrade ===
On 8 February 2013, which was the last day of the transfer market window in Jelen Super Liga Dauda signed a contract with Red Star Belgrade. The first occasion on which Dauda scored for Red Star came on 3 April 2013, when he scored two goals and provided an assist for teammate Darko Lazović in a 3–0 win at home against Hajduk Kula.

=== Vitesse ===
On 21 July 2014, Red Star Belgrade announced they had agreed a €500,000 fee for the transfer of Dauda to Eredivisie club Vitesse Arnhem.

=== Heart of Midlothian ===
On 1 February 2016, Scottish Premiership side Heart of Midlothian signed him on a loan deal for the remainder of the season. He scored his first goals for the club when he scored a brace in the league against Ross County on 10 February 2016.

=== Atromitos ===
On 9 January 2017, Dauda signed a one-and-a-half-year contract with Super League Greece club Atromitos on a free transfer from Vitesse. His five goals in the 2016–17 Greek Cup made him top scorer for the season.

Dauda scored as Atromitos beat AEK Athens 1–0 to go top of the table on 23 October 2017. His goal on 28 January 2018 secured a 1–0 home win over AEL, and two goals in the last match of the season took his personal total to nine. The 4–0 home win against Kerkyra gave Atromitos a fourth-place finish.

=== Giresunspor ===
Dauda spent the 2018–19 season with TFF First League (Turkish second-tier) club Giresunspor, for which he scored 12 goals from 28 league appearances.

=== AEL ===
Dauda returned to the Greek Super League with AEL on a three-year contract.

=== Panetolikos ===
On 16 January 2020, following his release from AEL, he joined Panetolikos on a six-month contract. In his debut, two days later, he salvaged a point in a home game against Lamia, with a last-minute penalty. On 22 January 2020, Abiola Dauda, who recently moved from Larissa to Panetolikos a few days ago, struck a brace, first in the 28th minute after dribbling past the goalkeeper and slotting the ball into the net, and in the 63rd minute when his left-footed strike gave the visitors a 0–2 lead in a thrilling 2–2 away draw against AEL.

=== Apollon Smyrnis ===
On 4 September 2020, he signed with Apollon Smyrnis on a free transfer.

=== Ionikos ===
On September 2023, he moved to Ionikos on a free transfer.

=== Aris Petroupolis ===
On 27 July 2024, he signed with Aris Petroupolis on a free transfer.

== Career statistics ==
As of 5 April 2023

Appearances and goals by club, season and competition
Club	Season	League			Cup		Continental		Other		Total	
Club	Season	Division	Apps	Goals	Apps	Goals	Apps	Goals	Apps	Goals	Apps	Goals
Sölvesborgs GoIF	2007	Division 2	25	23	—		—		—		25	23
Kalmar	2008	Allsvenskan	20	5	0	0	4 (Note: Appearance(s) in UEFA Europa League)	3	—		24	8
Kalmar	2009	Allsvenskan	28	7	0	0	1 (Note: Appearance(s) in UEFA Champions League)	0	1 (Note: Appearance(s) in Swedish Super Cup)	0	30	7
Kalmar	2010	Allsvenskan	30	5	3 (Note: Appearance(s) in Swedish Cup)	0	4	1	—		36	6
Kalmar	2011	Allsvenskan	26	2	3	2	—		—		29	4
Kalmar	2012	Allsvenskan	25	14	1	1	6	3	—		32	18
Kalmar	Total		129	33	7	3	15	7	1	0	152	43
Red Star Belgrade	2012–13	Serbian SuperLiga	11	4	—		—		—		11	4
Red Star Belgrade	2013–14	Serbian SuperLiga	20	11	3 (Note: Appearance(s) in Serbian Cup)	2	4	0	—		27	13
Red Star Belgrade	Total		31	15	3	2	4	0	0	0	38	17
Vitesse	2014–15	Eredivisie	16	6	2 (Note: Appearance(s) in Dutch Cup)	0	—		—		18	6
Vitesse	2015–16	Eredivisie	11	3	0	0	—		—		11	3
Vitesse	2016–17	Eredivisie	1	0	0	0	—		—		1	0
Vitesse	Total		28	9	2	0	0	0	0	0	30	9
Hearts (loan)	2015–16	Scottish Premiership	13	5	2 (Note: Appearance(s) in Scottish Cup)	0	—		—		15	5
Atromitos	2016–17	Super League Greece	12	2	3 (Note: Appearance(s) in Greek Cup)	5	—		—		15	7
Atromitos	2017–18	Super League Greece	28	9	6	0	—		—		34	9
Atromitos	Total		40	11	9	5	0	0	0	0	49	16
Giresunspor	2018–19	1. Lig	25	11	3 (Note: Appearance(s) in Turkish Cup)	1	—		—		28	12
AEL	2019–20	Super League Greece	12	2	2	0	—		—		14	2
Panetolikos	2019–20	Super League Greece	12	6	1	1	—		—		13	7
Apollon Smyrnis	2020–21	Super League Greece	28	5	1	1	—		—		29	6
Apollon Smyrnis	2021–22	Super League Greece	24	4	1	0	—		—		25	4
Apollon Smyrnis	Total		52	9	2	1	0	0	0	0	54	10
Mohammedan	2022–23	I-League	19	9	1 (Note: Appearance(s) in Super Cup)	2	—		1 (Note: Appearance(s) in Durand Cup)	2	21	13
Career total			392	144	32	15	19	7	2	2	445	168

== Honours ==
Kalmar FF

- Allsvenskan: 2008
- Svenska Supercupen: 2009

Red Star

- Serbian SuperLiga: 2013–14

Vitesse Arnhem

- KNVB Cup: 2016–17

Mohammedan Sporting

- CFL Premier Division A: 2022

Individual

- Greek Cup Top goalscorer: 2016–17
