= Jonas Persson (football executive) =

Swedish businessman and football executive

Chairman of Kalmar FF
- In office February 2018 – March 2020
- Preceded by: Johan Assarsson
- Succeeded by: Anders Henriksson

Personal details
- Education: Lund University
- Profession: Businessman

Jonas Persson is a Swedish businessman who is the former chairman of the Swedish association football club Kalmar FF, a post he held from February 2018 to February 2020. He is the CEO of Commercial Sports Media, a Swedish broadcasting rights company; he also serves on the board of Sportway. Sportway offers video streaming of youth sports events.
