= Mohamed Bangura =

Sierra Leonean footballer

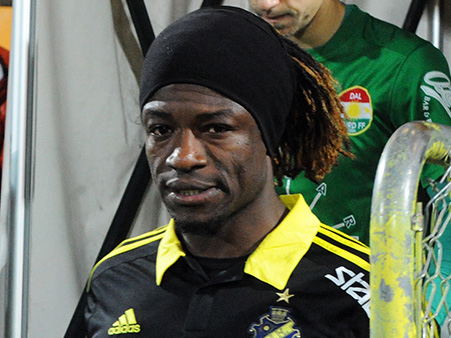
- Bangura during his third spell at AIK.

Personal information
- Date of birth: 27 July 1989 (age 37)
- Place of birth: Kambia, Sierra Leone
- Height: 1.80 m (5 ft 11 in)
- Position: Striker

Youth career
- –2005: FC Kallon

Senior career*
Years	Team	Apps	(Gls)
2005–2010	FC Kallon		
2010	→ IFK Värnamo (loan)	13	(12)
2010–2011	AIK	33	(13)
2011–2014	Celtic	11	(0)
2012	→ AIK (loan)	10	(5)
2013	→ IF Elfsborg (loan)	27	(7)
2014	İstanbul BB	8	(0)
2015	AIK	30	(8)
2016	Dalian Yifang	24	(3)
2017	Dalkurd FF	10	(1)
2018	Akropolis IF	14	(2)

International career^{‡}
2010–2013	Sierra Leone	18	(2)
- * Club domestic league appearances and goals as of 31 March 2019 ‡ National team caps and goals as of 10 September 2013

Mohamed Bangura (born 27 July 1989) is a Sierra Leonean professional footballer.

== Club career ==
=== IFK Värnamo ===
On 19 March 2010, Swedish third tier side IFK Värnamo (coached by the former Sweden midfielder Jonas Thern) announced they had signed Bangura on loan for the forthcoming season. At the Småland club Bangura made an immediate impact; when half of the season was played, Bangura had scored 12 goals in 13 league games, turning Värnamo into one of the division's top sides.

=== AIK ===
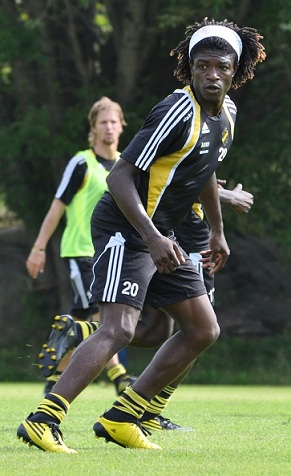
Bangura training in his first spell at AIK.

On 19 July 2010, AIK announced that they had signed Bangura on a 3 1/2-year contract tying him to the club until the end of 2013. It was made clear that AIK was not the only major Swedish side to have shown interest in signing Bangura. Örebro SK, at the time one of the top Allsvenskan teams, were also interested but decided to pass due to Bangura being injured. AIK, on the other hand, had scouted Bangura thoroughly for a long time and wanted to make a quick deal. On 24 July 2010, Bangura made his Allsvenskan debut for AIK against Malmö FF away by coming in as a substitute in the 74th minute. On 28 July, Bangura was in the starting eleven in AIK's next fixture, the UEFA Champions League qualifier at home against Rosenborg BK. The game ended with a 0–1 defeat for AIK but Bangura received much praise for his performance in the game. On 8 August 2010, Bangura scored his first two goals in AIK's 2–1 victory over IF Brommapojkarna. Two months after signing for the club, Egyptian side Al Ahly had a 4 million bid to sign Bangura turned down. At the end of the season, AIK went on to finish in eleventh place and Bangura finished his first half-season at the club with six goals in thirteen appearances.

In the 2011 season, Bangura formed a striking partnership with new signing Teteh Bangura and together, they formed a line of attack in number of games. Then, on 17 April 2011, Bangura scored twice in a match with a 2–2 draw against Elfsborg and when they met again on 31 July 2011, the match proved to be a last partnership with both Banguras, as they moved to a new club. As they formed a partnership, the Banguras scored the combination of twenty-two goals in the league. In the summer transfer window, Bangura attracted interests from clubs around Europe like Russian side Lokomotiv Moscow and Club Brugge.

=== Celtic ===
On 30 August 2011, Bangura signed a four-year deal with Celtic for a fee of around £2.2million. He is the first Sierra Leonean to play for Celtic. He was recommended to Celtic by former striker and fan favourite Henrik Larsson. Bangura made his Celtic debut for Celtic on 10 September. Coming on as a 68th-minute substitute for Anthony Stokes in a 4–0 victory against Motherwell at Celtic Park. Bangura then made his next appearance against Atlético Madrid in the Europa League group stage, coming on as a 75th-minute substitute. His first start for the club came on 29 September in a 1–1 draw with Italian side Udinese. He endured a nightmare start at Celtic after failing to hit a single first-team goal and falling out of favour as manager Neil Lennon preferred strikers Gary Hooper, Anthony Stokes and Georgios Samaras in the first team. It went from bad to worse for Bangura when he suffered a knee injury which kept him out for three months despite the fact he did not require surgery, manager Neil Lennon admitted that Bangura had not responded well to treatment and an operation may be required to cure the problem. After 3 months recuperating, Bangura was once again ruled out for 16 weeks and missed the remainder of the season. Manager Neil Lennon said of the injury: "He had a scan and it revealed he needed surgery. The surgery was a success and he is coming back up today. But he is going to be out for 12–16 weeks. It's unfortunate for him. It was possibly the reason why he hasn't recaptured his form. Maybe it was hampering him a bit." Bangura soon left Celtic and wouldn't be back until December 2012, returning to AIK in the meantime.

Following the conclusion of his subsequent loan spell at Elfsborg, Lennon stated that his frustration and displeasure over Bangura's participation in competitive matches for Elfsborg against Celtic in Champions League qualifying was water under the bridge.

His contract with Celtic was terminated by mutual consent on 31 January 2014.

=== Loan to Swedish Clubs ===
In late August 2012, he once again joined AIK, this time on loan until the end of 2012. After the move, Bangura said returning to the club could hopefully revive his deadly reputation and he believed going back to Sweden would be a good boost for his career.

At the beginning of January 2013, Bangura joined Swedish 2012 champions Elfsborg on a 1-year loan from Celtic, in a new venture for the club's forthcoming Champions League qualification campaign. The estimated cost for Bangura's loan is to be £1 million. At Elfsborg, Bangura started to improve his goalscoring form, unlike his time at AIK, including a brace in a 6–0 win over Brommapojkarna on 23 May 2013.

On 31 July 2013, in a buildup to a match against his parent club in the Third qualifying round of the Champions League, Manager Neil Lennon disapproved of the club letting Bangura playing against them after advising him not to play. In response, Manager Bo Johansson, on the other hand, disagrees with Lennon and described his comments "unacceptable and scandalous" and will let him play in both legs. Joe Ledley made a statement to Bangura, warning him never come back to Celtic if Elfsborg eliminate Celtic from the Champions League and expressed his opinion on Bangura, that "I don't think it would be the best move for him [Bangura]." Eventually, Bangura played the match against his parent club and ended up losing 1–0.

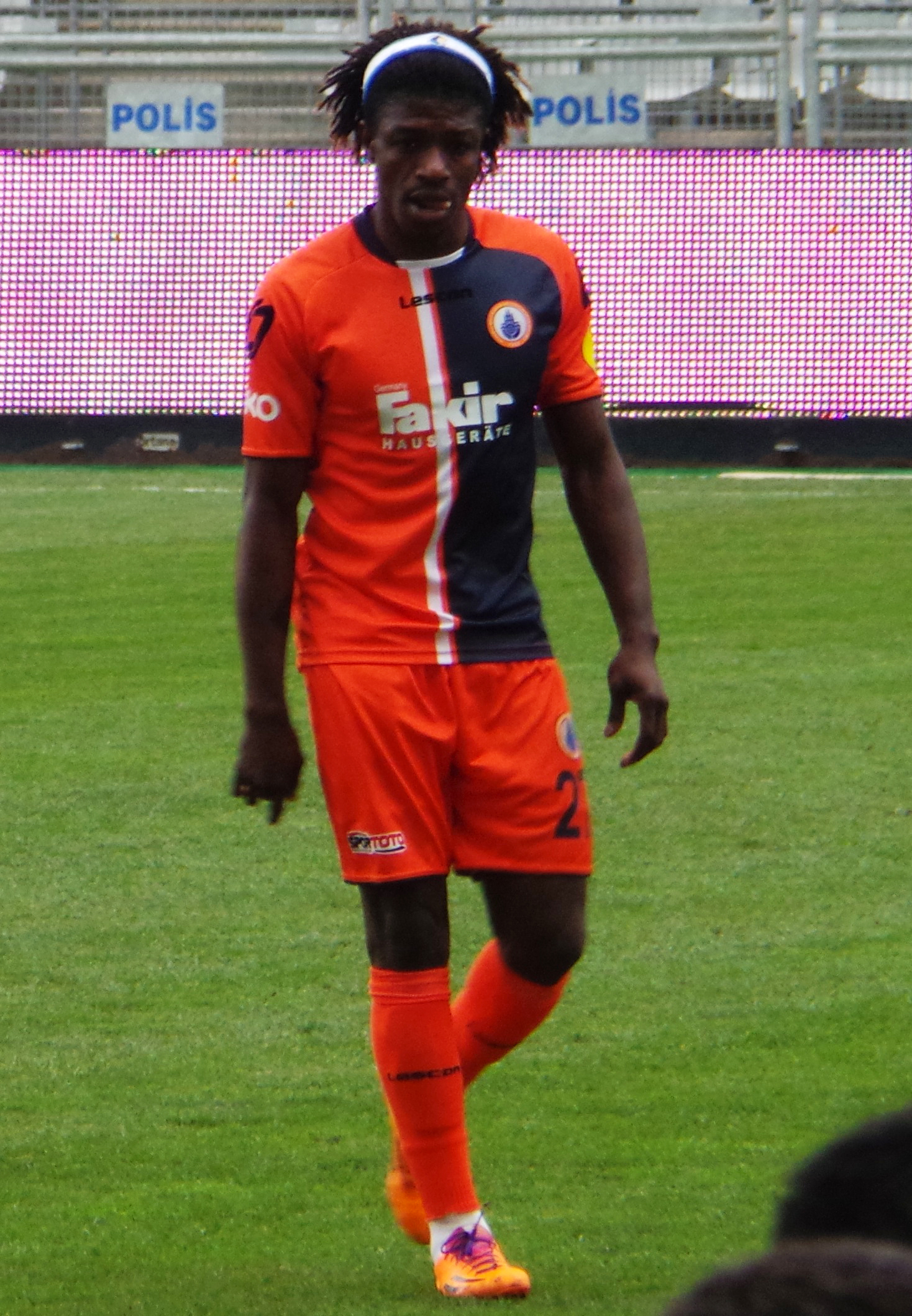
Bangura playing in the Turkish League, March 2014.

=== İstanbul Başakşehir ===
On 3 February 2014, Bangura joined Turkish second-tier league side İstanbul BB on a two-and-a-half-year deal.

=== AIK (third spell) ===
On 5 December 2014, AIK held a press conference to announce the return of Bangura. Having gone through some unsuccessful recent years in his career, Bangura trained with AIK for a while before he signed a two-year deal with an option for a third year.

=== Dalian Yifang ===
On 22 December 2015, Bangura transferred to China League One side Dalian Yifang. The team ended the 3-year contract with him at the end of the season, mostly due to his lack of performance during the season.

=== Dalkurd ===
On 11 January 2017, Bangura joined Dalkurd in Superettan on a one-year deal. He made 10 appearances in the league, scoring once, before leaving at the end of the year following the club's promotion to the top tier. Bangura was not offered a new contract by Dalkurd.

== International ==
Bangura made his international debut on 5 September 2010, in a 2012 Africa Cup of Nations qualification match against Egypt which ended in a 1–1 draw.

== Personal life ==
In the Autumn of 2010, Bangura was to become a father for the first time. However, tragedy struck and the child died during birth.

== Career statistics ==
As of 7 June 2017

Club	League	Season	League		Cup		League Cup		Europe		Total	
Club	League	Season	Apps	Goals	Apps	Goals	Apps	Goals	Apps	Goals	Apps	Goals
AIK	Allsvenskan	2010	12	6	—				4	1	16	7
AIK	Allsvenskan	2011	19	7	1	0	—				19	7
AIK	Allsvenskan	Total	31	13	1	0	—		4	1	35	14
Celtic	SPL	2011–12	10	0	0	0	1	0	4	0	15	0
Celtic	SPL	2012–13	1	0	0	0	0	0	0	0	1	0
Celtic	SPL	Total	11	0	0	0	1	0	4	0	16	0
AIK (loan)	Allsvenskan	2012	10	4	0	0	—		6	1	16	5
AIK (loan)	Allsvenskan	Total	10	4	0	0	—		6	1	16	5
Elfsborg (loan)	Allsvenskan	2013	27	7	0	0	—		8	1	35	8
Elfsborg (loan)	Allsvenskan	Total	27	7	0	0	—		8	1	35	8
İstanbul BB	TFF First League	2013–14	8	0	—						8	0
İstanbul BB	TFF First League	Total	8	0	—						8	0
AIK	Allsvenskan	2015	30	8	3	1	—		5	1	35	8
AIK	Allsvenskan	Total	30	8	3	1	—		5	1	35	8
Dalian Yifang	China League One	2016	24	3	1	1	—				25	4
Dalian Yifang	China League One	Total	24	3	1	1	—				25	4
Dalkurd	Superettan	2017	10	1	3	1	—				13	2
Dalkurd	Superettan	Total	10	1	3	1	—				13	2
Career Total			151	36	8	3	1	0	27	4	187	43

== Honours ==
- Sierra Leone Player of the Year: 2011
