= Malcolm Stolt =

Swedish footballer

Personal information
- Date of birth: 30 December 2000 (age 25)
- Place of birth: Sweden
- Height: 1.88 m (6 ft 2 in)
- Position: Forward

Team information
- Current team: Kalmar FF
- Number: 9

Youth career
- –2019: Örebro SK

Senior career*
Years	Team	Apps	(Gls)
2020	IFK Östersund	12	(10)
2020–2024	Östersunds FK	66	(16)
2024–2025	SKN St. Pölten	12	(3)
2025–	Kalmar FF	21	(6)
- * Club domestic league appearances and goals as of 13 November 2025

Malcolm Stolt (born 30 December 2000) is a Swedish footballer who plays as a forward for Superettan side Kalmar FF.

== Career ==
Stolt began his youth career with Örebro SK but was not offered a senior contract following the 2019 season, leading to his departure from the club. In May 2020, he signed with Division 2 side IFK Östersund, where he made an immediate impact by scoring on his debut in a 3–1 victory against Morön BK on 14 June 2020.

On 3 August 2020, Stolt joined Allsvenskan club Östersunds FK on a contract valid through 2022. However, he remained with IFK Östersund on loan for the remainder of the season, registering 10 goals in 12 appearances. Stolt made his Allsvenskan debut on 1 November 2020 in a match against Mjällby AIF, coming on as a substitute in the 79th minute. In December 2022, he extended his contract with Östersunds FK for an additional two years.

On 21 August 2024, Stolt signed for Austrian 2. Liga club SKN St. Pölten on an initial two-year contract with the option for a further twelve months.

On 25 March 2025, Stolt returned to Sweden, signing a three-year contract with Superettan club Kalmar FF.
