= Anders Henriksson (politician) =

Swedish politician

- Born: 26 September 1961 (age 64); Kalmar, Kalmar, Sweden
- Occupation: Politician
- Political party: Swedish Social Democrats

Anders Uno Henriksson (born 26 September 1961) is a Swedish Social Democratic politician.

Henriksson was born in Kalmar, Kalmar County. He was chairman of Kalmar County Council between October 2006 and October 2018. In October 2019, he was elected to succeed Lena Micko as vice-president of the board for the Swedish Association of Local Authorities and Regions (SKR). He had previously served on the board for SKR. He was also appointed as a member of the United Cities and Local Governments (UCLG) council, and the UCLG Executive Bureau. In addition, he attended the World Urban Forum (WUF) hosted by the United Nations Human Settlements Programme as a European representative.

Henriksson has repeatedly been mentioned as one of the most influential persons in Swedish healthcare. In 2017 he was listed as the most influential person in Swedish healthcare by Dagens Medicin, due to his influence over Social Democrat healthcare policy.

At the annual meeting in March 2020, Henriksson was elected chairman of the board of Kalmar FF, replacing Jonas Persson.
