= Eds FF =

Swedish football club

- Full name: Eds Fotbollförening
- Founded: 1938
- Ground: Bergslätt IP; Ed; Sweden
- Chairman: Hans Åkerlund
- League: Division 4 Bohuslän/Dalsland
Home colours	Away colours

Eds FF is a Swedish football club located in Ed.

== Background ==
Eds FF currently plays in Division 4 Bohuslän/Dalsland which is the sixth tier of Swedish football. They play their home matches at the Bergslätt IP in Ed.

The club is affiliated to Dalslands Fotbollförbund. Eds FF have competed in the Svenska Cupen on 7 occasions and have played 10 matches in the competition. They played in the 2008 Svenska Cupen beating FC Trollhättan by 2–1 (a.e.t.) at home in the first round before losing 1–4 at home to IF Brommapojkarna in the second round with an attendance of 600 spectators.

== Season to season ==
Season	Level	Division	Section	Position	Movements
2006*	Tier 7	Division 5	Dalsland	1st	Promoted
2007	Tier 6	Division 4	Bohuslän/Dalsland	7th	
2008	Tier 6	Division 4	Bohuslän/Dalsland	6th	
2009	Tier 6	Division 4	Bohuslän/Dalsland	2nd	
2010	Tier 6	Division 4	Bohuslän/Dalsland	7th	
2011	Tier 6	Division 4	Bohuslän/Dalsland	7th	

* League restructuring in 2006 resulted in a new division being created at Tier 3 and subsequent divisions dropping a level.
