= István Wampetits =

Hungarian-Swedish footballer and coach (1903–1993)

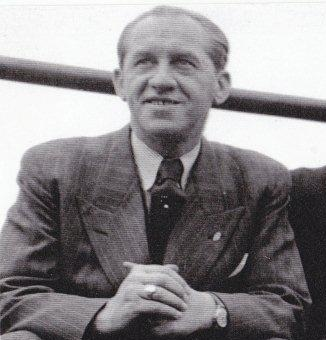
- István Wampetits, late 1930s

Personal information
- Date of birth: 1903
- Place of birth: Austria-Hungary
- Date of death: 1993 (aged 89–90)
- Place of death: Gothenburg, Sweden
- Position: Midfielder

Senior career*
Years	Team	Apps	(Gls)
–	Bocskai FC		

Managerial career
- 1921–1925: Debreceni VSC
- 1936–1937: Debreceni VSC
- 1937–1944: Degerfors IF
- 1945: Malmö FF
- 1944–1948: AIK
- 1949–1950: Örgryte IS
- 1951–1955: Kalmar FF
- 1956–1958: Kalmar FF
- 1959: Halmstads BK
- 1961–62: HIFK
- * Club domestic league appearances and goals

István Wampetits, also spelled as István Vampetich (1903–1993) was a Hungarian-Swedish football player and coach.

Wampetits coached Debreceni VSC, Degerfors IF, Malmö FF, Kalmar FF, AIK, Halmstads BK, Örgryte IS and HIFK.
