= Jacob Ericsson =

Swedish footballer

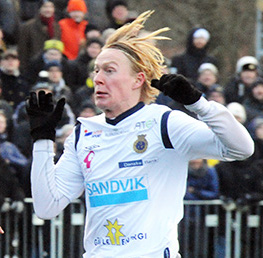

Personal information
- Full name: Jacob Sigfrid Ericsson
- Date of birth: 17 September 1993 (age 33)
- Place of birth: Sweden
- Height: 1.80 m (5 ft 11 in)
- Positions: Defender; midfielder

Team information
- Current team: IF Karlstad

Youth career
- 2000–2006: Sommarro IF
- 2007: Skattkärrs IF
- 2008–2009: Carlstad United
- 2010–2011: AIK

Senior career*
Years	Team	Apps	(Gls)
2009	Carlstad United	2	(0)
2010	Råsunda IS	16	(0)
2010	FC Väsby United	0	(0)
2011–2012	AIK	0	(0)
2011	→ FC Väsby United (loan)	20	(2)
2012	→ Karlstad BK (loan)	26	(2)
2013–2014	Örgryte IS	52	(2)
2015–2016	Gefle IF	40	(0)
2017–2018	Örgryte IS	58	(2)
2019–2020	Falkenbergs FF	55	(0)
2021–	IF Karlstad	2	

International career
2008–2009	Sweden U17	10	(0)
2010	Sweden U19	2	(1)
- * Club domestic league appearances and goals as of 4 April 2019

Jacob Ericsson (born 17 September 1993) is a Swedish footballer who plays for IF Karlstad as a defender.
