= Olle Eriksson (footballer, born 1918) =

Swedish football manager (1918–2006)

Personal information
- Full name: Olof Johan Adolf Eriksson
- Date of birth: 18 December 1918
- Place of birth: Torp, Medelpad, Sweden
- Date of death: 4 January 2006 (aged 87)
- Place of death: Halmstad, Sweden

Senior career*
Years	Team	Apps	(Gls)
- Ala IF
- Ljusne AIK
- IFK Eskilstuna

Managerial career
- 1948–1951: Kalmar AIK
- 1951–1953: Halmstads BK
- 1953–1955: Kalmar AIK
- 1955–1958: Halmstads BK
- 1959: IS Halmia
- 1960: Jönköpings Södra
- 1961–1962: Husqvarna IF
- * Club domestic league appearances and goals

Olle Eriksson (18 December 1918 – 4 January 2006) was a Swedish footballer and foremost known as manager.

Ericsson discovered Nils Liedholm and trained Björn Nordqvist and Freddie Ljungberg.
