= Teteh Bangura =

Sierra Leonean footballer

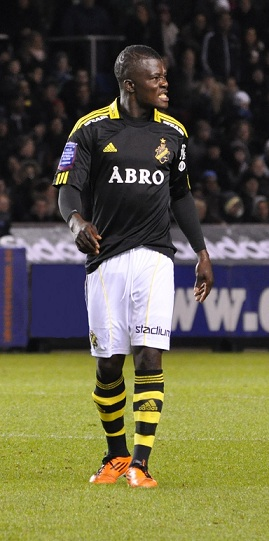

Personal information
- Full name: Ibrahim 'Teteh' Bangura
- Date of birth: 27 December 1989 (age 36)
- Place of birth: Freetown, Sierra Leone
- Height: 6 ft 0 in (1.83 m)
- Position: Striker

Team information
- Current team: Sinopspor
- Number: 19

Senior career*
Years	Team	Apps	(Gls)
2006–2008	Kallon	30	(14)
2009	Cleveland City Stars	9	(2)
2009	→ Cascade Surge (loan)	3	(5)
2010	Kallon	7	(5)
2010	Köping FF	9	(12)
2011	AIK	17	(15)
2011–2014	Bursaspor	34	(6)
2012–2013	→ Şanlıurfaspor (loan)	8	(3)
2013–2014	→ Beitar Jerusalem (loan)	7	(3)
2014	→ AIK (loan)	0	(0)
2015	Mjällby AIF	6	(2)
2016	GAIS	3	(0)
2017	Sinopspor		

International career
2011–2014	Sierra Leone	11	(4)
- * Club domestic league appearances and goals as of 9 June 2016

Ibrahim "Teteh" Bangura (born 27 December 1989 in Freetown) is an unattached Sierra Leonean football striker.

== Career ==
=== Kallon F.C. ===
Bangura began his career in his native Sierra Leone, playing with F.C. Kallon. He was the leading goal scorer in the Sierra Leone National Premier League and Sierra Leone FA Cup for the 2006–07 season, and participated in European trials A.C. Milan and Swedish club BK Häcken, but was not offered a contract by either team.

=== Cleveland City Stars ===
Bangura joined the Cleveland City Stars of the USL First Division in 2009, and was then sent on loan to Cascade Surge of the USL Premier Development League. He scored a hat-trick on his debut for Cascade on 22 May 2009, in a game against Spokane Spiders.

=== Köping FF ===
On 18 July 2010, the Swedish club Köping FF – a fourth tier club struggling against relegation – announced that Bangura was on trial with them. The trial was successful and he made his debut away against Eskilstuna City FK. He scored one goal in that game. His home debut was against the league leaders IK Frej, a 3–3 tie in which Bangura scoring all three goals for the home team.

=== AIK ===
On 27 September AIK signed Bangura for three years starting, 1 January 2011. In the 2011 season, he scored 15 goals in 17 games and made 3 assists. In summer 2011, he signed for Bursaspor.

=== Beitar Jerusalem ===
On 31 August 2013 Bangura entered for the 1st time into a game vs. Maccabi Petah Tikva, as a substitute, and helped the club to win its first win in 2013–14 season. on 29 September 2013 he scored his 1st goal, and alter was shown a red card by the referee in a game vs. Hapoel Ra'anana that ended in 2–2 draw. On 2 November 2013, Bangura scored 2 goals in a game vs. Bnei Yehuda Tel Aviv when Beitar Jerusalem won 2–1. Later Bangura suffered and Injury. He left Beitar Jerusalem in January 2014.

== Career statistics ==
As of 16 October 2017.

Club performance			League		Cup		Continental		Total	
Season	Club	League	Apps	Goals	Apps	Goals	Apps	Goals	Apps	Goals
United States			League		US Open Cup		Champions League		Total	
2009	Cleveland City Stars	USL First Division	9	2	0	0	—		9	2
Sweden			League		Svenska Cupen		Europa League		Total	
2010	Köping	Division 2 Norra Svealand	9	12	0	0	—		9	12
2011	AIK	Allsvenskan	17	15	1	0	—		18	15
2014	AIK (loan)	Allsvenskan	0	0	0	0	0	0	0	0
2015	Mjällby	Superettan	6	2	1	0	—		7	2
2016	GAIS	Superettan	3	0	0	0	—		3	0
Turkey			League		Türkiye Kupası		Europa League		Total	
2011–12	Bursaspor	Süper Lig	24	6	2	0	2	0	28	6
2012–13	Bursaspor	Süper Lig	10	0	1	0	1	0	12	0
2012–13	Sanliurfaspor (loan)	PTT 1. Lig	8	3	0	0	–		8	3
2017–18	Sinopspor	3. Lig			3	2	–		3	2
Israel			League		State Cup		Europa League		Total	
2013–14	Beitar Jerusalem (loan)	Ligat Winner	7	3	0	0	–		7	3
United States Total			9	2	0	0	0	0	9	2
Sweden Total			35	29	2	0	0	0	37	29
Turkey Total			42	9	6	2	3	0	51	11
Israel Total			7	3	0	0	0	0	7	3
Career Total			93	43	8	2	3	0	104	47

== International ==
Bangura was called up to the Sierra Leone national team for a World Cup qualifier with Equatorial Guinea on 6 September 2008, but did not see any minutes.

=== International goals ===
Scores and results list Sierra Leone's goal tally first.

No.	Date	Venue	Opponent	Score	Result	Competition
1.	4 June 2011	National Stadium, Freetown, Sierra Leone	Niger	1–0	1–0	2012 Africa Cup of Nations qualification
2.	9 June 2012	Estadio de Malabo, Malabo, Equatorial Guinea	Equatorial Guinea	2–1	2–2	2014 FIFA World Cup qualification
3.	16 June 2012	National Stadium, Freetown, Sierra Leone	São Tomé and Príncipe	2–1	4–2	2013 Africa Cup of Nations
4.	16 June 2012	National Stadium, Freetown, Sierra Leone	São Tomé and Príncipe	4–1	4–2	2013 Africa Cup of Nations
