= Niklas Klingberg (footballer) =

Swedish footballer and coach

Personal information
- Date of birth: 13 April 1985 (age 41)
- Place of birth: Sweden
- Height: 1.58 m (5 ft 2 in)
- Position: Defender

Team information
- Current team: Alingsås IF (playing manager)

Youth career
- Skyllbergs IK

Senior career*
Years	Team	Apps	(Gls)
2003–2005	Örebro SK	25	(0)
2007–2009	Enköpings SK	33	(7)
2010–2014	Degerfors IF	98	(12)
2015–2017	Örgryte IS	36	(6)
2017	Torslanda IK		
2018–?	Alingsås IF		

Managerial career
- 2018–: Alingsås IF (playing manager)
- * Club domestic league appearances and goals as of 18 December 2017

Niklas Klingberg (born 13 April 1985) is a Swedish footballer who plays for and coaches Alingsås IF as a defender.
