= Köping FF =

Swedish football club

- Full name: Köping Fotbollsförening
- Founded: 1990; 35 years ago
- Ground: Köpings IP; Köping, Sweden
- Capacity: 1,800
- League: Division 3 Västra Svealand
- 2016: Division 3 Västra Svealand, 8th
Home colours	Away colours

Köping FF is a Swedish football club located in Köping in Västmanland County. The senior team split off and formed a new club in 2014 which became known as MD FF Köping, the MD for sponsorship reasons. In 2016 the two clubs agreed to merge yet again and now both the senior team and the youth section are part of Köping FF.

== Background ==
Since their foundation in 1990 Köping FF has participated mainly in the middle and lower divisions of the Swedish football league system. The club currently plays in Division 3 Västra Svealand which is the fifth tier of Swedish football. In 2010 they finished in eleventh position, just two points from safety, and got relegated back to Division 3 for the 2011 season. They play their home matches at the Köpings IP in Köping.

Köping FF are affiliated to the Västmanlands Fotbollförbund.

== Season to season ==
Season	Level	Division	Section	Position	Movements
1993	Tier 4	Division 3	Västra Svealand	2nd	Promotion Playoffs
1994	Tier 4	Division 3	Västra Svealand	6th	
1995	Tier 4	Division 3	Västra Svealand	10th	Relegated
1996	Tier 5	Division 4	Västmanland	2nd	Promotion Playoffs – Promoted
1997	Tier 4	Division 3	Västra Svealand	2nd	Promotion Playoffs
1998	Tier 4	Division 3	Västra Svealand	5th	
1999	Tier 4	Division 3	Västra Svealand	6th	
2000	Tier 4	Division 3	Västra Svealand	11th	Relegated
2001	Tier 5	Division 4	Västmanland	4th	
2002	Tier 5	Division 4	Västmanland	5th	
2003	Tier 5	Division 4	Västmanland	1st	Promoted
2004	Tier 4	Division 3	Västra Svealand	4th	
2005	Tier 4	Division 3	Västra Svealand	4th	Promotion Playoffs
2006*	Tier 5	Division 3	Västra Svealand	3rd	
2007	Tier 5	Division 3	Västra Svealand	3rd	
2008	Tier 5	Division 3	Västra Svealand	1st	Promoted
2009	Tier 4	Division 2	Södra Svealand	8th	
2010	Tier 4	Division 2	Norra Svealand	11th	Relegated

* League restructuring in 2006 resulted in a new division being created at Tier 3 and subsequent divisions dropping a level.

== Attendances ==
In recent seasons Köping FF have had the following average attendances:

Season	Average attendance	Division / Section	Level
2005	381	Div 3 Västra Svealand	Tier 4
2006	225	Div 3 Västra Svealand	Tier 5
2007	313	Div 3 Västra Svealand	Tier 5
2008	354	Div 3 Västra Svealand	Tier 5
2009	350	Div 2 Södra Svealand	Tier 4
2010	242	Div 2 Norra Svealand	Tier 4

* Attendances are provided in the Publikliga sections of the Svenska Fotbollförbundet website.
