= Erkan Sağlık =

Swedish-born Turkish footballer

Personal information
- Full name: Erkan Sağlık
- Date of birth: 19 August 1985 (age 41)
- Place of birth: Kiruna, Sweden
- Height: 1.88 m (6 ft 2 in)
- Position: Defender

Youth career
- Västra Frölunda IF

Senior career*
Years	Team	Apps	(Gls)
2002–2005	Västra Frölunda IF	45	(3)
2005–2006	IFK Göteborg	1	(0)
2006–2010	GIF Sundsvall	76	(6)
2010	Kocaelispor	7	(0)
2010–2011	Nybergsund IL-Trysil	10	(0)
2011–2012	Syrianska FC	17	(1)
2012	Emirates Club		
2012–2013	Al-Salmiya		
2013–2014	Varbergs BoIS FC	27	(2)
2015–2016	Västra Frölunda IF		

International career
2003	Sweden U19	4	(1)
2005	Turkey U21	2	(0)
- * Club domestic league appearances and goals

Erkan Sağlık (born 19 August 1985) is a Swedish-born Turkish former footballer who played as a defender.
