= Petter Wastå =

Swedish footballer

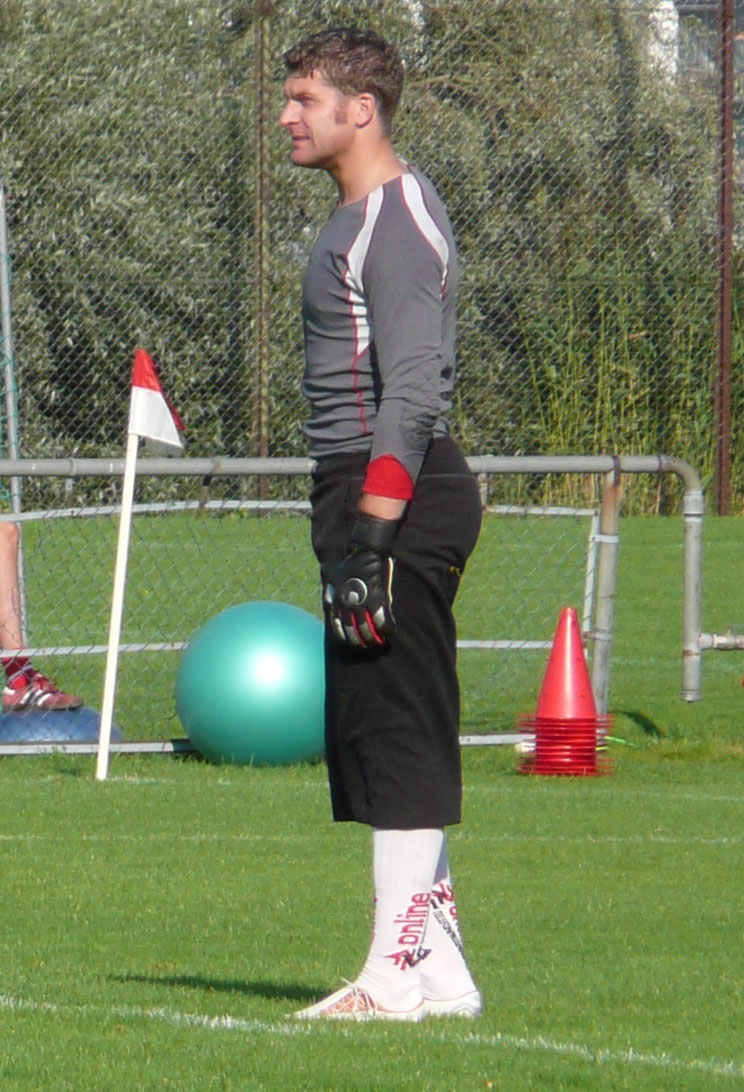

Personal information
- Full name: Jon Petter Wastå
- Date of birth: 2 February 1976 (age 50)
- Place of birth: Alvesta, Sweden
- Height: 1.86 m (6 ft 1 in)
- Position: Goalkeeper

Youth career
- Torsås GoIF
- 1993: Östers IF

Senior career*
Years	Team	Apps	(Gls)
1994–2012	Kalmar FF	409	(0)

International career
1996	Sweden U21	1	(0)
- * Club domestic league appearances and goals

Jon Petter Wastå (born 2 February 1976) is a Swedish former footballer who spent his whole playing career at Kalmar FF, as a goalkeeper.

== Honours ==
- Kalmar FF
  - Allsvenskan: 2008
  - Svenska Cupen: 2007
  - Svenska Supercupen: 2009
