= Emin Nouri =

Azerbaijani footballer (born 1985)

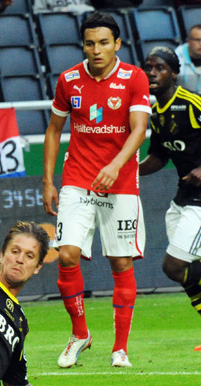

Personal information
- Date of birth: 22 July 1985 (age 41)
- Place of birth: Kardzhali, Bulgaria
- Height: 1.81 m (5 ft 11 in)
- Position: Defender

Team information
- Current team: Kalmar FF (assistant)

Youth career
- Växjö Norra IF
- 1996–2003: Östers IF

Senior career*
Years	Team	Apps	(Gls)
2004–2008	Östers IF	82	(2)
2008–2021	Kalmar FF	257	(2)

International career
2006	Sweden U21	2	(0)
2014	Azerbaijan	1	(0)

Managerial career
- 2021–2022: Kalmar FF U-19 (assistant)
- 2022: Oskarshamns AIK
- 2023–: Kalmar FF (assistant)
- * Club domestic league appearances and goals

Emin Nouri (Bulgarian: Емин Нури, Turkish: Emin Nuri; born 22 July 1985) is a former professional footballer. He was born in Bulgaria and represented Sweden as a youth. He then represented Azerbaijan at senior level.

== Playing career ==
Nouri was born in Kardzhali, Bulgaria from a Turkish family. He joined Östers IF 1996 from local side Växjö Norra. Nouri has also played for the Swedish national U-21 team.

In 2014, he was called up to the Azerbaijan national football team by manager Berti Vogts for a match against Uzbekistan.

== Coaching career ==
On 20 December 2020, Kalmar FF announced that Nouri had extended his contract and would, alongside his playing duties during the 2021 season, also serve as assistant coach for the club's U-19 team under head coach Festim Pasho. In June 2021, Nouri was "loaned out" to partner club Oskarshamns AIK, where he took over as head coach for the remainder of the season.

Upon returning to Kalmar in 2023, Nouri was appointed assistant coach of the club's Allsvenskan team under head coach Henrik Jensen.
