= Stefan Larsson (footballer) =

Swedish footballer

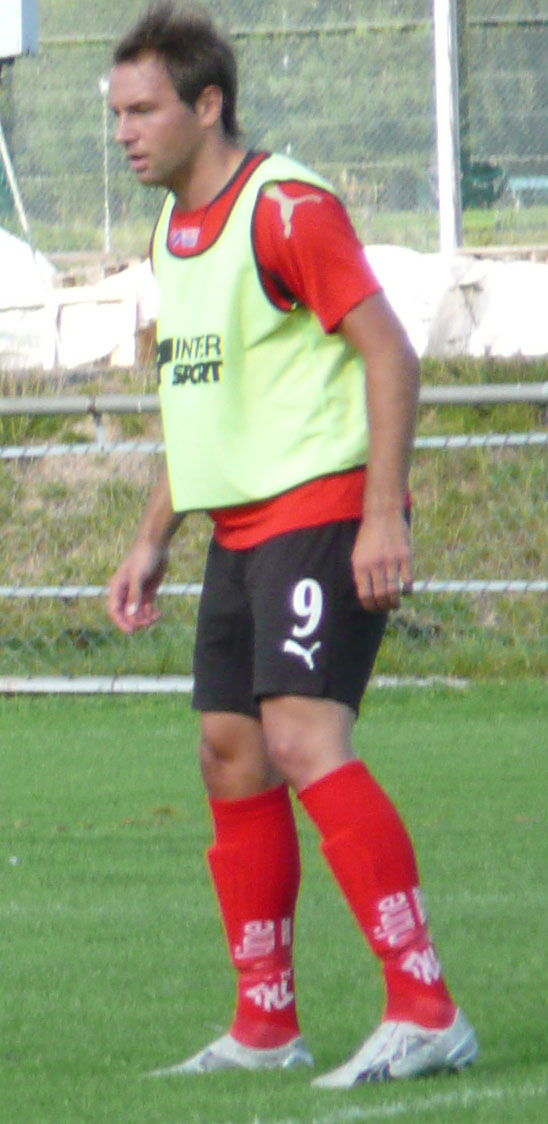

Personal information
- Date of birth: 21 January 1983 (age 43)
- Place of birth: Storfors, Sweden
- Height: 1.83 m (6 ft 0 in)
- Position: Left back

Youth career
- Storfors
- Degerfors

Senior career*
Years	Team	Apps	(Gls)
2000–2006	Degerfors	133	(1)
2007–2011	Kalmar	130	(5)
2012–2013	Elfsborg	20	(0)
2014–2017	Kalmar	53	(0)

Managerial career
- 2024–: Kalmar (caretaker)
- * Club domestic league appearances and goals

Stefan Larsson (born 21 January 1983) is a Swedish retired footballer.

He normally played as a fullback, but was also used in a forward role.

He came on a free transfer to IF Elfsborg where he is planned to play as a left defender. Taking over the position from the retired footballer Johan Karlsson. Larssons biggest qualities are his quickness and passing skills. He played for several matches as a winger in Kalmar FF with success. Season 2007/08 he scored his first goals in the Swedish Allsvenskan as a winger against Örebro SK. He scored two goals that match, both 1-0 and 3–0. The experience from his more offensive role made a great difference when he later played on the left back position as an offensive player.

== Career ==
He started his career in Storfors FF and was picked up by the Swedish Superettan team Degerfors IF. After two good seasons played in Superettan he was bought by the Swedish first league team Kalmar FF, where he achieved his greatest success in his career by winning the Swedish cup 2007 and the following season the national championship title 2008, he also won the supercup 2009. He played the Europa League qualifications with Kalmar FF season 2007/08 and 2010/11. The season 2009/2010 he played the Uefa Champions League qualifications with Kalmar FF, but lost in the first round against Debreceni VSC. He played 130 caps and scored 5 goals during his four years in Kalmar FF, he left the season 2010/11 for the fellow Swedish top team IF Elfsborg who had been top 4 for over six consecutive seasons in the first league and played for several years in the Europa League. He is now led by the former Swedish U-21 national and Stabaek coach Jörgen Lennartsson who recently replaced Magnus Haglund in IF Elfsborg.

== Titles ==
- Allsvenskan champion: 2008, 2012
- Svenska Cupen 2007
- Supercupen 2009

== Europa League Q ==
- 2007/08(Kalmar FF)
- 2010/11(Kalmar FF)
- 2012/13(IF Elfsborg)

== Uefa Champions League Q ==
- 2009/10
- 2013/14
