= Joachim Lantz =

Swedish footballer

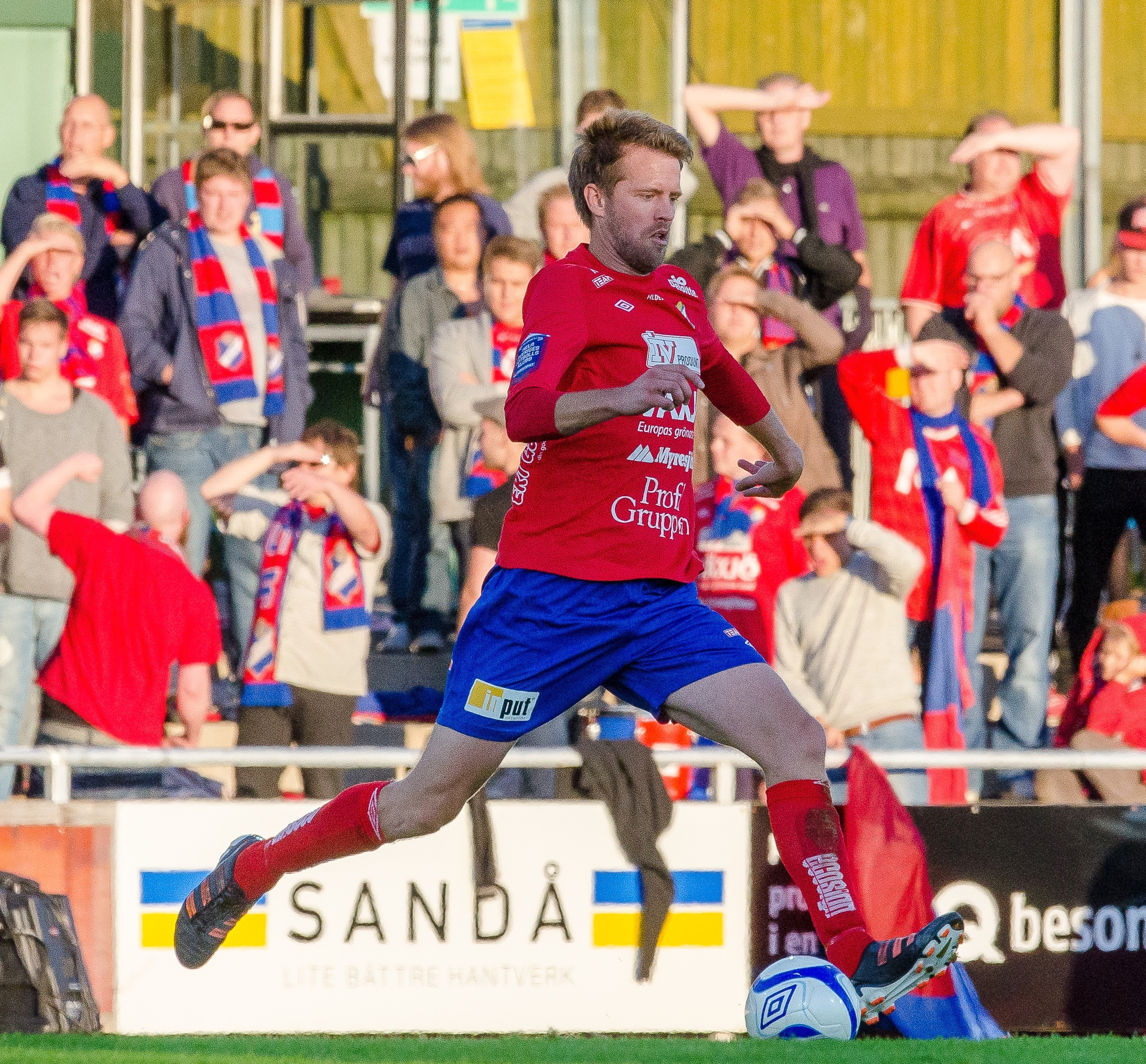

Personal information
- Full name: Joachim Gustav Henric Lantz
- Date of birth: 10 May 1977 (age 49)
- Place of birth: Kalmar, Sweden
- Height: 1.95 m (6 ft 5 in)
- Position: Defender

Youth career
- Kalmar FF

Senior career*
Years	Team	Apps	(Gls)
1996–1997	Kalmar FF	4	(0)
1998–1999	IFK Västerås	43	(0)
2000–2010	Kalmar FF	229	(6)
2011	Mjällby AIF	12	(0)
2012–2013	IFK Berga	13	(0)
2012	→ Östers IF (loan)	9	(0)
- * Club domestic league appearances and goals

Joachim Gustav Henric Lantz (born 10 May 1977) is a Swedish former footballer who played as a defender.
