= Henrik Rydström =

Swedish footballer and manager

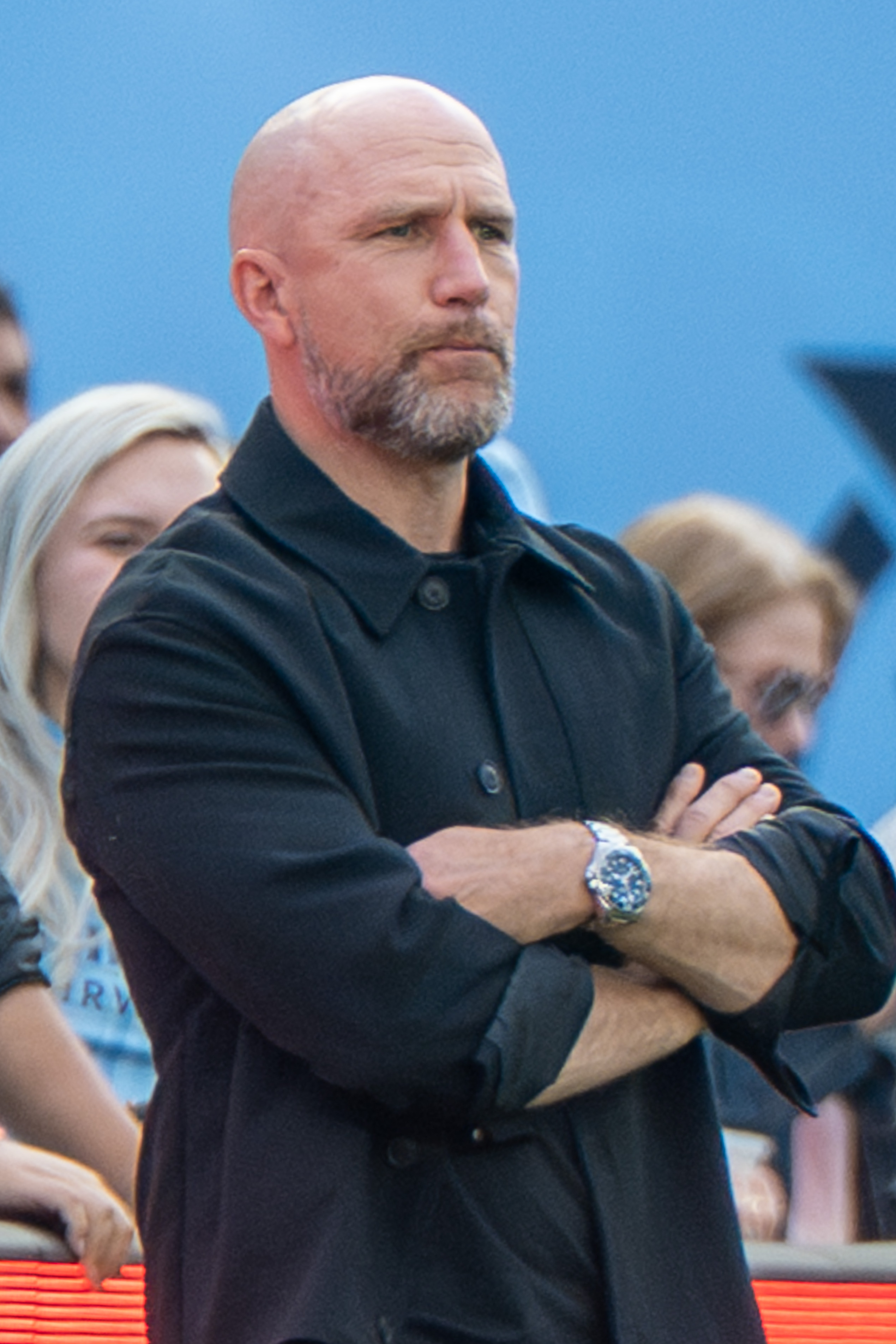
- Rydström in 2026

Personal information
- Full name: Henrik Per-Erik Rydström
- Date of birth: 16 February 1976 (age 50)
- Place of birth: Karlskrona, Sweden
- Height: 1.77 m (5 ft 10 in)
- Position: Midfielder

Team information
- Current team: Hammarby IF (head coach)

Youth career
- 1982–1993: Listerby IK
- 1993–1995: Kalmar FF

Senior career*
Years	Team	Apps	(Gls)
1993–2013	Kalmar FF	551	(23)
2014	IFK Berga	0	(0)
2014–2016	Listerby IK	5	(1)
2016	Hossmo BK	1	(0)
Total		557	(24)

Managerial career
- 2018: Kalmar FF (caretaker)
- 2019–2020: IK Sirius
- 2021–2022: Kalmar FF
- 2023–2025: Malmö FF
- 2026: Columbus Crew
- 2026–: Hammarby IF
- * Club domestic league appearances and goals

Henrik Per-Erik Rydström (born 16 February 1976) is a Swedish professional football manager and former player who is the head coach of Allsvenskan club Hammarby IF.

As of 2013, he was the sixth longest serving player in the world when it comes to playing for the same club.

== Career ==
He made his debut for Kalmar FF in 1994 and played his last game for the team in 2013. He was a defensive midfielder known for a good passing foot and superb leadership on and off the pitch. In the spring of 2008, he was named best club captain of Allsvenskan in a vote from the players of the league. Rydström holds the club record for most games played for Kalmar FF with 802 games.

== Politics ==
He has held speeches for the Swedish Social Democratic Party. He stated in a podcast interview with local newspaper Sydsvenskan, owned by Bonnier Group, while he was the manager of Malmö, that he wants to "take the fight harder against the Sweden Democrats". This statement stirred reactions from the Sweden Democrats in Malmö, who accused him of "bullying and excluding their voter base from welcome to Eleda Stadion". His statement furthermore marked a change in Malmö's neutral stance of outwards politics both regionally and nationally as a democratically membership owned football association, as the press officer of Malmö attended the interview.

== Managerial statistics ==
As of 6 November 2026

Managerial record by team and tenure
Team	Nat	From	To	Record							
Team	Nat	From	To	G	W	D	L	GF	GA	GD	Win %
Kalmar FF	(Sweden)	31 July 2018	31 December 2018	16	3	5	8	12	22	−10	18.75
IK Sirius	(Sweden)	1 January 2019	31 December 2020	68	20	18	30	93	115	−22	29.41
Kalmar FF	(Sweden)	1 January 2021	30 November 2022	69	34	14	21	96	76	+20	49.28
Malmö	(Sweden)	1 December 2022	26 September 2025	126	67	30	29	250	142	+108	53.17
Columbus Crew	(United States)	31 December 2025	17 May 2026	16	5	4	7	26	24	+2	31.25
Hammarby IF	(Sweden)	5 June 2026	Present	22	14	4	4	41	15	+26	63.64
Career total				317	143	75	99	518	394	+124	45.11

== Honours ==
=== Player ===
Kalmar FF

- Allsvenskan: 2008
- Svenska Cupen: 2007
- Svenska Supercupen: 2009

=== Manager ===
Malmö FF

- Allsvenskan: 2023, 2024
- Svenska Cupen: 2023–24
