= Kalmar FF =

Swedish football club

Kalmar
- Full name: Kalmar Fotbollförening
- Nickname: Röda Bröder (Red Brothers)
- Short name: KFF
- Founded: 15 June 1910; 116 years ago (as IF Göta)
- Ground: Guldfågeln Arena, Kalmar
- Capacity: 12,000
- Chairman: Anders Henriksson
- Head coach: Toni Koskela
- League: Allsvenskan
- 2025: Superettan, 2nd of 16 (promoted)
- Website: www.kalmarff.se
| Home colours | Away colours | Third colours |

Kalmar Fotbollförening, more commonly known as Kalmar FF or simply Kalmar, is a Swedish professional football club based in Kalmar, Sweden. The club is affiliated to Smålands Fotbollförbund and play their home games at Guldfågeln Arena. Formed on 15 June 1910, the club have won one national championship title (2008) and three national cup titles (1981, 1987, and 2007).

In total, KFF has made 35 seasons in Allsvenskan since the debut in the 1949. The club can be found at the 13th position in the all-time Allsvenskan standings, is one of 14 Swedish football clubs that have become both national champions and national cup champions, and one of 14 clubs that have always played in one of the three highest Swedish national football leagues.

Kalmar FF's main local rivals are Östers IF and during the 1980s and 90s Kalmar AIK.

== History ==
=== Early years ===
On 15 June 1910, the club IF Göta was created, however they were not allowed to enter the Riksidrottsförbundet due to a conflict regarding the name. The name was already taken by Stockholm's-Göta and Karlstads-Göta. Later in 1912 the club changed its name to IF Gothia and was then accepted by Riksidrottsförbundet.

In 1918 Fredriksskans was opened and at the same time there was a major conference in Kalmar about the high number of clubs in the town, this led to the merging of IF Gothia and Kamraterna to Kalmar Idrotts Sällskap and Kalmar IK merged with Falken to form Kalmar AIK. In 1927 Kalmar Idrotts Sällskap changed its name to Kalmar FF.

In 1927–1928 they qualified for the local league in the Swedish league system, IFK Oskarshamn won the league and was moved up to the Southswedish league, covering both Småland and Skåne, however IFK Oskarshamn renounced its position and it was given to Kalmar FF, this gave rise to complaint from the clubs in Skåne since there were no good train connections to Kalmar at that time, however SJ solved it. In their first game they defeated Malmö FF with 6–0.

=== The middle years ===
In 1949 the club reached Allsvenskan for the first time after defeating Halmstads BK in the decisive game of the season; during this time Swedish leagues were played autumn–spring, on 31 July they played their first game in Allsvenskan against Degerfors IF and lost 2–0, afterward, the later world-famous Gunnar Nordahl claimed that he had seen much worse newcomers, also this year, on 4 September Kalmar faced Malmö FF in front of 15 093 people in the audience; this is still the audience record on Fredriksskans.

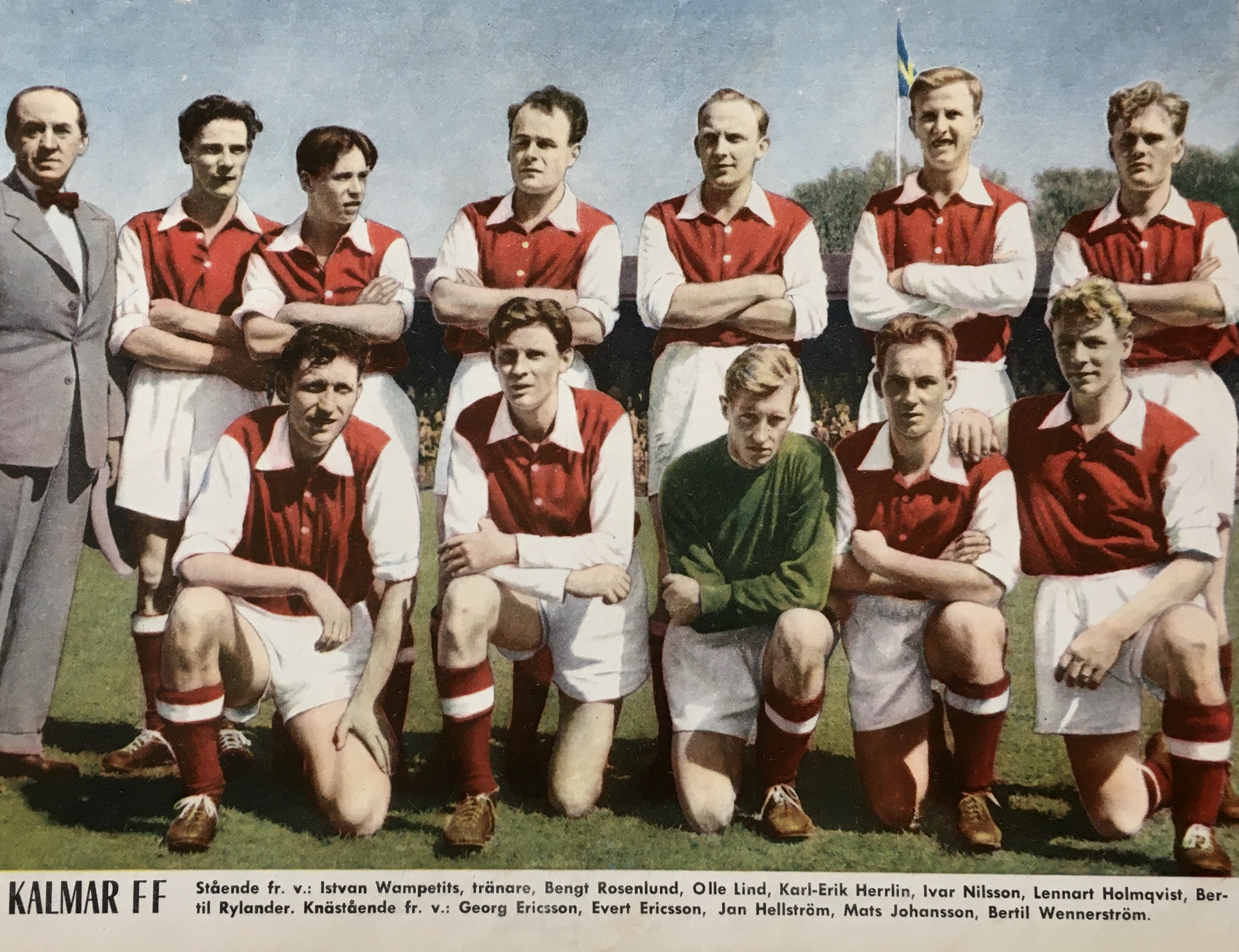
The Kalmar FF team of 1954.

Between 1950 and 1955 the club went up and down between Allsvenskan and Division 2. In 1955 they fell down to Division 2 and stayed there for 20 years; during this time players like Hungarian Ference Marko represented the club at the same time as he lived at the refugee camp in Borgholm in 1957, in 1959 Sune "Mona-Lisa" Andersson, who won an Olympic medal in the 1948 Summer Olympics as a player, as manager, during this time Sten-Åke Johansson played for the club and became the top goalscorer for all time for the club, on 19 October 1975 Kalmar FF defeated Västra Frölunda and returned to Allsvenskan.

In 1976 the club played its 100th game in Allsvenskan against GIF Sundsvall, however this ended with 9–2 defeat and led to manager Kay Wiestål being fired. The 1977 season became the club's most successful season so far; a group of companies sponsored the club's buying of Benno Magnusson; the club was able to end in 3rd place at the end of the season, earning the club its first medal.

In 1981 the club won its first title ever, by defeating IF Elfsborg with 4–0, the club won the Svenska Cupen for the first time ever, however they failed to stay in Allsvenskan and was relegated to Division 1; however the spell was only one year long and Kalmar returned in 1983.

1985 became the club's most successful season, as the club ended up in second place behind Örgryte IS and Billy Lansdowne and Peter Karlsson both became the league's top goalscorer along with Sören Börjesson, Örgryte IS, all scoring 10 goals each. The following year did not go as good; the club was relegated from the top league and the only happiness in 1987 was when the club yet again won the Cup title, this time against GAIS, however the club fell out of Division 1 this year.

In 1988 Kalmar FF won Division 2 without a single defeat which is a record in Division 2 and higher leagues. Between 1989 and 1997 the club spent most of its time in second highest league; this caused serious economic problems for the club.

=== The Brazilian era ===
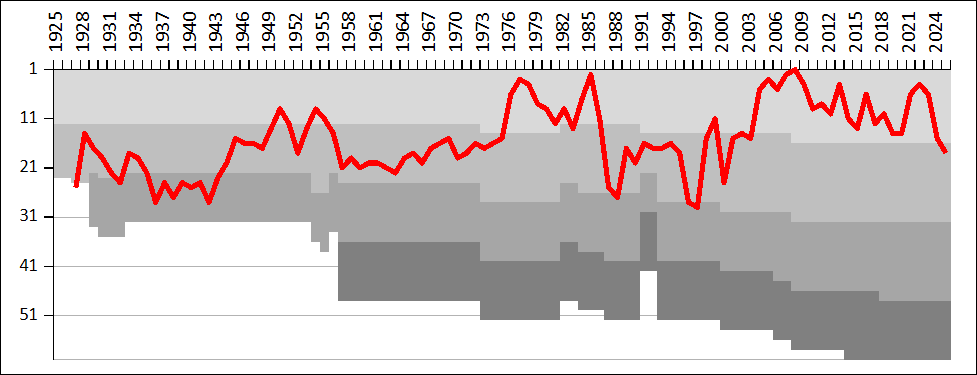
A chart showing the progress of Kalmar FF through the Swedish football league system. The different shades of gray represent league divisions.

After returning to Allsvenskan in 1998, but in 1999 the club fell out again, the only good thing was that the economy had been restored and was in good shape again. During the 2000 season club had to fight to avoid relegation from the second highest league and was only able to do it in the end of the season.

The goal of the 2001 season was to return to Allsvenskan again, after buying several new players such as Lasse Johansson, Fredrik Gärdeman and Lucas Nilsson, the club was able to return to Allsvenskan again, unfortunately the club was relegated directly. During the 2002 the first Brazilian, Alysson, arrived at the club.

The spell in Superettan 2003 became only one year as Kalmar won the league well ahead of Trelleborgs FF, purchase of Daniel Mendes and Dudu helped the club a lot.

In 2004 the club bought three new Brazilian players, Dedé Anderson, Fábio Augusto and César Santin, they all helped the club to a 5th place in Allsvenskan, just missing out on Royal League, the club also made a change board as chairman Ronny Nilsson left after 12 years at the helm, he was replaced by Tommy Strandman.

=== Champions ===

The lineup who won the league title, Allsvenskan, with a 2–2 away draw against Halmstads BK, 9 Nov 2008.

The two following seasons, 2005 and 2006, Kalmar ended up in 3rd and 5th respectively. Then in 2007 they made a great run from start to finish and finally ended up in second place after champions IFK Göteborg. They won Svenska Cupen the same year by beating IFK Göteborg with 3–0 at Fredriksskans in Kalmar.

Before the start, several Swedish experts believed that Kalmar FF would be one of the teams fighting for the championship title 2008, the club started the season stable and as the season went on the club performance became stronger and saw the club win many big victories, only other team able to keep up was IF Elfsborg. The club had to wait until the last match of the season against Halmstads BK in Halmstad before they could become champions. Before the final match Elfsborg was behind with 3 points and 9 goals. The match against Halmstads BK ended 2–2 placing the club 1 point ahead of Elfsborg. Patrik Ingelsten also became the league's top goalscorer of the season with 19 goals scored. The team reached the final in Svenska Cupen yet again and also this year against IFK Göteborg, however this year IFK won 5–4 on penalties after full-time and extra time had ended 0–0. The club also had the chance to reach the group stage of the UEFA Cup. After strong play against Racing FC from Luxembourg and Gent from Belgium, the club faced Dutch team Feyenoord, after winning 1–0 away in Rotterdam the club lost home with 1–2, in Borås at Borås Arena since Fredriksskans failed to reach UEFA demands, sending the club out of the competition on away goals.

== Colours, crest and kit ==
The colours and kits have changed several times over the course of history. From its founding in 1910, Kalmar FF were striped green and red. In 1915 it was changed to red shirts and black shorts. After 1927 red-white striped shirt and red shorts. 1934-35 they returned to the red shirt and black shorts. In 1940, the red-and-white striped shirt and red shorts again. Full red shirt and white shorts, like today, Kalmar FF had for the first time in 1944. In 1952–56, as countless other Swedish clubs, they had the then popular Arsenal costume, with white sleeves.

=== Kit manufacturers and sponsors ===
The club's first kit manufacturer was Adidas, until a three-year deal was agreed with Umbro in 1995. Puma received the contract in 1998 and their sponsorship lasted for seventeen years. In 2016, Hummel was presented as the new kit manufacturer of the club.

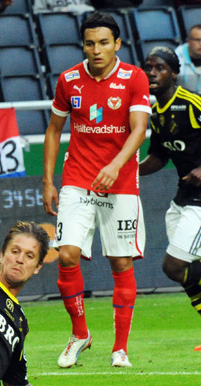
Emin Nouri wearing the Kalmar FF home kit in 2013.

| Period | Kit manufacturer | Shirt sponsor (chest) |
|---|---|---|
| 1977–80 | (Germany) Adidas | – |
| 1980–88 | (Germany) Adidas | Kalmar Verkstad |
| 1989–92 | (Germany) Adidas | Sparbanken |
| 1993–94 | (Germany) Adidas | RIFA, Sparbanken |
| 1995 | (England) Umbro | RIFA, Sparbanken |
| 1996–1997 | (England) Umbro | Sparbanken |
| 1998–2005 | (Germany) Puma | Flextronics, Föreningssparbanken |
| 2006 | (Germany) Puma | antilop.se, Föreningssparbanken |
| 2007–2009 | (Germany) Puma | Audio Video, SAS |
| 2010–2011 | (Germany) Puma | Audio Video |
| 2012–2015 | (Germany) Puma | Hjältevadshus |
| 2016–2019 | (Denmark) Hummel | Hjältevadshus |
| 2020 | (Denmark) Select | Hjältevadshus |
| 2021 | (Denmark) Select | – |
| 2022–2023 | (Denmark) Select | ICA |
| 2024– | (Denmark) Select | Multibygg |

== European record ==
- Q = Qualifying round

UEFA Champions League

| Season | Round | Opponents | Home leg | Away leg | Aggregate |
|---|---|---|---|---|---|
| 2009–10 | Q2 | (Hungary) Debreceni | 3–1 | 0–2 | 3–3 (a) |

UEFA Cup / UEFA Europa League

| Season | Round | Opponents | Home | Away | Aggregate |
|---|---|---|---|---|---|
| 1979–80 | 1 | (Iceland) Keflavik | 2–1 | 0–1 | 2–2 (a) |
| 1986–87 | 1 | (Germany) Bayer Leverkusen | 1–4 | 0–3 | 1–7 |
| 2008–09 | Q1 | Racing Union Luxembourg | 7–1 | 3–0 | 10–1 |
| 2008–09 | Q2 | (Belgium) AA Gent | 4–0 | 1–2 | 5–2 |
| 2008–09 | 1 | (Netherlands) Feyenoord | 1–2 | 1–0 | 2–2 (a) |
| 2010–11 | Q1 | (Faroe Islands) EB/Streymur | 1–0 | 3–0 | 4–0 |
| 2010–11 | Q2 | (Moldova) Dacia | 0–0 | 2–0 | 2–0 |
| 2010–11 | Q3 | (Bulgaria) Levski Sofia | 1–1 | 2–5 | 3–6 |
| 2012–13 | Q1 | (Northern Ireland) Cliftonville | 4–0 | 0–1 | 4–1 |
| 2012–13 | Q2 | (Croatia) Osijek | 3–0 | 3–1 | 6–1 |
| 2012–13 | Q3 | (Switzerland) Young Boys | 1–0 | 0–3 | 1–3 |

UEFA Cup Winners' Cup

| Season | Round | Opponents | Home | Away | Aggregate |
|---|---|---|---|---|---|
| 1978–79 | 1 | (Hungary) Ferencváros | 2–2 | 2–0 | 2–4 |
| 1981–82 | 1 | (Switzerland) Lausanne Sport | 3–2 | 2–1 | 4–4 (a) |
| 1987–88 | 1 | (Iceland) IA Akranes | 1–0 | 0–0 | 1–0 |
| 1987–88 | 2 | (Portugal) Sporting Lisbon | 1–0 | 5–0 | 1–5 |

UEFA Europa Conference League

| Season | Round | Opponents | Home leg | Away leg | Aggregate |
|---|---|---|---|---|---|
| 2023–24 | Q2 | (Armenia) Pyunik | 1−2 | 1−2 | 2−4 |

=== UEFA Club Coefficient Ranking ===
The following list ranks the current position of Kalmar FF in the UEFA ranking (as of 25 March 2024):

| Rank | Team | Points |
|---|---|---|
| 293 | (Hungary) Puskás Akadémia | 4.375 |
| 294 | (Hungary) Újpest | 4.375 |
| 295 | (Hungary) Honvéd | 4.375 |
| 296 | (Sweden) Kalmar | 4.300 |
| 297 | (Sweden) Elfsborg | 4.300 |
| 298 | (Sweden) Göteborg | 4.300 |
| 299 | (Sweden) Norrköping | 4.300 |

== Players ==
=== Current squad ===
As of 3 September 2026

Note: Flags indicate national team as defined under FIFA eligibility rules; some limited exceptions apply. Players may hold more than one non-FIFA nationality.

| No. | Pos. | Nation | Player |
|---|---|---|---|
| 1 | GK | SWE | Samuel Brolin |
| 2 | DF | SWE | Victor Larsson |
| 3 | DF | NOR | Sivert Engh Øverby |
| 4 | DF | SWE | Jesper Löfgren (on loan from Zürich) |
| 5 | MF | SWE | Melker Hallberg (captain) |
| 7 | MF | NED | Nassef Chourak |
| 9 | FW | SWE | Malcolm Stolt |
| 10 | MF | FIN | Marius Söderbäck |
| 11 | MF | FIN | Kasper Paananen (on loan from SJK) |
| 14 | FW | SWE | Elion Imeri |
| 17 | MF | SWE | Carl Gustafsson |
| 18 | DF | NGR | Sodiq Lawal |
| 19 | FW | DEN | Eskild Dall |

| No. | Pos. | Nation | Player |
|---|---|---|---|
| 20 | DF | SWE | Alexander Almqvist |
| 21 | MF | NGR | Abdussalam Magashy |
| 22 | MF | DEN | Tobias Lauritsen |
| 23 | MF | SWE | Robert Gojani |
| 24 | FW | ENG | Charles Sagoe Jr (on loan from Arsenal) |
| 25 | FW | SYR | Noah Shamoun (on loan from Randers) |
| 26 | DF | FIN | Miska Ylitolva (on loan from HJK) |
| 30 | GK | SWE | Jakob Kindberg |
| 32 | GK | SWE | Casper Andersson |
| 39 | DF | NOR | Lars Sætra |
| 47 | DF | GUI | Aboubacar Keita |
| 70 | FW | DEN | Emeka Nnamani |

=== Out on loan ===
Note: Flags indicate national team as defined under FIFA eligibility rules; some limited exceptions apply. Players may hold more than one non-FIFA nationality.

| No. | Pos. | Nation | Player |
|---|---|---|---|
| 6 | MF | SWE | Vilmer Tyrén (at Ljungskile until 30 November 2026) |
| 12 | DF | SWE | Zakarias Råvik (at IFK Värnamo until 30 November 2026) |
| 14 | MF | CIV | Awaka Djoro (at Oddevold until 30 November 2026) |
| 16 | MF | SWE | William Andersson (at Karlskrona until 30 November 2026) |

| No. | Pos. | Nation | Player |
|---|---|---|---|
| 28 | FW | SOM | Abdi Sabriye (at Jaro until 31 December 2026) |
| — | MF | SWE | Wilmer Andersson (at Karlskrona until 30 November 2026) |
| — | FW | SWE | Ville Nilsson (at Karlskrona until 30 November 2026) |

=== Retired numbers ===
Note: Flags indicate national team as defined under FIFA eligibility rules; some limited exceptions apply. Players may hold more than one non-FIFA nationality.

| No. | Pos. | Nation | Player |
|---|---|---|---|
| 8 | MF | SWE | Henrik Rydström (1993–2013) |
| 15 | MF | SWE | Johny Erlandsson (1973–88) |

== Management ==
=== Board ===
| Name | Role |
|---|---|
| (Sweden) Anders Henriksson | Acting Chairman |
| (Sweden) Joachim Lantz | Board Member |
| (Sweden) Karin Ekebjär | Board Member |
| (Sweden) Thomas Johansson | Board Member |
| (Sweden) Per Stephani | Board Member |
| (Sweden) Martin Bergvall Nilsson | Board Member |
| (Sweden) Lotta Petersson | Board Member |
| (Sweden) Andreas Öhlin | Board Member |

=== Technical Staff ===
| Name | Role |
|---|---|
| (Finland) Toni Koskela | Manager |
| (Spain) Guillem Santesmases | Assistant coach |
| (Sweden) Stefan Larsson | Assistant coach |
| (Sweden) Rasmus Elm | Individual coach |
| (Sweden) Donald Arvidsson | Goalkeeping coach |
| (Sweden) Lucas Nilsson | Academy director |
| (Sweden) Ola Ragnarsson | Team coordinator |
| (Sweden) Jörgen Pettersson | Sports director |
| (Sweden) Johan Öhlin | U16 Trainer |
| (Sweden) Mathias Svensson | Groundkeeper |

== Managers ==
- (Sweden) Gustaf Andersson (1936–38)
- (Sweden) Gösta Carlsson (1938–44)
- (Denmark) Arne Rasmussen (1944)
- (Sweden) Gösta Carlsson (1945–49)
- (Austria) Otto Cinadler (1946–47)
- (Sweden) Olle Ericsson (1949–50)
- (Hungary) István Wampetits (1951–55)
- (Wales) Bert Turner (1955–56)
- (Hungary) István Wampetits (1956–58)
- (Sweden) Olle Ericsson (1958)
- (Sweden) Sune Andersson (1959–61)
- (Sweden) Gösta Carlsson (1962)
- (Sweden) Bertil Bäckvall (1963–66)
- (Sweden) Bertil Wennerström (1967–68)
- (Hungary) Jószef Kovács (1969)
- (Sweden) Lars Arnesson (Jan 1, 1970 – Dec 31, 1972)
- (Sweden) Bo Johansson (1973 – Dec 31, 1973)
- (Sweden) Göran Andersson (1974)
- (Sweden) Kay Wiestål (1975–76)
- (Sweden) Eivert Bladh (1976)
- (Sweden) Bo Johansson (1977–78)
- (Sweden) Bo Falk (1979–81)
- (Sweden) Bo Johansson (1982–83)
- (Denmark) Allan Hebo Larsen (Jan 1, 1984 – Dec 31, 1986)
- (Sweden) Jan Sjöström (1987)
- (Sweden) Göran Andersson (1987–88)
- (Sweden) Börje Axelsson (1988–90)
- (Sweden) Alf Westerberg (Jan 1, 1991 – Dec 31, 1992)
- (Sweden) Kalle Björklund (Jan 1, 1993 – Dec 31, 1993)
- (Republic of Ireland) Patrick Walker (Jan 1, 1994 – Aug 27, 1996)
- (Sweden) Kjell Nyberg (Aug 28, 1996 – Dec 31, 1997)
- (Sweden) Nanne Bergstrand (Jan 1, 1998 – Dec 31, 1999)
- (England) Simon Hunt (Jan 1, 2000 – Sept 3, 2000)
- (Sweden) Ulf Ohlsson-Nordenhem (2000)
- (Sweden) Conny Karlsson (Sept 15, 2000 – Dec 31, 2002)
- (Sweden) Nanne Bergstrand (Jan 1, 2003 – Dec 31, 2013)
- (Sweden) Hans Eklund (Jan 1, 2014 – Nov 14, 2014)
- (Sweden) Peter Swärdh (Jan 1, 2015 – Jun 13, 2017)
- (Sweden) Nanne Bergstrand (Jun 13, 2017 – Jul 31, 2018)
- (Sweden) Henrik Rydström (Jul 31, 2018 – Nov 18, 2018)
- (Sweden) Magnus Pehrsson (Nov 27, 2018 – Oct 31 2019)
- (Sweden) Jens Nilsson (interim)
- (Sweden) Nanne Bergstrand (2020)
- (Sweden) Henrik Rydström (2021 – 2022)
- (Denmark) Henrik Jensen (2023 – 2024)
- (Sweden) Stefan Larsson (interim)
- (Finland) Toni Koskela (2024 – present)

== Honours ==
- Swedish Champions (Note: The title of "Swedish Champions" has been awarded to the winner of four different competitions over the years. Between 1896 and 1925 the title was awarded to the winner of Svenska Mästerskapet, a stand-alone cup tournament. No club were given the title between 1926 and 1930 even though the first-tier league Allsvenskan was played. In 1931 the title was reinstated and awarded to the winner of Allsvenskan. Between 1982 and 1990 a play-off in cup format was held at the end of the league season to decide the champions. After the play-off format in 1991 and 1992 the title was decided by the winner of Mästerskapsserien, an additional league after the end of Allsvenskan. Since the 1993 season the title has once again been awarded to the winner of Allsvenskan.)
  - Winners (1): 2008

=== League ===
- Allsvenskan:
  - Winners (1): 2008
  - Runners-up (2): 1985, 2007
- Superettan:
  - Winners (2): 2001, 2003
- Division 1 Södra:
  - Winners (1): 1998
  - Runners-up (1): 1994

=== Cups ===
- Svenska Cupen:
  - Winners (3): 1980–81, 1986–87, 2007
  - Runners-up (3): 1977–78, 2008, 2011
- Svenska Supercupen:
  - Winners (1): 2009
  - Runners-up (1): 2008
