= 2010 AIK Fotboll season =

AIK
2010 season
- Manager: Mikael Stahre (until 24 April); Björn Wesström (interim) (26 April – 22 June); Alex Miller (22 June – 10 November)
- Stadium: Råsunda Stadium
- Allsvenskan: 11th
- Svenska Cupen: Quarterfinal vs Helsingborg
- Svenska Supercupen: Champions
- UEFA Champions League: Third qualifying round vs Rosenborg
- UEFA Europa League: Playoff round vs Levski Sofia
- Top goalscorer: League: Mohamed Bangura (6); All: Mohamed Bangura (7)
- Highest home attendance: 21,181 vs Djurgården (2 May 2010)
- Lowest home attendance: 2,537 vs IFK Göteborg (6 March 2010)
- Average home league attendance: 11,925 (Allsvenskan - 31 October 2010); 11,149 (All competitions - 31 October 2010)

AIK suffered from a season of turmoil, starting with high-profile loan signing Sebastián Eguren being a flop, continuing with the resignation of 2009 double-winning coach Mikael Stahre and the reigning champions getting involved in a relegation scrap. A disappointing display in Europe, getting knocked out of both the Champions League and the Europa League early was followed by a decent autumn, which at least saved the contract, much thanks to IFK Värnamo recruit Mohamed Bangura proving to be a success.

== Season events ==
At the start of January, AIK sold Jos Hooiveld to Celtic for £2,000,000.

In February, Sebastián Eguren joined AIK from Villarreal.

In March, goalkeeper Kyriakos Stamatopoulos joined on loan for the season from Tromsø. Whilst Yussuf Saleh joined Syrianska in a similar deal.

The following month, April, Clécio joined on loan from Morrinhos until 30 June.

In May, AIK announced that they had taken Ivan Turina and Jerry Bengtson on trial.

On 4 June, Miran Burgić left AIK to sign for Wacker Innsbruck, whilst on 17 June, Jorge Ortiz returned to Arsenal de Sarandí.

At the end of June, AIK signed Helgi Daníelsson, Robert Persson, Goran Ljubojević and Admir Ćatović whilst Bojan Djordjic and Martin Kayongo-Mutumba both left the club to sign for Videoton in Hungary. Mohamed Bangura joined in Mid-July from Kallon.

At the end of August, Kevin Walker joined Assyriska on loan until 30 October.

On 3 December, AIK announced that both Nicklas Bergh and Saihou Jagne would be leaving the club when their contracts expired at the end of the season.

== Squad ==
As of match played 7 November 2010

No.	Name	Nationality	Position	Date of birth (age)	Signed from	Signed in	Contract ends	Apps.	Goals
Goalkeepers
12	Tomi Maanoja	(Finland)	GK	12 September 1986 (aged 24)	Honka	2008	2011	27	0
13	Kyriakos Stamatopoulos	(Canada)	GK	28 August 1979 (aged 31)	on loan from Tromsø	2010	2010	5	0
22	Nicklas Bergh	(Sweden)	GK	6 September 1982 (aged 28)	Eskilstuna City	2005		10	0
27	Ivan Turina	(Croatia)	GK	3 October 1980 (aged 30)	Dinamo Zagreb	2010		19	0
76	Lee Baxter	(Sweden)	GK	17 June 1976 (aged 34)	Landskrona BoIS	2008			
Defenders
2	Niklas Backman	(Sweden)	DF	13 November 1988 (aged 21)	Väsby United	2010		31	0
3	Per Karlsson	(Sweden)	DF	2 January 1986 (aged 24)	Academy	2003			
4	Nils-Eric Johansson	(Sweden)	DF	13 January 1980 (aged 30)	Leicester City	2007	2010	119	6
6	Walid Atta	(Sweden)	DF	28 August 1986 (aged 24)	Väsby United	2008		40	1
16	Martin Lorentzson	(Sweden)	DF	21 July 1984 (aged 26)	Assyriska	2010		19	1
23	Christoffer Eriksson	(Sweden)	DF	25 May 1990 (aged 20)	Väsby United	2010		8	0
Midfielders
5	Robert Persson	(Sweden)	MF	13 November 1979 (aged 30)	Malmö	2010			
7	Helgi Daníelsson	(Sweden)	MF	13 July 1981 (aged 29)	Hansa Rostock	2010		23	0
8	Daniel Tjernström	(Sweden)	MF	19 February 1974 (aged 36)	Örebro SK	1999			
14	Kenny Pavey	(England)	MF	23 August 1979 (aged 31)	Ljungskile	2006		127	14
18	Nicklas Maripuu	(Sweden)	MF	2 March 1992 (aged 18)	Väsby United	2010		2	0
24	Daniel Gustavsson	(Sweden)	MF	29 August 1990 (aged 20)	Västerås SK	2009		11	0
25	Yussuf Saleh	(Sweden)	MF	22 March 1984 (aged 26)	Vasalund	2008		16	0
28	Viktor Lundberg	(Sweden)	MF	4 March 1991 (aged 19)	Väsby United	2009		36	6
29	Gabriel Özkan	(Sweden)	MF	23 May 1986 (aged 24)	IF Brommapojkarna	2006		55	8
30	Dulee Johnson	(Liberia)	MF	7 November 1984 (aged 26)	Maccabi Tel Aviv	2009	2011	117	8
Forwards
9	Goran Ljubojević	(Croatia)	FW	4 May 1983 (aged 27)	NK Zagreb	2010		17	3
11	Antônio Flávio	(Brazil)	FW	5 January 1987 (aged 23)	Santo André	2009		51	10
17	Saihou Jagne	(The Gambia)	FW	10 October 1986 (aged 24)	Väsby United	2008		45	7
20	Mohamed Bangura	(Sierra Leone)	FW	27 July 1989 (aged 21)	Kallon	2010		17	7
21	Admir Ćatović	(Bosnia and Herzegovina)	FW	5 September 1987 (aged 23)	Väsby United	2010		16	1
26	Pontus Engblom	(Sweden)	FW	3 November 1991 (aged 19)	IFK Sundsvall	2009		27	2
Out on loan
15	Kevin Walker	(Sweden)	MF	3 August 1989 (aged 21)	Örebro	2007		19	1
	Sotirios Papagiannopoulos	(Sweden)	DF	5 September 1990 (aged 20)	Academy	2008		0	0
Left during the season
5	Jorge Ortiz	(Argentina)	MF	20 June 1984 (aged 26)	San Lorenzo	2008		67	1
7	Bojan Djordjic	(Sweden)	MF	6 February 1982 (aged 28)	Plymouth Argyle	2008		49	1
9	Miran Burgić	(Slovenia)	FW	25 September 1984 (aged 26)	Gorica	2006		68	16
10	Martin Kayongo-Mutumba	(Sweden)	FW	15 June 1985 (aged 25)	Väsby United	2009		44	4
20	Clécio	(Brazil)	FW	31 May 1988 (aged 22)	on loan from Morrinhos	2010	2010	3	0
33	Sebastián Eguren	(Uruguay)	MF	8 January 1981 (aged 29)	Villarreal	2010		8	0

== Transfers ==
=== In ===
Date	Position	Nationality	Name	From	Fee	Ref.
1 January 2010	DF	(Sweden)	Niklas Backman	Väsby United	Undisclosed	
1 January 2010	DF	(Sweden)	Martin Lorentzson	Assyriska	Undisclosed	
19 February 2010	MF	(Uruguay)	Sebastián Eguren	Villarreal	Undisclosed	
1 March 2010	DF	(Sweden)	Christoffer Eriksson	Väsby United	Undisclosed	
1 July 2010	GK	(Croatia)	Ivan Turina	Dinamo Zagreb	Undisclosed	
1 July 2010	MF	(Sweden)	Nicklas Maripuu	Väsby United	Undisclosed	
28 June 2010	MF	(Iceland)	Helgi Daníelsson	Hansa Rostock	Undisclosed	
28 June 2010	MF	(Sweden)	Robert Persson	Malmö	Undisclosed	
28 June 2010	FW	(Croatia)	Goran Ljubojević	NK Zagreb	Undisclosed	
28 June 2010	FW	(Bosnia and Herzegovina)	Admir Ćatović	Väsby United	Undisclosed	
19 July 2010	FW	(Sierra Leone)	Mohamed Bangura	Kallon	Undisclosed	

=== Loans in ===
Start date	Position	Nationality	Name	From	End date	Ref.
6 March 2010	GK	(Canada)	Kyriakos Stamatopoulos	Tromsø	31 December 2010	
11 April 2010	FW	(Brazil)	Clécio	Morrinhos	30 June 2010	

=== Out ===
Date	Position	Nationality	Name	To	Fee	Ref.
11 January 2010	DF	(Netherlands)	Jos Hooiveld	Celtic	£2,000,000	
4 June 2010	FW	(Slovenia)	Miran Burgić	Wacker Innsbruck	Undisclosed	
17 June 2010	MF	(Argentina)	Jorge Ortiz	Arsenal de Sarandí	Undisclosed	
28 June 2010	MF	(Sweden)	Bojan Djordjic	Videoton	Undisclosed	
28 June 2010	FW	(Sweden)	Martin Kayongo-Mutumba	Videoton	Undisclosed	
8 July 2010	MF	(Uruguay)	Sebastián Eguren	Sporting Gijón	Undisclosed	

=== Loans out ===
Start date	Position	Nationality	Name	To	End date	Ref.
1 January 2010	DF	(Sweden)	Sotirios Papagiannopoulos	Väsby United		
24 March 2010	MF	(Sweden)	Yussuf Saleh	Syrianska	1 December 2010	
28 August 2010	MF	(Sweden)	Kevin Walker	Assyriska	30 October 2010	

=== Released ===
Date	Position	Nationality	Name	Joined	Date	Ref
7 December 2010	MF	(Liberia)	Dulee Johnson	Panetolikos	21 January 2011	
31 December 2010	GK	(Sweden)	Nicklas Bergh	Eskilstuna City		
31 December 2010	FW	(The Gambia)	Saihou Jagne	IF Brommapojkarna		

=== Trial ===
Date from	Position	Nationality	Name	Last club	Date to	Ref
May 2010	GK	(Croatia)	Ivan Turina	Dinamo Zagreb		
May 2010	FW	(Honduras)	Jerry Bengtson	Vida		

== Competitions ==
=== Overview ===
Competition	First match	Last match	Starting round	Final position	Record							
Competition	First match	Last match	Starting round	Final position	Pld	W	D	L	GF	GA	GD	Win %
Allsvenskan	14 March 2010	7 November 2010	Matchday 1	11th	30	10	5	15	29	36	−7	33.33
Svenska Cupen	25 May 2010	9 July 2010	Third round	Quarterfinal	3	2	1	0	6	3	+3	66.67
Svenska Supercupen	6 March 2010	6 March 2010	Final	Winners	1	1	0	0	1	0	+1	100.00
UEFA Champions League	13 July 2010	4 August 2010	Second qualifying round	Third qualifying round	4	1	1	2	1	4	−3	25.00
UEFA Europa League	19 August 2010	26 August 2010	Playoff round	Playoff round	2	0	1	1	1	2	−1	0.00
Total					40	14	8	18	38	45	−7	35.00

Last updated: 7 November 2010
Source: Competitions

=== Svenska Supercupen ===
6 March 2010	AIK	1–0	IFK Göteborg	Stockholm
16:00 CET (UTC+1)	Flávio 22'; Djordjic (yellow card) 31'; Pavey (yellow card) 35'; Eguren (yellow card) 77'; Atta (yellow card) 79'	Report	Olsson (yellow card) 9'; Bjarnason (yellow card) 30'; Jónsson (yellow card) 36'; Ericsson (yellow card) 62'	Stadium: Råsunda Stadium; Attendance: 2,537; Referee: Markus Strömbergsson

=== Allsvenskan ===
==== League table ====
Pos	Team	Pld	W	D	L	GF	GA	GD	Pts
9	Kalmar FF	30	10	10	10	36	38	−2	40
10	Djurgårdens IF	30	11	7	12	35	42	−7	40
11	AIK	30	10	5	15	29	36	−7	35
12	Halmstads BK	30	10	5	15	31	42	−11	35
13	GAIS	30	8	8	14	24	35	−11	32

Source: svenskfotboll.se (in Swedish)
Rules for classification: 1) points; 2) goal difference; 3) number of goals scored.

==== Results summary ====
Overall								Home						Away					
Pld	W	D	L	GF	GA	GD	Pts	W	D	L	GF	GA	GD	W	D	L	GF	GA	GD
30	10	5	15	29	36	−7	35	7	2	6	19	13	+6	3	3	9	10	23	−13

Last updated: 7 November 2010.
Source: Results

==== Results by matchday ====
Matchday	1	2	3	4	5	6	7	8	9	10	11	12	13	14	15	16	17	18	19	20	21	22	23	24	25	26	27	28	29	30
Ground	H	A	A	H	A	H	A	H	A	H	A	H	A	H	H	A	A	H	H	A	H	A	A	H	H	A	H	A	H	A
Result	D	D	L	L	L	L	W	D	L	L	L	W	L	W	W	L	D	W	W	L	L	L	W	L	L	L	W	W	W	D
Position	5	10	13	15	15	15	14	13	15	15	16	15	15	14	14	15	15	15	11	13	14	14	15	13	14	14	14	13	11	11

Updated to match(es) played on 7 November 2010. Source: Results
A = Away; H = Home; W = Win; D = Draw; L = Loss; P = Postponed

==== Results ====
14 March 2010 1	AIK	0–0	Mjällby	Stockholm
14:32 CET (UTC+1)	Atta (yellow card) 2'; Pavey (yellow card) 14'; Djordjic (yellow card) 90+3'	Report	Grahn (yellow card) 90+2'	Stadium: Råsunda Stadion; Attendance: 17,111; Referee: Michael Lerjéus

20 March 2010 2	Brommapojkarna	0–0	AIK	Stockholm
16:00 CET (UTC+1)	Eriksson (yellow card) 24'; Chhadeh (yellow card) 56'; Segerström (yellow card) 75'	Report	Karlsson (yellow card) 47'; Eguren (yellow card) 75' (yellow-red card) 82'; Pavey (red card) 84'; Djordjic (yellow card) 85'	Stadium: Grimsta IP; Attendance: 4,304; Referee: Martin Ingvarsson

29 March 2010 3	GAIS	3–1	AIK	Gothenburg
19:00 CEST (UTC+2)	Ekunde (yellow card) 31'; Anell 43', 59'; Andersson 66'; Lycén (yellow card) 69'	Report	Ortiz (yellow card) 17'; Kayongo-Mutumba (yellow card) 22'; Atta 52'; Johansson (yellow card) 84'	Stadium: Gamla Ullevi; Attendance: 3,950; Referee: Stefan Johannesson

5 April 2010 4	AIK	0–1	Örebro	Stockholm
15:00 CEST (UTC+2)	Djordjic (yellow card) 84'	Report	Olsen 24'; Gerzić (yellow card) 35' (yellow-red card) 88'; Anttonen (yellow card) 45+1'	Stadium: Råsunda Stadion; Attendance: 8,921; Referee: Tobias Mattsson

11 April 2010 5	Gefle	1–0	AIK	Gävle
15:00 CEST (UTC+2)	Gerndt 15'	Report	Pavey (yellow card) 56'; Lundberg (yellow card) 81'	Stadium: Strömvallen; Attendance: 4,233; Referee: Martin Hansson

14 April 2010 6	AIK	0–1	Halmstad	Stockholm
19:00 CEST (UTC+2)	Karlsson (yellow card) 39'; Johnson (yellow card) 65'; Djordjic (yellow card) 89'	Report	Žvirgždauskas (yellow card) 20'; Sævarsson 89'	Stadium: Råsunda Stadion; Attendance: 9,588; Referee: Markus Strömbergsson

19 April 2010 7	Kalmar FF	0–3	AIK	Kalmar
19:00 CEST (UTC+2)		Report	Burgić 31', 67'; Johnson 45+2'	Stadium: Fredriksskans; Attendance: 4,385; Referee: Michael Lerjéus

24 April 2010 8	AIK	1–1	BK Häcken	Stockholm
16:00 CEST (UTC+2)	Burgić (yellow card) 34'; Johnson 38'	Report	Chibuike (yellow card) 15'; Chatto 45+1'	Stadium: Råsunda Stadion; Attendance: 10,582; Referee: Martin Hansson

29 April 2010 9	Helsingborg	1–0	AIK	Helsingborg
19:00 CEST (UTC+2)	Sundin (yellow card) 32'; Lindström 37'; Bouaouzan (yellow card) 90+2'	Report	Djordjic (yellow card) 30'; Clécio (yellow card) 66'; Johansson (yellow card) 85'; Flávio (yellow card) 89'	Stadium: Olympia; Attendance: 9,022; Referee: Martin Ingvarsson

2 May 2010 10	AIK	1–2	Djurgården	Stockholm
12:30 CEST (UTC+2)	Toivio 2' (o.g.); Ortiz (yellow card) 50'; Pavey (yellow card) 62'; Flávio (yellow card) 78'	Report	Perovuo 38' (yellow card) 41'; Ayuba (yellow card) 40' (yellow-red card) 88'; Oremo 72'	Stadium: Råsunda Stadion; Attendance: 21,181; Referee: Stefan Johannesson

6 May 2010 11	IFK Göteborg	4–0	AIK	Gothenburg
19:00 CEST (UTC+2)	Olsson (yellow card) 33' (goal) 37', 52'; Söder 60'; Bjarnason 72'	Report	Djordjic (yellow card) 27'; Johansson (yellow card) 76'; Burgić (yellow card) 90+3'	Stadium: Gamla Ullevi; Attendance: 12,020; Referee: Jonas Eriksson

9 May 2010 12	AIK	1–0	Trelleborg	Stockholm
17:00 CEST (UTC+2)	Flávio 34'	Report		Stadium: Råsunda Stadion; Attendance: 8,659; Referee: Michael Lerjéus

12 May 2010 13	Elfsborg	4–0	AIK	Borås
20:00 CEST (UTC+2)	Avdić 5', 55' (pen.); Ericsson 20'; Nordmark (yellow card) 22'; Jawo 63'	Report	Johansson (yellow card) 37'; Pavey (yellow card) 43'; Karlsson (red card) 54'	Stadium: Borås Arena; Attendance: 8,132; Referee: Martin Hansson

17 May 2010 14	AIK	4–1	Åtvidaberg	Stockholm
19:00 CEST (UTC+2)	Burgić 4', 15', 89' (pen.); Lundberg (yellow card) 90+2'; Walker 90+3'	Report	Karlsson (yellow card) 24'; Roiha (yellow card) 45' (goal) 63'	Stadium: Råsunda Stadion; Attendance: 21,084; Referee: Sven-Martin Åkesson

17 July 2010 15	AIK	2–0	Malmö	Stockholm
16:00 CEST (UTC+2)	Pavey 2' (pen.); Flávio 40'; Johansson (yellow card) 52'	Report	Dahlin (yellow card) 1'; Ofere (yellow card) 61' (red card) 75'	Stadium: Råsunda Stadion; Attendance: 10,347; Referee: Jonas Eriksson

24 July 2010 16	Malmö	1–0	AIK	Malmö
16:00 CEST (UTC+2)	Mehmeti 41'; Andersson (yellow card) 55'; Pękalski (yellow card) 90+4'	Report	Atta (yellow card) 33'; Daníelsson (yellow card) 54'; Persson (yellow card) 87'; Pavey (yellow card) 90+5'	Stadium: Swedbank Stadion; Attendance: 14,149; Referee: Michael Lerjéus

31 July 2010 17	Mjällby	0–0	AIK	Hällevik
16:00 CEST (UTC+2)		Report	Daníelsson (yellow card) 15'; Johansson (yellow card) 31'	Stadium: Strandvallen; Attendance: 6,869; Referee: Daniel Stålhammar

8 August 2010 18	AIK	2–1	Brommapojkarna	Stockholm
16:30 CEST (UTC+2)	Bangura 4', 90'; Persson (yellow card) 44'; Atta (red card) 90+2'	Report	Arce 23' (yellow card) 30'; Stefanidis (yellow card) 50'; Chhadeh (yellow card) 89'; Asp (yellow card) 90+2'	Stadium: Råsunda Stadion; Attendance: 9,818; Referee: Magnus Ahlsén

14 August 2010 19	AIK	1–0	GAIS	Stockholm
16:00 CEST (UTC+2)	Flávio (yellow card) 28'; Pavey 87' (pen.); Daníelsson (yellow card) 89'	Report	Lindberg (yellow card) 22'; Jankulovski (yellow card) 80'	Stadium: Råsunda Stadion; Attendance: 9,497; Referee: Jonas Eriksson

23 August 2010 20	Örebro	1–0	AIK	Örebro
19:00 CEST (UTC+2)	Gerzić (yellow card) 87' (goal) 90+4'; Ajdarević (yellow card) 90+3'	Report	Persson (yellow card) 23'; Pavey (yellow card) 39'; Johnson (yellow card) 69'; Lundberg (yellow card) 88'	Stadium: Behrn Arena; Attendance: 9,678; Referee: Daniel Stålhammar

29 August 2010 21	AIK	1–2	IFK Göteborg	Stockholm
16:30 CEST (UTC+2)	Bangura 90+1'	Report	Bjarnason 7' (yellow card) 32'; Lund (yellow card) 58'; Bärkroth 78'	Stadium: Råsunda Stadion; Attendance: 12,465; Referee: Martin Hansson

11 September 2010 22	Trelleborg	4–1	AIK	Trelleborg
16:00 CEST (UTC+2)	Drugge 9'; Jensen 18', 20'; Haynes 69'	Report	Pavey (yellow card) 21'; Johansson (red card) 56'; Bangura (yellow card) 63'; Lundberg 80'	Stadium: Vångavallen; Attendance: 2,340; Referee: Martin Hansson

18 September 2010 23	BK Häcken	0–1	AIK	Gothenburg
16:00 CEST (UTC+2)	Karlsson (yellow card) 41'; Friberg (yellow card) 74'; Ranégie (yellow card) 90+4'	Report	Daníelsson (yellow card) 29'; Lundberg 62'	Stadium: Rambergsvallen; Attendance: 2,383; Referee: Tobias Mattsson

22 September 2010 24	AIK	0–1	Kalmar FF	Stockholm
19:00 CEST (UTC+2)	Pavey (yellow card) 64'; Lundberg (yellow card) 67'	Report	Mendes 53'; Israelsson (yellow card) 70'	Stadium: Råsunda Stadion; Attendance: 9,431; Referee: Martin Hansson

27 September 2010 25	AIK	2–3	Helsingborg	Stockholm
19:00 CEST (UTC+2)	Bangura 18'; Nilsson 77' (o.g.)	Report	Sundin 44'; Jönsson 75'; Andersson 81'	Stadium: Råsunda Stadion; Attendance: 8,078; Referee: Michael Lerjéus

3 October 2010 26	Djurgården	2–1	AIK	Stockholm
16:30 CEST (UTC+2)	Igboananike 42'; Touma 47'; Sjölund (yellow card) 79'	Report	Pavey 9' (pen.); Persson (yellow card) 12'; Ljubojević (yellow card) 37'	Stadium: Råsunda Stadium; Attendance: 18,511; Referee: Stefan Johannesson

16 October 2010 27	AIK	2–0	Gefle	Stockholm
16:00 CEST (UTC+2)	Ljubojević 60'; Bangura 75'; Persson (yellow card) 76'	Report	Mård (yellow card) 57'	Stadium: Råsunda Stadion; Attendance: 10,449; Referee: Jonas Eriksson

25 October 2010 28	Halmstad	1–2	AIK	Halmstad
19:00 CEST (UTC+2)	Sise (yellow card) 52'; Anselmo 88'	Report	Lundberg 64'; Pavey 69' (pen.); Turina (yellow card) 88'	Stadium: Örjans Vall; Attendance: 4,172; Referee: Martin Hansson

31 October 2010 29	AIK	2–0	Elfsborg	Stockholm
17:00 CET (UTC+1)	Pavey (yellow card) 37'; Bangura 50'; Ljubojević (yellow card) 72'; Lundberg 75' (yellow card) 76'	Report	Mobaeck (yellow card) 65'	Stadium: Råsunda Stadion; Attendance: 11,670; Referee: Michael Lerjéus

7 November 2010 30	Åtvidaberg	1–1	AIK	Åtvidaberg
16:30 CET (UTC+1)	Prodell 75'	Report	Ljubojević 47'	Stadium: Kopparvallen; Attendance: 5,687; Referee: Martin Hansson

=== Svenska Cupen ===
25 May 2010 Third Round	Öster	1–3 (a.e.t.)	AIK	Växjö
19:00 CEST (UTC+2)	Henningsson 59'	Report	Johansson 61'; Özkan 104'; Engblom 108'	Stadium: Värendsvallen; Attendance: 1,155; Referee: Daniel Stålhammar

5 July 2010 Fourth Round	Ängelholms FF	1–2 (a.e.t.)	AIK	Ängelholm
19:00 CEST (UTC+2)	Dahlgren 1' (pen.); Andersson (yellow card) 58'	Report	Turina (yellow card) 1'; Johnson (yellow card) 38'; Lorentzson 65'; Pavey (yellow card) 87'; Flávio 120'	Stadium: Ängelholms IP; Attendance: 1,507; Referee: Martin Ingvarsson

9 July 2010 Quarterfinal	AIK	1–1 (a.e.t.) (3–4 p)	Helsingborg	Stockholm
17:00 CEST (UTC+2)	Ljubojević 33'; Karlsson (yellow card) 54'; Pavey (yellow card) 66'	Report	Lindström 41'; Sundin (yellow card) 43'; Lantz (yellow card) 46'	Stadium: Råsunda Stadium; Attendance: 5,061; Referee: Martin Strömbergsson
	Penalties
	Johansson (penalty scored); Danielsson (penalty missed); Pavey (penalty scored); Flávio (penalty scored); Atta (penalty missed)		(penalty scored) Lindström; (penalty scored) Nilsson; (penalty scored) Makondele; (penalty missed) Gashi; (penalty scored) Andersson

=== UEFA Champions League ===
==== Qualifying rounds ====
13 July 2010 Second qualifying round 1st leg	AIK (Sweden)	1–0	(Luxembourg) Jeunesse Esch	Stockholm, Sweden
19:00 CEST (UTC+2)	Engblom 57'	Report	Moreira (yellow card) 87'	Stadium: Råsunda Stadium; Attendance: 11,515; Referee: Hubert Siejewicz (Poland)

21 July 2010 Second qualifying round 2nd leg	Jeunesse Esch (Luxembourg)	0–0 (0–1 agg.)	(Sweden) AIK	Esch-sur-Alzette, Luxembourg
17:00 CEST (UTC+2)	Rodriguez (yellow card) 21'; Hoffmann (yellow card) 63'; Cantonnet (yellow card) 73'; Collette (yellow card) 83'	Report		Stadium: Stade de la Frontière; Attendance: 1,568; Referee: Huw Jones (Wales)

28 July 2010 Third qualifying round 1st leg	AIK (Sweden)	0–1	(Norway) Rosenborg	Stockholm, Sweden
20:45 CEST (UTC+2)	Persson (yellow card) 18'; Turina (yellow card) 65'; Bangura (yellow card) 70'	Report	Henriksen 33'	Stadium: Råsunda Stadium; Attendance: 16,768; Referee: Thorsten Kinhöfer (Germany)

4 August 2010 Third qualifying round 2nd leg	Rosenborg (Norway)	3–0 (4–0 agg.)	(Sweden) AIK	Trondheim, Norway
20:45 CEST (UTC+2)	Prica 55'; Demidov 64'; Lustig 76'	Report	Johansson (yellow card) 42'	Stadium: Lerkendal Stadion; Attendance: 14,707; Referee: Eduardo Iturralde González (Spain)

=== UEFA Europa League ===
==== Playoff round ====
19 August 2010 1st leg	AIK (Sweden)	0–0	(Bulgaria) Levski Sofia	Stockholm, Sweden
19:00 CEST (UTC+2)	Lorentzson (yellow card) 64'	Report	Ivanov (yellow card) 7'; Greene (yellow card) 39'; Mulder (yellow card) 58'; Miliev (yellow card) 84'	Stadium: Råsunda Stadium; Attendance: 8,212; Referee: Pavel Kralovec (Czech Republic)

26 August 2010 2nd leg	Levski Sofia (Bulgaria)	2–1 (2–1 agg.)	(Sweden) AIK	Sofia, Bulgaria
20:30 CEST (UTC+2)	Mladenov 49'; Minev (yellow card) 45+1'; Dembélé 51'; Miliev (yellow card) 60'; Tasevski (yellow card) 61'; Gadzhev (yellow card) 90+3'	Report	Bangura 11'; Engblom (yellow card) 25'; Lundberg (yellow card) 73'; Johansson (yellow card) 73'	Stadium: Stadion Georgi Asparuhov; Attendance: 23,000; Referee: Viktor Shvetsov (Ukraine)

== Squad statistics ==
As of match played 7 November 2010

=== Appearances and goals ===
No.	Pos	Nat	Player	Total		Allsvenskan		Svenska Cupen		Svenska Supercupen		UEFA Champions League		UEFA Europa League	
No.	Pos	Nat	Player	Apps	Goals	Apps	Goals	Apps	Goals	Apps	Goals	Apps	Goals	Apps	Goals
2	DF	(Sweden) SWE	Niklas Backman	31	0	22+2	0	2+1	0	0	0	2	0	2	0
3	DF	(Sweden) SWE	Per Karlsson	30	0	21	0	2	0	1	0	4	0	2	0
4	DF	(Sweden) SWE	Nils-Eric Johansson	36	1	26	0	3	1	1	0	4	0	2	0
5	MF	(Sweden) SWE	Robert Persson	18	0	13	0	1	0	0	0	2	0	2	0
6	DF	(Sweden) SWE	Walid Atta	19	1	13	1	2	0	1	0	3	0	0	0
7	MF	(Iceland) ISL	Helgi Daníelsson	23	0	14+1	0	2	0	0	0	4	0	2	0
8	MF	(Sweden) SWE	Daniel Tjernström	30	0	15+5	0	2+1	0	1	0	4	0	2	0
9	FW	(Croatia) CRO	Goran Ljubojević	17	3	7+4	2	1	1	0	0	3+1	0	0+1	0
10	FW	(Sweden) SWE	Martin Kayongo-Mutumba	15	0	13	0	1	0	1	0	0	0	0	0
11	FW	(Brazil) BRA	Antônio Flávio	36	4	25+2	2	1+2	1	1	1	2+1	0	0+2	0
12	GK	(Finland) FIN	Tomi Maanoja	15	0	14	0	0	0	1	0	0	0	0	0
13	GK	(Canada) CAN	Kyriakos Stamatopoulos	5	0	4	0	1	0	0	0	0	0	0	0
14	MF	(England) ENG	Kenny Pavey	35	4	24+1	4	3	0	1	0	4	0	2	0
15	MF	(Sweden) SWE	Kevin Walker	5	1	2+2	1	1	0	0	0	0	0	0	0
16	DF	(Sweden) SWE	Martin Lorentzson	19	1	11+3	0	3	1	0	0	0	0	1+1	0
17	FW	(The Gambia) GAM	Saihou Jagne	5	0	0+4	0	0	0	0	0	0	0	1	0
18	MF	(Sweden) SWE	Nicklas Maripuu	2	0	0+2	0	0	0	0	0	0	0	0	0
20	FW	(Sierra Leone) SLE	Mohamed Bangura	17	7	12+1	6	0	0	0	0	2	0	2	1
21	FW	(Bosnia and Herzegovina) BIH	Admir Ćatović	12	0	4+6	0	1	0	0	0	0+1	0	0	0
23	DF	(Sweden) SWE	Christoffer Eriksson	8	0	4+3	0	1	0	0	0	0	0	0	0
24	MF	(Sweden) SWE	Daniel Gustavsson	10	0	0+7	0	1+1	0	0	0	0+1	0	0	0
26	FW	(Sweden) SWE	Pontus Engblom	25	2	8+9	0	1+2	1	0	0	2+1	1	2	0
27	GK	(Croatia) CRO	Ivan Turina	19	0	12	0	1	0	0	0	4	0	2	0
28	MF	(Sweden) SWE	Viktor Lundberg	29	4	12+10	4	1+1	0	0	0	0+3	0	1+1	0
29	MF	(Sweden) SWE	Gabriel Özkan	8	1	1+6	0	0+1	1	0	0	0	0	0	0
30	MF	(Liberia) LBR	Dulee Johnson	25	2	18+2	2	1	0	0	0	4	0	0	0
76	GK	(Sweden) SWE	Lee Baxter	1	0	0	0	1	0	0	0	0	0	0	0
Players away on loan:
Players who appeared for AIK but left during the season:
5	MF	(Uruguay) URU	Jorge Ortiz	8	0	7	0	0	0	1	0	0	0	0	0
7	MF	(Sweden) SWE	Bojan Djordjic	13	0	12	0	0	0	1	0	0	0	0	0
9	FW	(Slovenia) SLO	Miran Burgić	13	5	8+4	5	0	0	0+1	0	0	0	0	0
20	FW	(Brazil) BRA	Clécio	3	0	1+2	0	0	0	0	0	0	0	0	0
33	MF	(Uruguay) URU	Sebastián Eguren	8	0	7	0	0	0	1	0	0	0	0	0

=== Goal scorers ===
Place	Position	Nation	Number	Name	Allsvenskan	Svenska Cupen	Svenska Supercupen	UEFA Champions League	UEFA Europa League	Total
1	FW	(Sierra Leone)	20	Mohamed Bangura	6	0	0	0	1	7
2	FW	(Slovenia)	9	Miran Burgić	5	0	0	0	0	5
3	MF	(England)	14	Kenny Pavey	4	0	0	0	0	4
3	MF	(Sweden)	28	Viktor Lundberg	4	0	0	0	0	4
3	FW	(Brazil)	11	Antônio Flávio	2	1	1	0	0	4
6	FW	(Croatia)	9	Goran Ljubojević	2	1	0	0	0	3
7	MF	(Liberia)	30	Dulee Johnson	2	0	0	0	0	2
7	FW	(Sweden)	26	Pontus Engblom	0	1	0	1	0	2
7				Own goal	2	0	0	0	0	2
10	DF	(Sweden)	6	Walid Atta	1	0	0	0	0	1
10	MF	(Sweden)	15	Kevin Walker	1	0	0	0	0	1
10	DF	(Sweden)	4	Nils-Eric Johansson	0	1	0	0	0	1
10	MF	(Sweden)	29	Gabriel Özkan	0	1	0	0	0	1
10	DF	(Sweden)	16	Martin Lorentzson	0	1	0	0	0	1
TOTALS					29	6	1	1	1	38

=== Clean sheets ===
Place	Position	Nation	Number	Name	Allsvenskan	Svenska Cupen	Svenska Supercupen	UEFA Champions League	UEFA Europa League	Total
1	GK	(Croatia)	27	Ivan Turina	5	0	0	2	1	8
2	GK	(Finland)	12	Tomi Maanoja	4	0	1	0	0	5
3	GK	(Canada)	13	Kyriakos Stamatopoulos	1	0	0	0	0	1
TOTALS					10	0	1	2	1	14

=== Disciplinary record ===
Number	Nation	Position	Name	Allsvenskan		Svenska Cupen		Svenska Supercupen		UEFA Champions League		UEFA Europa League		Total	
Number	Nation	Position	Name	Yellow card	Red card	Yellow card	Red card	Yellow card	Red card	Yellow card	Red card	Yellow card	Red card	Yellow card	Red card
3	(Sweden)	DF	Per Karlsson	2	1	1	0	0	0	0	0	0	0	3	1
4	(Sweden)	DF	Nils-Eric Johansson	6	1	1	0	0	0	1	0	1	0	9	1
5	(Sweden)	DF	Robert Persson	5	0	0	0	0	0	1	0	0	0	6	0
6	(Sweden)	DF	Walid Atta	2	1	1	0	0	0	0	0	0	0	3	1
7	(Iceland)	MF	Helgi Daníelsson	4	0	0	0	0	0	0	0	0	0	4	0
9	(Croatia)	FW	Goran Ljubojević	2	0	0	0	0	0	0	0	0	0	2	0
11	(Brazil)	FW	Antônio Flávio	3	0	0	0	0	0	0	0	0	0	3	0
14	(England)	MF	Kenny Pavey	9	1	2	0	1	0	0	0	0	0	11	1
16	(Sweden)	DF	Martin Lorentzson	0	0	0	0	0	0	0	0	1	0	1	0
20	(Sierra Leone)	FW	Mohamed Bangura	1	0	0	0	0	0	1	0	0	0	2	0
26	(Sweden)	FW	Pontus Engblom	0	0	0	0	0	0	0	0	1	0	1	0
27	(Croatia)	GK	Ivan Turina	1	0	1	0	0	0	1	0	0	0	3	0
28	(Sweden)	MF	Viktor Lundberg	5	0	0	0	0	0	0	0	1	0	6	0
Players away on loan:
Players who left AIK during the season:
5	(Uruguay)	MF	Jorge Ortiz	2	0	0	0	0	0	0	0	0	0	2	0
7	(Sweden)	MF	Bojan Djordjic	6	0	1	0	0	0	0	0	0	0	7	0
9	(Slovenia)	FW	Miran Burgić	2	0	0	0	0	0	0	0	0	0	2	0
10	(Sweden)	FW	Martin Kayongo-Mutumba	1	0	0	0	0	0	0	0	0	0	1	0
20	(Brazil)	FW	Clécio	1	0	0	0	0	0	0	0	0	0	1	0
30	(Liberia)	MF	Dulee Johnson	2	0	1	0	0	0	0	0	0	0	3	0
33	(Uruguay)	MF	Sebastián Eguren	2	1	1	0	0	0	0	0	0	0	3	1
Total				56	5	6	0	4	0	4	0	4	0	74	5

== Sources ==
- "AIK Fotboll". Soccerway. Archived from the original on April 2, 2019.
