= Björn Wesström =

Swedish football executive

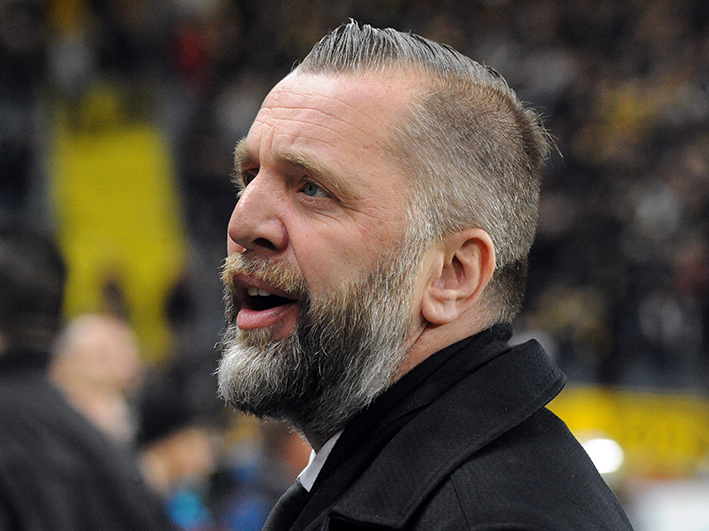
- Wesström in 2015 with AIK

Personal information
- Full name: Björn Tom Wesström
- Date of birth: 11 September 1972 (age 54)
- Place of birth: Upplands Väsby, Stockholm, Sweden

Managerial career
- Years: Team
- 1999–2006: AIK youth (consultant and manager)
- 2006–2007: AIK (assistant coach)
- 2007–2008: Väsby United (head coach)
- 2008: AIK (head scout)
- 2009–2010: AIK (sporting director)
- 2010: AIK (caretaker)
- 2010–2011: AIK (assistant coach)
- 2011–2012: AIK (head scout)
- 2013–2020: AIK (sporting director)
- 2020–2021: AIK (CEO)
- 2022–2024: Odense BK (football director)
- 2024: Kerala Blasters (assistant coach)

Björn Tom Wesström (born 11 September 1972) is a Swedish football executive and manager who was recently sacked from the assistant coach position of the Indian Super League club Kerala Blasters.

== Career ==
=== Early life ===
Björn Wesström was born on 11 September 1972 in the Upplands Väsby in Stockholm County, Sweden. Despite not having a career as a football player, Wesström started his career is management at the age of 27 with AIK Fotboll in 1999.

=== AIK Fotboll (1999-2021) ===
Wesström began his management career with the Swedish club AIK in 1999, where he served as a consultant for their youth team during his initial years, and would eventually serve as the head coach of AIK's under-19 football team.

His first significant role came in 2007 when he was appointed as the head coach of FC Väsby United (now AFC Eskilstuna), a club affiliated with AIK, where he worked alongside Mikael Stahre as the head coach for the 2007 Swedish Division 1 season. Under their management, Väsby United achieved a second-place finish in the league, securing promotion to the Superettan, the second-tier of Swedish football.

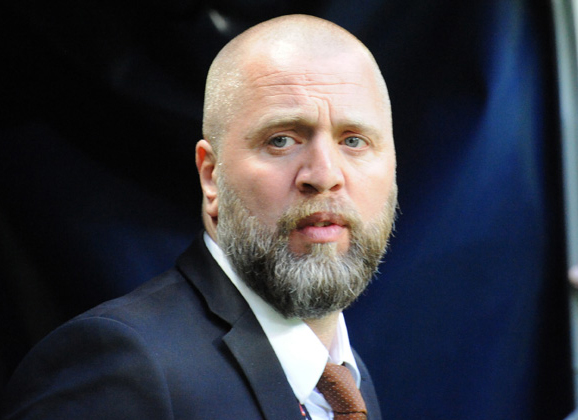
Björn Wesström in 2013.

One year following his success with the Väsby United, Wesström was appointed as the head of scouting operations for AIK's men's team. On 11 November 2008, he was promoted to the role of sporting director, succeeding Ola Andersson following his resignation from the post. During his first year at the club as the sporting director in the 2009 season, AIK won the Swedish top-tier league Allsvenskan and the Svenska Cupen, completing the double and qualifying for the UEFA Champions league qualifiers. He would also go on to win the 2010 Svenska Supercupen during his tenure as the sporting director.

In the early stages of the 2010 season, Mikael Stahre resigned as the club's head coach and as a result, Wesström was appointed as the caretaker manager of AIK on 26 April 2010 with immediate effect. His first match as the caretaker came on 29 April against the rivals Helsingborgs IF, which they lost 1–0. After a series of disappointing results, and due to the club's failure for securing the UEFA coaching license for Wesström for managing the team in the 2010–11 UEFA Champions League second qualifying round, the club appointed Alex Miller as their new head coach and Wesström was appointed as his assistant for the rest of the season.

Wesström was reinstated as the scouting head in the 2011 season, and would go on for scouting across the Balkans and Africa.

From 2013 to 2020, Wesström served his second term as the sporting director at the club, and in 2021, he was appointed as the club's director by the board, which would also ultimately make him the CEO of AIK Fotboll. However, on 24 June 2021, Wesström resigned as AIK's CEO just one year following his appointment, and would subsequently leave the club following his long 22 years at the Swedish club.

=== Odense Boldklub (2021-2024) ===
Following his departure from AIK, Wesström joined the Danish Superliga club Odense Boldklub as their director of football. He was reunited with the head coach Andreas Alm, under whom he served as the scouting head in 2011 at AIK. He signed the contract with Odense in July 2021, and took up his role as the football director from 1 January 2022. He served at the Danish club for two years, but was sacked from his role on 27 May 2024 after the club was relegated to the Danish 1st Division (second-tier league) following a disappointing 2023–24 season.

=== Kerala Blasters FC (2024) ===
Just days after getting sacked by Odense Boldklub, on 7 June 2024, Wesström was appointed as the assistant coach of the Indian Super League club Kerala Blasters FC. He was appointed as the assistant coach under Mikael Stahre, with whom he had worked at AIK and Väsby United. Wesström joined the Indian club as one of the assistant coaches under Stahre, alongside the Indian assistant coach T. G. Purushothaman.

On 16 December 2024, he resigned from his post along with the head coach due to club's poor performance.

== Managerial statistics ==
As of match played 9 August 2024

Managerial record by team and tenure
| Team | Nat | From | To | Record | | | | | | | | Ref. |
| Team | Nat | From | To | G | W | D | L | GF | GA | GD | Win % | Ref. |
|---|---|---|---|---|---|---|---|---|---|---|---|---|
| AIK (caretaker) | (Belgium) | 26 April 2010 | 22 June 2010 | 7 | 3 | 0 | 4 | 30 | 32 | −2 | 42.86 | |
| Total | | | | 7 | 3 | 0 | 4 | 30 | 32 | −2 | 42.86 | |

== Honours ==
=== Sporting director ===
AIK

- Allsvenskan: 2009
- Svenska Cupen: 2009
- Supercupen: 2010
