= Martin Kayongo-Mutumba =

Footballer (born 1985)

- Kayongo-Mutumba with AIK in 2013

Personal information
- Full name: Martin Kayongo-Mutumba
- Date of birth: 15 June 1985 (age 41)
- Place of birth: Solna, Sweden
- Height: 1.77 m (5 ft 10 in)
- Position: Winger

Youth career
- 1990–1998: Vasalunds IF
- 1998–2002: AIK

Senior career*
Years	Team	Apps	(Gls)
2002–2003	AIK	10	(0)
2004	FC Café Opera	0	(0)
2005–2007	Inter Turku	58	(7)
2008	Väsby United	29	(4)
2009–2010	AIK	37	(3)
2010–2011	Videoton FC	3	(0)
2011–2014	AIK	72	(6)
2014	Çaykur Rizespor	0	(0)
2014–2015	Orduspor	5	(0)
2015	Rah Ahan	7	(1)
2015	IF Brommapojkarna	11	(0)
2016–2017	Örgryte IS	22	(4)
2018	Syrianska FC	7	(1)

International career
2002	Sweden U17	4	(0)
2003	Sweden U19	7	(3)
2012–2014	Uganda	7	(0)
- * Club domestic league appearances and goals

Martin Kayongo-Mutumba (born Martin Mutumba, 15 June 1985) is a footballer who plays as a winger for Rinkeby United. He is best remembered for his time with AIK, with which he won both Allsvenskan and Svenska Cupen in 2009. Born in Sweden to Ugandan parents, he represented the Sweden U17 and U19 teams before making his full international debut for Uganda in 2012.

== Career ==
=== Early career ===
Mutumba began his career in Vasalunds IF as a young child, and in 1999 he joined AIK, as a youth player. In the fall of 2002 he made his first appearance with the senior squad against Kalmar FF, playing the last five minutes of the game.

In 2004 AIK wanted Mutumba to play with FC Café Opera, a club that would functioned as an AIK feeder club. Unfortunately, Mutumba broke his leg in an indoor tournament he played with some friends before the season had started and he was never able to play any matches for Café Opera. He stated that he lost his interest in football and "started hanging with the wrong crowd". This eventually landed him with a battery and assault charge. A judicial court gave him a second chance and he decided to continue with football.

=== Inter Turku ===
In 2005, AIK sold him to Finnish team FC Inter Turku that played in the Premier Division, Veikkausliiga.

=== Väsby United ===
When the Finnish season ended in the fall of 2007 Mutumba tried out for Spanish La Liga club Deportivo de La Coruña, his old club AIK and Scottish Premier League club Hibernian. Mutumba himself reported that he turned down a deal from Deportivo La Coruña, and British media claimed he signed a short-term contract with Hibernian. In a 2009 interview with Swedish newspaper Aftonbladet he stated that the deal with Deportivo La Coruña fell through due to problems on behalf of his agent, and he explained that they were talking about the development team, Fabril, who play in the Spanish Segunda B division. In the end he signed with Superettan club FC Väsby United, where he had previously been under contract in 2004 when the club was still known as "FC Café Opera“.

=== Return to AIK ===
In November 2008 he signed with AIK again. Following his return to the club, he stated that he was where he wanted to be and that it was highly unlikely that he would move abroad again and that the money offered to him was not going to be decisive. In the last game of the 2009 season AIK beat IFK Göteborg 2–1 in a dramatic title-deciding match, claiming the Allsvenskan championship for the first time in eleven years. In the match 55th minute, Mutumba provided the assist to his teammate Antônio Flávio, who took the "skillful" feed and rifled the equalizer past IFK Gothenburg's goalkeeper. Two days before the final game, Mutumba tattooed in "AIK GULD (Gold) 2LAX9 (2009, LAX is slang for thousand) on his chest.

AIK came off to a bad start in the 2010 season, performing badly despite being crowned champions only a few months earlier. The club was nearing a relegation battle due to these bad showings. Manager Mikael Stahre left for Panionios GSS and the team came under heavy criticism for its poor performances.

=== Videoton ===
On 28 June 2010, media reported that the Hungarian club of Videoton FC had bought both Bojan Djordjic and Martin Mutumba. The director of the Hungarian club compared Djordjic to Roberto Baggio and Mutumba to Ronaldinho. The transfer led to many speculations in media, especially since AIK had appointed the Scottish manager Alex Miller only a couple of days before the transfer were made. The players claimed that it was Mr. Miller’s decision to let the players go, but the organization of AIK claimed that they got such a good offer that they couldn't refuse to sell.

=== Second return to AIK ===
In 2011, Mutumba was signed by AIK for the third time, agreeing on a three-year deal with the club.

=== Çaykur Rizespor ===
On 5 January 2014, Çaykur Rizespor announced that Mutumba signed with them for 2.5 years.

=== Rah Ahan ===
On 3 March 2015, he joined Persian Gulf Pro League club Rah Ahan.

== Personal life ==
When he originally signed on with AIK, still a teenager, his father quit his job and the young Mutumba provided the family with the only income they had. When the club let him go, the family quickly found themselves in economic hardship.

In 2003, Mutumba collaborated on the book "Svartskallar – Så funkar vi" (roughly: "Wogs – How we work") where 11 young people from multicultural and minority backgrounds talk about what it is like to be of immigrant background in modern Swedish society.

Mutumba enjoys reggae, rap music and samba music, and has released his own music under the moniker M9. He has a tattoo on his left temple that says "R-BY", a tribute to Rinkeby, the suburb in Stockholm where he grew up and still resides. Days before winning the deciding final game of the 2009 season he tattooed "A.I.K GULD 2LAX9" (AIK league champions 2009) across his chest.

He is second cousin with former footballer Moses Nsubuga who played for IF Elfsborg and lost his left leg in a car accident 1997. In January 2012, Mutumba got a Ugandan passport and was summoned in the Uganda national team squad that faced Congo Brazzaville in the Africa Cup of Nations (2013) qualifiers. However, he didn't play spending all the 90 minutes on bench. Later in June that year, Mutumba made his debut in the Uganda national team that played an away World Cup (2014) qualifier with Angola on 3 June 2012.

After his active time as a footballer, Martin Mutumba has become a valued lecturer. Based on his own life journey, he lectures on motivation, overcoming obstacles and the importance of taking chances in life.

== Career statistics ==
=== Club ===
Appearances and goals by club, season and competition
Club	Season	League			Cup		Europe		Total	
Club	Season	Division	Apps	Goals	Apps	Goals	Apps	Goals	Apps	Goals
AIK	2002	Allsvenskan	1	0	0	0	0	0	1	0
AIK	2003	Allsvenskan	9	0	0	0	0	0	9	0
AIK	Total		10	0	0	0	0	0	10	0
FC Café Opera (loan)	2004	Superettan	0	0	0	0	0	0	0	0
Inter Turku	2005	Veikkausliiga	16	2	0	0	0	0	16	2
Inter Turku	2006	Veikkausliiga	17	1	0	0	0	0	17	1
Inter Turku	2007	Veikkausliiga	25	4	0	0	0	0	25	4
Inter Turku	Total		58	7	0	0	0	0	58	7
Väsby United	2008	Superettan	29	4	0	0	0	0	29	4
AIK	2009	Allsvenskan	24	3	5	1	0	0	29	4
AIK	2010	Allsvenskan	13	0	1	0	0	0	14	0
AIK	Total		37	7	6	1	0	0	43	4
Videoton FC	2010–11	Nemzeti Bajnokság I	3	0	0	0	0	0	3	0
AIK	2011	Allsvenskan	28	3	1	0	0	0	29	3
AIK	2012	Allsvenskan	25	2	1	0	9	0	35	2
AIK	Total		53	5	2	0	9	0	64	5
Çaykur Rizespor	2014–15	Süper Lig	0	0	0	0	0	0	0	0
Rah Ahan	2014–15	Pro League	7	1	0	0	0	0	7	1
Brommapojkarna	2015	Superettan	11	0			0	0	11	0
Örgryte IS	2016	Superettan	7	2	1	0	0	0	8	2
Örgryte IS	2017	Superettan	15	2	0	0	0	0	15	2
Örgryte IS	Total		22	4	1	0	0	0	23	4
Syrianska	2018	Division 1 Norra	17	3	0	0	0	0	17	3
Career total			247	27	9	1	9	0	266	28

=== International ===
Appearances and goals by national team and year
National team	Year	Apps	Goals
Uganda	2012	2	0
Uganda	2013	4	0
Uganda	2014	1	0
Total		7	0

== Honours ==
AIK

- Allsvenskan: 2009
- Svenska Cupen: 2009
- Supercupen: 2010
