= Yussuf Saleh =

Ethiopian footballer

Personal information
- Full name: Yussuf Yassin Saleh
- Date of birth: 22 March 1984 (age 42)
- Place of birth: Solna, Sweden
- Height: 1.77 m (5 ft 10 in)
- Position: Left winger

Team information
- Current team: Rinkeby United

Youth career
- Råsunda IS
- AIK
- FC Inter Orhoy

Senior career*
Years	Team	Apps	(Gls)
2006–2007	Hässelby SK FF	32	(10)
2007–2008	Vasalund IF	28	(11)
2008	→ Ciudad de Murcia (loan)	30	(10)
2008–2011	AIK	14	(0)
2010–2011	→ Syrianska FC (loan)	46	(3)
2012	Syrianska FC	24	(1)
2013	FC Tobol	10	(1)
2014	Syrianska FC	10	(2)
2014–2015	IK Sirius	3	(0)
2015	AFC United	14	(1)
2017–2018	Vasalund IF	17	(4)
2019	FOC Farsta	10	(1)
2019–2021	Hallonbergens IF		
2022–	Rinkeby United		

International career
2012–2014	Ethiopia	16	(2)
- * Club domestic league appearances and goals as of 20:10, 14 June 2019 (UTC)

Yussuf Yassin Saleh (Amharic: ዩሱፍ ያሲን ሳላህ; born 22 March 1984) is an Ethiopian footballer who plays as a left winger for Rinkeby United.

Yussuf was originally an attacking midfielder but later a left-winger. He previously played for Hässelby SK FF, Vasalund IF, Ciudad de Murcia and AIK.

== Career ==
Yussuf was playing in the Swedish third tier with Vasalund IF when he was signed by Stockholm club AIK in the summer of 2008. He made his Allsvenskan debut against IF Elfsborg on 10 August that same year. Yussuf became Swedish champion with AIK in 2009, but the following year he was sent out on loan to nearby Superettan club Syrianska FC because he needed to play more games to continue his development. During his loan, Yussuf helped the club get promoted to Allsvenskan for the first time ever and the next year he returned on loan to play with them again, this time at the highest level of the Swedish football league system. After his contract with AIK expired, he signed a one-year deal with Syrianska for the 2012 season. In 2013, he completed a transfer to Kazakhstan side FC Tobol.On 1 August 2017, he rejoined his old club Vasalund IF.

=== International career ===
Yussuf was born in Sweden to Ethiopian parents, and, in 2012, he was called in to represent Ethiopia in the 2012 edition of CECAFA hosted in Uganda. He was named in the Ethiopian squad for the 2013 Africa Cup of Nations.

== Honours ==
=== AIK ===
- Allsvenskan: 2009
- Svenska Cupen: 2009
- Supercupen: 2010
