= Bojan Djordjic =

Swedish footballer (born 1982)

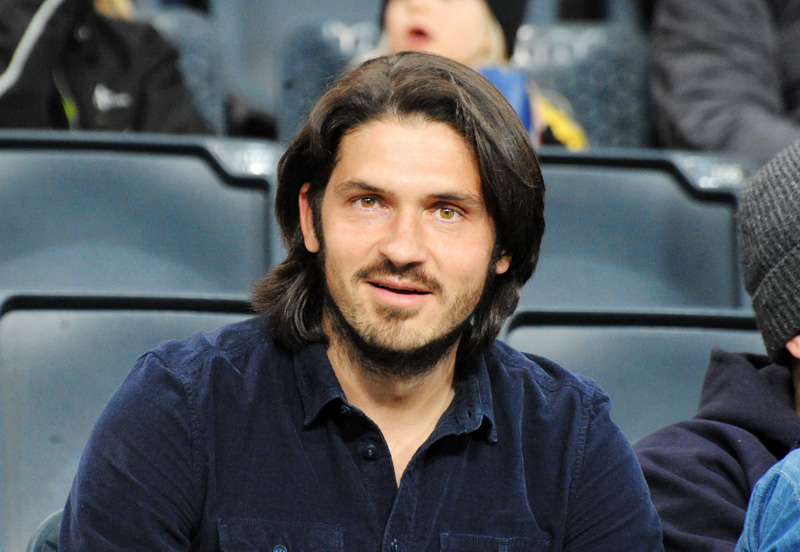
- Djordjic in March 2013

Personal information
- Full name: Bojan Djordjic
- Date of birth: 6 February 1982 (age 44)
- Place of birth: Belgrade, SFR Yugoslavia
- Height: 1.83 m (6 ft 0 in)
- Position: Winger

Youth career
- 1997–1999: Brommapojkarna
- 1999–2001: Manchester United

Senior career*
Years	Team	Apps	(Gls)
1997–1999	Brommapojkarna	6	(0)
1999–2005	Manchester United	1	(0)
2001–2002	→ Sheffield Wednesday (loan)	5	(0)
2002–2003	→ AGF (loan)	26	(0)
2003–2004	→ Red Star Belgrade (loan)	24	(1)
2005	Rangers	4	(0)
2005–2007	Plymouth Argyle	44	(4)
2008–2010	AIK	43	(0)
2010–2011	Videoton	4	(0)
2010–2011	→ Videoton II	3	(1)
2011–2012	Blackpool	0	(0)
2012	Royal Antwerp	5	(0)
2012–2013	Brommapojkarna	25	(0)
2014	Vasalund	13	(0)
2014–2015	Chennaiyin	11	(0)
Total		215	(6)

International career
1998–1999	Sweden U17	28	(2)
2000	Sweden U19	7	(0)
2001–2003	Sweden U21	9	(1)
- * Club domestic league appearances and goals as of 10:57, 24 November 2014 (UTC)

Bojan Djordjic (Serbian Cyrillic: Бојан Ђорђић, Bojan Đorđić; Serbian pronunciation: [ˈbo.jan ˈdʑɔr.dʑitɕ]; born 6 February 1982) is a Swedish former professional footballer who played as a winger.

Starting off his career with IF Brommapojkarna in the late 1990s, Djordjic soon joined Manchester United, with which he was named the 1999–2000 Jimmy Murphy Young Player of the Year, and AIK, with which he won the 2009 Allsvenskan and 2009 Svenska Cupen. He represented clubs in Sweden, England, Denmark, Serbia, Scotland, Hungary and Belgium before finishing his career with Chennaiyin in the Indian Super League in 2015.

Although born in the former Yugoslavia, Djordjic was a youth international for Sweden between 1998 and 2003, representing the Swedish U17s, U19s and U21s a combined total of 44 times, scoring three goals.

== Club career ==
=== Early career and Manchester United ===
Born in Belgrade, SFR Yugoslavia to professional footballer Ranko Đorđić, Bojan started his career at IF Brommapojkarna before moving to Manchester United in 1999 as a youth player. Although considered a budding talent, having been awarded the club's Jimmy Murphy Player of the Year Award at the age of 18, he only made two competitive appearances for the club. He also scored with a chip in a 2–0 win against Celtic in Tom Boyd's testimonial at Celtic Park on 15 May 2001, after coming on as a substitute for Ryan Giggs.

He was loaned to Sheffield Wednesday, Aarhus GF and Red Star Belgrade, where he scored his first senior goal against Odense BK in the 2003–04 UEFA Cup.

=== Rangers ===
He signed for Rangers in Scotland in January 2005 on a free transfer. On 9 January 2005 he made his full debut against Celtic in the Scottish Cup. However, injuries limited his chances to establish himself in the first team at Ibrox Stadium.

=== Plymouth Argyle ===
Djordjic moved to Plymouth Argyle on at the end of the 2004–05 season having made four league appearances during Rangers title winning campaign. Other club interested in the winger was Stockholm-based side AIK, the club that Djordjic supports.

On 24 August 2006, after spending just over a season at Plymouth, Djordjic was placed on the transfer list by manager Ian Holloway as a result of his sometimes lax attitude towards the team when playing and training. He was promised the opportunity to get back into the first team once his attitude improved.

Djordjic finally returned to the starting lineup after he scored eight goals in five games for the reserves and after exactly a three-month absence, on 18 November 2006, scoring in the fifth minute in a 1–1 away draw at Southend United. He was removed from the transfer list the following week, and went on to score in the next two consecutive games (Leeds United and Luton Town).

=== AIK ===
On 19 October 2007, Djordjic's contract with Plymouth Argylewas terminated by mutual consent due to lack of first-team opportunities. On 13 November, it was officially announced he had signed a two-year deal with Swedish club AIK. His first season for the club has not been what he was hoping for with several injuries and on 13 September 2008 he was injured once again and missed the remaining eight matches of the season. His first match for AIK was against Kalmar FF on 30 March 2008 in the first game of the 2008 season. During the 2009 transfer season, Djordjic was approached by Maccabi Haifa which offering him a contract, however Djordjic rejected saying that he wanted to stay with the club in his heart AIK. Scoring 1 goal and providing 6 assists in all competitions during the 2009 season, he helped AIK win the 2009 Allsvenskan.

Due to the start of the season of 2010, AIK was underperforming as defending champions. This led that club was struggling to avoid relegation. The coach Mikael Stahre left for Panionios and much criticism was aimed at the team's bad performances.

=== Videoton ===
On 28 June media reported that the Hungarian club Videoton had bought both Djordjic and Martin Mutumba. The director of the Hungarian club compared Djordjic with Roberto Baggio and Mutumba was compared with Ronaldinho. The transfer led to many speculations in media, especially since AIK had appointed the Scottish manager Alex Miller only a couple of days before the transfer were made. The players claimed that it was Mr. Millers decision to let the players go, but the organization of AIK claimed that they got such a good offer that they could not refuse to sell. One year later, he terminated his contract that would have expired 2013.

=== Blackpool ===
Djordjic joined Blackpool on a two-year contract in June 2011, reuniting him with manager Holloway. "Ollie (Ian Holloway) is one of the few managers to get the best out of me and I always thought about that," he said. "It's a big step when you're 29 to come back to English football to a club that's just been relegated from the Premier League." His salary was believed to be a minimum of around £160,000 annually, before bonuses. He cancelled his contract with Blackpool by mutual consent on 9 January 2012.

=== Royal Antwerp ===
On 4 February 2012, he signed a short-term contract with the Belgian Second Division club Royal Antwerp.

=== Return to Sweden ===
In June 2012, Djordjic returned to his boyhood club Brommapojkarna. in January 2014, he signed with the Division 1 Norra club Vasalunds IF.

=== Chennaiyin ===
On 21 August 2014, Djordjic was a picked in the inaugural ISL International Draft, signing for Indian Super League side Chennaiyin. Djordjic served as the team captain during his time at the club.

== International career ==
Djordjic was a part of Sweden's squad at the 1999 UEFA European Under-16 Championship. He played 9 games for the Sweden U21 team, but was often overlooked by the then-manager Torbjörn Nilsson.

== Post-playing ==
=== Television personality ===
==== Viaplay ====
From the mid 2010s, Djordjic began working as a football pundit for Viaplay sports channels in Sweden.

In late March 2023, Djordjic's post-match interview with the Sweden national team head coach Janne Andersson following a 5–0 Euro 2024 qualifier win by Sweden over Azerbaijan in Solna turned into a heated exchange that further devolved into Andersson belittling Djordjic's football expertise as well as appearing to question his loyalty to the country of Sweden. Annoyed over Djordjic's question about the lack of playing time given to the forward Jesper Karlsson (who hadn't seen any action several days earlier in Sweden's qualifier loss to Belgium and who despite being brought on for only the last eight minutes of regulation versus Azerbaijan still managed to score a goal), Andersson retorted angrily about "being sick of this nonsense" before twice dismissing Djordjic's questions about Karlsson as "whining". Djordjic came back with an observation that the national side coach has a duty to publicly answer these kinds of questions without becoming defensive due to "representing 10 million people" prompting by now very agitated Andersson to angrily ask Djordjic "and what do you represent?", which Djordjic took as a reference to Djordjic not being Swedish-born or of Swedish ethnicity. Several minutes later, at the official post-match press conference, Andersson was asked by reporters about his on-camera outburst at Djordjic; his answer was that Djordjic's ethnicity shouldn't be brought into this, adding "I may have expressed myself badly, but don't mix it up, than I'll be really pissed off" and "I can apologize if I said something bad". The next day, the Swedish Football Association called another press conference, specifically for Andersson to address his incident with Djordjic; Andersson stated: "My head stopped. Anyone who knows me knows that I hate all forms of racism. I apologize profusely if he interpreted it that way, but that's not who I am" before adding that he has reached out to Djordjic for a conversation. Djordjic's employer Viaplay issued a press release later the same day in which Djordjic stated that he stands by his line of questioning with Andersson as well as being willing to "forgive [Andersson] but not forget"; Viaplay media company also expressed public support for their employee. Some Swedish journalists criticized Djordjic for the way he conducted the post-match interview.

==== MUTV ====
Djordjic is, as of 2021, a pundit on Manchester United's television station, MUTV.

== Honours ==
Red Star Belgrade

- First League of Serbia and Montenegro: 2003–04
- Serbia and Montenegro Cup: 2003–04

Rangers

- Scottish Premier League: 2004–05

AIK

- Allsvenskan: 2009
- Svenska Cupen: 2009
- Svenska Supercupen: 2010

Videoton

- Nemzeti Bajnokság I: 2010–11

Individual

- Jimmy Murphy Young Player of the Year: 1999–2000
