= Viktor Lundberg =

Swedish footballer

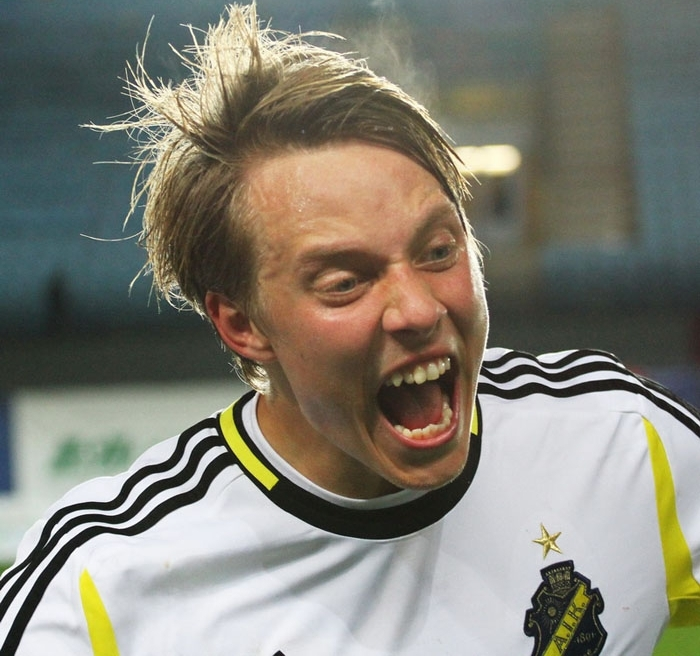

Personal information
- Date of birth: 4 March 1991 (age 35)
- Place of birth: Solna, Sweden
- Height: 1.86 m (6 ft 1 in)
- Position: Forward

Team information
- Current team: Örgryte IS (transition coach)

Youth career
- 1995–2007: AIK

Senior career*
Years	Team	Apps	(Gls)
2008	Väsby United	27	(1)
2009–2013	AIK	86	(12)
2009	→ Väsby United (loan)	12	(2)
2013–2017	Randers FC	119	(24)
2017–2018	Marítimo	1	(0)
2018–2020	BK Häcken	74	(9)
2021–2022	Helsingborg	27	(3)
2022–2024	Örgryte IS	52	(6)

International career
2006–2008	Sweden U17	14	(4)
2008–2010	Sweden U19	13	(1)
2011	Sweden U21	2	(0)

Managerial career
- 2025–: Örgryte IS (transition coach)
- * Club domestic league appearances and goals

Viktor Lundberg (born 4 March 1991) is a Swedish former footballer who played as a forward. He is currently working as a transition coach at Örgryte IS.

== Career ==
=== AIK ===
Viktor came through AIK's youth ranks from an early age. In 2008, he was placed in AIK's feeder club FC Väsby United to get senior team experience.

==== 2009 ====
In March 2009 he rejoined AIK but this time to play with the first team. His debut was against fellow Stockholm team IF Brommapojkarna, in which he scored his first goal. He took place in the starting eleven and it took less than two minutes until he scored. He made a total of six appearances for AIK in the league this year, and one appearance in the Swedish Cup. For the rest of 2009 he was once again loaned out to Väsby United, where he made two goals in 12 appearances.

==== 2010 ====
During 2010 he made his big breakthrough in AIK. Even though he was just nineteen years old, he managed to make 22 appearances, in 12 of these he was in the starting-eleven. In these appearances he managed to make four goals and one assist. On 21 July he made his first European-staged game, coming on as a substitute against Jeunesse Esch in the qualifying stage of the UEFA Champions League.

==== 2011 ====
In 2011, AIK made a very good season and finished second in Allsvenskan. The season wasn't equally good for Lundberg, even though he managed to make 24 appearances. During a few weeks he was troubled by an injury, and only managed to score two goals during the season.

==== 2012 ====
During 2012, Lundberg made a much better season then the previous. In Allsvenskan he managed to make five goals and five assist, in 27 appearances. In round two of the Swedish Cup, he made the game-winning goal against Torslanda IK, therefore qualifying AIK for the group stage of the cup. He also had great success in the UEFA Europa League, making a total of 11 appearances, during which he managed to score on two occasions; against polish side Lech Poznań, and Icelandic side FH. He also made three assist during the European campaign.

=== Randers ===
In the summer of 2013, Lundberg transferred to the Danish club Randers FC for an undisclosed fee from Swedish side AIK Fotboll. He left the club in the summer of 2017.

=== Marítimo ===
On 29 June 2017, Lundberg signed a three years contract with Marítimo

=== BK Häcken ===
Lundberg was acquired by BK Häcken on a 3-year contract, making his second stint in Allsvenskan

=== Helsingborgs IF ===
On 11 February 2021, Lundberg signed a three-year contract with Helsingborg.

== Coaching career ==
After the 2024 season, Örgryte IS confirmed that Lundberg would not continue as a player—having chosen to hang up his boots—but would remain at the club as a transition coach.

== Career statistics ==
Club	Season	Division	League			Cup			Europe			Total		
Club	Season	Division	Apps	Goals	Assists	Apps	Goals	Assists	Apps	Goals	Assists	Apps	Goals	Assists
Väsby United	2008	Superettan	27	1	1	—			—			27	1	1
AIK	2009	Allsvenskan	6	1	0	1	1	0	—			7	2	0
Väsby United (loan)	2009	Superettan	12	2	1	—			—			12	2	1
AIK	2010	Allsvenskan	22	4	1	2	0	0	5	0	0	29	4	1
AIK	2011	Allsvenskan	24	2	0	—			—			24	2	0
AIK	2012	Allsvenskan	27	5	5	2	1	0	11	2	3	38	8	8
AIK	2013	Allsvenskan	7	0	0	2	0	0	—			9	0	0
Randers FC	2013-14	Superliga	29	4	2	1	0	0	1	0	0	31	4	2
Career Total			154	19	10	8	2	0	17	2	3	179	23	13

== Honours ==
AIK

- Allsvenskan: 2009
- Svenska Cupen: 2009
- Svenska Supercupen: 2010
