= Saihou Jagne =

Gambian professional footballer (born 1986)

Personal information
- Full name: Saihou Jagne
- Date of birth: 10 October 1986 (age 40)
- Place of birth: Banjul, Gambia
- Height: 1.82 m (6 ft 0 in)
- Position: Striker

Senior career*
Years	Team	Apps	(Gls)
–2007	Väsby United	?	(24)
2006	→ Valsta Syrianska (loan)	?	(3)
2008–2010	AIK	40	(7)
2008	→ Väsby United	3	(1)
2010	→ GIF Sundsvall (loan)	2	(0)
2011	Brommapojkarna	13	(2)
2012	IFK Mariehamn	25	(5)
2013	→ AFC United	5	(1)
2013	→ Kista Galaxy		
2014	IF Birkebeineren		
2014–2015	Ånge		
2015	Brumunddal	12	(10)
2016–2017	HamKam	5	(2)
2017	Fateh Hyderabad	5	(4)
2017	Brattvåg IL		
2017–2018	Shillong Lajong	8	(2)
- * Club domestic league appearances and goals as of 6 March 2018

Saihou Jagne (French pronunciation: [sɛ.u ʒaɲ], born on 10 October 1986) is a Gambian professional footballer who plays as a striker and last played for Shillong Lajong FC in the I-League. His nickname, CH (IPA: [ˈsêːhoː]), is an approximate Swedish pronunciation spelling of his given name. He also holds Swedish passport.

== Career ==
Just a few weeks after signing with AIK, Turkish club Gaziantepspor showed interest in the young striker, making a bid up to €200,000.

He made his debut for AIK on 30 March 2008 in the first match of the new season as a substitute at Råsunda against Kalmar FF in a match that ended 0–0.

Jagne did not score once in the first months of his career at the club but when the team faced Kalmar FF for the second time of the season on 4 August 2008 he scored both goals for AIK in a game that ended 3–2 to Kalmar FF at Fredriksskans.

On 24 September he was substituted in the derby against arch-rivals Djurgårdens IF and scored the equaliser in stoppage time.

On 17 July 2014, it was announced that he had sign a contract with Ånge IF. He returned to Norway and Brumunddal in July 2015.

In May 2017 he joined the Indian club Fateh Hyderabad founded just two years ago. Jagne signed on a deal that would see him stay at the second-tier side until after the summer with an option to extend. He made his debut on 9 May 2017 in the home match of Fateh against Kenkre and scored a goal in the 19th minute.

He moved to Indian side Shillong Lajong F.C. in 2017.

== Honours ==
AIK

- Allsvenskan: 2009
- Svenska Cupen: 2009
- Supercupen: 2010
