= Walid Atta =

Saudi-born Ethiopian footballer

Walid "Tatta" Atta ዋሊድ አታ
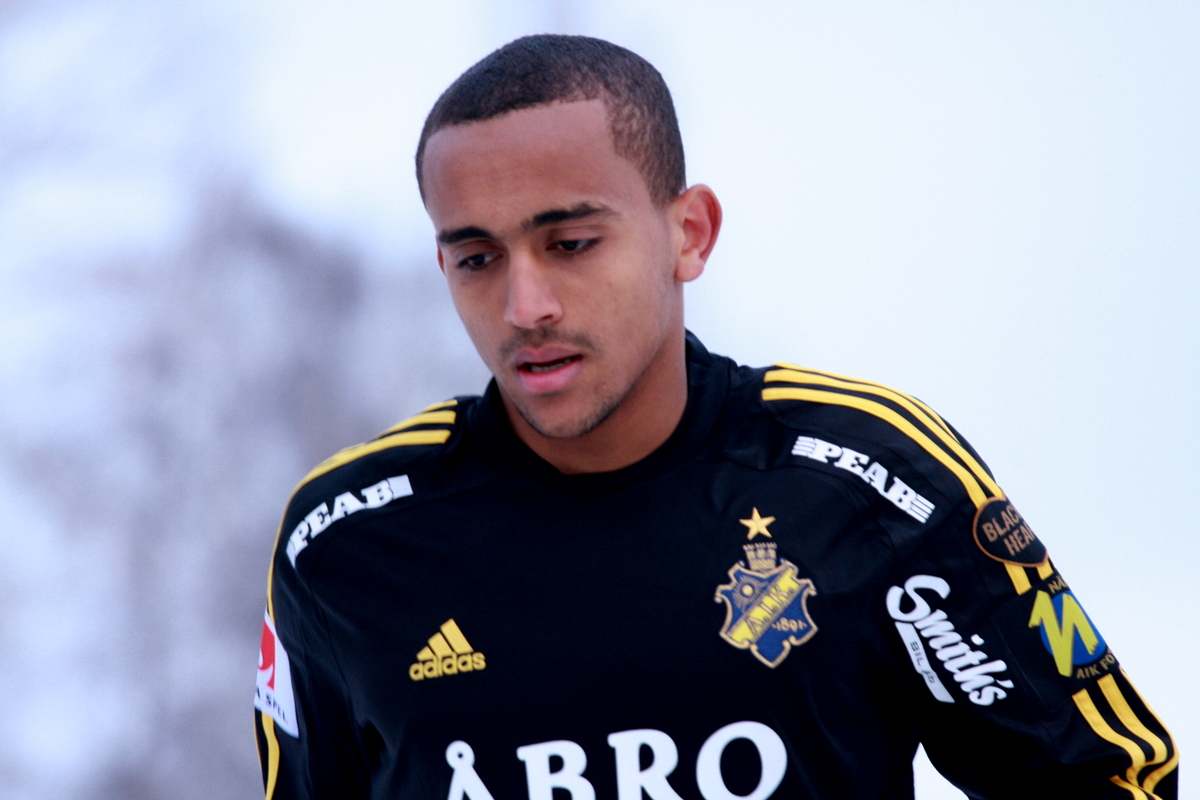
- Walid Atta playing for AIK

Personal information
- Date of birth: 28 August 1986 (age 40)
- Place of birth: Riyadh, Saudi Arabia
- Height: 1.87 m (6 ft 2 in)
- Position: Centre back

Team information
- Current team: Hittarps IK

Youth career
- IF Stendy
- Rannebergens IF
- Gunnilse

Senior career*
Years	Team	Apps	(Gls)
2004–2006	Gunnilse		
2006–2007	Väsby United	11	(0)
2008–2010	AIK	32	(1)
2008	→ Väsby United (loan)	5	(1)
2010–2011	Lokomotiva	8	(0)
2011–2012	Dinamo Zagreb	0	(0)
2012–2014	Helsingborgs IF	31	(6)
2014–2015	BK Häcken	26	(0)
2015	Gençlerbirliği	4	(0)
2016	Östersunds FK	20	(2)
2017	Sogndal	1	(0)
2017	Najran SC		
2017	Khaleej FC		
2019–	Hittarps IK		

International career
2008–2009	Sweden U21	3	(0)
2014–	Ethiopia	4	(0)
- * Club domestic league appearances and goals as of 2 August 2017

Walid "Tatta" Atta (Arabic: وليد عطا, romanized: Walīd 'Aṭā, Amharic: ዋሊድ አታ; born 28 August 1986) is an Ethiopian footballer who plays as a centre back for Hittarps IK.

== Career ==
=== AIK ===
In January 2008, Atta joined Swedish top-division side AIK, but was immediately loaned back to Väsby. He made his first appearance for his new club on 10 April 2008 against GIF Sundsvall at Råsunda Stadium, playing the full game in defence. In the summer of 2010, Atta's situation at AIK came in doubt when he turned down a contract extension with the club. Together with his agent, he cut off the negotiations with AIK, and stated that he wanted to await bids from clubs outside of Sweden. This angered the AIK supporters, and in the 2–1 win against IF Brommapojkarna, parts of the crowd openly showed their disappointment. Some organized supporters demanded Atta to be disbanded from playing in AIK until he signed a new deal with the club. The club board followed the demands and stopped Atta from participate in AIK's Europa League qualification game against PFC Levski Sofia. In 2010, Atta was sold to Croatian First Division side NK Lokomotiva.

=== Dinamo Zagreb ===
After one season in Lokomotiva, he signed a 5-year contract with Croatian giants Dinamo Zagreb. However, his time at Dinamo was not prosperous, making no appearances apart from a friendly against GOŠK Gabela. In January 2012, the contract was terminated by mutual consent and Atta became a free agent.

=== Helsingborgs IF ===
Soon after becoming a free agent, Atta was signed by Allsvenskan side Helsingborgs IF. He has since become a regular in the starting eleven.

=== BK Häcken ===
On 6 March 2014 Atta signed with BK Häcken prior to start of the 2014 Allsvenskan campaign.

=== Hittarps IK ===
On 13 February 2019, Atta joined Hittarps IK.

== International ==
In 2008, Atta also became a member of the Swedish U-21 team, making his debut in a friendly against Ukraine on 5 February 2008, in Alcanena, Portugal. He played a total of 3 matches for the Swedish U-21 team. In October 2013 he decided to represent Ethiopia at senior level. Atta was supposed to make his debut against Nigeria in the African play-offs for the World Cup in Brazil, but the needed papers did not arrive in time. He finally made his debut in a qualifiers match for the 2015 CAF against Mali in Addis Ababa. Ethiopia lost that match in Addis Ababa but won the second leg in Mali. Walid played in both these matches.

== Honours ==
AIK

- Allsvenskan: 2009
- Svenska Cupen: 2009
- Svenska Supercupen: 2010

Helsingborgs IF

- Svenska Supercupen: 2012
