= Kyriakos Stamatopoulos =

Greek-Canadian soccer player and coach

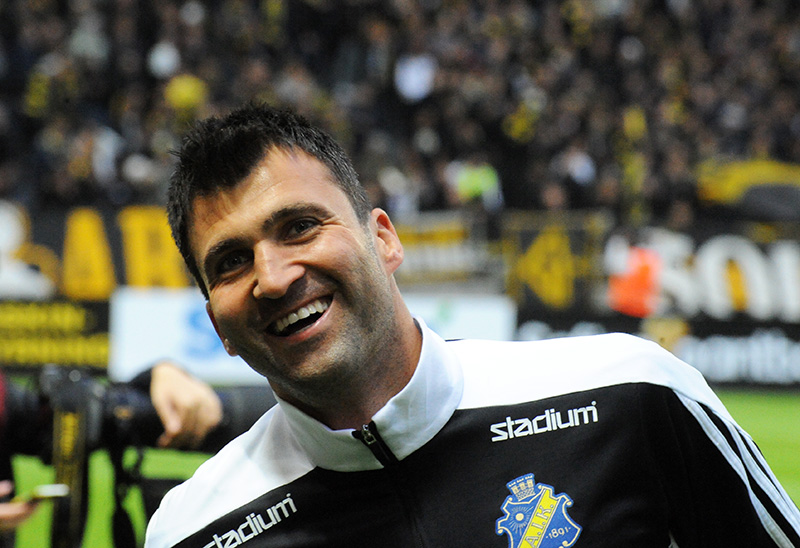
- Stamatopoulos in 2015

Personal information
- Date of birth: 28 August 1979 (age 47)
- Place of birth: Kalamata, Greece
- Height: 1.88 m (6 ft 2 in)
- Position: Goalkeeper

Team information
- Current team: AIK (goalkeeper coach)

Youth career
- Scarborough Azzurri

Senior career*
| Years | Team | Apps | (Gls) |
| 1999–2002 | Kalamata | 13 | (0) |
| 2003–2004 | Enköpings SK | 40 | (0) |
| 2005 | Boden | 30 | (0) |
| 2006–2010 | Tromsø | 17 | (0) |
| 2007 | → Toronto FC (loan) | 12 | (0) |
| 2009 | → Lyn (loan) | 6 | (0) |
| 2009 | → Fredrikstad (loan) | 11 | (0) |
| 2010 | → AIK (loan) | 4 | (0) |
| 2011– | AIK | 50 | (0) |
| Total | | 183 | (0) |

International career
| 2001 | Canada U23 | 2 | (0) |
| 2001–2016 | Canada | 21 | (0) |

Managerial career
- 2018–: AIK (goalkeeping coach)
Medal record
Representing Canada
Men's soccer
CONCACAF Gold Cup
| Third place | 2002 United States |
- * Club domestic league appearances and goals

Kyriakos Stamatopoulos (born 28 August 1979) is a Greek Canadian former professional soccer goalkeeper who is the head goalkeeper coach for AIK. In addition to his role as goalkeeping coach, he continues to be registered as a player on the roster, dressing as the substitute goalkeeper on the bench when needed.

He is nicknamed "Stam" (/stæm/) and he is also often referred to as Kenny Stamatopoulos.

== Early life ==
Stamatopoulos moved with his family from Greece to Ontario when he was a small child. He started playing hockey at the age of 2 in Canada and only picked up soccer at the age of 13.

== Club career ==
=== Sweden ===
Stamatopoulos' clubs were relegated every year he played with them in Sweden. First Enköping twice in a row, then Boden while he was on loan there. His relegation-run did not end before he moved to Norway.

=== Tromsø ===
His career at Tromsø got off to a rough start, after he was given a two-match suspension for his involvement in a group fight, which he described as "a little hockey brawl" that occurred during his debut match against Molde. He became a fan favourite as a result of this incident.

=== On loan ===
==== Toronto FC ====
On 3 August 2007, it was announced that Canada's Toronto FC head coach Mo Johnston had loaned Stamatopoulos in the middle of their "keeper crisis". He made his debut against Los Angeles Galaxy on 5 August.

==== Lyn ====
In April 2009, Stamatopoulos was loaned out from Tromsø to Lyn.

==== Fredrikstad ====
On 20 July 2009, it was announced that Stamatopoulos joined Fredrikstad on loan for the rest of the season. Stamatopoulos will join the club 1 August, and make his debut for Fredrikstad 2 August, at home against Viking.

==== AIK ====
Stamatopoulos signed a season-long loan deal with the reigning Swedish champions on 6 March 2010. AIK's goalkeeper Nicklas Bergh became injured during the pre-season, leaving the team with only one goalkeeper. Stamatopoulos made his debut with the club in the quarterfinal of Svenska Cupen in July 2010 against Helsingborgs IF. He only let in one goal in the 1–1 draw, but AIK lost in the penalty shootout.

He became first choice following the tragic death of Ivan Turina in May 2013, but was subsequently the club's second-choice goalkeeper.

On 22 November 2017 AIK announced they prolonged Stamatopoulos's contract until 31 December 2020. In addition, he was appointed as head goalkeeping coach for the club and would continue to be registered as a player in the squad.

== International career ==
Stamatopoulos was a member of the under-23 national team in July 2001 at Jeux de la Francophonie.

He made his senior debut for Canada in a November 2001 friendly match against Malta. His last cap came in 2016. In total, he made 21 caps.

== Career statistics ==
Appearances and goals by club, season and competition
| Season | Club | League | | | Cup | | Total | |
| Season | Club | Division | Apps | Goals | Apps | Goals | Apps | Goals |
|---|---|---|---|---|---|---|---|---|
| Tromsø | 2006 | Tippeligaen | 10 | 0 | 2 | 0 | 12 | 0 |
| Tromsø | 2007 | Tippeligaen | 4 | 0 | 1 | 0 | 5 | 0 |
| Toronto FC | 2007 | MLS | 12 | 0 | 0 | 0 | 12 | 0 |
| Tromsø | 2008 | Tippeligaen | 3 | 0 | 2 | 0 | 5 | 0 |
| Lyn | 2009 | Tippeligaen | 6 | 0 | 2 | 0 | 8 | 0 |
| Fredrikstad | 2009 | Tippeligaen | 11 | 0 | 0 | 0 | 11 | 0 |
| AIK | 2010 | Allsvenskan | 4 | 0 | 1 | 0 | 5 | 0 |
| AIK | 2011 | Allsvenskan | 6 | 0 | 1 | 0 | 7 | 0 |
| AIK | 2012 | Allsvenskan | 6 | 0 | 0 | 0 | 6 | 0 |
| AIK | 2013 | Allsvenskan | 26 | 0 | 1 | 0 | 27 | 0 |
| AIK | 2014 | Allsvenskan | 8 | 0 | 0 | 0 | 8 | 0 |
| AIK | 2015 | Allsvenskan | 3 | 0 | 0 | 0 | 3 | 0 |
| AIK | 2016 | Allsvenskan | 0 | 0 | 0 | 0 | 0 | 0 |
| Career total | | | 99 | 0 | 10 | 0 | 109 | 0 |

== Honours ==
Canada

- CONCACAF Gold Cup: 3rd place, 2002
