= Sebastián Eguren =

Uruguayan footballer (born 1981)

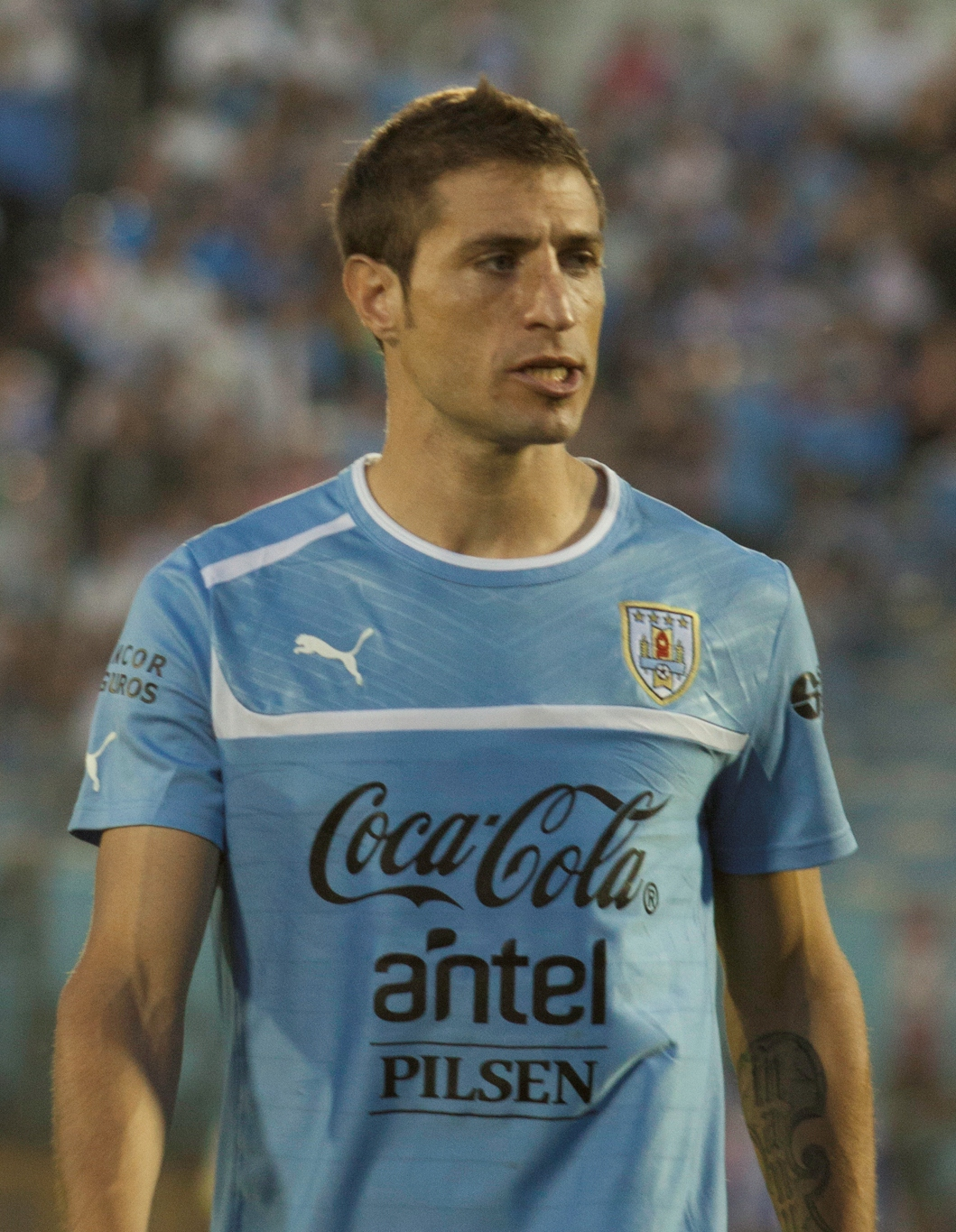
- Eguren with Uruguay in 2013

Personal information
- Full name: Sebastián Eguren Ledesma
- Date of birth: 8 January 1981 (age 45)
- Place of birth: Montevideo, Uruguay
- Height: 1.86 m (6 ft 1 in)
- Position: Midfielder

Senior career*
Years	Team	Apps	(Gls)
1999–2002	Montevideo Wanderers	36	(6)
2002–2003	Danubio	27	(6)
2003–2004	Nacional	39	(5)
2005	Montevideo Wanderers	23	(3)
2005–2006	Rosenborg	23	(0)
2006–2008	Hammarby IF	36	(13)
2008	→ Villarreal (loan)	15	(0)
2008–2010	Villarreal	46	(1)
2010	AIK	7	(0)
2010–2012	Sporting Gijón	49	(3)
2012–2013	Libertad	26	(4)
2013–2014	Palmeiras	17	(2)
2015	Colón	8	(0)
2015–2016	Nacional	11	(0)
Total		363	(43)

International career
2001–2013	Uruguay	54	(7)

Managerial career
- 2016–2017: Nacional (assistant)
- 2018–2019: Al Ahly (assistant)
- 2020–2021: Atenas de San Carlos
- 2021–2022: Chile (assistant)
- 2022: Montevideo City Torque
Medal record
Representing Uruguay
Copa América
Third place	2004 Peru	Team
Winner	2011 Argentina	Team
- * Club domestic league appearances and goals

Sebastián Eguren Ledesma (born 8 January 1981) is a Uruguayan football manager and former player who played mainly as a defensive midfielder.

Eguren started his career with Montevideo Wanderers in 1999, and went on to play professionally in Norway, Sweden, Spain, Paraguay, Brazil, and Argentina before retiring in 2016. He earned 57 caps for Uruguay between 2001 and 2013, representing his country at the 2010 World Cup and two Copa América tournaments, winning the 2011 edition.

From 2016 he worked as a coach, mainly as an assistant to Martín Lasarte.

== Playing career ==
=== Club ===
==== Early years ====
Born in Montevideo, Eguren started his career in native country, playing for Montevideo Wanderers FC (twice) and Club Nacional de Football. With the latter, after the 0–0 Copa Libertadores game against Club Deportivo El Nacional on 12 February 2004, he tested positive for cocaine, being suspended from football for six months. He blamed the coca tea, widely drunk in the Andean countries as a medicine which alleviates the effects of altitude, and got the shortest suspension for this kind of cases (this specific match was played at 2,800 meters above sea level, in Quito).

Eguren arrived at Hammarby IF from Norwegian club Rosenborg BK, on loan during the later part of the 2006 season and, on 5 December 2006, signed a three-year contract with the Swedish side.

==== Villarreal ====
On 30 January 2008, Eguren joined Villarreal CF of La Liga, on loan until the end of the campaign. Almost immediately cast into the starting XI, he partnered Marcos Senna in centre midfield as the Yellow Submarine obtained its best position ever in the top flight by finishing second; in May the Spaniards decided to make the move permanent, and the player penned a three-year deal.

During 2008–09, more of the same: Eguren was, alongside Senna, an everpresent fixture, and the Uruguayan scored his first goal for the club in a 3–3 home draw against Getafe CF (with the Madrid side leading 3–0 at the half-hour mark). He played 32 league matches in his first full season.

In late January 2010, as he had lost his defensive midfielder position to youth graduate Bruno, Eguren was loaned to S.S. Lazio. However, the move was cancelled days later, after the player did not pass his medical.

==== AIK / Sporting Gijón ====
Anxious for playing time in order to secure a spot on the national squad for the 2010 FIFA World Cup, Eguren signed with reigning Swedish champions AIK Fotboll on 19 February 2010. According to their director of football Björn Wesström, the agreement was technically not a loan deal as the player had no contractual obligations with Villarreal until 1 July 2010 – however, he was due to return to Spain since he still had 12 months left of his contract. In early March, it was decided by the club to put the player under police protection, after he was harassed while training by fans of former side Hammarby, a fierce rival to AIK; he usually operated as a defensive midfielder previously, but manager Mikael Stahre preferred using him in an attacking midfielder or deep-lying forward role.

In late July 2010, Eguren returned to Spain but not to Villarreal, signing a three-year contract with fellow league team Sporting de Gijón. He contributed with 19 games and two goals in his second year, but the Asturians suffered relegation.

==== Return to South America ====
In July 2013, Eguren signed a one-and-a-half-year deal with Brazil's Sociedade Esportiva Palmeiras. He confessed that his changing of club happened because he did not have enough playing time at his previous team Club Libertad in Paraguay, where he played second-fiddle to Pablo Guiñazú. He scored twice in 12 Campeonato Brasileiro Série B games as the team from São Paulo won the title, including the equaliser on 23 November as they defeated Ceará Sporting Club 4–1 to lift the trophy.

Having played rarely in Série A for Palmeiras in 2014, Eguren returned to Montevideo Wanderers on a one-year contract the following 27 January. Days later, he was loaned for two years to Club Atlético Colón of the Argentine Primera División. On 25 July, he went back to another former club in his hometown, Nacional.

=== International ===
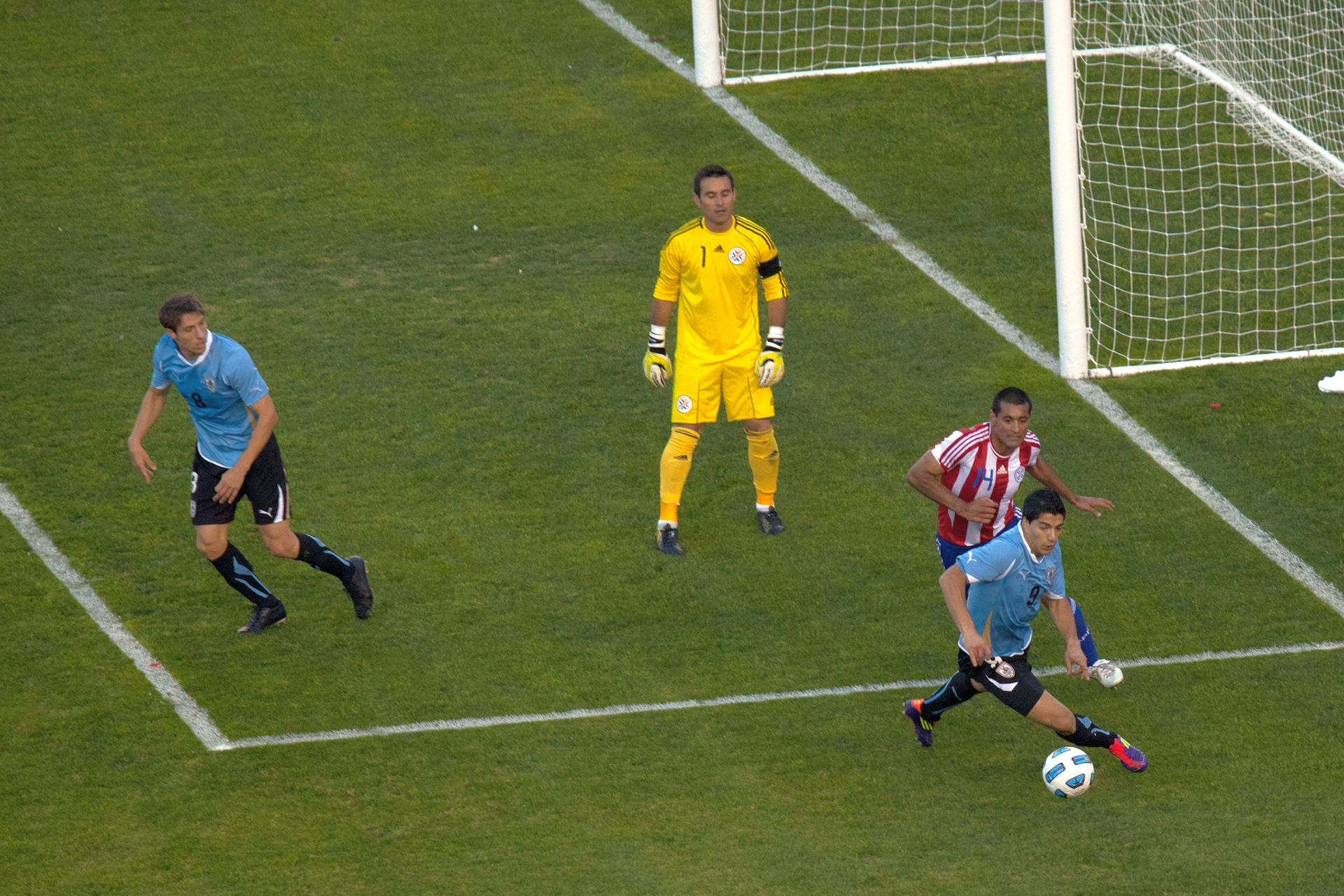
Eguren (sky blue shirt, left) playing against Paraguay in the 2011 Copa América Final

Eguren made his debut for Uruguay during the 2001 Copa América, entering the pitch in the 63rd minute of a 1–0 win against Bolivia, and added a further two appearances in the competition. On 28 May 2008, after a five-year absence, he scored his first goal for the Charrúas, netting in a 2–2 friendly with Norway in Oslo.

On 6 September 2008, Eguren scored his first competitive international goal, heading Diego Forlán's corner kick for the only goal away to Colombia in 2010 FIFA World Cup qualification; he added his only other of the campaign just over a year later, to conclude a 3–1 win in the reverse fixture. He was selected for the finals in South Africa, playing once for the semi-finalists (three minutes in the group stage 0–0 draw against France).

Always as a substitute, Eguren was used regularly in the 2011 Copa América as his nation won its 15th continental tournament. Manager Óscar Tabárez also took him to the 2013 FIFA Confederations Cup in Brazil, where he was part of a completely changed team that beat Tahiti 8–0 in the group stage en route to finishing fourth.

== Coaching career ==
Shortly after retiring as a player, Eguren received his first coaching job in June 2016 when he was hired as assistant to Martín Lasarte at Nacional. He followed him to Al Ahly SC, where they won the Egyptian Premier League in 2018–19.

In September 2020, Eguren was hired at Atenas de San Carlos in his country's second division, having previously been the sporting director. He left the following February, to work beside Lasarte again on the Chile national team.

Lasarte and Eguren quit the Chile national team in April 2022, having failed to qualify for the World Cup in Qatar; the assistant put the blame on the advanced age of the team's star players and the failure to develop replacements for them. Days later, he was hired in his first top-flight job as a manager, with 12th-placed Montevideo City Torque.

On his Torque debut on 6 May 2022, Eguren recorded a 2–2 draw at Club Sportivo Cerrito. He resigned from the City Football Group-owned team on 20 September, having won four and lost half of 20 league matches.

== Personal life ==
During most of his career in Europe, Eguren did not count as a foreign player, due to the fact he was married to a Swedish woman.

Besides his musical preferences, ranging from Bob Dylan to Pink Floyd, and his literary ones (he is a fan of compatriots Mario Benedetti and Eduardo Galeano), Eguren spoke openly about politics, admiring president José Mujica, with whom he shared views in favour of legalising cannabis and abortion.

== Career statistics ==
Scores and results list Uruguay's goal tally first, score column indicates score after each Eguren goal.

List of international goals scored by Sebastián Eguren
No.	Date	Venue	Opponent	Score	Result	Competition	Ref.
1	28 May 2008	Ullevaal, Oslo, Norway	Norway	2–1	2–2	Friendly	
2	20 August 2008	Sapporo Dome, Sapporo, Japan	Japan	1–0	3–1	Friendly	
3	6 September 2008	El Campín, Bogotá, Colombia	Colombia	1–0	1–0	2010 World Cup qualification	
4	11 February 2009	11 June, Tripoli, Libya	Libya	1–0	3–2	Friendly	
5	9 September 2009	Centenario, Montevideo, Uruguay	Colombia	3–1	3–1	2010 World Cup qualification	
6	8 October 2010	Gelora Bung Karno, Jakarta, Indonesia	Indonesia	4–1	7–1	Friendly	
7	10 June 2012	Centenario, Montevideo, Uruguay	Peru	4–2	4–2	2014 World Cup qualification	

== Honours ==
AIK

- Svenska Supercupen: 2010

Palmeiras

- Campeonato Brasileiro Série B: 2013

Uruguay

- Copa América: 2011
