= Pontus Engblom =

Swedish footballer

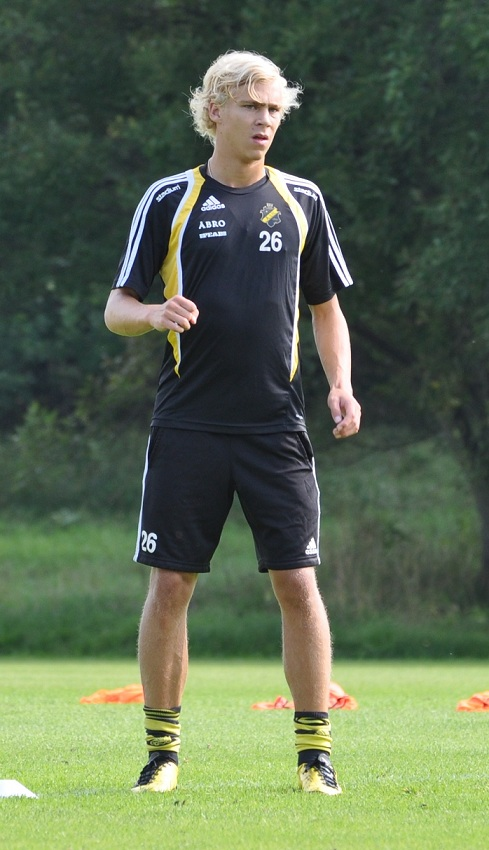

Personal information
- Full name: Pontus Engblom
- Date of birth: 3 November 1991 (age 35)
- Place of birth: Sundsvall, Sweden
- Height: 1.84 m (6 ft 0 in)
- Positions: Forward; winger

Youth career
- IFK Sundsvall

Senior career*
Years	Team	Apps	(Gls)
2007–2008	IFK Sundsvall	37	(29)
2009–2012	AIK	25	(1)
2009	→ Väsby United (loan)	14	(1)
2009	→ Västerås SK (loan)	3	(4)
2010	→ Väsby United (loan)	5	(0)
2010	→ Västerås SK (loan)	1	(0)
2011	→ GIF Sundsvall (loan)	30	(13)
2012–2015	Haugesund	31	(3)
2013	→ GIF Sundsvall (loan)	6	(0)
2015–2016	Sandnes Ulf	56	(43)
2017–2018	Strømsgodset	18	(0)
2018–2019	Sandefjord	55	(25)
2020–2025	GIF Sundsvall	172	(51)
Total		453	(170)

International career
2008	Sweden U17	5	(4)
2009–2010	Sweden U19	5	(0)
- * Club domestic league appearances and goals

Pontus Engblom (born 3 November 1991) is a Swedish former professional footballer who played as a forward. He last played for GIF Sundsvall.

Engblom has won Allsvenskan, Svenska Cupen and Supercupen in Sweden, and has been the top scorer in the Norwegian First Division three times.

== Career statistics ==
As of 7 July 2021

Club	Season	Division	League		Cup		Total	
Club	Season	Division	Apps	Goals	Apps	Goals	Apps	Goals
AIK	2009	Allsvenskan	2	0	0	0	2	0
AIK	2010	Allsvenskan	17	0	0	0	17	0
AIK	2012	Allsvenskan	6	1	0	0	6	1
AIK	Total		25	1	0	0	25	1
Väsby United (loan)	2009	Superettan	14	1	0	0	14	1
Västerås SK (loan)	2009	Division 1 Norra	3	4	0	0	3	4
Väsby United (loan)	2010	Superettan	5	0	0	0	5	0
GIF Sundsvall (loan)	2011	Superettan	30	13	0	0	30	13
Haugesund	2012	Tippeligaen	12	2	1	0	13	2
Haugesund	2013	Tippeligaen	12	0	4	4	16	4
Haugesund	2014	Tippeligaen	7	1	2	0	9	1
Haugesund	Total		31	3	7	4	38	7
GIF Sundsvall (loan)	2013	Superettan	6	0	0	0	6	0
Sandnes Ulf	2015	1. divisjon	26	17	1	0	27	17
Sandnes Ulf	2016	1. divisjon	30	26	3	2	33	28
Sandnes Ulf	Total		56	43	4	2	60	45
Strømsgodset	2017	Eliteserien	18	0	2	3	20	3
Strømsgodset	Total		18	0	2	3	20	3
Sandefjord	2018	Eliteserien	28	6	1	1	29	7
Sandefjord	2019	OBOS-ligaen	27	19	2	0	29	19
Sandefjord	Total		55	25	3	1	58	26
GIF Sundsvall	2020	Superettan	30	20	3	1	33	21
GIF Sundsvall	2021	Superettan	11	5	4	0	15	5
GIF Sundsvall	Total		41	25	7	1	48	26
Career total			281	115	23	11	304	126

== Honours ==
AIK

- Allsvenskan: 2009
- Svenska Cupen: 2009
- Supercupen: 2010

Individual

- Norwegian First Division top scorer: 2015, 2016, 2019
- Superettan top scorer: 2020
