= Imad Chhadeh =

Swedish-Assyrian footballer

Personal information
- Full name: Imad Chhadeh
- Date of birth: 12 October 1979 (age 47)
- Place of birth: Damascus, Syria
- Height: 1.80 m (5 ft 11 in)
- Position: Midfielder

Team information
- Current team: Assyriska
- Number: 9

Senior career*
Years	Team	Apps	(Gls)
2001–2006	Åtvidabergs FF	131	(29)
2006–2007	Løv-Ham Fotball	10	(2)
2007–2011	IF Brommapojkarna	40	(4)
2011	Assyriska	10	(0)

International career^{‡}
2001	Syria	2	(0)
- * Club domestic league appearances and goals as of 22 December 2011 ‡ National team caps and goals as of 16 January 2003

Imad Chhadeh (born 12 October 1979) is a Swedish footballer who currently plays under contract for Swedish side Assyriska.
