= Clayton de Sousa Moreira =

Luxembourgish footballer

Personal information
- Full name: Clayton de Sousa Moreira
- Date of birth: 24 February 1988 (age 38)
- Place of birth: Luxembourg
- Height: 1.76 m (5 ft 9 1/2 in)
- Position: Right back

Senior career*
Years	Team	Apps	(Gls)
2004–2014	Jeunesse Esch	190	(7)
2014–2019	F91 Dudelange	81	(3)
2019–2022	Jeunesse Esch	39	(1)
2022–2023	Mondercange	16	(0)

International career^{‡}
2006–2007	Luxembourg	7	(0)
- * Club domestic league appearances and goals as of 28 June 2023 ‡ National team caps and goals as of 26 July 2020

Clayton de Sousa Moreira (born 24 February 1988) is a retired Luxembourgish footballer who last played as a right back for Mondercange in the Luxembourg National Division, and formerly the Luxembourg national football team.

== Club career ==
=== Jeunesse Esch ===
In 2004, he signed for Luxembourg National Division outfit Jeunesse Esch. He has since been an integral part of the first making many appearances in both league and continental competitions.

== International career ==
On 27 May 2006 he made his debut for the Luxembourg national football team in a friendly match against Germany.
