= Dan Collette =

Luxembourgish footballer

Personal information
- Full name: Daniel Collette
- Date of birth: 2 April 1985 (age 41)
- Place of birth: Luxembourg
- Positions: Striker; defender

Youth career
- Swift Hesperange
- FC Orania Vianden
- 1. FC Bitburg

Senior career*
Years	Team	Apps	(Gls)
2002–2006	Swift Hesperange		
2006–2015	Jeunesse Esch		
2015–2018	Strassen	44	(2)

International career^{‡}
2004–2014	Luxembourg	28	(0)
- * Club domestic league appearances and goals as of 05:16, 1 October 2020 (UTC) ‡ National team caps and goals as of 05:23, 1 October 2020 (UTC)

Daniel Collette (born 2 April 1985) is a Luxembourgish footballer, who last played, as a striker or defender for Strassen.

== Club career ==
He started his senior career at his former youth club Swift Hesperange but left them for local giants Jeunesse Esch in 2006. He moved again, to Strassen in 2015.

== International career ==
Collette made his debut for Luxembourg in a September 2004 World Cup qualification match against Latvia, coming on as a late substitute for Alphonse Leweck. He went on to earn 28 caps, scoring no goals. He played in 9 World Cup qualification matches.
