= Clécio =

Brazilian footballer (born 1988)

Personal information
- Full name: Clécio Nascimento Santos
- Date of birth: 31 May 1988 (age 38)
- Place of birth: Januária–MG, Brazil
- Height: 1.87 m (6 ft 1 1/2 in)
- Position: Striker

Team information
- Current team: Ceilândia

Senior career*
Years	Team	Apps	(Gls)
2007	Paranoá	10	(3)
2007–2008	Brasliense	12	(4)
2008	Santa Maria	10	(3)
2008	Samambaia	5	(2)
2009	Brasília	4	(1)
2009	Fenix	6	(4)
2009	Paranoá	5	(3)
2010	Morrinhos	5	(3)
2010	→ AIK (loan)	3	(0)
2010–2011	Olhanense		
2011	Trindade	1	(0)
2011	Capital		
2012	→ Sobradinho (loan)		
2012	Aimoré		
2013	Ceilândia		
2014	Brasília		
2014–2015	Luverdense		
2015	Brasília		
2016–	Ceilândia		
- * Club domestic league appearances and goals

Clécio Nascimento Santos (31 May 1988 in Januária) commonly known as Clécio, is a Brazilian footballer.

== Career ==
In April 2010, Clécio joined AIK Fotboll on a loan. After three matches in the spring, he was sent back.
