= Christoffer Eriksson =

Swedish footballer

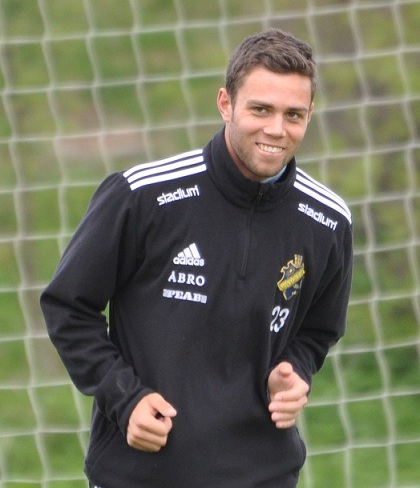

Personal information
- Full name: Lennart Christoffer Eriksson
- Date of birth: 25 May 1990 (age 36)
- Place of birth: Sweden
- Height: 1.86 m (6 ft 1 in)
- Position: Defender

Youth career
- Vasalunds IF

Senior career*
Years	Team	Apps	(Gls)
2008–2009	Väsby United	32	(0)
2010–2011	AIK	7	(0)
2010–2011	→ Väsby United (loan)	29	(1)
2012–2013	Degerfors IF	48	(1)
2014–2015	Assyriska FF	45	(1)
- * Club domestic league appearances and goals as of 1 January 2016

Christoffer Eriksson (born 25 May 1990) is a Swedish former footballer who played as a defender.
