= 2010 Svenska Supercupen =

- Event: Svenska Supercupen
AIK	IFK Göteborg
1	0
- Date: 6 March 2010
- Venue: Råsunda, Stockholm
- Referee: Markus Strömbergsson
- Attendance: 2,537

2010 'Svenska Supercupen' (Swedish Super Cup 2010) was the 4th edition Svenska Supercupen annual football match that AIK (league and cup double-champions) successfully defended against IFK Göteborg, 1-0. Svenska Supercupen is usually contested by the winners of the previous season's Allsvenskan and Svenska Cupen. However, AIK won both titles in 2009, they faced the Allsvenskan runners-up IFK Göteborg. The game was staged on 6 March 2010 at Råsunda Fotbollsstadion in Stockholm, the Swedish national football stadium and the home of AIK.

Antônio Flávio scored the only goal of the game in 22nd minute after AIK had been awarded a free kick in offensive territory. The free kick was taken quickly by Bojan Djordjic and thus AIK gained advantage and set the score to 1-0.

== Match facts ==
6 March 2010
16:00 CEST

AIK	1–0	IFK Göteborg
Flávio 22'	Report

Råsunda, Stockholm
Attendance: 2,537
Referee: Markus Strömbergsson

AIK	IFK Göteborg

AIK:
GK	12	(Finland) Tomi Maanoja
RB	14	(England) Kenny Pavey	(yellow card) 35'
CB	3	(Sweden) Per Karlsson
CB	6	(Sweden) Walid Atta	(yellow card) 79'
LB	4	(Sweden) Nils-Eric Johansson
RM	10	(Sweden) Martin Kayongo-Mutumba
CM	5	(Argentina) Jorge Ortiz
CM	8	(Sweden) Daniel Tjernström (c)
LM	7	(Sweden) Bojan Djordjic	(yellow card) 31'
FW	33	(Uruguay) Sebastián Eguren	(yellow card) 77'
FW	11	(Brazil) Antônio Flávio	(substituted off) 75'
Substitutes:
DF	2	(Sweden) Niklas Backman
FW	9	(Slovenia) Miran Burgič	(substituted in) 75'
MF	15	(Sweden) Kevin Walker
MF	24	(Sweden) Daniel Gustavsson
FW	26	(Sweden) Pontus Engblom
MF	28	(Sweden) Viktor Lundberg
GK	76	(Sweden) Lee Baxter
Manager:
(Sweden) Mikael Stahre

IFK GÖTEBORG:
GK	1	(Denmark) Kim Christensen
RB	16	(Sweden) Erik Lund
CB	10	(Iceland) Ragnar Sigurdsson
CB	2	(Sweden) Karl Svensson
LB	14	(Iceland) Hjálmar Jónsson	(yellow card) 36'
DM	8	(Sweden) Thomas Olsson	(yellow card) 9'	(substituted off) 63'
RM	9	(Sweden) Stefan Selakovic (c)
CM	13	(Sweden) Gustav Svensson
CM	18	(Sweden) Pär Ericsson	(yellow card) 62'	(substituted off) 63'
LM	28	(Iceland) Teddy Bjarnason	(yellow card) 30'
FW	7	(Sweden) Tobias Hysén
Substitutes:
DF	5	(Finland) Tuomo Turunen
GK	12	(Sweden) Markus Sandberg
MF	15	(Sweden) Jakob Johansson	(substituted in) 63'
MF	20	(Sweden) Alexander Faltsetas	(substituted in) 63'
MF	22	(Sweden) Tobias Sana
FW	29	(Sweden) Chris Mbamba
FW	30	(Sweden) William Atashkadeh
Manager:
(Sweden) Jonas Olsson (Sweden) Stefan Rehn
