= Antônio Flávio =

Brazilian footballer (born 1987)

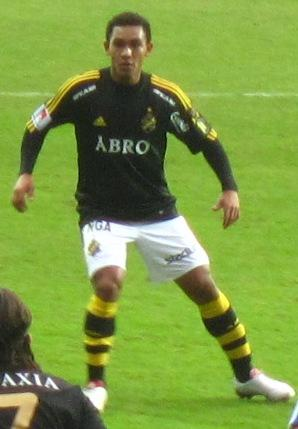

Personal information
- Full name: Antônio Flávio Aires dos Santos
- Date of birth: 5 January 1987 (age 39)
- Place of birth: Brejinho de Nazaré, Brazil
- Height: 1.75 m (5 ft 9 in)
- Position: Forward

Youth career
- 2003–2005: Atlético Goianiense
- 2005–2006: Andraus
- 2007: Santo André

Senior career*
Years	Team	Apps	(Gls)
2008–2009	Santo André	18	(7)
2009–2012	AIK	37	(7)
2011	→ São Caetano (loan)	43	(9)
2012–2013	Shanghai Shenxin	51	(6)
2014	Ponte Preta	13	(1)
2014	Bragantino	6	(1)
2014–2015	Capivariano	4	(0)
2015	Madureira	0	(0)
2015–2016	Vila Nova	0	(0)
2016	Santo André	17	(1)
2017	Flamengo-SP	7	(1)
2017	Gurupi	7	(1)
2017	Interporto	5	(0)
Total		208	(34)
- * Club domestic league appearances and goals as of 22:37, 16 July 2011 (UTC)

Antônio Flávio Aires dos Santos (born 5 January 1987) is a Brazilian former footballer who plays as a striker. Antônio Flávio is more commonly known as Flávio by the fans and commentators.

== Career ==
Flávio started his career at Atlético Goianiense (from 2003 to 2005), then he went on to Andraus (2006). In 2007, he was signed to Santo André and he was put on their professional squad a year later.

Flávio was in 2009 spotted by AIK Fotboll representatives and was later signed to the Swedish club. Flávio quickly formed a good partnership with Argentinian striker Iván Obolo. Flávio's first goal for the Solna club came against Gothenburg team Häcken. He added another two goals to his tally when he struck two goals against Stockholm rivals Djurgårdens IF. His celebration became controversial after he tore off his shirt, revealing an identical match shirt under it. He also caused some controversy post-game when a T-shirt adorned with "Hata Göteborg" (Hate Gothenburg) was given to him. Flávio later said that he didn't know what the phrase meant; he thought it had something to do with the fight for first place. On 1 November 2009, Flávio won Allsvenskan with AIK after scoring the equaliser against IFK Göteborg. AIK went on to win the game 2–1 away at Ullevi.

On 3 January Flávio transferred to Shanghai Shenxin of the Chinese Super League.

== Career statistics ==
As of 20 May 2018

Appearances and goals by club, season and competition
Club	Season	League			State League		Cup		Continental		Other		Total	
Club	Season	Division	Apps	Goals	Apps	Goals	Apps	Goals	Apps	Goals	Apps	Goals	Apps	Goals
Santo André	2009	Série A	2	1	16	6	—		—		—		18	7
AIK	2009	Allsvenskan	10	5	—		2	1	—		—		12	6
AIK	2010	Allsvenskan	27	2	—		3	1	5	0	1	1	36	4
AIK	Total		37	7	—		5	2	5	0	1	1	48	10
São Caetano (loan)	2011	Série B	33	7	10	2	—		—		—		43	9
Shanghai Shenxin	2012	Chinese Super League	22	4	—		1	0	—		—		23	4
Shanghai Shenxin	2013	Chinese Super League	29	2	—		1	0	—		—		30	6
Shanghai Shenxin	Total		51	6	—		2	0	—		—		53	6
Ponte Preta	2014	Série B	5	0	8	1	1	0	—		—		14	1
Bragantino	2014	Série B	6	1	—		—		—		—		6	1
Capivariano	2015	Campeonato Paulista	—		4	0	0	0	—		—		4	0
Madureira	2015	Campeonato Carioca	—		0	0	—		—		—		0	0
Vila Nova	2015	Série C	0	0	—		—		—		—		0	0
Santo André	2016	Campeonato Paulista Série A2	—		17	1	—		—		—		17	1
Flamengo-SP	2017	Campeonato Paulista Série A3	—		7	1	—		—		—		7	1
Gurupi	2017	Série D	7	1	—		—		—		—		7	1
Interporto	2018	Série D	5	0	—		1	0	—		4	0	10	0
Career total			208	34	62	11	9	2	5	0	5	1	271	50

== Honours ==
AIK

- Allsvenskan: 2009
- Svenska Cupen: 2009
- Supercupen: 2010
