= Ivan Turina =

Croatian footballer (1980–2013)

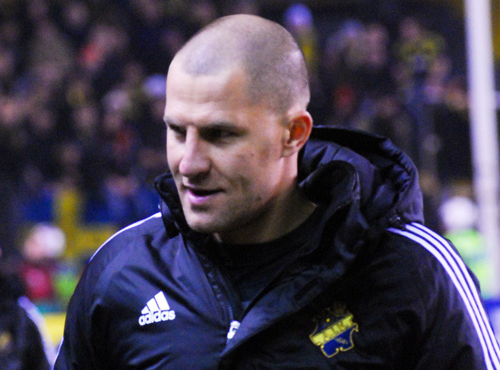
- Turina in 2012

Personal information
- Date of birth: 3 October 1980
- Place of birth: Zagreb, SR Croatia, SFR Yugoslavia
- Date of death: 2 May 2013 (aged 32)
- Place of death: Solna, Sweden
- Height: 1.97 m (6 ft 6 in)
- Position: Goalkeeper

Senior career*
| Years | Team | Apps | (Gls) |
| 1998–2007 | Dinamo Zagreb | 73 | (0) |
| 1999–2000 | → Croatia Sesvete (loan) | 0 | (0) |
| 2001–2002 | → Kamen Ingrad (loan) | 11 | (0) |
| 2002–2003 | → Osijek (loan) | 15 | (0) |
| 2007–2008 | Skoda Xanthi | 8 | (0) |
| 2008–2009 | Lech Poznań | 12 | (0) |
| 2010 | Dinamo Zagreb | 1 | (0) |
| 2010–2013 | AIK | 65 | (0) |
| Total | | 185 | (0) |

International career
| 1996 | Croatia U17 | 2 | (0) |
| 1998–1999 | Croatia U19 | 4 | (0) |
| 2000 | Croatia U20 | 4 | (0) |
| 2006 | Croatia | 1 | (0) |
- * Club domestic league appearances and goals

Ivan Turina (3 October 1980 – 2 May 2013) was a Croatian professional footballer who played as a goalkeeper. He made one appearance for the Croatia national team.

== Club career ==
Turina started his professional career with his youth club Dinamo Zagreb in 1998. Before settling as a first-team member in 2003, he completed loan spells at Croatia Sesvete, Kamen Ingrad and Osijek. He was Dinamo Zagreb's first-choice goalkeeper during the 2005–06 season, when the club won their first league title in two years. He continued to play regularly in the early stages of the following season. However, after Dinamo Zagreb were eliminated from the UEFA Cup with a 5–2 aggregate defeat to AJ Auxerre in the first round, Turina was replaced in the starting line-up by Filip Lončarić. At the time, he was criticized for letting a long-range shot by Ireneusz Jeleń slip through his hands when the French club took a 1–0 lead in the first leg in Zagreb. Following the signing of German goalkeeper Georg Koch in the summer of 2007, Turina decided to join Greek club Skoda Xanthi, spending one season with them before leaving for Polish club Lech Poznań.

Turina made his league debut for Lech Poznań on 31 October 2008 in a 3–1 win at home to Odra Wodzisław Śląski. He finished the season with a total of 12 appearances in the league and six in the UEFA Cup, where the club were eliminated by Udinese in the round of 32. He played in the final of the Polish Cup, which the club won that season. On 11 September 2009, Turina terminated his contract with Lech Poznań and started training with Dinamo Zagreb later that month.

On 27 January 2010, Dinamo Zagreb signed Turina as their new second-choice goalkeeper, behind Tomislav Butina, on a short-term contract until the end of the 2009–10 season. His sole appearance during that spell with the club came on 14 April 2010 in a 2–1 win at Varaždin, where he came on as a substitute for Butina at half-time.

Turina went on to join Swedish club AIK, making his debut on 17 July 2010 in a 2–0 win at home to Malmö FF. At the time of his death, he was in his fourth season with the club and had made a total of 65 appearances in the league.

== International career ==
Turina was part of the Croatia team at the 2006 Carlsberg Cup in Hong Kong. On 1 February 2006, he came on as a half-time substitute for Joey Didulica in the team's second match at the tournament, a 4–0 win against the hosts. It was his only full international appearance.

== Death ==
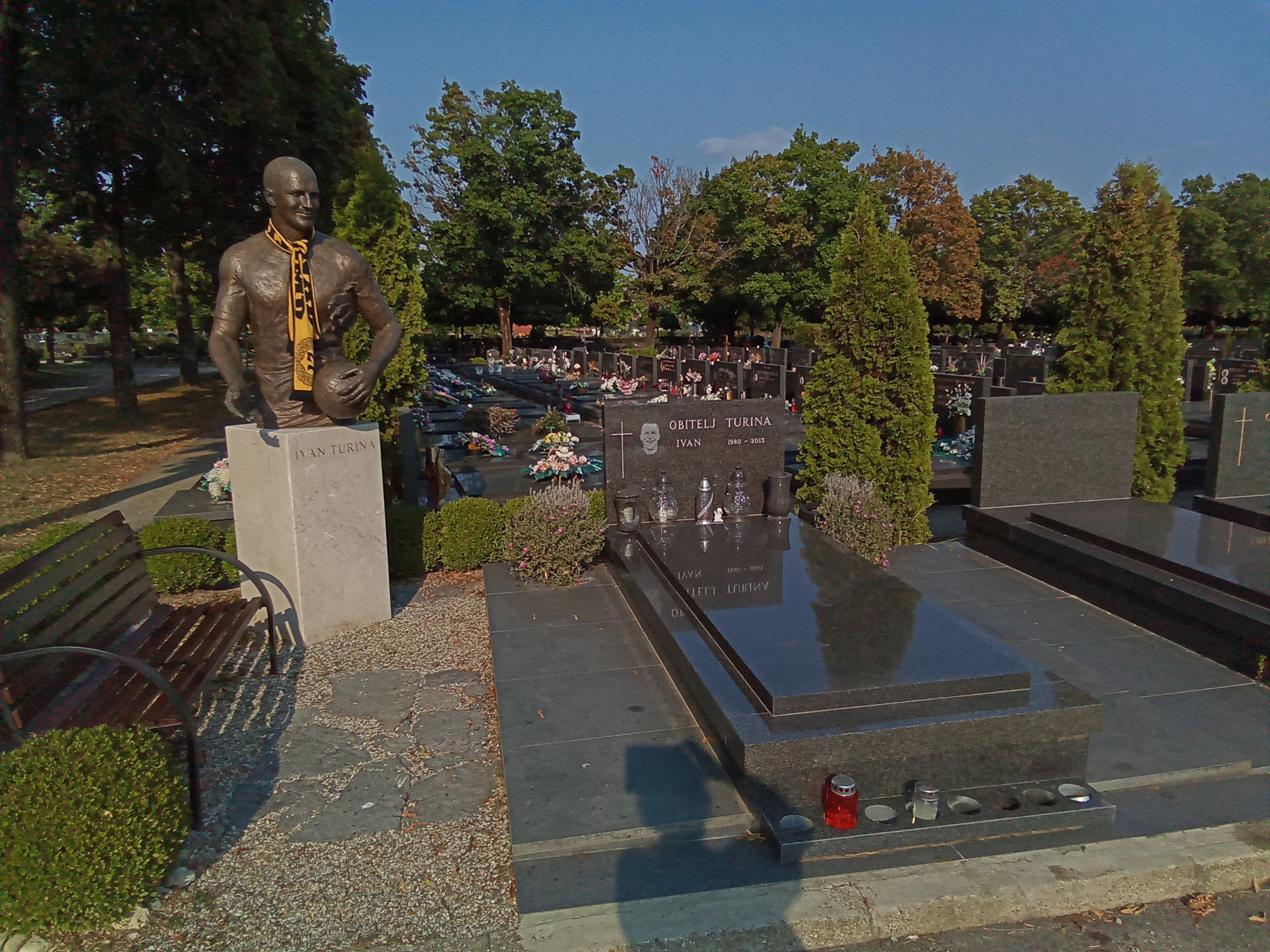
Ivan Turina's grave at the Miroševac Cemetery in Zagreb.

On 2 May 2013, Turina died in his sleep in his apartment in Solna. His wife did not realize what had happened until the morning. The autopsy report, released on 10 July 2013, states that Turina's death was caused by cardiac dysrhythmia, a congenital heart defect. He was survived by one-year-old twin daughters and a pregnant wife.

On 13 May 2013, a charity game between AIK and Dinamo Zagreb, Turina's youth team where he also played as a professional until 2007 and in the spring of 2010, was played at Friends Arena to honour him. All proceedings from the game went to Turina's family. Each half of the game was 27 minutes long, as 27 was Turina's shirt number at AIK. Former AIK players Krister Nordin and Nebojša Novaković also played in the charity game, which Dinamo Zagreb won 1–0 in front of 8,058 spectators. Turina's family received US$170000 as a result of the charity event.

In every game played by the AIK male football squad since Turina's death, the fans spend the 27th minute chanting his name. This tradition has been upheld every single game since Turina's death.

== Honours ==
Dinamo Zagreb

- Prva HNL: 2005–06, 2006–07, 2009–10
- Croatian Cup: 2003–04, 2006–07
- Croatian Super Cup: 2006

Lech Poznań

- Polish Cup: 2008–09
