= Theódór Elmar Bjarnason =

Icelandic footballer (born 1987)

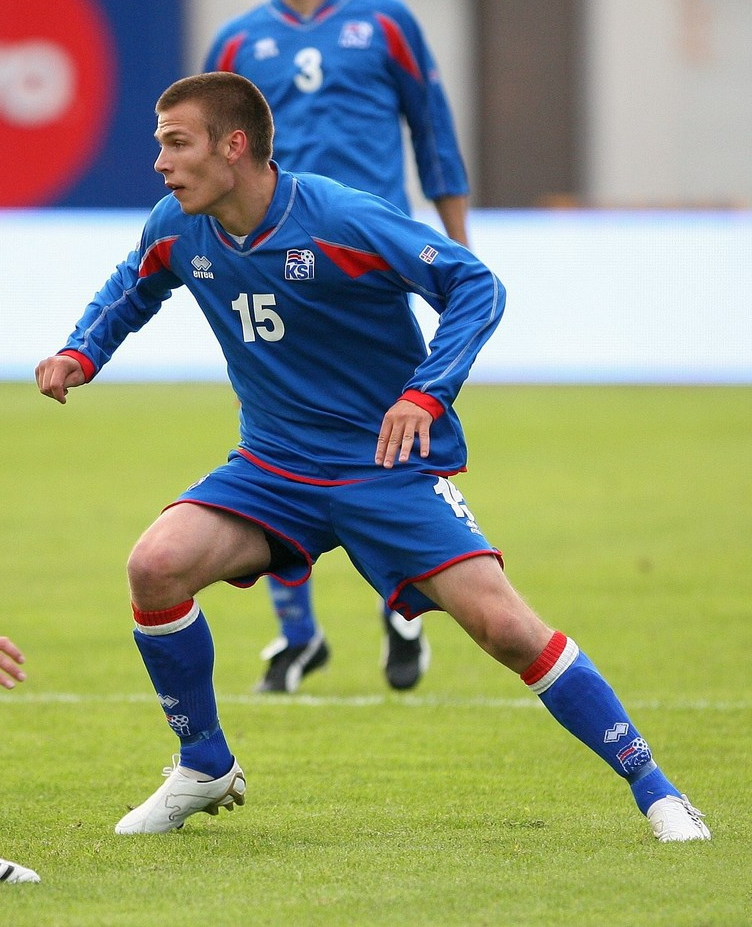
- Bjarnason with Iceland in 2008

Personal information
- Full name: Theódór Elmar Bjarnason
- Date of birth: 4 March 1987 (age 39)
- Place of birth: Reykjavík, Iceland
- Height: 1.83 m (6 ft 0 in)
- Position: Central midfielder

Team information
- Current team: KV

Senior career*
Years	Team	Apps	(Gls)
2003–2004	KR Reykjavík	10	(0)
2004–2008	Celtic	1	(0)
2008–2009	Lyn	40	(3)
2009–2012	IFK Göteborg	60	(4)
2012–2015	Randers	75	(3)
2015–2017	AGF	53	(2)
2017–2018	Elazığspor	39	(0)
2019	Gazişehir Gaziantep	13	(1)
2019–2020	Akhisarspor	36	(3)
2021	Lamia	17	(0)
2021–2025	KR Reykjavík	82	(8)
2025–	KV	0	(0)

International career^{‡}
2003–2004	Iceland U17	8	(1)
2004–2005	Iceland U19	9	(3)
2005–2008	Iceland U21	10	(1)
2007–2018	Iceland	41	(1)
- * Club domestic league appearances and goals as of 2 November 2024 ‡ National team caps and goals as of 9 September 2018

Theódór Elmar Bjarnason (born 4 March 1987) is an Icelandic professional footballer who plays as a central midfielder for KV.

== Club career ==
=== Early career ===
Born in Reykjavík, Iceland, Theódor played for KR Reykjavík in Iceland. He also played one season for the reserve team of the Norwegian club IK Start as a 16-year-old, but rejected an offer of a professional contract with them and moved back to Iceland.

=== Celtic ===
Theódór joined Celtic in 2004. He made his domestic debut for Celtic against Hibernian in the last game of the 2006–07 season and played the full 90 minutes in a match in which he was named man of the match by the Celtic website. He was also on the bench for the 1–0 win over Dunfermline in the 2007 Scottish Cup Final.

On 21 May 2007, Theódór announced he would put pen to paper on a two-year contract extension with Celtic to tie him to the club until the summer of 2009 and on 13 June, he signed a new three-year contract.

=== Lyn Oslo ===
On 15 January 2008, Theódór signed for Lyn Oslo, in a bid to play regular first team football again.

=== IFK Göteborg ===
Following severe financial difficulties in the running of Lyn, Theódór moved to IFK Göteborg on 22 July 2009.

=== Randers FC ===
In the start of 2012, Theódór signed a new contract with the Danish side Randers FC. However, he got injured in the start-up and was not able to play for six months.

=== AGF ===
In June 2015 he signed a two-year contract with the Danish club AGF. He left the club after two years.

=== Gazişehir Gaziantep ===
On 5 January 2019, Bjarnason signed with Turkish club Gazişehir Gaziantep for one and a half years.

=== Akhisarspor ===
On 24 July 2019, Bjarnason signed with Akhisarspor.

== International career ==
He was part of the Icelandic Euro 2016 squad, contributing one assist and also played on the 2017 China Cup, where Iceland won silver medals.

== International goals ==
List of international goals scored by Theódór Elmar Bjarnason
No.	Date	Venue	Cap	Opponent	Score	Result	Competition
1	9 October 2016	Laugardalsvöllur, Reykjavík, Iceland	32	Turkey	1–0	2–0	2018 FIFA World Cup qualification

== Personal life ==
His grandfather, Theódór Jakob Guðmundsson, played for KR Reykjavík in the golden years of that club and competed against Liverpool in 1964 in the first European game for both of these clubs.
