= Mikael Stahre =

Swedish football manager (born 1975)

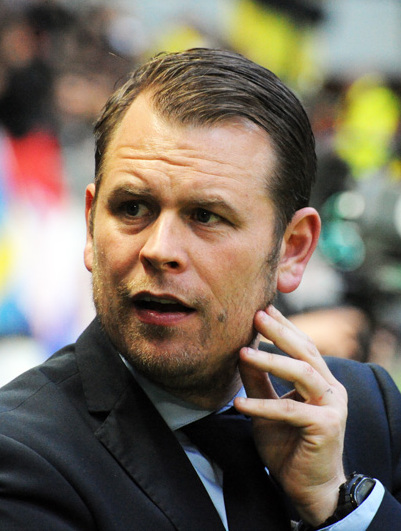
- Stahre in 2013

Personal information
- Full name: Mikael Lennart Tage Stahre
- Date of birth: 5 July 1975 (age 51)
- Height: 1.76 m (5 ft 9 in)

Team information
- Current team: Ludogorets Razgrad (assistant)

Managerial career
- Years: Team
- 2007–2008: Väsby United
- 2009–2010: AIK
- 2010: Panionios
- 2012–2014: IFK Göteborg
- 2015–2016: Dalian Yifang
- 2017: BK Häcken
- 2018: San Jose Earthquakes
- 2020–2021: Sarpsborg 08
- 2021–2023: IFK Göteborg
- 2023–2024: Uthai Thani
- 2024: Kerala Blasters
- 2025: Stabæk
- 2026: Helsingborgs IF

Mikael Lennart Tage "Micke" Stahre (Swedish pronunciation: [ˈmîːkaɛl ˈmɪ̂kːɛ ˈstɑ̂ːrɛ]; born 5 July 1975) is a Swedish professional football manager.

== Managerial career ==
Stahre is a national men's junior championship winning coach after leading the AIK youth side to the title in 2004. He has also trained youth teams at Hammarby IF and Gröndals IK.

From 2007 to 2008, he had served as manager of Väsby United. Stahre was appointed as AIK's manager on 10 November 2008, following the end of the 2008 campaign, replacing Rikard Norling.

On 26 April 2010, Panionios signed Stahre as their new manager. On 28 October 2010, Panionios announced the end of cooperation with Stahre.

On 24 November 2017, he was named head coach of Major League Soccer's San Jose Earthquakes. On 17 September 2018, the club announced it had parted ways with Stahre.

On 13 January 2020, Stahre was announced as the new head coach at Sarpsborg 08.

=== Kerala Blasters ===
On 23 May 2024, Stahre was appointed as the head coach of Indian Super League club Kerala Blasters on a two-year contract. His first game as the Blasters' gaffer came in the 2024 Durand Cup match against Mumbai City on 1 August, which the Blasters won with a record-breaking score of 8–0. This victory set a new club record for win margin, making it the highest win in the club's history. It also tied the record for the biggest win in Durand Cup history, matching the 1889 final where Highland Light Infantry defeated Shimla Rifles by the same score.

On 16 December 2024, following poor performances of the club in the league, the Blasters announced that Stahre has left the head coach position at the club.

== Managerial statistics ==
As of match played 29 October 2025

Managerial record by team and tenure
Team	Nat	From	To	Record				
Team	Nat	From	To	G	W	D	L	Win %
Väsby United	(Sweden)	1 January 2007	31 December 2008	64	32	12	20	50.00
AIK	(Sweden)	1 January 2009	24 April 2010	45	25	11	9	55.56
Panionios	(Greece)	25 April 2010	28 October 2010	8	1	1	6	12.50
IFK Göteborg	(Sweden)	5 December 2011	3 November 2014	111	52	33	26	46.85
Dalian Yifang	(China)	1 January 2015	5 July 2016	49	27	10	12	55.10
BK Häcken	(Sweden)	1 January 2017	23 November 2017	36	18	11	7	50.00
San Jose Earthquakes	(United States)	24 November 2017	17 September 2018	29	4	8	17	13.79
Sarpsborg 08	(Norway)	13 January 2020	1 June 2021	34	9	10	15	26.47
IFK Göteborg	(Sweden)	2 June 2021	8 March 2023	61	28	7	26	45.90
Uthai Thani	(Thailand)	8 September 2023	21 April 2024	25	7	9	9	28.00
Kerala Blasters	(India)	23 May 2024	16 December 2024	16	5	3	8	31.25
Stabæk	(Norway)	15 August 2025	24 November 2025	12	5	4	3	41.67
Total				490	213	119	158	43.47

== Honours ==
AIK

- Allsvenskan: 2009
- Svenska Cupen: 2009
- Supercupen: 2010

IFK Göteborg

- Svenska Cupen: 2012–13

Individual

- Thai League 1 Coach of the Month: October 2023

== See also ==
- List of Major League Soccer coaches
