= 2009 Svenska Cupen =

Tournament details
- Country: Sweden
- Teams: 97

Final positions
- Champions: AIK
- Runners-up: IFK Göteborg

Tournament statistics
- Matches played: 96

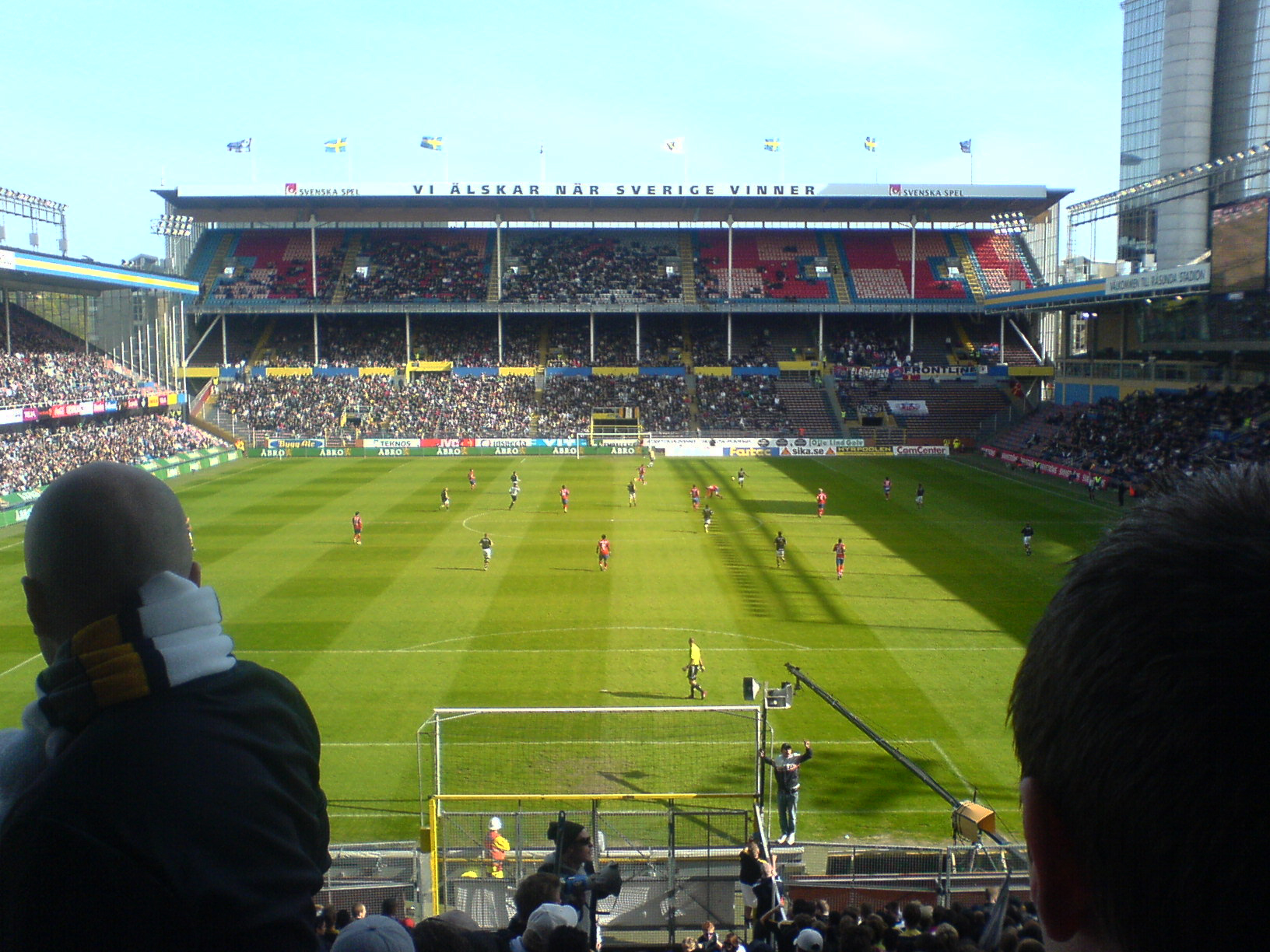
The final match of the season, between AIK and Helsingborgs IF (0-1).

The 2009 Svenska Cupen was the 54th season of the main Swedish football Cup. AIK beat IFK Göteborg in the final 2-0 to lift the cup, thereby completing a league and cup double for the 2009 season. The competition started on 14 March 2009 and concluded with the final on November 7, 2009.

== Preliminary round ==
50 teams from the third level or lower of the Swedish league pyramid competed in this round.

Team 1	Score	Team 2
14 March 2009
IF Lödde	0–3	Kristianstads FF
Slottsskogen/Godhem IF	0–5	IK Gauthiod
21 March 2009
Ljungby IF	1–2	Husqvarna FF
Hammarby TFF	5–1	Vallentuna BK
Enskede IK	1–0	Linköpings FF
Mjölby AI FF	2–4	Vetlanda FF
Växjö Norra IF	0–4	IFK Hässleholm
22 March 2009
Gröndals IK	3–1	Heby AIF
IFK Fjärås	1–2	Gunnilse IS
FC Widerlöv Uppsala	1–4	Kvarnsvedens IK
IK Östria Lambohov	0–2	Nyköpings BIS
Reymersholms IK	0–5	Arameiska-Syrianska KIF
Dalkurd FF	4–2	Västerås SK
Sjöbo IF	0–3	IFK Malmö
Höganäs BK	0–2	IFK Klagshamn
Åsebro IF	2–5	Karlstad BK
Tidaholms GoIF	2–6	IK Oddevold
Asarums IF FK	0–6	IFK Berga
Hudiksvalls ABK	3–4	Sandvikens IF
Handelskamraternas IS	2–0	Dalhem IF
Rydaholms GoIF	0–3	IS Halmia
KF Velebit	1–0	Kinna IF
Domsjö IF	1–4	IFK Timrå
Skrea IF	0–4	Lunds BK
Sollentuna United FF	1–0	Valsta Syrianska IK

== Round 1 ==
Twelve lower league teams, three teams which earned promotion to Superettan 2009 and the bottom eight teams from Superettan 2008 entered in this round. They were joined by 25 preliminary round winners.

Team 1	Score	Team 2
25 March 2009
Nyköpings BIS	3–3 (aet); 4–5 (p)	Syrianska FC
28 March 2009
IFK Malmö	0–3	Kristianstads FF
Norrby IF	2–1	Husqvarna FF
Alviks IK	1–4	Ersboda SK
Lunds BK	0–1	Landskrona BoIS
Skövde AIK	3–1	Degerfors IF
29 March 2009
KB Karlskoga	0–2	BK Forward
Markaryd IF	0–2	IS Halmia
Hammarby TFF	3–1	Vasalunds IF
IFK Berga	2–7	IFK Hässleholm
IFK Klagshamn	0–2	IF Limhamn Bunkeflo
IK Oddevold	1–3	Lindome GIF
IFK Timrå	0–5	Östersunds FK
IFK Umeå	1–4	IFK Luleå
KF Velebit	0–4	Gunnilse IS
Karlstad BK	2–7	FC Trollhättan
Sollentuna United FF	0–2	Väsby United
IK Gauthiod	0–4	Qviding FIF
30 March 2009
Enskede IK	1–0	Arameiska-Syrianska KIF
2 April 2009
Vetlanda FF	0–2	Jönköpings Södra IF
Handelskamraternas IS	0–3	Gröndals IK
3 April 2009
Dalkurd FF	1–2	IK Sirius
4 April 2009
Kvarnsvedens IK	0–2	Sandvikens IF
IFK Ölme	4–1	Karlslunds IF

== Round 2 ==
Three demoted teams from Allsvenskan 2008 and five teams ranked 4th through 8th in Superettan 2008 entered in this round, where they were joined by 24 winners from Round 1.

Team 1	Score	Team 2
8 April 2009
Gröndals IK	3–4 (aet)	IK Sirius
Sandvikens IF	0–2	Syrianska FC
IFK Ölme	1–2	Assyriska FF
IS Halmia	1–4	Kristianstads FF
Ängelholms FF	1–3 (aet)	Ljungskile SK
Gunnilse IS	2–0	Jönköpings Södra IF
IF Limhamn Bunkeflo	1–3	Mjällby AIF
IFK Luleå	1–5 (aet)	GIF Sundsvall
FC Trollhättan	2–3	Qviding FIF
Norrby IF	0–3	Åtvidabergs FF
Ersboda SK	3–1	Östersunds FK
Enskede IK	1–2	IFK Norrköping
IFK Hässleholm	2–2 (aet); 3–2 (p)	Falkenbergs FF
Lindome GIF	0–1	Landskrona BoIS
Hammarby TFF	0–3	Väsby United
9 April 2009
BK Forward	0–3	Skövde AIK

== Round 3 ==
Sixteen teams from Allsvenskan 2009 will enter in this round. They will be joined by the 16 winners of Round 2.

Team 1	Score	Team 2
25 April 2009
Kristianstads FF	1–4	Örebro SK
Ljungskile SK	1–2 (aet)	IF Elfsborg
Ersboda SK	1–8	IFK Göteborg
Åtvidabergs FF	2–3 (aet)	Hammarby IF
Syrianska FC	5–1 (aet)	Trelleborgs FF
26 April 2009
Qviding FIF	1–3	Gefle IF
Assyriska FF	2–4	BK Häcken
GIF Sundsvall	1–0	Kalmar FF
Väsby United	0–2	Helsingborg IF
IFK Hässleholm	0–2	Djurgårdens IF
Skövde AIK	0–2	Halmstads BK
Landskrona BoIS	4–2	GAIS
Mjällby AIF	1–0	Malmö FF
IK Sirius	2–0 (aet)	IF Brommapojkarna
Gunnilse IS	2–0	Örgryte IS
IFK Norrköping	1–2	AIK

== Round 4 ==
The sixteen winning teams from round 3.

Team 1	Score	Team 2
13 May 2009
Örebro SK	3–0	Halmstads BK
Syrianska FC	2–1	IF Elfsborg
Landskrona BoIS	1–4	IFK Göteborg
Mjällby AIF	4–2	Hammarby IF
Gefle IF	1–0	Djurgårdens IF
GIF Sundsvall	3–5	BK Häcken
IK Sirius	0–1	AIK
14 May 2009
Gunnilse IS	0–7	Helsingborgs IF

== Quarter-finals ==
28 June 2009	Syrianska FC	1–3 (a.e.t.)	Helsingborgs IF	Södertälje
17:00	I. Zatara 80'		E. Sundin 62', 120'; Makondele 93'	Stadium: Södertälje Fotbollsarena; Attendance: 1,050; Referee: Jonas Eriksson

8 July 2009	Mjällby AIF	1–2	AIK	Hällevik
19:00	E. Fejzullahu 9'		I. Óbolo 39'; Kayongo-Mutumba 50'	Stadium: Strandvallen; Attendance: 6,661; Referee: Håkan Jonasson

8 July 2009	BK Häcken	1–0	Örebro SK	Gothenburg
19:00	Paulinho 60'			Stadium: Rambergsvallen; Attendance: 1,031; Referee: Martin Olsson

9 July 2009	IFK Göteborg	3–1	Gefle IF	Gothenburg
19:00	T. Hysén 21', 33'; N. Bärkroth 89'		A. Jawo 77'	Stadium: Gamla Ullevi; Attendance: 3,853; Referee: Magnus Ahlsén

== Semi-finals ==
6 September 2009	AIK	3–2 (a.e.t.)	BK Häcken	Solna
15:00	I. Obolo 21'; N-E. Johansson 118'; M. Jonsson 120'		Vinicius 89', 95'	Stadium: Råsunda; Attendance: 8,117; Referee: Martin Ingvarsson

16 September 2009	Helsingborgs IF	1–3	IFK Göteborg	Helsingborg
19:00	E. Sundin 41'		S. Eriksson 17'; T. Hysen 75'; T. Bjarnason 84'	Stadium: Olympia; Attendance: 4,851; Referee: Stefan Johannesson

== Final ==
7 November 2009
16:00

AIK	2–0	IFK Göteborg
Obolo 72'; Flávio 90'	Report

Råsunda, Solna
Attendance: 24,365
Referee: Jonas Eriksson
