= 2010 Svenska Cupen final =

- Event: 2010 Svenska Cupen
Hammarby IF	Helsingborgs IF
0	1
- Date: 13 November 2010
- Venue: Söderstadion, Stockholm
- Referee: Daniel Stålhammar (Landskrona)
- Attendance: 12,357

The 2010 Svenska Cupen final took place on 13 November 2010 at Söderstadion in Stockholm. The match was contested by Superettan side Hammarby IF and Allsvenskan side Helsingborgs IF. Hammarby, who had never won the cup, appeared in the final for the first time since 1983. Helsingborg's most recent appearance had been four years earlier in 2006, when they won their third cup title.

A late strike in the 80th minute by Rasmus Jönsson secured the cup title for Helsingborg and ended a very successful season for the Scanian team. A week before, they had also finished runners-up in Allsvenskan.

== Road to the Final ==
Hammarby IF			Helsingborgs IF	
Värmdö IF [D2] A 2-3 (aet)	Holmqvist 72'; Hallenius 90'; Holmqvist 91'	Second round		
Trelleborgs FF [AS] H 3-1	Helg 4'; Helg 54'; Bojassen 80'	Third round	Hammarby TFF [D1] A 1-3	Makondele 28'; Jönsson 58', 60'
IF Elfsborg [AS] H 3-1	Castro-Tello 8'; Furuseth Olsen 68'; Castro-Tello 70'	Fourth round	BK Häcken [AS] H 2-1	Lindström 89'; Sundin 90'+4
IF Brommapojkarna [AS] H 2-2 (AET), 5-4 (p)	Castro-Tello 23'; Hallenius 45'	Quarter finals	AIK [AS] A 1-1 (AET), 3-4 (p)	Lindström 41'
Kalmar FF [AS] H 2-2 (AET), 4-3 (p)	Törnstrand 32'; Castro-Tello 43'	Semi finals	Mjällby AIF [AS] H 2-0	Sundin 63'; Holgersson 79'

- Helsingborgs IF entered the tournament in the third round.
- Square brackets [ ] represent the opposition's division.

== Match details ==
13 November 2010
16:00 CET

Hammarby IF	0–1	Helsingborgs IF
	Report	Jönsson 80'

Söderstadion, Stockholm
Attendance: 12,357
Referee: Daniel Stålhammar (Landskrona)

Hammarby	Helsingborg

GK	40	(Sweden) Johannes Hopf	(yellow card) 77'
RB	2	(Sweden) David Johansson
CB	27	(Sweden) Marcus Törnstrand		(substituted off) 46'
CB	3	(Sweden) José Monteiro (c)
LB	25	(Sweden) Fadi Malke
RM	15	(Norway) Petter Furuseth Olsen		(substituted off) 76'
CM	4	(Denmark) Christian Traoré	(yellow card) 28'
CM	10	(Sweden) Andreas Dahl
LM	23	(Sweden) Maic Sema
FW	9	(Sweden) Sebastian Castro-Tello	(yellow card) 39'
FW	18	(Sweden) Max Forsberg		(substituted off) 81'
Substitutes:
DF	6	(Sweden) Patrik Gerrbrand		(substituted on) 46'
MF	8	(Sweden) Fredrik Söderström
DF	13	(Sweden) Isak Dahlin
FW	16	(Sweden) Tobias Holmqvist
MF	26	(Sweden) Simon Helg		(substituted on) 81'
GK	30	(Sweden) George Moussan
FW	36	(Sweden) Christer Gustafsson	(yellow card) 90+1'	(substituted on) 76'
Manager:
(Sweden) Roger Franzén

GK	30	(Sweden) Pär Hansson
RB	21	(Sweden) Christoffer Andersson	(substituted off) 46'
CB	24	(Sweden) Marcus Nilsson
CB	26	(Sweden) Joel Ekstrand
LB	14	(Sweden) Erik Edman
RM	19	(Sweden) Rasmus Jönsson	(substituted off) 90'
CM	6	(South Africa) May Mahlangu
CM	10	(Sweden) Marcus Lantz (c)
LM	21	(Netherlands) Rachid Bouaouzan	(substituted off) 46'
FW	9	(Sweden) Erik Sundin
FW	18	(Sweden) Alexander Gerndt
Substitutes:
GK	1	(Sweden) Oscar Berglund
DF	5	(Finland) Hannu Patronen	(substituted on) 90'
MF	7	(Sweden) Mattias Lindström
MF	8	(Norway) Ardian Gashi	(substituted on) 46'
FW	11	(Brazil) Rafael Porcellis
DF	23	(Sweden) Erik Wahlstedt	(substituted on) 46'
DF	27	(Sweden) Johan Eiswohld
Manager:
(Sweden) Conny Karlsson

MATCH OFFICIALS

- Assistant referees:
  - Joakim Flink (Karlskrona)
  - Mirce Popovski (Gothenburg)
- Fourth official: Per Melin (Solna)

MATCH RULES

- 90 minutes.
- 30 minutes of extra-time if necessary.
- Penalty shoot-out if scores still level.
- Seven named substitutes.
- Maximum of three substitutions.

== See also ==
- 2010 Svenska Cupen
