= 2010 in Swedish football =

The 2010 season in Swedish football, started January 2010 and ended December 2010:

== Honours ==
=== Official titles ===
| Title | Team | Reason |
|---|---|---|
| Swedish Champions 2010 | Malmö FF | Winners of Allsvenskan |
| Swedish Cup Champions 2010 | Helsingborgs IF | Winners of Svenska Cupen |
| Swedish Super Cup Champions 2010 | AIK | Winners of Supercupen |

=== Competitions ===
| Level | Competition | Team |
|---|---|---|
| 1st level | Allsvenskan 2010 | Malmö FF |
| 2nd level | Superettan 2010 | Syrianska FC |
| 3rd level | Division 1 Norra 2010 | Västerås SK |
| 3rd level | Division 1 Södra 2010 | IFK Värnamo |
| Cup | Svenska Cupen 2010 | Helsingborgs IF |
| Super Cup | Supercupen 2010 | AIK |

== Promotions, relegations and qualifications ==
=== Promotions ===
| Promoted from | Promoted to | Team | Reason |
|---|---|---|---|
| Superettan 2010 | Allsvenskan 2011 | Syrianska FC | Winners |
| Superettan 2010 | Allsvenskan 2011 | IFK Norrköping | 2nd team |
| Division 1 Norra 2010 | Superettan 2011 | Västerås SK | Winners |
| Division 1 Södra 2010 | Superettan 2011 | IFK Värnamo | Winners |
| Division 2 2010 | Division 1 2011 | IFK Luleå | Winners of group |
| Division 2 2010 | Division 1 2011 | IK Frej | Winners of group |
| Division 2 2010 | Division 1 2011 | Akropolis IF | Winners of group |
| Division 2 2010 | Division 1 2011 | Motala AIF | Winners of group |
| Division 2 2010 | Division 1 2011 | IK Oddevold | Winners of group |
| Division 2 2010 | Division 1 2011 | Varbergs BoIS | Winners of group |

=== Relegations ===
| Relegated from | Relegated to | Team | Reason |
|---|---|---|---|
| Allsvenskan 2010 | Superettan 2011 | Åtvidabergs FF | 15th team |
| Allsvenskan 2010 | Superettan 2011 | IF Brommapojkarna | 16th team |
| Superettan 2010 | Division 1 2011 | FC Trollhättan | 15th team |
| Superettan 2010 | Division 1 2011 | Väsby United | 16th team |
| Division 1 Norra 2010 | Division 2 2011 | Carlstad United | 12th team |
| Division 1 Norra 2010 | Division 2 2011 | Östersunds FK | 13th team |
| Division 1 Norra 2010 | Division 2 2011 | Arameiska-Syrianska Botkyrka IF | 14th team |
| Division 1 Södra 2010 | Division 2 2011 | Västra Frölunda IF | 12th team |
| Division 1 Södra 2010 | Division 2 2011 | Torslanda IK | 13th team |
| Division 1 Södra 2010 | Division 2 2011 | Ytterby IS | 14th team |

=== International qualifications ===
| Qualified for | Enters | Team | Reason |
|---|---|---|---|
| UEFA Champions League 2011–12 | 1st qual. round | Malmö FF | Winners of Allsvenskan |
| UEFA Europa League 2011–12 | 3rd qual. round | Helsingborgs IF | Winners of Svenska Cupen |
| UEFA Europa League 2011–12 | 2nd qual. round | Örebro SK | 3rd team in Allsvenskan |
| UEFA Europa League 2011–12 | 1st qual. round | IF Elfsborg | 4th team in Allsvenskan |

== Domestic results ==
=== 2010 Allsvenskan ===
Locations of the 2010 Allsvenskan teams

| Pos | Team | Pld | W | D | L | GF | GA | GD | Pts | Qualification or relegation |
|---|---|---|---|---|---|---|---|---|---|---|
| 1 | Malmö FF (C) | 30 | 21 | 4 | 5 | 59 | 24 | +35 | 67 | Qualification to Champions League second qualifying round |
| 2 | Helsingborgs IF | 30 | 20 | 5 | 5 | 49 | 26 | +23 | 65 | Qualification to Europa League third qualifying round (Note: Helsingborg qualified for the Third qualifying round of the Europa League as Svenska Cupen champions 2010.) |
| 3 | Örebro SK | 30 | 16 | 4 | 10 | 40 | 30 | +10 | 52 | Qualification to Europa League second qualifying round (Note: Örebro qualified for the Second qualifying round of the Europa League as they received Helsingborgs initial qualifying spot.) |
| 4 | IF Elfsborg | 30 | 12 | 11 | 7 | 55 | 40 | +15 | 47 | Qualification to Europa League first qualifying round (Note: Elfsborg qualified for the Europa League as they received Örebro's initial qualifying spot.) |
| 5 | Trelleborgs FF | 30 | 13 | 5 | 12 | 39 | 42 | −3 | 44 | |
| 6 | Mjällby AIF | 30 | 11 | 10 | 9 | 36 | 29 | +7 | 43 | |
| 7 | IFK Göteborg | 30 | 10 | 10 | 10 | 42 | 29 | +13 | 40 | |
| 8 | BK Häcken | 30 | 11 | 7 | 12 | 40 | 42 | −2 | 40 | Qualification to Europa League first qualifying round (Note: Sweden was among the best three associations in the UEFA Fair Play ranking and thus received an additional spot in the first qualifying round of the Europa League, Häcken received the qualifying spot for their ranking in Allsvenskans Fair Play ranking.) |
| 9 | Kalmar FF | 30 | 10 | 10 | 10 | 36 | 38 | −2 | 40 | |
| 10 | Djurgårdens IF | 30 | 11 | 7 | 12 | 35 | 42 | −7 | 40 | |
| 11 | AIK | 30 | 10 | 5 | 15 | 29 | 36 | −7 | 35 | |
| 12 | Halmstads BK | 30 | 10 | 5 | 15 | 31 | 42 | −11 | 35 | |
| 13 | GAIS | 30 | 8 | 8 | 14 | 24 | 35 | −11 | 32 | |
| 14 | Gefle IF (O) | 30 | 7 | 8 | 15 | 33 | 46 | −13 | 29 | Qualification to Relegation play-offs |
| 15 | Åtvidabergs FF (R) | 30 | 7 | 8 | 15 | 32 | 51 | −19 | 29 | Relegation to Superettan |
| 16 | IF Brommapojkarna (R) | 30 | 6 | 7 | 17 | 20 | 48 | −28 | 25 | Relegation to Superettan |

Source: svenskfotboll.se (in Swedish)
Rules for classification: 1) points; 2) goal difference; 3) number of goals scored.
(C) Champions; (O) Play-off winners; (R) Relegated

=== 2010 Allsvenskan qualification play-off ===
10 November 2010
18:45

| GIF Sundsvall | 0–1 | Gefle IF |
|---|---|---|
| | Report | Orlov 54' |

Norrporten Arena, Sundsvall
Attendance: 2,639
Referee: Michael Lerjéus
14 November 2010
17:30

| Gefle IF | 2–0 | GIF Sundsvall |
|---|---|---|
| Theorin 52' (pen.); Öhagen 80' |

Strömvallen, Gävle
Attendance: 4,318
Referee: Jonas Eriksson

=== 2010 Superettan ===
Location of the Superettan 2010 teams

| Pos | Team | Pld | W | D | L | GF | GA | GD | Pts | Promotion, qualification or relegation |
|---|---|---|---|---|---|---|---|---|---|---|
| 1 | Syrianska FC (C, P) | 30 | 16 | 8 | 6 | 46 | 27 | +19 | 56 | Promotion to Allsvenskan |
| 2 | IFK Norrköping (P) | 30 | 17 | 5 | 8 | 51 | 33 | +18 | 56 | Promotion to Allsvenskan |
| 3 | GIF Sundsvall | 30 | 13 | 12 | 5 | 56 | 39 | +17 | 51 | Qualification to Promotion playoffs |
| 4 | Assyriska FF | 30 | 13 | 7 | 10 | 48 | 42 | +6 | 46 | |
| 5 | Landskrona BoIS | 30 | 13 | 6 | 11 | 40 | 39 | +1 | 45 | |
| 6 | Ljungskile SK | 30 | 11 | 11 | 8 | 47 | 35 | +12 | 44 | |
| 7 | Falkenbergs FF | 30 | 11 | 11 | 8 | 46 | 34 | +12 | 44 | |
| 8 | Hammarby IF | 30 | 12 | 7 | 11 | 45 | 40 | +5 | 43 | |
| 9 | Örgryte IS (R) | 30 | 9 | 15 | 6 | 43 | 35 | +8 | 42 | Relegation to Division 1 (Note: Örgryte were relegated due to their Superettan licence being revoked after bankruptcy.) |
| 10 | Degerfors IF | 30 | 12 | 6 | 12 | 43 | 45 | −2 | 42 | |
| 11 | IK Brage | 30 | 11 | 8 | 11 | 36 | 38 | −2 | 41 | |
| 12 | Ängelholms FF | 30 | 9 | 10 | 11 | 39 | 39 | 0 | 37 | |
| 13 | Jönköpings Södra IF (O) | 30 | 9 | 9 | 12 | 40 | 47 | −7 | 36 | Qualification to Relegation playoffs |
| 14 | Östers IF (O) | 30 | 8 | 5 | 17 | 30 | 54 | −24 | 29 | Qualification to Relegation playoffs |
| 15 | FC Trollhättan (R) | 30 | 5 | 8 | 17 | 32 | 66 | −34 | 23 | Relegation to Division 1 |
| 16 | FC Väsby United (R) | 30 | 4 | 6 | 20 | 31 | 60 | −29 | 18 | Relegation to Division 1 |

Source: svenskfotboll.se (in Swedish)
Rules for classification: 1) points; 2) goal difference; 3) number of goals scored.
(C) Champions; (O) Play-off winners; (P) Promoted; (R) Relegated

=== 2010 Superettan qualification play-off ===
31 October 2010

| Sirius | 0–1 | Jönköpings Södra |

Studenternas IP, Uppsala
7 November 2010

| Jönköpings Södra | 3–0 | Sirius |

Stadsparksvallen, Jönköping
31 October 2010

| Qviding | 0–2 | Öster |

Valhalla IP, Gothenburg
6 November 2010

| Öster | 2–1 | Qviding |

Värendsvallen, Växjö

=== 2010 Division 1 Norra ===
| Pos | Team | Pld | W | D | L | GF | GA | GD | Pts | Promotion or relegation |
|---|---|---|---|---|---|---|---|---|---|---|
| 1 | Västerås SK (C, P) | 26 | 16 | 4 | 6 | 54 | 29 | +25 | 52 | Promotion to Superettan |
| 2 | IK Sirius | 26 | 14 | 5 | 7 | 46 | 24 | +22 | 47 | Qualification to Promotion playoffs |
| 3 | Syrianska IF Kerburan | 26 | 14 | 3 | 9 | 50 | 44 | +6 | 45 | |
| 4 | Hammarby Talang | 26 | 12 | 5 | 9 | 44 | 41 | +3 | 41 | |
| 5 | Vasalunds IF | 26 | 13 | 1 | 12 | 42 | 37 | +5 | 40 | |
| 6 | Dalkurd FF | 26 | 11 | 6 | 9 | 49 | 46 | +3 | 39 | |
| 7 | Umeå FC | 26 | 9 | 7 | 10 | 51 | 42 | +9 | 34 | |
| 8 | Gröndals IK (R) | 26 | 10 | 3 | 13 | 38 | 46 | −8 | 33 | Relegation to Division 6 |
| 9 | Valsta Syrianska IK | 26 | 9 | 5 | 12 | 36 | 45 | −9 | 32 | |
| 10 | Bodens BK | 26 | 9 | 5 | 12 | 35 | 59 | −24 | 32 | |
| 11 | BK Forward | 26 | 8 | 7 | 11 | 45 | 40 | +5 | 31 | |
| 12 | Carlstad United BK (R) | 26 | 9 | 4 | 13 | 28 | 38 | −10 | 31 | Relegation to Division 2 |
| 13 | Östersunds FK (R) | 26 | 9 | 3 | 14 | 30 | 43 | −13 | 30 | Relegation to Division 2 |
| 14 | Arameiska-Syrianska KIF (R) | 26 | 7 | 6 | 13 | 27 | 41 | −14 | 27 | Relegation to Division 2 |

Source: svenskfotboll.se (in Swedish)
Rules for classification: 1) points; 2) goal difference; 3) number of goals scored.
(C) Champions; (P) Promoted; (R) Relegated

=== 2010 Division 1 Södra ===
| Pos | Team | Pld | W | D | L | GF | GA | GD | Pts | Promotion or relegation |
|---|---|---|---|---|---|---|---|---|---|---|
| 1 | IFK Värnamo (C, P) | 26 | 16 | 4 | 6 | 57 | 30 | +27 | 52 | Promotion to Superettan |
| 2 | Qviding FIF | 26 | 15 | 6 | 5 | 44 | 22 | +22 | 51 | Qualification to Promotion playoffs |
| 3 | IF Sylvia | 26 | 14 | 6 | 6 | 51 | 33 | +18 | 48 | |
| 4 | IK Sleipner | 26 | 11 | 7 | 8 | 47 | 38 | +9 | 40 | |
| 5 | FC Rosengård | 26 | 11 | 7 | 8 | 51 | 45 | +6 | 40 | |
| 6 | Lunds BK | 26 | 10 | 9 | 7 | 36 | 25 | +11 | 39 | |
| 7 | IF Limhamn Bunkeflo | 26 | 8 | 12 | 6 | 38 | 36 | +2 | 36 | |
| 8 | Skövde AIK | 26 | 9 | 9 | 8 | 36 | 40 | −4 | 36 | |
| 9 | Norrby IF | 26 | 9 | 8 | 9 | 50 | 46 | +4 | 35 | |
| 10 | Kristianstads FF | 26 | 8 | 7 | 11 | 32 | 42 | −10 | 31 | |
| 11 | Husqvarna FF | 26 | 8 | 6 | 12 | 39 | 49 | −10 | 30 | |
| 12 | Västra Frölunda (R) | 26 | 6 | 8 | 12 | 28 | 47 | −19 | 26 | Relegation to Division 2 |
| 13 | Torslanda IK (R) | 26 | 5 | 3 | 18 | 29 | 52 | −23 | 18 | Relegation to Division 2 |
| 14 | Ytterby (R) | 26 | 4 | 4 | 18 | 30 | 63 | −33 | 16 | Relegation to Division 2 |

Source: svenskfotboll.se (in Swedish)
Rules for classification: 1) points; 2) goal difference; 3) number of goals scored.
(C) Champions; (P) Promoted; (R) Relegated

=== 2010 Svenska Cupen ===
Quarter-finals

9 July 2010
17:00

| AIK | 1–1 (a.e.t.) | Helsingborgs IF |
|---|---|---|
| Ljubojevic 33' | Report | Lindström 41' |
Penalties
| Johansson (penalty scored); Danielsson (penalty missed); Pavey (penalty scored); Flávio (penalty scored); Atta (penalty missed) | 3–4 | (penalty scored) Lindström; (penalty scored) Nilsson; (penalty scored) Makondele; (penalty missed) Gashi; (penalty scored) Andersson |

Råsunda Stadium, Solna
Attendance: 5,000
Referee: Martin Strömbergsson
10 July 2010
17:00

| Örebro SK | 0–3 | Mjällby AIF |
|---|---|---|
| | Report | Nicklasson 9'; El Kabir 89'; Gitselov 90' |

Behrn Arena, Örebro
Attendance: 1,856
Referee: Johan Hamlin
11 July 2010
17:00

| Kalmar FF | 3–1 (a.e.t.) | Gefle IF |
|---|---|---|
| Santos 31'; Rydström 105'; Bertilsson 110' | Report | Lantto 15' |

Fredriksskans, Kalmar
Attendance: 1,235
Referee: Martin Hansson
21 July 2010
19:00

| Hammarby IF | 2–2 (a.e.t.) | IF Brommapojkarna |
|---|---|---|
| Castro-Tello 23' (pen.); Hallenius 45' | Report | Segerström 13', 81' |
Penalties
| Monteiro (penalty missed); Castro-Tello (penalty scored); Hallenius (penalty scored); Sema (penalty scored); Törnstrand (penalty scored); Helg (penalty scored) | 5–4 | (penalty scored) Runnemo; (penalty scored) Segerström; (penalty missed) Piñones-Arce; (penalty scored) Aryanci; (penalty scored) Stefanidis; (penalty missed) Petrović |

Söderstadion, Stockholm
Attendance: 5,247
Referee: Magnus Ahlsén

Semi-finals

27 October 2010
19:00

| Hammarby IF | 2–2 (a.e.t.) | Kalmar FF |
|---|---|---|
| Törnstrand 26'; Castro-Tello 43' | Report | Sobralense 76'; Israelsson 83' |
Penalties
| Dahl (penalty missed); Castro-Tello (penalty scored); Malke (penalty scored); Sema (penalty scored); Törnstrand (penalty missed); Gustafsson (penalty scored) | 4–3 | (penalty missed) Rydström; (penalty missed) Vieira; (penalty scored) Sacramento; (penalty scored) Sobralense; (penalty scored) Ålander; (penalty missed) Arajuuri |

Söderstadion, Stockholm
Attendance: 6,728
Referee: Tobias Mattsson
28 October 2010
19:00

| Helsingborgs IF | 2–0 | Mjällby AIF |
|---|---|---|
| Sundin 63'; Holgersson 78' | Report |

Olympia, Helsingborg
Attendance: 4,466
Referee: Michael Lerjéus

Final

13 November 2010
16:00

| Hammarby IF | 0–1 | Helsingborgs IF |
|---|---|---|
| | | Jönsson 80' |

Söderstadion, Stockholm
Attendance: 12,357
Referee: Daniel Stålhammar

=== 2010 Supercupen ===
Final

6 March 2010
16:00 CEST

| AIK | 1–0 | IFK Göteborg |
|---|---|---|
| Antônio Flávio 22' | Report |

Råsunda, Stockholm
Attendance: 2,537
Referee: Markus Strömbergsson

== National team results ==
20 January 2010
19:30 UTC+4
Friendly
№ 920

| Oman | 0–1 | Sweden |
|---|---|---|
| | Report | Svensson 35' |

Seeb Stadium, Muscat
Attendance: 1,000
Referee: Nawaf Shukr Allah (Bahrain)
23 January 2010
15:00 UTC+3
Friendly
№ 921

| Syria | 1–1 | Sweden |
|---|---|---|
| Rafe 5' | Report | Ranégie 87' |

Abbasiyyin Stadium, Damascus
Attendance: 10,000
Referee: Talaam Najm (Lebanon)
3 March 2010
19:45 UTC 0
Friendly
№ 922

| Wales | 0–1 | Sweden |
|---|---|---|
| | Report | Elmander 44' |

Liberty Stadium, Swansea
Attendance: 8,258
Referee: Alan Black (Northern Ireland)
29 May 2010
19:00 UTC+2
Friendly
№ 923

| Sweden | 4–2 | Bosnia and Herzegovina |
|---|---|---|
| Toivonen 44'; M. Olsson 68', 83'; Berg 90+2' | Report | Salihović 47'; Zec 90' |

Råsunda Stadium, Solna
Attendance: 22,589
Referee: Manuel Gräfe (Germany)
2 June 2010
19:30 UTC+2
Friendly
№ 924

| Belarus | 0–1 | Sweden |
|---|---|---|
| | Report | Wilhelmsson 47' |

Dynama Stadium, Minsk
Attendance: 12,000
Referee: Aleksej Nikolajev (Russia)
11 August 2010
20:00 UTC+2
Friendly
№ 925

| Sweden | 3–0 | Scotland |
|---|---|---|
| Ibrahimović 4'; Bajrami 39'; Toivonen 56' | Report |

Råsunda Stadium, Solna
Attendance: 25,249
Referee: Gianluca Rocchi (Italy)
3 September 2010
20:00 UTC+2
Euro 2012 qualification
№ 926

| Sweden | 2–0 | Hungary |
|---|---|---|
| Wernbloom 51', 73' | Report |

Råsunda Stadium, Solna
Attendance: 32,304
Referee: Martin Atkinson (England)
7 September 2010
20:00 UTC+2
Euro 2012 qualification
№ 927

| Sweden | 6–0 | San Marino |
|---|---|---|
| Ibrahimović 7', 77'; D. Simoncini 12' (o.g.); A. Simoncini 26' (o.g.); Granqvist 51'; Berg 90+3' | Report |

Swedbank Stadion, Malmö
Attendance: 21,083
Referee: David McKeon (Republic of Ireland)
12 October 2010
20:30 UTC+2
Euro 2012 qualification
№ 928

| Netherlands | 4–1 | Sweden |
|---|---|---|
| Huntelaar 4', 55'; Afellay 37', 59' | Report | Granqvist 69' |

Amsterdam Arena, Amsterdam
Referee: Stéphane Lannoy (France)
17 November 2010
20:30 UTC+2
Friendly
№ 929

| Sweden | 0–0 | Germany |
|---|---|---|
| | Report |

Ullevi, Gothenburg
Attendance: 21,959
Referee: Carlos Velasco Carballo (Spain)
