= 2010 Helsingborgs IF season =

Helsingborgs IF
2010 season
- Manager: Conny Karlsson
- Allsvenskan: 2nd
- Svenska Cupen: Champions
- Top goalscorer: Alexander Gerndt (12)

Helsingborgs IF had its best season in a decade, being only two points off arch rivals and champions Malmö FF. With senior talisman Henrik Larsson retiring and Conny Karlsson being an unexpected coaching appointment to a midfield side, inspired signings such as Alexander Gerndt, Mattias Lindström, Erik Edman and Ardian Gashi lifted the team so far that they actually led the championship (albeit with Malmö having a game in hand) just a week before the end of the season. In the end, Malmö won the required matches, while Helsingborg choked and drew with Kalmar, a double-whammy that secured Malmö's title.

As consolation, Helsingborg was able to win Svenska Cupen, thanks to a late goal in a tense final against second flight-team Hammarby.

== Squad ==
=== Goalkeepers ===
- (Sweden) Pär Hansson
- (Sweden) Oscar Berglund

=== Defenders ===
- (Sweden) Erik Edman
- (Sweden) Marcus Holgersson
- (Sweden) Abdul Khalili
- (Sweden) Christoffer Andersson
- (Sweden) Erik Wahlstedt
- (Sweden) Marcus Nilsson
- (Sweden) Fredrik Liverstam
- (Sweden) Robin Bok
- (Sweden) Joseph Baffo
- (Sweden) Joel Ekstrand

=== Midfielders ===
- (Finland) Hannu Patronen
- (South Africa) May Mahlangu
- (Norway) Ardian Gashi
- (Sweden) Mattias Lindström
- (Sweden) Erik Sundin
- (Sweden) Marcus Lantz
- (Democratic Republic of the Congo) (Sweden) René Makondele
- (Sweden) Johan Eiswold
- (Sweden) Christian Eliasson
- (Sweden) Lukas Ohlander

=== Attackers ===
- (Sweden) Rasmus Jönsson
- (Sweden) Alexander Gerndt
- (Netherlands) Rachid Bouaouzan
- (Sweden) Mohammed Ramadan
- (Brazil) Rafael Porcellis

== Allsvenskan ==
=== Matches ===
- Helsingborg-Brommapojkarna 1-0
- 1-0 Mattias Lindström 90'
- Djurgården-Helsingborg 0-1
- 0-1 Rasmus Jönsson 2'
- Helsingborg-IFK Göteborg 2-0
- 1-0 Mattias Lindström 29'
- 2-0 Marcus Nilsson 37'
- Trelleborg-Helsingborg 0-0
- Helsingborg-Elfsborg 2-1
- 1-0 Ardian Gashi 47'
- 1-1 Denni Avdić 61'
- 2-1 Marcus Holgersson 63'
- Åtvidaberg-Helsingborg 0-3
- 0-1 Christoffer Andersson 36'
- 0-2 Christoffer Andersson 46'
- 0-3 Erik Sundin 89'
- Helsingborg-Malmö FF 2-1
- 0-1 Wílton Figueiredo 4' (pen.)
- 1-1 Ardian Gashi 9'
- 2-1 Marcus Nilsson 22'
- Mjällby-Helsingborg 0-1
- 0-1 Erik Sundin 34'
- Helsingborg-AIK 1-0
- 1-0 Mattias Lindström 37'
- GAIS-Helsingborg 0-0
- Helsingborg-Örebro 2-1
- 1-0 Christoffer Andersson 11'
- 2-0 Rasmus Jönsson 17'
- 2-1 Paulinho Guará 62'
- Gefle-Helsingborg 1-3
- 1-0 Alexander Gerndt 50'
- 1-1 May Mahlangu 78'
- 1-2 Joel Ekstrand 83'
- 1-3 Marcus Lantz 88' (pen.)
- Kalmar FF-Helsingborg 1-0
- 1-0 Daniel Mendes 2'
- Helsingborg-Halmstad 2-1
- 1-0 Ardian Gashi 7'
- 1-1 Tommy Jönsson 31'
- 2-1 Ardian Gashi 67'
- Häcken-Helsingborg 2-1
- 1-0 Mathias Ranégie 30'
- 1-1 Christoffer Andersson 41'
- 2-1 Paulinho 82'
- Helsingborg-Häcken 3-1
- 0-1 Mattias Östberg 12'
- 1-1 Erik Sundin 29'
- 2-1 Erik Sundin 61'
- 3-1 Marcus Holgersson 73'
- Brommapojkarna-Helsingborg 1-3
- 1-0 Babis Stefanidis 2'
- 1-1 Rasmus Jönsson 49'
- 1-2 Christoffer Andersson 52'
- 1-3 Ardian Gashi 53'
- Helsingborg-Djurgården 3-3
- 0-1 Kennedy Igboananike 42'
- 1-1 Alexander Gerndt 53'
- 2-1 Alexander Gerndt 57'
- 2-2 Mattias Jonson 65'
- 2-3 Sharbel Touma 69'
- 3-3 Alexander Gerndt 90'
- IFK Göteborg-Helsingborg 0-0
- Helsingborg-Trelleborg 1-0
- 1-0 Alexander Gerndt 10'
- Örebro-Helsingborg 3-0
- 1-0 Magnus Wikström 6'
- 2-0 Magnus Kihlberg 35'
- 3-0 Markus Astvald 79'
- Helsingborg-Gefle 3-1
- 1-0 Alexander Gerndt 15'
- 2-0 Alexander Gerndt 59'
- 2-1 Yussif Chibsah 78'
- 3-1 Alexander Gerndt 80'
- Malmö FF-Helsingborg 2-0
- 1-0 Dardan Rexhepi 17'
- 2-0 Wílton Figueiredo 90'
- Helsingborg-Mjällby 2-1
- 1-0 Alexander Gerndt 17'
- 2-0 Alexander Gerndt 26' (pen.)
- 2-1 Patrik Rosengren 90'
- AIK-Helsingborg 2-3
- 1-0 Mohamed Bangura 18'
- 1-1 Erik Sundin 44'
- 1-2 Rasmus Jönsson 75'
- 2-2 Marcus Nilsson 77' (o.g.)
- 2-3 Christoffer Andersson 81'
- Helsingborg-GAIS 0-1
- 0-1 Romarinho 27'
- Elfsborg-Helsingborg 1-3
- 0-1 May Mahlangu 11'
- 1-1 Mathias Florén 45'
- 1-2 Erik Sundin 58'
- 1-3 Erik Sundin 73'
- Helsingborg-Åtvidaberg 3-0
- 1-0 Alexander Gerndt 7'
- 2-0 Alexander Gerndt 19'
- 3-0 Erik Sundin 68'
- Halmstad-Helsingborg 2-4
- 0-1 Rasmus Jönsson 18'
- 0-2 May Mahlangu 23'
- 0-3 Alexander Gerndt 64' (pen.)
- 0-4 Rasmus Jönsson 66'
- 1-4 Anselmo 83'
- 2-4 Anselmo 87' (pen.)
- Helsingborg-Kalmar FF 0-0

=== Topscorers ===
- (Sweden) Alexander Gerndt 12
- (Sweden) Erik Sundin 8
- (Sweden) Rasmus Jönsson 6
- (Norway) Ardian Gashi 4
- (Sweden) Mattias Lindström 3
