= 2011 Svenska Supercupen =

- Event: Svenska Supercupen
Malmö FF	Helsingborgs IF
1	2
- Date: 19 March 2011
- Venue: Swedbank Stadion, Malmö
- Referee: Markus Strömbergsson (Gävle)
- Attendance: 10,362

2011 Svenska Supercupen (Swedish Super Cup 2011) was the 5th edition of Svenska Supercupen annual football match that 2010 Supercupen winners Helsingborgs IF successfully defended its 2011 Supercupen against league winners Malmö FF, 2-1. The match was staged on 19 March 2011 at Swedbank Stadion, Malmö. The Supercupen match was Malmö FF's first appearance and Helsingborgs IF's second since its creation in 2007. Helsingborgs IF's Erik Sundin scored the winning goal in the 90th minute.

== Match facts ==
19 March 2011
15:30 CET

Malmö FF	1–2	Helsingborg IF
Figueiredo 16'	Report	Nilsson 2'; Sundin 90'

Swedbank Stadion, Malmö
Attendance: 10,362
Referee: Markus Strömbergsson (Gävle)

Malmö FF	Helsingborgs IF

MALMÖ FF:
GK	25	(Czech Republic) Dušan Melichárek
RB	2	(Denmark) Ulrich Vinzents
CB	16	(Portugal) Yago Fernández	(yellow card) 36'
CB	8	(Sweden) Daniel Andersson (c)
LB	20	(Brazil) Ricardinho
RM	26	(Sweden) Jiloan Hamad
CM	9	(Brazil) Wílton Figueiredo	(yellow card) 17'
CM	11	(Sweden) Jeffrey Aubynn	(red card) 82'
LM	21	(Sweden) Jimmy Durmaz	(substituted off) 72'
FW	24	(Sweden) Agon Mehmeti
FW	7	(Sweden) Daniel Larsson	(substituted off) 84'
Substitutes:
GK	30	(Sweden) Dejan Garača
DF	15	(Sweden) Pontus Jansson
DF	22	(Sweden) Filip Stenström
MF	5	(Serbia) Miljan Mutavdžić	(substituted in) 84'
MF	14	(Sweden) Guillermo Molins	(substituted in) 72'
MF	18	(Sweden) Amin Nazari
FW	19	(Sweden) Dardan Rexhepi
Manager:
(Sweden) Roland Nilsson

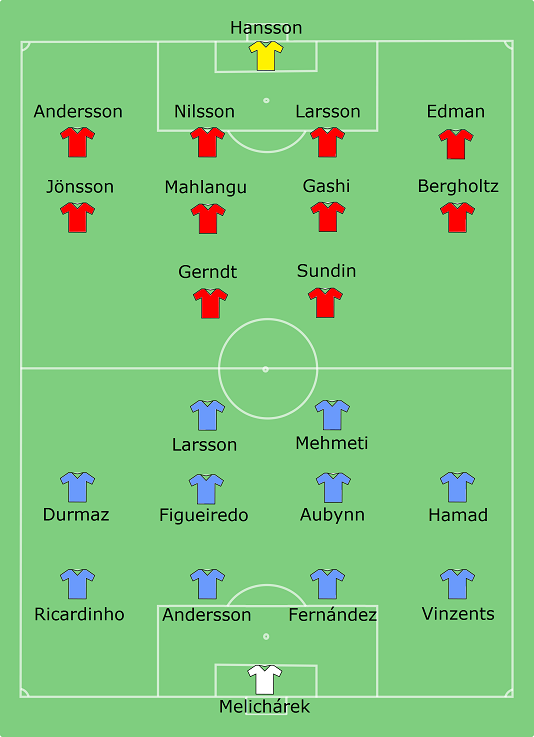

HELSINGBORGS IF:
GK	30	(Sweden) Pär Hansson (c)
RB	21	(Sweden) Christoffer Andersson
CB	24	(Sweden) Marcus Nilsson
CB	26	(Sweden) Peter Larsson
LB	14	(Sweden) Erik Edman	(yellow card) 33'
RM	19	(Sweden) Rasmus Jönsson	(substituted off) 83'
CM	6	(South Africa) May Mahlangu
CM	8	(Norway) Ardian Gashi	(yellow card) 82'
LM	4	(Sweden) Marcus Bergholtz	(substituted off) 66'
FW	10	(Sweden) Alexander Gerndt
FW	9	(Sweden) Erik Sundin	(yellow card) 90'	(substituted off) 90'
Substitutes:
GK	1	(Sweden) Daniel Andersson
DF	15	(Sweden) Markus Holgersson	(substituted in) 90'
DF	23	(Sweden) Erik Wahlstedt
MF	7	(Sweden) Mattias Lindström	(substituted in) 83'
MF	13	(Netherlands) Rachid Bouaouzan	(substituted in) 66'
MF	27	(Sweden) Johan Eiswohld
MF	28	(Sweden) Simon Thern
Manager:
(Sweden) Conny Karlsson

MATCH OFFICIALS

- Assistant referees:
  - Joakim Flink (Karlskrona)
  - Mehmet Culum (Malmö)
- Fourth official: Andreas Ekberg (Malmö)

MATCH RULES

- 90 minutes.
- 30 minutes of extra-time if necessary.
- Penalty shoot-out if scores still level.
- Seven named substitutes.
- Maximum of three substitutions.

== See also ==
- 2010 Allsvenskan
- 2010 Svenska Cupen
