= 2010 Svenska Cupen =

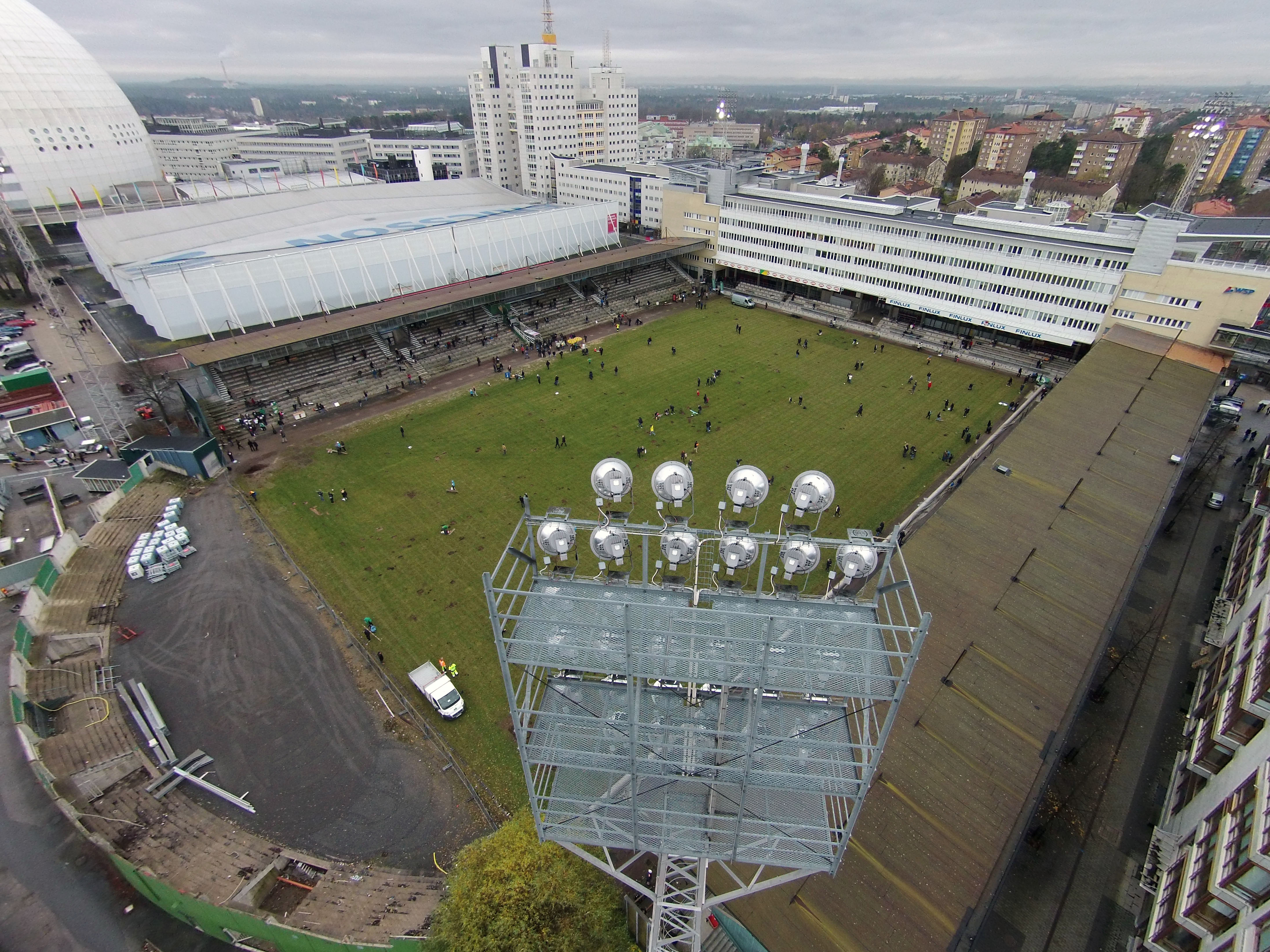

Tournament details
- Country: Sweden
- Teams: 98

Final positions
- Champions: Helsingborgs IF
- Runners-up: Hammarby IF

Tournament statistics
- Matches played: 97

The 2010 Svenska Cupen was the 55th season of the main Swedish football Cup. AIK were the defending champions.

== Preliminary round ==
52 teams from Division 1 2010 or lower of the Swedish league pyramid competed in this round.

Team 1	Score	Team 2
3 March 2010
Lilla Träslövs FF	1–5	Ramlösa Södra FF
6 March 2010
Lilla Edets IF	1–2	Torslanda IK
Notvikens IK	1–3	Umedalens IF
11 March 2010
IFK Uddevalla	1–2	Holmalunds IF
13 March 2010
Skärblacka IF	0–3	Nyköpings BIS
17 March 2010
Morön BK	0–7	Bodens BK
Ängby IF	2–5	Värmdö IF
19 March 2010
Matfors IF	0–2	Friska Viljor FC
FC Innerstan	2–3	Myresjö IF
20 March 2010
IFK Klagshamn	1–0	Kristianstads FF
IFK Falköping FF	0–2	Norrby IF
Akropolis IF	3–2	Gamla Upsala SK
Åsebro IF	0–2	Utsiktens BK
Karlstad BK	1–2	Skövde AIK
Råå IF	2–4	IFK Hässleholm
Kalmar AIK	1–4	Sölvesborgs GoIF
Sörskogens IF	0–4	Enskede IK
Rynninge IK	0–1	Värmbols FC
Oskarshamns AIK	9–0	Tannefors IF
21 March 2010
FC Gute	0–2	Gröndals IK
Svedala IF	1–2	IS Halmia
Kungsbacka IF	0–2	Gunnilse IS
Mariedals IK	3–1	Fässbergs IF
23 March 2010
Vallentuna BK	0–1	IK Frej
24 March 2010
Kvarnsvedens IK	2–5	Sandvikens IF
Unik FK	1–4	Hudiksvalls ABK

== Round 1 ==
Twelve teams from Division 1 2010 or lower, two of the three teams which earned promotion to 2010 Superettan (not IK Brage) and the bottom eight teams from 2009 Superettan entered in this round. They were joined by the 26 preliminary round winners.

Team 1	Score	Team 2
18 March 2010
Ramlösa Södra FF	4–6	FC Rosengård
27 March 2010
Gröndals IK	1–3	Väsby United
Skövde AIK	4–5	Degerfors IF
Umedalens IF	4–0	Bodens BK
Norrby IF	1–3	Jönköpings Södra IF
IFK Klagshamn	1–3	IF Limhamn/Bunkeflo
Nyköpings BIS	2–5	BK Forward
Akropolis IF	2–3	Hammarby TFF
IS Halmia	0–1	Lunds BK
Sölvesborgs GoIF	0–2	Östers IF
Mariedals IK	0–4	Utsiktens BK
IFK Hässleholm	0–1	IFK Värnamo
28 March 2010
Oskarshamns AIK	2–1	Tenhults IF
Gunnilse IS	1–2	Ljungskile SK
Myresjö IF	1–3	IFK Norrköping
Värmbols FC	2–0	Carlstad United BK
Sandvikens IF	4–6	Dalkurd FF
Värmdö IF	3–2	Vasalunds IF
Hudiksvalls ABK	0–2	IK Sirius
Friska Viljor FC	1–6	Östersunds FK
30 March 2010
Torslanda IK	1–2	Qviding FIF
IK Frej	0–4	Västerås SK
31 March 2010
Holmalunds IF	0–1	FC Trollhättan
Enskede IK	0–2	Valsta Syrianska IK

== Round 2 ==
Two demoted teams from 2009 Allsvenskan and six teams ranked 3rd through 8th in 2009 Superettan entered in this round, joining 24 winners from Round 1.

Team 1	Score	Team 2
7 April 2010
Oskarshamns AIK	1–4	Östers IF
9 April 2010
IK Sirius	2–3	GIF Sundsvall
FC Rosengård	2–3 (aet)	Ängelholms FF
11 April 2010
Umedalens IF	1–7	Östersunds FK
14 April 2010
Hammarby TFF	1–0	Assyriska FF
17 April 2010
Värmdö IF	2–3 (aet)	Hammarby IF
18 April 2010
Värmbols FC	2–3	Jönköpings Södra IF
21 April 2010
BK Forward	1–4	Degerfors IF
Dalkurd FF	1–2 (aet)	Väsby United
IF Limhamn/Bunkeflo	1–0	Landskrona BoIS
Lunds BK	1–5	Falkenbergs FF
IFK Värnamo	1–2 (aet)	Örgryte IS
Qviding FIF	1–2	Ljungskile SK
Utsiktens BK	2–3	FC Trollhättan
Valsta Syrianska IK	1–2	Syrianska FC
22 April 2010
Västerås SK	1–2	IFK Norrköping

== Round 3 ==
Sixteen teams from 2010 Allsvenskan entered in this round, and joined the 16 winners of Round 2.

Team 1	Score	Team 2
18 May 2010
Ängelholms FF	1–0	Halmstads BK
IF Limhamn/Bunkeflo	0–1	Mjällby AIF
Ljungskile SK	2–0	Djurgårdens IF
Syrianska FC	0–1 (aet)	Malmö FF
19 May 2010
Hammarby TFF	1–3	Helsingborgs IF
FC Trollhättan	0–3	Kalmar FF
Jönköpings Södra IF	2–1 (aet)	Åtvidabergs FF
Väsby United	0–2	IFK Göteborg
Östersunds FK	0–5	BK Häcken
Degerfors IF	0–2	IF Elfsborg
Falkenbergs FF	0–3	IF Brommapojkarna
25 May 2010
Örgryte IS	0–1	Gefle IF
IFK Norrköping	0–2 (aet)	Örebro SK
Östers IF	1–3 (aet)	AIK
GIF Sundsvall	1–2 (aet)	GAIS
3 June 2010
Hammarby IF	3–1	Trelleborgs FF

== Round 4 ==
The sixteen winning teams from round 3.

Team 1	Score	Team 2
27 June 2010
Ljungskile SK	0–1	Gefle IF
IFK Göteborg	3–4 (aet)	Kalmar FF
1 July 2010
Hammarby IF	3–1	IF Elfsborg
2 July 2010
Jönköpings Södra IF	0–2	Örebro SK
4 July 2010
GAIS	0–0 (aet); 3–4 (p)	IF Brommapojkarna
Mjällby AIF	4–1	Malmö FF
5 July 2010
Ängelholms FF	1–2 (aet)	AIK
Helsingborgs IF	2–1	BK Häcken

== Quarter-finals ==
9 July 2010	AIK	1–1 (a.e.t.) (3–4 p)	Helsingborgs IF	Solna
17:00	Ljubojevic 33'	Report	Lindström 41'	Stadium: Råsunda Stadium; Attendance: 5,000; Referee: Martin Strömbergsson
	Penalties
	Johansson (penalty scored); Danielsson (penalty missed); Pavey (penalty scored); Flávio (penalty scored); Atta (penalty missed)		(penalty scored) Lindström; (penalty scored) Nilsson; (penalty scored) Makondele; (penalty missed) Gashi; (penalty scored) Andersson

10 July 2010	Örebro SK	0–3	Mjällby AIF	Örebro
17:00		Report	Nicklasson 9'; El Kabir 89'; Gitselov 90'	Stadium: Behrn Arena; Attendance: 1,856; Referee: Johan Hamlin

11 July 2010	Kalmar FF	3–1 (a.e.t.)	Gefle IF	Kalmar
17:00	Santos 31'; Rydström 105'; Bertilsson 110'	Report	Lantto 15'	Stadium: Fredriksskans; Attendance: 1,235; Referee: Martin Hansson

21 July 2010	Hammarby IF	2–2 (a.e.t.) (5–4 p)	IF Brommapojkarna	Stockholm
19:00	Castro-Tello 23' (pen.); Hallenius 45'	Report	Segerström 13', 81'	Stadium: Söderstadion; Attendance: 5,247; Referee: Magnus Ahlsén
	Penalties
	Monteiro (penalty missed); Castro-Tello (penalty scored); Hallenius (penalty scored); Sema (penalty scored); Törnstrand (penalty scored); Helg (penalty scored)		(penalty scored) Runnemo; (penalty scored) Segerström; (penalty missed) Piñones-Arce; (penalty scored) Aryanci; (penalty scored) Stefanidis; (penalty missed) Petrović

== Semi-finals ==
27 October 2010	Hammarby IF	2–2 (a.e.t.) (4–3 p)	Kalmar FF	Stockholm
19:00	Törnstrand 26'; Castro-Tello 43'	Report	Sobralense 76'; Israelsson 83'	Stadium: Söderstadion; Attendance: 6,728; Referee: Tobias Mattsson
	Penalties
	Dahl (penalty missed); Castro-Tello (penalty scored); Malke (penalty scored); Sema (penalty scored); Törnstrand (penalty missed); Gustafsson (penalty scored)		(penalty missed) Rydström; (penalty missed) Vieira; (penalty scored) Sacramento; (penalty scored) Sobralense; (penalty scored) Ålander; (penalty missed) Arajuuri

28 October 2010	Helsingborgs IF	2–0	Mjällby AIF	Helsingborg
19:00	Sundin 63'; Holgersson 78'	Report		Stadium: Olympia; Attendance: 4,466; Referee: Michael Lerjéus

== Final ==
13 November 2010
16:00

Hammarby IF	0–1	Helsingborgs IF
		Jönsson 80'

Söderstadion, Stockholm
Attendance: 12,357
Referee: Daniel Stålhammar
