= Värmdö =

Värmdö can mean:

- Värmdö Municipality, a municipality of Stockholm County in Sweden, named after the island of Värmdö but including many other islands
- Värmdö (island), a large island in eastern Sweden, shared between Värmdö Municipality and Nacka Municipality
- Värmdö IF, an association football club based in Värmdö Municipality
