= LiU AIF =

Swedish football club

LiU AIF FK
- Full name: Linköping Universitets Akademiska Idrottsförening Fotbollklubb
- Ground: Stångebro; Linköping; Sweden
- Coach: Gagan Askling
- League: Swedish football Division 5
Home colours

LiU AIF FK is a Swedish football club located in Linköping.

== Background ==
LiU AIF FK currently plays in Division 4 Östergötland Västra which is the sixth tier of Swedish football. They play their home matches at Stångebro in Linköping. The club was previously known as FC Innerstan.

LiU AIF FK are affiliated to Östergötlands Fotbollförbund. FC Innerstan played in the 2010 Svenska Cupen but lost 2–3 at home to Myresjö IF in the preliminary round.

== Season to season ==
Season	Level	Division	Section	Position	Movements
2008	Tier 8	Division 6	Östergötland Södra	3rd	FC Innerstan
2009	Tier 8	Division 6	Östergötland Södra	1st	FC Innerstan – Promoted
2010	Tier 7	Division 5	Östergötland Mellersta	1st	FC Innerstan – Promoted
2011	Tier 6	Division 4	Östergötland Västra		

* League restructuring in 2006 resulted in a new division being created at Tier 3 and subsequent divisions dropping a level.
