= Erik Edman =

Swedish footballer (born 1978)

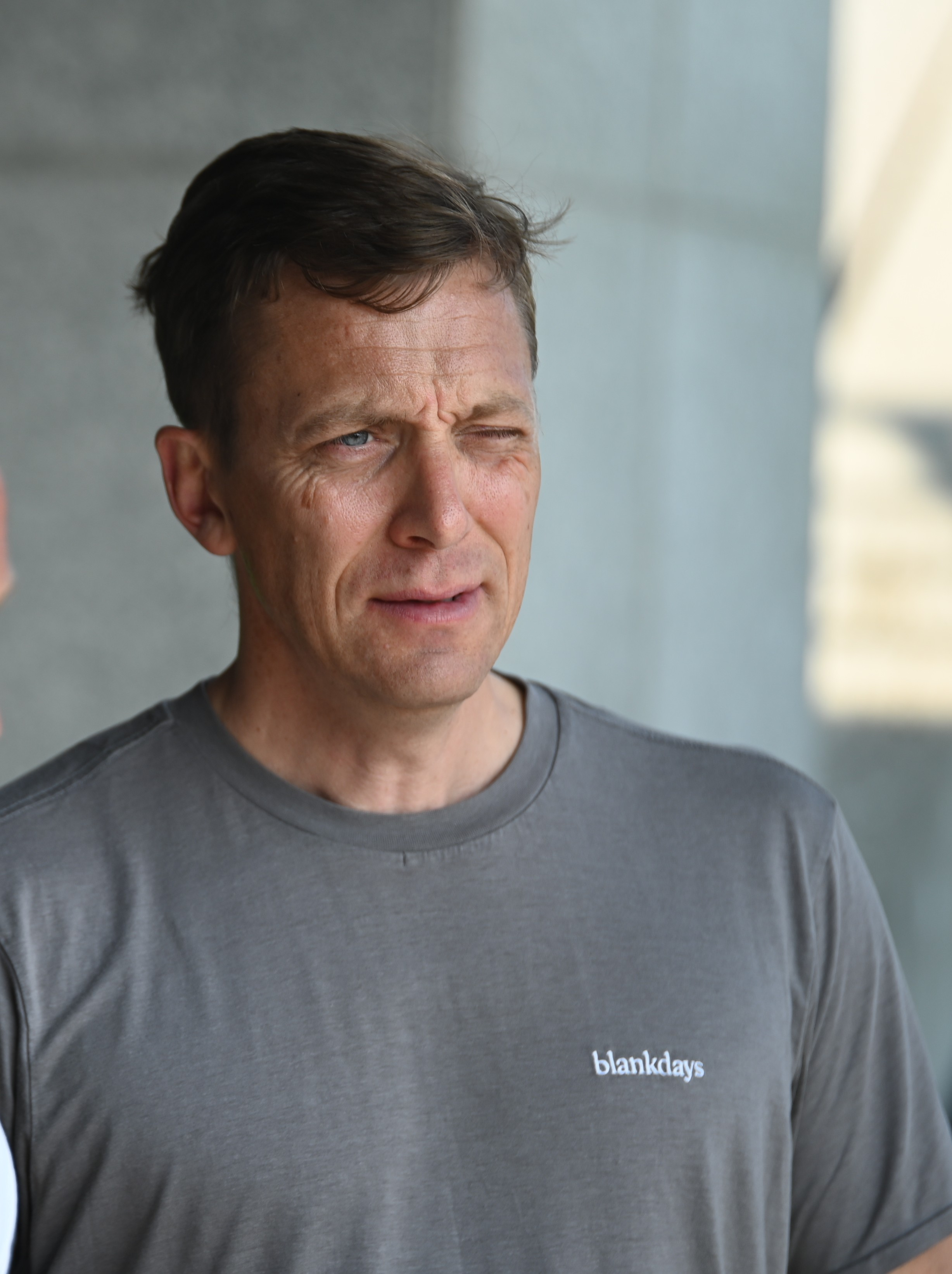
- Edman in 2026

Personal information
- Full name: Erik Kenneth Edman
- Date of birth: 11 November 1978 (age 47)
- Place of birth: Jönköping, Sweden
- Height: 1.79 m (5 ft 10 in)
- Position: Defender

Youth career
- Habo IF
- Helsingborgs IF

Senior career*
Years	Team	Apps	(Gls)
1997–1999	Helsingborgs IF	61	(1)
1999–2000	Torino	0	(0)
2000	Karlsruher SC	8	(0)
2000–2001	AIK	21	(0)
2001–2004	Heerenveen	91	(1)
2004–2005	Tottenham Hotspur	31	(1)
2005–2008	Rennes	56	(0)
2008–2010	Wigan Athletic	10	(0)
2010–2013	Helsingborgs IF	51	(0)
Total		329	(3)

International career
1993–1994	Sweden U16	22	(0)
1995–1996	Sweden U18	10	(0)
1997–1999	Sweden U21	19	(0)
2001–2009	Sweden	57	(1)
- * Club domestic league appearances and goals

Erik Kenneth Edman (Swedish pronunciation: [ˈêːrɪk ˈěːdman]; born 11 November 1978) is a Swedish former professional footballer who played as a defender. Starting off his career with Helsingborgs IF in 1997, he went on to represent clubs in Italy, Germany, the Netherlands, England, and France before retiring at Helsingborg in 2013. A full international between 2001 and 2009, he won 57 caps for the Sweden national team and represented his country at the 2002 FIFA World Cup, UEFA Euro 2004, and the 2006 FIFA World Cup.

== Club career ==
=== Early career ===
Edman played for a number of clubs during his career. He played for Helsingborgs IF until 1999, which was his first time leaving Sweden and moved abroad. In 2001, after having unremarkable spells at Italian club Torino and Karlsruher SC in Germany, Edman returned to Sweden and joined AIK for one season. After that, Heerenveen in the Netherlands brought Edman from Sweden.

=== Tottenham Hotspur ===
In July 2004, Tottenham Hotspur signed Edman from Heerenveen. Edman quickly established himself at the club, and will probably be best remembered at Spurs for his stunning goal, which he scored from 41 yards out, in the Premier League match against Liverpool in April 2005. However, in the summer of 2005, the arrival of South Korean left back, Lee Young-Pyo, led Edman to make the decision to leave England.

=== Rennes ===
In the last week of August, Spurs accepted an offer from French club Rennes. It did not take long for Edman to impress his new manager, László Bölöni, and once again established himself as first choice at left-back.

=== Wigan Athletic ===
In January 2008, Edman was signed by Wigan Athletic for a transfer fee of £500,000. The arrival of Edman was a good deal for Wigan Athletic, since the club did not find a good replacement after the departure of Leighton Baines, the previous summer. In March 2008, Edman was injured in a match against Blackburn Rovers, damaging his anterior cruciate ligament in his knee. This means he missed the rest of Wigan's season, as well as Euro 2008. Edman made his return to the Wigan team, as a substitute in January 2009 at Old Trafford, as Wigan lost 1–0 to Manchester United. However, he has lacked playing time, due to injuries and Maynor Figueroa's impressive performances throughout the season, which have earned him a spot in Roberto Martínez's starting eleven. Edman played his last game in the Latics' 9–1 loss against Tottenham Hotspur in November, where he had a torrid time against Aaron Lennon.

=== Helsingborgs IF ===
On 5 February 2010, Helsingborgs IF confirmed that they had re-signed Edman. Edman signed a five-year contract with the Swedish club. In December 2012 it was announced Edman would take up a coaching position at Helsingborgs IF.

== International career ==
Edman was a part of the Sweden national team setup from 2001 until 2009. In 2002, he was part of Sweden's 2002 World Cup squad, but did not make any appearances. He then began to feature more regularly for Sweden after the 2002 World Cup, and at Euro 2004 and the 2006 World Cup, he featured as a starting left back for the team.

He scored his first and only goal, a free kick, in a 2006 World Cup qualifier against Bulgaria at the Vasil Levski National Stadium in March 2005.

Edman missed UEFA Euro 2008 due to a serious knee injury. He retired from the national team the following year.

== Career statistics ==
Appearances and goals by national team and year
National team	Year	Apps	Goals
Sweden
Sweden	2001	2	0
Sweden	2002	5	0
Sweden	2003	9	0
Sweden	2004	11	0
Sweden	2005	7	1
Sweden	2006	12	0
Sweden	2007	9	0
Sweden	2008	0	0
Sweden	2009	2	0
Total		57	1

Scores and results list Sweden's goal tally first, score column indicates score after each Edman goal.

List of international goals scored by Erik Edman
No.	Date	Venue	Opponent	Score	Result	Competition
1	26 March 2005	Vasil Levski National Stadium, Sofia, Bulgaria	Bulgaria	2–0	3–0	2006 FIFA World Cup qualifier

== Honours ==
Helsingborgs IF

- Allsvenskan: 1999, 2011
- Svenska Cupen: 1998, 2010, 2011
- Svenska Supercupen: 2011, 2012

Individual

- Swedish Defender of the Year: 2004
