= May Mahlangu =

South African soccer player

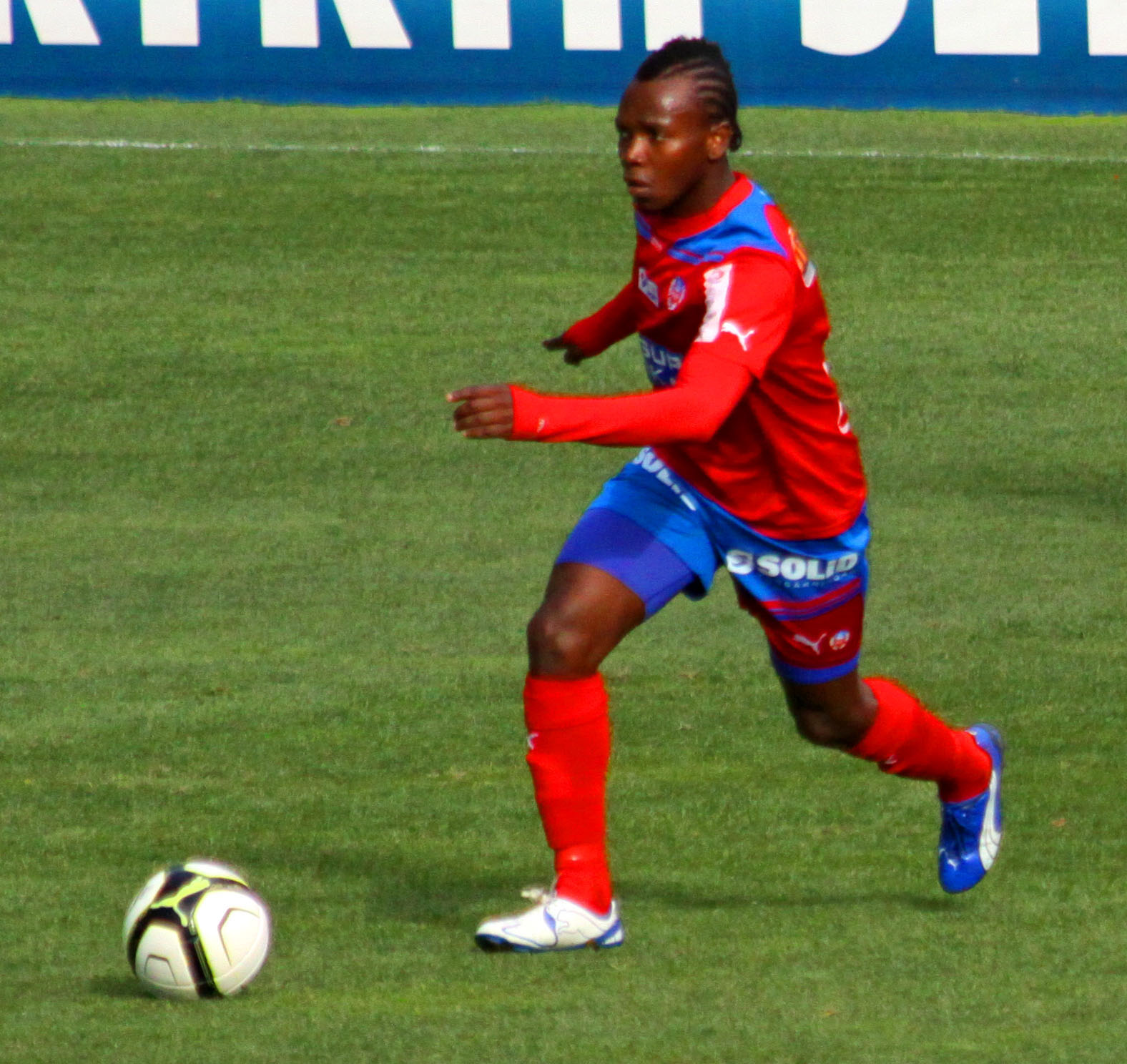
- Mahlangu playing for Helsingborgs IF in 2012

Personal information
- Full name: May Sphiwe Mahlangu
- Date of birth: 1 May 1989 (age 37)
- Place of birth: Secunda, South Africa
- Height: 1.73 m (5 ft 8 in)
- Position: Central midfielder

Youth career
- 2004–2006: Stars of Africa Academy

Senior career*
Years	Team	Apps	(Gls)
2006–2008	Alexandra United	40	(3)
2008–2013	Helsingborgs IF	98	(7)
2008–2009	→ IFK Hässleholm (loan)	16	(6)
2014	IFK Göteborg	24	(5)
2015	Konyaspor	10	(1)
2015–2016	Sint-Truiden	18	(2)
2016–2018	Dinamo București	62	(3)
2018–2019	Ludogorets Razgrad	4	(1)
2019	→ Ordabasy (loan)	29	(3)
2020–2021	Ordabasy	22	(0)
2022	Aksu	3	(0)
Total		326	(31)

International career
2012–2016	South Africa	18	(2)
- * Club domestic league appearances and goals

May Mahlangu (born 1 May 1989) is a South African professional soccer player who plays as a central midfielder.

== Club career ==
=== Early career ===
Mahlangu joined the Stars of Africa Academy at the age of 15 and played for their team, Alexandra United FC.

=== Helsingborgs IF ===
Bo Nilsson was the manager of Allsvenskan club Helsingborgs IF in 2008 and, through his connections with the academy, brought Mahlangu to Sweden. Nilsson arranged for Mahlangu to train with both Helsingborg and fourth-tier club IFK Hässleholm each day, and to initially play league matches for Hässleholm. After impressing in the Swedish lower leagues, Helsingborg decided to make him a permanent member of their squad in the summer of 2009. In 2011, the club won the Swedish league, and Mahlangu was awarded the player of the year award.

=== IFK Göteborg ===
On 4 March 2014, Mahlangu joined Allsvenskan club IFK Göteborg on a one-year contract.

=== Konyaspor ===
Mahlangu signed with Konyaspor in January 2015 as a free transfer. On 28 February 2015, he scored his first league goal against Fenerbahçe.

=== Ludogorets Razgrad ===
Mahlangu signed a contract with Ludogorets Razgrad in August 2018, but saw limited action for the team.

=== Ordabasy ===
In 2019, he joined Ordabasy on loan before signing permanently with the Kazakh side in 2020.

== International career ==
In January 2012, Mahlangu made his debut for the South Africa national team in a friendly against Equatorial Guinea. He was also included in South Africa's squad for the 2013 Africa Cup of Nations.

In November 2014, Mahlangu was banned from selection for Bafana Bafana after failing to report for their 2015 Africa Cup of Nations qualifiers against Sudan and Nigeria, citing fatigue.

== Career statistics ==
=== Club ===
As of 13 February 2019

Appearances and goals by club, season and competition
Club	Season	Division	League		Cup (Note: Includes Cupa României, Cupa Ligii, Supercupa României, Bulgarian Cup and Bulgarian Supercup.)		Continental (Note: Includes UEFA Champions League and UEFA Europa League.)		Total	
Club	Season	Division	Apps	Goals	Apps	Goals	Apps	Goals	Apps	Goals
IFK Hässleholm	2008	Division 2	6	1	—		—		6	1
IFK Hässleholm	2009	Division 2	10	5	0	0	—		10	5
IFK Hässleholm	Total		16	6	0	0	0	0	16	6
Helsingborgs IF	2009	Allsvenskan	8	0	1	0	1	0	10	0
Helsingborgs IF	2010	Allsvenskan	19	3	3	0	—		22	3
Helsingborgs IF	2011	Allsvenskan	28	4	6	1	4	0	38	5
Helsingborgs IF	2012	Allsvenskan	30	0	1	0	12	0	43	0
Helsingborgs IF	2013	Allsvenskan	13	0	5	0	—		18	0
Helsingborgs IF	Total		98	7	16	1	17	0	131	8
IFK Göteborg	2014	Allsvenskan	24	5	0	0	6	2	30	7
Konyaspor	2014–15	Süper Lig	10	1	2	0	—		12	1
Sint-Truiden	2015–16	Belgian Pro League	18	2	1	0	—		19	2
Dinamo București	2016–17	Liga I	22	0	5	1	—		27	1
Dinamo București	2017–18	Liga I	35	2	2	0	2	0	39	2
Dinamo București	2018–19	Liga I	5	1	0	0	—		5	1
Dinamo București	Total		62	3	7	1	2	0	71	4
Ludogorets Razgrad	2018–19	First League	4	1	1	0	2	0	7	1
Ludogorets Razgrad II	2018–19	Second League	3	0	—		—		3	0
Ordabasy (loan)	2019	Kazakhstan Premier League	29	3	2	0	4	0	35	3
Ordabasy	2020	Kazakhstan Premier League	0	0	0	0	0	0	0	0
Career total			264	28	29	2	31	2	324	33

=== International ===
As of 7 July 2019

Appearances and goals by national team and year
National team	Year	Apps	Goals
South Africa	2012	6	1
South Africa	2013	7	1
South Africa	2015	2	0
South Africa	2016	3	0
Total		18	2

Scores and results list South Africa's goal tally first; the score column indicates the score after each Mahlangu goal.

List of international goals scored by May Mahlangu
No.	Date	Venue	Opponent	Score	Result	Competition
1	22 December 2012	Moses Mabhida Stadium, Durban, South Africa	Malawi	3–1	3–1	Friendly
2	27 January 2013	Moses Mabhida Stadium, Durban, South Africa	Morocco	1–1	2–2	2013 Africa Cup of Nations

== Honours ==
Helsingborgs IF

- Allsvenskan: 2011
- Svenska Cupen: 2010, 2011
- Svenska Supercupen: 2011, 2012

Dinamo Bucharest

- Cupa Ligii: 2016–17

Individual

- Allsvenskan Player of the Year: 2011
