= George Moussan =

Swedish footballer

Personal information
- Full name: George Moussan
- Date of birth: 8 November 1989 (age 36)
- Place of birth: Sweden
- Height: 1.88 m (6 ft 2 in)
- Position: Goalkeeper

Youth career
- 1998–2005: Valsta Syrianska IK

Senior career*
| Years | Team | Apps | (Gls) |
| 2005 | Valsta Syrianska IK | | |
| 2006–2010 | Hammarby TFF | 38 | (0) |
| 2006–2011 | Hammarby IF | 5 | (0) |
| 2009 | → Carlstad United BK (loan) | 15 | (0) |
| 2011 | → Nyköpings BIS (loan) | 14 | (0) |
| 2012 | Hammarby IF | 0 | (0) |
| 2012–2013 | AFC United | 13 | (0) |
| 2013 | Valsta Syrianska IK | 5 | (0) |
| 2014–2017 | Arlanda FF | ? | (?) |

International career
| 2006 | Sweden U17 | 1 | (0) |
| 2007 | Sweden U19 | 1 | (0) |
- * Club domestic league appearances and goals

George Moussan (born 8 November 1989) is a Swedish former professional footballer who played as a goalkeeper. He has played one game each for Sweden U17 and Sweden U19 and he was also called up for the Syrian national team in March 2009 for the friendly match against Qatar, but he remained on the bench.
