= Ardian Gashi =

Kosovar footballer (born 1981)

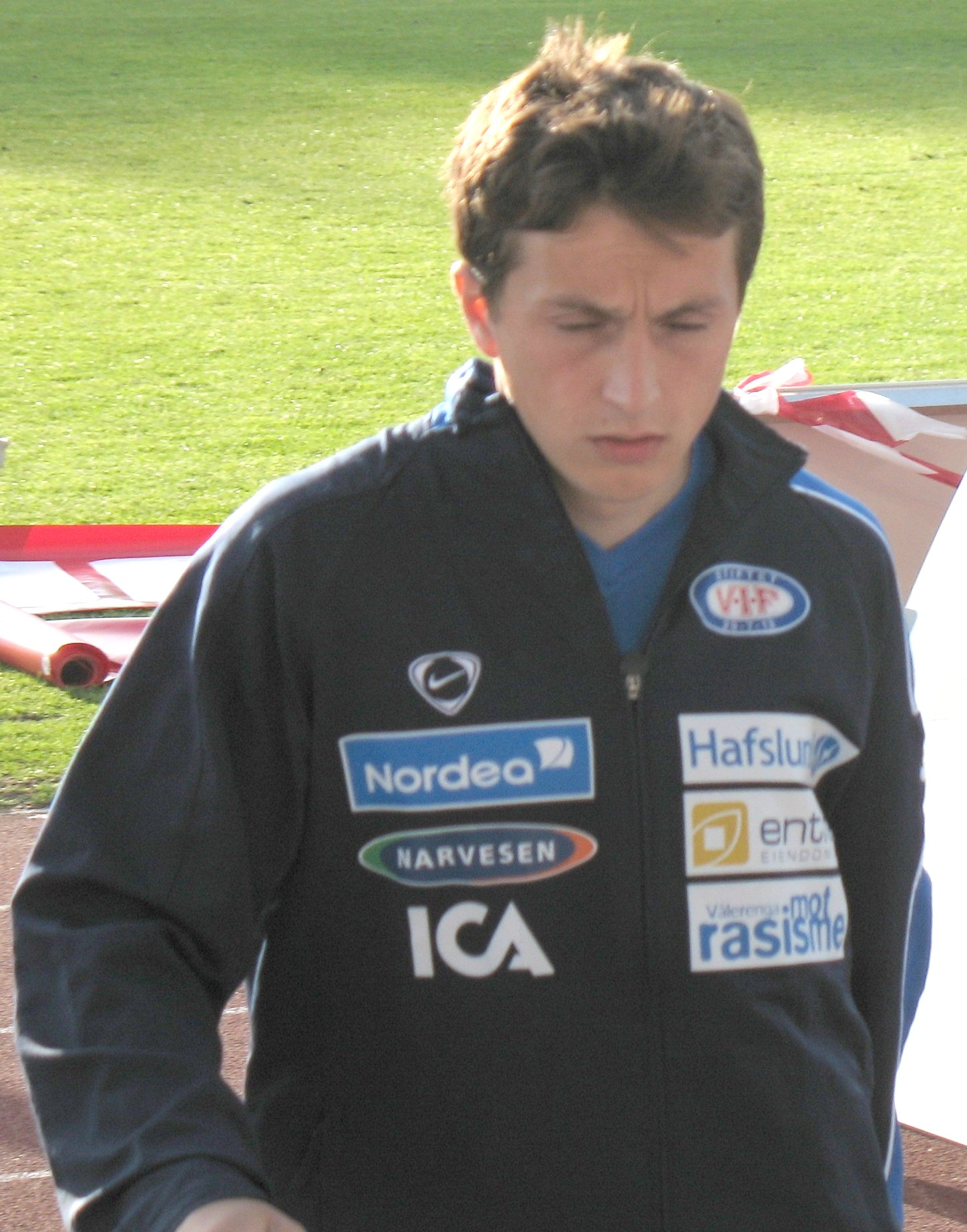
- Gashi with Vålerenga in 2006

Personal information
- Date of birth: 20 June 1981 (age 45)
- Place of birth: Đakovica, Kosovo, Serbia, SFR Yugoslavia (now Gjakova, Kosovo)
- Height: 1.72 m (5 ft 8 in)
- Position: Midfielder

Youth career
- KIL/Hemne

Senior career*
Years	Team	Apps	(Gls)
2001	Molde	4	(0)
2002–2003	Ørn-Horten	39	(9)
2003	Vålerenga (loan)	14	(1)
2004–2006	Vålerenga	62	(10)
2006–2007	Brann	18	(0)
2007–2009	Fredrikstad	64	(10)
2010–2014	Helsingborg	124	(8)
2014–2017	Odd	29	(0)
2017–2018	Ørn-Horten	13	(0)
Total		367	(38)

International career
2002–2003	Norway U21	18	(2)
2004–2013	Norway	14	(0)
2014	Kosovo	2	(0)
- * Club domestic league appearances and goals

Ardian Gashi (born 20 June 1981) is a Kosovar retired footballer who played as a midfielder. Gashi played for Molde, Vålerenga, Brann, Fredrikstad and Odd in the Norwegian top division, and Helsingborg in Allsvenskan.

Gashi is from Kosovo, but his family moved to Norway when he was eight years old. He became a Norwegian citizen, and has played for the Norway national team until 2014, when he started to play for Kosovo.

== Club career ==
Gashi was born in Gjakova, SFR Yugoslavia, but Gashi's family, who is of Albanian ethnicity, moved from Kosovo to Norway as refugees when he was eight years old. Gashi's family moved to Kyrksæterøra in Norway and he started to play football at the local club KIL/Hemne before he moved transferred to Molde in 1998. After a spell at Ørn Horten he went to Oslo to play for Vålerenga on loan in 2003, and later permanently.

Gashi was an important player in Vålerenga's good 2004 season, when the club finished as runners-up in the league.

In the 2005 season Gashi missed a number of games in August, due to having to serve a prison sentence for breaking the speed limits while driving. He was sentenced to 18 days in prison, but was released after 14, for good behavior, and thus managed to play in Vålerenga's 1–0 loss. He was later to play in the penalty shootout loss against Club Brugge in the last round of UEFA Champions League qualification.

On 30 August 2006, Gashi signed for Brann in a transfer worth about NOK 7.000.000. On 25 July 2007, he signed with Fredrikstad FK. It was announced in December 2009 that he would join Swedish club Helsingborgs IF for the 2010 season.

In Helsingborg, in the 2011 season he formed a successful central midfield partnership with May Mahlangu which was a key to Helsingborg winning both the cup and the league.

On 5 August 2014, he joined Odd, signing a contract until the summer of 2017.

== International career ==
Gashi played 18 matches for the Norway U21 national team between 2002 and 2003, scoring two goals. He was later capped seven times for the senior team between 2004 and 2005, his last cap was the 2006 World Cup qualifying match against Belarus on 12 October 2005. In October 2012, Gashi was again called up for the national team squad, following Håvard Nordtveit's suspension ahead of the 2014 World Cup qualifying match against Cyprus Gashi started the match on the bench, but came on as a substitute for Magnus Wolff Eikrem after 89 minutes.

Even though Gashi has been capped for Norway, he has stated several times that his biggest dream is to represent Kosovo as a footballer. He has stated that, although he is ethnically Albanian, he would like to score against Albania in the qualifiers for the FIFA World Cup 2014, if he would be selected for the upcoming 2013 matches and would not follow the example of Granit Xhaka, another ethnic Albanian, playing for Switzerland, who graced Albania in their match against the Swiss.

Ahead of the friendly match against South Africa in January 2013, Gashi persuaded Egil "Drillo" Olsen to play with him as the holding midfielder, and Drillo praised Gashi's performance after the match.

Gashi switched to the Kosovar FA, and made an appearance for them in their first ever game against Haiti national football team in a 1–1 tie.

== Career statistics ==
As of 25 August 2018

Appearances and goals by club, season and competition
Season	Club	Division	League		Cup		Total	
Season	Club	Division	Apps	Goals	Apps	Goals	Apps	Goals
Molde	2001	Tippeligaen	4	0	2	1	6	1
Ørn-Horten	2002	Adeccoligaen	26	8	2	1	28	9
Ørn-Horten	2003	Adeccoligaen	13	1	2	0	15	1
Ørn-Horten	Total		39	9	4	1	43	10
Vålerenga	2003	Tippeligaen	14	1	2	0	16	1
Vålerenga	2004	Tippeligaen	25	4	3	1	28	5
Vålerenga	2005	Tippeligaen	22	6	4	2	26	8
Vålerenga	2006	Tippeligaen	15	0	3	2	18	2
Vålerenga	Total		76	11	12	5	88	16
Brann	2006	Tippeligaen	7	0	0	0	7	0
Brann	2007	Tippeligaen	11	0	3	0	14	0
Brann	Total		18	0	3	0	21	0
Fredrikstad	2007	Tippeligaen	11	5	0	0	11	5
Fredrikstad	2008	Tippeligaen	25	3	3	1	28	4
Fredrikstad	2009	Tippeligaen	28	2	4	1	32	3
Fredrikstad	Total		64	10	7	2	71	12
Helsingborg	2010	Allsvenskan	27	5	4	0	31	5
Helsingborg	2011	Allsvenskan	30	1	4	0	34	1
Helsingborg	2012	Allsvenskan	27	0	1	0	28	0
Helsingborg	2013	Allsvenskan	27	2	0	0	27	2
Helsingborg	2014	Allsvenskan	13	0	0	0	13	0
Helsingborg	Total		124	8	9	0	133	8
Odd	2014	Tippeligaen	11	0	3	0	14	0
Odd	2015	Tippeligaen	16	0	3	1	19	1
Odd	2016	Tippeligaen	2	0	1	0	3	0
Odd	2017	Eliteserien	0	0	0	0	0	0
Odd	Total		29	0	7	1	36	1
Ørn-Horten	2017	3. divisjon	3	0	0	0	3	0
Ørn-Horten	2018	3. divisjon	10	0	0	0	10	0
Ørn-Horten	Total		13	0	0	0	13	0
Career total			367	38	44	10	411	48

== Honours ==
Vålerenga

- Tippeligaen: 2005

Brann

- Tippeligaen: 2007

Helsingborg

- Allsvenskan: 2011
- Svenska Cupen: 2010, 2011
- Supercupen: 2011, 2012

Individual

- Kniksen award: midfielder of the year in 2004
