= Sebastian Castro-Tello =

Swedish footballer (born 1987)

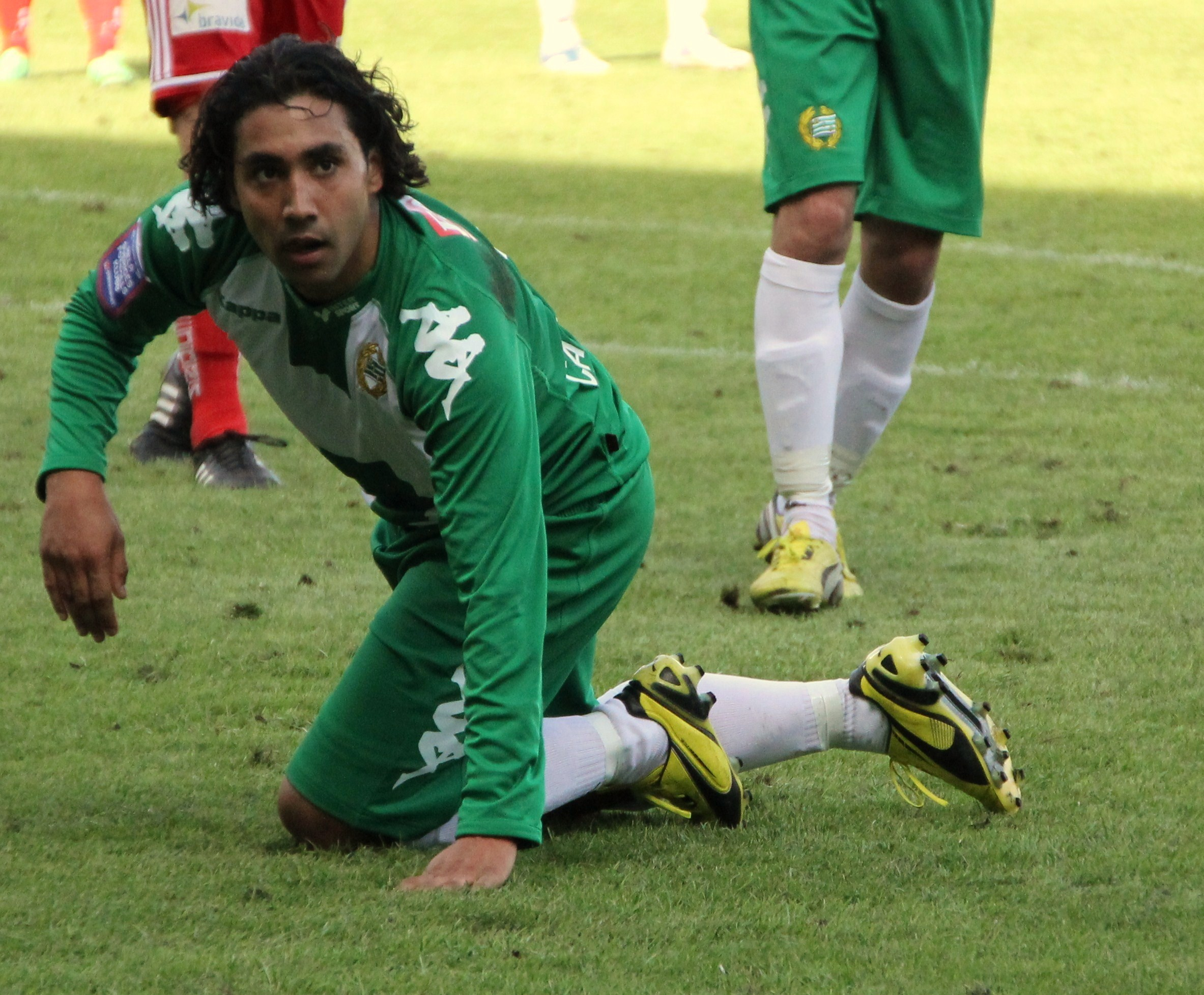
- Castro-Tello playing for Hammarby IF in 2013

Personal information
- Date of birth: 14 March 1987 (age 39)
- Place of birth: Stockholm, Sweden
- Height: 1.80 m (5 ft 11 in)
- Positions: Midfielder; striker

Youth career
- 1995: Norsborgs IF
- 1995–1997: Essinge IK
- 1998–2002: Hammarby IF

Senior career*
Years	Team	Apps	(Gls)
1998–2006	Hammarby TFF	31	(3)
2006–2013	Hammarby IF	139	(19)
2013	→ Ravan Baku (loan)	9	(2)
2014	Degerfors IF	27	(7)
2015	Nacka FF		
2016	Arameiska-Syrianska IF		

International career
2006	Sweden U19	3	(0)
2007	Sweden U21	11	(3)
- * Club domestic league appearances and goals as of 14 February 2017

Sebastian Castro-Tello (born 14 March 1987) is a Swedish former professional football player of Chilean descent.

== Career ==
=== Hammarby ===
He started his senior career at Hammarby Talang FF before signing his first professional contract, a four-year deal, with their parent club Hammarby IF in 2006. Castro-Tello made four appearances for the side in Allsvenskan during the same season.

In 2007, he put on impressive performances whilst playing 16 games and scoring 4 goals. In the off season, Castro-Tello was nominated to win the award as the newcomer of the year on the Swedish Fotbollsgalan. However, the price later went to Gefle IF's striker Johan Oremo.

He played another two full seasons in Allsvenskan as a starter for Hammarby, before the club got relegated to Superettan, the Swedish second tier, in 2009. During the same year Castro-Tello sparked some controversy as he allegedly featured in a non-professional game for another club, managed by some of his childhood friends. The claims from the opposing team where however never proven.

In 2010, he enjoyed a fruitful partnership with the striker Linus Hallenius in Superettan, scoring 8 goals for the club. He scored another 4 goals for the club in a successful run in Svenska Cupen, where Hammarby lost out on the gold medal after a loss in the final against Helsingborgs IF.

During the following seasons his performances declined. In late 2012, Hammarby unsuccessfully searched to terminate his contract following a series of reported misbehaviour.

=== Ravan Baku ===
In July 2013, Castro-Tello joined the Azerbaijan Premier League club Ravan Baku on a year long loan. On 10 August 2013, Castro-Tello made his debut for Ravan Baku at home in their 0–2 defeat against Neftchi Baku. Castro-Tello's first goal for Ravan came on 25 August 2013, in the club's 1–5 home defeat against Inter Baku.

In early October Castro-Tello returned to Sweden, whilst still under contract, after a dispute with Ravan over terms in his contract, which he felt where broken by the club. Castro-Tello's loan contract was cancelled in December.

=== Degerfors IF ===
Before the 2014 season, he signed a two-year deal with Degerfors IF in Superettan. He enjoyed a successful campaign at his new side, scoring 7 goals in 27 competitive games. However, Castro-Tello terminated his contract with the club by mutual consent in early 2015, citing homesickness as the main reason.

=== Decline and professional retirement ===
He then returned to his home town Stockholm, where he represented various teams in the lower leagues during 2015 and 2016, thus effectively ending his professional career.

== Position ==
Castro-Tello played as a striker during some games in 2008, but his standard position was attacking midfielder.

== International career ==
He made his debut for the Sweden national under-21 football team on 5 June 2007 against Switzerland national under-21 football team. In total, he won 11 caps and scored 3 goals for the U21s.

== Professional career statistics ==
As of February 2015

Club performance			League		Cup		Continental		Total	
Season	Club	League	Apps	Goals	Apps	Goals	Apps	Goals	Apps	Goals
Sweden			League		Svenska Cupen		Europe		Total	
2006	Hammarby	Allsvenskan	4	0			—		4	0
2007	Hammarby	Allsvenskan	16	4			4	1	20	5
2008	Hammarby	Allsvenskan	21	0			—		21	0
2009	Hammarby	Allsvenskan	25	1	2	0	—		27	1
2010	Hammarby	Superettan	26	8	5	4	—		31	12
2011	Hammarby	Superettan	22	2	1	0	—		23	2
2012	Hammarby	Superettan	16	3	0	0	—		16	3
2013	Hammarby	Superettan	9	1	0	0	—		9	1
Azerbaijan			League		Azerbaijan Cup		Europe		Total	
2013–14	Ravan Baku	APL	9	2	0	0	—		9	2
Total	Sweden		134	19			4	1	138	20
Total	Azerbaijan		9	2	0	0	-		9	2
Career total			143	21			4	1	147	22
