= Tobias Mattsson =

Swedish footballer

Personal information
- Full name: Tobias Mattsson
- Date of birth: 9 March 1991 (age 35)
- Place of birth: Sweden
- Height: 1.89 m (6 ft 2 in)
- Position: Defender

Team information
- Current team: Trelleborgs FF
- Number: 2

Senior career*
Years	Team	Apps	(Gls)
2010–	Trelleborgs FF	30	(0)
- * Club domestic league appearances and goals as of 25 November 2013

Tobias Mattsson (born 9 March 1991) is a Swedish footballer who plays for Trelleborgs FF as a forward.
