= Marcus Nilsson (footballer) =

Swedish footballer and manager

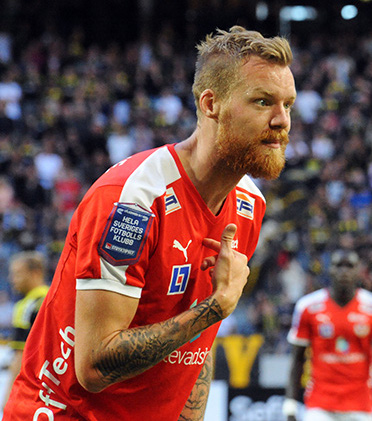

Personal information
- Full name: Marcus Åke Jens-Erik Nilsson
- Date of birth: 26 February 1988 (age 38)
- Place of birth: Rydebäck, Sweden
- Height: 1.93 m (6 ft 4 in)
- Position: Centre-back

Youth career
- 1994–2002: Rydebäcks IF
- 2003–2006: Helsingborg

Senior career*
Years	Team	Apps	(Gls)
2007–2011	Helsingborg	83	(2)
2011–2014	Utrecht	16	(0)
2014	→ Kalmar (loan)	14	(0)
2014–2015	Kalmar	34	(1)
2016	Fleetwood Town	13	(1)
2016	Stabæk	13	(0)
2017	Pohang Steelers	0	(0)
2018–2021	Eskilsminne IF	22	(0)

International career
2005	Sweden U17	2	(0)
2005–2007	Sweden U19	17	(2)
2009–2010	Sweden U21	13	(1)
2011	Sweden	1	(0)

Managerial career
- 2018–2019: Eskilsminne IF (assistant coach)
- * Club domestic league appearances and goals

Marcus Åke Jens-Erik Nilsson (born 26 February 1988) is a Swedish football manager and former player who played as a centre-back and since 2018, he has joined Eskilsminne IF.

== Club career ==
=== Helsingborg ===
Born in Rydebäck, Sweden, Nilsson played for his hometown club, Rydebäcks IF, before joining Helsingborg in 2003 when he was thirteen years old. After progressing through the ranks at Helsingborg, Nilsson was called up to the first team for the 2007 season and was involved in the first team pre-season matches. Nilson appeared as an unused substitute in the Svenska Supercupen, as the club lost 1–0 against Elfsborg on 31 March 2007. Manager Stuart Baxter gave Nilsson his debut on 1 May 2007, starting and playing 70 minutes before being substituted, in a 1–0 loss against IF Elfsborg, With two appearances in the 2007 season, Nilsson signed a contract with the club in September 2007.

The 2008 season saw Nilsson struggling to make a breakthrough in the first team, with the likes of Joel Ekstrand, Andreas Granqvist and Samir Beloufa established himself in the central defence position. Following the departure of Granqvist and the arrival of Hannu Patronen, he made his first appearance of the season, starting the whole game, in a 1–1 draw against Göteborg on 8 July 2008. From July to October, Nilsson had a handful of first team appearances and formed a central defence partnership with youngsters, Ekstrand. However by October, he lost his first team place and was demoted to the substitute bench for the rest of the season. At the end of the 2008 season, Nilsson went on to make eleven appearances in all competitions.

At the start of the 2009 season, Nilsson helped Helsingborgs IF side go to their winning form in the first three league matches to the season. He then helped the club keep three clean sheets in the three matches between 29 April 2009 and 11 May 2009 against AIK, Malmö and IF Brommapojkarna. Since the start of the 2009 season, Nilsson continued to establish himself in the first team, forming a centre–back partnership with Ekstrand. Both performance resulted him and Ekstrand signing a contract extension, keeping him until 2012. Since the start of the 2009 season, Nilsson was an ever starting player in the first team this season until he was absent on two separate occasions throughout July. In a match against FK Sarajevo in the second leg of the UEFA Europa League third round, Nilssson played 120 minutes, resulting in a penalty shootout with the opposition team winning 2–1 and successfully converted the penalty, which saw Helsingborgs IF eliminated from the tournament. Following his return from suspension, he regained his first team place in the centre–back position. This last until Nilsson was suspended that kept him out for the rest of the season. At the end of the 2009 season, he went on to make thirty–four appearances in all competitions.

At the start of the 2010 season, Nilsson was in defensive first team position when he helped Helsingborgs IF keep four clean sheets in the first four league matches. During which, Nilsson scored his first goal of the season, in a 2–0 win against Djurgården on 29 March 2010. Three weeks later on 20 April 2010, he scored his second goal of the season, in a 2–1 win against Malmö. This was followed up by helping the club keep three clean sheets in the next three matches between 26 April 2010 and 3 May 2010. Since the start of the 2010 season, Nilsson started in every match, which saw Helsingborgs IF went on a twelve match unbeaten until he received a red card after a second bookable, in a 3–1 win over Gefle on 10 May 2010 After serving a one match suspension, Nilsson returned to the starting line–up against Halmstad on 22 May 2010, starting the whole game, in a 2–1 win. However, his return was short–lived when he was suspended for a match against BK Häcken on 26 July 2010 for picking up five yellow cards this season. Despite being suspended twice during the 2010 season, Nilsson continued to regain his first team place for Helsingborgs IF, forming a centre–back partnership with Ekstrand and helping the club to keep their league title chance alive. However, in the last game of the season against Kalmar, he started the whole game and helped Helsingborgs IF keep a clean sheet, in a 0–0 draw but cost the club to win the league title, as title contender rival, Malmö FF, won the league following their win. In a follow–up match, Nilsson started in the Svenska Cupen Final against Hammarby and helped Helsingborgs win the tournament by beating the opposition team 1–0 on 13 November 2010. At the end of the 2010 season, he went on to make thirty-three appearances and scoring two times in all competitions.

In the 2011 season, Nilsson started the season well when he scored the opener in a 2–1 win over Malmö to help Helsingborgs IF win the Svenska Supercupen. Nilsson once again became a first team regular in the centre–back position, forming a partnership with Peter Larsson and Markus Holgersson. He started the season with a good start by helping the club win the first four league matches, including three clean sheets against Mjällby, Elfsborg and Syrianska. Since the start of the 2011 season, Nilsson started in every match until he was suspended for two matches for picking up three yellow cards so far this season. After serving a two match suspension, Nilsson scored on his return from suspension in the last-16 of the Svenska Cupen, in a 2–1 win over Trelleborgs FF. His performance attracted interests from clubs around Europe, including Danish side Copenhagen, who were interested in signing him and at one point, involved Peter Larsson as part of the exchange. It came after when Helsingborgs IF began open talks with the player over a new contract. Amid the transfer speculation, the club's supporters reacted positively towards Nilsson's transfer and welcomed his return in the near future when he played against Djurgårdens on 11 July 2011. His last appearance for the club in a wake of his transfer move came on 18 July 2011 against Kalmar, in a 2–1 win, which Nilsson was in tears as a result.

=== Utrecht ===
Eventually, Nilsson opted to move abroad when he signed for Eredivisie side Utrecht, signing a four-year contract on 12 July 2011. The transfer fee was reportedly between 10 and 15 million Krone.

Nilsson made his Utrecht debut in the opening game of the season, where he made his first start and played a whole game, in a 0–0 draw against VVV-Venlo, keeping a clean sheet. However, in a 2–1 loss against Vitesse on 20 August 2011, Nilsson received a straight red card in the 86th minute. After serving a two match suspension, he returned to the starting line–up, in a 2–2 draw against Heracles Almelo on 18 September 2011. Once again, Nilsson was sent-off for the second time this season on 15 October 2011, in a 1–0 loss against PSV Eindhoven. In a match against Feyenoord on 11 December 2011, Nilsson suffered a knee injury during the match and was substituted early in the match. He had successful surgery in February 2012 but was out of action for the rest of the season. Despite making 16 appearances in all competitions, Nilsson was named as the league's worst signing of the season by Voetbal International.

The 2012–13 season saw Nilsson recovered from a knee injury in the pre-season and made his first appearance of the season on 18 August 2012, making his first start and played 90 minutes, in a 3–1 win over VVV-Venlo. He then made two more appearances for the club in the first team before being demoted to the substitute bench. As a result, Nilsson began playing in the club's reserve team in a number of matches. However, he continuously faced his own injury concerns on three separate occasions that sidelined him for the rest of the 2012–13 season. At the end of the 2012–13 season, Nilsson went on to make three appearances in all competitions. Following this, he spent the rest of the year, continuing to rehabilitate his back injury.

=== Kalmar FF ===
On 31 January 2014, Nilsson returned to Sweden where he joined Kalmar on loan until 31 July 2014. The move was later confirmed the next day. Nilsson acknowledged his move to Kalmar, where he cited first team opportunities as a factor to the move.

Nilsson made his Kalmar FF debut, in the opening game of the season, starting the whole game, in a 2–1 win over IF Brommapojkarna. This was followed up in the next match against Åtvidaberg when Nilsson set up one of the goal for Måns Söderqvist, who went to score twice, in a 2–2 draw. He then helped the club keep four clean sheets in four matches between 28 April 2014 and 10 May 2014. Since joining the club, Nilsson established himself in the first team, playing in the centre–back position. His performance led Kalmar signing the player on a permanent basis, keeping him until the end of the season. He then scored his first goal for the club, as well as, setting up the opening goal of the game, in a 2–0 win over Mjällby on 27 October 2014. Despite being sidelined with suspensions and injuries, Nilsson finished his first season at the club, making twenty-six appearances and scoring once in all competitions.

Ahead of the 2015 season, Nilsson signed a contract extension with Kalmar FF, ending the transfer rumours that he could leave the club. Since the start of the 2015 season, Nilsson continued to establish himself in the first team, playing in the centre–back position. In a match against his former club Helsingborgs IF on 31 July 2015, Nilsson was involved in an incident with the opposition's supporters, resulting an apology from the player. Despite suffering setbacks of suspension and injuries throughout the 2015 season, he finished the season, making twenty-three appearances in all competitions. Following this, Nilsson later revealed to the Kalmar's management that he would be leaving the club, just before Christmas.

=== Fleetwood Town ===
On 3 February 2016, Nilsson signed for Fleetwood Town on a deal until the end of the 2015–16 season.

He made his Fleetwood Town debut four days later after signing for the club on 7 February 2016, where he came on as a substitute in the second half, in a 0–0 draw against Shrewsbury Town. Since making his debut, Nilsson became a first team regular at the club, playing in the centre–back position for the next eleven matches. On 5 March 2016, he scored his first Fleetwood Town goal, in a 2–2 draw against Sheffield United. However, he later lost his first team place and was demoted to the substitute bench for the rest of the 2015–16 season. At the end of the 2015–16 season, Nilsson went on to make thirteen appearances and scoring once in all competitions. Following this, the club opted to take up their option of a contract extension, keeping Nilsson under contract until summer 2017.

However, less than a month later, Nilsson was expected to leave the club, having fallen out of favour under the management of Steven Pressley, leading Scandinavian clubs keen on signing him.

=== Stabæk ===
On 20 July 2016, Nilsson joined Norwegian Tippeligaen side Stabæk. The move was reported to be an undisclosed fee by the club's website.

Nilsson then made his Stabæk debut on 24 July 2016, where he made his first start and played the whole game, in a 2–2 draw against Tromsø. Since making his debut for the club, he established himself in the first team at Stabæk for the rest of the 2016 season. The club narrowly escaped relegation after beating Jerv 2–1 on aggregate in the league's relegation play–offs and Stabæk retained their place in the 2017 Eliteserien. Despite being sidelined with injuries, Nilsson went on to make thirteen appearances for the club. At the end of the 2016 season, he left the club on 1 January 2017.

=== Pohang Steelers ===
Only weeks after leaving Stabæk, Nilsson joined K League Classic side Pohang Steelers on 25 January 2017, with the contract length were not disclosed. However, he made no appearances for the club, due to injuries and on 2 June 2017, Nilsson's contract was officially terminated by mutual consent. Following his release from the club, he returned to Sweden and said in an interview with Expressen on whether to continue his football career or not, saying: "I expect to rehabilitate in January, then I will be able to be healthy. I have received that information from the doctors. I have had contact with them since I came home. They ask me how the process is going, it's more that we keep in touch that way. I have not closed any doors at all, it depends on when I can get well and what alternatives I get. No club wants to recruit an injured player."

=== Eskilsminne IF ===
In March 2018, Nilsson was appointed as Eskilsminne IF's assistant coach. Upon becoming the club's assistant coach, he said: "No, it is included in the planning. I want to give my career another chance if my injury heals and I can get back to an earlier level. I am in the process now and naturally hope that it will move forward. When sports director Kalle Olsson came up with the proposal that we would make a solution where, in addition to being a potential player, I would also take the assistant job, I decided to say yes."

However, Nilsson's time as Eskilsminne IF's assistant manager lasted for one season when he was no longer assigned for the role but was registered as a player ahead of the 2019 season. Nilsson previously appeared twice as an unused substitute in the 2018 season. Nilsson then made two appearances for the 2019 season, though he appeared as an unused substitute at times.

Nilsson made his first appearance of the 2020 season, starting a match and played 76 minutes before being substituted, in a 4–1 loss against GAIS in the Svenska Cupen on 8 March 2020. The 2020 season was pushed back, due to the pandemic, allowing the player to heal from his injury that he sustained prior to this. Once the league resumed behind closed doors, Nilsson appeared once for the rest of the 2020 season.

== International career ==
=== Sweden Youth ===
Having represented Sweden U16, Nilsson was called up to the Sweden U17 for the first time in June 2005. He made his U17 national team debut, starting the whole game, in a 1–0 loss against Norway U17 on 19 July 2005. Nilsson went on to make five appearances for Sweden U17, including scoring his first goal against Croatia U17 on 24 Augiust 2005.

In December 2005, Nilsson was called up to the Sweden U18 squad for the first time. He had to wait until on 8 June 2006 to make his debut for the U18 national team against United States U18. By the end of the year, Nilsson went on to make five more appearances by the end of the year.

In October 2006, Nilsson was called up to the Sweden U19 squad for the first time. He made his debut for the U19 national team, starting the whole game, in a 4–1 win against Faroe Islands U19 on 6 October 2006. Two days later on 8 October 2006, Nilsson scored his first goal for Sweden U19, in a 2–0 win against Iceland U18. He then appeared the U19 national team in a number of matches for the following year.

In March 2009, Nilsson was called up by Sweden U21 for the first time. He made his U21 national team debut on 31 March 2009, starting the whole game, in a 2–1 win over Belgium U21, having previously been on the bench in the previous game. Nilsson scored his first goal on 12 August 2009, he scored his first goal for Sweden U21, in a 4–2 win over Denmark U21. Nilsson went on to make six appearances for the U21 national team by the end of the year. He continued to feature for Sweden U21, making six more appearances the following year.

=== Sweden ===
In December 2010, Nilsson was called up by Sweden for the first time. The following month, on 22 January 2011, he made his (and only appearance) debut for the national side, coming in a 1–1 draw with South Africa.

== Personal life ==
Nilsson is in a relationship with his girlfriend, Elin. In addition to speaking his native language, Swedish, he speaks Dutch and English.

== Career statistics ==
As of 18 April 2023

Appearances and goals by club, season and competition
Club	Season	League			Cup		Continental		Total	
Club	Season	Division	Apps	Goals	Apps	Goals	Apps	Goals	Apps	Goals
Helsingborg	2007	Allsvenskan	2	0	—		—		2	0
Helsingborg	2008	Allsvenskan	12	0	—		—		12	0
Helsingborg	2009	Allsvenskan	25	0	3	0	6 (Note: Appearance in UEFA Europa League)	0	28	0
Helsingborg	2010	Allsvenskan	28	2	5	0	—		33	2
Helsingborg	2011	Allsvenskan	16	0	2	1	—		18	1
Helsingborg	Total		83	2	10	1	0	0	93	3
Utrecht	2011–12	Eredivisie	13	0	1	0	—		14	0
Utrecht	2012–13	Eredivisie	3	0	0	0	—		3	0
Utrecht	2013–14	Eredivisie	0	0	0	0	—		0	0
Utrecht	Total		16	0	1	0	0	0	17	0
Kalmar	2014 (loan)	Allsvenskan	25	1	1	0	—		26	1
Kalmar	2015	Allsvenskan	23	0	0	0	—		23	0
Kalmar	Total		48	1	1	0	0	0	49	1
Fleetwood Town	2015–16	League One	13	1	0	0	—		13	1
Fleetwood Town	Total		13	1	0	0	0	0	13	1
Pohang Steelers	2017	K League 1	1	0	0	0	—		1	0
Pohang Steelers	Total		1	0	0	0	0	0	1	0
Eskilsminne	2018	Ettan	0	0	0	0	—		0	0
Eskilsminne	2019	Ettan	2	0	1	0	—		3	0
Eskilsminne	2020	Ettan	6	0	1	0	—		7	0
Eskilsminne	2021	Ettan	0	0	1	0	—		1	0
Eskilsminne	Total		8	0	3	0	0	0	11	0
Career total			169	4	15	1	6	0	190	5
