= José Monteiro (footballer) =

Guinea-Bissauan footballer (born 1982)

Personal information
- Full name: José Monteiro de Macedo
- Date of birth: 2 June 1982 (age 44)
- Place of birth: Algiers, Algeria
- Height: 1.84 m (6 ft 0 in)
- Position: Defender

Youth career
- 1997–1999: FoC Farsta
- 1999–2003: Hammarby IF

Senior career*
Years	Team	Apps	(Gls)
2003–2006	Hammarby Talang FF	63	(0)
2006–2012	Hammarby IF	138	(1)
2013–2014	FC Andrea Doria	20	(1)
2014	Värmdö IF	16	(1)
2015–2017	FC Stockholm Internazionale	43	(13)

International career
2010–2012	Guinea-Bissau	7	(0)

Managerial career
- 2014: Värmdö IF (asst. manager)
- * Club domestic league appearances and goals

José Monteiro de Macedo (born 2 June 1982) is a Guinea-Bissauan footballer who plays as a central defender.

== Personal life ==
Monteiro has acquired Swedish citizenship. He is the uncle of Portuguese international footballer Eder.
