= Stefan Ålander =

Swedish footballer

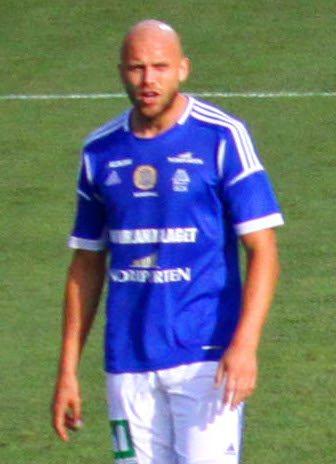

Personal information
- Full name: Lars Stefan Ålander
- Date of birth: 25 April 1983 (age 43)
- Place of birth: Sundsvall, Sweden
- Height: 1.85 m (6 ft 1 in)
- Position: Defender

Youth career
- IFK Timrå

Senior career*
Years	Team	Apps	(Gls)
1998–2000	IFK Timrå	34	(3)
2001–2009	GIF Sundsvall	178	(6)
2009–2010	Kalmar FF	31	(1)
2011–2016	GIF Sundsvall	102	(3)

International career
2000	Sweden U17	5	(0)
2002–2005	Sweden U21	16	(1)
- * Club domestic league appearances and goals as of 31 December 2016

Stefan Ålander (born 25 April 1983) is a Swedish retired footballer who lastly played for GIF Sundsvall as a defender.
