= Svenska Supercupen =

Swedish football tournament

- Founded: 2007
- Abolished: 2015
- Teams: 2
- Most championships: Helsingborgs IF; Malmö FF (2 titles)
- Website: Svenska Supercupen

Svenska Supercupen, Swedish Super Cup, was a one-off fixture in Swedish football played between the Allsvenskan champions and the winners of Svenska Cupen. The fixture was played in November, after the Allsvenskan season.

In the event of a club winning the double (as AIK did in 2009 and Helsingborg in 2011) the runner up of the Allsvenskan would take part. In 2011, Helsingborgs IF became the first team to have won Svenska Supercupen and not being the defending Allsvenskan champions. The winner of Svenska Supercupen received a prize money of 250,000 SEK.

The 2015 match, which became the last edition, was played on 8 November at Nya Parken, Norrköping where league winners IFK Norrköping competed against cup winners IFK Göteborg. IFK Norrköping won the match 3–0.

== History ==
Founded in 2007, the first six editions were played in March, before the start of the season. However, because Svenska Cupen changed into an autumn-spring format in 2012, Svenska Supercupen was moved to November to avoid collision with the Svenska Cupen group stage in March. Because of this, the 2012 Allsvenskan champions, IF Elfsborg never got the chance to compete even though the Swedish Football Association had plans of letting IF Elfsborg face the 2012 Allsvenskan runners-up BK Häcken in the spring of 2013.

The combination of cold weather and high ticket prices has had a negative effect on attendance. Even though the match is played at the home stadium of the Allsvenskan champion, attendance has hovered around 2,000 although 10,362 attended the 2011 edition which was more than the cumulative attendance until that year. It remains to be seen if this was a result of the fixture being a Skåne derby or an increase in interest in the fixture. Svenska Cupen has experienced similar problems with attendance.

== List of winners ==
Key
	Winners also won the Swedish championship during the same season
	Winners also won Svenska Cupen during the same season
	Winners won both the Swedish championship and Svenska Cupen during the same season
(aet)	After extra time
(pen.)	Penalty shoot-out
(number of cup wins)	A running tally of the total number of cup titles won by each club is kept in brackets.

Season	Winner	Result	Runners-up	Venue	Attendance	Winning team qualified as winner of
2007	IF Elfsborg (1)	1–0	Helsingborgs IF	Borås Arena	1,240	2006 Allsvenskan Champion
2008	IFK Göteborg (1)	3–1	Kalmar FF	Ullevi	1,643	2007 Allsvenskan Champion
2009	Kalmar FF (1)	1–0	IFK Göteborg	Fredriksskans	2,305	2008 Allsvenskan Champion
2010	AIK (1)	1–0	IFK Göteborg	Råsunda	2,537	2009 Allsvenskan Champion & 2009 Svenska Cupen Champion
2011	Helsingborgs IF (1)	2–1	Malmö FF	Swedbank Stadion	10,362	2010 Svenska Cupen Champion
2012	Helsingborgs IF (2)	2–0	AIK	Olympia	5,590	2011 Allsvenskan Champion & 2011 Svenska Cupen Champion
2013	Malmö FF (1)	3–2	IFK Göteborg	Swedbank Stadion	2,787	2013 Allsvenskan Champion
2014	Malmö FF (2)	2–2 (aet); 5–4 (pen.)	IF Elfsborg	Malmö Stadion	1,266	2014 Allsvenskan Champion
2015	IFK Norrköping (1)	3–0	IFK Göteborg	Nya Parken	2,662	2015 Allsvenskan Champion

== Performances ==
=== Performance by club ===
Club	Winners	Runners-up	Cup-winning years	Years as runners-up
Helsingborgs IF	2	1	2011, 2012	2007
Malmö FF	2	1	2013, 2014	2011
IFK Göteborg	1	4	2008	2009, 2010, 2013, 2015
Kalmar FF	1	1	2009	2008
AIK	1	1	2010	2012
IF Elfsborg	1	1	2007	2014
IFK Norrköping	1	–	2015	–

=== Total cup wins by city ===
City	Won	Clubs
Helsingborg	2	Helsingborgs IF (2)
Malmö	2	Malmö FF (2)
Borås	1	IF Elfsborg (1)
Gothenburg	1	IFK Göteborg (1)
Kalmar	1	Kalmar FF (1)
Norrköping	1	IFK Norrköping (1)
Stockholm	1	AIK (1)

=== Total cup wins by county ===
County	Won	Clubs
Skåne	4	Helsingborgs IF (2), Malmö FF (2)
Västra Götaland	2	IFK Göteborg (1), IF Elfsborg (1)
Kalmar	1	Kalmar FF (1)
Stockholm	1	AIK (1)
Östergötland	1	IFK Norrköping (1)

== See also ==
- Allsvenskan
- Svenska Cupen
- Svenska Supercupen (women)
