= Fadi Malke =

Swedish footballer

Personal information
- Full name: Fadi Malke
- Date of birth: 13 January 1986 (age 40)
- Place of birth: Sweden
- Height: 1.83 m (6 ft 0 in)
- Position: Defender

Youth career
- IF Brommapojkarna

Senior career*
Years	Team	Apps	(Gls)
2004–2006	IF Brommapojkarna	0	(0)
2006	→ Topkapi IK (loan)		
2006–2010	Hammarby TFF	52	(27)
2007–2012	Hammarby IF	34	(1)
2013	AFC United	19	(2)

International career
2003	Sweden U17	1	(0)
- * Club domestic league appearances and goals as of 11 August 2014

Fadi Malke (born 13 January 1986) is a Swedish footballer who plays as a defender and is a free agent after leaving his most recent club AFC United. He played in the Allsvenskan for Hammarby IF.
