= Alexander Gerndt =

Swedish footballer

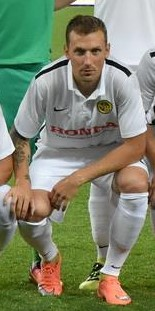
- Alexander Gerndt in August 2016

Personal information
- Full name: Alexander Clas Robin Gerndt
- Date of birth: 14 July 1986 (age 40)
- Place of birth: Visby, Sweden
- Height: 1.85 m (6 ft 1 in)
- Positions: Striker; right winger

Youth career
- Visby IF Gute

Senior career*
Years	Team	Apps	(Gls)
2004–2006	Visby IF Gute	39	(15)
2007–2008	AIK	5	(0)
2008	→ IK Sirius (loan)	14	(6)
2008–2010	Gefle	47	(11)
2010–2011	Helsingborg	31	(19)
2011–2013	Utrecht	41	(13)
2013–2017	Young Boys	90	(24)
2017–2021	Lugano	120	(27)
2021–2022	Thun	32	(10)

International career
2010–2013	Sweden	10	(2)
- * Club domestic league appearances and goals as of 21 May 2022

Alexander Clas Robin Gerndt (born 14 July 1986) is a Swedish former professional footballer who played as a striker. A full international between 2010 and 2013, he won ten caps and scored two goals for the Sweden national team.

== Club career ==
=== AIK ===
Born and raised in Visby, on the island of Gotland, Gerndt started to play for the island's top club Visby IF Gute during his youth system. As Gute's second best goal-scorer, he drew attention from Swedish top league clubs such as Örebro SK and AIK. On 3 November 2006, he signed a three-year contract with AIK. In 2007, he only made five appearances in the league, all without scoring. Struggling to make it into the starting 11, he was loaned out to the second-tier club Sirius prior to the 2008 season. In Sirius, he made 14 appearances, scoring six goals.

=== Gefle ===
Although it was thought that he would stay the entire season on loan at Sirius, he signed for Gefle in the top flight division during the summer transfer window of 2008. His start in Gefle was not a success at all; he did not score any goals for the club during 2008. In the season of 2009, Gerndt played 26 out of 30 league games (14 as a starter), scoring 3 goals.

In 2010, he made a major breakthrough in his career. Showing much improvement, he scored 8 goals in the first 14 games for Gefle. As a fact of that, it was rumored that he would make a transfer to the Dutch team Heerenveen in the summer transfer windows of 2010, but also that Helsingborg wanted his signature.

=== Helsingborg ===
On 18 July 2010, it was confirmed that he would move to Helsingborg, signing a 3.5 year contract. Helsingborg were during that time a club fighting to be the Swedish champions of 2010. Gerndt continued to score goals and was a major reason that Helsingborg could battle against their biggest rivals Malmö for the title into the last round of the league. In 15 games, he scored 12 goals and was the top-scorer of Allsvenskan in 2010 with a total of 20 goals. Alexander Gerndt was also named the Player of the Year in the 2010 Allsvenskan. He received the price at a gala in Malmö, the city of Helsingborg's rivals, and was greeted by whistles from the crowd. Alexander Gerndt, however, took his time and waited them out to have utter silence when holding his winning speech.

=== Utrecht ===
Helsingborgs IF, aware there was a big risk that Alexander Gerndt would leave the club, started to look for replacements already in March 2011. Alexander Gerndt was for a while rumored to sign with the Danish club Copenhagen, and on 30 June he confirmed his interest in accepting a 20-million SEK deal with the club. However, on 12 July it was announced that no deal with F.C. Copenhagen would be made.

The same day as that announcement, the Dutch club Utrecht offered Alexander Gerndt a 35-million SEK deal. On 18 July 2011, exactly a year after signing with Helsingborgs IF, Alexander Gerndt signed a four-year contract worth roughly 27 million SEK and joined the club playing in the Eredivisie, the top football league in the Netherlands, on 1 August. The affair was the biggest in Helsingborgs IF's club history.

Alexander Gerndt's first game with FC Utrecht did not come in the team's premiere game of the season on 6 August 2011; the Swedish Discipline Committee suspended Alexander Gerndt between 5–7 August as a result of an incident on 23 July when he punched Malmö player Miljan Mutavdžić in the head, and the suspension was carried over to FC Utrecht as the Dutch Football Association (DFA) was notified by the Swedish Football Association (SFA) of the suspension. Instead, his debut game with FC Utrecht came on 14 August 2011, at home against De Graafschap. The game ended in a 2–2 tie. Alexander Gerndt had a great chance to score the game-winning goal in the second half, but the shot hit the inside post. Gerndt's first goal with Utrecht came instead on 19 September 2011, in a match against Heracles Almelo that finished in another 2–2 tie.

=== Young Boys ===
On 31 January 2013, the last day of the 2012–13 transfer window, it was confirmed that Gerndt had joined Swiss Super League club Young Boys.

=== Lugano ===
Gerndt moved to FC Lugano, also of the Swiss Super League, in August 2017. He signed a contract until 2019. He played his first game just three days after being transferred to Lugano.

=== Thun ===
On 3 July 2021, he signed a contract with Thun in the second-tier Swiss Challenge League for the term of one year with an option for a second year.

== International career ==
Alexander Gerndt scored his first goal for the Sweden national team against Botswana, scoring the 1–0 goal in a game that ended with a 2–1 win for the Swedish team.

== Personal life ==
Gerndt has gone through a divorce with his wife My, and they have two children together. He has talked about his big interest of tattoos and he has said it's like an obsession. "Once you’ve started, you can’t stop; you are always looking for what the next tattoo project can be." Gerndt was also a survivor of the 2004 Indian Ocean earthquake and tsunami.

=== Sentence ===
In December 2011, Gerndt was handed a suspended jail sentence and fined 80,000 SEK for assaulting his ex-wife My. This handed him an indefinite ban from the Sweden national team, as decided by the Swedish Football Association (SvFF). However, the suspension from the national team was lifted on 27 April 2012. Both Gerndt and the prosecutor of the case decided to appeal the sentence on 3 January 2012. Gerndt considered himself not guilty while the prosecutor originally was appealing for a three-month jail sentence.

== Career statistics ==
=== International ===
Appearances and goals by national team and year
National team	Year	Apps	Goals
Sweden	2010	1	0
Sweden	2011	7	2
Sweden	2012	0	0
Sweden	2013	2	0
Total		10	2

Scores and results list Sweden's goal tally first, score column indicates score after each Gerndt goal.

List of international goals scored by Alexander Gerndt
No.	Date	Venue	Opponent	Score	Result	Competition
1	19 January 2011	Cape Town Stadium, Cape Town, South Africa	Botswana	1–0	2–1	Friendly
2	3 June 2011	Zimbru Stadium, Chişinău, Moldova	Moldova	4–1	4–1	UEFA Euro 2012 qualification

== Honours ==
Helsingborg

- Allsvenskan: 2011

Individual

- Allsvenskan top scorer: 2010
- Allsvenskan Player of the Year: 2010
- Swiss Super League Goal of the Year: 2020–21
