= Simon Helg =

Swedish footballer

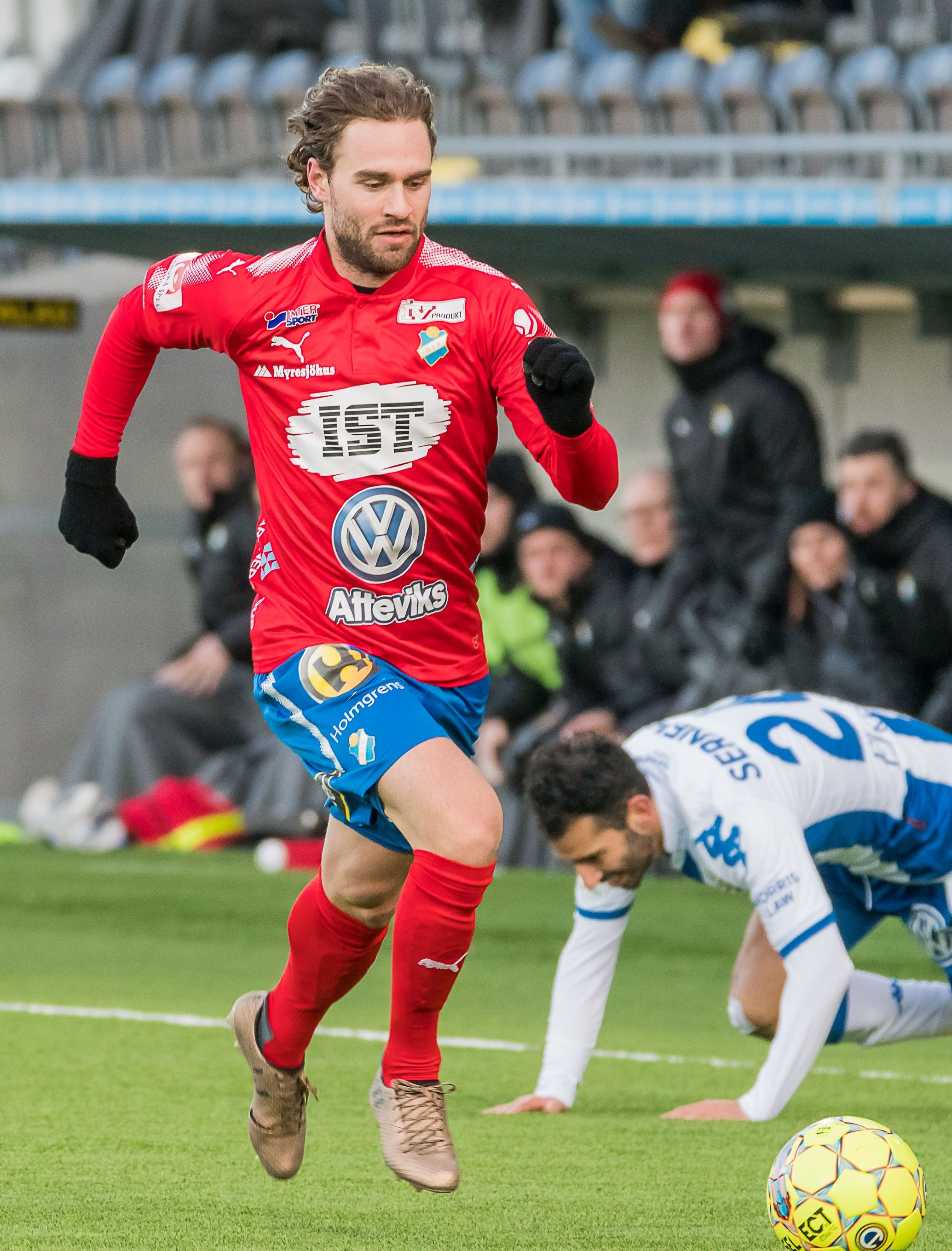
- Helg with Östers IF in 2018

Personal information
- Full name: Simon Tomas Helg
- Date of birth: 10 April 1990 (age 36)
- Place of birth: Sweden
- Height: 1.77 m (5 ft 10 in)
- Position: Left midfielder

Youth career
- Skogstorps GoIF

Senior career*
Years	Team	Apps	(Gls)
2006	IFK Eskilstuna		
2007–2012	Hammarby IF	78	(8)
2007	→ Hammarby TFF	14	(1)
2012–2015	GIF Sundsvall	100	(12)
2016–2017	Åtvidabergs FF	56	(8)
2018–2019	Östers IF	46	(8)
2020–2021	IF Brommapojkarna	52	(6)

International career
2005–2007	Sweden U17	18	(2)
2008–2010	Sweden U19	11	(2)
- * Club domestic league appearances and goals as of 21 November 2021

Simon Helg (born 10 April 1990) is a Swedish footballer who plays as a midfielder.

== Career ==
=== IF Brommapojkarna ===
On 2 February 2020, Helg joined IF Brommapojkarna on a free agent.
