= Marcus Törnstrand =

Swedish footballer

Personal information
- Full name: Marcus Törnstrand
- Date of birth: 10 January 1990 (age 36)
- Place of birth: Stockholm, Sweden
- Height: 1.87 m (6 ft 2 in)
- Position: Defender

Youth career
- Djurgårdens IF
- IF Brommapojkarna

Senior career*
Years	Team	Apps	(Gls)
2008–2012	Hammarby IF	53	(0)
2008–2010	→ Hammarby TFF	32	(1)
2013	Dundee United	1	(0)
2013–2014	Östersunds FK	17	(0)
2020	FC Nacka Iliria	0	(0)

International career
2005–2007	Sweden U17	19	(2)
2008–2010	Sweden U19	14	(1)
2011	Sweden U21	2	(0)
- * Club domestic league appearances and goals as of 08:53, 17 November 2016 (UTC)

Marcus Törnstrand (born 10 January 1990) is a Swedish footballer who plays as a defender, most recently for Östersunds FK in 2014. He previously played for Hammarby IF and in Scotland for Dundee United. He represented the Sweden under-21 team.

== Career ==
As a youth player he represented Djurgårdens IF and IF Brommapojkarna before signing a contract with Hammarby IF in 2008. During the spring in 2008 he played for the club's farm team Hammarby TFF, but due to big injury problems in Hammarby's defensive line he was called up and played seven games for the team during the autumn. He only made one appearance for the team in 2009 in the spring derby against the club's rivals AIK. He also helped Hammarby TFF to gain promotion to Division 1 during the season.

After being released by Hammarby at the end of the 2012 season, Törnstrand signed a short-term contract with Dundee United of the Scottish Premier League on 26 February 2013. He made only one appearance as a substitute before leaving the club at the end of the 2012–13 season.

Törnstrand returned to Sweden, signing for Östersunds FK in June 2013. He left the club at the end of the 2014 season after they decided not to extend his contract.
