= Christer Gustafsson =

Swedish footballer

Personal information
- Date of birth: 31 December 1987 (age 38)
- Place of birth: Stockholm, Sweden
- Height: 1.80 m (5 ft 11 in)
- Position: Midfielder

Youth career
- –2000: Årsta AIK
- 2000–2009: Hammarby IF

Senior career*
Years	Team	Apps	(Gls)
2009–2011	Hammarby IF	26	(4)
2010	→ Hammarby Talang FF (loan)	8	(5)
2012–2019	IK Sirius	173	(30)
2020–2021	IF Brommapojkarna	40	(3)
- * Club domestic league appearances and goals as of 21 November 2021

Christer Gustafsson (born 31 December 1987) is a Swedish footballer.

== Career ==
=== IF Brommapojkarna ===
In December 2019, Gustafsson signed with IF Brommapojkarna.
