= Linus Hallenius =

Swedish footballer (born 1989)

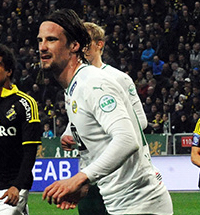
- Hallenius with Hammarby IF in 2015

Personal information
- Date of birth: 1 April 1989 (age 37)
- Place of birth: Sundsvall, Sweden
- Height: 1.85 m (6 ft 1 in)
- Position: Striker

Team information
- Current team: Kubikenborg

Youth career
- Sund IF
- IFK Sundsvall
- Kubikenborgs IF

Senior career*
Years	Team	Apps	(Gls)
2006–2009	GIF Sundsvall	57	(10)
2009–2010	Hammarby IF	31	(18)
2011–2013	Genoa	1	(0)
2011	→ Lugano (loan)	9	(3)
2011–2012	→ Padova (loan)	12	(2)
2013–2014	Aarau	22	(5)
2014–2015	Hammarby IF	32	(5)
2016	Helsingborgs IF	18	(2)
2017–2019	GIF Sundsvall	69	(32)
2019–2020	APOEL	14	(6)
2020	IFK Norrköping	8	(0)
2021–2023	GIF Sundsvall	52	(17)
2024–	Kubikenborg		

International career
2004–2006	Sweden U17	8	(2)
2006–2008	Sweden U19	10	(2)
2009–2010	Sweden U21	3	(0)
- * Club domestic league appearances and goals as of 15 November 2023

Linus Hallenius (born 1 April 1989) is a Swedish professional footballer who plays as a striker for Kubikenborg.

== Career ==
Born in Sundsvall, Hallenius started his professional career with GIF Sundsvall, and is widely regarded as one of their greatest players of all time.

During the transfer period on the summer of 2009 there were rumors that Hallenius was close to sign for Örgryte IS and several news papers went out with the news that Örgryte IS had signed him, which was denied by the club. Although the fact was that the club had made an agreement with GIF Sundsvall, but Hallenius hesitated about the transfer. On 7 July 2009, Hallenius signed a 3.5-year contract with Hammarby IF in the Allsvenskan. During the autumn of 2009, Hallenius made 8 appearances of which he played 4 as a starter, but did not score a goal. Hammarby IF were relegated to Superettan. During the 2010 season, Hallenius scored 18 goals in 23 matches, including a goal away against Syrianska FC on 20 June 2010 which was described as "wonderful" and "fantastic" and which was compared to a famous Marco van Basten goal. It was voted second in the FIFA Puskás Award.

On 1 September 2010, Hallenius signed for Genoa who immediately loaned him back to Hammarby for the rest of the 2010 season. He joined up with his new teammates on 4 January 2011.

== Career statistics ==
As of 16 September 2020

Appearances and goals by club, season and competition
Club	Season	League			Cup		Continental		Other		Total	
Club	Season	Division	Apps	Goals	Apps	Goals	Apps	Goals	Apps	Goals	Apps	Goals
GIF Sundsvall	2006	Superettan	2	0	0	0	—		—		2	0
GIF Sundsvall	2007	Superettan	14	4	0	0	—		—		14	4
GIF Sundsvall	2008	Allsvenskan	28	3	0	0	—		—		28	3
GIF Sundsvall	2009	Superettan	13	3	3	1	—		—		16	4
GIF Sundsvall	Total		57	10	3	1	—		—		60	11
Hammarby IF	2009	Allsvenskan	8	0	0	0	—		—		8	0
Hammarby IF	2010	Superettan	23	18	1	1	—		—		24	19
Hammarby IF	Total		31	18	1	1	—		—		32	19
Genoa	2010–11	Serie A	0	0	0	0	—		—		0	0
Genoa	2011–12	Serie A	0	0	0	0	—		—		0	0
Genoa	2012–13	Serie A	1	0	0	0	—		—		1	0
Genoa	Total		1	0	0	0	—		—		1	0
Lugano (loan)	2010–11	Swiss Challenge League	9	3	0	0	—		—		9	3
Padova (loan)	2011–12	Serie B	12	2	2	0	—		—		14	2
FC Aarau	2013–14	Swiss Super League	22	5	0	0	—		—		22	5
Hammarby IF	2014	Superettan	9	2			—		—		9	2
Hammarby IF	2015	Allsvenskan	23	3	4	1	—		—		27	4
Hammarby IF	Total		32	5	4	1	—		—		36	6
Helsingborgs IF	2016	Allsvenskan	18	2	4	2	—		—		22	4
GIF Sundsvall	2017	Allsvenskan	27	8	1	0	—		—		28	8
GIF Sundsvall	2018	Allsvenskan	29	18	3	2	—		—		32	20
GIF Sundsvall	2019	Allsvenskan	13	6	0	0	—		—		13	6
GIF Sundsvall	Total		69	32	4	2	—		—		73	34
APOEL	2019–20	Cypriot First Division	14	6	1	0	10	1	1	0	26	7
IFK Norrköping	2020	Allsvenskan	7	0	0	0	—		—		7	0
Career total			272	83	19	7	10	1	1	0	302	91
