= Värmdö IF =

Swedish football club

- Full name: Värmdö Idrottsförening
- Founded: 1948
- Ground: Värmdövallen, Värmdö
- Capacity: 2,000
- Chairman: Dan Törnsten
- Head coach: Jussi Kontinen
- League: Division 3 Södra Svealand
- 2018: Division 2 Södra Svealand, 13th (Relegated)
Home colours

Värmdö IF is a Swedish football club located in Värmdö Municipality in Stockholm County.

== Background ==
Since their foundation in 1948 Värmdö IF has participated mainly in the lower divisions of the Swedish football league system. The club currently plays in Division 3 Södra Svealand which is the fourth tier of Swedish football. They play their home matches at the Värmdövallen in Värmdö.

The U-19 team is 2013 playing in the first division in Stockholms Fotbollförbund U-19.

The club is affiliated to the Stockholms Fotbollförbund.

== Season to season ==
Season	Level	Division	Section	Position	Movements
1999	Tier 5	Division 4	Stockholm Mellersta	4th	
2000	Tier 5	Division 4	Stockholm Mellersta	5th	
2001	Tier 5	Division 4	Stockholm Mellersta	3rd	
2002	Tier 5	Division 4	Stockholm Mellersta	2nd	Promotion Playoffs – Promoted
2003	Tier 4	Division 3	Östra Svealand	4th	
2004	Tier 4	Division 3	Östra Svealand	5th	
2005	Tier 4	Division 3	Östra Svealand	6th	
2006*	Tier 5	Division 3	Östra Svealand	4th	
2007	Tier 5	Division 3	Östra Svealand	4th	
2008	Tier 5	Division 3	Södra Svealand	1st	Promoted
2009	Tier 4	Division 2	Östra Svealand	4th	
2010	Tier 4	Division 2	Södra Svealand	5th	
2011	Tier 4	Division 2	Södra Svealand	9th	
2012	Tier 4	Division 2	Södra Svealand	6th	
2013	Tier 4	Division 2	Södra Svealand		

* League restructuring in 2006 resulted in a new division being created at Tier 3 and subsequent divisions dropping a level.
