= Mattias Lindström (footballer) =

Swedish footballer (born 1980)

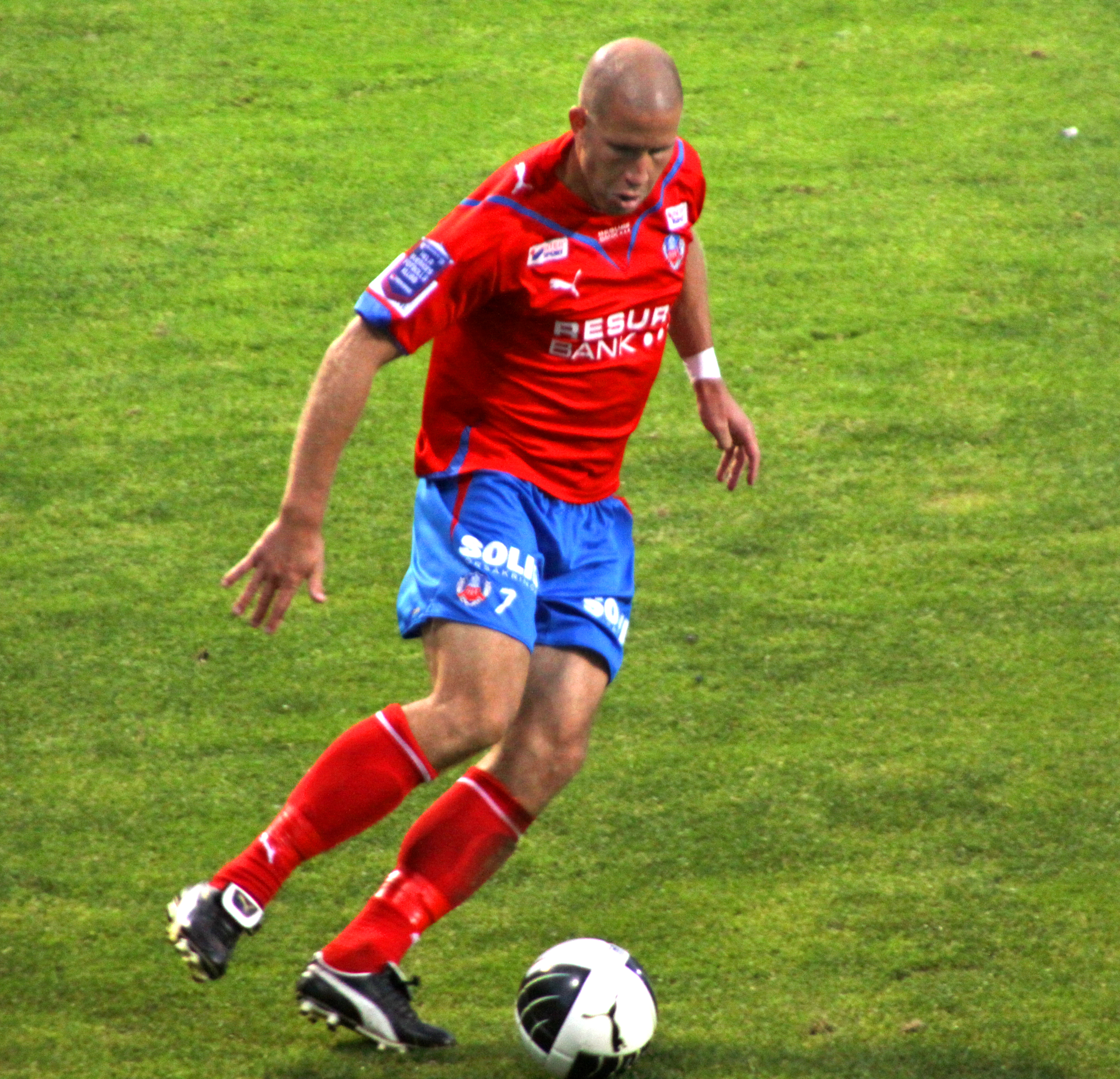

Personal information
- Full name: Karl Mattias Lindström
- Date of birth: 18 April 1980 (age 46)
- Place of birth: Helsingborg, Sweden
- Height: 1.80 m (5 ft 11 in)
- Position: Midfielder

Team information
- Current team: Ödåkra IF

Youth career
- Helsingborgs IF

Senior career*
Years	Team	Apps	(Gls)
1997–2004	Helsingborgs IF	116	(25)
2004–2007	Aalborg BK	88	(9)
2008	FC Wacker Innsbruck	13	(0)
2008–2009	SV Mattersburg	20	(1)
2009	GAIS	27	(4)
2010–2015	Helsingborgs IF	144	(21)
2016	Ödåkra IF	13	(4)
Total		421	(64)

International career
1999–2001	Sweden U21	13	(1)
2003	Sweden	3	(0)

Managerial career
- 2017–2018: Tvååkers IF
- 2019–2020: Eskilsminne IF
- 2020: Tvååkers IF
- 2022–2023: Helsingborgs IF
- * Club domestic league appearances and goals

Karl Mattias Lindström (born 18 April 1980) is a Swedish former professional footballer who played as a midfielder. He represented Helsingborgs IF, Aalborg BK, FC Wacker Innsbruck, SV Mattersburg, and GAIS before retiring at Helsingborg in 2015. A full international for the Sweden national team, he won three caps in 2003.

== Club career ==
Lindström played for SV Mattersburg from June 2008 to March 2009 before his contract was terminated. Thereafter, Lindström signed with GAIS. He joined Innsbruck in 2008, signing from Aalborg Boldspilklub of the Danish Superliga championship. Before moving to Denmark, Lindström played eight seasons for Swedish team Helsingborgs IF, for whom he debuted in 1997. In January 2010, he returned to his youth club Helsingborgs IF and signed a three-year contract. In 2013, he managed to score in all of the first 6 rounds of Allsvenskan - a new all-time record for Allsvenskan.

== International career ==
Lindström played three times for the Sweden men's national football team. He was part of the Sweden team that won the 2003 King's Cup.

== Honours ==
Sweden

- King's Cup: 2003
