= Erik Sundin =

Swedish footballer

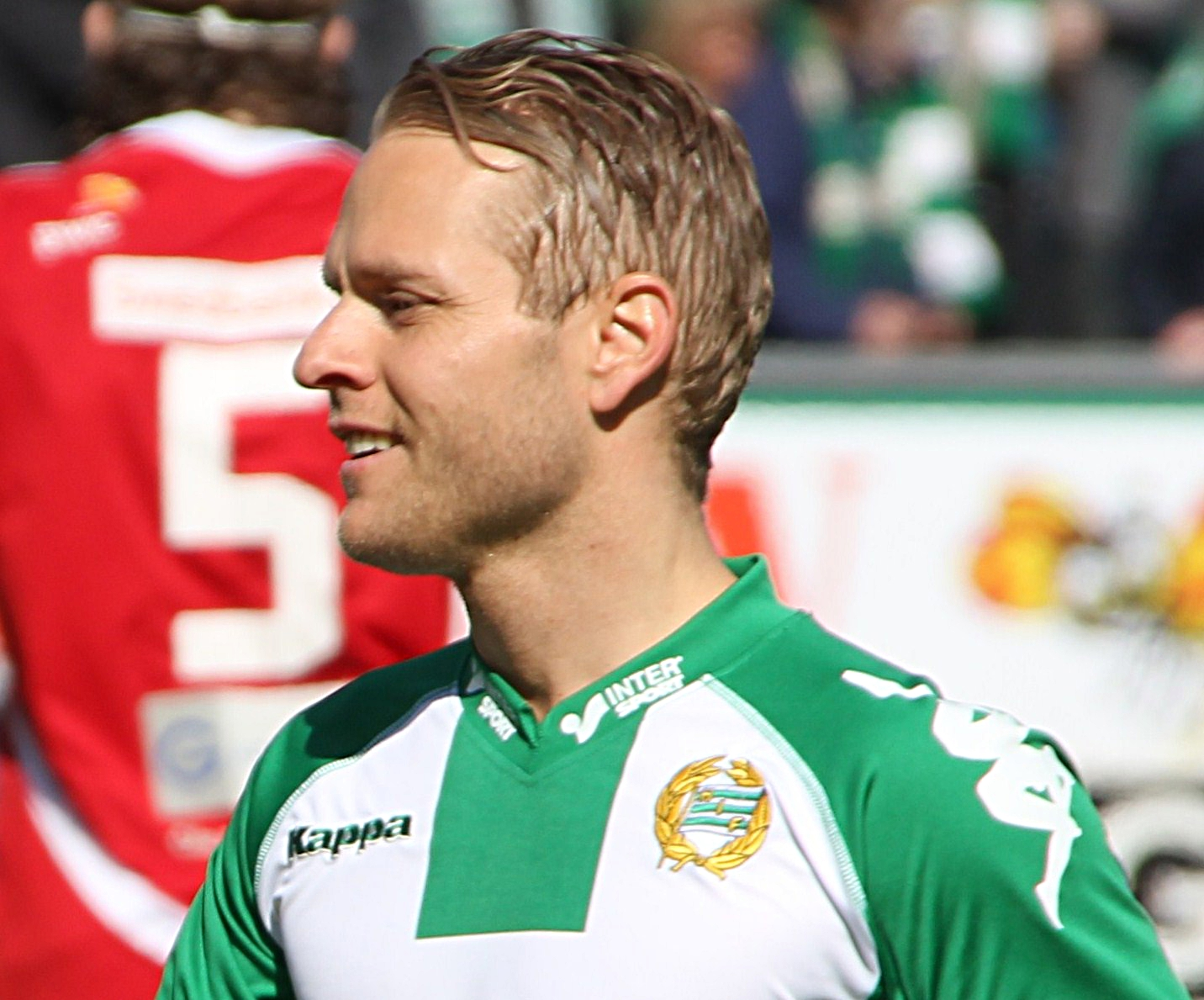

Personal information
- Full name: Erik Daniel Victor Sundin
- Date of birth: 1 March 1979 (age 47)
- Place of birth: Stockholm, Sweden
- Height: 1.72 m (5 ft 8 in)
- Position: Forward

Team information
- Current team: Hammarby IF
- Number: 18

Youth career
- 1985–1997: AIK

Senior career*
Years	Team	Apps	(Gls)
1998–1999	Enebybergs IF	19	(3)
2000–2004	Café Opera United	80	(19)
2005	Väsby United	25	(4)
2006	Assyriska FF	27	(6)
2007–2008	Trelleborgs FF	49	(8)
2009–2012	Helsingborgs IF	88	(23)
2012–2013	Hammarby IF	35	(8)
- * Club domestic league appearances and goals as of 31 December 2013

Erik Daniel Victor Sundin (born 1 March 1979) is a Swedish retired footballer who played for Hammarby IF in Superettan as a forward. He also played for AIK, Enebybergs IF, Café Opera United, Väsby United, Assyriska FF, Trelleborgs FF and Helsingborgs IF.
