= 2011 Superettan =

Superettan
- Season: 2011
- Champions: Åtvidaberg
- Promoted: Åtvidaberg; GIF Sundsvall
- Relegated: Västerås SK; Qviding FIF
- Matches: 240
- Goals: 685 (2.85 per match)
- Top goalscorer: Branimir Hrgota (18)
- Biggest home win: GIF Sundsvall 6–0 Ängelholm (30 September 2011)
- Biggest away win: Qviding FIF 0–5 Assyriska (22 October 2011)
- Highest scoring: Västerås SK 3–5 Degerfors (11 September 2011)
- Highest attendance: 12,801; Hammarby 2–1 Landskrona (18 April 2011)
- Lowest attendance: 167; Qviding FIF 0–2 Brommapojkarna (12 September 2011)
- Average attendance: 2,423

The 2011 Superettan was part of the 2011 Swedish football season, and the twelfth season of Superettan, Sweden's second-tier football division in its current format. The season began on 9 April 2011 and ended on 22 October 2011.

The top two teams qualified directly for promotion to Allsvenskan, the third played a play-off against the fourteenth from Allsvenskan to decide who qualified to play in Allsvenskan 2012.

The bottom two teams qualified directly for relegation to Division 1, the thirteenth and the fourteenth played a play-off against the numbers two from Division 1 Södra and Division 1 Norra to decide who qualified to play in Superettan 2012.

== Teams ==
A total of sixteen teams contested the league, including eleven sides from the 2010 season, two relegated teams from 2010 Allsvenskan, two promoted teams from Division 1 and Qviding FIF who replaced Örgryte IS after they were automatically relegated to Division 1 before the start of the new season due to bankruptcy.

FC Trollhättan and Väsby United were relegated at the end of the 2010 season after finishing in the bottom two places of the table. They were replaced by Division 1 Norra champions Västerås SK and Division 1 Södra champions IFK Värnamo.

Jönköpings Södra IF and Östers IF both retained their Superettan spots after defeating their Division 1 opponents in a relegation/promotion playoff.

=== Stadia and locations ===
Location of the Superettan 2011 teams

Team	Location	Stadium	Stadium capacity^{1}
Assyriska FF	Södertälje	Södertälje Fotbollsarena	7,500
Degerfors IF	Degerfors	Stora Valla	12,500
Falkenbergs FF	Falkenberg	Falkenbergs IP	6,000
GIF Sundsvall	Sundsvall	Norrporten Arena	8,000
Hammarby IF	Stockholm	Söderstadion	15,600
IF Brommapojkarna	Stockholm	Grimsta IP	8,000
IFK Värnamo	Värnamo	Finnvedsvallen	5,000
IK Brage	Borlänge	Domnarvsvallen	5,500
Jönköpings Södra IF	Jönköping	Stadsparksvallen	5,200
Landskrona BoIS	Landskrona	Landskrona IP	12,000
Ljungskile SK	Ljungskile	Starke Arvid Arena	8,000
Qviding FIF	Gothenburg	Valhalla IP	4,000
Västerås SK	Västerås	Swedbank Park	7,000
Åtvidabergs FF	Åtvidaberg	Kopparvallen	8,000
Ängelholms FF	Ängelholm	Ängelholms IP	5,000
Östers IF	Växjö	Värendsvallen	13,000

- ^{1} Correct as of end of 2010 Superettan season

=== Personnel and kits ===
Note: Flags indicate national team as has been defined under FIFA eligibility rules. Players and Managers may hold more than one non-FIFA nationality.

Team	Head coach	Captain	Kit manufacturer	Shirt sponsor
Assyriska FF	(Republic of Ireland) Pat Walker	(Sweden) Göran Marklund	Nike	Scania
IK Brage	(Sweden) Lennart Andersson	(Sweden) Niklas Forslund	Puma SE	SSAB
IF Brommapojkarna	(Sweden) Roberth Björknesjö	(Sweden) Pontus Segerström	adidas	Various
Degerfors IF	(Sweden) Patrik Werner	(Sweden) Tobias Solberg	adidas	Outokumpu
Falkenbergs FF	(Sweden) Thomas Askebrand	(Sweden) David Svensson	Nike	Various
Hammarby IF	(Sweden) Roger Sandberg	(Guinea-Bissau) José Monteiro	Kappa	Pepsi
Jönköpings Södra IF	(Sweden) Hans Lindbom	(Sweden) Dennis Östlundh	Nike	Various
Landskrona BoIS	(Sweden) Henrik Larsson	(Sweden) Linus Malmqvist	Umbro	Various
Ljungskile SK	(Sweden) Bo Wålemark (Sweden) Örjan Glans	(Sweden) Johan Patriksson	Umbro	Various
Qviding FIF	(Sweden) Lars Ternström	(Sweden) Christian Lindström	Puma	ICA
GIF Sundsvall	(Sweden) Sören Åkeby	(Sweden) Jonas Wallerstedt	adidas	Norrporten
IFK Värnamo	(Sweden) Tony Johansson (Sweden) Glenn Ståhl	(Sweden) Tobias Englund	adidas	Various
Västerås SK	(Sweden) Erik Acar	(Sweden) Oscar Pehrsson	Nike	Various
Åtvidabergs FF	(Sweden) Andreas Thomsson	(Sweden) Henrik Gustavsson	Uhlsport	Sharp
Ängelholms FF	(Sweden) Christoffer Skoog (Sweden) Joakim Persson	(Sweden) Jakob Augustsson	adidas	Peab
Östers IF	(Sweden) Roar Hansen	(Sweden) Denis Velić	Umbro	ICA

=== Managerial changes ===
Team	Outgoing manager	Manner of departure	Date of vacancy	Table	Incoming manager	Date of appointment	Table
Brage	(Sweden) Pelle Johansson	Sacked	5 May 2011		(Sweden) Lennart Andersson	5 May 2011	
Assyriska FF	(Sweden) Rikard Norling	Signed by Malmö FF	3 June 2011		(Sweden) Göran Marklund (as caretaker)	3 June 2011	
Västerås SK	(Sweden) Kalle Granath	Sacked	24 June 2011		(Sweden) Erik Acar	24 June 2011	
Assyriska FF	(Sweden) Göran Marklund	End of tenure as caretaker	2 August 2011	7th	(Republic of Ireland) Pat Walker	2 August 2011	7th
Hammarby	(Sweden) Roger Franzén	Sacked	18 August 2011	10th	(Sweden) Roger Sandberg (as caretaker)	18 August 2011	10th

== League table ==
Pos	Team	Pld	W	D	L	GF	GA	GD	Pts	Promotion, qualification or relegation
1	Åtvidabergs FF (C, P)	30	18	3	9	58	31	+27	57	Promotion to Allsvenskan
2	GIF Sundsvall (P)	30	16	7	7	61	29	+32	55	Promotion to Allsvenskan
3	Ängelholms FF	30	15	8	7	47	40	+7	53	Qualification to Promotion playoffs
4	Östers IF	30	14	8	8	40	28	+12	50	
5	Degerfors IF	30	14	6	10	53	44	+9	48	
6	IF Brommapojkarna	30	14	5	11	50	38	+12	47	
7	Falkenbergs FF	30	14	3	13	50	43	+7	45	
8	Ljungskile SK	30	12	6	12	48	39	+9	42	
9	Assyriska FF	30	12	5	13	39	41	−2	41	
10	Landskrona BoIS	30	11	8	11	36	39	−3	41	
11	Hammarby IF	30	11	7	12	37	40	−3	40	
12	Jönköpings Södra IF	30	12	4	14	47	53	−6	40	
13	IFK Värnamo (O)	30	10	9	11	43	51	−8	39	Qualification to Relegation playoffs
14	IK Brage (O)	30	7	10	13	30	50	−20	31	Qualification to Relegation playoffs
15	Västerås SK (R)	30	7	7	16	39	66	−27	28	Relegation to Division 1
16	Qviding FIF (R)	30	1	8	21	17	63	−46	11	Relegation to Division 1

Source: svenskfotboll.se (in Swedish)
Rules for classification: 1) points; 2) goal difference; 3) number of goals scored.
(C) Champions; (O) Play-off winners; (P) Promoted; (R) Relegated

== Relegation play-offs ==
29 October 2011
15:00

Sylvia	1–3	Brage
Nyman 54'	Report	Åkervall 10', 53'; Jevtushenko 44'

Idrottsparken, Norrköping
Attendance: 1,180
Referee: Kristoffer Karlsson (Gothenburg)
5 November 2011
15:00

Brage	4–2	Sylvia
Åkervall 10' (pen.), 50', 83'; Faltsetas 57'	Report	Roxström 75', 85'

Domnarvsvallen, Borlänge
Attendance: 2,319
Referee: Bojan Pandžić (Gothenburg)

Brage won 7–3 on aggregate.

30 October 2011
16:00

Väsby United	0–2	IFK Värnamo
	Report	Andronic 24'; Kozica 29'

Skytteholms IP, Solna
Attendance: 674
Referee: Magnus Ahlsén (Linköping)
6 November 2011
15:00

IFK Värnamo	1–0	Väsby United
Zlojutro 22'	Report

Finnvedsvallen, Värnamo
Attendance: 1,952
Referee: Andreas Ekberg (Lund)

IFK Värnamo won 3–0 on aggregate.

== Results ==
Home \ Away	AFF	DIF	FFF	GIFS	HAM	BP	IFKV	IKB	JSIF	LAN	LSK	QFIF	VSK	ÅFF	ÄFF	ÖIF
Assyriska FF		1–1	2–1	0–1	1–0	0–2	0–1	3–2	1–0	1–2	1–0	0–1	0–2	2–0	2–2	0–0
Degerfors IF	2–3		1–3	0–2	3–2	1–0	2–0	5–0	6–1	2–0	2–3	3–0	4–1	1–2	1–3	3–3
Falkenbergs FF	4–0	4–0		2–4	1–1	1–3	4–0	0–2	1–2	5–1	2–0	3–0	3–4	0–2	1–0	0–4
GIF Sundsvall	1–2	3–0	4–0		3–3	0–0	2–2	5–0	3–0	2–0	3–0	4–0	2–2	0–1	6–0	2–1
Hammarby IF	0–0	1–2	0–0	1–3		1–2	1–0	1–0	5–2	2–1	1–3	2–1	3–1	2–0	0–1	2–1
IF Brommapojkarna	1–3	3–3	2–1	1–3	1–0		1–3	3–0	1–1	1–1	3–1	4–0	4–1	2–2	0–1	1–0
IFK Värnamo	3–2	0–0	0–2	3–0	1–0	2–1		3–1	2–4	3–1	0–2	0–0	2–3	3–3	1–1	0–1
IK Brage	3–0	1–1	2–2	0–0	0–0	0–2	2–2		1–1	0–1	1–1	2–2	2–0	1–0	1–4	0–0
Jönköpings Södra IF	1–1	0–1	0–2	2–1	0–2	4–2	2–3	3–0		0–2	2–1	1–0	5–1	1–0	3–0	0–3
Landskrona BoIS	2–3	0–0	0–2	1–2	3–0	0–2	1–1	1–2	1–0		0–0	3–0	2–1	3–2	0–0	1–0
Ljungskile SK	1–0	1–0	0–1	3–1	4–1	1–3	5–1	1–2	2–3	0–0		2–1	5–0	1–2	1–2	0–0
Qviding FIF	0–5	0–1	0–1	0–2	2–2	0–2	0–2	1–2	1–1	1–1	1–4		0–1	1–3	1–3	1–1
Västerås SK	0–2	3–5	1–2	0–0	1–2	1–0	2–2	2–1	4–2	3–3	0–1	2–2		0–2	1–2	1–1
Åtvidabergs FF	2–1	1–2	4–0	2–0	3–1	2–1	5–2	2–0	2–1	1–0	2–2	4–0	4–0		5–0	0–1
Ängelholms FF	2–1	3–0	3–2	1–1	0–1	3–2	1–1	1–1	2–4	1–2	1–1	0–0	3–1	2–0		3–0
Östers IF	4–2	0–1	1–0	2–1	0–0	2–0	2–0	3–1	2–1	2–3	3–2	2–1	0–0	1–0	0–2	

Source: svenskfotboll.se (in Swedish)
Legend: Blue = home team win; Yellow = draw; Red = away team win.

== Season statistics ==
=== Top scorers ===
Rank	Player	Club	Goals
1	(Sweden) Branimir Hrgota	Jönköpings Södra	18
2	(Sweden) Peter Samuelsson	Degerfors	17
3	(Sweden) Magnus Eriksson	Åtvidaberg	15
4	(Sweden) Pablo Piñones-Arce	Brommapojkarna	14
4	(Sweden) Fredrik Holster	GIF Sundsvall	14
6	(Sweden) Viktor Claesson	IFK Värnamo	13
6	(Sweden) Pontus Engblom	GIF Sundsvall	13
6	(Sweden) Stefan Rodevåg	Falkenberg	13
9	(Sweden) Mattias Mete	Västerås SK	12
9	(Sweden) Sebastian Andersson	Ängelholm	12
9	(Sweden) Oscar Möller	Åtvidaberg	12
12	(Sweden) Emil Forsberg	GIF Sundsvall	11
13	3 players		10
16	3 players		9
19	5 players		8
24	5 players		7

=== Top assists ===
Rank	Player	Club	Assists
1	(Sweden) Tobias Nilsson	Falkenberg	12
2	(Sweden) Kristian Bergström	Åtvidaberg	10
3	(Serbia) Haris Radetinac	Åtvidaberg	9
3	(Sweden) Johan Patriksson	Ljungskile	9
3	(Sweden) Richard Nilsson	Ljungskile	9
6	(Sweden) Viktor Claesson	IFK Värnamo	8
6	(Sweden) Jonathan Ring	IFK Värnamo	8
6	(Sweden) Andreas Tegström	Jönköpings Södra	8
9	(Ukraine) Vyacheslav Jevtushenko	Brage	7
9	(Paraguay) Antonio Rojas	Ängelholm	7
9	(Sweden) Jesper Arvidsson	Åtvidaberg	7
9	(Sweden) Tommy Thelin	Jönköpings Södra	7
13	5 players		6
18	9 players		5
27	10 players		4
37	35 players		3

=== Top goalkeepers ===
(Minimum of 10 games played)

Rank	Goalkeeper	Club	GP	GA	SV%	ShO
1	(Sweden) Ivo Vazgeč	Landskrona BoIS; Jönköping Södra	25	29	80	7
2	(Sweden) Tommy Naurin	GIF Sundsvall	28	25	78	14
3	(Sweden) Joakim Wulff	Öster	27	25	77	11
3	(United States) Brian Edwards	Degerfors	28	41	77	9
5	(Sweden) Kristoffer Nordfeldt	Brommapojkarna	28	37	76	8
5	(Bosnia and Herzegovina) Stojan Lukic	Falkenberg	30	43	76	12
7	(Sweden) Johannes Hopf	Hammarby	30	39	75	9
8	(Sweden) Henrik Gustavsson	Åtvidaberg	30	31	74	10
8	(Sweden) Niklas Helgesson	Jönköpings Södra	17	32	74	3
10	(Sweden) Mirza Selimović	Landskrona BoIS	18	27	73	4
10	(Sweden) Oscar Berglund	Assyriska	29	38	73	8
10	(United States) Matt Pyzdrowski	Ängelholm	30	40	73	8
10	(Sweden) Bill Halvorsen	IFK Värnamo	13	17	73	4
10	(Sierra Leone) Christian Caulker	Västerås SK	14	25	73	4

=== Hat-tricks ===
Player	For	Against	Result	Date
(Sweden) Pär Cederqvist	Jönköpings Södra	Västerås SK	5–1	16 April 2011
(Sweden) Stefan Rodevåg	Falkenberg	Västerås SK	3–4	1 May 2011
(Sweden) Peter Samuelsson	Degerfors	Brage	5–0	25 June 2011
(Sweden) Pablo Piñones-Arce	Brommapojkarna	Ljungskile	3–1	27 June 2011
(Sweden) Branimir Hrgota	Jönköpings Södra	Brage	3–0	16 July 2011
(Sweden) Freddy Borg	Öster	Assyriska	4–2	7 August 2011
(Sweden) Peter Samuelsson	Degerfors	Hammarby	3–2	4 September 2011
(Sweden) Mattias Mete	Västerås SK	Degerfors	3–5	11 September 2011
(Sweden) Mikael Boman^{4}	Falkenberg	Assyriska	4–0	11 September 2011
(Sweden) Jones Kusi-Asare	Assyriska	Qviding	5–0	22 October 2011

- ^{4} Player scored 4 goals

=== Attendance ===
Club	Home		Away		Total	
Club	Average	Total	Average	Total	Average	Total
Hammarby IF	7,953	119,299	4,082	61,236	6,018	180,535
GIF Sundsvall	3,572	53,586	1,812	27,177	2,692	80,763
Landskrona BoIS	2,929	43,940	2,664	39,958	2,797	83,898
Degerfors IF	2,739	41,079	2,259	33,883	2,499	74,962
Åtvidabergs FF	2,640	39,594	2,906	43,594	2,773	83,188
Östers IF	2,637	39,561	2,626	39,388	2,632	78,949
IK Brage	2,408	36,126	2,159	32,387	2,284	68,513
Jönköpings Södra IF	2,347	35,205	2,474	37,104	2,410	72,309
Assyriska FF	2,319	34,784	2,176	32,639	2,247	67,423
Västerås SK FK	1,927	28,905	2,159	32,382	2,043	61,287
IFK Värnamo	1,926	28,890	2,364	35,464	2,145	64,354
Falkenbergs FF	1,382	20,736	2,295	34,418	1,838	55,154
Ängelholms FF	1,263	18,947	2,618	39,266	1,940	58,213
Ljungskile SK	1,175	17,629	2,322	34,828	1,749	52,457
IF Brommapojkarna	1,065	15,974	1,906	28,594	1,486	44,568
Qviding FIF	482	7,228	1,944	29,165	1,213	36,393
League	2,423	581,483				

== See also ==
Competitions

- 2011 Allsvenskan
- 2011 Svenska Cupen
- 2011 Supercupen

Transfers

- List of Swedish football transfers winter 2010–2011
- List of Swedish football transfers summer 2011
- List of Swedish football transfers winter 2011–2012
