= 2011 in Swedish football =

Football in Sweden
- Season: 2011

Men's football
- Allsvenskan: Helsingborgs IF
- Superettan: Åtvidabergs FF
- Division 1: Umeå FC (Norra); Varbergs BoIS (Södra)
- Svenska Cupen: Helsingborgs IF
- Svenska Supercupen: Helsingborgs IF

The 2011 season in Swedish football, started in January 2011 and ended in December 2011.

== Honours ==
=== Official titles ===
Title	Team	Reason
Swedish Champions 2011	Helsingborgs IF	Winners of Allsvenskan
Swedish Cup Champions 2011	Helsingborgs IF	Winners of Svenska Cupen
Swedish Super Cup Champions 2011	Helsingborgs IF	Winners of Supercupen

=== Competitions ===
Level	Competition	Team
1st level	Allsvenskan 2011	Helsingborgs IF
2nd level	Superettan 2011	Åtvidabergs FF
3rd level	Division 1 Norra 2011	Umeå FC
3rd level	Division 1 Södra 2011	Varbergs BoIS
Cup	Svenska Cupen 2011	Helsingborgs IF
Super Cup	Supercupen 2011	Helsingborgs IF

== Promotions, relegations and qualifications ==
=== Promotions ===
Promoted from	Promoted to	Team	Reason
Superettan 2011	Allsvenskan 2012	Åtvidabergs FF	Winners
Superettan 2011	Allsvenskan 2012	GIF Sundsvall	Runners-up
Division 1 Norra 2011	Superettan 2012	Umeå FC	Winners
Division 1 Södra 2011	Superettan 2012	Varbergs BoIS	Winners
Division 2 2011	Division 1 Norra 2012	Östersunds FK	Winners of group
Division 2 2011	Division 1 Norra 2012	Enköpings SK	Winners of group
Division 2 2011	Division 1 Norra 2012	Eskilstuna City FK	Winners of group
Division 2 2011	Division 1 Norra 2012	Sandvikens IF	Runners-up of group Replaced IFK Klagshamn
Division 2 2011	Division 1 Södra 2012	Utsiktens BK	Winners of group
Division 2 2011	Division 1 Södra 2012	IK Gauthiod	Winners of group

=== Relegations ===
Relegated from	Relegated to	Team	Reason
Allsvenskan 2011	Superettan 2012	Trelleborgs FF	15th team
Allsvenskan 2011	Superettan 2012	Halmstads BK	16th team
Superettan 2011	Division 1 Norra 2012	Västerås SK	15th team
Superettan 2011	Division 1 Södra 2012	Qviding FIF	16th team
Division 1 Norra 2011	Division 2 2012	Valsta Syrianska IK	12th team
Division 1 Norra 2011	Division 2 2012	Bodens BK	13th team
Division 1 Norra 2011	Division 2 2012	Hammarby TFF	14th team
Division 1 Södra 2011	Division 2 2012	FC Rosengård	12th team
Division 1 Södra 2011	Division 2 2012	Husqvarna FF	13th team
Division 1 Södra 2011	Division 2 2012	Motala AIF	14th team

=== International qualifications ===
Qualified for	Enters	Team	Reason
UEFA Champions League 2012–13	2nd qual. round	Helsingborgs IF	Winners of Allsvenskan
UEFA Europa League 2012–13	2nd qual. round	AIK	Runners-up of Allsvenskan
UEFA Europa League 2012–13	1st qual. round	IF Elfsborg	3rd team in Allsvenskan
UEFA Europa League 2012–13	1st qual. round	Kalmar FF	Runners-up of Svenska Cupen

== Domestic results ==
=== 2011 Allsvenskan ===
Locations of the 2011 Allsvenskan teams

Pos	Team	Pld	W	D	L	GF	GA	GD	Pts	Qualification or relegation
1	Helsingborgs IF (C)	30	18	9	3	55	27	+28	63	Qualification to Champions League second qualifying round
2	AIK	30	18	4	8	46	27	+19	58	Qualification to Europa League second qualifying round (Note: AIK qualified for the second qualifying round of the UEFA Europa League as they received the qualifying spot reserved for the winner of 2011 Svenska Cupen, as cup winner Helsingborg were already qualified to the UEFA Champions League through winning Allsvenskan. Kalmar FF, Svenska Cupen runners-up 2011, qualified for the first qualifying round of the UEFA Europa League.)
3	IF Elfsborg	30	18	3	9	52	32	+20	57	Qualification to Europa League first qualifying round
4	Malmö FF	30	15	9	6	37	30	+7	54	
5	GAIS	30	16	3	11	47	34	+13	51	
6	BK Häcken	30	14	7	9	52	32	+20	49	
7	IFK Göteborg	30	13	6	11	42	34	+8	45	
8	Kalmar FF	30	13	5	12	39	34	+5	44	Qualification to Europa League first qualifying round
9	Gefle IF	30	10	11	9	31	39	−8	41	
10	Mjällby AIF	30	12	4	14	33	39	−6	40	
11	Djurgårdens IF	30	10	6	14	36	40	−4	36	
12	Örebro SK	30	11	3	16	36	45	−9	36	
13	IFK Norrköping	30	9	7	14	32	49	−17	34	
14	Syrianska FC (O)	30	8	4	18	27	44	−17	28	Qualification to Relegation play-offs
15	Trelleborgs FF (R)	30	7	4	19	39	64	−25	25	Relegation to Superettan
16	Halmstads BK (R)	30	3	5	22	24	58	−34	14	Relegation to Superettan

Source: svenskfotboll.se (in Swedish)
Rules for classification: 1) points; 2) goal difference; 3) number of goals scored.
(C) Champions; (O) Play-off winners; (R) Relegated

=== 2011 Allsvenskan qualification play-off ===
27 October 2011
19:20

Ängelholm	2–1	Syrianska FC
Andersson 53'; Blomberg 79'	Report	Ijeh 50'

Ängelholms IP, Ängelholm
Attendance: 1,609
Referee: Markus Strömbergsson (Gävle)

30 October 2011
17:20

Syrianska FC	3–1	Ängelholm
Barsom 53'; Arneng 66'; Bennhage 90+2' (o.g.)	Report	Andersson 58'

Södertälje Fotbollsarena, Södertälje
Attendance: 4,273
Referee: Stefan Johannesson (Stocksund)

Syrianska FC won 4–3 on aggregate.

=== 2011 Superettan ===
Location of the Superettan 2011 teams

Pos	Team	Pld	W	D	L	GF	GA	GD	Pts	Promotion, qualification or relegation
1	Åtvidabergs FF (C, P)	30	18	3	9	58	31	+27	57	Promotion to Allsvenskan
2	GIF Sundsvall (P)	30	16	7	7	61	29	+32	55	Promotion to Allsvenskan
3	Ängelholms FF	30	15	8	7	47	40	+7	53	Qualification to Promotion playoffs
4	Östers IF	30	14	8	8	40	28	+12	50	
5	Degerfors IF	30	14	6	10	53	44	+9	48	
6	IF Brommapojkarna	30	14	5	11	50	38	+12	47	
7	Falkenbergs FF	30	14	3	13	50	43	+7	45	
8	Ljungskile SK	30	12	6	12	48	39	+9	42	
9	Assyriska FF	30	12	5	13	39	41	−2	41	
10	Landskrona BoIS	30	11	8	11	36	39	−3	41	
11	Hammarby IF	30	11	7	12	37	40	−3	40	
12	Jönköpings Södra IF	30	12	4	14	47	53	−6	40	
13	IFK Värnamo (O)	30	10	9	11	43	51	−8	39	Qualification to Relegation playoffs
14	IK Brage (O)	30	7	10	13	30	50	−20	31	Qualification to Relegation playoffs
15	Västerås SK (R)	30	7	7	16	39	66	−27	28	Relegation to Division 1
16	Qviding FIF (R)	30	1	8	21	17	63	−46	11	Relegation to Division 1

Source: svenskfotboll.se (in Swedish)
Rules for classification: 1) points; 2) goal difference; 3) number of goals scored.
(C) Champions; (O) Play-off winners; (P) Promoted; (R) Relegated

=== 2011 Superettan qualification play-off ===
29 October 2011
15:00

Sylvia	1–3	Brage
Nyman 54'	Report	Åkervall 10', 53'; Jevtushenko 44'

Idrottsparken, Norrköping
Attendance: 1,180
Referee: Kristoffer Karlsson (Gothenburg)
5 November 2011
15:00

Brage	4–2	Sylvia
Åkervall 10' (pen.), 50', 83'; Faltsetas 57'	Report	Roxström 75', 85'

Domnarvsvallen, Borlänge
Attendance: 2,319
Referee: Bojan Pandžić (Gothenburg)

Brage won 7–3 on aggregate.

30 October 2011
16:00

Väsby United	0–2	IFK Värnamo
	Report	Andronic 24'; Kozica 29'

Skytteholms IP, Solna
Attendance: 674
Referee: Magnus Ahlsén (Linköping)
6 November 2011
15:00

IFK Värnamo	1–0	Väsby United
Zlojutro 22'	Report

Finnvedsvallen, Värnamo
Attendance: 1,952
Referee: Andreas Ekberg (Lund)

IFK Värnamo won 3–0 on aggregate.

=== 2011 Division 1 ===
==== Norra ====
Pos	Team	Pld	W	D	L	GF	GA	GD	Pts	Promotion or relegation
1	Umeå FC (C, P)	26	15	6	5	43	27	+16	51	Promotion to Superettan
2	FC Väsby United	26	15	5	6	51	26	+25	50	Qualification to Promotion playoffs
3	IK Sirius	26	14	8	4	44	20	+24	50	
4	Dalkurd FF	26	14	7	5	51	35	+16	49	
5	BK Forward	26	9	11	6	45	37	+8	38	
6	Vasalunds IF	26	9	10	7	44	36	+8	37	
7	Karlstad BK	26	9	6	11	36	39	−3	33	
8	IK Frej	26	8	8	10	36	29	+7	32	
9	Syrianska IF Kerburan	26	9	5	12	35	51	−16	32	
10	IFK Luleå	26	7	9	10	26	38	−12	30	
11	Akropolis IF	26	7	8	11	32	36	−4	29	
12	Valsta Syrianska IK (R)	26	8	4	14	37	47	−10	28	Relegation to Division 2
13	Boden (R)	26	4	8	14	29	54	−25	20	Relegation to Division 2
14	Hammarby Talang (R)	26	5	3	18	27	61	−34	18	Relegation to Division 2

Source: svenskfotboll.se (in Swedish)
Rules for classification: 1) points; 2) goal difference; 3) number of goals scored.
(C) Champions; (P) Promoted; (R) Relegated

==== Södra ====
Pos	Team	Pld	W	D	L	GF	GA	GD	Pts	Promotion or relegation
1	Varbergs BoIS (C, P)	26	16	6	4	56	27	+29	54	Promotion to Superettan
2	IF Sylvia	26	16	1	9	54	33	+21	49	Qualification to Promotion playoffs
3	Örgryte IS	26	14	5	7	49	32	+17	47	
4	IK Oddevold	26	12	5	9	40	39	+1	41	
5	Lunds BK	26	11	6	9	35	26	+9	39	
6	Kristianstads FF	26	9	10	7	46	38	+8	37	
7	IK Sleipner	26	11	4	11	36	50	−14	37	
8	Norrby IF	26	11	2	13	39	38	+1	35	
9	FC Trollhättan	26	10	4	12	45	45	0	34	
10	IF Limhamn Bunkeflo	26	9	7	10	38	41	−3	34	
11	Skövde AIK	26	9	6	11	31	42	−11	33	
12	FC Rosengård (R)	26	7	7	12	34	40	−6	28	Relegation to Division 2
13	Husqvarna FF (R)	26	7	3	16	23	48	−25	24	Relegation to Division 2
14	Motala AIF (R)	26	5	4	17	31	58	−27	19	Relegation to Division 2

Source: svenskfotboll.se (in Swedish)
Rules for classification: 1) points; 2) goal difference; 3) number of goals scored.
(C) Champions; (P) Promoted; (R) Relegated

=== 2011 Svenska Cupen ===
==== Quarter-finals ====
15 June 2011
19:00

Kalmar FF	1 – 1 (a.e.t.)	Malmö FF
Dauda 51'	Report	Nazari 64'
Penalties
Rydström (penalty scored); Eriksson (penalty scored); Thorbjörnsson (penalty scored); Santos (penalty missed); Berisha (penalty scored)	4–3	(penalty scored) Larsson; (penalty scored) Ricardinho; (penalty missed) Durmaz; (penalty scored) Figueiredo; (penalty missed) Mutavdžić

Guldfågeln Arena, Kalmar
Attendance: 3,689
Referee: Martin Ingvarsson (Hässleholm)
15 June 2011
19:00

Åtvidabergs FF	0–3	Örebro SK
	Report	Wikström 45'; Wirtanen 88'; Staf 90'

Kopparvallen, Åtvidaberg
Attendance: 2,016
Referee: Johan Hamlin (Bro)
21 July 2011
19:00

Falkenbergs FF	2–3	IFK Göteborg
Översjö 20'; E. Johansson 21'	Report	54' Svensson; 71' Hysén; 90' Selaković

Falkenbergs IP, Falkenberg
Attendance: 3,018
Referee: Martin Ingvarsson (Hässleholm)
29 September 2011
21:00

Helsingborgs IF	2–0	IF Elfsborg
Andersson 42'; Thern 75'	Report

Olympia, Helsingborg
Attendance: 5,236
Referee: Martin Ingvarsson (Hässleholm)

==== Semi-finals ====
14 September 2011
18:30

IFK Göteborg	3 – 4 (a.e.t.)	Kalmar FF
Söder 71'; Stiller 90', 112'	Report	Israelsson 12', 102'; Nouri 32'; Carlsson 118'

Gamla Ullevi, Gothenburg
Attendance: 7,145
Referee: Martin Hansson (Holmsjö)
29 October 2011
14:00

Örebro SK	1–3	Helsingborgs IF
Paulinho 84'	Report	Santos 13'; Haginge 62' (o.g.); Bouaouzan 77'

Behrn Arena, Örebro
Attendance: 2,754
Referee: Martin Hansson (Holmsjö)

==== Final ====
5 November 2011
15:30

Helsingborgs IF	3–1	Kalmar FF
Santos 26'; Mahlangu 55'; Andersson 80' (pen.)	Report	45' Israelsson

Olympia, Helsingborg
Attendance: 9,513
Referee: Markus Strömbergsson (Gävle)

=== 2011 Supercupen ===
Final

19 March 2011
15:30 CET

Malmö FF	1–2	Helsingborg IF
Figueiredo 16'	Report	Nilsson 2'; Sundin 90'

Swedbank Stadion, Malmö
Attendance: 10,362
Referee: Markus Strömbergsson (Gävle)

== National team fixtures and results ==
19 January 2011
17:00 UTC+2
Friendly
№ 930

Botswana	1–2	Sweden
Mogorosi 47'	Report	Gerndt 31'; Svensson 74'

Cape Town Stadium, Cape Town
Attendance: 2,000
22 January 2011
17:00 UTC+2
Friendly
№ 931

South Africa Development	1–1	Sweden
Mabunda 10'	Report	Hysén 30'

Mbombela Stadium, Nelspruit
8 February 2011
19:00 UTC+2
Friendly
№ 932

Cyprus	0–2	Sweden
	Report	Hysén 26'; Berg 45'

GSP Stadium, Nicosia
Attendance: 2,000
Referee: Alexandru Tudor (Romania)
9 February 2011
20:30 UTC+2
Friendly
№ 933

Sweden	1–1	Ukraine
Elmander 7'	Report	Dević 20' (pen.)
Penalties
Granqvist (penalty scored); Källström (penalty missed); Larsson (penalty scored); Eriksson (penalty scored); Lustig (penalty scored); Bajrami (penalty missed)	4–5	(penalty missed) Kravets; (penalty scored) Tymoshchuk; (penalty scored) Aliyev; (penalty scored) Morozyuk; (penalty scored) Rotan; (penalty scored) Konoplyanka

GSP Stadium, Nicosia
Attendance: 2,000
Referee: Leontios Trattou (Cyprus)
29 March 2011
19:00 UTC+2
Euro 2012 qualification
№ 934

Sweden	2–1	Moldova
Lustig 30'; Larsson 82'	Report	Suvorov 90+2'

Råsunda, Solna
Attendance: 25,544
Referee: Knut Kircher (Germany)
3 June 2011
21:30 UTC+3
Euro 2012 qualification
№ 935

Moldova	1–4	Sweden
Bugaiov 61'	Report	Toivonen 11'; Elmander 30', 58'; Gerndt 88'

Zimbru Stadium, Chişinău
Attendance: 10,500
Referee: Andre Marriner (England)
7 June 2011
20:00 UTC+2
Euro 2012 qualification
№ 936

Sweden	5–0	Finland
Källström 11'; Ibrahimović 31', 35', 53'; Bajrami 83'	Report

Råsunda Stadium, Solna
Attendance: 32,128
Referee: Antony Gautier (France)
10 August 2011
21:00 UTC+3
Friendly
№ 937

Ukraine	0–1	Sweden
	Report	Hysén 90+2'

Metalist Stadium, Kharkiv
Referee: Paolo Tagliavento (Italy)
2 September 2011
19:45 UTC+2
Euro 2012 qualification
№ 938

Hungary	2–1	Sweden
Szabics 44'; Rudolf 90'	Report	Wilhelmsson 60'

Puskás Ferenc Stadium, Budapest
Attendance: 26,000
Referee: Damir Skomina (Slovenia)
6 September 2011
20:30 UTC+2
Euro 2012 qualification
№ 939

San Marino	0–5	Sweden
	Report	Källström 63'; Wilhelmsson 70', 90+3'; Olsson 80'; Hysén 88'

Stadio Olimpico, Serravalle
Attendance: 2,946
Referee: Steven McLean (Scotland)
7 October 2011
19:15 UTC+3
Euro 2012 qualification
№ 940

Finland	1–2	Sweden
Toivio 73'	Report	Larsson 8'; M. Olsson 52'

Olympic Stadium, Helsinki
Attendance: 23,257
Referee: Mark Clattenburg (England)
11 October 2011
20:15 UTC+2
Euro 2012 qualification
№ 941

Sweden	3–2	Netherlands
Källström 14'; S. Larsson 52' (pen.); Toivonen 53'	Report	Huntelaar 23'; Kuyt 50'

Råsunda Stadium, Solna
Attendance: 33,069
Referee: Cüneyt Çakır (Turkey)
11 November 2011
20:15 UTC+1
Friendly
№ 942

Denmark	2–0	Sweden
Bendtner 34'; Krohn-Dehli 80'	Report

Parken Stadium, Copenhagen
Attendance: 18,057
Referee: Svein Oddvar Moen (Norway)
15 November 2011
20:00 (UTC)
Friendly
№ 943

England	1–0	Sweden
Barry 23'	Report

Wembley Stadium, London
Attendance: 48,876
Referee: Pavel Kralovec (Czech Republic)

== Swedish clubs' performance in Europe ==
These are the results of the Swedish teams in European competitions during the 2011–12 season. (Swedish team score displayed first)

Team	Contest	Round	Opponent	1st leg score*	2nd leg score**	Aggregate score
Malmö FF	UEFA Champions League	Second qualifying round	(Faroe Islands) HB Tórshavn	2–0	1–1	W 3–1
Malmö FF	UEFA Champions League	Third qualifying round	(Scotland) Rangers	1–0	1–1	W 2–1
Malmö FF	UEFA Champions League	Play-off round	(Croatia) Dinamo Zagreb	1–4	2–0	L 3–4
Malmö FF	UEFA Europa League	Group stage	(Netherlands) AZ	0–0	1–4	None
Malmö FF	UEFA Europa League	Group stage	(Ukraine) Metalist Kharkiv	1–4	1–3	None
Malmö FF	UEFA Europa League	Group stage	Austria Wien	1–2	0–2	None
Helsingborgs IF	UEFA Europa League	Third qualifying round	(Israel) Bnei Yehuda	0–1	3–0	W 3–1
Helsingborgs IF	UEFA Europa League	Play-off round	(Belgium) Standard Liège	0–1	1–3	L 1–4
IF Elfsborg	UEFA Europa League	First qualifying round	(Luxembourg) Fola Esch	4–0	1–1	W 5–1
IF Elfsborg	UEFA Europa League	Second qualifying round	(Lithuania) Sūduva Marijampolė	1–1	3–0	W 4–1
IF Elfsborg	UEFA Europa League	Third qualifying round	(Norway) Aalesund	0–4	1–1	L 1–5
BK Häcken	UEFA Europa League	First qualifying round	(Luxembourg) Käerjéng 97	1–1	5–1	W 6–2
BK Häcken	UEFA Europa League	Second qualifying round	(Finland) Honka	1–0	2–0	W 3–0
BK Häcken	UEFA Europa League	Third qualifying round	(Portugal) Nacional	0–3	2–1	L 2–4
Örebro SK	UEFA Europa League	Second qualifying round	(Bosnia and Herzegovina) Sarajevo	0–0	0–2	L 0–2

* For group games in Europa League, score in home game is displayed
** For group games in Europa League, score in away game is displayed
