= 2010 Superettan =

Superettan
- Season: 2010
- Champions: Syrianska FC
- Promoted: Syrianska FC; IFK Norrköping
- Relegated: Örgryte IS; FC Trollhättan; FC Väsby United
- Matches played: 240
- Goals scored: 673 (2.8 per match)
- Top goalscorer: Linus Hallenius (18)
- Average attendance: 2,572

The 2010 Superettan was part of the 2010 Swedish football season, and the eleventh season of Superettan, Sweden's second-tier football division in its current format. The season began on 10 April 2010 and ended on 23 October 2010.

The top 2 teams qualified directly for promotion to Allsvenskan, the third played a play-off against the fourteenth from Allsvenskan to decide who qualified to play in Allsvenskan 2011. The bottom 2 teams qualified directly for relegation to Division 1, the thirteenth and the fourteenth played a play-off against the numbers two from Division 1 Södra and Division 1 Norra to decide who qualified to play in Superettan 2011.

== Participating teams ==
Location of the Superettan 2010 teams

Team	Location	Manager	Venue	Capacity	Last season
Assyriska	Södertälje	(Sweden) Rikard Norling	Södertälje Fotbollsarena	6,700	3rd
Brage	Borlänge	(Sweden) Lennart Andersson	Domnarvsvallen	6,500	2nd (D1 Norra)
Degerfors	Degerfors	(Sweden) Patrik Werner	Stora Valla	12,500	1st (D1 Norra)
Falkenberg	Falkenberg	(Sweden) Thomas Askebrand	Falkenbergs IP	4,000	6th
Hammarby	Stockholm	(Sweden) Michael Borgqvist	Söderstadion	16,187	16th (Allsvenskan 2009)
Jönköpings Södra	Jönköping	(Sweden) Andreas Jankevics	Stadsparksvallen	5,200	10th
Landskrona	Landskrona	(Sweden) Henrik Larsson	Landskrona IP	12,000	8th
Ljungskile	Ljungskile	(Sweden) Bo Wålemark (Sweden) Örjan Glans	Starke Arvid Arena	8,000	9th
Norrköping	Norrköping	(Sweden) Göran Bergort	Idrottsparken	17,234	11th
GIF Sundsvall	Sundsvall	(Sweden) Sören Åkeby	Norrporten Arena	7,700	5th
Syrianska	Södertälje	(Sweden) Özcan Melkemichel	Södertälje Fotbollsarena	6,700	4th
Trollhättan	Trollhättan	(Sweden) Lars-Olof Mattsson	Edsborgs IP	5,100	13th
Väsby	Upplands Väsby	(Sweden) Thomas Lagerlöf	Vilundavallen	2,500	12th
Ängelholm	Ängelholm	(Sweden) Roar Hansen	Ängelholms IP	5,000	7th
Örgryte	Gothenburg	(Sweden) Janne Andersson	Gamla Ullevi	19,000	15th (Allsvenskan 2009)
Öster	Växjö	(Sweden) Andreas Ottosson	Värendsvallen	13,800	1st (D1 Södra)

== League table ==
Pos	Team	Pld	W	D	L	GF	GA	GD	Pts	Promotion, qualification or relegation
1	Syrianska FC (C, P)	30	16	8	6	46	27	+19	56	Promotion to Allsvenskan
2	IFK Norrköping (P)	30	17	5	8	51	33	+18	56	Promotion to Allsvenskan
3	GIF Sundsvall	30	13	12	5	56	39	+17	51	Qualification to Promotion playoffs
4	Assyriska FF	30	13	7	10	48	42	+6	46	
5	Landskrona BoIS	30	13	6	11	40	39	+1	45	
6	Ljungskile SK	30	11	11	8	47	35	+12	44	
7	Falkenbergs FF	30	11	11	8	46	34	+12	44	
8	Hammarby IF	30	12	7	11	45	40	+5	43	
9	Örgryte IS (R)	30	9	15	6	43	35	+8	42	Relegation to Division 1 (Note: Örgryte were relegated due to their Superettan licence being revoked after bankruptcy.)
10	Degerfors IF	30	12	6	12	43	45	−2	42	
11	IK Brage	30	11	8	11	36	38	−2	41	
12	Ängelholms FF	30	9	10	11	39	39	0	37	
13	Jönköpings Södra IF (O)	30	9	9	12	40	47	−7	36	Qualification to Relegation playoffs
14	Östers IF (O)	30	8	5	17	30	54	−24	29	Qualification to Relegation playoffs
15	FC Trollhättan (R)	30	5	8	17	32	66	−34	23	Relegation to Division 1
16	FC Väsby United (R)	30	4	6	20	31	60	−29	18	Relegation to Division 1

Source: svenskfotboll.se (in Swedish)
Rules for classification: 1) points; 2) goal difference; 3) number of goals scored.
(C) Champions; (O) Play-off winners; (P) Promoted; (R) Relegated

== Results ==
Home \ Away	AFF	IKB	DIF	FFF	HAM	JSIF	LAN	LSK	IFKN	GIFS	SFC	FCT	VU	ÄFF	ÖIS	ÖIF
Assyriska FF		1–0	5–2	1–1	0–3	0–0	4–1	2–1	2–1	1–0	2–0	5–2	1–2	3–1	1–3	1–0
IK Brage	2–2		1–1	1–1	2–0	4–1	2–1	0–3	2–3	2–3	2–1	0–0	2–1	1–0	2–2	3–1
Degerfors IF	2–1	1–0		2–2	4–2	2–2	3–2	5–3	1–3	0–2	0–0	2–0	2–1	1–0	0–1	1–0
Falkenbergs FF	4–1	0–2	1–2		0–0	1–1	4–0	1–1	2–3	0–1	1–2	5–0	3–1	3–1	1–1	2–0
Hammarby IF	3–2	0–1	2–1	0–0		1–1	4–1	1–1	2–3	2–1	0–0	3–0	2–0	2–1	1–2	0–1
Jönköpings Södra IF	0–1	0–0	1–2	1–2	2–1		4–1	0–3	2–1	2–2	0–1	3–0	2–1	1–3	0–2	4–3
Landskrona BoIS	2–3	2–0	1–0	2–1	0–1	0–3		2–1	3–1	0–0	1–2	3–0	2–0	1–0	0–0	4–0
Ljungskile SK	2–0	5–1	2–0	1–0	2–2	2–0	0–0		2–1	0–0	1–1	4–2	1–0	2–2	1–1	1–2
IFK Norrköping	0–0	0–0	3–2	0–2	1–0	3–0	0–3	2–1		1–1	3–2	3–0	4–0	0–1	1–1	3–0
GIF Sundsvall	3–1	2–1	2–2	3–3	2–2	1–1	1–2	3–2	1–1		5–2	1–1	3–2	0–1	2–1	5–0
Syrianska FC	3–2	1–0	2–1	4–0	0–2	2–1	1–1	2–0	2–0	2–0		3–0	1–0	0–0	2–3	3–0
FC Trollhättan	0–0	3–3	1–0	1–1	0–2	2–2	0–2	0–1	0–4	2–3	0–2		1–0	2–1	4–2	1–2
FC Väsby United	0–3	1–0	1–2	0–1	3–1	3–4	1–1	3–2	0–2	2–4	0–3	2–2		1–1	2–2	1–3
Ängelholms FF	2–1	2–0	1–0	1–1	3–2	2–0	0–1	0–0	1–2	3–3	0–0	4–2	2–2		1–1	2–3
Örgryte IS	1–1	0–1	2–1	1–2	3–0	0–1	1–1	0–0	0–1	0–0	1–1	3–3	1–1	3–3		2–0
Östers IF	1–1	0–1	1–1	0–1	3–4	1–1	2–0	2–2	0–1	0–2	1–1	0–3	2–0	1–0	1–3	

Source: svenskfotboll.se (in Swedish)
Legend: Blue = home team win; Yellow = draw; Red = away team win.

== Relegation play-offs ==
The 13th and 14th placed teams in the 2010 Superettan, Jönköpings Södra and Öster, plays against the runners up from the 2010 Division 1, Sirius and Qviding.

Team 1	Agg.	Team 2	1st leg	2nd leg
Sirius	0–4	Jönköpings Södra	0–1	0–3
Qviding	1–4	Öster	0–2	1–2

Jönköpings Södra and Öster stayed in Superettan.

Sirius stayed in Division 1. Qviding were promoted as Örgryte went bankrupt and were demoted.

== Season statistics ==
=== Top scorers ===
Rank	Player	Club	Goals
1	(Sweden) Linus Hallenius	Hammarby	18
2	(Nigeria) Peter Ijeh	Syrianska	17
3	(Sweden) Peter Samuelsson	Degerfors	15
4	(Sweden) Pär Cederqvist	Jönköpings Södra	14
5	(Sweden) Gabriel Altemark-Vanneryr	Ljungskile	13
5	(Kosovo) Shpetim Hasani	IFK Norrköping	13
5	(Sweden) Daniel Åkervall	Brage	13
8	(Sweden) Fredrik Karlsson	Landskrona BoIS	12
9	(Sweden) Johan Eklund	Brage	11
9	(Sweden) Magnus Eriksson	Väsby United	11
9	(Sweden) Kristoffer Fagercrantz	Jönköpings Södra	11

=== Top goalkeepers ===
(Minimum of 10 games played)

Rank	Goalkeeper	Club	GP	GA	SV%	ShO
1	(Jamaica) Dwayne Miller	Syrianska	21	14	82	13
2	(Sweden) Alexander Nadj	Jönköpings Södra	21	28	80	4
2	(Bosnia and Herzegovina) Stojan Lukic	Falkenberg	30	34	80	8
4	(Sweden) Niklas Westberg	IFK Norrköping	28	31	79	11
5	(Sweden) Johannes Hopf	Hammarby	26	33	78	8
5	(Sweden) Gerhard Andersson	Brage	28	35	78	8
7	(Sweden) Peter Abrahamsson	Örgryte	30	35	77	7
8	(United States) Nick Noble	Ljungskile SK	30	35	76	12
8	(Sweden) Daniel Andersson	Ängelholm	30	39	76	8
10	(Sweden) Peter Karlsson	Landskrona BoIS	27	34	75	11

=== Attendances ===
Team	Stadium	Capacity	Total	Average	Games	% of Capacity
Assyriska	Södertälje Fotbollsarena	6,700	34,235	2,282	15	34%
Brage	Domnarvsvallen	6,500	37,544	2,503	15	39%
Degerfors	Stora Valla	12,500	38,641	2,576	15	21%
Falkenberg	Falkenbergs IP	4,000	50,550	1,370	15	34%
Hammarby	Söderstadion	16,187	102,953	6,864	15	42%
Jönköpings Södra	Stadsparksvallen	5,200	34,112	2,274	15	44%
Landskrona	Landskrona IP	12,000	46,852	3,123	15	26%
Ljungskile	Starke Arvid Arena	8,000	17,739	1,183	15	15%
Norrköping	Idrottsparken	17,234	79,611	5,307	15	31%
GIF Sundsvall	Norrporten Arena	7,700	50,377	3,358	15	44%
Syrianska	Södertälje Fotbollsarena	6,700	40,305	2,687	15	40%
Trollhättan	Edsborgs IP	5,100	23,340	1,556	15	31%
Väsby	Vilundavallen	2,500	10,849	723	15	29%
Ängelholm	Ängelholms IP	5,000	14,004	934	15	19%
Örgryte	Gamla Ullevi	19,000	33,955	2,264	15	12%
Öster	Värendsvallen	13,800	32,168	2,145	15	16%

Total	Games	Average
617,235	240	2,572

Source: svenskfotboll.se (in Swedish)
