= 2007 Superettan =

Superettan
- Season: 2007
- Champions: IFK Norrköping
- Promoted: IFK Norrköping; Ljungskile; GIF Sundsvall
- Relegated: Öster; Sylvia
- Matches played: 240

The 2007 Superettan was part of the 2007 Swedish football season, and the eighth season of Superettan, Sweden's second-tier football division in its current format. A total of 16 teams contested the league.

== Overview ==
It was contested by 16 teams, and IFK Norrköping won the tournament.

== League table ==
Pos	Team	Pld	W	D	L	GF	GA	GD	Pts	Promotion or relegation
1	IFK Norrköping (C, P)	30	20	3	7	62	29	+33	63	Promotion to Allsvenskan
2	Ljungskile SK (P)	30	17	4	9	42	35	+7	55	Promotion to Allsvenskan
3	GIF Sundsvall (P)	30	16	6	8	48	32	+16	54	Promotion to Allsvenskan
4	BK Häcken	30	17	2	11	51	30	+21	53	
5	Bunkeflo	30	14	6	10	49	49	0	48	
6	Åtvidabergs FF	30	14	5	11	44	35	+9	47	
7	IK Sirius	30	13	4	13	53	50	+3	43	
8	Degerfors IF	30	10	8	12	34	40	−6	38	
9	Mjällby AIF	30	9	9	12	39	40	−1	36	
10	Örgryte IS	30	10	6	14	40	52	−12	36	
11	Landskrona BoIS	30	9	8	13	39	45	−6	35	
12	Enköpings SK	30	9	8	13	25	38	−13	35	
13	Jönköpings Södra IF	30	9	7	14	35	47	−12	34	
14	Falkenbergs FF	30	9	7	14	35	52	−17	34	
15	Östers IF (R)	30	8	8	14	28	35	−7	32	Relegation to Division 1
16	IF Sylvia (R)	30	6	9	15	36	51	−15	27	Relegation to Division 1

Source: svenskfotboll.se (in Swedish)
Rules for classification: 1) points; 2) goal difference; 3) number of goals scored.
(C) Champions; (P) Promoted; (R) Relegated

== Season statistics ==
=== Top scorers ===
Rank	Player	Club	Goals
1	(Iceland) Garðar Gunnlaugsson	IFK Norrköping	18
2	(Sweden) Johan Patriksson	GIF Sundsvall	17
3	(Sweden) Marcus Ekenberg	Mjällby AIF	15
4	(Sweden) Andreas Kristoffersson	Ljungskile SK	14
5	(Sweden) Andreas Drugge	Degerfors IF	13
5	(Brazil) Paulinho	BK Häcken	13
5	(Sweden) Daniel Hoch	IK Sirius	13
8	(Sweden) Ken Fagerberg	Örgryte	12
9	(Sweden) Tommy Thelin	Jönköpings Södra IF	11
10	(Iceland) Stefán Þórðarson	IFK Norrköping	10
10	(Sweden) Daniel Åkervall	IF Sylvia	10
10	(Sweden) Oscar Möller	Åtvidabergs FF	10
10	(Liberia) Dioh Williams	BK Häcken	10

=== Top goalkeepers ===
(Minimum of 10 games played)

Rank	Goalkeeper	Club	GP	GA	SV%	ShO
1	(Sweden) Lee Baxter	Landskrona BoIS	12	12	84	3
2	(Albania) Nuredin Bakiu	IFK Norrköping	27	26	80	11
2	(Sweden) Nicklas Svensson	Ljungskile SK	21	19	80	7
2	(Sweden) Nicklas Bergh	Enköpings SK	18	17	80	5
5	(Sweden) Mikael Axelsson	Jönköpings Södra IF	17	25	79	4
5	(Sweden) Tommy Naurin	Falkenbergs FF	15	23	79	2
7	(Sweden) Christoffer Källqvist	Häcken	13	11	77	4
7	(Sweden) Simon Nurme	Degerfors IF	12	9	77	5
7	(Sweden) Ola Svensson	IF Limhamn Bunkeflo	25	38	77	6
10	(Sweden) Alexander Hysén	BK Häcken	18	17	75	6
10	(Sweden) Henrik Gustavsson	Åtvidabergs FF	30	39	75	7
