= 2011 Allsvenskan =

87th season of Allsvenskan

Allsvenskan
- Season: 2011
- Champions: Helsingborgs IF; 7th Allsvenskan title 5th Swedish title overall
- Relegated: Halmstads BK; Trelleborgs FF
- Champions League: Helsingborgs IF
- Europa League: AIK; Elfsborg; Kalmar FF
- Matches: 240
- Goals: 628 (2.62 per match)
- Top goalscorer: Mathias Ranégie (21)
- Biggest home win: Häcken 6–0 Mjällby (3 July 2011)
- Biggest away win: Syrianska 1–5 Häcken (17 April 2011); IFK Göteborg 0–4 Djurgårdens IF (13 June 2011); Halmstads BK 1–5 Malmö FF (21 September 2011)
- Highest scoring: Helsingborgs IF 7–3 Trelleborgs FF (23 June 2011)
- Longest winning run: 6 games AIK; Elfsborg
- Longest unbeaten run: 17 games Helsingborgs IF
- Longest winless run: 11 games Halmstads BK; IFK Norrköping
- Longest losing run: 7 games Halmstads BK
- Highest attendance: 28,931; Djurgårdens IF 0–0 AIK (4 April 2011)
- Lowest attendance: 1,510; Trelleborgs FF 0–1 Halmstads BK (27 August 2011)
- Average attendance: 7,326

The 2011 Allsvenskan, part of the 2011 Swedish football season, was the 87th season of Allsvenskan since its establishment in 1924. The preliminary 2011 fixtures were released on 15 December 2010. The season began on 2 April 2011 and ended on 23 October 2011. Malmö FF were the defending champions, having won their 16th Swedish championship and their 19th Allsvenskan title the previous season.

Helsingborgs IF won the Swedish championship this season, their 7th one, in the 27th round, nearly a month before the final round, on 25 September 2011 by Helsingborg defeating GAIS 3–1 and AIK playing a 1–1 tie against Malmö FF. This was the second year in a row that a club from Scania clinched the championship title. This was also Helsingborg's first Swedish championship of the third millennium, and the first time since 1996 that a team secured the Allsvenskan championship so early in the season.

A total of 16 teams contested the league; 14 returned from the 2010 season and two had been promoted from Superettan.

== Teams ==
A total of sixteen teams contested the league, including fourteen sides from the 2010 season and two promoted teams from the 2010 Superettan.

Åtvidaberg and Brommapojkarna were relegated at the end of the 2010 season after finishing in the bottom two places of the table. Åtvidaberg thus made its immediate return to the Superettan, and Brommapojkarna ended a two-year tenure in the Allsvenskan. They were replaced by 2010 Superettan champions Syrianska FC and runners-up IFK Norrköping. Norrköping returned after a two-year absence, while Syrianska FC made their debut at the highest level of football in Sweden.

Gefle as 14th-placed team retained their Allsvenskan spot after defeating third-placed Superettan team GIF Sundsvall 3–0 on aggregate in a relegation/promotion playoff.

=== Stadia and locations ===
Locations of the 2011 Allsvenskan teams

Team	Location	Stadium	Stadium capacity^{1}
AIK	Stockholm	Råsunda Stadium	36,800
Djurgårdens IF	Stockholm	Stockholm Stadion	14,700
Elfsborg	Borås	Borås Arena	16,899
GAIS	Gothenburg	Gamla Ullevi	18,900
Gefle	Gävle	Strömvallen	7,300
IFK Göteborg	Gothenburg	Gamla Ullevi	18,900
Halmstads BK	Halmstad	Örjans Vall	15,500
Helsingborgs IF	Helsingborg	Olympia	16,500
Häcken	Gothenburg	Rambergsvallen	6,000
Kalmar FF	Kalmar	Guldfågeln Arena	12,000
Malmö FF	Malmö	Swedbank Stadion	24,000
Mjällby	Mjällby	Strandvallen	7,500
IFK Norrköping	Norrköping	Idrottsparken	17,234
Syrianska FC	Södertälje	Södertälje Fotbollsarena	6,400
Trelleborgs FF	Trelleborg	Vångavallen	10,000
Örebro SK	Örebro	Behrn Arena	13,129

- ^{1} According to each club information page at the Swedish Football Association website for Allsvenskan.

=== Personnel and kits ===
Note: Flags indicate national team as has been defined under FIFA eligibility rules. Players and Managers may hold more than one non-FIFA nationality.

Team	Head coach^{1}	Captain	Kit manufacturer	Shirt sponsor
AIK	(Sweden) Andreas Alm	(Sweden) Daniel Tjernström	adidas	Åbro
Djurgårdens IF	(Sweden) Magnus Pehrsson (Sweden) Carlos Banda	(Sweden) Joel Riddez	adidas	ICA
Elfsborg	(Sweden) Magnus Haglund	(Sweden) Anders Svensson	Umbro	Swedbank
GAIS	(Sweden) Alexander Axén	(Sweden) Fredrik Lundgren	Puma	Swedbank; Åbro
Gefle	(Sweden) Per Olsson	(Sweden) Daniel Bernhardsson	Umbro	Sandvik
IFK Göteborg	(Sweden) Jonas Olsson	(Sweden) Adam Johansson	adidas	Prioritet Finans
Halmstads BK	(Sweden) Jens Gustafsson	(Sweden) Johnny Lundberg	Puma	ICA
Helsingborgs IF	(Sweden) Conny Karlsson (Sweden) Per-Ola Ljung^{2}	(Sweden) Pär Hansson	Puma	Resurs Bank
Häcken	(Sweden) Peter Gerhardsson	(Sweden) Jonas Henriksson	Nike	BRA Bygg
Kalmar FF	(Sweden) Nanne Bergstrand	(Sweden) Henrik Rydström	Puma	Audio Video
Malmö FF	(Sweden) Rikard Norling	(Sweden) Daniel Andersson	Puma	ICA
Mjällby	(Sweden) Peter Swärdh	(Sweden) Marcus Ekenberg	Umbro	Stål & Rör Montage; Beglast
IFK Norrköping	(Sweden) Janne Andersson	(Sweden) Mathias Florén	Puma	Holmen
Syrianska FC	(Sweden) Özcan Melkemichel (Estonia) Valeri Bondarenko^{2}	(Sweden) Ahmet Özdemirok	Nike	Telge
Trelleborgs FF	(Sweden) Tom Prahl	(Sweden) Kristian Haynes	Masita	Trelleborg
Örebro SK	(Finland) Sixten Boström	(Finland) Fredrik Nordback	Puma	Malmbergs

- ^{1} According to each club information page at the Swedish Football Association website for Allsvenskan.
- ^{2} Officially listed as head coach due to the fact that their respective coach partners are missing manager licenses.

=== Managerial changes ===
Team	Outgoing manager	Manner of departure	Date of vacancy	Table	Incoming manager	Date of appointment	Table
IFK Norrköping	(Sweden) Göran Bergort	End of contract	27 October 2010	Pre-season	(Sweden) Janne Andersson	1 December 2010	Pre-season
AIK	(Scotland) Alex Miller	Resigned	10 November 2010	Pre-season	(Sweden) Andreas Alm	16 December 2010	Pre-season
Halmstads BK	(Sweden) Lars Jacobsson	Sacked	19 November 2010	Pre-season	(Spain) Josep Clotet Ruiz	5 December 2010	Pre-season
Djurgårdens IF	(Sweden) Lennart Wass	Sacked	3 May 2011	15th	(Sweden) Magnus Pehrsson	3 May 2011	15th
Malmö FF	(Sweden) Roland Nilsson	Signed by Copenhagen	29 May 2011	4th	(Sweden) Rikard Norling	3 June 2011	4th
Halmstads BK	(Spain) Josep Clotet Ruiz	Sacked	5 July 2011	16th	(Sweden) Jens Gustafsson	5 July 2011	16th

== Abandoned matches ==
The 2011 Allsvenskan was marred by several incidents involving both pyrotechnical items and supporter violence, with two matches needing to be suspended and one match needing to be re-played. In each of the three matches, the score was 1–0 in favour of one of the teams.

=== Syrianska FC vs. AIK ===
The match between Syrianska FC and AIK on 25 April 2011 was halted after twenty minutes of play when an assistant referee was hit by fireworks and, as a result, suffered tinnitus. Syrianska FC at that time led the game 1–0. Right before the fireworks were launched, AIK's striker, Teteh Bangura, was sent off after stamping Syrianska FC goalkeeper Dwayne Miller on his foot. Several firecrackers were thrown. The Swedish Football Association (SFA) concluded that it couldn't narrow down the possible sections from which the firecrackers were thrown to the extent that a single club could be identified as responsible for all of them, but concluded that the behaviour of the AIK fans shortly after led to the suspension of the game. As a consequence, the game was awarded 3–0 in Syrianska FC's favour on 12 May 2011; AIK were fined 150,000 SEK.

=== Malmö FF vs. Helsingborgs IF ===
On 24 May 2011, a Skåne derby match at Swedbank Stadion between Malmö FF and Helsingborgs IF had to be abandoned after thirty minutes, right after Helsingborg had scored to take the lead 1–0. Helsingborg goalkeeper Pär Hansson was left injured by a firecracker thrown by a spectator from Malmö FF's standing section detonating right beside him, before being pushed by a spectator who made it onto the pitch from the same standing section. The SFA did not disqualify the theory that the man throwing the firecracker might have been the same man as the one who invaded the pitch. (The Malmö District Court later concluded that was the case.) Both Malmö FF and Canal+, the broadcaster of the match, sued the man invading the pitch for abandoning the match and television broadcasting of it. The game was awarded 3–0 in Helsingborg's favour on 17 June 2011. Malmö were given a 150,000 SEK fine, while Helsingborg were fined 25,000 SEK.

On 18 October 2011, the man who invaded the pitch was sentenced by the Malmö District Court to 120 day-fines for a total of 10,000 SEK, not only for invading the pitch but also for throwing the firecracker.

=== Malmö FF vs. Djurgårdens IF ===
Malmö FF were involved in another incident at their home arena, this time in a match against Djurgårdens IF, on 30 July 2011. Like the Syrianska–AIK and Malmö–Helsingborg matches, the Malmö–Djurgården match was abandoned, after eleven minutes, after four fireworks had been launched. At that time, Malmö FF were leading 1–0. A total of six fireworks were launched, forcing the referee to abandon the match. According to Canal+, one of the fireworks was close to hitting a photographer. There were different opinions as to where the fireworks came from: Canal+ believed that the fireworks came from the section above the Djurgården terrace while the police believed that the fireworks came from within the Djurgården section. Swedish Discipline Committee chairman Khennet Thallinger stated that they "want to preserve the due process". On 5 September 2011, the Committee decided that the game would be replayed from the first kick-off, since the possible sections where the firecrackers were thrown from could not be narrowed down to a point where the same club was responsible for all those sections. The SFA's Competition Committee decided that the rematch would be played on 15 October 2011. This forced them to delay the Malmö–Syrianska and Halmstad–Djurgården games in-between to 17 October, as all Allsvenskan teams should have at least one rest day between each game. The rematch was won by Malmö 1–0.

== League table ==
Pos	Team	Pld	W	D	L	GF	GA	GD	Pts	Qualification or relegation
1	Helsingborgs IF (C)	30	18	9	3	55	27	+28	63	Qualification to Champions League second qualifying round
2	AIK	30	18	4	8	46	27	+19	58	Qualification to Europa League second qualifying round (Note: AIK qualified for the second qualifying round of the UEFA Europa League as they received the qualifying spot reserved for the winner of 2011 Svenska Cupen, as cup winner Helsingborg were already qualified to the UEFA Champions League through winning Allsvenskan. Kalmar FF, Svenska Cupen runners-up 2011, qualified for the first qualifying round of the UEFA Europa League.)
3	IF Elfsborg	30	18	3	9	52	32	+20	57	Qualification to Europa League first qualifying round
4	Malmö FF	30	15	9	6	37	30	+7	54	
5	GAIS	30	16	3	11	47	34	+13	51	
6	BK Häcken	30	14	7	9	52	32	+20	49	
7	IFK Göteborg	30	13	6	11	42	34	+8	45	
8	Kalmar FF	30	13	5	12	39	34	+5	44	Qualification to Europa League first qualifying round
9	Gefle IF	30	10	11	9	31	39	−8	41	
10	Mjällby AIF	30	12	4	14	33	39	−6	40	
11	Djurgårdens IF	30	10	6	14	36	40	−4	36	
12	Örebro SK	30	11	3	16	36	45	−9	36	
13	IFK Norrköping	30	9	7	14	32	49	−17	34	
14	Syrianska FC (O)	30	8	4	18	27	44	−17	28	Qualification to Relegation play-offs
15	Trelleborgs FF (R)	30	7	4	19	39	64	−25	25	Relegation to Superettan
16	Halmstads BK (R)	30	3	5	22	24	58	−34	14	Relegation to Superettan

Source: svenskfotboll.se (in Swedish)
Rules for classification: 1) points; 2) goal difference; 3) number of goals scored.
(C) Champions; (O) Play-off winners; (R) Relegated

== Positions by round ==
Note: Since some matches were postponed, the positions were corrected in hindsight.

Team ╲ Round	1	2	3	4	5	6	7	8	9	10	11	12	13	14	15	16	17	18	19	20	21	22	23	24	25	26	27	28	29	30
Helsingborgs IF	4	2	2	2	1	1	1	1	1	1	1	1	1	1	1	1	1	1	1	1	1	1	1	1	1	1	1	1	1	1
AIK	8	4	8	6	6	4	7	4	6	9	7	8	8	6	5	3	3	3	3	3	3	3	3	3	3	3	2	3	2	2
IF Elfsborg	3	9	9	10	9	6	2	6	3	2	2	2	2	2	2	2	2	2	2	2	2	2	2	2	2	2	3	2	3	3
Malmö FF	1	1	1	1	3	3	4	3	2	4	8	7	5	7	6	8	6	6	5	5	6	6	5	5	6	5	6	5	4	4
BK Häcken	12	8	4	9	8	10	6	10	11	12	12	10	9	9	8	7	8	7	6	6	5	4	6	6	4	6	4	4	5	6
GAIS	16	7	5	3	4	7	9	5	8	6	5	4	7	5	7	6	4	4	4	4	4	5	4	4	5	4	5	6	6	5
IFK Göteborg	13	14	15	16	14	13	12	11	12	8	11	9	10	10	9	9	9	8	8	7	8	7	7	7	7	7	7	7	7	7
Kalmar FF	11	6	10	8	10	8	3	2	4	3	3	6	3	3	3	4	5	5	7	8	9	8	8	8	8	8	8	8	8	8
Gefle IF	6	5	3	7	7	5	8	9	5	7	6	5	4	4	4	5	7	9	9	10	10	10	10	10	9	9	9	9	9	9
Mjällby AIF	14	15	11	11	12	11	13	13	13	13	14	15	15	14	15	15	15	15	13	14	11	11	11	11	13	13	12	11	10	10
Örebro SK	5	3	7	5	5	9	10	12	9	5	4	3	6	8	10	10	11	10	10	9	7	9	9	9	10	10	10	10	11	12
Djurgårdens IF	9	11	12	13	16	16	15	14	15	15	15	14	13	11	11	11	10	11	12	12	13	13	14	13	12	11	11	12	12	11
IFK Norrköping	2	10	6	4	2	2	5	7	10	11	10	11	12	13	13	13	13	13	11	13	14	14	12	12	11	12	13	13	13	13
Syrianska FC	7	12	14	14	11	14	14	15	14	14	13	13	11	12	12	14	14	14	15	15	15	15	15	15	15	14	14	14	14	14
Trelleborgs FF	15	16	16	12	13	12	11	8	7	10	9	12	14	15	14	12	12	12	14	11	12	12	13	14	14	15	15	15	15	15
Halmstads BK	10	13	13	15	15	15	16	16	16	16	16	16	16	16	16	16	16	16	16	16	16	16	16	16	16	16	16	16	16	16

Leader
2012–13 UEFA Europa League second qualifying round
2012–13 UEFA Europa League first qualifying round
Relegation play-offs
Relegation to Superettan

Source: everysport.com

== Results ==
Home \ Away	AIK	DIF	IFE	GAI	GIF	IFKG	HBK	HIF	BKH	KFF	MFF	MAIF	IFKN	SFC	TFF	ÖSK
AIK		0–1	0–1	2–1	0–2	2–0	4–0	2–1	2–1	2–1	2–0	3–0	3–0	1–0	3–0	1–0
Djurgårdens IF	0–0		0–1	2–2	1–1	1–2	2–0	1–1	1–0	2–1	0–1	1–0	1–3	3–0	4–3	0–2
IF Elfsborg	2–2	2–1		1–3	3–0	3–2	3–2	3–2	2–1	0–0	3–0	4–0	2–1	2–1	3–0	3–0
GAIS	2–0	2–1	0–2		2–3	1–0	2–1	1–3	1–0	1–0	2–0	3–0	1–2	1–0	4–0	4–1
Gefle IF	0–3	0–0	1–0	1–3		1–0	2–1	2–0	2–2	1–1	2–0	0–0	2–0	2–1	1–2	0–1
IFK Göteborg	3–1	0–4	1–1	2–1	3–0		3–1	1–2	2–2	2–0	0–0	0–1	3–0	3–0	1–1	0–1
Halmstads BK	1–3	1–3	1–2	0–2	2–2	1–2		1–2	0–1	0–0	1–5	1–0	5–4	0–1	1–1	0–0
Helsingborgs IF	1–1	3–0	1–0	1–1	3–0	2–1	2–1		1–1	1–0	2–2	3–0	1–1	1–0	7–3	2–0
BK Häcken	3–1	2–0	2–0	2–0	0–0	3–1	3–1	1–1		1–2	1–1	6–0	2–2	4–0	1–0	1–2
Kalmar FF	1–0	3–2	2–1	2–1	0–0	0–0	1–0	1–2	2–0		1–2	0–3	5–0	2–0	3–2	4–1
Malmö FF	1–1	1–0	2–1	2–1	0–0	0–2	3–1	0–3 (Note: The match between Malmö FF and Helsingborg was awarded to Helsingborg by a score of 3–0. The original contest had to be suspended after 30 minutes and a 1–0 lead for Helsingborg when a spectator ran onto the pitch and attacked Helsingborg goalkeeper Pär Hansson after the latter had been injured by fireworks just seconds earlier.)	1–0	2–0		1–0	2–1	1–0	1–1	2–1
Mjällby AIF	0–2	3–0	2–1	1–1	5–1	0–2	2–0	0–1	1–2	1–0	1–1		0–0	3–0	0–1	2–1
IFK Norrköping	0–1	2–1	2–1	2–0	1–1	2–2	2–0	0–0	0–1	1–2	0–0	0–3		2–1	2–1	0–2
Syrianska FC	3–0 (Note: The match between Syrianska FC and AIK was awarded to Syrianska FC by a score of 3–0. The original contest had to be suspended after 20 minutes and a 1–0 lead for Syrianska FC when an assistant referee was injured by fireworks thrown from the stands.)	0–0	0–2	0–2	1–1	1–2	0–0	1–2	1–5	2–1	0–0	3–1	3–0		4–1	3–1
Trelleborgs FF	1–2	3–2	3–0	0–1	2–0	2–0	0–1	1–3	1–4	3–2	2–4	1–2	1–2	0–1		1–1
Örebro SK	1–2	1–2	0–3	3–1	2–3	0–2	1–0	1–1	4–0	1–2	1–2	0–2	2–0	1–0	4–2	

Source: Swedish Football Association (in Swedish)
Legend: Blue = home team win; Yellow = draw; Red = away team win.

== Relegation play-offs ==
27 October 2011
19:20

Ängelholm	2–1	Syrianska FC
Andersson 53'; Blomberg 79'	Report	Ijeh 50'

Ängelholms IP, Ängelholm
Attendance: 1,609
Referee: Markus Strömbergsson (Gävle)

30 October 2011
17:20

Syrianska FC	3–1	Ängelholm
Barsom 53'; Arneng 66'; Bennhage 90+2' (o.g.)	Report	Andersson 58'

Södertälje Fotbollsarena, Södertälje
Attendance: 4,273
Referee: Stefan Johannesson (Stocksund)

Syrianska FC won 4–3 on aggregate.

== Season statistics ==
Top scorers
Rank	Player	Club	Goals
1	(Sweden) Mathias Ranégie	Häcken/Malmö FF	21
2	(Sweden) Tobias Hysén	IFK Göteborg	16
3	(Sierra Leone) Teteh Bangura	AIK	15
4	(Sweden) Mervan Çelik	GAIS	14
5	(Sweden) Lasse Nilsson	Elfsborg	10
5	(Brazil) Wánderson	GAIS	10
5	(Sweden) Mikael Dahlberg	Gefle	10
8	(Sweden) Rasmus Jönsson	Helsingborgs IF	9
8	(Sweden) Marcus Ekenberg	Mjällby	9
8	(Sweden) Kristian Haynes	Trelleborgs FF	9
11	7 players		8
18	10 players		7
28	8 players		6
36	9 players		5
45	14 players		4
59	25 players		3
84	38 players		2
122	69 players		1

Top assists
Rank	Player	Club	Assists
1	(Brazil) Wánderson	GAIS	12
1	(Democratic Republic of the Congo) René Makondele	Häcken	12
3	(Finland) Daniel Sjölund	Djurgårdens IF	9
3	(Sweden) Daniel Larsson	Malmö FF	9
5	(Uganda) Martin Mutumba	AIK	8
5	(Sweden) Stefan Ishizaki	Elfsborg	8
5	(Sweden) Jonas Lantto	Gefle	8
8	(Sweden) Alexander Gerndt	Helsingborgs IF	7
9	(Nigeria) John Chibuike	Häcken	6
9	(Sweden) Stefan Selaković	IFK Göteborg	6
9	(Brazil) Daniel Mendes	Kalmar FF	6
9	(Sweden) David Löfquist	Mjällby	6
9	(Sweden) Mattias Adelstam	Trelleborgs FF	6
14	8 players		5
22	10 players		4
32	19 players		3
51	42 players		2
93	83 players		1

Hat-tricks
Player	For	Against	Result	Date
(Sweden) Mathias Ranégie	Häcken	Syrianska FC	5–1	17 April 2011
(Sweden) Mathias Ranégie	Häcken	Trelleborgs FF	4–1	18 June 2011
(Sweden) Stefan Selaković	IFK Göteborg	Syrianska FC	3–0	10 July 2011
(Sierra Leone) Teteh Bangura^{4}	AIK	Halmstads BK	4–0	11 July 2011
(Sweden) Tobias Hysén	IFK Göteborg	Halmstads BK	3–1	25 July 2011
(Nigeria) Kennedy Igboananike	Djurgården	Trelleborgs FF	4–3	11 September 2011

- ^{4} Player scored 4 goals

=== Scoring ===
- First goal of the season (time of day): Imad Khalili for IFK Norrköping against GAIS (15:15, 3 April 2011)
- First goal of the season (match minute): Peter Ijeh for Syrianska FC against Gefle (4' min, 3 April 2011)
- Widest winning margin: 6 goals – Häcken 6–0 Mjällby (3 July 2011)
- Highest scoring game: 10 goals – Helsingborgs IF 7–3 Trelleborgs FF (23 June 2011)
- Most goals scored in a match by a single team: 7 goals – Helsingborgs IF 7–3 Trelleborgs FF (23 June 2011)
- Fewest games failed to score in: 2 – Helsingborgs IF
- Most games failed to score in: 15 – Syrianska FC

=== Discipline ===
- Worst overall disciplinary record (1 pt per yellow card, 3 pts per red card): 70 – Syrianska FC (55 yellow cards, 5 red cards)
- Best overall disciplinary record: 27 – Gefle (24 yellow cards, 1 red card)
- Most yellow cards (club): 55 – Syrianska FC
- Most yellow cards (player): 11 – Ivan Ristić (Syrianska FC)
- Most red cards (club): 5 – Syrianska FC
- Most red cards (player): 2 – Bobbie Friberg da Cruz (IFK Norrköping)
- Most fouls (player): 51 – Shpëtim Hasani (IFK Norrköping)

=== Clean sheets ===
- Most clean sheets: 12 – AIK
- Fewest clean sheets: 4 – Trelleborgs FF

== Attendances ==
#	Club	Average	Highest
1	AIK	13,865	24,639
2	Malmö FF	12,318	23,612
3	Helsingborgs IF	11,203	16,530
4	IFK Göteborg	10,849	17,888
5	IF Elfsborg	10,029	15,722
6	Djurgårdens IF	8,671	28,931
7	Kalmar FF	8,094	11,852
8	IFK Norrköping	7,794	10,808
9	Örebro SK	7,358	10,654
10	GAIS	5,933	15,530
11	Gefle IF	4,286	7,098
12	Halmstads BK	4,240	6,834
13	Mjällby AIF	3,613	7,000
14	BK Häcken	3,249	7,468
15	Syrianska FC Södertälje	2,852	5,626
16	Trelleborgs FF	2,757	9,572

== See also ==
Competitions

- 2011 Svenska Cupen
- 2011 Supercupen
- 2011 Superettan

Team seasons

- 2011 Djurgårdens IF season
- 2011 Halmstads BK season
- 2011 Malmö FF season

Transfers

- List of Swedish football transfers winter 2010–2011
- List of Swedish football transfers summer 2011
- List of Swedish football transfers winter 2011–2012
