= Magnus Eriksson (footballer) =

Swedish footballer (born 1990)

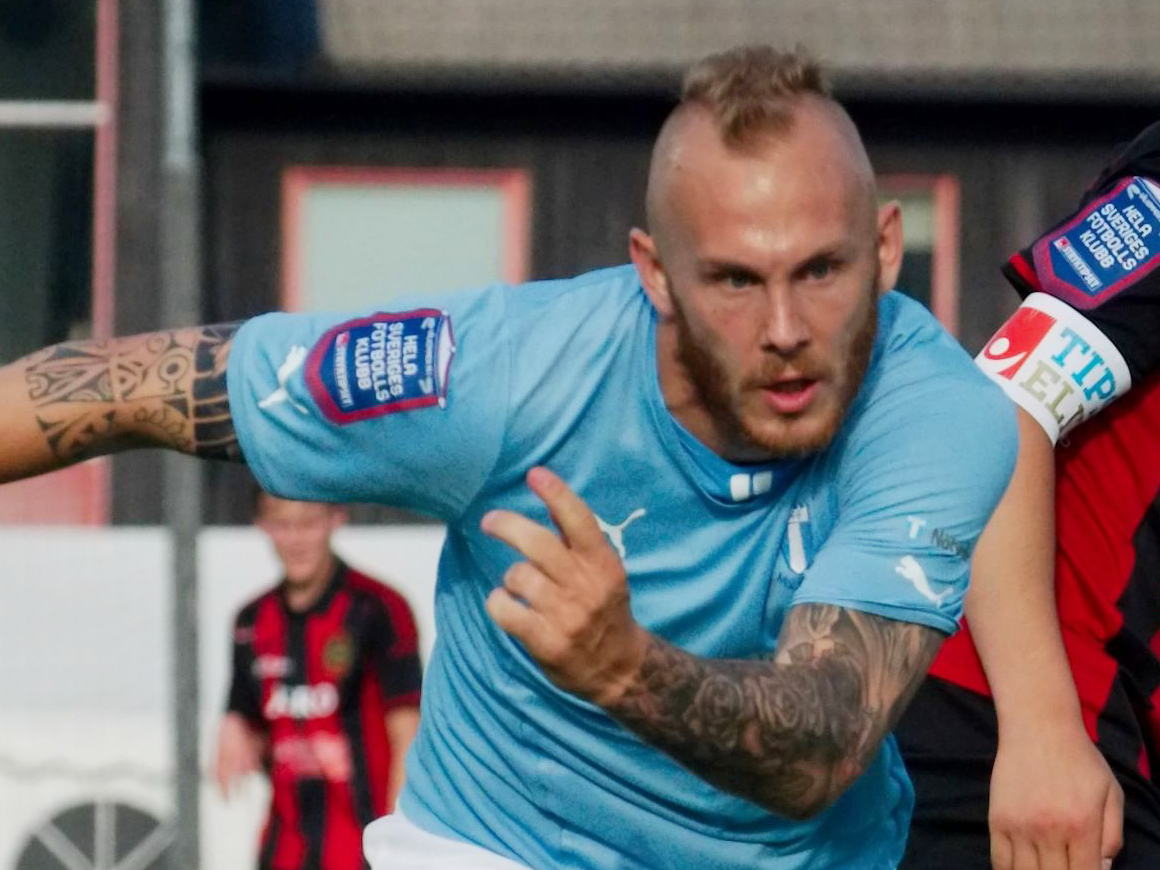
- Eriksson with Malmö FF in 2014

Personal information
- Full name: Magnus Lennart Eriksson
- Date of birth: 8 April 1990 (age 36)
- Place of birth: Solna, Sweden
- Height: 1.81 m (5 ft 11 in)
- Position: Midfielder

Youth career
- –2006: AIK

Senior career*
Years	Team	Apps	(Gls)
2006–2008	AIK	0	(0)
2008	→ Väsby United (loan)	10	(0)
2008	→ Täby IS (loan)	1	(1)
2008	→ Akropolis IF (loan)	9	(4)
2009–2010	Väsby United	48	(13)
2009	→ Täby IS (loan)	2	(1)
2009	→ Akropolis IF (loan)	4	(1)
2011–2012	Åtvidabergs FF	50	(26)
2012–2013	Gent	4	(0)
2013–2014	Malmö FF	60	(16)
2015	Guizhou Renhe	7	(0)
2015–2016	Brøndby IF	22	(1)
2016–2017	Djurgårdens IF	46	(17)
2018–2020	San Jose Earthquakes	69	(13)
2020–2025	Djurgårdens IF	118	(12)
2025	FC Stockholm	26	(2)

International career^{‡}
2005–2007	Sweden U17	10	(1)
2007–2010	Sweden U19	10	(2)
2012	Sweden U21	2	(0)
2014–2022	Sweden	4	(0)
- * Club domestic league appearances and goals as of 20 February 2026 ‡ National team caps and goals as of 20:46, 16 November 2022 (UTC)

Magnus Lennart Eriksson (born 8 April 1990) is a Swedish former professional footballer who last played as a midfielder for FC Stockholm.

== Club career ==
=== AIK ===
Eriksson started his career in the academy at AIK. He was promoted to the first team in 2006 under the management of Rikard Norling. However Eriksson never appeared competitively for the club. After two seasons in 2006 and 2007 without any league appearances Eriksson was sent on loan to two geographically close clubs Akropolis IF, then in Division 2 and FC Väsby United then in Superettan. During these two loan spells Eriksson finally acquired playing time in league football. Väsby United eventually made the loan spell permanent in 2009. Eriksson spent an additional two seasons at the club. He scored 11 goals in 29 matches for the club during the 2010 Superettan season.

=== Åtvidabergs FF ===
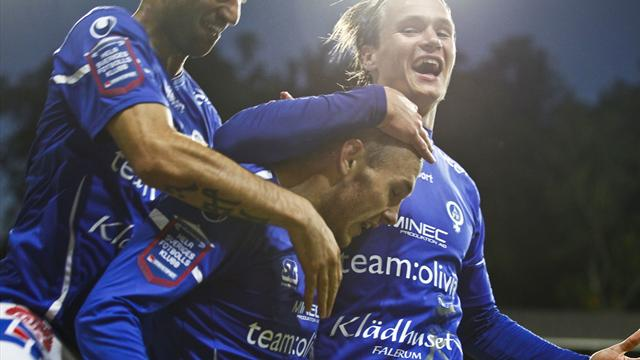
Eriksson celebrates scoring against Norrköping while playing for Åtvidaberg.

Eriksson transferred from Väsby United to fellow Superettan club Åtvidabergs FF before the 2011 Superettan season. The season proved to be a success for both Eriksson and Åtvidaberg as he scored 15 goals in 30 matches, finishing as third best goal scorer in the league and helping the club win the title and secure promotion to Allsvenskan. For the 2012 Allsvenskan season Eriksson managed to score 11 goals in 20 matches before eventually being sold to the Belgian club Gent during the 2012 summer transfer window.

=== Gent ===
On 21 August 2012, it was announced that Eriksson had transferred to K.A.A. Gent in the Belgian Pro League. He only made four league appearances for the club during the 2012–13 season. The club had three different managers during the season and Eriksson gained limited playing time.

=== Malmö FF ===
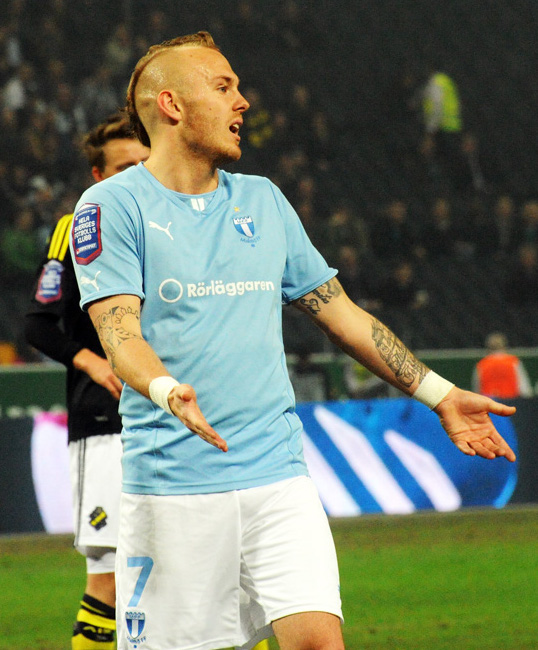
Eriksson playing for Malmö FF.

On 21 January 2013, Eriksson joined Allsvenskan club Malmö FF on a four-year contract. Eriksson acknowledged that a deciding factor in his transfer was that his former manager Rikard Norling, then manager at Malmö FF, had contacted him personally and expressed his interest in Eriksson joining the club. Eriksson enjoyed a very successful first season at Malmö FF as he became the club's top scorer and top assisting player during the 2013 season. Eriksson scored 11 goals in 30 league matches and provided the club with 14 assists which was the highest number in the 2013 Allsvenskan. He also played all matches for the club during the qualification stage for the 2013–14 UEFA Europa League and scored two goals. During the first part of the season he played together with Tokelo Rantie and then later with homecoming Guillermo Molins as Rantie was sold during the summer transfer window. For his performances during the season, he was nominated to both forward of the year and most valuable player of the year, but ultimately lost both in favour of IFK Göteborg's Tobias Hysén. In the following season Eriksson played a vital part of the team that defended the league title and qualified for the group stage of the 2014–15 UEFA Champions League. He made 30 league appearances, scoring five times. Eriksson also participated in eleven of Malmö FF's matches in the 2014–15 UEFA Champions League. He won the award for goal of the year at Fotbollsgalan for his goal against Red Bull Salzburg on 27 August 2014.

=== Guizhou Renhe ===
On 15 December 2014, the transfer of Eriksson to Chinese Super League side Guizhou Renhe was announced. The transfer went through on 1 January 2015 when the Chinese transfer window opened.

=== Brøndby IF ===
On 10 July 2015, it was announced that Eriksson had transferred to Danish club Brøndby IF on a 4-year deal. In Brøndby Eriksson was used as a right midfielder.

=== Djurgårdens IF ===
On 16 June 2016, it was announced that Eriksson had transferred to Swedish club Djurgårdens IF on a 3.5-year deal. Since number seven which is Eriksson's number of choice was taken Eriksson was given number 77, last worn by Abgar Barsom in 2006. On 14 August 2016, Eriksson scored his first goal for Djurgården in a match against IF Elfsborg at the Tele2 Arena. During his first period Eriksson was used as a winger. Ahead of 2017, Eriksson had his shirt number changed from 77 to 7. During 2017, he scored 14 league goals to make him Allsvenskan joint top scorer for the season.

=== San Jose Earthquakes ===
On 20 December 2017, the San Jose Earthquakes of MLS announced it had signed Eriksson as a Designated Player. He made his MLS debut on 3 March 2018, in San Jose's season-opening 3–2 victory over Minnesota United. Eriksson scored his first MLS goal, assisted by Danny Hoesen, in his fourth appearance, a 1–1 draw with the Philadelphia Union on 7 April 2018.

=== Return to Sweden ===
On 21 August 2020, Eriksson returned to Djurgårdens IF for an undisclosed transfer fee. Eriksson was appointed captain of team before the 2021 season, after Jesper Karlström had left for Lech Poznań. After that season, he was awarded Best Midfielder and Most Valuable Player at the league awards Allsvenskans stora pris. In the beginning of the 2022 season, Eriksson's contract was extended to the end of the 2025 season. Limited play time produced rumours for a move; in spring of 2024 media reported about interest from Allsvenskan team IFK Värnamo.

On 18 February 2025, Eriksson signed with Ettan team FC Stockholm for the 2025 season, reuniting with former coach Rikard Norling.

== International career ==
Eriksson represented the Sweden U17, U19, and U21 teams a total of 21 times before making his full Sweden debut on 17 January 2014 in a friendly game against Moldova. He made his competitive debut for Sweden in 2022 FIFA World Cup qualifier against Kosovo on 9 October 2021, replacing Kristoffer Olsson in the 90th minute of a 3–0 win.

== Career statistics ==
=== Club ===
As of 5 September 2023

Appearances and goals by club, season and competition
Club	Season	Division	League		Cup		Continental		Total	
Club	Season	Division	Apps	Goals	Apps	Goals	Apps	Goals	Apps	Goals
Akropolis IF (loan)	2008	Division 2 Södra Svealand	9	4	—		—		9	4
Täby IS (loan)	2008	Division 3 Norra Svealand	1	1	—		—		1	1
Väsby United	2008	Superettan	10	0	—		—		10	0
Väsby United	2009	Superettan	19	2	1	2	—		20	4
Väsby United	2010	Superettan	29	11	2	0	—		31	11
Väsby United	Total		58	13	3	2	—		61	15
Åtvidabergs FF	2011	Superettan	30	15	4	0	—		34	15
Åtvidabergs FF	2012	Allsvenskan	20	11	0	0	—		20	11
Åtvidabergs FF	Total		50	26	4	0	—		54	26
Gent	2012–13	Belgian Pro League	4	0	0	0	—		4	0
Malmö FF	2013	Allsvenskan	30	11	3	1	6	2	39	14
Malmö FF	2014	Allsvenskan	30	5	6	1	11	1	47	7
Malmö FF	Total		60	16	9	2	17	3	86	21
Guizhou Renhe	2015	Chinese Super League	7	0	1	0	—		8	0
Brøndby IF	2015–16	Danish Superliga	22	1	3	1	7	0	32	2
Djurgårdens IF	2016	Allsvenskan	17	3	0	0	—		17	3
Djurgårdens IF	2017	Allsvenskan	29	14	3	0	—		32	14
Djurgårdens IF	Total		46	17	3	0	0	0	49	17
San Jose Earthquakes	2018	Major League Soccer	32	6	1	0	1	0	34	6
San Jose Earthquakes	2019	Major League Soccer	32	6	2	1	0	0	34	7
San Jose Earthquakes	2020	Major League Soccer	7 (Note: Includes three appearances in the MLS is Back Tournament group stage.)	4	0	0	0	0	7	4
San Jose Earthquakes	Total		71	16	2	3	1	0	75	17
Djurgårdens IF	2020	Allsvenskan	13	3	2	1	2	0	17	4
Djurgårdens IF	2021	Allsvenskan	30	5	5	0	0	0	35	5
Djurgårdens IF	2022	Allsvenskan	29	3	6	0	14	1	49	4
Djurgårdens IF	2023	Allsvenskan	21	1	1	0	2	0	24	1
Djurgårdens IF	Total		93	12	14	1	18	1	125	14
Career total			421	106	42	10	43	4	504	117

=== International ===
As of 5 September 2023

Appearances and goals by national team and year
National team	Year	Apps	Goals
Sweden	2014	1	0
Sweden	2015	0	0
Sweden	2016	0	0
Sweden	2017	0	0
Sweden	2018	0	0
Sweden	2019	0	0
Sweden	2020	0	0
Sweden	2021	1	0
Sweden	2022	2	0
Total		4	0

== Honours ==
Åtvidabergs FF

- Superettan: 2011

Malmö FF

- Allsvenskan: 2013, 2014
- Svenska Supercupen: 2013, 2014

Individual

- Allsvenskan Midfielder of the Year: 2021
- Allsvenskan Player of the Year: 2021
- Allsvenskan top scorer: 2017 (shared with Kalle Holmberg)
- Allsvenskan top assist provider: 2013, 2021
- Årets Järnkamin: 2017, 2021
- Swedish goal of the year: 2014
