= Marcus Ekenberg =

Swedish footballer (born 1980)

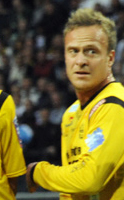

Personal information
- Full name: Ulf Marcus Daniel Ekenberg
- Date of birth: 16 June 1980 (age 46)
- Place of birth: Sweden
- Height: 1.88 m (6 ft 2 in)
- Position: Forward

Team information
- Current team: Sölvesborgs GoIF
- Number: 14

Youth career
- Mjällby AIF

Senior career*
Years	Team	Apps	(Gls)
1997–2000	Mjällby AIF	62	(22)
2000–2002	Helsingborgs IF	21	(2)
2001	→ Mjällby AIF (loan)	23	(8)
2002–2016	Mjällby AIF	354	(140)
2017–	Sölvesborgs GoIF	57	(20)
- * Club domestic league appearances and goals as of 31 December 2019

Ulf Marcus Daniel Ekenberg (born 16 June 1980) is a Swedish footballer who plays as a forward for Sölvesborgs GoIF.

== Career statistics ==
As of 3 February 2016

Club performance			League		Cup		Continental		Total	
Season	Club	League	Apps	Goals	Apps	Goals	Apps	Goals	Apps	Goals
Sweden			League		Svenska Cupen		Europe		Total	
1997	Mjällby AIF	Division 1	16	2	—		—		16	2
1998	Mjällby AIF	Division 1	15	9	—		—		15	9
1999	Mjällby AIF	Division 1	25	11	—		—		25	11
2000	Helsingborgs IF	Allsvenskan	8	1	—		—		8	1
2000	Mjällby AIF	Superettan	6	0	—		—		6	0
2001	Mjällby AIF	Superettan	21	8	—		—		21	8
2002	Helsingborgs IF	Allsvenskan	13	1	—		4	1	17	2
2002	Mjällby AIF	Superettan	8	1	—		—		8	1
2003	Mjällby AIF	Division 2	19	12	—		—		19	12
2004	Mjällby AIF	Division 2	21	13	—		—		21	13
2005	Mjällby AIF	Superettan	29	10	—		—		29	10
2006	Mjällby AIF	Superettan	27	15	—		—		27	15
2007	Mjällby AIF	Superettan	29	15	—		—		29	15
2008	Mjällby AIF	Superettan	30	17	—		—		30	19
2009	Mjällby AIF	Superettan	30	19	2	1	—		32	20
2010	Mjällby AIF	Allsvenskan	28	9	4	0	—		32	9
2011	Mjällby AIF	Allsvenskan	29	9	—		—		29	9
2012	Mjällby AIF	Allsvenskan	27	3	1	1	—		28	4
2013	Mjällby AIF	Allsvenskan	29	5	4	4	—		33	9
2014	Mjällby AIF	Allsvenskan	14	2	3	1	—		17	3
2015	Mjällby AIF	Superettan	10	1	3	1	—		13	2
Career total			434	163	17	8	4	1	455	172
