= Vadym Yevtushenko =

Ukrainian footballer (born 1958)

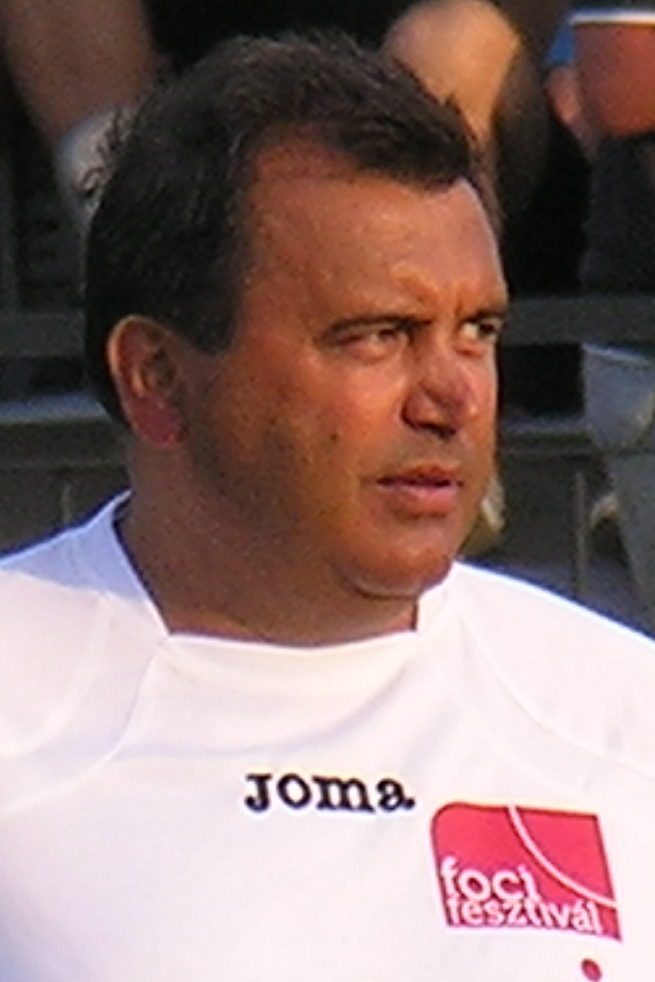

Personal information
- Full name: Vadym Anatolyovich Yevtushenko
- Date of birth: 1 January 1958 (age 68)
- Place of birth: Piatykhatky, Ukrainian SSR, USSR
- Height: 1.74 m (5 ft 9 in)
- Positions: Midfielder; striker

Senior career*
Years	Team	Apps	(Gls)
1979	Zirka Kirovohrad		(11)
1980–1987	Dynamo Kyiv	225	(59)
1988	Dnipro Dnipropetrovsk	20	(0)
1988	Dynamo Kyiv	0	(0)
1989–1993	AIK	102	(19)
1994–1995	IK Sirius	39	(9)

International career
1980–1987	USSR	12	(1)

Managerial career
- 1996: Reymersholms IK (assistant)
- 1997–1999: Hammarby IF (assistant)
- 2000: FC Järfälla (assistant)
- 2001–2008: Valsta Syrianska IK
- 2008–2009: Ukraine (assistant)
- 2011–2012: Zirka Kirovohrad
- 2012: Vorskla Poltava
- 2014–2016: Dynamo-2 Kyiv
- 2016–2017: Cherkaskyi Dnipro
- 2019–2020: Dynamo Kyiv (assistant)
- 2021: Krystal Kherson
- 2021-: FC Arlanda
- * Club domestic league appearances and goals

Vadym Anatolyovich Yevtushenko (Ukrainian: Вадим Анатолійович Євтушенко) (born 1 January 1958) is a Ukrainian professional footballer who played as a midfielder or striker.

== Career ==
During his career he played almost exclusively for Dynamo Kyiv. He earned 12 caps for the USSR national team and was included in the squads for the 1982 (he did not play in any games there) and 1986 World Cups. He scored his only goal for USSR on 26 July 1983 in a friendly against East Germany. He scored a goal as Dynamo Kyiv won the 1986 European Cup Winners' Cup Final.

In the late 1980s Yevtushenko moved to Sweden and became Swedish champion with AIK in 1992. After concluding his playing career in Sweden at IK Sirius two years later, he remained in Swedish football as first an assistant and then head coach for longer than a decade before moving back to Ukrainian football after 2008.

== Personal life ==
His son, Vyacheslav Yevtushenko played for AIK in early 2000s.

Another son Vadim Jevtusheenko played for Vasalund IF.

== Honours ==
Dynamo Kyiv

- Soviet Top League: 1980, 1981, 1985, 1986
- Soviet Cup: 1982, 1985, 1987
- European Cup Winners Cup: 1985–86

Dnipro Dnipropetrovsk

- Soviet Top League: 1988
- Soviet Cup: 1989

AIK 102

- Swedish League: 1992
