= Peter Ijeh =

Nigerian footballer (born 1977)

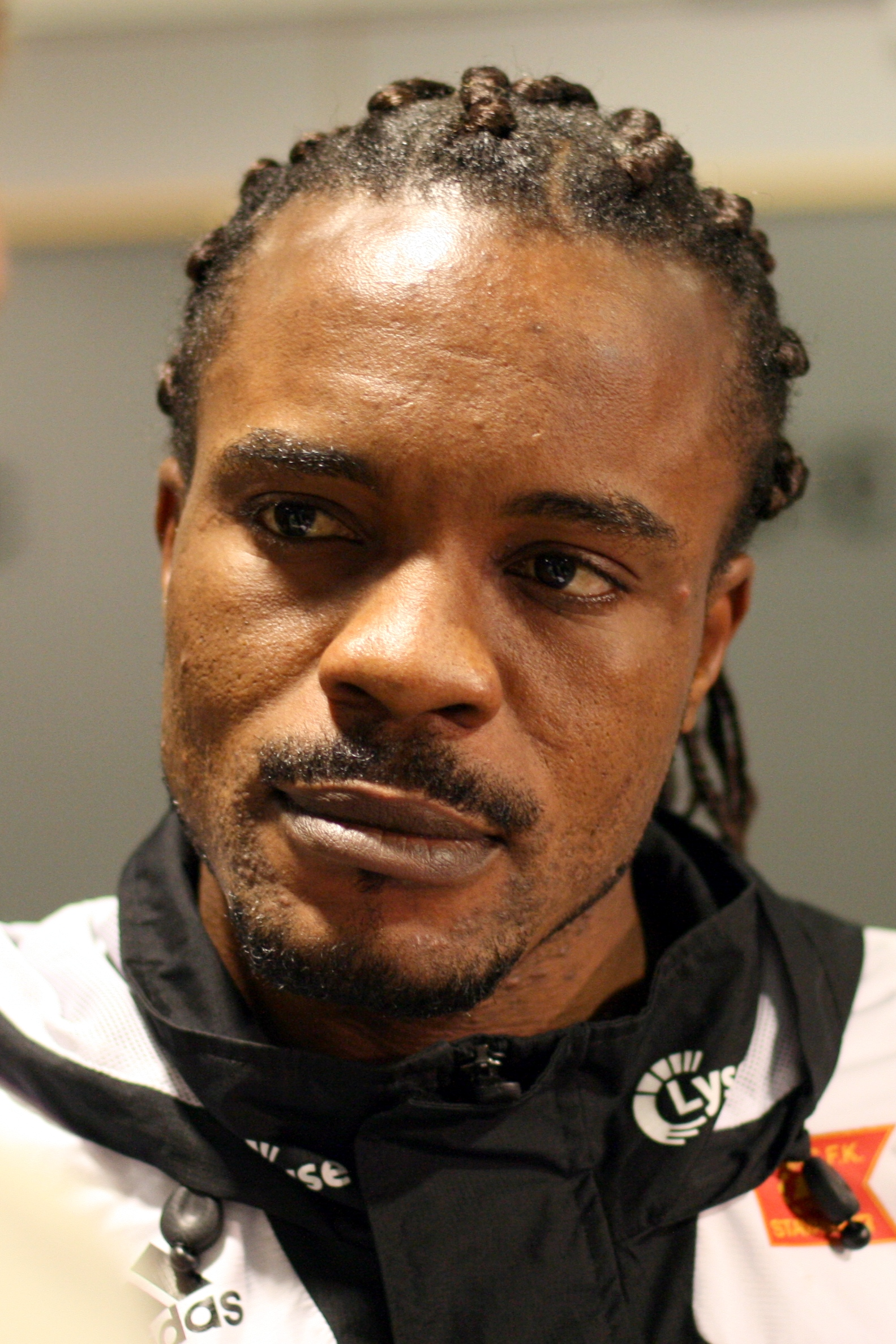
- Ijeh in 2009

Personal information
- Full name: Peter Ijeh
- Date of birth: 28 March 1977 (age 49)
- Place of birth: Lagos, Nigeria
- Height: 1.86 m (6 ft 1 in)
- Position: Forward

Senior career*
Years	Team	Apps	(Gls)
1999	NiTel United Lagos	6	(0)
2000–2001	Julius Berger FC	27	(10)
2001–2003	Malmö	60	(38)
2004–2005	IFK Göteborg	36	(14)
2005–2006	Copenhagen	16	(4)
2006–2009	Viking	78	(39)
2010–2011	Syrianska	46	(22)
2012	GAIS	18	(2)

International career
2002	Nigeria	5	(0)
- * Club domestic league appearances and goals

Peter Ijeh (born 28 March 1977) is a Nigerian former professional footballer who played as a forward.

== Career ==
=== Early career ===
After playing for clubs like NiTel United Lagos and won the highest goal scorer award with Julius Berger FC in the Nigerian Premier League, he joined Swedish club Malmö FF in 2001. He was the top scorer in Allsvenskan in 2002 with 24 goals. In 2003, he suffered a leg injury that kept him out of most of the season, but he still managed to come back strongly and finished with 10 goals.

In late 2003, he transferred to IFK Göteborg on a free transfer in a highly controversial affair as the club's big name signing for its 100th anniversary and Göteborg finished third.

In 2005 Ijeh moved to Danish club FC Copenhagen and won the league title in 2005–06 season.

=== Viking ===
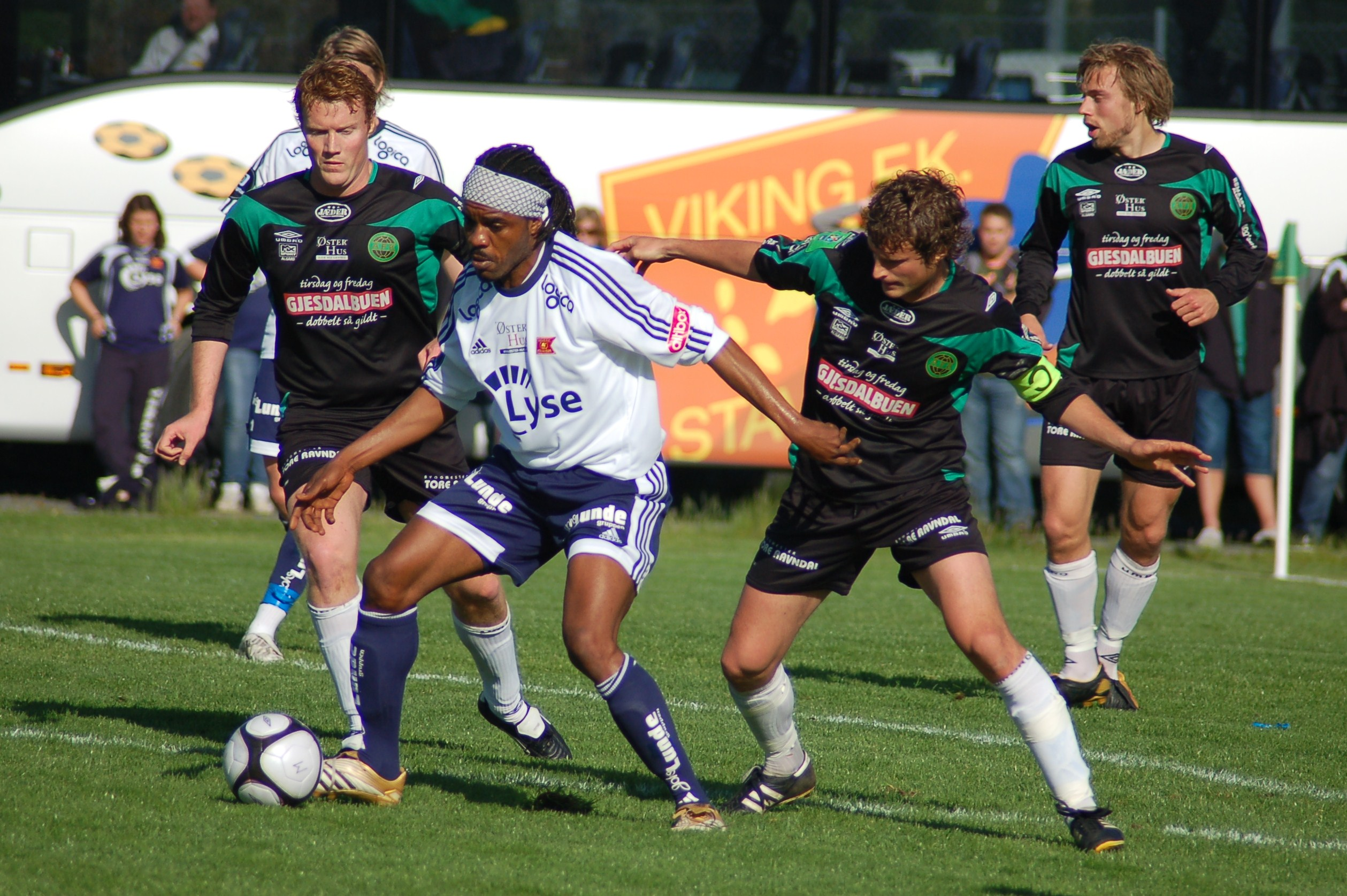
Peter Ijeh in action for Viking FK

On 19 June 2006, Ijeh moved to Viking FK in Norway on a 3 million Danish krone deal. He became an instant success, scoring 11 goals in 15 games to save the team from relegation. In the last game of the 2006 season Ijeh scored 4 goals and pressured an opposition defender to concede an own goal as Viking surprisingly demolished local rivals and second-placed S.K. Brann 5–0 to climb two places in the table and thus escape relegation on goal difference.

In early January 2007, several sources within Norwegian football claimed that Ijeh would soon be looking for another club, with English Championship side Coventry City courting the Nigerian striker, who was thought to be keen to test his skills in the more physical English game. Coventry City manager Micky Adams was thought to have watched the player on a recent scouting trip to Norway.

Oslo-based club Lyn Fotball reportedly made a NOK 12 million bid for Ijeh's services, though this was rejected from Viking. Ijeh left Viking at the end of the 2009 season to sign for Syrianska FC in the Swedish second division.

=== Syrianska FC ===
On 23 October Ijeh scored two goals in the game that took Syrianska to Allsvenskan for the first time ever. He finished the season with 17 goals. He also scored Syrianska FC's first Allsvenskan goal, after a mistake by the Gefle IF defence allowed him to roll the ball into an empty net.

=== GAIS ===
After two seasons in Syrianska, Ijeh left the club for Allsvenskan rivals GAIS where he took over the number nine shirt.

== Post-playing career ==
Ijeh studied at Gothenburg University and the Swedish Football Federation (SvFF) and acquired a UEFA advanced licensed certificate. He is also a technical and tactical soccer coach.

Ijeh took over Assyriska BK in November 2013 as a head coach.

On 10 November 2020, it was announced that Ijeh would take over as manager for Division 2 club Vårgårda IK in Västergötland, Sweden.

On 7 June 2022, the club announced that Ijeh would leave his post as manager.

== Personal life ==
Ijeh is a member of the Norwegian Christian sports organization Kristen Idrettskontakt (KRIK). His daughter is Evelyn Ijeh, a professional soccer player with the National Women's Soccer League club North Carolina Courage.

== Career statistics ==
Appearances and goals by club, season and competition
Club	Season	League			Cup		Total	
Club	Season	DIvision	Apps	Goals	Apps	Goals	Apps	Goals
Malmö FF	2001	Allsvenskan	20	4	0	0	20	4
Malmö FF	2002	Allsvenskan	23	24	0	0	23	24
Malmö FF	2003	Allsvenskan	17	10	0	0	17	10
IFK Göteborg	2004	Allsvenskan	24	11	0	0	24	11
IFK Göteborg	2005	Allsvenskan	12	3	0	0	12	3
F.C. Copenhagen	2005–06	Danish Superliga	16	4	0	0	16	4
Viking	2006	Tippeligaen	15	11	3	5	18	16
Viking	2007	Tippeligaen	23	18	2	0	25	18
Viking	2008	Tippeligaen	14	1	1	1	15	2
Viking	2009	Tippeligaen	26	9	3	5	29	14
Syrianska FC	2010	Superettan	27	17	0	0	27	17
Syrianska FC	2011	Allsvenskan	19	5	0	0	19	5
GAIS	2012	Allsvenskan	18	2	0	0	18	2
Career total			254	119	9	11	263	130
