= Peter Samuelsson =

Swedish footballer

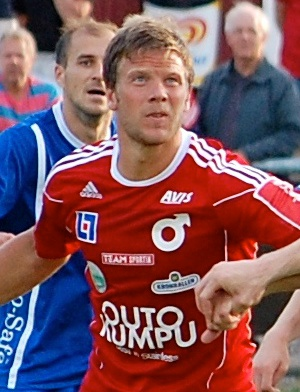

Personal information
- Date of birth: 20 November 1981 (age 44)
- Place of birth: Degerfors, Sweden
- Height: 1.81 m (5 ft 11 in)
- Position: Forward

Youth career
- Degerfors IF
- Kanada BK

Senior career*
Years	Team	Apps	(Gls)
1999–2003	Strömtorps IK		
2004–2005	Degerfors IF	22	(4)
2005	→ Brumunddal (loan)	10	(10)
2006	Nybergsund IL-Trysil	24	(23)
2007–2008	Kongsvinger IL	58	(19)
2009–2011	Degerfors IF	82	(49)
2012–2013	Örebro SK	25	(3)
2012	→ Degerfors IF (loan)	12	(9)
2014–2016	Degerfors IF	87	(33)
- * Club domestic league appearances and goals

Peter Samuelsson (born 20 November 1981) is a Swedish former footballer who played as a forward.
