= Patrik Werner =

Swedish footballer and manager

Personal information
- Full name: Patrik Werner
- Date of birth: 16 March 1976 (age 50)
- Place of birth: Sweden
- Position: Forward

Team information
- Current team: Degerfors IF (director of football)

Youth career
- 1981–1994: Degerfors IF

Senior career*
Years	Team	Apps	(Gls)
1995–1996	Degerfors IF	3	(1)
1996	Husqvarna FF	3	(0)
1997	KB Karlskoga		
1998	Karlslunds IF		
1999–2001	KB Karlskoga		
2002	Carlstad United		

Managerial career
- 2003–2008: Degerfors IF (youth)
- 2008–: Degerfors IF (director of football)
- 2009–2016: Degerfors IF
- * Club domestic league appearances and goals

Patrik Werner (born 16 March 1976) is a Swedish football manager and former player. He works at Degerfors IF as the director of football.
