= Johan Patriksson =

Swedish footballer

Personal information
- Full name: Johan Lars Daniel Patriksson
- Date of birth: May 28, 1982 (age 44)
- Place of birth: Uddevalla, Sweden
- Height: 1.74 m (5 ft 9 in)
- Position: Forward

Team information
- Current team: IK Oddevold
- Number: 8

Youth career
- IK Svane

Senior career*
Years	Team	Apps	(Gls)
2001	IK Oddevold	24	(3)
2002	Ljungskile SK	21	(12)
2003–2004	BK Häcken	6	(0)
2004	→ IK Oddevold (loan)	13	(12)
2005	Ljungskile SK	27	(11)
2006–2008	GIF Sundsvall	81	(21)
2009–2011	Ljungskile SK	78	(28)
2012–	IK Oddevold	89	(52)
- * Club domestic league appearances and goals as of 29 August 2016

Johan Lars Daniel Patriksson (born 28 May 1982) is a Swedish footballer playing for IK Oddevold as a forward.

He started his career for IK Svane and has later played professionally for IK Oddevold, BK Häcken, Ljungskile SK and GIF Sundsvall.
