= Göran Bergort =

Swedish footballer and manager

Personal information
- Date of birth: 14 February 1968 (age 58)
- Place of birth: Sweden
- Height: 1.82 m (6 ft 0 in)

Senior career*
Years	Team	Apps	(Gls)
1985–1987	Falu BS	46	(14)
1988–1990	IK Brage	53	(11)
1991–1996	IFK Norrköping	129	(6)
1997–1998	Bryne	29	(4)
1999–2000	IF Sylvia	40	(9)
2001–2004	IK Brage	97	(9)
Total		394	(53)

Managerial career
- IK Brage
- Falu BS
- 2009–2010: IFK Norrköping
- * Club domestic league appearances and goals

Göran Bergort (born 14 February 1968) is a Swedish football manager and former player. He left IFK Norrköping when his contract ran out and was not renewed after the 2010 season.

During his playing career, Bergort played in Allsvenskan with IK Brage and IFK Norrköping and later in the Norwegian First Division with Bryne and IF Sylvia in Superettan before he ended his career in IK Brage.
