= Henrik Gustavsson =

Swedish footballer

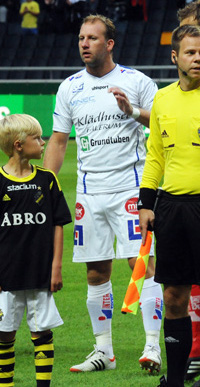

Personal information
- Full name: Lars Henrik Gustavsson
- Date of birth: 21 October 1976 (age 50)
- Place of birth: Sweden
- Height: 1.81 m (5 ft 11 in)
- Position: Goalkeeper

Youth career
- –1993: Sturefors IF
- 1994–1996: Hjulsbro IK

Senior career*
Years	Team	Apps	(Gls)
1997–2015	Åtvidabergs FF	487	(0)
2016	Horn/Hycklinge IF		
2016	Åtvidabergs FF	1	(0)
- * Club domestic league appearances and goals as of 26 September 2016

Lars Henrik Gustavsson (born 21 October 1976) is a Swedish former footballer who played as a goalkeeper, most notably for Åtvidabergs FF.
