= Skarsjövallen =

Football stadium in Ljungskile, Sweden

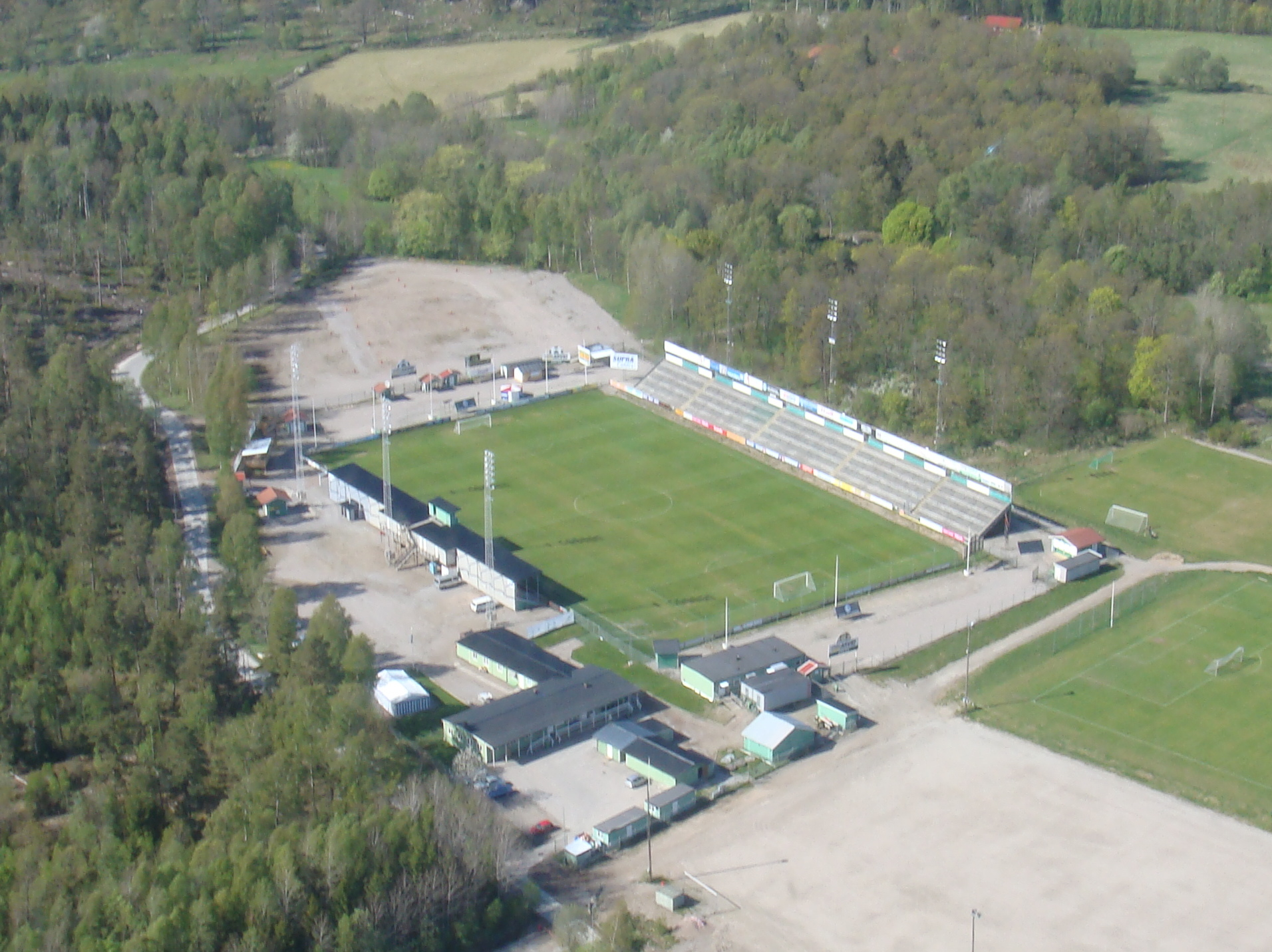
- Interactive map of Skarsjövallen
- Full name: Uddevalla Arena
- Former names: Skarsjövallen (1984–2005, 2013–15); HA Bygg Arena (2006–07, 2011); Starke Arvid (2008–11); Markbygg Arena (2011–13)
- Location: Ljungskile, Sweden
- Coordinates: 58°13′0″N 11°56′38″E
- Capacity: 8,000

Construction
- Opened: 1984

Tenant
- Ljungskile SK

Skarsjövallen, because of sponsorship reasons formerly known as Markbygg Arena, HA Bygg Arena, Starke Arvid and Uddevalla Arena, is a football stadium in Ljungskile, Sweden. The stadium holds 6,000 people, but the capacity can quickly be expanded to 8,000, if needed. It is the home stadium of Ljungskile SK.

Skarsjövallen was inaugurated in 1984. When Ljungskile reached the Swedish top-tier Allsvenskan in 1996, the stadium was brought to standard with parts from newly-renovated Olympia in Helsingborg. After having changed names eight times between 2006 and 2017 for sponsorship reasons, the stadium name returned to the original Skarsjövallen in 2017. It had been named HA Bygg Arena 2006–2007, Starke Arvid Arena 2008–2010, Markbygg Arena 2011–2012, and Uddevalla Arena from 2015.
