= Tommy Naurin =

Swedish footballer

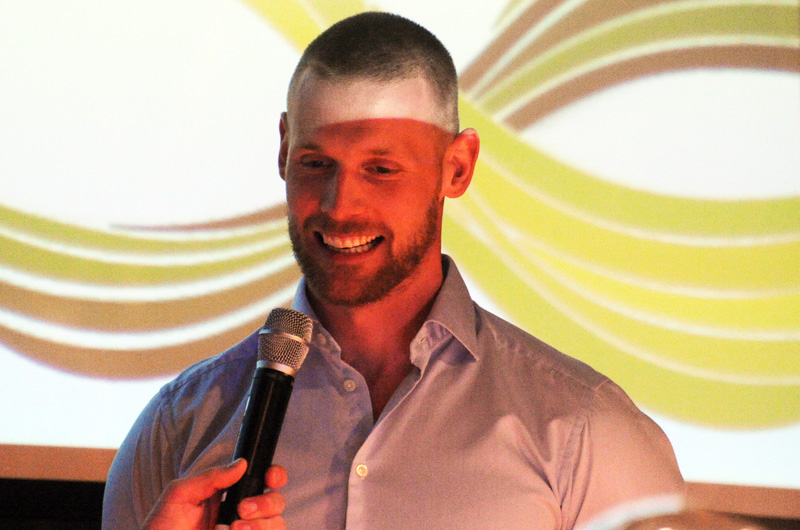

Personal information
- Full name: Tommy Peter Naurin
- Date of birth: 17 May 1984 (age 42)
- Place of birth: Hisingen, Sweden
- Height: 1.87 m (6 ft 2 in)
- Position: Goalkeeper

Youth career
- Lundby IF

Senior career*
Years	Team	Apps	(Gls)
2002–2004	Örgryte IS	6	(0)
2005–2007	Falkenbergs FF	75	(0)
2008–2009	Qviding FIF	54	(0)
2010–2018	GIF Sundsvall	185	(0)
Total		320	(0)

International career
1999	Sweden U16	1	(0)
2003	Sweden U19	1	(0)
- * Club domestic league appearances and goals

Tommy Naurin (born 17 May 1984) is a Swedish former professional footballer who played as a goalkeeper. He is currently the assistant and goalkeeping coach at GIF Sundsvall, working alongside manager Henrik Åhnstrand.

== Career ==
On 23 September 2018, it was announced that Naurin was forced to retire from professional football due to a knee injury. In total, he made 94 appearances in Allsvenskan for GIF Sundsvall and Örgryte IS.

After his playing career, he remained in GIF Sundsvall's marketing organisation and as a player coordinator.

In the autumn of 2019, he stepped in as goalkeepers coach and in 2020 he also became assistant coach.
