= Vlado Zlojutro =

Swedish footballer

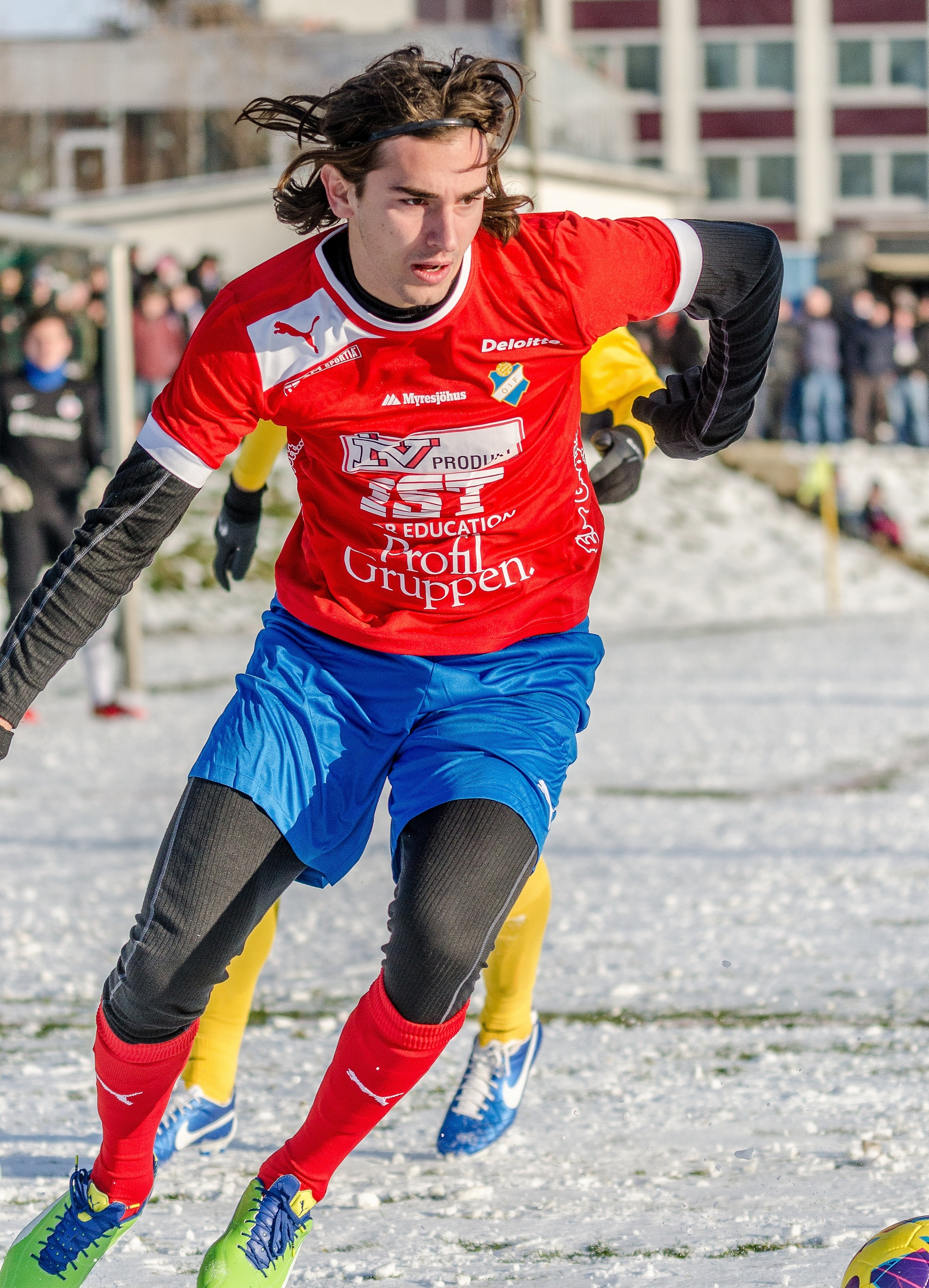

Personal information
- Full name: Vladica Zlojutro
- Date of birth: 4 January 1988 (age 38)
- Place of birth: Sweden
- Height: 1.88 m (6 ft 2 in)
- Position: Midfielder

Team information
- Current team: Vejby IF
- Number: 21

Youth career
- Gislaveds IS

Senior career*
Years	Team	Apps	(Gls)
2007	Grimsås IF		
2008–2009	Husqvarna FF	37	(9)
2009–2010	Hammarby IF	16	(1)
2009–2010	→ Ontinyent CF (loan)		
2011–2012	IFK Värnamo	40	(12)
2013–2014	Östers IF	34	(6)
2014	Varbergs BoIS	15	(1)
2015–2017	Ängelholms FF	77	(10)
2018–2019	Hittarps IK	41	(7)
2020–	Vejby IF	10	(6)
- * Club domestic league appearances and goals as of 15:27, 27 October 2020 (UTC)

Vlado Zlojutro (born 4 January 1988) is a Swedish footballer who plays for Vejby IF.

He previously played for Östers IF where he transferred in December 2012 after playing for two years as a midfielder for IFK Värnamo.
