= Finnvedsvallen =

Sports stadium in Värnamo, Sweden

Coordinates: 57°11′45.30″N 14°02′34.10″E

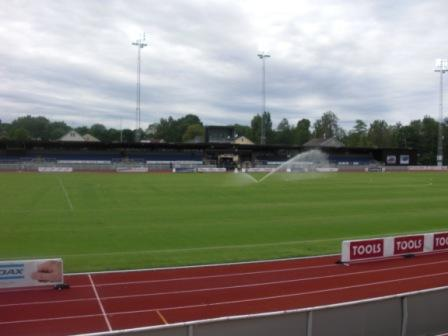
- Finnvedsvallen
- Interactive map of Finnvedsvallen
- Address: Värnamo; Sweden
- Capacity: 5,000
- Type: sports ground

Construction
- Opened: 1935

Tenant
- IFK Värnamo

Finnvedsvallen is a football stadium in Värnamo, Sweden and the home stadium for the football team IFK Värnamo. Finnvedsvallen was inaugurated in 1935, and has a total capacity of 5,000 spectators.
