= Vyacheslav Jevtushenko =

Swedish footballer (born 1981)

Personal information
- Date of birth: 26 July 1981 (age 45)
- Place of birth: Kyiv, Ukrainian SSR, Soviet Union
- Height: 1.73 m (5 ft 8 in)
- Position: Midfielder

Youth career
- 1987–: Dynamo Kyiv
- –2000: AIK

Senior career*
| Years | Team | Apps | (Gls) |
| 2001–2002 | AIK | 9 | (0) |
| 2003–2009 | Valsta Syrianska IK | 70 | (13) |
| 2010–2012 | IK Brage | 71 | (3) |
| Total | | 149 | (16) |
- * Club domestic league appearances and goals

Vyacheslav Jevtushenko (born 26 July 1981) is a Swedish former professional footballer who played as a midfielder. Following his retirement from playing, he worked as a coach.

Beside Swedish citizenship, he has a Ukrainian as well.

He is a son of the Soviet player Vadym Yevtushenko.
