= Domnarvsvallen =

Football stadium in Borlänge, Sweden

Coordinates: 60°29′42″N 15°26′2″E

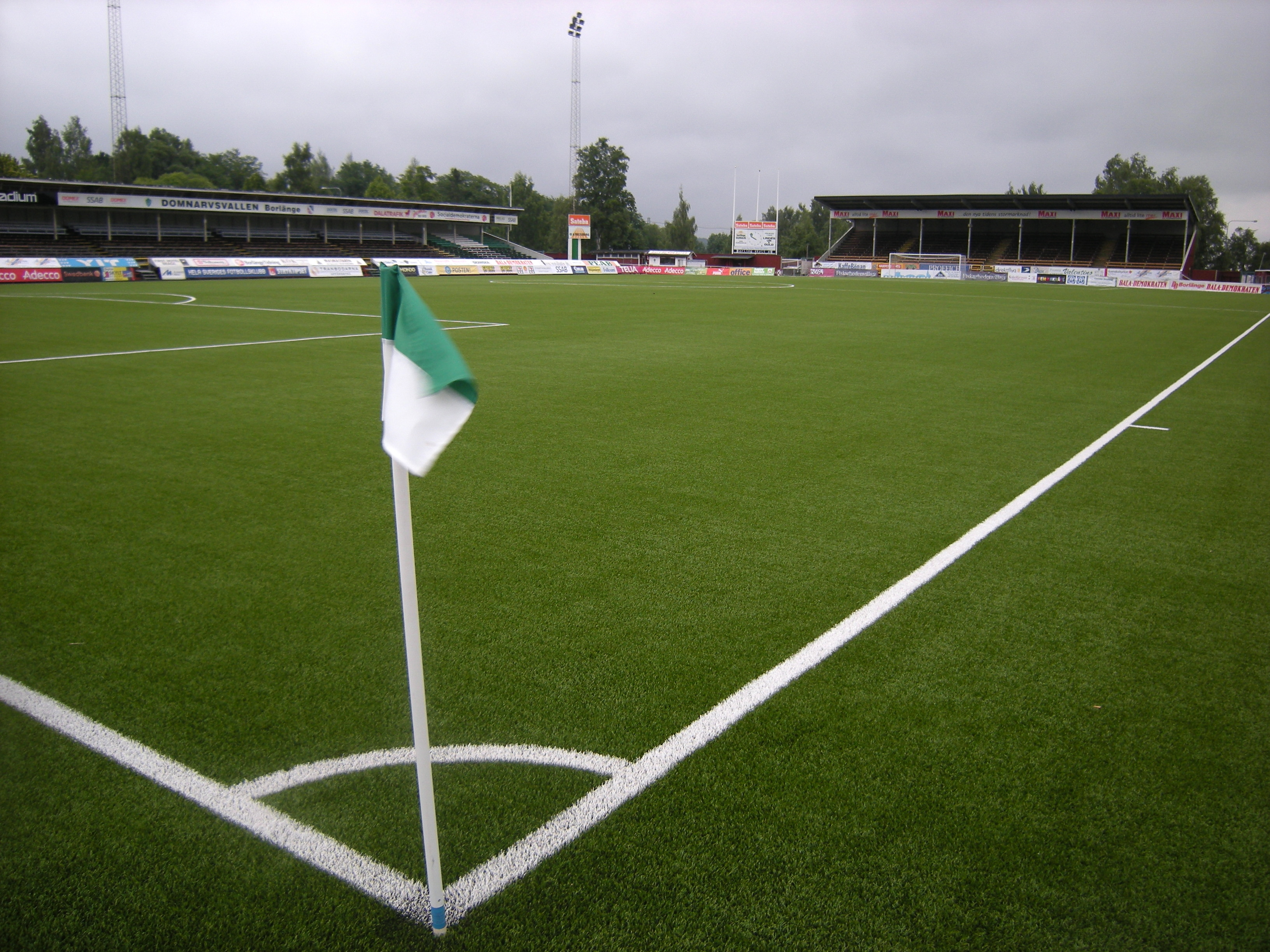
- Interactive map of Domnarvsvallen
- Location: Domnarvsvallen, 784 44, Borlänge
- Owner: Borlänge Municipality
- Operator: AB Domnarvsvallen
- Capacity: 6,500
- Surface: Artificial turf
- Record attendance: 14,200
- Field size: 105 x 68 m

Construction
- Built: 1923
- Opened: 1925

Tenant
- IK Brage (1925-)

Domnarvsvallen is a football stadium in Borlänge Municipality and the home arena for IK Brage and Dalkurd FF. Domnarvsvallen has a total capacity of 6,500 spectators.

The arena is mostly in wood, and was built in 1925 when IK Brage was founded.
