= Falkenbergs IP =

Sports ground in Falkenberg, Sweden

Coordinates: 56.89776°N 12.508275°E

- Interactive map of Falkenbergs IP
- Former names: Föreningen Falkenbergs Idrottsplats (1921–1959)
- Location: Falkenberg, Sweden
- Type: sports ground

Construction
- Opened: 1921

Tenants
- Falkenbergs FF (until 2016), IF Böljan (until 2016), Rinia IF, Falkenbergs IK

Falkenbergs IP is a football stadium in Falkenberg, and the former home arena for Falkenbergs FF. Falkenbergs IP has a total capacity of 5,500 spectators.
