= Daniel Åkervall =

Swedish footballer

Personal information
- Date of birth: 23 May 1982 (age 44)
- Place of birth: Sweden
- Height: 1.86 m (6 ft 1 in)
- Position: Midfielder

Team information
- Current team: IK Brage
- Number: 10

Youth career
- Östertälje IK

Senior career*
Years	Team	Apps	(Gls)
2002–2005	IK Sleipner		
2006–2007	IF Sylvia	24	(10)
2008–2009	Ljungskile SK	39	(5)
2010–	IK Brage	57	(19)
- * Club domestic league appearances and goals as of 23 November 2013

Daniel Åkervall (born 23 May 1982) is a Swedish footballer who plays for IK Brage as a midfielder.
