= Ängelholms IP =

Sports ground in Ängelholm, Sweden

- Änglavallen
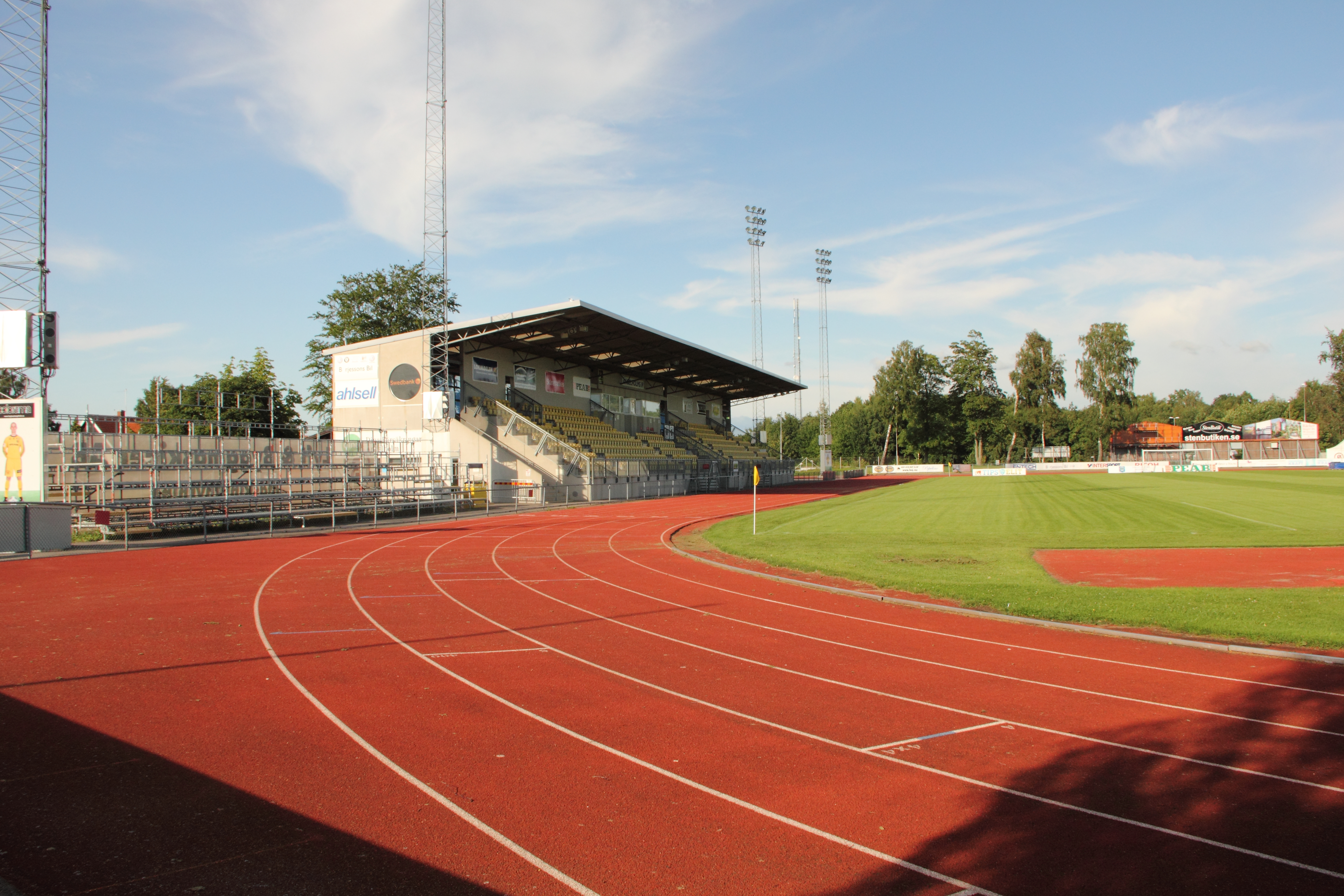
- Ängelholms in July 2011
- Interactive map of Ängelholms IP
- Location: Ängelholm, Sweden
- Coordinates: 56°14′4″N 12°51′23″E
- Capacity: 5,000 spectators
- Field size: 105 x 65 m

Construction
- Opened: 9 September 1925; 100 years ago
- Renovated: 2005

Tenant
- Ängelholms FF

Ängelholms IP, sometimes also referred to as Änglavallen, is a football and athletics stadium in Ängelholm, Sweden, and the home arena for Ängelholms FF. It was inaugurated on 9 September 1925.

Ängelholms IP has a total capacity of 5,000 spectators.

== Image gallery ==
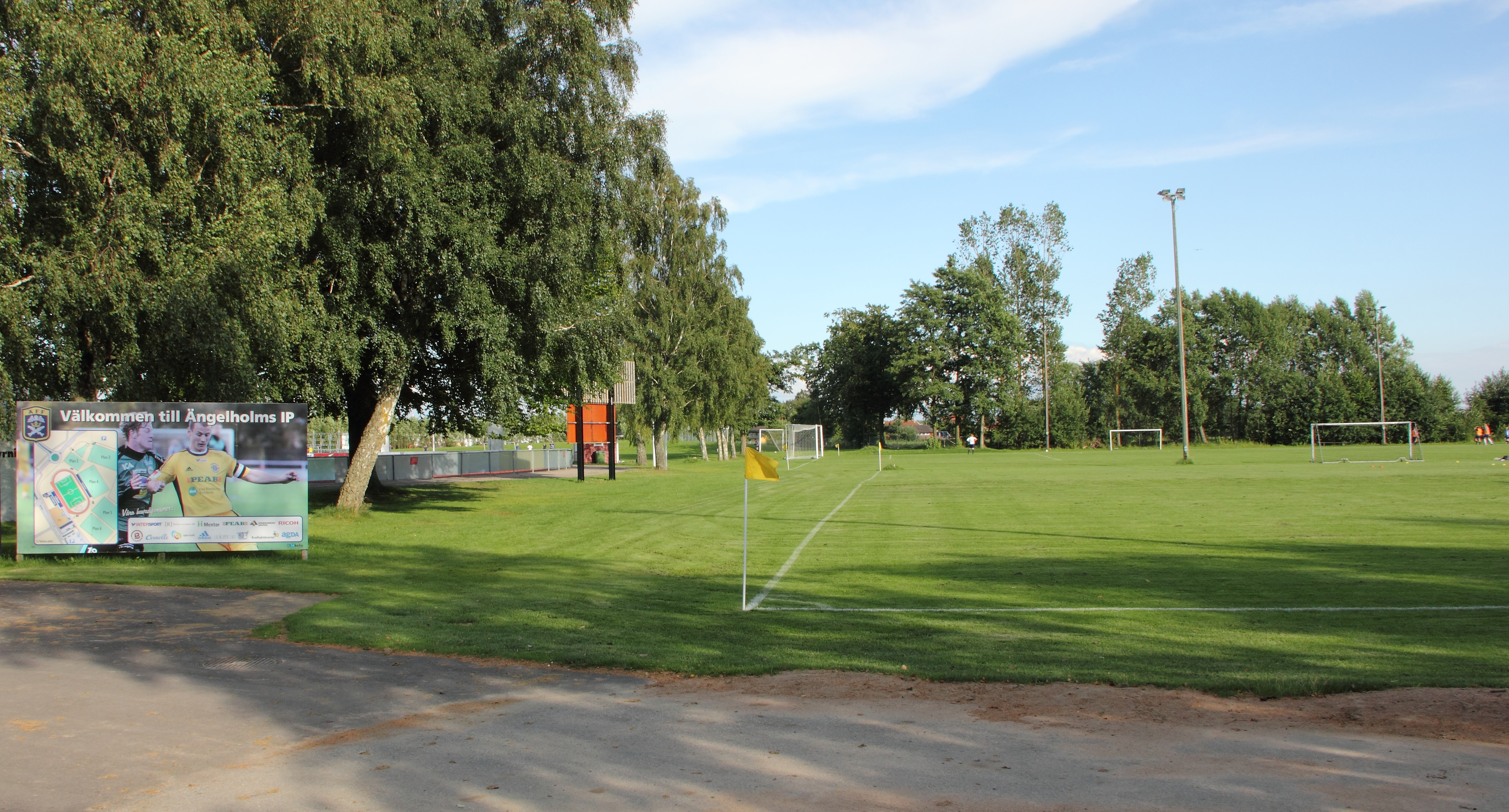

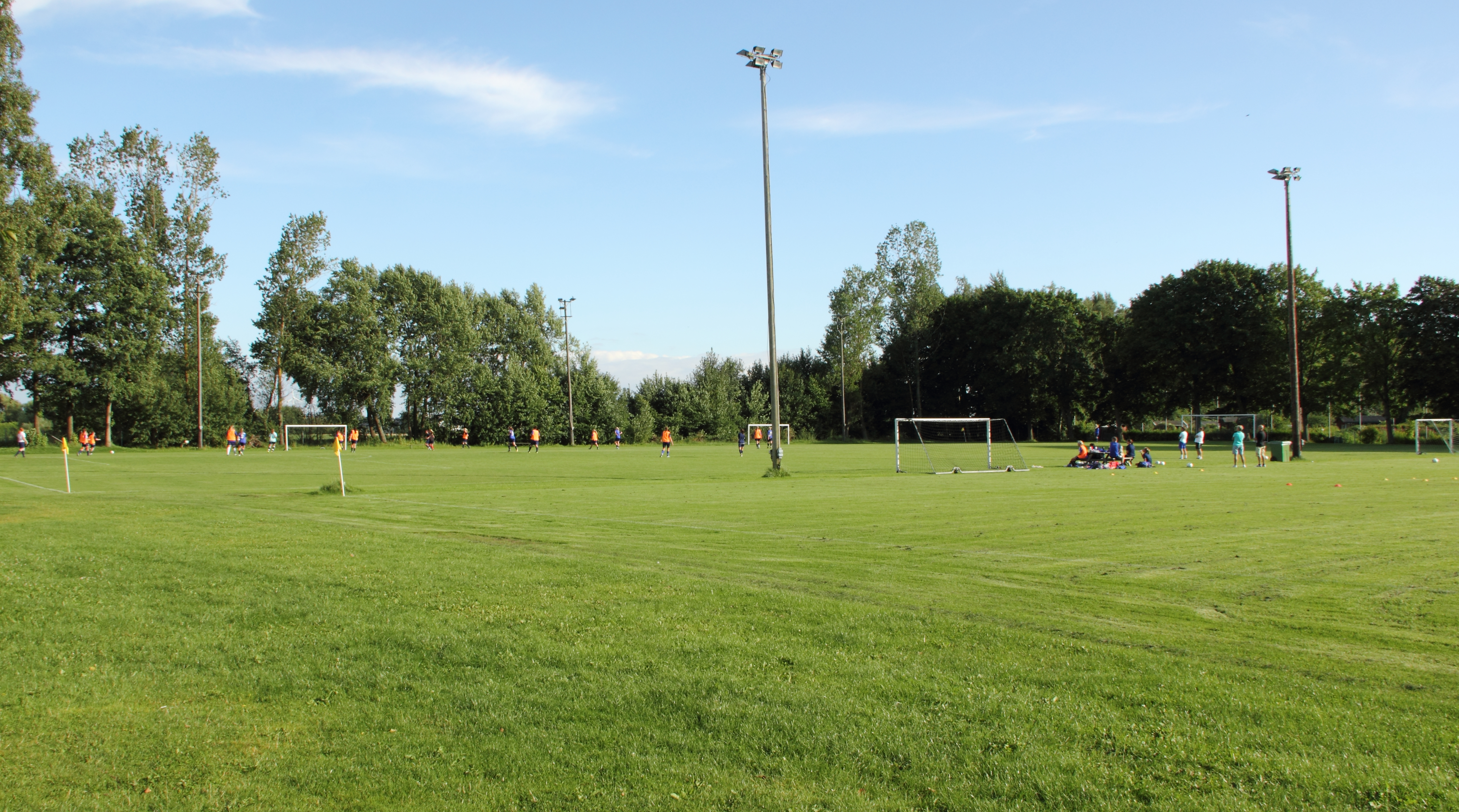
