= 2007 Helsingborgs IF season =

Helsingborgs IF
2007 season
- Manager: Stuart Baxter
- Allsvenskan: 8th
- UEFA Cup: Last 32
- Svenska Cupen: Last 16
- Top goalscorer: Razak Omotoyossi (15)

In 2007, Helsingborgs IF competed in the Allsvenskan, the first division of professional soccer in Sweden, as well as the UEFA Cup and the Svenska Cupen. The club reached the UEFA Cup Round of 32, which was, up to that point, the furthest the club has advanced in a European competition.

== Season summary ==
Helsingborgs finished the Allsvenskan season in eighth place, winning 9 out of their 26 league matches. In the Svenska Cupen, they were knocked out in the round of 16 in a 2–1 loss to Superettan side Landskrona BoIS. In the UEFA Cup, Helsingborgs defeated Estonian side Narva Trans and Irish side Drogheda United in the qualifying rounds. In the first round of the UEFA Cup, Helsingborgs defeated Dutch Eredivisie side SC Heerenveen 8–6 on aggregate to advance into the group stages. In the group stages, they placed second in their group and secured victories over Turkish Super Lig side Galatasary and Austrian Bundesliga side FK Austria Wien. In the Round of 32, Helsingborgs faced Eredivisie side PSV Eindhoven, who defeated them 1–4 on aggregate.

== Squad ==
=== Goalkeepers ===
- (Sweden) Daniel Andersson
- (Sweden) Oscar Berglund

=== Defenders ===
- (Sweden) Andreas Landgren
- (Sweden) Andreas Jakobsson
- (Brazil) (Italy) Leandro Castán
- (Algeria) (France) Samir Beloufa
- (Sweden) Christoffer Andersson
- (Sweden) Erik Wahlstedt
- (Sweden) Oskar Rönningberg
- (Sweden) Joel Ekstrand

=== Midfielders ===
- (Zambia) Isaac Chansa
- (Finland) Fredrik Svanbäck
- (Sweden) Andreas Dahl
- (Sweden) Marcus Lantz
- (Iceland) Ólafur Ingi Skúlason
- (Democratic Republic of the Congo) René Makondele
- (Czech Republic) Martin Kolář
- (Sweden) Babis Stefanidis
- (Sweden) Andreas Dahl
- (Sweden) Mathias Unkuri

=== Attackers ===
- (Sweden) Gustaf Andersson
- (Benin) Razak Omotoyossi
- (Sweden) Henrik Larsson
- (Sweden) Fredrik Olsson
- (Sweden) Patrik Åström

== Allsvenskan ==
=== Matches ===
- Halmstad–Helsingborg 2–1
- 0–1 Razak Omotoyossi 48'
- 1–1 Tomas Žvirgždauskas 49'
- 2–1 Emra Tahirović 73'
- Helsingborg–Gefle 3–1
- 1–0 Andreas Jakobsson 55'
- 1–1 Yannick Bapupa 58'
- 2–1 Daniel Bernhardsson 62' (o.g.)
- 3–1 Henrik Larsson 89'
- Djurgården–Helsingborg 3–1
- 0–1 Andreas Jakobsson 7'
- 1–1 Mattias Jonson 38'
- 2–1 Mattias Jonson 46'
- 3–1 Jones Kusi-Asare 76'
- Helsingborg–Elfsborg 0–1
- 0–1 Andreas Augustsson 3'
- AIK–Helsingborg 0–1
- 0–1 Razak Omotoyossi 48'
- Helsingborg–Malmö FF 0–1
- 0–1 Ola Toivonen 28'
- Brommapojkarna–Helsingborg 1–1
- 0–1 McDonald Mariga 65'
- 1–1 Arash Talebinejad 84'
- Helsingborg–Örebro 4–1
- 0–1 Fredrik Nordback 13'
- 1–1 Olivier Karekezi 42'
- 2–1 Henrik Larsson 57'
- 3–1 Babis Stefanidis 71'
- 4–1 Razak Omotoyossi 90'
- Kalmar FF–Helsingborg 2–0
- 1–0 César Santín 9'
- 2–0 César Santín 60'
- Helsingborg–GAIS 1–1
- 0–1 Eyjólfur Héðinsson 54'
- 1–1 Babis Stefanidis 64'
- Trelleborg–Helsingborg 2–3
- 0–1 Razak Omotoyossi 11'
- 0–2 Andreas Dahl 18'
- 1–2 Erik Sundin 28'
- 2–2 Erik Sundin 48'
- 2–3 Andreas Jakobsson 90'
- Helsingborg–Hammarby 4–2
- 1–0 Samir Beloufa 38'
- 2–0 Razak Omotoyossi 50'
- 3–0 Henrik Larsson 56'
- 3–1 Sebastián Castro Tello 62'
- 3–2 Paulinho Guará 74'
- 4–2 McDonald Mariga 90'
- Helsingborg–IFK Göteborg 2–2
- 0–1 Marcus Berg 29'
- 0–2 Marcus Berg 42' (pen.)
- 1–2 Razak Omotoyossi 53'
- 2–2 Razak Omotoyossi 79'
- Helsingborg–AIK 2–3
- 1–0 Henrik Larsson 20' (pen.)
- 1–1 Mauro Óbolo 33'
- 1–2 Wílton Figueiredo 44'
- 1–3 Lucas Valdemarín 86'
- 2–3 Andreas Jakobsson 90'
- Malmö FF–Helsingborg 1–1
- 1–0 Júnior 34'
- 1–1 Razak Omotoyossi 56'
- GAIS–Helsingborg 0–3
- 0–1 Andreas Landgren 4'
- 0–2 Razak Omotoyossi 34'
- 0–3 Olivier Karekezi 90'
- Helsingborg–Kalmar FF 5–0
- 1–0 Fredrik Svanbäck 15'
- 2–0 Andreas Dahl 21'
- 3–0 Henrik Larsson 24'
- 4–0 Razak Omotoyossi 35'
- 5–0 Henrik Larsson 76'
- Elfsborg–Helsingborg 0–0
- Helsingborg–Djurgården 1–4
- 0–1 Thiago Quirino 51'
- 0–2 Daniel Sjölund 56'
- 0–3 Thiago Quirino 59'
- 1–3 René Makondele 79'
- 1–4 Mikael Dahlberg 84'
- Helsingborg–Brommapojkarna 1–1
- 1–0 Fredrik Svanbäck 16'
- 1–1 Håkan Malmström 59'
- Örebro–Helsingborg 4–3
- 0–1 Razak Omotoyossi 9'
- 0–2 Henrik Larsson 15'
- 1–2 Sebastian Henriksson 25'
- 2–2 Fredrik Nordback 29'
- 3–2 Patrik Anttonen 54'
- 4–2 Stefan Rodevåg 73'
- 4–3 Henrik Larsson 89'
- Helsingborg–Trelleborg 1–1
- 1–0 Andreas Dahl 52'
- 1–1 Michael Mensah 90'
- Hammarby–Helsingborg 0–2
- 0–1 Razak Omotoyossi 45'
- 0–2 Razak Omotoyossi 76'
- Gefle–Helsingborg 4–0
- 1–0 Johan Oremo 50'
- 2–0 Daniel Westlin 61'
- 3–0 Johan Oremo 65'
- 4–0 Jonas Lantto 88'
- Helsingborg–Halmstad 9–0
- 1–0 Christoffer Andersson 16'
- 2–0 Andreas Jakobsson 27'
- 3–0 René Makondele 36'
- 4–0 Christoffer Andersson 44'
- 5–0 Razak Omotoyossi 49'
- 6–0 Henrik Larsson 55'
- 7–0 Erik Wahlstedt 65'
- 8–0 Andreas Landgren 76'
- 9–0 René Makondele 85'

=== Top scorers ===
- (Benin) Razak Omotoyossi - 14 goals
- (Sweden) Henrik Larsson - 9 goals
- (Sweden) Andreas Jakobsson - 5 goals
- (Democratic Republic of the Congo) René Makondele - 3 goals

== UEFA Cup ==
=== 1st round ===
- Helsingborg–Trans Narva 6–0
- 1–0 Razak Omotoyossi 28'
- 2–0 Andreas Dahl 30'
- 3–0 Henrik Larsson 59'
- 4–0 Henrik Larsson 64'
- 5–0 Olivier Karekezi 80'
- 6–0 Christoffer Andersson 84'
- Trans Narva–Helsingborg 0–3
- 0–1 Erik Wahlstedt 18'
- 0–2 Fredrik Svanbäck 32'
- 0–3 Mathias Unkuri 76'

=== 2nd round ===
- Drogheda–Helsingborg 1–1
- 0–1 Henrik Larsson 34'
- 1–1 Eamon Zayed 54'
- Helsingborg–Drogheda 3–0
- 1–0 Andreas Jakobsson 52'
- 2–0 Razak Omotoyossi 68'
- 3–0 Olivier Karekezi 90+1'

=== 3rd round ===
- Heerenveen–Helsingborg 5–3
- 1–0 Michael Bradley 20'
- 2–0 Gerald Sibon 30'
- 3–0 Gerald Sibon 35'
- 3–1 Henrik Larsson 53'
- 3–2 Razak Omotoyossi 57'
- 4–2 Kristian Bak Nielsen 59'
- 5–2 Michael Bradley 60'
- 5–3 Henrik Larsson 71' (pen.)
- Helsingborg–Heerenveen 5–1
- 1–0 Henrik Larsson 18'
- 2–0 Andreas Dahl 37'
- 3–0 Razak Omotoyossi 45+1'
- 4–0 René Makondele 51'
- 5–0 Razak Omotoyossi 80'
- 5–1 Gerald Sibon 89'

=== Group stage ===
- Helsingborg–Panionios 1–1
- 0–1 Fanouris Goundoulakis 45'
- 1–1 Henrik Larsson 83'
- Galatasaray–Helsingborg 2–3
- 0–1 Henrik Larsson 31'
- 0–2 Razak Omotoyossi 39'
- 1–2 Shabani Nonda 44'
- 1–3 Christoffer Andersson 75'
- 2–3 Shabani Nonda 90'
- Helsingborg–Austria Wien 3–0
- 1–0 Ólafur Ingi Skúlason 47'
- 2–0 Razak Omotoyossi 66'
- 3–0 Razak Omotoyossi 70'
- Bordeaux–Helsingborg 2–1
- 1–0 Marouane Chamakh 12'
- 1–1 Henrik Larsson 17'
- 2–1 Jussiê 69'

=== Last 32 ===
- PSV Eindhoven–Helsingborg 2–0
- 1–0 Timmy Simons 7' (pen.)
- 2–0 Danko Lazović 33'
- Helsingborg–PSV Eindhoven 1–2
- 0–1 Otman Bakkal 47'
- 0–2 Danko Lazović 65'
- 1–2 Leandro Castán 81'
