= 2008 Helsingborgs IF season =

Helsingborgs IF
2008 season
- Manager: Bosse Nilsson
- Allsvenskan: 4th
- Svenska Cupen: 3rd Round
- Top goalscorer: Henrik Larsson (14)

Helsingborgs IF had a resurgence season on the domestic scene, finishing in the top four once again. With Henrik Larsson having his best season following his return, the side was able to compensate for the loss of Razak Omotoyossi to Saudi Arabia. The 4th place finish meant Helsingborg qualified for Europe once more.

The year started with a defeat to PSV Eindhoven in the Last 32 of the UEFA Cup, the best performance from a Swedish club for some time. For results of the run see the 2007 article.

== Squad ==
=== Goalkeepers ===
- (Sweden) Daniel Andersson
- (Sweden) Oscar Berglund

=== Defenders ===
- (Mali) Adama Tamboura
- (Sweden) Andreas Landgren
- (Algeria) (France) Samir Beloufa
- (Sweden) Christoffer Andersson
- (Sweden) Erik Wahlstedt
- (Sweden) Marcus Nilsson
- (Sweden) Oskar Rönningberg
- (Sweden) Joel Ekstrand
- (Sweden) Andreas Granqvist

=== Midfielders ===
- (Zambia) Isaac Chansa
- (Finland) Hannu Patronen
- (Finland) Fredrik Svanbäck
- (Sweden) Marcus Lantz
- (Iceland) Ólafur Ingi Skúlason
- (Democratic Republic of the Congo) René Makondele
- (Sweden) Mathias Unkuri
- (Czech Republic) Martin Kolář

=== Attackers ===
- (Austria) Roman Kienast
- (Benin) Razak Omotoyossi
- (Sweden) Henrik Larsson
- (Sweden) Rasmus Jönsson
- (Uganda) Mike Sserumaga

== Allsvenskan ==
=== Matches ===
- GIF Sundsvall-Helsingborg 0-3
- 0-1 Isaac Chansa 9'
- 0-2 Christoffer Andersson 23'
- 0-3 Christoffer Andersson 63'
- Helsingborg-Halmstad 1-1
- 1-0 René Makondele 8'
- 1-1 Martin Fribrock 45'
- Ljungskile-Helsingborg 0-2
- 0-1 Andreas Granqvist 60'
- 0-2 Henrik Larsson 63'
- Helsingborg-Gefle 2-2
- 1-0 Christoffer Andersson 27'
- 1-1 Hans Berggren 57'
- 2-1 Isaac Chansa 83'
- 2-2 Amadou Jawo 90'
- Hammarby-Helsingborg 2-1
- 1-0 Paulinho Guará 3'
- 2-0 Petter Andersson 23'
- 2-1 Razak Omotoyossi 40'
- Helsingborg-IFK Norrköping 2-2
- 0-1 Marcin Burkhardt 27'
- 1-1 Henrik Larsson 47'
- 2-1 Anders Whass 49' (o.g.)
- 2-2 Kristoffer Arvhage 90'
- Kalmar FF-Helsingborg 4-2
- 1-0 Patrik Ingelsten 3'
- 2-0 Viktor Elm 19'
- 2-1 Christoffer Andersson 48'
- 3-1 David Elm 53'
- 3-2 Marcus Lindberg 63' (o.g.)
- 4-2 Viktor Elm 67'
- Helsingborg-Malmö FF 4-2
- 1-0 Razak Omotoyossi 1'
- 1-1 Jonatan Johansson 9'
- 2-1 Henrik Larsson 24'
- 3-1 Henrik Larsson 63'
- 3-2 Jonatan Johansson 64'
- 4-2 Marcus Lantz 76'
- Elfsborg-Helsingborg 1-0
- 1-0 Daniel Mobaeck 33'
- Helsingborg-Örebro 1-0
- 1-0 Henrik Larsson 36'
- Trelleborg-Helsingborg 1-3
- 0-1 Henrik Larsson 4'
- 1-1 Andreas Drugge 6'
- 1-2 René Makondele 26'
- 1-3 Marcus Lantz 73'
- Helsingborg-GAIS 1-0
- 1-0 René Makondele 44'
- IFK Göteborg-Helsingborg 1-1
- 1-0 Jonas Wallerstedt 25'
- 1-1 Christoffer Andersson 73'
- Helsingborg-AIK 2-1
- 0-1 Miran Burgič 12'
- 1-1 Christoffer Andersson 40'
- 2-1 Henrik Larsson 62'
- Helsingborg-Djurgården 2-0
- 1-0 Christoffer Andersson 40'
- 2-0 René Makondele 44'
- Djurgården-Helsingborg 1-2
- 1-0 Johan Oremo 36'
- 1-1 Isaac Chansa 78'
- 1-2 Andreas Landgren 87'
- Helsingborg-GIF Sundsvall 2-1
- 1-0 René Makondele 28'
- 1-1 Ari Freyr Skúlason 62'
- 2-1 Marcus Lantz 74'
- Halmstad-Helsingborg 3-1
- 1-0 Ajsel Kujović 5'
- 2-0 Michael Görlitz 10'
- 3-0 Anselmo 65'
- 3-1 Henrik Larsson 67'
- Helsingborg-Ljungskile 0-1
- 0-1 Daryl Smylie 56'
- Gefle-Helsingborg 3-0
- 1-0 Hans Berggren 15'
- 2-0 Mathias Woxlin 35'
- 3-0 Mathias Woxlin 71'
- Helsingborg-Hammarby 5-1
- 1-0 Christoffer Andersson 14'
- 2-0 Henrik Larsson 37'
- 3-0 Hannu Patronen 59'
- 3-1 Charlie Davies 61'
- 4-1 Henrik Larsson 83'
- 5-1 Roman Kienast 90'
- IFK Norrköping-Helsingborg 3-4
- 0-1 Rasmus Jönsson 12'
- 0-2 Isaac Chansa 16'
- 0-3 Rasmus Jönsson 19'
- 1-3 Kevin Amuneke 56'
- 2-3 Daniel Bamberg 78'
- 2-4 Roman Kienast 84'
- 3-4 Mikael Roth 89'
- Helsingborg-Kalmar FF 1-0
- 1-0 Henrik Larsson 64'
- Malmö FF-Helsingborg 1-2
- 1-0 Edward Ofere 29'
- 1-1 Henrik Larsson 39'
- 1-2 Rasmus Jönsson 63'
- Helsingborg-Elfsborg 2-2
- 1-0 René Makondele 28'
- 2-0 Henrik Larsson 42'
- 2-1 Teddy Lučić 53'
- 2-2 Fredrik Berglund 71'
- Örebro-Helsingborg 3-1
- 0-1 Roman Kienast 7'
- 1-1 Sebastian Henriksson 27'
- 2-1 Kim Olsen 53'
- 3-1 Roni Porokara 76'
- Helsingborg-Trelleborg 1-1
- 0-1 Andreas Drugge 37'
- 1-1 Christoffer Andersson 39'
- GAIS-Helsingborg 0-3
- 0-1 René Makondele 45'
- 0-2 René Makondele 87'
- 0-3 Tobias Holmqvist 90'
- AIK-Helsingborg 3-1
- 1-0 Miran Burgič 56'
- 2-0 Miran Burgič 64'
- 3-0 Gabriel Özkan 68'
- 3-1 Tobias Holmqvist 84'
- Helsingborg-IFK Göteborg 2-1
- 1-0 Patrik Åström 13'
- 1-1 Niclas Alexandersson 27'
- 2-1 Henrik Larsson 54'

=== Topscorers ===
- (Sweden) Henrik Larsson 14
- (Sweden) Christoffer Andersson 8
- (Democratic Republic of the Congo) René Makondele 6
- (Sweden) Marcus Lantz 3
- (Sweden) Rasmus Jönsson 3
- (Zambia) Isaac Chansa 3
