= 2006 Helsingborgs IF season =

Helsingborgs IF
2006 season
- Manager: Peter Swärdh; Stuart Baxter
- Allsvenskan: 4th
- Svenska Cupen: Champions
- Top goalscorer: Olivier Karekezi (11)

Helsingborgs IF had a successful season with the return of Henrik Larsson from Barcelona putting the club into international spotlight. Following a dire start to the season, coach Peter Swärdh was sacked and replaced by Stuart Baxter, the Englishman's first Swedish job for five years. A strong end to the season saw Helsingborg briefly go into title contention, but that was not to be. Instead, Helsingborg beat Gefle 2-0 in the cup final, qualifying for the UEFA Cup as an effect.

== Squad ==
=== Goalkeepers ===
- (Sweden) Daniel Andersson
- (Sweden) Oscar Berglund
- (Sweden) Pär Hansson

=== Defenders ===
- (Sweden) Tony Mahr
- (Mali) Adama Tamboura
- (Sweden) Jacob Augustsson
- (Sweden) Andreas Jakobsson
- (Sweden) Andreas Granqvist
- (Argentina) (Italy) Franco Miranda
- (Sweden) Erik Wahlstedt
- (Sweden) Fredrik Björck
- (Sweden) Oskar Rönningberg
- (Sweden) Andreas Landgren

=== Midfielders ===
- (Finland) Fredrik Svanbäck
- (Sweden) Andreas Dahl
- (Kenya) McDonald Mariga
- (Sweden) Babis Stefanidis
- (Sweden) Fahrudin Karišik
- (Sweden) Eldin Karišik
- (Sweden) Patrik Åström

=== Attackers ===
- (Rwanda) Olivier Karekezi
- (Jamaica) Luton Shelton
- (Sweden) Henrik Larsson
- (Sweden) Gustaf Andersson
- (Sweden) Tobias Holmqvist
- (Sweden) Alexander Zaim

== Allsvenskan ==
=== Matches ===
- Hammarby-Helsingborg 4-2
- 1-0 Paulinho Guará 20'
- 2-0 Paulinho Guará 32'
- 3-0 Björn Runström 35'
- 3-1 Gustaf Andersson 68'
- 4-1 Max von Schlebrügge 84'
- 4-2 McDonald Mariga 89'
- Helsingborg-GAIS 1-0
- 1-0 Olivier Karekezi 25'
- IFK Göteborg-Helsingborg 2-2
- 0-1 Olivier Karekezi 15'
- 0-2 McDonald Mariga 18'
- 1-2 Thomas Olsson 25'
- 2-2 Jonas Wallerstedt 47'
- Helsingborg-AIK 1-1
- 0-1 Wílton Figueiredo 25'
- 1-1 Babis Stefanidis 81'
- Gefle-Helsingborg 1-0
- 1-0 Kristen Viikmäe 55'
- Helsingborg-Öster 4-0
- 1-0 Luton Shelton 43'
- 2-0 Olivier Karekezi 45'
- 3-0 Olivier Karekezi 63'
- 4-0 Babis Stefanidis 74'
- Malmö FF-Helsingborg 3-1
- 1-0 Edward Ofere 19'
- 1-1 Babis Stefanidis 52'
- 2-1 Afonso Alves 78'
- 3-1 Marcus Pode 88'
- Helsingborg-Halmstad 1-1
- 1-0 Luton Shelton 3'
- 1-1 Dušan Đurić 8'
- Elfsborg-Helsingborg 0-0
- Helsingborg-Häcken 1-3
- 0-1 Hans Berggren 17'
- 1-1 Olivier Karekezi 45'
- 1-2 Robert Mambu-Mumba 72'
- 1-3 Daniel Larsson 90'
- Örgryte-Helsingborg 1-1
- 1-0 Aílton Almeida 77'
- 1-1 Gustaf Andersson 87'
- Helsingborg-Kalmar FF 2-1
- 0-1 Viktor Elm 58'
- 1-1 Henrik Larsson 69'
- 2-1 Luton Shelton 89'
- Djurgården-Helsingborg 2-1
- 1-0 Matias Concha 40'
- 1-1 Luton Shelton 70'
- 2-1 Tobias Hysén 74'
- Helsingborg-Djurgården 1-1
- 1-0 Luton Shelton 14'
- 1-1 Mattias Jonson 25'
- Helsingborg-Hammarby 3-1
- 0-1 Max von Schlebrügge 18'
- 1-1 Henrik Larsson 45'
- 2-1 Henrik Larsson 47'
- 3-1 Fredrik Svanbäck 69'
- GAIS-Helsingborg 0-2
- 0-1 McDonald Mariga 70'
- 0-2 Olivier Karekezi 75'
- Helsingborg-Malmö FF 3-1
- 0-1 Jonatan Johansson 23'
- 1-1 Luton Shelton 53'
- 2-1 Luton Shelton 66'
- 3-1 Gustaf Andersson 90'
- Halmstad-Helsingborg 1-1
- 0-1 Henrik Larsson 20'
- 1-1 Martin Fribrock 64'
- Helsingborg-Gefle 2-0
- 1-0 Babis Stefanidis 28'
- 2-0 Olivier Karekezi 75'
- Öster-Helsingborg 0-3
- 0-1 Olivier Karekezi 7'
- 0-2 Henrik Larsson 20'
- 0-3 McDonald Mariga 82'
- Helsingborg-IFK Göteborg 3-2
- 1-0 Fredrik Svanbäck 13'
- 2-0 Babis Stefanidis 32'
- 3-0 Henrik Larsson 40'
- 3-1 Stefan Selaković 89'
- 3-2 Pontus Wernbloom 90'
- AIK-Helsingborg 2-2
- 0-1 Luton Shelton 39'
- 1-1 Miran Burgič 47'
- 2-1 Nicklas Carlsson 60'
- 2-2 own goal 90'
- Helsingborg-Örgryte 2-1
- 1-0 Olivier Karekezi 3'
- 1-1 Ola Toivonen 6'
- 2-1 Olivier Karekezi 82'
- Kalmar FF-Helsingborg 2-4
- 1-0 Ari 9'
- 1-1 own goal 11'
- 1-2 Luton Shelton 25'
- 1-3 Henrik Larsson 61'
- 2-3 Ari 72'
- 2-4 Henrik Larsson 83'
- Helsingborg-Elfsborg 1-1
- 0-1 Mathias Svensson 62'
- 1-1 Olivier Karekezi 64'
- Häcken-Helsingborg 3-0
- 1-0 Dioh Williams 34'
- 2-0 Teddy Lučić 46'
- 3-0 Jonas Henriksson 65'

=== Topscorers ===
- (Rwanda) Olivier Karekezi 11
- (Jamaica) Luton Shelton 9
- (Sweden) Henrik Larsson 8
- (Kenya) McDonald Mariga 4
- (Sweden) Babis Stefanidis 4
- (Sweden) Gustaf Andersson 3
