= 2006 Svenska Cupen final =

- Event: 2006 Svenska Cupen
Gefle IF	Helsingborgs IF
0	2
- Date: 11 November 2006
- Venue: Råsunda Stadium, Solna
- Referee: Stefan Johannesson
- Attendance: 3,379

The 2006 Svenska Cupen Final took place on November 11, 2006, at Råsunda Stadium in Solna, Sweden. It was contested by Allsvenskan teams Gefle IF and Helsingborgs IF. It was Gefle's first final of all time. Helsingborg, who had won the cup two times before the match, played their latest final in 1998.

In this final, Helsingborg were the sharper team and won 2–0, thanks to goals by Luton Shelton and Babis Stefanidis.

== Road to the Final ==
Gefle IF		Helsingborgs IF
Ängelholms FF [D1] A 1-1 (AET), 2-4 (p)	Second round	Skärhamns IK [D1] A 0-2
Åtvidabergs FF [SE] H 4-2	Third round	Hammarby IF [AS] A 1-3
Halmstads BK [AS] A 0-3	Fourth round	Degerfors IF [SE] H 3-0
Landskrona BoIS [SE] A 2-3	Quarter finals	IF Elfsborg [AS] A 4-4 (AET), 5-3 (p)
Kalmar FF [AS] A 1-1 (AET), 3-4 (p)	Semi finals	Östers IF [AS] H 3-0

- Square brackets [ ] represent the opposition's division.

== Match details ==
11 November 2006
16:00 CET

Gefle IF	0–2	Helsingborgs IF
	Report	Shelton 28'; Stefanidis 53'

Råsunda Stadium, Solna
Attendance: 3,379
Referee: Stefan Johannesson

Gefle	Helsingborg

GK	1	(Sweden) Mattias Hugosson
RB	5	(Sweden) Andreas Revahl
CB	2	(Sweden) Thomas Hedlund
CB	16	(Sweden) Magnus Wikström
LB	7	(Sweden) Patrik Karlsson
RM	12	(Sweden) Daniel Bernhardsson	Booked
CM	19	(Democratic Republic of the Congo) Yannick Bapupa
CM	8	(Sweden) Johannes Ericsson (c)
LM	11	(Sweden) Johan Claesson
FW	24	(Democratic Republic of the Congo) René Makondele
FW	20	(Sweden) Daniel Westlin		(substituted off) 72'
Substitutes:
DF	6	(Sweden) Anders Wikström
FW	10	(Estonia) Kristen Viikmäe		(substituted on) 72'
MF	13	(Sweden) Jonathan Hellström
MF	15	(Sweden) Petter Österberg
GK	22	(Sweden) Martin Sundström
Manager:
(Sweden) Per Olsson

GK	1	(Sweden) Daniel Andersson
RB	23	(Sweden) Erik Wahlstedt
CB	14	(Sweden) Andreas Granqvist (c)	Booked
CB	24	(Sweden) Fredrik Björck
LB	16	(Argentina) Franco Miranda
RM	19	(Sweden) Babis Stefanidis
CM	5	(Sweden) Andreas Jakobsson
CM	10	(Kenya) McDonald Mariga		(substituted off) 90'
LM	8	(Sweden) Fredrik Svanbäck		(substituted off) 86'
FW	13	(Jamaica) Luton Shelton		(substituted off) 89'
FW	17	(Sweden) Henrik Larsson
Substitutes:
FW	7	(Sweden) Gustaf Andersson		(substituted on) 89'
FW	15	(Rwanda) Olivier Karekezi		(substituted on) 86'
GK	22	(Sweden) Oscar Berglund
DF	25	(Sweden) Oskar Rönningberg
MF	28	(Sweden) Andreas Landgren		(substituted on) 90'
Manager:
(Scotland) Stuart Baxter

== See also ==
- 2006 Svenska Cupen
