= 2009 Helsingborgs IF season =

Helsingborgs IF
2009 season
- Manager: Bosse Nilsson
- Allsvenskan: 8th
- Europa League: 3rd Qualifying Round
- Svenska Cupen: Semi-final
- Top goalscorer: Rasmus Jönsson (8)

Helsingborgs IF had a disappointing season, losing to Sarajevo in the UEFA Europa League and only just finished in the top half, causing the resignation of coach Bosse Nilsson. The club's marquee player Henrik Larsson chose to retire from professional football aged 38, taking over Landskrona as manager.

== Squad ==
=== Goalkeepers ===
- (Sweden) Daniel Andersson
- (Sweden) Pär Hansson

=== Defenders ===
- (Mali) Adama Tamboura
- (Sweden) Andreas Landgren
- (Sweden) Markus Holgersson
- (Sweden) Christoffer Andersson
- (Sweden) Erik Wahlstedt
- (Sweden) Marcus Nilsson
- (Sweden) Joel Ekstrand

=== Midfielders ===
- (Finland) Hannu Patronen
- (South Africa) May Mahlangu
- (Finland) Fredrik Svanbäck
- (Sweden) Erik Sundin
- (Sweden) Marcus Lantz
- (Iceland) Ólafur Ingi Skúlason
- (Sweden) Marcus Bergholtz
- (Democratic Republic of the Congo) René Makondele
- (Sweden) Mathias Unkuri
- (Zambia) Isaac Chansa
- (Nigeria) Yakubu Alfa

=== Attackers ===
- (Brazil) Rafael Porcellis
- (Sweden) Henrik Larsson
- (Sweden) Rasmus Jönsson

== Allsvenskan ==
=== Matches ===
- Helsingborg-IFK Göteborg 1-0
- 1-0 Marcus Lantz 45' (pen.)
- GAIS-Helsingborg 1-4
- 0-1 Rasmus Jönsson 7'
- 1-1 Tommy Lycén 35'
- 1-2 Erik Sundin 48'
- 1-3 René Makondele 61'
- 1-4 Henrik Larsson 86'
- Helsingborg-Hammarby 1-0
- 1-0 Christoffer Andersson 79'
- Örebro-Helsingborg 2-0
- 1-0 Kim Olsen 60'
- 2-0 Emra Tahirović 89'
- Helsingborg-Halmstad 1-3
- 1-0 Marcus Holgersson 28'
- 1-1 Anselmo 69'
- 1-2 Joe Sise 80'
- 1-3 Mikael Rosén 90'
- AIK-Helsingborg 0-3
- 0-1 Rasmus Jönsson 15'
- 0-2 Rasmus Jönsson 53'
- 0-3 Rasmus Jönsson 78'
- Helsingborg-Malmö FF 1-0
- 1-0 Henrik Larsson 89'
- Brommapojkarna-Helsingborg 0-3
- 0-1 Marcus Holgersson 7'
- 0-2 Olof Guterstam 33' (o.g.)
- 0-3 Henrik Larsson 35'
- Helsingborg-Trelleborg 2-2
- 1-0 Christoffer Andersson 1'
- 2-0 René Makondele 30'
- 2-1 Max Fuxberg 40'
- 2-2 Fisnik Shala 55'
- Häcken-Helsingborg 3-0
- 1-0 Mathias Ranégie 30'
- 2-0 Mathias Ranégie 55'
- 3-0 Jonas Henriksson 73'
- Helsingborg-Örgryte 3-1
- 1-0 Marcus Lantz 52'
- 2-0 Erik Sundin 88'
- 2-1 Daniel Leinar 90'
- 3-1 Mathias Unkuri 90'
- Kalmar FF-Helsingborg 2-0
- 1-0 Daniel Sobralense 33'
- 2-0 Rasmus Elm 49'
- Djurgården-Helsingborg 2-1
- 1-0 Patrik Haginge 13'
- 2-0 Sebastian Rajalakso 31'
- 2-1 Rasmus Jönsson 61'
- Helsingborg-Elfsborg 3-2
- 1-0 Christoffer Andersson 12'
- 2-0 Rasmus Jönsson 48'
- 2-1 Emir Bajrami 52'
- 2-2 Emir Bajrami 63'
- 3-2 Rasmus Jönsson 70'
- Gefle-Helsingborg 0-2
- 0-1 Christoffer Andersson 47'
- 0-2 Erik Sundin 64'
- Helsingborg-Gefle 2-0
- 1-0 Henrik Larsson 24'
- 2-0 Marcus Lantz 82' (pen.)
- Hammarby-Helsingborg 1-2
- 0-1 René Makondele 41'
- 0-2 Erik Sundin 60'
- 1-2 Andreas Dahl 65'
- Helsingborg-Örebro 0-1
- 0-1 Kim Olsen 57'
- IFK Göteborg-Helsingborg 2-2
- 1-0 Sebastian Eriksson 28'
- 2-0 Erik Lund 30'
- 2-1 René Makondele 47'
- 2-2 René Makondele 77'
- Helsingborg-GAIS 0-1
- 0-1 Eyjólfur Héðinsson 8'
- Helsingborg-Brommapojkarna 0-1
- 0-1 Pablo Piñones-Arce 13'
- Halmstad-Helsingborg 2-1
- 1-0 Michael Görlitz 30'
- 2-0 Anselmo 49'
- 2-1 Marcus Lantz 65'
- Helsingborg-AIK 3-2
- 1-0 Andreas Landgren 44'
- 2-0 Henrik Larsson 45'
- 2-1 Jos Hooiveld 61'
- 3-1 Henrik Larsson 70'
- 3-2 Dulee Johnson 86'
- Trelleborg-Helsingborg 4-2
- 0-1 Rasmus Jönsson 7'
- 0-2 Christoffer Andersson 30'
- 1-2 Andreas Wihlborg 47'
- 2-2 Joakim Sjöhage 56'
- 3-2 Joakim Sjöhage 61'
- 4-2 Fredrik Jensen 85'
- Helsingborg-Häcken 1-0
- 1-0 Henrik Larsson 87'
- Örgryte-Helsingborg 3-0
- 1-0 Álvaro Santos 24' (pen.)
- 2-0 Álvaro Santos 56'
- 3-0 Álvaro Santos 65'
- Helsingborg-Kalmar FF 1-1
- 1-0 René Makondele 10'
- 1-1 Ricardo Santos 30'
- Helsingborg-Djurgården 0-2
- 0-1 Yosif Ayuba 36'
- 0-2 Prince Ikpe Ekong 69'
- Elfsborg-Helsingborg 1-0
- 1-0 James Keene 73'

=== Topscorers ===
- (Sweden) Rasmus Jönsson 8
- (Sweden) Henrik Larsson 7
- (Democratic Republic of the Congo) René Makondele 5
- (Sweden) Marcus Lantz 4
- (Sweden) Erik Sundin 4
