= 2012 Svenska Supercupen =

- Event: Svenska Supercupen
Helsingborgs IF	AIK
2	0
- Date: 24 March 2012
- Venue: Olympia, Helsingborg
- Referee: Markus Strömbergsson (Gävle)
- Attendance: 5,590

2012 Svenska Supercupen (Swedish Super Cup 2012) was the 6th edition Svenska Supercupen annual football match that Helsingborg (league and cup double-champions) successfully defended against league runners-up AIK. The match was staged on 24 March 2012 at Olympia, Helsingborg. Svenska Supercupen is usually contested by the winners of the previous season's Allsvenskan and Svenska Cupen. However, Helsingborg won both titles in 2011, they faced the Allsvenskan runners-up AIK. This was the first match the two teams faced each other in Supercupen's existence: Helsingborgs third Supercupen appearance and AIKs second Supercupen appearance. This was the 2nd match involving a double champion team following a hiatus since 2010. Olympia hosted the final for the first time.

The match was broadcast live on TV4 Sport, of the TV4 Group. FIFA selected Markus Strömbergsson from Gävle as the match referee for the third consecutive game. Helsingborg won the match 2–0 after two goals from Dutch midfielder Rachid Bouaouzan. This was Helsingborgs second consecutive Supercupen title in the competition and fifth consecutive title in Swedish football.

== Match facts ==
24 March 2012
14:00 (UTC+1)

Helsingborgs IF	2–0	AIK
Bouaouzan 58', 70'	Report

Olympia, Helsingborg
Attendance: 5,590
Referee: Markus Strömbergsson (Gävle)

Helsingborgs IF
AIK

HELSINGBORGS IF:
GK	30	(Sweden) Pär Hansson (c)
RB	21	(Sweden) Christoffer Andersson
CB	3	(Sweden) Loret Sadiku
CB	4	(Sweden) Walid Atta	(substituted off) 68'
LB	23	(Sweden) Erik Wahlstedt
RM	5	(Sweden) Daniel Nordmark	(yellow card) 60'
CM	8	(Norway) Ardian Gashi
CM	6	(South Africa) May Mahlangu
LM	13	(Netherlands) Rachid Bouaouzan
FW	19	(Iceland) Alfreð Finnbogason	(substituted off) 82'
FW	11	(Norway) Thomas Sørum	(substituted off) 86'
Substitutes:
GK	1	(Sweden) Daniel Andersson
DF	15	(Sweden) Emil Krafth
DF	16	(Sweden) Joseph Baffo	(substituted in) 68'
DF	28	(Finland) Jere Uronen
MF	2	(Sweden) Marcus Bergholtz
MF	7	(Sweden) Mattias Lindström	(substituted in) 82'
FW	10	(Brazil) Álvaro Santos	(substituted in) 86'
Manager:
(Sweden) Conny Karlsson

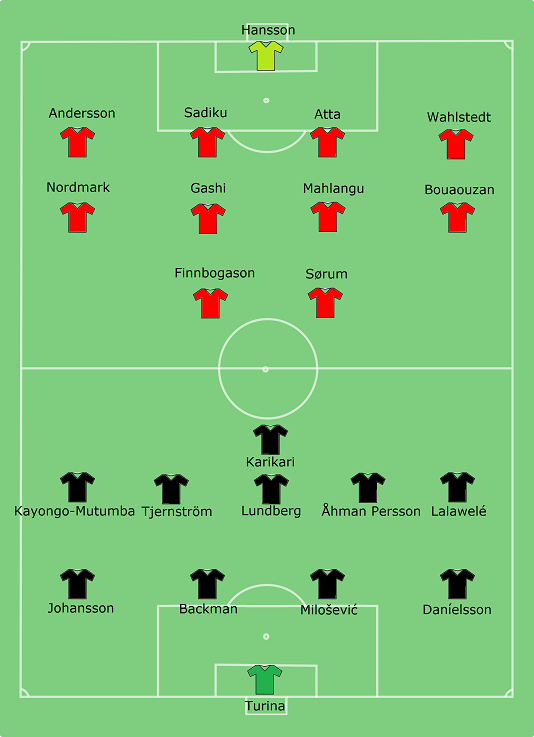

AIK:
GK	27	(Croatia) Ivan Turina	(yellow card) 59'
RB	7	(Iceland) Helgi Daníelsson
CB	6	(Sweden) Alexander Milošević	(red card) 90+1'
CB	2	(Sweden) Niklas Backman	(yellow card) 90+4'
LB	4	(Sweden) Nils-Eric Johansson
RM	11	(Togo) Atakora Lalawelé	(yellow card) 61'
CM	5	(Sweden) Robert Åhman Persson	(substituted off) 80'
CM	28	(Sweden) Viktor Lundberg	(substituted off) 78'
CM	8	(Sweden) Daniel Tjernström (c)	(yellow card) 61'
LM	9	(Uganda) Martin Kayongo-Mutumba
FW	22	(Ghana) Kwame Karikari	(yellow card) 52'	(substituted off) 63'
Substitutes:
GK	35	(Scotland) Lee Baxter
DF	3	(Sweden) Per Karlsson
DF	16	(Sweden) Martin Lorentzson
MF	15	(Sweden) Robin Quaison	(substituted in) 80'
MF	24	(Sweden) Daniel Gustavsson
MF	29	(Sweden) Gabriel Özkan	(substituted in) 78'
FW	21	(Sweden) Pontus Engblom	(substituted in) 63'
Manager:
(Sweden) Andreas Alm

MATCH OFFICIALS

- Assistant referees:
  - Mathias Klasenius, (Örebro)
  - Per Brogevik (Kumla)
- Fourth official: Daniel Stålhammar (Landskrona)

MATCH RULES

- 90 minutes.
- 30 minutes of extra-time if necessary.
- Penalty shoot-out if scores still level.
- Seven named substitutes.
- Maximum of three substitutions.

== See also ==
- 2011 Allsvenskan
- 2011 Svenska Cupen
