= Regonesi =

Regonesi is an Italian surname. Notable people with the surname include:

- Giuliano Regonesi (born 1964), Italian researcher
- Mónica Regonesi (born 1961), Chilean long-distance runner
- Pierre Giorgio Regonesi (born 1979), Italian footballer
