= Benin Football Federation =

Governing body of association football in Benin

CAF
- Founded: 1960
- FIFA affiliation: 1964
- CAF affiliation: 1963
- President: Moucharafou Anjorin
- Website: https://febefoot.org/

The Benin Football Federation (French: Fédération Béninoise de Football, FEBEFOOT, FBF) is the governing body of association football in Benin. It was founded in 1960, affiliated to CAF in 1963 and to FIFA in 1964. It organizes the national football leagues, including the Benin Premier League and overlooks national teams, most notably the national team.

== 2010 Africa Cup of Nations fallout ==
The FBF sacked the entire playing and coaching staff following the Benin national football teams exit from the 2010 Africa Cup of Nations, citing indiscipline and a lack of patriotism.

The Benin player Razak Omotoyossi said that the FBF had tried to 'tarnish' the image of the national team "We are not indisciplined players and they just want to tarnish our image...The truth is the players were fighting for their rights."

Omotoyossi acknowledged that there had been disputes between the players and the FBF but said the squad wanted things to be done properly. Omotoyossi said players had not been receiving their jerseys in time, and with wrong numbers, and that payments of allowances and bonuses to the players were also delayed.

== 2011 rival presidential bid ==
A rival group of officials within the FBF elected Victorien Attolou their new president in February 2011. Attolou was elected by a group that claimed president Moucharafou Anjorin was no longer in charge. Twelve of the fifteen member executive committee resigned after accusing Moucharafou of being a dictator. The election was held following the failure by FIFA to resolve the initial dispute between Moucharafou and the officials. Moucharafou stated that "I am unconcerned about the elections held over the weekend because I am still the man in charge of the federation".

FIFA later confirmed that Moucharafou was President of the federation.

== Moucharafou arrest ==
Moucharafou was arrested and arraigned before a court in July 2011 for misappropriation of the FBF's funds. He was accused of embezzling US$650,000 sponsorship money from a mobile phone company between 2008 and 2010. Moucharafou was remanded in custody in prison, pending a trial, for which no date has been set.
