= Pierre Giorgio Regonesi =

Italian footballer

Pierre Regonesi
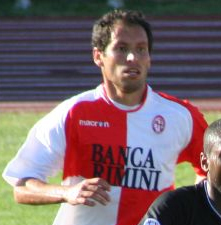

Personal information
- Full name: Pierre Giorgio Regonesi
- Date of birth: 22 February 1979 (age 47)
- Place of birth: Osio Sotto, Italy
- Height: 1.79 m (5 ft 10 in)
- Position: Left back

Youth career
- Atalanta

Senior career*
Years	Team	Apps	(Gls)
1997–2001	Atalanta	21	(0)
2000–2001	→ Empoli (loan)	18	(2)
2001–2006	AlbinoLeffe	168	(14)
2006–2010	Rimini	132	(3)
2010–2014	AlbinoLeffe	74	(4)
2014–2015	Ponte SP Mapello	27	(1)
2015–2018	FCD Calcio Casazza		
Total		440	(24)

International career
1994	Italy U15	3	(0)
1995	Italy U16	4	(0)
1995–1997	Italy U18	23	(3)
1999	Italy U20	1	(0)
- * Club domestic league appearances and goals

Pierre Giorgio Regonesi (born 22 February 1979) is a Italian former professional footballer who plays as a left back.

== Biography ==
=== Atalanta ===
Born in Osio Sotto, the province of Bergamo, Lombardy, Regonesi started his career at hometown club Atalanta Bergamo. Regonesi made his Serie A debut on 1 June 1997, against Reggiana, replacing Paolo Foglio in the 82nd minute.

After Atalanta relegated in 1998, Regonesi had a more regular chance to play, which he played 14 games in 1998–99 Serie B season.

=== Juventus ===
In January 1999 he was signed by Juventus, for 4.5 billion Lire (€2,324,056) in co-ownership deal (i.e. 50% registration rights), He was included in Juventus squad for 1999 Torneo di Viareggio. After the youth tournament, Regonesi returned to Atalanta immediately; he left Atalanta again in January 2000 for Empoli, where he remained until June 2001. Regonesi was also signed by Juventus outright that month, as Atalanta cut the remain price from 4.5 billion lire to about 50 million lire, which Juventus received a financial income of "€2.298 million" (4.45 billion lire) for releasing the residual value of co-ownership debt, co-currently the player was sold back to the province of Bergamo for Serie C1 side AlbinoLeffe for an undisclosed fee on 2 July, (Note: Juventus did not announce the fee, but the release of Juan Esnáider and selling of Regonesi had made Juve saved amortization cost of €3.5 million (€1.2 million in second half of 2001–02 season; €2.3 million in 2002–03) which equal the release of Esnáider for €2.104 million (contract due to expire on 30 June 2003) and selling loss of €1.413 million for Regonesi.) made Juventus "loss" of €1.413 million (it means the residual value of the contract in accounting was greater than revenue), but de facto a gain of €0.885 million if combining the two value, as Juve had over-amortize the contract value of Regonesi as it was based on the full price €4,648,112 to schedule. On the same day Juventus also signed Roberto Pellegris.

=== AlbinoLeffe ===
Regonesi, with the Serie C1 side, he won 2003 promotion playoffs and promoted to Serie B for the first time. He became a regular starter in the 2nd season with AlbinoLeffe and was in the starting XI until 2006.

=== Rimini ===
In July 2006, he was sold to Serie B struggler Rimini in another co-ownership deal, for €1.6 million. The team reached the fifth that season, the best record in the recent season. In the next season he finished 7th in Serie B, made Rimini purchased him outright for €900,000. These 2 seasons, Regonesi was the absolute starter in the defense line, and represent the most games among the defenders.

But in 2008–09 season, Rimini made a backward on goalscoring, and Rimini lost to Ancona in the relegation playoffs. Regonesi himself was injured on 14 March 2009 and missed rest of the fixture.

Returned to Lega Pro Prima Divisione (ex-Serie C1) since 2003, Regonesi entered promotion playoffs again, but this time losing to Verona. in the semi-final/first round. After the season (formally on 16 July) Rimini was expelled from professional league due to its financial record, the club went bankrupt and all players were released.

=== Returned to AlbinoLeffe ===
On 5 August 2010, Regonesi returned to AlbinoLeffe, signed a 3-year contract. Regonesi made his club debut on 15 August 2010, which the team won fellow Serie B club Pescara 3–1 in Coppa Italia.

In the next match, the opening match of Serie B, the coach remained to use 352 formation and Regonesi was featured in midfield as left wingback.

=== International career ===
He capped for Italy at 1996, 1997 and 1998 UEFA European Under-18 Football Championship qualification. He reached the final phase in 1997 season, finished as the bottom of Group B (4 teams each in 2 groups). He also capped for Italy at 1995 UEFA European Under-16 Football Championship in qualifying and final phase.

== Honours ==
- Serie C1: 2003
