= Oskar Rönningberg =

Swedish footballer

Personal information
- Full name: Oskar Mikael Rönningberg
- Date of birth: 2 April 1986 (age 40)
- Place of birth: Lund, Sweden
- Height: 1.81 m (5 ft 11 1/2 in)
- Position: Defender

Youth career
- 1992–2001: Torns IF
- 2001–2006: Helsingborgs IF

Senior career*
Years	Team	Apps	(Gls)
2006–2008	Helsingborgs IF	22	(0)

International career
2001–2003	Sweden U17	21	(1)
2004	Sweden U19	4	(1)
2006–2007	Sweden U21	2	(0)
2008	Sweden	2	(0)
- * Club domestic league appearances and goals

Oskar Mikael Rönningberg (born 2 April 1986) is a Swedish former professional footballer who played as a centre back. He represented Helsingborgs IF between 2006 and 2008 before his career was cut short because of an injury. He won two caps for the Sweden national team in 2008.

== Club career ==
=== Early career ===
Rönningberg started off his career with Torns IF in Lund, helping his youth team finish fourth in the 2001 season of Pojkallsvenskan. In 2002, Rönningberg left Torns IF to sign with the Allsvenskan club Helsingborgs IF. In 2006 he became the first ever former Torns IF player to play in Allsvenskan.

=== Helsingborgs IF ===
==== 2006 season ====
Rönningberg made his Allsvenskan debut for Helsingborg on 2 May 2006 in a home game against Östers IF, which Helsingborg won 4–0. During his first senior season with the club, he played in 11 Allsvenskan games and was an unused substitute in the 2006 Svenska Cupen final as Helsingborg won the 2006 Svenska Cupen title.

==== 2007 season ====
In 2007, Rönningberg made another 11 Allsvenskan appearances and was a part of the Helsingborg team that competed in the 2007–08 UEFA Cup. On 8 November 2007, he played in all 90 minutes as Helsingborg beat Galatasaray 3–2 away. He played in all four UEFA Cup group stage games as Helsingborgs IF advanced to the Round of 32 before being eliminated by PSV Eindhoven.

==== Injury and retirement ====
In a pre-season friendly game in March 2008 against SK Brann, Rönningberg suffered a severe knee injury with 15 minutes left of the game. The injury made Rönningberg miss the entire 2008 season, and ultimately forced him to announce his retirement from professional football in September 2008 at the age of 22.

== International career ==
After having represented the Sweden U17, U19, and U21 teams, Rönningberg made his full international debut for Sweden on 13 January 2008 in a friendly game against Costa Rica, replacing Behrang Safari in the 68th minute in game that Sweden won 1–0. He won his second and final international cap six days later in a friendly game against the United States, playing for 61 minutes before being replaced by Safari in a game that Sweden lost 2–0.

== Career statistics ==
=== Club ===
Appearances and goals by club, season and competition
Club	Season	League			Svenska Cupen		UEFA Cup		Total	
Club	Season	Division	Apps	Goals	Apps	Goals	Apps	Goals	Apps	Goals
Helsingborgs IF	2006	Allsvenskan	11	0	4	0	0	0	15	0
Helsingborgs IF	2007	Alllsvenskan	11	0	3	0	7	0	21	0
Helsingborgs IF	2008	Allsvenskan	0	0	0	0	–		0	0
Career total			22	0	7	0	7	0	36	0

=== International ===
Appearances and goals by national team and year
National team	Year	Apps	Goals
Sweden	2008	2	0
Total		2	0

== Honours ==
Helsingborgs IF

- Svenska Cupen: 2006
