= Giuliano Regonesi =

Italian researcher (born 1964)

- Born: 1964 (age 61–62); Bergamo, Italy
- Scientific career
- Fields: Microalgae; Ultraviolet light; Bioreactors
- Workplaces: MicroAlgaeX A.S.

Giuliano Regonesi (born March 1964) is an Italian researcher. He is the chief executive officer of MicroAlgaeX, in Istanbul, Turkey. His work primarily focuses on air purification and carbon capture.

== Education ==
Regonesi attained his master's degree from Bocconi University.

== Career ==
In 2020, he became CEO at Noor UVC Technology.

He is the author of the book Storia dell'industria metallurgica in Lombardia. He contributed to the book Giuseppe Donizetti. Il Pascià bergamasco.

In 2022, Regonesi founded MicroAlgaeX, where he is CEO. The company specializes in microalgae technology.

In 2024, the company raised a $47 million funding round.

In 2025, MicroAlgaeX launched the Liquid Tree project in his hometown of Bergamo with local educational institutions.

== Personal life ==
Regonesi is from Bergamo, Italy.
