= Jonathan Hellström =

Swedish footballer

Personal information
- Full name: Jonathan Hellström
- Date of birth: 9 August 1988 (age 38)
- Height: 1.81 m (5 ft 11 1/2 in)
- Position: Midfielder

Team information
- Current team: Sandvikens IF

Youth career
- –2001: Hille IF
- 2002–2005: Gefle IF

Senior career*
Years	Team	Apps	(Gls)
2006–2012	Gefle IF	72	(0)
2013–	Sandvikens IF	0	(0)

International career^{‡}
2006–2007	Sweden U19	12	(0)
2007–2009	Sweden U21	2	(0)
- * Club domestic league appearances and goals as of 10 January 2012 ‡ National team caps and goals as of 10 January 2012

Jonathan Hellström (born 9 August 1988) is a Swedish footballer who plays for Sandvikens IF as a midfielder.
