= Fredrik Nordback =

Finnish footballer (born 1979)

Personal information
- Full name: Carl Fredrik Nordback
- Date of birth: 20 March 1979 (age 47)
- Place of birth: Hanko, Finland
- Height: 1.79 m (5 ft 10 in)
- Position: Midfielder

Youth career
- HIK
- Örebro

Senior career*
Years	Team	Apps	(Gls)
1995–2011	Örebro	300	(29)

International career^{‡}
2003–2005	Finland	7	(0)
- * Club domestic league appearances and goals as of 4 December 2009 ‡ National team caps and goals as of 4 March 2009

Fredrik Nordback (born 20 March 1979) is a Finnish former footballer who played the majority of his career for Örebro SK.

== Career ==
Nordback made his senior debut for Örebro SK in 1997, two years after arriving from Hangö IK. He played over 130 Allsvenskan games for Örebro and he was the team captain for a time.
