= Samir Beloufa =

Algerian footballer (born 1979)

Personal information
- Date of birth: 27 August 1979 (age 47)
- Place of birth: Melun, France
- Height: 1.80 m (5 ft 11 in)
- Position: Centre-back

Senior career*
Years	Team	Apps	(Gls)
1996–1997	Cannes B	6	(0)
1997–2000	AC Milan	3	(0)
1998–2000	→ Monza (loan)	12	(0)
2000–2002	Germinal Beerschot	46	(1)
2002–2003	Bastia B	12	(0)
2002–2003	Bastia	1	(0)
2003–2005	Mouscron	52	(0)
2005–2007	Westerlo	16	(0)
2007–2008	Helsingborg	15	(1)
2009–2010	ROC Charleroi-Marchienne	8	(0)
Total		171	(2)

International career
2004–2006	Algeria	9	(0)
- * Club domestic league appearances and goals

Samir Beloufa (Arabic: سمير بلوفة; born 27 August 1979) is a former professional footballer who played as a centre-back. Born in France, he represented Algeria at international level.

== Club career ==
Beloufa played in the Italian Serie A he played for AC Milan, and Monza in Serie B. He also played with Mouscron and Germinal Beerschot in Belgium.

Beloufa transferred to Helsingborg from Belgian club Westerlo in March 2007. In November 2008, his contract with Helsingborg was not extended and he was released.

== International career ==
Beloufa made nine appearances for the Algeria national team since 2004. He was part of the Algerian 2004 African Nations Cup team, who finished second in their group in the first round of competition before being defeated by Morocco in the quarter-finals.

== Career statistics ==
=== International ===
National team	Year	Apps	Goals
Algeria	2004	7	0
Algeria	2005	1	0
Algeria	2006	1	0
Total		9	0

== Honours ==
AC Milan

- Torneo di Viareggio 1999
