= Christoffer Andersson =

Swedish footballer

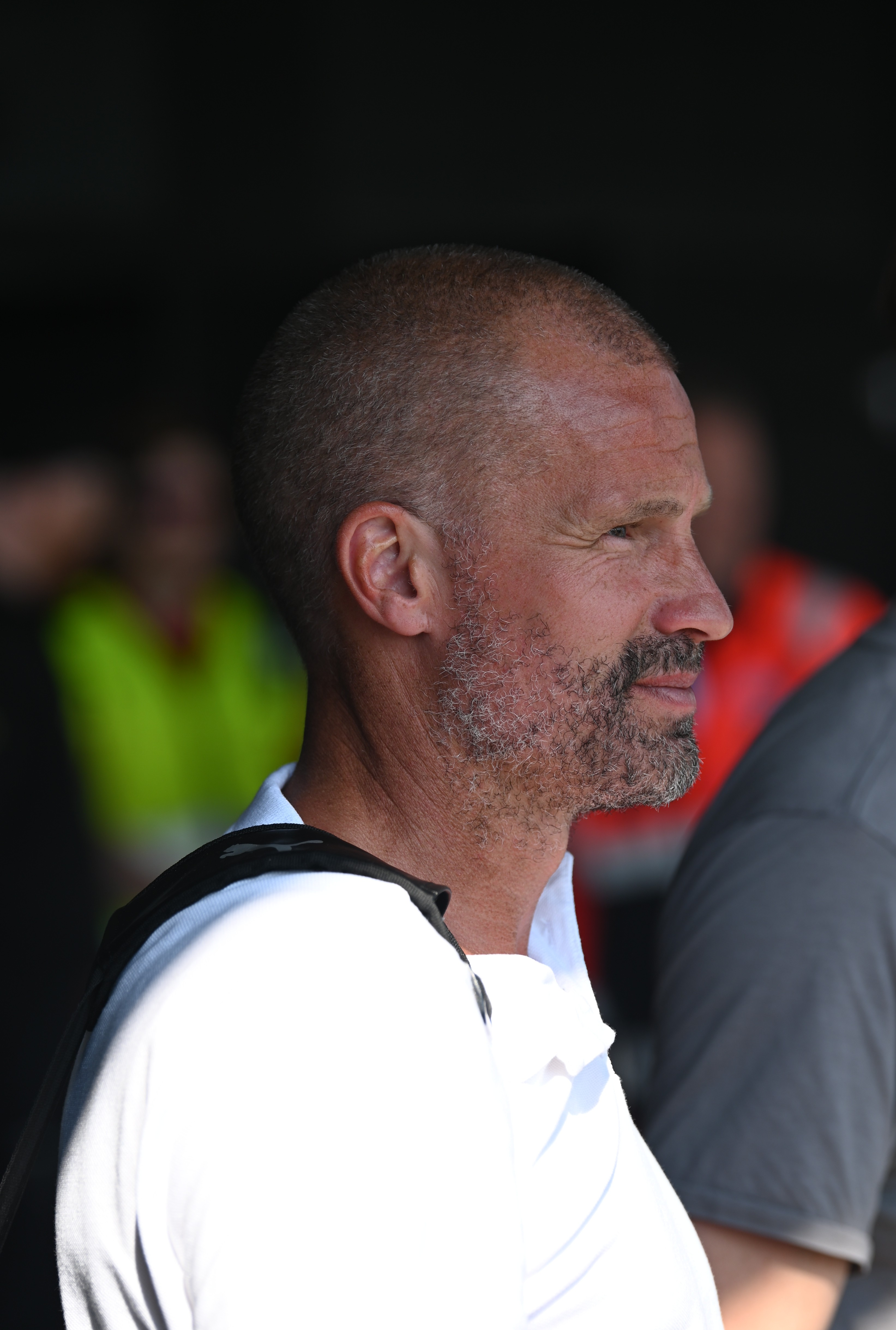

Personal information
- Full name: Christoffer Tobias Andersson
- Date of birth: 22 October 1978 (age 48)
- Place of birth: Nybro, Sweden
- Height: 1.73 m (5 ft 8 in)
- Positions: Defender; midfielder

Team information
- Current team: Falkenbergs FF (Manager)

Youth career
- 1984–1996: Nybro IF
- 1997: Helsingborgs IF

Senior career*
Years	Team	Apps	(Gls)
1998–2003	Helsingborgs IF	148	(11)
2004–2006	Lillestrøm SK	63	(3)
2006–2007	Hannover 96	7	(0)
2007–2014	Helsingborgs IF	171	(29)
2015	Halmstads BK	27	(2)
2016	Helsingborgs IF	7	(0)
Total		423	(45)

International career
1996	Sweden U19	10	(1)
1998–2000	Sweden U21	14	(0)
2000–2006	Sweden	24	(0)

Managerial career
- 2016: Helsingborgs IF U17
- 2017–2019: Helsingborgs IF (assistant)
- 2019: Eskilsminne IF (assistant)
- 2019–2021: Hittarps IK (sporting director)
- 2022–: Falkenbergs FF
- * Club domestic league appearances and goals

Christoffer Tobias Andersson (born 22 October 1978) is a Swedish former professional football player who played as a defender and midfielder. He is best remembered for his time with Helsingborgs IF for which he played more than 500 official games, but also represented Lillestrøm SK, Hannover 96, and Halmstads BK during a career that spanned between 1998 and 2016. A full international between 2000 and 2006, he won 24 caps for the Sweden national team.

== Club career ==
=== Helsingborgs IF ===
Andersson started off his career with Nybro IF before signing for Helsingborgs IF in 1996. During his first season with the club he helped the team win the 1997–98 Svenska Cupen. The following year, he was part of the Helsingborg team that won the 1999 Allsvenskan. In 2000, he played a vital part in Helsingborg qualifying for the 2000–01 UEFA Champions League, by scoring a goal in a second round aggregate win against BATE Borisov, and then playing in all 180 minutes as Helsingborg eliminated the Serie A club Inter Milan in the third round. In the group stage, Andersson played in five games as Helsingborg finished last in Group F behind Bayern Munich, Paris Saint-Germain, and Rosenborg. In 2001, Andersson was selected as Årets HIF:are (Helsingborg player of the year).

=== Lillestrøm SK ===
In January 2004, Andersson left Helsingborgs IF on a free transfer and signed a three-year contract with the Norwegian outfit Lillestrøm SK.

=== Hannover 96 ===
After 2.5 years in Norway, Andersson signed with the German Bundesliga team Hannover 96. However, Andersson struggled to receive playing time in Germany and only represented the club in 7 league games.

=== Return to Helsingborgs IF ===
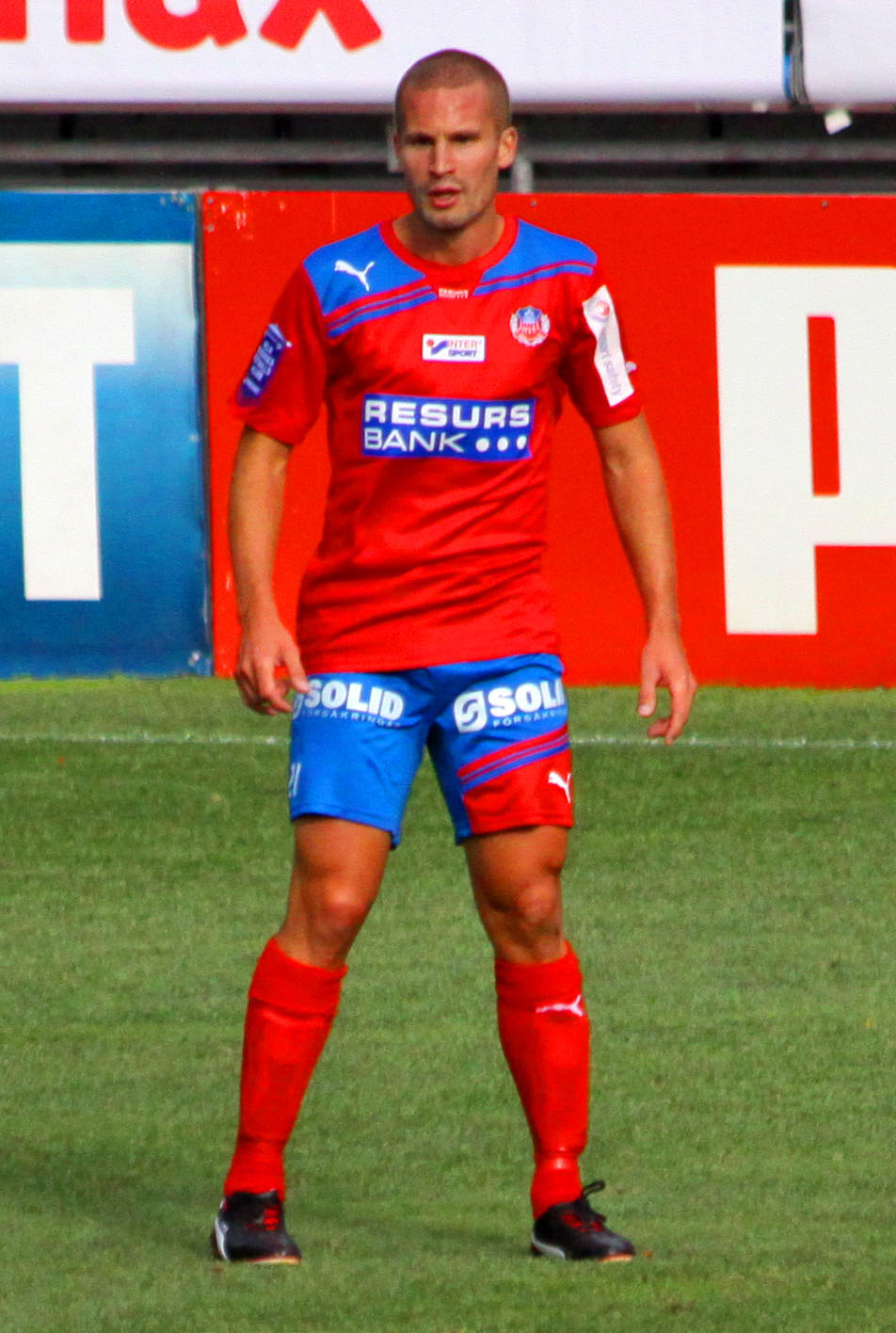
Andersson playing for Helsingborg in 2012.

In the summer of 2007, Andersson returned to Helsingborgs IF after three years abroad. Andersson had an immediate impact on the team and was an instrumental part of the Helsingborg team that reached the Round of 32 of the 2007–08 UEFA Cup after finishing second in Group H behind Bordeaux but ahead of Galatasaray, Panionios, and Austria Wien, and eliminating Hereenveen in the qualifying stage. Andersson scored the winning goal in the 2–3 away victory against Galatasaray. In 2008, Andersson was yet again named Årets HIF:are.

Andersson won multiple silverware with Helsingborg during his second stint, winning the 2010 and 2011 Svenska Cupen titles, the 2011 Allsvenskan title, as well as the 2011 and 2012 Svenska Supercupen titles.

=== Halmstads BK ===
Ahead of the 2015 Allsvenskan season, Andersson signed for Halmstads BK.

=== Second return to Helsingborgs IF and retirement ===
For the 2016 Allsvenskan season, Andersson yet again returned to Helsingborgs IF. Andersson retired at the end of the season after having a played a total of 350 Allsvenskan games, which is a club record, as well as more than 500 official games for the club.

== International career ==
Andersson represented the Sweden U19 and U21 teams before making his full international debut for Sweden on 31 January 2000 in a friendly 1–0 win against Denmark, coming on as a substitute for Roland Nilsson in the 74th minute.

He played in the qualifying campaigns for the 2002 FIFA World Cup, UEFA Euro 2004, and the 2006 FIFA World Cup, but did not make the final squad for Sweden in any of the tournaments.

Andersson won his 24th and last international cap in a friendly game against Ireland on 1 March 2006.

== Coaching career ==
In 2016, Andersson coached the U17 team of Helsingborgs IF. In November 2016, Andersson was appointed assistant manager of the first team of the club under manager Per-Ola Ljung. After 2,5 years as assistant manager, the club announced on 18 June 2019, that he had left the club following the appointment of new manager Henrik Larsson.

After a brief spell as assistant coach at Eskilsminne IF, he was later appointed sporting director at Hittarps IK in September 2019.

On 14 January 2022, Andersson was announced as the new manager of Falkenbergs FF.

== Career statistics ==
=== International ===
Appearances and goals by national team and year

National team	Year	Apps	Goals
Sweden	2000	1	0
Sweden	2001	10	0
Sweden	2002	1	0
Sweden	2003	5	0
Sweden	2004	1	0
Sweden	2005	3	0
Sweden	2006	3	0
Total		24	0

== Honours ==
Helsingborgs IF

- Allsvenskan: 1999, 2011
- Svenska Cupen: 1997–98, 2010, 2011
- Svenska Supercupen: 2011, 2012

Sweden

- King's Cup: 2003

Individual

- Årets HIF:are : 2001, 2008
