= Tony Mahr =

Swedish footballer

Tony Mahr (born January 8, 1986, in Helsingborg) is a Swedish football player who has played for Helsingborgs IF most of his adult life. He is a left wing full-back and has made 31 caps for Sweden at different youth levels. He made his debut for Helsingborg on 17 July 2006 as an 85th-minute substitute against BK Häcken. Having problem to take a place in the Helsingborg team. He 2007 signed for the Superettan team Assyriska FF, who he 2008 left for the Division 2 team Ramlösa Södra FF.

== Career ==
Helsingborgs IF -2007, Assyriska FF 2007-2008, Ramlösa Södra FF 2008-
