= 1999 Torneo di Viareggio =

1999 Torneo Mondiale di Calcio Coppa Carnevale
51° Torneo di Viareggio

Tournament details
- Host country: Italy
- City: Viareggio
- Dates: February 1, 1999 - February 15, 1999
- Teams: 32

Final positions
- Champions: (Italy) Milan
- Runners-up: (Croatia) Varteks
- Third place: (Italy) Udinese
- Fourth place: (Italy) Lazio

Tournament statistics
- Matches played: 64
- Goals scored: 162 (2.53 per match)

The 1999 winners of the Torneo di Viareggio (in English, the Viareggio Tournament, officially the Viareggio Cup World Football Tournament Coppa Carnevale), the annual youth football tournament held in Viareggio, Tuscany, are listed below.

== Format ==
The 32 teams are seeded in 8 groups. Each team from a group meets the others in a single tie. The winning club and runners-up from each group progress to the final knockout stage. All matches in the final rounds are single tie. The Round of 16 envisions penalties and no extra time, while the rest of the final round matches include 30 minutes extra time and penalties to be played if the draw between teams still holds. Semifinal losing teams play 3rd-place final with penalties after regular time. The winning sides play the final with extra time and repeat the match if the draw holds.

== Participating teams ==
Italian teams

- (Italy) Bari
- (Italy) Cagliari
- (Italy) Como
- (Italy) Empoli
- (Italy) Fiorentina
- (Italy) Genoa
- (Italy) Inter Milan
- (Italy) Juventus
- (Italy) Lazio
- (Italy) Milan
- (Italy) Napoli
- (Italy) Parma
- (Italy) Perugia
- (Italy) Roma
- (Italy) Siena
- (Italy) Torino
- (Italy) Udinese

European teams

- (Germany) Bayern München
- (Germany) Werder Bremen
- (Croatia) Varteks
- (Portugal) Benfica

African teams

- (Ghana) Okwawu United

American teams

- (Mexico) Pumas
- (Argentina) Boca Juniors
- (Argentina) River Plate
- (Argentina) All Boys
- (Argentina) Central Córdoba
- (United States) Miami Breakers
- (Brazil) Vitória
- (Brazil) Comercial
- (Brazil) Irineu

Oceanian teams

- (Australia) Marconi Stallions

== Group stage ==
=== Group 1 ===
Team	Pts	Pld	W	D	L	GF	GA	GD
(Croatia) Varteks	7	3	2	1	0	5	2	+3
(Italy) Fiorentina	5	3	1	2	0	5	3	+2
(Argentina) Central Córdoba	3	3	1	0	2	1	3	-2
(Italy) Genoa	1	3	0	1	2	3	6	-3

=== Group 2 ===
Team	Pts	Pld	W	D	L	GF	GA	GD
(Italy) Bari	7	3	2	1	0	7	0	+7
(Australia) Club Marconi	4	3	1	1	1	3	5	-2
(Italy) Perugia	3	3	0	3	0	3	3	0
(Mexico) Pumas UNAM	1	3	0	1	2	1	6	-5

=== Group 3 ===
Team	Pts	Pld	W	D	L	GF	GA	GD
(Italy) Torino	7	3	2	1	0	5	1	+4
(Italy) Como	5	3	1	2	0	3	1	+2
(Argentina) Boca Juniors	4	3	1	1	1	4	1	+3
(Brazil) Comercial	0	3	0	0	3	0	9	-9

=== Group 4 ===
Team	Pts	Pld	W	D	L	GF	GA	GD
(Italy) Udinese	6	3	2	0	1	6	4	+2
(Italy) Inter	6	3	2	0	1	5	3	+2
(Italy) Siena	4	3	1	1	1	4	4	0
(Brazil) Irineu	1	3	0	1	2	1	5	-4

=== Group 5 ===
Team	Pts	Pld	W	D	L	GF	GA	GD
(Italy) Milan	7	3	2	1	0	9	1	+8
(Italy) Parma	7	3	2	1	0	8	2	+6
(Germany) Bayern München	3	3	1	0	2	2	7	-5
(United States) Miami Breakers	0	3	0	0	3	0	9	-9

=== Group 6 ===
Team	Pts	Pld	W	D	L	GF	GA	GD
(Italy) Empoli	5	3	1	2	0	3	2	+1
(Brazil) EC Vitória	4	3	1	1	1	4	4	0
(Italy) Napoli	4	3	1	1	1	3	3	0
(Argentina) River Plate	2	3	0	2	1	3	4	-1

=== Group 7 ===
Team	Pts	Pld	W	D	L	GF	GA	GD
(Germany) Werder Bremen	7	3	2	1	0	4	2	+2
(Italy) Roma	5	3	1	2	0	5	1	+4
(Argentina) All Boys	3	3	1	0	2	3	7	-4
(Italy) Cagliari	1	3	0	1	2	3	5	-2

=== Group 8 ===
Team	Pts	Pld	W	D	L	GF	GA	GD
(Italy) Lazio	9	3	3	0	0	9	0	+9
(Portugal) Benfica	6	3	2	0	1	3	2	+1
(Italy) Juventus	3	3	1	0	2	3	8	-5
(Ghana) Okwawu United	0	3	0	0	3	1	6	-5

== Knockout stage ==
Round of 16
(Australia) Club Marconi	1
(Croatia) Varteks	2
(Italy) Inter	0 [2]
(Italy) Torino (pen)	0 [3]
(Italy) Como	1 [4]
(Italy) Udinese (pen)	1 [5]
(Italy) Bari	2 [2]
(Italy) Fiorentina (pen)	2 [4]
(Italy) Lazio (pen)	1 [6]
(Italy) Roma	1 [5]
(Italy) Empoli	1
(Italy) Parma	2
(Italy) Milan	4
(Brazil) EC Vitória	0
(Portugal) Benfica	1
(Germany) Werder Bremen	2

Quarter-finals
(Croatia) Varteks	2
(Italy) Torino	1
(Italy) Udinese	2
(Italy) Fiorentina	1
(Italy) Lazio	2
(Italy) Parma	0
(Italy) Milan	2
(Germany) Werder Bremen	0

Semi-finals
(Croatia) Varteks	1
(Italy) Udinese	0
(Italy) Lazio	0
(Italy) Milan	1

Final
(Croatia) Varteks	0
(Italy) Milan	1
Third place
(Italy) Udinese	2
(Italy) Lazio	0

== Champions ==
Torneo di Viareggio 1999 Champions

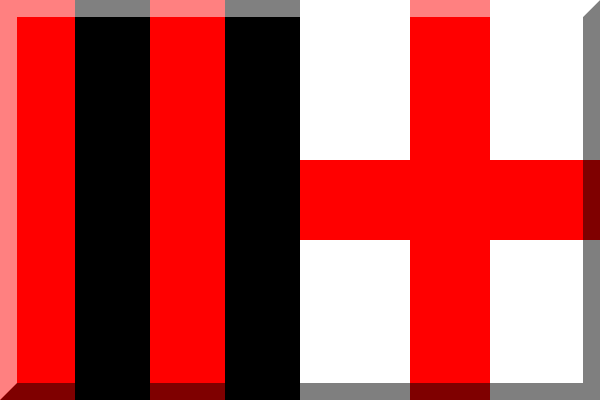

Milan
7th time
