= Hans Berggren =

Swedish former footballer

Personal information
- Date of birth: 18 February 1973 (age 53)
- Place of birth: Sweden
- Height: 1.87 m (6 ft 2 in)
- Position: Striker

Senior career*
Years	Team	Apps	(Gls)
1994–1998	Gefle IF	72	(32)
1998–1999	Hammarby IF	51	(19)
2000–2001	FK Haugesund	52	(25)
2002–2005	IF Elfsborg	96	(38)
2006–2007	BK Häcken	35	(7)
2008–2011	Gefle IF	31	(13)
Total		337	(134)
- * Club domestic league appearances and goals

Hans Berggren (born 18 February 1973) is a Swedish former footballer, who last played for Gefle IF.

He came to Gefle (the club where he started his elite career) in the beginning of 2008 from BK Häcken, and in the 2008 season, he became Gefle's best goalscorer with 11 goals. On 17 May 2011, Berggren announced his retirement from football due to longtime injuries. He played his last game on 26 May 2011, a goalless draw at home against Mjällby.

== Clubs ==
- Gefle IF 2008–2011
- BK Häcken 2006–2007
- IF Elfsborg 2002–2005
- FK Haugesund 2000–2001
- Hammarby IF 1998–1999
- Gefle IF 1994–1997
- Hamrånge GIF 1990–1993
