= Hittarps IK =

Swedish football club

- Full name: Hittarps Idrottsklubb
- Founded: 1959
- Ground: Laröds IP; Helsingborg; Sweden
- Chairman: Mats-Ola Schulze
- Head coach: Max Mölder
- League: Division 2 Västra Götaland
- 2019: Division 2 Västra Götaland, 13th
Home colours	Away colours

Hittarps IK is a Swedish football club located in Helsingborg.

== Background ==
Hittarps IK currently plays in Division 2 Skåne Nordvästra which is the fourth tier of Swedish football. They play their home matches at the Laröds IP in Helsingborg.

The club is affiliated to Skånes Fotbollförbund. The attendance record at Laröds IP was set on 24 June 1987 when 2,117 spectators attended the Division 2 Västra match with Helsingborgs IF.

== Season to season ==
In their most successful period Hittarps IK competed in the following divisions:

Season	Level	Division	Section	Position	Movements
1981	Tier 4	Division 4	Skåne Nordvästra	1st	Promoted
1982	Tier 3	Division 3	Sydvästra Götaland	4th	
1983	Tier 3	Division 3	Skåne	4th	
1984	Tier 3	Division 3	Skåne	9th	
1985	Tier 3	Division 3	Sydvästra Götaland	7th	
1986	Tier 3	Division 3	Sydvästra Götaland	4th	
1987*	Tier 3	Division 2	Västra	12th	Relegated
1988	Tier 4	Division 3	Sydvästra Götaland	4th	
1989	Tier 4	Division 3	Sydvästra Götaland	6th	

* League restructuring in 1987 resulted in a new division being created at Tier 2 and subsequent divisions dropping a level.

In recent seasons Hittarps IK have competed in the following divisions:

Season	Level	Division	Section	Position	Movements
2006*	Tier 7	Division 5	Skåne Västra	6th	
2007	Tier 7	Division 5	Skåne Nordvästra	3rd	Promotion Playoffs
2008	Tier 7	Division 5	Skåne Nordvästra	1st	Promoted
2009	Tier 6	Division 4	Skåne Västra	11th	Relegated
2010	Tier 7	Division 5	Skåne Nordvästra	1st	Promoted
2011	Tier 6	Division 4	Skåne Nordvästra	8th	
2012	Tier 6	Division 4	Skåne Nordvästra	1st	Promoted
2013	Tier 5	Division 3	Sydvästra Götaland	3rd	
2014	Tier 5	Division 3	Södra Götaland	4th	
2015	Tier 5	Division 3	Södra Götaland	4th	
2016	Tier 5	Division 3	Sydvästra Götaland	1st	Promoted
2017	Tier 4	Division 2	Västra Götaland	6th	
2018	Tier 4	Division 2	Västra Götaland	4th	

* League restructuring in 2006 resulted in a new division being created at Tier 3 and subsequent divisions dropping a level.

== Attendances ==
In recent seasons Hittarps IK have had the following average attendances:

Season	Average attendance	Division / Section	Level
2016	181	Div 3 Sydvästra Götaland	Tier 5
2017	226	Div 2 Västra Götaland	Tier 4
2018	205	Div 2 Västra Götaland	Tier 4

* Attendances are provided in the Publikliga sections of the Svenska Fotbollförbundet website.
