= Patrik Åström =

Swedish footballer

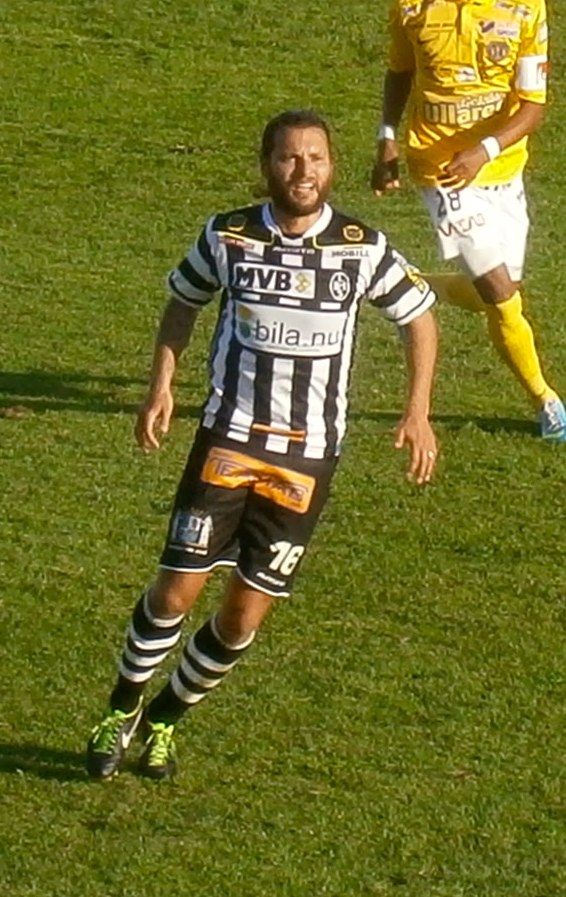
- Åström in a league game for Landskrona against Falkenbergs FF in 2013.

Personal information
- Full name: Patrik Joakim Åström
- Date of birth: August 28, 1987 (age 39)
- Place of birth: Helsingborg, Sweden
- Height: 1.82 m (6 ft 0 in)
- Position: Midfielder

Team information
- Current team: Hittarps IK

Youth career
- Ödåkra IF

Senior career*
Years	Team	Apps	(Gls)
2006–2008	Helsingborgs IF	3	(0)
2008–2010	Ängelholms FF	38	(4)
2010–2013	Landskrona BoIS	75	(6)
2014	Trelleborgs FF	16	(0)
2015	Ängelholms FF	3	(0)
2016	Eskilsminne IF	22	(3)
2017	Fortuna FF	?	(?)
2018–	Hittarps IK	9	(2)
- * Club domestic league appearances and goals as of 1 January 2016

Patrik Åström (born 28 August 1987) is a Swedish football player who plays as a midfielder for Hittarps IK. He has also played for Landskrona BoIS between 2010 and 2013. Prior to signing for BoIS, he played for the local rivals Helsingborgs IF and Ängelholms FF.
