= Daniel Westlin =

Swedish footballer

Personal information
- Date of birth: 24 January 1980 (age 46)
- Height: 1.82 m (6 ft 0 in)
- Position: Striker

Senior career*
Years	Team	Apps	(Gls)
2001–2002	IFK Göteborg		
2003–2010	Gefle IF		
- * Club domestic league appearances and goals

Daniel Westlin (born 24 January 1980) is a Swedish retired football striker.
