= Tobias Holmqvist =

Swedish footballer

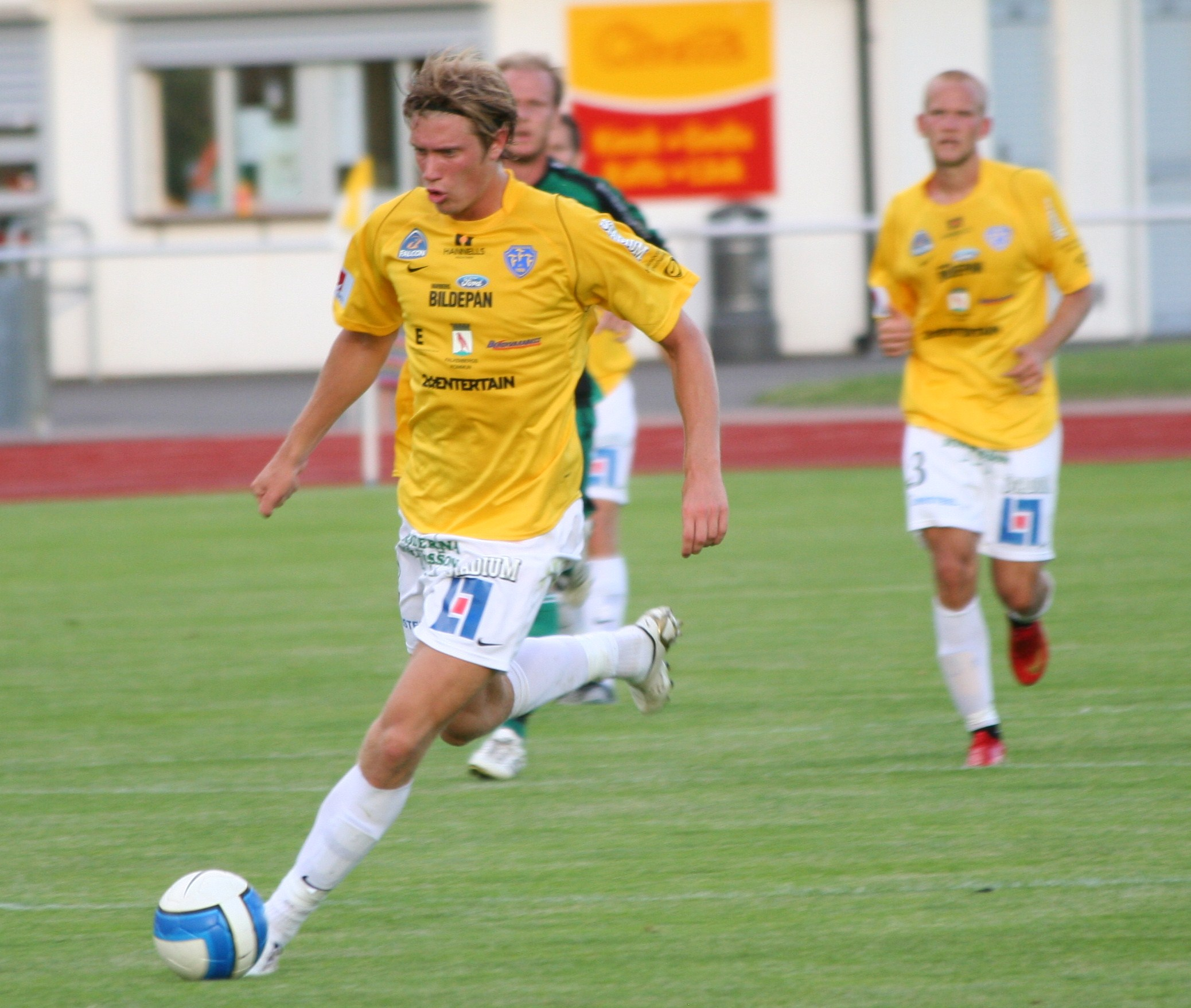
- Holmqvist playing for Falkenberg in 2008.

Personal information
- Date of birth: 23 January 1988 (age 38)
- Height: 1.95 m (6 ft 5 in)
- Position: Striker

Youth career
- 1994–2001: Uppåkra
- 2002–2006: Helsingborg

Senior career*
Years	Team	Apps	(Gls)
2007–2010	Helsingborg	8	(2)
2007	→ GAIS (loan)	10	(1)
2008	→ Falkenberg (loan)	9	(0)
2009	→ GAIS (loan)	2	(0)
2010	Hammarby	19	(1)
2011	Lund	22	(1)
2015	Högaborg		
- * Club domestic league appearances and goals as of 09:01, 21 June 2015 (UTC)

Tobias Holmqvist (born 23 January 1988) is a Swedish former footballer who played as a striker.

== Career ==
Holmqvist played for Uppåkra between the ages of 6 and 13, before joining Helsingborg in January 2002. While with Helsingborg he spent loan spells at GAIS and Falkenberg. GAIS had wanted to sign Holmqvist on a permanent contract, but he elected to remain at Helsingborg as it was his boyhood club. He dropped down a division to sign for Hammarby in 2010 on the advice of his agent, in order to make more first-team appearances, taking a pay cut in the process. The next season, he dropped down a division again to sign for Lund, motivated in part due to homesickness. In 2012, he did not have a club, and instead worked at Team Sportia, a sports shop in Helsingborg. In 2015, he was playing for Högaborg in the Swedish fourth division.
