= Olivier Karekezi =

Rwandan footballer

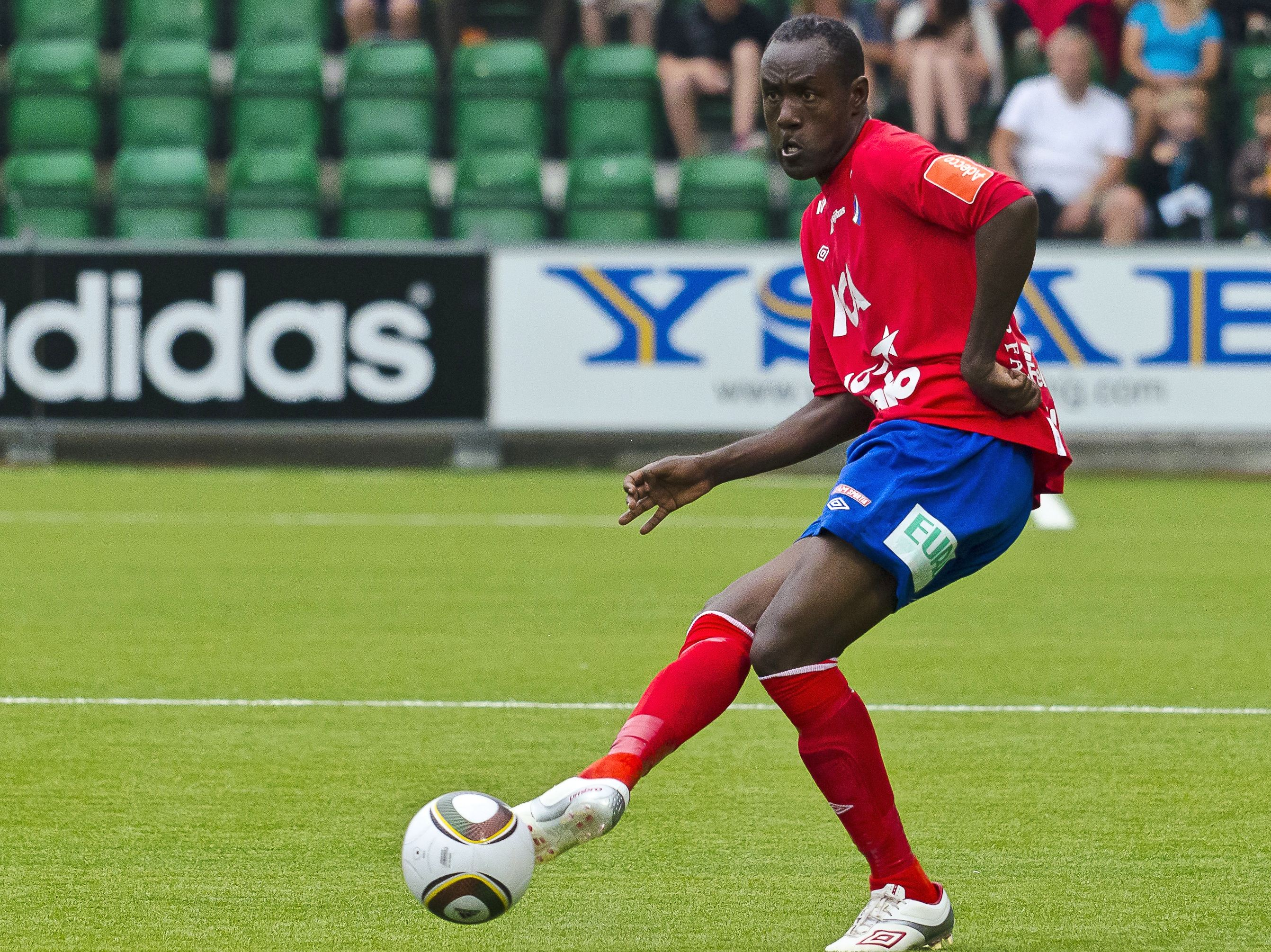
- Karekezi playing for Östers IF in 2011

Personal information
- Full name: Fils Olivier Karekezi
- Date of birth: 25 May 1983 (age 43)
- Place of birth: Kigali, Rwanda
- Height: 1.88 m (6 ft 2 in)
- Position: Forward

Youth career
- 1989–2001: APR

Senior career*
| Years | Team | Apps | (Gls) |
| 2002–2004 | APR | | |
| 2005–2007 | Helsingborgs IF | 60 | (18) |
| 2008–2009 | Hamarkameratene | 32 | (6) |
| 2010–2011 | Östers IF | 49 | (6) |
| 2011–2012 | APR | | (14) |
| 2012–2013 | CA Bizertin | 7 | (1) |
| 2014 | Trelleborgs FF | 15 | (4) |
| 2015–2017 | Råå IF | 42 | (15) |
| 2018–2019 | Råå IF | 28 | (12) |

International career
| 2000–2013 | Rwanda | 68 | (21) |

Managerial career
- 2017–2018: Rayon Sports
- * Club domestic league appearances and goals

Fils Olivier Karekezi (Kinyarwanda pronunciation: [olivje kaɾeˌcezi]; born 25 May 1983) is a Rwandan former professional footballer who played as a forward. He is also a former captain of the Rwanda national team.

== Club career ==
Karekezi signed for Helsingborgs IF in 2005, leaving his native club APR FC, and scored five goals in 18 matches during the 2005 season. In 2006, he scored 11 goals for Helsingborg and thereby became their top scorer in Allsvenskan. In January 2008 he transferred to Hamarkameratene. In March 2010 he joined the Swedish second division club, Östers IF on a two-year deal.

Karekezi took a pay cut to play for his former club APR. Having previously got US$52,000 (Rwf30.9m) a year at Swedish second division side Östers IF, he agreed a two-year deal with APR in the region of US$24, 000 (Rwf14m) a year.

Towards the end of September 2012, he joined Tunisian Ligue Professionnelle 1 club CA Bizertin in a two-year deal. In July 2013, he announced that he would retire from football when his contract with Bizertin expired in March 2015. However, he joined Swedish third-tier outfit Trelleborgs FF on 22 January 2014.

Karekezi spent two-and-a-half seasons with Swedish side Råå IF in Division 3 Södra Götaland. He returned to the club in March 2018, eight months after he had left Råå IF.

== International career ==
Karekezi made his debut for the Rwanda national team on 31 July 1999 in a CECAFA Cup match against Uganda. He scored his first international goal on 8 December 2001 in a match against Somalia.

Karekezi participated in the 2004 Africa Cup of Nations, held in Tunisia. It was Rwanda's first appearance in the Africa Cup of Nations finals. He featured in the group-stage matches against Tunisia and Guinea, as well as the match against the DR Congo.

After 13 years with the Rwanda national team, Karekezi announced his retirement from international football in late August 2013, stating that it was time to give younger players an opportunity.

== Career statistics ==
Scores and results list Rwanda's goal tally first, score column indicates score after each Karekezi goal.

List of international goals scored by Olivier Karekezi
| No. | Date | Venue | Opponent | Score | Result | Competition |
|---|---|---|---|---|---|---|
| 1 | 8 December 2001 | Stade Amahoro, Kigali, Rwanda | Somalia | 3–0 | 3–0 | 2001 CECAFA Cup |
| 2 | 13 October 2002 | Accra Sports Stadium, Accra, Ghana | Ghana | 1–0 | 2–4 | 2004 African Cup of Nations qualification |
| 3 | 3 December 2002 | Sheikh Amri Abeid Memorial Stadium, Arusha, Tanzania | Somalia | 1–0 | 1–0 | 2002 CECAFA Cup |
| 4 | 12 October 2003 | Stade Amahoro, Kigali, Rwanda | Namibia | 2–0 | 3–0 | 2006 FIFA World Cup qualification |
| 5 | 2 December 2003 | Khartoum Stadium, Khartoum, Sudan | Zanzibar | 1–0 | 2–2 | 2003 CECAFA Cup |
| 6 | 2 December 2003 | Khartoum Stadium, Khartoum, Sudan | Zanzibar | 2–1 | 2–2 | 2003 CECAFA Cup |
| 7 | 14 August 2004 | Kampala, Uganda | Uganda | ?–? | 2–1 | Friendly |
| 8 | 11 December 2004 | Addis Ababa Stadium, Addis Ababa, Ethiopia | Zanzibar | 2–1 | 4–2 | 2004 CECAFA Cup |
| 9 | 19 December 2004 | Addis Ababa Stadium, Addis Ababa, Ethiopia | Tanzania | ?–? | 5–1 | 2004 CECAFA Cup |
| 10 | 8 December 2005 | Stade Amahoro, Kigali, Rwanda | Uganda | 1–0 | 1–0 | 2005 CECAFA Cup |
| 11 | 8 October 2006 | Antoinette Tubman Stadium, Monrovia, Liberia | Liberia | 1–2 | 2–3 | 2008 Africa Cup of Nations qualification |
| 12 | 25 March 2007 | Estadio Internacional, Malabo, Equatorial Guinea | Equatorial Guinea | 1–1 | 1–3 | 2008 Africa Cup of Nations qualification |
| 13 | 8 September 2007 | Stade Amahoro, Kigali, Rwanda | Liberia | 4–0 | 4–0 | 2008 Africa Cup of Nations qualification |
| 14 | 13 December 2007 | Benjamin Mkapa National Stadium, Dar es Salaam, Tanzania | Djibouti | 1–0 | 9–0 | 2007 CECAFA Cup |
| 15 | 13 December 2007 | Benjamin Mkapa National Stadium, Dar es Salaam, Tanzania | Djibouti | 9–0 | 9–0 | 2007 CECAFA Cup |
| 16 | 31 May 2008 | Stade Régional Nyamirambo, Kigali, Rwanda | Mauritania | 1–0 | 3–0 | 2010 FIFA World Cup qualification |
| 17 | 8 June 2008 | Addis Ababa Stadium, Addis Ababa, Ethiopia | Ethiopia | 2–1 | 2–1 | 2010 FIFA World Cup qualification |
| 18 | 14 June 2008 | Stade Régional Nyamirambo, Kigali, Rwanda | Morocco | 3–1 | 3–1 | 2010 FIFA World Cup qualification |
| 19 | 15 November 2011 | Stade Amahoro, Kigali, Rwanda | Eritrea | 1–0 | 3–1 | 2014 FIFA World Cup qualification |
| 20 | 26 November 2011 | Benjamin Mkapa National Stadium, Dar es Salaam, Tanzania | Tanzania | 1–0 | 1–0 | 2011 CECAFA Cup |
| 21 | 2 December 2011 | Benjamin Mkapa National Stadium, Dar es Salaam, Tanzania | Djibouti | 3–2 | 5–2 | 2011 CECAFA Cup |
| 22 | 2 December 2011 | Benjamin Mkapa National Stadium, Dar es Salaam, Tanzania | Djibouti | 4–2 | 5–2 | 2011 CECAFA Cup |
| 23 | 2 December 2011 | Benjamin Mkapa National Stadium, Dar es Salaam, Tanzania | Djibouti | 5–2 | 5–2 | 2011 CECAFA Cup |
| 24 | 8 December 2011 | Benjamin Mkapa National Stadium, Dar es Salaam, Tanzania | Sudan | 2–1 | 2–1 | 2011 CECAFA Cup |
