= Mathias Unkuri =

Swedish footballer

Personal information
- Full name: Mathias Robin Unkuri
- Date of birth: January 16, 1988 (age 38)
- Place of birth: Perstorp, Sweden
- Position: Midfielder

Youth career
- 1993–2004: Perstorps SK
- 2005–2006: Helsingborgs IF

Senior career*
Years	Team	Apps	(Gls)
2007–2009	Helsingborgs IF	43	(2)
2009	Ängelholms FF	11	(1)
2010–2012	Landskrona BoIS	24	(1)
2012	Hobro IK	5	(0)
2013–2014	Nybergsund	40	(3)
2015–	Eskilsminne IF		

International career^{‡}
2007–2009	Sweden u-21	3	(0)
- * Club domestic league appearances and goals as of 2 August 2012 ‡ National team caps and goals as of 00:29, 19 June 2009 (UTC)

Mathias Unkuri (born 16 January 1988) is a Swedish footballer.

He has played in Norway with Nybergsund (Note: Mathias Unkuri at the Norwegian Football Federation (in Norwegian)) and Denmark with Hobro IK.
