= Oscar Berglund =

Swedish footballer

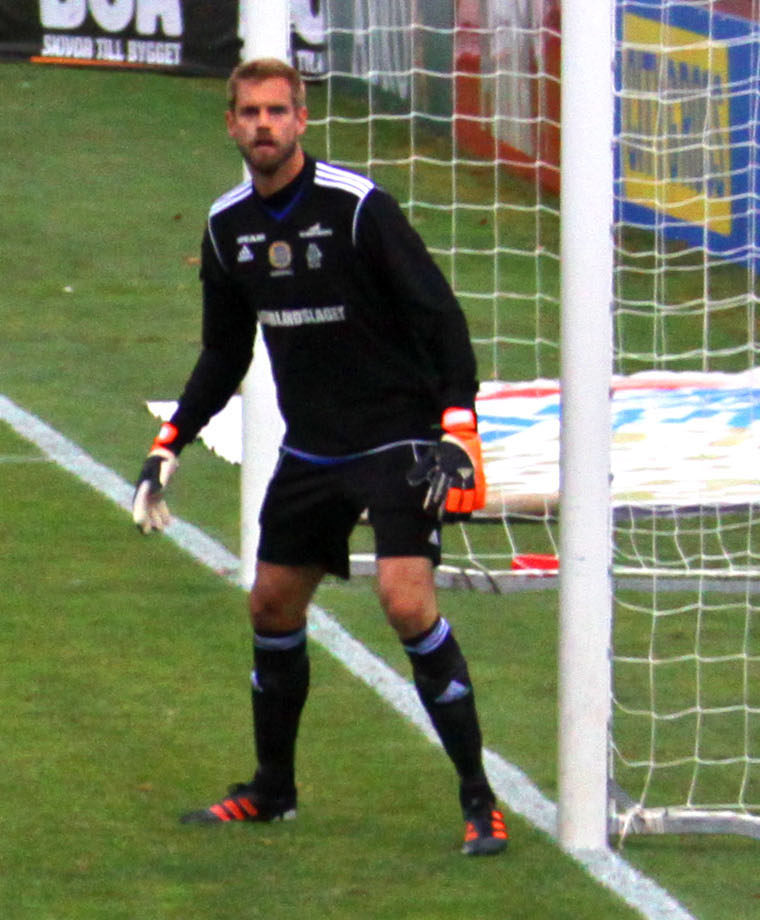

Personal information
- Full name: Erik Oscar Berglund
- Date of birth: April 13, 1984 (age 42)
- Place of birth: Örebro, Sweden
- Height: 2.01 m (6 ft 7 in)
- Position: Goalkeeper

Team information
- Current team: Ängelholms FF
- Number: 1

Youth career
- 1990–2000: Adolfsbergs IK
- 2001–2004: Helsingborgs IF

Senior career*
Years	Team	Apps	(Gls)
2001–2012	Helsingborgs IF	3	(0)
2009	→ Assyriska FF (loan)	24	(0)
2011	→ Assyriska FF (loan)	29	(0)
2012–2014	GIF Sundsvall	47	(0)
2014	Östers IF	6	(0)
2015–	Ängelholms FF	0	(0)

International career^{‡}
2001	Sweden U17	3	(0)
2003	Sweden U19	10	(0)
2005	Sweden U21	3	(0)
- * Club domestic league appearances and goals as of 20 August 2013 ‡ National team caps and goals as of 20 August 2013

Oscar Berglund (born April 13, 1984 in Örebro) is a Swedish footballer who plays for Östers IF as a goalkeeper.

== Career ==
In Helsingborg Berglund was a reserve goalkeeper of Helsingborg behind unthreatened Pär Hansson. He made his Allsvenskan debut for the club on 8 October 2007 in an away match against Hammarby. Berglund joined Assyriska FF on loan in January 2009. Berglund transferred to GIF Sundsvall on 3 January 2012.
