= Yannick Bapupa =

Congolese former professional footballer

Personal information
- Full name: Ngabu Yannick Bapupa
- Date of birth: 21 January 1982 (age 44)
- Place of birth: Kinshasa, Zaire
- Height: 1.79 m (5 ft 10 in)
- Position: Midfielder

Senior career*
Years	Team	Apps	(Gls)
2002–2004	Djurgårdens IF	42	(3)
2005	Åtvidabergs FF	24	(6)
2006–2009	Gefle IF	92	(12)
2010	Kalmar FF	0	(0)
2012–2013	AFC United	32	(3)

International career
2008–2009	DR Congo	5	(0)
- * Club domestic league appearances and goals

Ngabu Yannick Bapupa (born 21 January 1982) is a Congolese former professional footballer who played as a midfielder. He won five caps with the DR Congo national team.

== Imprisonment ==
In April 2010, Bapupa was sentenced to serve two years in prison for a rape he committed during autumn 2009 in Sweden when celebrating the newly signed contract with Kalmar FF. On 7 June 2011, Bapupa had served two thirds of the time and was conditionally released.

== International career ==
Bapupa earned his first cap for DR Congo national football team against Gabon on 25 March 2008.

== Honours ==
=== Club ===
Djurgårdens IF

- Allsvenskan (2): 2002, 2003
- Svenska Cupen (2): 2002, 2004
