= Paulinho Guará =

Brazilian footballer-manager

Personal information
- Full name: Paulo Roberto Chamon de Castilho
- Date of birth: 29 August 1979 (age 47)
- Place of birth: Sete Lagoas, Brazil
- Height: 1.82 m (6 ft 0 in)
- Position: Forward

Team information
- Current team: Valério (manager)

Senior career*
| Years | Team | Apps | (Gls) |
| 2002 | Atlético Mineiro | 0 | (0) |
| 2002–2005 | Örgryte IS | 85 | (33) |
| 2005–2008 | Hammarby IF | 72 | (27) |
| 2008 | → Busan I'Park (loan) | 3 | (2) |
| 2009–2010 | Busan I'Park | 4 | (0) |
| 2010 | → Örebro SK (loan) | 27 | (5) |
| 2011 | Hammarby IF | 26 | (3) |
| 2012 | Naval | 13 | (2) |
| 2012–2013 | Naval | | |
| 2013 | → Arapongas (loan) | | (0) |
| 2013 | Coruripe | 0 | (0) |
| 2014 | Tigres do Brasil | 0 | (0) |
| 2015 | Duque de Caxias | 8 | (5) |
| 2016 | Sampaio Corrêa | | |
| 2019 | Democrata | | |

Managerial career
- 2019: Democrata (player-manager)
- 2023: Democrata
- 2023: Nacional-MG
- 2023: SC Aymorés
- 2023–: Valério
- * Club domestic league appearances and goals

Paulo Roberto Chamon de Castilho, known as Paulinho Guará (born 29 August 1979) is a Brazilian football coach and a former player who is the manager of Valério.

== Career ==
Paulo began his professional career with Örgryte IS, where he played from 2002 to 2005. On 19 August 2005, he signed a four-year contract with Hammarby IF during the 2005 season.In the summer of 2008, he was loaned to South Korean club Busan I'Park for one season. He then signed a contract with Busan I'Park. On 19 May 2010, Örebro SK loaned Paulo for the rest of the 2010 season. On 9 February 2011 it was announced that he had signed with Hammarby IF for one year. After one season with the club, he joined the Portuguese second division, Liga de Honra side Naval in January 2012. By 2015 Paulinho was playing for Tigres do Brasil, a smaller club based in Rio de Janeiro.
