= René Makondele =

Congolese footballer

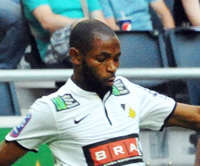
- Makondele in 2013

Personal information
- Full name: René Muzola Makondele
- Date of birth: 20 April 1982 (age 44)
- Place of birth: Kinshasa, Zaire
- Height: 1.75 m (5 ft 9 in)
- Position: Winger

Youth career
- Kinshasa City

Senior career*
Years	Team	Apps	(Gls)
2002–2005	Djurgårdens IF	44	(5)
2005	→ Gefle IF (loan)	20	(2)
2006–2007	Gefle IF	41	(10)
2007–2010	Helsingborgs IF	70	(17)
2010–2016	BK Häcken	162	(42)
2017	Gefle IF	18	(2)
2018	Sandvikens IF	25	(2)
Total		380	(80)

International career
2001–2009	DR Congo	6	(1)
- * Club domestic league appearances and goals

René Muzola Makondele (born 20 April 1982) is a Congolese former professional footballer who played as a winger. He made six appearances DR Congo national team scoring once.

== Career ==
Born in Kinshasa, René Makondele started his career in DRC with Kinshasa City. He then was spotted by Swedish scouts from Djurgårdens IF who brought him to Sweden, alongside Yannick Bapupa and Blaise Mbemba. During his time in Djurgårdens IF he mostly came on as a substitute, and in 2005 he was loaned out to Allsvenskan rivals Gefle IF. He impressed Gefle manager Per Olsson enough for Gefle to buy him from Djurgården. He stayed with the club for another year and a half, when Helsingborgs IF signed him in the middle of the 2007 season. Following a lack of playing time in 2010, Makondele decided to leave Helsingborgs IF. His previous clubs, Gefle IF and Djurgårdens IF, showed interest in him, but he rejected both. Instead he joined BK Häcken, signing a three-year contract which starts on 1 January 2011, however following a minor dispute between the two clubs over when Makondele would leave Helsingborg, an agreement was reached and Makondele left Helsingborgs IF in the 2010 summer instead.

In late 2016, Makondele rejoined Gefle for the 2017 season.

== Personal life ==
His cousin Guy-Guy Lema played alongside few years with him in Sweden and his other cousin Kuanzambi Barssabas da Cruz played a half-year for Torslanda IK.

== Honours ==
Djurgårdens IF

- Allsvenskan: 2002, 2003

BK Häcken

- Svenska Cupen: 2015-16
