= Ólafur Ingi Skúlason =

Icelandic footballer

Personal information
- Full name: Ólafur Ingi Skúlason
- Date of birth: 1 April 1983 (age 43)
- Place of birth: Reykjavík, Iceland
- Height: 1.84 m (6 ft 0 in)
- Position: Midfielder

Team information
- Current team: Breidablik (head coach)

Youth career
- Fylkir

Senior career*
Years	Team	Apps	(Gls)
2000–2001	Fylkir	20	(0)
2001–2005	Arsenal	0	(0)
2003	→ Fylkir (loan)	14	(1)
2005–2007	Brentford	16	(1)
2007–2009	Helsingborgs IF	37	(0)
2010–2011	SønderjyskE	41	(3)
2011–2015	Zulte Waregem	99	(6)
2015–2016	Gençlerbirliği	25	(0)
2016–2018	Karabükspor	41	(3)
2018–2020	Fylkir	39	(2)
Total		332	(16)

International career
1999	Iceland U17	9	(1)
2000–2001	Iceland U19	9	(0)
2002–2005	Iceland U21	12	(0)
2003–2018	Iceland	36	(1)

Managerial career
- 2021–: Iceland women's U15
- 2021–: Iceland U19
- * Club domestic league appearances and goals

Ólafur Ingi Skúlason (born 1 April 1983) is an Icelandic former professional footballer who played as a midfielder. He is the manager of Iceland national under-19 football team and the Iceland national under-15 women's team.

== Club career ==
Ólafur was born in Reykjavík, Iceland, where he played for Fylkir. After the Icelandic season had come to a close, he was looking for new employment, and found it with Arsenal on 1 July 2001. Ólafur was loaned back to Fylkir over a part of the 2003 season, and was voted the best young player in the Icelandic league 2003.

His Arsenal debut came on 2 December 2003 in a 5–1 defeat of Wolverhampton Wanderers, replacing Justin Hoyte after 55 minutes of the match. Ólafur was released by Arsenal on 28 May 2005. He signed for Brentford on 22 June 2005. Upon his arrival at Brentford, the club's website quoted him as saying: "I look at this as a very important move for my career, knowing that manager Martin Allen had been interested in signing me for a while was a huge compliment for me."

In the second game of the 2005–06 season, Ólafur suffered a cruciate and medial ligament injury resulting from a tackle with Chesterfield's Derek Niven, which ruled him out for the rest of the season. He was passed fit for the start of the 2006–07 season and completed his comeback by scoring the winner in a 1–0 win over Blackpool, the first game of the season. He signed for Helsingborgs IF on 21 February 2007. After three successful years in Helsingborg, Ólafur turned down a new contract offer and signed for Danish team SønderjyskE on 6 December 2009.

A year later Ólafur signed for Zulte Waregem in Belgium and stayed there for four years. He then plied his trade in Turkey for a few years before returning to Fylkir.

Ólafur returned to former club Fylkir in 2018.

== International career ==
Ólafur earned his first cap for Iceland in a friendly against Mexico on 20 November 2003 as a substitute, replacing Veigar Páll Gunnarsson. He has also captained their U21 team.

Although playing almost 30 international games for over ten years, Ólafur never quite managed to become a regular first team member of the Icelandic team. He was, however, a useful squad member and played three games as a substitute in Iceland's successful qualification for Euro 2016, including Iceland's famous win over the Netherlands in Amsterdam. He was not selected for Iceland's Euro 2016 team.

In May 2018 he was named in Iceland's 23-man squad for the 2018 World Cup in Russia.

== Career statistics ==
Appearances and goals by national team and year
National team	Year	Apps	Goals
Iceland	2003	1	0
Iceland	2004	0	0
Iceland	2005	1	0
Iceland	2006	1	0
Iceland	2007	2	0
Iceland	2008	1	0
Iceland	2009	3	1
Iceland	2010	5	0
Iceland	2011	1	0
Iceland	2012	1	0
Iceland	2013	4	0
Iceland	2014	3	0
Iceland	2015	2	0
Iceland	2016	1	0
Iceland	2017	5	0
Iceland	2018	4	0
Total		36	1

Scores and results list Iceland's goal tally first, score column indicates score after each Ólafur goal.

List of international goals scored by Ólafur Ingi Skúlason
No.	Date	Venue	Opponent	Score	Result	Competition
1	9 September 2009	Laugardalsvöllur, Reykjavík, Iceland	Georgia	2–0	3–1	Friendly
