= Razak Omotoyossi =

Nigerian-born Beninese footballer (1985–2025)

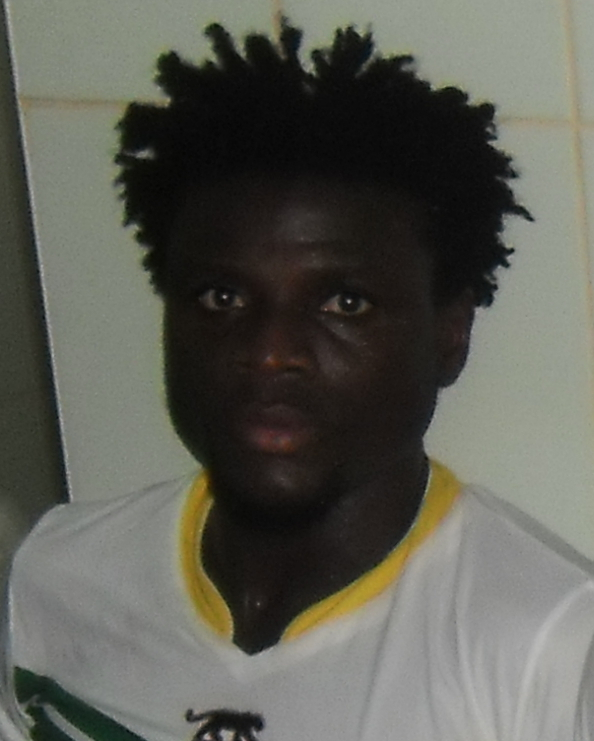
- Omotoyossi in 2014

Personal information
- Date of birth: 8 October 1985
- Place of birth: Lagos, Nigeria
- Date of death: 19 August 2025 (aged 39)
- Place of death: Nigeria
- Height: 1.77 m (5 ft 10 in)
- Position: Striker

Youth career
- 2001–2002: F.C. Ebedei
- 2002–2003: Sunshine Stars

Senior career*
| Years | Team | Apps | (Gls) |
| 2004 | Avrankou Omnispor | 12 | (3) |
| 2005 | JS Pobè | 20 | (2) |
| 2006–2007 | FC Sheriff | 38 | (17) |
| 2007–2008 | Helsingborg | 33 | (16) |
| 2008–2009 | Al-Nassr | 19 | (4) |
| 2009–2010 | Metz | 25 | (2) |
| 2010 | GAIS | 13 | (2) |
| 2011 | Syrianska | 6 | (1) |
| 2011–2013 | Zamalek | 22 | (4) |
| 2014 | Kahramanmaraşspor | 9 | (2) |
| 2014–2015 | KAC Kénitra | 7 | (1) |
| 2015 | Olympic Safi | 3 | (0) |
| 2015 | Al-Nahda | | |
| 2016–2017 | Hearts of Oak | | |
| 2019 | USS Kraké | | |
| 2019–2021 | JA Cotonou | | |

International career
| 2004–2016 | Benin | 55 | (21) |
- * Club domestic league appearances and goals

Razak Omotoyossi (8 October 1985 – 19 August 2025) was a Nigerian-born Beninese professional footballer who played as a striker for clubs in the Nigeria Premier Football League, Egyptian Premier League, Allsvenskan, Moroccan Botola Pro, Saudi Pro League and Ligue 1. Born in Nigeria, he played for the Benin national team. He is Benin's second-highest goalscorer, behind Stéphane Sessègnon with 21 goals in 47 appearances.

== Club career ==
=== Early career ===
Born in Lagos, Omotoyossi started his career in his native Nigeria, but was nearly derailed when the Nigeria Football Federation slammed a five-year ban on him for allegedly assaulting a referee during a Premier League game between his club, Sunshine Stars and visiting Enyimba. He had though already left to play in neighbouring Benin. He later switched to Beninese citizenship the same year.

He started his professional career in Benin with JS Pobè.

=== FC Sheriff ===
Omotoyossi signed for Moldovan side FC Sheriff in November 2005.

On 26 July 2006, he scored a 92nd minute equalizing goal for Sheriff against Spartak Moscow in the second qualifying round of the 2006–07 UEFA Champions League.

In March 2007 he went on trial with Israeli Premier League side Hapoel Kfar Saba. He scored in a Toto Cup game, but did not sign for them as he found the challenge of the Swedish Allsvenskan more promising.

=== Helsingborg ===
Omotoyossi signed for Helsingborgs IF in summer 2007. In the role of Henrik Larsson's strike partner, Omotoyossi finished the 2007 season as joint top scorer having scored 14 goals in 23 games.

In the 2007–08 UEFA Cup, he scored twice in the first two qualifying rounds. His first goal came in the first leg of the first qualifying round home win over Estonian Meistriliiga side Narva Trans on 19 July 2007, and he then scored in the second qualifying round, second leg, a 3–0 home win over League of Ireland Premier Division side Drogheda United. He added a further four goals in the group stage as Helsingborg finished second in Group H. Omotoyossi scored six goals in six matches: three goals against SC Heerenveen, two against Austria Wien and one against the Galatasaray which made him top scorer alongside teammate Henrik Larsson and Luca Toni of Bayern Munich. His six goals were critical in Helsingborgs booking their passage to the last 32. With six goals in a total of eight games, Omotoyossi finished as joint fourth top scorer in the tournament. Despite being a top-scorer in Helsingborg.

He also appeared that year in Italy's Guerin Sportivo as one of the world's top 50 stars for the very near future. This record caught the eye of Eredivisie side SC Heerenveen, and it was rumoured that they wanted the striker as a replacement for Brazilian striker Afonso Alves who was set to leave for English side Middlesbrough.

After the January transfer window had shut, it was revealed that Omotoyossi had declined a move to Dutch Eredivisie side, FC Groningen, in a deal that would have been worth $2.5 million.

=== Al-Nassr ===
In July 2008 Omotoyossi signed for Al-Nassr in Saudi Arabia for $3 million.

He had a short stint at the Arabian club in which he appeared in nine games, scoring four goals in the 2008–09 season as Al-Nassr finished 5th in the Saudi Professional League.

=== Metz ===
On 9 June 2009, Omotoyoissi signed a three-year contract with French Ligue 2 side FC Metz. He scored twice in 8 starts and 14 as a substitute player as Metz finished fourth in the 2009–10 season, just missing out on promotion to Ligue 1.

=== GAIS ===
On 30 March 2011, Swedish club GAIS confirmed that they had signed Omotoyossi, he was signed on a short-term contract until July.

=== Syrianska FC ===
On 21 July 2011, Omotoyossi signed a short-term contract with Syrianska FC where he only played 5 matches before leaving to Egypt's Zamalek SC.

=== Zamalek SC ===
On 15 September 2011, Omotoyossi signed a three-year contract with Egyptian club Zamalek SC. He made his debut for the team in a league match against El-Entag El-Harby.

=== Union Sportive Sèmè ===
After leaving Moroccan club Safi in 2015, Omotoyossi was without a club for four years, before signing for USS Kraké in February 2019.

== International career ==
Omotoyossi represented Benin at under-20 and full international levels.

On 10 June 2005, he scored in the group A match with Australia at the 2005 FIFA World Youth Championship in the Netherlands. The match ended in a 1–1 draw. It was Benin's first-ever goal at a world cup finals. "I always want to score goals, every time I go out on the pitch", he said at the time. On 7 February 2007, he scored in a 2–1 friendly defeat to Senegal in Rouen, France.

He played in the 2008 Africa Cup of Nations, scoring one goal in the qualification - in the 4–1 home win over Togo on 19 June 2007. In the finals, he scored a consolation goal as Benin lost 4–1 to Ivory Coast on 25 January 2008.

He scored eight goals in eight matches in 2008 for the national team, making him joint top scorer in the African World Cup/Nations Cup qualifiers with Samuel Eto'o. He scored six goals in the second round of qualification for the 2010 FIFA World Cup as Benin finished top in group 3. His first two goals came on 8 June 2008 in the 4–1 win over Uganda. Six days later he scored in the 2–0 away win over Niger. On 7 September, his two goals in the 3–2 home win over Angola helped Benin book their place in the third round. His sixth goal came in the final group game, a 2–1 away defeat to Uganda on 12 October. In the third and final qualification round, he scored twice as Benin finished second in group D. He scored Benin's winning goal against Sudan on 5 June 2009, and a penalty in their final group game, a 2–1 away win over Sudan on 10 November.

== Personal life and death ==
Omotoyossi died in Nigeria on 19 August 2025, at the age of 39. His death sparked outrage on social media platforms after his brother told media Omotoyossi had been struggling with depression and illness due to financial issues. In July, his house was lost in a fire, and two weeks prior his sister had died.

== Career statistics ==
Scores and results list Benin's goal tally first, score column indicates score after each Omotoyossi goal.

List of international goals scored by Razak Omotoyossi
| No. | Date | Venue | Opponent | Score | Result | Competition |
|---|---|---|---|---|---|---|
| 1 | 7 February 2007 | Stade Robert Diochon, Rouen, France | Senegal | 1–2 | 1–2 | Friendly |
| 2 | 17 June 2007 | Stade de l'Amitié, Cotonou, Benin | Togo | 1–0 | 4–1 | 2008 Africa Cup of Nations qualifier |
| 3 | 17 June 2007 | Stade de l'Amitié, Cotonou, Benin | Togo | 3–0 | 4–1 | 2008 Africa Cup of Nations qualifier |
| 4 | 21 November 2007 | Ohene Djan Stadium, Accra, Ghana | Ghana | 2–0 | 2–4 | 2007 Ghana Four Nations Tournament (Friendly) |
| 5 | 21 January 2008 | Sekondi Stadium, Sekondi-Takoradi, Ghana | Ivory Coast | 1–4 | 1–4 | 2008 Africa Cup of Nations |
| 6 | 8 June 2008 | Stade de l'Amitié, Cotonou, Benin | Uganda | 1–1 | 4–1 | 2010 FIFA World Cup qualifier |
| 7 | 8 June 2008 | Stade de l'Amitié, Cotonou, Benin | Uganda | 4–1 | 4–1 | 2010 FIFA World Cup qualifier |
| 8 | 14 June 2008 | Stade Général Seyni Kountché, Niamey, Niger | Niger | 2–0 | 2–0 | 2010 FIFA World Cup qualifier |
| 9 | 20 August 2008 | Stade Moulay Abdellah, Rabat, Morocco | Morocco | 1–1 | 1–3 | Friendly |
| 10 | 7 September 2008 | Stade de l'Amitié, Cotonou, Benin | Angola | 2–1 | 3–2 | 2010 FIFA World Cup qualifier |
| 11 | 7 September 2008 | Stade de l'Amitié, Cotonou, Benin | Angola | 3–1 | 3–2 | 2010 FIFA World Cup qualifier |
| 12 | 12 October 2008 | Mandela National Stadium, Kampala, Uganda | Uganda | 1–0 | 1–2 | 2010 FIFA World Cup qualifier |
| 13 | 19 November 2008 | Cairo International Stadium, Cairo, Egypt | Egypt | 1–5 | 1–5 | Friendly |
| 14 | 7 June 2009 | Stade de l'Amitié, Cotonou, Benin | Sudan | 1–0 | 1–0 | 2010 FIFA World Cup qualifier |
| 15 | 14 November 2009 | Al Merreikh Stadium, Omdurman, Sudan | Sudan | 1–0 | 2–1 | 2010 FIFA World Cup qualifier |
| 16 | 12 January 2010 | Ombaka National Stadium, Benguela, Angola | Mozambique | 1–0 | 2–2 | 2010 Africa Cup of Nations |
| 17 | 9 October 2010 | Stade Amahoro, Kigali, Rwanda | Rwanda | 2–0 | 3–0 | 2012 Africa Cup of Nations qualifier |
| 18 | 2 February 2011 | Stade 11 June, Tripoli, Libya | Libya | 2–3 | 2–3 | Friendly |
| 19 | 3 June 2012 | Stade de l'Amitié, Cotonou, Benin | Mali | 1–0 | 1–0 | 2014 FIFA World Cup qualifier |
| 20 | 10 June 2012 | Stade Amahoro, Kigali, Rwanda | Rwanda | 1–0 | 1–1 | 2014 FIFA World Cup qualifier |
| 21 | 16 June 2013 | Stade du 26 Mars, Bamako, Mali | Mali | 2–1 | 2–2 | 2014 FIFA World Cup qualifier |

== Honours ==
Individual

- Allsvenskan top scorer: 2007 (shared with Marcus Berg)
