= Pär Hansson =

Swedish footballer (born 1986)

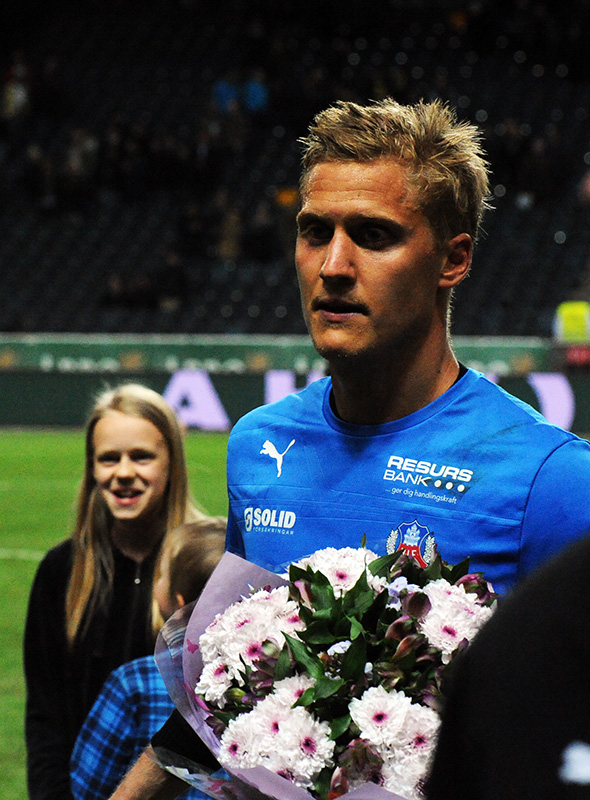

Personal information
- Full name: Pär Johan Åke Hansson
- Date of birth: 22 June 1986 (age 40)
- Place of birth: Vejbystrand, Sweden
- Height: 1.85 m (6 ft 1 in)
- Position: Goalkeeper

Youth career
- 1992–2001: Vejbyslätts IF
- 2001–2005: Helsingborgs IF

Senior career*
Years	Team	Apps	(Gls)
2005–2015	Helsingborgs IF	193	(0)
2006–2008	→ Ängelholms FF (loan)	79	(0)
2016–2017	Feyenoord	1	(0)
2017–2019	Helsingborgs IF	39	(0)
Total		312	(0)

International career
2002–2003	Sweden U17	7	(0)
2004–2005	Sweden U19	10	(0)
2007–2009	Sweden U21	9	(0)
2011–2014	Sweden	6	(0)
- * Club domestic league appearances and goals

Pär Johan Åke Hansson (born 22 June 1986) is a Swedish former professional footballer who played as a goalkeeper. He represented Helsingborgs IF, Ängelholms FF, and Feyenoord during a professional career that spanned between 2005 and 2019. A full international between 2011 and 2014, he won six caps for the Sweden national team and was a squad member at UEFA Euro 2012.

== Club career ==
Hansson represented Helsingborgs IF, Ängelholms FF, and Feyenoord between 2005 and 2019. A neck injury forced him to announce his retirement from professional football in 2019.

== International career ==
Hansson represented the Sweden U17, U19, and U21 teams and was a part of the Sweden U21 squad that reached the semi-finals of the 2009 UEFA European Under-21 Championship on home soil in Sweden.

Hansson made his full international debut for Sweden on 19 January 2011 in a friendly 2–1 win against Botswana. He was selected for Sweden's UEFA Euro 2012 squad, and served as a backup goalkeeper for Andreas Isaksson together with Johan Wiland during the tournament. He made his first and only competitive game for Sweden in a 2014 FIFA World Cup qualifier against Faroe Islands on 11 June 2013, covering for Andreas Isaksson in a 2–0 win at Friends Arena. He made his sixth and final international appearance on 17 January 2014 against Moldova, playing for 90 minutes in a friendly 2–1 win.

== Career statistics ==
=== International ===
Appearances and goals by national team and year
National team	Year	Apps	Goals
Sweden	2011	1	0
Sweden	2012	1	0
Sweden	2013	3	0
Sweden	2014	1	0
Total		6	0

== Honours ==
Helsingborgs IF

- Allsvenskan: 2011
- Svenska Cupen: 2010, 2011
- Svenska Supercupen: 2011, 2012

Feyenoord

- Eredivisie : 2016–17
- KNVB Cup: 2015–16

Sweden

- King's Cup: 2013
