= Andreas Landgren =

Swedish footballer

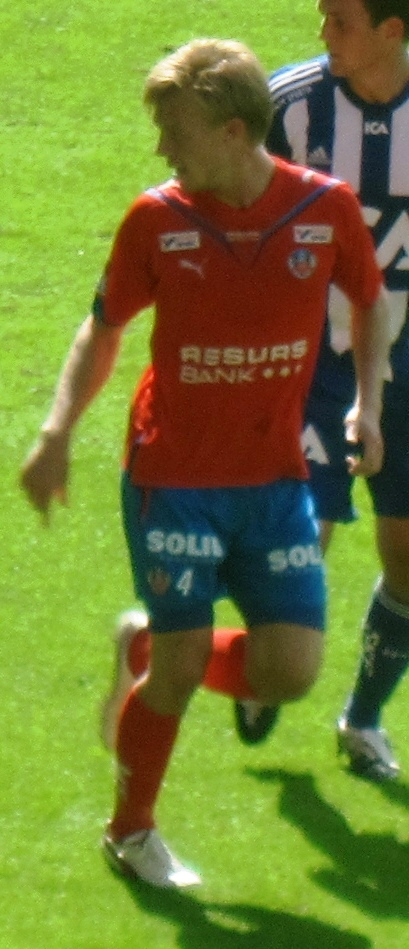

Personal information
- Full name: Sven Andreas Landgren
- Date of birth: 17 March 1989 (age 37)
- Place of birth: Helsingborg, Sweden
- Height: 1.76 m (5 ft 9 1/2 in)
- Positions: Defender; midfielder

Youth career
- 1995–2006: Helsingborgs IF

Senior career*
Years	Team	Apps	(Gls)
2006–2009	Helsingborgs IF	52	(4)
2010–2011	Udinese	0	(0)
2010–2011	→ Willem II (loan)	13	(2)
2011	→ Fredrikstad (loan)	12	(0)
2012–2013	Fredrikstad	27	(1)
2013	→ Halmstads BK (loan)	27	(2)
2014–2023	Helsingborgs IF	143	(4)

International career
2004–2006	Sweden U17	19	(5)
2006–2008	Sweden U19	13	(2)
2008–2010	Sweden U21	15	(0)
2009	Sweden	1	(0)
- * Club domestic league appearances and goals

Sven Andreas Landgren (born 17 March 1989) is a Swedish former footballer who played as a midfielder or defender.

He started his professional career in Helsingborgs IF, where his father Sven Åke played almost 350 matches. In 2010, Landgren transferred to Italian side Udinese. He did not play any first-team matches for the club, and was loaned out to Willem II during the 2010–11 Eredivisie season. He joined Norwegian side Fredrikstad on loan in mid-2011, and joined the club permanently ahead of the 2012 season. After Fredrikstad was relegated from Tippeligaen, Landgren moved back to Sweden where he joined Halmstads BK on loan in April 2013. A year later, he transferred back to his home town club Helsingborgs IF. However, an injury kept him out of play for the whole 2014 season.

== Club career ==
Landgren made his Allsvenskan debut in 2006. After a string of strong matches during the friendly season, he was promoted to the senior squad of Helsingborgs IF in 2007. He can play either as a midfielder, defensive midfielder and right back. On 11 January 2010 Udinese Calcio officialized the arrival of the 20-year-old Swedish defensive midfielder from Helsingborgs IF.

On 16 January 2010, he played his first match for Udinese's youth team.

In the 2010–11 season, Landgren played on loan for the Dutch side Willem II when the team was relegated from the Eredivisie. He joined the Norwegian side Fredrikstad on loan in August 2011. After the 2011 season, Landgren joined Fredrikstad permanently. After Fredrikstad was relegated from the Tippeligaen in 2012, Landgren joined the Allsvenskan side Halmstads BK on loan ahead of the 2013 season.

== International career ==
Landgren represented the Sweden under-21 team, where he played 15 matches. He was also a part of the Swedish squad in the 2009 UEFA European Under-21 Football Championship. He made his debut for the Sweden national team in a friendly match against Mexico in January 2009.

== Personal life ==
He is the son of Sven-Åke Landgren, who played almost 350 first-team matches for Helsingborgs IF, and was named in the "all-time Helsingborgs team" in 2007.
