= Fredrik Svanbäck =

Finnish-Swedish footballer and manager (born 1979)

Personal information
- Full name: Fredrik Jan-Erik Svanbäck
- Date of birth: 5 December 1979 (age 46)
- Place of birth: Jakobstad, Finland
- Height: 1.73 m (5 ft 8 in)
- Position: Midfielder

Youth career
- 1985–1996: Jaro

Senior career*
| Years | Team | Apps | (Gls) |
| 1997–2004 | Jaro | 175 | (38) |
| 2005–2009 | Helsingborg | 93 | (4) |
| 2008 | → Jaro (loan) | 7 | (0) |
| 2010–2013 | Landskrona BoIS | 107 | (8) |
| 2014 | Jaro | 29 | (0) |
| 2015 | Höganäs BK | | |
| 2016–2017 | Croatia Helsingborg KIF | | |

International career
| 2004–2008 | Finland | 2 | (0) |

Managerial career
- Croatia Helsingborg KIF
- * Club domestic league appearances and goals

Fredrik Svanbäck (born 5 December 1979) is a Finnish former football player and manager. He signed for Helsingborgs IF in 2004 having spent all his career up to that at FF Jaro in his home town. He is a left midfielder, but has also tried the full-back position. He has been capped twice for Finland.

== Personal life ==
His son Adrian Svanbäck is a professional footballer for Helsingborgs IF.
