= Daniel Andersson (footballer, born 1972) =

Swedish association football goalkeeper

Personal information
- Full name: Daniel Lennart Andersson
- Date of birth: 18 December 1972 (age 53)
- Place of birth: Bjuv, Sweden
- Height: 1.87 m (6 ft 2 in)
- Position: Goalkeeper

Youth career
- 1978–1991: Bjuvs IF

Senior career*
Years	Team	Apps	(Gls)
1989–1990	Bjuvs IF	44	(0)
1991–1992	Ramlösa BoIS	14	(0)
1992–1993	Ängelholms FF	47	(0)
1994	Kalmar FF	0	(0)
1995–1998	Högaborgs BK	60	(0)
1998–2000	Trelleborgs FF	54	(0)
2000–2003	AIK	52	(0)
2003–2004	Hibernian	41	(0)
2004–2009	Helsingborgs IF	130	(0)
2010	Ängelholms FF	30	(0)
2011–2015	Helsingborgs IF	2	(0)
2018	Helsingborgs IF	1	(0)
Total		475	(0)

International career
2001	Sweden	1	(0)

Managerial career
- Helsingborgs IF (goalkeeper coach)
- * Club domestic league appearances and goals

Daniel Lennart Andersson (born 18 December 1972) is a Swedish former professional footballer who played as a goalkeeper.

== Club career ==
Andersson played for clubs including Trelleborgs FF, AIK, Helsingborgs IF and Hibernian in Scotland.

When playing in Scotland for Hibernian Andersson helped them reach the 2004 Scottish League Cup Final, which they lost 2–0 to Livingston. In the semi-final against Rangers he saved a Mikel Arteta penalty in normal time and then saved two further penalties in the shootout, from Michael Ball and Zurab Khizanishvili.

After retiring in 2015, Andersson came out of retirement - at the age of 45 - when he signed a short-term contract for the rest of the season with Helsingborgs IF on 28 September 2018, after first-choice goalkeeper, Pär Hansson, got injured for the rest of the season.

== International career ==
Andersson was capped once by the Sweden national team, in 2001.
