= Erik Wahlstedt =

Swedish footballer

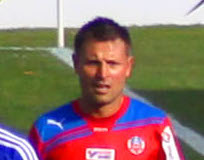

Personal information
- Full name: Ulf Erik Wahlstedt
- Date of birth: 16 April 1976 (age 50)
- Place of birth: Gothenburg, Sweden
- Height: 1.78 m (5 ft 10 in)
- Positions: Defender; midfielder

Youth career
- 1982–1992: BK Astrio

Senior career*
Years	Team	Apps	(Gls)
1993	BK Astrio	15	(4)
1994–1996	IFK Göteborg	33	(5)
1997–2001	Helsingborgs IF	89	(11)
2001–2004	Esbjerg fB	79	(1)
2004–2012	Helsingborgs IF	166	(4)
Total		382	(25)

International career
1991–1992	Sweden U17	13	(8)
1993–1994	Sweden U19	14	(6)
1995–1998	Sweden U21	13	(4)
1998–2004	Sweden	2	(0)
- * Club domestic league appearances and goals as of 9 November 2009

Ulf Erik Wahlstedt (born 16 April 1976) is a Swedish former professional footballer who played as a defender and midfielder. He is best remembered for his time with Helsingborgs IF with which he won two Allsvenskan titles and four Svenska Cupen titles, but also represented BK Astrio, IFK Göteborg, and Esbjerg fB during a career that spanned between 1993 and 2012. He won two caps for the Sweden national team between 1998 and 2004 and represented his country at UEFA Euro 2004.

== Club career ==
Beginning his career with BK Astrio, Wahlstedt signed for the Allsvenskan club IFK Göteborg in 1994 and helped the team win the 1994, 1995, and 1996 Allsvenskan titles. He also represented IFK Göteborg in the UEFA Champions League. Nonetheless, he was dissatisfied with his amount of playing time in IFK, and was wanted by Norwegian clubs such as Skeid and possibly Viking. He ended up signing for Helsingborgs IF in 1997 and helped the club win the 1999 Allsvenskan and a Svenska Cupen title before leaving for Esbjerg fB in Denmark. He returned to Helsingborg in 2004 and won another Allsvenskan title and three other Svenska Cupen titles before retiring in 2012.

== International career ==
Wahlstedt represented the Sweden U17, U19, and U21 teams a total of 40 times before making his full international debut for Sweden on 24 January 1998 in a friendly game against the United States, playing for 76 minutes in a 1–0 loss before being replaced by Mats Lilienberg. Six years later, on 28 April 2004, he won his second and last international cap in a friendly 2–2 draw with Portugal. He was named in the Sweden men's national football team for UEFA Euro 2004 in Portugal, but did not play.

== Career statistics ==
=== International ===
Appearances and goals by national team and year
National team	Year	Apps	Goals
Sweden	1998	1	0
Sweden	1999	0	0
Sweden	2000	0	0
Sweden	2001	0	0
Sweden	2002	0	0
Sweden	2003	0	0
Sweden	2004	1	0
Total		2	0

== Honours ==
IFK Göteborg

- Allsvenskan: 1994, 1995, 1996

Helsingborgs IF

- Allsvenskan: 1999, 2011
- Svenska Cupen: 1997–98, 2006, 2010, 2011
