= 2015 IFK Göteborg season =

IFK Göteborg
2015 season
- Chairman: Karl Jartun
- Head coach: Jörgen Lennartsson
- Stadium: Gamla Ullevi
- Allsvenskan: 2nd
- 2014–15 Svenska Cupen: Winners
- Svenska Supercupen: Runners-up
- 2015–16 UEFA Europa League: Third qualifying round
- Top goalscorer: League: Søren Rieks (10); All: Lasse Vibe (13)
- Highest home attendance: 17,340 vs. Kalmar FF (31 October 2015, Allsvenskan)
- Lowest home attendance: 3,423 vs. Ljungskile SK (8 March 2015, Svenska Cupen); Allsvenskan: 9,501 vs. Falkenbergs FF (4 May 2015)
- Average home league attendance: 14,350
Home colours	Away colours	Third colours

The 2015 season was IFK Göteborg's 110th in existence, their 83rd season in Allsvenskan and their 39th consecutive season in the league. They competed in Allsvenskan where they finished second for the second season in a row, Svenska Cupen where they won the competition, Svenska Supercupen where they finished as runners-up and in qualification for the UEFA Europa League where they were knocked out in the third qualifying round. IFK Göteborg also participated in one competition in which the club continued playing in for the 2016 season, 2015–16 Svenska Cupen. The season began with the group stage of Svenska Cupen on 21 February, league play started on 5 April and lasted until 31 October. The season concluded on 8 November with Svenska Supercupen against IFK Norrköping.

Jörgen Lennartsson was appointed new head coach, this after the former head coach Mikael Stahre was sacked.

The club won their 7th Svenska Cupen title on 17 May 2015 when they defeated Örebro SK with 2–1 in the final at Gamla Ullevi.

== Key events ==
- 6 June 2014: Defender Ludwig Augustinsson leaves the club, transferring to Copenhagen.
- 18 August 2014: Defender Haitam Aleesami joins the club on a four-year contract, transferring from Fredrikstad FK.
- 19 September 2014: Defender Kjetil Wæhler leaves the club. On 21 November he joined Tippeligaen club Vålerenga.
- 21 October 2014: Midfielder Hampus Zackrisson leaves the club. On 8 December he joined Superettan club Degerfors IF.
- 23 October 2014: Defender Tom Pettersson joins the club on a four-year contract, transferring from Åtvidabergs FF.
- 23 October 2014: Forward Mikael Boman joins the club on a three-year contract, transferring from Halmstads BK.
- 1 November 2014: Goalkeeper Mattias Hugosson leaves the club and retires.
- 3 November 2014: Head coach Mikael Stahre is being sacked.
- 4 November 2014: Midfielders Jakob Johansson and May Mahlangu both leave the club. On 28 December Johansson joined Greek club AEK Athens and on 2 February 2015 Mahlangu joined Turkish club Konyaspor.
- 7 November 2014: Forward Kenneth Zohore leaves the club and returns to Fiorentina after his loan deal wasn't extended.
- 12 November 2014: Midfielder Diego Calvo leaves the club and returns to Vålerenga after his loan deal wasn't extended.
- 25 November 2014: The club announces the appointment of Jörgen Lennartsson as the new head coach.
- 26 November 2014: Defender Jonathan Azulay leaves the club, transferring to Östersunds FK.
- 3 December 2014: Midfielder Joel Allansson leaves the club, transferring to Randers FC.
- 3 December 2014: Midfielder Philip Haglund leaves the club. On 4 December he joined Allsvenskan rival Hammarby IF.
- 8 December 2014: Defender Billy Nordström and midfielder Karl Bohm are both promoted to the first-team squad, both signing a one-year contract to keep them at the club until the end of the season.
- 11 December 2014: Goalkeeper Marcus Sandberg signs a new one-year contract, keeping him at the club until the end of the season.
- 17 December 2014: Defender Hjálmar Jónsson signs a new one-year contract, keeping him at the club until the end of the season.
- 22 December 2014: Midfielder Sebastian Eriksson joins the club on a six months loan contract, transferring from Cagliari.
- 22 December 2014: Forward Malick Mané leaves the club on loan to Hønefoss BK for the duration of the season.
- 28 December 2014: Midfielders Prosper Kasim and Lawson Sabah both join the club on five-year contracts, transferring from International Allies.
- 5 January 2015: Midfielder Nordin Gerzić leaves the club. On 21 January he joined his old club Örebro SK.
- 29 January 2015: Defender Heath Pearce joins the club on a five-month contract, transferring from Montreal Impact.
- 30 January 2015: Midfielder Daniel Sobralense leaves the club. On 3 February he joined his old club Fortaleza.
- 2 February 2015: Midfielder Jakob Ankersen joins the club on a three-year contract, transferring from Esbjerg fB.
- 7 February 2015: Defender Emil Salomonsson is selected as 2014 Archangel of the Year, an annual price given by the Supporterklubben Änglarna to a player who has shown a great loyalty to IFK Göteborg.
- 14 March 2015: Defender Thomas Rogne joins the club on a three-year contract, transferring from Wigan Athletic.
- 15 March 2015: Forward Thomas Mikkelsen joins the club on a loan deal until 1 July 2015, transferring from OB.
- 8 April 2015: Goalkeeper Johan Hagman joins the club on a one-year contract, transferring from Örgryte IS.
- 17 May 2015: IFK Göteborg wins their 7th Svenska Cupen title after defeating Örebro SK in the final.
- 25 May 2015: Midfielder Sebastian Eriksson joins the club on a three-year contract, transferring on a permanent basis from Cagliari.
- 5 June 2015: Defender Heath Pearce leaves the club.
- 18 June 2015: Forward Thomas Mikkelsen leaves the club and returns to OB after his loan deal wasn't extended.
- 14 July 2015: Forward Victor Sköld joins the club on a two-and-a-half-year contract, transferring from Åtvidabergs FF.
- 23 July 2015: Forward Lasse Vibe leaves the club, transferring to Brentford.
- 24 July 2015: Midfielder Karl Bohm leaves the club on loan to Utsiktens BK for the duration of the season.
- 28 July 2015: Defender Patrick Dyrestam leaves the club on loan to Utsiktens BK for the duration of the season.
- 5 August 2015: Forward Riku Riski joins the club on a loan contract for the rest of the season, transferring from Rosenborg BK.
- 11 August 2015: Midfielder Mads Albæk joins the club on a two-and-a-half-year contract, transferring from Reims.
- 16 September 2015: Forward Malick Mané leaves the club on loan to Najran until 15 July 2016.
- 5 November 2015: Goalkeeper John Alvbåge is selected as Allsvenskan goalkeeper of the year.

== Players ==
=== Squad ===
Note: Flags indicate national team as defined under FIFA eligibility rules; some limited exceptions apply. Players may hold more than one non-FIFA nationality.

No.	Pos.	Nation	Player
1	GK	SWE	John Alvbåge
2	DF	SWE	Emil Salomonsson
3	DF	USA	Heath Pearce
4	DF	NOR	Haitam Aleesami
6	MF	SWE	Sebastian Eriksson
7	MF	DEN	Mads Albæk
8	MF	DEN	Søren Rieks
9	MF	DEN	Jakob Ankersen
10	FW	FIN	Riku Riski (on loan from Rosenborg BK)
11	MF	BOL	Martin Smedberg-Dalence
12	GK	SWE	Marcus Sandberg
13	MF	SWE	Gustav Svensson (vice captain)
14	DF	ISL	Hjálmar Jónsson
15	FW	DEN	Thomas Mikkelsen

No.	Pos.	Nation	Player
16	FW	SWE	Mikael Boman
17	MF	GHA	Prosper Kasim
18	MF	GHA	Lawson Sabah
19	FW	SWE	Gustav Engvall
20	FW	SWE	Victor Sköld
22	DF	SWE	Adam Johansson
23	DF	SWE	Patrick Dyrestam
24	DF	SWE	Tom Pettersson
25	GK	SWE	Johan Hagman
26	MF	SWE	Karl Bohm
27	DF	SWE	Billy Nordström
28	DF	NOR	Thomas Rogne
29	FW	DEN	Lasse Vibe
30	DF	SWE	Mattias Bjärsmyr (captain)

=== Youth players with first-team appearances ===
Youth players who played a competitive match for the club in 2015. Note: Flags indicate national team as defined under FIFA eligibility rules; some limited exceptions apply. Players may hold more than one non-FIFA nationality.

No. / Pos. / Nation / Player; 3 / FW / SWE / Patrik Karlsson Lagemyr	No. / Pos. / Nation / Player; 32 / DF / SWE / Martin Johansson Zanjanchi

=== Transfers ===
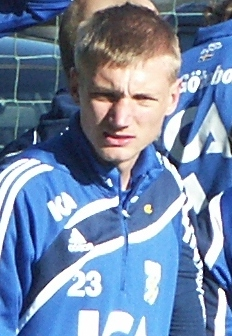
Midfielder Sebastian Eriksson returned to the club after three and a half seasons in Cagliari.

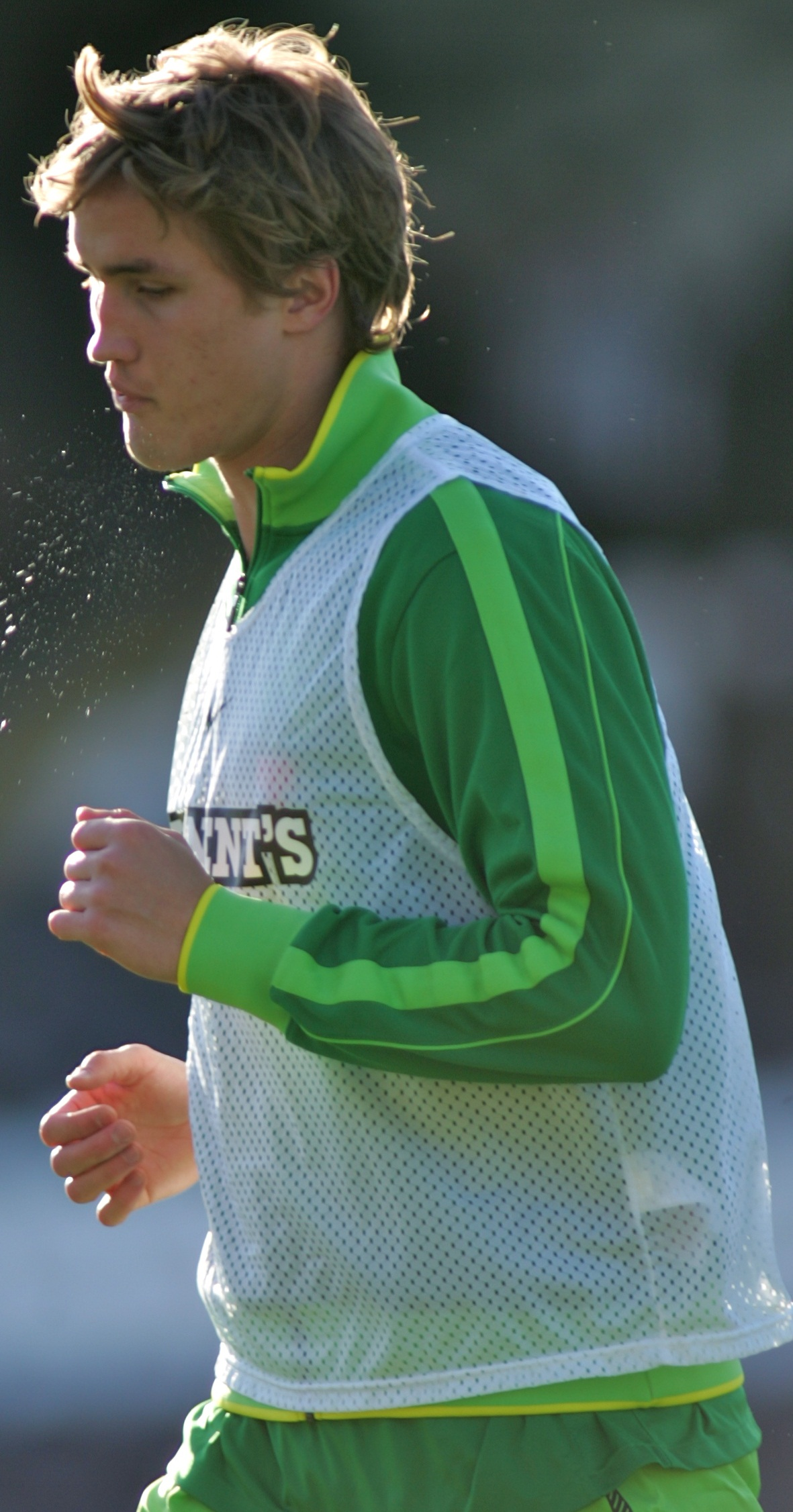
Defender Thomas Rogne joined the club on a three-year contract from English club Wigan Athletic.

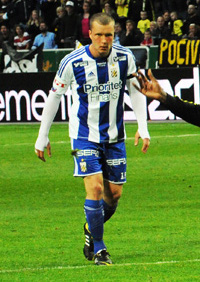
Midfielder Jakob Johansson left the club for Greek side AEK Athens after eight seasons.

==== In ====
No.	Pos.	Nat.	Name	Age	Moving from	Type	Transfer window	Ends	Transfer fee	Source
8	MF	(Sweden)	Nordin Gerzić	31	Örebro SK	Loan return	Winter	2015	—	ifkgoteborg.se
10	MF	(Brazil)	Daniel Sobralense	31	Örebro SK	Loan return	Winter	2015	—	ifkgoteborg.se
20	DF	(Sweden)	Jonathan Azulay	20	Östersunds FK	Loan return	Winter	2014	—	ifkgoteborg.se
21	FW	(Senegal)	Malick Mané	26	Central Coast Mariners	Loan return	Winter	2017	—	ifkgoteborg.se
4	DF	(Norway)	Haitam Aleesami	23	Fredrikstad FK	Transfer	Winter	2018	(~ 1.0M SEK)	ifkgoteborg.se
16	FW	(Sweden)	Mikael Boman	26	Halmstads BK	Bosman	Winter	2017	Free	ifkgoteborg.se
24	DF	(Sweden)	Tom Pettersson	24	Åtvidabergs FF	Transfer	Winter	2018	Undisclosed	ifkgoteborg.se
26	MF	(Sweden)	Karl Bohm	18	Youth system	Promoted	Winter	2015	—	ifkgoteborg.se
27	MF	(Sweden)	Billy Nordström	18	Youth system	Promoted	Winter	2015	—	ifkgoteborg.se
6	MF	(Sweden)	Sebastian Eriksson	25	Cagliari	Loan	Winter	2015 (June)	—	ifkgoteborg.se
3	DF	(United States)	Heath Pearce	30	Montreal Impact	Transfer	Winter	2015 (June)	Free	ifkgoteborg.se
9	MF	(Denmark)	Jakob Ankersen	24	Esbjerg fB	Transfer	Winter	2017	(~ 4.5M SEK)	ifkgoteborg.se
28	DF	(Norway)	Thomas Rogne	24	Wigan Athletic	Bosman	Winter	2017	Free	ifkgoteborg.se
15	FW	(Denmark)	Thomas Mikkelsen	25	OB	Loan	Winter	2015 (June)	—	ifkgoteborg.se
25	GK	(Sweden)	Johan Hagman	33	Örgryte IS	Bosman	Winter	2015	Free	ifkgoteborg.se
17	MF	(Ghana)	Prosper Kasim	18	Inter Allies	Transfer	Summer	2020 (June)	Undisclosed	ifkgoteborg.se
18	MF	(Ghana)	Lawson Sabah	18	Inter Allies	Transfer	Summer	2020 (June)	Undisclosed	ifkgoteborg.se
6	MF	(Sweden)	Sebastian Eriksson	26	Cagliari	Transfer	Summer	2018 (June)	(~ 3.0M SEK)	ifkgoteborg.se
20	FW	(Sweden)	Victor Sköld	25	Åtvidabergs FF	Transfer	Summer	2017	(~ 0.5M SEK)	ifkgoteborg.se
10	FW	(Finland)	Riku Riski	25	Rosenborg	Loan	Summer	2015	—	ifkgoteborg.se
7	MF	(Denmark)	Mads Albæk	25	Reims	Transfer	Summer	2017	(~ 2.9M SEK)	ifkgoteborg.se
21	FW	(Senegal)	Malick Mané	26	Hønefoss BK	Loan return	Summer	2017	—	ifkgoteborg.se

==== Out ====
No.	Pos.	Nat.	Name	Age	Moving to	Type	Transfer window	Transfer fee	Source
4	DF	(Norway)	Kjetil Wæhler	38	Vålerenga	End of contract	Winter	Free	ifkgoteborg.se
3	MF	(Sweden)	Hampus Zackrisson	20	Degerfors IF	End of contract	Winter	Free	ifkgoteborg.se
25	GK	(Sweden)	Mattias Hugosson	40	Retirement	End of contract	Winter	—	ifkgoteborg.se
15	MF	(Sweden)	Jakob Johansson	24	AEK Athens	End of contract	Winter	Free	ifkgoteborg.se
26	MF	(South Africa)	May Mahlangu	25	Konyaspor	End of contract	Winter	Free	ifkgoteborg.se
20	DF	(Sweden)	Jonathan Azulay	21	Östersunds FK	End of contract	Winter	Free	ifkgoteborg.se
5	MF	(Sweden)	Philip Haglund	27	Hammarby IF	End of contract	Winter	Free	ifkgoteborg.se
6	DF	(Sweden)	Ludwig Augustinsson	20	Copenhagen	Transfer	Winter	(~ 13.0M SEK)	ifkgoteborg.se
16	FW	(Denmark)	Kenneth Zohore	20	Fiorentina	Loan return	Winter	—	ifkgoteborg.se
27	MF	(Sweden)	Joel Allansson	22	Randers FC	Transfer	Winter	(~ 1.0M SEK)	ifkgoteborg.se
24	MF	(Costa Rica)	Diego Calvo	23	Vålerenga	Loan return	Winter	—	ifkgoteborg.se
21	FW	(Senegal)	Malick Mané	26	Hønefoss BK	Loan	Winter	—	ifkgoteborg.se
8	MF	(Sweden)	Nordin Gerzić	31	Örebro SK	Transfer	Winter	Free	ifkgoteborg.se
10	MF	(Brazil)	Daniel Sobralense	31	Fortaleza	Transfer	Winter	Free	ifkgoteborg.se
6	MF	(Sweden)	Sebastian Eriksson	26	Cagliari	Loan return	Summer	—	ifkgoteborg.se
3	DF	(United States)	Heath Pearce	30	Retirement	End of contract	Summer	—	ifkgoteborg.se
15	FW	(Denmark)	Thomas Mikkelsen	25	OB	Loan return	Summer	—	ifkgoteborg.se
29	FW	(Denmark)	Lasse Vibe	28	Brentford	Transfer	Summer	(~ 13.0M SEK)	ifkgoteborg.se
26	MF	(Sweden)	Karl Bohm	19	Utsiktens BK	Loan	Summer	—	ifkgoteborg.se
23	DF	(Sweden)	Patrick Dyrestam	19	Utsiktens BK	Loan	Summer	—	ifkgoteborg.se
21	FW	(Senegal)	Malick Mané	26	Najran	Loan	Summer	—	ifkgoteborg.se

== Squad statistics ==
=== Appearances and goals ===
Number	Position	Name	2015 Allsvenskan		2014–15 Svenska Cupen 2015–16 Svenska Cupen 2015 Svenska Supercupen		2015–16 UEFA Europa League		Total	
Number	Position	Name	Appearances	Goals	Appearances	Goals	Appearances	Goals	Appearances	Goals
1	GK	John Alvbåge	30	0	5	0	4	0	39	0
2	DF	Emil Salomonsson	30	5	8	2	4	0	42	7
3	FW	Patrik Karlsson Lagemyr	0	0	1	0	0	0	1	0
4	DF	Haitam Aleesami	30	2	6	0	4	1	40	3
6	MF	Sebastian Eriksson	27	2	5	1	4	0	36	3
7	MF	Mads Albæk	11	3	1	0	0	0	12	3
8	MF	Søren Rieks	28	10	6	2	4	0	38	12
9	MF	Jakob Ankersen	28	6	7	3	4	0	39	9
10	FW	Riku Riski	11	1	1	0	0	0	12	1
11	MF	Martin Smedberg-Dalence	15	0	6	1	4	0	25	1
12	GK	Marcus Sandberg	0	0	3	0	0	0	3	0
13	MF	Gustav Svensson	28	1	6	0	4	0	38	1
14	DF	Hjálmar Jónsson	19	0	5	0	1	0	25	0
16	FW	Mikael Boman	27	6	7	3	4	1	38	10
17	MF	Prosper Kasim	0	0	2	0	0	0	2	0
18	MF	Lawson Sabah	0	0	1	0	0	0	1	0
19	FW	Gustav Engvall	25	5	5	1	4	1	34	7
20	FW	Victor Sköld	6	0	2	3	1	0	9	3
22	DF	Adam Johansson	1	0	1	0	0	0	2	0
24	DF	Tom Pettersson	25	1	8	2	3	0	36	3
25	GK	Johan Hagman	0	0	0	0	0	0	0	0
27	DF	Billy Nordström	1	0	1	0	0	0	2	0
28	DF	Thomas Rogne	19	1	2	0	4	0	25	1
30	DF	Mattias Bjärsmyr	23	1	7	1	4	0	34	2
32	DF	Martin Johansson Zanjanchi	0	0	1	0	0	0	1	0
Players that left the club during the season
3	DF	Heath Pearce	0	0	3	0	0	0	3	0
15	FW	Thomas Mikkelsen	9	1	1	0	0	0	10	1
23	DF	Patrick Dyrestam	0	0	0	0	0	0	0	0
26	MF	Karl Bohm	0	0	1	0	0	0	1	0
29	FW	Lasse Vibe	16	6	6	7	1	0	23	13

=== Disciplinary record ===
N	P	Nat.	Name	Allsvenskan			Svenska Cupen; Svenska Supercupen			UEFA Europa League			Total			Notes
N	P	Nat.	Name	Yellow card	Second yellow card	Red card	Yellow card	Second yellow card	Red card	Yellow card	Second yellow card	Red card	Yellow card	Second yellow card	Red card	Notes
1	GK	(Sweden)	John Alvbåge				1						1			
2	DF	(Sweden)	Emil Salomonsson	1									1			
4	DF	(Norway)	Haitam Aleesami	2			1			1			4			
6	MF	(Sweden)	Sebastian Eriksson	6			2						8			
7	MF	(Denmark)	Mads Albæk	1									1			
8	MF	(Denmark)	Søren Rieks	6									6			
9	MF	(Denmark)	Jakob Ankersen	5			1						6			
10	FW	(Finland)	Riku Riski	2									2			
13	MF	(Sweden)	Gustav Svensson	4						1			5			
14	DF	(Iceland)	Hjálmar Jónsson	1									1			
19	FW	(Sweden)	Gustav Engvall	2									2			
20	FW	(Sweden)	Victor Sköld	1									1			
24	DF	(Sweden)	Tom Pettersson	2		1	1						3		1	
28	DF	(Norway)	Thomas Rogne	5						1			6			
29	FW	(Denmark)	Lasse Vibe	1									1			
30	DF	(Sweden)	Mattias Bjärsmyr							1			1			

Source: ifkgoteborg.se
Only competitive matches
(yellow card) = Number of bookings; (second yellow card) = Number of sending offs after a second yellow card; (red card) = Number of sending offs by a direct red card.

== Club ==
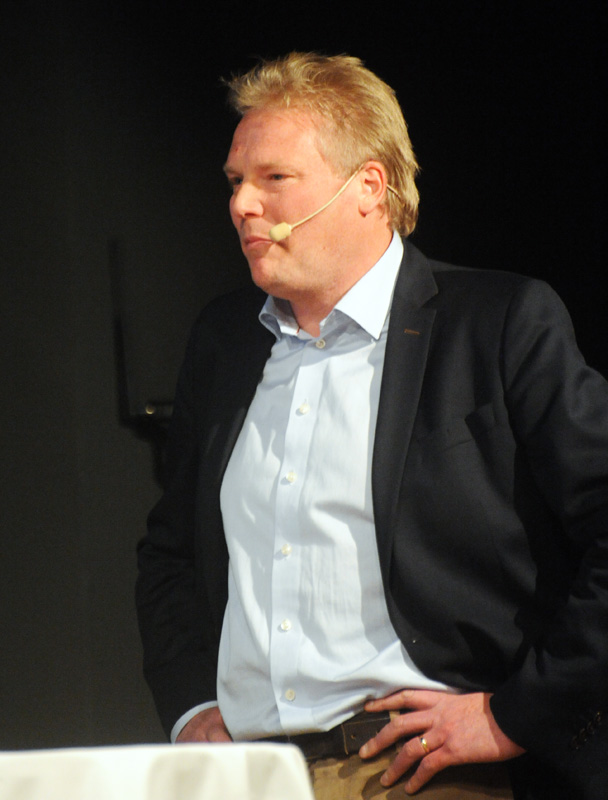
The 2015 season was Jörgen Lennartsson's first season with IFK Göteborg.

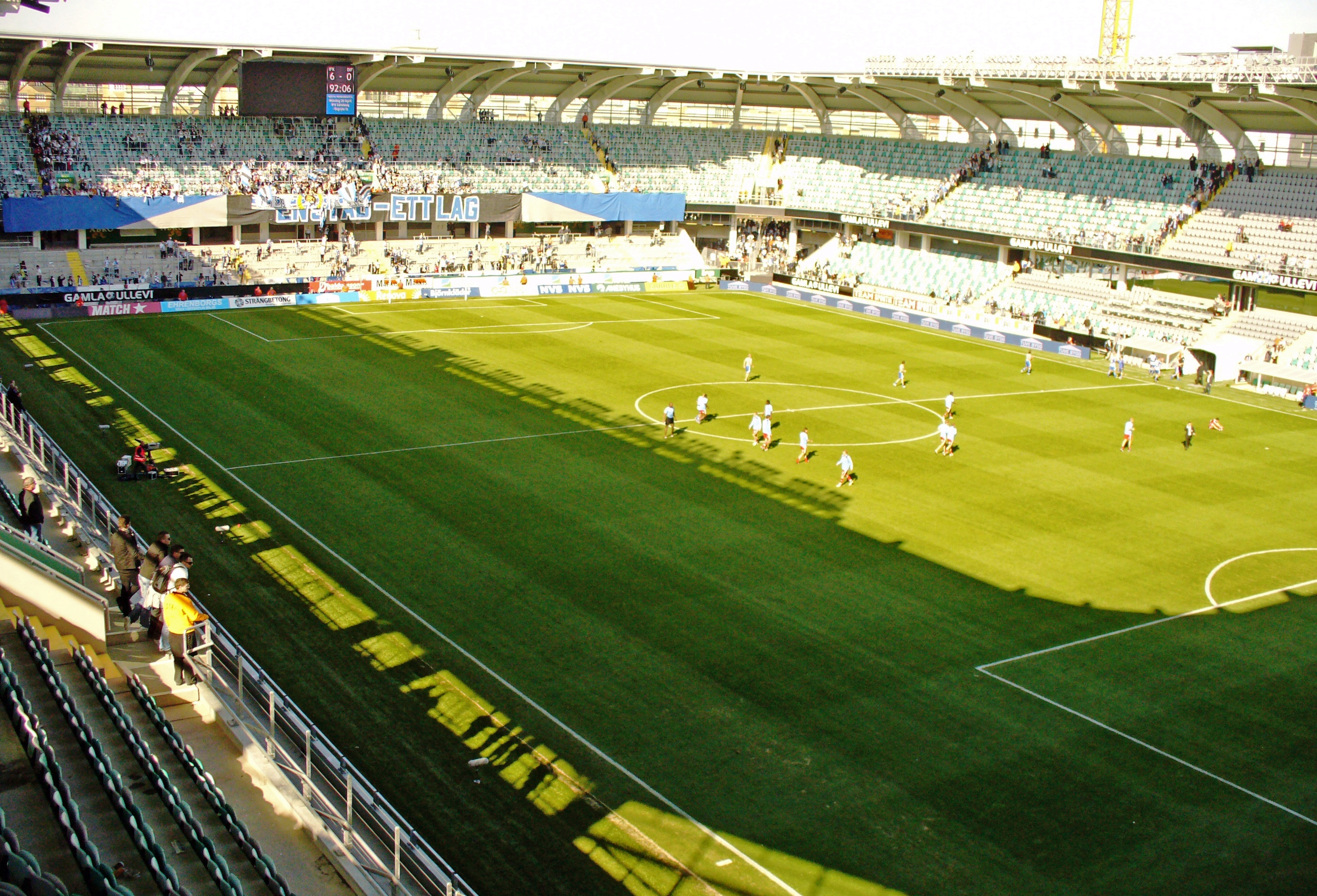
Gamla Ullevi was the fourth largest stadium in Allsvenskan in 2015.

=== Coaching staff ===
Name	Role
(Sweden) Jörgen Lennartsson	Head coach
(Sweden) Magnus Edlund	Assistant coach
(Sweden) Alf Westerberg	Assistant coach / U21 head coach
(Sweden) Johan Kristoffersson	Fitness coach
(Sweden) Stefan Remnér	Goalkeeping coach
(Sweden) Fredrik Larsson	Physiotherapist
(Sweden) Tim Rahmquist	Physiotherapist
(Sweden) Martin Bergqvist	Physiotherapist
(Sweden) Jon Karlsson	Club doctor
(Sweden) Leif Swärd	Club doctor
(Sweden) Lennart Sugiardjo	Club doctor
(Sweden) Johan Örtendahl	Mental coach
(Sweden) Bertil Lundqvist	Equipment manager
(Sweden) Rolf Gustavsson	Equipment manager
(Sweden) Thomas Olsson	U19 head coach
(Sweden) Johan Claesson	U19 assistant coach
(Sweden) Roger Gustafsson	Head coach youth academy
(Sweden) Olle Sultan	Match analyst
(Sweden) Linda Breding	Assistant match analyst

=== Other information ===
Chairman	(Sweden) Karl Jartun
Club director	(Sweden) Martin Kurzwelly
Director of sports	(Sweden) Mats Gren
Ground (capacity and dimensions)	Gamla Ullevi (18,600 / 105x68 m)

Source: IFK Göteborg and Gamla Ullevi

== Competitions ==
=== Overall ===
Competition	Started round	Final position / round	First match	Last match
Allsvenskan	N/A	2nd	5 April 2015	31 October 2015
2014–15 Svenska Cupen	Round 2	Winners	20 August 2014	17 May 2015
Svenska Supercupen	Final	Runners-up	8 November 2015	
UEFA Europa League	Second qualifying round	Third qualifying round	16 July 2015	6 August 2015

Source: Competitions

=== Allsvenskan ===
==== League table ====
Pos	Team	Pld	W	D	L	GF	GA	GD	Pts	Qualification or relegation
1	IFK Norrköping (C)	30	20	6	4	60	33	+27	66	Qualification for the Champions League second qualifying round
2	IFK Göteborg	30	18	9	3	52	22	+30	63	Qualification for the Europa League first qualifying round
3	AIK	30	18	7	5	54	34	+20	61	Qualification for the Europa League first qualifying round
4	IF Elfsborg	30	16	7	7	59	42	+17	55	
5	Malmö FF	30	15	9	6	54	34	+20	54	

Source: svenskfotboll.se (in Swedish)
Rules for classification: 1) Points; 2) Goal difference; 3) Goals scored; 4) Head-to-head points; 5) Head-to-head goal difference; 6) Head-to-head away goals scored; 7) Play-off
(Note: Play-off is only played if need to decide champion, teams for relegation or UEFA competition and will be played on a neutral ground).
(C) Champions

==== Results summary ====
Overall								Home						Away					
Pld	W	D	L	GF	GA	GD	Pts	W	D	L	GF	GA	GD	W	D	L	GF	GA	GD
30	18	9	3	52	22	+30	63	10	4	1	30	8	+22	8	5	2	22	14	+8

Source: svenskfotboll.se (in Swedish)

==== Results by round ====
Round	1	2	3	4	5	6	7	8	9	10	11	12	13	14	15	16	17	18	19	20	21	22	23	24	25	26	27	28	29	30
Ground	H	A	H	A	H	A	H	A	H	A	H	H	A	A	H	A	A	H	A	H	A	H	A	H	A	H	H	A	A	H
Result	W	W	L	W	W	D	W	W	W	W	D	W	W	D	D	D	L	W	L	W	W	W	W	W	D	W	D	D	W	D
Position	6	2	6	3	1	3	3	1	1	1	1	1	1	1	1	1	1	1	1	1	1	1	1	1	1	1	2	3	2	2

Source: see below
A = Away; H = Home; W = Win; D = Draw; L = Loss

==== Matches ====
Kickoff times are in UTC+2 unless stated otherwise.

5 April 2015 Round 1	IFK Göteborg	1–0	Åtvidabergs FF	Gothenburg
15:00	Rogne 56'	Report		Stadium: Gamla Ullevi; Attendance: 15,118; Referee: Markus Strömbergsson (Gävle)

8 April 2015 Round 2	Örebro SK	0–2	IFK Göteborg	Örebro
19:00		Report	Salomonsson 34'; Vibe 88'	Stadium: Behrn Arena; Attendance: 8,121; Referee: Glenn Nyberg (Borlänge)

12 April 2015 Round 3	IFK Göteborg	0–1	Malmö FF	Gothenburg
17:30		Report	Yotún 36'	Stadium: Gamla Ullevi; Attendance: 16,894; Referee: Jonas Eriksson (Sigtuna)

19 April 2015 Round 4	BK Häcken	1–2	IFK Göteborg	Gothenburg
15:00	Simon Gustafson 63'	Report	Eriksson 58' (pen.); Boman 87'	Stadium: Gamla Ullevi; Attendance: 9,237; Referee: Stefan Johannesson (Täby)

27 April 2015 Round 5	IFK Göteborg	3–1	Helsingborgs IF	Gothenburg
19:05	Vibe 6'; Eriksson 18' (pen.); Pettersson 58'	Report	Simović 89'	Stadium: Gamla Ullevi; Attendance: 12,287; Referee: Mohammed Al-Hakim (Köping)

30 April 2015 Round 6	Gefle IF	0–0	IFK Göteborg	Gävle
19:00		Report		Stadium: Strömvallen; Attendance: 4,066; Referee: Mohammed Al-Hakim (Köping)

4 May 2015 Round 7	IFK Göteborg	2–1	Falkenbergs FF	Gothenburg
19:00	Rieks 55', 81'	Report	Araba 85' (pen.)	Stadium: Gamla Ullevi; Attendance: 9,501; Referee: Markus Strömbergsson (Gävle)

8 May 2015 Round 8	Kalmar FF	0–2	IFK Göteborg	Kalmar
19:00		Report	Bjärsmyr 2'; Vibe 56'	Stadium: Guldfågeln Arena; Attendance: 6,763; Referee: Mohammed Al-Hakim (Köping)

21 May 2015 Round 9	IFK Göteborg	3–0	AIK	Gothenburg
19:05	Vibe 38'; Karlsson 67' (o.g.); Boman 70'	Report		Stadium: Gamla Ullevi; Attendance: 14,682; Referee: Jonas Eriksson (Sigtuna)

24 May 2015 Round 10	Halmstads BK	1–2	IFK Göteborg	Halmstad
15:00	Keene 79'	Report	Ankersen 16', 90+2'	Stadium: Örjans Vall; Attendance: 6,136; Referee: Glenn Nyberg (Borlänge)

1 June 2015 Round 11	IFK Göteborg	0–0	Djurgårdens IF	Gothenburg
19:05		Report		Stadium: Gamla Ullevi; Attendance: 14,598; Referee: Martin Strömbergsson (Gävle)

4 June 2015 Round 12	IFK Göteborg	1–0	IF Elfsborg	Gothenburg
19:05	Vibe 45'	Report		Stadium: Gamla Ullevi; Attendance: 16,124; Referee: Michael Lerjéus (Skövde)

7 June 2015 Round 13	Hammarby IF	0–1	IFK Göteborg	Stockholm
15:00		Report	Mikkelsen 86'	Stadium: Tele2 Arena; Attendance: 27,556; Referee: Johan Hamlin (Bro)

5 July 2015 Round 14	GIF Sundsvall	2–2	IFK Göteborg	Sundsvall
17:30	Nilsson 47'; Sigurjónsson 60'	Report	Boman 4'; Vibe 26'	Stadium: Norrporten Arena; Attendance: 5,592; Referee: Patrik Eriksson (Gävle)

12 July 2015 Round 15	IFK Göteborg	0–0	IFK Norrköping	Gothenburg
17:30		Report		Stadium: Gamla Ullevi; Attendance: 16,728; Referee: Johan Hamlin (Bro)

19 July 2015 Round 16	IFK Norrköping	2–2	IFK Göteborg	Norrköping
15:00	Kujović 27'; Fransson 79'	Report	Svensson 18'; Rieks 68'	Stadium: Nya Parken; Attendance: 14,369; Referee: Mohammed Al-Hakim (Köping)

26 July 2015 Round 17	Falkenbergs FF	1–0	IFK Göteborg	Falkenberg
15:00	Nilsson 6'	Report		Stadium: Falkenbergs IP; Attendance: 5,470; Referee: Martin Strömbergsson (Gävle)

2 August 2015 Round 18	IFK Göteborg	6–0	Örebro SK	Gothenburg
17:30	Engvall 15', 44'; Boman 19'; Ankersen 25', 83'; Rieks 49'	Report		Stadium: Gamla Ullevi; Attendance: 11,281; Referee: Markus Strömbergsson (Gävle)

9 August 2015 Round 19	Malmö FF	2–1	IFK Göteborg	Malmö
15:00	Árnason 26'; Rosenberg 43' (pen.)	Report	Salomonsson 85' (pen.)	Stadium: Swedbank Stadion; Attendance: 21,127; Referee: Jonas Eriksson (Sigtuna)

16 August 2015 Round 20	IFK Göteborg	4–0	BK Häcken	Gothenburg
15:00	Rieks 37', 62', 66'; Aleesami 85'	Report		Stadium: Gamla Ullevi; Attendance: 13,635; Referee: Andreas Ekberg (Lund)

23 August 2015 Round 21	Åtvidabergs FF	0–1	IFK Göteborg	Åtvidaberg
15:00		Report	Boman 90+2'	Stadium: Kopparvallen; Attendance: 4,461; Referee: Michael Lerjéus (Skövde)

30 August 2015 Round 22	IFK Göteborg	3–0	Gefle IF	Gothenburg
15:00	Rieks 18'; Riski 50'; Salomonsson 73'	Report		Stadium: Gamla Ullevi; Attendance: 12,071; Referee: Johan Hamlin (Bro)

13 September 2015 Round 23	Helsingborgs IF	1–2	IFK Göteborg	Helsingborg
17:30	Simović 28'	Report	Ankersen 62'; Rieks 70'	Stadium: Olympia; Attendance: 9,555; Referee: Jonas Eriksson (Sigtuna)

20 September 2015 Round 24	IFK Göteborg	1–0	Hammarby IF	Gothenburg
17:30	Rieks 50'	Report		Stadium: Gamla Ullevi; Attendance: 16,617; Referee: Mohammed Al-Hakim (Köping)

24 September 2015 Round 25	IF Elfsborg	1–1	IFK Göteborg	Borås
19:05	Svensson 87'	Report	Salomonsson 90+3' (pen.)	Stadium: Borås Arena; Attendance: 16,177; Referee: Jonas Eriksson (Sigtuna)

28 September 2015 Round 26	IFK Göteborg	3–2	GIF Sundsvall	Gothenburg
19:05	Salomonsson 10' (pen.); Boman 53'; Albæk 80'	Report	Albæk 22' (o.g.); Rajalakso 62'	Stadium: Gamla Ullevi; Attendance: 12,716; Referee: Glenn Nyberg (Borlänge)

4 October 2015 Round 27	IFK Göteborg	1–1	Halmstads BK	Gothenburg
15:00	Aleesami 72'	Report	Keene 37'	Stadium: Gamla Ullevi; Attendance: 15,664; Referee: Kristoffer Karlsson (Höganäs)

19 October 2015 Round 28	Djurgårdens IF	2–2	IFK Göteborg	Stockholm
19:05	S. Johnson 60'; Walker 84' (pen.)	Report	Engvall 69'; Ankersen 72'	Stadium: Tele2 Arena; Attendance: 14,018; Referee: Mohammed Al-Hakim (Köping)

26 October 2015 Round 29	AIK	1–2	IFK Göteborg	Solna
19:05 UTC+1	Goitom 19'	Report	Engvall 21', 59'	Stadium: Friends Arena; Attendance: 43,713; Referee: Andreas Ekberg (Lund)

31 October 2015 Round 30	IFK Göteborg	2–2	Kalmar FF	Gothenburg
13:00 UTC+1	Albæk 45+2', 84'	Report	Eriksson 16'; Diouf 40'	Stadium: Gamla Ullevi; Attendance: 17,340; Referee: Markus Strömbergsson (Gävle)

=== Svenska Cupen ===
==== 2014–15 ====
The tournament continued from the 2014 season.

Kickoff times are in UTC+1 unless stated otherwise.

===== Group stage =====
Pos	Team	Pld	W	D	L	GF	GA	GD	Pts	Qualification	IFKG	FCT	LSK	MYR
1	IFK Göteborg	3	2	1	0	13	2	+11	7	Advance to Knockout stage	—	—	5–0	—
2	FC Trollhättan	3	1	2	0	5	4	+1	5		2–2	—	—	2–1
3	Ljungskile SK	3	1	1	1	6	6	0	4		—	1–1	—	—
4	Myresjö/Vetlanda FK	3	0	0	3	1	13	−12	0		0–6	—	0–5	—

Source: svenskfotboll.se (in Swedish)
Rules for classification: 1) Points; 2) Goal difference; 3) Number of goals scored; 4) Head-to-head record; 5) Highest ranked team

21 February 2015 Matchday 1	FC Trollhättan	2–2	IFK Göteborg	Trollhättan
15:00	Bennhage 68'; Gustafsson 78'	Report	Rieks 36'; Boman 57'	Stadium: Edsborgs IP; Attendance: 2,417; Referee: Michael Lerjéus (Skövde)

28 February 2015 Matchday 2	Myresjö/Vetlanda FK	0–6	IFK Göteborg	Vetlanda
16:00		Report	Smedberg-Dalence 5' (pen.); Vibe 32', 41', 52'; Boman 40'; Bjärsmyr 65'	Stadium: Heds Arena; Attendance: 1,856; Referee: Kaspar Sjöberg (Malmö)

8 March 2015 Matchday 3	IFK Göteborg	5–0	Ljungskile SK	Gothenburg
14:00	Eriksson 37'; Pettersson 56'; Vibe 61', 62'; Salomonsson 75'	Report		Stadium: Valhalla IP; Attendance: 3,423; Referee: Kristoffer Karlsson (Höganäs)

===== Knockout stage =====
14 March 2015 Quarter-finals	IFK Göteborg	2–0	Helsingborgs IF	Gothenburg
16:00	Engvall 2'; Ankersen 80'	Report		Stadium: Gamla Ullevi; Attendance: 7,370; Referee: Johan Hamlin (Bro)

21 March 2015 Semi-finals	IFK Göteborg	3–1	BK Häcken	Gothenburg
16:00	Ankersen 25', 51'; Vibe 66'	Report	Rexhepi 82'	Stadium: Gamla Ullevi; Attendance: 7,458; Referee: Andreas Ekberg (Lund)

17 May 2015 Final	IFK Göteborg	2–1	Örebro SK	Gothenburg
15:30 UTC+2	Vibe 67'; Rieks 77'	Report	Nkili 23'	Stadium: Gamla Ullevi; Attendance: 16,761; Referee: Martin Strömbergsson (Gävle)

==== 2015–16 ====
The tournament continued into the 2016 season.

===== Qualification stage =====
19 August 2015 Round 2	Kristianstads FF	1–6	IFK Göteborg	Kristianstad
18:15 UTC+2	A. Ejupi 85'	Report	Pettersson 20'; Sköld 56', 61', 84'; Salomonsson 67' (pen.); Boman 71'	Stadium: Kristianstads IP; Attendance: 2,010; Referee: Robert Daradić (Helsingborg)

=== Svenska Supercupen ===
8 November 2015 Final	IFK Norrköping	3–0	IFK Göteborg	Norrköping
19:30 UTC+1	Fransson 3'; Nyman 15'; Kujović 43'	Report		Stadium: Nya Parken; Attendance: 2,662; Referee: Johan Hamlin (Bro)

=== UEFA Europa League ===
Kickoff times are in UTC+2 unless stated otherwise.

==== Qualifying phase and play-off round ====
===== Second qualifying round =====
16 July 2015 First leg	Śląsk Wrocław (Poland)	0–0	(Sweden) IFK Göteborg	Wrocław, Poland
20:30		Report		Stadium: Stadion Miejski; Attendance: 16,978; Referee: Jesús Gil Manzano (Spain)

23 July 2015 Second leg	IFK Göteborg (Sweden)	2–0 (2–0 agg.)	(Poland) Śląsk Wrocław	Gothenburg, Sweden
19:00	Engvall 55'; Boman 59'	Report		Stadium: Gamla Ullevi; Attendance: 10,823; Referee: Serdar Gözübüyük (Netherlands)

===== Third qualifying round =====
30 July 2015 First leg	Belenenses (Portugal)	2–1	(Sweden) IFK Göteborg	Lisbon, Portugal
20:00 UTC 0	Martins 23', 41'	Report	Aleesami 58'	Stadium: Estádio do Restelo; Attendance: 5,671; Referee: Vlado Glođović (Serbia)

6 August 2015 Second leg	IFK Göteborg (Sweden)	0–0 (1–2 agg.)	(Portugal) Belenenses	Gothenburg, Sweden
19:00		Report		Stadium: Gamla Ullevi; Attendance: 12,976; Referee: Jonathan Lardot (Belgium)

== Non-competitive ==
=== Pre-season ===
Kickoff times are in UTC+1 unless stated otherwise.

24 January 2015 Friendly	IFK Göteborg (Sweden)	1–1	(Denmark) FC Nordsjælland	Gothenburg, Sweden
14:00	Engvall 78'	Report	Baldvinsson 33'	Stadium: Valhalla IP; Attendance: 2,290; Referee: Bojan Pandžić (Gothenburg)

1 February 2015 The Atlantic Cup; Group stage	IFK Göteborg (Sweden)	3–1	(Czech Republic) Jablonec	Faro, Portugal
16:30 UTC 0	Vibe 10', 36'; Boman 12'	Report	Kopic 60'	Stadium: Estádio Algarve; Attendance: 28; Referee: Rui Oliveira (Portugal)

4 February 2015 The Atlantic Cup; Group stage	Dynamo Moscow (Russia)	2–0	(Sweden) IFK Göteborg	Faro, Portugal
16:30 UTC 0	Büttner 54'; Kurányi 90+3'	Report		Stadium: Estádio Algarve; Attendance: 5 Referee: André Moreira (Portugal)

7 February 2015 The Atlantic Cup; Third place match	IFK Göteborg (Sweden)	0–1	(Denmark) Brøndby IF	Albufeira, Portugal
21:00 UTC 0		Report	Phiri 44'	Stadium: Estádio Municipal; Attendance: 0 Referee: João Pinto (Portugal)

14 February 2015 Friendly	Copenhagen (Denmark)	1–1	(Sweden) IFK Göteborg	Copenhagen, Denmark
13:00	De Ridder 80'	Report	Engvall 68'	Stadium: Parken Stadium; Attendance: 0

26 March 2015 Friendly	IFK Göteborg (Sweden)	2–1	(Norway) Sarpsborg 08	Gothenburg, Sweden
16:00	Boman 12'; Mikkelsen 59'	Report	Wiig 51'	Stadium: Hjällbovallen; Attendance: 438; Referee: Michael Lerjéus (Skövde)

=== Mid-season ===
Kickoff times are in UTC+2.

22 June 2015 Friendly	IFK Göteborg	5–1	VB United	Ludvika, Sweden
18:30	Boman 10', 17'; Ankersen 59'; Bohm 64'; Bergman 78'	Report	Forsberg 84'	Stadium: ABB Arena; Attendance: 1,800

26 June 2015 Friendly	IFK Göteborg	2–0	Gefle IF	Dala-Floda, Sweden
19:00	Ankersen 18' (pen.), 22'	Report		Stadium: Flodavallen; Attendance: 450; Referee: Glenn Nyberg (Borlänge)
