= 2015 Svenska Supercupen =

- Event: Svenska Supercupen
IFK Norrköping	IFK Göteborg
3	0
- Date: 8 November 2015
- Venue: Nya Parken, Norrköping
- Referee: Johan Hamlin (Bro)
- Attendance: 2,662
- Weather: Clear; 4 °C (39 °F); 97% humidity

2015 Svenska Supercupen (Swedish Super Cup 2015), was the 9th and last edition Svenska Supercupen annual football match contested by the winners of the previous season's Allsvenskan and Svenska Cupen competitions. The match was played on 8 November 2015 at the Nya Parken, Norrköping, between the 2015 Allsvenskan champions, IFK Norrköping, and the 2014–15 Svenska Cupen winners IFK Göteborg. The match was IFK Göteborg's fifth appearance in the competition and their first since 2013. It was the first appearance for IFK Norrköping.

In Sweden the match was broadcast live on TV12. Johan Hamlin from Bro was the referee for match, his first time officiating the competition. IFK Norrköping won the match 3–0, scoring all three goals in the first half. The goal scorers were Alexander Fransson, Christoffer Nyman and Kujović.

== Background ==
IFK Göteborg qualified for Svenska Supercupen on 17 May 2015 when they won the 2015 Svenska Cupen Final against Örebro SK. They won the competition in 2008 and finished as runners-up in 2009, 2010 and in 2013.

The 2015 Allsvenskan champions, IFK Norrköping, qualified on 31 October, in the last round of Allsvenskan, when they secured their first league title in 26 years. This is the first time in Svenska Supercupen for IFK Norrköping, who had the home advantage as league winners, playing at Nya Parken, Norrköping.

== Match ==
8 November 2015
19:30 CET (UTC+1)

IFK Norrköping	3–0	IFK Göteborg
Fransson 3'; Nyman 15'; Kujović 43'	Report

Nya Parken, Norrköping
Attendance: 2,662
Referee: Johan Hamlin (Bro)

IFK Norrköping	IFK Göteborg

IFK Norrköping:
GK	91	(North Macedonia) David Mitov Nilsson
RB	6	(Sweden) Linus Wahlqvist		(substituted off) 46'
CB	4	(Sweden) Andreas Johansson (c)
CB	23	(Sweden) David Boo Wiklander		(substituted off) 46'
LB	30	(Croatia) Nikola Tkalčić
RM	14	(Sweden) Nicklas Bärkroth
CM	7	(Sweden) Alexander Fransson
CM	20	(Finland) Daniel Sjölund
LM	9	(Iceland) Arnór Ingvi Traustason	(yellow card) 55'	(substituted off) 76'
CF	10	(Sweden) Emir Kujović
CF	5	(Sweden) Christoffer Nyman
Substitutes:
GK	1	(Estonia) Andreas Vaikla
MF	8	(Sweden) Rawez Lawan
DF	11	(Sweden) Christopher Telo		(substituted in) 76'
DF	15	(Sweden) Marcus Falk-Olander		(substituted in) 46'
FW	16	(Sweden) Joel Enarsson
FW	17	(Sierra Leone) Alhaji Kamara
MF	25	(Sweden) Filip Dagerstål		(substituted in) 46'
Manager:
(Sweden) Janne Andersson

IFK Göteborg:
GK	1	(Sweden) John Alvbåge
RB	2	(Sweden) Emil Salomonsson
CB	30	(Sweden) Mattias Bjärsmyr (c)
CB	14	(Iceland) Hjálmar Jónsson
LB	4	(Norway) Haitam Aleesami	(yellow card) 73'
RM	9	(Denmark) Jakob Ankersen		(substituted off) 66'
CM	13	(Sweden) Gustav Svensson
CM	24	(Sweden) Tom Pettersson		(substituted off) 66'
LM	8	(Denmark) Søren Rieks
SS	7	(Denmark) Mads Albæk
CF	19	(Sweden) Gustav Engvall		(substituted off) 86'
Substitutes:
GK	12	(Sweden) Marcus Sandberg
FW	10	(Finland) Riku Riski		(substituted in) 66'
FW	16	(Sweden) Mikael Boman
MF	17	(Ghana) Prosper Kasim		(substituted in) 86'
FW	20	(Sweden) Victor Sköld		(substituted in) 66'
DF	22	(Sweden) Adam Johansson
DF	27	(Sweden) Billy Nordström
Manager:
(Sweden) Jörgen Lennartsson

MATCH OFFICIALS

- Assistant referees:
  - Björn Lindroth (Borlänge)
  - Mahbod Beigi (Sandviken)
- Fourth official:
  - Johan Krantz (Uppsala)

MATCH RULES

- 90 minutes.
- 30 minutes of extra-time if necessary.
- Penalty shoot-out if scores still level.
- Seven named substitutes.
- Maximum of three substitutions.

=== Statistics ===
Overall	IFK Norrköping	IFK Göteborg
Goals scored	3	0
Total shots	16	5
Shots on target	7	2
Ball possession	57%	43%
Corner kicks	1	2
Fouls committed	7	9
Offsides	4	2
Yellow cards	1	1
Red cards	0	0

== See also ==
- 2015 Allsvenskan
- 2014–15 Svenska Cupen
- 2015 IFK Norrköping season
- 2015 IFK Göteborg season
