= 2015 Svenska Cupen final =

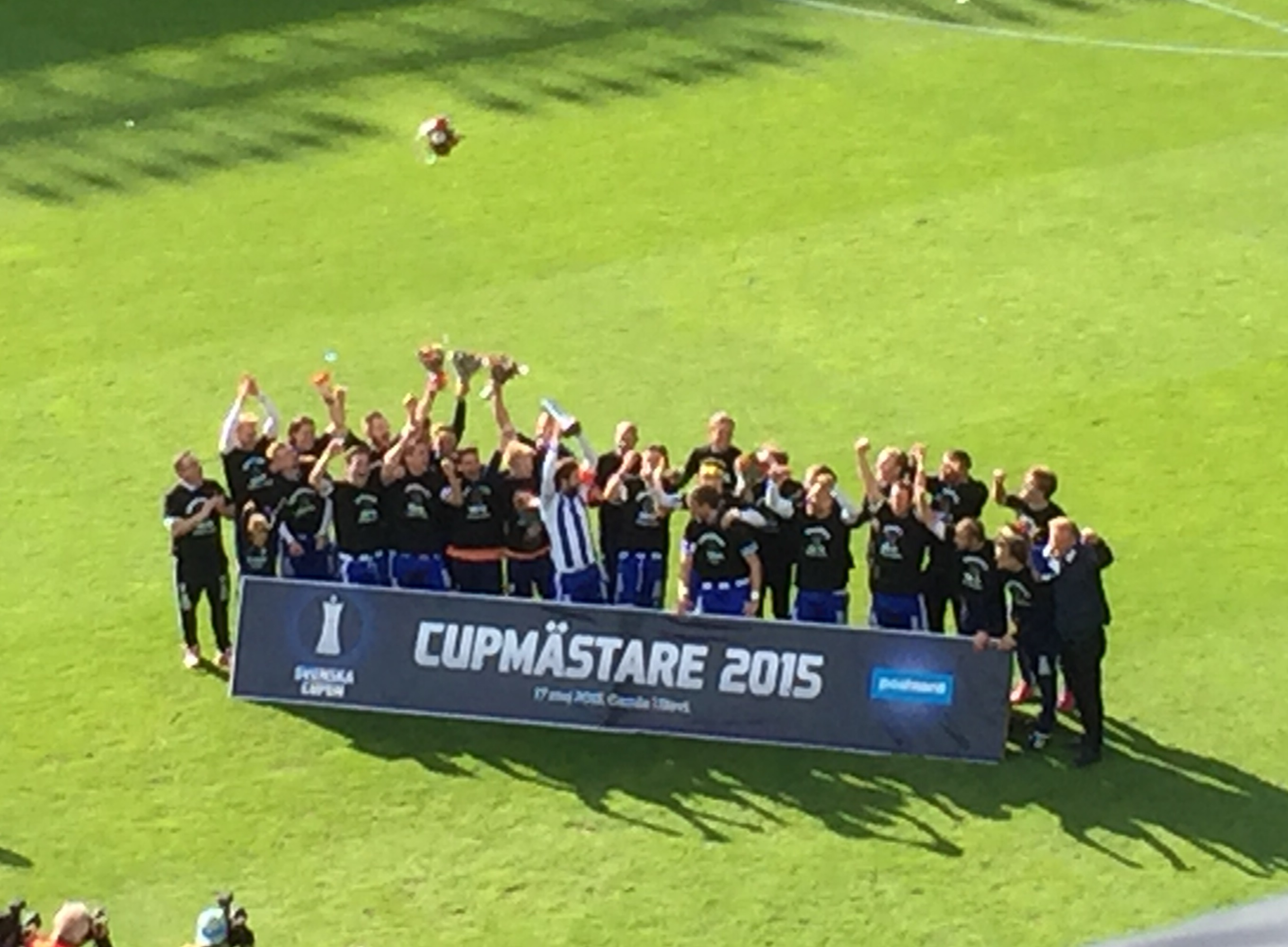
- Event: 2014–15 Svenska Cupen
IFK Göteborg	Örebro SK
2	1
- Date: 17 May 2015
- Venue: Gamla Ullevi, Gothenburg
- Referee: Martin Strömbergsson (Gävle)
- Attendance: 16,761
- Weather: Cloudy; 11 °C (52 °F); 61% humidity

The 2015 Svenska Cupen Final was played on 17 May 2015. The match was played at Gamla Ullevi, the home ground of IFK Göteborg. It was the first time since 2011 that one of the final teams had a home ground instead of playing at the Friends Arena in Solna National Stadium. It was the first time since 2000 that the final was played in Gothenburg and the first time it was played in Gamla Ullevi. The final was the culmination of the 2014–15 Svenska Cupen. Allsvenskan clubs IFK Göteborg and Örebro SK contested the 2015 final. In Sweden, the match was televised live on SVT.

IFK Göteborg won their seventh Svenska Cupen title after defeating Örebro SK 2–1.

== Route to the final ==
Note: In all results below, the score of the finalist is given first.

IFK Göteborg		Round	Örebro SK	
Opponent	Result	Qualifying stage	Opponent	Result
Assyriska Turabdin IK	5–0 (A)	Round 2	Eskilstuna City	2–0 (A)
Opponent	Result	Group stage	Opponent	Result
FC Trollhättan	2–2 (A)	Matchday 1	Varbergs BoIS	3–3 (H)
Myresjö/Vetlanda FK	6–0 (A)	Matchday 2	Dalkurd FF	1–0 (A)
Ljungskile SK	5–0 (H)	Matchday 3	Gefle IF	2–1 (H)
Group 2 winner: Pos / Team / Pld / Pts; 1 / IFK Göteborg / 3 / 7; 2 / FC Trollhättan / 3 / 5; 3 / Ljungskile SK / 3 / 4; 4 / Myresjö/Vetlanda FK / 3 / 0; Source: svenskfotboll.se (in Swedish)		Final standings	Group 6 winner: Pos / Team / Pld / Pts; 1 / Örebro SK / 3 / 7; 2 / Gefle IF / 3 / 6; 3 / Varbergs BoIS / 3 / 4; 4 / Dalkurd FF / 3 / 0; Source: svenskfotboll.se (in Swedish)	
Opponent	Result	Knockout stage	Opponent	Result
Helsingborgs IF	2–0 (H)	Quarter-finals	Malmö FF	1–0 (A)
BK Häcken	3–1 (H)	Semi-finals	IF Elfsborg	2–0 (H)

== Match ==
=== Details ===
17 May 2015
15:30 UTC+2

IFK Göteborg	2–1	Örebro SK
Vibe 67'; Rieks 77'	Report	Nkili 23'

Gamla Ullevi, Gothenburg
Attendance: 16,761
Referee: Martin Strömbergsson (Gävle)

IFK Göteborg	Örebro SK

GK	1	(Sweden) John Alvbåge
RB	2	(Sweden) Emil Salomonsson
CB	30	(Sweden) Mattias Bjärsmyr (c)
CB	28	(Norway) Thomas Rogne
LB	4	(Norway) Haitam Aleesami
RM	9	(Denmark) Jakob Ankersen	(substituted off) 82'
CM	13	(Sweden) Gustav Svensson
CM	6	(Sweden) Sebastian Eriksson
LM	8	(Denmark) Søren Rieks
FW	16	(Sweden) Mikael Boman	(substituted off) 69'
FW	29	(Denmark) Lasse Vibe
Substitutes:
GK	12	(Sweden) Marcus Sandberg
DF	3	(United States) Heath Pearce
MF	11	(Bolivia) Martin Smedberg-Dalence
DF	14	(Iceland) Hjálmar Jónsson
FW	15	(Denmark) Thomas Mikkelsen
FW	19	(Sweden) Gustav Engvall	(substituted in) 69'
DF	24	(Sweden) Tom Pettersson	(substituted in) 82'
Manager:
(Sweden) Jörgen Lennartsson

GK	1	(Sweden) Oscar Jansson
RB	12	(Sweden) Daniel Björnquist
CB	5	(Sweden) Erik Moberg
CB	27	(Iceland) Eiður Sigurbjörnsson
LB	2	(Sweden) Patrik Haginge
RM	9	(Iraq) Ahmed Yasin
CM	3	(South Africa) Ayanda Nkili	(yellow card) 72'	(substituted off) 79'
CM	6	(Sweden) Robert Åhman Persson (c)
LM	90	(Sweden) Daniel Gustavsson		(substituted off) 82'
FW	17	(Sweden) Karl Holmberg		(substituted off) 79'
FW	25	(Sweden) Nordin Gerzić
Substitutes:
GK	33	(Sweden) Karl Westdahl
DF	4	(Iceland) Logi Valgarðsson
FW	7	(Jamaica) Michael Seaton		(substituted in) 82'
FW	11	(Sweden) Marcus Pode		(substituted in) 79'
MF	16	(Sweden) Daniel Nordmark		(substituted in) 79'
DF	21	(Sweden) Christoffer Wiktorsson
DF	23	(Ghana) Samuel Mensah
Manager:
(Sweden) Alexander Axén

Assistant referees:
Daniel Gustavsson (Mantorp)
Joakim Flink (Karlskrona)
Fourth official:
Mohammed Al-Hakim (Köping)

Match rules

- 90 minutes.
- 30 minutes of extra time if necessary.
- Penalty shoot-out if scores still level.
- Seven named substitutes.
- Maximum of three substitutions.

=== Statistics ===
Overall	IFK Göteborg	Örebro SK
Goals scored	2	1
Total shots	17	6
Shots on target	8	2
Ball possession	55%	45%
Corner kicks	9	4
Fouls committed	5	15
Offsides	0	1
Yellow cards	0	1
Red cards	0	0

== See also ==
- 2014–15 Svenska Cupen
