= Ilir Berisha =

Kosovan footballer (born 1991)

Personal information
- Date of birth: 25 June 1991 (age 35)
- Place of birth: Pristina, kosovo
- Height: 1.87 m (6 ft 2 in)
- Position: Centre-back

Team information
- Current team: Karlstad
- Number: 5

Youth career
- –2009: Prishtina

Senior career*
Years	Team	Apps	(Gls)
2009–2012	Prishtina	26	(0)
2012–2014	Örebro	37	(4)
2015–2016	Gefle	7	(2)
2016–2017	Flamurtari	17	(1)
2017–2019	Västerås	50	(6)
2019–2020	Feronikeli	12	(2)
2020	→ Prishtina (loan)	0	(0)
2021	Vitia		
2021–2022	Ljungskile	34	(1)
2023–	Karlstad	16	(0)

International career^{‡}
2014–2015	Kosovo	3	(0)
- * Club domestic league appearances and goals as of 29 November 2023 ‡ National team caps and goals as of 13 November 2015

Ilir Berisha (born 25 June 1991) is a Kosovan professional footballer who plays as a centre-back for Swedish club Karlstad.

== Club career ==
=== Örebro ===
On 19 February 2012, Berisha signed a multi-year contract with Allsvenskan club Örebro and received squad number 5. On 13 May 2012, he was named as a Örebro substitute for the first time in a league match against Norrköping. His debut with Örebro came three days later in a 2–2 home draw against AIK after being named in the starting line-up. On 9 July 2012, he scored his first goal in a 2–1 home win over Malmö.

He finished the 2012 season with a total of 20 appearances (including one made it in the Swedish Cup), in where 18 was as a starter and also with a total of 3 goals. However his performance and goals weren't enough, as the team were relegated to Superettan.

==== 2013 season ====
On 15 April 2013, Berisha commenced his second season with a win in league match against GIF Sundsvall after coming on as a substitute at 81st minute in place of Ayanda Nkili. One month later, he scored his first goal at season in a 2–0 home win over Degerfors.

The latest match of the 2013 season was on 26 June 2013 against Ljungskile finished in the victory 1–0, as Berisha injured and finished the season, where he registered a total of 12 appearances and scoring 1 goal, and the team gained promotion to the Allsvenskan after they were placed as runners-up.

==== 2014 season ====
On 25 April 2014, Berisha was named as a Örebro substitute for the first time after return from 10-months injury in a league match against Åtvidaberg. On 30 May 2014, he played the first game after the return against Djurgården after coming on as a substitute at 71st minute in place of Ayanda Nkili.

On 31 October 2014, Berisha announced that will left Örebro at the end of the season. One day later, he played his last match for Örebro against Häcken after coming on as a substitute at 89th minute in place of Magnus Wikström.

=== Gefle ===
On 23 March 2015, Berisha signed a two-year contract with Allsvenskan club Gefle. Thirteen days later, he was named as a Gefle substitute for the first time in a league match against Falkenberg. His debut with Gefle came three days later in a 2–0 home win against Kalmar after coming on as a substitute at last minutes in place of Johan Bertilsson.

=== Flamurtari ===
On 13 January 2016, Berisha joined Kategoria Superiore side Flamurtari. On 7 September 2016, he made his debut in a 2–1 away defeat against Skënderbeu Korçë after being named in the starting line-up.

=== Västerås ===
On 24 July 2017, Berisha signed a one-year and a half contract with Ettan club Västerås. One month later, he made his debut in a 1–0 away defeat against Brage after being named in the starting line-up.

=== Feronikeli ===
On 13 December 2019, Berisha joined Football Superleague of Kosovo side Feronikeli. Two months later, he made his debut with Feronikeli in 2019–20 Kosovar Cup quarter-final against Liria after being named in the starting line-up.

== International career ==
Berisha received Albanian citizenship on 24 May 2013, among other compatriots, Amir Abrashi, Vullnet Basha, Azdren Llullaku and Jurgen Gjasula, so he was able to play for the Albania national team in international games. After an emergency for replacing Lorik Cana due to a suspend cause of number cards, Berisha had given the interest of coach Gianni De Biasi for him as choice for the game against Norway on 7 June 2013. He received a call-up by the national team's coach De Biasi for the match against Norway on 7 June 2013, but he was unused for that match and sat on the bench.

Due to an accord between the Albania's coach Gianni De Biasi and the Kosovo national team's coach Albert Bunjaki, Berisha were called up for the first time at his birthplace country Kosovo for the friendly match against Oman on 7 September 2014. Berisha debuted for Kosovo by playing full 90 minutes in a 1–0 victory against Oman at Pristina City Stadium.

== Career statistics ==
=== Club ===
As of 8 October 2017

Appearances and goals by club, season and competition
Club	Season	League			Cup		Europe (Note: Includes continental competitions, such as UEFA Champions League and UEFA Europa League)		Other		Total	
Club	Season	Division	Apps	Goals	Apps	Goals	Apps	Goals	Apps	Goals	Apps	Goals
Örebro SK	2012	Allsvenskan	19	3	1	0	—		—		20	3
Örebro SK	2013	Superettan	12	1	—		—		—		12	1
Örebro SK	2014	Allsvenskan	5	0	1	0	—		—		6	0
Örebro SK	Total		36	4	2	0	—		—		38	4
Gefle IF	2015	Allsvenskan	7	2	1	0	—		—		8	2
Flamurtari Vlorë	2016–17	Albanian Superliga	17	1	1	0	—		—		18	1
Västerås SK	2017	Division 1 (Swedish football)	8	2	—		—		—		8	2
Career total			68	9	4	0	—		—		72	9

=== International ===
As of 13 November 2015

Appearances and goals by national team and year
National team	Year	Apps	Goals
Albania	2013	0	0
Total		0	0
Kosovo	2014	1	0
Kosovo	2015	2	0
Total		3	0
