= Nkili =

Nkili is a surname. Notable people with the surname include:

- Ayanda Nkili (born 1990), South African footballer
- Noël Aséko Nkili (born 2005), German footballer
