= Lasse Vibe =

Danish footballer (born 1987)

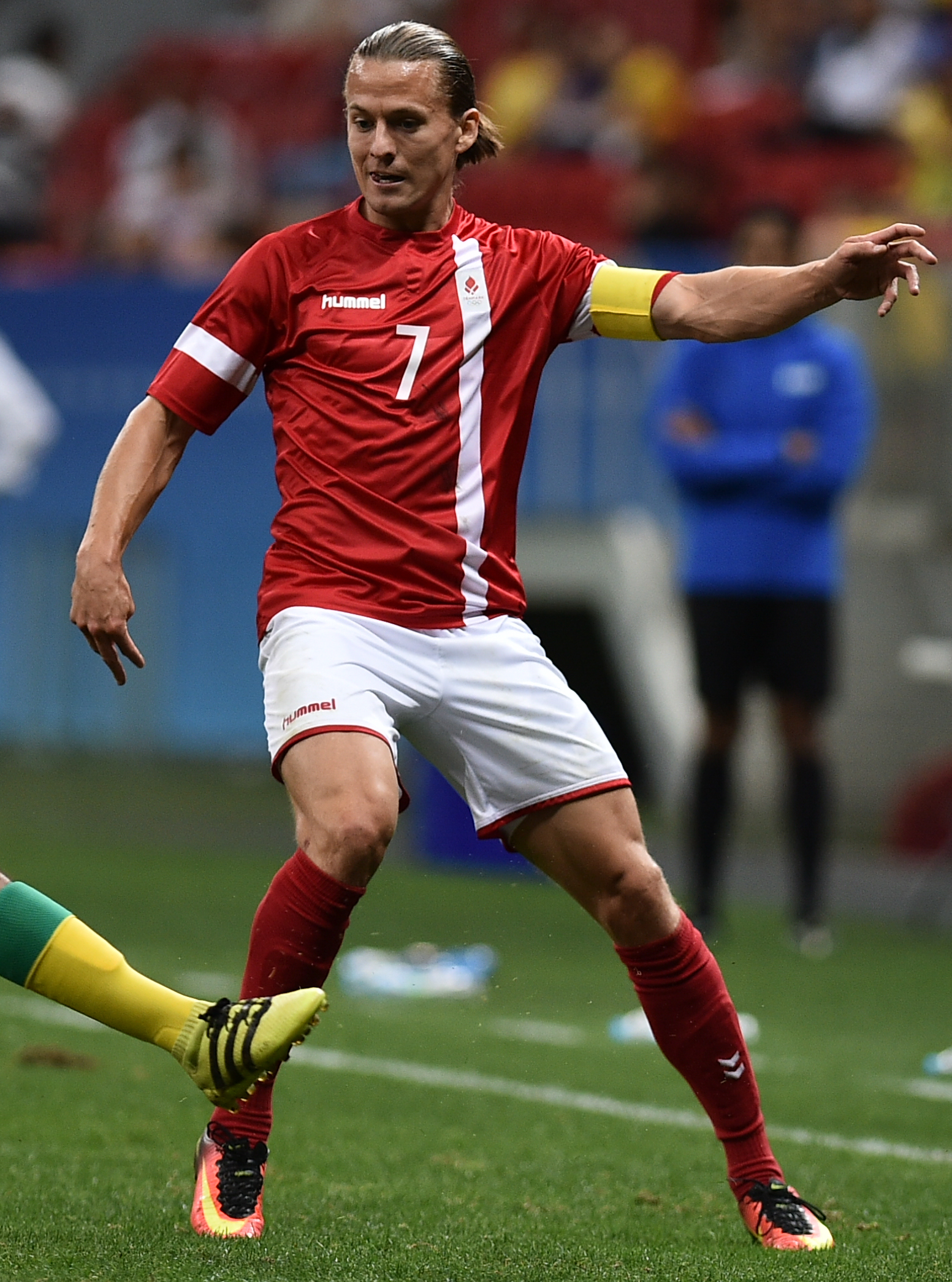
- Vibe playing for Denmark at the 2016 Olympics

Personal information
- Full name: Lasse Vibe
- Date of birth: 22 February 1987 (age 39)
- Place of birth: Aarhus, Denmark
- Height: 1.81 m (5 ft 11 in)
- Positions: Forward; winger

Youth career
- 1992–2000: AIA-Tranbjerg
- 2001–2002: AGF
- 2003: AIA-Tranbjerg
- 2004–2005: AGF

Senior career*
Years	Team	Apps	(Gls)
2005–2008	AGF II		
2007–2008	AGF	1	(0)
2009–2010	FC Fyn	45	(12)
2010–2011	FC Vestsjælland	43	(17)
2012–2013	SønderjyskE	47	(19)
2013–2015	IFK Göteborg	56	(31)
2015–2018	Brentford	94	(36)
2018–2019	Changchun Yatai	11	(1)
2019	IFK Göteborg	20	(5)
2020–2021	FC Midtjylland	20	(3)
Total		337	(125)

International career
2016	Denmark Olympic	4	(0)
2014–2017	Denmark	11	(1)
- * Club domestic league appearances and goals

Lasse Vibe (born 22 February 1987) is a Danish former professional footballer who played as a forward or winger.

After beginning his career throughout his native Denmark, Vibe came to prominence in Sweden with IFK Göteborg between 2013 and 2015, and later played in England and China. After a brief spell with FC Midtjylland, he retired from football in 2021.

Vibe was a Denmark international and captained the 2016 Denmark Olympic team.

== Club career ==
=== AGF ===
Vibe began his career in his native Denmark with local club AIA-Tranberg, before moving to AGF in 2001. He returned to AIA-Tranberg for a spell in 2003, before returning to AGF the following year. He progressed through AGF's youth system to become captain of the youth team and on 8 August 2005 it was reported that he had signed a two-year professional contract. A persistent knee injury hindered Vibe's progression from the youth to the reserve team during the 2005–06 Danmarksserien season. After a successful recovery, he made his professional debut on the final day of the 2006–07 1. division season in a 3–1 defeat to Hobro IK, though the result was irrelevant as promotion to the Superliga was already secured. On 28 June 2007, Vibe signed a new two-year contract.

Vibe failed to feature for the first team during the 2007–08 season and had to wait until 23 August 2008 to make his next appearance, which came in a DBU Pokalen second round match versus Viby IF. He came on as a 54th-minute substitute and scored his first goal for the club two minutes later, before adding another in injury time to cap an 8–0 win. Vibe departed the club in December 2008, with sporting director Brian Steen Nielsen admitting that he needed to move on for the sake of his career.

=== FC Fyn ===
In December 2008, Vibe signed a contract with 2. division West club FC Fyn, effective from 1 January 2009. He hit the ground running, scoring seven goals in 13 games in the second half of the 2008–09 season and he won the first silverware of his career when Fyn won the division title, which sealed promotion to the 1. division. Vibe began his first full season of first team football as a regular, but ended the 2009–10 campaign with just seven goals from 31 appearances as Fyn finished safely in mid-table. He departed the club after the season and scored 14 goals in 44 appearances during 18 months at the Odense Atletikstadion.

=== FC Vestsjælland ===
In February 2010, it was reported that Vibe had signed a contract with 1. division club FC Vestsjælland, effective 1 July 2010. He scored 11 goals in 29 appearances during his debut season, in which the Vikings finished in mid-table. Vibe scored six goals in 15 appearances during the first half of the 2011–12 season, before departing the club in December 2011.

=== SønderjyskE ===
In December 2011, Vibe moved up to the Superliga to sign a two-year contract with SønderjyskE, effective 1 January 2012. He had to wait until March 2012 to make his debut and played the opening 66 minutes of a 1–0 defeat to Brøndby IF, before being substituted for Bjørn Paulsen. He came into form in mid-April and scored five goals in a six-match spell. He finished the 2011–12 season with six goals from 15 appearances. Vibe made 34 appearances and scored 13 goals during the 2012–13 season (scoring eight of those goals in the space of 11 matches) and departed the club in June 2013, despite having signed a new 3 1/2 year contract in December 2012. Vibe made 49 appearances and scored 19 goals during 18 months at the Haderslev Fodboldstadion.

=== IFK Göteborg ===
Vibe moved to Sweden to sign for Allsvenskan club IFK Göteborg in June 2013. He scored his first goal for the club in a 4–0 Svenska Cupen second round win over Lunds BK on 22 August. He was denied his first Swedish silverware after an injury time Guillermo Molins goal secured a 3–2 victory for Malmö FF in the 2013 Svenska Supercupen. Vibe finished the 2013 season with 22 appearances, four goals and helped Göteborg to third place in the table and qualification for the Europa League.

Vibe was in prolific goalscoring form during the 2014 season, scoring 32 goals in 38 appearances and finishing the season as the Allsvenskan's top scorer. He was nominated for the 2014 Danish Player of the Year award, but lost to Tottenham Hotspur's Christian Eriksen. Vibe scored 7 goals during Göteborg's victorious 2014–15 Svenska Cupen campaign, which included the opening goal in a 2–1 win over Örebro SK in the final on 17 May 2015. He left the club on 24 July 2015, after having scored 42 goals in 77 appearances for the Angels.

=== Brentford ===
==== 2015–16 season ====
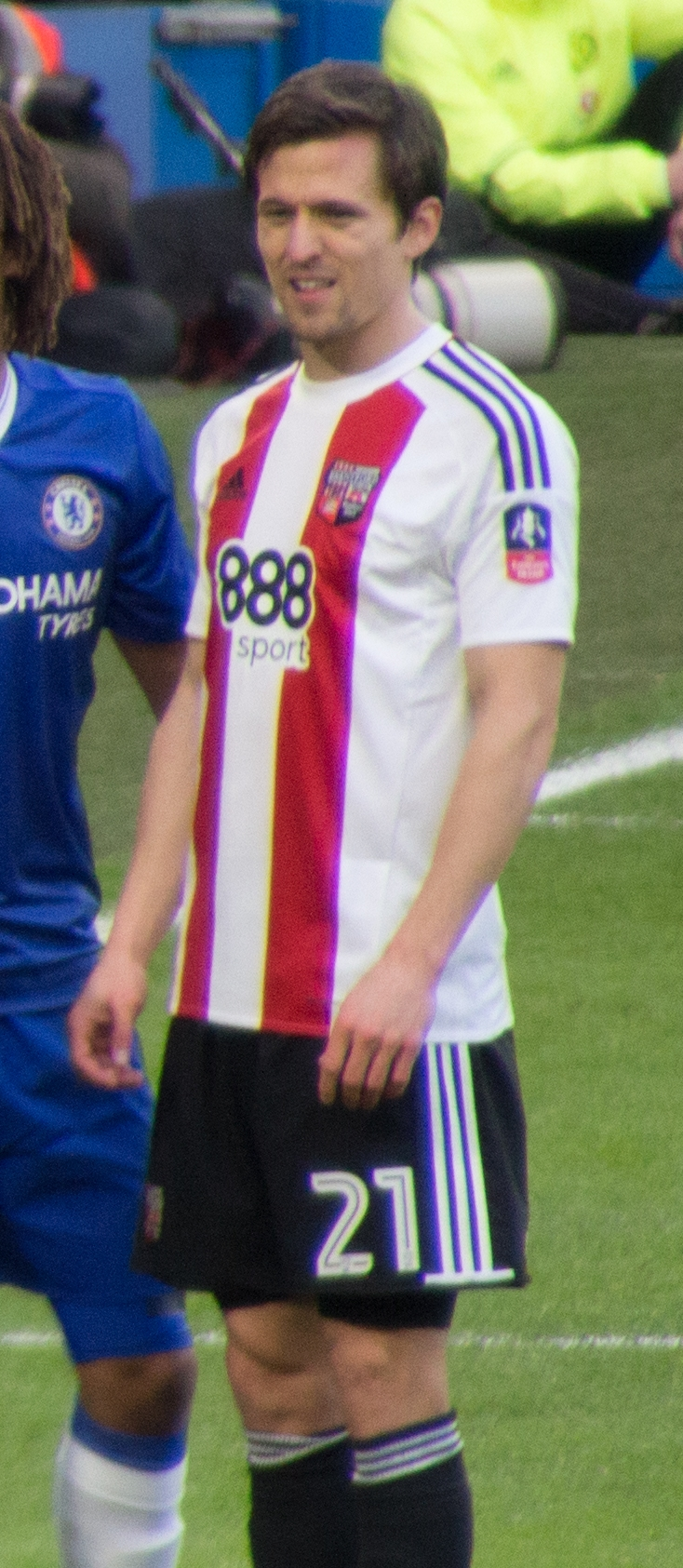
Vibe playing for Brentford in 2017.

On 24 July 2015, it was announced that Vibe had moved to England to sign a three-year contract with Championship club Brentford for a €1.3 million fee. The departure of forward Andre Gray on 21 August opened up a place in the starting lineup for Vibe, albeit as a winger. Despite being deployed out wide, he scored five goals in 11 games before injury to Marco Djuricin in November 2015 led interim coach Lee Carsley move Vibe into the team's lone striker position. After the switch, he scored just twice more prior to Christmas and then entered a lengthy goal drought, due to the struggling midfield leaving him increasingly isolated up front and the effects of nearly 18 months of constant football. He finally came back into form in the final five weeks of the season and went on a run of scoring seven goals in as many matches. Vibe made 42 appearances during 2015–16 season and scoring 14 goals, which tied him with Alan Judge as Brentford's top scorer.

==== 2016–17 season ====
After an extended spell away on international duty, Vibe returned in time for Brentford's fifth match of the 2016–17 season versus Rotherham United. One week later, he scored his first goal of the season against Sheffield Wednesday, but was sent off late in the 1–1 draw. He scored again in a 4–1 win over Reading on 27 September 2016, but was ruled out after suffering damaged ankle ligaments during a 0–0 draw with Wigan Athletic on 1 October. Vibe regained his starting place on his return in early November, but as in the previous season, he suffered a goal drought and failed to score again until 7 January 2017, when he deputised for the injured Scott Hogan as the team's lone forward in an FA Cup third round victory over Eastleigh. The continuing unavailability of Hogan and then his departure at the end of the January transfer window saw Vibe keep the lone forward role and he returned to form, scoring 14 goals in 21 matches between 7 January and the end of the season. He finished the season as Brentford's top scorer, with 16 goals from 36 appearances.

==== 2017–18 season ====
The early part of Vibe's 2017–18 season was disrupted by nearly two months on the sidelines due to a foot injury suffered during a 2–0 defeat to Ipswich Town on 19 August 2017. He scored his first goals of the season with seven in an eight-match spell from November through to January and was nominated for the December PFA Championship Fans' Player of the Month award. The run of goals was Vibe's last for the club and he departed Griffin Park on 10 February 2018. During 2 1/2 seasons with Brentford, Vibe made 97 appearances and scored 37 goals.

=== Changchun Yatai ===
On 10 February 2018, Vibe transferred to Chinese Super League club Changchun Yatai for an undisclosed fee, speculated to be £2 million. In a disastrous 2018 season, which culminated in relegation to China League One, Vibe made just 11 appearances and scored one goal. He was given a free transfer by the club after the season.

=== Return to IFK Göteborg ===
On 3 April 2019, Vibe returned to Allsvenskan club IFK Göteborg on a one-year contract, with the option for a further year. He made 21 appearances and scored six goals during a mid-table 2019 season and was voted that season's Archangel by the club's supporters. Vibe departed IFK Göteborg at the end of the season and across his two spells, made 98 appearances and scored 52 goals.

=== FC Midtjylland ===
On 4 November 2019, it was announced that in January 2020, Vibe would transfer to Danish Superliga club FC Midtjylland on an 18-month contract. During what remained of the club's 2019–20 championship-winning season, he made 13 appearances and scored two goals. Vibe made 12 appearances and scored two goals during the 2020–21 season and retired at the end of the campaign.

== International career ==
=== Youth ===
Vibe was called into a Denmark U19 squad while a youth, but did not play. In July 2016, he was called up to the Denmark 2016 Summer Olympics squad as one of three overage players and was named as captain of the team shortly before the tournament. He made four appearances and scored no goals in the tournament as Denmark were knocked out by Nigeria in the quarter-finals.

=== Full ===
Following good goalscoring form for SønderjyskE, Vibe he received his maiden call-up to the senior Danish national team for a friendly match against Slovakia on 8 August 2012. He was an unused substitute during the 3–1 defeat. His debut came just over two years later, against Turkey in a friendly on 3 September 2014, in which Vibe replaced Thomas Kahlenberg in the 64th minute of the 2–1 defeat. Four days later, Vibe made his competitive debut for Denmark in a 2–1 win over Armenia in Euro 2016 qualifying. He scored his first international goal in the following match, an 81st-minute equaliser in a 1–1 draw with Albania in Elbasan. Vibe was announced as a member of the Denmark squad for the 2016 Kirin Cup, but did not play due to injury. Vibe's international career ended in 2017, by which time he had won 11 caps and scored one goal. Unlike his natural forward position at club level, Vibe found himself utilised as a winger at international level.

== Personal life ==
Vibe has twin children and his older brother Rasmus is also a footballer. Alongside football, Vibe played handball until the age of 16, before deciding to concentrate on football full-time. Already possessing a bachelor's degree, Vibe studied for a master's degree in finance and accounting at Aarhus BSS and completed his studies in 2015. In 2020, while still a professional footballer, Vibe joined financial services firm Imperium Family Office as a partner and financial advisor.

== Career statistics ==
=== Club ===
Appearances and goals by club, season and competition
Club	Season	League			National cup (Note: Includes Danish Cup, Svenska Cupen, FA Cup)		League cup (Note: Includes EFL Cup)		Europe		Other		Total	
Club	Season	Division	Apps	Goals	Apps	Goals	Apps	Goals	Apps	Goals	Apps	Goals	Apps	Goals
AGF	2006–07	1. division	1	0	0	0	—		—		—		1	0
AGF	2008–09	Danish Superliga	0	0	1	2	—		—		—		1	2
AGF	Total		1	0	1	2	—		—		—		2	2
FC Fyn	2008–09	2. division West	13	7	—		—		—		—		13	7
FC Fyn	2009–10	1. division	30	7	1	0	—		—		—		31	7
FC Fyn	Total		43	14	1	0	—		—		—		44	14
FC Vestsjælland	2010–11	1. division	29	11	0	0	—		—		—		29	11
FC Vestsjælland	2011–12	1. division	14	6	1	0	—		—		—		15	6
FC Vestsjælland	Total		43	17	1	0	—		—		—		44	17
SønderjyskE	2011–12	Danish Superliga	14	6	1	0	—		—		—		15	6
SønderjyskE	2012–13	Danish Superliga	33	13	1	0	—		—		—		34	13
SønderjyskE	Total		47	19	2	0	—		—		—		49	19
IFK Göteborg	2013	Allsvenskan	14	2	5	1	—		2 (Note: Appearances in Europa League)	0	1 (Note: Appearance in Svenska Supercupen)	1	22	4
IFK Göteborg	2014	Allsvenskan	26	23	6	7	—		6	2	—		38	32
IFK Göteborg	2015	Allsvenskan	16	6	—		—		1	0	—		17	6
IFK Göteborg	Total		56	31	11	8	—		9	2	1	1	77	42
Brentford	2015–16	Championship	41	14	0	0	1	0	—		—		42	14
Brentford	2016–17	Championship	34	15	2	1	—		—		—		36	16
Brentford	2017–18	Championship	19	7	0	0	0	0	—		—		19	7
Brentford	Total		94	36	2	1	1	0	—		—		97	37
Changchun Yatai	2018	Chinese Super League	11	1	0	0	—		—		—		11	1
IFK Göteborg	2019	Allsvenskan	20	5	1	1	—		—		—		21	6
FC Midtjylland	2019–20	Danish Superliga	13	2	—		—		—		—		13	2
FC Midtjylland	2020–21	Danish Superliga	7	1	2	1	—		3 (Note: Appearances in Champions League)	0	—		12	2
FC Midtjylland	Total		20	3	2	1	—		3	0	—		25	4
Career total			301	126	20	13	1	0	12	2	1	1	366	142

=== International ===
Appearances and goals by national team and year
National team	Year	Apps	Goals
Denmark	2014	6	1
Denmark	2015	3	0
Denmark	2016	1	0
Denmark	2017	1	0
Total		11	1

Scores and results list Denmark's goal tally first, score column indicates score after each Vibe goal.

List of international goals scored by Lasse Vibe
No.	Date	Venue	Opponent	Score	Result	Competition	Ref.
1	11 October 2014	Ruzhdi Bizhuta Stadium, Elbasan	Albania	1–1	1–1	UEFA Euro 2016 qualifying	

== Honours ==
FC Fyn

- 2. division West: 2008–09

IFK Göteborg

- Svenska Cupen: 2014–15

FC Midtjylland

- Danish Superliga: 2019–20

Individual

- Allsvenskan top scorer: 2014
- Svenska Cupen top scorer: 2014–15
- IFK Göteborg Archangel: 2019
