= Thomas Rogne =

Norwegian footballer (born 1990)

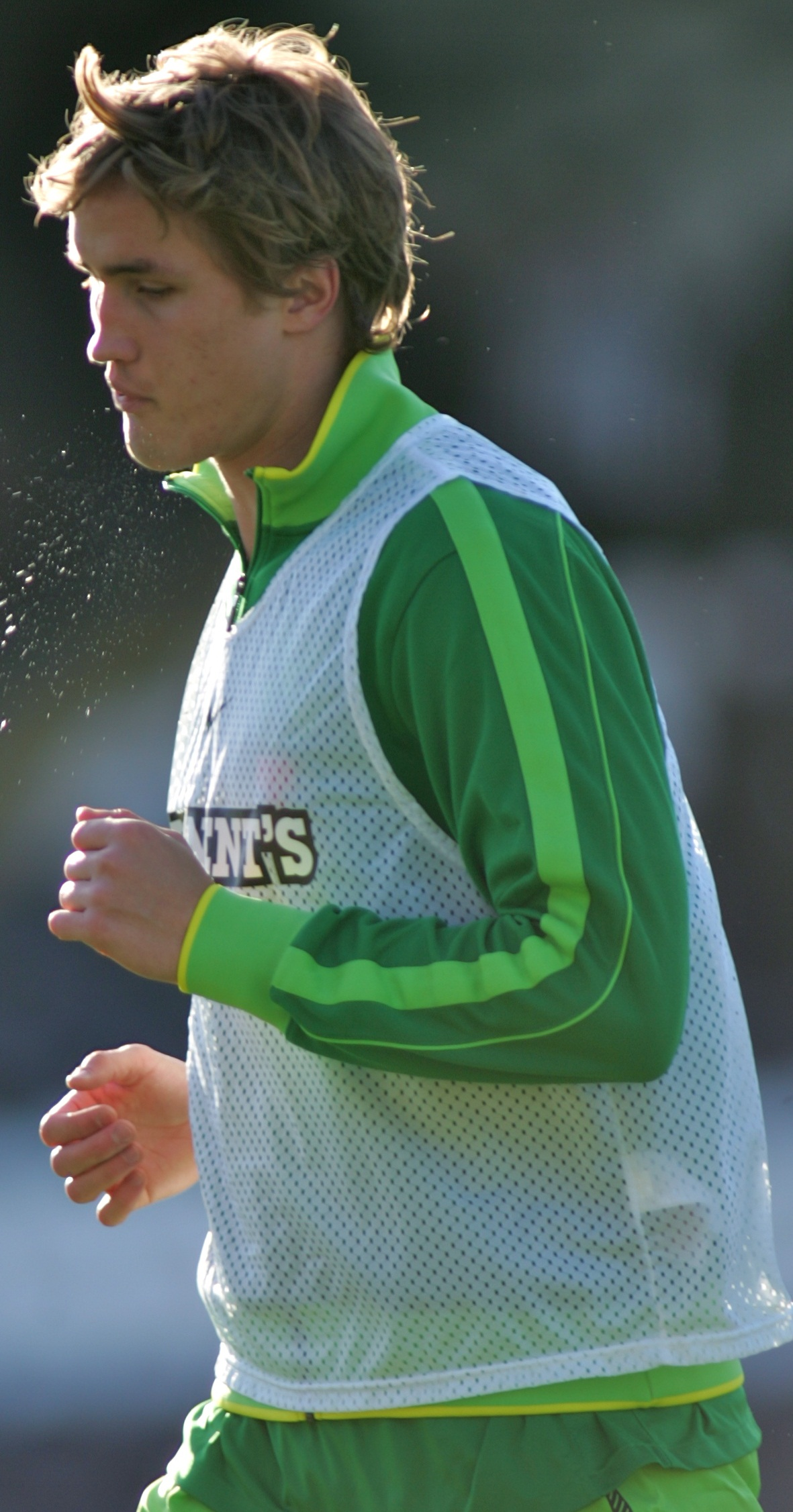
- Rogne warming up for Celtic in 2010

Personal information
- Full name: Thomas Pauck Rogne
- Date of birth: 29 June 1990 (age 36)
- Place of birth: Bærum, Norway
- Height: 1.93 m (6 ft 4 in)
- Position: Centre-back

Youth career
- Lommedalens IL
- –2007: Stabæk

Senior career*
Years	Team	Apps	(Gls)
2007–2009	Stabæk	13	(1)
2009	Stabæk 2	1	(0)
2010–2013	Celtic	50	(2)
2013–2015	Wigan Athletic	12	(0)
2015–2017	IFK Göteborg	66	(1)
2018–2021	Lech Poznań II	12	(1)
2018–2021	Lech Poznań	62	(4)
2022	Apollon Smyrnis	15	(0)
2022–2024	Helsingborgs IF	47	(2)
Total		278	(11)

International career
2009	Norway U19	4	(0)
2009–2013	Norway U21	17	(2)
2012	Norway	2	(0)
- * Club domestic league appearances and goals

Thomas Pauck Rogne (born 29 June 1990) is a Norwegian former professional footballer who played as a centre-back. During his professional career, he represented Stabæk, Celtic, Wigan Athletic, IFK Göteborg, Lech Poznań, Apollon Smyrnis, and Helsingborgs IF. Rogne has also been capped for the Norway national team.

== Club career ==
=== Stabæk ===
Rogne started his career with Norwegian club Stabæk. He missed the entire 2008 season after tearing the anterior cruciate ligament in his knee in a pre-season friendly against Russian side Krylia Sovetov in La Manga. He played for Stabæk in UEFA Champions League qualifying matches against Copenhagen and Valencia, and also represented the club in the Europa League.

=== Celtic ===
Rogne signed for Celtic on 20 January 2010, and joined on a three-and-a-half-year contract. Rogne was given the number 25 shirt.

On 10 February 2010, Rogne made his Celtic debut coming on as a substitute for Glenn Loovens in a 2–0 home win against Hearts in the SPL. He made his first start for Celtic at home against Dundee United in a 1–0 victory on 20 February 2010, he played very well and impressed the coach Tony Mowbray. Rogne impressed against Rangers on 28 February 2010 but was taken off due to a hamstring injury. He returned two months later in an away game against Dundee United but once again had to leave the field early through injury.

Rogne made his first competitive start of the 2010–11 season for Celtic against St Johnstone in a 3–0 win. In the following game he was sent off for a professional foul against Aberdeen. Despite this, Celtic went on to win the game by a record-breaking 9–0 score. He scored his first goal for Celtic in a 1–1 draw against Kilmarnock in December 2010. Rogne won many plaudits for his performance as Celtic beat Rangers 2–0 at Ibrox in the 2011 New Year derby. He scored his second goal for Celtic against Aberdeen in their 4–1 League Cup semi-final win on 29 January 2011. Rogne took part in his first major Cup Final on 20 March 2011 when Celtic played Rangers in the Scottish League Cup Final, but they lost 2–1. An injury in May sidelined Rogne for the rest of the season.

Injury kept Rogne out of the Celtic side for the first few months of the following season. He returned to the Celtic first team in October 2011 in their League Cup quarter-final tie against Hibernian. Rogne continued to struggle with a series of minor injuries, but nevertheless played well in the majority of his sporadic appearances, having kept a clean sheet in over half the games he played. On 25 March 2012, he scored in Celtic's 3–2 defeat to Rangers at Ibrox.

=== Wigan Athletic ===
On 27 June 2013, it was confirmed that Rogne would leave Celtic after his contract expired to join FA Cup holders Wigan Athletic on a free transfer, signing a three-year contract.

On 31 August 2013, Rogne made his Wigan debut at home against Nottingham Forest in a 2–1 win for the side.

=== IFK Göteborg ===
On 14 March 2015, Rogne signed a three-year-long contract with Allsvenskan team IFK Göteborg.

=== Lech Poznań ===
On 1 August 2017, Rogne signed a four-year contract with Ekstraklasa side Lech Poznań, effective from 1 January 2018. He was the captain from January 2020 until July 2021.

On 19 December 2021, following Lech's 2–0 home win against Górnik Zabrze, it was announced his contract would not be extended and he would depart the club on 31 December 2021.

=== Apollon Smyrnis ===
On 4 January 2022, Greek side Apollon Smyrnis F.C., via his official website, informed about the acquisition of Thomas Rogne from Lech Poznań on a free transfer. The central defender, after passing the medical tests, signed a contract with the Greek club valid until 30 June 2023.

=== Helsingborg ===
On 1 July 2022, Rogne signed a contract with Helsingborgs IF in Sweden until the end of 2024. He left the contract at the end of 2024, as his contract expired.

== International career ==
Rogne has represented Norway at youth level, and played for the under-19 team in the 2009 UEFA Under-19 Championship qualification. Rogne was later captain of the under-21 team, and were playing alongside the captain Stefan Strandberg in the central defence when Norway U21 qualified for the 2013 UEFA European Under-21 Championship.

In March 2011, he received his first call-up to the Norway senior side for their Euro 2012 qualification match with Denmark but did not feature.

Rogne made his senior debut for Norway on 29 February 2012 in a 3–0 friendly win against Northern Ireland.

== Personal life ==
In May 2019, Rogne married female professional footballer Ada Hegerberg.

== Career statistics ==
=== Club ===
As of match played 3 August 2024

Appearances and goals by club, season and competition
Club	Season	League			National cup (Note: Includes Norwegian Football Cup, Scottish Cup, Svenska Cupen, Polish Cup)		League cup (Note: Includes Scottish League Cup, Football League Cup)		Europe		Total	
Club	Season	Division	Apps	Goals	Apps	Goals	Apps	Goals	Apps	Goals	Apps	Goals
Stabæk	2007	Tippeligaen	3	0	2	0	—		—		5	0
Stabæk	2008	Tippeligaen	0	0	0	0	—		—		0	0
Stabæk	2009	Tippeligaen	10	1	2	0	—		4 (Note: Two appearances in UEFA Champions League, two appearances in UEFA Europa League)	0	16	1
Stabæk	Total		13	1	4	0	—		4	0	21	1
Celtic	2009–10	Scottish Premier League	4	0	0	0	0	0	—		4	0
Celtic	2010–11	Scottish Premier League	16	1	2	0	2	1	0	0	20	2
Celtic	2011–12	Scottish Premier League	17	1	2	0	3	0	0	0	22	1
Celtic	2012–13	Scottish Premier League	13	0	2	0	1	0	3 (Note: Appearances in UEFA Champions League)	0	19	0
Celtic	Total		50	2	6	0	6	1	3	0	65	3
Wigan Athletic	2013–14	Championship	12	0	0	0	1	0	3 (Note: Appearances in UEFA Europa League)	0	16	0
Wigan Athletic	2014–15	Championship	0	0	0	0	1	0	—		1	0
Wigan Athletic	Total		12	0	0	0	2	0	3	0	17	0
IFK Göteborg	2015	Allsvenskan	19	1	2	0	—		4	0	25	1
IFK Göteborg	2016	Allsvenskan	23	0	1	0	—		7	1	31	1
IFK Göteborg	2017	Allsvenskan	24	0	4	2	—		0	0	28	2
IFK Göteborg	Total		66	1	7	2	—		11	1	84	4
Lech Poznań	2017–18	Ekstraklasa	0	0	—		—		—		0	0
Lech Poznań	2018–19	Ekstraklasa	23	1	1	0	—		5	0	29	1
Lech Poznań	2019–20	Ekstraklasa	20	1	1	0	—		—		21	1
Lech Poznań	2020–21	Ekstraklasa	18	2	1	0	—		4	0	23	2
Lech Poznań	2021–22	Ekstraklasa	1	0	2	0	—		—		3	0
Lech Poznań	Total		62	4	5	0	—		9	0	76	4
Lech Poznań II	2017–18	III liga, gr. II	4	0	—		—		—		4	0
Lech Poznań II	2018–19	III liga, gr. II	1	1	—		—		—		1	1
Lech Poznań II	2019–20	II liga	2	0	—		—		—		2	0
Lech Poznań II	2020–21	II liga	1	0	—		—		—		1	0
Lech Poznań II	2021–22	II liga	4	0	—		—		—		4	0
Lech Poznań II	Total		12	1	—		—		—		12	1
Apollon Smyrnis	2021–22	Super League Greece	15	0	0	0	—		—		15	0
Helsingborgs IF	2022	Allsvenskan	13	0	0	0	—		—		13	0
Helsingborgs IF	2023	Superettan	16	1	1	0	—		—		17	1
Helsingborgs IF	2024	Superettan	8	0	0	0	—		—		8	0
Helsingborgs IF	Total		37	1	1	0	—		—		38	1
Career total			267	10	23	2	8	1	30	1	328	14

=== International ===
As of 15 August 2012

Appearances and goals by national team and year
National team	Year	Apps	Goals
Norway	2012	2	0
Total		2	0

== Honours ==
Stabæk

- Superfinalen: 2009

Celtic

- Scottish Premier League: 2011–12, 2012–13
- Scottish Cup: 2010–11, 2012–13

IFK Göteborg

- Svenska Cupen: 2014–15

Lech Poznań II

- III liga, group II: 2018–19

Lech Poznań

- Ekstraklasa: 2021–22
