= Lawson Sabah =

Ghanaian footballer (born 1997)

Personal information
- Date of birth: 2 April 1997 (age 29)
- Place of birth: Kumasi, Ghana
- Height: 1.77 m (5 ft 10 in)
- Position: Central midfielder

Team information
- Current team: AFC Eskilstuna
- Number: 18

Youth career
- –2013: International Allies

Senior career*
Years	Team	Apps	(Gls)
2013–2015	International Allies	13	(0)
2015–2020	IFK Göteborg	13	(1)
2017	→ Varbergs BoIS (loan)	11	(0)
2018–2020	→ FC Linköping City (loan)	51	(1)
2020	FC Linköping City	17	(1)
2021–2022	AFC Eskilstuna	21	(0)
2021	→ Västerås SK (loan)	12	(0)
2023	Piteå IF	5	(0)
2024–	AFC Eskilstuna	4	(0)

International career
2013–2014	Ghana U17		
- * Club domestic league appearances and goals as of 8 May 2025

Lawson Sabah (born 2 April 1997) is a Ghanaian professional footballer who plays for AFC Eskilstuna as a central midfielder.

== Club career ==
=== Early career ===
Sabah moved to Ghana's capital city Accra to pursue his football career for International Allies as a teenager. He cites the club's chairman Omar El-Eter to be the reason for going professional. He played several games in the Ghanaian Premier League between 2014 and 2015. In January 2015, he signed a 4.5 year contract with IFK Göteborg, but joined the Swedish side the following summer due to being under-age at the time.

=== IFK Göteborg ===
On 28 December 2014, he signed for IFK Göteborg. He made his senior appearance for IFK on 19 August 2015, playing 90 minutes in their 6–1 victory against Kristianstad FF in the domestic cup. His Allsvenskan debut came the following season, coming on as a substitute away against Östersunds FK in May. He came to play 11 games in the 2016 season, scoring his first goal in the last game of the campaign against IFK Norrköping.

On 10 January 2023, Sabah signed a contract with Ettan-Norra side Piteå IF.

== Personal life ==
Lawson was born and grew up in Kumasi to mother Lydia and father Prince. He is a practicing Christian.

His role models are compatriots Michael Essien and Sulley Muntari.

== Career statistics ==
As of 6 November 2016

Appearances and goals by club, season and competition
Club	Season	League		Cup		Continental		Total	
Club	Season	Apps	Goals	Apps	Goals	Apps	Goals	Apps	Goals
International Allies	2015	13	0	0	0	—		13	0
IFK Göteborg	2015	0	0	1	0	0	0	1	0
IFK Göteborg	2016	11	1	1	0	0	0	12	0
IFK Göteborg	Total	11	1	2	0	0	0	13	1
Career total		24	1	2	0	0	0	26	1
