= Thomas Mikkelsen (footballer, born 1990) =

Danish footballer (born 1990)

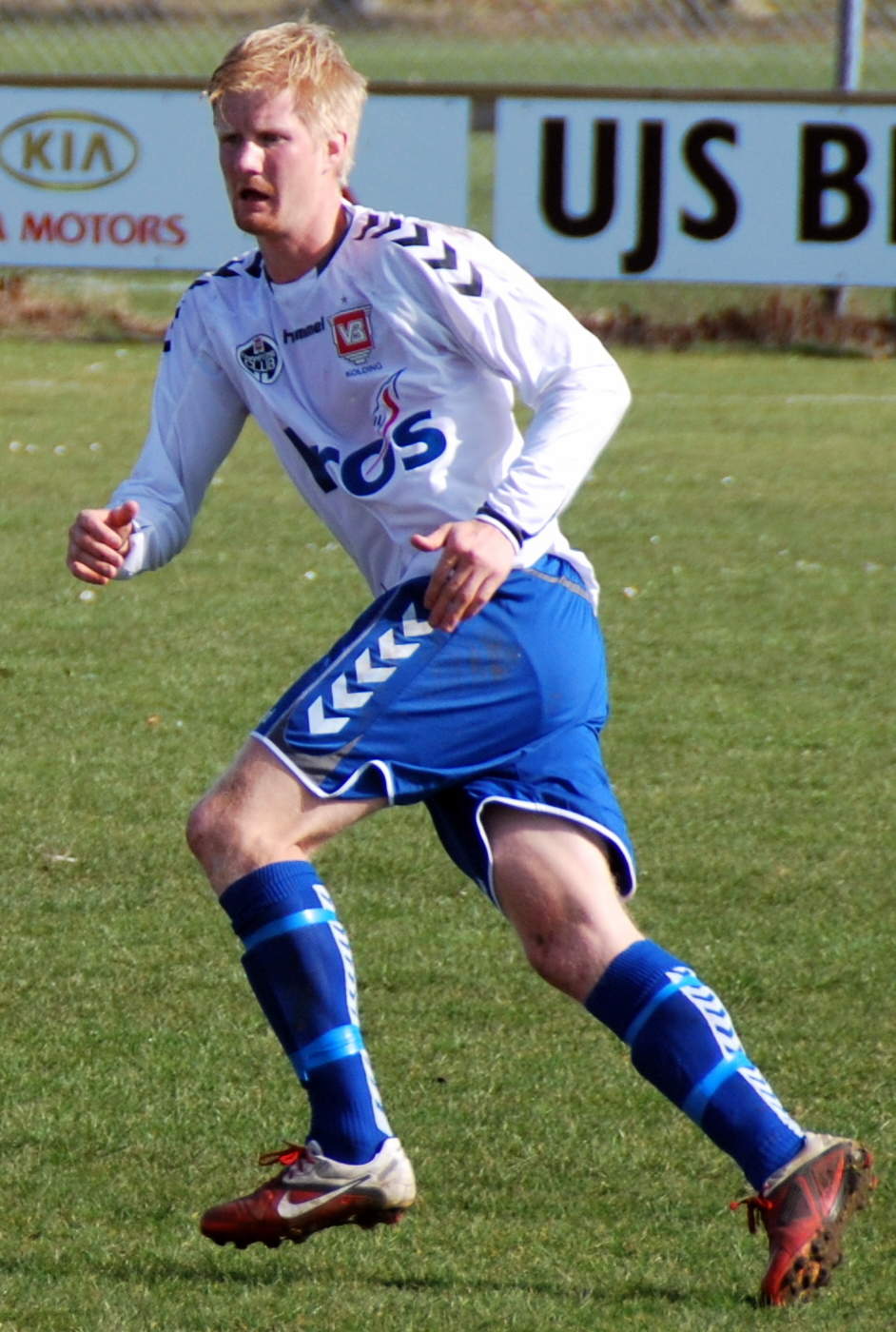
- Mikkelsen in 2012

Personal information
- Date of birth: 19 January 1990 (age 36)
- Place of birth: Tønder, Denmark
- Height: 1.88 m (6 ft 2 in)
- Position: Forward

Youth career
- –2008: Bredebro IF

Senior career*
Years	Team	Apps	(Gls)
2008–2009	Sydvest 05	14	(11)
2009–2011	Vejle	29	(7)
2011–2013	Vejle-Kolding	38	(9)
2013–2014	Fredericia	21	(10)
2014–2017	OB	23	(3)
2015	→ IFK Göteborg (loan)	9	(1)
2015–2016	→ Vejle (loan)	28	(11)
2017	→ Dundee United (loan)	17	(7)
2017–2018	Ross County	9	(2)
2018	→ Dundee United (loan)	13	(3)
2018–2021	Breiðablik	59	(40)
2021–2024	Kolding	76	(29)
2024–2025	Aarhus Fremad	15	(2)
- * Club domestic league appearances and goals

Thomas Mikkelsen (Danish pronunciation: [ˈme̝kl̩sn̩]; born 19 January 1990) is a Danish former professional footballer who played as a forward.

Mikkelsen has previously played for FC Sydvest 05, Vejle BK, Vejle Kolding and FC Fredericia in his native Denmark, for Ross County and Dundee United in Scotland, and IFK Göteborg in Sweden. He spent a season with Aarhus Fremad before retiring in 2025.

== Club career ==
Mikkelsen played youth football for Bredebro IF before joining his first senior club, FC Sydvest 05, where he scored 11 goals in 14 league appearances. He was then signed by Vejle Boldklub, and later played for the merged club Vejle Kolding.

After a year at FC Fredericia, he signed for Danish Superliga team OB in 2014. After joining OB, he was loaned to IFK Göteborg in Sweden, Mikkelsen was an unused substitute for IFK Göteborg in their 2015 Svenska Cupen Final victory. After a successful loan spell at Vejle BK Mikkelsen was loaned back out during 2017 to Scottish Championship team Dundee United in Scotland. He scored the winning goal for Dundee United after coming on as a substitute in the 2017 Scottish Challenge Cup Final, as they won 2–1 against St Mirren.

On 4 July 2017, it was announced that Mikkelsen had signed a two-year deal with Scottish Premiership club Ross County. He made his debut for the club against Alloa in the League Cup. After just two league starts and seven appearances from the bench, Mikkelsen returned on loan to Dundee United in January 2018 for the remainder of the 2017–18 season. Mikkelsen along with five other first-team players were released from Ross County after the club's relegation to the Scottish Championship.

On 14 June 2018 Mikkelsen signed for Icelandic team Breiðablik. Leaving the club in the summer 2021, Mikkelsen returned to Denmark and joined Danish 2nd Division club Kolding IF on a deal until June 2024. On 22 May 2024 Kolding confirmed that Mikkelsen left the club after the current season.

On 1 July 2024, Mikkelsen signed with Aarhus Fremad. In June 2025, Mikkelsen confirmed his retirement from professional football, aged 35.

== Career statistics ==
Appearances and goals by club, season and competition
Club	Season	League			National Cup		League Cup		Other		Total	
Club	Season	Division	Apps	Goals	Apps	Goals	Apps	Goals	Apps	Goals	Apps	Goals
FC Sydvest	2009–10	Jyllandsserien, Group Four	14	11	0	0	—		—		14	11
Vejle BK	2009–10	Danish 1st Division	8	1	0	0	—		—		8	1
Vejle BK	2010–11	Danish 1st Division	21	6	0	0	—		—		21	6
Vejle BK	Total		29	7	0	0	0	0	0	0	29	7
Vejle Kolding	2011–12	Danish 1st Division	21	7	2	0	—		—		23	7
Vejle Kolding	2012–13	Danish 1st Division	17	2	2	0	—		—		19	2
Vejle Kolding	Total		38	9	4	0	0	0	0	0	42	9
FC Fredericia	2013–14	Danish 1st Division	19	9	0	0	—		—		19	9
FC Fredericia	2014–15	Danish 1st Division	2	1	0	0	—		—		2	1
FC Fredericia	Total		21	10	0	0	0	0	0	0	21	10
OB	2014–15	Superligaen	11	1	1	0	—		—		12	1
OB	2015–16	Superligaen	0	0	0	0	—		—		0	0
OB	2016–17	Superligaen	12	2	0	0	—		—		12	2
OB	Total		23	3	1	0	0	0	0	0	24	3
IFK Göteborg (loan)	2015	Allsvenskan	9	1	1	0	—		—		10	1
Vejle BK (loan)	2015–16	Danish 1st Division	28	11	0	0	—		—		28	11
Dundee United (loan)	2016–17	Scottish Championship	17	7	1	0	0	0	8 (Note: Two appearances and a goal in the Scottish Challenge Cup; six appearances in the Premiership play-offs)	1	26	8
Ross County	2017–18	Scottish Premiership	9	2	0	0	5	2	—		14	4
Dundee United (loan)	2017–18	Scottish Championship	13	3	2	0	0	0	4 (Note: Four appearances in the Premiership play-offs)	1	19	4
Breiðablik	2018	Úrvalsdeild karla	11	10	2	1	0	0	0	0	13	11
Breiðablik	2019	Úrvalsdeild karla	20	12	0	0	0	0	2 (Note: Appearance in the UEFA Europa League.)	0	22	12
Breiðablik	Total		31	22	2	1	0	0	2	0	35	23
Career total			236	93	11	1	5	2	14	2	262	93

== Honours ==
=== Club ===
IFK Göteborg

- Svenska Cupen: 2014–15

Dundee United

- Scottish Challenge Cup: 2016–17
