= Karl Bohm (footballer) =

Swedish footballer

Personal information
- Full name: Karl Fredrik Bohm
- Date of birth: 24 August 1995 (age 31)
- Place of birth: Alingsås, Sweden
- Height: 1.78 m (5 ft 10 in)
- Position: Winger

Team information
- Current team: Sandvikens IF
- Number: 8

Youth career
- –2005: Alingsås IF
- 2006–2014: IFK Göteborg

Senior career*
Years	Team	Apps	(Gls)
2013–2015	IFK Göteborg	2	(0)
2015	→ Utsiktens BK (loan)	13	(2)
2016–2017	Utsiktens BK	35	(12)
2018	BK Häcken	5	(1)
2018–2019	GAIS	32	(3)
2020–2025	Utsiktens BK	114	(37)
2025–	Sandvikens IF	38	(4)

International career
2012	Sweden U17	2	(0)
2012–2013	Sweden U19	10	(2)
- * Club domestic league appearances and goals as of 12 November 2026

Karl Bohm (born 24 August 1995) is a Swedish footballer who plays for Sandvikens IF as a winger.

== Career ==
Bohm grew up in Alingsås and started to play for local side Alingsås IF before moving to IFK Göteborg as a 10-year old in 2006.

He had only played for Gothenburg clubs throughout his senior career until Summer 2025, when he moved across the country and signed for Sandvikens IF.

Bohm have played in Allsvenskan for both IFK Göteborg (2013–2014) and BK Häcken (2018), with a total of seven appearances and one scored goal.

== Honours ==
=== Club ===
IFK Göteborg

- Svenska Cupen: 2014–15
