= Alexander Fransson =

Swedish professional footballer (born 1994)

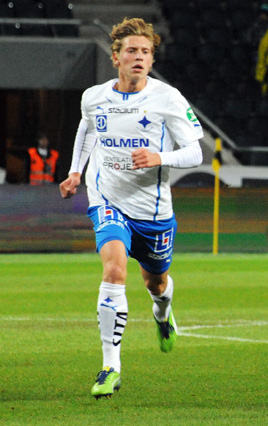
- Fransson with Norrkoping in 2013

Personal information
- Full name: Alexander Martin Fransson
- Date of birth: 2 April 1994 (age 32)
- Place of birth: Norrköping, Sweden
- Height: 1.80 m (5 ft 11 in)
- Position: Midfielder

Team information
- Current team: IFK Norrköping
- Number: 7

Youth career
- –2008: Lindö FF
- 2008–2012: IFK Norrköping

Senior career*
Years	Team	Apps	(Gls)
2013–2015	IFK Norrköping	73	(7)
2016–2018	Basel	51	(2)
2018	→ Lausanne-Sport (loan)	12	(0)
2018–2021	IFK Norrköping	101	(9)
2022–2023	AEK Athens	3	(0)
2023–2024	Omonia	19	(1)
2024	Odds BK	9	(0)
2025–	IFK Norrköping	47	(2)

International career^{‡}
2012–2013	Sweden U19	9	(0)
2014–2017	Sweden U21/O	22	(1)
2016–2019	Sweden	8	(0)
- * Club domestic league appearances and goals as of 11 November 2026 ‡ National team caps and goals as of 01:28, 16 January 2022 (UTC)

Alexander Martin Fransson (born 2 April 1994) is a Swedish professional footballer who plays as a midfielder for Allsvenskan club IFK Norrköping.

== Club career ==
=== IFK Norrköping ===
Born in Norrköping, Fransson joined Norrköping as a 14-year-old from Lindö FF in 2008, and played in the club's academy until 2012. He made his Allsvenskan debut on the opening game of the 2013 season, in their away win against Mjällby AIF, the day before his 19th birthday. He made in total 20 appearances in 2013, 18 in the league and two cup games.

His first Allsvenskan goal came also away at Mjällby, scoring the team's only goal in their 3–1 defeat on 14 August 2014. For Norrköping he played as a midfielder.

In the last round of 2015 Allsvenskan, on 31 October 2015, Fransson won his first senior title as Norrköping won the Swedish championship for the first time in 26 years. Eight days later, Fransson and IFK Norrköping took their second title for the season when they defeated 2014–15 Svenska Cupen winners IFK Göteborg in 2015 Svenska Supercupen.

=== Basel ===
On 2 January 2016, Basel announced that they had signed Fransson on a four-and-a-half-year contract up until 30 June 2020. He joined Basel's first team for their 2015–16 season under head coach Urs Fischer. After playing in three test games, Fransson played his domestic league debut for the club in the away game in the Letzigrund on 14 February 2016 as Basel won 4–0 against Grasshopper, coming in as substitute in the 90 minute. He scored his first league goal for the club on 21 February in the home game in the St. Jakob-Park as Basel won 5–1 against Vaduz.

Under trainer Urs Fischer Fransson won the Swiss Super League championship at the end of the 2015–16 Super League season. Fransson played in 16 of the 18 league matches. At the end of the 2016–17 Super League season the team won the championship again. For the club this was the eighth title in a row and their 20th championship title in total. Fransson played in 25 league games. They also won the Swiss Cup for the twelfth time, which meant they had won the double for the sixth time in the club's history. Frannsson played in four of the sic cup games.

On 26 December 2017 Basel announced that Fransson would be loaned to Lausanne-Sport to gain more first-team opportunities.

After the loan period, Fransson returned to the team, but a few days later it was announced that he would leave the club. In his three seasons with the club, Fransson played a total of 81 games for Basel scoring three goals. 51 of these games were in the Swiss Super League, seven in the Swiss Cup, seven in the UEFA competitions (Champions League and Europa League) and 16 were friendly games. He scored two goala in the domestic league and the other was scored during the cup.

=== Return to IFK Norrköping ===
On 4 July 2018, Norrköping announced that they had signed Fransson on a three-year contract until 30 June 2021.

=== AEK Athens ===
On 2 February 2022, AEK Athens announced that they had signed Fransson on a one-and-a-half-year contract. He didn't have the chance to play regular football for them. He played only in three Super League matches and four in the Greek Cup. He won the double for the 2022–23 season and he was released when his contract expired.

== International career ==
Fransson represented the Sweden U19 national team nine times between 2012 and 2013. In November 2014, Fransson played his first game for Sweden U21.

Fransson made his debut in the Sweden national team in an unofficial friendly against Estonia on 6 January 2016, played in the Armed Forces Stadium in Abu Dhabi. He started the match and played 55 minutes before being substituted in the 1–1 draw. His second cap followed on 10 January in a 3–0 win against Finland played at the same venue. This match was also an unofficial friendly and he came on as a substitute in the 62nd minute.

== Career statistics ==
As of match played 15 May 2023

Appearances and goals by club, season and competition
Club	Season	League			National Cup		Continental		Other		Total	
Club	Season	Division	Apps	Goals	Apps	Goals	Apps	Goals	Apps	Goals	Apps	Goals
IFK Norrköping	2013	Allsvenskan	18	0	2	1	—–		—–		20	1
IFK Norrköping	2014	Allsvenskan	26	2	4	0	—–		—–		30	2
IFK Norrköping	2015	Allsvenskan	29	5	5	0	—–		1 (Note: Appearance in the Svenska Supercupen)	1	35	6
IFK Norrköping	Total		73	7	11	1	0	0	1	1	85	9
Basel	2015–16	Super League	16	1	0	0	3 (Note: Appearances in the Europa League)	0	—		19	1
Basel	2016–17	Super League	25	1	4	1	2 (Note: Appearances in the Champions League)	0	—		31	2
Basel	2017–18	Super League	10	0	3	0	3	0	—		16	0
Basel	Total		51	2	7	1	8	0	—		66	3
Lausanne-Sport (loan)	2017–18	Super League	12	0	0	0	—		—		12	0
IFK Norrköping	2018	Allsvenskan	18	2	1	2	—–		—–		19	4
IFK Norrköping	2019	Allsvenskan	28	5	3	0	6	0	—		37	5
IFK Norrköping	2020	Allsvenskan	25	2	2	0	—–		—–		27	2
IFK Norrköping	2021	Allsvenskan	30	0	4	0	—–		—–		34	0
IFK Norrköping	Total		101	9	10	2	6	0	0	0	117	11
AEK Athens	2021–22	Superleague Greece	1	0	0	0	—		—		1	0
AEK Athens	2022–23	Superleague Greece	2	0	4	0	—		—		6	0
AEK Athens	Total		3	0	4	0	—		—		7	0
Career total			240	18	32	4	14	0	1	1	287	23

=== International ===
As of 11 January 2019.

National team	Year	Apps	Goals
Sweden	2016	5	0
Sweden	2017	0	0
Sweden	2018	1	0
Sweden	2019	2	0
Total		8	0

== Honours ==
IFK Norrköping

- Allsvenskan: 2015
- Svenska Supercupen: 2015

Basel

- Swiss Super League: 2015–16, 2016–17
- Swiss Cup winner: 2016–17

AEK Athens

- Super League Greece: 2022–23
- Greek Cup: 2022–23
