= Victor Sköld =

Swedish footballer

Personal information
- Full name: Kjell Victor Sköld
- Date of birth: 31 July 1989 (age 37)
- Place of birth: Kalmar, Sweden
- Height: 1.81 m (5 ft 11 1/2 in)
- Position: Forward

Team information
- Current team: FC Linköping City
- Number: 11

Youth career
- –2006: Holmalunds IF
- 2006–2008: IF Elfsborg

Senior career*
Years	Team	Apps	(Gls)
2009	IF Elfsborg	0	(0)
2010–2011	FC Trollhättan	54	(16)
2012–2013	Falkenbergs FF	55	(27)
2014–2015	Åtvidabergs FF	45	(8)
2015–2016	IFK Göteborg	8	(0)
2016–2018	Örebro SK	51	(5)
2019–2020	Örgryte IS	7	(3)
2020–2021	FC Linköping City	0	(0)
2021–	Landvetter IS	0	(0)

International career
2006	Sweden U19	4	(0)
- * Club domestic league appearances and goals as of 30 December 2021

Kjell Victor Sköld (born 31 July 1989) is a Swedish footballer who plays for Landvetter IS as a forward.

== Career statistics ==
As of 16 October 2016

Club	Season	League			Cup		Continental		Total	
Club	Season	Division	Apps	Goals	Apps	Goals	Apps	Goals	Apps	Goals
IF Elfsborg	2008	Allsvenskan	0	0	1	0	0	0	1	0
IF Elfsborg	2009	Allsvenskan	0	0	0	0	0	0	0	0
IF Elfsborg	Total		0	0	1	0	0	0	1	0
FC Trollhättan	2010	Superettan	28	9	3	0	—		31	9
FC Trollhättan	2011	Division 1	26	7	3	3	—		29	10
FC Trollhättan	Total		54	16	6	3	0	0	60	19
Falkenbergs FF	2012	Superettan	25	7	1	2	—		26	9
Falkenbergs FF	2013	Superettan	30	20	5	3	—		35	23
Falkenbergs FF	Total		55	27	6	5	0	0	61	32
Åtvidabergs FF	2014	Allsvenskan	30	4	3	0	—		33	4
Åtvidabergs FF	2015	Allsvenskan	15	4	—		—		15	4
Åtvidabergs FF	Total		45	8	3	0	0	0	48	8
IFK Göteborg	2015	Allsvenskan	6	0	1	3	1	0	8	3
IFK Göteborg	2016	Allsvenskan	2	0	2	1	2	1	6	2
IFK Göteborg	Total		8	0	3	4	3	1	14	5
Örebro SK	2016	Allsvenskan	10	2	1	1	—		11	3
Örebro SK	Total		10	2	1	1	0	0	11	3
Career total			172	53	20	13	3	1	195	67

== Honours ==
Falkenbergs FF

- Superettan: 2013

Individual

- Superettan Top Scorer: 2013
