= Billy Nordström =

Swedish footballer

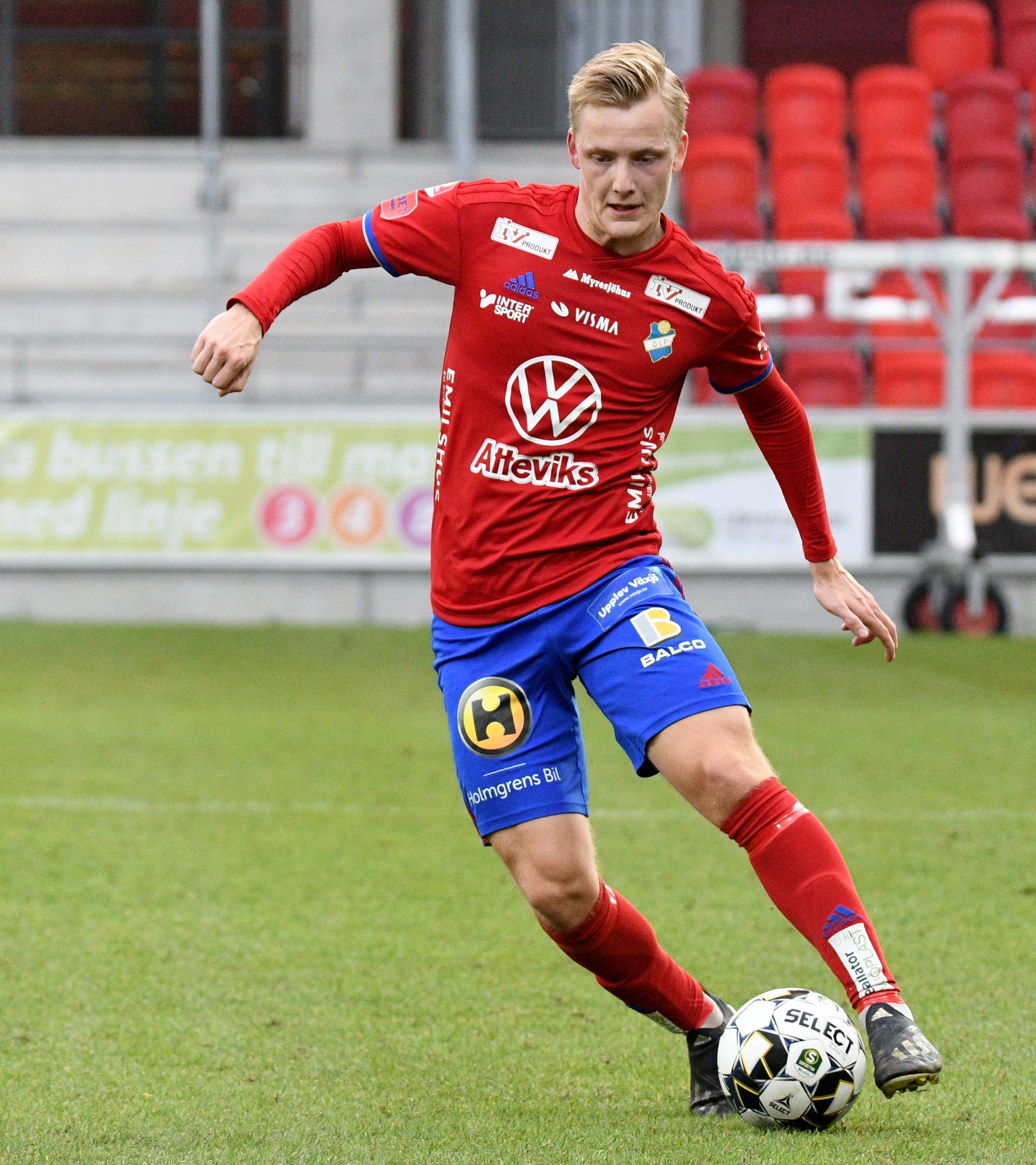

Personal information
- Full name: Billy Brandon Nordström
- Date of birth: 18 September 1995 (age 31)
- Place of birth: Gothenburg, Sweden
- Height: 1.80 m (5 ft 11 in)
- Position: Left back

Youth career
- 2001–2004: Rannebergens IF
- 2005–2014: IFK Göteborg

Senior career*
Years	Team	Apps	(Gls)
2015–2018	IFK Göteborg	36	(0)
2017	→ Varbergs BoIS (loan)	13	(0)
2019	IF Brommapojkarna	26	(0)
2020–2021	Östers IF	32	(0)
2022	Utsikten	0	(0)
2023-	Västra Frölunda IF	0	(0)

International career
2011–2012	Sweden U17	16	(0)
2013	Sweden U19	4	(0)
- * Club domestic league appearances and goals as of 2 April 2022

Billy Nordström (born 18 September 1995) is a Swedish footballer who plays for Västra Frölunda IF as a defender.

== Personal life ==
Billy grew up in Gothenburg suburb Angered with six older siblings. He's been supporting IFK Göteborg his entire life.

On 16 December 2018, Billy joined IF Brommapojkarna. One year later, he signed a one-year contract with Östers IF.

== Career statistics ==
=== Club ===
As of 28 August 2016

Club	Season	League			Cup		Continental		Total	
Club	Season	Division	Apps	Goals	Apps	Goals	Apps	Goals	Apps	Goals
IFK Göteborg	2013	Allsvenskan	0	0	0	0	0	0	0	0
IFK Göteborg	2014	Allsvenskan	0	0	1	0	0	0	1	0
IFK Göteborg	2015	Allsvenskan	1	0	1	0	0	0	2	0
IFK Göteborg	2016	Allsvenskan	4	0	1	0	2	0	7	0
IFK Göteborg	Total		5	0	3	0	2	0	10	0
Career total			5	0	3	0	2	0	10	0
