= Jakob Ankersen =

Danish footballer (born 1990)

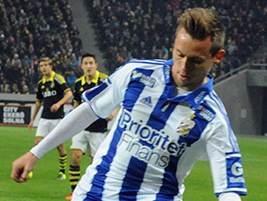
- Jakob Ankersen in 2015

Personal information
- Full name: Jakob Svarrer Ankersen
- Date of birth: 22 September 1990 (age 36)
- Place of birth: Esbjerg, Denmark
- Height: 1.82 m (6 ft 0 in)
- Position: Winger

Youth career
- –2010: Esbjerg fB

Senior career*
Years	Team	Apps	(Gls)
2010–2015	Esbjerg fB	122	(25)
2015–2016	IFK Göteborg	57	(13)
2017	Zulte Waregem	1	(0)
2017–2020	AGF	99	(19)
2020–2021	Esbjerg fB	30	(7)
2021–2023	Randers	56	(5)
2023–2024	Horsens	33	(5)
2025	Esbjerg fB	31	(3)

International career
2012	Denmark U21	1	(0)
- * Club domestic league appearances and goals as of 7 December 2025

Jakob Svarrer Ankersen (born 22 September 1990) is a Danish professional footballer who plays as a winger. He is the twin brother of FC Nordsjælland player Peter Ankersen.

== Career ==
=== Esbjerg fB ===
On 24 June 2009, alongside his twin brother signed a professional contract and was promoted to the first team squad. He got his breakthrough in the 2010–11 season and was rewarded with a new contract until 2014. He extended his contract once again in July 2012 this time until 2016. He quickly became a regular part of the squad and played 32 league games in the 2012–13 season.

Alongside twin brother Peter, he played a part of the Esbjerg fB team that following promotion won the Danish Cup and finished 4th in the Danish Superliga, forming a fast and aggressive right side for Esbjerg.

After three successful season, Ankersen became a very wanted player, and his agent revealed in December 2013, that there had bin interest from the Netherlands and Belgium. According to BT, Ankersen rejected a bid from Norwegian club Rosenborg BK in August 2014. In January 2015 Ankersen announced, that he was looking for a new club to play for. Later the same day Esbjerg confirmed, that they hoped he remained at the club.

=== IFK Göteborg ===
On 2 February 2015, Ankersen signed a three-year contract with Allsvenskan club IFK Göteborg. He played his first match for the club on 5 April 2015 against Åtvidabergs FF. In his first season there, they won the Svenska Cupen, and came second in both the Allsvenskan and the Svenska Supercupen, and played 35 matches.

In the January transfer market 2016–17, IFK Göteborg revealed, that they were ready to sell Ankersen, if they received a good bid. There was interest from Belgium.

=== Zulte Waregem ===
Ankersen signed for Zulte Waregem on 30 January 2017.

Ankersen's first season at the club was a nightmare for him. He only played 35 minutes in the first half season and was left out of the squad in nine matches. He described the situation as "a disaster and chaotic". In May 2017 Ankersen revealed, that he was furious at the club because they hadn't complied with their promises. He also said, that he would more than like to leave the club.

=== Second spell at Esbjerg fB ===
On 6 August 2020, Ankersen returned to newly relegated Danish 1st Division club Esbjerg fB on a three-year deal.

On 9 July 2021, Esbjerg confirmed that Ankersen, alongside three teammates, had been removed from the first team and sent down to train with the U19s. It came in the wake of a riot between players from the squad and the club's new coach, Peter Hyballa. According to Danish media, the squad was very dissatisfied with the coach's methods, describing it as Hyballa was "...photographing players in underpants, punching the players, shaming them in front of their teammates, verbal torture and a training program so hard that the injuries were rolling in". As a result of the whole situation, Ankersen decided to resign from his contract on 10 August 2021.

=== Randers ===
Immediately after his departure from Esbjerg was announced, on 10 August 2021, Ankersen was presented as a new Randers FC player, signing a deal until June 2022. Ankersen left Randers at the end of the 2022–23 season, as his contract expired.

=== AC Horsens ===
On 10 July 2023, Ankersen joined newly relegated Danish 1st Division side AC Horsens on a deal until June 2025.

On 2 September 2024, AC Horsens announced the termination of Ankersen's contract following his desire to seek new challenges. After not securing a new opportunity, Ankersen announced his retirement from professional football on 13 November 2024.

=== Third spell at Esbjerg fB ===
On 3 February 2025, Ankersen came out of retirement to sign for his former club Esbjerg fB on a short-term contract.

On 9 January 2026, Esbjerg confirmed that the club and Ankersen had agreed to terminate their cooperation six months early, with immediate effect.

== Career statistics ==
As of match played 3 December 2025

Appearances and goals by club, season and competition
Club	Season	League			National cup		Europe		Other		Total	
Club	Season	Division	Apps	Goals	Apps	Goals	Apps	Goals	Apps	Goals	Apps	Goals
Esbjerg fB	2010–11	Danish Superliga	17	4	2	0	—		—		19	4
Esbjerg fB	2011–12	Danish 1st Division	25	0	1	0	—		—		26	0
Esbjerg fB	2012–13	Danish Superliga	32	7	6	0	—		—		38	7
Esbjerg fB	2013–14	Danish Superliga	31	9	1	0	10 (Note: Appearances in UEFA Europa League)	0	—		42	9
Esbjerg fB	2014–15	Danish Superliga	17	5	2	3	4	1	—		23	9
Esbjerg fB	Total		122	25	12	3	14	1	—		148	29
IFK Göteborg	2015	Allsvenskan	28	6	6	3	4	0	1 (Note: Appearance in Svenska Supercupen)	0	39	9
IFK Göteborg	2016	Allsvenskan	29	7	3	0	6	1	—		11	0
IFK Göteborg	Total		57	13	9	3	10	1	1	0	77	17
Zulte Waregem	2016–17	Belgian First Division A	1	0	0	0	—		—		1	0
AGF	2017–18	Danish Superliga	29	5	1	0	—		—		30	5
AGF	2018–19	Danish Superliga	34	8	2	0	—		—		36	8
AGF	2019–20	Danish Superliga	36	6	5	2	—		—		41	8
AGF	Total		99	19	8	2	—		—		107	21
Esbjerg fB	2020–21	Danish 1st Division	30	7	3	2	—		—		33	9
Randers	2021–22	Danish Superliga	27	2	4	1	10 (Note: Two appearances in UEFA Europa League, eight appearances in UEFA Europa Conference League)	0	—		30	5
Randers	2022–23	Danish Superliga	29	3	1	0	—		—		30	3
Randers	Total		56	5	5	1	10	0	—		71	6
Horsens	2023–24	Danish 1st Division	27	5	0	0	—		—		27	5
Horsens	2024–25	Danish 1st Division	6	0	0	0	—		—		6	0
Horsens	Total		33	5	0	0	—		—		33	5
Esbjerg fB	2024–25	Danish 1st Division	14	0	—		—		—		14	0
Esbjerg fB	2025–26	Danish 1st Division	17	3	5	3	—		—		22	6
Esbjerg fB	Total		31	3	5	3	—		—		36	6
Career total			429	77	42	14	34	2	1	0	506	93

== Honours ==
Esbjerg fB

- Danish 1st Division: 2011–12
- Danish Cup: 2012–13

IFK Göteborg

- Svenska Cupen: 2014–15
