= Mikael Boman =

Swedish footballer

Personal information
- Full name: Ernst Anders Mikael Boman
- Date of birth: 14 July 1988 (age 38)
- Place of birth: Kungsbacka, Sweden
- Height: 1.88 m (6 ft 2 in)
- Position: Forward

Youth career
- –2002: Kungsbacka BI

Senior career*
Years	Team	Apps	(Gls)
2002–2004	Kungsbacka BI		
2005–2007	IFK Fjärås		
2008–2011	Falkenbergs FF	106	(22)
2012–2014	Halmstads BK	88	(32)
2015–2017	IFK Göteborg	71	(18)
2018–2019	Randers FC	25	(1)
2019–2022	Halmstads BK	95	(26)
2024	Kungsbacka City	9	(2)
- * Club domestic league appearances and goals as of 14 October 2024

Ernst Anders Mikael Boman (born 14 July 1988) is a Swedish footballer who played as a forward for Falkenbergs FF, Halmstads BK, IFK Göteborg and Randers FC.

== Career ==
=== Early career ===
Mikael Boman was born and raised in the small town of Kungsbacka in northern Halland and started in an early age in the local club Kungsbacka IB in Division 6. At the age of 14 he was given the chance in the senior team, this was followed by offers from IFK Göteborg and Örgryte IS to play in their youth teams, which he rejected, he also rejected to represent Halland on the Elitpojklägret (Elite youth camp), a youth camp from which youngest of Sweden U17's teams is selected from. Boman then signed for IFK Fjärås in Division 3, his first season with the club went poorly as the club was relegated, however the following season Boman helped the club return by scoring 10 goals and the success continued as Boman became top goalscorer in the Division and Fjärås came in second place, which resulted in a promotion playoff against Sävedalens IF, a 3–8 defeat on aggregate.

=== Falkenbergs FF ===
However his playing had not gone unnoticed as Falkenbergs FF signed him, while in Falkenberg he primarily became second striker behind Joel Johansson, Stefan Rodevåg and Daniel Alexandersson in succession, despite this Boman did a fair number of matches and scored a number of goals for Falkenberg. During his time in Falkenberg he was given a limited amount of attention until 2010 as he scored 4 goals in a match against Assyriska FF, prior to the match he had contacted his old teammate Jens Gustafsson, manager in Halmstads BK, and stated an interest to play for Halmstads BK and Jens sent up a scout to have a look at him during the Assyriska match.

=== Halmstads BK ===
On 13 October 2011 Halmstads BK announced that they had signed Mikael Boman as bosman, which resulted in Falkenbergs FF becoming upset as they considered it a bad behavior announcing the transfer before the season was fully over.

Halmstads BK was relegated prior to the end of the 2011 Allsvenskan season, in Superettan Mikael Boman teamed up with Icelandic forward Guðjón Baldvinsson to form Halmstad's forward pair, the pair became one of the main reason for Halmstad's return to Allsvenskan as they scored 29 out of Halmstad's 61 goals, Boman scoring 13 of them, finishing in 6th position in the overall goalscorer league.

=== IFK Göteborg ===
On 23 October 2014 he signed a three-year-long contract with his old favorite team IFK Göteborg.

=== Randers FC ===
Boman signed for Danish Superliga club Randers FC on 31 January 2018. He left the club at the end of the 2018/19 season and returned to Halmstad BK.

== Personal life ==
Prior to completely focusing on football, he also played table tennis for Tölö BTK.

== Career statistics ==
As of 31 October 2015

Club	Season	League		Cup		Continental		Total	
Club	Season	Apps	Goals	Apps	Goals	Apps	Goals	Apps	Goals
Falkenbergs FF	2008	28	7	2	2	—		30	9
Falkenbergs FF	2009	24	4	1	0	—		25	4
Falkenbergs FF	2010	28	3	1	0	—		29	3
Falkenbergs FF	2011	26	8	4	0	—		30	8
Falkenbergs FF	Total	106	22	8	2	0	0	114	24
Halmstads BK	2012	30	13	1	2	—		31	15
Halmstads BK	2013	29	9	3	0	—		32	9
Halmstads BK	2014	29	10	2	0	—		31	10
Halmstads BK	Total	88	32	6	2	0	0	94	34
IFK Göteborg	2015	27	6	7	3	4	1	38	10
IFK Göteborg	Total	27	6	7	3	4	1	38	10
Career total		221	60	21	7	4	1	246	68

== Honours ==
IFK Göteborg

- Svenska Cupen: 2014–15

Individual

- Division 3 Sydvästra Götaland top scorer: 2007
