= John Alvbåge =

Swedish footballer (born 1982)

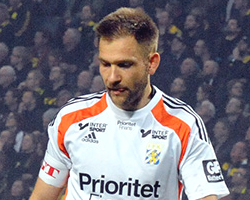

Personal information
- Full name: John Rune Alvbåge
- Date of birth: 10 August 1982 (age 44)
- Place of birth: Gothenburg, Sweden
- Height: 1.87 m (6 ft 2 in)
- Position: Goalkeeper

Youth career
- Torslanda IK

Senior career*
| Years | Team | Apps | (Gls) |
| 1999 | Torslanda IK | 1 | (0) |
| 2000–2002 | Västra Frölunda IF | 72 | (0) |
| 2003–2004 | Örebro SK | 51 | (0) |
| 2005 | IFK Göteborg | 0 | (0) |
| 2005–2008 | Viborg FF | 87 | (0) |
| 2008–2011 | Örebro SK | 107 | (0) |
| 2012–2017 | IFK Göteborg | 131 | (0) |
| 2017 | → Minnesota United (loan) | 3 | (0) |
| 2017 | → Stabæk (loan) | 8 | (0) |
| 2018–2019 | Omonia | 1 | (0) |
| 2018–2019 | → Nea Salamina (loan) | 1 | (0) |
| 2019 | IK Sirius | 7 | (0) |
| 2020 | Lindome GIF | 26 | (0) |
| 2021 | Akropolis IF | 13 | (0) |
| Total | | 508 | (0) |

International career
| 1997–1999 | Sweden U16 | 14 | (0) |
| 2000 | Sweden U18 | 4 | (0) |
| 2002–2004 | Sweden U21 | 11 | (0) |
| 2006–2009 | Sweden | 4 | (0) |
- * Club domestic league appearances and goals as of 16:02, 21 January 2022 (UTC)

John Rune Alvbåge (Swedish pronunciation: [ˈjɔnː ˈâlːvˌboːɡɛ]; born 10 August 1982) is a Swedish former professional footballer who played as a goalkeeper. Beginning his career with Torslanda IK in 1999, he went on to play professionally in Sweden, Denmark, Norway, the United States, and Cyprus before announcing his retirement in 2022. A full international between 2006 and 2009, he won four caps for the Sweden national team and was a squad member at the 2006 FIFA World Cup.

== Club career ==
=== Early career ===
After playing for local club Torslanda IK, he joined Västra Frölunda IF and debuted in the Swedish Allsvenskan, only 18 years old. He then moved to Örebro SK in 2003, before joining IFK Göteborg in 2005. He only stayed half a season at IFK Göteborg, where he was a backup for former Swedish international goalkeeper Bengt Andersson.

=== Viborg FF ===
He moved abroad later that same year, being bought by Danish club Viborg FF in July 2005. Bought as a replacement for Danish international goalkeeper Jesper Christiansen, Alvbåge quickly established himself in the Viborg team, and debuted for the Sweden national team in January 2006.

=== Return to Örebro SK ===
He returned to Örebro SK during the summer of 2008.

=== Return to IFK Göteborg ===
Before the start of the 2012 season, he returned to IFK Göteborg where he was the first-choice goalkeeper. He helped the club win two Svenska Cupen titles (2012–13 and 2014–15) during his time there.

==== Loan to Minnesota United ====
In January 2017 it was announced that Alvbåge had been loaned to Minnesota United FC of Major League Soccer until July 2017 with the option for an additional 18 months.

=== Retirement ===
Alvbåge announced his retirement from professional football on 27 July 2022.

== International career ==
Alvbåge represented Sweden at all youth levels, including U17, U19, and U21 level. He represented the Sweden U21 team at the 2004 UEFA European Under-21 Championship where Sweden finished fourth.

He made his full international debut for Sweden in a friendly game against Jordan on 23 January 2006. Later that year, he was selected for the 2006 FIFA World Cup squad as the third-choice goalkeeper behind Andreas Isaksson and Rami Shaaban. In total, he made four appearances for Sweden between 2006 and 2009.

== Career statistics ==
=== Club ===
Appearances and goals by club, season and competition
| Club | Season | League | | | Cup | | Continental | | Total | |
| Club | Season | Division | Apps | Goals | Apps | Goals | Apps | Goals | Apps | Goals |
|---|---|---|---|---|---|---|---|---|---|---|
| Torslanda IK | 1999 | Division 2 Västra Götaland | 1 | 0 | 0 | 0 | — | | 1 | 0 |
| Västra Frölunda IF | 2000 | Allsvenskan | 12 | 0 | 0 | 0 | 2 | 0 | 14 | 0 |
| Västra Frölunda IF | 2001 | Superettan | 30 | 0 | 0 | 0 | — | | 30 | 0 |
| Västra Frölunda IF | 2002 | Superettan | 30 | 0 | 0 | 0 | — | | 30 | 0 |
| Västra Frölunda IF | Total | | 72 | 0 | 0 | 0 | 2 | 0 | 74 | 0 |
| Örebro SK | 2003 | Allsvenskan | 26 | 0 | 2 | 0 | — | | 28 | 0 |
| Örebro SK | 2004 | Allsvenskan | 25 | 0 | 2 | 0 | — | | 27 | 0 |
| Örebro SK | Total | | 51 | 0 | 4 | 0 | 0 | 0 | 55 | 0 |
| IFK Göteborg | 2005 | Allsvenskan | 0 | 0 | 2 | 0 | 3 | 0 | 5 | 0 |
| Viborg FF | 2005–06 | Danish Superliga | 33 | 0 | 0 | 0 | — | | 33 | 0 |
| Viborg FF | 2006–07 | Danish Superliga | 33 | 0 | 0 | 0 | — | | 33 | 0 |
| Viborg FF | 2007–08 | Danish Superliga | 21 | 0 | 0 | 0 | — | | 21 | 0 |
| Viborg FF | Total | | 87 | 0 | 0 | 0 | 0 | 0 | 87 | 0 |
| Örebro SK | 2008 | Allsvenskan | 18 | 0 | 0 | 0 | — | | 18 | 0 |
| Örebro SK | 2009 | Allsvenskan | 30 | 0 | 0 | 0 | — | | 30 | 0 |
| Örebro SK | 2010 | Allsvenskan | 30 | 0 | 2 | 0 | — | | 32 | 0 |
| Örebro SK | 2011 | Allsvenskan | 29 | 0 | 3 | 0 | 2 | 0 | 34 | 0 |
| Örebro SK | Total | | 107 | 0 | 5 | 0 | 2 | 0 | 114 | 0 |
| IFK Göteborg | 2012 | Allsvenskan | 23 | 0 | 1 | 0 | — | | 24 | 0 |
| IFK Göteborg | 2013 | Allsvenskan | 30 | 0 | 7 | 0 | 2 | 0 | 39 | 0 |
| IFK Göteborg | 2014 | Allsvenskan | 19 | 0 | 4 | 0 | 2 | 0 | 25 | 0 |
| IFK Göteborg | 2015 | Allsvenskan | 30 | 0 | 4 | 0 | 4 | 0 | 38 | 0 |
| IFK Göteborg | 2016 | Allsvenskan | 29 | 0 | 4 | 0 | 7 | 0 | 40 | 0 |
| IFK Göteborg | Total | | 131 | 0 | 20 | 0 | 15 | 0 | 166 | 0 |
| Minnesota United (loan) | 2017 | Major League Soccer | 3 | 0 | 0 | 0 | — | | 3 | 0 |
| Stabaek (loan) | 2017 | Eliteserien | 8 | 0 | | | — | | 7 | 0 |
| Omonia | 2017–18 | Cypriot First Division | 1 | 0 | 0 | 0 | — | | 1 | 0 |
| Omonia | 2018–19 | Cypriot First Division | 0 | 0 | | | — | | 0 | 0 |
| Omonia | Total | | 1 | 0 | 0 | 0 | 0 | 0 | 1 | 0 |
| Nea Salamina (loan) | 2017–18 | Cypriot First Division | 1 | 0 | | | — | | 1 | 0 |
| IK Sirius | 2019 | Allsvenskan | 7 | 0 | 0 | 0 | — | | 7 | 0 |
| Lindome GIF | 2020 | Ettan Södra | 26 | 0 | 0 | 0 | — | | 26 | 0 |
| Akropolis IF | 2021 | Superettan | 13 | 0 | 0 | 0 | — | | 13 | 0 |
| Career total | | | 511 | 0 | 31 | 0 | 22 | 0 | 564 | 0 |

=== International ===
Appearances and goals by national team and year
| National team | Year | Apps | Goals |
|---|---|---|---|
| Sweden | 2006 | 2 | 0 |
| Sweden | 2007 | 1 | 0 |
| Sweden | 2008 | 0 | 0 |
| Sweden | 2009 | 1 | 0 |
| Total | | 4 | 0 |

== Honours ==
IFK Göteborg

- Svenska Cupen: 2012–13, 2014–15

Individual

- Allsvenskan goalkeeper of the year: 2015
- Archangel of the Year: 2015
