= Ayanda Nkili =

South African soccer player

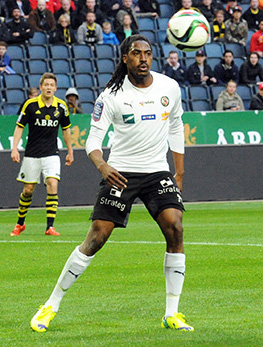

Personal information
- Date of birth: 11 September 1990 (age 36)
- Place of birth: South Africa
- Height: 1.84 m (6 ft 0 in)
- Position: Defender

Youth career
- Stars of Africa

Senior career*
Years	Team	Apps	(Gls)
2010–2013	IFK Hässleholm	26	(7)
2013–2015	Örebro SK	62	(0)
2017–2018	Stellenbosch	13	(1)
2018–2020	Polokwane City	34	(3)
2020–2021	TTM	14	(0)
2021–2023	Marumo Gallants	28	(0)
- * Club domestic league appearances and goals as of 18 November 2024

Ayanda Nkili (born 11 September 1990) is a South African soccer player who played as a defender.

== Club career ==
=== Early career ===
Nkili started his career at the Stars of Africa football academy in Johannesburg, South Africa. In 2010, he signed his first professional contract with Division 2 side IFK Hässleholm. He became the fourth Stars of Africa graduate to play in Sweden, following in the footsteps of May Mahlangu, Tokelo Rantie and Bradley Ralani.

=== Örebro ===
Following a successful spell with the club, he signed for Superettan club Örebro SK in February 2013. He made his debut for ÖSK on 9 March 2013, playing the full ninety minutes in a 1−0 loss to Falkenbergs FF in the group stage of the Svenska Cupen. In his first season with ÖSK, Nkili featured in 29 league matches, starting all but three, as the club finished as runners-up and were promoted back to the Allsvenskan after a one-year absence.

== Career statistics ==
As of 7 September 2014.

Club	Season	League			Cup		Europe		Total	
Club	Season	Division	Apps	Goals	Apps	Goals	Apps	Goals	Apps	Goals
Örebro	2013	Superettan	29	0	3	0	0	0	32	0
Örebro	2014	Allsvenskan	16	0	1	0	0	0	17	0
Örebro	Total		45	0	4	0	0	0	49	0
Career totals			45	0	4	0	0	0	49	0

== Honours ==
Örebro SK

- Superettan Runner-up: 2013
- The Atlantic Cup Runner-up: 2014
