= 2020 IFK Göteborg season =

IFK Göteborg
2020 season
- Chairman: Mats Engström
- Head coach: Poya Asbaghi (until 3 September); Ferran Sibila (caretaker, 3–11 September); Roland Nilsson (from 11 September)
- Stadium: Gamla Ullevi
- Allsvenskan: 12th
- 2019–20 Svenska Cupen: Winners
- 2020–21 UEFA Europa League: Second qualifying round
- Top goalscorer: League: Patrik Karlsson Lagemyr; Tobias Sana (5); All: Patrik Karlsson Lagemyr; Tobias Sana (6)
- Highest home attendance: 2,625 vs. IK Sirius (7 March 2020; Svenska Cupen)
- Lowest home attendance: 0 (17 matches) (Note: Due to the COVID-19 pandemic, the entire league season from June to December was played behind closed doors.)
- Average home league attendance: 0
- Biggest win: 4–0 vs. Östersunds FK (29 November 2020, Allsvenskan)
- Biggest defeat: 0–4 vs. Hammarby IF (10 September 2020, Allsvenskan)
Home colours	Away colours	Third colours

The 2020 season was IFK Göteborg's 115th in existence, their 88th season in Allsvenskan and their 44th consecutive season in the league. They competed in Allsvenskan, Svenska Cupen and UEFA Europa League. League play started on 14 June and ended on 6 December.

== Players ==
=== Squad ===
Note: Flags indicate national team as defined under FIFA eligibility rules; some limited exceptions apply. Players may hold more than one non-FIFA nationality.

No.	Pos.	Nation	Player
1	GK	GRE	Giannis Anestis
2	DF	SWE	Jesper Tolinsson
4	DF	SWE	Kristopher Da Graca
5	DF	SWE	Alexander Jallow
6	DF	SWE	Rasmus Wikström
7	MF	SWE	Sebastian Eriksson
8	MF	SWE	Hosam Aiesh
9	FW	SWE	Robin Söder (captain)
10	FW	SWE	Patrik Karlsson Lagemyr
11	MF	SWE	Amin Affane
14	FW	SWE	Christian Kouakou
15	MF	SWE	Jakob Johansson
16	FW	SWE	Sargon Abraham

No.	Pos.	Nation	Player
17	FW	SWE	Alexander Farnerud
18	MF	SWE	Isak Dahlqvist
19	MF	SWE	August Erlingmark (3rd captain)
21	MF	SWE	Noah Alexandersson
22	FW	GEO	Giorgi Kharaishvili
23	DF	SWE	Emil Holm
26	DF	ARM	André Calisir (vice-captain)
27	DF	SWE	Yahya Kalley
28	MF	NGR	Alhassan Yusuf
30	DF	SWE	Mattias Bjärsmyr
31	GK	SWE	Tom Amos
86	MF	SWE	Pontus Wernbloom
89	MF	SWE	Tobias Sana

== Club ==
=== Other information ===
Chairman	(Sweden) Mats Engström
Club director	(Sweden) Max Markusson
Director of sports	(Sweden) Pontus Farnerud
Ground (capacity and dimensions)	Gamla Ullevi (18,600 / 105x68 m)

Source: IFK Göteborg and Gamla Ullevi

== Competitions ==
=== Overall ===
Competition	Started round	Final position / round	First match	Last match
Allsvenskan	Matchday 1	12th	14 June 2020	6 December 2020
2019–20 Svenska Cupen	Round 2	Winners	22 August 2019	30 July 2020
2020–21 UEFA Europa League	Second qualifying round	Second qualifying round	17 September 2020	

Updated to match played 6 December 2020
Source: Competitions

=== Allsvenskan ===
==== League table ====
Pos	Team	Pld	W	D	L	GF	GA	GD	Pts	Qualification or relegation
10	IK Sirius	30	9	11	10	43	51	−8	38	
11	Varbergs BoIS	30	10	7	13	45	44	+1	37	
12	IFK Göteborg	30	7	13	10	35	41	−6	34	
13	Östersunds FK	30	8	9	13	27	46	−19	33	
14	Kalmar FF (O)	30	6	10	14	30	49	−19	28	Qualification for the relegation play-offs

Source: svenskfotboll.se (in Swedish)
Rules for classification: 1) Points; 2) Goal difference; 3) Goals scored; 4) Head-to-head points; 5) Head-to-head goal difference; 6) Head-to-head away goals scored; 7) Play-off
(Note: Play-off is only played if need to decide champion, teams for relegation or UEFA competition and will be played on a neutral ground).
(O) Play-off winners

==== Results summary ====
Overall								Home						Away					
Pld	W	D	L	GF	GA	GD	Pts	W	D	L	GF	GA	GD	W	D	L	GF	GA	GD
30	7	13	10	35	41	−6	34	3	5	7	15	24	−9	4	8	3	20	17	+3

Last updated: 6 December 2020.
Source: svenskfotboll.se (in Swedish)

==== Results by round ====
Round	1	2	3	4	5	6	7	8	9	10	11	12	13	14	15	16	17	18	19	20	21	22	23	24	25	26	27	28	29	30
Ground	H	A	H	A	H	A	H	H	A	H	A	H	H	A	A	H	A	A	H	A	H	A	H	A	A	H	A	H	A	H
Result	L	W	D	D	W	L	L	D	D	D	D	L	D	D	D	L	D	D	L	W	L	D	W	L	L	L	W	D	W	W
Position	11	9	8	9	4	9	10	11	12	12	11	12	11	11	11	12	13	12	13	12	14	13	13	13	13	13	13	13	13	12

Source: see below
A = Away; H = Home; W = Win; D = Draw; L = Loss

==== Matches ====
Kickoff times are in UTC+2 unless stated otherwise.

14 June 2020 Round 1	IFK Göteborg	0–1	IF Elfsborg	Gothenburg
14:30		Report	Frick 45'	Stadium: Gamla Ullevi; Attendance: 0 Referee: Glenn Nyberg

18 June 2020 Round 2	Varbergs BoIS	1–2	IFK Göteborg	Varberg
19:00	Da Graca 15' (o.g.)	Report	Sana 45+1'; Karlsson Lagemyr 86'	Stadium: Påskbergsvallen; Attendance: 0 Referee: Bojan Pandžić

22 June 2020 Round 3	IFK Göteborg	2–2	Mjällby AIF	Gothenburg
19:00	Bjärsmyr 49'; Abraham 90+2'	Report	Bergström 5'; Löfquist 59'	Stadium: Gamla Ullevi; Attendance: 0 Referee: Mohammed Al-Hakim

28 June 2020 Round 4	IK Sirius	2–2	IFK Göteborg	Uppsala
14:30	Andersson 35'; Vecchia 63'	Report	Karlsson Lagemyr 37'; Farnerud 80'	Stadium: Studenternas IP; Attendance: 0 Referee: Glenn Nyberg

2 July 2020 Round 5	IFK Göteborg	1–0	AIK	Gothenburg
19:00	Mets 90+2' (o.g.)	Report		Stadium: Gamla Ullevi; Attendance: 0 Referee: Kristoffer Karlsson

6 July 2020 Round 6	IFK Norrköping	3–1	IFK Göteborg	Norrköping
19:00	Jóhannesson 26'; Krogh Gerson 75'; Almqvist 90+4'	Report	Karlsson Lagemyr 72'	Stadium: Nya Parken; Attendance: 0 Referee: Glenn Nyberg

12 July 2020 Round 7	IFK Göteborg	1–2	Djurgårdens IF	Gothenburg
17:30	Aiesh 62' (pen.)	Report	Ulvestad 9' (pen.); Holmberg 34'	Stadium: Gamla Ullevi; Attendance: 0 Referee: Kaspar Sjöberg

15 July 2020 Round 8	IFK Göteborg	1–1	Helsingborgs IF	Gothenburg
19:00	Kharaishvili 11'	Report	Al Hamlawi 90+1'	Stadium: Gamla Ullevi; Attendance: 0 Referee: Andreas Ekberg

20 July 2020 Round 9	Hammarby IF	1–1	IFK Göteborg	Stockholm
19:00	I. Khalili 69'	Report	Aiesh 90+4' (pen.)	Stadium: Tele2 Arena; Attendance: 0 Referee: Kristoffer Karlsson

23 July 2020 Round 10	IFK Göteborg	2–2	Falkenbergs FF	Gothenburg
19:00	Kharaishvili 9'; Aiesh 54'	Report	Sylisufaj 73'; C. Johansson 90+4'	Stadium: Gamla Ullevi; Attendance: 0 Referee: Bojan Pandžić

26 July 2020 Round 11	BK Häcken	0–0	IFK Göteborg	Gothenburg
14:30		Report		Stadium: Bravida Arena; Attendance: 0 Referee: Andreas Ekberg

2 August 2020 Round 12	IFK Göteborg	0–3	Malmö FF	Gothenburg
17:30		Report	Christiansen 5' (pen.); Sarr 18'; Berget 83'	Stadium: Gamla Ullevi; Attendance: 0 Referee: Mohammed Al-Hakim

6 August 2020 Round 13	IFK Göteborg	2–2	Östersunds FK	Gothenburg
19:00	Erlingmark 3', 85'	Report	Johansson 27' (o.g.); Sonko Sundberg 31'	Stadium: Gamla Ullevi; Attendance: 0 Referee: Victor Wolf

9 August 2020 Round 14	Örebro SK	1–1	IFK Göteborg	Örebro
14:30	Mehmeti 58'	Report	Sana 84' (pen.)	Stadium: Eyravallen; Attendance: 0 Referee: Adam Ladebäck

13 August 2020 Round 15	Kalmar FF	1–1	IFK Göteborg	Kalmar
19:00	Israelsson 14'	Report	Sana 32'	Stadium: Guldfågeln Arena; Attendance: 0 Referee: Glenn Nyberg

17 August 2020 Round 16	IFK Göteborg	1–3	IFK Norrköping	Gothenburg
19:00	Karlsson Lagemyr 61'	Report	Almqvist 4'; Nyman 30'; Levi 76'	Stadium: Gamla Ullevi; Attendance: 0 Referee: Victor Wolf

22 August 2020 Round 17	Djurgårdens IF	2–2	IFK Göteborg	Stockholm
15:00	Berg 51'; Edwards 59'	Report	Sana 42' (pen.); Farnerud 87'	Stadium: Tele2 Arena; Attendance: 0 Referee: Kristoffer Karlsson

30 August 2020 Round 18	Mjällby AIF	1–1	IFK Göteborg	Hällevik
14:30	Löfquist 57' (pen.)	Report	Karlsson Lagemyr 25'	Stadium: Strandvallen; Attendance: 0 Referee: Mohammed Al-Hakim

10 September 2020 Round 19	IFK Göteborg	0–4	Hammarby IF	Gothenburg
19:00		Report	Jóhannsson 20'; Tanković 71', 78', 87'	Stadium: Gamla Ullevi; Attendance: 0 Referee: Kristoffer Karlsson

13 September 2020 Round 20	Falkenbergs FF	0–3	IFK Göteborg	Falkenberg
14:30		Report	Farnerud 23'; Wede 40' (o.g.); Sana 77' (pen.)	Stadium: Falcon Alkoholfri Arena; Attendance: 0 Referee: Mohammed Al-Hakim

20 September 2020 Round 21	IFK Göteborg	1–2	Kalmar FF	Gothenburg
17:30	Wernbloom 90+2'	Report	Kouakou 40' (o.g.); Magnusson 65'	Stadium: Gamla Ullevi; Attendance: 0 Referee: Kaspar Sjöberg

27 September 2020 Round 22	IF Elfsborg	0–0	IFK Göteborg	Borås
17:30		Report		Stadium: Borås Arena; Attendance: 0 Referee: Andreas Ekberg

4 October 2020 Round 23	IFK Göteborg	1–0	Varbergs BoIS	Gothenburg
17:30	Erlingmark 39'	Report		Stadium: Gamla Ullevi; Attendance: 0 Referee: Victor Wolf

18 October 2020 Round 24	AIK	2–0	IFK Göteborg	Solna
17:30	Rogić 4'; Goitom 61'	Report		Stadium: Friends Arena; Attendance: 0 Referee: Mohammed Al-Hakim

25 October 2020 Round 25	Malmö FF	3–1	IFK Göteborg	Malmö
17:30 UTC+1	Christiansen 3' (pen.); Toivonen 35'; Calisir 64' (o.g.)	Report	Wernbloom 23'	Stadium: Stadion; Attendance: 0 Referee: Victor Wolf

1 November 2020 Round 26	IFK Göteborg	0–1	Örebro SK	Gothenburg
17:30 UTC+1		Report	Besara 2'	Stadium: Gamla Ullevi; Attendance: 0 Referee: Adam Ladebäck

8 November 2020 Round 27	Helsingborgs IF	0–1	IFK Göteborg	Helsingborg
17:30 UTC+1		Report	Holm 33'	Stadium: Olympia; Attendance: 0 Referee: Mohammed Al-Hakim

23 November 2020 Round 28	IFK Göteborg	1–1	BK Häcken	Gothenburg
19:00 UTC+1	Abraham 18'	Report	Bengtsson 9'	Stadium: Gamla Ullevi; Attendance: 0 Referee: Kristoffer Karlsson

29 November 2020 Round 29	Östersunds FK	0–4	IFK Göteborg	Östersund
14:30 UTC+1		Report	Holm 26'; Abraham 33'; Farnerud 59'; Bjärsmyr 71'	Stadium: Jämtkraft Arena; Attendance: 0 Referee: Victor Wolf

6 December 2020 Round 30	IFK Göteborg	2–0	IK Sirius	Gothenburg
14:30 UTC+1	Bjärsmyr 11', 80'	Report		Stadium: Gamla Ullevi; Attendance: 0 Referee: Bojan Pandžić

=== Svenska Cupen ===
==== 2019–20 ====
The tournament continued from the 2019 season.

Kickoff times are in UTC+1 unless stated otherwise.

===== Group stage =====
Pos	Team	Pld	W	D	L	GF	GA	GD	Pts	Qualification	IFKG	VSK	IKS	SFK
1	IFK Göteborg	3	2	1	0	5	1	+4	7	Advance to Knockout stage		2–0	1–1	
2	Västerås SK	3	2	0	1	7	2	+5	6					4–0
3	IK Sirius	3	1	1	1	9	5	+4	4			0–3		
4	Sollentuna FK	3	0	0	3	1	14	−13	0		0–2		1–8	

Source: Swedish Football Association
Rules for classification: 1) Points; 2) Goal difference; 3) Goals scored; 4) Head-to-head record; 5) Highest ranked team

22 February 2020 Matchday 1	IFK Göteborg	2–0	Västerås SK	Gothenburg
16:30	Kharaishvili 14'; Söder 27'	Report		Stadium: Valhalla IP; Attendance: 2,511; Referee: Kristoffer Karlsson

29 February 2020 Matchday 2	Sollentuna FK	0–2	IFK Göteborg	Stockholm
12:30		Report	Kharaishvili 21'; Söder 68'	Stadium: Grimsta IP; Attendance: 927; Referee: Martin Strömbergsson

7 March 2020 Matchday 3	IFK Göteborg	1–1	IK Sirius	Gothenburg
12:30	Söder 33'	Report	Andersson 37'	Stadium: Valhalla IP; Attendance: 2,625; Referee: Andreas Ekberg

===== Knockout stage =====
25 June 2020 Quarter-finals	Hammarby IF	1–3 (a.e.t.)	IFK Göteborg	Stockholm
18:00 UTC+2	Tanković 19'	Report	Aiesh 54', 104' (pen.); Abraham 108'	Stadium: Tele2 Arena; Attendance: 0 Referee: Kaspar Sjöberg

9 July 2020 Semi-finals	IF Elfsborg	0–1 (a.e.t.)	IFK Göteborg	Borås
17:45 UTC+2		Report	Wernersson 98'	Stadium: Borås Arena; Attendance: 0 Referee: Mohammed Al-Hakim

30 July 2020 Final	IFK Göteborg	2–1 (a.e.t.)	Malmö FF	Gothenburg
17:45 UTC+2	Karlsson Lagemyr 86'; Farnerud 94'	Report	Toivonen 40'	Stadium: Gamla Ullevi; Attendance: 0 Referee: Glenn Nyberg

==== 2020–21 ====
The tournament continued into the 2021 season.

===== Qualification stage =====
30 September 2020 Round 2	Husqvarna FF	1–3	IFK Göteborg	Jönköping
18:30 UTC+2	Dimitrijević 31'	Report	Erlingmark 8'; Eriksson 16'; Kouakou 27'	Stadium: Vapenvallen; Attendance: 49; Referee: Richard Sundell

=== UEFA Europa League ===
==== Qualifying phase and play-off round ====
17 September 2020 Second qualifying round	IFK Göteborg (Sweden)	1–2	(Denmark) Copenhagen	Gothenburg, Sweden
18:00 UTC+2	Sana 73'	Report	Mudražija 83'; Wind 85'	Stadium: Ullevi; Attendance: 0 Referee: Guillermo Cuadra Fernández (Spain)

== Non-competitive ==
=== Pre-season ===
Kickoff times are in UTC+1 unless stated otherwise.

26 January 2020 Friendly	IFK Göteborg (Sweden)	2–3	(Denmark) AaB	Gothenburg, Sweden
14:00	Sana 58'; Affane 83' (pen.)	Report	Abildgaard 45'; Kaufmann 65'; Tengstedt 72'	Stadium: Prioritet Serneke Arena; Attendance: 1,915; Referee: Bojan Pandžić

1 February 2020 Friendly	Sarpsborg 08 (Norway)	1–0	(Sweden) IFK Göteborg	Sarpsborg, Norway
13:00	Coulibaly 7'	Report		Stadium: Sarpsborg Stadion; Attendance: 922; Referee: Tom Harald Hagen (Norway)

8 February 2020 Friendly	IFK Göteborg	2–2	Helsingborgs IF	Gothenburg, Sweden
12:30	Söder 24'; Sana 64'	Report	Abubakari 30'; Hendriksson 86'	Stadium: Bravida Arena; Attendance: 1,628; Referee: Glenn Nyberg

13 February 2020 Friendly	Louletano (Portugal)	2–1	(Sweden) IFK Göteborg	Faro/Loulé, Portugal
10:30 UTC±0	Castro 65', 66'	Report	Abraham 45'	Stadium: Estádio Algarve; Attendance: 25; Referee: Nuno Alvo (Portugal)
