= 2018 IFK Göteborg season =

IFK Göteborg
2018 season
- Chairman: Mats Engström
- Head coach: Poya Asbaghi
- Stadium: Gamla Ullevi
- Allsvenskan: 11th
- 2017–18 Svenska Cupen: Quarter-finals
- Top goalscorer: League: Giorgi Kharaishvili (9); All: Giorgi Kharaishvili; Elías Már Ómarsson (9)
- Highest home attendance: 15,467 vs. Hammarby IF (10 April 2018, Allsvenskan)
- Lowest home attendance: 2,041 vs. Östers IF (24 February 2018, Svenska Cupen); Allsvenskan: 6,172 vs. GIF Sundsvall (26 October 2018)
- Average home league attendance: 9,978
Home colours	Away colours	Third colours

The 2018 season was IFK Göteborg's 113th in existence, their 86th season in Allsvenskan and their 42nd consecutive season in the league. They competed in Allsvenskan and Svenska Cupen.

== Players ==
=== Squad ===
Note: Flags indicate national team as defined under FIFA eligibility rules; some limited exceptions apply. Players may hold more than one non-FIFA nationality.

No.	Pos.	Nation	Player
2	DF	SWE	Emil Salomonsson (3rd captain)
3	DF	SWE	Billy Nordström
4	DF	SWE	Carl Starfelt
5	DF	SWE	Kristopher Da Graca
6	MF	NOR	Fredrik Oldrup Jensen (on loan from Zulte Waregem)
7	FW	SWE	Tobias Hysén (vice-captain)
8	MF	NOR	Vajebah Sakor
9	FW	SWE	Robin Söder
10	FW	SWE	Patrik Karlsson Lagemyr
11	MF	SWE	Amin Affane
14	FW	SWE	Benjamin Nygren

No.	Pos.	Nation	Player
15	DF	SWE	Marcus Degerlund (on loan from Hammarby IF)
16	FW	SWE	Sargon Abraham
19	MF	SWE	August Erlingmark
20	DF	SWE	Victor Wernersson
22	FW	GEO	Giorgi Kharaishvili (on loan from Saburtalo Tbilisi)
23	DF	SWE	David Boo Wiklander (captain)
24	FW	SWE	Sebastian Ohlsson
25	GK	SWE	Erik Dahlin
26	DF	ARM	André Calisir
28	MF	NGA	Alhassan Yusuf
31	GK	SWE	Tom Amos

== Club ==
=== Other information ===
Chairman	(Sweden) Mats Engström
Club director	(Sweden) Max Markusson
Director of sports	(Sweden) Jonas Olsson (caretaker)
Ground (capacity and dimensions)	Gamla Ullevi (18,600 / 105x68 m)

Source: IFK Göteborg and Gamla Ullevi

== Competitions ==
=== Overall ===
Competition	Started round	Final position / round	First match	Last match
Allsvenskan	N/A	11th	1 April 2018	11 November 2018
2017–18 Svenska Cupen	Round 2	Quarter-finals	23 August 2017	10 March 2018

Source: Competitions

=== Allsvenskan ===
==== League table ====
Pos	Team	Pld	W	D	L	GF	GA	GD	Pts
9	Örebro SK	30	9	8	13	34	40	−6	35
10	Kalmar FF	30	9	7	14	27	35	−8	34
11	IFK Göteborg	30	9	4	17	38	53	−15	31
12	IF Elfsborg	30	7	9	14	29	41	−12	30
13	IK Sirius	30	8	6	16	37	61	−24	30

Source: svenskfotboll.se (in Swedish)
Rules for classification: 1) Points; 2) Goal difference; 3) Goals scored; 4) Head-to-head points; 5) Head-to-head goal difference; 6) Head-to-head away goals scored; 7) Play-off
(Note: Play-off is only played if need to decide champion, teams for relegation or UEFA competition and will be played on a neutral ground).

==== Results summary ====
Overall								Home						Away					
Pld	W	D	L	GF	GA	GD	Pts	W	D	L	GF	GA	GD	W	D	L	GF	GA	GD
30	9	4	17	38	53	−15	31	5	2	8	20	26	−6	4	2	9	18	27	−9

Source: svenskfotboll.se (in Swedish)

==== Results by round ====
Round	1	2	3	4	5	6	7	8	9	10	11	12	13	14	15	16	17	18	19	20	21	22	23	24	25	26	27	28	29	30
Ground	A	H	A	H	A	H	A	H	A	H	A	H	H	A	H	A	H	H	A	A	H	A	H	A	H	A	H	A	H	A
Result	W	L	L	W	L	W	W	L	D	L	L	L	W	L	W	L	L	W	L	D	D	L	L	L	D	W	L	L	L	W
Position	2	7	9	7	10	7	7	8	9	10	10	12	12	12	11	11	11	10	11	11	11	11	12	12	12	12	13	13	13	11

Source: see below
A = Away; H = Home; W = Win; D = Draw; L = Loss

==== Matches ====
Kickoff times are in UTC+2 unless stated otherwise.

1 April 2018 Round 1	Trelleborgs FF	1–3	IFK Göteborg	Trelleborg
17:30	Jovanović 43'	Report	Ómarsson 21', 49'; Sakor 72'	Stadium: Vångavallen; Attendance: 5,509; Referee: Kristoffer Karlsson

10 April 2018 Round 2	IFK Göteborg	1–2	Hammarby IF	Gothenburg
19:00	Diskerud 60'	Report	Paulsen 62'; Hamad 90+1'	Stadium: Gamla Ullevi; Attendance: 15,467; Referee: Mohammed Al-Hakim

15 April 2018 Round 3	Östersunds FK	2–1	IFK Göteborg	Östersund
17:30	Edwards 58'; Ghoddos 64'	Report	Diskerud 73'	Stadium: Jämtkraft Arena; Attendance: 5,048; Referee: Andreas Ekberg

19 April 2018 Round 4	IFK Göteborg	1–0	Dalkurd FF	Gothenburg
19:00	Engvall 45+1'	Report		Stadium: Gamla Ullevi; Attendance: 9,165; Referee: Kristoffer Karlsson

22 April 2018 Round 5	AIK	2–0	IFK Göteborg	Solna
17:30	Silva 20'; Olsson 50'	Report		Stadium: Friends Arena; Attendance: 19,619; Referee: Mohammed Al-Hakim

28 April 2018 Round 6	IFK Göteborg	2–1	BK Häcken	Gothenburg
16:00	Ómarsson 15', 60'	Report	Paulinho 90'	Stadium: Gamla Ullevi; Attendance: 12,852; Referee: Andreas Ekberg

7 May 2018 Round 7	Malmö FF	1–2	IFK Göteborg	Malmö
19:00	Strandberg 54'	Report	Wernersson 42'; Erlingmark 58'	Stadium: Stadion; Attendance: 17,715; Referee: Stefan Johannesson

13 May 2018 Round 8	IFK Göteborg	0–2	IFK Norrköping	Gothenburg
15:00		Report	Holmberg 47'; Skrabb 90+5'	Stadium: Gamla Ullevi; Attendance: 11,925; Referee: Kaspar Sjöberg

21 May 2018 Round 9	IF Elfsborg	1–1	IFK Göteborg	Borås
19:00	Frick 90+5'	Report	Kharaishvili 63'	Stadium: Borås Arena; Attendance: 11,735; Referee: Martin Strömbergsson

24 May 2018 Round 10	IFK Göteborg	1–3	Djurgårdens IF	Gothenburg
19:00	Hysén 75'	Report	Mrabti 3'; Beijmo 22'; Ring 54'	Stadium: Gamla Ullevi; Attendance: 12,268; Referee: Mohammed Al-Hakim

27 May 2018 Round 11	GIF Sundsvall	2–0	IFK Göteborg	Sundsvall
15:00	Gall 34'; Batanero 59'	Report		Stadium: Idrottsparken; Attendance: 3,596; Referee: Kaspar Sjöberg

8 July 2018 Round 12	IFK Göteborg	1–3	Kalmar FF	Gothenburg
15:00	Affane 73'	Report	Diouf 10'; Eriksson 64'; Magnusson 70'	Stadium: Gamla Ullevi; Attendance: 7,298; Referee: Kristoffer Karlsson

14 July 2018 Round 13	IFK Göteborg	2–0	Örebro SK	Gothenburg
20:00	Kharaishvili 29'; Ómarsson 90+2'	Report		Stadium: Gamla Ullevi; Attendance: 6,479; Referee: Martin Strömbergsson

22 July 2018 Round 14	IK Sirius	3–2	IFK Göteborg	Uppsala
17:30	Haglund 45+2'; Arvidsson 56' (pen.), 76' (pen.)	Report	Salomonsson 12' (pen.); Kharaishvili 37'	Stadium: Studenternas IP; Attendance: 4,112; Referee: Mohammed Al-Hakim

28 July 2018 Round 15	IFK Göteborg	3–0	IF Brommapojkarna	Gothenburg
16:00	Ómarsson 20', 85', 88'	Report		Stadium: Gamla Ullevi; Attendance: 7,425; Referee: Patrik Eriksson

4 August 2018 Round 16	Kalmar FF	2–1	IFK Göteborg	Kalmar
16:00	Romário 50' (pen.); Fejzullahu 68'	Report	Sakor 58'	Stadium: Guldfågeln Arena; Attendance: 6,459; Referee: Kristoffer Karlsson

10 August 2018 Round 17	IFK Göteborg	2–3	IK Sirius	Gothenburg
19:00	Karlsson Lagemyr 47'; Ohlsson 57'	Report	Ogbu 65'; Haglund 80'; Lundholm 87'	Stadium: Gamla Ullevi; Attendance: 9,357; Referee: Glenn Nyberg

20 August 2018 Round 18	IFK Göteborg	2–1	Östersunds FK	Gothenburg
19:00	Kharaishvili 21'; Sakor 45+1'	Report	Widgren 25'	Stadium: Gamla Ullevi; Attendance: 8,114; Referee: Stefan Johannesson

27 August 2018 Round 19	IFK Norrköping	2–1	IFK Göteborg	Norrköping
19:00	Moberg Karlsson 90' (pen.); Larsen 90+6'	Report	Abraham 75'	Stadium: Nya Parken; Attendance: 9,541; Referee: Bojan Pandžić

2 September 2018 Round 20	Dalkurd FF	1–1	IFK Göteborg	Gävle
15:00	Strand 33'	Report	Kharaishvili 90' (pen.)	Stadium: Gavlevallen; Attendance: 728; Referee: Kaspar Sjöberg

16 September 2018 Round 21	IFK Göteborg	2–2	IF Elfsborg	Gothenburg
17:30	Söder 70'; Kharaishvili 86' (pen.)	Report	Obasi 23'; Frick 33'	Stadium: Gamla Ullevi; Attendance: 10,096; Referee: Mohammed Al-Hakim

24 September 2018 Round 22	BK Häcken	4–1	IFK Göteborg	Gothenburg
19:00	Lundberg 26', 63'; Irandust 33'; Jeremejeff 48'	Report	Söder 69'	Stadium: Bravida Arena; Attendance: 6,142; Referee: Andreas Ekberg

27 September 2018 Round 23	IFK Göteborg	0–2	AIK	Gothenburg
19:00		Report	Elyounoussi 24'; Goitom 89'	Stadium: Gamla Ullevi; Attendance: 12,104; Referee: Martin Strömbergsson

1 October 2018 Round 24	Hammarby IF	3–0	IFK Göteborg	Stockholm
19:00	Paulsen 26'; Hamad 72' (pen.); Bakircioglu 79'	Report		Stadium: Tele2 Arena; Attendance: 18,973; Referee: Bojan Pandžić

6 October 2018 Round 25	IFK Göteborg	2–2	Trelleborgs FF	Gothenburg
16:00	Ohlsson 3'; Kharaishvili 90+10'	Report	R. Nilsson 31'; Hörberg 80'	Stadium: Gamla Ullevi; Attendance: 7,889; Referee: Patrik Eriksson

22 October 2018 Round 26	IF Brommapojkarna	0–2	IFK Göteborg	Stockholm
19:00		Report	Ohlsson 25'; Wernersson 59'	Stadium: Grimsta IP; Attendance: 2,308; Referee: Andreas Ekberg

26 October 2018 Round 27	IFK Göteborg	1–2	GIF Sundsvall	Gothenburg
19:00	Kharaishvili 87' (pen.)	Report	Hallenius 5', 17'	Stadium: Gamla Ullevi; Attendance: 6,172; Referee: Glenn Nyberg

31 October 2018 Round 28	Djurgårdens IF	2–0	IFK Göteborg	Stockholm
19:00 UTC+1	Badji 9', 45'	Report		Stadium: Tele2 Arena; Attendance: 8,751; Referee: Kristoffer Karlsson

4 November 2018 Round 29	IFK Göteborg	0–3	Malmö FF	Gothenburg
15:00 UTC+1		Report	Gall 65'; Rieks 71'; Rosenberg 80' (pen.)	Stadium: Gamla Ullevi; Attendance: 13,073; Referee: Martin Strömbergsson

11 November 2018 Round 30	Örebro SK	1–3	IFK Göteborg	Örebro
15:00 UTC+1	Boo Wiklander 84' (o.g.)	Report	Nygren 7', 89'; Kharaishvili 57' (pen.)	Stadium: Eyravallen; Attendance: 4,129; Referee: Johan Hamlin

=== Svenska Cupen ===
==== 2017–18 ====
The tournament continued from the 2017 season.

Kickoff times are in UTC+1.

===== Group stage =====
Pos	Team	Pld	W	D	L	GF	GA	GD	Pts	Qualification	IFKG	ÖIF	VAR	IKS
1	IFK Göteborg	3	1	2	0	4	3	+1	5	Advance to Knockout stage	—	1–1	1–0	—
2	Östers IF	3	1	2	0	4	3	+1	5		—	—	2–1	—
3	Varbergs BoIS	3	1	0	2	3	4	−1	3		—	—	—	2–1
4	IK Sirius	3	0	2	1	4	5	−1	2		2–2	1–1	—	—

Source: Swedish Football Association
Rules for classification: 1) Points; 2) Goal difference; 3) Goals scored; 4) Head-to-head record; 5) Highest ranked team

17 February 2018 Matchday 1	IFK Göteborg	1–0	Varbergs BoIS	Gothenburg
16:00	Diskerud 75'	Report		Stadium: Bravida Arena; Attendance: 2,410; Referee: Kristoffer Karlsson

24 February 2018 Matchday 2	IFK Göteborg	1–1	Östers IF	Gothenburg
14:00	Diskerud 67'	Report	Helg 19'	Stadium: Bravida Arena; Attendance: 2,041; Referee: Adam Ladebäck

4 March 2018 Matchday 3	IK Sirius	2–2	IFK Göteborg	Uppsala
17:00	Arvidsson 50' (pen.); Nygren 90+1'	Report	Ómarsson 54'; Ohlsson 80'	Stadium: Lötens IP; Attendance: 1,221; Referee: Mohammed Al-Hakim

===== Knockout stage =====
10 March 2018 Quarter-finals	Malmö FF	1–0	IFK Göteborg	Malmö
13:00	Nielsen 18'	Report		Stadium: Malmö IP; Attendance: 4,135; Referee: Glenn Nyberg

==== 2018–19 ====
The tournament continued into the 2019 season.

===== Qualification stage =====
23 August 2018 Round 2	Torns IF	0–4	IFK Göteborg	Lund
18:30 UTC+2		Report	Abraham 8'; Wernersson 73'; Degerlund 76'; Ohlsson 85'	Stadium: Klostergårdens IP; Attendance: 2,203; Referee: Robert Daradić

== Non-competitive ==
=== Pre-season ===
Kickoff times are in UTC+1.

20 January 2018 Friendly	IFK Göteborg (Sweden)	1–3	(Denmark) AaB	Gothenburg, Sweden
13:00	Salomonsson 31'	Report	Rolim 32'; Šafranko 51'; Kristensen 80'	Stadium: Prioritet Serneke Arena; Attendance: 2,032; Referee: Granit Maqedonci

27 January 2018 Friendly	IFK Göteborg (Sweden)	3–2	(Norway) Stabæk	Gothenburg, Sweden
16:00	Salomonsson 43' (pen.); Ohlsson 78', 89'	Report	Gyasi 4'; Sæter 10'	Stadium: Prioritet Serneke Arena; Attendance: 1,755; Referee: Robert Daradić

3 February 2018 Friendly	IFK Göteborg (Sweden)	2–1	(Denmark) OB	San Pedro del Pinatar, Spain
16:00	Ómarsson 68'; Salomonsson 72' (pen.)	Report	Festersen 62'	Stadium: Pinatar Football Center; Attendance: 78; Referee: Salvador Lax Franco (Spain)

9 February 2018 Friendly	Meizhou Meixian Techand (China)	1–3	(Sweden) IFK Göteborg	San Pedro del Pinatar, Spain
16:00	Muriqui 27'	Report	Ómarsson 14'; Affane 24'; Nordström 61'	Stadium: Pinatar Football Center; Referee: José Joaquín Gallego Gambín (Spain)

16 March 2018 Friendly	IFK Göteborg	3–0	IF Brommapojkarna	Gothenburg, Sweden
17:00	Ómarsson 7', 33'; Kharaishvili 86'	Report		Stadium: Bravida Arena; Attendance: 474; Referee: Robert Daradić

24 March 2018 Friendly	IFK Göteborg	1–0	Örgryte IS	Gothenburg, Sweden
13:00	Nygren 76'	Report		Stadium: Gamla Ullevi; Attendance: 9,855; Referee: Kaspar Sjöberg

=== Mid-season ===
Kickoff times are in UTC+2.

11 June 2018 Friendly	Dalakombination	1–8	IFK Göteborg	Nyhammar, Sweden
19:00	Eriksson 4'	Report	Ómarsson 3'; Ingebrigtsen 40', 50'; Yusuf 46', 59'; Nygren 52', 69'; Diskerud 86'	Stadium: Åvallen; Attendance: 200; Referee: Erik Nordqvist

16 June 2018 Friendly	IFK Göteborg	1–2	Djurgårdens IF	Borlänge, Sweden
15:00	Hysén 65'	Report	Chilufya 22'; Radetinac 39'	Stadium: Kvarnsvedens IP; Attendance: 674; Referee: Glenn Nyberg

30 June 2018 Friendly	Bodens BK	1–4	IFK Göteborg	Boden, Sweden
16:00	Selini 70'	Report	Kharaishvili 30', 52', 61' (pen.); Ingebrigtsen 67'	Stadium: Boden Arena; Attendance: 1,032; Referee: Joel Bäckström
