= 2019 IFK Göteborg season =

IFK Göteborg
2019 season
- Chairman: Mats Engström
- Head coach: Poya Asbaghi
- Stadium: Gamla Ullevi
- Allsvenskan: 7th
- 2018–19 Svenska Cupen: Group stage
- Top goalscorer: League: Robin Söder (14); All: Robin Söder (14)
- Highest home attendance: 17,222 vs. IF Elfsborg (7 April 2019, Allsvenskan)
- Lowest home attendance: 9,248 vs. GIF Sundsvall (6 July 2019, Allsvenskan)
- Average home league attendance: 12,837
- Biggest win: 7–1 vs. Östersunds FK (2 November 2019, Allsvenskan)
- Biggest defeat: 2–6 vs. Hammarby IF (15 September 2019, Allsvenskan)
Home colours	Away colours	Third colours

The 2019 season was IFK Göteborg's 114th in existence, their 87th season in Allsvenskan and their 43rd consecutive season in the league. They competed in Allsvenskan and Svenska Cupen.

== Players ==
=== Squad ===
Note: Flags indicate national team as defined under FIFA eligibility rules; some limited exceptions apply. Players may hold more than one non-FIFA nationality.

No.	Pos.	Nation	Player
1	GK	GRE	Giannis Anestis
3	MF	SWE	Adil Titi
5	DF	SWE	Kristopher Da Graca
6	DF	SWE	Rasmus Wikström
7	MF	SWE	Sebastian Eriksson (vice-captain)
8	MF	SWE	Hosam Aiesh
9	FW	SWE	Robin Söder (3rd captain)
10	FW	SWE	Patrik Karlsson Lagemyr
16	FW	SWE	Sargon Abraham
17	DF	SWE	Edvin Dahlqvist
19	MF	SWE	August Erlingmark

No.	Pos.	Nation	Player
20	DF	SWE	Victor Wernersson
21	MF	SWE	Noah Alexandersson
22	FW	GEO	Giorgi Kharaishvili
23	DF	SWE	Emil Holm
26	DF	ARM	André Calisir
27	MF	COD	Nzuzi Toko
28	MF	NGR	Alhassan Yusuf
29	FW	DEN	Lasse Vibe (captain)
31	GK	SWE	Tom Amos
89	MF	SWE	Tobias Sana

== Club ==
=== Other information ===
Chairman	(Sweden) Mats Engström
Club director	(Sweden) Max Markusson
Director of sports	(Sweden) Kennet Andersson
Assistant director of sports	(Sweden) Pontus Farnerud
Ground (capacity and dimensions)	Gamla Ullevi (18,600 / 105x68 m)

Source: IFK Göteborg and Gamla Ullevi

== Competitions ==
=== Overall ===
Competition	Started round	Final position / round	First match	Last match
Allsvenskan	N/A	7th	31 March 2019	2 November 2019
2018–19 Svenska Cupen	Round 2	Group stage	23 August 2018	3 March 2019

Source: Competitions

=== Allsvenskan ===
==== League table ====
Pos	Team	Pld	W	D	L	GF	GA	GD	Pts	Qualification or relegation
5	IFK Norrköping	30	16	9	5	54	26	+28	57	
6	BK Häcken	30	14	7	9	44	29	+15	49	
7	IFK Göteborg	30	13	9	8	46	31	+15	48	Qualification for the Europa League second qualifying round (Note: IFK Göteborg qualified for the Europa League second qualifying round by winning the 2019–20 Svenska Cupen.)
8	IF Elfsborg	30	11	10	9	44	45	−1	43	
9	Örebro SK	30	9	6	15	40	56	−16	33	

Source: svenskfotboll.se (in Swedish)
Rules for classification: 1) Points; 2) Goal difference; 3) Goals scored; 4) Head-to-head points; 5) Head-to-head goal difference; 6) Head-to-head away goals scored; 7) Play-off
(Note: Play-off is only played if need to decide champion, teams for relegation or UEFA competition and will be played on a neutral ground).

==== Results summary ====
Overall								Home						Away					
Pld	W	D	L	GF	GA	GD	Pts	W	D	L	GF	GA	GD	W	D	L	GF	GA	GD
30	13	9	8	46	31	+15	48	8	5	2	26	7	+19	5	4	6	20	24	−4

Source: svenskfotboll.se (in Swedish)

==== Results by round ====
Round	1	2	3	4	5	6	7	8	9	10	11	12	13	14	15	16	17	18	19	20	21	22	23	24	25	26	27	28	29	30
Ground	A	H	A	H	A	H	A	A	H	H	A	H	A	H	A	H	H	A	H	A	H	A	A	H	A	H	A	H	A	H
Result	L	W	L	W	D	W	W	W	D	D	W	L	D	W	D	W	D	D	D	W	W	W	L	W	L	D	L	L	L	W
Position	14	8	11	4	6	5	2	2	2	4	2	4	5	4	5	5	5	6	6	6	6	6	6	6	7	7	7	7	7	7

Source: see below
A = Away; H = Home; W = Win; D = Draw; L = Loss

==== Matches ====
Kickoff times are in UTC+2 unless stated otherwise.

31 March 2019 Round 1	AFC Eskilstuna	3–1	IFK Göteborg	Eskilstuna
17:30	Avdić 26'; Nnamani 51'; Nalić 90+1'	Report	Söder 84'	Stadium: Tunavallen; Attendance: 3,897; Referee: Kristoffer Karlsson

7 April 2019 Round 2	IFK Göteborg	3–0	IF Elfsborg	Gothenburg
15:00	Karlsson Lagemyr 23'; Nygren 26'; Ohlsson 74'	Report		Stadium: Ullevi; Attendance: 17,222; Referee: Kaspar Sjöberg

15 April 2019 Round 3	Djurgårdens IF	2–1	IFK Göteborg	Stockholm
19:00	Ulvestad 50'; Buya Turay 88'	Report	Nygren 82'	Stadium: Tele2 Arena; Attendance: 13,575; Referee: Andreas Ekberg

22 April 2019 Round 4	IFK Göteborg	3–1	Helsingborgs IF	Gothenburg
15:00	Vibe 11'; Starfelt 16'; Nygren 64' (pen.)	Report	Svensson 90+1'	Stadium: Ullevi; Attendance: 13,340; Referee: Kaspar Sjöberg

25 April 2019 Round 5	Kalmar FF	1–1	IFK Göteborg	Kalmar
19:00	Diouf 65'	Report	Calisir 89'	Stadium: Guldfågeln Arena; Attendance: 4,716; Referee: Victor Wolf

29 April 2019 Round 6	IFK Göteborg	3–0	AIK	Gothenburg
19:00	Kharaishvili 45+1'; Karlsson Lagemyr 65'; Abraham 81'	Report		Stadium: Ullevi; Attendance: 15,311; Referee: Kristoffer Karlsson

4 May 2019 Round 7	IK Sirius	2–4	IFK Göteborg	Uppsala
16:00	Calisir 25' (o.g.); Lindberg 26'	Report	Kharaishvili 2'; Saebbö 51'; Karlsson Lagemyr 77'; Nygren 90+1'	Stadium: Studenternas IP; Attendance: 4,632; Referee: Patrik Eriksson

13 May 2019 Round 8	IFK Norrköping	1–2	IFK Göteborg	Norrköping
19:00	Krogh Gerson 39'	Report	Karlsson Lagemyr 10'; Kharaishvili 83'	Stadium: Nya Parken; Attendance: 8,752; Referee: Glenn Nyberg

16 May 2019 Round 9	IFK Göteborg	0–0	Malmö FF	Gothenburg
19:00		Report		Stadium: Gamla Ullevi; Attendance: 17,083; Referee: Martin Strömbergsson

20 May 2019 Round 10	IFK Göteborg	0–0	Hammarby IF	Gothenburg
19:00		Report		Stadium: Gamla Ullevi; Attendance: 14,136; Referee: Andreas Ekberg

25 May 2019 Round 11	BK Häcken	1–2	IFK Göteborg	Gothenburg
16:00	Jeremejeff 71'	Report	Vibe 9'; Söder 90+7'	Stadium: Bravida Arena; Attendance: 6,316; Referee: Mohammed Al-Hakim

1 June 2019 Round 12	IFK Göteborg	0–1	Örebro SK	Gothenburg
16:00		Report	Rogić 45'	Stadium: Gamla Ullevi; Attendance: 13,917; Referee: Victor Wolf

29 June 2019 Round 13	Östersunds FK	0–0	IFK Göteborg	Östersund
16:00		Report		Stadium: Jämtkraft Arena; Attendance: 5,093; Referee: Kristoffer Karlsson

6 July 2019 Round 14	IFK Göteborg	2–1	GIF Sundsvall	Gothenburg
16:00	Eriksson 25'; Calisir 44'	Report	Wilson 89'	Stadium: Gamla Ullevi; Attendance: 9,248; Referee: Kristoffer Karlsson

13 July 2019 Round 15	Falkenbergs FF	1–1	IFK Göteborg	Falkenberg
16:00	C. Johansson 90+6'	Report	Söder 48'	Stadium: Falcon Alkoholfri Arena; Attendance: 6,214; Referee: Adam Ladebäck

21 July 2019 Round 16	IFK Göteborg	1–0	AFC Eskilstuna	Gothenburg
15:00	Söder 37'	Report		Stadium: Gamla Ullevi; Attendance: 9,763; Referee: Fredrik Klitte

28 July 2019 Round 17	IFK Göteborg	0–0	IFK Norrköping	Gothenburg
17:30		Report		Stadium: Gamla Ullevi; Attendance: 14,089; Referee: Kaspar Sjöberg

5 August 2019 Round 18	Örebro SK	2–2	IFK Göteborg	Örebro
19:00	Larsson 82'; Wright 90+4'	Report	Söder 41', 63'	Stadium: Eyravallen; Attendance: 7,261; Referee: Bojan Pandžić

12 August 2019 Round 19	IFK Göteborg	1–1	Falkenbergs FF	Gothenburg
19:00	Söder 68'	Report	Björkengren 15'	Stadium: Gamla Ullevi; Attendance: 10,757; Referee: Glenn Nyberg

19 August 2019 Round 20	Helsingborgs IF	1–2	IFK Göteborg	Helsingborg
19:00	Svensson 45+2'	Report	Söder 71'; Vibe 88'	Stadium: Olympia; Attendance: 9,094; Referee: Andreas Ekberg

26 August 2019 Round 21	IFK Göteborg	4–0	Kalmar FF	Gothenburg
19:00	Söder 43', 55', 72'; Kharaishvili 61'	Report		Stadium: Gamla Ullevi; Attendance: 11,061; Referee: Victor Wolf

1 September 2019 Round 22	GIF Sundsvall	0–2	IFK Göteborg	Sundsvall
15:00		Report	Kharaishvili 38'; Aiesh 49'	Stadium: Idrottsparken; Attendance: 3,580; Referee: Fredrik Klitte

15 September 2019 Round 23	Hammarby IF	6–2	IFK Göteborg	Stockholm
15:00	Rodić 2'; Bojanić 7'; Khalili 13'; Magyar 55'; Fenger 61'; Tanković 85'	Report	Kharaishvili 19', 57'	Stadium: Tele2 Arena; Attendance: 26,552; Referee: Kristoffer Karlsson

21 September 2019 Round 24	IFK Göteborg	2–1	IK Sirius	Gothenburg
18:00	Vibe 12'; Söder 29'	Report	Ceesay 51'	Stadium: Gamla Ullevi; Attendance: 10,052; Referee: Kaspar Sjöberg

25 September 2019 Round 25	AIK	1–0	IFK Göteborg	Solna
19:00	Larsson 20' (pen.)	Report		Stadium: Friends Arena; Attendance: 18,068; Referee: Andreas Ekberg

29 September 2019 Round 26	IFK Göteborg	0–0	BK Häcken	Gothenburg
15:00		Report		Stadium: Gamla Ullevi; Attendance: 13,514; Referee: Bojan Pandžić

6 October 2019 Round 27	Malmö FF	1–0	IFK Göteborg	Malmö
17:30	Beijmo 62'	Report		Stadium: Stadion; Attendance: 18,473; Referee: Martin Strömbergsson

21 October 2019 Round 28	IFK Göteborg	0–1	Djurgårdens IF	Gothenburg
19:00		Report	Buya Turay 70'	Stadium: Gamla Ullevi; Attendance: 13,438; Referee: Kristoffer Karlsson

28 October 2019 Round 29	IF Elfsborg	2–0	IFK Göteborg	Borås
19:00 UTC+1	Alm 34'; Karlsson 50'	Report		Stadium: Borås Arena; Attendance: 10,167; Referee: Kaspar Sjöberg

2 November 2019 Round 30	IFK Göteborg	7–1	Östersunds FK	Gothenburg
13:00 UTC+1	Isherwood 15' (o.g.); Söder 34', 82'; Vibe 53'; Eriksson 69'; Yusuf 85', 90'	Report	Kadiri 24'	Stadium: Gamla Ullevi; Attendance: 9,629; Referee: Stefan Johannesson

=== Svenska Cupen ===
==== 2018–19 ====
The tournament continued from the 2018 season.

Kickoff times are in UTC+1.

===== Group stage =====
Pos	Team	Pld	W	D	L	GF	GA	GD	Pts	Qualification	GAIS	ÖSK	IFKG	NBIS
1	GAIS	3	2	0	1	8	5	+3	6	Advance to Knockout stage				4–3
2	Örebro SK	3	1	1	1	5	5	0	4		2–1		3–3	
3	IFK Göteborg	3	1	1	1	5	6	−1	4		0–3			
4	Nyköpings BIS	3	1	0	2	4	6	−2	3			1–0	0–2	

Source: Swedish Football Association
Rules for classification: 1) Points; 2) Goal difference; 3) Goals scored; 4) Head-to-head record; 5) Highest ranked team

17 February 2019 Matchday 1	Nyköpings BIS	0–2	IFK Göteborg	Nyköping
15:00		Report	Wikström 25'; Ohlsson 85'	Stadium: Rosvalla IP; Attendance: 927; Referee: Andreas Dufva-Johansson

25 February 2019 Matchday 2	IFK Göteborg	0–3; Awarded (Note: The game on 25 February was stopped near the beginning of the second half, with the score at 0–0, after fireworks set off in the stands by supporters of IFK Göteborg landed on the pitch. The abandonment of the match was declared soon afterwards. The game was originally rescheduled to 14:00 local time (UTC+1) on 26 February. GAIS appealed this, with their goalkeeper Marko Johansson said to be suffering from headaches and hearing loss as a result of the disturbance during the original match. The matter of deciding the outcome of the match was then referred to the Disciplinary Committee of the SvFF, who decided on 1 March to award a 0–3 victory to GAIS.)	GAIS	Gothenburg
19:00		Report		Stadium: Bravida Arena; Referee: Glenn Nyberg

3 March 2019 Matchday 3	Örebro SK	3–3	IFK Göteborg	Örebro
17:00	Prodell 28' (pen.); Bertilsson 35'; Björnquist 39'	Report	Prodell 30' (o.g.); Wernersson 69'; Karlsson Lagemyr 86'	Stadium: Eyravallen; Attendance: 783; Referee: Patrik Eriksson

==== 2019–20 ====
The tournament continued into the 2020 season.

===== Qualification stage =====
22 August 2019 Round 2	BK Astrio	0–4	IFK Göteborg	Halmstad
18:00 UTC+2		Report	Abraham 30'; Sana 59'; Vibe 66'; Vilhelmsson 88'	Stadium: Söndrums IP; Attendance: 1,857; Referee: Daniel Böcker

== Non-competitive ==
=== Pre-season ===
Kickoff times are in UTC+1 unless stated otherwise.

19 January 2019 Friendly	IFK Göteborg (Sweden)	2–0	(Norway) Stabæk	Gothenburg, Sweden
16:00	Affane 61'; Saebbö 88'	Report		Stadium: Prioritet Serneke Arena; Attendance: 1,532; Referee: Magnus Lindgren

26 January 2019 Friendly	IFK Göteborg (Sweden)	2–1	(Norway) Odds BK	Gothenburg, Sweden
17:00	Kharaishvili 5' (pen.); Karlsson Lagemyr 90+2'	Report	Nordkvelle 84'	Stadium: Prioritet Serneke Arena; Attendance: 1,412; Referee: Nermin Čišić

11 February 2019 Friendly	IFK Göteborg (Sweden)	0–1	(South Korea) Jeonnam Dragons	Albufeira, Portugal
16:00 UTC±0		Report	Ahn Byung-keon 90'	Stadium: Estádio da Nora; Attendance: 97; Referee: Carlos Cabral (Portugal)

8 March 2019 Friendly	IFK Göteborg	0–2	Falkenbergs FF	Gothenburg, Sweden
17:00		Report	Pogrebnyak 11'; Sylisufaj 87'	Stadium: Valhalla IP; Attendance: 723; Referee: Magnus Lindgren

16 March 2019 Friendly	Varbergs BoIS	1–1	IFK Göteborg	Tvååker, Sweden
15:00	Selmani 64'	Report	Kharaishvili 68'	Stadium: Övrevi IP; Attendance: 475; Referee: Bojan Pandžić

23 March 2019 Friendly	IFK Göteborg	1–0	Örgryte IS	Gothenburg, Sweden
13:00	Söder 56'	Report		Stadium: Ullevi; Attendance: 5,672; Referee: Granit Maqedonci

=== Mid-season ===
20 June 2019 Friendly	Helsingborgs IF	0–2	IFK Göteborg	Hässleholm, Sweden
16:00 UTC+2		Report	Kharaishvili 25'; Söder 48' (pen.)	Stadium: Österås IP; Attendance: 890; Referee: Kristoffer Karlsson
