= 2020 Svenska Cupen final =

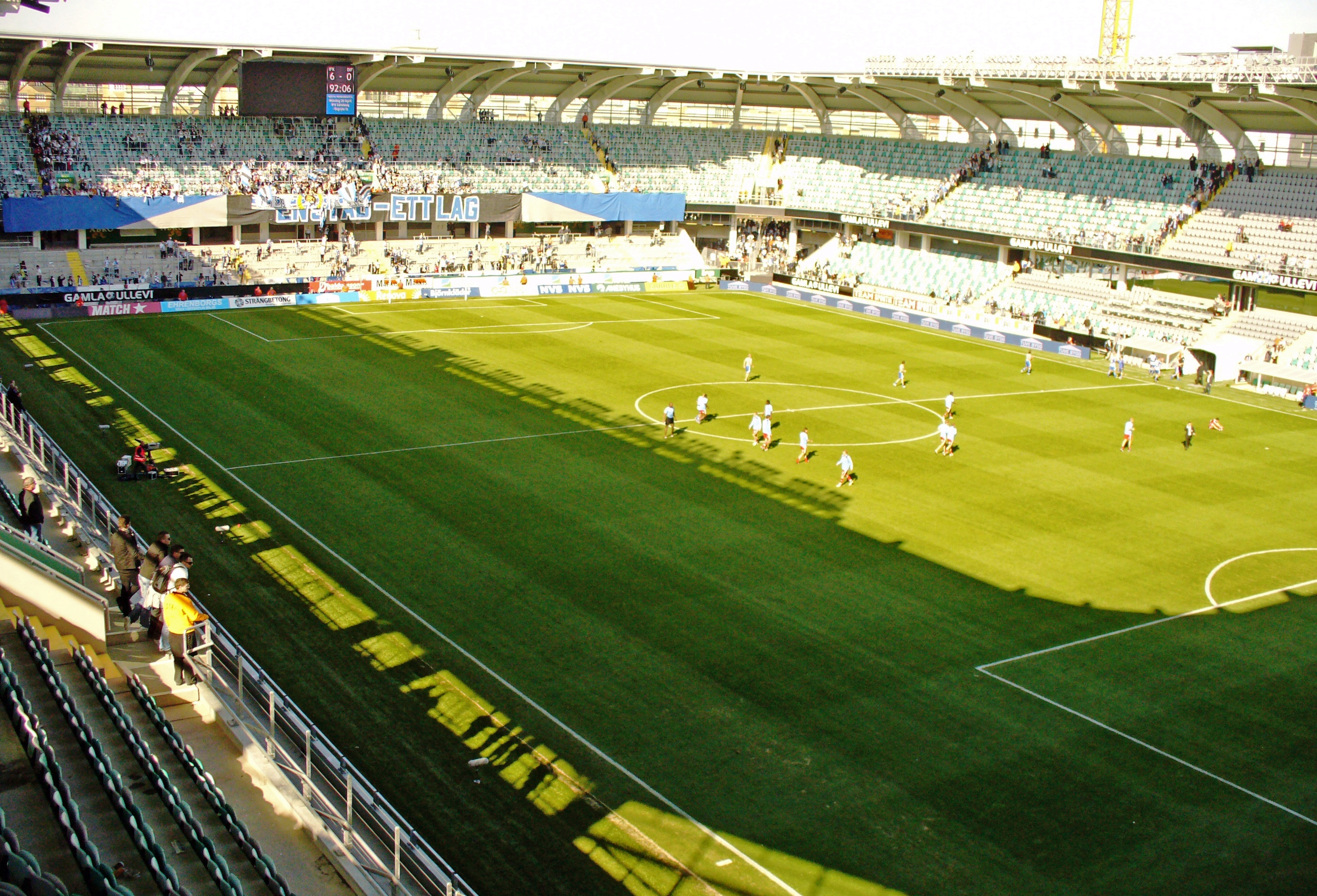
- Gamla Ullevi in Gothenburg, Sweden hosted this year's Svenska Cupen Final between IFK Göteborg and Malmö FF.
- Event: 2019–20 Svenska Cupen
IFK Göteborg	Malmö FF
2	1
- Date: 30 July 2020
- Venue: Gamla Ullevi, Gothenburg
- Referee: Glenn Nyberg
- Attendance: 0 (Note: The final was played behind closed doors due to the COVID-19 pandemic in Sweden.)
- Weather: Cloudy; 16 °C (61 °F); 74% humidity

The 2020 Svenska Cupen Final was played on 30 July 2020 between Allsvenskan clubs IFK Göteborg and Malmö FF. The match was played on Gamla Ullevi, the home ground of IFK Göteborg. The final was the culmination of the 2019–20 Svenska Cupen, the 64th season of Svenska Cupen and the eighth season with the current format. The final was initially planned for 30 April 2020 but was postponed due to the COVID-19 pandemic. As a consequence of the pandemic, the final was played without attendance.

IFK Göteborg won the match 2–1 after extra time, their eighth Svenska Cupen title, and earned a place in the second qualifying round of the 2020–21 UEFA Europa League.

== Teams ==
Team	Previous finals appearances (bold indicates winners)
IFK Göteborg	12 (**1979**, **1982**, **1983**, 1986, **1991**, 1999, 2004, 2007, **2008**, 2009, **2013**, **2015**)
Malmö FF	19 (**1944**, 1945, **1946**, **1947**, **1951**, **1953**, **1967**, 1971, **1973**, **1974**, **1975**, **1978**, **1980**, **1984**, **1986**, **1989**, 1996, 2016, 2018)

== Venue ==
Since the 2014–15 season, the venue for the Svenska Cupen final is decided in a draw between the two finalists. The draw for the final was held on 9 July 2020, immediately after the semi-finals, and decided that the final would be played at Gamla Ullevi in Gothenburg, the home venue of IFK Göteborg. This was the second cup final to be hosted at the venue and the first since 2015, notably the last time IFK Göteborg made an appearance in the cup final.

== Background ==
The Allsvenskan clubs IFK Göteborg and Malmö FF contested the final, with the winner earning a place in the second qualifying round of the 2020–21 UEFA Europa League. Malmö FF were already qualified for the first qualifying round of the 2020–21 UEFA Europa League through their position in the 2019 Allsvenskan.

IFK Göteborg played their first final since 2015 and their thirteenth in total. Malmö FF played their first final since 2018 and their 20th in total. IFK Göteborg won their seventh title in their previous final appearance while Malmö FF have lost in their last three final appearances. Having previously met in 1986, this was the second final to contest the two clubs. Malmö FF won the prior meeting in the final of the competition. Prior to the final, Malmö FF had won four straight league matches and found themselves in second place in the league table while IFK Göteborg had tied their last four games and were sitting in 11th place. The clubs also played each other in the league three days after the cup final, also at Gamla Ullevi, with Malmö FF winning 3–0.

== Route to the final ==
Note: In all results below, the score of the finalist is given first.(H: home, A: away)

IFK Göteborg		Round	Malmö FF	
Opponent	Result	Qualifying stage	Opponent	Result
Bye		Round 1	Bye	
BK Astrio	4–0 (A)	Round 2	IFK Värnamo	2–0 (A)
Opponent	Result	Group stage	Opponent	Result
Västerås SK	2–0 (H)	Matchday 1	Syrianska FC	8–0 (H)
Sollentuna FK	2–0 (A)	Matchday 2	FK Karlskrona	2–1 (A)
IK Sirius	1–1 (H)	Matchday 3	AFC Eskilstuna	3–0 (H)
**Group 7 winner**: Pos / Team / Pld / Pts; **1** / IFK Göteborg / **3** / **7**; 2 / Västerås SK / 3 / **6**; 3 / IK Sirius / 3 / **4**; 4 / Sollentuna FK / 3 / **0**; Source: Swedish Football Association		Final standings	**Group 2 winner**: Pos / Team / Pld / Pts; **1** / Malmö FF / **3** / **9**; 2 / AFC Eskilstuna / 3 / **4**; 3 / Syrianska FC / 3 / **3**; 4 / FK Karlskrona / 3 / **1**; Source: Swedish Football Association	
Opponent	Result	Knockout stage	Opponent	Result
Hammarby IF	3–1 (a.e.t.) (A)	Quarter-finals	AIK	4–1 (H)
IF Elfsborg	1–0 (a.e.t.) (A)	Semi-finals	Mjällby AIF	0–0 (4–2 p) (A)

== Match ==
=== Details ===
30 July 2020
17:45 UTC+2

IFK Göteborg	2–1 (a.e.t.)	Malmö FF
Karlsson Lagemyr 86'; Farnerud 94'	Report	Toivonen 40'

Gamla Ullevi, Gothenburg
Attendance: 0
Referee: Glenn Nyberg

**IFK Göteborg**	**Malmö FF**

GK	1	(Greece) Giannis Anestis	(yellow card) 120+1'
RB	5	(Sweden) Alexander Jallow
CB	15	(Sweden) Jakob Johansson
CB	30	(Sweden) Mattias Bjärsmyr
LB	20	(Sweden) Victor Wernersson
CM	19	(Sweden) August Erlingmark (c)		(substituted off) 68'
CM	28	(Nigeria) Alhassan Yusuf
RW	8	(Sweden) Hosam Aiesh
AM	89	(Sweden) Tobias Sana		(substituted off) 117'
LW	10	(Sweden) Patrik Karlsson Lagemyr		(substituted off) 106'
CF	16	(Sweden) Sargon Abraham		(substituted off) 82'
Substitutes:
GK	31	(Sweden) Tom Amos
DF	4	(Sweden) Kristopher Da Graca
DF	23	(Sweden) Emil Holm		(substituted on) 82'
DF	26	(Armenia) André Calisir		(substituted on) 106'
MF	3	(Sweden) Adil Titi	(yellow card) 120'	(substituted on) 117'
MF	11	(Sweden) Amin Affane
FW	17	(Sweden) Alexander Farnerud		(substituted on) 68'
Coach:
(Sweden) Poya Asbaghi

GK	27	(Sweden) Johan Dahlin
RB	2	(Sweden) Eric Larsson
CB	15	(Sweden) Anel Ahmedhodžić
CB	6	(Sweden) Oscar Lewicki		(substituted off) 23'
LB	3	(Denmark) Jonas Knudsen
CM	10	(Denmark) Anders Christiansen (c)
CM	20	(Nigeria) Bonke Innocent		(substituted off) 84'
RW	32	(Norway) Jo Inge Berget
AM	11	(Sweden) Ola Toivonen
LW	5	(Denmark) Søren Rieks		(substituted off) 13'
CF	7	(Sweden) Isaac Kiese Thelin
Substitutes:
GK	30	(Sweden) Marko Johansson
DF	4	(Sweden) Behrang Safari		(substituted on) 23'
MF	8	(Iceland) Arnór Ingvi Traustason
MF	19	(Sweden) Erdal Rakip	(yellow card) 106'	(substituted on) 84'
FW	9	(Sweden) Guillermo Molins		(substituted on) 106'
FW	23	(Sweden) Marcus Antonsson	(yellow card) 90'	(substituted on) 13' (substituted off) 106'
FW	39	(Sweden) Amin Sarr
Coach:
(Denmark) Jon Dahl Tomasson

Assistant referees:
Mahbod Beigi
Daniel Wärnmark
Fourth official:
Bojan Pandžić

**Match rules**

- 90 minutes.
- 30 minutes of extra time if necessary.
- Penalty shoot-out if scores still level.
- Seven named substitutes.
- Maximum of five substitutions.

=== Statistics ===
Overall	IFK Göteborg	Malmö FF
Goals scored	2	1
Total shots	6	12
Shots on target	4	5
Ball possession	52%	48%
Corner kicks	8	2
Fouls committed	17	23
Offsides	2	2
Yellow cards	2	2
Red cards	0	0

== See also ==
- 2019–20 Svenska Cupen
- IFK Göteborg–Malmö FF rivalry
