= Rasmus Wikström =

Swedish footballer (born 2001)

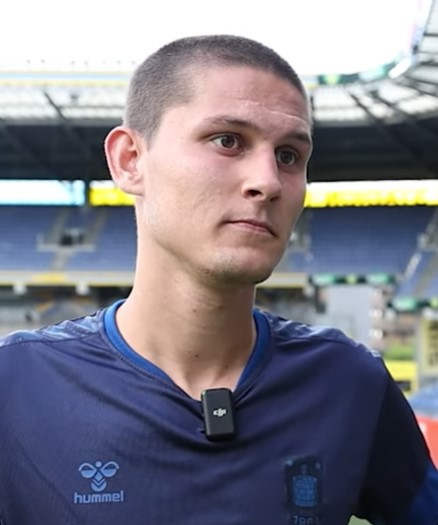
- Wikström in 2023

Personal information
- Full name: Rasmus Erik Wikström
- Date of birth: 18 March 2001 (age 25)
- Place of birth: Gothenburg, Sweden
- Height: 1.89 m (6 ft 2 in)
- Position: Centre-back

Team information
- Current team: IF Elfsborg
- Number: 6

Youth career
- –2013: Partille IF
- 2014–2018: IFK Göteborg

Senior career*
Years	Team	Apps	(Gls)
2019–2021	IFK Göteborg	3	(0)
2021	→ AFC Eskilstuna (loan)	11	(0)
2021–2023	Brøndby	1	(0)
2022–2023	→ SønderjyskE (loan)	28	(2)
2023–2024	Mjällby AIF	31	(1)
2025–	IF Elfsborg	35	(6)

International career
2017–2018	Sweden U17	22	(2)
2018	Sweden U19	2	(0)
- * Club domestic league appearances and goals as of 8 July 2026

Rasmus Erik Wikström (born 18 March 2001) is a Swedish professional footballer who plays as a centre-back for Allsvenskan club IF Elfsborg.

== Career ==
=== IFK Göteborg ===
Wikström started playing football for Partille IF, before joining the IFK Göteborg academy at age 13. Both his uncle Peter "Erra" Eriksson and his grandfather Per-Erik "Perra" Eriksson have previously played for the club.

Wikström made his senior debut for IFK Göteborg on 11 June 2018 in an 8–1 win over a selected team from Dalarna in a friendly match at Åvallen in Nyhammar. In December 2018, Wikström signed a three-year professional contract which saw him permanently promoted to the first team. He scored on his competitive debut on 17 February 2019, helping Blåvitt to a 2–0 win in Svenska Cupen against Nyköpings BIS.

He made his Allsvenskan debut several months later, on 13 July 2019, in a 1–1 draw against Falkenbergs FF, where he came on as a substitute in injury time for Victor Wernersson. In a match against Falkenbergs FF on 12 August 2019, Wikström made his debut from the start, but was forced off after only 4 minutes with a serious anterior cruciate ligament injury.

==== AFC Eskilstuna (loan) ====
In March 2021, Wikström signed a one-season loan deal with AFC Eskilstuna competing in Superettan. He made his debut as a starter for the club on 12 April in a 0–0 draw against Västerås SK. He finished his tenure with the club with 11 appearances.

=== Brøndby ===
On 29 July 2021, Wikström signed a four-year contract with defending Danish Superliga champions Brøndby, for an undisclosed fee. In September 2021, he suffered a shoulder injury, sidelining him for the rest of the year.

On 16 June 2022, it was confirmed that Wikström would spend the upcoming 2022–23 season on loan at newly relegated Danish 1st Division club SønderjyskE, to gain experience. He made 33 appearances for the club, scoring three goals. He returned to Brøndby at the end of his loan spell. However, he was deemed a surplus in the club's defence after pre-season.

=== Mjällby AIF ===
On 21 August 2023, Allsvenskan club Mjällby AIF announced they had reached a deal to sign Wikström on a contract until 2026. He made his debut for the club on 27 August, replacing Noah Eile in the 70th minute of a 3–0 home loss to Hammarby. On 18 September, he made his first start for Mjällby in a 2–0 away victory against IFK Norrköping.

=== IF Elfsborg ===
On 23 December 2024, it was announced that Wikström had signed for IF Elfsborg on a 5 year contract and would wear the number 6.

== Career statistics ==
As of match played 25 May 2024

Appearances and goals by club, season and competition
Club	Season	League			National cup (Note: Includes Svenska Cupen, Danish Cup)		Other		Total	
Club	Season	Division	Apps	Goals	Apps	Goals	Apps	Goals	Apps	Goals
IFK Göteborg	2019	Allsvenskan	2	0	1	1	—		3	1
IFK Göteborg	2020	Allsvenskan	1	0	0	0	—		1	0
IFK Göteborg	Total		3	0	1	1	—		4	1
AFC Eskilstuna (loan)	2021	Superettan	11	0	0	0	—		11	0
Brøndby	2021–22	Superliga	1	0	0	0	0	0	1	0
Sønderjyske (loan)	2022–23	1st Division	28	2	5	1	—		33	3
Mjällby AIF	2023	Allsvenskan	8	0	0	0	—		8	0
Mjällby AIF	2024	Allsvenskan	5	1	4	1	—		9	2
Mjällby AIF	Total		13	1	4	1	—		17	2
Career total			56	3	10	3	0	0	66	6

== Honours ==
IFK Göteborg

- Svenska Cupen: 2019–20
