= Vajebah Sakor =

Norwegian footballer (born 1996)

Personal information
- Full name: Vajebah Kaliefah Sakor
- Date of birth: 14 April 1996 (age 30)
- Place of birth: Monrovia, Liberia
- Height: 1.85 m (6 ft 1 in)
- Position: Midfielder

Senior career*
Years	Team	Apps	(Gls)
2011–2013	Asker	26	(2)
2012	→ Rosenborg (loan)	0	(0)
2013–2018	Juventus	0	(0)
2015–2016	→ Westerlo (loan)	0	(0)
2016	→ Vålerenga (loan)	20	(1)
2017	→ Willem II (loan)	1	(0)
2017	→ Göteborg (loan)	12	(2)
2018	Göteborg	23	(3)
2019–2021	OFI	45	(4)
2021	Brann	4	(1)
2022	Triestina	3	(0)
2023	Start	21	(3)
2024–2025	Sandnes Ulf	23	(1)
2025	Lamia	13	(0)
2025–2026	Montana	16	(0)

International career
2011–2013	Norway U17	21	(7)
2013–2015	Norway U19	10	(2)
2017–2019	Norway U21	3	(0)
- * Club domestic league appearances and goals as of 2 November 2026

Vajebah Kaliefah Sakor (born 14 April 1996) is a professional footballer who plays as a midfielder. Born in Liberia, he has represented Norway at youth level.

== Club career ==
Sakor made his debut for Asker at the age of 15, becoming the youngest player to play in the Norwegian First Division. After going on trial with Milan in March 2012, Sakor signed for Juventus in January 2013.

In August 2015, Sakor joined Westerlo on loan, before joining Vålerenga on loan in March 2016.

On 31 January 2017, Sakor was loaned to Willem II until the end of the season.

On 8 February 2022, Sakor signed with Triestina in Italian third-tier Serie C.

== International career ==
Sakor was born in Liberia, but moved to Norway at a young age. He has represented Norway in at the U15, U16, U17, U18, U19 and most recently at the U21 level.

== Career statistics ==
As of match played 8 NOvember 2020

Club	Season	Division	League		National Cup		Europe		Total	
Club	Season	Division	Apps	Goals	Apps	Goals	Apps	Goals	Apps	Goals
Vålerenga (loan)	2016	Tippeligaen	20	1	5	2	–		25	3
Willem II (loan)	2016–17	Eredivisie	1	0	0	0	–		1	0
IFK Göteborg (loan)	2017	Allsvenskan	12	2	0	0	–		12	2
IFK Göteborg	2018	Allsvenskan	23	3	2	0	–		25	3
IFK Göteborg	Total		35	5	2	0	–		37	5
OFI	2018–19	Super League Greece	8	1	0	0	–		8	1
OFI	2019–20	Super League Greece	19	2	2	0	–		21	2
OFI	2020–21	Super League Greece	6	0	0	0	–		6	0
OFI	Total		33	3	2	0	–		35	3
Career total			89	9	9	2	0	0	98	11
