= Robin Söder =

Swedish footballer

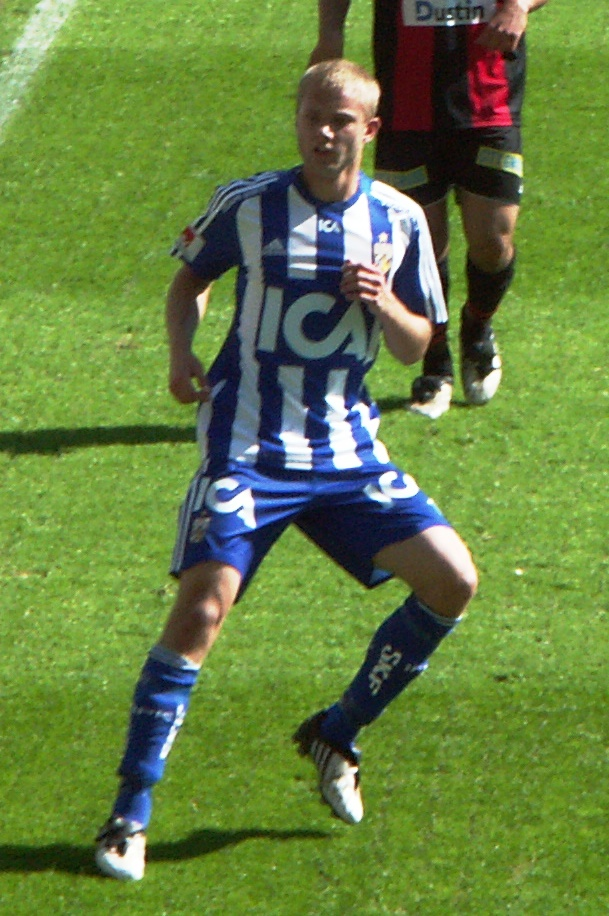
- Söder with IFK Göteborg in 2009

Personal information
- Full name: Robin Mikael Söder
- Date of birth: 1 April 1991 (age 35)
- Place of birth: Magra, Sweden
- Height: 1.77 m (5 ft 10 in)
- Position: Forward

Youth career
- 1995–1998: Magra IS
- 1998–2002: Sollebrunns AIK
- 2002–2005: Morlanda GoIF
- 2008: IFK Göteborg

Senior career*
Years	Team	Apps	(Gls)
2005–2006	Morlanda GoIF		
2006–2007	Stenungsunds IF		
2008–2014	IFK Göteborg	125	(23)
2014–2017	Esbjerg fB	61	(18)
2017–2018	Lokeren	35	(7)
2018–2021	IFK Göteborg	61	(18)
Total		282	(66)

International career
2006–2008	Sweden U17	19	(9)
2008–2009	Sweden U21	5	(1)
2020	Sweden	1	(0)
- * Club domestic league appearances and goals

Robin Mikael Söder (born 1 April 1991) is a Swedish former professional footballer who played as a forward. He spent the majority of his professional career at IFK Göteborg, but also represented Esbjerg fB in Denmark and Lokeren in Belgium. He won one cap for the Sweden national team in 2020.

== Club career ==
=== Early career ===
Söder began his football career 1995 in Magra IS. After a couple of years, he started to play for Sollebrunn AIK. He moved out from Magra at the age of 12 and started to play for Morlanda GoIF in Orust. He changed club to Stenungsunds IF, where he also played senior football.

=== IFK Göteborg ===
Söder was signed for the youth team of the Swedish champions IFK Göteborg in December 2007, but soon began to train and play with the senior squad.

He made his debut in Allsvenskan on 1 July 2008 when he came on as a substitute against Trelleborgs FF. Only eleven days later, he made his first Allsvenskan goal for the club, securing three points against Djurgårdens IF by scoring 2–1 in the 91st minute.

After his debut season he was awarded Newcomer of the Year at the annual Fotbollsgalan, beating Sebastian Rajalakso, Rasmus Jönsson and Joel Ekstrand.

=== Esbjerg fB ===
After six seasons in IFK Göteborg, Söder decided to move to Danish side Esbjerg fB on 22 August 2014. He signed a three-year contract. After scoring 9 goals in 11 matches during the 2016–17 season, he was mentioned as a potential player for the national team by national team manager Janne Andersson.

=== Lokeren ===
On 22 May 2017, Söder joined Belgian First Division A club Lokeren on a free transfer. He signed a three-year contract.

=== Return to IFK Göteborg and retirement ===
On 10 August 2018, Söder returned to his old club IFK Göteborg, signing a three-and-a-half-year contract. On 24 February 2019, he was voted as 2018 Årets ärkeängel (Archangel of the Year), an award given to a player who is considered to have shown great loyalty to the club.

In the 2019 season, Söder became the top scorer of the club with 14 goals in Allsvenskan, one goal less than top scorer Mohamed Buya Turay. For his performances during 2019, he was awarded Kristallkulan (The Crystal Ball), given to the best player in West Sweden. Following the departure of Lasse Vibe, Söder was chosen as club-captain at the start of the 2020 season. When Marcus Berg returned to the club in July 2021, he took over the captaincy from Söder. Söder was instead picked as vice-captain.

On 26 November 2021, it was announced that Söder would leave IFK Göteborg after the season, when his contract expired. He played his last game for the club two days later against Östersunds FK. On 11 January 2022, he officially retired from professional football and began working as a scout for IFK Göteborg.

== International career ==
=== Youth ===
Söder was a regular in the Swedish national youth teams, and he was the captain of the Swedish U17 team in 2 matches in 2007. He became the youngest person ever to play in the Swedish U21 team, being 17 years and 157 days old when he played against Poland on 5 September 2008. The record was previously held by Leif Eriksson, who was 17 years and 212 days when he made his debut in 1959.

On 23 May 2009, he was selected for the Swedish squad competing in the 2009 UEFA European Under-21 Championship. Söder played one game in this tournament, coming as a substitute in the semi-final against England. He assisted Marcus Berg to the 3–3 equaliser. In the overtime that followed, he suffered a serious ligament injury.

=== Senior ===
After his successful 2019 season, Söder was called up to the national team by Janne Andersson for the friendly games against Moldova and Kosovo in January 2020. He made his senior debut for Sweden against Kosovo on 12 January 2020, a game in which he was captain.

== Career statistics ==
=== Club ===
Appearances and goals by club, season and competition
Club	Season	League			Cup (Note: Includes appearances in the Svenska Cupen, Danish Cup and Belgian Cup.)		International (Note: Includes appearances in the UEFA Champions League and UEFA Europa League.)		Other (Note: Includes appearances in the Svenska Supercupen, Danish Superliga relegation play-off and Belgian First Division A Europa League play-off knockout stage.)		Total	
Club	Season	Division	Apps	Goals	Apps	Goals	Apps	Goals	Apps	Goals	Apps	Goals
IFK Göteborg	2008	Allsvenskan	14	5	5	0	4	2	0	0	23	7
IFK Göteborg	2009	Allsvenskan	12	2	0	0	0	0	1	0	13	2
IFK Göteborg	2010	Allsvenskan	13	3	2	0	2	0	0	0	17	3
IFK Göteborg	2011	Allsvenskan	18	0	3	1	—		—		21	1
IFK Göteborg	2012	Allsvenskan	23	2	1	1	—		—		24	3
IFK Göteborg	2013	Allsvenskan	26	9	2	0	2	0	1	0	31	9
IFK Göteborg	2014	Allsvenskan	19	2	5	6	5	0	—		29	8
IFK Göteborg	Total		125	23	18	8	13	2	2	0	158	33
Esbjerg fB	2014–15	Danish Superliga	21	4	4	0	—		—		25	4
Esbjerg fB	2015–16	Danish Superliga	12	4	1	2	—		—		13	6
Esbjerg fB	2016–17	Danish Superliga	28	10	2	1	—		4	1	34	12
Esbjerg fB	Total		61	18	7	3	0	0	4	1	72	22
Lokeren	2017–18	Belgian First Division A	35	7	1	1	—		1	0	37	8
Lokeren	2018–19	Belgian First Division A	0	0	—		—		—		0	0
Lokeren	Total		35	7	1	1	0	0	1	0	37	8
IFK Göteborg	2018	Allsvenskan	9	2	1	0	—		—		10	2
IFK Göteborg	2019	Allsvenskan	27	14	1	0	—		—		28	14
IFK Göteborg	2020	Allsvenskan	9	0	3	3	0	0	—		12	3
IFK Göteborg	2021	Allsvenskan	16	2	4	3	—		—		20	5
IFK Göteborg	Total		61	18	9	6	0	0	0	0	70	24
Career total			282	66	35	18	13	2	7	1	337	87

=== International ===
Appearances and goals by national team and year
National team	Year	Apps	Goals
Sweden	2020	1	0
Total		1	0

== Honours ==
Stenungsunds IF

- Division 4 Bohuslän/Dalsland: 2006

IFK Göteborg

- Svenska Cupen: 2008, 2012–13, 2019–20

Individual

- Swedish Newcomer of the Year: 2008
- Årets ärkeängel (IFK Göteborg player who have shown great loyalty to the club): 2018
- Kristallkulan (best player in West Sweden): 2019
