= Sebastian Ohlsson (footballer, born 1993) =

Swedish footballer

Personal information
- Full name: Carl-Robert Sebastian Ohlsson
- Date of birth: 26 May 1993 (age 33)
- Place of birth: Gothenburg, Sweden
- Height: 1.81 m (5 ft 11 in)
- Positions: Right-back; midfielder

Team information
- Current team: Degerfors IF
- Number: 16

Youth career
- –2003: Qviding FIF
- 2003–2012: IFK Göteborg

Senior career*
Years	Team	Apps	(Gls)
2013	IFK Göteborg	0	(0)
2013	→ Örgryte IS (loan)	26	(1)
2014–2016	Örgryte IS	73	(30)
2017–2019	IFK Göteborg	48	(4)
2019–2022	FC St. Pauli	54	(0)
2023–2024	IFK Göteborg	41	(5)
2025–	Degerfors IF	38	(3)
- * Club domestic league appearances and goals as of 8 July 2026

Sebastian Ohlsson (born 26 May 1993) is a Swedish professional footballer who plays as a right-back and midfielder for Degerfors IF.

== Career statistics ==
=== Club ===
As of match played 21 August 2021

Appearances and goals by club, season and competition
Club	Season	League			National cup (Note: Includes Svenska Cupen, DFB-Pokal)		Other		Total	
Club	Season	Division	Apps	Goals	Apps	Goals	Apps	Goals	Apps	Goals
Örgryte (loan)	2013	Superettan	26	1	5	0	—		31	1
Örgryte	2014	Ettan	23	4	3	1	2 (Note: Appearances in Superettan relegation play-offs)	0	28	5
Örgryte	2015	Ettan	22	16	0	0	2	0	24	16
Örgryte	2016	Superettan	28	10	1	0	—		29	10
Örgryte	Total		73	30	4	1	4	0	81	31
IFK Göteborg	2017	Allsvenskan	6	0	6	2	—		12	2
IFK Göteborg	2018	Allsvenskan	26	3	4	2	—		30	5
IFK Göteborg	2019	Allsvenskan	16	1	1	0	—		17	1
IFK Göteborg	Total		48	4	11	4	—		59	8
FC St. Pauli	2019–20	2. Bundesliga	24	0	1	0	—		25	0
FC St. Pauli	2020–21	2. Bundesliga	23	0	1	0	—		24	0
FC St. Pauli	Total		47	0	2	0	—		49	0
Career total			194	35	22	5	4	0	220	40
