= Måns Saebbö =

Swedish footballer

Personal information
- Full name: Måns Tobias Viking Saebbö
- Date of birth: 21 August 2000 (age 26)
- Place of birth: Sweden
- Height: 1.88 m (6 ft 2 in)
- Position: Forward

Team information
- Current team: FC Trollhättan
- Number: 10

Youth career
- –2012: Kungsladugårds BK
- 2013–2019: IFK Göteborg

Senior career*
Years	Team	Apps	(Gls)
2017–2019	IFK Göteborg	1	(1)
2019	GAIS	9	(1)
2020–	FC Trollhättan	6	(0)

International career
2016–2017	Sweden U17	7	(2)
2017–2018	Sweden U19	4	(0)
- * Club domestic league appearances and goals as of 12 July 2020

Måns Saebbö (born 21 August 2000) is a Swedish footballer who plays for FC Trollhättan as a forward.
