= August Erlingmark =

Swedish footballer

Personal information
- Full name: Jan August Erlingmark
- Date of birth: 22 April 1998 (age 28)
- Place of birth: Gothenburg, Sweden
- Height: 1.89 m (6 ft 2 1/2 in)
- Positions: Centre-back; defensive midfielder

Team information
- Current team: IFK Göteborg
- Number: 3

Youth career
- 2004–2014: Sävedalens IF
- 2015–2016: IFK Göteborg

Senior career*
Years	Team	Apps	(Gls)
2017–2021	IFK Göteborg	117	(8)
2022–2024	Atromitos	61	(4)
2024–	IFK Göteborg	60	(1)

International career
2016–2018	Sweden U19	6	(0)
2019–2020	Sweden U21	6	(1)
2020	Sweden	1	(0)
- * Club domestic league appearances and goals as of 19:21, 2 September 2026 (UTC)

Jan August Erlingmark (born 22 April 1998) is a Swedish professional footballer who plays as a centre-back and defensive midfielder for Allsvenskan club IFK Göteborg, which he captains.

== Club career ==
On 12 January 2022, Erlingmark joined Atromitos on a free transfer.

On 17 October 2022, he extended his contract until the summer of 2024.

On 9 July 2024, after his contract with Atromitos expired, he returned to IFK Göteborg on a free transfer.

== International career ==
Erlingmark made his debut for the Sweden national team in a friendly game against Kosovo on 12 January 2020.

== Personal life ==
He is the son of former IFK Göteborg captain and national team player Magnus Erlingmark.

== Career statistics ==
As of 9 July 2024

Club	Season	League			Cup		Continental		Total	
Club	Season	Division	Apps	Goals	Apps	Goals	Apps	Goals	Apps	Goals
IFK Göteborg	2017	Allsvenskan	19	3	2	0	—		21	3
IFK Göteborg	2018	Allsvenskan	21	1	5	0	—		26	1
IFK Göteborg	2019	Allsvenskan	27	0	0	0	—		27	0
IFK Göteborg	2020	Allsvenskan	25	3	6	1	1	0	32	4
IFK Göteborg	2021	Allsvenskan	25	1	4	0	—		29	1
IFK Göteborg	Total		117	8	17	1	1	0	135	9
Atromitos	2021–22	Super League Greece	16	2	—		—		16	2
Atromitos	2022–23	Super League Greece	24	2	2	0	—		26	2
Atromitos	2023–24	Super League Greece	21	0	3	0	—		24	0
Atromitos	Total		61	4	5	0	0	0	66	4
IFK Göteborg	2024	Allsvenskan	0	0	0	0	—		0	0
IFK Göteborg	Total		0	0	0	0	0	0	0	0
Career total			178	12	22	1	1	0	201	13

== Honours ==
IFK Göteborg

- Svenska Cupen: 2019–20
