= Alexander Farnerud =

Swedish professional footballer (born 1984)

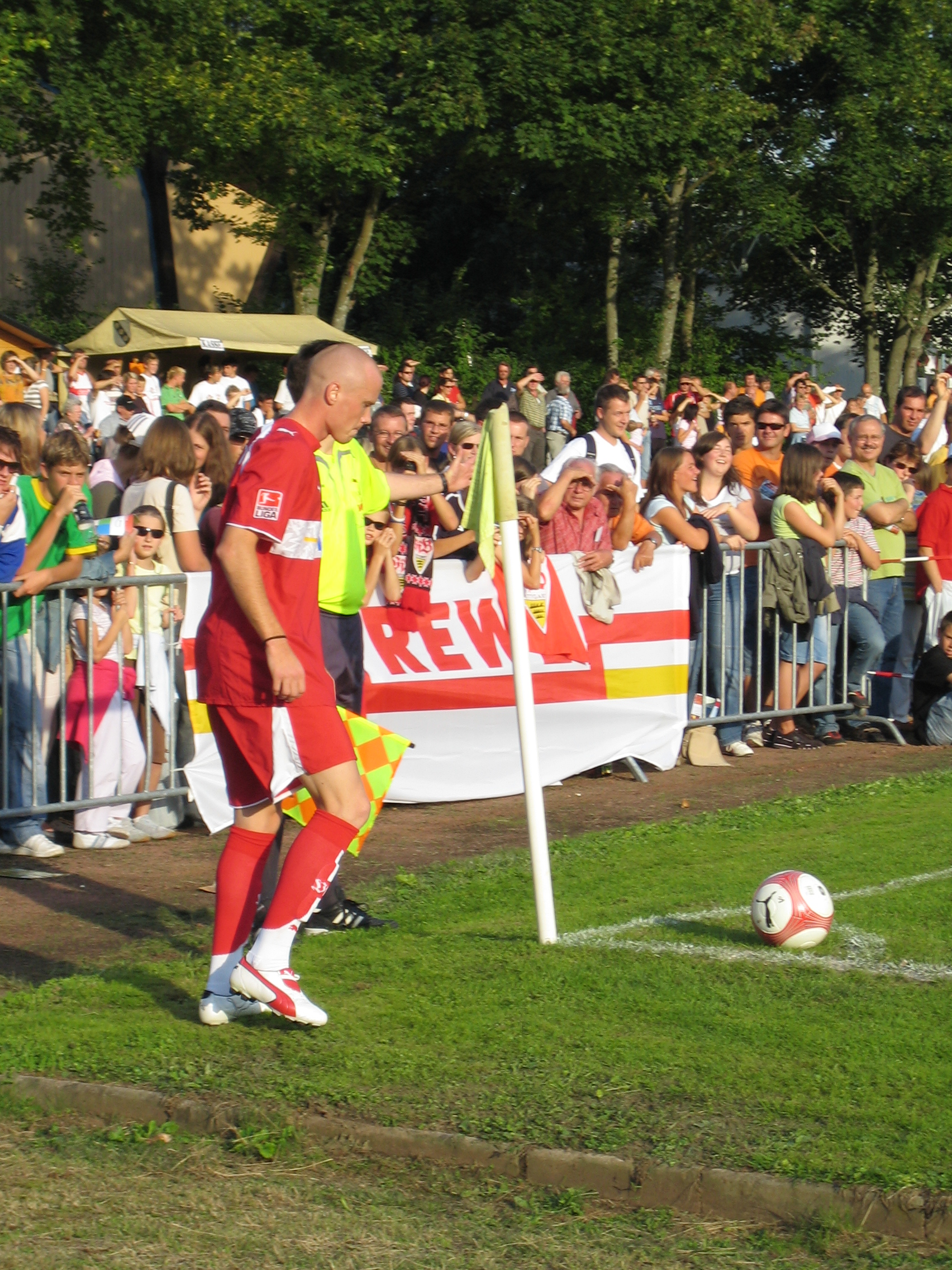
- Farnerud in a friendly game with VfB Stuttgart

Personal information
- Full name: Alexander Hans Christian Farnerud
- Date of birth: 1 May 1984 (age 42)
- Place of birth: Landskrona, Sweden
- Height: 1.81 m (5 ft 11 in)
- Position: Attacking midfielder

Youth career
- 1997–2001: Landskrona BoIS

Senior career*
Years	Team	Apps	(Gls)
2001–2003	Landskrona BoIS	75	(13)
2004–2006	Strasbourg	81	(6)
2006–2008	VfB Stuttgart	20	(0)
2006–2008	→ VfB Stuttgart II	4	(1)
2008–2011	Brøndby IF	73	(18)
2011–2013	Young Boys	82	(16)
2013–2016	Torino	50	(5)
2016–2017	BK Häcken	24	(5)
2019	Helsingborgs IF	19	(2)
2020	IFK Göteborg	21	(4)
2021–2022	FC Chiasso	14	(1)
Total		463	(71)

International career
1999–2001	Sweden U16	21	(9)
2001–2002	Sweden U19	6	(3)
2002–2006	Sweden U21	36	(12)
2003–2010	Sweden	8	(2)
- * Club domestic league appearances and goals as of 6 January 2022

Alexander Hans Christian Farnerud (born 1 May 1984) is a Swedish former professional footballer who played as attacking midfielder. Starting out at Landskrona BoIS in the early 2000s, he went on to represent clubs in France, Germany, Denmark, Switzerland, and Italy before retiring at FC Chiasso in 2022. A full international between 2003 and 2010, he won eight caps and scored two goals for the Sweden national team.

== Club career ==
=== Landskrona BoIS ===
Born in Landskrona, Farnerud made his professional debut with Landskrona BoIS. He scored in one of his first Allsvenskan matches, a 2–1 home win against reigning champions Hammarby.

=== Strasbourg ===
On 15 November 2003, Farnerud was bought by France's Strasbourg, being an automatic first-choice in his two-and-a-half-year spell. In his first and third seasons in Ligue 1, he played alongside older brother Pontus who was first loaned by Monaco, then acquired.

=== Stuttgart ===
Upon Strasbourg's 2006 relegation, Farnerud moved to VfB Stuttgart in Germany, on a four-year deal. He was used sporadically over the course of two Bundesliga campaigns, appearing nine times for the 2007 champions.

=== Brøndby IF ===
On 8 July 2008, Farnerud signed with the Danish Superliga club Brøndby.

=== Young Boys ===
On 18 January 2011, Farnerud changed clubs and countries again, joining Young Boys from Switzerland for an undisclosed fee until 2014. He made his Super League debut on 13 February in the 4–2 victory over Zürich, and on 16 April he also netted twice for the hosts against Bellinzona (4–0).

=== Torino ===
On 18 June 2013, Farnerud was signed by Italian side Torino for €1.8 million on a three-year contract. He made his official debut on 17 August, in a Coppa Italia tie against Pescara which ended in a 1–2 loss. On 20 October he scored his first goal in Serie A, opening the scoreline in an eventual 3–3 home draw to Inter Milan.

After a difficult start to the season, in which he was often benched, Farnerud became a regular and consistent performer for Toro, netting again in the 14th round against Genoa and two days later against Udinese.

=== BK Häcken ===
On 9 August 2016, Farnerud returned to his native country, signing a long-term deal with BK Häcken and re-joining his childhood friend Rasmus Lindgren at his new club. He played 11 matches and scored three goals in his debut campaign, and went to provide eight assists during his spell before attracting a serious knee injury in a fixture against IK Sirius on 22 July 2017; due to his recurrent physical ailments, he chose to leave by mutual consent in November.

=== Helsingborg ===
In October 2018, Farnerud joined Helsingborgs IF ahead of the upcoming season. In January 2020, following his release, he trialled with 3. Liga team SG Sonnenhof Großaspach.

=== IFK Göteborg ===
On 14 May 2020, Farnerud signed with IFK Göteborg. He scored the winning goal in the 2020 Svenska Cupen final when Göteborg beat Malmö FF 2–1 in overtime.

=== FC Chiasso and retirement ===
In July 2021, Farnerud signed with Swiss Promotion League side FC Chiasso on a one-year contract. He announced his retirement from professional football in June 2022, having played 14 games and scored 1 goal for the club.

== International career ==
=== Youth ===
After appearing for all the Sweden national youth teams, Farnerud became a permanent fixture in the under-21s, with whom he participated in the 2004 UEFA European Championship.

=== Senior ===
He won his first cap for the Sweden national team on 16 February 2003 at age 18, in a King's Cup fixture against Qatar; four days later, in the same competition, he scored his first goal to help to a 2–0 defeat of Thailand.

On 21 March 2015, after more than five years of absence, Farnerud was called by manager Erik Hamrén for a Euro 2016 qualifier against Moldova and a friendly with Iran.

He won a total of eight caps and scored two goals during his time with the national team.

== Personal life ==
Farnerud's older brother, Pontus, also played professional football. He too was a midfielder and a Swedish international before retiring in 2013.

== Career statistics ==
=== International ===
Appearances and goals by national team and year
National team	Year	Apps	Goals
Sweden	2003	3	1
Sweden	2004	0	0
Sweden	2005	1	0
Sweden	2006	0	0
Sweden	2007	0	0
Sweden	2008	0	0
Sweden	2009	2	1
Sweden	2010	2	0
Total		8	2

International goals

#	Date	Venue	Opponent	Score	Result	Competition	Ref.
1.	20 February 2003	National Stadium, Bangkok, Thailand	Thailand	3–0	4–1	2003 King's Cup	
2.	28 January 2009	Oakland Coliseum, Oakland, United States	Mexico	1–0	1–0	Friendly	

== Honours ==
Stuttgart

- Bundesliga: 2006–07

Strasbourg

- Coupe de la Ligue: 2004–05

IFK Göteborg

- Svenska Cupen: 2019–20

Sweden

- King's Cup: 2003
