= Adil Titi =

Togolese footballer

Personal information
- Date of birth: 20 August 1999 (age 27)
- Place of birth: Gothenburg, Sweden
- Height: 1.85 m (6 ft 1 in)
- Position: Midfielder

Team information
- Current team: Utsiktens BK
- Number: 7

Youth career
- 2004–2012: Rannebergens IF
- 2013–2014: Gunnilse IS
- 2015–2017: IFK Göteborg

Senior career*
Years	Team	Apps	(Gls)
2017–2021	IFK Göteborg	14	(0)
2020	→ Norrby IF (loan)	9	(0)
2021	→ IK Brage (loan)	24	(0)
2022–2025	IK Brage	37	(4)
2025	AC Trento	1	(0)
2025–	Utsiktens BK	11	(0)

International career^{‡}
2017–2019	Sweden U19	13	(3)
2024–	Togo	1	(0)
- * Club domestic league appearances and goals as of 16 November 2025 ‡ National team caps and goals as of 10 September 2024

Adil Titi (born 20 August 1999) is a footballer who plays as a midfielder for Swedish Superettan club Utsiktens BK. Born in Sweden, he represents the Togo national team.

== International career ==
Born in Sweden, Titi is of Togolese descent. He is a former youth international for Sweden, having played for the Sweden U19. He was called up to the Togo national team in March 2024. TIti made his debut for the Togo national team on 9 September 2024 in a Africa Cup of Nations qualifier against Equatorial Guinea at Estadio de Malabo.
