= Isak Magnusson =

Swedish footballer

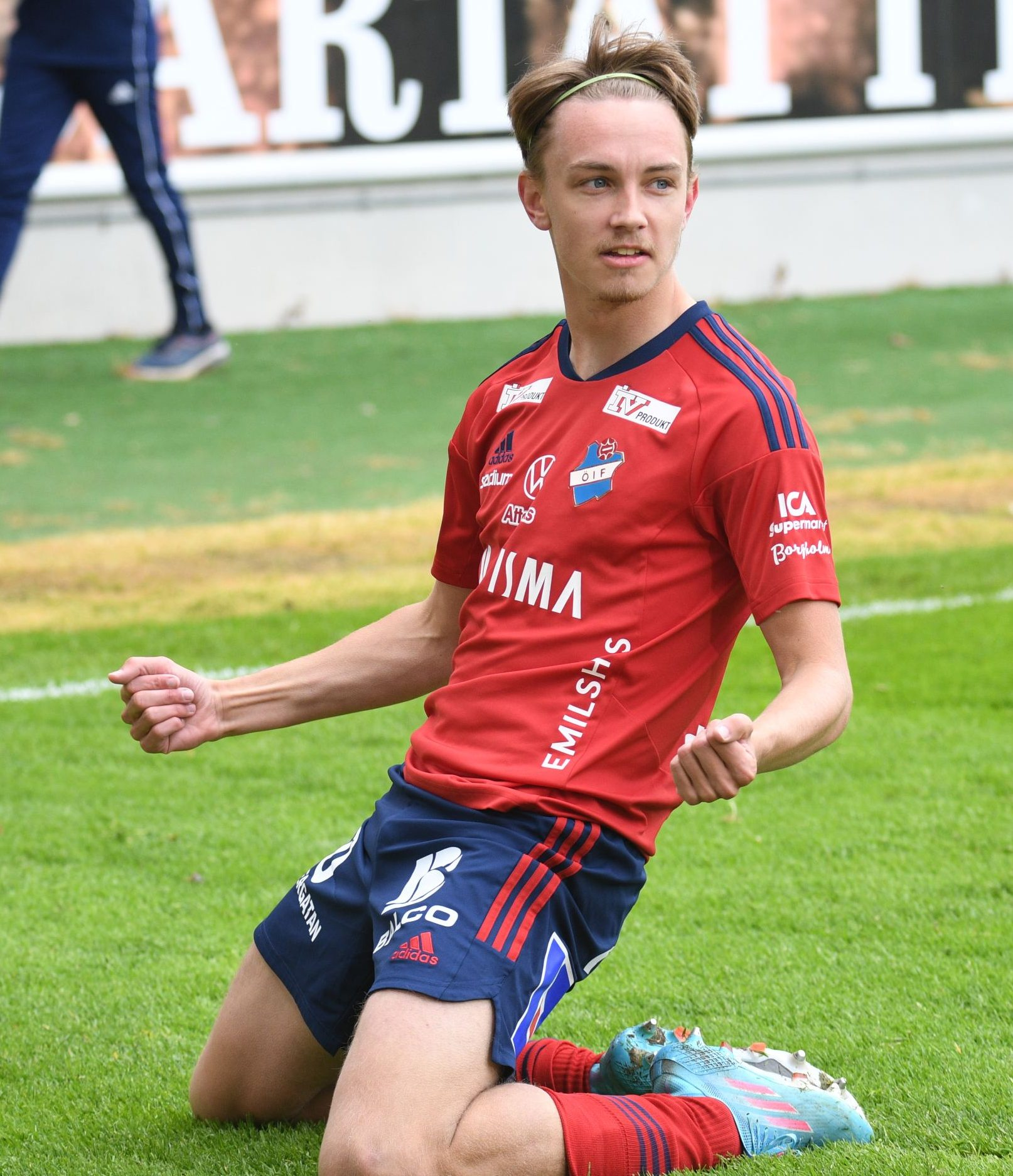

Personal information
- Full name: Isak Arne Edvard Magnusson
- Date of birth: 16 June 1998 (age 28)
- Place of birth: Sweden
- Height: 1.79 m (5 ft 10 in)
- Position: Midfielder

Team information
- Current team: FC Rosengård 1917
- Number: 39

Youth career
- Lindås BK

Senior career*
Years	Team	Apps	(Gls)
2017–2021	Kalmar FF	77	(7)
2021–2023	Östers IF	58	(4)
2024–	FC Rosengård 1917	53	(4)

International career^{‡}
2020	Sweden U20	2	(0)
- * Club domestic league appearances and goals as of 24 November 2025 ‡ National team caps and goals as of 22 April 2024

Isak Magnusson (born 16 June 1998) is a Swedish footballer who plays for FC Rosengård 1917.

He played twice for Sweden U20.
