= Nyhammar =

- Location within Dalarna Location within Sweden
- Coordinates: 60°17′N 14°58′E
- Country: Sweden
- Province: Dalarna
- County: Dalarna County
- Municipality: Ludvika Municipality

Area
  - Total: 1.76 km^{2} (0.68 sq mi)

Population (31 December 2010)
  - Total: 654
  - Density: 372/km^{2} (960/sq mi)
- Time zone: UTC+1 (CET)
  - Summer (DST): UTC+2 (CEST)

Nyhammar is a locality situated in Ludvika Municipality, Dalarna County, Sweden with 654 inhabitants in 2010.
