= Poya Asbaghi =

Swedish football manager (born 1985)

Personal information
- Date of birth: 17 July 1985 (age 41)
- Place of birth: Karaj, Iran

Managerial career
- Years: Team
- 2016–2017: Dalkurd FF
- 2017: Gefle IF
- 2018–2020: IFK Göteborg
- 2021: Sweden U21
- 2021–2022: Barnsley
- 2023–2024: Al-Shamal
- 2024: Al-Rayyan
- 2025: Al-Wakrah

Poya Asbaghi (Persian: پویا اسبقی; [puːjɒː æsbæɣiː]; born 17 July 1985) is a Swedish professional football manager who was most recently the head coach of Qatar Stars League side Al-Wakrah.

== Early life ==
Asbaghi has stated that his family fled from Iran when he was one year old because of political persecution and for being advocates of freedom and opponents of the Islamic regime. He grew up in Uppsala where his parents lived as of June 2020.

== Managerial career ==
=== Dalkurd FF ===
During Asbaghi's time as assistant manager of Swedish side Dalkurd FF, he and his team narrowly avoided embarking on Germanwings Flight 9525 in their scheduled return trip from Barcelona.

=== IFK Göteborg ===
Asbaghi was appointed as manager of Swedish Allsvenskan side IFK Göteborg before the start of the 2018 Allsvenskan season. On 25 July 2019, IFK extended his contract until 2022. After the 2019 season, Poya Asbaghi was nominated as the manager of the year in Allsvenskan. He was subsequently offered the manager role at English Championship side Barnsley which he turned down.

Asbaghi led Göteborg to the 2019–20 Swedish Cup final after a win over IF Elfsborg on 9 July 2020. On 30 July 2020, Asbaghi and Göteborg won the 2020 Swedish Cup Final after a 2–1 extra time win over Malmö FF, qualifying the team to the 2020–21 UEFA Europa League qualifying rounds.

Asbaghi was relieved of his duties on 3 September 2020 during the 2020 season.

=== Sweden U21 ===
On 24 November 2020, Asbaghi was appointed as manager of the Sweden U21 national team, with his contract running until summer 2023. He left in November 2021 to join Barnsley as their new head coach.

=== Barnsley ===
In November 2021, Asbaghi was appointed head coach of bottom side Championship club Barnsley after the sacking of former head coach Markus Schopp who had lost seven games in a row. Ferran Sibila became Asbaghi's assistant. Following relegation to League One for the 2022–23 season, Asbaghi left Barnsley by mutual agreement.

=== Red Star Belgrade ===
In September 2022, Asbaghi became assistant manager of Red Star Belgrade alongside manager Miloš Milojević. In April 2023, Asbaghi and Milojević became champions of the 2022–23 Serbian SuperLiga. In May 2023, Asbaghi and Red Star won the Serbian Cup during Red Star's 2022–23 season.

== Managerial record ==
As of 24 April 2022

Managerial record by team and tenure

Team	From	To	Record					Ref
Team	From	To	M	W	D	L	Win %	Ref
Dalkurd FF	1 January 2016	14 May 2017	41	20	15	6	48.78	
Gefle IF	29 May 2017	31 December 2017	21	10	4	7	47.62	
IFK Göteborg	1 January 2018	3 September 2020	78	24	24	30	30.77	
Sweden U21	24 November 2020	17 November 2021	7	5	2	0	71.43	
Barnsley	21 November 2021	24 April 2022	27	4	8	15	14.81	
Total			174	63	53	58	36.21	—

== Honours ==
IFK Göteborg

- Svenska Cupen: 2019–20

Red Star Belgrade

- Serbian SuperLiga: 2022–23
- Serbian Cup: 2022–23
