= Kaspar Sjöberg =

Swedish football referee (born 1987)

- Born: 16 May 1987 (age 39); Sweden

Domestic
Years	League	Role
2013–2015, 2023-	Superettan	Referee
2015–2023	Allsvenskan	Referee

International
Years	League	Role
2019–2023	FIFA listed	Referee

Kaspar Sjöberg (born 16 May 1987) is a Swedish football referee and former handball referee. He became an Allsvenskan referee in 2015 and a full international referee for FIFA in 2019. Sjöberg has refereed 171 matches in Allsvenskan, 66 matches in Superettan and 24 international matches as of June 2024. As of 2024 he is no longer a FIFA referee and as of June 2024 he has only refereed matches in Superettan, the second tier division, during the 2024 season.

== See also ==
- List of football referees
