= André Calisir =

Armenian footballer (born 1990)

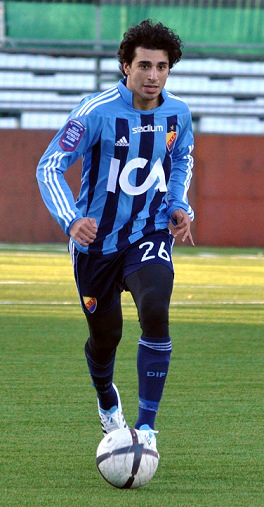

Personal information
- Full name: André Jack Calisir
- Date of birth: 13 June 1990 (age 36)
- Place of birth: Stockholm, Sweden
- Height: 1.80 m (5 ft 11 in)
- Position: Centre-back

Youth career
- Djurgårdens IF

Senior career*
Years	Team	Apps	(Gls)
2007–2011	Djurgårdens IF	7	(0)
2009	→ Skellefteå FF (loan)	21	(0)
2011	→ Jönköpings Södra IF (loan)	17	(0)
2012–2017	Jönköpings Södra IF	168	(5)
2018–2020	IFK Göteborg	67	(2)
2021	Apollon Smyrnis	8	(0)
2021–2023	Silkeborg IF	21	(0)
2023–2025	IF Brommapojkarna	38	(0)
Total		347	(7)

International career
2010	Sweden U19	2	(0)
2018–2024	Armenia	34	(0)
- * Club domestic league appearances and goals

André Jack Calisir (Armenian: Անդրե Ջեկ Կալիսիր; born 13 June 1990) is a former professional footballer who played as a centre-back. Born in Sweden, he represented the Armenia national team.

== Club career ==
Calisir began playing football in Djurgården's youth organization. He made his Allsvenskan debut on 9 May 2010, away against Örebro SK. Calisir's contract with Djurgården expired in December 2011 and was not extended. He joined second division side Jönköping with whom he won the Superettan in 2015 and secured promotion to the first division.

Calisir joined IFK Göteborg in 2018 following Jönköping's relegation from the Allsvenskan. He came on as an extra-time substitute in IFK's defeat of Malmö FF in the 2020 Svenska Cupen Final on 30 July 2020.

== International career ==
As a Swedish citizen of Armenian and Assyrian descent, Calisir was eligible to play for the Sweden or Armenia national team in international football. He played for the Swedish youth teams, but opted to accept the call-up to the Armenia in May 2018.

He debuted with the Armenia national team in a friendly 0–0 draw to Moldova on 4 June 2018.

== Personal life ==
Calisir was born in Sweden and is of Armenian and Assyrian descent. His father is an Assyrian born in Turkey, and his mother, who is of Armenian descent, made him eligible to represent the Armenia national team.

== Career statistics ==
As of match played 17 November 2024

Appearances and goals by national team and year
National team	Year	Apps	Goals
Armenia	2018	3	0
Armenia	2019	5	0
Armenia	2020	5	0
Armenia	2021	8	0
Armenia	2022	2	0
Armenia	2023	5	0
Armenia	2024	6	0
Total		34	0

== Honours ==
Jönköping

- Superettan: 2015

IFK Göteborg

- Svenska Cupen: 2019–20
