= Andreas Ekberg =

Swedish football referee

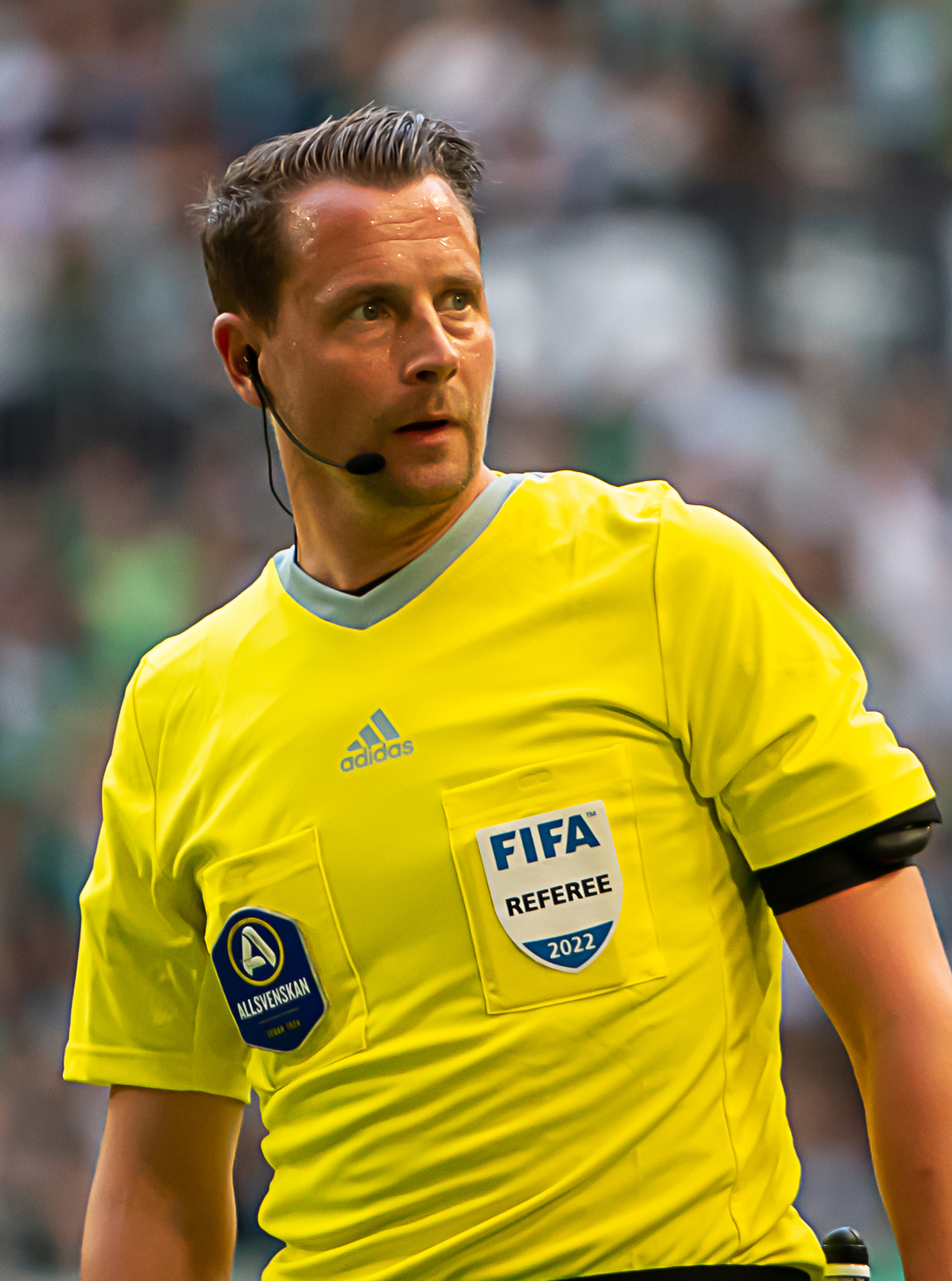
- Ekberg refereeing an Allsvenskan game between Hammarby IF and IFK Göteborg in 2022
- Full name: Lars Christian Andreas Ekberg
- Born: 2 January 1985 (age 41); Malmö, Sweden
- Other occupation: Police officer

Domestic
Years	League	Role
2007–	Superettan	Referee
2009–	Allsvenskan	Referee

International
Years	League	Role
2013–	FIFA listed	Referee

Lars Christian Andreas Ekberg (born 2 January 1985) is a Swedish football referee. Ekberg currently resides in Malmö. He has been a full-time international referee for FIFA since 2013. He became a professional referee in 2004 and has been an Allsvenskan referee since 2009. Ekberg has refereed 185 matches in Allsvenskan, 56 matches in Superettan and 72 international matches as of 2021. Ekberg began refereeing matches in Torns IF when he was 13 years old.

== See also ==
- List of football referees
