= Prioritet Serneke Arena =

Multi-sports venue in Gothenburg, Sweden

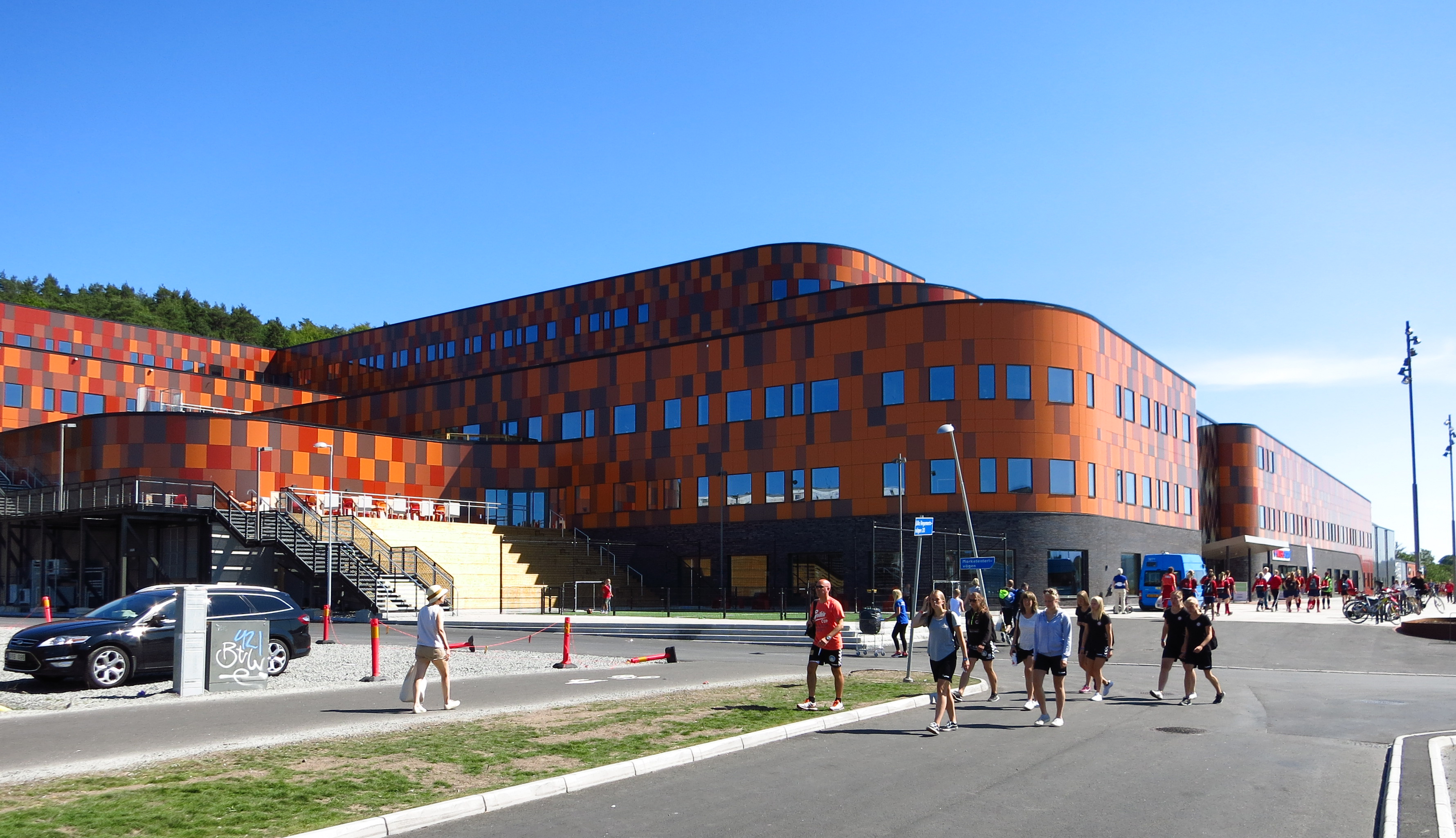
- The exterior of Prioritet Serneke Arena
- Interactive map of Prioritet Serneke Arena
- Former names: Göteborgs Nya Arena (2014–2015); Änglagården (–2014)
- Location: Gothenburg, Sweden
- Coordinates: 57.738318°N 12.035002°E
- Owner: Prioritet Finans and Serneke
- Operator: Prioritet Finans and Serneke
- Capacity: 3,300 (football)
- Type: Multi-sport complex
- Acreage: 45,300 m²

Construction
- Groundbreaking: 1 August 2012
- Built: 2012–2015
- Opened: 10 July 2015
- Cost: SEK 800 million
- Architect: OkiDoki! Arkitekter
- General contractor: Serneke

Tenants
- IFK Göteborg Academy 2015– IFK Göteborg (women) 2020-2021

Website
- www.prioritetsernekearena.se

Prioritet Serneke Arena is a multi-sport complex in the district of Kviberg in Gothenburg, Sweden.

The arena, located in Kviberg Park in eastern Gothenburg, is the largest multi-sport complex in the Nordic countries. It has a total area of 45,300 m² spread out on seven floors, and houses amongst other things a 1.2 km long indoor all-season skiing trail and a full-size football pitch with a spectator capacity of 3,300. There are also two sports other halls (for handball, etc.), a restaurant, a hotel, conference areas, a fitness centre, and a sports injury clinic. The complex is also used by the elementary school Änglagårdsskolan connected to IFK Göteborg, the sports gymnasium Aspero Idrottsgymnasium and the football academy of IFK Göteborg.

The plans to build Prioritet Serneke Arena were conceived in the mid-2000s by the contracting company Serneke, the head of the IFK Göteborg Academy Roger Gustafsson and the "Änglagårdsskolan". The first names of the project were "Änglagården" (an informal nickname of the Academy) and later "Göteborgs Nya Arena". The first plans were to build an indoor arena and school premises with a total area of 23,000 m². In 2010, discussions with other parties started and a skiing trail, fitness centre, hotel, restaurant, and conference areas were added to the plans. The project broke ground on 1 August 2012 and after three years of construction, the facilities were opened to the public on 10 July 2015. The current name was unveiled in connection to the opening.

It is owned and operated by Serneke and the financial institution Prioritet Finans. The complex was designed by architects Fredrik Hansson and Rickard Stark from OkiDoki! Arkitekter and the building cost was SEK 800 million.
