= Kristoffer Karlsson =

Swedish football referee (born 1984)

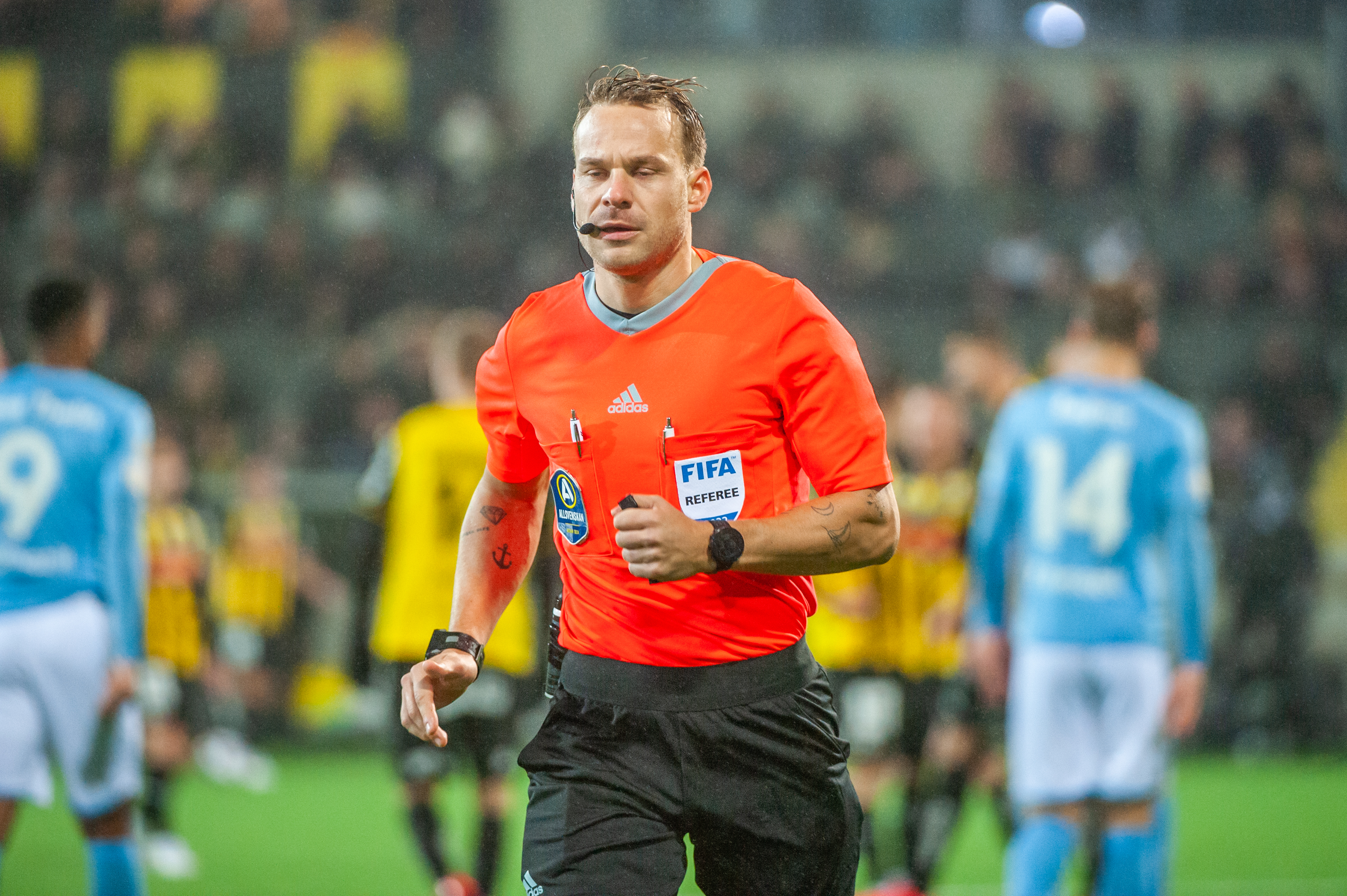
- Born: 1984 (age 41–42); Sweden

Domestic
Years	League	Role
2011–	Superettan	Referee
2012–	Allsvenskan	Referee

International
Years	League	Role
2018–	FIFA listed	Referee

Kristoffer Karlsson (born 1984) is a Swedish football referee. He became a professional referee in 2006, has been an Allsvenskan referee since 2012 and a full international referee for FIFA since 2018. Karlsson has refereed 146 matches in Allsvenskan, 57 matches in Superettan and 26 international matches as of 2019.

== See also ==
- List of football referees
