= Mats Engström =

Swedish businessman

21st Chairman of IFK Göteborg
- In office 5 March 2018 – 15 March 2021
- Preceded by: Frank Andersson
- Succeeded by: Richard Berkling

Personal details
- Born: Mats Engström; 7 October 1955 Höganäs, Sweden
- Profession: Businessman

Mats Engström (born 7 October 1955) is a Swedish businessman and former chairman of Swedish football club IFK Göteborg. He was elected chairman on 5 March 2018 by the general meeting. Engström was the vice-chairman before that, and had been part of the board since 2015. Engström ended his tenure as chairman for the club after the annual general meeting held on 15 March 2021.

He has also been chairman for football club Västra Frölunda IF, and was regional manager for Nordea, where he worked for 36 years before retiring in 2019 to focus more on IFK Göteborg as well as other board memberships. In his early years, he played for Höganäs BK in the lower divisions of Swedish football.

== Honours won by club during presidency ==
- Svenska Cupen:
  - Winners (1): 2019–20
