= Amin Affane =

Swedish footballer (born 1994)

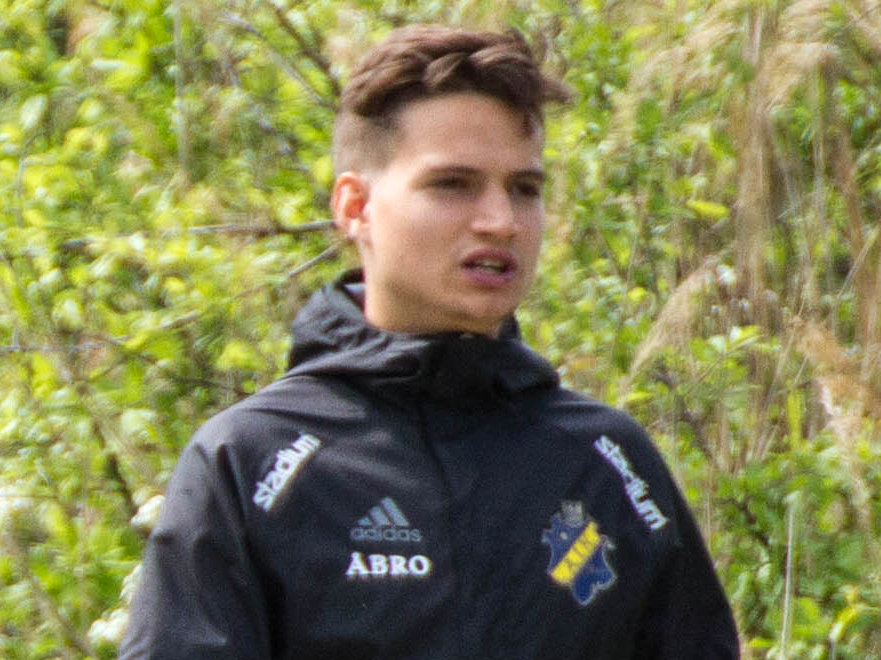

Personal information
- Full name: Amin Tareq Affane
- Date of birth: 21 January 1994 (age 32)
- Place of birth: Gothenburg, Sweden
- Height: 1.74 m (5 ft 9 in)
- Position: Midfielder

Youth career
- –2010: Lärje-Angereds IF
- 2010–2012: Chelsea

Senior career*
Years	Team	Apps	(Gls)
2012–2013	Chelsea	0	(0)
2012–2013	→ Roda JC (loan)	15	(1)
2013–2014	Energie Cottbus	9	(2)
2014	→ Energie Cottbus II	7	(6)
2014–2015	VfL Wolfsburg II	22	(12)
2015	Arminia Bielefeld	8	(0)
2015	→ Arminia Bielefeld II	1	(0)
2016–2017	AIK	34	(1)
2018–2020	IFK Göteborg	33	(1)
2019	→ Örgryte IS (loan)	11	(1)
Total		140	(24)

International career
2009–2011	Sweden U17	14	(1)
2011–2012	Sweden U19	6	(0)
2017	Sweden U21	1	(0)
- * Club domestic league appearances and goals

Amin Tareq Affane (Arabic: أمين طارق عفان, IPA: [ʔaˈmiːn ˈtˤaːrɪq ʕaˈfːaːn]; Swedish: [aˈmɪnː aˈfanː]; born 21 January 1994) is a Swedish former professional footballer who played as a midfielder.

== Club career ==
=== Lärje-Angereds IF ===
Affane, who was playing for the Division 3 team Lärje-Angereds IF, agreed to join Chelsea in January 2010, leaving Lärje-Angereds IF to head to London ahead of interest from some of Europe's biggest teams including AC Milan, Juventus, Real Madrid, Manchester United, and Manchester City.

=== Chelsea ===
He missed much of his first year in England due to injury, but pressed on towards the end of the season and put a run of games together in the Under-18s. He made his reserve debut in April 2011.

==== Loan to Roda JC ====
On 30 August 2012, Affane signed a season-long loan deal with the Dutch side Roda JC.

On 1 September 2012, Affane made his debut for the club against Willem II where he came on as a substitute in the second half and provided the assist for Krisztián Németh's goal and also won the Man of the match. Roda JC went on to win the match 3–0 and this was their first league win in the 2012–13 season. He started his first game for Roda in their next fixture on 16 September 2012 away to AZ Alkmaar, where the game ended in a 4–0 loss. On 25 September 2012, Affane made his KNVB Cup debut for Roda, where they lost 1–0 at home to PEC Zwolle in the extra time. On 30 September 2012, he scored his first goal for Roda in an Eredivisie match where they lost 3–2 to Groningen. He came in as a substitute in the 71st minute and awarded the team with a hard shot from 22 meters and scored the equalizer from a pass by Abel Tamata, 2–2 in the 78th minute. On 20 October 2012, Amin again came in to play as a substitute in the second half of the match where they were drawn 1–1 to FC Twente and assisted the only goal by them, which was scored by Guus Hupperts, while Affane's low cross was missed by Twente goalkeeper Nikolay Mihaylov. On 11 November 2012, Affane set up their two goals which were scored by Senharib Malki and Bart Biemans, both from corners in a 5–2 away loss against Feyenoord at De Kuip. Amin Affane returned to Chelsea after seeing the loan spell at Eredivisie side Roda JC cut short. He initially saw plenty of first-team football at Roda, but fell out of favour in February and has subsequently been deemed surplus to requirements.

=== Energie Cottbus ===
On 27 May 2013 it was announced that Affane had signed a three-year contract with Energie Cottbus. After Cottbus were relegated from the 2. Bundesliga at the end of the 2013–14 season, he signed for VfL Wolfsburg II.

=== AIK ===
On 5 January 2016, Affane signed a three-year contract with Swedish club AIK.

=== IFK Göteborg ===
Affane finished up his career at IFK Göteborg before deciding to retire from professional football at the age of 26.

== International career ==
Affane represented Sweden at the U17, U19, and U21 levels. He was also eligible to play for Morocco. He was of the Sweden U21 squad at the 2017 UEFA European Under-21 Championship in Poland.

== Career statistics ==
=== Club ===
As of 1 September 2024

Club Performance		League			Cup		Other		Continental		Total	
Club	Season	Division	Apps	Goals	Apps	Goals	Apps	Goals	Apps	Goals	Apps	Goals
Netherlands		Division	League		KNVB Cup		Other^{1}		UEFA		Total	
Roda JC (loan)	2012–13	Eredivisie	15	1	1	0	0	0	0	0	16	1
Germany		Division	League		DFB-Pokal		Other		UEFA		Total	
Energie Cottbus	2013–14	2. Bundesliga	9	2	0	0	–		–		9	2
VfL Wolfsburg II	2014–15	Regionalliga	22	12	–		–		–		22	12
Arminia Bielefeld	2015–16	2. Bundesliga	8	0	0	0	–		–		8	0
Sweden		Division	League		Svenska Cupen		Other		UEFA		Total	
AIK	2016	Allsvenskan	19	0	7	1	–		5	1	31	2
AIK	2017	Allsvenskan	15	1	1	0	–		0	0	16	1
AIK	Total		34	0	8	1	0	0	5	1	46	3
IFK Göteborg	2018	Allsvenskan	20	1	8	0	–		–		28	1
IFK Göteborg	2019	Allsvenskan	8	0	1	0	–		–		9	0
IFK Göteborg	2020	Allsvenskan	5	0	1	0	–		–		6	0
IFK Göteborg	Total		33	1	10	0	0	0	0	0	48	2
Örgryte IS (loan)	2019	Superettan	11	1	–		–		–		11	1
Career total			132	18	19	1	0	0	5	1	151	20

^{1}Includes other competitive competitions, including the Johan Cruijff Shield.

== Honours ==
Chelsea Youth

- FA Youth Cup: 2011–12

IFK Göteborg

- Svenska Cupen: 2019–20
