= Patrik Karlsson Lagemyr =

Swedish footballer

Personal information
- Full name: Patrik Daniel; Karlsson Lagemyr
- Date of birth: 18 December 1996 (age 29)
- Place of birth: Gothenburg, Sweden
- Height: 1.67 m (5 ft 6 in)
- Position: Attacking midfielder

Youth career
- –2006: BK Häcken
- 2007–2015: IFK Göteborg

Senior career*
Years	Team	Apps	(Gls)
2015–2022	IFK Göteborg	74	(13)
2022–2023	IK Sirius	17	(1)
Total		91	(14)

International career
2015	Sweden U19	1	(0)
- * Club domestic league appearances and goals

Patrik Daniel Karlsson Lagemyr (born 18 December 1996) is a Swedish former professional footballer who played as an attacking midfielder. During his career, he represented IFK Göteborg and IK Sirius in Allsvenskan.

== Honours ==
IFK Göteborg

- Svenska Cupen: 2019–20
