= Sargon Abraham =

Swedish footballer of Assyrian descent

Personal information
- Date of birth: 7 February 1991 (age 35)
- Place of birth: Skövde, Sweden
- Height: 1.78 m (5 ft 10 in)
- Position: Forward

Team information
- Current team: IFK Skövde

Youth career
- –2009: Skövde AIK

Senior career*
Years	Team	Apps	(Gls)
2009–2010	Skövde AIK	3	(0)
2009	→ Tibro AIK (loan)	13	(2)
2011–2013	IFK Skövde	60	(35)
2014–2016	Skövde AIK	75	(42)
2017–2018	Degerfors IF	47	(23)
2018–2020	IFK Göteborg	58	(5)
2021	Degerfors IF	18	(0)
2022–2023	Örgryte IS	23	(4)
2024–2025	Skövde AIK	52	(11)
2026–	IFK Skövde	0	(0)

International career
2012–2016	Sweden (futsal)	46	(23)
- * Club domestic league appearances and goals as of 24 November 2025

Sargon Abraham (Syriac: ܣܐܪܓܧܢ ܐܒܪܐܗܐܡ; born 7 February 1991) is a Swedish professional footballer who plays for IFK Skövde as a forward.

== Club career ==
He won the 2019–20 Svenska Cupen, to be his first title with IFK Göteborg. After the 2021 season, Abraham left the club.

In December 2021, Abraham was recruited by Örgryte IS, where he signed a three-year contract.

In January 2024, Abraham was recruited by Skövde AIK.

== Personal life ==
Abraham was born in Sweden to Syrian Assyrian parents. His brother Elmar is also a professional footballer and is a member of the Syria national team.

== Honours ==
IFK Göteborg

- Svenska Cupen: 2019–20
