= Kristopher da Graça =

Cape Verdean footballer (born 1998)

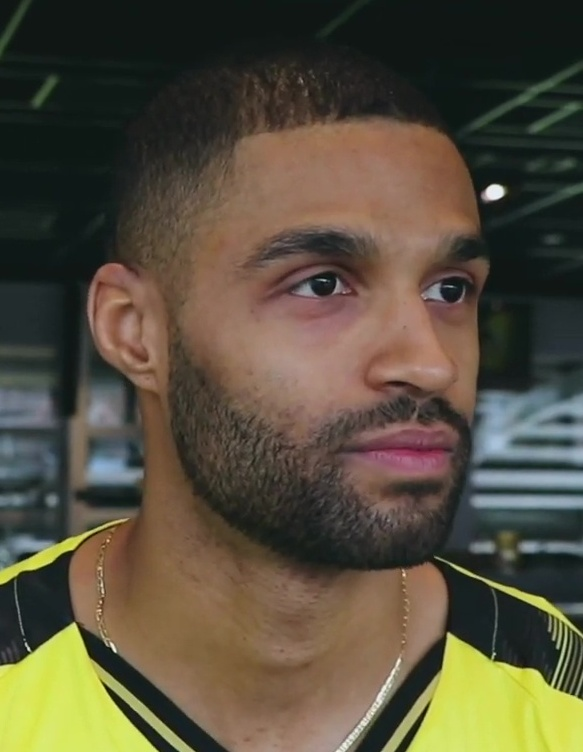

Personal information
- Full name: Kristopher Santos da Graça
- Date of birth: 16 January 1998 (age 28)
- Place of birth: Gothenburg, Sweden
- Height: 1.90 m (6 ft 3 in)
- Position: Centre back

Team information
- Current team: Krasava ENY Ypsonas FC
- Number: 4

Youth career
- –2013: Hisingsbacka FC
- 2013–2017: Arsenal

Senior career*
| Years | Team | Apps | (Gls) |
| 2017–2020 | IFK Göteborg | 51 | (0) |
| 2021–2022 | VVV-Venlo | 35 | (0) |
| 2022–25 | Sirius | 30 | (0) |
| 2023 | → HJK (loan) | 5 | (0) |
| 2024 | → KuPS (loan) | 11 | (0) |
| 2025 | → Schaffhausen (loan) | 15 | (0) |
| 2025- | Krasava ENY Ypsonas FC | 15 | (0) |

International career^{‡}
| 2013–2014 | Sweden U17 | 4 | (1) |
| 2015–2016 | Sweden U19 | 3 | (0) |
| 2020 | Sweden | 1 | (0) |
| 2023–2025 | Cape Verde | 3 | (0) |
- * Club domestic league appearances and goals as of 14 June 2026 ‡ National team caps and goals as of 7 June 2025

Kristopher Santos da Graça (Swedish: [ˈkɾi.stɔ.fəɾ] Portuguese: [ˈsɐ̃.tuʒ dɐ ˈɡɾa.sɐ]; born 16 January 1998) is a footballer who plays as a centre back for Sirius. Born in Sweden, he played for the Cape Verde national team.

== Club career ==
On 6 January 2021, da Graça was transferred from Swedish side IFK Göteborg to Dutch club VVV-Venlo.

On 29 January 2022, da Graça returned to Sweden and signed with IK Sirius.

On 27 July 2023, da Graça was loaned out to Finnish club HJK Helsinki for the rest of the 2023 season with a purchase option. After the season, he returned to Sirius. On 1 March 2024, Da Graca was loaned out to Kuopion Palloseura (KuPS) in Veikkausliiga for the 2024 season, with a purchase option.

== International career ==
Da Graça was born in Sweden to parents from Cape Verde. He was a youth international for Sweden. In January 2020, he was selected for the Swedish national a-team's international training matches in Doha, Qatar against Moldova and Kosovo by head coach, Janne Andersson. He is still eligible to represent Cape Verde due to his heritage.

He made his international debut for the Sweden national team on 12 January 2020 in a friendly game against Kosovo.

On 4 October 2023, da Graça got a call-up to Cape Verde national team for friendly matches against Algeria and Comoros, on 12 and 17 October 2023, respectively. On 17 October, he debuted with the Cape Verdean national side and was included in the starting lineup in a friendly match against Comoros hosted at Stade Parsemain in Fos-sur-Mer, France. His side lost the match 2–1.

== Career statistics ==
As of 28 April 2025

Appearances and goals by club, season and competition
| Club | Season | League | | | Cup (Note: Includes Svenska Cupen, KNVB Beker and Suomen Cup) | | League cup (Note: Includes Finnish League Cup) | | Europe | | Total | |
| Club | Season | Division | Apps | Goals | Apps | Goals | Apps | Goals | Apps | Goals | Apps | Goals |
|---|---|---|---|---|---|---|---|---|---|---|---|---|
| IFK Göteborg | 2017 | Allsvenskan | 7 | 0 | 1 | 0 | – | | – | | 8 | 0 |
| IFK Göteborg | 2018 | Allsvenskan | 4 | 0 | 0 | 0 | – | | – | | 4 | 0 |
| IFK Göteborg | 2019 | Allsvenskan | 22 | 0 | 2 | 0 | – | | – | | 24 | 0 |
| IFK Göteborg | 2020 | Allsvenskan | 18 | 0 | 0 | 0 | – | | 0 | 0 | 18 | 0 |
| IFK Göteborg | Total | | 51 | 0 | 3 | 0 | 0 | 0 | 0 | 0 | 54 | 0 |
| VVV-Venlo | 2020–21 | Eredivisie | 20 | 0 | 2 | 0 | – | | – | | 22 | 0 |
| VVV-Venlo | 2021–22 | Eerste Divisie | 15 | 0 | 1 | 0 | – | | – | | 16 | 0 |
| VVV-Venlo | Total | | 35 | 0 | 3 | 0 | 0 | 0 | 0 | 0 | 38 | 0 |
| Sirius | 2022 | Allsvenskan | 22 | 0 | 1 | 0 | – | | – | | 23 | 0 |
| Sirius | 2023 | Allsvenskan | 8 | 0 | 2 | 0 | – | | – | | 10 | 0 |
| Sirius | Total | | 30 | 0 | 3 | 0 | 0 | 0 | 0 | 0 | 33 | 0 |
| HJK Helsinki (loan) | 2023 | Veikkausliiga | 5 | 0 | 0 | 0 | 0 | 0 | 4 (Note: Appearances in UEFA Europa League and UEFA Conference League) | 0 | 9 | 0 |
| KuPS (loan) | 2024 | Veikkausliiga | 11 | 0 | 4 | 0 | 2 | 0 | 1 (Note: Appearance(s) in UEFA Conference League) | 0 | 18 | 0 |
| KuPS Akatemia (loan) | 2024 | Ykkönen | 1 | 0 | – | | – | | – | | 1 | 0 |
| Schaffhausen (loan) | 2024–25 | Swiss Challenge League | 12 | 0 | 0 | 0 | – | | – | | 12 | 0 |
| Career total | | | 145 | 0 | 13 | 0 | 2 | 0 | 5 | 0 | 165 | 0 |

=== International ===
As of match played 7 June 2025

Appearances and goals by national team and year
| National team | Year | Apps | Goals |
|---|---|---|---|
| Sweden | 2020 | 1 | 0 |
| Sweden | Total | 1 | 0 |
| Cape Verde | 2023 | 1 | 0 |
| Cape Verde | 2025 | 2 | 0 |
| Cape Verde | Total | 3 | 0 |
| Career total | | 4 | 0 |

== Honours ==
HJK

- Veikkausliiga: 2023

KuPS

- Veikkausliiga: 2024
- Finnish Cup: 2024
- Finnish League Cup runner-up: 2024
