= Tom Amos =

Swedish footballer

Personal information
- Full name: Tom Shiran Amos
- Date of birth: 6 February 1998 (age 28)
- Place of birth: Gothenburg, Sweden
- Height: 1.96 m (6 ft 5 in)
- Position: Goalkeeper

Team information
- Current team: NSÍ Runavík
- Number: 13

Youth career
- –2006: Mossens BK
- 2007–2017: IFK Göteborg

Senior career*
Years	Team	Apps	(Gls)
2018–2021	IFK Göteborg	4	(0)
2021	→ Utsiktens BK	30	(0)
2022–2023	J-Södra	8	(0)
2023	Hapoel Be'er Sheva	0	(0)
2024	Ljungskile SK	23	(0)
2025–2026	Utsiktens BK	17	(0)
2026–	NSÍ Runavík	22	(0)
- * Club domestic league appearances and goals as of 17:25, 1 November 2026 (UTC)

Tom Shiran Amos (born 6 February 1998) is a Swedish professional footballer who plays as a goalkeeper for Faroe Islands Premier League club NSÍ Runavík.

== Honours ==
NSÍ Runavík

- Faroe Islands Premier League: 2026
