= Bojan Pandžić =

Swedish football referee (born 1982)

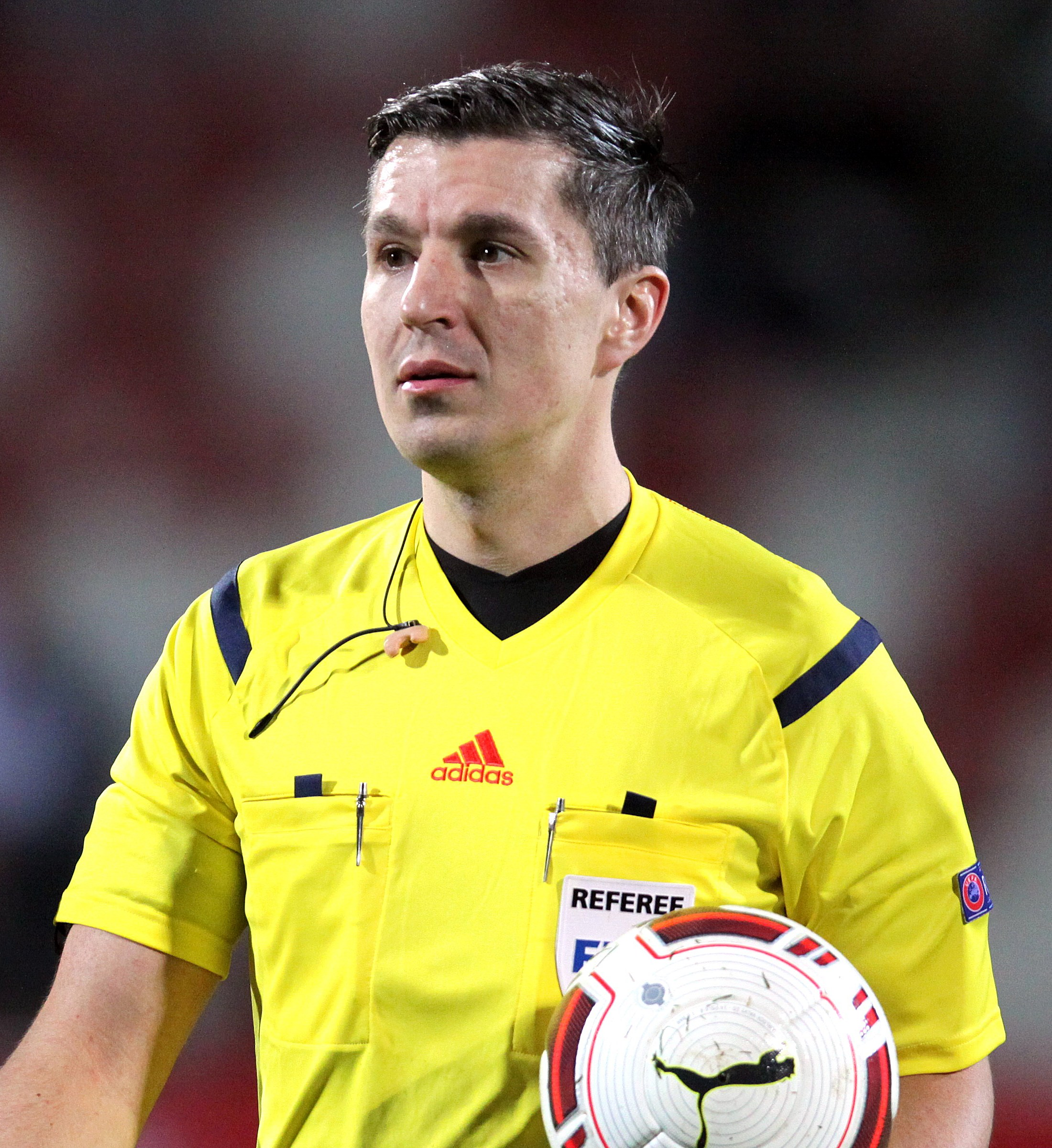
- Full name: Bojan Pandžić
- Born: 13 March 1982 (age 44); Sweden
- Other occupation: Salesman

Domestic
Years	League	Role
2008–2023	Superettan	Referee
2009–2023	Allsvenskan	Referee

International
Years	League	Role
2014–2023	FIFA listed	Referee

Bojan Pandžić (born 13 March 1982) is a Swedish former football referee. Pandžić currently resides in Hisings Backa, part of Gothenburg. He was a full international referee for FIFA between 2014 and 2023 when he quit refereeing. He became a professional referee in 2004 and became an Allsvenskan referee in 2009. Pandzic has refereed 165 matches in Allsvenskan, 65 matches in Superettan and 8 international matches as of 2014.

== See also ==
- List of football referees
