= Victor Wernersson =

Swedish footballer

Personal information
- Full name: Victor Christoffer Wernersson
- Date of birth: 6 July 1995 (age 31)
- Place of birth: Malmö, Sweden
- Height: 1.80 m (5 ft 11 in)
- Position: Left-back

Team information
- Current team: Västerås SK
- Number: 21

Youth career
- –2014: Malmö FF

Senior career*
Years	Team	Apps	(Gls)
2015–2017	Syrianska FC	62	(0)
2017	Vejle BK	13	(0)
2018–2020	IFK Göteborg	77	(2)
2020–2023	Mechelen	8	(0)
2021–2022	→ Stabæk (loan)	41	(1)
2023–2024	NAC Breda	28	(2)
2024–	Västerås SK	43	(0)
- * Club domestic league appearances and goals as of 8 July 2026

Victor Wernersson (born 6 July 1995) is a Swedish professional footballer who plays as a left-back for Superettan club Västerås SK.

== Career ==
On 1 September 2020, Wernersson joined Mechelen in Belgium. On 5 August 2021, Wernersson was loaned to Norwegian club Stabæk until the end of 2021. On 3 March 2022, the loan was extended for the 2022 season.

In January 2023, Wernersson joined Eerste Divisie club NAC Breda on an eighteen-month contract following a trial period with the club.

On 25 July 2024, Wernersson joined Västerås SK.
