= 2016 IFK Göteborg season =

IFK Göteborg
2016 season
- Chairman: Frank Andersson
- Head coach: Jörgen Lennartsson
- Stadium: Gamla Ullevi
- Allsvenskan: 4th
- 2015–16 Svenska Cupen: Group stage
- 2016–17 UEFA Europa League: Play-off round
- Top goalscorer: League: Tobias Hysén (10); All: Tobias Hysén (14)
- Highest home attendance: 15,748 vs. Malmö FF (27 April 2016, Allsvenskan)
- Lowest home attendance: 1,815 vs. Halmstads BK (6 March 2016, Svenska Cupen); Allsvenskan: 8,144 vs. Gefle IF (17 October 2016)
- Average home league attendance: 11,786
Home colours	Away colours

The 2016 season was IFK Göteborg's 111th in existence, their 84th season in Allsvenskan and their 40th consecutive season in the league. They competed in Allsvenskan, Svenska Cupen where they were knocked out in the group stage and in qualification for the UEFA Europa League where they were knocked out in the play-off round. League play started on 3 April and ended on 6 November.

== Key events ==
- 30 August 2015: Defender Benjamin Zalo joins the club on a three-year contract, transferring from FK Ørn-Horten.
- 1 November 2015: Goalkeeper Johan Hagman leaves the club.
- 2 November 2015: Goalkeeper John Alvbåge signs a new three-year contract, keeping him at the club until the end of the 2018 season.
- 6 November 2015: Goalkeeper Erik Dahlin joins the club on a two-year contract, transferring from IK Oddevold.
- 11 November 2015: Forward Riku Riski leaves the club and returns to Rosenborg BK as his loan contract expires.
- 11 November 2015: Goalkeeper Marcus Sandberg leaves the club, transferring to Vålerenga.
- 12 November 2015: Midfielder Karl Bohm leaves the club. On 1 February 2016, he joined Utsiktens BK.
- 1 December 2015: Defender Patrick Dyrestam leaves the club on loan to Ängelholms FF for the duration of the season.
- 3 December 2015: Italian Kappa is announced to be the club's new kit manufacturer for four years.
- 4 December 2015: Club director Martin Kurzwelly is being sacked.
- 5 December 2015: Forward Patrik Karlsson Lagemyr is promoted to the first-team squad, signing a two-year contract to keep him at the club until the end of the 2017 season.
- 7 December 2015: Defender Hjálmar Jónsson signs a new one-year contract, keeping him at the club until the end of the season.
- 22 December 2015: Defender Billy Nordström signs a new one-year contract, keeping him at the club until the end of the season.
- 14 January 2016: Midfielder Gustav Svensson leaves the club, transferring to Guangzhou R&F.
- 26 January 2016: Forward Tobias Hysén joins the club on a two-year contract, transferring Shanghai SIPG
- 8 February 2016: Chairman Karl Jartun announces his resignation from the club.
- 13 February 2016: Forward Malick Mané leaves the club. On 26 February, he joined Taraz.
- 16 February 2016: Defender Hjörtur Hermannsson joins the club on a loan deal until 22 July 2016, transferring from PSV.
- 20 February 2016: Goalkeeper John Alvbåge is selected as 2015 Archangel of the Year, an annual price given by the Supporterklubben Änglarna to a player who has shown a great loyalty to IFK Göteborg.
- 7 March 2016: Frank Andersson is selected as new chairman at the annual meeting.
- 30 March 2016: Goalkeeper Oliver Gustafsson joins the club on a three-month contract, transferring from GAIS.
- 31 March 2016: Director of sports Mats Gren is announced as new caretaker club director.
- 31 March 2016: Defender Mauricio Albornoz joins the club on a loan deal until 30 June 2016, transferring from Åtvidabergs FF.
- 5 July 2016: Goalkeeper Oliver Gustafsson signs a new one-month contract, keeping him at the club until 31 July 2016.
- 5 July 2016: Defender Mauricio Albornoz leaves the club and returns to Åtvidabergs FF as his loan contract expires.
- 7 July 2016: Defender Hjörtur Hermannsson leaves the club and returns to PSV as he transfers to Brøndby IF.
- 27 July 2016: Forward Victor Sköld leaves the club, transferring to Örebro SK.
- 27 July 2016: Goalkeeper Oliver Gustafsson leaves the club, transferring to Ljungskile SK.
- 4 August 2016: Defender Haitam Aleesami leaves the club, transferring to Palermo.
- 8 August 2016: Forward Elías Már Ómarsson joins the club on a loan deal for the rest of the season, transferring from Vålerenga.
- 11 August 2016: Defender Scott Jamieson joins the club, transferring from Western Sydney Wanderers.
- 31 August 2016: Forward Gustav Engvall leaves the club, transferring to Bristol City.

== Players ==
=== Squad ===
Note: Flags indicate national team as defined under FIFA eligibility rules; some limited exceptions apply. Players may hold more than one non-FIFA nationality.

No.	Pos.	Nation	Player
1	GK	SWE	John Alvbåge
2	DF	SWE	Emil Salomonsson
3	DF	AUS	Scott Jamieson
6	MF	SWE	Sebastian Eriksson
7	MF	DEN	Mads Albæk (vice captain)
8	MF	DEN	Søren Rieks
9	MF	DEN	Jakob Ankersen
10	FW	SWE	Tobias Hysén
11	MF	BOL	Martin Smedberg-Dalence
12	GK	SWE	Pontus Dahlberg
13	FW	ISL	Elías Már Ómarsson (on loan from Vålerenga)
14	DF	ISL	Hjálmar Jónsson

No.	Pos.	Nation	Player
16	FW	SWE	Mikael Boman
17	MF	GHA	Prosper Kasim
18	MF	GHA	Lawson Sabah
21	DF	NOR	Benjamin Zalo
22	DF	SWE	Adam Johansson
24	DF	SWE	Tom Pettersson
25	GK	SWE	Erik Dahlin
26	FW	SWE	Patrik Karlsson Lagemyr
27	DF	SWE	Billy Nordström
28	DF	NOR	Thomas Rogne
30	DF	SWE	Mattias Bjärsmyr (captain)

=== Transfers ===
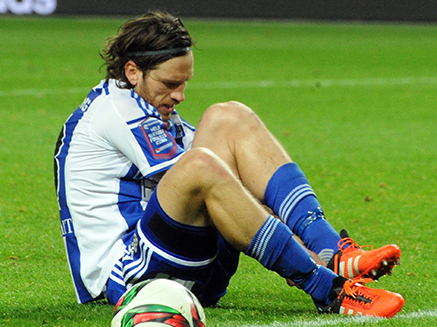
Midfielder and vice captain Gustav Svensson left the club for Chinese side Guangzhou R&F.

==== In ====
No.	Pos.	Nat.	Name	Age	Moving from	Type	Transfer window	Ends	Transfer fee	Source
23	DF	(Sweden)	Patrick Dyrestam	19	Utsiktens BK	Loan return	Winter	2015	—	ifkgoteborg.se
26	MF	(Sweden)	Karl Bohm	20	Utsiktens BK	Loan return	Winter	2017	—	ifkgoteborg.se
21	DF	(Norway)	Benjamin Zalo	17	FK Ørn-Horten	Transfer	Winter	2018	Undisclosed	ifkgoteborg.se
25	GK	(Sweden)	Erik Dahlin	26	IK Oddevold	Bosman	Winter	2017	Free	ifkgoteborg.se
26	FW	(Sweden)	Patrik Karlsson Lagemyr	19	Youth system	Promoted	Winter	2017	—	ifkgoteborg.se
10	FW	(Sweden)	Tobias Hysén	33	Shanghai SIPG	Transfer	Winter	2017	Free	ifkgoteborg.se
21	FW	(Senegal)	Malick Mané	26	Najran	Loan return	Winter	2017	—	ifkgoteborg.se
3	DF	(Iceland)	Hjörtur Hermannsson	20	PSV	Loan	Winter	2016 (June)	—	ifkgoteborg.se
31	GK	(Sweden)	Oliver Gustafsson	22	GAIS	Bosman	Winter	2016 (June)	Free	ifkgoteborg.se
13	DF	(Sweden)	Mauricio Albornoz	28	Åtvidabergs FF	Loan	Winter	2016 (June)	(~ 0.2M SEK)	ifkgoteborg.se
13	FW	(Iceland)	Elías Már Ómarsson	21	Vålerenga	Loan	Summer	2016	Free	ifkgoteborg.se
3	DF	(Australia)	Scott Jamieson	27	Western Sydney Wanderers	Transfer	Summer	2018	(~ 1.0M SEK)	ifkgoteborg.se

==== Out ====
No.	Pos.	Nat.	Name	Age	Moving to	Type	Transfer window	Transfer fee	Source
25	GK	(Sweden)	Johan Hagman	34	Retirement	End of contract	Winter	—	ifkgoteborg.se
12	GK	(Sweden)	Marcus Sandberg	25	Vålerenga	End of contract	Winter	Free	ifkgoteborg.se
26	MF	(Sweden)	Karl Bohm	20	Utsiktens BK	End of contract	Winter	Free	fotbolltransfers.com
10	FW	(Finland)	Riku Riski	26	Rosenborg	Loan return	Winter	—	ifkgoteborg.se
23	DF	(Sweden)	Patrick Dyrestam	19	Ängelholms FF	Loan	Winter	—	ifkgoteborg.se
13	MF	(Sweden)	Gustav Svensson	28	Guangzhou R&F	Transfer	Winter	(~ 5.0M SEK)	ifkgoteborg.se
21	FW	(Senegal)	Malick Mané	27	Taraz	Transfer	Winter	Free	ifkgoteborg.se
3	DF	(Iceland)	Hjörtur Hermannsson	20	PSV	Loan return	Summer	—	ifkgoteborg.se
13	DF	(Sweden)	Mauricio Albornoz	28	Åtvidabergs FF	Loan return	Summer	—	ifkgoteborg.se
20	FW	(Sweden)	Victor Sköld	26	Örebro SK	Transfer	Summer	(~ 0.3M SEK)	ifkgoteborg.se
31	GK	(Sweden)	Oliver Gustafsson	23	Ljungskile SK	End of contract	Summer	Free	ifkgoteborg.se
4	GK	(Norway)	Haitam Aleesami	25	Palermo	Transfer	Summer	(~ 13.0M SEK)	ifkgoteborg.se
19	FW	(Sweden)	Gustav Engvall	20	Bristol City	Transfer	Summer	(~ 25.0M SEK)	ifkgoteborg.se

== Squad statistics ==
=== Appearances and goals ===
As of 12 September 2016

Number	Position	Name	2016 Allsvenskan		2015–16 Svenska Cupen 2016–17 Svenska Cupen		2016–17 UEFA Europa League		Total	
Number	Position	Name	Appearances	Goals	Appearances	Goals	Appearances	Goals	Appearances	Goals
1	GK	John Alvbåge	29	0	3	0	7	0	39	0
2	DF	Emil Salomonsson	29	7	1	0	7	2	37	9
3	DF	Scott Jamieson	11	0	0	0	2	0	13	0
6	MF	Sebastian Eriksson	28	0	3	0	7	0	38	0
7	MF	Mads Albæk	26	4	3	0	8	1	37	5
8	MF	Søren Rieks	22	4	3	1	8	1	33	6
9	MF	Jakob Ankersen	29	7	3	0	6	1	38	8
10	FW	Tobias Hysén	28	10	3	1	7	3	38	13
11	MF	Martin Smedberg-Dalence	27	3	3	0	8	1	38	4
12	GK	Pontus Dahlberg	0	0	0	0	1	0	1	0
13	FW	Elías Már Ómarsson	13	6	0	0	1	0	14	6
14	DF	Hjálmar Jónsson	7	1	1	0	2	0	10	1
16	FW	Mikael Boman	15	4	3	0	7	1	25	5
17	MF	Prosper Kasim	1	0	0	0	0	0	1	0
18	MF	Lawson Sabah	11	1	1	0	0	0	12	1
20	DF	Alexander Leksell	1	0	0	0	1	0	1	0
21	DF	Benjamin Zalo	0	0	0	0	0	0	0	0
22	DF	Adam Johansson	1	0	2	0	0	0	3	0
24	DF	Tom Pettersson	19	2	0	0	7	0	26	2
25	GK	Erik Dahlin	1	0	0	0	0	0	1	0
26	FW	Patrik Karlsson Lagemyr	11	2	1	0	3	0	15	2
27	DF	Billy Nordström	8	0	1	0	2	0	11	0
28	DF	Thomas Rogne	15	0	0	0	7	1	22	1
30	DF	Mattias Bjärsmyr	23	0	1	0	8	0	32	0
Players that left the club during the season
3	DF	Hjörtur Hermannsson	7	0	3	1	0	0	10	1
4	DF	Haitam Aleesami	15	0	3	0	5	0	23	0
13	DF	Mauricio Albornoz	7	0	0	0	0	0	7	0
19	FW	Gustav Engvall	16	3	2	1	4	2	22	6
20	FW	Victor Sköld	2	0	2	1	2	1	6	2
31	GK	Oliver Gustafsson	0	0	0	0	0	0	0	0

=== Disciplinary record ===
N	P	Nat.	Name	Allsvenskan			Svenska Cupen			UEFA Europa League			Total			Notes
N	P	Nat.	Name	Yellow card	Second yellow card	Red card	Yellow card	Second yellow card	Red card	Yellow card	Second yellow card	Red card	Yellow card	Second yellow card	Red card	Notes
1	GK	(Sweden)	John Alvbåge	2									2			
2	DF	(Sweden)	Emil Salomonsson	1						1			2			
3	DF	(Iceland)	Hjörtur Hermannsson	2									2			
3	DF	(Australia)	Scott Jamieson	2									2			
4	DF	(Norway)	Haitam Aleesami	2	1								2	1		
6	MF	(Sweden)	Sebastian Eriksson	4			1			3			8			
7	MF	(Denmark)	Mads Albæk	2			1						3			
8	MF	(Denmark)	Søren Rieks	4						1			5			
9	MF	(Denmark)	Jakob Ankersen	3									3			
10	FW	(Sweden)	Tobias Hysén	1						1			2			
11	MF	(Bolivia)	Martin Smedberg-Dalence	3						2			5			
13	DF	(Sweden)	Mauricio Albornoz	1									1			
13	FW	(Iceland)	Elías Már Ómarsson	1									1			
18	MF	(Ghana)	Lawson Sabah	2									2			
19	FW	(Sweden)	Gustav Engvall	1						1			2			
24	DF	(Sweden)	Tom Pettersson							1			1			
27	DF	(Sweden)	Billy Nordström				1						1			
28	DF	(Norway)	Thomas Rogne	2						1			3			
30	DF	(Sweden)	Mattias Bjärsmyr	1			1			1			3			

Last updated: 12 September 2016
Source: ifkgoteborg.se
Only competitive matches
(yellow card) = Number of bookings; (second yellow card) = Number of sending offs after a second yellow card; (red card) = Number of sending offs by a direct red card.

== Club ==
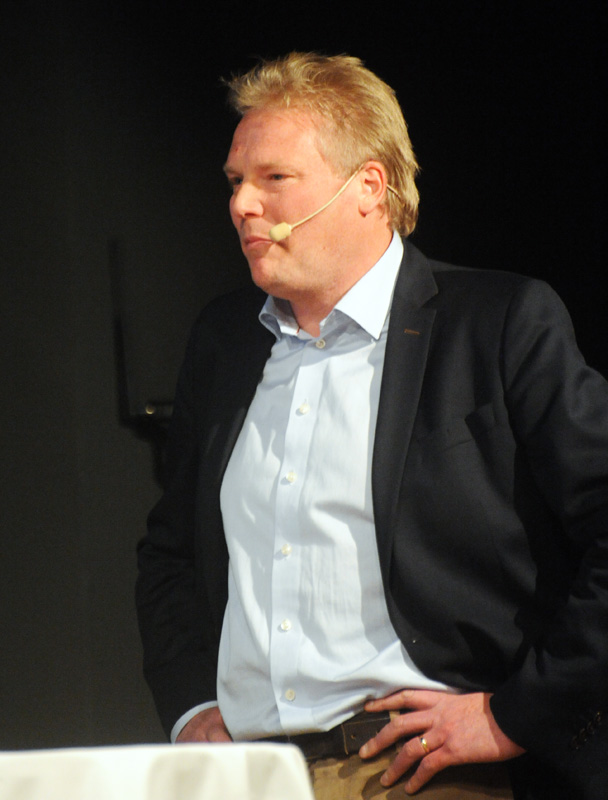
The 2016 season was Jörgen Lennartsson's second season with IFK Göteborg.

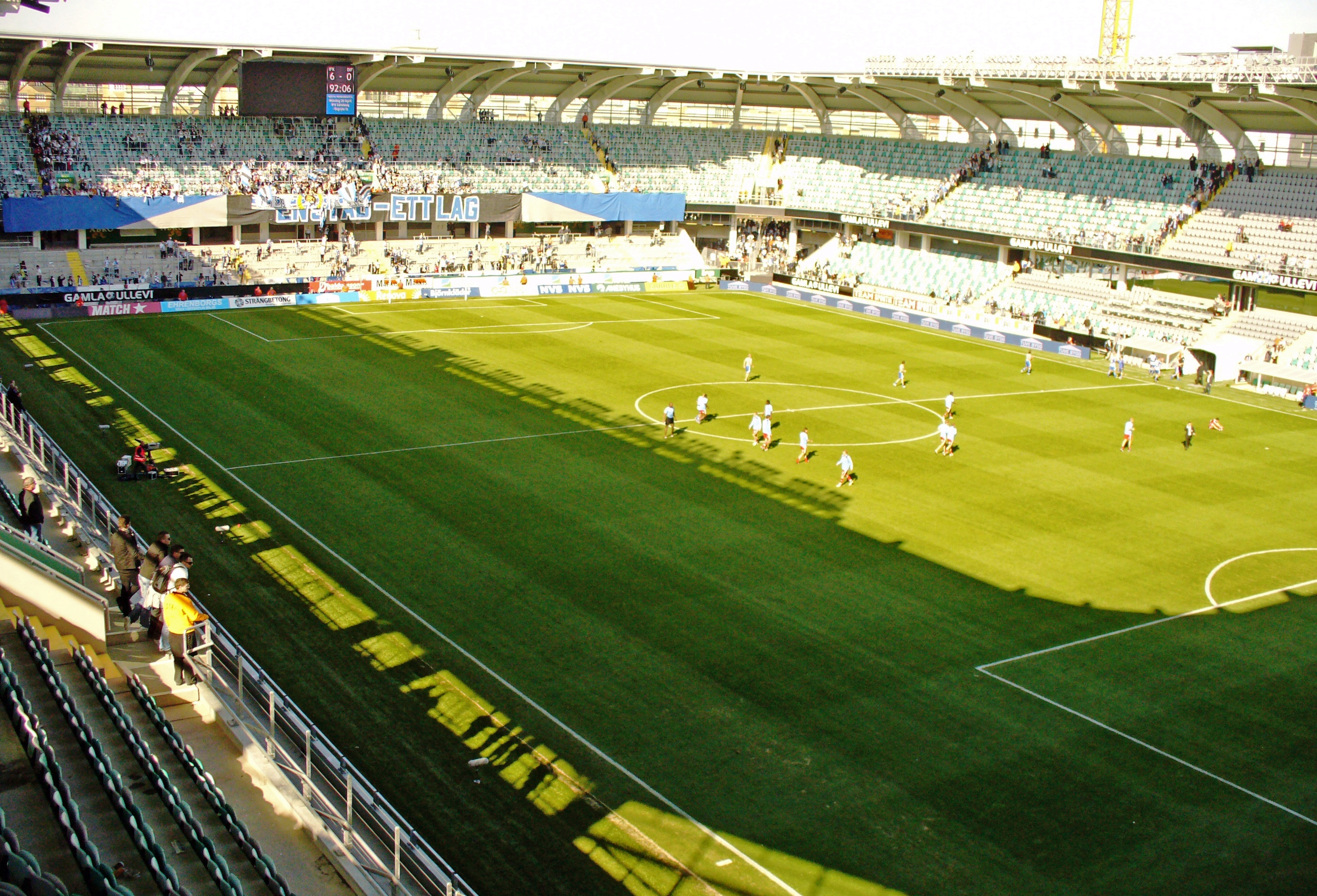
Gamla Ullevi was the fourth largest stadium in 2016 Allsvenskan.

=== Coaching staff ===
Name	Role
(Sweden) Jörgen Lennartsson	Head coach
(Sweden) Magnus Edlund	Assistant coach
(Sweden) Alf Westerberg	Assistant coach / U21 head coach
(Sweden) Johan Kristoffersson	Fitness coach
(Sweden) Stefan Remnér	Goalkeeping coach
(Sweden) Fredrik Larsson	Physiotherapist
(Sweden) Patrick Borzych	Physiotherapist
(Sweden) Tim Rahmquist	Physiotherapist
(Sweden) Jon Karlsson	Club doctor
(Sweden) Leif Swärd	Club doctor
(Sweden) Johan Örtendahl	Mental coach
(Sweden) Rolf Gustavsson	Equipment manager
(Sweden) Thomas Olsson	U19 head coach
(Sweden) Johan Claesson	U19 assistant coach
(Sweden) Roger Gustafsson	Head coach youth academy
(Sweden) Olle Sultan	Head scout
(Sweden) Linda Breding	Match analyst

=== Other information ===
Chairman	(Sweden) Frank Andersson
Club director	(Sweden) Mats Gren (caretaker)
Director of sports	(Sweden) Mats Gren
Ground (capacity and dimensions)	Gamla Ullevi (18,600 / 105x68 m)

Source: IFK Göteborg and Gamla Ullevi

== Competitions ==
=== Overall ===
Competition	Started round	Final position / round	First match	Last match
Allsvenskan	N/A	4th	3 April 2016	6 November 2016
2015–16 Svenska Cupen	Round 2	Group stage	19 August 2015	6 March 2016
UEFA Europa League	First qualifying round	Play-off round	30 June 2016	25 August 2016

Source: Competitions

=== Allsvenskan ===
==== League table ====
Pos	Team	Pld	W	D	L	GF	GA	GD	Pts	Qualification or relegation
2	AIK	30	17	9	4	52	26	+26	60	Qualification for the Europa League first qualifying round
3	IFK Norrköping	30	18	6	6	59	37	+22	60	Qualification for the Europa League first qualifying round
4	IFK Göteborg	30	14	8	8	56	47	+9	50	
5	IF Elfsborg	30	13	9	8	58	38	+20	48	
6	Kalmar FF	30	12	8	10	45	40	+5	44	

Source: svenskfotboll.se (in Swedish)
Rules for classification: 1) Points; 2) Goal difference; 3) Goals scored; 4) Head-to-head points; 5) Head-to-head goal difference; 6) Head-to-head away goals scored; 7) Play-off
(Note: Play-off is only played if need to decide champion, teams for relegation or UEFA competition and will be played on a neutral ground).

==== Results summary ====
Overall								Home						Away					
Pld	W	D	L	GF	GA	GD	Pts	W	D	L	GF	GA	GD	W	D	L	GF	GA	GD
30	14	8	8	56	47	+9	50	10	4	1	28	16	+12	4	4	7	28	31	−3

Source: svenskfotboll.se (in Swedish)

==== Results by round ====
Round	1	2	3	4	5	6	7	8	9	10	11	12	13	14	15	16	17	18	19	20	21	22	23	24	25	26	27	28	29	30
Ground	A	H	A	H	A	H	A	H	A	H	H	A	H	A	H	A	A	H	A	H	A	A	H	H	A	H	H	A	H	A
Result	W	W	D	D	L	L	W	W	L	D	W	W	W	D	W	D	L	W	L	W	L	D	W	W	L	D	W	W	D	L
Position	3	2	2	4	8	10	7	5	6	6	6	5	3	3	3	4	4	4	4	4	4	4	4	4	4	4	4	4	4	4

Source: see below
A = Away; H = Home; W = Win; D = Draw; L = Loss

==== Matches ====
Kickoff times are in UTC+2 unless stated otherwise.

3 April 2016 Round 1	Falkenbergs FF	0–2	IFK Göteborg	Falkenberg
17:30		Report	Albæk 39' (pen.); Hysén 58'	Stadium: Falkenbergs IP; Attendance: 5,326; Referee: Kristoffer Karlsson

6 April 2016 Round 2	IFK Göteborg	1–0	BK Häcken	Gothenburg
18:30	Rieks 8'	Report		Stadium: Gamla Ullevi; Attendance: 14,583; Referee: Martin Strömbergsson

11 April 2016 Round 3	AIK	3–3	IFK Göteborg	Solna
19:00	Hauksson 9'; Ishizaki 54'; Brustad 79'	Report	Hysén 29', 62'; Jónsson 58'	Stadium: Friends Arena; Attendance: 19,222; Referee: Bojan Pandžić

17 April 2016 Round 4	IFK Göteborg	1–1	Kalmar FF	Gothenburg
17:30	Salomonsson 52' (pen.)	Report	T. Eriksson 7'	Stadium: Gamla Ullevi; Attendance: 11,871; Referee: Johan Hamlin

24 April 2016 Round 5	Örebro SK	3–2	IFK Göteborg	Örebro
17:30	Åhman Persson 7'; Sema 68', 75'	Report	Boman 26'; Rieks 64'	Stadium: Eyravallen; Attendance: 8,451; Referee: Andreas Ekberg

27 April 2016 Round 6	IFK Göteborg	0–3; Awarded (Note: The match between IFK Göteborg and Malmö FF was abandoned in the 77th minute, at 0–0, after a firecracker was being thrown towards Malmö FF player and former IFK Göteborg player Tobias Sana. The assistant referee Mathias Klasenius was near the accident as well. The referee Jonas Eriksson ordered all players and club staff of the pitch and adjoining areas as the police carried the attacker off the pitch and into custody. After a 34 minute wait the match delegate Pelle Höög announced that the referee had taken the decision to not resume the match that day. On 4 May, the Disciplinary Committee of the Swedish Football Association reached a decision on the outcome of the game. Malmö FF were awarded the game 3–0.)	Malmö FF	Gothenburg
18:30		Report		Stadium: Gamla Ullevi; Attendance: 15,748; Referee: Jonas Eriksson

2 May 2016 Round 7	Gefle IF	2–6	IFK Göteborg	Gävle
19:00	Williams 25', 40'	Report	Portin 10' (o.g.); Smedberg-Dalence 57'; Ankersen 70', 71'; Hysén 79'; Karlsson Lagemyr 88'	Stadium: Gavlevallen; Attendance: 3,141; Referee: Glenn Nyberg

9 May 2016 Round 8	IFK Göteborg	2–1	Djurgårdens IF	Gothenburg
19:00	Engvall 61'; Hysén 82'	Report	Sabovic 53'	Stadium: Gamla Ullevi; Attendance: 12,214; Referee: Stefan Johannesson

15 May 2016 Round 9	Östersunds FK	2–0	IFK Göteborg	Östersund
17:30	Mukiibi 65'; Ghoddos 71'	Report		Stadium: Jämtkraft Arena; Attendance: 7,159; Referee: Andreas Ekberg

19 May 2016 Round 10	IFK Göteborg	1–1	IFK Norrköping	Gothenburg
19:00	Salomonsson 87'	Report	Traustason 49'	Stadium: Gamla Ullevi; Attendance: 15,024; Referee: Martin Strömbergsson

23 May 2016 Round 11	IFK Göteborg	2–1	Hammarby IF	Gothenburg
19:00	Smedberg-Dalence 7'; Boman 67'	Report	Sævarsson 87'	Stadium: Gamla Ullevi; Attendance: 13,209; Referee: Stefan Johannesson

29 May 2016 Round 12	Helsingborgs IF	1–3	IFK Göteborg	Helsingborg
15:00	Dahlberg 78'	Report	Ankersen 41'; Engvall 64'; Karlsson Lagemyr 90+2'	Stadium: Olympia; Attendance: 9,267; Referee: Bojan Pandžić

10 July 2016 Round 13	IFK Göteborg	4–1	GIF Sundsvall	Gothenburg
15:00	Engvall 2'; Salomonsson 34'; Boman 60'; Pettersson 90+2'	Report	Dibba 40'	Stadium: Gamla Ullevi; Attendance: 10,146; Referee: Mohammed Al-Hakim

17 July 2016 Round 14	IF Elfsborg	1–1	IFK Göteborg	Borås
15:00	Hedlund 56'	Report	Boman 34'	Stadium: Borås Arena; Attendance: 13,372; Referee: Kristoffer Karlsson

24 July 2016 Round 15	IFK Göteborg	2–1	Jönköpings Södra IF	Gothenburg
17:30	Albæk 13', 33'	Report	Cibicki 14'	Stadium: Gamla Ullevi; Attendance: 12,186; Referee: Markus Strömbergsson

31 July 2016 Round 16	Jönköpings Södra IF	1–1	IFK Göteborg	Jönköping
15:00	Fendrich 62'	Report	Hysén 85'	Stadium: Stadsparksvallen; Attendance: 6,247; Referee: Kaspar Sjöberg

8 August 2016 Round 17	Djurgårdens IF	3–1	IFK Göteborg	Stockholm
19:00	Olunga 28', 65'; Ranégie 29'	Report	Pettersson 24'	Stadium: Tele2 Arena; Attendance: 13,681; Referee: Andreas Ekberg

12 August 2016 Round 18	IFK Göteborg	2–0	Falkenbergs FF	Gothenburg
19:00	Smedberg-Dalence 60'; Salomonsson 83' (pen.)	Report		Stadium: Gamla Ullevi; Attendance: 9,327; Referee: Robert Daradić

21 August 2016 Round 19	Hammarby IF	2–0	IFK Göteborg	Stockholm
15:00	Haglund 20'; Bakircioglu 90+1'	Report		Stadium: Tele2 Arena; Attendance: 21,848; Referee: Johan Hamlin

28 August 2016 Round 20	IFK Göteborg	2–0	Helsingborgs IF	Gothenburg
17:30	Ómarsson 1'; Ankersen 70'	Report		Stadium: Gamla Ullevi; Attendance: 9,445; Referee: Mohammed Al-Hakim

12 September 2016 Round 21	Malmö FF	3–1	IFK Göteborg	Malmö
19:00	Rosenberg 15', 79'; Jeremejeff 77'	Report	Jeremejeff 67' (o.g.)	Stadium: Swedbank Stadion; Attendance: 21,273; Referee: Stefan Johannesson

19 September 2016 Round 22	BK Häcken	2–2	IFK Göteborg	Gothenburg
19:00	Owoeri 65'; Kamara 69'	Report	Salomonsson 15' (pen.); Ómarsson 61'	Stadium: Bravida Arena; Attendance: 6,380; Referee: Andreas Ekberg

22 September 2016 Round 23	IFK Göteborg	3–2	Örebro SK	Gothenburg
19:00	Hysén 41', 75'; Ómarsson 56'	Report	Besara 46'; Ajdarević 81'	Stadium: Gamla Ullevi; Attendance: 8,886; Referee: Patrik Eriksson

26 September 2016 Round 24	IFK Göteborg	2–0	Östersunds FK	Gothenburg
19:00	Rieks 34'; Ómarsson 73'	Report		Stadium: Gamla Ullevi; Attendance: 10,211; Referee: Stefan Johannesson

2 October 2016 Round 25	Kalmar FF	4–2	IFK Göteborg	Kalmar
15:00	Romário 15', 29'; Ring 43'; Eid 83'	Report	Hysén 75', 85'	Stadium: Guldfågeln Arena; Attendance: 6,195; Referee: Kaspar Sjöberg

17 October 2016 Round 26	IFK Göteborg	3–3	Gefle IF	Gothenburg
19:00	Salomonsson 43'; Rieks 53'; Ankersen 81'	Report	Skrabb 6'; Rauschenberg 70' (pen.); Nadeau 90+3'	Stadium: Gamla Ullevi; Attendance: 8,144; Referee: Johan Krantz

24 October 2016 Round 27	IFK Göteborg	1–0	AIK	Gothenburg
19:00	Ómarsson 26'	Report		Stadium: Gamla Ullevi; Attendance: 13,132; Referee: Andreas Ekberg

27 October 2016 Round 28	GIF Sundsvall	1–3	IFK Göteborg	Sundsvall
19:00	Eklund 37'	Report	Ankersen 7', 14'; Ómarsson 77'	Stadium: Idrottsparken; Attendance: 4,213; Referee: Glenn Nyberg

31 October 2016 Round 29	IFK Göteborg	2–2	IF Elfsborg	Gothenburg
19:00 UTC+1	Salomonsson 68' (pen.); Albæk 84'	Report	Frick 21', 75'	Stadium: Gamla Ullevi; Attendance: 12,671; Referee: Stefan Johannesson

6 November 2016 Round 30	IFK Norrköping	3–1	IFK Göteborg	Norrköping
15:00 UTC+1	Andersson 23', 47'; Bärkroth 58'	Report	Sabah 10'	Stadium: Nya Parken; Attendance: 7,483; Referee: Martin Strömbergsson

=== Svenska Cupen ===
==== 2015–16 ====
The tournament continued from the 2015 season.

Kickoff times are in UTC+1.

===== Group stage =====
Pos	Team	Pld	W	D	L	GF	GA	GD	Pts	Qualification	HBK	IFKG	IKF	DEG
1	Halmstads BK	3	2	0	1	5	3	+2	6	Advance to Knockout stage	—	—	2–0	3–0
2	IFK Göteborg	3	1	2	0	5	2	+3	5		3–0	—	—	1–1
3	IK Frej	3	0	2	1	2	4	−2	2		—	1–1	—	—
4	Degerfors IF	3	0	2	1	2	5	−3	2		—	—	1–1	—

Source: Swedish Football Association
Rules for classification: 1) Points; 2) Goal difference; 3) Goals scored; 4) Head-to-head record; 5) Highest ranked team

21 February 2016 Matchday 1	IFK Göteborg	1–1	Degerfors IF	Gothenburg
16:00	Hermannsson 28'	Report	Samuelsson 59'	Stadium: Bravida Arena; Attendance: 3,607; Referee: Johan Hamlin

28 February 2016 Matchday 2	IK Frej	1–1	IFK Göteborg	Solna
16:30	Runnemo 31'	Report	Sköld 13'	Stadium: Skytteholms IP; Attendance: 941; Referee: Johan Krantz

6 March 2016 Matchday 3	IFK Göteborg	3–0	Halmstads BK	Gothenburg
16:00	Engvall 13'; Rieks 33'; Hysén 65'	Report		Stadium: Bravida Arena; Attendance: 1,815; Referee: Andreas Ekberg

==== 2016–17 ====
The tournament continued into the 2017 season.

===== Qualification stage =====
13 October 2016 Round 2	Oskarshamns AIK	0–6	IFK Göteborg	Oskarshamn
18:30 UTC+2		Report	Rieks 3', 5', 50'; Bjärsmyr 10'; Albæk 56'; Pettersson 80'	Stadium: Arena Oskarshamn; Attendance: 1,223; Referee: Mikael Eriksson

=== UEFA Europa League ===
Kickoff times are in UTC+2 unless stated otherwise.

==== Qualifying phase and play-off round ====
===== First qualifying round =====
30 June 2016 First leg	IFK Göteborg (Sweden)	5–0	(Wales) Llandudno	Gothenburg
18:30	Engvall 11'; Rieks 12'; Salomonsson 36'; Hysén 79', 81'	Report		Stadium: Gamla Ullevi; Attendance: 6,074; Referee: Martin Lundby (Norway)

7 July 2016 Second leg	Llandudno (Wales)	1–2 (1–7 agg.)	(Sweden) IFK Göteborg	Bangor
19:00 UTC+1	Hughes 72'	Report	Smedberg-Dalence 36'; Sköld 54'	Stadium: Nantporth; Attendance: 841; Referee: Tiago Martins (Portugal)

===== Second qualifying round =====
14 July 2016 First leg	Piast Gliwice (Poland)	0–3	(Sweden) IFK Göteborg	Gliwice
20:45		Report	Rogne 2'; Hysén 35'; Engvall 86'	Stadium: Stadion Piast; Attendance: 5,629; Referee: Manuel Schüttengruber (Austria)

21 July 2016 Second leg	IFK Göteborg (Sweden)	0–0 (3–0 agg.)	(Poland) Piast Gliwice	Gothenburg
19:00		Report		Stadium: Gamla Ullevi; Attendance: 7,276; Referee: Georgios Kominis (Greece)

===== Third qualifying round =====
28 July 2016 First leg	IFK Göteborg (Sweden)	1–2	(Finland) HJK	Gothenburg
19:00	Salomonsson 73'	Report	Tanaka 47'; Morelos 75'	Stadium: Gamla Ullevi; Attendance: 9,046; Referee: Kevin Clancy (Scotland)

4 August 2016 Second leg	HJK (Finland)	0–2 (2–3 agg.)	(Sweden) IFK Göteborg	Helsinki
18:00 UTC+3		Report	Boman 35'; Ankersen 82'	Stadium: Sonera Stadium; Attendance: 10,107; Referee: Anatoliy Zhabchenko (Ukraine)

===== Play-off round =====
18 August 2016 First leg	IFK Göteborg (Sweden)	1–0	(Azerbaijan) Qarabağ	Gothenburg
19:00	Albæk 56'	Report		Stadium: Gamla Ullevi; Attendance: 11,458; Referee: Paweł Raczkowski (Poland)

25 August 2016 Second leg	Qarabağ (Azerbaijan)	3–0 (3–1 agg.)	(Sweden) IFK Göteborg	Baku
20:30 UTC+4	Sadygov 19'; Muarem 26'; Quintana 51'	Report		Stadium: Tofiq Bahramov Republican Stadium; Attendance: 25,500; Referee: Vladislav Bezborodov (Russia)

== Non-competitive ==
=== Pre-season ===
Kickoff times are in UTC+1 unless stated otherwise.

30 January 2016 Friendly	IFK Göteborg (Sweden)	1–0	(Norway) Sarpsborg 08	Gothenburg, Sweden
15:00	Engvall 84'	Report		Stadium: Prioritet Serneke Arena; Attendance: 2,048; Referee: Bojan Pandžić (Gothenburg)

4 February 2016 The Dubai International Cup	FC Midtjylland (Denmark)	2–2 (5–6 p)	(Sweden) IFK Göteborg	Dubai, United Arab Emirates
16:00 UTC+4	M. Anderson 28'; Poulsen 38' (pen.)	Report	Albæk 76', 77' (pen.)	Stadium: The Sevens Stadium; Attendance: 46; Referee: Abdulla Al Harthi (United Arab Emirates)
	Penalties
	Onuachu (penalty missed); Døhr Thychosen (penalty scored); Ureña (penalty scored); Royer (penalty scored); Poulsen (penalty scored); Banggaard (penalty scored); Bödvarsson (penalty missed)		(penalty missed) Hysén; (penalty scored) Sköld; (penalty scored) Bjärsmyr; (penalty scored) Eriksson; (penalty scored) Smedberg-Dalence; (penalty scored) Johansson; (penalty scored) Aleesami

9 February 2016 The Dubai International Cup	IFK Göteborg (Sweden)	2–1	(Norway) Molde FK	Dubai, United Arab Emirates
15:30 UTC+4	Boman 42'; Pettersson 72'	Report	S. Svendsen 74'	Stadium: The Sevens Stadium; Attendance: 63; Referee: Yaseen Almansoori (United Arab Emirates)

14 February 2016 Friendly	IFK Göteborg (Sweden)	2–0	(Norway) Stabæk	Gothenburg, Sweden
16:00	Rieks 12'; Hysén 34'	Report		Stadium: Prioritet Serneke Arena; Attendance: 2,014; Referee: Bojan Pandžić (Gothenburg)

11 March 2016 Friendly	IFK Göteborg	3–1	Jönköpings Södra IF	Gothenburg, Sweden
16:00	Rieks 23'; Salomonsson 39', 53' (pen.)	Report	Gojani 74'	Stadium: Prioritet Serneke Arena; Attendance: 1,041; Referee: Antti Kanerva (Olofstorp)

19 March 2016 Friendly	IFK Göteborg	1–1	Djurgårdens IF	Gothenburg, Sweden
15:00	Ankersen 64'	Report	Walker 79'	Stadium: Ullevi; Attendance: 2,063; Referee: Adnan Jukić (Falkenberg)

24 March 2016 Friendly	IFK Göteborg (Sweden)	0–3	(Denmark) Randers FC	Gothenburg, Sweden
14:00		Report	Ishak 17', 65'; Babayan 85'	Stadium: Hjällbovallen; Attendance: 337; Referee: Bojan Pandžić (Gothenburg)

=== Mid-season ===
23 June 2016 Friendly	IFK Göteborg (Sweden)	2–2	(Norway) Strømsgodset	Stenungsund, Sweden
16:00 UTC+2	Engvall 50'; Boman 70'	Report	Agouda 84'; Vilsvik 90+3'	Stadium: Nösnäsvallen; Attendance: 604; Referee: Bojan Pandžić (Gothenburg)
