= Marcus Bergholtz =

Swedish footballer

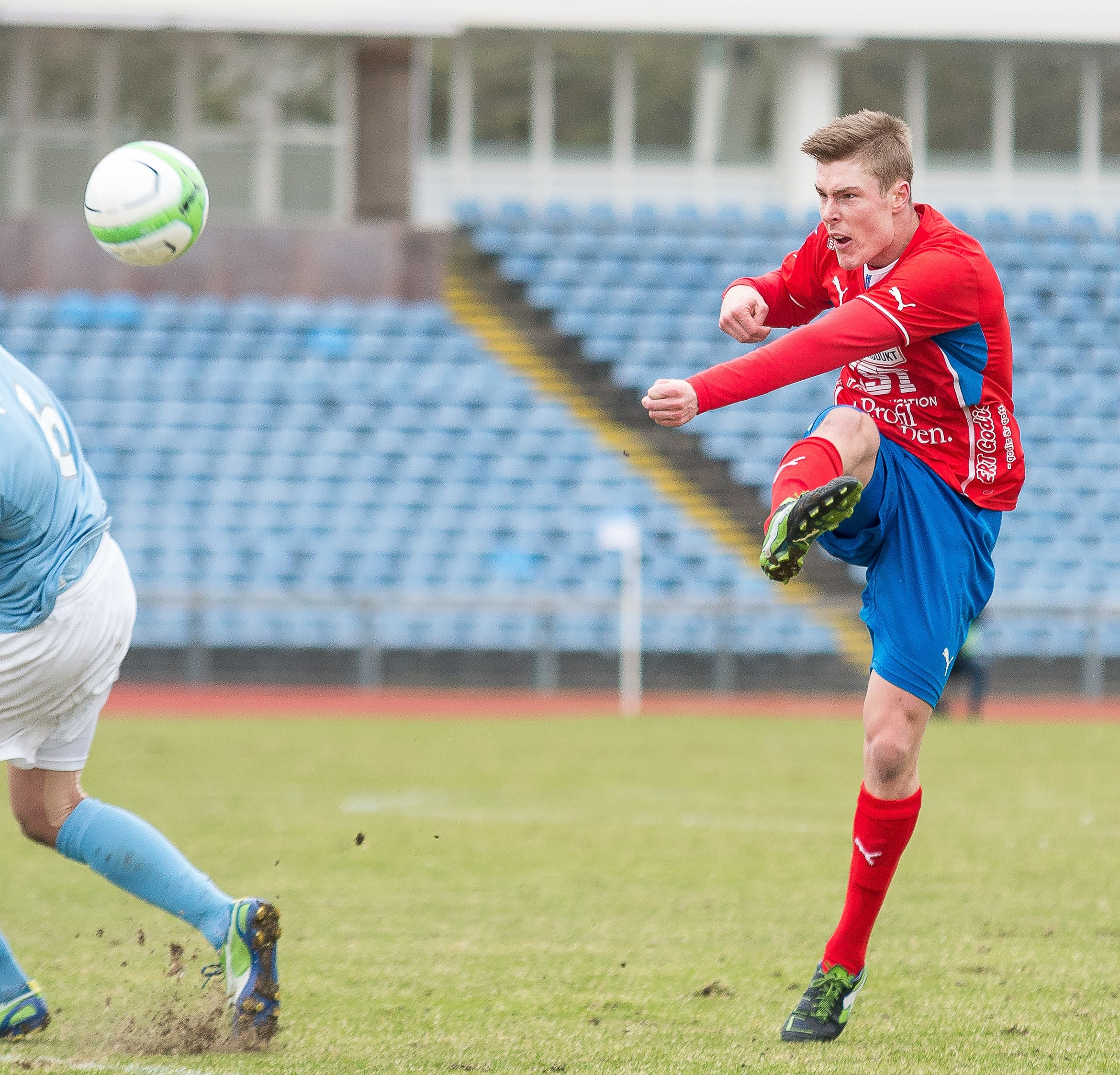

Personal information
- Full name: Marcus Edvin Bergholtz
- Date of birth: 15 December 1989 (age 36)
- Place of birth: Örkelljunga, Sweden
- Height: 1.86 m (6 ft 1 in)
- Position: Midfielder

Youth career
- 1995–2003: Ekets GoIF
- 2004–2007: Helsingborgs IF

Senior career*
Years	Team	Apps	(Gls)
2008–2012	Helsingborgs IF	35	(0)
2010	→ Ängelholms FF (loan)	12	(2)
2011	→ Stabæk (loan)	3	(0)
2012–2014	Östers IF	50	(7)
2015–2016	Ängelholms FF	52	(5)
2017	Utsiktens BK	23	(0)
2018–2019	GAIS	54	(4)
2020	Lindome GIF	19	(0)
2021	IFK Rössjöholm	4	(0)

International career
2008	Sweden U19	5	(0)
- * Club domestic league appearances and goals as of 13 February 2023

Marcus Edvin Bergholtz (born 15 December 1989 in Örkelljunga) is a Swedish footballer who plays as a midfielder.

== Career ==
He began his career in Ekets GoIF in his home village of Eket, near Örkelljunga in northern Skåne. Bergholtz was then recruited to Helsingborgs IF for the 2004 season. In 2007, Bergholtz went on a trial at Premier League club West Ham, who were interested in buying him, but when the club did not agree to Helsingborg's demands, the deal ran aground. He made his debut from the start in the Allsvenskan match between Helsingborgs IF and IFK Göteborg on 4 October 2008 and played 13 matches for HIF during the 2008 season.

In January 2020, Bergholtz was recruited by Division 1 club Lindome GIF.
