= Farmen 2013 (Sweden) =

- Season 6
- Presented by: Linda Lindorff
- No. of days: 50
- No. of contestants: 15
- Winner: Erik Persson
- Runner-up: Janikke Taflin
- Location: Norn iron works, Hedemora, Sweden

Release
- Original network: TV4
- Original release: January 7 – March 15, 2013

Season chronology
- ← Previous; Farmen Skärgården Next → Farmen 2014

Farmen 2013 (The Farm 2013) is the sixth season of the Swedish reality television series Farmen and the first to air since 2004. The season is filmed at the Norn iron works where 15 Swedes live on a farm like it was a century prior, competing in tasks, challenges and more to win items for the farm. At the end of each week, two contestants face off in a duel with the loser eliminated. The season is hosted by Linda Lindorff and the season premiered on 7 January 2013 on TV4 and concluded on 15 March 2013 where Erik Persson won in the final duel against Janikke Taflin to win the grand prize of 500,000 kr..

== Finishing order ==
(age are stated at time of competition)

Contestant	Age	Residence	Entered	Exited	Status	Finish
Agnes Löfqvist	23	Malmö	Day 1	Day 5	1st Evicted; Day 5	15th
Melker Djurstedt	21	Södra Vi	Day 1	Day 13	Quit; Day 13	14th
Matilda Ternvall	19	Barkarby	Day 1	Day 16	Quit; Day 16	13th
Dolores Martin	53	Stockholm	Day 1	Day 10	2nd Evicted; Day 10	12th
Dolores Martin	53	Stockholm	Day 15	Day 17	Quit; Day 17	12th
Rimon Lahdo	27	Örebro	Day 1	Day 17	Quit; Day 17	11th
Carl-Peder "Kalle" Hedebratt	36	Eskilstuna	Day 1	Day 20	4th Evicted; Day 20	10th
Sören Mård	58	Mockfjärd	Day 1	Day 25	5th Evicted; Day 25	9th
Sanna Sjöström	24	Sundsvall	Day 26	Day 30	6th Evicted; Day 30	8th
Paul Melén	46	Karlskrona	Day 1	Day 34	Quit; Day 34	7th
Martin Vestman	23	Skånes-Fagerhult	Day 26	Day 35	7th Evicted; Day 35	6th
Maria Anderberg	47	Brösarp	Day 1	Day 40	8th Evicted; Day 40	5th
Anna-Karin "AK" Nyberg	40	Boden	Day 1	Day 15	3rd Evicted; Day 15	4th
Anna-Karin "AK" Nyberg	40	Boden	Day 17	Day 45	9th Evicted; Day 45	4th
Stefan Kemi	49	Nyköping	Day 26	Day 49	10th Evicted; Day 49	3rd
Janikke Taflin	20	Holmsund	Day 1	Day 50	Runner-up; Day 50	2nd
Erik Persson	32	Kolsva	Day 1	Day 50	Winner; Day 50	1st

== The game ==
Week	Farmer of the Week	1st Dueler	2nd Dueler	Evicted	Finish
1	Paul	Agnes	Matilda	Agnes	1st Evicted; Day 5
2	Maria	Dolores	Janikke	Dolores	2nd Evicted; Day 10
3	Rimon	Maria	AK	Melker	Quit; Day 13
3	Rimon	Maria	AK	AK	3rd Evicted; Day 15
4	Maria	Paul	Kalle	Matilda	Quit; Day 16
4	Maria	Paul	Kalle	Dolores	Quit; Day 17
4	Maria	Paul	Kalle	Rimon	Quit; Day 17
4	Maria	Paul	Kalle	Kalle	4th Evicted; Day 20
5	AK	Sören	Erik	Sören	5th Evicted; Day 25
6	Maria	Sanna	Janikke	Sanna	6th Evicted; Day 30
7	Janikke	Martin	Maria	Paul	Quit; Day 34
7	Janikke	Martin	Maria	Martin	7th Evicted; Day 35
8	Stefan	Maria	AK	Maria	8th Evicted; Day 40
9	Janikke	Stefan	AK	AK	9th Evicted; Day 45
10	None	Stefan	Erik	Stefan	10th Evicted; Day 49
10	None	Jannike	Erik	Jannike	Runner-up; Day 50
10	None	Jannike	Erik	Erik	Winner; Day 50
