= Norn =

Norn or Norns may refer to:

- Norn language, an extinct North Germanic language that was spoken in Northern Isles of Scotland
- Norns, beings from Norse mythology
- Norn iron works, an old industrial community in Sweden where iron ore was excavated
- NORN (clothing brand), a clothing brand specialized in winter trouser manufacturing
- Norns, a fictional race in Tad Williams' Memory, Sorrow, and Thorn fantasy series
- Norns, main species in the Creatures artificial-life simulation series
- Norn, a playable race in the MMORPG Guild Wars 2
- Norn, a race that has conquered the world, in John Campbell's science fiction series Cloak of Aesir written at the start of the Golden Age
- Mey Norn, Cambodian politician
