= Mia Carlsson =

Swedish soccer player (born 1990)

Personal information
- Full name: Mia Matilda Carlsson
- Date of birth: 12 March 1990 (age 36)
- Place of birth: Skånes-Fagerhult, Sweden
- Height: 5 ft 7 in (1.70 m)
- Position: Defender

Youth career
- Skånes Fagerhult; Vittsjö GIK

Senior career*
Years	Team	Apps	(Gls)
2009–2023	Kristianstads	203	(15)

International career
2006–2007	Sweden U17		(2)
2008–2010	Sweden U19		(2)
2012–2013	Sweden U23		(0)
2014–2019	Sweden	11	(0)
- * Club domestic league appearances and goals

Mia Matilda Carlsson (born Karlsson 12 March 1990 in Skånes-Fagerhult) is a Swedish soccer player (defender) who has played for Kristianstads DFF since 2009. Prior to the 2018 season she signed on for another year.

Prior to the 2015 season Carlsson signed a three-year contract with Kristianstads DFF. During the season of 2016 she was named "Player of the year" by the Swedish women referees (SEDD). Prior to the 2018 season she signed on for another year. By the end of the 2016 season she had played 155 professional games in the Damallsvenskan for Kristianstad, all of them as a starter.

She made her debut with the Swedish national team at 17, scoring two goals during that season. She also represented Sweden on the U19 and U23 national teams and is currently on the first team.

== Honours ==
Sweden

- Algarve Cup: 2018
