= 2017 IFK Göteborg season =

IFK Göteborg
2017 season
- Chairman: Frank Andersson
- Head coach: Jörgen Lennartsson (until 18 July); Alf Westerberg (interim, from 18 July)
- Stadium: Gamla Ullevi
- Allsvenskan: 10th
- 2016–17 Svenska Cupen: Quarter-finals
- Top goalscorer: League: Tobias Hysén (9); All: Mikael Boman (11)
- Highest home attendance: 32,129 vs. Malmö FF (1 April 2017, Allsvenskan)
- Lowest home attendance: 1,281 vs. Arameisk-Syrianska IF (26 February 2017, Svenska Cupen); Allsvenskan: 6,769 vs. GIF Sundsvall (5 November 2017)
- Average home league attendance: 12,299
Home colours	Away colours	Third colours

The 2017 season was IFK Göteborg's 112th in existence, their 85th season in Allsvenskan and their 41st consecutive season in the league. They competed in Allsvenskan and Svenska Cupen.

== Players ==
=== Squad ===
Note: Flags indicate national team as defined under FIFA eligibility rules; some limited exceptions apply. Players may hold more than one non-FIFA nationality.

No.	Pos.	Nation	Player
2	DF	SWE	Emil Salomonsson
3	DF	SWE	Billy Nordström
5	DF	CAN	Sam Adekugbe (on loan from Vancouver Whitecaps)
6	MF	SWE	Sebastian Eriksson (captain)
7	FW	SWE	Tobias Hysén
8	MF	DEN	Søren Rieks
9	FW	ISL	Elías Már Ómarsson
11	MF	BOL	Martin Smedberg-Dalence
12	GK	SWE	Pontus Dahlberg
15	DF	SWE	Kristopher Da Graca

No.	Pos.	Nation	Player
16	FW	SWE	Mikael Boman
19	MF	SWE	August Erlingmark
21	DF	NOR	Benjamin Zalo
22	MF	NOR	Vajebah Sakor (on loan from Juventus)
23	DF	SWE	David Boo Wiklander (vice captain)
24	FW	SWE	Sebastian Ohlsson
25	GK	SWE	Erik Dahlin
26	FW	SWE	Patrik Karlsson Lagemyr
28	DF	NOR	Thomas Rogne
42	MF	USA	Mix Diskerud (on loan from New York City)

== Club ==
=== Other information ===
Chairman	(Sweden) Frank Andersson
Club director	(Sweden) Mats Palmgren (caretaker)
Director of sports	(Sweden) Mats Gren
Ground (capacity and dimensions)	Gamla Ullevi (18,600 / 105x68 m)

Source: IFK Göteborg and Gamla Ullevi

== Competitions ==
=== Overall ===
Competition	Started round	Final position / round	First match	Last match
Allsvenskan	N/A	10th	1 April 2017	5 November 2017
2016–17 Svenska Cupen	Round 2	Quarter-finals	13 October 2016	11 March 2017

Source: Competitions

=== Allsvenskan ===
==== League table ====
Pos	Team	Pld	W	D	L	GF	GA	GD	Pts
8	IF Elfsborg	30	10	9	11	53	59	−6	39
9	Hammarby IF	30	9	11	10	42	43	−1	38
10	IFK Göteborg	30	9	10	11	42	40	+2	37
11	Örebro SK	30	10	6	14	38	54	−16	36
12	Kalmar FF	30	9	5	16	30	49	−19	32

Source: svenskfotboll.se (in Swedish)
Rules for classification: 1) Points; 2) Goal difference; 3) Goals scored; 4) Head-to-head points; 5) Head-to-head goal difference; 6) Head-to-head away goals scored; 7) Play-off
(Note: Play-off is only played if need to decide champion, teams for relegation or UEFA competition and will be played on a neutral ground).

==== Results summary ====
Overall								Home						Away					
Pld	W	D	L	GF	GA	GD	Pts	W	D	L	GF	GA	GD	W	D	L	GF	GA	GD
30	9	10	11	42	40	+2	37	4	8	3	23	18	+5	5	2	8	19	22	−3

Source: svenskfotboll.se (in Swedish)

==== Results by round ====
Round	1	2	3	4	5	6	7	8	9	10	11	12	13	14	15	16	17	18	19	20	21	22	23	24	25	26	27	28	29	30
Ground	H	A	H	A	H	A	H	A	H	A	H	A	A	H	A	H	H	A	A	H	A	H	H	A	A	H	A	H	A	H
Result	D	W	D	D	D	L	W	L	W	W	D	L	W	D	L	D	W	L	W	D	D	L	D	L	L	W	W	L	L	L
Position	8	2	4	6	6	12	9	10	8	6	5	9	7	9	10	10	8	9	8	7	9	10	9	10	11	8	7	8	9	10

Source: see below
A = Away; H = Home; W = Win; D = Draw; L = Loss

==== Matches ====
Kickoff times are in UTC+2 unless stated otherwise.

1 April 2017 Round 1	IFK Göteborg	1–1	Malmö FF	Gothenburg
13:00	Boman 8'	Report	Cibicki 34'	Stadium: Ullevi; Attendance: 32,129; Referee: Stefan Johannesson

9 April 2017 Round 2	IK Sirius	0–2	IFK Göteborg	Uppsala
17:30		Report	Diskerud 63'; Boman 85'	Stadium: Studenternas IP; Attendance: 7,248; Referee: Andreas Ekberg

17 April 2017 Round 3	IFK Göteborg	1–1	AFC Eskilstuna	Gothenburg
17:30	Hysén 52'	Report	Buya Turay 64'	Stadium: Gamla Ullevi; Attendance: 10,116; Referee: Patrik Eriksson

23 April 2017 Round 4	Östersunds FK	1–1	IFK Göteborg	Östersund
17:30	Edwards 62'	Report	Salomonsson 90+3' (pen.)	Stadium: Jämtkraft Arena; Attendance: 4,317; Referee: Glenn Nyberg

26 April 2017 Round 5	IFK Göteborg	1–1	Hammarby IF	Gothenburg
19:00	Boman 90+1'	Report	Rogne 42' (o.g.)	Stadium: Gamla Ullevi; Attendance: 12,149; Referee: Stefan Johannesson

2 May 2017 Round 6	BK Häcken	4–0	IFK Göteborg	Gothenburg
18:30	Bjärsmyr 7' (o.g.); Mohammed 21'; Kamara 28'; Paulinho 86'	Report		Stadium: Bravida Arena; Attendance: 5,676; Referee: Markus Strömbergsson

7 May 2017 Round 7	IFK Göteborg	3–0	Kalmar FF	Gothenburg
15:00	Rieks 4'; Hysén 19'; Bjärsmyr 68'	Report		Stadium: Gamla Ullevi; Attendance: 9,282; Referee: Johan Hamlin

15 May 2017 Round 8	Djurgårdens IF	1–0	IFK Göteborg	Stockholm
19:00	Karlström 79'	Report		Stadium: Tele2 Arena; Attendance: 16,299; Referee: Andreas Ekberg

22 May 2017 Round 10	GIF Sundsvall	0–4	IFK Göteborg	Sundsvall
19:00		Report	Hysén 32', 45'; Salomonsson 34' (pen.); Albæk 86'	Stadium: Idrottsparken; Attendance: 5,046; Referee: Kristoffer Karlsson

28 May 2017 Round 11	IFK Göteborg	1–1	IF Elfsborg	Gothenburg
17:30	Hysén 40'	Report	Jebali 3'	Stadium: Gamla Ullevi; Attendance: 12,837; Referee: Martin Strömbergsson

4 June 2017 Round 12	IFK Norrköping	2–0	IFK Göteborg	Norrköping
17:30	Moberg Karlsson 36'; Eliasson 68'	Report		Stadium: Nya Parken; Attendance: 10,233; Referee: Mohammed Al-Hakim

2 July 2017 Round 13	Jönköpings Södra IF	0–2	IFK Göteborg	Jönköping
15:00		Report	Diskerud 27'; Hysén 76'	Stadium: Stadsparksvallen; Attendance: 5,627; Referee: Mohammed Al-Hakim

10 July 2017 Round 14	IFK Göteborg	1–1	Halmstads BK	Gothenburg
19:00	Albæk 56'	Report	Hakšabanović 79'	Stadium: Gamla Ullevi; Attendance: 11,328; Referee: Patrik Eriksson

16 July 2017 Round 15	Örebro SK	4–2	IFK Göteborg	Örebro
15:00	Besara 10', 22', 35'; Gerzić 17'	Report	Boo Wiklander 60'; Salomonsson 66' (pen.)	Stadium: Eyravallen; Attendance: 6,049; Referee: Bojan Pandžić

23 July 2017 Round 16	IFK Göteborg	2–2	Örebro SK	Gothenburg
17:30	Rieks 58'; Boman 63'	Report	Igboananike 82' (pen.); Sema 90+7' (pen.)	Stadium: Gamla Ullevi; Attendance: 10,330; Referee: Kaspar Sjöberg

30 July 2017 Round 17	IFK Göteborg	4–1	IFK Norrköping	Gothenburg
15:00	Rieks 40'; Diskerud 45+1'; Sakor 83'; Erlingmark 87'	Report	Holmberg 21'	Stadium: Gamla Ullevi; Attendance: 11,347; Referee: Andreas Ekberg

6 August 2017 Round 18	Kalmar FF	1–0	IFK Göteborg	Kalmar
15:00	V. Elm 90+4'	Report		Stadium: Guldfågeln Arena; Attendance: 9,330; Referee: Patrik Eriksson

10 August 2017 Round 9	IFK Göteborg	2–1	AIK	Gothenburg
19:00	Rieks 55'; Boman 65'	Report	Affane 4'	Stadium: Gamla Ullevi; Attendance: 16,187; Referee: Mohammed Al-Hakim

14 August 2017 Round 19	IF Elfsborg	1–2	IFK Göteborg	Borås
19:00	Lundevall 2'	Report	Hysén 5'; Rieks 56'	Stadium: Borås Arena; Attendance: 11,979; Referee: Stefan Johannesson

20 August 2017 Round 20	IFK Göteborg	1–1	BK Häcken	Gothenburg
17:30	Eriksson 28'	Report	Mohammed 32'	Stadium: Gamla Ullevi; Attendance: 13,443; Referee: Mohammed Al-Hakim

27 August 2017 Round 21	Malmö FF	2–2	IFK Göteborg	Malmö
17:30	Berget 65'; Rosenberg 82'	Report	Hysén 3'; Eriksson 86'	Stadium: Swedbank Stadion; Attendance: 21,354; Referee: Andreas Ekberg

11 September 2017 Round 22	IFK Göteborg	1–3	Djurgårdens IF	Gothenburg
19:00	Boman 45+1'	Report	Mrabti 18', 52'; Karlström 54'	Stadium: Gamla Ullevi; Attendance: 12,350; Referee: Bojan Pandžić

16 September 2017 Round 23	IFK Göteborg	1–1	Jönköpings Södra IF	Gothenburg
14:00	Karlsson Lagemyr 53'	Report	Kozica 16'	Stadium: Gamla Ullevi; Attendance: 9,142; Referee: Kristoffer Karlsson

20 September 2017 Round 24	Hammarby IF	2–1	IFK Göteborg	Malmö
19:00	Bakircioglu 58'; Svendsen 61'	Report	Diskerud 54'	Stadium: Tele2 Arena; Attendance: 20,650; Referee: Mohammed Al-Hakim

25 September 2017 Round 25	AFC Eskilstuna	1–0	IFK Göteborg	Eskilstuna
19:00	Omeje 86'	Report		Stadium: Tunavallen; Attendance: 4,157; Referee: Kristoffer Karlsson

29 September 2017 Round 26	IFK Göteborg	4–0	IK Sirius	Gothenburg
19:00	Diskerud 15'; Erlingmark 37'; Hysén 61'; Boman 64'	Report		Stadium: Gamla Ullevi; Attendance: 7,814; Referee: Glenn Nyberg

14 October 2017 Round 27	Halmstads BK	1–2	IFK Göteborg	Halmstad
14:00	Silfwer 25' (pen.)	Report	Erlingmark 53'; Boman 89'	Stadium: Örjans Vall; Attendance: 4,307; Referee: Johan Hamlin

22 October 2017 Round 28	IFK Göteborg	0–1	Östersunds FK	Gothenburg
15:00		Report	Fritzson 8'	Stadium: Gamla Ullevi; Attendance: 9,263; Referee: Bojan Pandžić

30 October 2017 Round 29	AIK	2–1	IFK Göteborg	Halmstad
19:00	Obasi 8'; Lindkvist 45+1'	Report	Sakor 72'	Stadium: Örjans Vall; Attendance: 19,870; Referee: Kristoffer Karlsson

5 November 2017 Round 30	IFK Göteborg	0–3	GIF Sundsvall	Gothenburg
15:00		Report	Myrestam 36'; Wilson 40'; Hallenius 66'	Stadium: Gamla Ullevi; Attendance: 6,769; Referee: Stefan Johannesson

=== Svenska Cupen ===
==== 2016–17 ====
The tournament continued from the 2016 season.

Kickoff times are in UTC+1.

===== Group stage =====
Pos	Team	Pld	W	D	L	GF	GA	GD	Pts	Qualification	IFKG	IKS	LSK	ASIF
1	IFK Göteborg	3	2	1	0	11	4	+7	7	Advance to Knockout stage	—	2–2	3–2	—
2	IK Sirius	3	2	1	0	9	2	+7	7		—	—	2–0	—
3	Ljungskile SK	3	1	0	2	4	5	−1	3		—	—	—	2–0
4	Arameiska-Syrianska IF	3	0	0	3	0	13	−13	0		0–6	0–5	—	—

Source: Swedish Football Association
Rules for classification: 1) Points; 2) Goal difference; 3) Goals scored; 4) Head-to-head record; 5) Highest ranked team

18 February 2017 Matchday 1	IFK Göteborg	3–2	Ljungskile SK	Gothenburg
16:00	Rieks 7'; Ómarsson 35'; Rogne 38'	Report	Strömberg 50'; Gustafsson 56'	Stadium: Bravida Arena; Attendance: 2,221; Referee: Robert Daradić

26 February 2017 Matchday 2	IFK Göteborg	6–0	Arameisk-Syrianska IF	Gothenburg
16:00	Boman 7'; Rieks 26', 36', 48'; Salomonsson 83'; Boo Wiklander 86'	Report		Stadium: Bravida Arena; Attendance: 1,281; Referee: Kaspar Sjöberg

4 March 2017 Matchday 3	IFK Göteborg	2–2	IK Sirius	Gothenburg
16:00	Boman 2'; Rogne 61'	Report	Bergman 73', 86'	Stadium: Bravida Arena; Attendance: 2,325; Referee: Stefan Johannesson

===== Knockout stage =====
11 March 2017 Quarter-finals	IFK Göteborg	1–2	IFK Norrköping	Gothenburg
18:30	Boman 80'	Report	Holmberg 56', 68'	Stadium: Ullevi; Attendance: 2,470; Referee: Mohammed Al-Hakim

==== 2017–18 ====
The tournament continued into the 2018 season.

===== Qualification stage =====
23 August 2017 Round 2	Landvetter IS	0–5	IFK Göteborg	Landvetter
18:30 UTC+2		Report	Ohlsson 27'; Ómarsson 50', 57', 69'; Nordström 55'	Stadium: Landvetter IP; Attendance: 4,800; Referee: Bojan Pandžić

== Non-competitive ==
=== Pre-season ===
Kickoff times are in UTC+1 unless stated otherwise.

28 January 2017 Friendly	IFK Göteborg (Sweden)	0–1	(Norway) Sarpsborg 08	Gothenburg, Sweden
15:00		Report	Mortensen 52'	Stadium: Prioritet Serneke Arena; Attendance: 2,011; Referee: Bojan Pandžić

1 February 2017 Friendly	IFK Göteborg (Sweden)	3–1	(Norway) Sandefjord	Gothenburg, Sweden
16:00	Hysén 18', 24', 69'	Report	Kastrati 14'	Stadium: Prioritet Serneke Arena; Attendance: 842; Referee: Magnus Lindgren

7 February 2017 The Dubai International Cup	IFK Göteborg (Sweden)	2–2 (5–3 p)	(Denmark) Brøndby IF	Dubai, United Arab Emirates
12:00 UTC+4	Rieks 33'; Ómarsson 90'	Report	Pukki 15'; Wilczek 44'	Stadium: JA Centre of Excellence; Attendance: 63; Referee: Ahmed Salem (United Arab Emirates)
	Penalties
	Ohlsson (penalty scored); Ómarsson (penalty scored); Erlingmark (penalty scored); Bjärsmyr (penalty scored); Salomonsson (penalty scored)		(penalty missed) Corlu; (penalty scored) Austin; (penalty scored) Nilsson; (penalty scored) Hermannsson

11 February 2017 The Dubai International Cup	IFK Göteborg	2–1	AIK	Dubai, United Arab Emirates
16:00 UTC+4	Boman 2'; Hysén 86'	Report	Affane 12'	Stadium: JA Centre of Excellence; Attendance: 109; Referee: Adel Al Nagabi (United Arab Emirates)

18 March 2017 Friendly	IFK Göteborg	1–1	Kalmar FF	Gothenburg, Sweden
15:00	Rieks 75'	Report	Ingelsson 29'	Stadium: Ullevi; Attendance: 783; Referee: Antti Kanerva

23 March 2017 Friendly	IFK Göteborg	1–0	Falkenbergs FF	Gothenburg, Sweden
16:00	Hysén 39'	Report		Stadium: Hjällbovallen; Attendance: 363; Referee: Magnus Lindgren

=== Mid-season ===
27 June 2017 Friendly	FK Žalgiris (Lithuania)	3–1	(Sweden) IFK Göteborg	Vilnius, Lithuania
21:00 UTC+3	Elivelto 27'; Šernas 61'; Antal 90'	Report	Hysén 16'	Stadium: LFF Stadium; Attendance: 4,873; Referee: Manfredas Lukjančukas (Lithuania)
