= Miiko Albornoz =

Swedish-born Chilean footballer (born 1990)

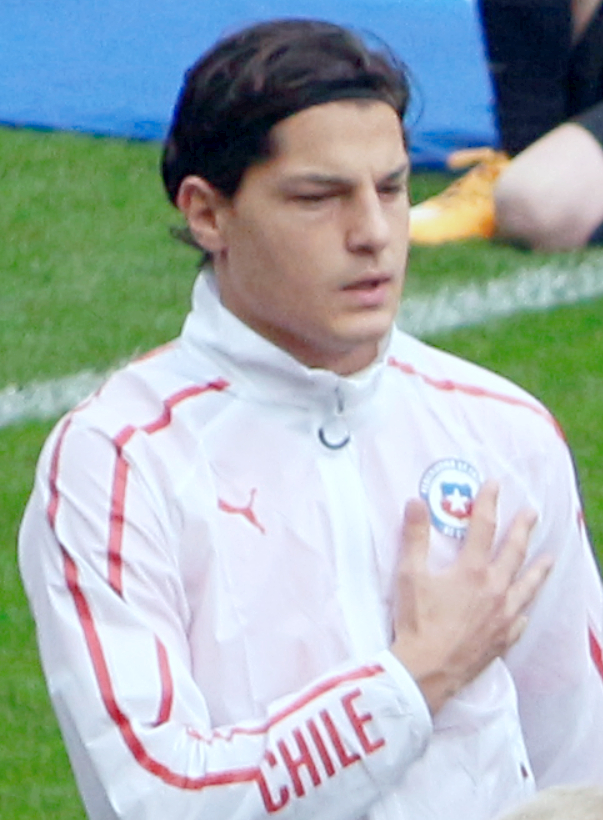
- Albornoz with Chile in 2015

Personal information
- Full name: Miiko Martín Albornoz Inola
- Date of birth: 30 November 1990 (age 35)
- Place of birth: Stockholm, Sweden
- Height: 1.80 m (5 ft 11 in)
- Position: Left-back

Team information
- Current team: Essinge IK

Youth career
- 1994–2007: IF Brommapojkarna

Senior career*
Years	Team	Apps	(Gls)
2007–2011	IF Brommapojkarna	82	(9)
2011–2014	Malmö FF	68	(4)
2014–2020	Hannover 96	129	(1)
2021	Colo-Colo	9	(0)
2022–2025	Vejle	74	(3)
2026–	Essinge IK	–	(–)

International career
2005–2007	Sweden U17	14	(0)
2007–2009	Sweden U19	13	(0)
2009–2012	Sweden U21	11	(0)
2014–2019	Chile	14	(2)
Medal record
Men's football
Representing Chile
Copa América
Winner	2015 Chile
- * Club domestic league appearances and goals as of 29 May 2025

Miiko Martín Albornoz Inola (Latin American Spanish: [ˈmiko alβoɾˈnos]; born 30 November 1990) is a professional footballer who plays as a left-back for Essinge IK. Born in Sweden, he played for the Chile national team.

Albornoz started his professional career with IF Brommapojkarna before joining Malmö FF with whom he won the 2013 and 2014 Allsvenskan titles. He then moved on to play in Germany for Hannover 96. A youth player for Sweden, he opted to play his senior international football for Chile and was a part of Chile's 2014 World Cup and 2015 Copa América squads.

== Club career ==
=== Brommapojkarna ===
Albornoz began his career at four years of age at IF Brommapojkarna where he played his way through various youth teams before he joined the first team in 2007. He played his first match in 2008 in Superettan, the second tier of the Swedish football league system. He played his first Allsvenskan match in 2009.

=== Malmö FF ===
Albornoz signed a four-year contract with Swedish champions Malmö FF on 14 August 2011. At Malmö FF, he inherited the number 14 shirt from Guillermo Molins, who departed during the same transfer window. He was presented as the club's new player in front of a crowd of 23,180 at Swedbank Stadion before an exhibition game against A.C. Milan. Albornoz made his debut for the club in a 2–1 win over GAIS in Allsvenskan on 20 August 2011. In total Albornoz played six league matches in Malmö FF for his first season at the club and also got to play for the club in the 2011–12 UEFA Europa League group stage.

For the 2012 season, Albornoz played much of the pre-season as right-back, even though he is left-footed and had never before played to the right. Against Syrianska FC on 23 April, he started as right-back and played 90 minutes. Albornoz continued to play at the position for the following games, replacing Ulrich Vinzents who had been the starting player at the position since 2006. Albornoz played one of his best games for Malmö FF at home against AIK on 2 July when he was awarded the man of the match award. On 27 August Albornoz scored his first goal for the club, a hard volley shot from outside the penalty area, for Malmö FF in a home fixture against GIF Sundsvall. Albornoz played 27 matches and scored three goals in total for Malmö FF in 2012.

Albornoz changed from the number 14 jersey to number 3 ahead of the 2013 season. On 22 April 2013, he made his first appearance for the season after his suspension in a home fixture against Östers IF. He went on to play in all of the club's remaining league matches and scoring one goal in the title winning season where he played a major role. Albornoz also played all of Malmö FF's matches in the qualification stage for the 2013–14 UEFA Europa League. He was nominated as defender of the year for the 2013 Allsvenskan for his overall performance during the season.

During the 2014 season Albornoz played nine out of twelve possible matches before the 2014 FIFA World Cup and his transfer to Hannover. He also played all of the matches for the club in the 2013–14 Svenska Cupen campaign where the club progressed to the semi-finals. Malmö eventually went on to win a second straight Allsvenskan title only a few months following Albornoz' departure.

=== Hannover 96 ===
On 20 June 2014, the transfer of Albornoz to the German Bundesliga club Hannover was officially announced. The transfer was completed on 1 July 2014 when the German transfer window opened. Albornoz was in Brazil with the Chile national team for the 2014 FIFA World Cup at the time of the transfer.

=== Colo-Colo ===
In March 2021, free agent Albornoz joined Chilean Primera División club Colo-Colo. The club later decided not to renew his contract in December of the same year.

=== Late career ===
Following Vejle, Albornoz trained with Europa Point from Gibraltar.

Back to Sweden, Albornoz joined Essinge IK under his older brother, Mauricio.

== International career ==
=== Sweden ===
Between 2005 and 2013, Albornoz was a regular youth international for Sweden. He played in all youth categories, from under-17s to under-21s. In December 2013, Erik Hamren called Albornoz to be part of the senior squad, to play friendlies in the Middle East. Albornoz rejected the call-up choosing instead to wait to be nominated to play for Chile.

=== Chile ===
In December 2013, Albornoz stated to Chilean media that he was able to play for Chile in a friendly against Germany on 5 March. But Jorge Sampaoli called Albornoz for a friendly against Costa Rica, on 22 January. He rejected Sweden in favour of Chile to have a chance to play in the 2014 FIFA World Cup. Albornoz earned his first international cap against Costa Rica, on 22 January, scoring the opening goal in a 4–0 victory. On 13 May 2014, Albornoz was called for the provisional 30-man squad for the World Cup. Albornoz earned his second cap against Egypt, and on the following day, he was confirmed on the 23-man squad that played in Brazil. Although Chile reached the round of 16, Albornoz didn't play in any match.

== Personal life ==
His father is Chilean and his mother is of Finnish descent. His older brother Mauricio is also a professional footballer.

=== Statutory rape ===
On 8 January 2013, it was made official that Albornoz was being charged with statutory rape for having had sexual relations with a 14-year-old girl on 8 November 2012 in Malmö. Albornoz was detained and arrested for the offence on 17 November 2012, but was released after three days. Albornoz admitted that he was aware of the girl's age at the time of the act. Media reported that the relationship was mutually consensual and that no violence or force had occurred during the act. Malmö FF published a press release the same day stating that Albornoz would take a time-out from all activities with the club until further notice.

Albornoz was found guilty and was given a suspended sentence in the trial held on 12 February 2013. As a result of the conviction Malmö FF announced a two-month extension of the time-out, but that Albornoz would be allowed to train with the squad during this period. They also announced that a new decision regarding the player's situation would be taken at the end of this period. On 10 April 2013, Malmö FF held a press conference and announced that Albornoz's time-out was now over and that he would be available for squad selection once again for the Allsvenskan match against Östers IF on 22 April 2013. Albornoz was unavailable for play in the group stage of the 2012–13 Svenska Cupen which was held in March 2013 as well as the four opening fixtures of the 2013 Allsvenskan season.

== Career statistics ==
=== Club ===
As of 19 January 2022

Appearances and goals by club, season and competition
Club	Season	League			Cup		Continental		Total	
Club	Season	Division	Apps	Goals	Apps	Goals	Apps	Goals	Apps	Goals
Brommapojkarna	2007	Allsvenskan	0	0	—		—		0	0
Brommapojkarna	2008	Superettan	16	6	—		—		16	6
Brommapojkarna	2009	Allsvenskan	29	1	—		—		29	1
Brommapojkarna	2010	Allsvenskan	18	0	0	0	—		18	0
Brommapojkarna	2011	Superettan	19	2	3	0	—		22	2
Brommapojkarna	Total		82	9	3	0	—		85	9
Malmö FF	2011	Allsvenskan	6	0	0	0	2	0	8	0
Malmö FF	2012	Allsvenskan	27	3	1	0	—		28	3
Malmö FF	2013	Allsvenskan	26	1	0	0	6	1	32	2
Malmö FF	2014	Allsvenskan	9	0	5	0	0	0	14	0
Malmö FF	Total		68	4	6	0	8	1	82	5
Hannover 96	2014–15	Bundesliga	28	0	1	0	—		29	0
Hannover 96	2015–16	Bundesliga	23	0	2	0	—		25	0
Hannover 96	2016–17	2. Bundesliga	27	0	0	0	—		27	0
Hannover 96	2017–18	Bundesliga	10	0	1	0	—		11	0
Hannover 96	2018–19	Bundesliga	22	1	1	0	—		23	1
Hannover 96	2019–20	2. Bundesliga	19	0	0	0	—		19	0
Hannover 96	Total		129	1	5	0	0	0	134	0
Colo-Colo	2021	Chilean Primera División	9	0	0	0	—		9	0
Career total			288	14	14	0	8	1	310	15

=== International ===
As of 15 October 2019

Appearances and goals by national team and year
National team	Year	Apps	Goals
Chile	2014	4	1
Chile	2015	4	0
Chile	2016	0	0
Chile	2017	0	0
Chile	2018	5	1
Chile	2019	1	0
Total		14	2

As of 8 June 2018
Scores and results list Chile's goal tally first, score column indicates score after each Albornoz goal.

List of international goals scored by Miiko Albornoz
No.	Date	Venue	Opponent	Score	Result	Competition
1	22 January 2014	Estadio Municipal Francisco Sánchez Rumoroso, Coquimbo, Chile	Costa Rica	1–0	4–0	Friendly
2	8 June 2018	INEA Stadion, Poznań, Poland	Poland	2–2	2–2	Friendly

== Honours ==
Malmö

- Allsvenskan: 2013, 2014
- Svenska Supercupen: 2013

Colo-Colo

- Copa Chile: 2021

Vejle

- Danish 1st Division: 2022–23

Chile

- Copa América: 2015
