= Emil Salomonsson =

Swedish footballer (born 1989)

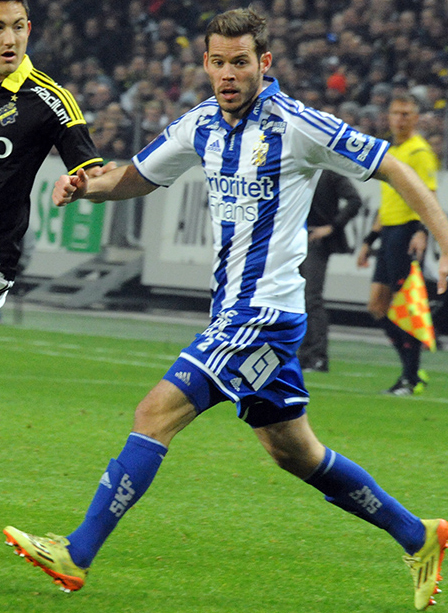

Personal information
- Full name: Karl Emil Salomonsson
- Date of birth: 28 April 1989 (age 37)
- Place of birth: Örkelljunga, Sweden
- Height: 1.81 m (5 ft 11 in)
- Position: Right-back

Youth career
- –2003: Ekets GoIF
- 2004–2006: Ängelholms FF

Senior career*
Years	Team	Apps	(Gls)
2006–2007	Ängelholms FF		
2008–2011	Halmstads BK	81	(5)
2008	→ Ängelholms FF (loan)	28	(9)
2011–2018	IFK Göteborg	201	(20)
2019–2020	Sanfrecce Hiroshima	19	(2)
2020	→ Avispa Fukuoka (loan)	39	(2)
2021	Avispa Fukuoka	32	(3)
2022–2024	IFK Göteborg	64	(3)
2025	Ekets GoIF	1	(0)
Total		465	(44)

International career
2006	Sweden U17	3	(0)
2007–2008	Sweden U19	10	(1)
2009–2010	Sweden U21	10	(0)
2011–2017	Sweden	8	(1)
- * Club domestic league appearances and goals

Karl Emil Salomonsson (born 28 April 1989) is a Swedish former professional footballer who played as a right-back.

== Career ==
=== Early career ===
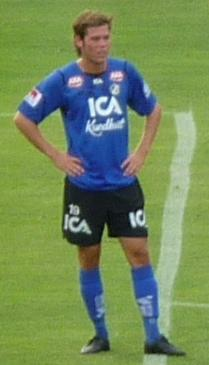
Salomonsson playing for Halmstad in 2009.

Starting his career in Ekets GoIF, he then moved to Ängelholms FF in 2004. During the 2006 season in Division 1 he gained the interest from three clubs in Allsvenskan, IFK Göteborg, Helsingborgs IF and Halmstads BK, he went on trial with all three and eventually signed for Halmstads BK, however he was directly loaned back to Ängelholms FF where he would stay until 1 July, he could then return to Halmstads BK, but Halmstad let him stay for the rest of the season. The main part of the 2009 season he was used as a right wing defender, however in the game against Kalmar FF on 9 August he played as forward.

=== IFK Göteborg ===
On 30 August 2011, it was confirmed that Salomonsson had signed for Allsvenskan rivals IFK Göteborg. During his first time in IFK Göteborg, he played a small role and acted as back-up for Adam Johansson. However, when Johansson left the club, he became the first-choice right back and in the 2012 season he played 27 matches when IFK finished in 7th place. Before the start of the 2013, he wasn't the first-choice anymore with the comeback of Adam Johansson, the arrival of Ludwig Augustinsson and Mikael Dyrestam already being in the squad. However, because of injuries, he played 28 matches that season, most of them as defender, but some as a right winger. In the 2014 season, he once again started the season as the second-choice, but in the summer the reclaimed his place in the starting-eleven and he was a big contributor to IFK once again qualified for UEFA Europa League qualification. On 30 September 2014, he signed a new contract, keeping him at the club until the end of the 2018 season.

=== Sanfrecce Hiroshima ===
He scored his first goal for Sanfrecce Hiroshima on his J1 League debut against Shimizu S-Pulse on 23 February 2019.

=== Avispa Fukuoka ===
On 7 January 2020, he was loaned from Sanfrecce Hiroshima to Avispa Fukuoka in the J2 League. From the start of the season, he was a regular in the team and played in 39 of the 42 league games. He quickly became one of the team's most popular players thanks to his athleticism and precision, while his personality earned him the respect of the fans. His performances helped Avispa Fukuoka to finish second in the league and gain promotion to J1 League. On 6 January 2021, he announced the end of his loan and his transfer to Fukuoka. In the 2021 season, he scored three goals in 32 league games and two goals in the J.League Cup. His performances helped Avispa Fukuoka to a record 8th place finish in J1 League.

=== Return to IFK Göteborg ===
On 10 December 2021, it was announced that Salomonsson would return to IFK Göteborg on a free transfer. He signed a three-year contract.

== Career statistics ==
=== Club ===
Appearances and goals by club, season and competition
Club	Season	League			Cup		League Cup		Continental		Total	
Club	Season	Division	Apps	Goals	Apps	Goals	Apps	Goals	Apps	Goals	Apps	Goals
Ängelholms FF (loan)	2008	Superettan	28	9	0	0	—		—		28	9
Ängelholms FF (loan)	Total		28	9	0	0	0	0	0	0	28	9
Halmstads BK	2009	Allsvenskan	28	0	1	0	—		—		29	0
Halmstads BK	2010	Allsvenskan	30	1	1	0	—		—		31	1
Halmstads BK	2011	Allsvenskan	23	4	2	0	—		—		25	4
Halmstads BK	Total		81	5	4	0	0	0	0	0	85	5
IFK Göteborg	2011	Allsvenskan	6	1	1	0	—		—		7	1
IFK Göteborg	2012	Allsvenskan	27	0	1	2	—		—		28	2
IFK Göteborg	2013	Allsvenskan	28	0	6	0	—		2	0	36	0
IFK Göteborg	2014	Allsvenskan	24	3	2	0	—		3	0	29	3
IFK Göteborg	2015	Allsvenskan	30	5	7	2	—		4	0	41	7
IFK Göteborg	2016	Allsvenskan	29	7	2	0	—		7	2	38	9
IFK Göteborg	2017	Allsvenskan	28	3	5	1	—		—		33	4
IFK Göteborg	2018	Allsvenskan	29	1	4	0	—		—		33	1
IFK Göteborg	Total		201	20	28	5	0	0	16	2	245	27
Sanfrecce Hiroshima	2019	J1 League	19	2	2	0	1	0	4	0	26	2
Sanfrecce Hiroshima	Total		19	2	2	0	1	0	4	0	26	2
Avispa Fukuoka (loan)	2020	J2 League	39	2	—		—		—		39	2
Avispa Fukuoka (loan)	Total		39	2	0	0	0	0	0	0	39	2
Avispa Fukuoka	2021	J1 League	32	3	0	0	2	0	—		34	3
Avispa Fukuoka	Total		32	3	2	0	2	0	0	0	34	3
IFK Göteborg	2022	Allsvenskan	23	1	3	1	—		—		26	2
IFK Göteborg	2023	Allsvenskan	0	0	0	0	—		—		0	0
IFK Göteborg	Total		23	1	3	1	0	0	0	0	26	2
Career total			423	42	37	6	2	0	20	2	483	50

=== International ===
Appearances and goals by national team and year
National team	Year	Apps	Goals
Sweden	2011	1	0
Sweden	2012	2	0
Sweden	2013	0	0
Sweden	2014	0	0
Sweden	2015	0	0
Sweden	2016	3	1
Sweden	2017	2	0
Total		8	1

International goals

Scores and results list Sweden's goal tally first.

Goal	Date	Venue	Opponent	Score	Result	Competition	Ref
1.	10 January 2016	Armed Forces Stadium, Abu Dhabi, United Arab Emirates	Finland	1–0	3–0	Friendly	

== Honours ==
IFK Göteborg

- Svenska Cupen: 2012–13, 2014–15

Individual

- Archangel of the Year (IFK Göteborg player of the year): 2014
