= Åsljunga =

Locality in Sweden

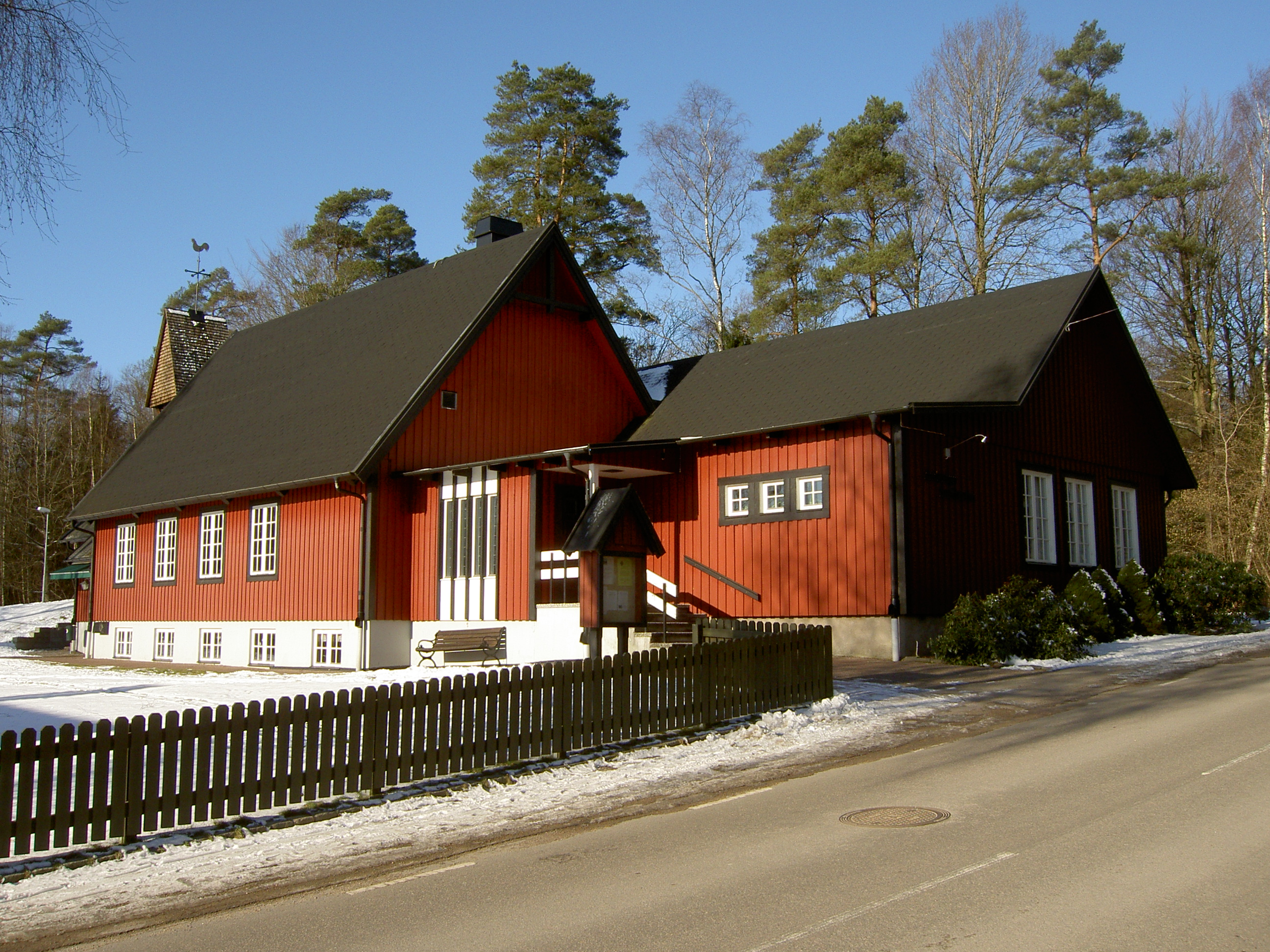

- Location within Skåne Location within Sweden
- Coordinates: 56°19′N 13°22′E
- Country: Sweden
- Province: Skåne
- County: Skåne County
- Municipality: Örkelljunga Municipality

Area
  - Total: 1.08 km^{2} (0.42 sq mi)

Population (31 December 2010)
  - Total: 659
  - Density: 611/km^{2} (1,580/sq mi)
- Time zone: UTC+1 (CET)
  - Summer (DST): UTC+2 (CEST)

Åsljunga is a locality situated in Örkelljunga Municipality, Skåne County, Sweden with 659 inhabitants in 2010.
