= Örkelljunga Municipality =

Örkelljunga Municipality Örkelljunga kommun
- Municipality
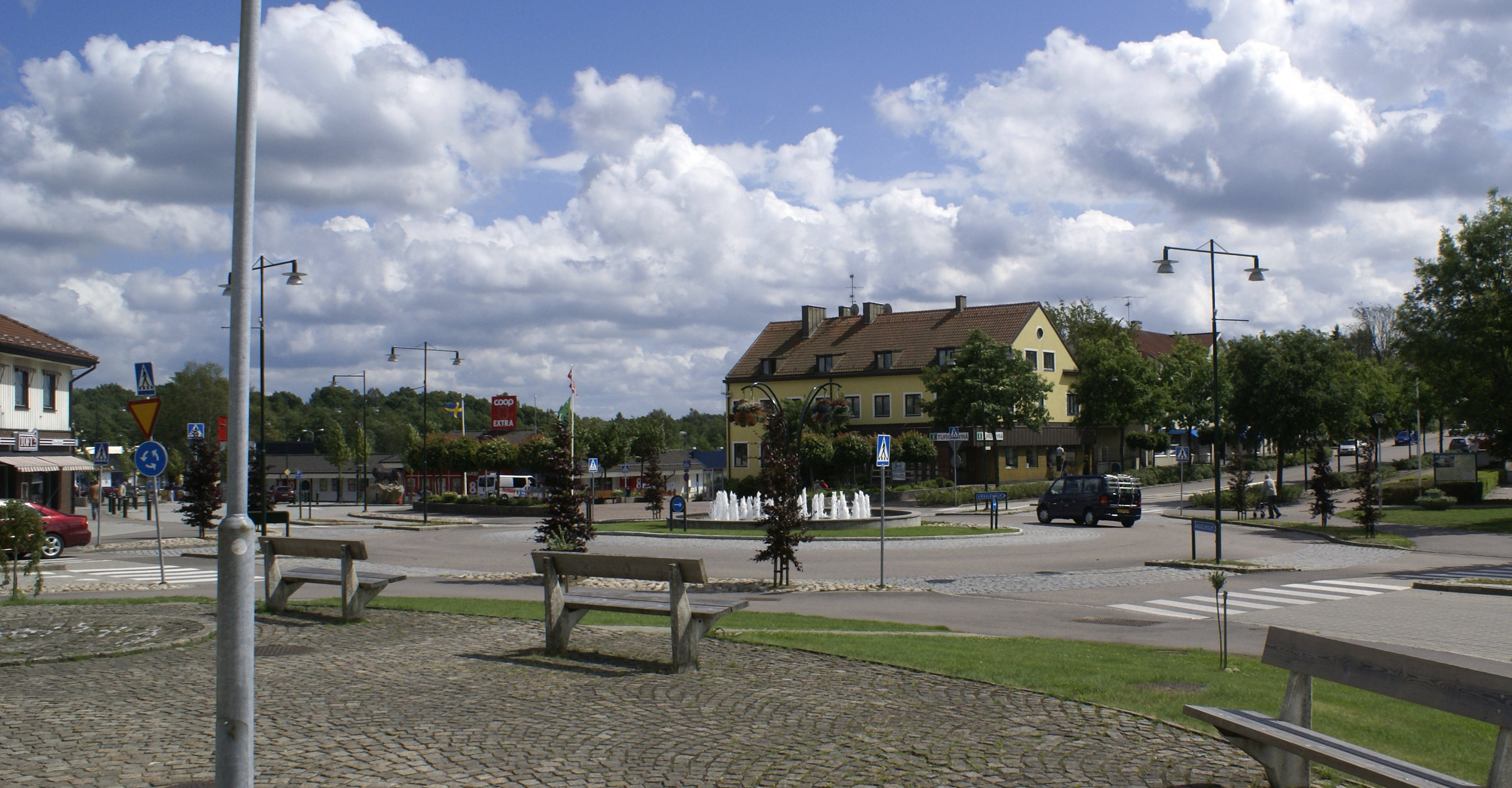

- Flag Coat of arms

- Coordinates: 56°17′N 13°17′E
- Country: Sweden
- County: Skåne County
- Seat: Örkelljunga

Area
  - Total: 329.7 km^{2} (127.3 sq mi)
  - Land: 319.55 km^{2} (123.38 sq mi)
  - Water: 10.15 km^{2} (3.92 sq mi)
- Area as of 1 January 2014.

Population (30 June 2025)
  - Total: 10,277
  - Density: 32.161/km^{2} (83.296/sq mi)
- Time zone: UTC+1 (CET)
  - Summer (DST): UTC+2 (CEST)
- ISO 3166 code: SE
- Province: Scania
- Municipal code: 1257
- Website: www.orkelljunga.se

Örkelljunga Municipality (Swedish: Örkelljunga kommun) is a municipality in Skåne County in southern Sweden. Its seat is located in the town Örkelljunga.

The present municipality was formed in 1971 through the amalgamation of "old" Örkelljunga with Skånes-Fagerhult.

In sports, there is one team of national recognition and the pride of the town: Örkelljunga Volleybollklubb. Usually both the male and female teams are top contestant in the highest national league; having won it on several occasions. Within the municipal borders is also a renowned golf course.

== Geography ==
Geographically, Örkelljunga Municipality is situated in north-western Scania on the border to the provinces Halland and Småland. These parts of Scania are notable for a varied terrain of leaf woods, farming areas and small lakes.

The closest large city is Helsingborg on the west coast, less than half an hour car drive away.

=== Localities ===
There are 4 urban areas (also called a Tätort or locality) in Örkelljunga Municipality.

In the table they are listed according to the size of the population as of December 31, 2005. The municipal seat is in bold characters.

#	Locality	Population
1	**Örkelljunga**	4,574
2	Skånes-Fagerhult	854
3	Åsljunga	690
4	Eket	448

== Demographics ==
This is a demographic table based on Örkelljunga Municipality's electoral districts in the 2022 Swedish general election sourced from SVT's election platform, in turn taken from SCB official statistics.

In total there were 10,482 residents, including 7,651 Swedish citizens of voting age. 30.7% voted for the left coalition and 67.2% for the right coalition. Indicators are in percentage points except population totals and income.

Location	Residents	Citizen adults	Left vote	Right vote	Employed	Swedish parents	Foreign heritage	Income SEK	Degree
Location			%	%					
Rya	1,034	804	30.1	67.0	77	82	18	25,024	29
Skånes Fagerhult	1,722	1,264	29.1	69.3	76	78	22	21,215	23
Åsljunga	1,357	955	27.1	70.8	76	76	24	24,104	26
Örkelljunga C	1,449	1,094	33.8	64.2	77	75	25	20,862	28
Örkelljunga M	2,510	1,877	30.5	67.4	84	85	15	25,216	32
Örkelljunga N	2,410	1,657	32.7	65.4	72	68	32	20,649	24
Source: SVT
