= Essinge IK =

Swedish football club

- Full name: Essinge Idrottsklubb
- Founded: 1919; 107 years ago
- Ground: Essinge IP; Stockholm; Sweden
- Head coach: Mauricio Albornoz
- League: Division 4 Stockholm C
- 2025: Division 5 Stockholm C, 2nd
Home colours

Essinge IK is a Swedish football club located in Stockholm.

The club currently plays in Division 4 Stockholm C which is the sixth tier of Swedish football.

== Background ==
Essinge Idrottsklubb is a sports club from Stockholm that was founded on 8 June 1919. Over the years the club has mainly been active in team sports such as football, bandy, handball and ice hockey at various levels in the Swedish league systems. The most successful section of the club has been the now defunct bandy team. The club currently only runs a football section.

Since their foundation Essinge IK has participated mainly in the middle and lower divisions of the Swedish football league system. In 2002 Essinge IK merged with Vasalund IF and formed a new team Vasalund/Essinge IF. The merger was discontinued before the 2008 season. Essinge IK continued to play, with a youth team, in the lowest Stockholm leagues during the merger under the name Essinge IK Fotboll. When the alliance with Vasalund was dissolved, Essinge IK once again changed back to their original name.

Essinge IK are affiliated to the Stockholms Fotbollförbund. The club runs a football school for children from the age of six and a range of teams serving boys and girls. In addition there are women's and men's teams. In total there are 300 active players within the club.

The ice hockey team played the 1959/1960 season in the Swedish second division.

== Season to season – Men's ==
Since 1995 Essinge IK (under the names Essinge IK FK, Essinge International FC and Essinge IK Fotboll) have competed in the following divisions:

Season	Level	Division	Section	Position	Movements
1995	Tier 6	Division 5			Essinge IK FK – Promoted
1996	Tier 5	Division 4	Stockholm Mellersta	8th	Essinge IK FK
1997	Tier 5	Division 4	Stockholm Mellersta	9th	Essinge IK FK
1998	Tier 5	Division 4	Stockholm Mellersta	9th	Essinge IK FK
1999	Tier 5	Division 4	Stockholm Mellersta	1st	Essinge IK FK – Promoted
2000	Tier 4	Division 3	Östra Svealand	1st	Essinge IK FK – Promoted
2001	Tier 3	Division 2	Östra Svealand	4th	Essinge IK FK
2002	Tier 3	Division 2	Östra Svealand	6th	Essinge International FC
2003	Tier 9	Division 8	Stockholm H	5th	Essinge IK Fotboll
2004	Tier 9	Division 8	Stockholm D	6th	Essinge IK Fotboll
2005	Tier 9	Division 8	Stockholm D	4th	Essinge IK Fotboll
2006*	Tier 9	Division 7	Stockholm D	9th	Essinge IK Fotboll
2007	Tier 9	Division 7	Stockholm D	7th	Essinge IK Fotboll
2008	Tier 9	Division 7	Stockholm D	2nd	Essinge IK Fotboll – Promoted
2009	Tier 8	Division 6	Stockholm C	4th	Essinge IK Fotboll
2010	Tier 8	Division 6	Stockholm C	6th	Essinge IK Fotboll
2011	Tier 8	Division 6	Stockholm C	7th	Essinge IK Fotboll
2012	Tier 8	Division 6	Stockholm C	8th	Essinge IK Fotboll
2013	Tier 8	Division 6	Stockholm C	7th	Essinge IK Fotboll
2014	Tier 8	Division 6	Stockholm C	3rd	Essinge IK Fotboll
2015	Tier 8	Division 6	Stockholm C	4th	Essinge IK Fotboll
2016	Tier 8	Division 6	Herrar 6 F	4th	Essinge IK Fotboll
2017	Tier 8	Division 6	Herrar 6 F	2nd	Essinge IK Fotboll – Promoted
2018	Tier 7	Division 5	Herrar 5 Södra	7th	Essinge IK Fotboll

* League restructuring in 2006 resulted in a new division being created at Tier 3 and subsequent divisions dropping a level.

During the period 2003 to 2007 Essinge IK (under the name Vasalund/Essinge IF) merged with Vasalund IF and competed in the following divisions:

Season	Level	Division	Section	Position	Movements
2003	Tier 3	Division 2	Östra Svealand	7th	Vasalund/Essinge IF
2004	Tier 3	Division 2	Östra Svealand	2nd	Vasalund/Essinge IF
2005	Tier 3	Division 2	Östra Svealand	2nd	Vasalund/Essinge IF – Promoted
2006*	Tier 3	Division 1	Norra	4th	Vasalund/Essinge IF
2007	Tier 3	Division 1	Norra	3rd	Vasalund/Essinge IF

* League restructuring in 2006 resulted in a new division being created at Tier 3 and subsequent divisions dropping a level.
