= Eket, Sweden =

Eket
- Location within Skåne Location within Sweden
- Coordinates: 56°15′N 13°11′E
- Country: Sweden
- Province: Skåne
- County: Skåne County
- Municipality: Örkelljunga Municipality

Area
  - Total: 0.75 km^{2} (0.29 sq mi)

Population (31 December 2010)
  - Total: 409
  - Density: 549/km^{2} (1,420/sq mi)
- Time zone: UTC+1 (CET)
  - Summer (DST): UTC+2 (CEST)

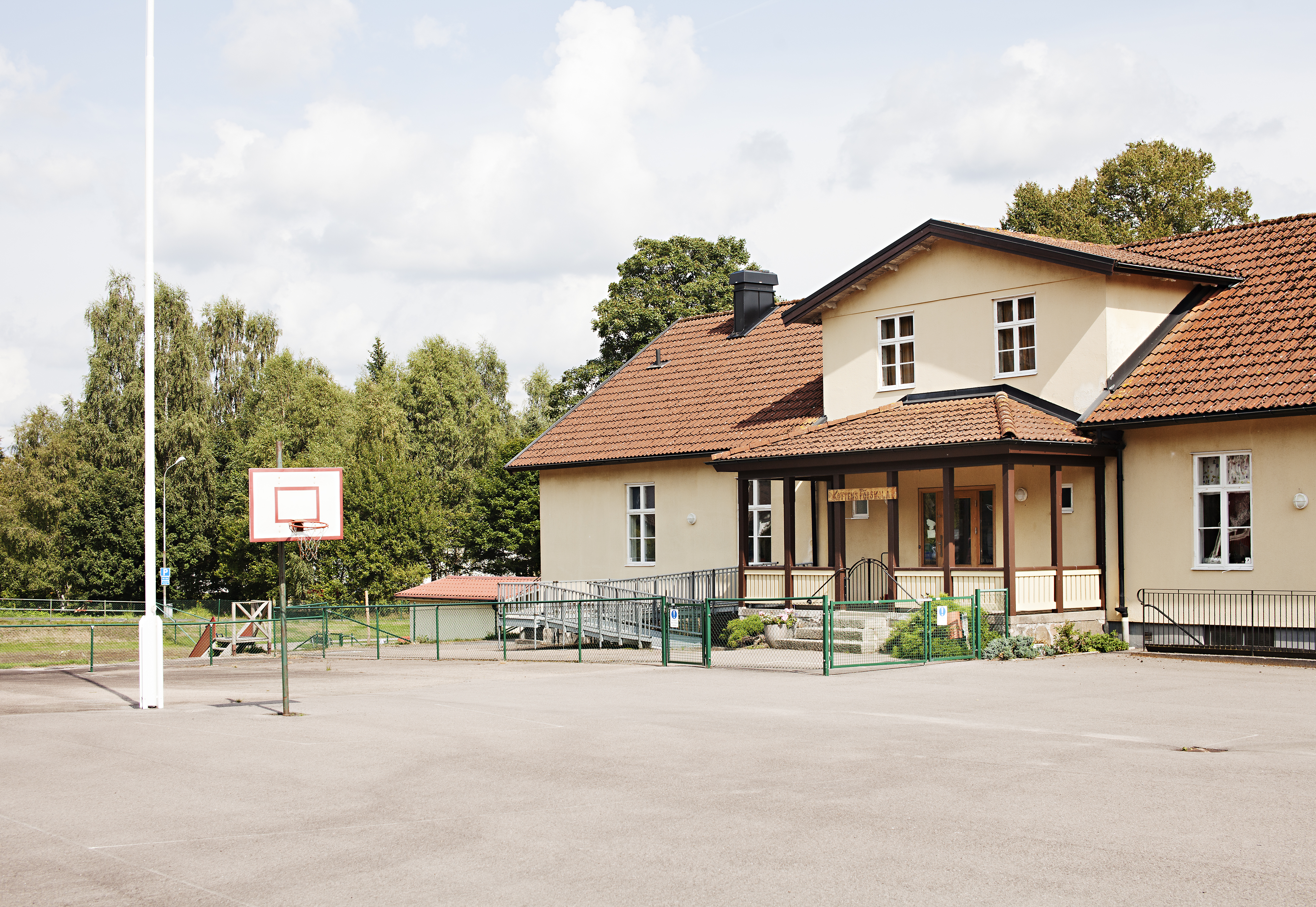
School in Eket

Eket (Swedish pronunciation: [ˈêːkɛt]) is a locality situated in Örkelljunga Municipality, Skåne County, Sweden with 409 inhabitants in 2010.

== Sports ==
The following sports clubs are located in Eket:

- Ekets GoIF
