= Mauricio Albornoz =

Swedish footballer (born 1988)

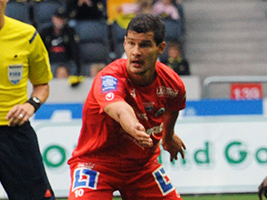

Personal information
- Full name: Anssi Mauricio Albornoz Inola
- Date of birth: 10 March 1988 (age 38)
- Place of birth: Kiruna, Sweden
- Height: 1.83 m (6 ft 0 in)
- Positions: Central midfielder; centre back

Team information
- Current team: Akropolis IF
- Number: 6

Youth career
- –2007: IF Brommapojkarna

Senior career*
Years	Team	Apps	(Gls)
2007–2014	IF Brommapojkarna	159	(22)
2007–2008	→ Gröndals IK (loan)	33	(3)
2015–2017	Åtvidabergs FF	28	(3)
2016	→ IFK Göteborg (loan)	7	(0)
2016	→ GIF Sundsvall (loan)	12	(1)
2017	AFC Eskilstuna	10	(0)
2018	IK Sirius	8	(0)
2019	Syrianska FC	23	(2)
2020–2021	Akropolis IF	49	(2)
2022	IFK Haninge	20	(1)

International career
2009	Sweden U21	1	(0)

Managerial career
- 2023-: Essinge IK
- * Club domestic league appearances and goals as of 20:08, 8 March 2021 (UTC)

Anssi Mauricio Albornoz Inola (born 10 March 1988) is a Swedish footballer who plays for Akropolis IF as a midfielder.

== Personal life ==
Albornoz's father is Chilean and his mother is of Finnish descent. Mauricio has a younger brother, Miiko, who plays for Hannover 96.
