= NORN (clothing brand) =

Canadian clothing manufacturer

NORN is a winter trouser manufacturer based in Montreal, Canada. The insulating fabric for the pants is a special type of fleece. The outer layer is either wool, poly-wool blend or polyester. The combination of the fabrics is chosen such that the pants breathe but also insulates. The main idea is to be warm when outside, while remaining comfortable indoors.

== History ==
NORN was started by Gregory Oganesian, a Montreal engineering student from Concordia University. Riding his motorcycle at close to subzero temperatures, wearing 3 layers and suffering in discomfort, he thought of making a comfortable and warm pair of trousers for the motorcycle. When the prototype was complete, he was amazed by the result and wanted to deliver it to his friends and relative. Then he started selling them online and transitioned to selling to boutiques.

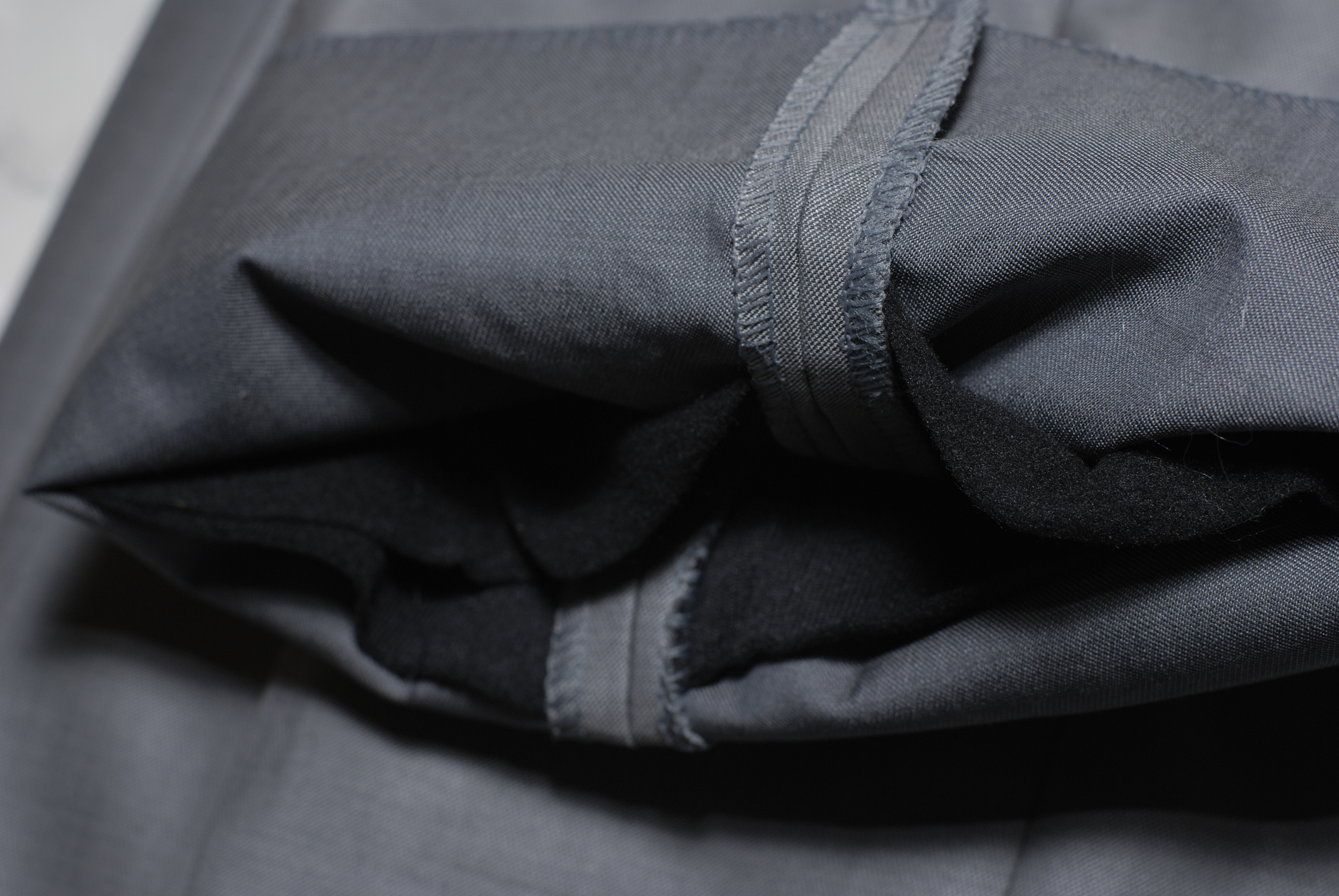
These are the first line of prototype pants
