= Oliver Gustafsson =

Swedish footballer

Personal information
- Full name: Oliver Gustafsson
- Date of birth: 15 May 1993 (age 33)
- Place of birth: Sweden
- Height: 1.90 m (6 ft 3 in)
- Position: Goalkeeper

Team information
- Current team: Utsiktens BK
- Number: 1

Youth career
- 1998–2012: GAIS

Senior career*
Years	Team	Apps	(Gls)
2012–2015	GAIS	2	(0)
2015	→ Torslanda IK (loan)	2	(0)
2016	IFK Göteborg	0	(0)
2016	Ljungskile SK	0	(0)
2017–2018	IK Virgo	3	(0)
2019	GAIS	0	(0)
2021–2022	FC Kålltorp	19	(0)
2023–	Utsiktens BK	10	(0)
- * Club domestic league appearances and goals as of 16 November 2025

Oliver Gustafsson (born 15 May 1993), sometimes spelled Oliver Gustavsson, is a Swedish footballer who plays for Utsiktens BK as a goalkeeper.
