= Örkelljunga =

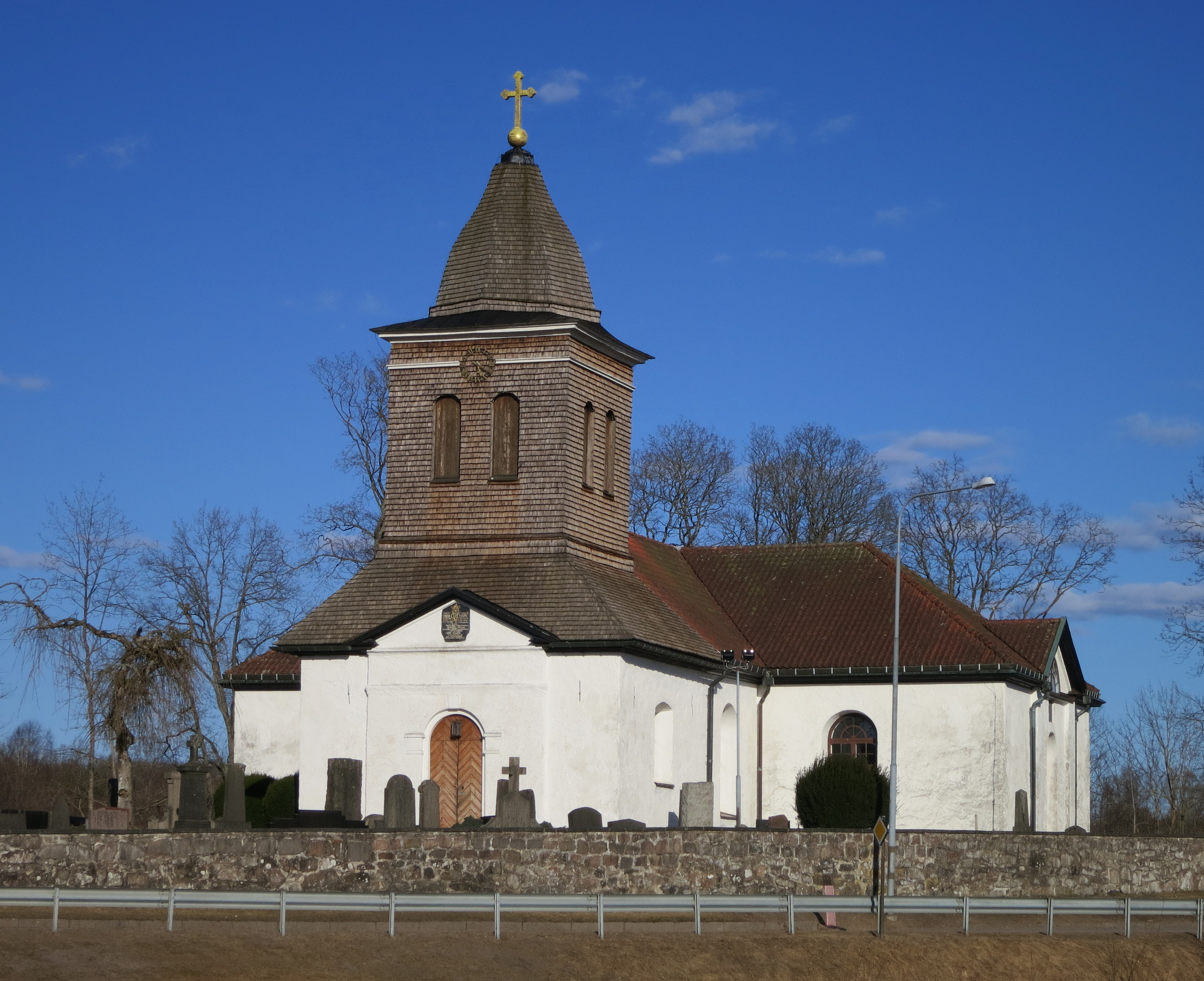
- Örkelljunga Church

- Coat of arms

- Location within Skåne Location within Sweden
- Coordinates: 56°17′N 13°17′E
- Country: Sweden
- Province: Skåne
- County: Skåne County
- Municipality: Örkelljunga Municipality

Area
  - Total: 5.64 km^{2} (2.18 sq mi)

Population (January 2020)
  - Total: 10,300
  - Density: 854/km^{2} (2,210/sq mi)
- Time zone: UTC+1 (CET)
  - Summer (DST): UTC+2 (CEST)

Örkelljunga is a locality and the seat of Örkelljunga Municipality, Skåne County, Sweden with 10,300 inhabitants in 2020.

== History ==
After the municipal reform of 1862, Örkelljunga was part of Örkelljunga Landskommun. In this, Örkelljunga municipal community was established for the town on 4 August 1911 and dissolved on 31 December 1952. Since 1971, the village has been part of Örkelljunga Municipality as a central town.

Between 1928 and 1939 Eiber and Suecia motorcycles were produced here.

== Gallery ==
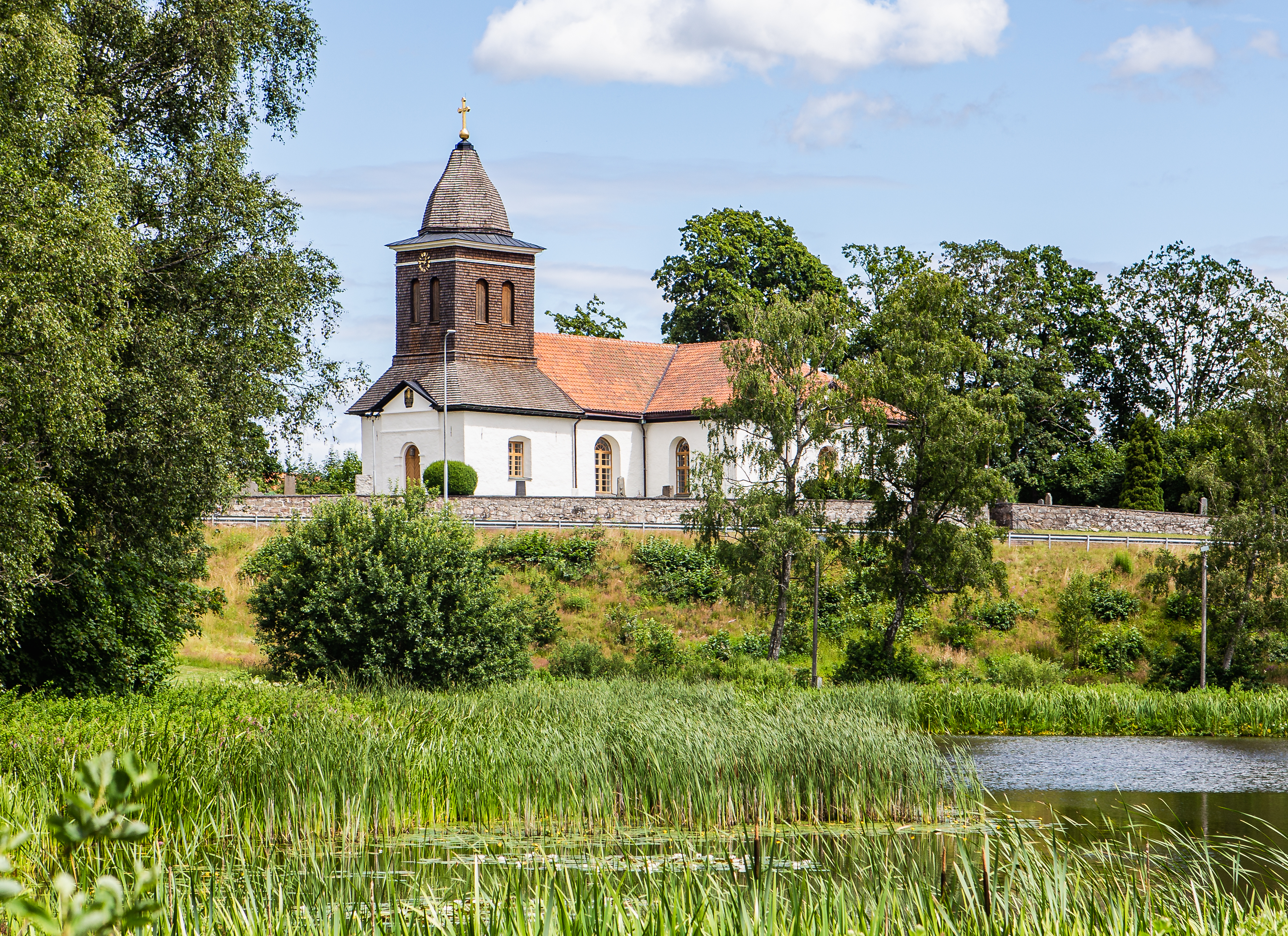
Örkelljunga church

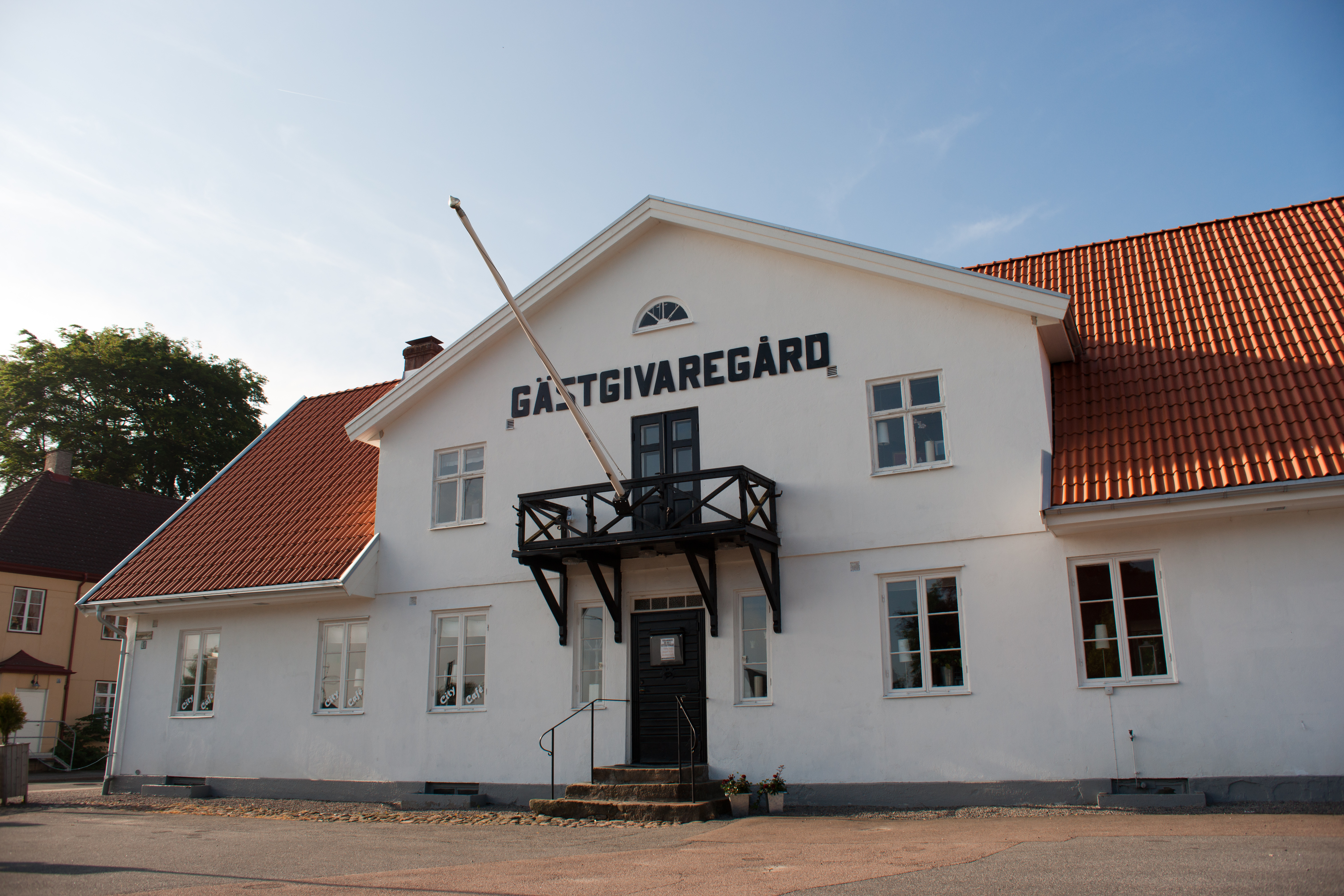
An old inn in central Örkelljunga

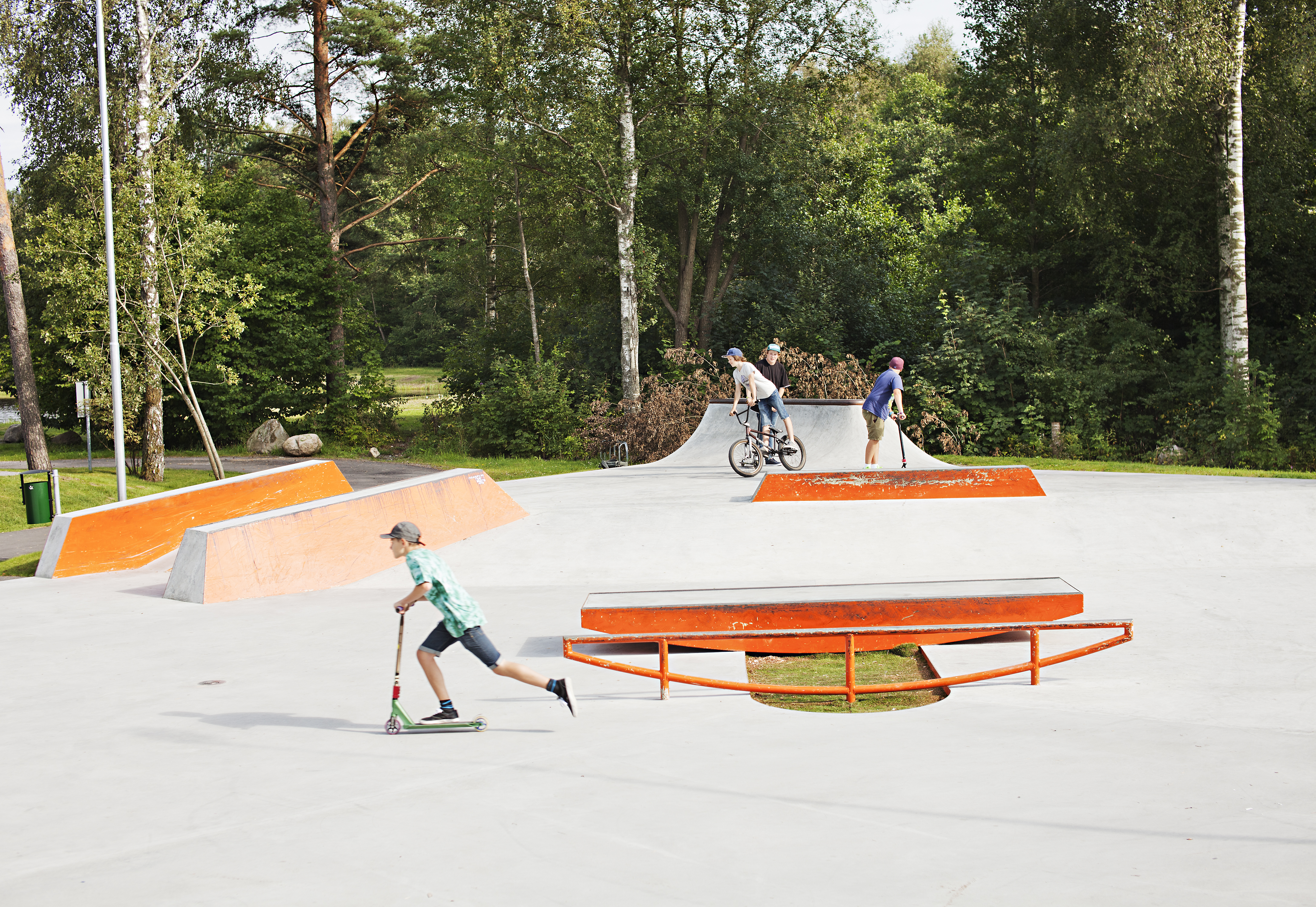
Children playing in Örkelljunga

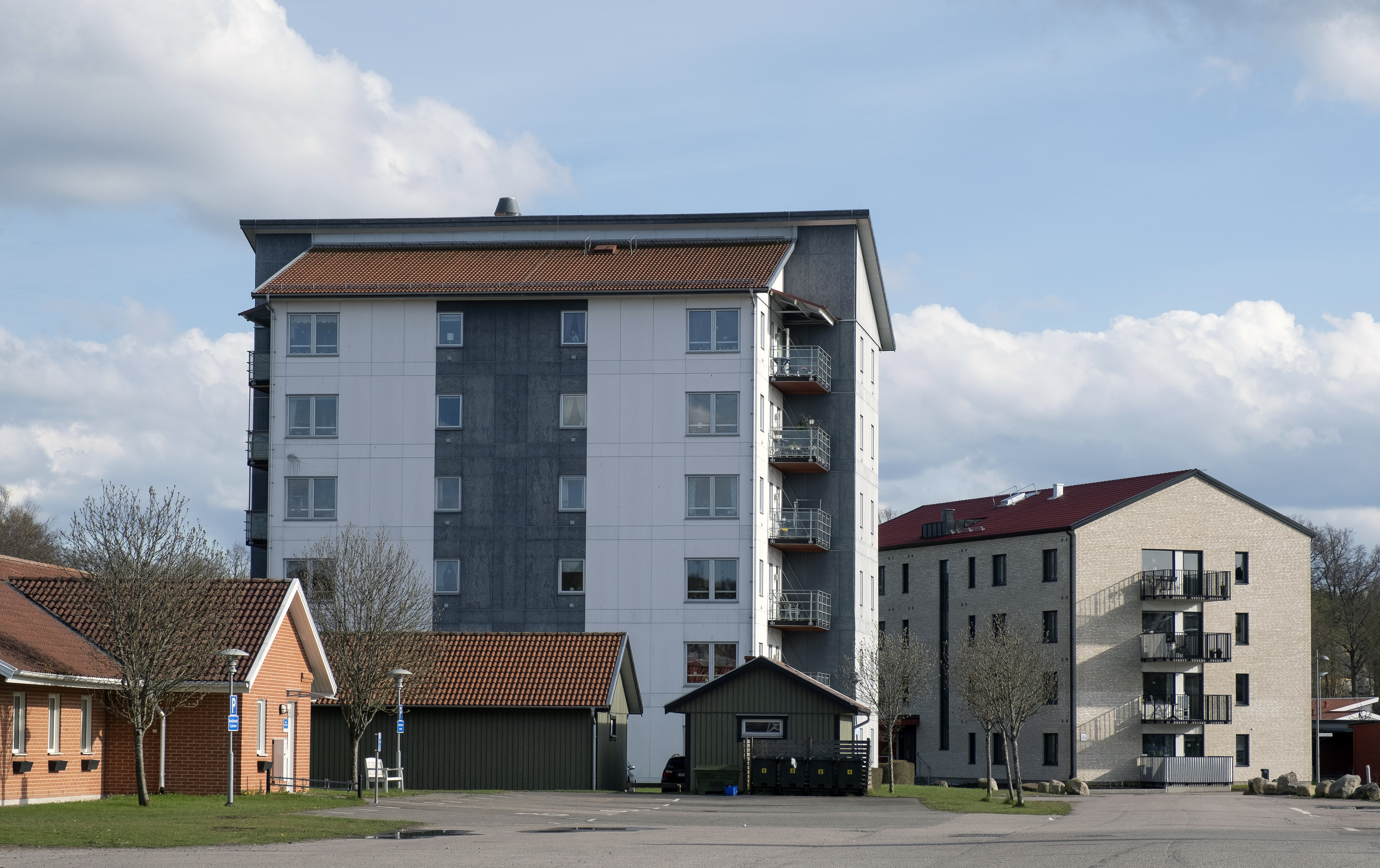
Apartment buildings in the center of Örkelljunga
