= Norn iron works =

Coordinates: 60°13′15″N 15°46′42″E

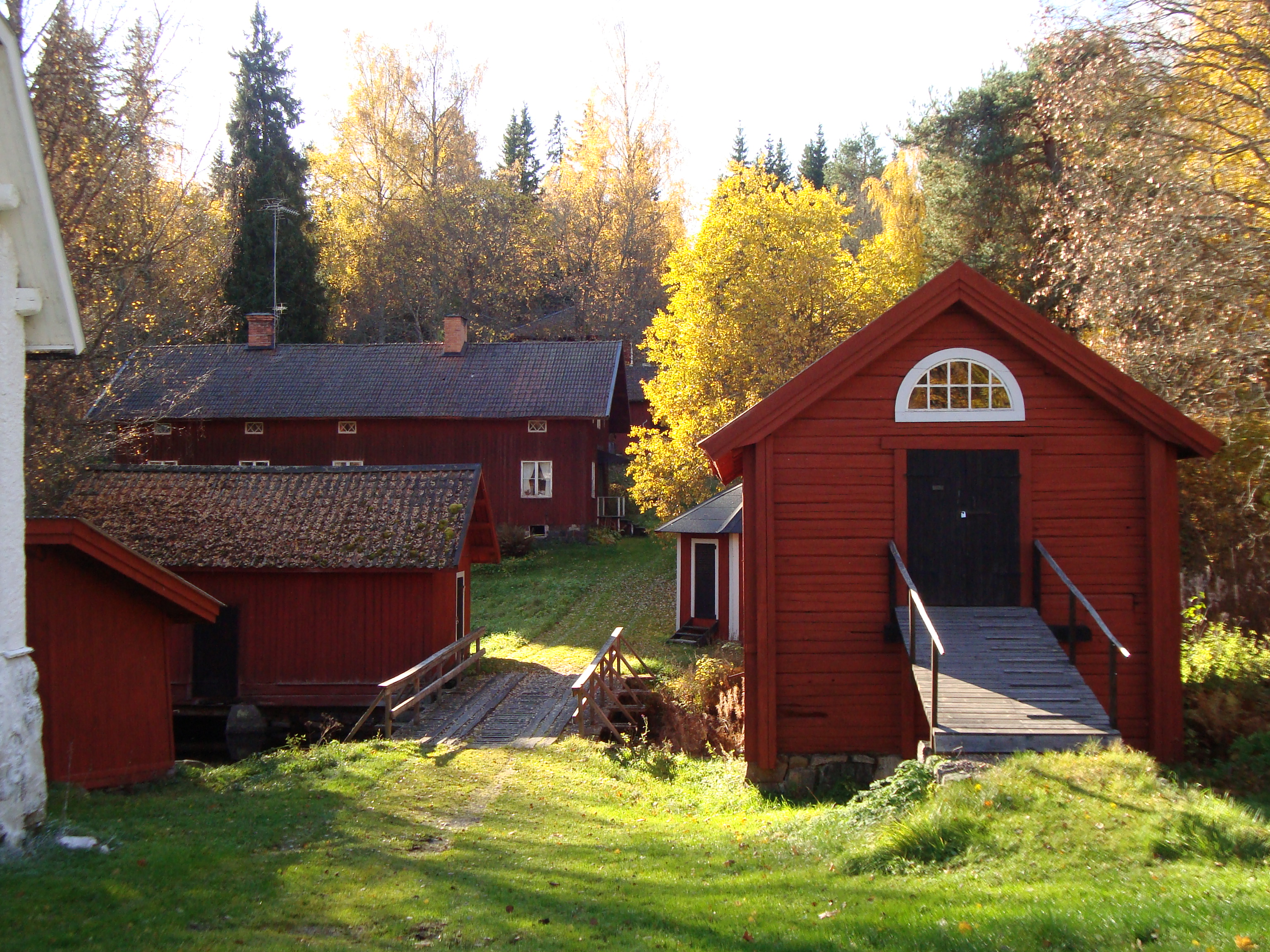
View of Norn.

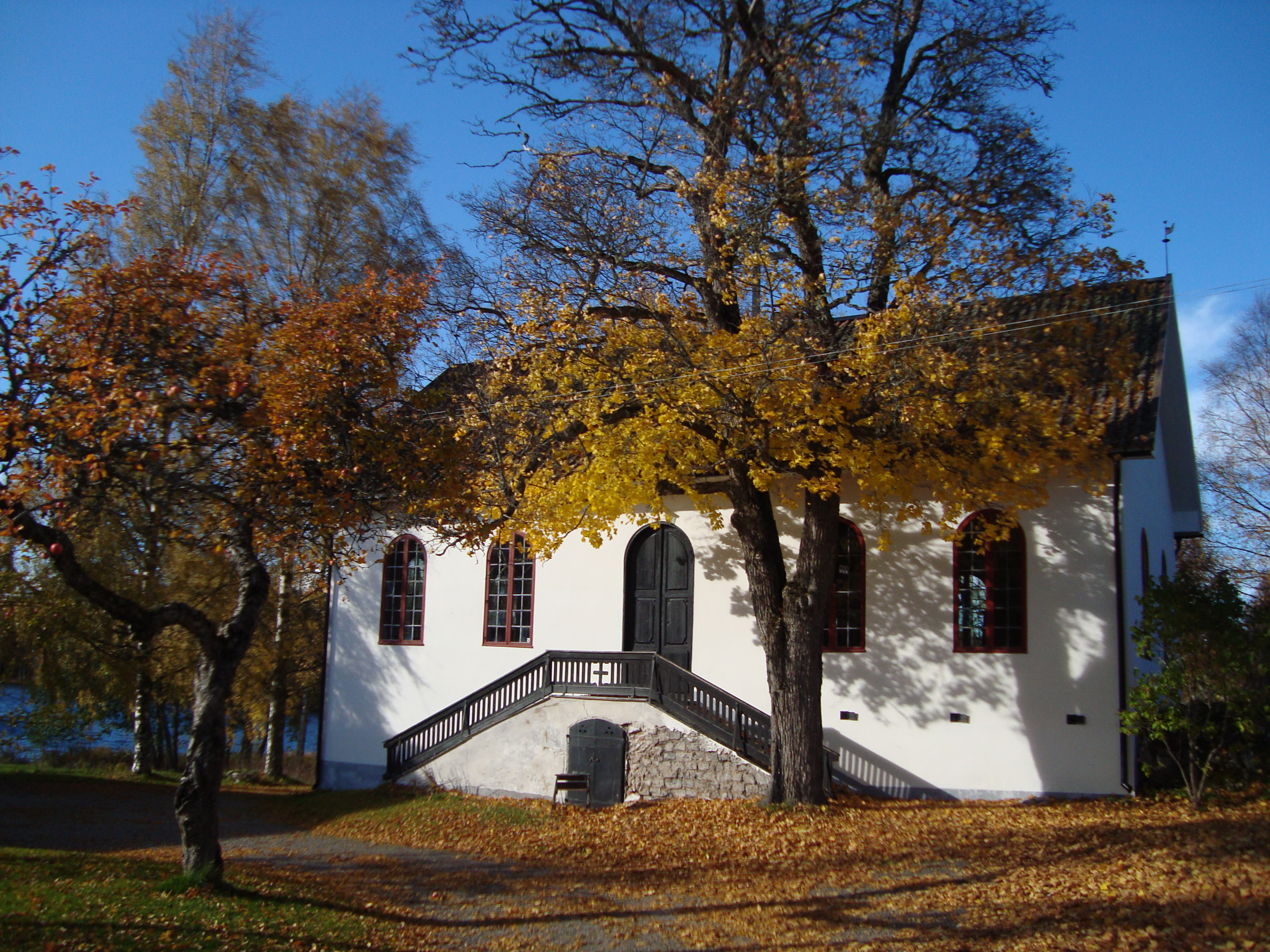
The Norn iron works chapel, built in 1759.

Norn was an industrial community in central Sweden, near Hedemora in Dalarna, within the present-day Hedemora Municipality. It was founded in 1628 by Lars Larsson. There, he constructed a smelting-house for the excavation of iron ore. The industry had continued for almost three hundred years when it finally shut down in 1916, though the power station that supplied electricity to the village is still in use.

In the latter part of the 17th century, Dutch-born entrepreneurs Abraham and Jakob Momma-Reenstierna leased or owned shares in the Norn ironworks.

There are several mines in the surrounding forest, although none of them is currently operating. The village consists of a number of houses including a chapel, a blacksmith, a school, a watermill, and a library.

There are still people living in the village, and it is a popular tourist site, particularly around midsummer, when a maypole is erected annually.
