= Ekets GoIF =

Swedish football club

- Full name: Ekets Gymnastik-och Idrottsförening
- Founded: 1943
- Ground: Ryavallen; Eket; Sweden
- Chairman: Joakim Svensson
- League: Division 5 Skåne Nordvästra
Home colours

Ekets GoIF is a Swedish football club located in Eket.

== Background ==
Ekets GoIF currently plays in Division 5 Skåne Nordvästra which is the seventh tier of Swedish football. They play their home matches at the Ryavallen in Eket.

The club is affiliated to Skånes Fotbollförbund.

== Season to season ==
Season	Level	Division	Section	Position	Movements
2006*	Tier 8	Division 6	Skåne Nordvästra A	5th	
2007	Tier 8	Division 6	Skåne Nordvästra A	3rd	Promotion playoffs – promoted
2008	Tier 7	Division 5	Skåne Nordvästra	6th	
2009	Tier 7	Division 5	Skåne Norra	3rd	Promotion playoffs
2010	Tier 7	Division 5	Skåne Norra	1st	Promoted
2011	Tier 6	Division 4	Skåne Nordvästra	7th	

* League restructuring in 2006 resulted in a new division being created at Tier 3 and subsequent divisions dropping a level.
