= Skånes-Fagerhult =

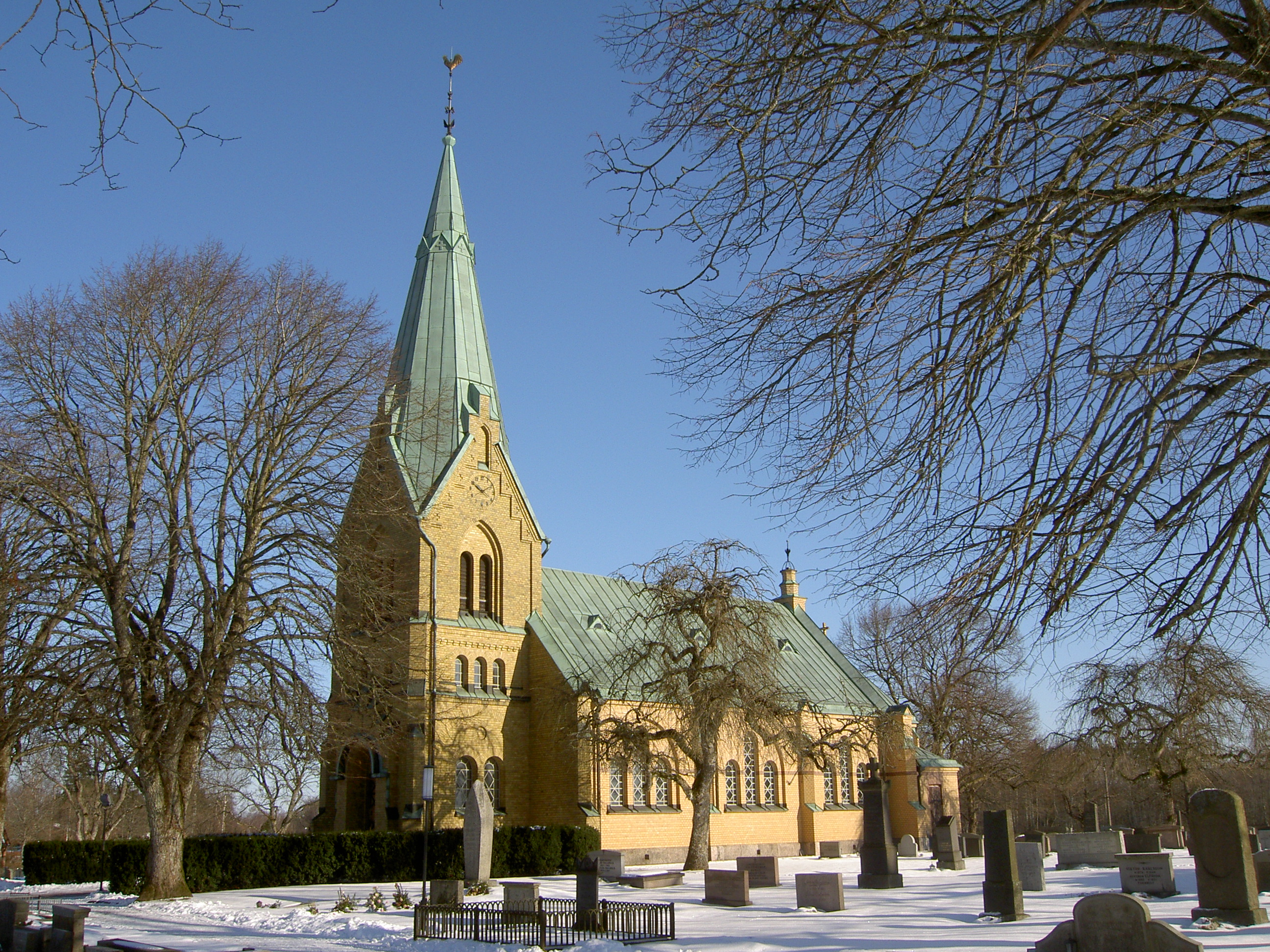
- Skånes-Fagerhult Church

- Location within Skåne Location within Sweden
- Coordinates: 56°22′N 13°29′E
- Country: Sweden
- Province: Skåne
- County: Skåne County
- Municipality: Örkelljunga Municipality

Area
  - Total: 1.64 km^{2} (0.63 sq mi)

Population (31 December 2010)
  - Total: 856
  - Density: 521/km^{2} (1,350/sq mi)
- Time zone: UTC+1 (CET)
  - Summer (DST): UTC+2 (CEST)

Skånes-Fagerhult is a locality situated in Örkelljunga Municipality, Skåne County, Sweden with 856 inhabitants in 2010.
