= Jan Borman =

Flemish sculptor

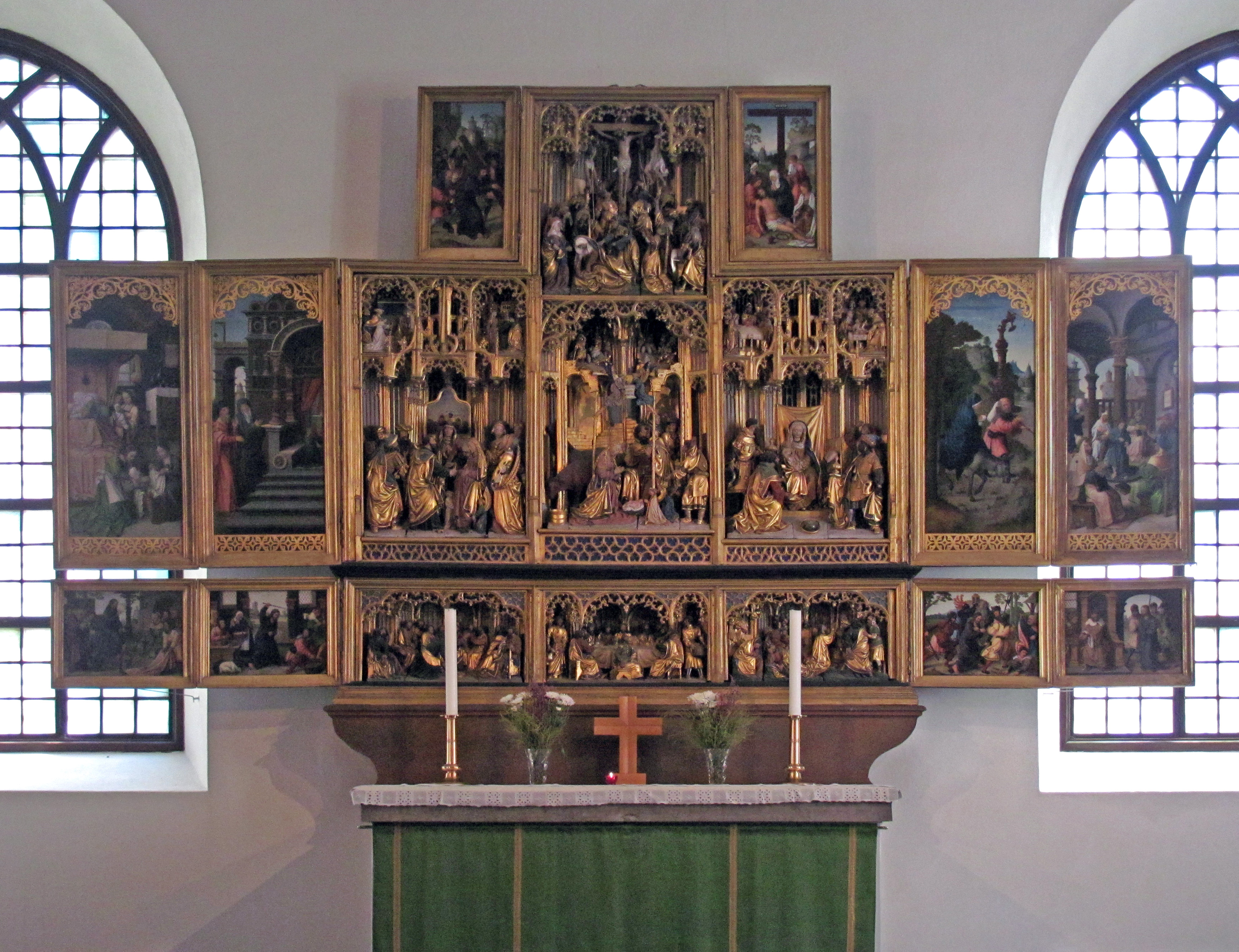
Altarpiece in Jäder Church, Sweden, attributed to Jan Borman

Jan Borman (sometimes Borreman or Borremans, fl. c. 1479–1520) was a Flemish Northern Renaissance sculptor.

== Life ==
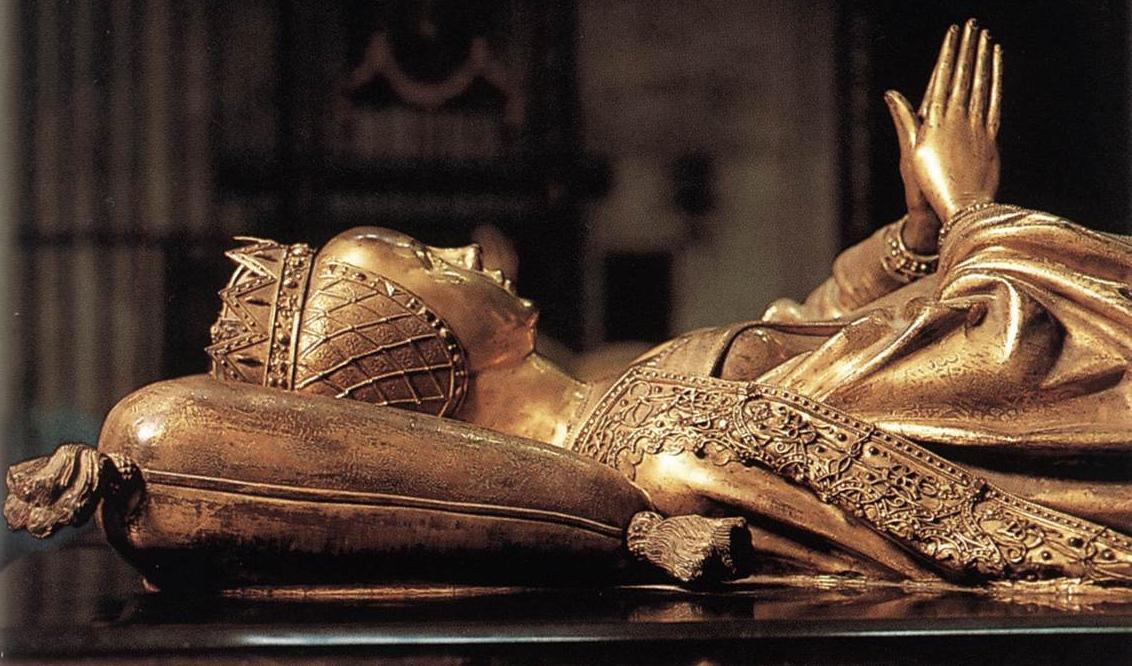
The bronze tomb of Mary of Burgundy. Jan Borman made the wooden model.

Borman belonged to a family of sculptors. His father was also a sculptor and the two seem to have worked together on at least one occasion. Jan Borman is mentioned for the first time in 1479, when he joined the guild of sculptors in Brussels. In 1484–1486, he received a commission to supply statues for one of the side-altars in Antwerp Cathedral. In 1491, in connection with a commission to restore and create new sculptures for Sint-Jacobskerk (Church of St. James) in Leuven, Borman is reported to have entered the joiner's guild of Leuven. In the same year, he was probably responsible for making the wooden model for the bronze tomb of Mary of Burgundy in the Church of Our Lady in Bruges. A few years later, he is recorded having received payment for a crucifix for the Church of St. Sulpitius in Diest.

Borman made a large, signed and dated altarpiece dedicated to St. George for the Guild of Crossbowmen in Leuven in 1493, today housed in the Art & History Museum, Brussels. It has been described as Jan Borman's most famous work.

With time, Borman became a highly regarded artist. In 1511 he was commissioned to make wooden models and other sculptures for the tombs of the Duke and Duchess of Brabant. In the same year, he is described in royal accounts as "the best sculptor". He received further prestigious commissions and official accounts imply that he may have been at some stage employed by the city of Brussels.

Jan Borman had two sons, named Jan and Passchier, who also were sculptors and who occasionally collaborated with their father.

== Works ==
Borman's style has been described, in connection with his famous 1493 altarpiece, as characterised by

"[...] meticulously carved decorative details of costume, hair and beards, [and an] agile, exaggerated sense of movement using twisting and swaying poses, the slender figures often placed with their backs to the viewer and swathed in heavy, angular, folded drapery."

— Gordon Campbell (ed.), The Grove Encyclopedia of Northern Renaissance Art

Several altarpieces have been attributed to Jan Borman, apart from the ones already mentioned. The large number and the uneven quality of the work imply that his name indicates a whole workshop rather than an individual master. A large number of altarpieces by Borman can be found in Sweden, where Strängnäs, Uppsala and Västerås cathedrals all have altarpieces attributed to his workshop. In addition, there are altarpieces in Vadstena Abbey and a number of smaller Swedish churches, e.g. Jäder, Skepptuna, Bro and Ytterselö. Other works are found in the Church of St. Nicholas in Orsoy, Germany and in the church in Boendael, Belgium, as well as in the Art Museum of Estonia (Tallinn).

An exhibition on the work of Borman and sons was mounted at the M Museum Leuven in 2019, accompanied by an exhibition catalogue.
