= Bro Church, Uppland =

Church in Stockholm County, Sweden

Coordinates: 59°30′21″N 17°37′36″E

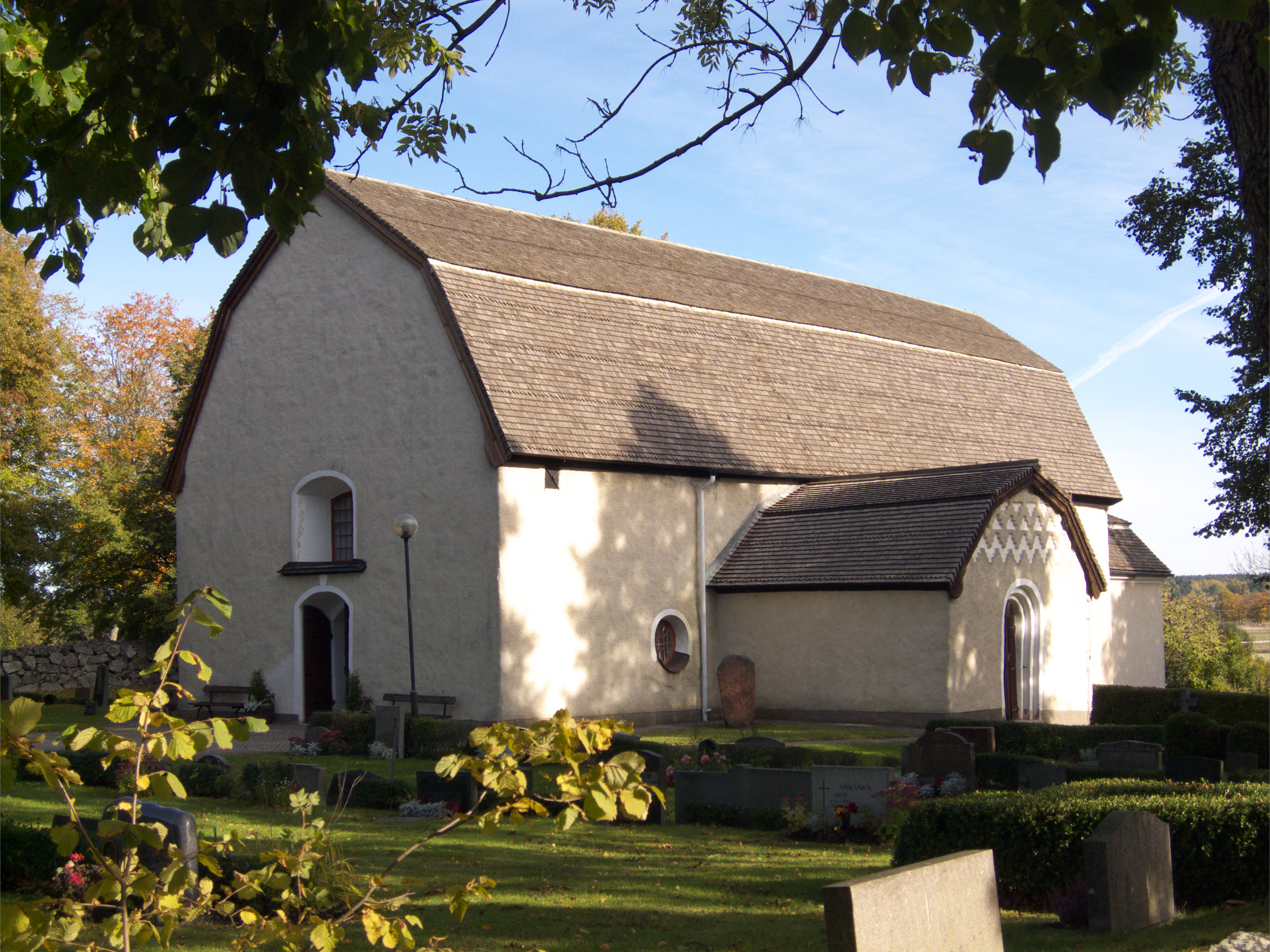
Bro Church, external view

Bro Church (Swedish: Bro kyrka) is a Lutheran church Bro in the Archdiocese of Uppsala in Stockholm County, Sweden, located approximately halfway between Stockholm and Enköping.

== History and architecture ==
Bro Church may originally have been constructed as the estate church for a nearby Crown demesne. The oldest part of Bro Church dates from the late 12th century. The building was expanded during the 14th century with the addition of a larger choir. During the 15th century, the church was vaulted and the church porch was added. During the late 18th century new and larger windows were added, as was an entrance in the western façade, a new roof and a new vestry. The church was renovated in 1914, 1947 and 1993.

Bro Church is constructed by fieldstone and brick. It is a hall church with an external church porch and vestry. An external, wooden bell tower dates from c. 1700. The church externally retains much of its medieval character (despite the later roof).

The interior is dominated by the medieval vaulting. Among the furnishings, the baptismal font is the oldest, dating from the late 12th century, intricately sculpted and made of stone from the area around lake Mälaren, i.e. locally. In the church there is also a carved wooden figure of a male saint, made in Sweden, and an altarpiece from c. 1500 made in the atelier of Jan Borman in Flanders. The pulpit and the pews are Baroque in style.
