= Skepptuna Church =

Medieval Lutheran church in Sweden

Coordinates: 59°42′32″N 18°05′35″E

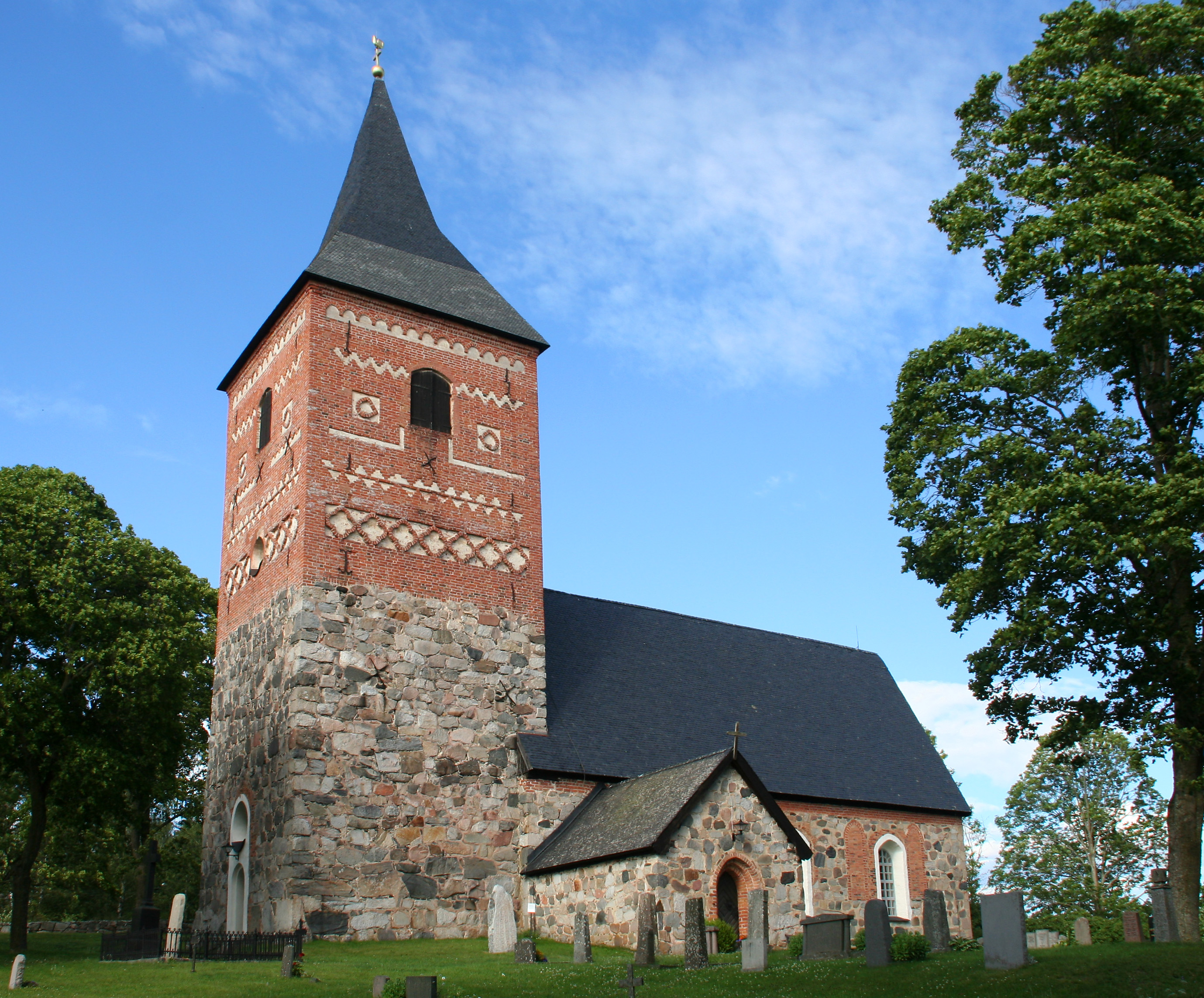
Skepptuna Church, external view

Skepptuna Church (Swedish: Skepptuna kyrka) is a medieval Lutheran church in the Archdiocese of Uppsala in Stockholm County, Sweden.

== History ==
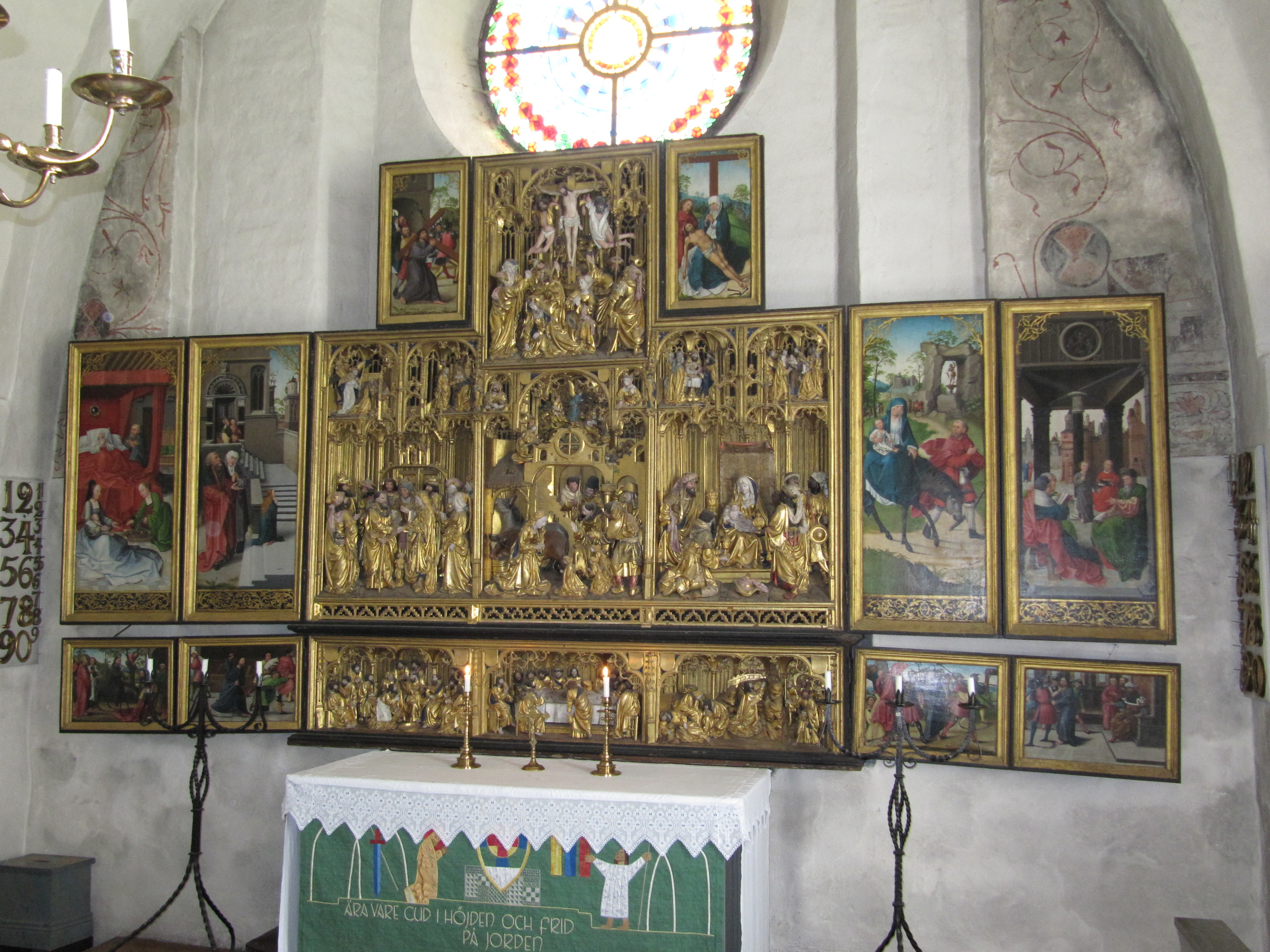
Altarpiece from the workshop of Jan Borman

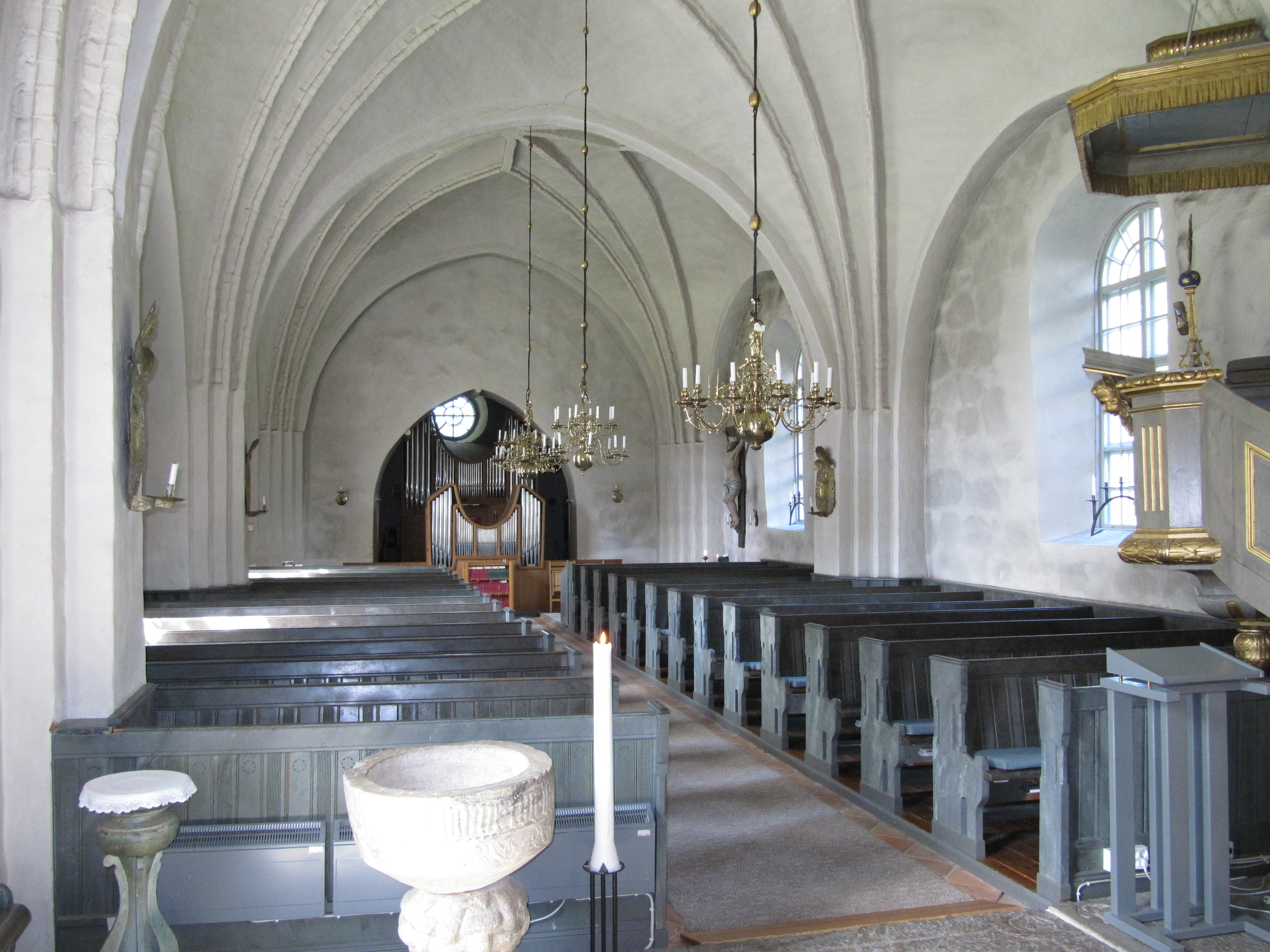
Interior

There is evidence in the form of a runestone (rune inscription U 358) that there have been Christian people in the area since at least the early 11th century. The oldest part of the church however dates from the early 13th century. It was continuously expanded throughout the Middle Ages and received its present look during the 15th century. In 1776, the tower spire was found to have started to rot and was exchanged for the present one. Since then the church has remained largely unaltered. A renovation of the church was carried out in 1907, when a number of frescos were also rediscovered and restored.

== Architecture ==
The church is built of roughly hewn stone blocks, with additions made by brick. The most noteworthy part of the exterior is the fine Brick Gothic tower, probably inspired by the nearby Uppsala Cathedral, which was at the time of the construction of Skepptuna Church's relatively new tower (c. 1400 – 1450).

Inside, the church is whitewashed save for a few fragments of medieval frescos. The church's altarpiece is a Northern Renaissance piece, made in the atelier of Flemish sculptor Jan Borman (c. 1479-1520). A medieval wooden sculpture depicting Thomas Becket, made in the atelier of Bernt Notke (c. 1440-1509), formerly also belonged to the church but is today on display at the Swedish History Museum.

== Gallery ==
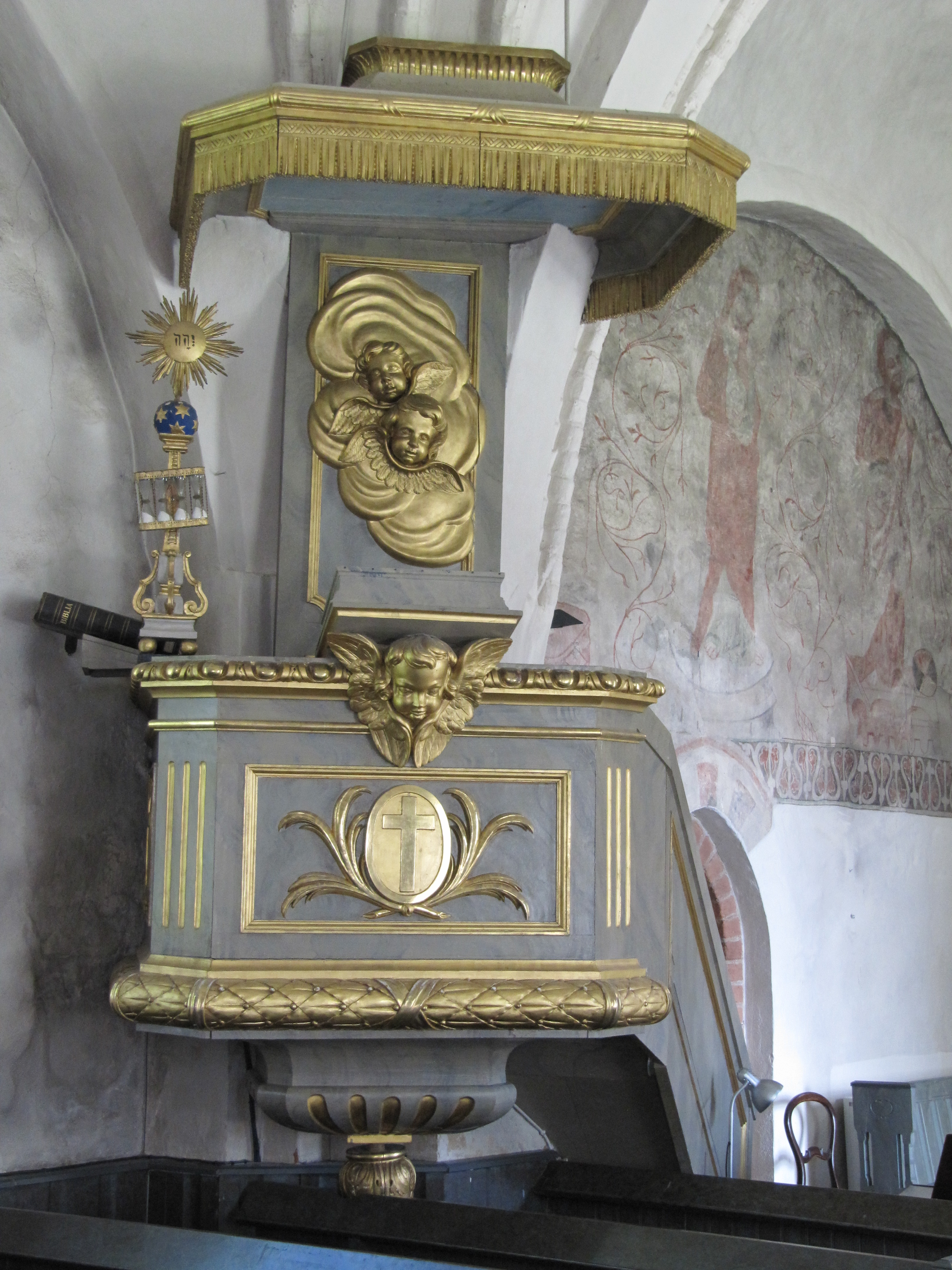
Pulpit

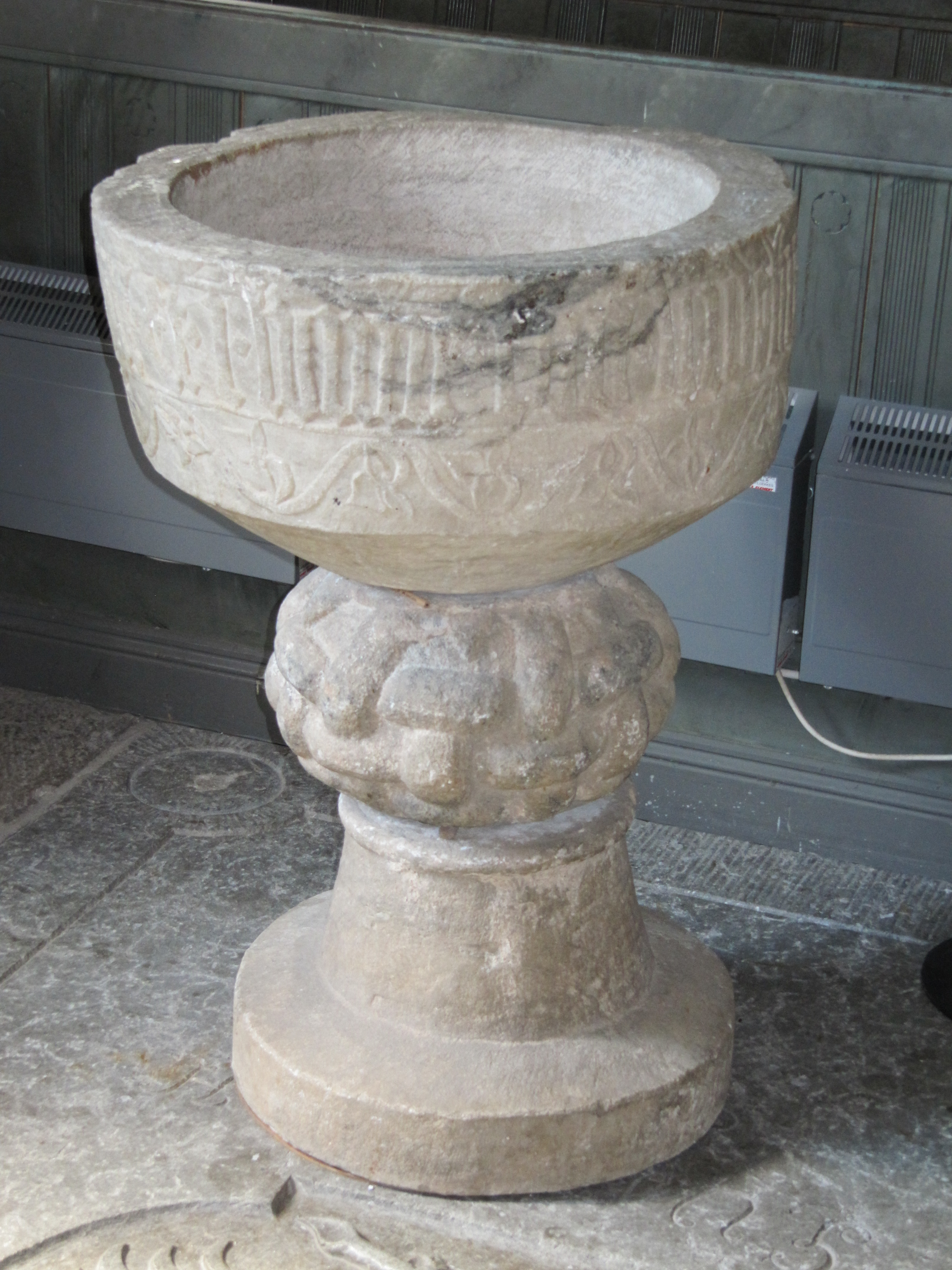
Baptismal font

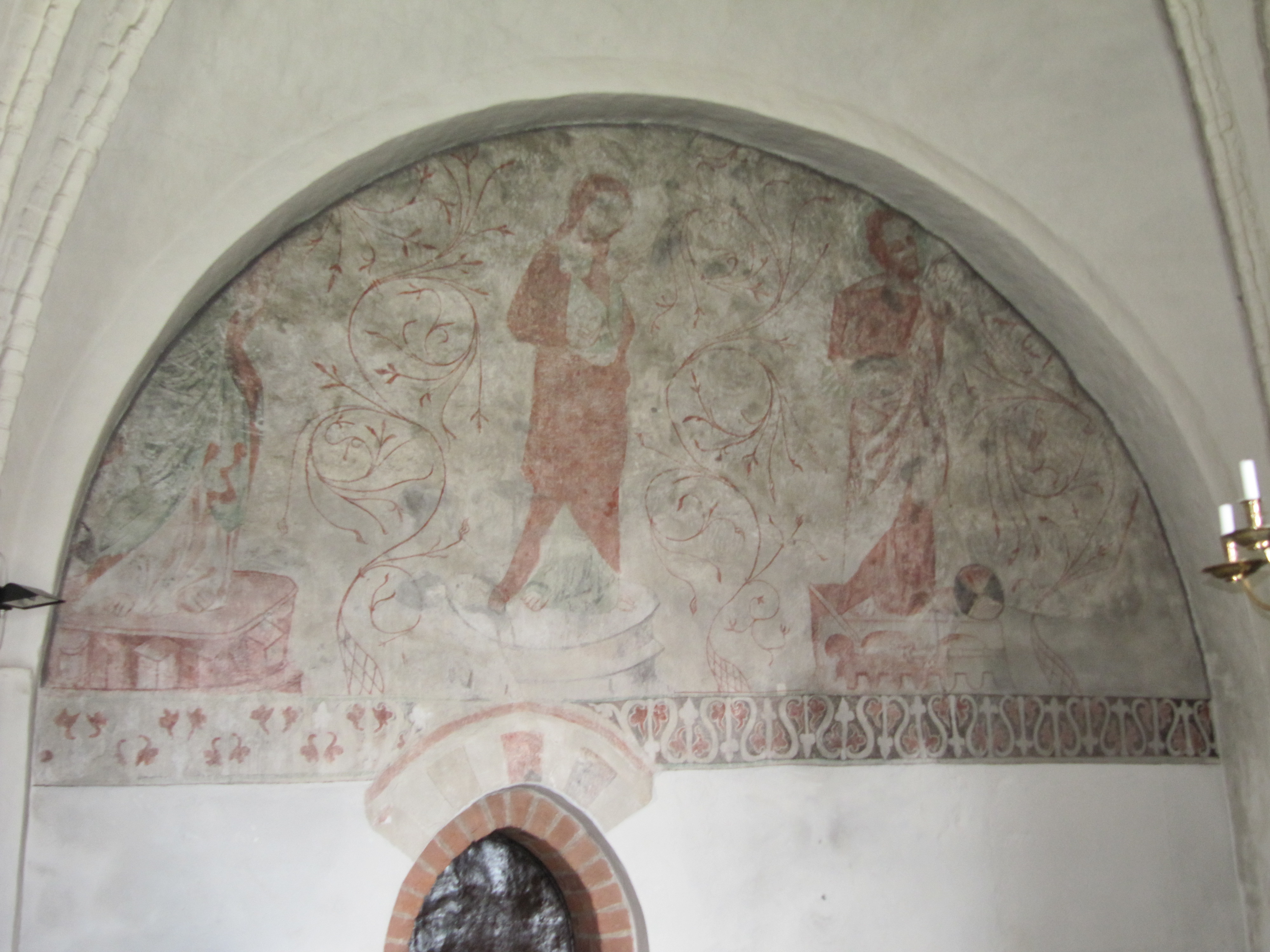
Lime painting on the north corridor wall

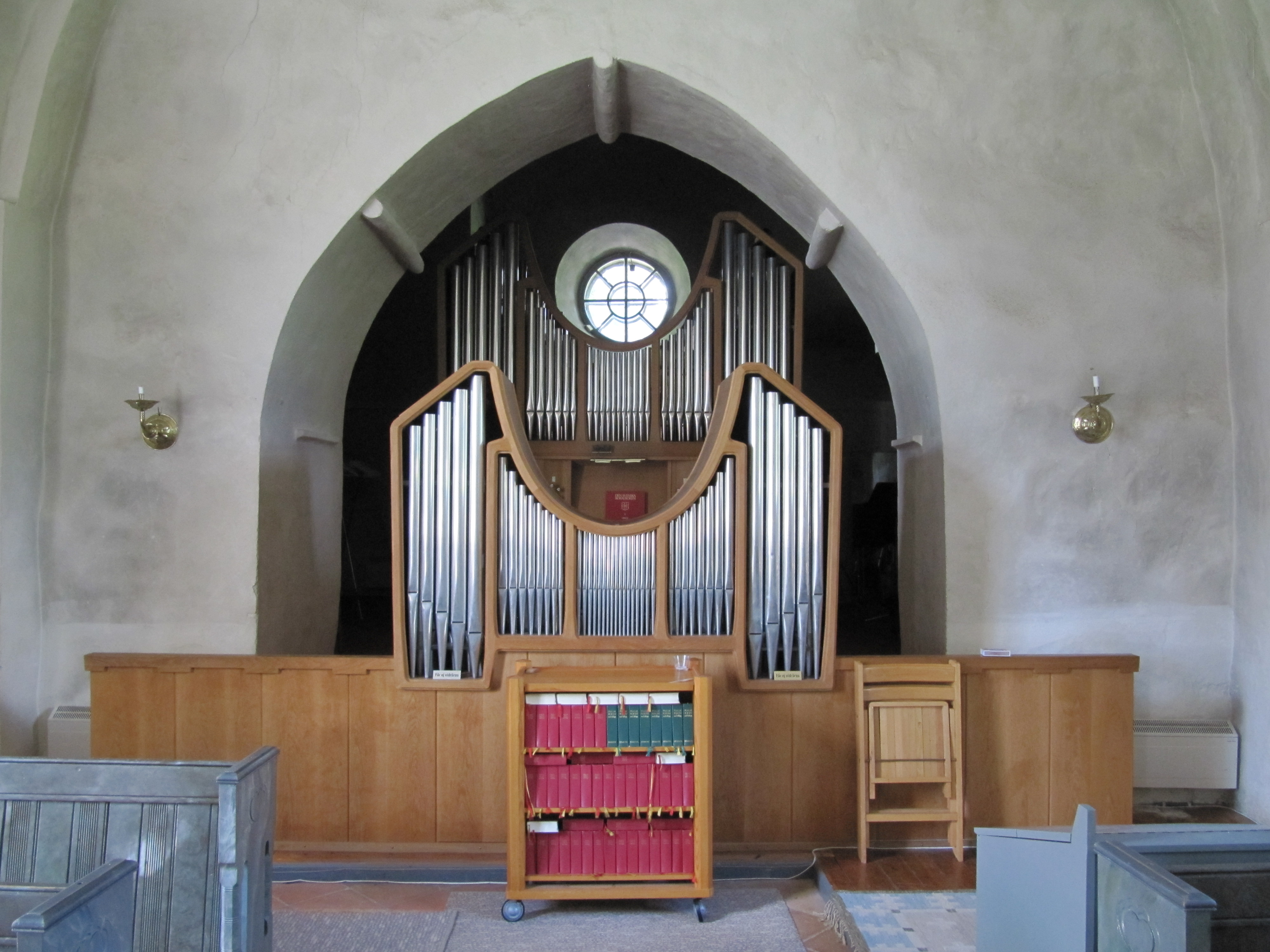
Organ

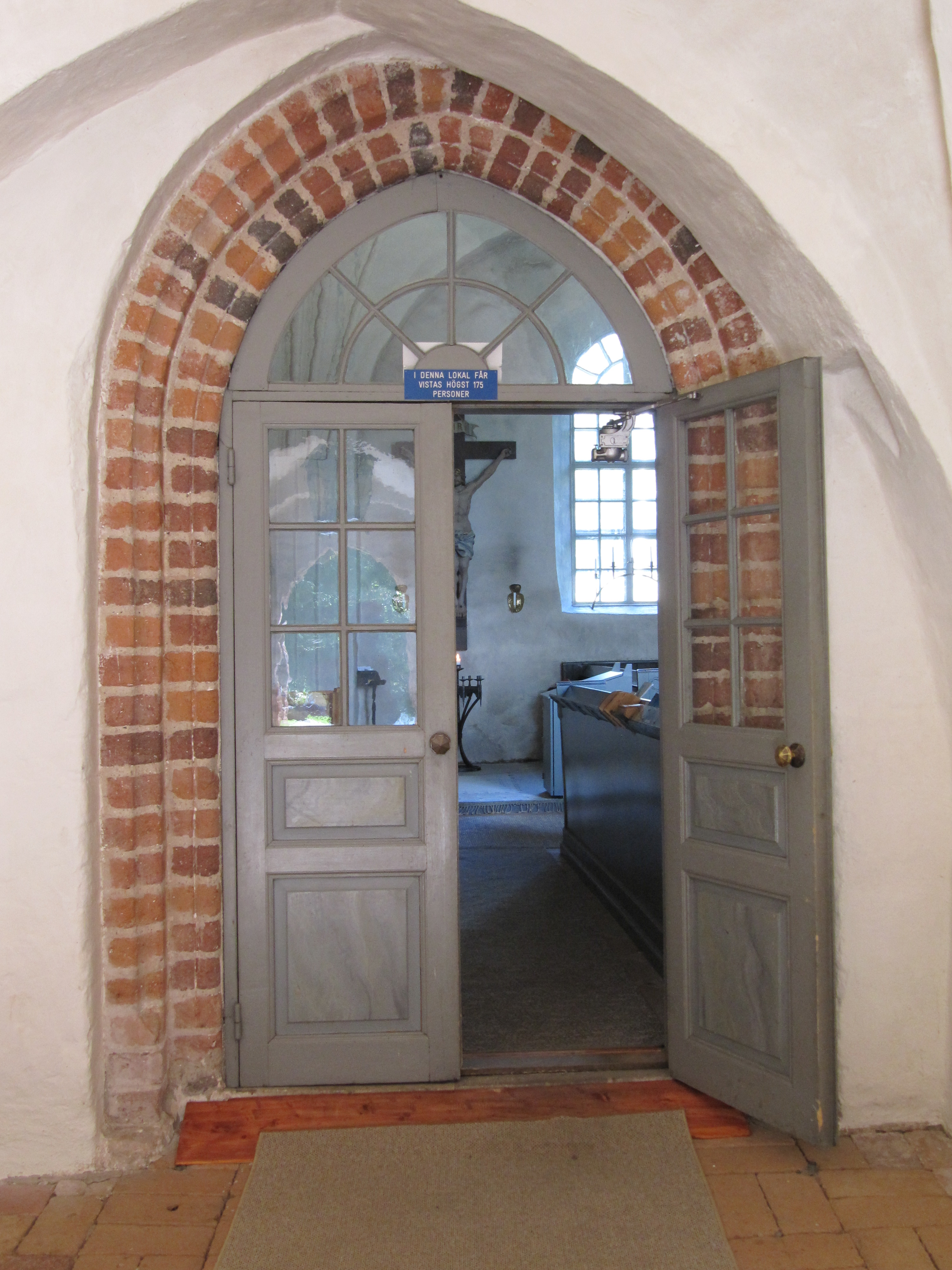
Portal
