= Madonna of Bruges =

Sculpture by Michelangelo

Coordinates: 51°12′17″N 3°13′28″E

Madonna and Child
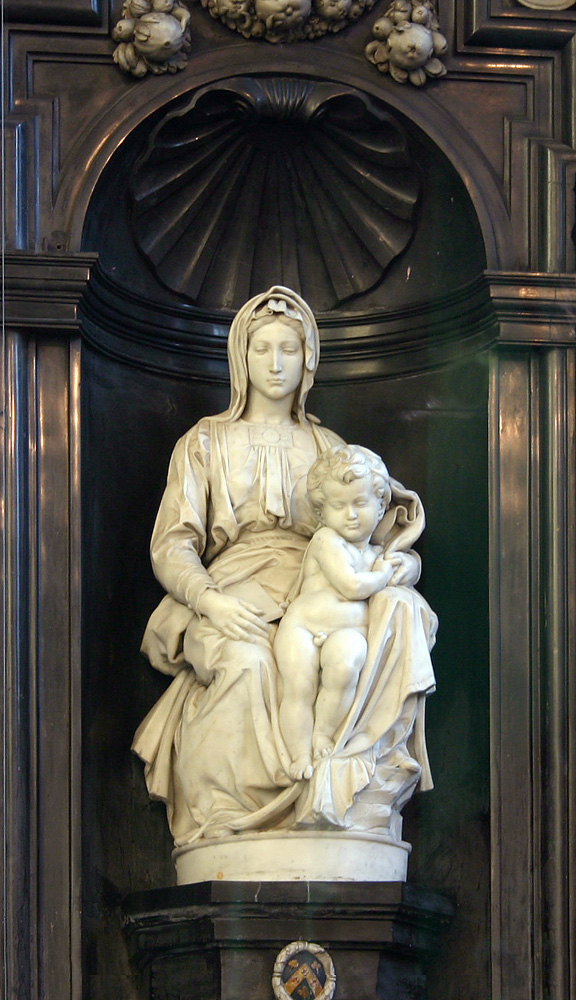
- Artist: Michelangelo
- Year: 1503-1505
- Type: Marble
- Dimensions: 128 cm (50 in)
- Location: Onze Lieve Vrouwekerk, Bruges
- Preceded by: David (Michelangelo)
- Followed by: Pitti Tondo

The Madonna of Bruges is a marble sculpture by Michelangelo of the Virgin and Child.

Michelangelo's depiction of the Madonna and Child differs significantly from earlier representations of the same subject, which tended to feature a pious Virgin smiling down on an infant held in her arms. Instead, Jesus stands upright, almost unsupported, only loosely restrained by Mary's left hand, and appears to be about to step away from his mother. Meanwhile, Mary does not cling to her son or even look at him, but gazes down and away. It is believed the work was originally intended for an altar piece. If this is so, then it would have been displayed facing slightly to the right and looking down. The early 16th-century sculpture also displays the High Renaissance Pyramid style frequently seen in the works of Leonardo da Vinci during the late 1400s.

Madonna and Child shares certain similarities with Michelangelo's Pietà, which was completed shortly before – mainly, Mary's flowing robe, and the movement of the drapery. The long, oval face of Mary is also reminiscent of the Pietà.

The work is also notable in that it was the first sculpture by Michelangelo to leave Italy during his lifetime. In 1504, it was bought by Giovanni and Alessandro Moscheroni (Mouscron) for 100 ducats. The Mouscron brothers were wealthy cloth merchants in Bruges, then one of the leading commercial cities in Europe.

The sculpture was removed twice from Belgium after its initial arrival. The first was in 1794 after French Revolutionaries had conquered the Austrian Netherlands during the French Revolutionary Wars; the citizens of Bruges were ordered to ship it and several other valuable works of art to Paris. It was returned after Napoleon's final defeat at Waterloo in 1815.

The second removal was in 1944, during World War II, with the retreat of German soldiers, who smuggled the sculpture to Germany enveloped in mattresses in a Red Cross truck. It was discovered a year later in Altaussee, Austria within a salt mine and again returned. It now sits in the Church of Our Lady in Bruges, Belgium. This is represented in the 2014 film The Monuments Men.

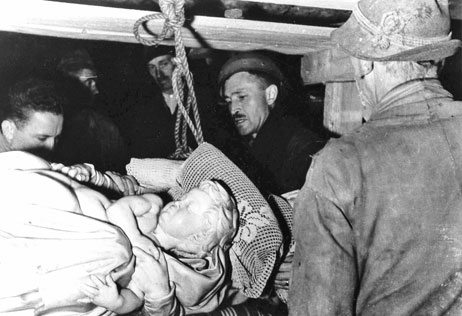
The statue being recovered from the Altaussee salt mine

== See also ==
- List of works by Michelangelo
- Roman Catholic Marian art
