= Bro, Upplands-Bro =

Bro
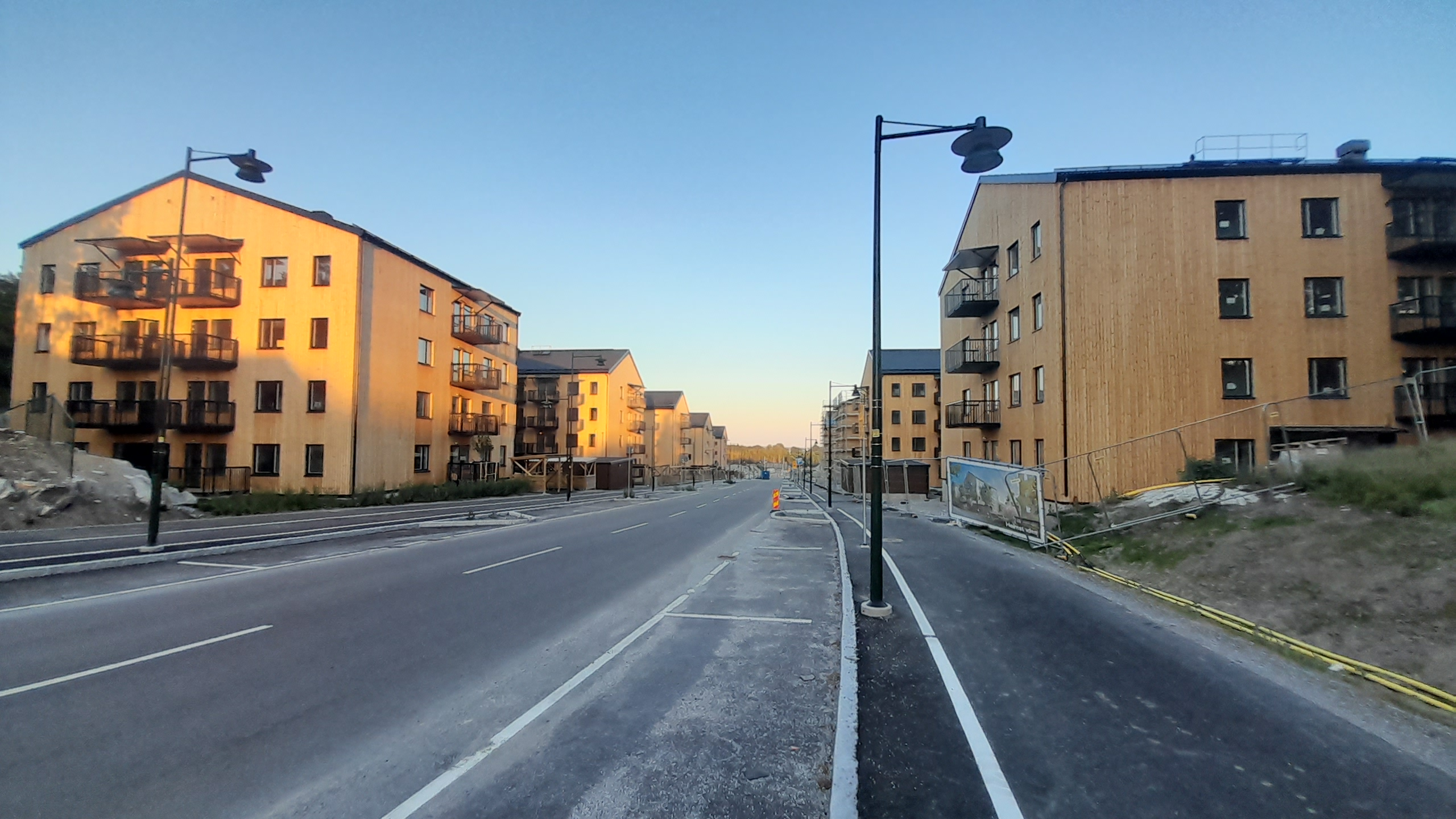
- Brogardstaden

- Location within Stockholm Location within Sweden Location within European Union
- Coordinates: 59°31′N 17°39′E
- Country: Sweden
- Province: Uppland
- County: Stockholm County
- Municipality: Upplands-Bro Municipality

Area
  - Total: 3.01 km^{2} (1.16 sq mi)

Population (31 December 2020)
  - Total: 9,485
  - Density: 3,150/km^{2} (8,160/sq mi)
- Time zone: UTC+1 (CET)
  - Summer (DST): UTC+2 (CEST)

Bro is a locality situated in Upplands-Bro Municipality, Stockholm County, Sweden with 7,050 inhabitants in 2010.

It is situated 10 km north-west of the municipal seat Kungsängen. Since 2000 Bro has a station on the Stockholm commuter rail network and a bus stop located near the station.

== See also ==
- Bro Church
