= Tomb of Mary of Burgundy =

Sculpted tomb dedicated to Mary of Burgundy

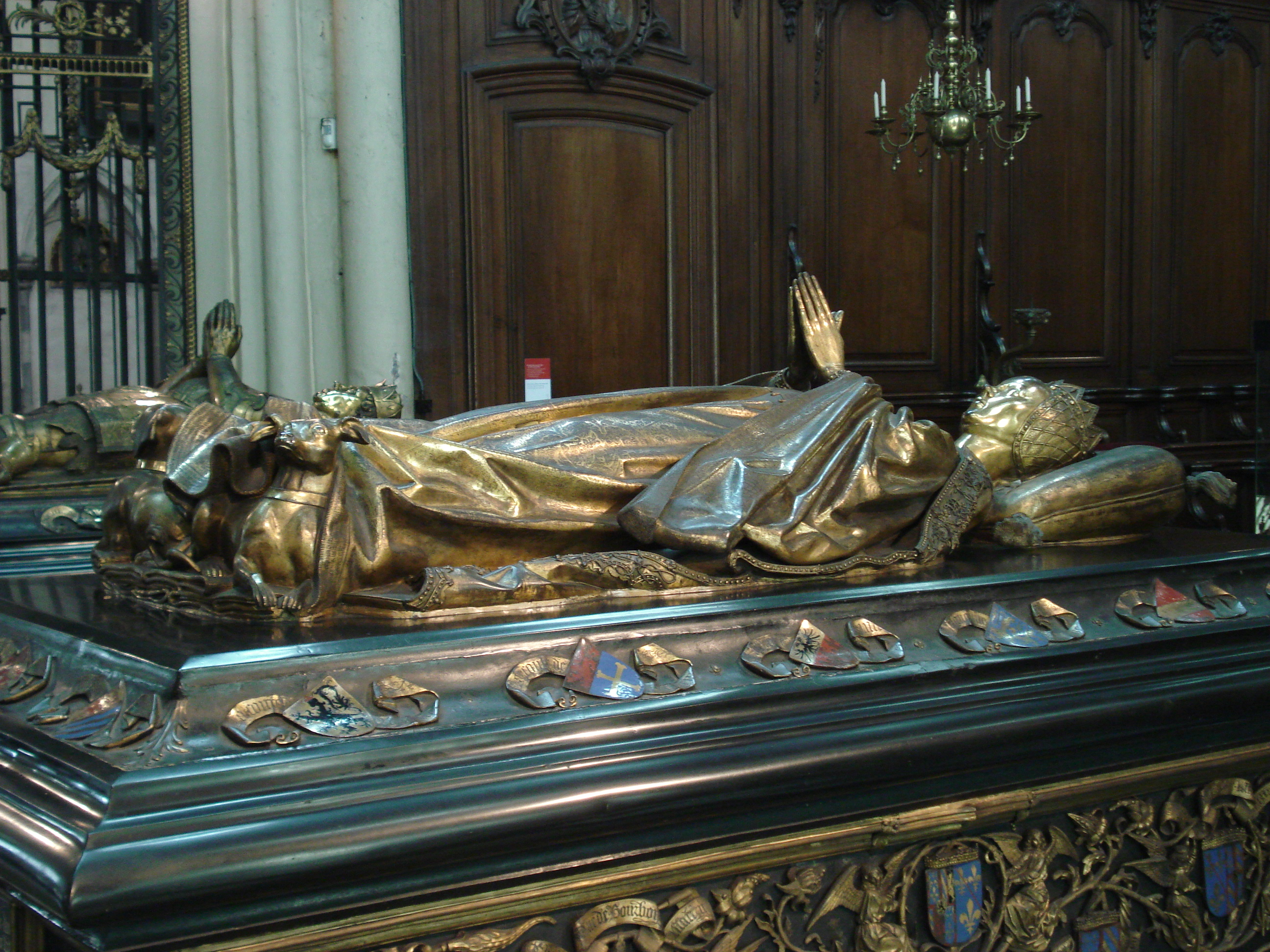
- Material: Gilt-bronze, copper, brass, vitreous enamel
- Size: Length: 260 cm (100 in); Width: 135 cm (53 in); Height: 135 cm (53 in)
- Created: Completed 1501
- Period/culture: International Gothic, Northern Renaissance
- Present location: Church of Our Lady, Bruges

The Tomb of Mary of Burgundy is a funeral monument completed in 1501 for Mary of Burgundy's grave in the Church of Our Lady, Bruges. She died in March 1482, aged 25, following injuries sustained during a hunting accident a number of weeks earlier.

Mary was born in 1457 as the only child of Charles the Bold and Isabella of Bourbon. On her father's death at the Battle of Nancy, she became the last of the House of Valois-Burgundy and inherited the Duchy of Burgundy, making her the then-richest woman in Europe.

The tomb was commissioned by her husband Maximilian of Austria and their eldest child Philip the Fair, based on a rough design specified during her deathbed wishes. A number of sculptors, stonemason and painters, perhaps headed by the Flemish sculptor Renier van Thienen, were involved in its creation; records suggest contributions by Jan Borman, Pieter de Backere and Jehan Hervy, although the chronology and the extent of their individual contributions are unknown.

== Death of Mary of Burgundy ==
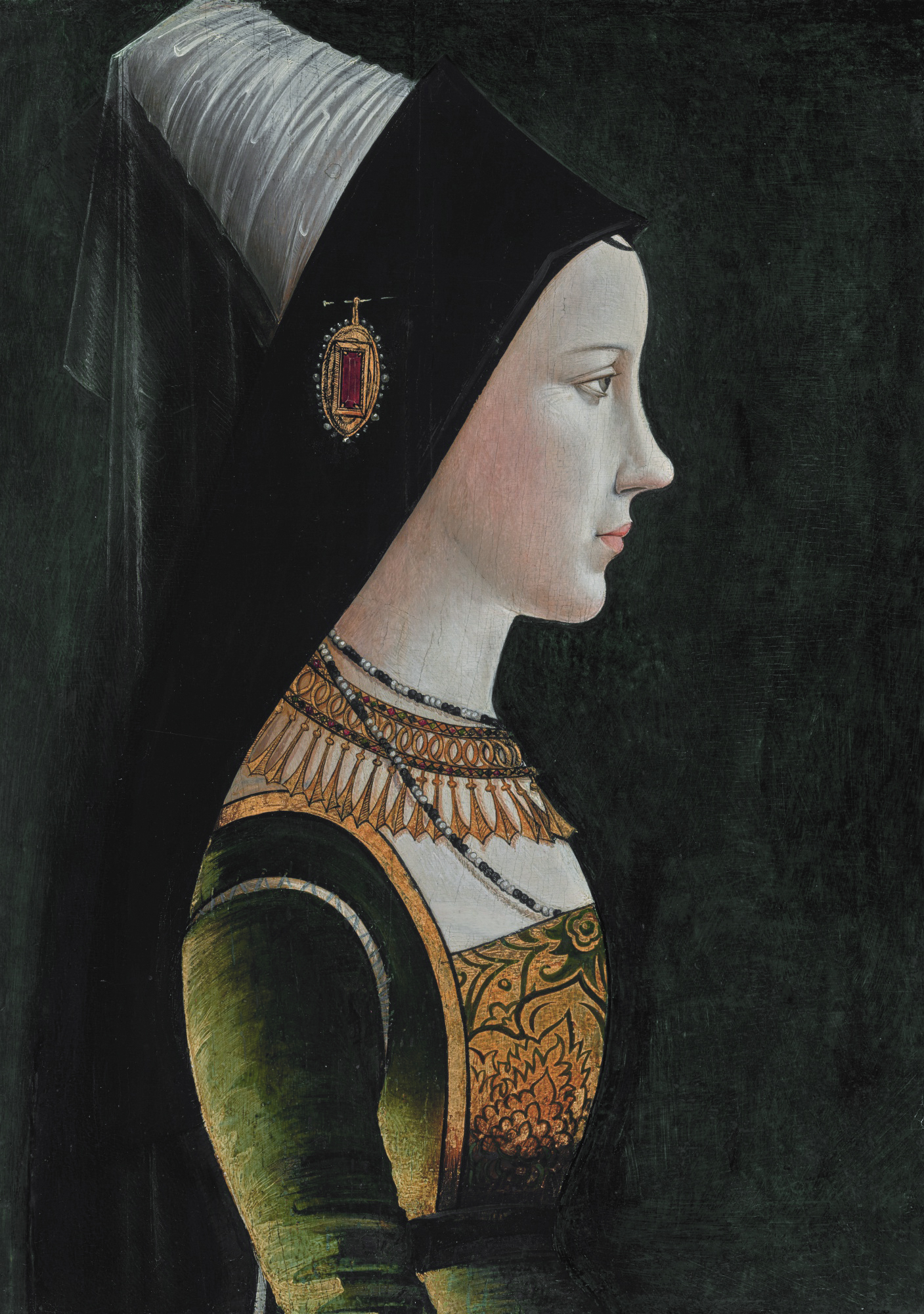
(Idealised) Portrait of Mary of Burgundy, Netherlandish or South German, late 15th century

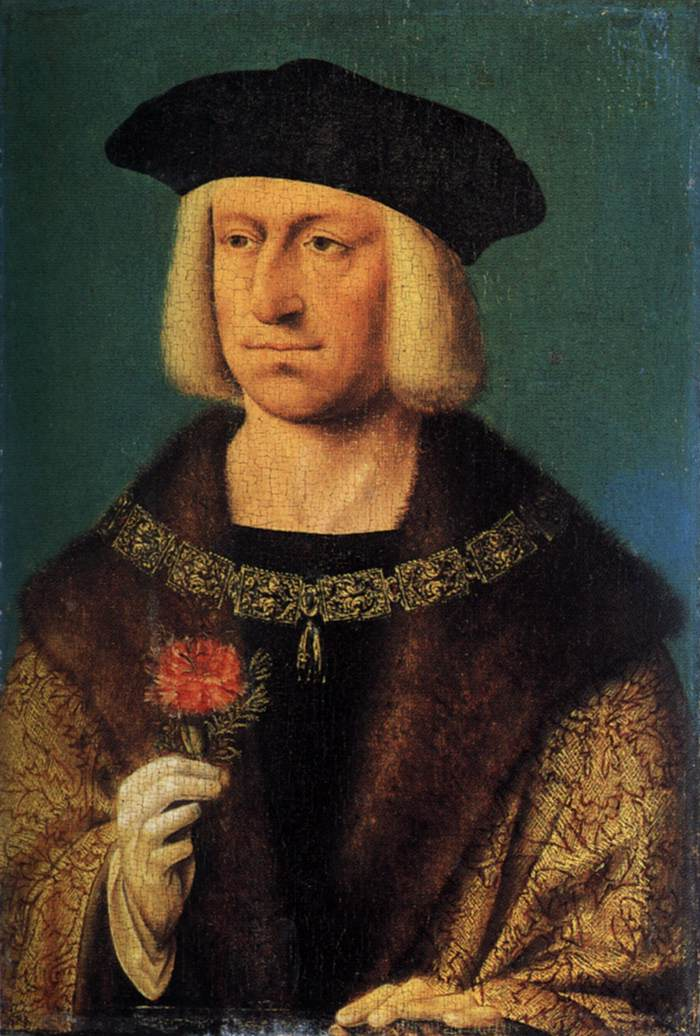
Portrait of Emperor Maximilian I, Workshop of Joos van Cleve, c. 1530

Mary was born in 1457 as the only child of Charles the Bold (1433–1477) and Isabella of Bourbon (1434–1465). Mary was eight years old when her mother died. She was a well-recognised patron of the arts, and, aged 18, commissioned a tomb for her mother (which she had significant input into Isabella's tomb; it was still incomplete by the time of her own early death). She oversaw and approved many elements of its design—as she later did with the tomb for her uncle Jacques de Bourbon.

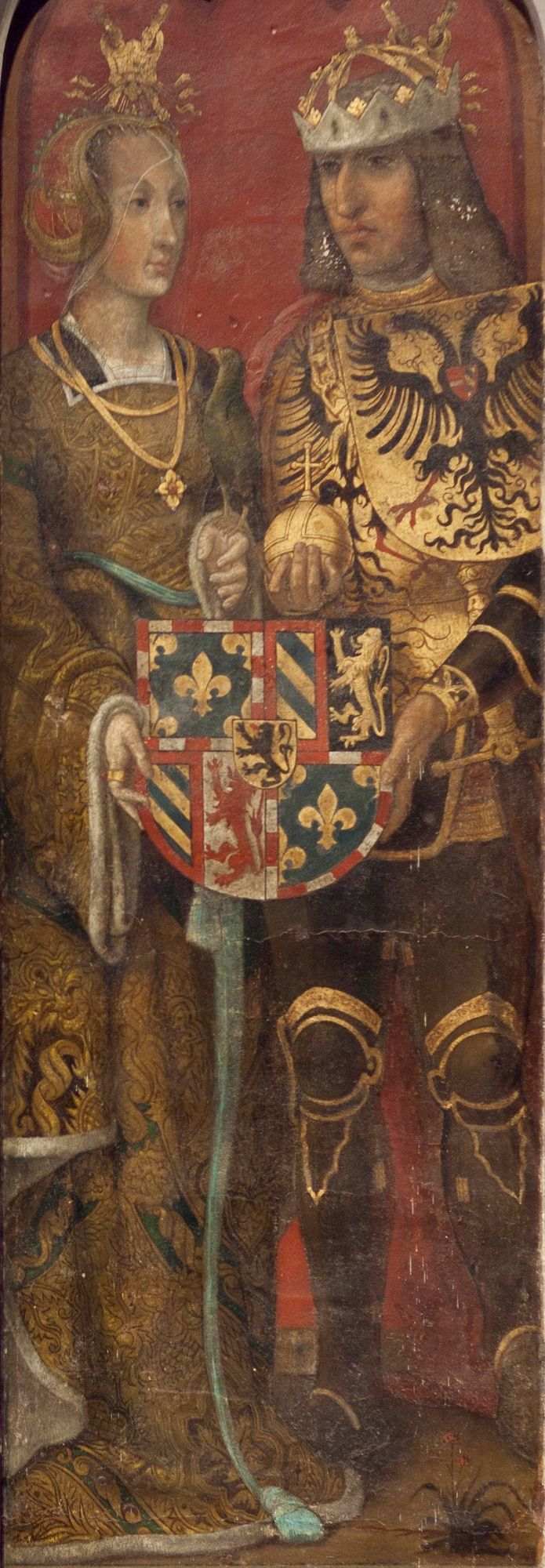
19th-century reproduction of a 1507 fresco of Maximilian and Mary holding a falcon and the coat of arms of Burgundy

In order to counter the French king Louis XI's attempts to bring Burgundy under his control, Charles (who had spent most of his life battling Louis) betrothed Mary to Maximilian of Austria in 1476. They married the following year when they were both in their early teens. Although their marriage was arranged, the two developed a romantic bond and were faithful to each other. As Charles had planned, their union allowed his family to retain parts of the Burgundian lands, although the inheritance line changed from the House of Valois to the House of Habsburg. Charles was killed at the Battle of Nancy in January 1477 while fighting against Louis XI, making her, at 19 years, the sole inheritor of the Duchy of Burgundy and the last of the House of Valois-Burgundy.

Mary was falconing on a hunt with Maximilian and knights of the court in a forest outside Bruges when her horse tripped and threw her in a ditch before landing on top of her. Having sustained massive internal injures and a broken back, she died several weeks later on 27 March, having dictated a will and testament that outlined her wishes for a monument which she requested that she would be buried—according to an 1844 reproduction of the will—"honourably according to her station" and that a "large and beautiful" image of the Virgin was placed "before this sepulchre or sarcophagus."

As per her dying wishes, she was buried under the choir of the Church of Our Lady, Bruges on 3 April 1482. Bruges was then at the height of its commercial and cultural importance and was the birthplace of her son, while it was important to Mary that the church bore her own namesake. Although the court was near bankrupt at the time, Maximilian threw a lavish ceremony, partly funded by melting down and selling off their cutlery and silverware. Due to these financial constraints, work of Mary's tomb did not begin until at least September 1488.

== Commission and attribution ==
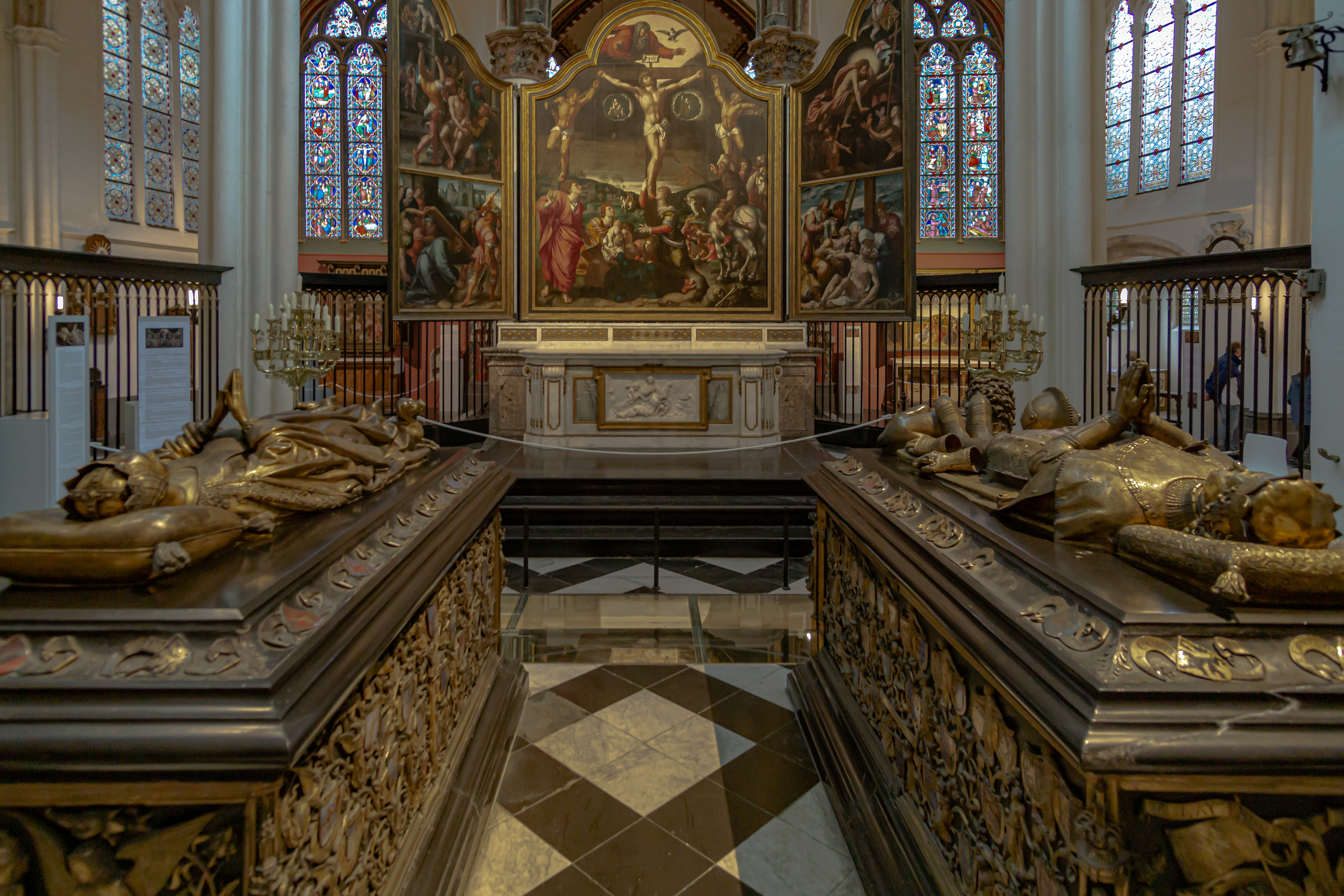
Position in the Church of Our Lady, resting alongside the tomb of her father

Mary's dying wishes were carried out under the patronage of her husband Maximilian and her eldest son Philip the Fair (d. 1506). Although the circumstances of the build are not well documented, it known from archives dated 1488 that the project was overseen by the executor of her will, Thibault Barradot (d. 1503), a high ranking financier who had been her Maître de la Chambre des Denier (Master of Coins), and was appointed to the project almost immediately after her death.

Barradot had difficulty raising funds due to political and legal complications around the distribution of Mary's wealth to her two surviving children. He first had to pay off substantial debts to her creditors, which he funded via rent and taxes from her estates. Eventually, he was able to purchase the marble from the stone merchant Martin de Bouge for 30 pounds and hire a number of well-known designers and sculptors. Records indicate that stonemasons were working on the monument before July 1493 when Renier van Thienen was contracted to oversee the initial build, however he may have been involved in its planning since 1491. He hired masons and stonecutters to begin work on the base. Although the historical record is scant as to the sequence and specific attributions of individual artists, art historians generally attribute a group that includes Jan Borman, Pieter de Backere and Jehan Hervy, although the chronology and the extent of their individual contributions is unknown.

== Description ==
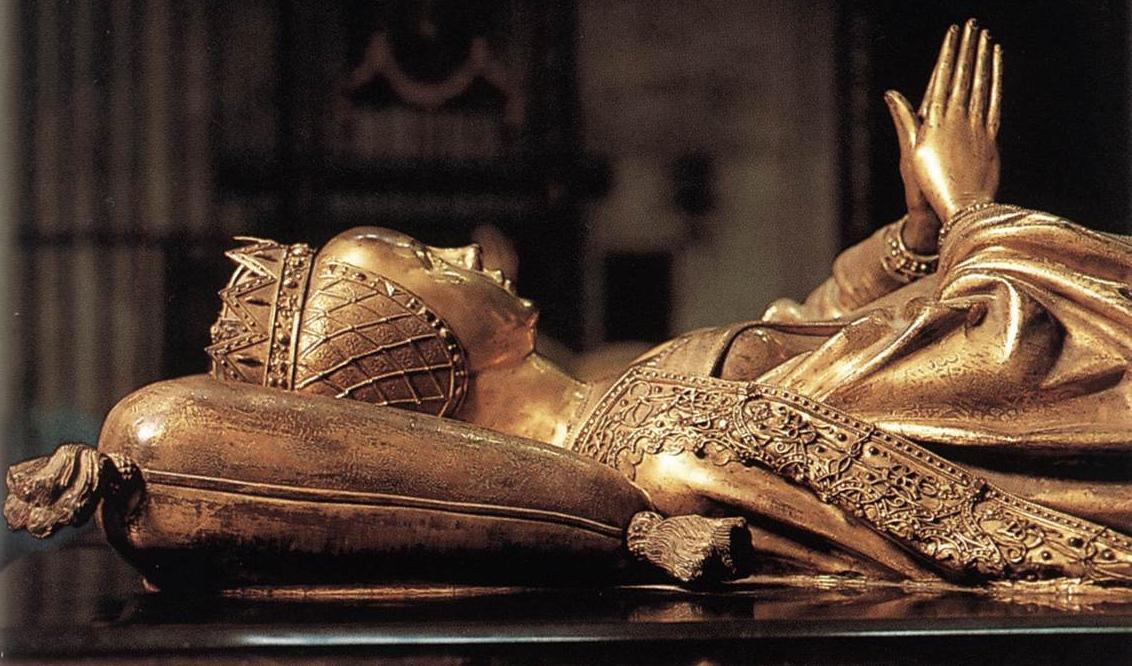
Detail of the effigy

Unlike the tombs of her ancestors reaching back to that of Philip the Bold (d. 1404) and his son John the Fearless (d. 1419), Mary's is made from metal rather than alabaster and marble and lacks the characteristic mourners ("weepers" or "pleurants") found on the sides of most Burgundian tombs, a deliberate choice made instead to honour both sides of her family via heraldry.

The monument consists of Mary's gilt-bronze effigy placed over a hollow rectangular tomb made of black stone. The tomb's long sides are heavily decorated with gilt-bronze branches of her family tree and hanging enamelled shields displaying the coats of arms of her ancestors. The short-side below her head contains her own coats of arms.

Her head rests on a pillow, and her hands are joined and raised in prayer. The epitaph appears in a long scroll that has angels on either side. It is written in blackletter (Gothic script) and reads "Marie de Bourgongne Archiduchesse daustrice fille Charles duc de Bourgongne et de Ysabeau de Bourbon."

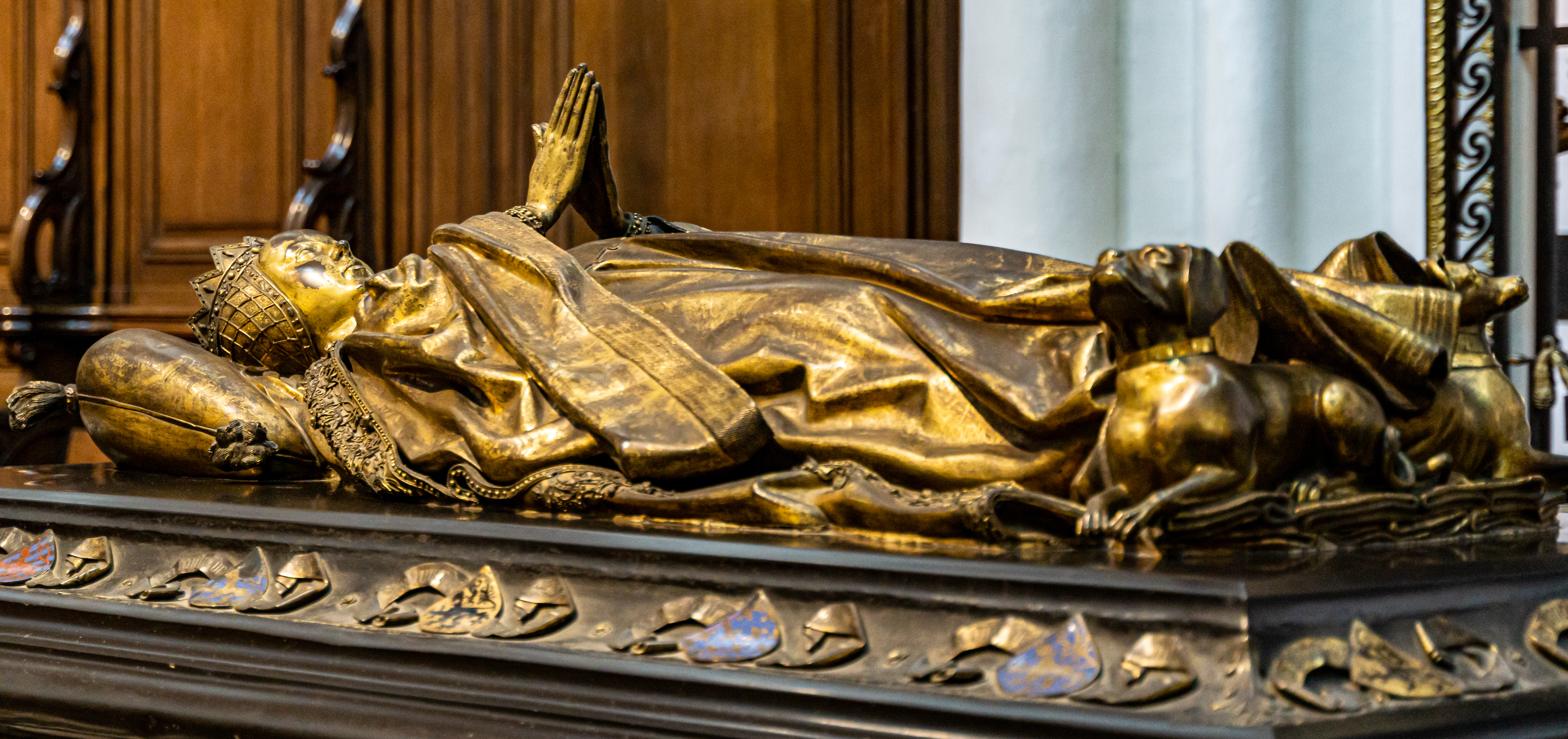
Full-length view of the effigy

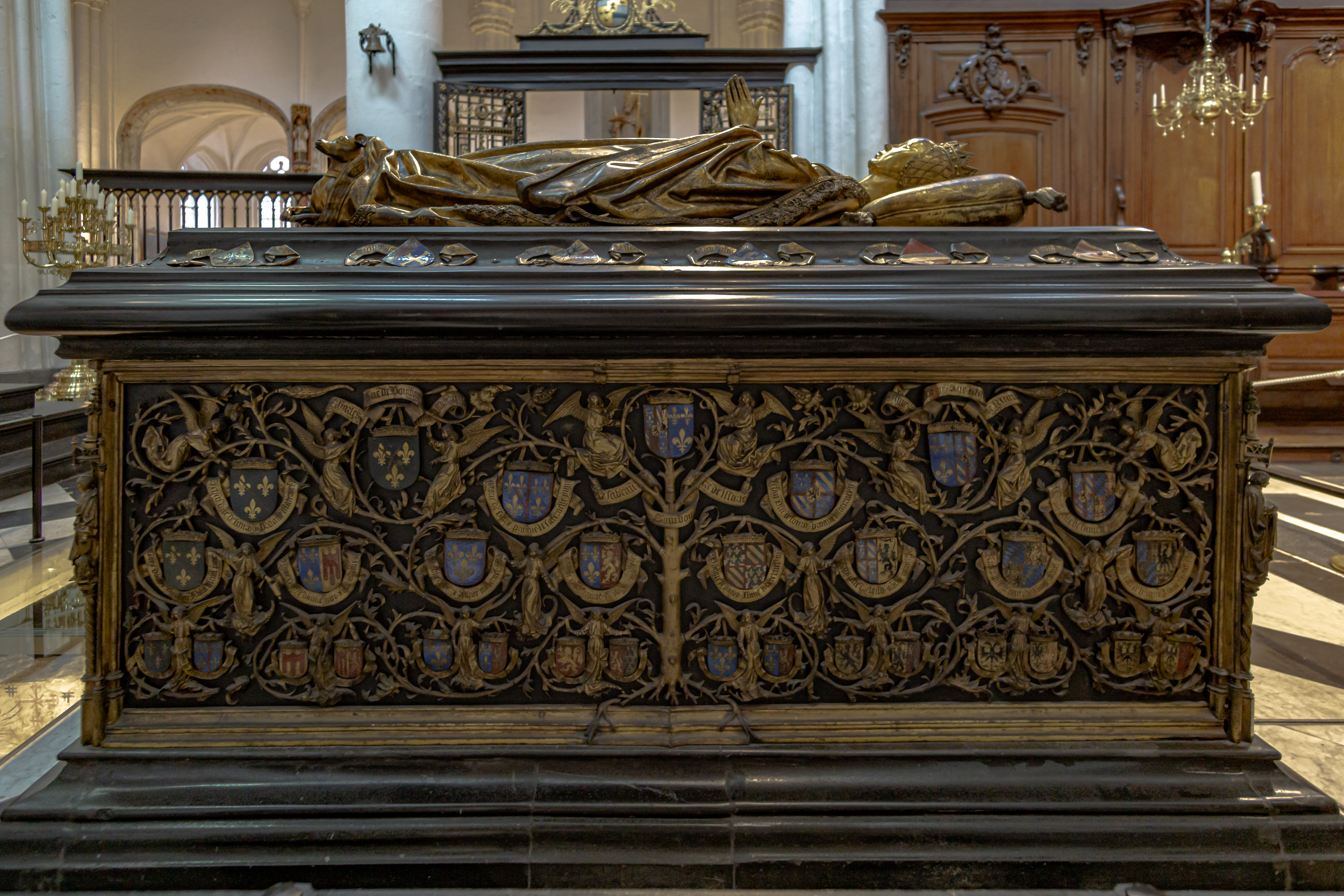
Heraldry on the monuments' right-hand side

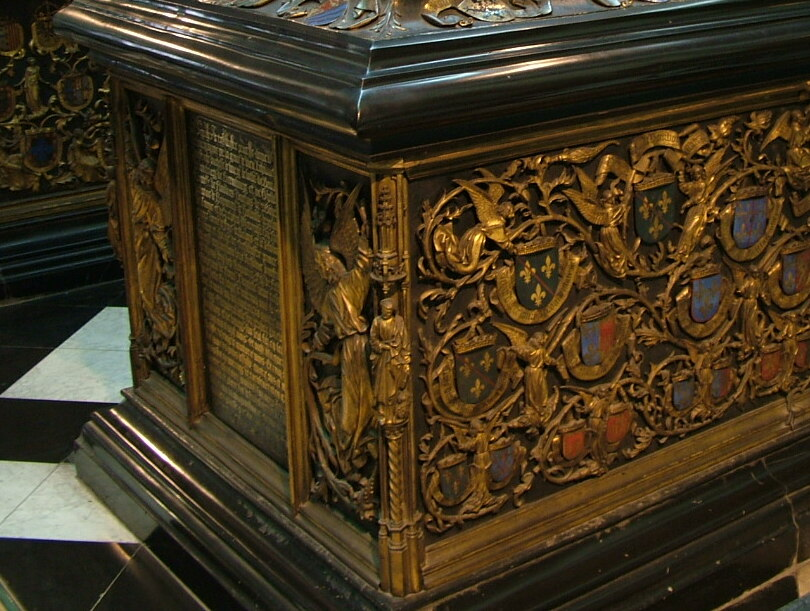
Detail

== Sources ==
- Adams, Ann; Barker, Jessica (eds). "Revisiting the Monument: Fifty Years Since Panofsky’s Tomb Sculpture Archived 2025-03-29 at the Wayback Machine". London: Courtauld Institute of Art, 2016
- Armstrong, Charles Arthur John. "The Burgundian Netherlands, 1477-1521", in: Potter, George Richard (ed), The New Cambridge Modern History volume I. Cambridge: Cambridge University Press, 1957. ISBN 978-0-5210-4541-4
- Arnade, Peter (ed). "Rereading Huizinga: Autumn of the Middle Ages, a Century Later". Amsterdam: Amsterdam University Press, 2019. ISBN 978-9-0485-3409-8
- Mikolic, Amanda. "Fashionable Mourners: Bronze Statuettes from the Rijksmuseum" (exhibition catalogue). Cleveland, OH: Cleveland Museum of Art, 2017
- Nash, Susie. Northern Renaissance art. Oxford: Oxford University Press, 2008. ISBN 978-0-1928-4269-5
- Panofsky, Ervin. Tomb Sculpture: Its Changing Aspects from Ancient Egypt to Bernini. London: Harry Abrams, 1964. ISBN 978-0-8109-3870-0
- Pegues, Emily; Smith, Dylan. "New Technical Research on the Tomb of Mary of Burgundy (Audio doc) Archived 2023-02-14 at the Wayback Machine". National Gallery of Art, 2018. Retrieved 13 February 2023.
- Roberts, Ann. "The Chronology and Political Significance of the Tomb of Mary of Burgundy". The Art Bulletin, volume 71, nr. 3, 1989. JSTOR 3051135
- Scholten, Frits. "Isabella’s Weepers: Ten Statues from a Burgundian Tomb"'. Amsterdam: Rijksmuseum, 2007. ISBN 978-9-07145-0822
- Vaughan, Richard; Paravicini, Werner. Charles the Bold: The Last Valois Duke of Burgundy. London: Barnes & Noble, 1973. ISBN 978-0-0649-7171-3
