= Church of Our Lady, Bruges =

Church of Our Lady
- Dutch: Onze-Lieve-Vrouwkerk
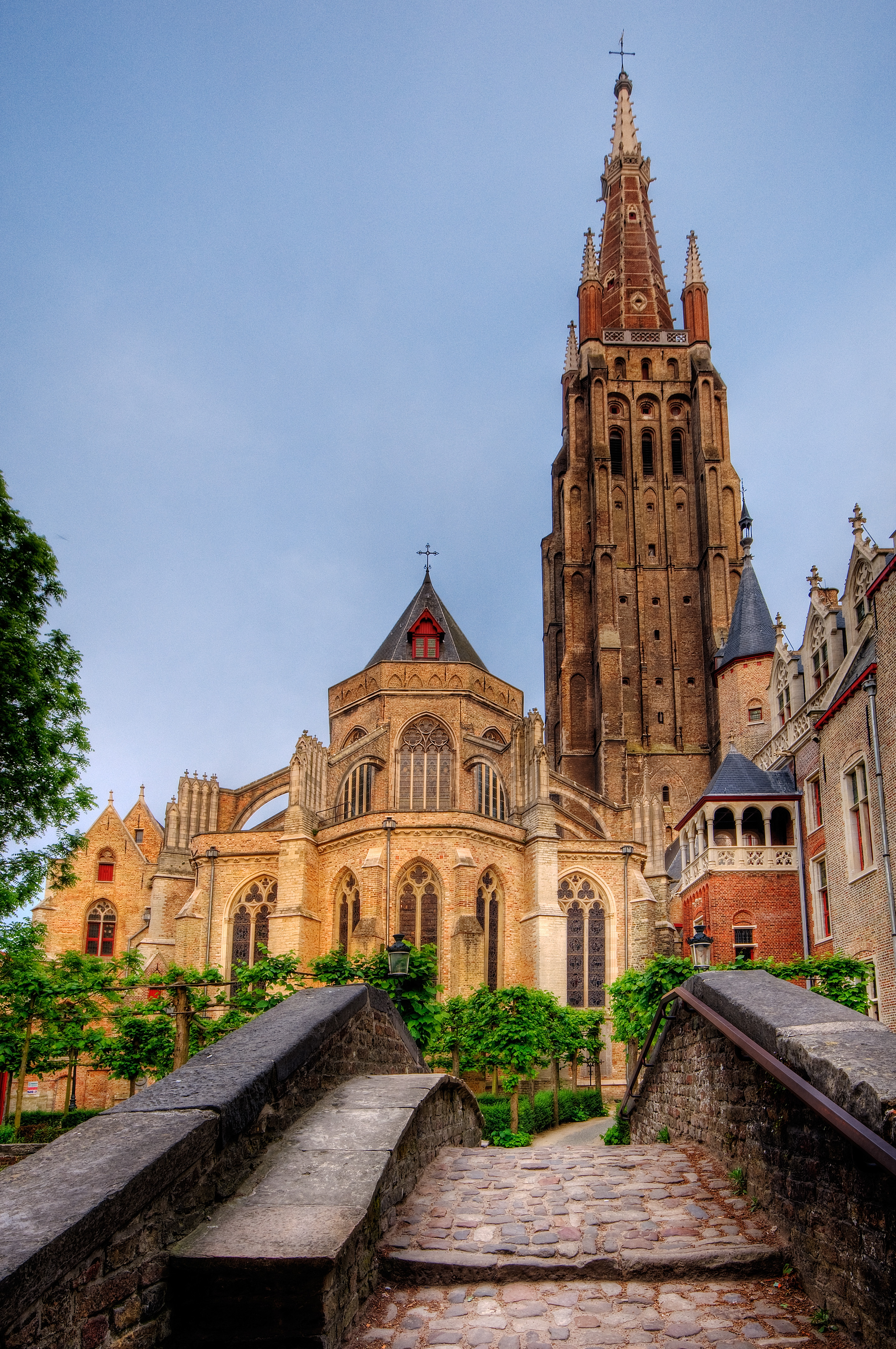
- Church of Our Lady
- Church of Our Lady
- 51°12′17″N 3°13′28″E
- Location: Bruges
- Country: Belgium
- Denomination: Roman Catholic
- Website: www.onthaalkerk-brugge.be

History
- Status: Parish church
- Dedication: Mary

Architecture
- Functional status: Active
- Architectural type: Church
- Style: Gothic
- Years built: 1270-1280 (choir); 14th/15th century (various additions)
- Groundbreaking: 13th century

Specifications
- Height: 115.6 m (379 ft 3 in)
- Materials: Brick

Administration
- Diocese: Bruges

The Church of Our Lady (Dutch: Onze-Lieve-Vrouwekerk) is a Roman Catholic church in Bruges, Belgium, dating mainly from the 13th, 14th and 15th centuries. Its 115.6-metre-high (379 ft) tower remains the tallest structure in the city and the third tallest brickwork church tower in the world (after St. Mary's Church in Lübeck and St. Martin's Church in Landshut, both in Germany).

The church demonstrates the Gothic style in the prominent Flying buttresses on the exterior which were constructed in the 1270s and 80s. The nave contains cross-vaults and black and white tiled flooring. The interior demonstrates the heavily ornamented Baroque style in the side aisles and chancel. One of the chapels in the church was created in 1482 for a wealthy man named Lodewijk van Gruuthuse, as his personal worship area.

== Burials ==
In the choir space behind the high altar are the tombs of Charles the Bold, last Valois Duke of Burgundy, and that of his daughter, the duchess Mary. The gilded bronze effigies of both father and daughter repose at full length on polished slabs of black stone. Both are crowned, and Charles is represented in full armor and wearing the decoration of the Order of the Golden Fleece. The dress and ornamentation of the bronzed Mary is consistent with the Gothic style, and around the sides of the stone is a genealogy. There is glass over the tomb opening so the frescoes on the walls are visible from above, with Jan Borman being the creator of the tomb. The heart of Philip the Handsome, Archduke of Austria and King of Castile, is interned here (though the rest of his body is buried at the Royal Chapel of Granada in Spain). The English founder of the convent at Antwerp, Mary Lovel, was buried by the high altar in 1628. She died here whilst trying to establish another convent in the city.

== Madonna and Child ==
The altarpiece of the large chapel in the southern aisle, known as the Cappella sacra created in the 18th century in the Baroque style, enshrines the most celebrated art treasure of the church—a white marble sculpture of the Madonna and Child created by Michelangelo around 1504. There is evidence of this date based on payments being made to Michelangelo by Florentine bankers Baldassare and Giovanni Balducci between 1503 and 1504. The block of marble used to sculpt the Madonna weighed close to a ton so suitable locations for carving would have been limited. It is likely that Michelangelo began carving the sculpture in Carrara, as he was there for close to a year in 1505. The Madonna was completed in 1506. It was probably meant originally for Siena Cathedral; however, it was purchased in Italy by two Brugean merchants, the brothers Jan and Alexander Mouscron. This was due to a monetary disagreement that led to Michelangelo having the statue brought privately to the Mouscrons in Bruges instead and in 1514 it was donated to its present home. The sculpture was a memorial to the Mouscron parents, "...which would include a 'sumptuous tabernacle' that would hold an 'excellent' sculpture of the Virgin that is 'very precious' and 'costly'..." No alterations are allowed to be made to the Madonna without proper permission. While Michelangelo was alive, the Madonna was the only sculpture to be taken out of Italy. The sculpture was twice recovered after being looted by foreign occupiers—French revolutionaries c. 1794 and Nazi Germans in 1944. Close to the Michelangelo statue important Brugeans are buried such as Françoise de Haveskercke, buried next to her husband in the black tomb of the Haveskercke family on the right side of the statue.

== Gallery ==
=== Exterior ===
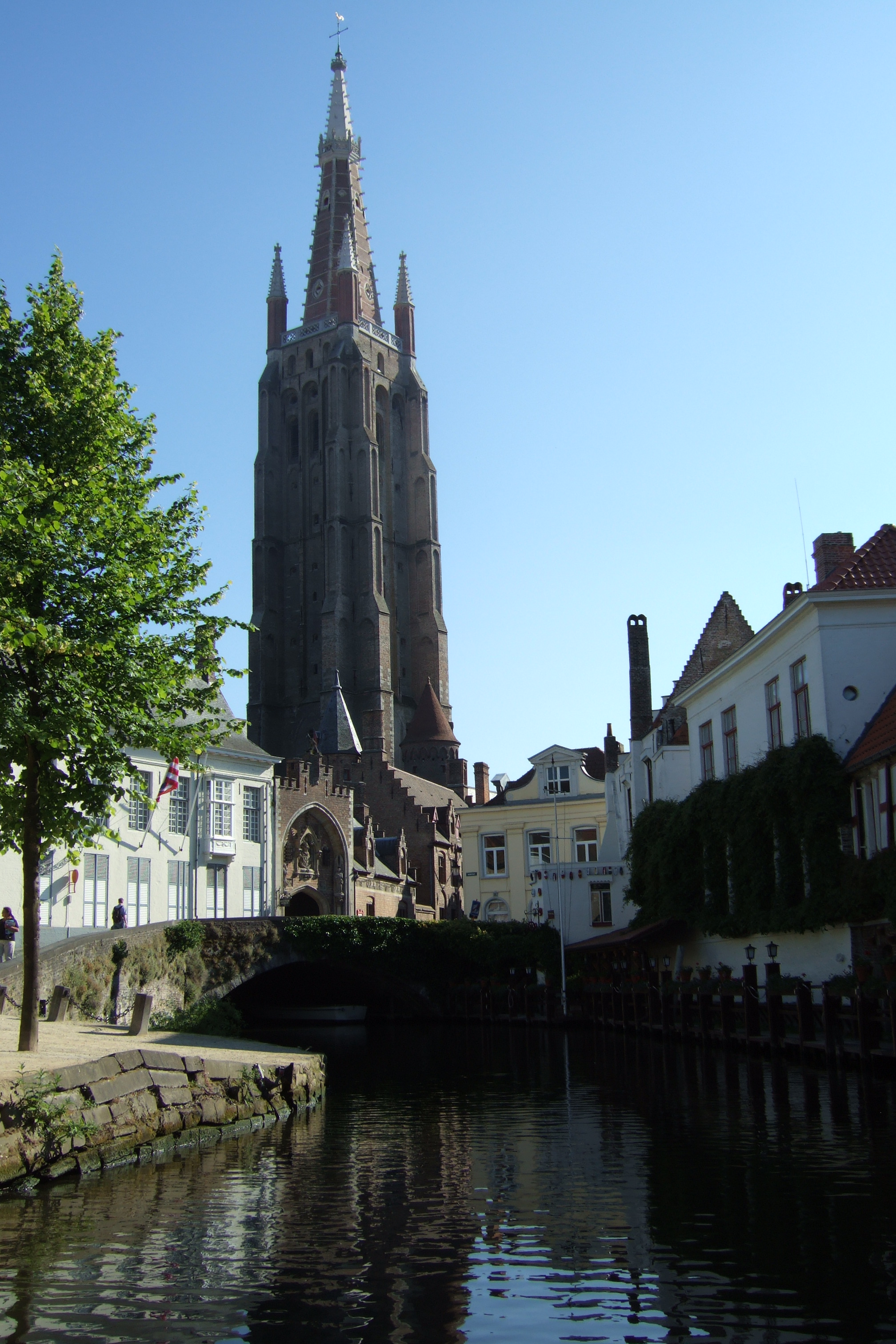
Tower, viewed from north-east

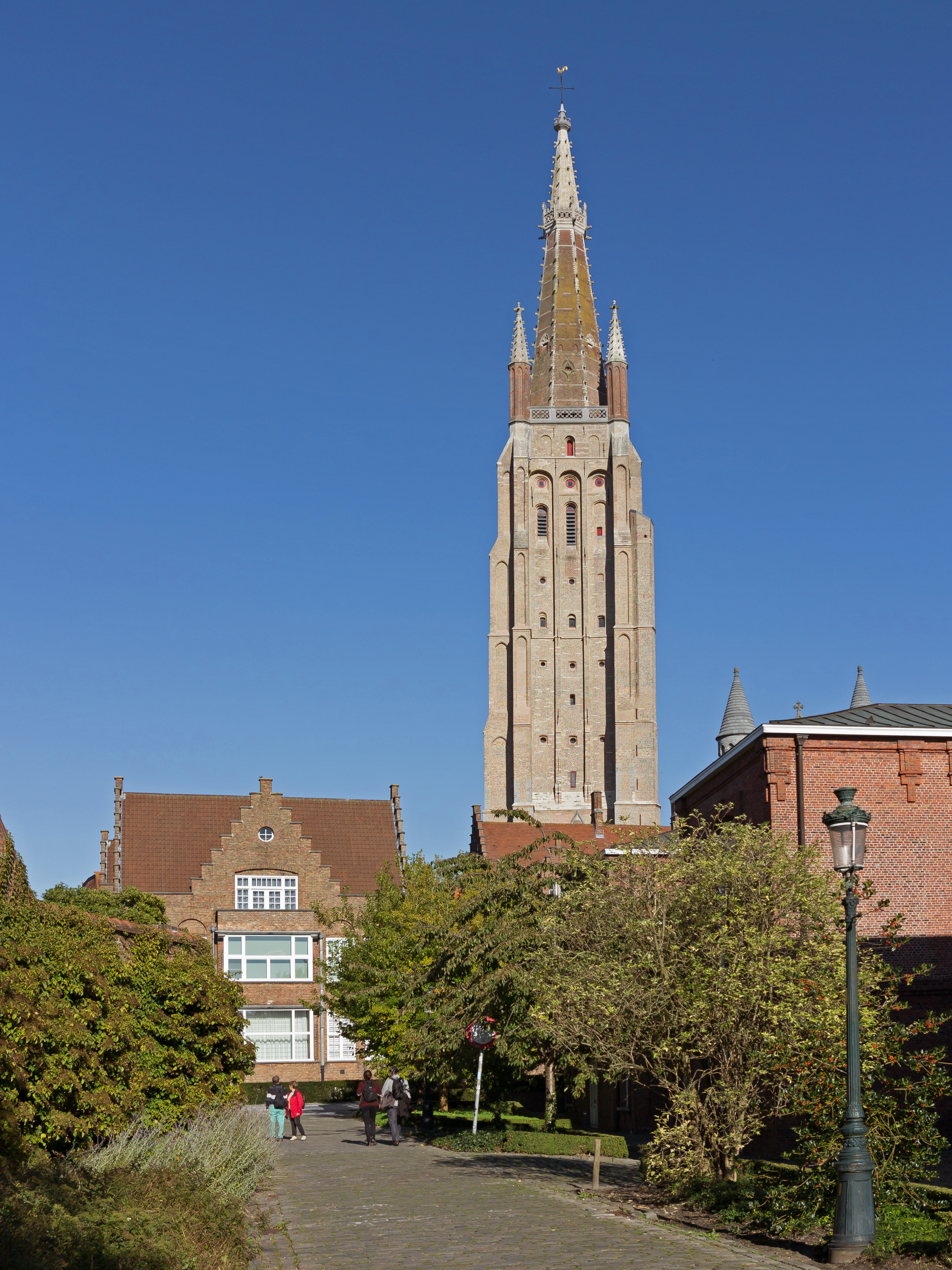
Another view of the tower

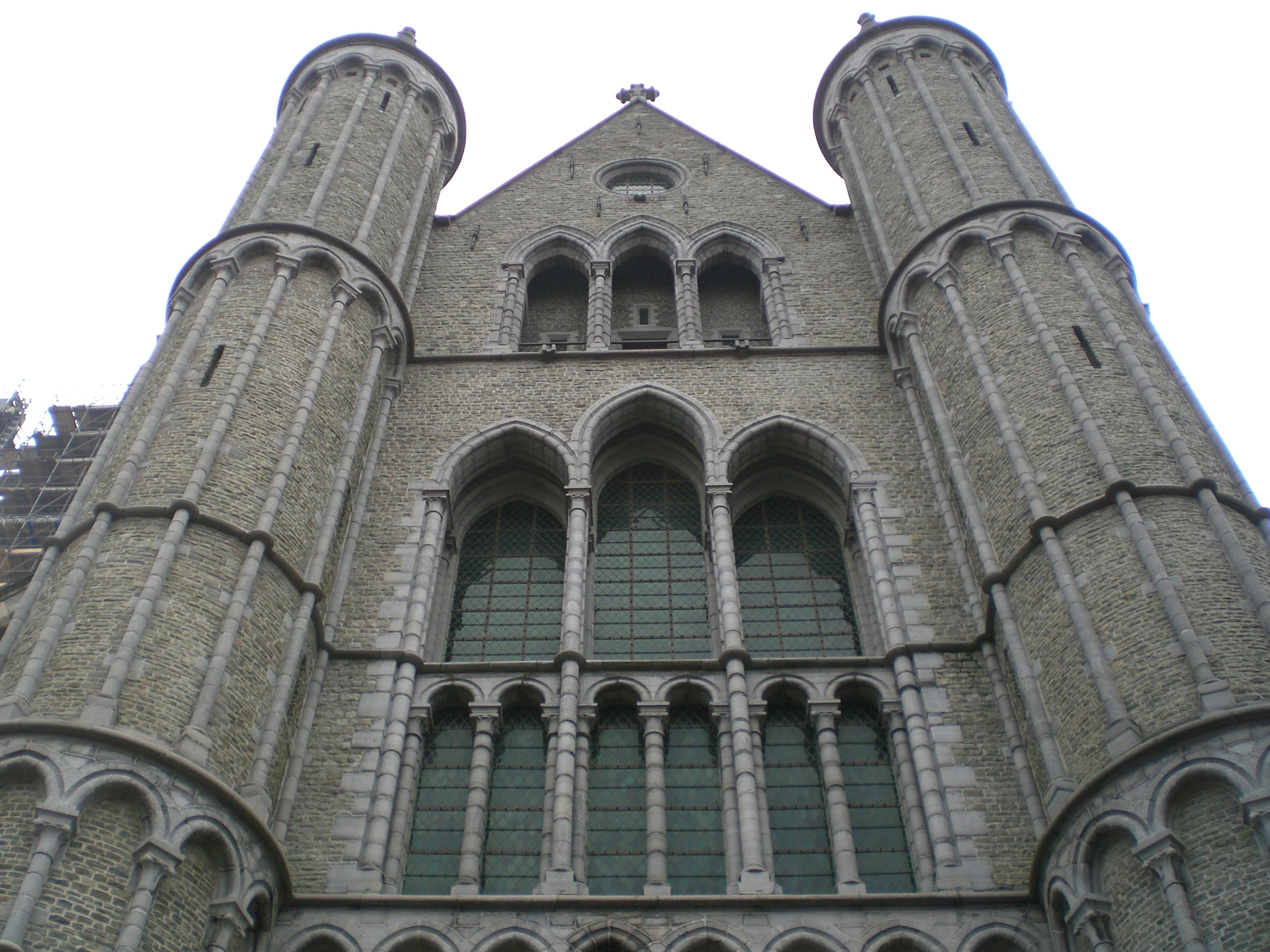
Facade

=== Interior ===
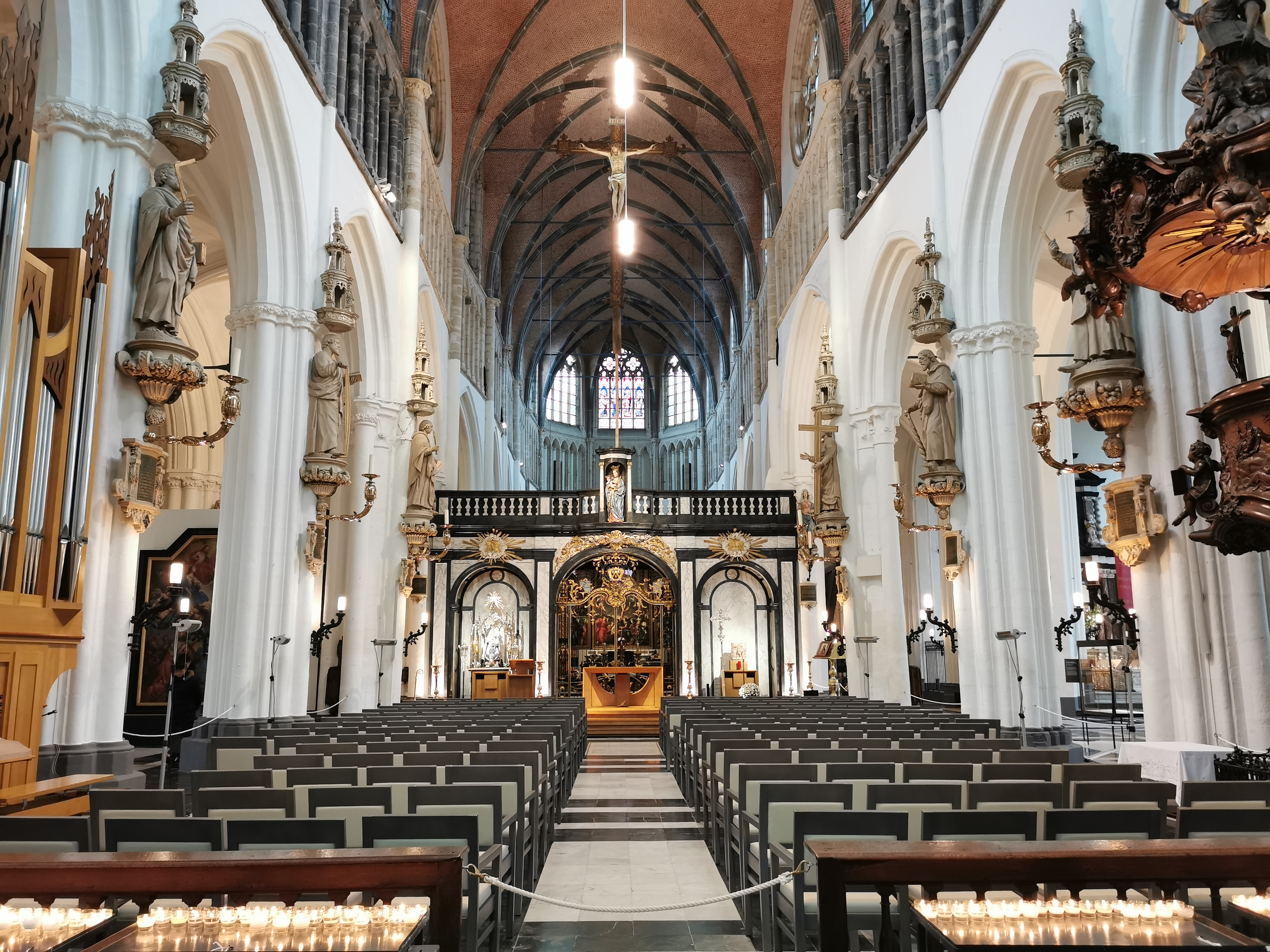
Nave

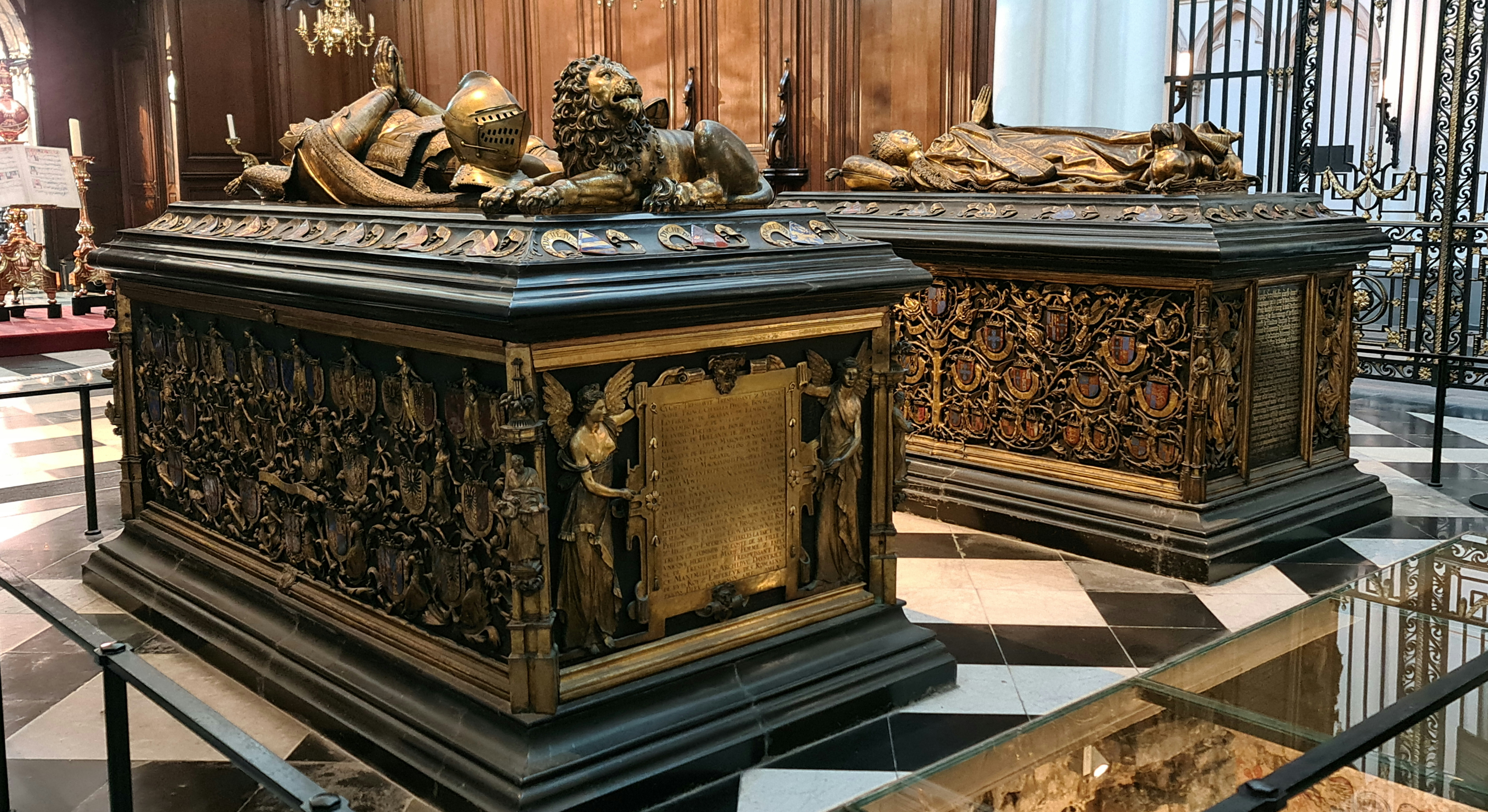
Tombs of Charles the Bold and Mary of Burgundy

=== Works of art ===
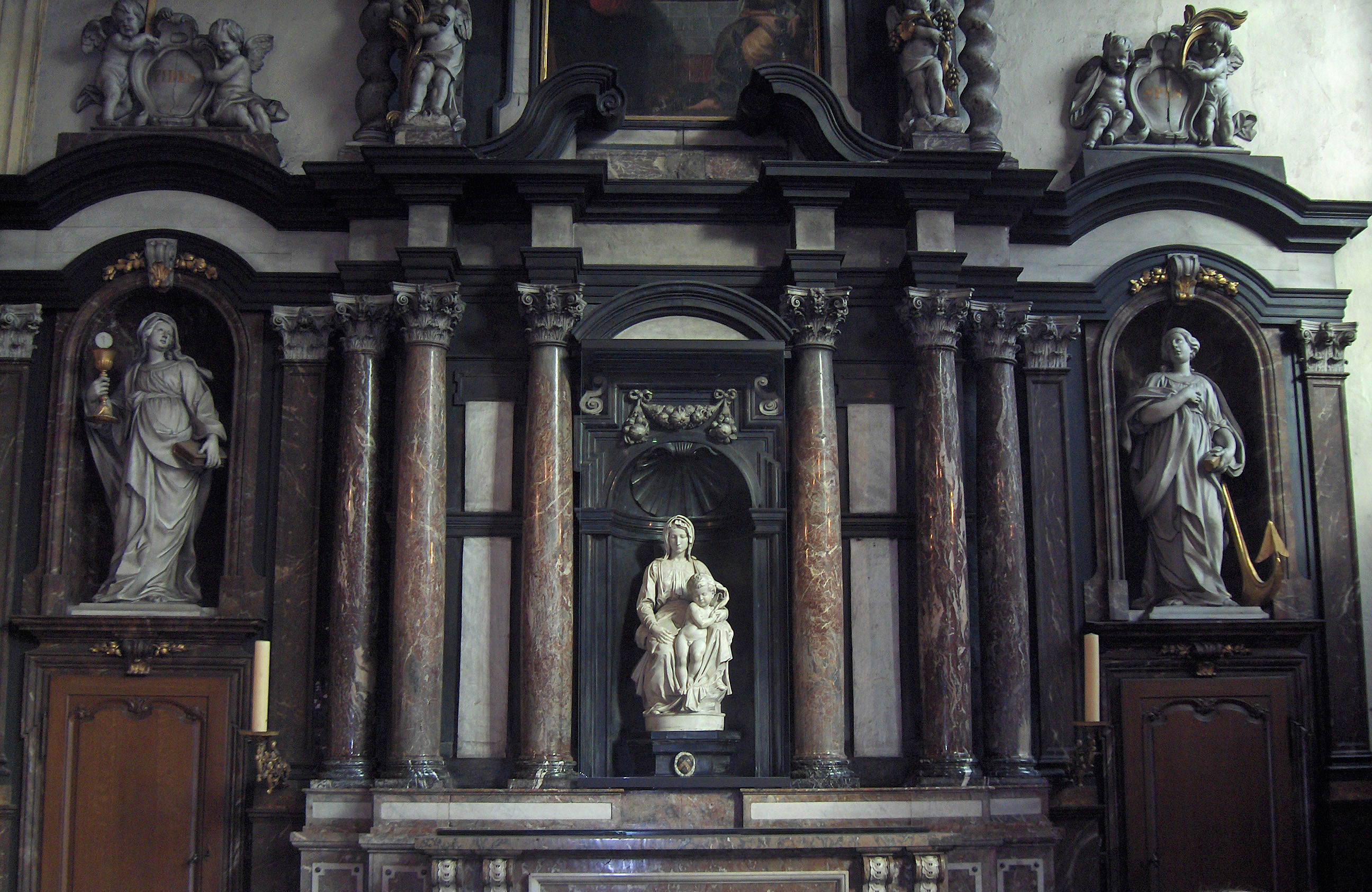
Madonna by Michelangelo, 1501-1504

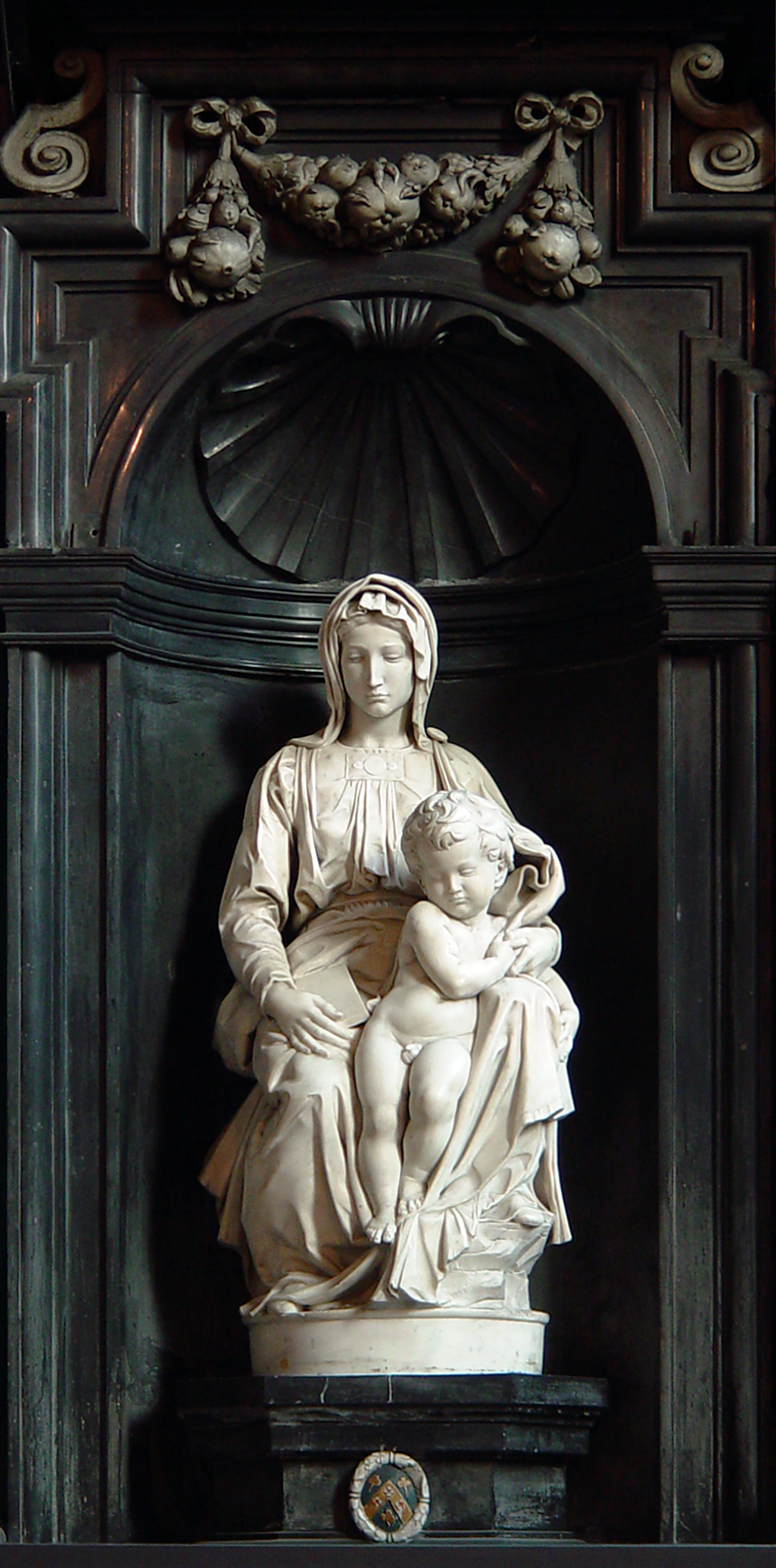
Madonna by Michelangelo

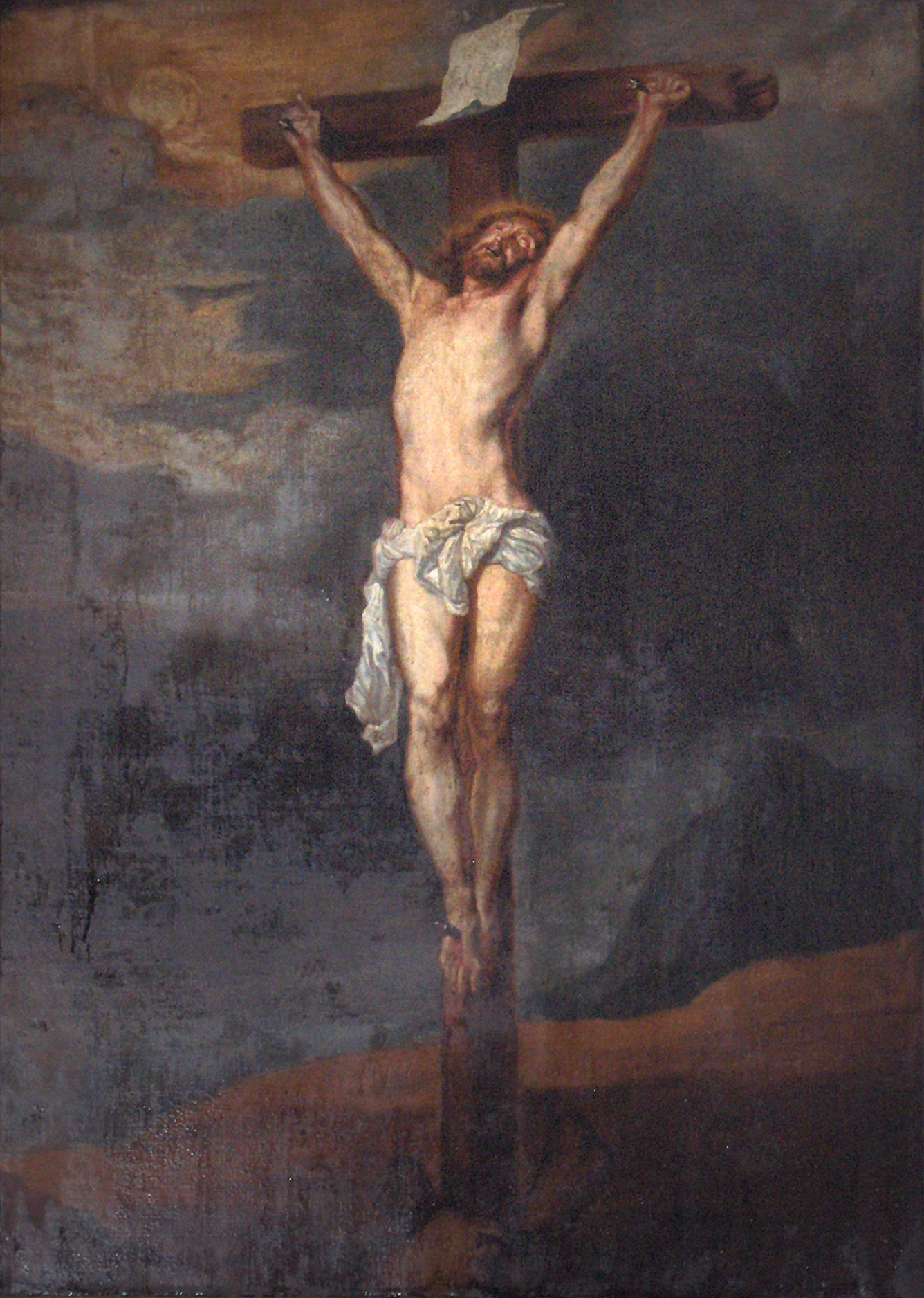
Crucifixion by Anthony van Dyck, 1626

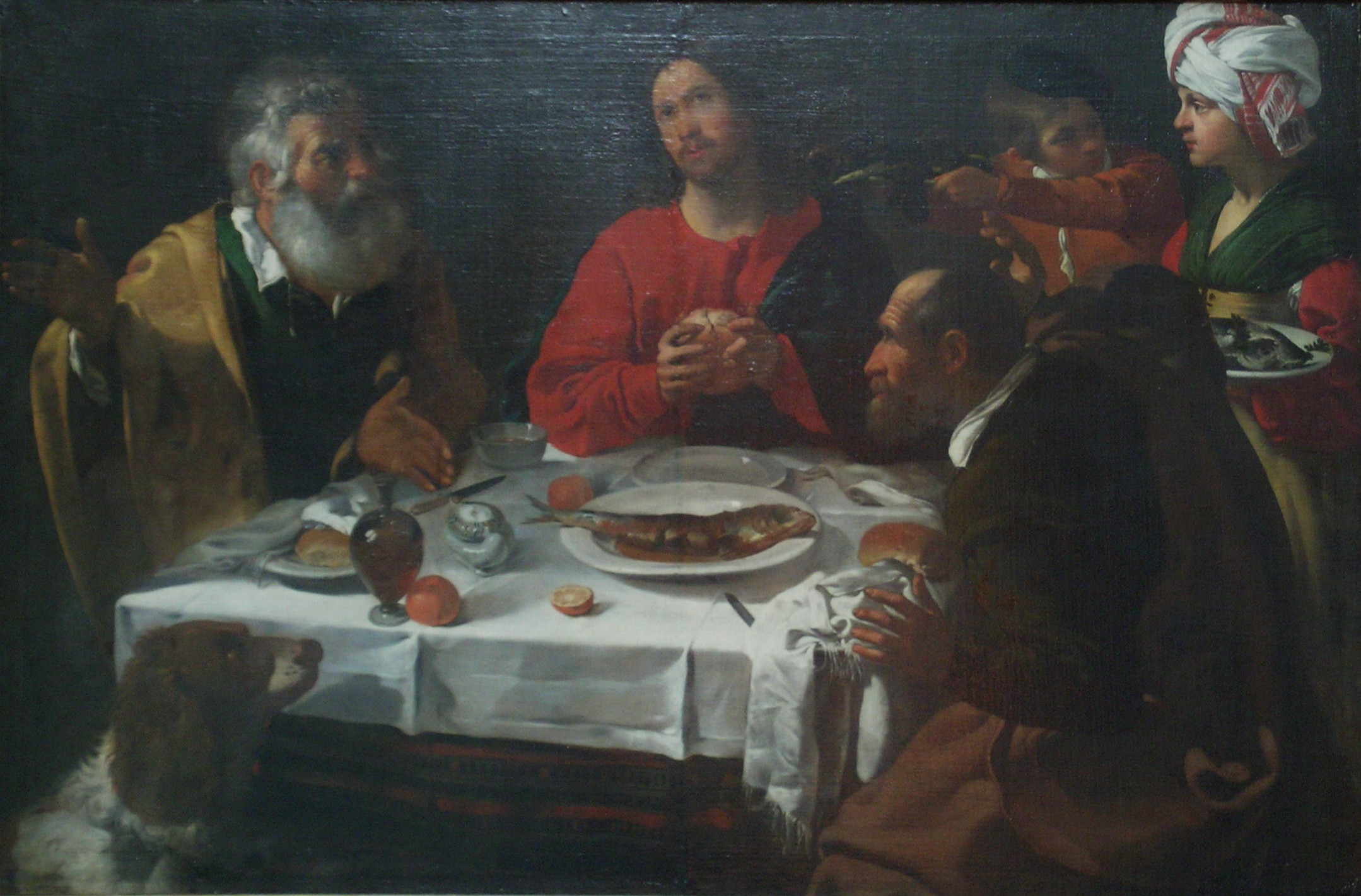
Supper at Emmaüs, formerly ascribed to Caravaggio

Deposition of the Cross; anonymous

== See also ==
- List of Gothic cathedrals in Europe
- List of tallest structures built before the 20th century

== Sources ==
- Bumpus, T. Francis (1909), The Cathedrals and Churches of Belgium [The Cathedral Series; 16], London: T[homas] W[erner] Laurie, pp. 138–144, ISBN 9780300014129, OCLC 221948162.
- Hobbs, Jerry R. (9 January 2004), A Michelangelo in Belgium? The Bruges Madonna, Information Sciences Institute, USC Viterbi School of Engineering, University of Southern California, archived from the original on 8 June 2014.
- [Onze-Lieve-Vrouwekerk] (in Dutch), Kerknet Vlaanderen, archived from the original on 14 April 2012.
