= 2015 Malmö FF season =

Malmö FF
2015 season
- Chairman: Håkan Jeppsson
- Head coach: Åge Hareide
- Stadium: Swedbank Stadion
- Allsvenskan: 5th
- 2014–15 Svenska Cupen: Quarter-finals
- 2015–16 UEFA Champions League: Group stage
- Top goalscorer: League: Markus Rosenberg (11); All: Markus Rosenberg (16)
- Highest home attendance: 22,337 vs. AIK (9 April 2015, Allsvenskan)
- Lowest home attendance: 3,646 vs. Jönköpings Södra IF (7 March 2015, Svenska Cupen)
- Average home league attendance: 17,332 (in Allsvenskan); 16,153 (in all competitions)
Home colours	Away colours	Third colours

The 2015 season was Malmö FF's 104th in existence, their 80th season in Allsvenskan and their 15th consecutive season in the league. They competed in Allsvenskan where they finished fifth, 2014–15 Svenska Cupen where they were knocked out in the quarter-finals and the 2015–16 UEFA Champions League where they were knocked out in the group stage. Malmö FF also participated in one competition in which the club continued playing in for the 2016 season, 2015–16 Svenska Cupen. The season began with the group stage of Svenska Cupen on 22 February, league play started on 6 April and concluded on 31 October. The season concluded with the last Champions League group stage match on 8 December.

Markus Rosenberg was appointed permanent club captain, succeeding Guillermo Molins, who he had temporarily replaced during the summer of 2014 due to Molins being injured. For the first time in the history of the club, Malmö FF appeared in consecutive UEFA Champions League group stages. The club was not as successful on the domestic stage as they failed to defend their title by finishing fifth in the league. This was the first time that Malmö FF missed out on the top-four since the 2009 season.

== Summary ==
=== Allsvenskan ===
The league season started on 6 April 2015 and concluded on 31 October 2015. The official season fixtures were released on 21 January 2015. Malmö FF started the season away against newly promoted GIF Sundsvall on 6 April, Malmö FF won the match 4–1. The club's first home fixture was played on 9 April against last year's third-place team AIK, the match ended in a goalless draw. There was a one-month summer break in June due to Sweden's participation in the 2015 UEFA European Under-21 Championship in the Czech Republic. Malmö FF played no league matches between 7 June and 5 July. The club played its last league fixture of the season at home against IFK Norrköping on 31 October, a 2–0 defeat which saw Norrköping become league champions.

The club got off to a fairly promising start, winning three of the first five games against GIF Sundsvall, title contenders and rivals IFK Göteborg and newly promoted Hammarby IF. Out of these first five games Malmö FF also tied against title rivals AIK and Falkenbergs FF. Notably Malmö FF dropped pole position in the league to Gefle IF on 9 April in the second round of play. The club had held first place in the league since 18 August 2013 for a continuous streak of 599 days, never losing the lead during the victorious 2014 season. Malmö FF continued to win the following two games at home against Halmstads BK and regional rivals Helsingborgs IF. These two wins solidified the club's position as league leaders after seven rounds of play.

The following three matches resulted in a win-less streak of a draw and two losses in a row. Malmö FF first tied the away fixture against IF Elfsborg after a late equaliser from the home side. This was succeeded by defeats against BK Häcken and Kalmar FF, notably the last time Malmö FF won against Häcken was as far back as in October 2011. This was the first time since September 2014 that the club failed to win in three games and the first time since June 2011 that they lost two league matches in succession. This streak was followed by back to back wins against Åtvidabergs FF and Gefle IF and a home draw against Djurgårdens IF. This meant that Malmö FF took up fourth position in the league table at the time of the summer break, seven points behind leaders IFK Göteborg.

When Allsvenskan restarted in July, Malmö FF experienced another struggling period as they failed to win any of the first three matches after the break, an away loss against IFK Norrköping and two consecutive draws against Örebro SK. This was followed by a four-match undefeated streak in which Malmö FF defeated GIF Sundsvall, league leaders IFK Göteborg, Gefle and drew against Åtvidaberg. After 20 rounds of play, Malmö FF was in fifth place in the league, four points behind IFK Göteborg in first place. In the next-coming five games, the club won three, drew one and lost one. By 25 rounds the gap to the trio of leading teams had increased to seven points and Malmö FF was now forth, one point ahead of Elfsborg.

With five matches remaining, Malmö FF still had a realistic chance of retaining the title if they won the remaining fixtures. That chance quickly vanished with a goalless draw away at Halmstad and an away loss against fellow title contender AIK in the 27th round. The primary focus for Malmö FF now was to reach a fourth-place finish. After wins against Kalmar and Hammarby in the 28th and 29th round respectively, Malmö FF had a two-point advantage over Elfsborg for fourth place. In the last round, Malmö FF played a home fixture against league leaders IFK Norrköping. A draw would have sufficed for Malmö FF to clinch fourth place, but a motivated Norrköping won the match 2–0 and captured their first league title in 26 years. Since Elfsborg won their last match, Malmö FF ended the season in fifth place.

=== Svenska Cupen ===
Malmö FF qualified for the group stage of the 2014–15 Svenska Cupen in the 2014 season by beating IS Halmia 2–1 on 15 November 2014. The club were seeded first in the group stage draw after finishing first in the 2014 Allsvenskan. The groups were drawn on 19 November 2014. Malmö FF drew Jönköpings Södra IF who finished fourth in Superettan for the 2014 season, Assyriska FF who finished 14th in the same league and Hudiksvalls FF who finished second in Division 2 Norrland.

The group stage was played between 22 February and 7 March 2015 before the start of the league season. Malmö FF beat Assyriska 3–0 in the opening group fixture at Malmö IP on 22 February 2015. In the second round, the club travelled to Hudiksvall and won 5–0 on 28 February 2015. In the last group match Malmö FF faced Jönköpings Södra at Malmö IP and won 4–0 on 7 March 2015. These results positioned Malmö FF top of the group table and the club advanced to the quarter-finals.

The quarter finals were drawn on 9 March 2015, Malmö FF were drawn against fellow Allsvenskan team Örebro SK who finished in sixth place last year. Malmö FF were seeded in the drawn and had home advantage for the fixture which was played at Malmö IP on 14 March 2015. Malmö FF lost the fixture 1–0 and were therefore knocked out of the competition.

The draw for the second round of the 2015–16 Svenska Cupen was held on 7 August 2015. Malmö FF were drawn against Götene IF, a side that played in Division 3 Mellersta Götaland, the match was played on 8 November 2015. The fixture was postponed until after the league season since Malmö FF were still active in the qualification campaign for the 2015–16 UEFA Champions League. Malmö FF won the match 5–0 and progressed to next season's group stage.

=== UEFA Champions League ===
Malmö FF qualified for the 2015–16 UEFA Champions League by merit of finishing first in the 2014 Allsvenskan. The club entered the competition in the second round of qualification. The draw for the second qualifying round was held on 22 June, Malmö FF was seeded in the draw. The club was drawn against the 2014 Lithuanian champions FC Žalgiris. This will be the first time that Malmö FF face Lithuanian opposition in European competition. The first leg of the second round was played on 15 July at Swedbank Stadion in Malmö, the match ended in a goalless draw. The second leg was played on 21 July at the LFF Stadium in Vilnius, Malmö FF won the match 1–0 and advanced to the third qualifying round with an aggregate score of 1–0.

The draw for the third round of qualification was held on 17 July 2015, Malmö FF were unseeded in the draw. The club was drawn against the 2014–15 Austrian champions Red Bull Salzburg. This was the second consecutive season that Malmö FF played Salzburg as they met in last year's play-off round where Malmö FF advanced to the group stage with an aggregate score of 4–2. The first leg of the third round was played on 29 July at Red Bull Arena in Wals-Siezenheim where Salzburg came out victorious 2–0. The second leg was played on 5 August at Swedbank Stadion in Malmö, Malmö FF won the match 3–0 and advanced to the play-off round with an aggregate score of 3–2.

The draw for the play-off round was held on 7 August 2015, Malmö FF were unseeded in the draw. The club was drawn against the 2014–15 Scottish champions Celtic. This was fourth time that Malmö FF faced Scottish opposition in Europe, the first since the 2011 season in the UEFA Champions League when Malmö FF beat Rangers in the third qualifying round with an aggregate score of 2–1. The first leg of the play-off round was played on 19 August at Celtic Park. Celtic won the first match 3–2, Malmö FF managed to keep down the score after being down 2–0 and 3–1. The second leg was played on 25 August at Swedbank Stadion. Malmö FF won the return tie 2–0 and the tie ended with an aggregate score of 4–3. With this result they progressed to the group stage for the second consecutive season.

The draw for the group stage was held on 27 August 2015 in Monaco, France. Malmö FF were seeded in pot 4 which consisted of the lowest ranked teams. The club was drawn against Spanish runners-up Real Madrid, French champions Paris Saint-Germain and Ukrainian runners-up Shakhtar Donetsk. Malmö FF played their first match of the group stage, an away fixture against Paris Saint-Germain on 15 September, and concluded the group stage on 8 December with an away fixture against Real Madrid. In the six group stage matches Malmö FF gathered three points and ended up in fourth place, thus being knocked out of the Champions League and further European competition for the 2015–16 season. In the six matches the club won one match, the home fixture against Shakhtar Donetsk 1–0, and lost the other five matches. Shakhtar Donetsk was also the only team that Malmö FF managed to score against.

== Key events ==
- 30 October 2014: Defender Matias Concha retires.
- 13 November 2014: Midfielder Erik Andersson joins the club on a four-year contract, transferring from Landskrona BoIS. Midfielder Oscar Lewicki joins the club on a three-year contract, transferring from BK Häcken.
- 19 November 2014: Defender Tobias Malm leaves the club.
- 26 November 2014: Forward Petter Thelin leaves the club, transferring to Kramfors-Alliansen.
- 12 December 2014: Midfielder Simon Thern leaves the club, transferring to Heerenveen.
- 13 December 2014: Defender Ricardinho leaves the club, transferring to Gabala.
- 15 December 2014: Forward Magnus Eriksson leaves the club, transferring to Guizhou Renhe.
- 19 December 2014: Goalkeeper Marko Johansson is promoted to the first team squad on a youth contract basis, signing a two-year contract to keep him at the club until the end of the 2016 season. Defender Franz Brorsson is promoted to the first team squad on a youth contract basis, signing a two-year contract to keep him at the club until the end of the 2016 season.
- 7 January 2015: Midfielder Emil Forsberg leaves the club, transferring to RB Leipzig.
- 12 January 2015: Midfielder Markus Halsti leaves the club, transferring to D.C. United.
- 13 January 2015: Defender Alexander Blomqvist leaves the club on loan to IFK Värnamo for the duration of the season.
- 14 January 2015: Midfielder Tobias Sana joins the club on a four-year contract, transferring from Ajax.
- 19 January 2015: Midfielder Jo Inge Berget joins the club on a three-year contract, transferring from Cardiff City.
- 22 January 2015: Forward Isaac Kiese Thelin leaves the club, transferring to Bordeaux.
- 23 January 2015: Forward Benjamin Fadi leaves the club on loan to Mjällby AIF for the duration of the season. Goalkeeper Sixten Mohlin leaves the club on loan to Västerås SK for the duration of the season.
- 26 January 2015: Midfielder Magnus Wolff Eikrem joins the club on a three-year contract, transferring from Cardiff City.
- 27 January 2015: Defender Yoshimar Yotún joins the club on a three-year contract, transferring from Sporting Cristal.
- 11 February 2015: Midfielder Amin Nazari leaves the club on loan to Fredrikstad for the duration of the season.
- 13 February 2015: Forward Markus Rosenberg is chosen as the club's new captain.
- 11 March 2015: Defender Andreas Vindheim joins the club on a four-year contract, transferring from Brann.
- 13 March 2015: Defender Johan Hammar leaves the club on loan to Fredrikstad for the duration of the season.
- 20 March 2015: Midfielder Piotr Johansson leaves the club on loan to Ängelholms FF for the duration of the season.
- 25 March 2015: Defender Rasmus Bengtsson joins the club on a five-year contract, transferring from FC Twente.
- 31 March 2015: Midfielder Petar Petrović leaves the club on loan to IFK Värnamo until 15 July 2015.
- 10 April 2015: Forward Markus Rosenberg signs a new three-year contract, keeping him at the club until the end of the 2017 season.
- 29 June 2015: Defender Kári Árnason joins the club on a two-and-a-half-year contract, transferring from Rotherham United.
- 1 July 2015: Goalkeeper Robin Olsen leaves the club, transferring to PAOK.
- 8 July 2015: Midfielder Vladimir Rodić joins the club on a three-and-a-half-year contract, transferring from Rad.
- 9 July 2015: Defender Erik Johansson leaves the club, transferring to Gent.
- 11 July 2015: Defender Felipe Carvalho joins the club on a two-and-a-half-year contract, transferring from Tacuarembó.
- 17 July 2015: Forward Nikola Đurđić joins the club on a six months loan contract, transferring from Augsburg.
- 22 July 2015: Goalkeeper Johan Wiland joins the club on a two-and-a-half-year contract, transferring from Copenhagen.
- 22 July 2015: Defender Filip Helander leaves the club, transferring to Hellas Verona.
- 27 July 2015: Goalkeeper Fredrik Andersson joins the club on a one-and-a-half-year contract, with an option to extend the contract for one year, transferring from Örgryte IS. Midfielder Mattias Svanberg is promoted to the first team squad on a youth contract basis, signing a one-and-a-half-year contract to keep him at the club until the end of the 2016 season.
- 14 October 2015: Forward Teddy Bergqvist is promoted to the first team squad on a youth contract basis, signing a two-year contract to keep him at the club until the end of the 2017 season.

== Players ==
=== Squad ===
Note: Flags indicate national team as defined under FIFA eligibility rules; some limited exceptions apply. Players may hold more than one non-FIFA nationality.

No.	Pos.	Nation	Player
1	GK	SWE	Johan Wiland
2	DF	SWE	Pa Konate
3	DF	SWE	Anton Tinnerholm
4	DF	SWE	Filip Helander
5	MF	SWE	Erdal Rakip
6	MF	SWE	Oscar Lewicki
7	MF	SWE	Simon Kroon
8	MF	GHA	Enoch Kofi Adu
9	FW	SWE	Markus Rosenberg (captain)
10	MF	SWE	Guillermo Molins
11	FW	ALB	Agon Mehmeti
13	DF	PER	Yoshimar Yotún
14	MF	SWE	Erik Andersson
15	MF	POL	Paweł Cibicki
17	DF	SWE	Rasmus Bengtsson
18	MF	SWE	Petar Petrović
19	MF	NOR	Magnus Wolff Eikrem

No.	Pos.	Nation	Player
20	MF	MNE	Vladimir Rodić
21	DF	SWE	Erik Johansson
21	DF	ISL	Kári Árnason (vice captain)
22	MF	SWE	Tobias Sana
23	MF	NOR	Jo Inge Berget
24	DF	TUR	Mahmut Özen
25	GK	SWE	Robin Olsen
25	DF	URU	Felipe Carvalho
26	DF	NOR	Andreas Vindheim
27	GK	SWE	Zlatan Azinović
28	FW	SRB	Nikola Đurđić (on loan from Augsburg)
29	GK	SWE	Fredrik Andersson
30	GK	SWE	Marko Johansson
31	DF	SWE	Franz Brorsson
32	MF	SWE	Mattias Svanberg
33	FW	SWE	Teddy Bergqvist

=== Squad stats ===
Number	Position	Name	2015 Allsvenskan		2014–15 Svenska Cupen 2015–16 Svenska Cupen		2015–16 UEFA Champions League		Total	
Number	Position	Name	Appearances	Goals	Appearances	Goals	Appearances	Goals	Appearances	Goals
1	GK	Johan Wiland	14	0	1	0	10	0	25	0
2	DF	Pa Konate	10	0	1	0	3	0	14	0
3	DF	Anton Tinnerholm	28	0	5	1	12	1	45	2
5	MF	Erdal Rakip	20	1	2	0	10	0	32	1
6	MF	Oscar Lewicki	27	2	4	0	12	0	43	2
7	MF	Simon Kroon	6	1	3	1	3	0	12	2
8	MF	Enoch Kofi Adu	27	2	5	0	10	0	42	2
9	FW	Markus Rosenberg	28	11	4	2	10	3	42	16
10	MF	Guillermo Molins	7	0	0	0	0	0	7	0
11	FW	Agon Mehmeti	15	2	3	1	4	0	22	3
13	DF	Yoshimar Yotún	24	1	4	0	10	0	38	1
14	MF	Erik Andersson	0	0	1	0	0	0	1	0
15	MF	Paweł Cibicki	9	3	4	0	1	0	14	3
17	DF	Rasmus Bengtsson	16	1	1	0	10	0	27	1
18	MF	Petar Petrović	0	0	0	0	0	0	0	0
19	MF	Magnus Wolff Eikrem	28	7	5	3	7	0	40	10
20	MF	Vladimir Rodić	13	4	1	2	10	1	24	7
21	DF	Kári Árnason	13	1	1	0	9	0	23	1
22	MF	Tobias Sana	19	0	4	1	5	0	28	1
23	MF	Jo Inge Berget	27	9	5	4	12	2	44	15
24	DF	Mahmut Özen	0	0	0	0	0	0	0	0
25	DF	Felipe Carvalho	11	2	0	0	7	0	18	2
26	DF	Andreas Vindheim	10	0	0	0	1	0	11	0
27	GK	Zlatan Azinović	3	0	0	0	2	0	5	0
28	FW	Nikola Đurđić	12	5	0	0	10	1	22	6
29	GK	Fredrik Andersson	0	0	1	0	0	0	1	0
30	GK	Marko Johansson	0	0	0	0	1	0	1	0
31	DF	Franz Brorsson	8	0	0	0	3	0	11	0
32	MF	Mattias Svanberg	0	0	1	0	0	0	1	0
33	FW	Teddy Bergqvist	0	0	0	0	0	0	0	0
Players that left the club during the season
4	DF	Filip Helander	12	0	4	1	0	0	16	1
21	DF	Erik Johansson	13	2	4	0	0	0	17	2
25	GK	Robin Olsen	13	0	4	0	0	0	17	0

=== Players in/out ===
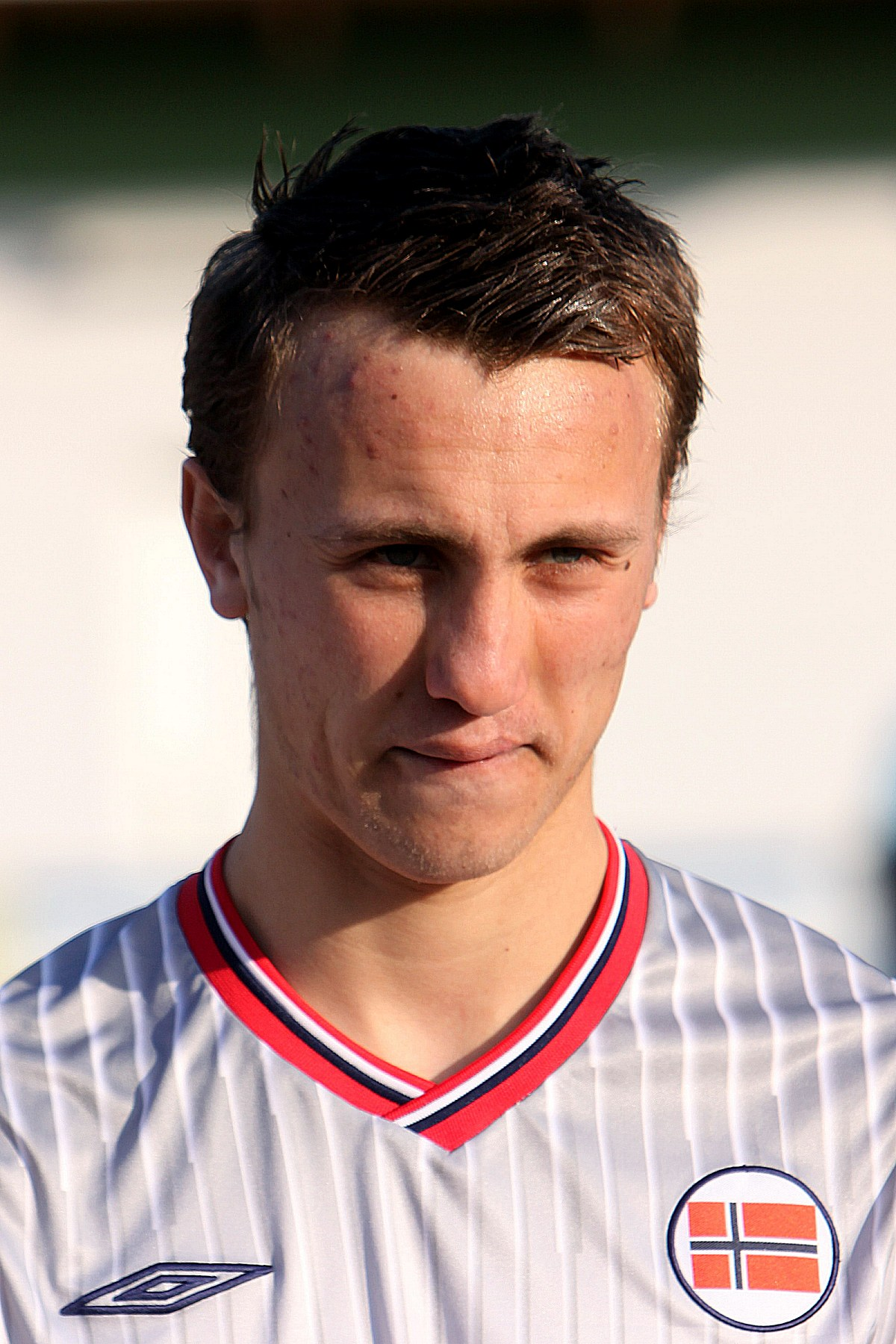
Midfielder Magnus Wolff Eikrem joined on a three-year contract from Welsh club Cardiff City.

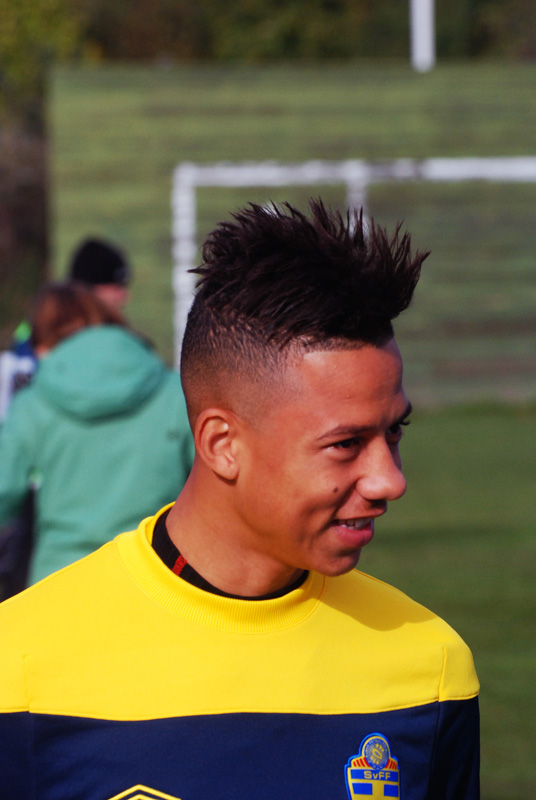
Midfielder Tobias Sana joined on a four-year contract from Dutch club Ajax.

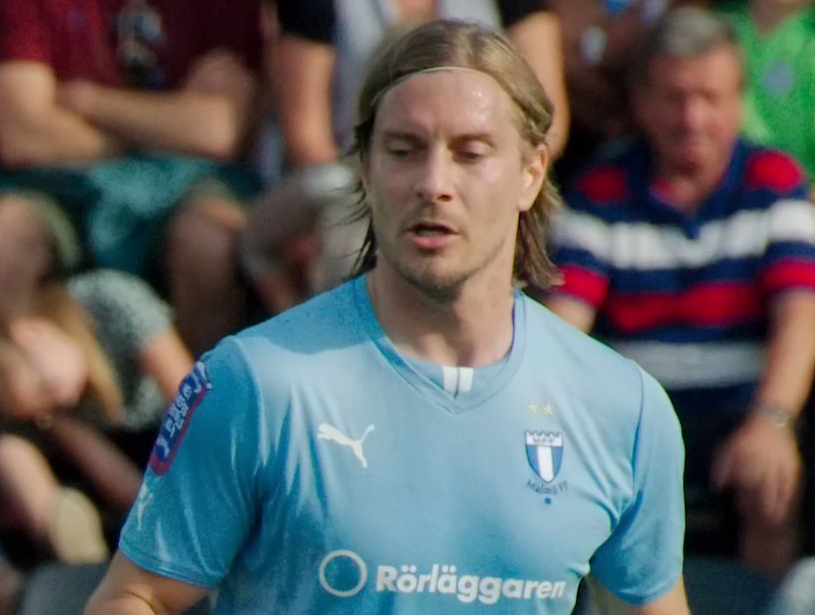
Midfielder Markus Halsti left the club after seven seasons for American side D.C. United.

==== In ====
No.	Pos.	Nat.	Name	Age	Moving from	Type	Transfer window	Ends	Transfer fee	Source
28	FW	(Sweden)	Alexander Nilsson	22	Trelleborgs FF	Loan return	Winter	2014	—	mff.se
19	FW	(Ghana)	Benjamin Fadi	19	IFK Värnamo	Loan return	Winter	2016	—	mff.se
—	FW	(Sweden)	Petter Thelin	19	Skellefteå FF	Loan return	Winter	2015	—	mff.se
29	DF	(Sweden)	Tobias Malm	22	Östersunds FK	Loan return	Winter	2014	—	mff.se
17	MF	(Sweden)	Petar Petrović	19	Radnički Niš (Serbia)	Loan return	Winter	2017	—	fotbolltransfers.com
14	MF	(Sweden)	Erik Andersson	17	Landskrona BoIS	Transfer	Winter	2018	(~ 1.5M SEK)	mff.se
6	MF	(Sweden)	Oscar Lewicki	22	BK Häcken	Bosman	Winter	2017	Free	mff.se
31	DF	(Sweden)	Franz Brorsson	18	Youth system	Promoted	Winter	2016	—	mff.se
30	GK	(Sweden)	Marko Johansson	16	Youth system	Promoted	Winter	2016	—	mff.se
22	MF	(Sweden)	Tobias Sana	25	Ajax (Netherlands)	Transfer	Winter	2018	(~ 1.0M SEK)	mff.se
23	MF	(Norway)	Jo Inge Berget	24	Cardiff City (Wales)	Bosman	Winter	2017	Free	mff.se
19	MF	(Norway)	Magnus Wolff Eikrem	24	Cardiff City (Wales)	Bosman	Winter	2017	Free	mff.se
13	DF	(Peru)	Yoshimar Yotún	24	Sporting Cristal (Peru)	Bosman	Winter	2017	Free	mff.se
26	DF	(Norway)	Andreas Vindheim	19	Brann (Norway)	Transfer	Winter	2018	(~ 3.0M SEK)	mff.se
20	DF	(Sweden)	Rasmus Bengtsson	28	Twente (Netherlands)	Transfer	Winter	2019	(~ 1.0M SEK)	mff.se
24	DF	(Turkey)	Mahmut Özen	26	Kayseri Erciyesspor (Turkey)	Loan return	Summer	2017	—	mff.se
21	DF	(Iceland)	Kári Árnason	32	Rotherham United (England)	Transfer	Summer	2017	Undisclosed	mff.se
18	MF	(Sweden)	Petar Petrović	19	IFK Värnamo	Loan return	Summer	2017	—	mff.se
20	MF	(Montenegro)	Vladimir Rodić	21	Rad (Serbia)	Transfer	Summer	2018	Undisclosed	mff.se
25	DF	(Uruguay)	Felipe Carvalho	21	Tacuarembó (Uruguay)	Transfer	Summer	2017	(~ 3.7M SEK)	mff.se
28	FW	(Serbia)	Nikola Đurđić	29	FC Augsburg (Germany)	Loan	Summer	2015	—	mff.se
1	GK	(Sweden)	Johan Wiland	34	Copenhagen (Denmark)	Transfer	Summer	2017	Undisclosed	mff.se
29	GK	(Sweden)	Fredrik Andersson	26	Örgryte IS	Transfer	Summer	2016	Undisclosed	mff.se
32	MF	(Sweden)	Mattias Svanberg	16	Youth system	Promoted	Summer	2016	—	mff.se
16	GK	(Sweden)	Sixten Mohlin	19	Västerås SK	Loan return	Summer	2018	—	mff.se
33	FW	(Sweden)	Teddy Bergqvist	16	Youth system	Promoted	Summer	2017	—	mff.se

==== Out ====
No.	Pos.	Nat.	Name	Age	Moving to	Type	Transfer window	Transfer fee	Source
2	DF	(Sweden)	Matias Concha	34	Retirement	End of contract	Winter	—	mff.se
20	DF	(Brazil)	Ricardinho	30	Gabala (Azerbaijan)	End of contract	Winter	Free	mff.se
29	DF	(Sweden)	Tobias Malm	22	Lunds BK	End of contract	Winter	Free	fotbolltransfers.com
11	MF	(Sweden)	Simon Thern	22	Heerenveen (Netherlands)	End of contract	Winter	Free	mff.se
28	FW	(Sweden)	Alexander Nilsson	22	Qormi (Malta)	End of contract	Winter	Free	fotbolltransfers.com
7	FW	(Sweden)	Magnus Eriksson	24	Guizhou Moutai (China)	Transfer	Winter	(~ 16.0M SEK)	mff.se
33	MF	(Sweden)	Emil Forsberg	23	RB Leipzig (Germany)	Transfer	Winter	(~ 35.0M SEK)	mff.se
—	FW	(Sweden)	Petter Thelin	19	Kramfors-Alliansen	Transfer	Winter	Free	mff.se
6	MF	(Finland)	Markus Halsti	30	D.C. United (United States)	End of contract	Winter	Free	mff.se
34	DF	(Sweden)	Alexander Blomqvist	20	IFK Värnamo	Loan	Winter	—	mff.se
24	FW	(Sweden)	Isaac Kiese Thelin	22	Bordeaux (France)	Transfer	Winter	(~ 38.5M SEK)	mff.se
19	FW	(Ghana)	Benjamin Fadi	19	Mjällby AIF	Loan	Winter	—	mff.se
16	GK	(Sweden)	Sixten Mohlin	19	Västerås SK	Loan	Winter	—	mff.se
22	MF	(Sweden)	Amin Nazari	21	Fredrikstad FK (Norway)	Loan	Winter	—	mff.se
18	MF	(Sweden)	Johan Hammar	21	Fredrikstad FK (Norway)	Loan	Winter	—	mff.se
35	MF	(Sweden)	Piotr Johansson	20	Ängelholms FF	Loan	Winter	—	mff.se
17	MF	(Sweden)	Petar Petrović	19	IFK Värnamo	Loan	Winter	—	mff.se
25	GK	(Sweden)	Robin Olsen	25	PAOK (Greece)	Transfer	Summer	(~ 5.0M SEK)	mff.se
4	DF	(Sweden)	Filip Helander	22	Hellas Verona (Italy)	Transfer	Summer	(~ 9.0M SEK)	mff.se
21	DF	(Sweden)	Erik Johansson	26	Gent (Belgium)	Transfer	Summer	(~ 20.0M SEK)	mff.se
16	GK	(Sweden)	Sixten Mohlin	19	Kristianstads FF	Loan	Summer	—	mff.se

=== Disciplinary record ===
N	Pos.	Nat.	Name	Yellow card	Second yellow card	Red card	Notes
2	DF	(Sweden)	Konate	1	0	0	
3	DF	(Sweden)	Tinnerholm	3	0	0	
4	DF	(Sweden)	Helander	1	0	0	
5	MF	(Sweden)	Rakip	4	0	0	
6	MF	(Sweden)	Lewicki	8	0	0	
8	MF	(Ghana)	Adu	3	0	1	
9	FW	(Sweden)	Rosenberg	3	0	1	
10	MF	(Sweden)	Molins	1	0	0	
11	FW	(Albania)	Mehmeti	3	0	0	
13	DF	(Peru)	Yotún	6	0	1	
17	DF	(Sweden)	Bengtsson	3	1	0	
19	MF	(Norway)	Eikrem	2	0	0	
20	MF	(Montenegro)	Rodić	1	0	0	
21	DF	(Sweden)	Johansson	6	0	0	
21	DF	(Iceland)	Árnason	3	0	0	
22	MF	(Sweden)	Sana	3	0	0	
23	MF	(Norway)	Berget	3	0	0	
25	DF	(Uruguay)	Carvalho	1	0	0	
26	DF	(Norway)	Vindheim	2	0	0	
28	FW	(Serbia)	Đurđić	3	0	0	
31	DF	(Sweden)	Brorsson	2	1	0	

Source: svenskfotboll.se
Only competitive matches
(yellow card) = Number of bookings; (second yellow card) = Number of sending offs after a second yellow card; (red card) = Number of sending offs by a direct red card.
Notes: Allsvenskan only

== Club ==
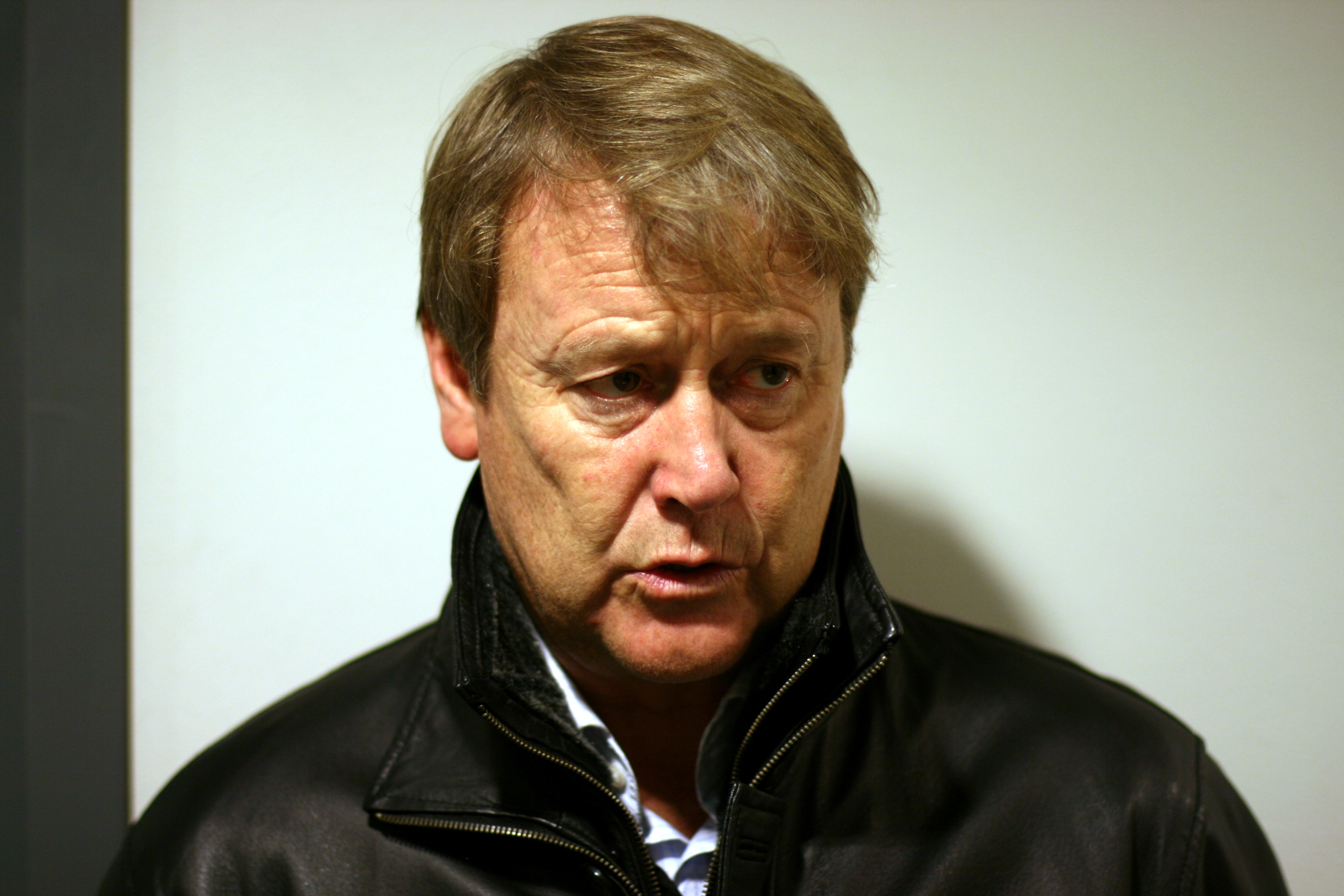
The 2015 season was Åge Hareide's second and final season with Malmö FF.

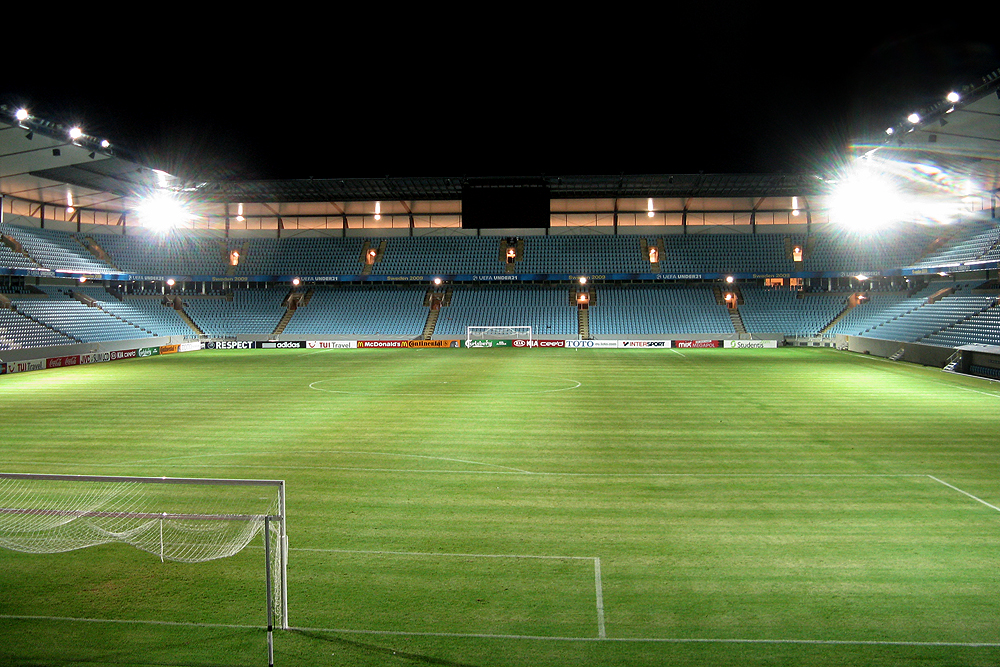
Swedbank Stadion was the third largest stadium in Allsvenskan during the 2015 season.

=== Coaching staff ===
Name	Role
(Norway) Åge Hareide	Head coach
(Sweden) Olof Persson	Assistant coach
(England) Ben Rosen	Fitness coach
(Sweden) Jonnie Fedel	Goalkeeping coach
(Sweden) Wilner Registre	Physiotherapist
(Sweden) Pär Herbertsson	Club doctor
(Sweden) Greger Andrijevski	Club masseur
(Sweden) Sverker Fryklund	Mental coach
(Sweden) Swidde Nilsson	Equipment manager
(Sweden) Yksel Osmanovski	U21 coach
(Sweden) Mats Engqvist	Head coach youth academy
(Sweden) Staffan Tapper	Youth talent coach
(Sweden) Vito Stavljanin	Head scout

=== Other information ===
Chairman	(Sweden) Håkan Jeppsson
Managing director	(Sweden) Niclas Carlnén
Director Of Sports	(Sweden) Daniel Andersson
Ground (capacity and dimensions)	Swedbank Stadion (24,000 / 105x70 m)

Source: Malmö FF and Swedbank Stadion

== Competitions ==
=== Overall ===
Competition	Started round	Current position / round	Final position / round	First match	Last match
Allsvenskan	N/A	—	5th	6 April 2015	31 October 2015
2014–15 Svenska Cupen	Round 2	—	Quarter-finals	15 November 2014	14 March 2015
UEFA Champions League	Second qualifying round	—	Group stage	15 July 2015	8 December 2015

Source: Competitions

=== Allsvenskan ===
==== League table ====
Pos	Team	Pld	W	D	L	GF	GA	GD	Pts	Qualification or relegation
3	AIK	30	18	7	5	54	34	+20	61	Qualification for the Europa League first qualifying round
4	IF Elfsborg	30	16	7	7	59	42	+17	55	
5	Malmö FF	30	15	9	6	54	34	+20	54	
6	Djurgårdens IF	30	14	9	7	52	37	+15	51	
7	BK Häcken	30	13	6	11	45	39	+6	45	Qualification for the Europa League second qualifying round (Note: BK Häcken qualified for the Europa League second qualifying round by winning the 2015–16 Svenska Cupen.)

Source: svenskfotboll.se (in Swedish)
Rules for classification: 1) Points; 2) Goal difference; 3) Goals scored; 4) Head-to-head points; 5) Head-to-head goal difference; 6) Head-to-head away goals scored; 7) Play-off
(Note: Play-off is only played if need to decide champion, teams for relegation or UEFA competition and will be played on a neutral ground).

==== Results summary ====
Overall								Home						Away					
Pld	W	D	L	GF	GA	GD	Pts	W	D	L	GF	GA	GD	W	D	L	GF	GA	GD
30	15	9	6	54	34	+20	54	9	4	2	30	16	+14	6	5	4	24	18	+6

Source: svenskfotboll.se (in Swedish)

==== Results by round ====
Round	1	2	3	4	5	6	7	8	9	10	11	12	13	14	15	16	17	18	19	20	21	22	23	24	25	26	27	28	29	30
Ground	A	H	A	H	A	H	H	A	H	A	H	A	H	A	H	A	H	A	H	H	A	A	H	A	H	A	A	H	A	H
Result	W	D	W	W	D	W	W	D	L	L	W	W	D	L	D	D	W	D	W	W	L	W	D	W	W	D	L	W	W	L
Position	1	4	2	2	2	1	1	2	4	5	4	2	4	5	6	5	5	6	6	5	5	5	5	5	4	5	5	5	4	5

Source: see below
A = Away; H = Home; W = Win; D = Draw; L = Loss

==== Matches ====
Kickoff times are in UTC+2 unless stated otherwise.

6 April 2015 Round 1	GIF Sundsvall	1–4	Malmö FF	Sundsvall
17:30	Eklund 31' (pen.)	Report	Berget 6', 16'; Rosenberg 20'; Lewicki 37'	Stadium: Norrporten Arena; Attendance: 7,850; Referee: Michael Lerjéus (Skövde)

9 April 2015 Round 2	Malmö FF	0–0	AIK	Malmö
19:00		Report		Stadium: Swedbank Stadion; Attendance: 22,337; Referee: Stefan Johannesson (Täby)

12 April 2015 Round 3	IFK Göteborg	0–1	Malmö FF	Gothenburg
17:30		Report	Yotún 36'	Stadium: Gamla Ullevi; Attendance: 16,894; Referee: Jonas Eriksson (Sigtuna)

20 April 2015 Round 4	Malmö FF	3–1	Hammarby IF	Malmö
19:00	Rosenberg 12'; Lewicki 39'; Mehmeti 90+2'	Report	Bakircioglü 15'	Stadium: Swedbank Stadion; Attendance: 19,849; Referee: Martin Strömbergsson (Gävle)

24 April 2015 Round 5	Falkenbergs FF	3–3	Malmö FF	Falkenberg
19:00	Carlsson 21'; Rodevåg 23'; Araba 57'	Report	Berget 49'; Cibicki 51'; Adu 68'	Stadium: Falkenbergs IP; Attendance: 4,492; Referee: Mohammed Al-Hakim (Köping)

29 April 2015 Round 6	Malmö FF	3–1	Halmstads BK	Malmö
19:00	Cibicki 29'; Berget 34', 51'	Report	Karikari 36'	Stadium: Swedbank Stadion; Attendance: 16,215; Referee: Stefan Johannesson (Täby)

3 May 2015 Round 7	Malmö FF	3–1	Helsingborgs IF	Malmö
17:30	Eikrem 34', 82'; Berget 45+4'	Report	Simović 59'	Stadium: Swedbank Stadion; Attendance: 21,626; Referee: Andreas Ekberg (Lund)

11 May 2015 Round 8	IF Elfsborg	2–2	Malmö FF	Borås
19:00	Rohdén 42', 90+15'	Report	Eikrem 19', 76'	Stadium: Borås Arena; Attendance: 12,400; Referee: Michael Lerjéus (Skövde)

21 May 2015 Round 9	Malmö FF	0–3	BK Häcken	Malmö
19:00		Report	Gustafson 48'; Mohammed 56'; Binaku 89'	Stadium: Swedbank Stadion; Attendance: 14,148; Referee: Martin Hansson (Holmsjö)

24 May 2015 Round 10	Kalmar FF	2–1	Malmö FF	Kalmar
17:30	Elm 78'; Antonsson 81'	Report	Berget 11'	Stadium: Guldfågeln Arena; Attendance: 7,797; Referee: Bojan Pandžić (Gothenburg)

31 May 2015 Round 11	Malmö FF	3–0	Åtvidabergs FF	Malmö
17:30	Rosenberg 8'; Eikrem 14'; Johansson 16'	Report		Stadium: Swedbank Stadion; Attendance: 16,063; Referee: Stefan Johannesson (Täby)

3 June 2015 Round 12	Gefle IF	1–2	Malmö FF	Gävle
19:00	Bertilsson 75'	Report	Rakip 27'; Johansson 81'	Stadium: Gavlevallen; Attendance: 4,667; Referee: Johan Hamlin (Bro)

7 June 2015 Round 13	Malmö FF	1–1	Djurgårdens IF	Malmö
17:30	Eikrem 52'	Report	Mushekwi 39'	Stadium: Swedbank Stadion; Attendance: 20,648; Referee: Andreas Ekberg (Lund)

4 July 2015 Round 14	IFK Norrköping	3–1	Malmö FF	Norrköping
18:00	Wahlqvist 13'; Kujović 45+3' (pen.); Fransson 88'	Report	Kroon 9'	Stadium: Idrottsparken; Attendance: 12,379; Referee: Markus Strömbergsson (Gävle)

11 July 2015 Round 15	Malmö FF	2–2	Örebro SK	Malmö
16:00	Cibicki 13'; Mehmeti 90+5'	Report	Gustavsson 16'; Holmberg 32'	Stadium: Swedbank Stadion; Attendance: 13,073; Referee: Kristoffer Karlsson (Höganäs)

18 July 2015 Round 16	Örebro SK	1–1	Malmö FF	Örebro
16:00	Nordmark 54'	Report	Rosenberg 67'	Stadium: Behrn Arena; Attendance: 6,753; Referee: Martin Strömbergsson (Gävle)

25 July 2015 Round 17	Malmö FF	3–0	GIF Sundsvall	Malmö
16:00	Đurđić 2'; Rodić 45'; Rosenberg 80'	Report		Stadium: Swedbank Stadion; Attendance: 12,862; Referee: Martin Hansson (Holmsjö)

1 August 2015 Round 18	Åtvidabergs FF	2–2	Malmö FF	Åtvidaberg
16:00	Bergström 25'; Albornoz 30'	Report	Đurđić 47' (pen.), 53'	Stadium: Kopparvallen; Attendance: 3,568; Referee: Johan Hamlin (Bro)

9 August 2015 Round 19	Malmö FF	2–1	IFK Göteborg	Malmö
15:00	Árnason 26'; Rosenberg 43' (pen.)	Report	Salomonsson 85' (pen.)	Stadium: Swedbank Stadion; Attendance: 21,127; Referee: Jonas Eriksson (Sigtuna)

15 August 2015 Round 20	Malmö FF	2–0	Gefle IF	Malmö
16:00	Rodić 31'; Rosenberg 90+1'	Report		Stadium: Swedbank Stadion; Attendance: 15,111; Referee: Bojan Pandžić (Gothenburg)

22 August 2015 Round 21	BK Häcken	1–0	Malmö FF	Gothenburg
16:00	Ericsson 77'	Report		Stadium: Bravida Arena; Attendance: 4,172; Referee: Glenn Nyberg (Borlänge)

30 August 2015 Round 22	Helsingborgs IF	0–3	Malmö FF	Helsingborg
17:30		Report	Berget 28'; Carvalho 42'; Rosenberg 78'	Stadium: Olympia; Attendance: 12,678; Referee: Mohammed Al-Hakim (Köping)

12 September 2015 Round 23	Malmö FF	1–1	IF Elfsborg	Malmö
16:00	Adu 52'	Report	Lundqvist 22'	Stadium: Swedbank Stadion; Attendance: 18,685; Referee: Stefan Johannesson (Täby)

20 September 2015 Round 24	Djurgårdens IF	0–2	Malmö FF	Stockholm
15:00		Report	Eikrem 68'; Carvalho 83'	Stadium: Tele2 Arena; Attendance: 20,019; Referee: Markus Strömbergsson (Gävle)

23 September 2015 Round 25	Malmö FF	4–3	Falkenbergs FF	Malmö
19:00	Rosenberg 27'; Đurđić 50', 57'; Rodić 55'	Report	Donyoh 33'; Araba 65'; Vall 71'	Stadium: Swedbank Stadion; Attendance: 13,556; Referee: Martin Strömbergsson (Gävle)

26 September 2015 Round 26	Halmstads BK	0–0	Malmö FF	Halmstad
16:00		Report		Stadium: Örjans Vall; Attendance: 4,318; Referee: Michael Lerjéus (Skövde)

4 October 2015 Round 27	AIK	2–1	Malmö FF	Solna
17:30	Goitom 12'; Ishizaki 61'	Report	Rodić 45'	Stadium: Friends Arena; Attendance: 25,075; Referee: Stefan Johannesson (Täby)

17 October 2015 Round 28	Malmö FF	3–0	Kalmar FF	Malmö
16:00	Rosenberg 68', 90+4'; Berget 83'	Report		Stadium: Swedbank Stadion; Attendance: 14,153; Referee: Martin Hansson (Holmsjö)

25 October 2015 Round 29	Hammarby IF	0–1	Malmö FF	Stockholm
15:00		Report	Bengtsson 58'	Stadium: Tele2 Arena; Attendance: 30,627; Referee: Bojan Pandžić (Gothenburg)

31 October 2015 Round 30	Malmö FF	0–2	IFK Norrköping	Malmö
13:00		Report	Kujović 30'; Traustason 90+3'	Stadium: Swedbank Stadion; Attendance: 20,520; Referee: Jonas Eriksson (Sigtuna)

=== Svenska Cupen ===
==== 2014–15 ====
The tournament continued from the 2014 season.

Kickoff times are in UTC+1 unless stated otherwise.

===== Group stage =====
Pos	Team	Pld	W	D	L	GF	GA	GD	Pts	Qualification	MFF	JSIF	AFF	HFF
1	Malmö FF	3	3	0	0	12	0	+12	9	Advance to Knockout stage	—	4–0	3–0	—
2	Jönköpings Södra IF	3	2	0	1	6	5	+1	6		—	—	2–0	—
3	Assyriska FF	3	1	0	2	3	6	−3	3		—	—	—	3–1
4	Hudiksvalls FF	3	0	0	3	2	12	−10	0		0–5	1–4	—	—

Source: svenskfotboll.se (in Swedish)
Rules for classification: 1) Points; 2) Goal difference; 3) Number of goals scored; 4) Head-to-head record; 5) Highest ranked team

22 February 2015 Matchday 1	Malmö FF	3–0	Assyriska FF	Malmö
16:00	Helander 5'; Sana 45'; Eikrem 89'	Report		Stadium: Malmö IP; Attendance: 5,560; Referee: Andreas Ekberg (Lund)

28 February 2015 Matchday 2	Hudiksvalls FF	0–5	Malmö FF	Hudiksvall
14:00		Report	Eikrem 25'; Tinnerholm 30'; Rosenberg 69'; Berget 70'; Wallin 72' (o.g.)	Stadium: Glysisvallen; Attendance: 982; Referee: Glenn Nyberg (Borlänge)

7 March 2015 Matchday 3	Malmö FF	4–0	Jönköpings Södra IF	Malmö
16:00	Berget 3'; Eikrem 23'; Rosenberg 56'; Mehmeti 81'	Report		Stadium: Malmö IP; Attendance: 3,646; Referee: Mohammed Al-Hakim (Köping)

===== Knockout stage =====
14 March 2015 Quarter-finals	Malmö FF	0–1	Örebro SK	Malmö
13:00		Report	Valgarðsson 22'	Stadium: Malmö IP; Attendance: 4,300; Referee: Andreas Ekberg (Lund)

==== 2015–16 ====
The tournament continued into the 2016 season.

===== Qualification stage =====
8 November 2015 Round 2	Götene IF	0–5	Malmö FF	Götene
13:00 UTC+1		Report	Rodić 1', 10'; Berget 45', 83'; Kroon 85'	Stadium: Västerby IP; Attendance: 4,036; Referee: Joakim Östling (Gothenburg)

=== UEFA Champions League ===
==== Qualifying phase and play-off round ====
Kickoff times are in UTC+2 unless stated otherwise.

===== Second qualifying round =====
15 July 2015 First Leg	Malmö FF (Sweden)	0–0	(Lithuania) Žalgiris Vilnius	Malmö, Sweden
19:00		Report		Stadium: Swedbank Stadion; Attendance: 12,436; Referee: Eitan Shmuelevitz (Israel)

21 July 2015 Second Leg	Žalgiris Vilnius (Lithuania)	0–1 (0–1 agg.)	(Sweden) Malmö FF	Vilnius, Lithuania
21:10 UTC+3		Report	Tinnerholm 55'	Stadium: LFF Stadium; Attendance: 4,933; Referee: Benoit Bastien (France)

===== Third qualifying round =====
29 July 2015 First Leg	Red Bull Salzburg (Austria)	2–0	(Sweden) Malmö FF	Wals-Siezenheim, Austria
19:00	Ulmer 51'; Hinteregger 89' (pen.)	Report		Stadium: Red Bull Arena; Attendance: 15,027; Referee: Luca Banti (Italy)

5 August 2015 Second Leg	Malmö FF (Sweden)	3–0 (3–2 agg.)	(Austria) Red Bull Salzburg	Malmö, Sweden
20:30	Đurđić 7'; Rosenberg 14'; Rodić 42'	Report		Stadium: Swedbank Stadion; Attendance: 19,522; Referee: Michael Koukoulakis (Greece)

===== Play-off round =====
19 August 2015 First Leg	Celtic (Scotland)	3–2	(Sweden) Malmö FF	Glasgow, Scotland
20:45 UTC+1	Griffiths 3', 61'; Bitton 10'	Report	Berget 52', 90+5'	Stadium: Celtic Park; Attendance: 52,412; Referee: Felix Brych (Germany)

25 August 2015 Second Leg	Malmö FF (Sweden)	2–0 (4–3 agg.)	(Scotland) Celtic	Malmö, Sweden
20:45	Rosenberg 23'; Boyata 54' (o.g.)	Report		Stadium: Swedbank Stadion; Attendance: 20,500; Referee: Milorad Mažić (Serbia)

==== Group stage ====
Times up to 25 October 2014 (matchdays 1–3) are CEST (UTC+2), thereafter (matchdays 4–6) times are CET (UTC+1).

Pos	Team	Pld	W	D	L	GF	GA	GD	Pts	Qualification	RMA	PAR	SHK	MAL
1	(Spain) Real Madrid	6	5	1	0	19	3	+16	16	Advance to knockout phase	—	1–0	4–0	8–0
2	(France) Paris Saint-Germain	6	4	1	1	12	1	+11	13	Advance to knockout phase	0–0	—	2–0	2–0
3	(Ukraine) Shakhtar Donetsk	6	1	0	5	7	14	−7	3	Transfer to Europa League	3–4	0–3	—	4–0
4	(Sweden) Malmö FF	6	1	0	5	1	21	−20	3		0–2	0–5	1–0	—

Source: UEFA
Rules for classification: Group stage tiebreakers

15 September 2015 Matchday 1	Paris Saint-Germain (France)	2–0	(Sweden) Malmö FF	Paris, France
20:45	Di María 4'; Cavani 61'	Report		Stadium: Parc des Princes; Attendance: 46,612; Referee: Sergei Karasev (Russia)

30 September 2015 Matchday 2	Malmö FF (Sweden)	0–2	(Spain) Real Madrid	Malmö, Sweden
20:45		Report	Ronaldo 29', 90'	Stadium: Swedbank Stadion; Attendance: 20,500; Referee: Cüneyt Çakır (Turkey)

21 October 2015 Matchday 3	Malmö FF (Sweden)	1–0	(Ukraine) Shakhtar Donetsk	Malmö, Sweden
20:45	Rosenberg 17'	Report		Stadium: Swedbank Stadion; Attendance: 20,500; Referee: Tasos Sidiropoulos (Greece)

3 November 2015 Matchday 4	Shakhtar Donetsk (Ukraine)	4–0	(Sweden) Malmö FF	Lviv, Ukraine
20:45	Hladkyy 29'; Srna 48' (pen.); Eduardo 55'; Teixeira 73'	Report		Stadium: Arena Lviv; Attendance: 23,712; Referee: Ovidiu Hațegan (Romania)

25 November 2015 Matchday 5	Malmö FF (Sweden)	0–5	(France) Paris Saint-Germain	Malmö, Sweden
20:45		Report	Rabiot 3'; Di María 14', 68'; Ibrahimović 50'; Lucas 82'	Stadium: Swedbank Stadion; Attendance: 20,500; Referee: Willie Collum (Scotland)

8 December 2015 Matchday 6	Real Madrid (Spain)	8–0	(Sweden) Malmö FF	Madrid, Spain
20:45	Benzema 12', 24', 74'; Ronaldo 39', 47', 50', 59'; Kovačić 70'	Report		Stadium: Santiago Bernabéu Stadium; Attendance: 60,663; Referee: Daniele Orsato (Italy)

== Non-competitive ==
=== Pre-season ===
Kickoff times are in UTC+1 unless stated otherwise.

6 February 2015 Friendly	D.C. United (United States)	0–1	(Sweden) Malmö FF	Bradenton, Florida, United States
12:00 UTC−5		Report	Berget 44'	Stadium: IMG Academy

12 February 2015 Friendly	Tampa Bay Rowdies (United States)	0–4	(Sweden) Malmö FF	Bradenton, Florida, United States
19:00 UTC−5		Report	Eikrem 33'; Rosenberg 43'; E. Johansson 44'; Cibicki 69'	Stadium: IMG Academy

20 March 2015 Friendly	Mjällby AIF	0–5	Malmö FF	Hällevik, Sweden
15:00		Report	Eikrem 15', 32'; Kroon 55'; Cibicki 74'; Mehmeti 83'	Stadium: Strandvallen

=== Mid-season ===
Kickoff times are in UTC+2 unless stated otherwise.

26 June 2015 Friendly	FC Höllviken	1–3	Malmö FF	Höllviken, Sweden
19:00	Borg 11' (pen.)	Report	Vindheim 44'; Cibicki 51'; Kroon 70'	Stadium: Höllvikens IP

7 July 2015 Friendly	Malmö FF (Sweden)	1–0	(Czech Republic) FC Slovan Liberec	Malmö, Sweden
19:00	Rosenberg 17' (pen.)	Report		Stadium: Swedbank Stadion

=== Post-season ===
Kickoff times are in UTC+1 unless stated otherwise.

12 November 2015 Friendly	Malmö FF	0–0	Sweden U21	Malmö, Sweden
15:00		Report		Stadium: Malmö Stadion; Attendance: 2,300; Referee: Jonas Eriksson (Sigtuna)

3 December 2015 Friendly	Malmö FF (Sweden)	3–1	(Norway) Molde FK	Malmö, Sweden
13:00	Adu 44' (pen.); Kroon 79'; Rakip 84'	Report	Gulbrandsen 29'	Stadium: Swedbank Stadion; Attendance: 240; Referee: Martin Strömbergsson (Gävle)
