= 2017 Malmö FF season =

Malmö FF
2017 season
- Chairman: Håkan Jeppsson
- Head coach: Magnus Pehrsson
- Stadium: Stadion
- Allsvenskan: 1st
- 2017–18 UEFA Champions League: Second qualifying round
- Top goalscorer: League: Jo Inge Berget (10); All: Jo Inge Berget (11)
- Highest home attendance: 21,354 (27 August vs IFK Göteborg, Allsvenskan)
- Lowest home attendance: 14,482 (1 July vs AFC Eskilstuna, Allsvenskan)
- Average home league attendance: 18,254
Home colours	Away colours

The 2017 season was Malmö FF's 106th in existence, their 82nd season in Allsvenskan and their 17th consecutive season in the league. They competed in Allsvenskan where they finished first, and the 2017–18 UEFA Champions League where they were knocked out in the second qualifying round. Malmö FF also participated in one competition in which the club continued playing in for the 2018 season, the 2017–18 Svenska Cupen. The season began with the first Allsvenskan match on 1 April and the season concluded with the last league match on 5 November.

For the second time in recent years, Malmö FF won back to back league titles, claiming their 20th Swedish championship. The club had previously won back to back titles in 2013 and 2014. Magnus Pehrsson was appointed new head coach after the departure of Allan Kuhn at the end of last season. The club failed to repeat the UEFA Champions League group stage success of previous years, exiting the competition at the first hurdle in the second qualifying round against Macedonian club FK Vardar.

== Players ==
=== Squad ===
Note: Flags indicate national team as defined under FIFA eligibility rules; some limited exceptions apply. Players may hold more than one non-FIFA nationality.

No.	Pos.	Nation	Player
3	DF	SWE	Anton Tinnerholm
4	DF	SWE	Behrang Safari (vice captain)
5	MF	SWE	Erdal Rakip
6	MF	SWE	Oscar Lewicki
7	MF	DEN	Anders Christiansen
8	FW	SWE	Carlos Strandberg
9	FW	SWE	Markus Rosenberg (captain)
10	MF	NOR	Magnus Wolff Eikrem
11	FW	SWE	Alexander Jeremejeff
13	DF	PER	Yoshimar Yotún
15	MF	SWE	Paweł Cibicki
17	DF	SWE	Rasmus Bengtsson
20	MF	NGR	Bonke Innocent

No.	Pos.	Nation	Player
21	MF	GHA	Kingsley Sarfo
23	MF	NOR	Jo Inge Berget
24	DF	DEN	Lasse Nielsen
25	DF	URU	Felipe Carvalho
26	DF	NOR	Andreas Vindheim
27	GK	SWE	Johan Dahlin
29	GK	SWE	Fredrik Andersson
31	DF	SWE	Franz Brorsson
32	MF	SWE	Mattias Svanberg
33	FW	SWE	Teddy Bergqvist
34	MF	SWE	Pavle Vagić
35	MF	SWE	Samuel Adrian
37	DF	SWE	Dennis Hadžikadunić

=== Players in/out ===
==== In ====
No.	Pos.	Nat.	Name	Age	Moving from	Type	Transfer window	Ends	Transfer fee	Source
24	DF	(Denmark)	Lasse Nielsen	29	Gent (Belgium)	Transfer	Winter	2020	(€650,000)	mff.se
21	MF	(Ghana)	Kingsley Sarfo	22	IK Sirius (Sweden)	Transfer	Summer	2021	(€1,330,000)	mff.se
27	GK	(Sweden)	Johan Dahlin	30	Midtjylland (Denmark)	Transfer	Summer	2020	(€370,000)	mff.se
20	MF	(Nigeria)	Bonke Innocent	21	Lillestrøm (Norway)	Transfer	Summer	2021	(€840,000)	mff.se
8	FW	(Sweden)	Carlos Strandberg	21	Club Brugge (Belgium)	Transfer	Summer	2021	(€1,000,000)	mff.se

==== Out ====
No.	Pos.	Nat.	Name	Age	Moving to	Type	Transfer window	Transfer fee	Source
8	MF	(Ghana)	Enoch Kofi Adu	26	Akhisar Belediyespor (Turkey)	Transfer	Winter	(€600,000)	mff.se
30	GK	(Sweden)	Marko Johansson	18	Trelleborgs FF	Loan	Winter	–	mff.se
18	MF	(Sweden)	Piotr Johansson	21	Gefle IF	End of contract	Winter	Free	mff.se
21	DF	(Iceland)	Kári Árnason	34	Omonia Nicosia (Cyprus)	Transfer	Winter	Undisclosed	mff.se
14	MF	(Sweden)	Erik Andersson	19	Trelleborgs FF	Loan	Winter	–	mff.se
22	MF	(Sweden)	Tobias Sana	27	AGF (Denmark)	End of contract	Summer	Free	mff.se
33	FW	(Sweden)	Teddy Bergqvist	18	Åtvidabergs FF	Loan	Summer	–	mff.se
2	DF	(Sweden)	Pa Konate	23	SPAL (Italy)	Transfer	Summer	(€300,000)	mff.se
1	GK	(Sweden)	Johan Wiland	36	Hammarby IF	Transfer	Summer	Undisclosed	mff.se
13	MF	(Peru)	Yoshimar Yotún	27	Orlando City (United States)	Transfer	Summer	Undisclosed	mff.se
15	MF	(Sweden)	Paweł Cibicki	23	Leeds United (England)	Transfer	Summer	(€1,700,000)	mff.se

== Player statistics ==
=== Appearances and goals ===
As of 5 November 2017

Number	Position	Name	2017 Allsvenskan		2017–18 Svenska Cupen		2017–18 UEFA Champions League		Total	
Number	Position	Name	Appearances	Goals	Appearances	Goals	Appearances	Goals	Appearances	Goals
1	GK	Johan Wiland	16	0	0	0	2	0	18	0
2	DF	Pa Konate	7	0	0	0	2	0	9	0
3	DF	Anton Tinnerholm	27	5	1	0	2	0	30	5
4	DF	Behrang Safari	21	1	1	0	0	0	22	1
5	MF	Erdal Rakip	27	8	1	1	2	0	30	9
6	MF	Oscar Lewicki	29	2	1	0	2	0	32	2
7	MF	Anders Christiansen	27	5	1	0	2	0	30	5
8	FW	Carlos Strandberg	9	2	1	0	0	0	10	2
9	FW	Markus Rosenberg	24	7	0	0	1	1	25	8
10	MF	Magnus Wolff Eikrem	15	1	0	0	2	0	17	1
11	FW	Alexander Jeremejeff	20	5	1	1	0	0	21	6
13	MF	Yoshimar Yotún	15	2	0	0	2	0	17	2
15	MF	Paweł Cibicki	20	5	1	0	1	0	22	5
17	DF	Rasmus Bengtsson	9	0	0	0	1	0	10	0
20	MF	Bonke Innocent	2	0	0	0	0	0	2	0
21	MF	Kingsley Sarfo	8	2	1	0	0	0	9	2
22	MF	Tobias Sana	1	0	0	0	0	0	1	0
23	MF	Jo Inge Berget	25	10	1	1	2	0	28	11
24	DF	Lasse Nielsen	25	1	1	0	2	0	28	1
25	DF	Felipe Carvalho	4	1	0	0	0	0	4	1
26	DF	Andreas Vindheim	19	1	0	0	0	0	19	1
27	GK	Johan Dahlin	11	0	1	0	0	0	12	0
29	GK	Fredrik Andersson	3	0	0	0	0	0	3	0
31	DF	Franz Brorsson	23	0	1	1	2	1	26	2
32	MF	Mattias Svanberg	18	1	1	0	2	0	21	1
33	FW	Teddy Bergqvist	0	0	0	0	1	0	1	0
34	MF	Pavle Vagić	2	0	0	0	0	0	2	0
35	MF	Samuel Adrian	3	0	0	0	0	0	3	0
37	DF	Dennis Hadžikadunić	4	0	0	0	0	0	4	0

== Competitions ==
=== Overall ===
Competition	Started round	Current position / round	Final position / round	First match	Last match
Allsvenskan	N/A	—	Winner	1 April 2017	5 November 2017
UEFA Champions League	Second qualifying round	—	Second qualifying round	12 July 2017	18 July 2017

Source: Competitions

=== Allsvenskan ===
==== League table ====
Pos	Team	Pld	W	D	L	GF	GA	GD	Pts	Qualification or relegation
1	Malmö FF (C)	30	19	7	4	63	27	+36	64	Qualification for the Champions League first qualifying round
2	AIK	30	16	9	5	47	22	+25	57	Qualification for the Europa League first qualifying round
3	Djurgårdens IF	30	15	8	7	54	30	+24	53	Qualification for the Europa League second qualifying round (Note: Since the winners of 2017–18 Svenska Cupen (Djurgårdens IF) qualified for European competitions based on their league position, the berth awarded to the 3rd-placed team (Europa League second qualifying round) was passed down to the 4th-placed team (BK Häcken).)
4	BK Häcken	30	14	10	6	42	28	+14	52	Qualification for the Europa League first qualifying round
5	Östersunds FK	30	13	11	6	48	32	+16	50	

Source: svenskfotboll.se (in Swedish)
Rules for classification: 1) Points; 2) Goal difference; 3) Goals scored; 4) Head-to-head points; 5) Head-to-head goal difference; 6) Head-to-head away goals scored; 7) Play-off
(Note: Play-off is only played if need to decide champion, teams for relegation or UEFA competition and will be played on a neutral ground).
(C) Champions

==== Results summary ====
Overall								Home						Away					
Pld	W	D	L	GF	GA	GD	Pts	W	D	L	GF	GA	GD	W	D	L	GF	GA	GD
30	19	7	4	63	27	+36	64	10	3	2	39	15	+24	9	4	2	24	12	+12

Source: svenskfotboll.se (in Swedish)

==== Results by round ====
Round	1	2	3	4	5	6	7	8	9	10	11	12	13	14	15	16	17	18	19	20	21	22	23	24	25	26	27	28	29	30
Ground	A	H	A	H	A	H	A	H	A	H	A	A	H	A	H	H	A	A	H	A	H	A	H	A	H	H	A	H	A	H
Result	D	W	W	W	D	W	W	W	D	L	W	W	W	W	D	W	W	W	W	L	D	L	W	D	W	W	W	D	W	L
Position	7	1	1	1	1	1	1	1	1	1	1	1	1	1	1	1	1	1	1	1	1	1	1	1	1	1	1	1	1	1

Source: see below
A = Away; H = Home; W = Win; D = Draw; L = Loss

==== Matches ====
1 April 2017 1	IFK Göteborg	1–1	Malmö FF	Gothenburg
13:00	Boman 8'	Report	Cibicki 34'	Stadium: Ullevi; Attendance: 32,129; Referee: Stefan Johannesson

11 April 2017 2	Malmö FF	2–0	GIF Sundsvall	Malmö
18:30	Safari 35'; Rosenberg 60'	Report		Stadium: Stadion; Attendance: 18,378; Referee: Patrik Eriksson

16 April 2017 3	Halmstads BK	0–3	Malmö FF	Halmstad
15:00		Report	Christiansen 35'; Cibicki 38', 63'	Stadium: Örjans Vall; Attendance: 8,297; Referee: Glenn Nyberg

24 April 2017 4	Malmö FF	3–2	Djurgårdens IF	Malmö
19:00	Tinnerholm 31'; Berget 75'; Yotún 86'	Report	Eriksson 45+2' (pen.); Engvall 65'	Stadium: Stadion; Attendance: 19,074; Referee: Jonas Eriksson

27 April 2017 5	Kalmar FF	0–0	Malmö FF	Kalmar
19:00		Report		Stadium: Guldfågeln Arena; Attendance: 5,887; Referee: Bojan Pandžić

1 May 2017 6	Malmö FF	2–1	Örebro SK	Malmö
15:00	Rosenberg 63' (pen.); Jeremejeff 83'	Report	Igboananike 48'	Stadium: Stadion; Attendance: 17,846; Referee: Glenn Nyberg

8 May 2017 7	IF Elfsborg	1–2	Malmö FF	Borås
19:00	Prodell 83'	Report	Cibicki 79'; Berget 90+1'	Stadium: Borås Arena; Attendance: 8,452; Referee: Stefan Johannesson

14 May 2017 8	Malmö FF	2–1	Östersunds FK	Malmö
17:30	Rosenberg 52'; Rakip 90+5'	Report	Sema 80'	Stadium: Stadion; Attendance: 19,887; Referee: Magnus Lindgren

17 May 2017 9	Hammarby IF	1–1	Malmö FF	Stockholm
19:00	Smárason 51'	Report	Tinnerholm 68'	Stadium: Tele2 Arena; Attendance: 22,456; Referee: Johan Hamlin

21 May 2017 10	Malmö FF	1–2	IFK Norrköping	Malmö
17:30	Rosenberg 76'	Report	Sjölund 83'; Holmberg 85'	Stadium: Stadion; Attendance: 20,145; Referee: Bojan Pandžić

29 May 2017 11	AIK	0–1	Malmö FF	Solna
19:00		Report	Carvalho 90+3'	Stadium: Friends Arena; Attendance: 19,570; Referee: Glenn Nyberg

3 June 2017 12	Jönköpings Södra IF	1–2	Malmö FF	Jönköping
18:00	Kozica 52'	Report	Christiansen 19'; Rakip 62'	Stadium: Stadsparksvallen; Attendance: 5,565; Referee: Patrik Eriksson

1 July 2017 13	Malmö FF	3–2	AFC Eskilstuna	Malmö
16:00	Svanberg 18'; Yotún 53'; Lewicki 66'	Report	Eddahri 31'; Ali 45+3'	Stadium: Stadion; Attendance: 14,482; Referee: Bojan Pandžić

8 July 2017 14	BK Häcken	0–1	Malmö FF	Gothenburg
18:00		Report	Jeremejeff 19'	Stadium: Bravida Arena; Attendance: 4,504; Referee: Johan Hamlin

15 July 2017 15	Malmö FF	3–3	IK Sirius	Malmö
16:00	Berget 6', 40'; Sarfo 69'	Report	Arvidsson 66'; Vecchia 82'; Haglund 90'	Stadium: Stadion; Attendance: 15,501; Referee: Stefan Johannesson

22 July 2017 16	Malmö FF	2–0	Jönköpings Södra IF	Malmö
16:00	Christiansen 67'; Eikrem 73'	Report		Stadium: Stadion; Attendance: 15,049; Referee: Mohammed Al-Hakim

29 July 2017 17	GIF Sundsvall	0–1	Malmö FF	Sundsvall
18:00		Report	Rakip 78'	Stadium: Norrporten Arena; Attendance: 4,193; Referee: Glenn Nyberg

7 August 2017 18	Djurgårdens IF	0–1	Malmö FF	Stockholm
19:00		Report	90+4' (o.g.)	Stadium: Tele2 Arena; Attendance: 22,208; Referee: Mohammed Al-Hakim

11 August 2017 19	Malmö FF	6–0	Kalmar FF	Malmö
19:00	Berget 23' (pen.); Jeremejeff 24'; Cibicki 55' (pen.); Rakip 59'; Sarfo 76'; Christiansen 81'	Report		Stadium: Stadion; Attendance: 20,202; Referee: Andreas Ekberg

19 August 2017 20	AFC Eskilstuna	3–1	Malmö FF	Eskilstuna
16:00	Buya Turay 5', 28'; Eddahri 15'	Report	Berget 59' (pen.)	Stadium: Tunavallen; Attendance: 3,115; Referee: Stefan Johannesson

27 August 2017 21	Malmö FF	2–2	IFK Göteborg	Malmö
17:30	Berget 65'; Rosenberg 82'	Report	Hysén 3'; Eriksson 85'	Stadium: Stadion; Attendance: 21,354; Referee: Andreas Ekberg

10 September 2017 22	Örebro SK	2–1	Malmö FF	Örebro
15:00	Gerzić 61'; Besara 90+2'	Report	Vindheim 49'	Stadium: Behrn Arena; Attendance: 7,224; Referee: Mohammed Al-Hakim

17 September 2017 23	Malmö FF	4–0	Hammarby IF	Malmö
17:30	Rakip 21', 62'; Berget 49'; Jeremejeff 90+4'	Report		Stadium: Stadion; Attendance: 18,830; Referee: Johan Hamlin

20 September 2017 24	Östersunds FK	2–2	Malmö FF	Östersund
19:00	Nouri 49' (pen.); Sema 90'	Report	Rakip 25'; Lewicki 66'	Stadium: Jämtkraft Arena; Attendance: 6,157; Referee: Stefan Johannesson

25 September 2017 25	Malmö FF	6–0	IF Elfsborg	Malmö
19:00	9' (o.g.); 40' (o.g.); Rosenberg 53' (pen.); Rakip 62'; Tinnerholm 72', 76'	Report		Stadium: Stadion; Attendance: 16,212; Referee: Andreas Ekberg

1 October 2017 26	Malmö FF	2–0	Halmstads BK	Malmö
15:00	55' (o.g.); Rosenberg 84'	Report		Stadium: Stadion; Attendance: 18,189; Referee: Mohammed Al-Hakim

16 October 2017 27	IFK Norrköping	1–3	Malmö FF	Norrköping
19:00	Moberg Karlsson 9'	Report	Strandberg 49'; Nielsen 61'; Christiansen 84'	Stadium: Nya Parken; Attendance: 13,769; Referee: Glenn Nyberg

23 October 2017 28	Malmö FF	0–0	AIK	Malmö
19:00		Report		Stadium: Stadion; Attendance: 19,535; Referee: Stefan Johannesson

29 October 2017 29	IK Sirius	0–4	Malmö FF	Uppsala
15:00		Report	Jeremejeff 9'; Strandberg 18'; Tinnerholm 63'; Berget 78'	Stadium: Studenternas IP; Attendance: 4,411; Referee: Victor Wolf

5 November 2017 30	Malmö FF	1–2	BK Häcken	Malmö
15:00	Berget 84'	Report	Ojala 32'; Faltsetas 72'	Stadium: Stadion; Attendance: 19,123; Referee: Mohammed Al-Hakim

=== Svenska Cupen ===
==== 2017–18 ====
The tournament continues into the 2018 season.

===== Qualification stage =====
23 August 2017 Round 2	FC Trollhättan	1–4	Malmö FF	Trollhättan
18:30	Ikenna Kean 4'	Report	Jeremejeff 22'; Brorsson 44'; Berget 88' (pen.); Rakip 90'	Stadium: Edsborgs IP; Attendance: 3,200; Referee: Granit Maqedonci

=== UEFA Champions League ===
==== Second qualifying round ====
12 July 2017 First Leg	Malmö FF	1–1	FK Vardar	Malmö
19:00 UTC+2	Brorsson 75'	Report	Nikolov 63'	Stadium: Stadion; Attendance: 20,058; Referee: Thorvaldur Árnason

18 July 2017 Second Leg	FK Vardar	3–1 (4–2 agg.)	Malmö FF	Strumica
18:00 UTC+2	Grncharov 55'; Barseghyan 61'; Nikolov 90+1'	Report	Rosenberg 16' (pen.)	Stadium: Stadion Mladost; Attendance: 2,800; Referee: Anatoliy Zhabchenko

== Non-competitive ==
=== Pre-season ===
Kickoff times are in UTC+1 unless stated otherwise.

28 January 2017	Malmö FF	0–1	FC Helsingør	Malmö
16:00		Report	Olsen 79'	Stadium: Malmö IP; Attendance: 3,084

4 February 2017	Malmö FF	0–2	Östersunds FK	Salou
10:30		Report	Bertilsson 73'; Bergqvist 87'	Stadium: Complex Esportiu Futbol Salou

8 February 2017	Malmö FF	3–1	IK Sirius	Salou
13:00	Berget 5'; Eikrem 63'; Vindheim 77'	Report	Nilsson 36'	Stadium: Complex Esportiu Futbol Salou

25 February 2017	Malmö FF	2–1	SK Brann	Malmö
15:00	Cibicki 35'; Berget 50'	Report	Børven 56'	Stadium: Malmö IP; Attendance: 1,750

5 March 2017	Malmö FF	1–1	Rosenborg BK	Malmö
15:00	Eikrem 37'	Report	Jevtović 56'	Stadium: Stadion; Attendance: 1,457

11 March 2017	Malmö FF	1–0	Jönköpings Södra IF	Malmö
15:00	Sana 85'	Report		Stadium: Malmö IP; Attendance: 1,733

18 March 2017	Malmö FF	1–1	Molde FK	Marbella
16:00	Safari 6'	Report	Hestad 90+4'	Stadium: Estadio Jose Burgos De Quintana

23 March 2017	Malmö FF	0–1	AFC Eskilstuna	Malmö
16:00		Report	Buya Turay 45'	Stadium: Stadion; Attendance: 728

=== Mid-season ===
27 June 2017	Malmö FF	1–1	NK Lokomotiva	Malmö
19:00 UTC+2	Cibicki 40'	Report	Kolar 55'	Stadium: Stadion; Attendance: 2,048
