= 2016 Malmö FF season =

Malmö FF
2016 season
- Chairman: Håkan Jeppsson
- Head coach: Allan Kuhn
- Stadium: Stadion
- Allsvenskan: 1st
- 2015–16 Svenska Cupen: Runners-up
- 2016–17 Svenska Cupen: Round 2
- Top goalscorer: League: Vidar Örn Kjartansson (14); All: Vidar Örn Kjartansson (17)
- Highest home attendance: 22,302 vs. BK Häcken (5 May 2016, Svenska Cupen)
- Lowest home attendance: 3,625 vs. IK Sirius (20 February 2016, Svenska Cupen)
- Average home league attendance: 17,841 (in Allsvenskan); 15,898 (in all competitions)
| Home colours | Away colours |

The 2016 season was Malmö FF's 105th in existence, their 81st season in Allsvenskan and their 16th consecutive season in the league. They competed in Allsvenskan where they finished first, the 2015–16 Svenska Cupen where they finished as runners-up, and the 2016–17 Svenska Cupen where they were knocked out in round two. The season began with the group stage of Svenska Cupen on 20 February, league play started on 2 April and the season concluded with the last league match on 6 November.

The club appointed Allan Kuhn as new head coach on 8 January after Åge Hareide left to coach the Denmark national football team. Despite winning the league title in his first season, Kuhn was sacked by the club on 19 November. For the first time since the 2012 season, Malmö FF only competed in domestic competitions after failing to qualify for Europe in the previous season. On the domestic stage, Malmö FF won their 19th Swedish championship after winning the league title again after a one-year wait. The club also reached their first Svenska Cupen final since 1996 but ultimately finished as runners-up after losing on penalties to BK Häcken, having been 2–0 up at half-time. For the first time since the cup changed format, Malmö FF failed to qualify for next season's group-stage after losing to tier three club Landskrona BoIS in the second round of qualifications.

== Players ==
=== Squad ===
Note: Flags indicate national team as defined under FIFA eligibility rules; some limited exceptions apply. Players may hold more than one non-FIFA nationality.

| No. | Pos. | Nation | Player |
|---|---|---|---|
| 1 | GK | SWE | Johan Wiland |
| 2 | DF | SWE | Pa Konate |
| 3 | DF | SWE | Anton Tinnerholm |
| 4 | DF | SWE | Behrang Safari |
| 5 | MF | SWE | Erdal Rakip |
| 6 | MF | SWE | Oscar Lewicki |
| 7 | MF | DEN | Anders Christiansen |
| 8 | MF | GHA | Enoch Kofi Adu |
| 9 | FW | SWE | Markus Rosenberg (captain) |
| 10 | MF | NOR | Magnus Wolff Eikrem |
| 11 | FW | SWE | Alexander Jeremejeff |
| 13 | DF | PER | Yoshimar Yotún |

| No. | Pos. | Nation | Player |
|---|---|---|---|
| 14 | MF | SWE | Erik Andersson |
| 17 | DF | SWE | Rasmus Bengtsson |
| 21 | DF | ISL | Kári Árnason (vice captain) |
| 22 | MF | SWE | Tobias Sana |
| 23 | MF | NOR | Jo Inge Berget |
| 24 | FW | ISL | Vidar Örn Kjartansson |
| 26 | DF | NOR | Andreas Vindheim |
| 29 | GK | SWE | Fredrik Andersson |
| 30 | GK | SWE | Marko Johansson |
| 31 | DF | SWE | Franz Brorsson |
| 32 | MF | SWE | Mattias Svanberg |

=== Players in/out ===
==== In ====
| No. | Pos. | Nat. | Name | Age | Moving from | Type | Transfer window | Ends | Transfer fee | Source |
|---|---|---|---|---|---|---|---|---|---|---|
| 24 | FW | (Iceland) | Vidar Örn Kjartansson | 25 | Jiangsu Suning (China) | Transfer | Winter | 2018 | (~ 3.6M SEK) | mff.se |
| 7 | MF | (Denmark) | Anders Christiansen | 25 | Chievo (Italy) | Transfer | Winter | 2018 | Undisclosed | mff.se |
| 4 | DF | (Sweden) | Behrang Safari | 31 | Basel (Switzerland) | End of contract | Summer | 2020 | Free | mff.se |
| 11 | FW | (Sweden) | Alexander Jeremejeff | 22 | BK Häcken | Transfer | Summer | 2019 | Undisclosed | mff.se |

==== Out ====
| No. | Pos. | Nat. | Name | Age | Moving to | Type | Transfer window | Transfer fee | Source |
|---|---|---|---|---|---|---|---|---|---|
| 22 | FW | (Sweden) | Pawel Cibicki | 21 | Jönköpings Södra IF | Loan | Winter | — | mff.se |
| 5 | DF | (Sweden) | Johan Hammar | 21 | Örgryte IS | Transfer | Winter | Undisclosed | mff.se |
| 8 | FW | (Ghana) | Benjamin Fadi | 20 | Karlskrona | End of contract | Winter | Free | sydsvenskan.se |
| 11 | FW | (Albania) | Agon Mehmeti | 26 | Stabæk (Norway) | Transfer | Winter | Undisclosed | mff.se |
| 18 | MF | (Sweden) | Piotr Johansson | 21 | Östersunds FK | Loan | Summer | — | mff.se |
| 10 | FW | (Sweden) | Guillermo Molins | 27 | Beijing Renhe (China) | End of contract | Summer | Free | mff.se |
| 20 | MF | (Montenegro) | Vladimir Rodic | 22 | Kardemir Karabükspor (Turkey) | Transfer | Summer | Undisclosed | mff.se |
| 25 | DF | (Uruguay) | Felipe Carvalho | 22 | Falkenbergs FF | Loan | Summer | — | mff.se |
| 24 | FW | (Iceland) | Vidar Örn Kjartansson | 26 | Maccabi Tel Aviv (Israel) | Transfer | Summer | (~ 41.0M SEK) | mff.se |

== Competitions ==
=== Overall ===
| Competition | Started round | Current position / round | Final position / round | First match | Last match |
|---|---|---|---|---|---|
| Allsvenskan | N/A | — | Winner | 2 April 2016 | 6 November 2016 |
| 2015–16 Svenska Cupen | Round 2 | — | Runners-up | 8 November 2015 | 5 May 2016 |
| 2016–17 Svenska Cupen | Round 2 | — | Round Two | 25 August 2016 | 25 August 2016 |

Source: Competitions

=== Allsvenskan ===
==== League table ====
| Pos | Team | Pld | W | D | L | GF | GA | GD | Pts | Qualification or relegation |
|---|---|---|---|---|---|---|---|---|---|---|
| 1 | Malmö FF (C) | 30 | 21 | 3 | 6 | 60 | 26 | +34 | 66 | Qualification for the Champions League second qualifying round |
| 2 | AIK | 30 | 17 | 9 | 4 | 52 | 26 | +26 | 60 | Qualification for the Europa League first qualifying round |
| 3 | IFK Norrköping | 30 | 18 | 6 | 6 | 59 | 37 | +22 | 60 | Qualification for the Europa League first qualifying round |
| 4 | IFK Göteborg | 30 | 14 | 8 | 8 | 56 | 47 | +9 | 50 | |
| 5 | IF Elfsborg | 30 | 13 | 9 | 8 | 58 | 38 | +20 | 48 | |

Source: svenskfotboll.se (in Swedish)
Rules for classification: 1) Points; 2) Goal difference; 3) Goals scored; 4) Head-to-head points; 5) Head-to-head goal difference; 6) Head-to-head away goals scored; 7) Play-off
(Note: Play-off is only played if need to decide champion, teams for relegation or UEFA competition and will be played on a neutral ground).
(C) Champions

==== Results summary ====
| Overall | | | | | | | | Home | | | | | | Away | | | | | |
| Pld | W | D | L | GF | GA | GD | Pts | W | D | L | GF | GA | GD | W | D | L | GF | GA | GD |
|---|---|---|---|---|---|---|---|---|---|---|---|---|---|---|---|---|---|---|---|
| 30 | 21 | 3 | 6 | 60 | 26 | +34 | 66 | 12 | 1 | 2 | 30 | 9 | +21 | 9 | 2 | 4 | 30 | 17 | +13 |

Source: svenskfotboll.se (in Swedish)

==== Results by round ====
| Round | 1 | 2 | 3 | 4 | 5 | 6 | 7 | 8 | 9 | 10 | 11 | 12 | 13 | 14 | 15 | 16 | 17 | 18 | 19 | 20 | 21 | 22 | 23 | 24 | 25 | 26 | 27 | 28 | 29 | 30 |
|---|---|---|---|---|---|---|---|---|---|---|---|---|---|---|---|---|---|---|---|---|---|---|---|---|---|---|---|---|---|---|
| Ground | H | A | H | A | H | A | H | A | H | A | H | A | H | A | H | A | H | A | H | A | H | A | H | H | A | A | H | A | A | H |
| Result | W | L | L | W | W | W | W | L | W | W | W | W | W | D | D | W | W | D | W | W | W | L | W | W | W | W | L | W | L | W |
| Position | 1 | 7 | 12 | 8 | 5 | 2 | 2 | 2 | 2 | 2 | 1 | 1 | 1 | 1 | 1 | 1 | 1 | 1 | 1 | 1 | 1 | 2 | 2 | 1 | 1 | 1 | 1 | 1 | 1 | 1 |

Source: see below
A = Away; H = Home; W = Win; D = Draw; L = Loss

==== Matches ====
| 2 April 2016 1 | Malmö FF | 3–1 | IFK Norrköping | Malmö |
| 13:00 | Christiansen 44'; Berget 76' (pen.); Rakip 90+2' | Report | Nyman 16' | Stadium: Stadion; Attendance: 21,085; Referee: Stefan Johannesson |

| 6 April 2016 2 | Jönköpings Södra IF | 3–2 | Malmö FF | Jönköping |
| 18:30 | Smylie 47'; Cibicki 26', 63' | Report | Bengtsson 4'; Berget 78' | Stadium: Stadsparksvallen; Attendance: 6,321; Referee: Andreas Ekberg |

| 11 April 2016 3 | Malmö FF | 1–2 | GIF Sundsvall | Malmö |
| 19:00 | Molins 40' | Report | Sonko Sundberg 12'; Hasani 86' | Stadium: Stadion; Attendance: 13,747; Referee: Johan Hamlin |

| 18 April 2016 4 | IF Elfsborg | 0–1 | Malmö FF | Borås |
| 19:00 | | Report | Rosenberg 78' | Stadium: Borås Arena; Attendance: 8,512; Referee: Martin Strömbergsson |

| 24 April 2016 5 | Malmö FF | 1–0 | Djurgårdens IF | Malmö |
| 15:00 | Carvalho 62' | Report | | Stadium: Stadion; Attendance: 18,734; Referee: Mohammed Al-Hakim |

| 27 April 2016 6 | IFK Göteborg | 0–3 | Malmö FF | Gothenburg |
| 18:30 | | Report | awarded win due to Tobias Sana was hit by a banger. | Stadium: Gamla Ullevi; Attendance: 15,748; Referee: Jonas Eriksson |

| 1 May 2016 7 | Malmö FF | 3–0 | BK Häcken | Malmö |
| 17:30 | Kjartansson 34', 38', 66' | | | Stadium: Stadion; Attendance: 15,479; Referee: Kristoffer Karlsson |

| 8 May 2016 8 | Helsingborgs IF | 2–1 | Malmö FF | Helsingborg |
| 15:00 | Larsson 4'; Rusike 81' | Report | Eikrem 90 + 4' | Stadium: Olympia; Attendance: 11,065; Referee: Martin Strömbergsson |

| 14 May 2016 9 | Malmö FF | 3–0 | Gefle IF | Malmö |
| 16:00 | Molins 49', 58'; Rodić 76' | Report | | Stadium: Stadion; Attendance: 13,801; Referee: Magnus Lindgren |

| 18 May 2016 10 | Hammarby IF | 2–3 | Malmö FF | Stockholm |
| 18:30 | Rômulo 3'; Israelsson 75' | Report | Kjartansson 10'; Christiansen 43'; Eikrem 73' | Stadium: Tele2 Arena; Attendance: 23,617; Referee: Mohammed Al-Hakim |

| 23 May 2016 11 | Malmö FF | 2–0 | Falkenbergs FF | Malmö |
| 19:00 | Rosenberg 7'; Kjartansson 12' | Report | | Stadium: Stadion; Attendance: 15,876; Referee: Martin Strömbergsson |

| 28 May 2016 12 | Östersunds FK | 1–4 | Malmö FF | Östersund |
| 16:00 | Dyer 63' | Report | Rosenberg 3'; Kjartansson 6', 65', 90 + 4' | Stadium: Jämtkraft Arena; Attendance: 7,739; Referee: Johan Krantz |

| 11 July 2016 13 | Malmö FF | 1–0 | Örebro SK | Malmö |
| 19:00 | Berget 52' | Report | | Stadium: Stadion; Attendance: 17,526; Referee: Bojan Pandzic |

| 17 July 2016 14 | AIK | 1–1 | Malmö FF | Solna |
| 17:30 | Avdić 48' | Report | Kjartansson 15' | Stadium: Friends Arena; Attendance: 15,847; Referee: Martin Strömbergsson |

| 23 July 2016 15 | Malmö FF | 1–1 | Kalmar FF | Malmö |
| 16:00 | Kjartansson 90' | Report | V. Elm 44' | Stadium: Stadion; Attendance: 14,887; Referee: Kristoffer Karlsson |

| 1 August 2016 16 | Örebro SK | 0–3 | Malmö FF | Örebro |
| 19:00 | | Report | Kjartansson 28', 53'; Rosenberg 56' | Stadium: Behrn Arena; Attendance: 9,047; Referee: Markus Strömbergsson |

| 7 August 2016 17 | Malmö FF | 2–0 | AIK | Malmö |
| 13:00 | Eikrem 43'; Christiansen 90 + 3' | Report | | Stadium: Stadion; Attendance: 20,150; Referee: Markus Strömbergsson |

| 14 August 2016 18 | Kalmar FF | 1–1 | Malmö FF | Kalmar |
| 15:00 | Ring 73' | Report | Christiansen 80' | Stadium: Guldfågeln Arena; Attendance: 7,212; Referee: Bojan Pandzic |

| 22 August 2016 19 | Malmö FF | 4–1 | Jönköpings Södra IF | Malmö |
| 19:00 | Bengtsson 23'; Kjartansson 25'; Christiansen 31'; Jeremejeff 86' | Report | Cala 90 + 3' | Stadium: Stadion; Attendance: 16,533; Referee: Stefan Johannesson |

| 28 August 2016 20 | GIF Sundsvall | 0–1 | Malmö FF | Sundsvall |
| 17:30 | | Report | Kjartansson 64' | Stadium: Norrporten Arena; Attendance: 4,116; Referee: Per Melin |

| 12 September 2016 21 | Malmö FF | 3–1 | IFK Göteborg | Malmö |
| 19:00 | Rosenberg 15', 79'; Jeremejeff 77' | Report | Jeremejeff 67' (o.g.) | Stadium: Stadion; Attendance: 21,273; Referee: Stefan Johannesson |

| 18 September 2016 22 | Djurgårdens IF | 3–1 | Malmö FF | Stockholm |
| 17:30 | Eriksson 7'; Olunga 16', 60' | Report | Eikrem 20' | Stadium: Tele2 Arena; Attendance: 15,370; Referee: Mohammed Al-Hakim |

| 22 September 2016 23 | Malmö FF | 1–0 | IF Elfsborg | Malmö |
| 19:00 | Rakip 90 + 1' | Report | | Stadium: Stadion; Attendance: 16,597; Referee: Glenn Nyberg |

| 25 September 2016 24 | Malmö FF | 2–0 | Helsingborgs IF | Malmö |
| 17:30 | Christiansen 22'; Svanberg 90 + 5' | Report | | Stadium: Stadion; Attendance: 19,918; Referee: Martin Strömbergsson |

| 1 October 2016 25 | BK Häcken | 2–4 | Malmö FF | Gothenburg |
| 16:00 | Owoeri 15'; Farnerud 19' | Report | Adu 13'; Berget 34'; Jeremejeff 61'; Sana 83' | Stadium: Bravida Arena; Attendance: 4,752; Referee: Glenn Nyberg |

| 16 October 2016 26 | IFK Norrköping | 1–2 | Malmö FF | Norrköping |
| 15:00 | Bärkroth 48' | Report | Árnason 29'; Jeremejeff 69' | Stadium: Nya Parken; Attendance: 15,940; Referee: Stefan Johannesson |

| 22 October 2016 27 | Malmö FF | 0–3 | Östersunds FK | Malmö |
| 16:00 | | Report | Ghoddos 37', 87'; Bachirou 51' | Stadium: Stadion; Attendance: 20,297; Referee: Markus Strömbergsson |

| 26 October 2016 28 | Falkenbergs FF | 0–3 | Malmö FF | Falkenberg |
| 19:00 | | Report | Berget 2'; Svanberg 20'; Jeremejeff 53' | Stadium: Falkenbergs IP; Attendance: 5,120; Referee: Martin Strömbergsson |

| 30 October 2016 29 | Gefle IF | 1–0 | Malmö FF | Gävle |
| 17:30 | Williams 72' | Report | | Stadium: Gavlevallen; Attendance: 3,380; Referee: Glenn Nyberg |

| 6 November 2016 30 | Malmö FF | 3–0 | Hammarby IF | Malmö |
| 15:00 | Berget 29'; Rosenberg 86', 90' | Report | | Stadium: Stadion; Attendance: 21,719; Referee: Stefan Johannesson |

== Non-competitive ==
=== Pre-season ===
Kickoff times are in UTC+1 unless stated otherwise.

| 29 January 2016 | Malmö FF | 1–0 | Fremad Amager | Malmö |
| 18:30 | Mehmeti 62' | Report | | Stadium: Malmö IP; Attendance: 1,555 |

| 5 February 2016 | F.C. Copenhagen | 1–0 | Malmö FF | Dubai |
| 15:00 UTC+4 | Delaney 40' | Report | | Stadium: The Sevens Stadium |

| 9 February 2016 | Malmö FF | 1–1 | FC Midtjylland | Dubai |
| 20:00 UTC+4 | Rosenberg 60' | Report | 27' | Stadium: The Sevens Stadium |

| 14 February 2016 | Malmö FF | 1–0 | Brøndby IF | Malmö |
| 14:00 | Berget 83' | Report | | Stadium: Malmö IP; Attendance: 3,847 |

| 23 February 2016 | AaB | 3–0 | Malmö FF | Aalborg |
| 15:00 | Jönsson 16'; Enevoldsen 21', 57' | Report | | Stadium: Aalborg Stadium; Attendance: 4,744 |

| 25 March 2016 | Malmö FF | 4–0 | HJK Helsinki | Malmö |
| 15:00 | Christiansen 14'; Rosenberg 22', 31'; Carvalho 57' | Report | | Stadium: Stadion; Attendance: 1,033; Referee: Kristoffer Karlsson |

=== Mid-season ===
Kickoff times are in UTC+2 unless stated otherwise.

| 29 June 2016 | Malmö FF | 1–0 | Odense Boldklub | Malmö |
| 15:00 | Kjartansson 77' | Report | | Stadium: Stadion; Attendance: 1,461; Referee: Robert Daradic |

| 4 July 2016 | Malmö FF | 2–0 | AGF Aarhus | Malmö |
| 17:00 | Kjartansson 61', 64' | Report | | Stadium: Stadion; Attendance: 2,561 |

| 4 August 2016 | Malmö FF | 0–1 | VfL Wolfsburg | Malmö |
| 19:00 | | Report | Rodríguez 85' | Stadium: Stadion; Attendance: 1,526 |
