= Felipe Carvalho =

Uruguayan football defender (born 1993)

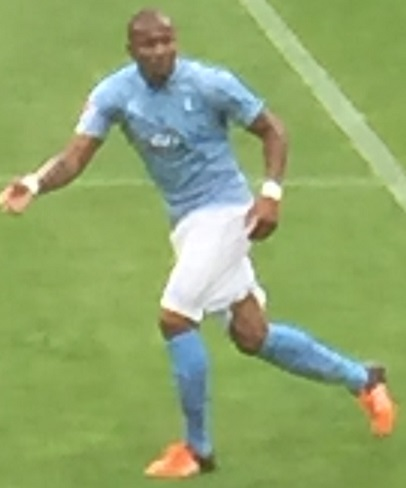

Personal information
- Full name: Luis Felipe Carvalho da Silva
- Date of birth: 18 September 1993 (age 33)
- Place of birth: Rivera, Uruguay
- Height: 1.88 m (6 ft 2 in)
- Position: Centre-back

Team information
- Current team: Tacuarembó
- Number: 3

Youth career
- 14 de Julho
- Bagé
- Ponte Preta
- –2013: Internacional

Senior career*
Years	Team	Apps	(Gls)
2014	Peñarol de Rivera		
2015	Tacuarembó	15	(0)
2015–2017	Malmö FF	17	(4)
2016	→ Falkenbergs FF (loan)	14	(0)
2018–2021	Vålerenga	22	(1)
2019	→ Nacional (loan)	28	(0)
2021	Bolívar	3	(0)
2021	River Plate	5	(0)
2022	Boston River	13	(0)
2023	Juventude	9	(0)
2024–	Tacuarembó	18	(0)
- * Club domestic league appearances and goals as of 27 July 2024

Luis Felipe Carvalho Da Silva (born 18 September 1993) is a Uruguayan football player who plays as a centre-back for Tacuarembó.

He played in several Brazilian youth teams, including Internacional. After a stint with the amateur team of Peñarol de Rivera and another one with the Tacuarembó in the Uruguayan Primera División, he was discovered by the Norwegian scout Terje Liverød who is based in Uruguay and brought Carvalho to the Swedish champions Malmö FF for whom he signed on 11 July 2015.

== Career statistics ==
As of 30 September 2018

Club	Season	League			Cup (Note: Includes the Svenska Cupen and Norwegian Football Cup)		Continental (Note: All appearances in the UEFA Champions League)		Total	
Club	Season	Division	Apps	Goals	Apps	Goals	Apps	Goals	Apps	Goals
Tacuarembó	2014–15	Uruguayan Primera División	15	0	0	0	–		15	0
Malmö FF	2015	Allsvenskan	11	2	0	0	7	0	18	2
Malmö FF	2016	Allsvenskan	2	1	0	0	–		2	1
Malmö FF	2017	Allsvenskan	4	1	0	0	0	0	4	1
Malmö FF	Total		17	4	0	0	7	0	24	4
Falkenbergs FF (loan)	2016	Allsvenskan	14	0	1	0	–		15	0
Vålerenga	2018	Eliteserien	22	1	5	2	–		27	3
Nacional	2019	Uruguayan Primera División	28	0	0	0	–		28	0
Career total			96	5	6	2	7	0	109	7

== Honours ==
Malmö FF

- Allsvenskan: 2016, 2017

Nacional

- Uruguayan Primera División: 2019
