= Anders Lewicki =

Swedish footballer

Personal information
- Full name: Anders Niclas Lewicki
- Date of birth: 7 January 1967 (age 59)
- Position: Forward

Senior career*
Years	Team	Apps	(Gls)
1984–1985	IFK Malmö		
1986–1988	Malmö FF	2	(0)
1989–1991	Husqvarna FF		
1992	Veberöds AIF		
1993–1995	Ystads IF		
1998	Bunkeflo IF		
- * Club domestic league appearances and goals

Anders Niclas Lewicki (born 7 January 1967) is a Swedish former footballer who played as a forward. He played two Allsvenskan matches for Malmö FF in 1987.

He is the father of professional footballer Oscar Lewicki.
