= Oscar Lewicki =

Swedish footballer (born 1992)

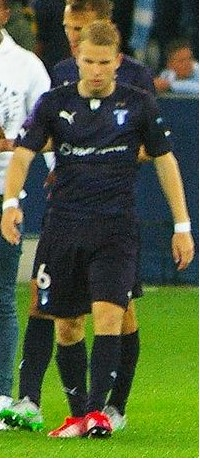
- Lewicki with Malmö FF in 2015

Personal information
- Full name: Carl Oscar Johan Lewicki
- Date of birth: 14 July 1992 (age 34)
- Place of birth: Malmö, Sweden
- Height: 1.73 m (5 ft 8 in)
- Position: Defensive midfielder

Youth career
- 1996–2005: Limhamns IF
- 2005–2008: Malmö FF
- 2008–2010: Bayern Munich

Senior career*
Years	Team	Apps	(Gls)
2010–2011	Bayern Munich II	33	(0)
2011–2014	BK Häcken	70	(2)
2015–2026	Malmö FF	213	(4)
Total		316	(6)

International career
2007–2009	Sweden U17	20	(2)
2010	Sweden U19	6	(0)
2011–2015	Sweden U21	27	(2)
2014–2018	Sweden	15	(0)
Medal record
Men's football
Representing Sweden
UEFA European Under-21 Championship
Winner	2015 Czech Republic
- * Club domestic league appearances and goals

Carl Oscar Johan Lewicki (Swedish: [lɛˈvɪ̌kːɪ], Polish: [lɛˈvitskʲi]; born 14 July 1992) is a Swedish former professional footballer who played as a defensive midfielder.

Born in Malmö, Lewicki started off his career with Malmö FF before joining Bayern Munich's youth organization in 2008. In 2011, Lewicki returned to his native Sweden to play for BK Häcken. In 2015, he rejoined his boyhood club Malmö FF with which he won the 2016, 2017, 2020, 2021, 2023, and 2024 Allsvenskan titles.

A full international between 2014 and 2018, Lewicki won 15 caps for the Sweden national team and was a squad player for his country at UEFA Euro 2016.

== Club career ==
=== Bayern Munich ===
Lewicki joined FC Bayern Munich from his native Malmö FF in 2008 and settled into their youth setup. He was first involved with Bayern's reserve team towards the end of the 2009–10 season appearing as an unused substitute in a number of matches as the season drew to a close. He made his debut at the beginning of the following season in a 4–1 defeat against Kickers Offenbach and made 33 appearances as the club got relegated from the 3. Liga. He was offered a pro-contract at the first team but declined. In June 2011 he became a free agent.

=== BK Häcken ===
Despite FC Bayern Munich trying to re-sign him, Lewicki chose to join Swedish side BK Häcken in August 2011 after having penned a contract lasting through to 2014. The main reason for the switch was due to the presumable lack of first-team football in the near future with the German team. Lewicki spent four seasons at Häcken before leaving the club at the end of his contract in 2014.

=== Malmö FF ===
Lewicki's first club Malmö FF announced that he would return to the club on a three-year contract on 13 November 2014. The transfer went through when the Swedish transfer window opened on 8 January 2015. On 18 January 2026, Lewicki announced he would retire at the end of the month. Lewicki played 362 matches, won six league titles and one cup title with his childhood club.

== International career ==
After having represented the Sweden U17 and U19 teams, Lewicki was a vital part of the Sweden U21 team that won the 2015 UEFA European Under-21 Championship and was selected to the Team of the Tournament.

He made his full international debut for Sweden on 17 January 2014 in a friendly game against Moldova. He made his competitive debut for Sweden on 9 October 2015 in a UEFA Euro 2016 qualifier against Liechtenstein, coming on as a substitute for Albin Ekdal in the 66th minute. He played in all 180 minutes as Sweden eliminated Denmark in the UEFA Euro 2016 qualifying play-offs after winning 4–3 on aggregate in two games.

Lewicki was a squad member for Sweden at UEFA Euro 2016 and played in two games before Sweden was eliminated in the group stage.

After Euro 2016, Lewicki was out of the national team for the 2018 World Cup cycle. Between 2019 and 2021 he was once again selected for the national team on several occasions, but had to withdraw with various injuries.

== Personal life ==
Lewicki is the son of Anders Lewicki, who made two Allsvenskan appearances for Malmö FF in 1987. His cousin, Tobias Lewicki, has also made one appearance for Malmö FF.

Lewicki's grandfather was from Germany, and had Polish roots.

== Career statistics ==
=== Club ===
As of 29 January 2026

Appearances and goals by club, season and competition
Club	Season	Division	League		Cup		Continental		Total	
Club	Season	Division	Apps	Goals	Apps	Goals	Apps	Goals	Apps	Goals
Bayern Munich II	2010–11	3. Liga	33	0	0	0	—		33	0
BK Häcken	2011	Allsvenskan	0	0	0	0	0	0	0	0
BK Häcken	2012	Allsvenskan	24	1	0	0	—		24	1
BK Häcken	2013	Allsvenskan	18	1	0	0	3	0	21	1
BK Häcken	2014	Allsvenskan	27	0	5	0	—		32	0
BK Häcken	Total		69	2	5	0	3	0	77	2
Malmö FF	2015	Allsvenskan	27	2	4	0	12	0	43	2
Malmö FF	2016	Allsvenskan	24	0	7	0	—		31	0
Malmö FF	2017	Allsvenskan	29	2	1	0	2	0	32	2
Malmö FF	2018	Allsvenskan	28	0	6	0	13	1	47	1
Malmö FF	2019	Allsvenskan	27	0	3	0	14	1	44	1
Malmö FF	2020	Allsvenskan	23	0	6	0	4	0	33	0
Malmö FF	2021	Allsvenskan	11	0	0	0	10	0	21	0
Malmö FF	2022	Allsvenskan	11	0	1	0	5	0	17	0
Malmö FF	2023	Allsvenskan	23	0	2	0	—		25	0
Malmö FF	2024	Allsvenskan	2	0	1	0	1 (Note: Appearance in UEFA Europa League)	0	4	0
Malmö FF	2025	Allsvenskan	8	0	1	0	6 (Note: Two appearances in UEFA Champions League, four appearances and one goal in UEFA Europa League)	1	15	1
Malmö FF	2026	Allsvenskan	0	0	0	0	1 (Note: Appearance in UEFA Europa League)	0	1	0
Malmö FF	Total		213	4	32	0	68	3	313	7
Career total			315	6	37	0	68	3	422	9

=== International ===
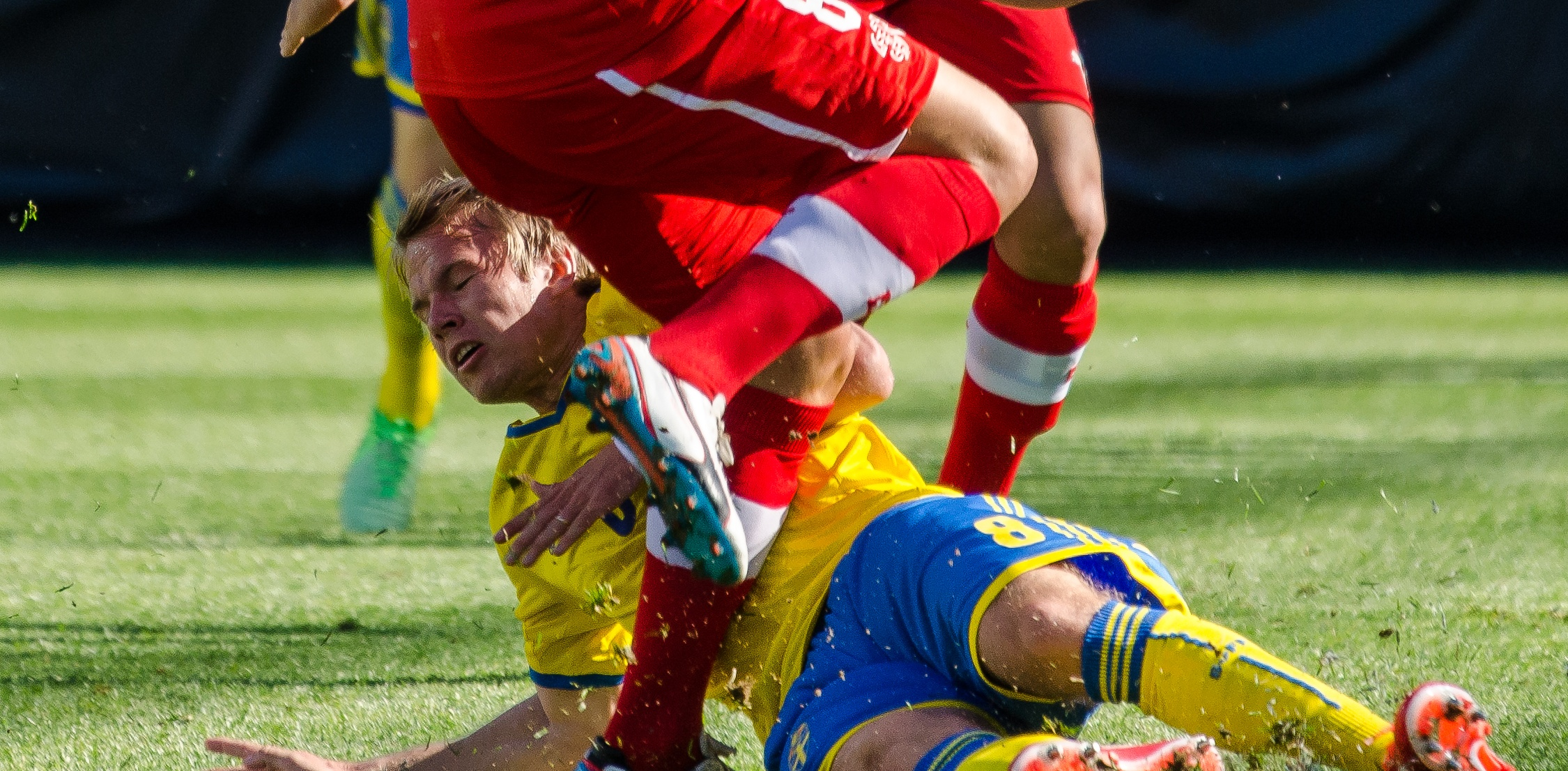
Lewicki playing for Sweden U21.

Appearances and goals by national team and year

As of 11 January 2018

Appearances and goals by national team and year
National team	Year	Apps	Goals
Sweden	2014	2	0
Sweden	2015	6	0
Sweden	2016	4	0
Sweden	2017	2	0
Sweden	2018	1	0
Total		15	0

== Honours ==
Malmö FF

- Allsvenskan: 2016, 2017, 2020, 2021, 2023, 2024
- Svenska Cupen: 2021–22

Sweden U21

- UEFA European Under-21 Championship: 2015

Individual

- UEFA European Under-21 Championship - Team of the Tournament: 2015
