= Alexander Jeremejeff =

Swedish footballer (born 1993)

- Jeremejeff with Persija in 2026

Personal information
- Full name: Alexander Thomas Jeremejeff
- Date of birth: 12 October 1993 (age 33)
- Place of birth: Kungsbacka, Sweden
- Height: 1.92 m (6 ft 4 in)
- Position: Forward

Team information
- Current team: Persija Jakarta
- Number: 9

Youth career
- –2005: Tölö IF
- 2005–2011: Örgryte IS

Senior career*
| Years | Team | Apps | (Gls) |
| 2011–2012 | Örgryte IS | 3 | (0) |
| 2013 | Qviding FIF | 21 | (14) |
| 2014–2016 | BK Häcken | 37 | (11) |
| 2016–2018 | Malmö FF | 48 | (11) |
| 2018–2019 | BK Häcken | 34 | (17) |
| 2019–2020 | Dynamo Dresden | 23 | (4) |
| 2020 | → Twente (loan) | 9 | (1) |
| 2021–2022 | BK Häcken | 54 | (33) |
| 2023–2025 | Panathinaikos | 41 | (12) |
| 2023 | → Levadiakos (loan) | 10 | (1) |
| 2026 | PAOK | 16 | (7) |
| 2026– | Persija Jakarta | 8 | (6) |

International career^{‡}
| 2019 | Sweden | 1 | (0) |
- * Club domestic league appearances and goals as of 1 November 2026 ‡ National team caps and goals as of 9 January 2019

Alexander Thomas Jeremejeff (Russian: Александр Томас Еремеев; born 12 October 1993) is a Swedish professional footballer who plays as a forward for Super League club Persija Jakarta. He has previously played for Örgryte IS, Qviding FIF, Malmö FF and BK Häcken, Dynamo Dresden, Twente, Panathinaikos, Levadiakos and PAOK before moving to Indonesia. He was the Allsvenskan top scorer and Player of the Season in 2022 as BK Häcken won the first Swedish championship in the club's history. He won one cap for the Sweden national team in 2019.

== Club career ==
=== Örgryte IS ===
Born in Kungsbacka, Jeremejeff started to play for local side Tölö IF before joining Gothenburg-club Örgryte IS in 2005. After advancing through the academy and scoring five goals in a youth game against Malmö FF, Jeremejeff was picked for the senior squad to a league game against Kristianstads FF in September 2011. He made his debut the same game, substituting with Danny Ervik in the 75' minute while losing 3–2, but manage to impact the team to later win by 4–3.

Örgryte offered Jeremejeff a senior contract after the 2011 season, which he accepted. He scored his first goal in an exhibition game against Qviding on March 28 the following year, scoring the minute after he was substituted in. However, he came to play only two league games during the 2012 season when Örgryte won Division 1, and decided to leave the club in January 2013 due to lack of playtime.

=== Qviding FIF ===
Jeremejeff signed a long-term contract with Division 1 team Qviding on 28 January 2013, as a free agent. The 2013 season was his first as a starting player, scoring 14 goals in 21 league games - almost half of the team's total of 33 goals, ending up being the second top scorer in division. His record made him attractive to professional clubs and on 26 October 2013 he was signed by the Allsvenskan club BK Häcken. Jeremejeff have afterwards expressed gratitude to Qviding manager Bosko Orovic, claiming he was the football coach that meant most for his football career.

=== BK Häcken ===
with Jeremejeff having joined BK Häcken in October 2013, Jeremejeff made his debut for BK Häcken in a 3–1 defeat at IF Elfsborg on 4 April 2014.

=== Malmö FF ===
In July 2016, Jeremejeff signed for Malmö FF on a two-and-a-half-year contract.

=== Return to BK Häcken ===
In the summer of 2018, Jeremejeff rejoined former club BK Häcken for an undisclosed fee, rumoured to be 5,000,000 SEK.

=== Dynamo Dresden ===
On 13 August 2019, Jeremejeff signed for 2. Bundesliga club Dynamo Dresden on a three-year contract running until 30 June 2022, for an undisclosed fee. On 18 August 2019, he scored on his Dresden debut; the winning goal in a 2–1 victory at home to 1. FC Heidenheim. After a further five appearances and a goal, Jeremejeff tore his calf muscle in a 4–1 defeat to local rivals Erzgebirge Aue on 29 September 2019, ruling him out until late October.

=== FC Twente and third spell at BK Häcken ===
After Dynamo Dresden's relegation from the 2. Bundesliga, Jeremejeff joined FC Twente of the Eredivisie on loan in August 2020. The agreement initially ran through the end of the 2020–21 season and included an option for Twente to purchase him. He made nine league appearances and scored once before the loan was terminated early.

In January 2021, Jeremejeff left Dynamo permanently and returned to BK Häcken for a third spell, signing a three-year contract. He scored 11 league goals in 2021 before producing the most successful season of his career in 2022. His 22 goals in 27 league matches made him the Allsvenskan top scorer as Häcken won the first Swedish championship in the club's history. He was also named both Allsvenskan Player of the Season and Forward of the Season.

=== Panathinaikos and Levadiakos ===
In January 2023, Häcken sold Jeremejeff to Greek club Panathinaikos. He was immediately loaned to Levadiakos for the remainder of the 2022–23 season, making ten league appearances and scoring once.

After returning to Panathinaikos, Jeremejeff made his competitive debut for the club on 1 October 2023 against PAOK, scoring a 96th-minute equaliser in a 2–2 draw. Over his Panathinaikos career he made 41 league appearances and scored 12 goals, and 60 appearances with 16 goals in all competitions. He was part of the squad that won the 2023–24 Greek Football Cup, defeating Aris in the final.

=== PAOK ===
On 31 December 2025, Jeremejeff left Panathinaikos and joined PAOK on a free transfer, signing a contract through 30 June 2027. He made 16 league appearances for PAOK and scored seven goals. His spell lasted until August 2026, when he moved to Indonesia.

=== Persija Jakarta ===
On 21 August 2026, Jeremejeff joined Indonesian club Persija Jakarta on a two-season contract. On his competitive debut on 5 September, he headed the only goal in a 1–0 away victory over Borneo and was named man of the match.

== International career ==
Jeremejeff made his debut for the Sweden national team on 8 January 2019 in a friendly against Finland, as a starter.

== Career statistics ==
As of match played 19 September 2026

Appearances and goals by club, season and competition
| Club | Season | League | | | National cup (Note: Includes Svenska Cupen, DFB-Pokal, KNVB Cup, Greek Football Cup) | | Continental | | Total | |
| Club | Season | Division | Apps | Goals | Apps | Goals | Apps | Goals | Apps | Goals |
|---|---|---|---|---|---|---|---|---|---|---|
| Örgryte IS | 2011 | Division 1 Södra | 1 | 0 | 0 | 0 | — | | 1 | 0 |
| Örgryte IS | 2012 | Division 1 Södra | 2 | 0 | 2 | 0 | — | | 4 | 0 |
| Örgryte IS | Total | | 3 | 0 | 2 | 0 | 0 | 0 | 5 | 0 |
| Qviding FIF | 2013 | Division 1 Södra | 21 | 14 | 0 | 0 | — | | 21 | 14 |
| BK Häcken | 2014 | Allsvenskan | 17 | 3 | 4 | 2 | — | | 21 | 5 |
| BK Häcken | 2015 | Allsvenskan | 13 | 6 | 1 | 0 | — | | 14 | 6 |
| BK Häcken | 2016 | Allsvenskan | 7 | 2 | 4 | 4 | — | | 11 | 6 |
| BK Häcken | Total | | 37 | 11 | 9 | 6 | 0 | 0 | 46 | 17 |
| Malmö FF | 2016 | Allsvenskan | 15 | 5 | 0 | 0 | — | | 15 | 5 |
| Malmö FF | 2017 | Allsvenskan | 20 | 5 | 1 | 1 | 0 | 0 | 21 | 6 |
| Malmö FF | 2018 | Allsvenskan | 13 | 1 | 6 | 2 | 2 (Note: Appearances in UEFA Champions League) | 0 | 21 | 3 |
| Malmö FF | Total | | 48 | 11 | 7 | 3 | 2 | 0 | 57 | 14 |
| BK Häcken | 2018 | Allsvenskan | 15 | 9 | 6 | 6 | — | | 21 | 15 |
| BK Häcken | 2019 | Allsvenskan | 19 | 8 | 0 | 0 | — | | 19 | 8 |
| BK Häcken | Total | | 34 | 17 | 6 | 6 | — | | 40 | 23 |
| Dynamo Dresden | 2019–20 | 2. Bundesliga | 23 | 4 | 1 | 0 | — | | 24 | 4 |
| FC Twente | 2020–21 | Eredivisie | 9 | 1 | 1 | 0 | — | | 10 | 1 |
| BK Häcken | 2021 | Allsvenskan | 27 | 11 | 5 | 5 | — | | 32 | 16 |
| BK Häcken | 2022 | Allsvenskan | 27 | 22 | 2 | 1 | 2 | 1 | 31 | 24 |
| BK Häcken | Total | | 54 | 33 | 7 | 6 | 2 | 1 | 63 | 40 |
| Levadiakos (Loan) | 2022–23 | Super League Greece | 10 | 1 | 0 | 0 | — | | 10 | 1 |
| Panathinaikos | 2023–24 | Super League Greece | 15 | 8 | 2 | 0 | — | | 17 | 8 |
| Panathinaikos | 2024–25 | Super League Greece | 22 | 3 | 2 | 0 | 10 (Note: Four appearances and three goals in UEFA Europa League, six appearances and one goal in UEFA Conference League) | 4 | 34 | 7 |
| Panathinaikos | 2025–26 | Super League Greece | 4 | 1 | 1 | 0 | 4 (Note: One appearance in UEFA Champions League, three appearances in UEFA Europa League) | 0 | 9 | 1 |
| Panathinaikos | Total | | 41 | 12 | 5 | 0 | 14 | 4 | 60 | 16 |
| PAOK | 2025–26 | Super League Greece | 13 | 7 | 2 | 1 | 2 | 1 | 17 | 9 |
| Career total | | | 282 | 106 | 39 | 22 | 18 | 5 | 353 | 139 |

== Honours ==
BK Häcken

- Allsvenskan: 2022
- Svenska Cupen: 2015–16, 2018–19

Malmö FF

- Allsvenskan: 2016, 2017

Panathinaikos

- Greek Cup: 2023–24

Individual

- Allsvenskan top scorer: 2022
- Allsvenskan Player of the Season: 2022
- Allsvenskan Forward of the Season: 2022
