= Marko Johansson =

Swedish footballer (born 1998)

Personal information
- Date of birth: 25 August 1998 (age 28)
- Place of birth: Malmö, Sweden
- Height: 1.94 m (6 ft 4 in)
- Position: Goalkeeper

Team information
- Current team: Tractor
- Number: 30

Youth career
- 2002–2015: Malmö FF

Senior career*
Years	Team	Apps	(Gls)
2015–2021	Malmö FF	25	(0)
2017–2018	→ Trelleborgs FF (loan)	59	(0)
2019	→ GAIS (loan)	29	(0)
2020	→ Mjällby AIF (loan)	8	(0)
2021–2024	Hamburger SV	27	(0)
2022–2023	→ VfL Bochum (loan)	9	(0)
2023	→ Halmstads BK (loan)	11	(0)
2024	→ Hansa Rostock (loan)	18	(0)
2024–2025	Eintracht Braunschweig	16	(0)
2025–	Tractor	1	(0)

International career^{‡}
2013–2015	Sweden U17	12	(0)
2015–2018	Sweden U19	11	(0)
2019	Sweden U21	2	(0)
- * Club domestic league appearances and goals as of 12 September 2025 ‡ National team caps and goals as of 7 September 2022

Marko Johansson (born 25 August 1998) is a Swedish professional footballer who plays as a goalkeeper for Tractor.

== Career ==
Marko Johansson made his first team debut for Malmö FF in a Champions League qualifier against FK Žalgiris on 21 July 2015. The 16 year old Johansson came on in the 50th minute as a result of a Zlatan Azinović injury and kept the clean sheet intact as MFF advanced to the next round.

Johansson was loaned to Superettan side Trelleborgs FF for the 2017 season. On 30 October 2017 it was announced that the loan had been extended over the 2018 season. Just days later Johansson helped Trelleborg win the promotion playoff against Jönköpings Södra IF to end the club's six year absence from the Swedish top tier. He made his Allsvenskan debut on 1 April 2018 in a 3–1 defeat against IFK Göteborg.

In 2020, he played 16 games when Malmö FF won their 21st Swedish Championship, conceding 18 goals.

On 30 January 2024, Johansson moved on loan to Hansa Rostock.

On 9 August 2024, Johansson signed a one-season contract with Eintracht Braunschweig.

== Personal life ==
Johansson is of maternal Serbian descent.

== Career statistics ==
As of match played 15 March 2024

Appearances and goals by club, season and competition
Club	Season	League			National cup (Note: Includes Svenska Cupen)		Continental		Other		Total	
Club	Season	Division	Apps	Goals	Apps	Goals	Apps	Goals	Apps	Goals	Apps	Goals
Malmö FF	2015	Allsvenskan	0	0	0	0	1 (Note: Appearance in UEFA Champions League)	0	—		1	0
Malmö FF	2016	Allsvenskan	0	0	1	0	—		—		1	0
Malmö FF	2020	Allsvenskan	16	0	0	0	4 (Note: Appearances in UEFA Europa League)	0	—		20	0
Malmö FF	2021	Allsvenskan	9	0	3	0	0	0	—		12	0
Malmö FF	Total		25	0	4	0	5	0	—		34	0
Trelleborgs FF (loan)	2017	Superettan	30	0	3	0	—		2 (Note: Appearances in Superettan promotion play-offs)	0	35	0
Trelleborgs FF (loan)	2018	Allsvenskan	29	0	2	0	—		—		31	0
Trelleborgs FF (loan)	Total		59	0	5	0	0	0	2	0	66	0
GAIS (loan)	2019	Superettan	29	0	3	0	—		—		32	0
Mjällby AIF (loan)	2020	Allsvenskan	8	0	2	0	—		—		10	0
Hamburger SV	2021–22	2. Bundesliga	7	0	0	0	—		0	0	7	0
Hamburger SV	2022–23	2. Bundesliga	0	0	—		—		—		0	0
Hamburger SV	Total		7	0	0	0	—		0	0	7	0
VfL Bochum (loan)	2022-23	Bundesliga	0	0	0	0	—		—		0	0
Halmstads BK (loan)	2023	Allsvenskan	11	0	0	0	—		—		11	0
Hansa Rostock (loan)	2023-24	2. Bundesliga	0	0	—		—		—		0	0
Career total			139	0	14	0	5	0	2	0	161	0

== Honours ==
Malmö FF

- Allsvenskan: 2020, 2021
