= Hakeem Araba =

English footballer

Personal information
- Full name: Hakeem Ayodeji Ayodele Craig Araba
- Date of birth: 12 February 1991 (age 35)
- Place of birth: Waltham Forest, England
- Position: Striker

Team information
- Current team: IFK Göteborg (fitness coach)

Youth career
- Peterborough United

Senior career*
Years	Team	Apps	(Gls)
2007–2008	Peterborough United	0	(0)
2007–2008	→ Boston United (loan)	1	(0)
2008–2011	Dagenham & Redbridge	0	(0)
2008	→ Thurrock (loan)	7	(0)
2008–2009	→ Redbridge (loan)	23	(17)
2010	Bishop's Stortford	7	(0)
2010	→ Billericay Town (dual registration)	4	(1)
2011–2012	Bromley	46	(15)
2012	East Thurrock United	16	(8)
2012–2013	Whitehawk	16	(3)
2013–2014	AEK Kouklia	26	(10)
2014	Ermis Aradippou	1	(0)
2014–2015	Panthrakikos	7	(0)
2015–2017	Falkenberg	51	(9)
2017	Næstved	12	(1)
2017	Örgryte IS	14	(1)
2018	PS Kemi	9	(1)
2019	Koblenz	15	(1)
2019–2020	Akritas Chlorakas	19	(3)
2020–2021	Qviding	32	(7)
Total		297	(78)
- * Club domestic league appearances and goals as of 11:54, 19 December 2024 (UTC)

Hakeem Ayodeji Ayodele Craig Araba (born 12 February 1991) is an English former professional footballer who played as a striker. He is fitness coach at IFK Göteborg.

== Career ==
Hakeem Araba (2018)

Araba started his youth career at the age of 17 with Peterborough United. He then signed his first professional contract at the age of 18 at Dagenham & Redbridge. While playing at Dagenham, he went on loan to Thurrock and Redbridge. After leaving Dagenham he played 7 games with Bishop's Stortford, before moving to Billericay Town.

In 2013, Araba then headed southwards to Cyprus and AEK Kouklia before a short stint with Ermis Aradippou in July 2014, appearing in a UEFA Europa League qualifier against Young Boys. he moved to Greek Panthrakikos. From Greece Araba moved to Sweden, he signed a contract with Falkenbergs FF where he was known as "Superman" by the fans. Araba finished the season of 2015 as the top goal scorer for his club.

In February 2017 Araba signed for Danish team, Næstved. Six months later, he moved to Örgryte in Sweden.

In January 2019, Araba joined Oberliga side Koblenz.

On 23 August 2019, Araba returned to Cyprus to join Cypriot Second Division side Akritas Chlorakas.

On 11 September 2020, Araba headed back to Sweden after more than two years to join Division 1 Södra side Qviding.

== Coaching career ==
In January 2025, Araba was named as the fitness coach of IFK Göteborg.

== Personal life ==
Araba was born in England and is of Nigerian descent.
