= Teddy Bergqvist =

Swedish footballer

Personal information
- Full name: Teddy Carl-Johan Oliver Bergqvist
- Date of birth: 16 March 1999 (age 27)
- Height: 1.80 m (5 ft 11 in)
- Position: Forward

Team information
- Current team: BHSK Malmö

Youth career
- 2003–2005: Eriksfälts FF
- 2005–2016: Malmö FF

Senior career*
Years	Team	Apps	(Gls)
2016–2018	Malmö FF	1	(0)
2017	→ Åtvidabergs FF (loan)	13	(0)
2018	→ Varbergs BoIS (loan)	20	(4)
2019	Kristianstad FC	29	(12)
2020	FC Helsingør	15	(2)
2021	Skövde AIK	9	(2)
2021–2023	Kristianstad FC	59	(22)
2023	Nosaby IF	10	(2)
2024	IFK Hässleholm	7	(0)
2024–2025	Bosnien Hercegovinas SK	17	(5)
2026–	Janstorps AIF	0	(0)

International career
2014–2016	Sweden U17	26	(12)
2016–2018	Sweden U19	17	(7)
- * Club domestic league appearances and goals as of 2 July 2023

Teddy Carl-Johan Oliver Bergqvist (born 16 March 1999) is a Swedish footballer who plays as a striker for Janstorps AIF.

== Club career ==
=== Malmö FF ===
On 14 October 2015 16-year-old Teddy Bergqvist signed a two-year apprenticeship contract with Malmö FF after spending a decade in the club's youth system. A year later, on 1 October 2016, Bergqvist made his first team debut in a 4–2 win against BK Häcken when he came on as a substitute for Jo Inge Berget in stoppage time.

On 12 July 2017, Bergqvist came on as a substitute for Paweł Cibicki in the 85th minute of Malmö FF's 1-1 first leg draw with FK Vardar in the second qualifying round of the Champions League. On 18 July, he joined Åtvidabergs FF on loan in Superettan for the rest of the 2017 season. In September, Bergqvist signed a one-year contract extension with Malmö FF to keep him at the club through the 2018 season.

On 1 February 2018, Bergqvist joined Varbergs BoIS on loan in Superettan for the 2018 season.

=== Kristianstad FC ===
On 18 January 2019, Bergqvist signed a two-year contract with Kristianstad FC. He scored his first league goal during the second match of the season, the third goal in a 2–6 defeat at Oskarshamns AIK on 13 April. During the 2019 season, Bergqvist scored 11 goals and played in all but one of the 30 league matches in Division 1 Södra. Kristianstad finished in the relegation places and after the season his contract was terminated by mutual consent.

=== FC Helsingør ===
In the winter 2020, Bergqvist went on a trial at Danish 2nd Division club FC Helsingør. He played two friendly games for the club, scoring three goals, which earned him a permanent contract which was announced and confirmed on 7 February 2020. The club confirmed on 24 November 2020, that the deal had been terminated.

=== Skövde AIK ===
Bergqvist returned to Sweden on 4 January 2021 joining Division 1 club Skövde AIK.

=== Kristianstad FC ===
On 17 July 2021, Bergqvist returned to Division 2 club Kristianstad FC.

== Career statistics ==
As of 2 November 2019

Club	Season	League			Cup		Continental		Other		Total	
Club	Season	Division	Apps	Goals	Apps	Goals	Apps	Goals	Apps	Goals	Apps	Goals
Malmö FF	2016	Allsvenskan	1	0	0	0	—		—		1	0
Malmö FF	2017	Allsvenskan	0	0	0	0	1	0	—		1	0
Malmö FF	Total		1	0	0	0	1	0	0	0	2	0
Åtvidabergs FF (loan)	2017	Superettan	13	0	0	0	—		—		13	0
Åtvidabergs FF (loan)	Total		13	0	0	0	0	0	0	0	13	0
Varbergs BoIS (loan)	2018	Superettan	20	4	3	0	—		1 (Note: Appearance in the Superettan/Division 1 play-offs)	0	24	4
Varbergs BoIS (loan)	Total		20	4	3	0	0	0	1	0	24	4
Kristianstad FC	2019	Division 1	29	11	0	0	—		0	0	29	11
Kristianstad FC	Total		29	11	0	0	0	0	0	0	29	11
Career total			63	15	3	0	1	0	1	0	68	15

== Honours ==
Malmö FF

- Allsvenskan: 2016
