= Stefan Johannesson =

Swedish football referee (born 1971)

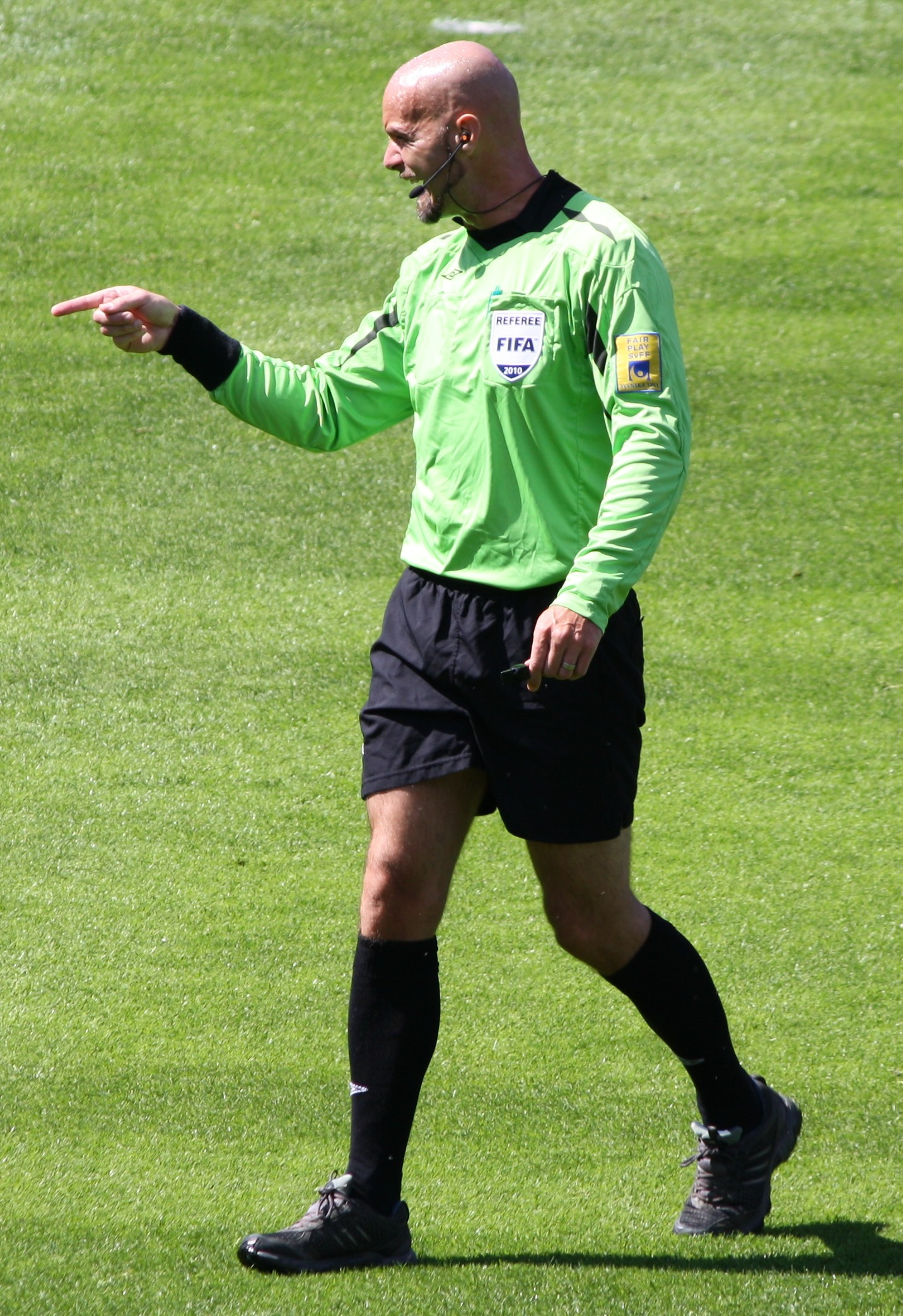
- Johannesson in 2010
- Full name: Kennet Stefan Johannesson
- Born: 22 November 1971 (age 54); Sweden
- Other occupation: Full-time referee

Domestic
Years	League	Role
2000–	Superettan	Referee
2001–	Allsvenskan	Referee

International
Years	League	Role
2003–2017	FIFA listed	Referee

Stefan Johannesson (born 22 November 1971) is a Swedish football referee. Johannesson currently resides in Täby. He was a full international referee for FIFA between 2003 and 2017. He became a professional referee in 1994 and has been an Allsvenskan referee since 2001. Johannesson has refereed 235 matches in Allsvenskan, 32 matches in Superettan and 79 international matches as of 2014.

== See also ==
- List of football referees
