= Fredrik Andersson (footballer, born 1988) =

Swedish footballer

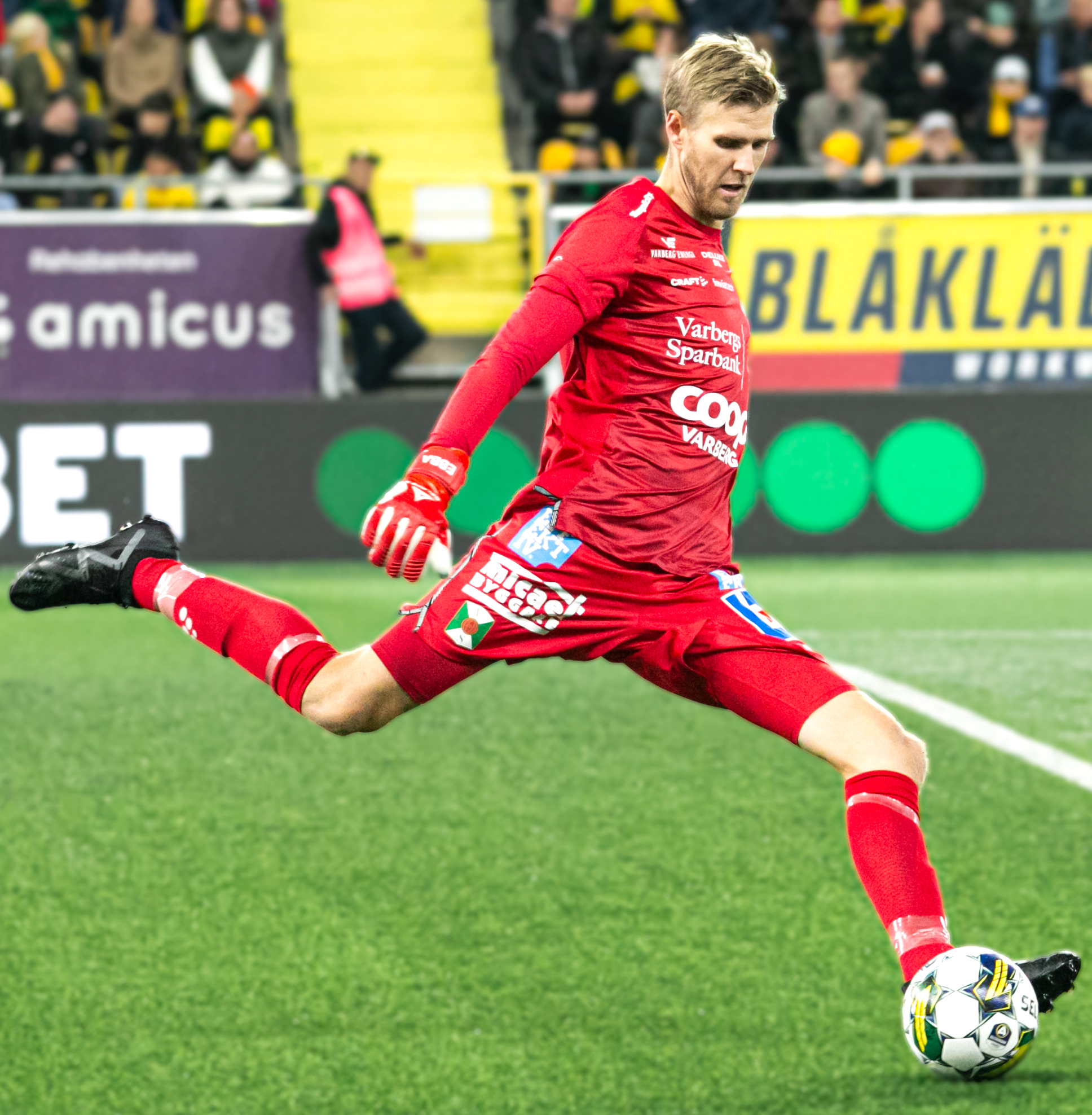

Personal information
- Full name: Hans Fredrik Andersson
- Date of birth: 25 October 1988 (age 38)
- Place of birth: Skene, Sweden
- Height: 1.96 m (6 ft 5 in)
- Position: Goalkeeper

Youth career
- –2007: Skene IF

Senior career*
Years	Team	Apps	(Gls)
2008–2010	Skene IF	47	(0)
2011–2015	Örgryte IS	48	(0)
2015–2018	Malmö FF	10	(0)
2019–2021	Örgryte IS	87	(0)
2022–2025	Varbergs BoIS	86	(0)
2026	IFK Göteborg	0	(0)
- * Club domestic league appearances and goals as of 10:34, 14 March 2026 (UTC)

Fredrik Andersson (born 25 October 1988) is a Swedish footballer who plays as a goalkeeper. He last played for IFK Göteborg.

== Club career ==
Andersson started his senior career at his youth club Skene IF. After just one season with the senior team he moved to Division 1 club Örgryte IS. He served as a back-up for three seasons before he became a regular starter in 2014. After an impressive year-and-a-half as the first choice goalkeeper he was signed by reigning Swedish Champions Malmö FF on 27 July 2015. On 26 October 2016 Andersson made his first team debut for Malmö FF when he replaced an injured Johan Wiland with 13 minutes to go of the title decider against Falkenbergs FF. Malmö were in the lead by 3–0 at that point, which was also the final score of the game.

== Honours ==
Örgryte IS

- Division 1 Södra: 2012

Malmö FF

- Allsvenskan: 2016, 2017
