= Erik Andersson (footballer) =

Swedish footballer

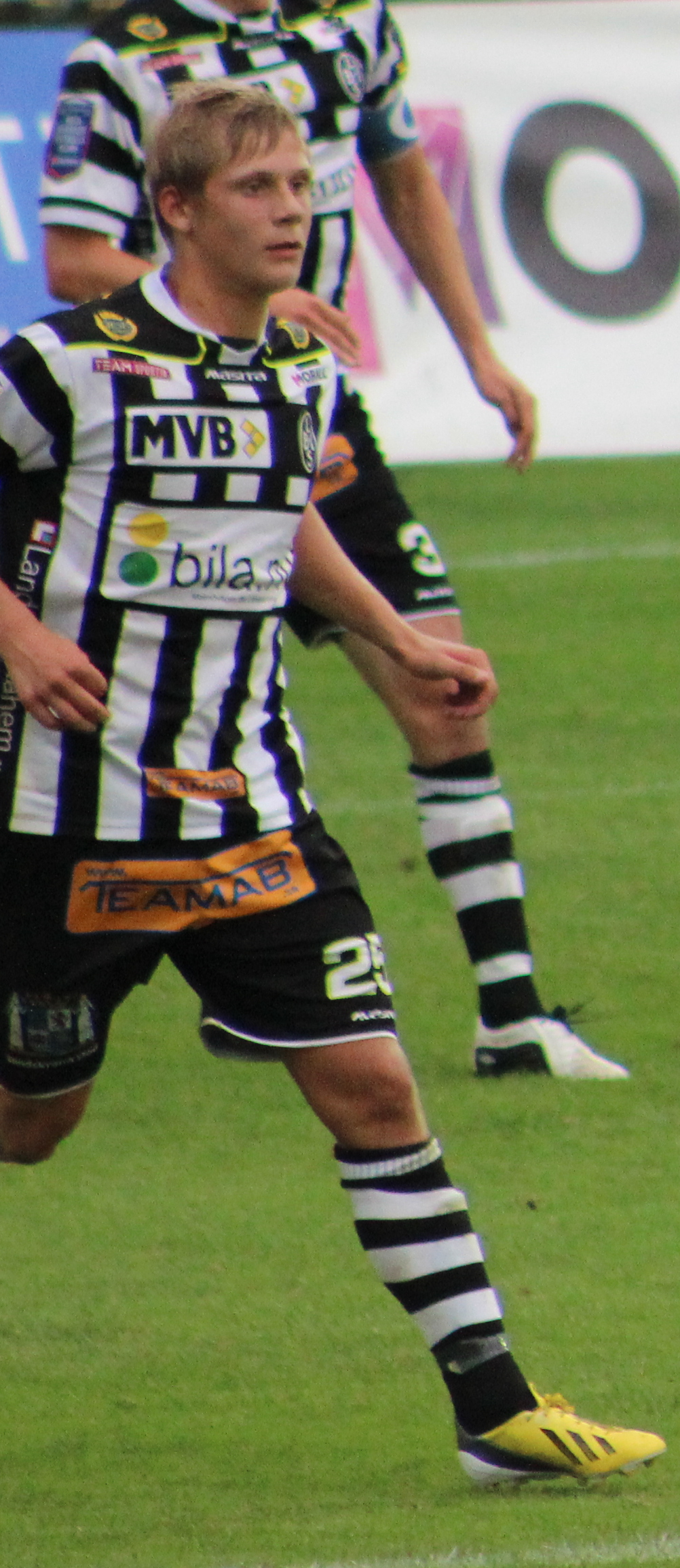

Personal information
- Full name: Erik Mats Simon Andersson
- Date of birth: 3 May 1997 (age 29)
- Place of birth: Sweden
- Height: 1.79 m (5 ft 10 in)
- Position: Midfielder

Team information
- Current team: FC Lahti
- Number: 14

Youth career
- IK Wormo
- Landskrona BoIS

Senior career*
Years	Team	Apps	(Gls)
2012–2014	Landskrona BoIS	51	(6)
2015–2017	Malmö FF	0	(0)
2016–2017	→ Trelleborgs FF (loan)	39	(4)
2018–2020	Trelleborgs FF	78	(10)
2021–2023	GIF Sundsvall	78	(11)
2024	Helsingør	7	(0)
2024–2025	Örebro SK	39	(4)
2026–	FC Lahti	23	(1)

International career
2012–2014	Sweden U17	18	(3)
2015–2017	Sweden U19	9	(2)
- * Club domestic league appearances and goals as of 13 November 2026

Erik Mats Simon Andersson (born 3 May 1997) is a Swedish footballer who plays for Veikkausliiga club FC Lahti as a midfielder.

== Career ==
Erik Andersson made his debut for Landskrona BoIS as a 15-year-old, on 29 October 2012. He scored his first goal in the same match, a 3–2 victory over Jönköpings Södra IF. The goal made Andersson the youngest ever goalscorer in Superettan.

On 1 January 2015 Andersson signed a four-year-contract with Malmö FF. During his time in Malmö, Andersson struggled with injuries and left the club with only one cup appearance. Andersson was loaned to Trelleborgs FF during the 2016 and 2017 season. After helping TFF to promotion, he signed permanently for the Allsvenskan newcomer on 10 January 2018. He made his Allsvenskan debut on 1 April 2018 against IFK Göteborg and scored his first Allsvenskan goal on 8 April 2018 against Djurgården.

On 5 January 2024, Andersson signed a contract with Helsingør in Denmark until 30 June 2026. In July 2024, he moved to Örebro SK.

== Career statistics ==
As of 27 November 2018.

Club	Season	League			Cup		Continental		Total	
Club	Season	Division	Apps	Goals	Apps	Goals	Apps	Goals	Apps	Goals
Landskrona BoIS	2012	Superettan	2	1	0	0	—		2	1
Landskrona BoIS	2013	Superettan	22	2	2	0	—		24	2
Landskrona BoIS	2014	Superettan	27	3	1	1	—		28	4
Landskrona BoIS	Total		51	6	3	1	0	0	54	7
Malmö FF	2015	Allsvenskan	0	0	1	0	0	0	1	0
Malmö FF	2016	Allsvenskan	0	0	0	0	—		0	0
Malmö FF	Total		0	0	1	0	0	0	1	0
Trelleborgs FF	2016	Superettan	16	0	0	0	—		16	0
Trelleborgs FF	2017	Superettan	23	4	0	0	—		23	4
Trelleborgs FF	2018	Allsvenskan	19	2	3	0	—		22	2
Trelleborgs FF	Total		58	6	3	0	0	0	61	6
Career total			109	12	7	1	0	0	116	13
