= 2013 Malmö FF season =

Malmö FF
2013 season
- Chairman: Håkan Jeppsson
- Manager: Rikard Norling
- Stadium: Swedbank Stadion
- Allsvenskan: 1st
- 2012–13 Svenska Cupen: Group stage
- Svenska Supercupen: Winners
- 2013–14 UEFA Europa League: Third qualifying round
- Top goalscorer: League: Magnus Eriksson (11); All: Magnus Eriksson (14)
- Highest home attendance: 23,758 vs. Syrianska FC (3 November 2013, Allsvenskan)
- Lowest home attendance: 1,354 vs. GIF Sundsvall (16 March 2013, Svenska Cupen)
- Average home league attendance: 16,093 (in Allsvenskan); 13,140 (in all competitions)
Home colours	Away colours	Third colours

The 2013 season was Malmö FF's 102nd in existence, their 78th season in Allsvenskan and their 13th consecutive season in the league. They competed in Allsvenskan where they finished first, 2012–13 Svenska Cupen where they were knocked out in the group stage, Svenska Supercupen where they won the competition against IFK Göteborg and the 2013–14 UEFA Europa League where they were knocked out in the third qualifying round. Malmö FF also participated in one competition in which the club continued playing in for the 2014 season, 2013–14 Svenska Cupen. The season began with the group stage of Svenska Cupen in March, league play started in April and lasted until November, Svenska Supercupen was the last competitive match of the season.

A new captain was announced since former captain Ulrich Vinzents left the squad as well as former vice captain and previous captain Daniel Andersson who announced his retirement from professional football in November 2012. Third captain Jiloan Hamad took over the captaincy. The club won their 17th Swedish championship title and 20th Allsvenskan title on 28 October 2013 when they defeated reigning champions IF Elfsborg in an away fixture at Borås Arena in the penultimate round of the league.

== Summary ==
=== Allsvenskan ===
The league season started in late March 2013 and ended in early November 2013. The official season fixtures were released on 14 December 2012. Malmö FF started the season with a home fixture against newcomers Halmstads BK on 1 April which ended in a 1–1 draw. There was no longer break in the match schedule even though Sweden hosted the UEFA Women's Euro 2013 between 10 and 28 July, although there was shorter breaks due to international fixtures. Malmö FF ended the season at home against Syrianska FC with a 3–1 win on 3 November.

After the draw in the opening game the club won four games in a row against Åtvidabergs FF, Kalmar FF, AIK and Östers IF, two of which were at home and two which were away games. This resulted in Malmö FF positioning themselves second in the league table after IFK Göteborg with the same number of points albeit with a lesser goal difference. The next match after the four win streak was the away game against IFK Göteborg. This match ended 1–1 after Göteborg scored the equalizer in the last minute of the game. A 1–1 draw in the next home game against IFK Norrköping still kept the club at second place in the table, although their first loss of the season in the next game, the away fixture against Djurgårdens IF, saw Malmö FF drop to a fifth place in the league table. The win-less streak continued in the next two games. Malmö FF drew 2–2 in the away game against Mjällby AIF, thus continuing Malmö FF's difficult history at Strandvallen, Malmö FF have never won an away fixture against Mjällby at Strandvallen in eight tries since 1980. For the 10th round Malmö FF faced Helsingborgs IF in the Scanian derby at home. The match was attended by a season best of 23,730 spectators and resulted in a 1–1 draw. With a third of the league matches played Malmö FF had gathered 17 points and positioned themselves fourth in the league table after leaders Helsingborg, IFK Göteborg and last years winners IF Elfsborg.

Malmö FF then won three games in a row, two away games against IF Brommapojkarna and Syrianska FC as well as the home game against top rivals Elfsborg. Despite this, the club remained in 4th position. This was followed by a rare home defeat against last years runners up BK Häcken with 3–1. This was followed up by two home wins which saw Malmö FF advance up to second place in the league table behind Helsingborg. In the middle of European play in the UEFA Europa League the club lost the following away fixture against fellow European qualifying contender Gefle IF. This match was once again followed by a string of wins leading up to the 20th round of matches. On 11 August the club beat fellow title contender AIK 1–0 in Malmö in a match that meant that Malmö FF went three points ahead of AIK and with the same number of points as leaders Helsingborg. Malmö FF secured pole position in the table in the following fixture when they beat Kalmar FF at Guldfågeln Arena on 18 August with 4–1, Kalmar's first home defeat of the season. With only ten matches left of the season Malmö FF was in the lead with 41 points. Helsinborg, IFK Göteborg and AIK trailed the club with 38 points respectively.

The next fixture was Malmö FF vs IFK Göteborg at Swedbank Stadion which Malmö FF won 3–1 after having been down 0–1 after 17 minutes of play. This fixture established Malmö FF as the top contender for the title. Next followed a 1–1 draw in the away fixture against Östers IF before a two-week international break. Malmö FF followed up the break by losing at home against Djurgårdens IF who they had previously lost against in the away fixture earlier in the season. Nevertheless, of this streak of two win-less matches Malmö FF stayed at the top of the table. The club went on to win three consecutive fixtures in which the away match against Helsingborgs IF was crucial as this put Malmö FF six points ahead of their rivals and kept the gap down to IFK Göteborg who was now their primary title contender. The club then later had the opportunity to increase their lead to seven points in the away fixture against BK Häcken as IFK Göteborg had lost their match against Djurgårdens IF just moments before the start of the game at Rambergsvallen. However this failed as Häcken took their second win of the season against Malmö FF.

Nevertheless, Malmö FF still had the opportunity to win the title if they could win two of the remaining three fixtures. In the next fixture at home against IF Bromapojkarna the away side equalized Malmö FF's early lead and held the club to a draw until the 86th minute when Guillermo Molins scored the winning goal, Molins had also scored the first goal of the game. This meant that the club had the opportunity to clinch the league title with a win in the away fixture against IF Elfsborg at Borås Arena in Borås on 28 October. Up until the final hours prior to the match it was uncertain if the match could be played due to weather conditions caused by the St Jude storm that affected the whole of south-west Sweden at the time. However the match official deemed that the match could go ahead and 4,000 to 5,000 Malmö FF who had travelled the 30 miles from Malmö were let into the stands. The match was eventually won 2–0 by Malmö FF after two goals from Molins yet again. This meant that the club had won its 20th Allsvenskan title and 17th Swedish championship title. This was the first time the club had secured a Swedish championship in an away fixture since the 1977 season, that time also in Borås at Ryavallen. The last match of the season was the home fixture against Syrianska FC on 3 November. Malmö FF quickly opened the scoring with three goals in the game's first 19 minutes. Syrianska eventually reduced the lead to 3–1 which was the game's final result. 23,758 people attended the game at Swedbank Stadion, this season's best attendance ahead of the home fixture against Helsingborg. Daniel Andersson was substituted into play in the 84th minute of play to celebrate the end of his playing career. After the match the team was awarded Lennart Johanssons Pokal by previous UEFA and Swedish Football Association president himself, Lennart Johansson.

=== Svenska Cupen ===
Malmö FF qualified for the group stage of the 2012–13 Svenska Cupen in the 2012 season by beating Sandvikens IF after extra time in round 2 in August 2012. The club was later seeded third in the group stage draw after finishing third in the 2012 Allsvenskan. The groups were drawn in November 2012 and Malmö FF were drawn against newly relegated GIF Sundsvall, newly promoted Östers IF and Division 1 club IK Frej. The group stage was played in early March 2013 before the start of the league season.

Malmö FF played their first cup match of the new year against Östers IF on 2 March 2013 at Malmö Stadion, the match finished in a draw 1–1. The second fixture was played against IK Frej who had beaten GIF Sundsvall 2–1 in the previous home fixture. The match which ended 2–0 in Malmö FF's favour was played on 10 March 2013 at Skytteholms IP in Solna. Östers IF had played their last group fixture against IK Frej three days prior to Malmö FF's last fixture, that match ended 5–0 for Östers IF. This meant that Malmö FF were forced to win their match against GIF Sundsvall with at least five goals to progress to the quarter-finals on superior goal difference. The match against GIF Sundsvall was played at Limhamns IP in Malmö and ended 4–1 to Malmö FF. This meant that the club finished second in the group, and therefore missed advancement to the quarter-finals, with seven points, this was as many points as Östers IF but with a lesser goal difference of +5 in comparison to Östers IF's +7.

Malmö FF entered the new cup season in the second round which was played on 21 August 2013. The club was drawn against Division 2 side Sävedalens IF and the match was played away in Partille. Malmö FF won 6–0 and progressed to the group stage which was played in March 2014.

=== Svenska Supercupen ===
Malmö FF qualified for the 2013 Svenska Supercupen by winning the 2013 Allsvenskan on 28 October 2013. The match was played at home at Swedbank Stadion on 10 November 2013 and the club's opponents was 2012–13 Svenska Cupen winners IFK Göteborg. This was the second time that the club competed in Svenska Supercupen and it was the club's second attempt to win the competition after having failed the first time in 2011 against Helsingborgs IF. The match ended in a 3–2 win for Malmö FF after Emil Forsberg scored two goals and Guillermo Molins scored the third and winning goal in injury time.

=== UEFA Europa League ===
Malmö FF qualified for the 2013–14 UEFA Europa League by merit of finishing third in the 2012 Allsvenskan. The club entered the competition in the first round of qualification. The draws for the first and second qualifying rounds were held on 24 June 2013, Malmö FF was seeded in both the draw for the first qualifying round and the second qualifying round. Malmö FF were drawn against Irish club Drogheda United in the first qualifying round. The first leg in Dublin on 4 July ended 0–0 and the second leg on 11 July in Malmö ended with a 2–0 victory for Malmö FF, this resulted in a 2–0 aggregate score for Malmö FF to take the club through to the second qualifying round. Malmö FF played Scottish club Hibernian F.C. in the second qualifying round on 18 and 25 July. The first match at home was won 2–0 and the match in Edinburgh ended in a decisive 7–0 victory for Malmö FF to win with a 9–0 aggregate score. Malmö FF were not seeded in the draw for the third qualifying round which resulted in the winner of Malmö FF and Hibernian facing Swansea City from the English Premier League. The first leg of the match was played in Swansea on 1 August and ended in a 4–0 victory for the home side. The second leg played in Malmö on 8 August ended in a goalless draw which confirmed the aggregate score to 4–0 in favour of Swansea City.

== Key events ==
- 25 October 2012: Forward Petter Thelin joins the club on a three-year contract, transferring from Kramfors-Alliansen.
- 1 November 2012: Defender Ulrich Vinzents leaves the club on free transfer.
- 5 November 2012: Midfielder Wílton Figueiredo leaves the club on free transfer.
- 7 November 2012: Forward Daniel Larsson leaves the club, transferring to Real Valladolid.
- 13 November 2012: Goalkeeper Zlatan Azinović leaves the club on free transfer.
- 16 November 2012: Defender Daniel Andersson announces the end of his professional playing career.
- 23 November 2012: Goalkeeper Sixten Mohlin, midfielder Pawel Cibicki and defenders Alexander Blomqvist and Pa Konate are all promoted to the first team squad on a youth contract basis.
- 30 November 2012: Midfielder Petar Petrović is promoted to the first team squad on a youth contract basis.
- 3 December 2012: Midfielder Markus Halsti signs a new two-year contract, keeping him at the club until the end of the 2014 season.
- 10 December 2012: Midfielder Emil Forsberg joins the club on a four-year contract, transferring from GIF Sundsvall.
- 12 December 2012: Defender Erik Johansson joins the club on a four-year contract, transferring from GAIS.
- 19 December 2012: Forward Alexander Nilsson and defender Tobias Malm leaves the club on loan to Landskrona BoIS for the duration of the season.
- 20 December 2012: Forward Benjamin Fadi joins the club on a four-year contract, transferring from Heart of Lions.
- 14 January 2013: Defender Jasmin Sudić leaves the club on loan to Mjällby AIF for the duration of the season.
- 21 January 2013: Forward Magnus Eriksson joins the club on a four-year contract, transferring from Gent.
- 22 February 2013: Defender Filip Stenström leaves the club on loan to Ängelholms FF for the duration of the season.
- 28 March 2013: Midfielder Simon Kroon signs a new three-year contract, his first contract for the first team, keeping him at the club until the end of the 2015 season.
- 29 March 2013: Midfielder Amin Nazari leaves the club on loan to Assyriska FF for the duration of the season. At the same time he signs a new three-year contract, keeping him at the club until the end of the 2015 season.
- 2 April 2013: Forward Petter Thelin leaves the club on loan to IF Limhamn Bunkeflo for the duration of the season.
- 23 April 2013: Forward Tokelo Rantie joins the club on a permanent basis, signing a four-year contract to keep him at the club until the end of the 2016 season.
- 17 June 2013: Midfielder Erdal Rakip is promoted to the first team squad on a youth contract basis, signing a two-and-a-half-year contract to keep him at the club until the end of the 2015 season.
- 18 June 2013: Defender Johan Hammar joins the club on a six months contract, transferring from Everton.
- 1 August 2013: Defender Filip Stenström leaves the club, transferring to Ängelholms FF.
- 11 August 2013: Midfielder Guillermo Molins joins the club on a three-year contract, transferring from Anderlecht.
- 28 August 2013: Forward Tokelo Rantie leaves the club, transferring to Bournemouth.

== Players ==
=== Squad ===
Note: Flags indicate national team as defined under FIFA eligibility rules; some limited exceptions apply. Players may hold more than one non-FIFA nationality.

No.	Pos.	Nation	Player
2	DF	SWE	Matias Concha
3	DF	SWE	Miiko Albornoz
5	DF	SWE	Pontus Jansson
6	MF	FIN	Markus Halsti
7	FW	SWE	Magnus Eriksson
8	MF	SWE	Erik Friberg
9	FW	SWE	Dardan Rexhepi
10	MF	SWE	Jiloan Hamad (captain)
11	MF	SWE	Simon Thern
14	MF	SWE	Simon Kroon
15	DF	SWE	Filip Helander
17	MF	SWE	Ivo Pękalski
18	DF	SWE	Johan Hammar
19	FW	GHA	Benjamin Fadi

No.	Pos.	Nation	Player
20	DF	BRA	Ricardinho
21	DF	SWE	Erik Johansson
24	MF	SWE	Guillermo Molins
25	GK	DEN	Robin Olsen
27	GK	SWE	Johan Dahlin (vice captain)
29	FW	RSA	Tokelo Rantie
30	GK	SWE	Sixten Mohlin
31	MF	SWE	Erdal Rakip
32	DF	SWE	Pa Konate
33	MF	SWE	Emil Forsberg
34	DF	SWE	Alexander Blomqvist
35	MF	SWE	Pawel Cibicki
36	MF	SWE	Petar Petrović

=== Squad stats ===
Number	Position	Name	2013 Allsvenskan		2012–13 Svenska Cupen 2013–14 Svenska Cupen 2013 Svenska Supercupen		2013–14 UEFA Europa League		Total	
Number	Position	Name	Appearances	Goals	Appearances	Goals	Appearances	Goals	Appearances	Goals
2	DF	Matias Concha	7	0	4	0	0	0	11	0
3	DF	Miiko Albornoz	26	1	1	0	6	1	33	2
4	DF	Daniel Andersson	2	0	0	0	0	0	2	0
5	DF	Pontus Jansson	24	1	4	0	6	0	34	1
6	MF	Markus Halsti	28	2	4	0	6	1	38	3
7	FW	Magnus Eriksson	30	11	4	1	6	2	40	14
8	MF	Erik Friberg	27	6	5	0	6	0	38	6
9	FW	Dardan Rexhepi	17	1	2	1	0	0	19	2
10	MF	Jiloan Hamad	28	8	4	1	6	2	38	11
11	MF	Simon Thern	29	4	2	0	5	0	36	4
14	MF	Simon Kroon	17	2	5	2	4	2	26	6
15	DF	Filip Helander	18	0	3	0	2	0	23	0
17	MF	Ivo Pękalski	1	0	3	1	0	0	4	1
18	DF	Johan Hammar	1	0	0	0	0	0	1	0
19	FW	Benjamin Fadi	2	0	1	1	0	0	3	1
20	DF	Ricardinho	27	0	4	0	6	0	37	0
21	DF	Erik Johansson	17	0	3	2	5	0	26	2
24	MF	Guillermo Molins	11	8	2	1	0	0	13	9
25	GK	Robin Olsen	10	0	1	0	0	0	11	0
27	GK	Johan Dahlin	22	0	4	0	6	0	32	0
29	FW	Tokelo Rantie	21	7	2	2	6	1	29	10
30	GK	Sixten Mohlin	0	0	0	0	0	0	0	0
31	MF	Erdal Rakip	1	0	1	0	1	0	3	0
32	DF	Pa Konate	6	0	1	0	0	0	7	0
33	MF	Emil Forsberg	28	5	5	2	6	2	39	9
34	DF	Alexander Blomqvist	1	0	0	0	0	0	1	0
35	MF	Pawel Cibicki	7	0	3	1	4	0	14	1
36	MF	Petar Petrović	4	0	0	0	2	0	6	0

=== Players in/out ===
==== In ====
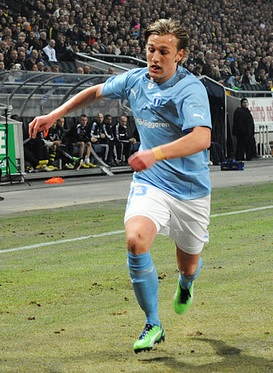
Midfielder Emil Forsberg joined Malmö FF from GIF Sundsvall

No.	Pos.	Nat.	Name	Age	EU	Moving from	Type	Transfer window	Ends	Transfer fee	Source
26	FW	(Sweden)	Petter Thelin	17	EU	Kramfors-Alliansen	Transfer	Winter	2015	N/A	mff.se
23	DF	(Sweden)	Tobias Malm	20	EU	Trelleborgs FF	Loan return	Winter	2014	N/A	trelleborgsff.se
30	GK	(Sweden)	Sixten Mohlin	16	EU	Youth system	Promoted	Winter	undisclosed	N/A	mff.se
35	MF	(Poland)	Pawel Cibicki	18	EU	Youth system	Promoted	Winter	undisclosed	N/A	mff.se
34	DF	(Sweden)	Alexander Blomqvist	18	EU	Youth system	Promoted	Winter	undisclosed	N/A	mff.se
32	DF	(Sweden)	Pa Konate	18	EU	Youth system	Promoted	Winter	undisclosed	N/A	mff.se
36	MF	(Sweden)	Petar Petrović	17	EU	Youth system	Promoted	Winter	undisclosed	N/A	mff.se
33	MF	(Sweden)	Emil Forsberg	21	EU	GIF Sundsvall	Transfer	Winter	2016	N/A	mff.se
21	DF	(Sweden)	Erik Johansson	24	EU	GAIS	Transfer	Winter	2016	N/A	mff.se
19	FW	(Ghana)	Benjamin Fadi	18	Non-EU	Heart of Lions (Ghana)	Transfer	Winter	2016	N/A	mff.se
7	FW	(Sweden)	Magnus Eriksson	22	EU	Gent (Belgium)	Transfer	Winter	2016	N/A	mff.se
29	FW	(South Africa)	Tokelo Rantie	22	Non-EU	Stars Of Africa Academy	Transfer	Summer	2016	N/A	mff.se
31	MF	(Sweden)	Erdal Rakip	17	EU	Youth system	Promoted	Summer	2015	N/A	mff.se
18	DF	(Sweden)	Johan Hammar	19	EU	Everton (England)	Transfer	Summer	2013	N/A	mff.se
24	MF	(Sweden)	Guillermo Molins	24	EU	Anderlecht (Belgium)	Transfer	Summer	2016	N/A	sydsvenskan.se

==== Out ====
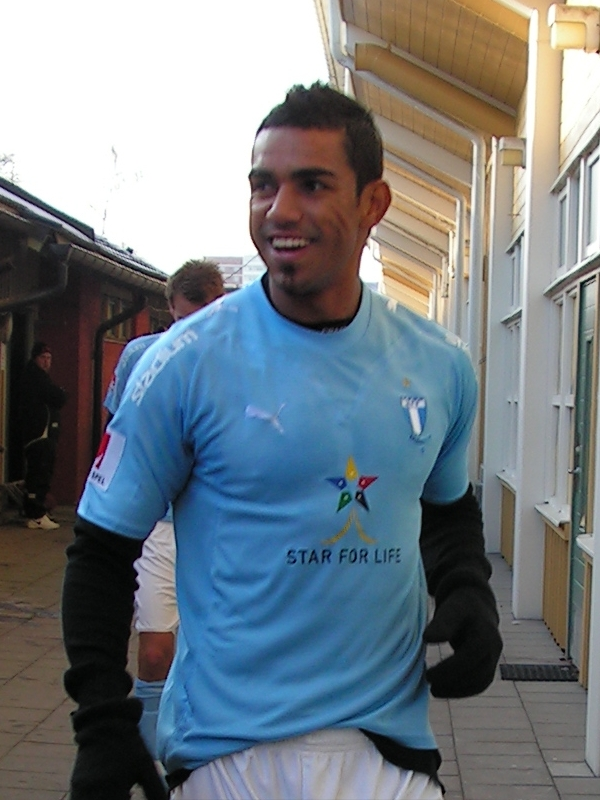
Midfielder Wílton Figueiredo left the club for Turkish side Gaziantepspor after four seasons.

No.	Pos.	Nat.	Name	Age	EU	Moving to	Type	Transfer window	Transfer fee	Source
24	MF	(Sweden)	David Löfquist	26	EU	Parma (Italy)	Loan return	Winter	N/A	mff.se
2	DF	(Denmark)	Ulrich Vinzents	36	EU	Ringsted IF (Denmark)	End of contract	Winter	N/A	mff.se
9	MF	(Brazil)	Wílton Figueiredo	30	Non-EU	Gaziantepspor (Turkey)	End of contract	Winter	N/A	mff.se
7	FW	(Sweden)	Daniel Larsson	25	EU	Valladolid (Spain)	End of contract	Winter	N/A	mff.se
30	GK	(Sweden)	Zlatan Azinović	24	EU	Kalmar FF	End of contract	Winter	N/A	fotbolltransfers.com
4	DF	(Sweden)	Daniel Andersson	35	EU		Retired	Winter	N/A	mff.se
28	FW	(Sweden)	Alexander Nilsson	20	EU	Landskrona BoIS	Loan	Winter	N/A	mff.se
23	DF	(Sweden)	Tobias Malm	20	EU	Landskrona BoIS	Loan	Winter	N/A	mff.se
3	DF	(Sweden)	Jasmin Sudić	22	EU	Mjällby AIF	Loan	Winter	N/A	mff.se
22	DF	(Sweden)	Filip Stenström	21	EU	Ängelholms FF	Loan	Winter	N/A	mff.se
18	MF	(Sweden)	Amin Nazari	19	EU	Assyriska FF	Loan	Winter	N/A	mff.se
26	FW	(Sweden)	Petter Thelin	18	EU	IF Limhamn Bunkeflo	Loan	Winter	N/A	mff.se
22	DF	(Sweden)	Filip Stenström	22	EU	Ängelholms FF	Transfer	Summer	N/A	skanskan.se
29	FW	(South Africa)	Tokelo Rantie	22	Non-EU	Bournemouth (England)	Transfer	Summer	N/A	mff.se

=== Disciplinary record ===
N	Pos.	Nat.	Name	Yellow card	Second yellow card	Red card	Notes
2	DF	(Sweden)	Concha	2	0	0	
3	DF	(Sweden)	Albornoz	1	0	0	
5	DF	(Sweden)	Jansson	2	0	0	
6	MF	(Finland)	Halsti	6	0	0	
7	FW	(Sweden)	Eriksson	2	0	0	
8	MF	(Sweden)	Friberg	4	0	0	
9	FW	(Sweden)	Rexhepi	1	0	0	
10	MF	(Sweden)	Hamad	8	0	0	
11	MF	(Sweden)	Thern	2	0	0	
15	DF	(Sweden)	Helander	3	0	0	
20	DF	(Brazil)	Ricardinho	4	0	0	
21	DF	(Sweden)	Johansson	1	0	0	
24	MF	(Sweden)	Molins	2	1	0	
29	FW	(South Africa)	Rantie	1	0	0	
32	DF	(Sweden)	Konate	1	0	0	

Source: svenskfotboll.se
Only competitive matches
(yellow card) = Number of bookings; (second yellow card) = Number of sending offs after a second yellow card; (red card) = Number of sending offs by a direct red card.
Notes: Allsvenskan only

== Club ==
=== Coaching staff ===
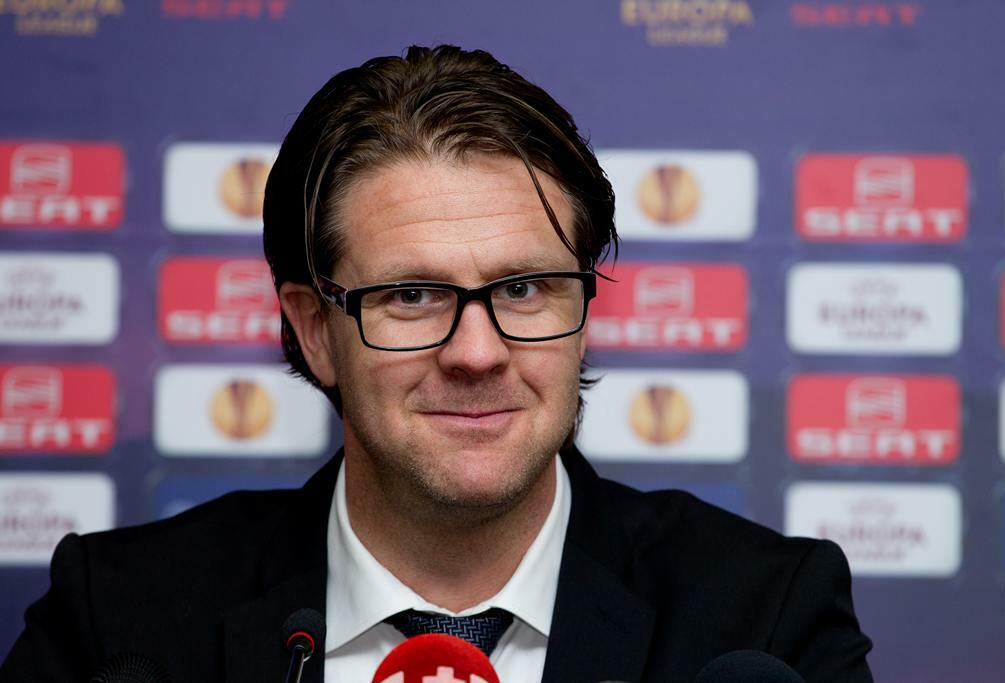
The 2013 season was Rikard Norling's third and final season with Malmö FF.

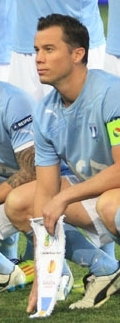
Daniel Andersson retired at the end of the 2012 season to make his position as assistant coach permanent for the 2013 season.

Name	Role
(Sweden) Rikard Norling	Head coach
(Sweden) Daniel Andersson	Assistant coach
(England) Simon Hollyhead	Assistant coach
(Sweden) Yksel Osmanovski	U-21 Coach
(Sweden) Jonnie Fedel	Goalkeeping coach
(Sweden) Greger Andrijevski	Fitness coach Masseur
(Sweden) Wilner Registre	Physiotherapist
(Sweden) Sverker Fryklund	Mental coach
(Sweden) Pär Herbertsson	Club doctor
(Sweden) Kenneth Folkesson	Equipment manager
(Sweden) Mats Engqvist	Head coach youth academy
(Sweden) Staffan Tapper	Youth talent coach
(Sweden) Vito Stavljanin	Head scout

=== Other information ===
Chairman	(Sweden) Håkan Jeppsson
Managing director	(Sweden) Per Nilsson
Director Of Sports	(Sweden) Per Ågren
Ground (capacity and dimensions)	Swedbank Stadion (24,000 / 105x70 m)

Source: Malmö FF and Swedbank Stadion

== Competitions ==
=== Overall ===
Competition	Started round	Current position / round	Final position / round	First match	Last match
Allsvenskan	N/A	—	Winner	1 April 2013	3 November 2013
Svenska Cupen	Round 2	—	Group stage	20 August 2012	16 March 2013
Svenska Supercupen	Final	—	Winner	10 November 2013	
UEFA Europa League	First qualifying round	—	Third qualifying round	4 July 2013	8 August 2013

Source: Competitions

=== Allsvenskan ===
==== League table ====
Pos	Team	Pld	W	D	L	GF	GA	GD	Pts	Qualification or relegation
1	Malmö FF (C)	30	19	6	5	56	30	+26	63	Qualification to Champions League second qualifying round
2	AIK	30	17	7	6	54	32	+22	58	Qualification to Europa League second qualifying round
3	IFK Göteborg	30	16	6	8	49	31	+18	54	Qualification to Europa League first qualifying round
4	Kalmar FF	30	14	10	6	35	26	+9	52	
5	Helsingborgs IF	30	14	7	9	61	41	+20	49	

Source: svenskfotboll.se (in Swedish)
Rules for classification: 1) points; 2) goal difference; 3) number of goals scored.
(C) Champions

==== Results summary ====
Overall								Home						Away					
Pld	W	D	L	GF	GA	GD	Pts	W	D	L	GF	GA	GD	W	D	L	GF	GA	GD
30	19	6	5	56	30	+26	63	10	3	2	26	13	+13	9	3	3	30	17	+13

Source: svenskfotboll.se (in Swedish)

==== Results by round ====
Round	1	2	3	4	5	6	7	8	9	10	11	12	13	14	15	16	17	18	19	20	21	22	23	24	25	26	27	28	29	30
Ground	H	A	H	A	H	A	H	A	A	H	A	A	H	H	H	H	A	A	H	A	H	A	H	A	A	H	A	H	A	H
Result	D	W	W	W	W	D	D	L	D	D	W	W	W	L	W	W	L	W	W	W	W	D	L	W	W	W	L	W	W	W
Position	11	5	2	2	2	2	2	5	5	4	4	5	4	4	3	2	2	2	2	1	1	1	1	1	1	1	1	1	1	1

Source: see below
A = Away; H = Home; W = Win; D = Draw; L = Loss

==== Matches ====
Kickoff times are in UTC+2 unless stated otherwise.

1 April 2013 Round 1	Malmö FF	1–1	Halmstads BK	Malmö
15:00	Rantie 48'	Report	Baldvinsson 53'	Stadium: Swedbank Stadion; Attendance: 19,577; Referee: Martin Strömbergsson (Gävle)

5 April 2013 Round 2	Åtvidabergs FF	1–3	Malmö FF	Åtvidaberg
19:00	Bergström 45+1'	Report	Eriksson 38'; Friberg 56', 67'	Stadium: Kopparvallen; Attendance: 3,501; Referee: Michael Lerjéus (Skövde)

14 April 2013 Round 3	Malmö FF	1–0	Kalmar FF	Malmö
15:00	Hamad 13'	Report		Stadium: Swedbank Stadion; Attendance: 12,736; Referee: Stefan Johannesson (Stocksund)

17 April 2013 Round 4	AIK	0–1	Malmö FF	Solna
19:05		Report	Hamad 90+2'	Stadium: Friends Arena; Attendance: 19,640; Referee: Markus Strömbergsson (Gävle)

22 April 2013 Round 5	Malmö FF	2–0	Östers IF	Malmö
19:00	Rantie 7'; Kroon 89'	Report		Stadium: Swedbank Stadion; Attendance: 12,216; Referee: Andreas Ekberg (Lund)

25 April 2013 Round 6	IFK Göteborg	1–1	Malmö FF	Gothenburg
18:30	Larsson 90+4'	Report	Rantie 29'	Stadium: Gamla Ullevi; Attendance: 17,063; Referee: Jonas Eriksson (Sigtuna)

3 May 2013 Round 7	Malmö FF	1–1	IFK Norrköping	Malmö
19:00	Thern 54'	Report	Khalili 8'	Stadium: Swedbank Stadion; Attendance: 13,155; Referee: Martin Hansson (Holmsjö)

12 May 2013 Round 8	Djurgårdens IF	3–2	Malmö FF	Stockholm
17:30	Johansson 10'; Solignac 76'; Östberg 88'	Report	Rantie 1'; Eriksson 43'	Stadium: Stockholms Stadion; Attendance: 7,492; Referee: Bojan Pandzic (Gothenburg)

17 May 2013 Round 9	Mjällby AIF	2–2	Malmö FF	Hällevik
19:00	Henderson 43'; Ekenberg 62'	Report	Kroon 60'; Eriksson 84' (pen.)	Stadium: Strandvallen; Attendance: 6,305; Referee: Michael Lerjéus (Skövde)

29 May 2013 Round 10	Malmö FF	1–1	Helsingborgs IF	Malmö
19:05	Thern 36'	Report	Santos 75'	Stadium: Swedbank Stadion; Attendance: 23,730; Referee: Markus Strömbergsson (Gävle)

1 June 2013 Round 11	IF Brommapojkarna	1–3	Malmö FF	Stockholm
13:00	Bärkroth 50'	Report	Forsberg 23', 58'; Thern 81'	Stadium: Grimsta IP; Attendance: 2,076; Referee: Kristoffer Karlsson (Helsingborg)

20 June 2013 Round 13	Syrianska FC	2–3	Malmö FF	Södertälje
19:00	Felić 66'; Sow 68'	Report	Rexhepi 42'; Rantie 79'; Hamad 82'	Stadium: Södertälje Fotbollsarena; Attendance: 2,101; Referee: Bojan Pandzic (Gothenburg)

24 June 2013 Round 14	Malmö FF	2–1	IF Elfsborg	Malmö
19:05	Hamad 24'; Rantie 76'	Report	Bangura 47'	Stadium: Swedbank Stadion; Attendance: 13,821; Referee: Stefan Johannesson (Täby)

27 June 2013 Round 12	Malmö FF	1–3	BK Häcken	Malmö
19:00	Forsberg 35'	Report	Makondele 9', 45+2'; El Kabir 33'	Stadium: Swedbank Stadion; Attendance: 11,861; Referee: Markus Strömbergsson (Gävle)

7 July 2013 Round 15	Malmö FF	3–1	Gefle IF	Malmö
15:00	Eriksson 31'; Hamad 48'; Albornoz 67'	Report	Dahlberg 34'	Stadium: Swedbank Stadion; Attendance: 9,837; Referee: Michael Lerjéus (Skövde)

14 July 2013 Round 16	Malmö FF	4–0	Åtvidabergs FF	Malmö
17:30	Eriksson 31', 48'; Friberg 62'; Forsberg 66'	Report		Stadium: Swedbank Stadion; Attendance: 10,877; Referee: Stefan Johannesson (Täby)

28 July 2013 Round 17	Gefle IF	2–0	Malmö FF	Gävle
19:00	Lundevall 13'; Oremo 48'	Report		Stadium: Strömvallen; Attendance: 5,169; Referee: Martin Hansson (Holmsjö)

4 August 2013 Round 18	Halmstads BK	1–3	Malmö FF	Halmstad
15:00	Magyar 41'	Report	Eriksson 12'; Hamad 22'; Rantie 64'	Stadium: Örjans Vall; Attendance: 6,433; Referee: Michael Lerjéus (Skövde)

11 August 2013 Round 19	Malmö FF	1–0	AIK	Malmö
17:30	Halsti 45+1'	Report		Stadium: Swedbank Stadion; Attendance: 17,518; Referee: Martin Hansson (Holmsjö)

18 August 2013 Round 20	Kalmar FF	1–4	Malmö FF	Kalmar
17:30	Silva Lima 90+4'	Report	Thern 12'; Eriksson 57'; Friberg 77'; Molins 82'	Stadium: Guldfågeln Arena; Attendance: 6,834; Referee: Martin Strömbergsson (Gävle)

25 August 2013 Round 21	Malmö FF	3–1	IFK Göteborg	Malmö
17:30	Jansson 20'; Forsberg 45'; Hamad 75'	Report	Söder 17'	Stadium: Swedbank Stadion; Attendance: 23,142; Referee: Jonas Eriksson (Sigtuna)

1 September 2013 Round 22	Östers IF	1–1	Malmö FF	Växjö
15:00	Piñones Arce 28'	Report	Eriksson 44' (pen.)	Stadium: Myresjöhus Arena; Attendance: 9,103; Referee: Johan Hamlin (Bro)

16 September 2013 Round 23	Malmö FF	0–2	Djurgårdens IF	Malmö
19:05		Report	Jawo 5', 50'	Stadium: Swedbank Stadion; Attendance: 15,751; Referee: Michael Lerjéus (Skövde)

22 September 2013 Round 24	IFK Norrköping	0–2	Malmö FF	Norrköping
17:30		Report	Molins 35'; Hamad 74'	Stadium: Idrottsparken; Attendance: 6,374; Referee: Markus Strömbergsson (Gävle)

25 September 2013 Round 25	Helsingborgs IF	0–3	Malmö FF	Helsingborg
19:07		Report	Friberg 38'; Molins 67'; Eriksson 83'	Stadium: Olympia; Attendance: 16,300; Referee: Jonas Eriksson (Stockholm)

30 September 2013 Round 26	Malmö FF	1–0	Mjällby AIF	Malmö
19:00	Friberg 84'	Report		Stadium: Swedbank Stadion; Attendance: 15,560; Referee: Johan Hamlin (Bro)

6 October 2013 Round 27	BK Häcken	2–0	Malmö FF	Gothenburg
17:30	Ericsson 35'; Lewicki 53'	Report		Stadium: Rambergsvallen; Attendance: 5,814; Referee: Markus Strömbergsson (Gävle)

20 October 2013 Round 28	Malmö FF	2–1	IF Brommapojkarna	Malmö
17:30	Molins 43', 86'	Report	Sandberg Magnusson 68'	Stadium: Swedbank Stadion; Attendance: 17,856; Referee: Martin Hansson (Holmsjö)

28 October 2013 Round 29	IF Elfsborg	0–2	Malmö FF	Borås
19:05 UTC+1		Report	Molins 36', 70'	Stadium: Borås Arena; Attendance: 12,039; Referee: Jonas Eriksson (Stockholm)

3 November 2013 Round 30	Malmö FF	3–1	Syrianska FC	Malmö
15:00 UTC+1	Molins 12'; Eriksson 15'; Halsti 19'	Report	Sleyman 87'	Stadium: Swedbank Stadion; Attendance: 23,758; Referee: Tobias Mattsson (Karlstad)

=== Svenska Cupen ===
==== 2012–13 ====
The tournament continued from the 2012 season.

Kickoff times are in UTC+2.

===== Group stage =====
Pos	Team	Pld	W	D	L	GF	GA	GD	Pts	Qualification	ÖIF	MFF	IKF	GIFS
1	Östers IF	3	2	1	0	8	1	+7	7	Advance to Knockout stage	—	—	5–0	—
2	Malmö FF	3	2	1	0	7	2	+5	7		1–1	—	—	4–1
3	IK Frej	3	1	0	2	2	8	−6	3		—	0–2	—	2–1
4	GIF Sundsvall	3	0	0	3	2	8	−6	0		0–2	—	—	—

2 March 2013 Match Day 1	Malmö FF	1–1	Östers IF	Malmö
15:00	Rexhepi 25'	Report	Robledo 32'	Stadium: Malmö Stadion; Attendance: 4,513; Referee: Andreas Ekberg (Lund)

10 March 2013 Match Day 2	IK Frej	0–2	Malmö FF	Solna
17:00		Report	Hamad 70'; Kroon 78'	Stadium: Skytteholms IP; Attendance: 1,178; Referee: Glenn Nyberg (Borlänge)

16 March 2013 Match Day 3	Malmö FF	4–1	GIF Sundsvall	Malmö
16:00	Pękalski 23'; Johansson 27', 90'; Eriksson 85'	Report	Walker 44'	Stadium: Limhamns IP; Attendance: 1,354; Referee: Bojan Pandzic (Gothenburg)

==== 2013–14 ====
The tournament continued into the 2014 season.

===== Qualification stage =====
21 August 2013 Round 2	Sävedalens IF	0–6	Malmö FF	Partille
18:30 UTC+2		Report	Rantie 29', 69'; Franklin 58' (o.g.); Kroon 67'; Fadi 84'; Cibicki 89'	Stadium: Vallhamra IP; Attendance: 2,138; Referee: Magnus Lindgren (Gothenburg)

=== Svenska Supercupen ===
10 November 2013 Final	Malmö FF	3–2	IFK Göteborg	Malmö
18:00 UTC+1	Forsberg 42', 48'; Molins 90'	Report	Haglund 45'; Vibe 55'	Stadium: Swedbank Stadion; Attendance: 2,787; Referee: Andreas Ekberg (Lund)

=== UEFA Europa League ===
Kickoff times are in UTC+2 unless stated otherwise.

==== Qualifying phase and play-off round ====
===== First qualifying round =====
4 July 2013 First Leg	Drogheda United (Republic of Ireland)	0–0	(Sweden) Malmö FF	Dublin, Republic of Ireland
19:45 UTC+1		Report		Stadium: Tallaght Stadium; Attendance: 1,496; Referee: Emir Alečković (Bosnia and Herzegovina)

11 July 2013 Second Leg	Malmö FF (Sweden)	2–0 (2–0 agg.)	(Republic of Ireland) Drogheda United	Malmö, Sweden
19:00	Forsberg 45'; Kroon 90+4'	Report		Stadium: Swedbank Stadion; Attendance: 5,689; Referee: Anatoliy Abdula (Ukraina)

===== Second qualifying round =====
18 July 2013 First Leg	Malmö FF (Sweden)	2–0	(Scotland) Hibernian	Malmö, Sweden
19:00	Hamad 11'; Eriksson 13'	Report		Stadium: Swedbank Stadion; Attendance: 8,628; Referee: Rene Eisner (Austria)

25 July 2013 Second Leg	Hibernian (Scotland)	0–7 (0–9 agg.)	(Sweden) Malmö FF	Edinburgh, Scotland
19:45 UTC+1		Report	Eriksson 21'; Forsberg 26'; Halsti 30'; Albornoz 42'; Rantie 60'; Hamad 64'; Kroon 73'	Stadium: Easter Road; Attendance: 16,018; Referee: Sébastien Delferiere (Belgium)

===== Third qualifying round =====
1 August 2013 First Leg	Swansea City (England)	4–0	(Sweden) Malmö FF	Swansea, Wales
19:45 UTC+1	Michu 37'; Bony 55', 59'; Pozuelo 86'	Report		Stadium: Liberty Stadium; Attendance: 16,176; Referee: Paolo Silvio Mazzoleni (Italy)

8 August 2013 Second Leg	Malmö FF (Sweden)	0–0 (0–4 agg.)	(England) Swansea City	Malmö, Sweden
19:45		Report		Stadium: Swedbank Stadion; Attendance: 11,538; Referee: Serdar Gözübüyük (Netherlands)

== Non competitive ==
=== Pre-season ===
Kickoff times are in UTC+1 unless stated otherwise.

1 February 2013 Friendly	D.C. United (United States)	1–1	(Sweden) Malmö FF	Bradenton, Florida, United States
11:00 UTC−5	Nane 75'	Report	Friberg 28'	Stadium: IMG Academy

7 February 2013 Friendly	New York Red Bulls (United States)	3–2	(Sweden) Malmö FF	Bradenton, Florida, United States
13:00 UTC−5	Henry 27'; Moreno 86'; Domingues 88'	Report	Friberg 3'; Rexhepi 53'	Stadium: IMG Academy

15 February 2013 Friendly	Malmö FF (Sweden)	3–1	(Denmark) OB	Malmö, Sweden
13:00	Eriksson 3', 14'; Rexhepi 74'	Report	Kadrii 13'	Stadium: Limhamns IP; Attendance: 1,307; Referee: Andreas Ekberg (Lund)

24 February 2013 Friendly	FC Nordsjælland (Denmark)	2–0	(Sweden) Malmö FF	Farum, Denmark
13:00	Lindberg 47'; Bech 69'	Report		Stadium: Farum Park

23 March 2013 Friendly	Malmö FF	0–0	BK Häcken	Malmö, Sweden
15:00		Report		Stadium: Limhamns IP; Attendance: 942; Referee: Martin Hansson (Holmsjö)

=== Mid-season ===
Kickoff times are in UTC+2 unless stated otherwise.

21 May 2013 Friendly	Malmö FF (Sweden)	1–2	(Germany) Schalke 04	Malmö, Sweden
19:00	Rantie 38'	Report	Matip 82'; Raffael 90'	Stadium: Swedbank Stadion; Attendance: 3,167

11 October 2013 Friendly	Malmö FF (Sweden)	0–1	(Denmark) FC Nordsjælland	Malmö, Sweden
12:00		Report	Vingaard 39'	Stadium: Hästhagens IP; Attendance: 612
