= Dardan Rexhepi =

Association football player (born 1992)

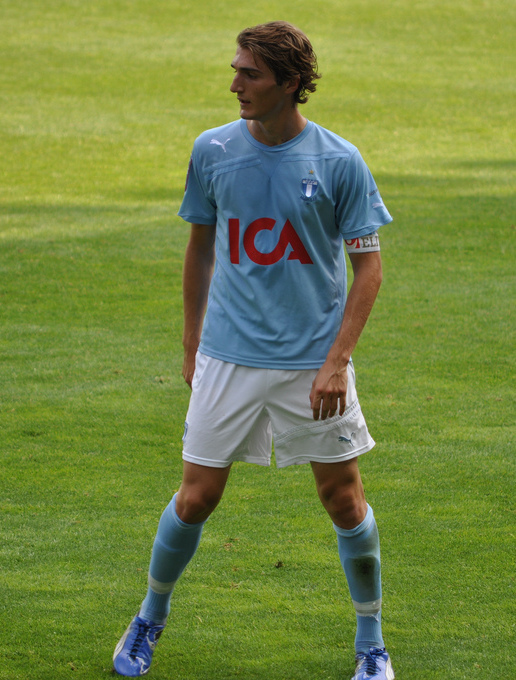
- Rexhepi playing for Malmö FF in 2011

Personal information
- Date of birth: 16 January 1992 (age 34)
- Place of birth: Pristina, SFR Yugoslavia
- Height: 1.90 m (6 ft 3 in)
- Position: Striker

Youth career
- 1997–2003: Eslövs BK
- 2003–2009: Lunds BK
- 2009–2010: Malmö FF

Senior career*
Years	Team	Apps	(Gls)
2010–2013	Malmö FF	63	(4)
2014	IF Brommapojkarna	27	(5)
2015–2016	BK Häcken	22	(1)
2016–2017	GAIS	33	(8)
2019–2020	Norrby IF	49	(10)

International career
2010–2011	Sweden U19	4	(2)
2011–2013	Sweden U21	5	(2)
2014–2015	Kosovo	3	(0)
- * Club domestic league appearances and goals as of 27 July 2020

Dardan Rexhepi (born 16 January 1992) is a professional footballer who plays as a striker. He was raised in Sweden and played for their youth football teams before playing for the senior Kosovo national team.

== Club career ==
=== Malmö FF ===
Rexhepi moved from Lunds BK to Malmö FF in 2009. After scoring 38 goals in 43 games for the youth team he was promoted to the first team squad the following year. In his debut match for the first team against Syrianska FC in Svenska Cupen on 18 May 2010 he scored the winning goal in extra time. On 15 September the same year he started his first match in Allsvenskan in the derby and top-match against Helsingborgs IF in which he also scored his first league goal, which proved to be the winning goal as Malmö FF won 2–0, the second goal in the same game was assisted by Rexhepi. The win against Helsingborg would prove to be crucial for the championship as Malmö FF won the league a few games later only 2 points more than Helsingborg. He has since earned the nickname "D-Rex".

Rexhepi had a minor breakthrough for the 2011 season and played 23 matches and scored one goal. He also played for the club in the qualifying stages to the 2011–12 UEFA Champions League and in the group stage of the 2011–12 UEFA Europa League. The 2012 season proved to be a tougher challenge for Rexhepi as he received less play than the previous season. In total Rexhepi played 13 out of 30 matches for Malmö FF during the season and walked away goalless in league play. Rexhepi played 17 matches and scored one goal during the league title winning 2013 season, however he was still the third choice attacker behind Magnus Eriksson and Tokelo Rantie in the beginning of the season and then Eriksson and Guillermo Molins in the end of the season.

=== IF Brommapojkarna ===
On 21 January 2014, Rexhepi signed for fellow Allsvenskan club IF Brommapojkarna, citing that he needed more time on the pitch to continue develop as a player. Malmö FF acknowledged that a buy-back agreement existed in the transfer and that they would follow Rexhepi's development in Brommapojkarna.

=== BK Häcken ===
In January 2015, Rexhepi signed for Allsvenskan club BK Häcken.

=== Norrby IF ===
After two years without any club, Rexhepi signed a one-year contract with Norrby IF for the 2019 season. The striker did not represent any club at the elite level from 2017 to 2018, as he instead wanted to invest in a civil career and, among other things, worked for a couple of weeks this summer as a municipal director in Kungsbacka.

== International career ==
Rexhepi made his debut for Sweden U21 on 24 March 2011 in a training match against Italy U21.

He made his senior debut for Kosovo in a May 2014 friendly match against Turkey and earned a total of 3 caps, scoring no goals. His final international was a September 2014 friendly against Oman.

== Career statistics ==
As of 6 October 2013

Appearances and goals by club, season and competition
Club	Season	League		Cup		Continental		Total	
Club	Season	Apps	Goals	Apps	Goals	Apps	Goals	Apps	Goals
Malmö FF	2010	10	2	1	1	—		11	3
Malmö FF	2011	23	1	2	0	7	1	32	2
Malmö FF	2012	13	0	1	0	—		14	0
Malmö FF	2013	17	1	2	1	0	0	19	2
Malmö FF	Total	63	4	6	2	7	1	76	7
IF Brommapojkarna	2014	0	0	0	0	—		0	0
Career total		63	4	6	2	7	1	76	7

== Honours ==
Malmö FF

- Allsvenskan: 2010, 2013
- Svenska Supercupen: 2013
