= Johan Dahlin =

Swedish footballer

- Dahlin playing for Malmö FF in 2023

Personal information
- Full name: Johan Helge Dahlin
- Date of birth: 8 September 1986 (age 40)
- Place of birth: Trollhättan, Sweden
- Height: 1.91 m (6 ft 3 in)
- Position: Goalkeeper

Team information
- Current team: Malmö FF
- Number: 27

Youth career
- –2003: FC Trollhättan

Senior career*
Years	Team	Apps	(Gls)
2003	FC Trollhättan	1	(0)
2004	Åsebro IF	18	(0)
2005–2009	Lyn	30	(0)
2008	→ Trelleborgs FF (loan)	14	(0)
2009–2013	Malmö FF	104	(0)
2014–2015	Gençlerbirliği	20	(0)
2015–2017	FC Midtjylland	39	(0)
2017–	Malmö FF	172	(0)

International career
2006–2009	Sweden U21	24	(0)
2009–2014	Sweden	4	(0)
- * Club domestic league appearances and goals as of 20 July 2026

Johan Helge Dahlin (born 8 September 1986) is a Swedish professional footballer who plays as a goalkeeper for Malmö FF.

== Club career ==
=== FC Lyn ===
Dahlin was born in Trollhättan. He began his senior career at Åsebro IF in 2004. After one season with the Division 3 side, he was invited to Oslo, Norway, to train with Lyn and was subsequently signed until the end of the 2009 season.

In 2005, Dahlin was third-choice keeper behind Ali Al-Habsi and Nuno Marques. With both Al-Habsi and Marques gone after the season, and having made a good impression during the winter months, Dahlin became manager Henning Berg's preferred choice in goal, ahead of newcomer Eddie Gustafsson. He made thirteen appearances in the first half of the 2006 season. His debut came against Start in the league opener on 9 April, a game that ended in a goalless draw. After the summer, the roles were reversed and Dahlin received little playing time, only making one more appearance when he came on a substitute for an injured Gustafsson. For his performance in 2006, Dahlin received his first call-ups to the Swedish under-21 team, making six appearances in total that year.

In 2007, Dahlin acted mainly as a backup for Eddie Gustafsson, making only four appearances all season, and it became clear that Gustafsson would also be the first choice in goal in 2008. Therefore, in a bid to receive playing time at a high level, Dahlin agreed to a loan deal with Swedish side Trelleborgs FF. He returned to Lyn in August 2008, having made fourteen appearances in the Allsvenskan.

=== Malmö FF ===
On 8 July 2009, Dahlin was announced as a Malmö FF player. He instantly became first choice as goalkeeper and played for a majority of the games of the later season, 2009. However, it emerged that Dahlin had chronic back pains which made him unable to play in a couple of games. These problems continued during the 2010 season but as Dahlin himself and club doctors worked hard to minimize the pain he was able to play all games except one and a half. For the 2010 title-winning season he kept a clean sheet for 15 games.

Dahlin's injury problems continued into the 2011 season, and he missed the majority of Malmö's campaign, but returned to play in 12 league matches, and featured in the group stage of the 2011–12 UEFA Europa League. On 13 June 2012, Dahlin signed a new two-year contract until the end of the 2014 season. In the 2012 season Dahlin wasn't as affected by his back injury as in the previous season and played 29 out of 30 matches for Malmö FF, he missed one match due to racking up three yellow cards.

During the title-winning 2013 season, Dahlin played 22 matches out of 30. He missed some matches due to injury and was briefly replaced as first-choice goalkeeper by Robin Olsen after some solid performances by the latter. Dahlin kept seven clean sheets during the season. He also played all six matches for the club during its title-winning run in the qualifying stages of the 2013–14 UEFA Europa League. His performance throughout the season earned him a nomination for the goalkeeping first-choice award.

=== Gençlerbirliği ===
On 23 December 2013, Malmö FF confirmed Dahlin’s transfer to Süper Lig club Gençlerbirliği on a contract lasting until 2017. The move was finalised on 7 January when the Turkish transfer window opened.

== International career ==
Dahlin earned his first cap for the Sweden national team against the USA in January 2009. He was selected for Sweden's annual training camp in January 2012. The squad selection for the camp traditionally features the best Swedish players in domestic and other Scandinavian leagues.

== Career statistics ==
=== Club ===
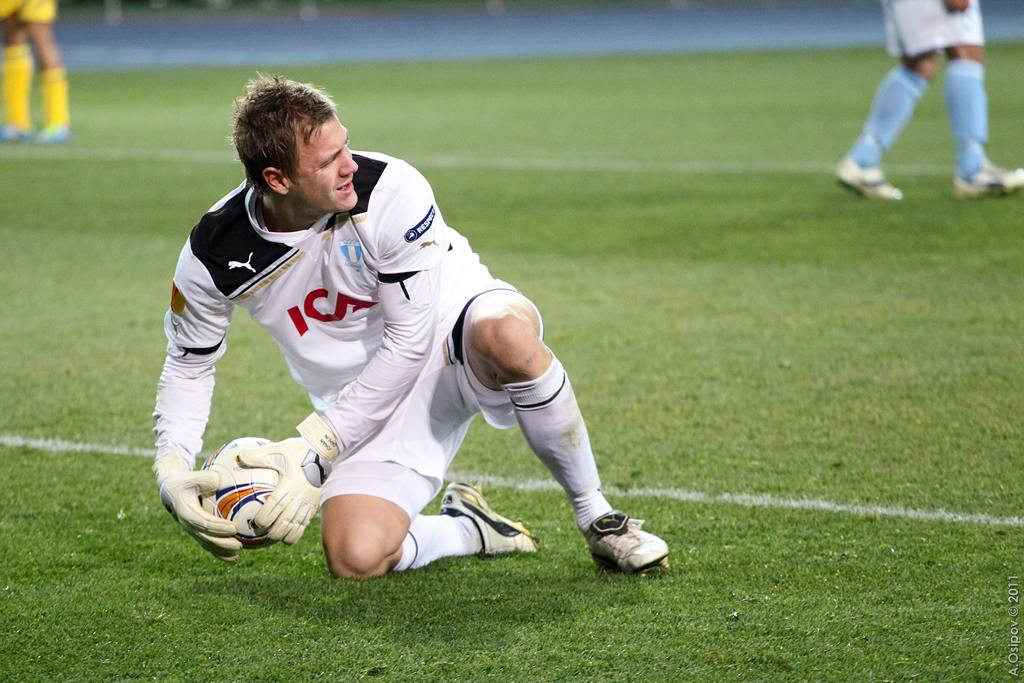
Dahlin playing for Malmö FF in 2011

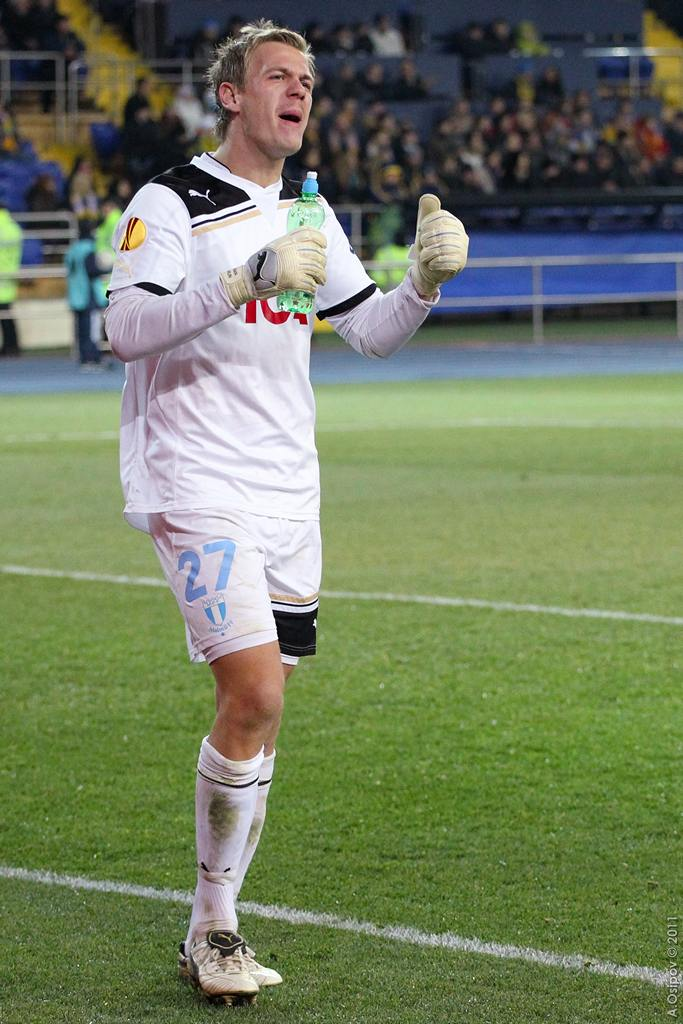
Dahlin playing for Malmö FF in 2011

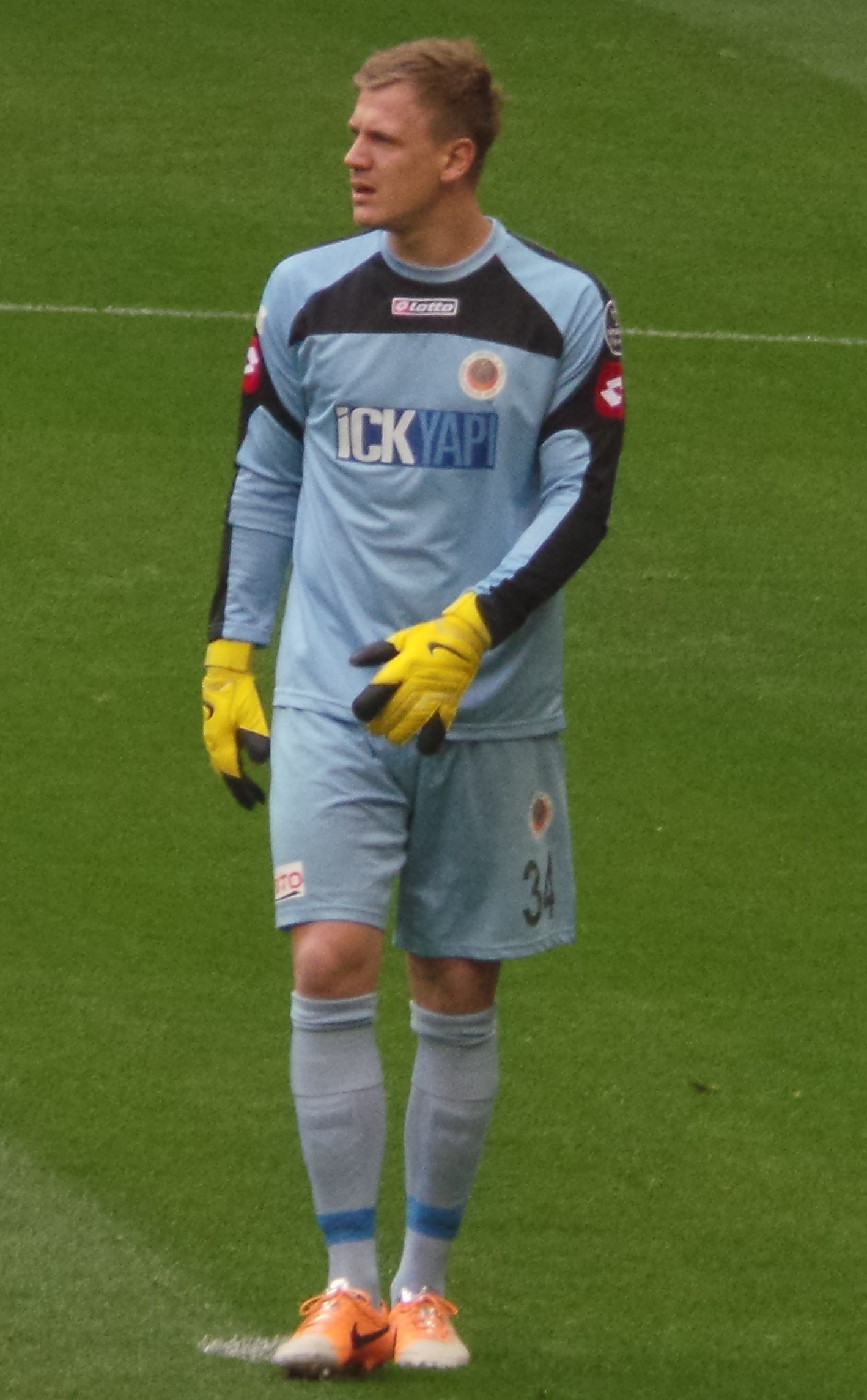
Dahlin playing for Gençlerbirliği in 2014

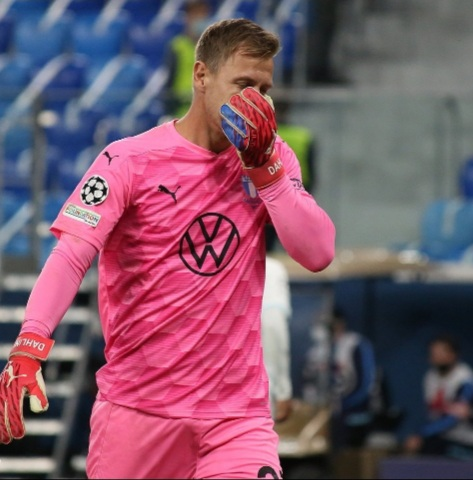
Dahlin playing for Malmö FF in 2021

As of 20 July 2026

Appearances and goals by club, season and competition
Club	Season	League			Cup		Continental		Total	
Club	Season	Division	Apps	Goals	Apps	Goals	Apps	Goals	Apps	Goals
FC Trollhättan	2003	Division 2	1	0	0	0	—		1	0
Åsebro IF	2004	Division 3	18	0	0	0	—		18	0
Lyn	2005	Tippeligaen	0	0	0	0	—		0	0
Lyn	2006	Tippeligaen	12	0	1	0	1	0	14	0
Lyn	2007	Tippeligaen	4	0	0	0	—		4	0
Lyn	2008	Tippeligaen	1	0	0	0	—		1	0
Lyn	2009	Tippeligaen	13	0	1	0	—		14	0
Lyn	Total		30	0	2	0	1	0	33	0
Trelleborgs FF (loan)	2008	Allsvenskan	14	0	0	0	—		14	0
Malmö FF	2009	Allsvenskan	12	0	0	0	—		12	0
Malmö FF	2010	Allsvenskan	29	0	1	0	—		30	0
Malmö FF	2011	Allsvenskan	12	0	0	0	6	0	18	0
Malmö FF	2012	Allsvenskan	29	0	0	0	—		29	0
Malmö FF	2013	Allsvenskan	22	0	3	0	6	0	31	0
Malmö FF	Total		104	0	4	0	12	0	120	0
Gençlerbirliği	2013–14	Süper Lig	10	0	0	0	—		10	0
Gençlerbirliği	2014–15	Süper Lig	10	0	0	0	—		10	0
Gençlerbirliği	Total		20	0	0	0	0	0	20	0
FC Midtjylland	2014–15	Danish Superliga	10	0	0	0	—		10	0
FC Midtjylland	2015–16	Danish Superliga	4	0	0	0	5	0	9	0
FC Midtjylland	2016–17	Danish Superliga	25	0	3	0	8	0	36	0
FC Midtjylland	Total		39	0	3	0	13	0	55	0
Malmö FF	2017	Allsvenskan	11	0	1	0	0	0	12	0
Malmö FF	2018	Allsvenskan	25	0	7	0	14	0	46	0
Malmö FF	2019	Allsvenskan	29	0	2	0	12	0	43	0
Malmö FF	2020	Allsvenskan	14	0	6	0	2	0	22	0
Malmö FF	2021	Allsvenskan	19	0	1	0	12	0	32	0
Malmö FF	2022	Allsvenskan	19	0	5	0	9	0	33	0
Malmö FF	2023	Allsvenskan	29	0	2	0	—		31	0
Malmö FF	2024	Allsvenskan	20	0	5	0	8	0	33	0
Malmö FF	2025	Allsvenskan	0	0	0	0	0	0	0	0
Malmö FF	2026	Allsvenskan	6	0	1	0	0	0	7	0
Malmö FF	Total		172	0	30	0	57	0	259	0
Career total			398	0	39	0	74	0	514	0

=== International ===
As of 5 March 2014

Appearances and goals by national team and year
National team	Year	Apps	Goals
Sweden	2009	1	0
Sweden	2010	1	0
Sweden	2011	0	0
Sweden	2012	1	0
Sweden	2013	0	0
Sweden	2014	1	0
Total		4	0

== Honours ==
Malmö FF

- Allsvenskan: 2010, 2013, 2017, 2020, 2021, 2023, 2024
- Svenska Cupen: 2021–22, 2023–24
- Svenska Supercupen: 2013
