= Paweł Cibicki =

Swedish footballer

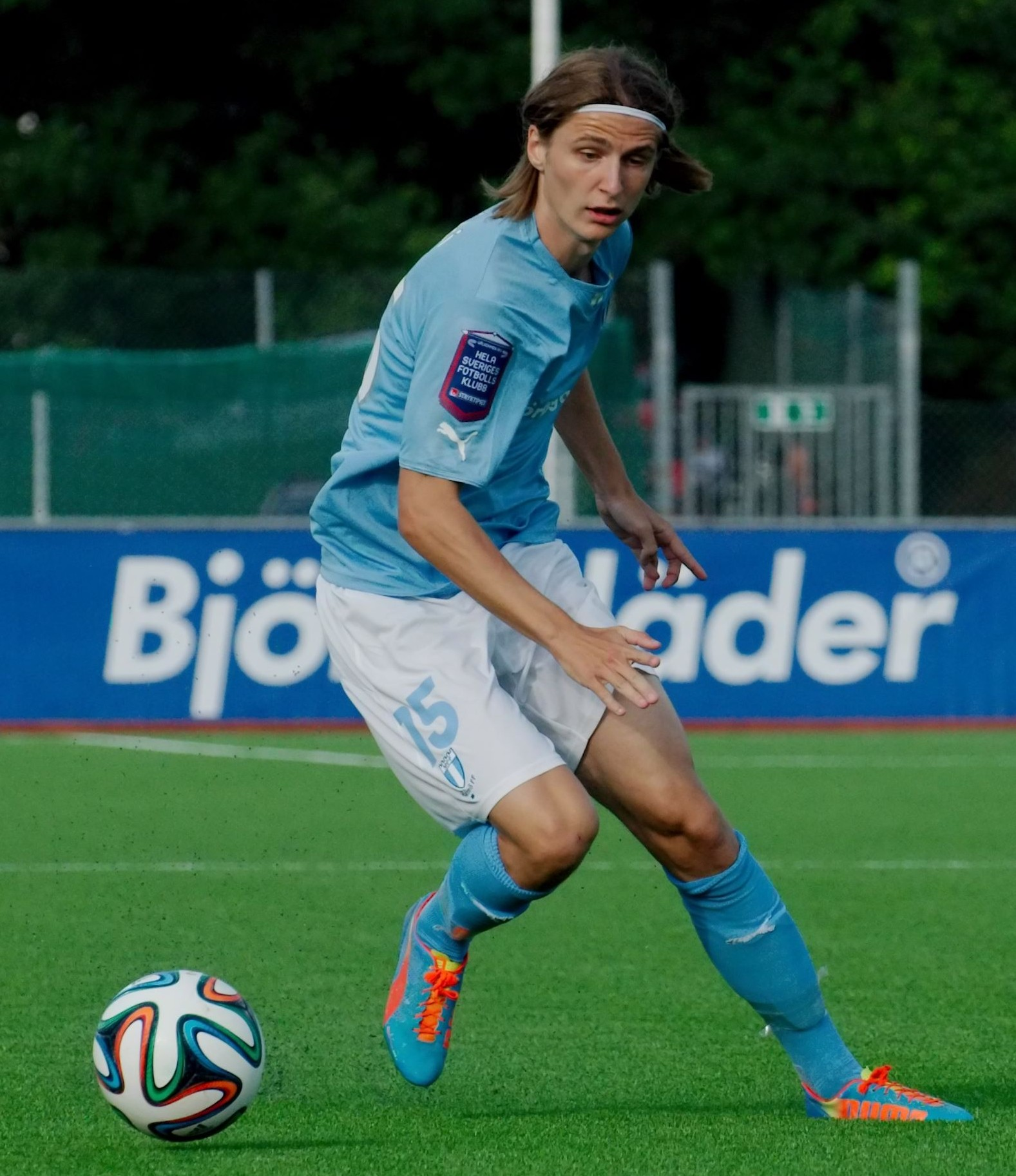

Personal information
- Full name: Paweł Cibicki
- Date of birth: 9 January 1994 (age 32)
- Place of birth: Malmö, Sweden
- Height: 1.82 m (6 ft 0 in)
- Positions: Striker; winger

Youth career
- 2000–2004: Nydala IF
- 2005: FC Malmö
- 2006–2013: Malmö FF

Senior career*
Years	Team	Apps	(Gls)
2013–2017	Malmö FF	57	(11)
2016	→ Jönköpings Södra (loan)	26	(10)
2017–2020	Leeds United	7	(0)
2018	→ Molde (loan)	13	(3)
2019	→ IF Elfsborg (loan)	14	(5)
2019–2020	→ ADO Den Haag (loan)	3	(0)
2020–2022	Pogoń Szczecin	18	(3)
2025	IFK Värnamo	12	(0)

International career
2013	Poland U19	1	(0)
2014	Poland U20	1	(0)
2016–2017	Sweden U21	10	(1)
- * Club domestic league appearances and goals as of 14:08, 6 November 2025 (UTC)

Paweł Cibicki (Polish pronunciation: [ˈpavɛw tɕiˈbitski]; born 9 January 1994) is a Swedish professional footballer. His preferred position is striker but he can also play as a winger. He was born in Malmö, Sweden to parents from Poland. He represented the Sweden U21 team at the 2017 UEFA European Under-21 Championship. In 2021 he was given a four-year suspension for match fixing.

== Club career ==
=== Malmö FF ===
On 23 November 2012, Cibicki signed a first-team contract on a youth basis with Malmö FF. Cibicki made his Allsvenskan debut for Malmö FF in a home fixture against Gefle IF on 7 July 2013. In total Cibicki played seven matches for the club during his first season, most of the matches coming on as a substitute for the attackers.

On 1 July 2014, Cibicki signed a first team contract with Malmö FF for three and a half additional years at the club. Previously in the summer of 2014 Cibicki had reached a verbal agreement with Dutch Eredivisie club FC Groningen, but he decided to stay at Malmö FF the day before the deal was about to be signed. Overall the 2014 season proved to be a breakthrough for Cibicki as he made 21 appearances for the club, scoring twice. His first league goal was scored against Halmstads BK at home on 12 May 2014 in a 3–1 victory. Cibicki also made three appearances in the group stage of the 2014–15 UEFA Champions League, registering one assist in Malmö's 2–0 win over Olympiacos.

During the 2016 season, Cibicki was loaned to Jönköpings Södra IF where he scored 10 goals in 26 matches and contributed to Jönköpings remaining in Allsvenskan. While out on loan, in October 2016, he extended his contract with Malmö FF until the 2019 season and before the 2017 season he returned to Malmö, playing 20 times during the 2017 season, scoring five goals.

=== Leeds United ===
On 31 August, Leeds confirmed the signing of Cibicki on a four-year deal for an undisclosed fee (rumoured to be in the region of £1.5 million plus add-ons). He made his debut for Leeds just over two weeks later on 19 September in the League Cup third round tie against Premier League side Burnley which Leeds won in a penalty shootout after a 2–2 draw.

On 9 December, Cibicki made his league debut for the Whites against QPR at Loftus Road. Coming on as a substitute for the injured Caleb Ekuban, he marked his debut with an impressive display and provided an assist for Kemar Roofe to score his second goal of the match, Roofe eventually going on to score a hat-trick in Leeds' 3–1 win. Cibicki's second league appearance, a week later, saw another assist by the Swede from a free kick, which his former Malmö teammate Pontus Jansson converted, for a 1–0 win over Norwich.

==== Loan to Molde FK ====
On 3 July 2018, Cibicki joined Norwegian Eliteserien side Molde FK on loan until 31 December 2018, after being signed by Manager Ole Gunnar Solskjaer.

He made his competitive debut for Molde on 26 July 2018, starting in the UEFA Europa League 3–0 home victory against KF Laçi. On 5 August 2018 he made his league debut, starting away to Lillestrøm in a game ending 2–2. On 12 August 2018, Cibicki got his first goal for Molde, scoring the club's second goal before setting up the third, in a 5–1 win over league leaders Brann. In total he made 18 appearances for Molde, with 5 of those coming in the UEFA Europa League, before returning to Leeds at the end of his loan spell on 31 December 2018.

==== Loan to IF Elfsborg ====
On 11 January 2019, he joined IF Elfsborg on a 6-month loan with the option to buy. He scored his 1st goal for the club on 14 April in a 3–1 win over GIF Sundsvall, he started the season with 4 goals in his first 6 games for the club.

==== Loan to ADO Den Haag ====
On 21 August 2019, he joined ADO Den Haag on a season-long loan deal.

=== Pogoń Szczecin ===
On 12 January 2020, Cibicki's loan to ADO Den Haag from Leeds United was cut short so he could complete a move to Polish Ekstraklasa side Pogoń Szczecin.

== International career ==
Cibicki holds dual passports, from his country of birth, Sweden, and his parents' birth country Poland. In March 2013 he was called up by the Poland national under-19 team for two friendlies against Georgia. He played for 24 minutes after coming on as a substitute in the 3–1 win against Georgia in the first of two friendlies. In August 2016 he was called up to both Poland U21 and Sweden U21. Cibicki chose to play for his country of birth, Sweden.

In June 2017, he played all three games for Sweden U21 in the 2017 UEFA European Under-21 Championship held at his parents' Poland. As he is yet to be called up to the Sweden senior team, he remains eligible to represent Poland.

== Criminal proceedings ==
=== Match fixing ===
In June 2019, suspicion about a match fixing event in a game between Allsvenskan team IF Elfsborg and Kalmar FF was announced, The identity of the player was however not revealed. Later the same month, the Swedish police and the Swedish prosecutor's office announced they would launch an investigation on the matter. In December 2020, the prosecutor's office announced that they would prosecute the player, along with three others from other match fixing incidents, and it was revealed that the case evolved around the player receiving money, in form of a loan, after the match from a person who had betted on the player receiving a yellow card in the match, which the player ended up receiving in the 60th minute of the match, it was also revealed that the player in question was Cibicki.

On 7 June 2021, it was announced that the district court acquitted Cibicki on all accusations, However, the decision was appealed to the court of appeal, in September the Swedish Football Association decided to ban Cibicki from football for four years, and in December 2021, the Scania and Blekinge Court of Appeal went on the prosecutor's side and convicted Cibicki of taking bribes, but sentenced him to only probation.

Prior to receiving the sentence, Cibicki appeared on the podcast Heltidsproffs (Full-time professional) and told his side of the story, about how he had struggled with a gambling addiction since the age of 18 and had gambled away millions of Swedish kronor and that he because of it had struggled with suicidal thoughts.

Following the sentencing, Cibicki appealed the verdict to the Supreme Court of Sweden, while FIFA at the same time announced that they sided with the Swedish FA and banned Cibicki from football on a global scale for four years. Cibicki tried to have the Supreme Sports Tribunal, the supreme court of sports in Sweden, revoke the Swedish FA's ban, but on 9 March 2022 the application was rejected.

On 14 March, the Swedish Supreme Court announced that they would not try Cibicki's appeal, hence the convicting ruling of the court of appeal would remain.

=== Money laundering ===
In September 2025, it was reported that an old couple had lost 900,000 kronor to scammers, out which 175,000 kronor was reported to have been moved to two bank accounts belonging to an active player in Allsvenskan, it was later revealed that the player was Cibicki and his club IFK Värnamo decided to pause him from all activities with the club.

On 16 October, Värnamo announced that they would cancel Cibicki's contract on the player's own request.

== Career statistics ==
As of match played 19 September 2020

Appearances and goals by club, season and competition
Club	Season	League			National cup (Note: Includes Svenska Cupen, FA Cup, KNVB Cup, Polish Cup)		League cup (Note: Includes EFL Cup)		Continental		Total	
Club	Season	Division	Apps	Goals	Apps	Goals	Apps	Goals	Apps	Goals	Apps	Goals
Malmö FF	2013	Allsvenskan	7	0	3	1	—		4 (Note: Appearances in UEFA Europa League)	0	14	1
Malmö FF	2014	Allsvenskan	21	3	3	0	—		7 (Note: Appearance(s) in UEFA Champions League)	0	31	3
Malmö FF	2015	Allsvenskan	9	3	4	0	—		1	0	14	3
Malmö FF	2017	Allsvenskan	20	5	1	0	—		1	0	22	5
Malmö FF	Total		57	11	11	1	—		13	0	81	12
Jönköpings Södra IF (loan)	2016	Allsvenskan	26	10	3	0	—		—		29	10
Leeds United	2017–18	Championship	7	0	1	0	2	0	—		10	0
Molde (loan)	2018	Eliteserien	13	3	0	0	—		5	0	18	3
IF Elfsborg (loan)	2019	Allsvenskan	14	5	0	0	—		0	0	14	5
ADO Den Haag (loan)	2019–20	Eredivisie	3	0	1	0	—		—		4	0
Pogoń Szczecin	2020–21	Ekstraklasa	14	3	—		—		—		14	3
Pogoń Szczecin	2021–22	Ekstraklasa	4	0	1	0	—		—		5	0
Pogoń Szczecin	Total		18	3	1	0	—		—		19	3
Career total			138	32	17	1	2	0	18	0	175	33

== Honours ==
Malmö FF

- Allsvenskan: 2013, 2014, 2017
- Svenska Supercupen: 2013, 2014
