= Simon Thern =

Swedish footballer (born 1992)

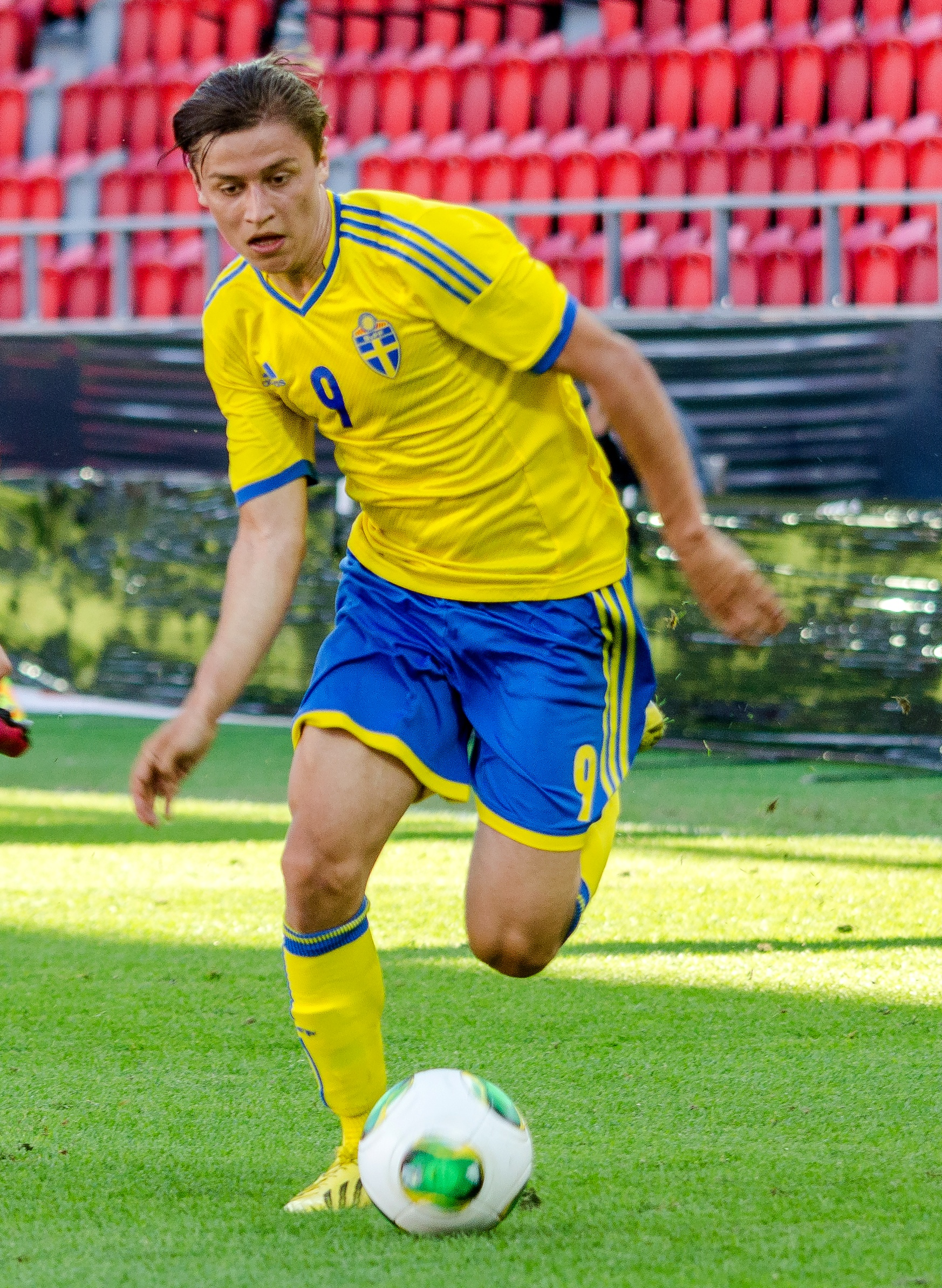
- Thern playing for Sweden U21 in 2013

Personal information
- Full name: Johan Simon Thern
- Date of birth: 18 September 1992 (age 34)
- Place of birth: Värnamo, Sweden
- Height: 1.76 m (5 ft 9 in)
- Position: Midfielder

Team information
- Current team: IFK Värnamo
- Number: 22

Youth career
- –2010: IFK Värnamo

Senior career*
Years	Team	Apps	(Gls)
2008–2010	IFK Värnamo	26	(0)
2010–2011	Helsingborgs IF	23	(2)
2010	→ IFK Värnamo (loan)	21	(8)
2012–2014	Malmö FF	71	(9)
2015–2017	Heerenveen	34	(7)
2017	→ AIK (loan)	24	(1)
2018–2020	IFK Norrköping	74	(9)
2021–2023	IFK Göteborg	41	(3)
2023–	IFK Värnamo	81	(6)

International career
2009	Sweden U17	2	(0)
2010	Sweden U19	3	(0)
2011–2013	Sweden U21	9	(1)
2012–2019	Sweden	4	(2)
- * Club domestic league appearances and goals as of 12 November 2026

Johan Simon Thern (born 18 September 1992) is a Swedish professional footballer who plays as a midfielder for the Superettan club IFK Värnamo. Starting off his career with IFK Värnamo in 2008, he went on to represent Helsingborgs IF, Malmö FF, Heerenveen, AIK, IFK Norrköping, and IFK Göteborg before returning to IFK Värnamo in 2023. A full international since 2012, he has won four caps and scored two goals for the Sweden national team.

== Club career ==
=== Early career ===
Thern started his professional career in IFK Värnamo. He was soon signed by Allsvenskan club Helsingborgs IF but was immediately loaned to Värnamo for the entire 2010 season. Thern made his Allsvenskan debut for Helsingborg in the home fixture against Syrianska FC on 22 April 2011. He made his debut in the starting eleven against Djurgårdens IF away on 4 July 2011. In total Thern played 23 matches and scored two goals in his debut season in Helsingborg who won a treble for the 2011 season. On 7 December 2011 Helsingborg announced that Thern had rejected a contract offer from the club and would leave when his contract runs out on 28 March 2012, several media has reported that Thern has signed a contract with Helsingborgs arch rivals Malmö FF.

=== Malmö FF ===
On 23 December 2011, Malmö FF confirmed that Thern had signed a three-year deal with the club. This was following an agreement with Helsingborg to terminate Thern's contract early, so he could join his new club for pre-season. He made his first competitive appearance for the club as a starter in the season opening game against Gefle on 2 April. Thern received more playing time than expected as he was used both in the central midfield but also on the left wing when needed. This was mainly due to the transfer of Jimmy Durmaz who played as left winger in the first half of the 2012 season and the fact that the competition for the starting spots in the central midfield much higher. Thern played 28 matches and scored three goals for Malmö FF in the league for the 2012 season.

For the league title winning 2013 season Thern played 29 matches and scored four goals. He also played five matches for the club in its participation for the qualifying stages of the 2013–14 UEFA Europa League. Thern became the first player to win the league with both rival Helsingborgs IF and Malmö FF. During the season he scored against his former club for the first time in a 1–1 tie at Swedbank Stadion on 29 May 2013. During Malmö FF's 2014 league winning season Thern made 14 league appearances, missing parts of the season due to a broken bone. Thern recovered during the latter part of the season to be available to play in three fixtures in the group stage of the 2014–15 UEFA Champions League.

=== Heerenveen ===
On 12 December 2014 it was announced that Thern would transfer to Dutch club Heerenveen. The transfer went through when the Dutch transfer window opened on 5 January 2015. He made his debut on 18 January 2015 in the home game against Utrecht (2-1 win).

=== IFK Norrköping ===
Thern signed for IFK Norrköping on 15 January 2018.

=== IFK Göteborg ===
On 22 February 2021, it was announced that Thern had signed for IFK Göteborg.

== International career ==
=== Youth ===
Thern made his debut for Sweden U21 on 10 August 2011 in a 3–0 win against Netherlands U21.

=== Senior ===
Thern was selected for the annual training camp for the Sweden national team in January 2012 after Malmö teammates Mathias Ranégie and Ivo Pękalski had to withdraw from the squad. The squad selection for the camp traditionally feature the best Swedish players in domestic and other Scandinavian leagues. Thern was selected for the training camp once again in 2013 where he played in the first match of the 2013 King's Cup against North Korea.

== Personal life ==
Simon Thern is the son of Jonas Thern who had a very successful career as a professional football player in clubs such as Malmö FF, Benfica, Napoli, Roma and Rangers. Jonas Thern also played 75 matches and scored six goals for Sweden. Both Jonas and Simon started their careers in IFK Värnamo before moving on to Allsvenskan.

== Controversy ==
In the Scanian derby between Malmö FF and Helsingborgs IF on 24 September 2012 at Olympia in Helsingborg, a group of Helsingborg supporters unfurled a banner reading "Simon Thern skall dö" (Simon Thern shall die) along with an effigy of Thern hung from a noose. Officials allowed the game to continue. Thern had previously played for Helsingborg before moving to their rivals Malmö FF in early 2012.

== Career statistics ==
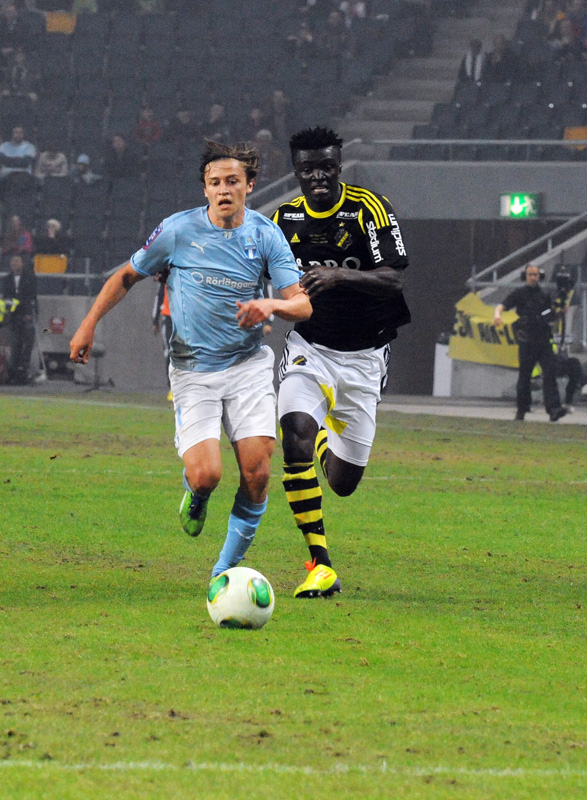
Thern playing for Malmö FF against AIK

=== Club ===
Updated 29 January 2018

Club	Season	League			Cup		Continental		Total	
Club	Season	Division	Apps	Goals	Apps	Goals	Apps	Goals	Apps	Goals
IFK Värnamo	2008	Division 1 Södra	7	0	0	0	—		7	0
IFK Värnamo	2009	Division 1 Södra	19	0	0	0	—		19	0
IFK Värnamo	2010	Division 1 Södra	21	8	0	0	—		21	8
IFK Värnamo	Total		47	8	0	0	—		47	8
Helsingborgs IF	2011	Allsvenskan	23	2	4	1	4	0	31	3
Helsingborgs IF	Total		23	2	4	1	4	0	31	3
Malmö FF	2012	Allsvenskan	28	3	1	0	—		29	3
Malmö FF	2013	Allsvenskan	29	4	2 (Note: One Appearance in Svenska Supercupen)	0	5	0	36	4
Malmö FF	2014	Allsvenskan	14	2	6	0	3	0	23	2
Malmö FF	Total		71	9	9	0	8	0	88	9
Heerenveen	2014–15	Eredivisie	18	4	0	0	—		18	4
Heerenveen	2015–16	Eredivisie	14	3	2	0	0	0	16	3
Heerenveen	2016–17	Eredivisie	4	0	2	0	—		6	0
Heerenveen	Total		34	7	4	0	0	0	38	7
AIK (loan)	2017	Allsvenskan	24	1	4	0	3	0	31	1
AIK (loan)	Total		24	1	4	0	3	0	31	1
Career total			197	27	21	1	15	0	237	28

=== International ===
Updated 11 January 2019

Appearances and goals by national team and year

National team	Year	Apps	Goals
Sweden	2012	1	1
Sweden	2013	1	0
Sweden	2014	0	0
Sweden	2015	0	0
Sweden	2016	0	0
Sweden	2017	0	0
Sweden	2018	0	0
Sweden	2019	2	1
Total		4	2

International goals

Scores and results list Sweden's goal tally first.

No.	Date	Venue	Opponent	Score	Result	Competition
1.	23 January 2012	Jassim Bin Hamad Stadium, Doha, Qatar	Qatar	4–0	5–0	Friendly
2.	11 January 2019	Khalifa International Stadium, Doha, Qatar	Iceland	2–1	2–2	Friendly

== Honours ==
Helsingborgs IF

- Allsvenskan: 2011
- Svenska Cupen: 2011
- Svenska Supercupen: 2011

Malmö FF

- Allsvenskan: 2013, 2014
- Svenska Supercupen: 2013, 2014
