= Johan Hammar =

Swedish footballer (born 1994)

Personal information
- Full name: Per Johan Gustav Hammar
- Date of birth: 22 February 1994 (age 32)
- Place of birth: Malmö, Sweden
- Height: 6 ft 5 in (1.96 m)
- Position: Centre-back

Team information
- Current team: BK Häcken
- Number: 3

Youth career
- –2004: Bunkeflo IF
- 2004–2010: Malmö FF
- 2010–2013: Everton

Senior career*
Years	Team	Apps	(Gls)
2013	Everton	0	(0)
2013	→ Stockport County (loan)	6	(0)
2013–2015	Malmö FF	8	(0)
2015	→ Fredrikstad FK (loan)	23	(1)
2016–2017	Örgryte IS	58	(4)
2018–	BK Häcken	134	(6)

International career
2009	Sweden U17	1	(0)
2012–2013	Sweden U19	13	(1)
- * Club domestic league appearances and goals as of 08:42, 29 May 2026 (UTC)

Per Johan Gustav Hammar (born 22 February 1994) is a Swedish professional footballer who plays as a centre-back for BK Häcken.

== Club career ==
=== Everton ===
Born in Malmö, Sweden, Hammar played in both youth clubs in Sweden at Bunkeflo IF and Malmö FF before joining Premier League side Everton from Malmö in July 2010, signing a full-time scholarship with the club. In February 2011, Hammar signed his first professional contract with the club. After spending a year playing in the academy, Hammar made his Everton U21 debut, playing the whole game, in a 4–2 win over Blackburn Rovers on 16 January 2012.

In the 2012–13 season, Hammar began to play for the club's reserve regularly under the Reserve Manager Alan Stubbs. Hammar went on to make eight appearances for the side, including scoring his first goal, as well as, an own goal, in a 5–1 loss against West Ham U21 on 26 August 2012.

==== Loan to Stockport County ====
On 11 February 2013, Hammar joined Stockport County on a one-month loan. He made his debut on 16 February 2013, in Stockport's 0–0 draw with Ebbsfleet United. He made a total of six appearances for the club before returning to Everton.

==== Departure ====
At the end of the 2012–13 season, without making any first-team appearances, Hammar was released by Everton on 7 June 2013.

=== Malmö FF ===
On 18 June 2013, Hammar signed a six months contract with his youth club Malmö FF, where he will join the club on 1 July 2013. Prior to his move to Malmö FF, Hammar was linked with a move to Italian clubs before joining them in favour of his hometown club instead.

Hammar made his debut for the club in the Scanian derby against Helsingborgs IF away at Olympia on 25 September 2013. On 9 December 2013, Hammar signed a new three-year contract with the club.

In his first full season at the club, Hammar found his first team opportunities limited, as centre-backs Filip Helander and Erik Johansson were preferred instead. As a result, Hammar regularly played for the reserve side for the rest of the season instead. But following Johansson's injury, Hammar was given a handful of first team appearances throughout July until his return from injury. As the season progressed, Hammar appeared in the first team, playing on three occasions, but was sent-off in the last game of the season, in a 2–1 loss against Åtvidaberg. At the end of the season, he made seven league appearances for the club and participated in three qualifying matches for the 2014–15 UEFA Champions League.

==== Loan to Fredrikstad ====
With his first-team opportunities limited at Malmö, Hammar moved to Norwegian side Fredrikstad on loan for the rest of the season. Hammar made his Fredrikstad debut, in the opening game of the season, in a 1–1 draw against Brann. In the next game against Hødd, Hammar provided an assist to set up one of the goals, in a 2–2 draw and scoring his first goal for the club on 23 April 2015, in a 5–1 win over As IL. Hammar then scored his first league goal for the club on 25 May 2015, in a 2–2 draw against Follo. After suffering from an injury, Hammar went on to make 25 appearances and scoring two times in all competitions. At the end of the season, he returned to his parent club.

=== Örgryte IS ===
Following his loan spell at Fredrikstad came to an end, Hammar left Malmö FF, to join Örgryte IS, signing a two-year contract.

Hammar played his first game in the Superettan on 3 April 2016 against Ljungskile, which resulted in a 1–1 draw, in the opening game of the season. On 23 July 2016, he scored his first goal, in a 3–2 win over Degerfors A month later on 26 August 2016, Hammar scored the winning goal in extra time, in a 2–1 win over BK Höllviken in the second round of the Svenska Cupen. In his first season at the club, Hammar established himself in the starting-eleven and went on to make twenty-eight appearances and scoring once in all competitions. Hammar missed two matches, due to special leave and suspension.

Ahead of the 2017 season, Hammar was linked with a move away from Örgryte IS, with top clubs in Sweden keen on signing him. Despite the transfer speculation, Hammar was named captain of Örgryte IS ahead of the 2017 season In the 2017 season, Hammar scored the first goal for Örgryte IS, after just three minutes in their first game of the Superettan season, in a 2–1 win over Varbergs BoIS. He then continued to established himself in the first team for the side, as well as, being captain, throughout the season. Later on in the season, Hammar also scored against Östers IF and Gefle IF. Despite missing two matches later in the season, Hammer went on to make 33 appearances and scoring 3 times in all competitions.

At the end of the 2017 season, Hammar decided not to renew his contract at Örgryte IS and signed a contract at Allsvenskan club BK Häcken instead.

=== BK Häcken ===
Hammar joined BK Häcken in November 2017, signing a one-year contract with an option for another three years.

On 12 August 2018, he scored his first goal for BK Häcken and his first in the Allsvenskan.

== International career ==
After playing once for Sweden U17, Hammar has made several appearances for Sweden U19s. Hammar then made an impressive display against Finland U19 that saw earned Man of the Match on 15 August 2012 and scored his first Sweden U19 goal on 10 October 2012, in a 3–1 win over Wales U19. Hammar went on to make thirteen appearances and scoring once for Sweden U19 side.

== Career statistics ==
As of 14 November 2018

Appearances and goals by club, season and competition
Club	Season	League			Cup		Continental		Total	
Club	Season	Division	Apps	Goals	Apps	Goals	Apps	Goals	Apps	Goals
Stockport County (loan)	2012–13	Football Conference	6	0	0	0	—		6	0
Malmö FF	2013	Allsvenskan	1	0	0	0	0	0	1	0
Malmö FF	2014	Allsvenskan	7	0	1	0	3	0	11	0
Malmö FF	Total		8	0	1	0	3	0	12	0
Fredrikstad (loan)	2015	Norwegian First Division	23	1	2	1	—		25	2
Örgryte IS	2016	Superettan	28	1	1	1	—	—	29	2
Örgryte IS	2017	Superettan	30	3	4	0	—	—	34	3
Örgryte IS	Total		58	4	5	1	0	0	63	5
BK Häcken	2018	Allsvenskan	15	1	1	0	4	0	20	1
Career total			110	6	9	2	7	0	126	8

== Honours ==
Malmö FF

- Allsvenskan: 2014
- Svenska Supercupen: 2013, 2014

BK Häcken

- Allsvenskan: 2022
- Svenska Cupen: 2022–23
