= Simon Kroon =

Swedish footballer

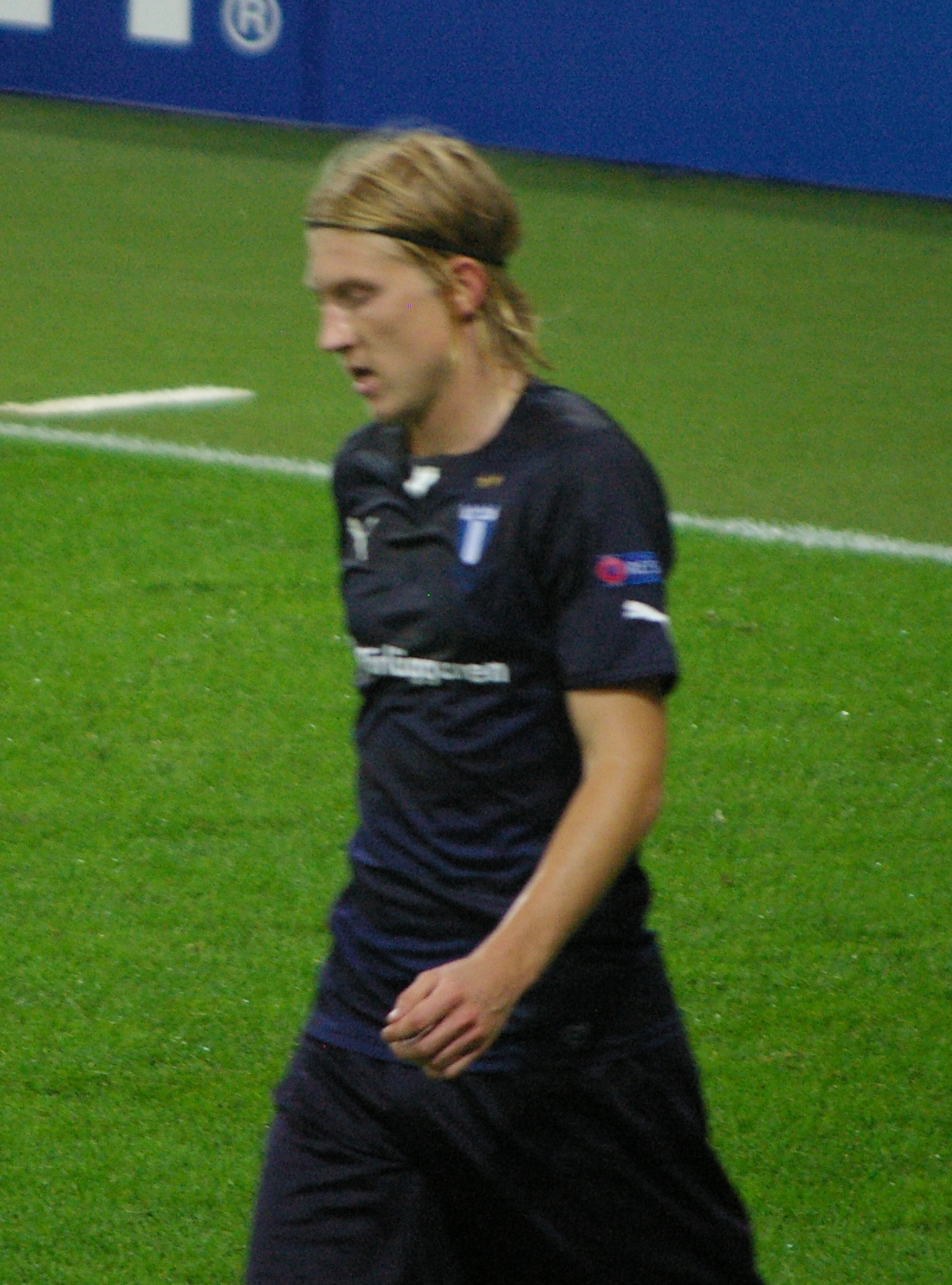

Personal information
- Full name: Simon Robert Kroon
- Date of birth: 16 June 1993 (age 33)
- Place of birth: Sweden
- Height: 1.80 m (5 ft 11 in)
- Position: Winger

Team information
- Current team: Östersunds FK
- Number: 21

Youth career
- –2005: Limhamns IF
- 2005–2011: Malmö FF

Senior career*
Years	Team	Apps	(Gls)
2011–2015	Malmö FF	51	(3)
2016–2017	SønderjyskE	29	(6)
2017–2018	FC Midtjylland	11	(1)
2018	→ SønderjyskE (loan)	15	(1)
2018–	Östersunds FK	76	(10)

International career
2011	Sweden U19	5	(0)
2013–2014	Sweden U21	6	(0)
- * Club domestic league appearances and goals as of 15 November 2024

Simon Robert Kroon (born 16 June 1993) is a Swedish footballer who plays for Östersunds FK in Superettan. He is the son of the former athletes Johnny Kroon and Annika Lorentzon.

== Club career ==
Kroon made his Allsvenskan debut in a match against Kalmar FF on 20 June 2011. Seven days later he made his debut in the starting eleven in a match against GAIS at Gamla Ullevi. On 28 March 2013 Kroon signed a first team contract with Malmö FF until the end of the 2015 season. A few weeks later he scored his first league goal for Malmö FF in the home fixture against Östers IF to seal a 2–0 win for Malmö.

After having played 8 matches in his debut season at the club and then just one match during the 2012 season, Kroon was given a fair amount of playing time during the league title winning 2013 season. Although most his appearances was from the bench, Kroon played in 17 matches and scored 2 goals in the league. He also played in four matches and scored two goals for the club during qualification for the 2013–14 UEFA Europa League. In the 2014 season Kroon continued to make regular appearances for the club. In the group stage for the 2013–14 Svenska Cupen he scored five goals in three matches. He also scored for the club in the final fixture of the group stage of the 2014–15 UEFA Champions League, an away loss 4–2 to Olympiacos on 9 December 2014.

== Career statistics ==
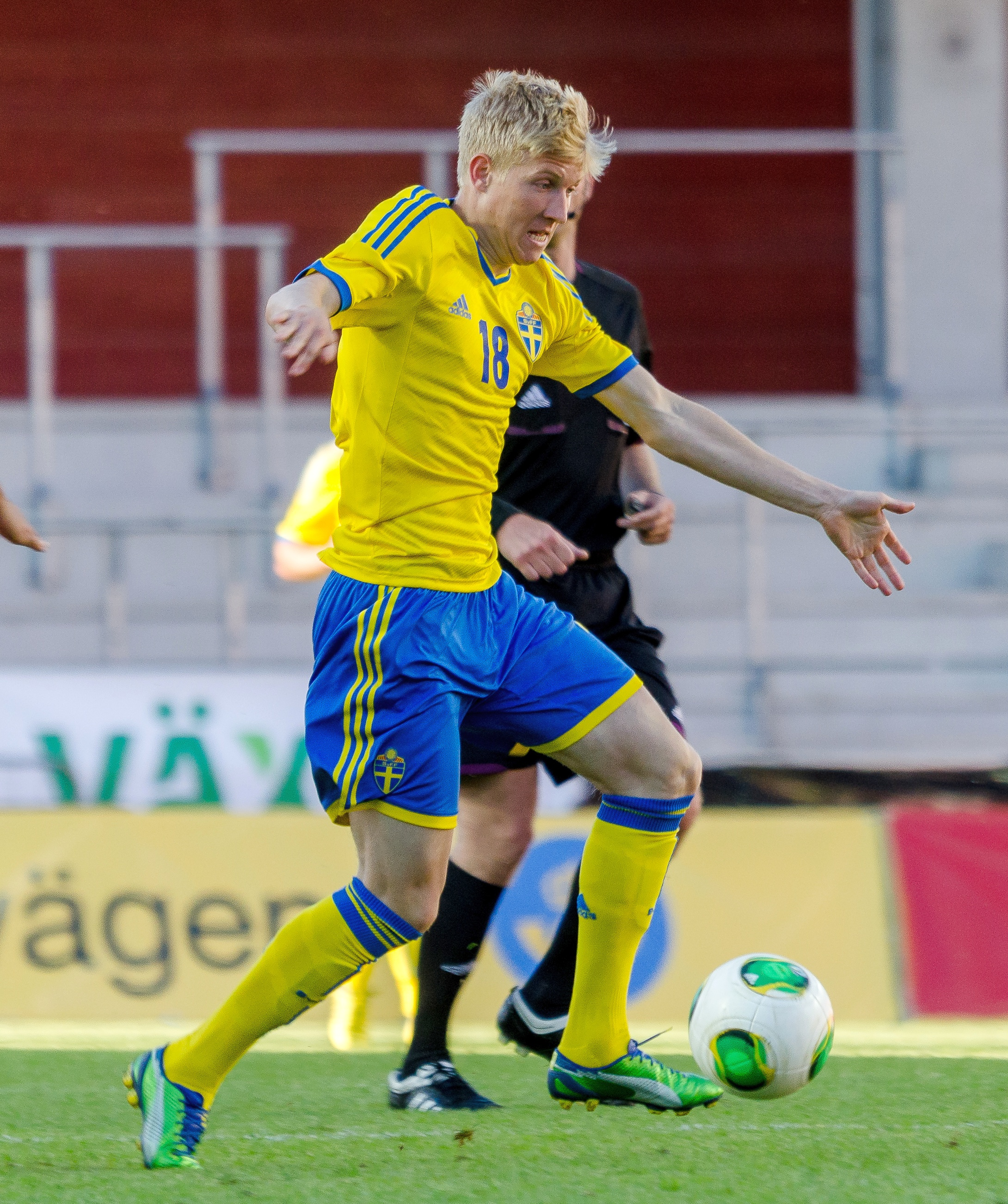
Kroon playing for Sweden U21 in 2013.

As of 21 July 2018.

Club	Season	League			Cup		Continental		Total	
Club	Season	Division	Apps	Goals	Apps	Goals	Apps	Goals	Apps	Goals
Malmö FF	2011	Allsvenskan	8	0	0	0	0	0	8	0
Malmö FF	2012	Allsvenskan	1	0	0	0	—		1	0
Malmö FF	2013	Allsvenskan	17	2	4	1	4	2	25	5
Malmö FF	2014	Allsvenskan	19	0	5	6	9	1	33	7
Malmö FF	2015	Allsvenskan	6	1	3	1	3	0	12	2
SønderjyskE	2015–16	Danish Superliga	15	2	1	0	0	0	16	2
SønderjyskE	2016–17	Danish Superliga	14	4	1	1	6	1	21	6
FC Midtjylland	2016–17	Danish Superliga	5	0	0	0	0	0	5	0
FC Midtjylland	2017–18	Danish Superliga	6	0	0	0	5	2	11	2
SønderjyskE	2017–18	Danish Superliga	15	1	0	0	0	0	15	1
FC Midtjylland	2018–19	Danish Superliga	0	0	0	0	0	0	0	0
Career total			106	11	16	9	27	6	149	26

== Honours ==
Malmö FF

- Allsvenskan: 2013, 2014
- Svenska Supercupen: 2013, 2014
