= 2013 Svenska Supercupen =

- Event: Svenska Supercupen
Malmö FF	IFK Göteborg
3	2
- Date: 10 November 2013
- Venue: Swedbank Stadion, Malmö
- Referee: Andreas Ekberg (Lund)
- Attendance: 2,787
- Weather: Rainy; 6 °C (43 °F); 91% humidity

2013 Svenska Supercupen (Swedish Super Cup 2013) was the 7th edition Svenska Supercupen annual football match that 2013 Allsvenskan champions Malmö FF successfully achieve its first Supercupen title defeating the 2013 Svenska Cupen champions IFK Göteborg, 3-2. This marked the first time that Malmö FF won Svenska Supercupen.This match was the first time that the cup was held after the end of the standard league season. The match was staged on 10 November 2013 at Swedbank Stadion, Malmö; the second time it hosted. This was the first match the two teams faced each other in Supercupen's existence: IFK Göteborg's fourth Supercupen appearance and Malmö FF's second Supercupen appearance.

In Sweden the match was broadcast live on TV4 Sport. Andreas Ekberg from Lund was the referee for the match, his first time officiating the competition. Malmö FF won the match after two goals from Emil Forsberg and a late winner by Guillermo Molins. Malmö FF took the lead twice during the course of the game before scoring the winning goal in injury time in the second half.

== Background ==
In 2012, Svenska Cupen changed to a fall-spring season format due to developing competition results. The title went unawarded after Helsingborgs' 2011 achievement. Had the cup format not changed, 2012 Allsvenskan champions IF Elfsborg would have met the 2012 cup champions in the 2013 edition of Svenska Supercupen, normally held in March before the start of Allsvenskan. Instead the Swedish Football Association announced that the 2013 Svenska Supercupen would be contested by the winners of 2013 Allsvenskan and the winners of 2012–13 Svenska Cupen in November 2013 after the conclusion of the league season. IFK Göteborg won the 2012–13 Svenska Cupen on 26 May 2013 and thus qualified for the 2013 Supercupen.

Since IFK Göteborg were in the running for the 2013 Allsvenskan title with three other teams, there was a possibility that their opponent in this match would be the runners-up of Allsvenskan if IFK Göteborg had won the league title. IFK Göteborg's title contenders were Malmö FF, Helsingborgs IF and AIK, all of which had competed in Supercupen previously. The league ended on 3 November 2013 although IFK Göteborg's opponent was confirmed on 28 October 2013 when Malmö FF secured the league title. As league winners, Malmö FF had home ground advantage in Supercupen. The two Allsvenskan matches in 2013 between Malmö FF and IFK Göteborg had ended in a 1–1 tie in Gothenburg in April and a 3–1 for Malmö FF in Malmö in August. This was the first time since 2001 that the two clubs met in a domestic cup match and the first time since 1986 that they met in a cup final.

== Match facts ==
10 November 2013
18:00 UTC+1

Malmö FF	3–2	IFK Göteborg
Forsberg 42', 48'; Molins 90'	Report	Haglund 45'; Vibe 55'

Swedbank Stadion, Malmö
Attendance: 2,787
Referee: Andreas Ekberg (Lund)

Malmö FF	IFK Göteborg

MALMÖ FF:
GK	27	(Sweden) Johan Dahlin
RB	3	(Sweden) Miiko Albornoz
CB	5	(Sweden) Pontus Jansson
CB	21	(Sweden) Erik Johansson
LB	20	(Brazil) Ricardinho
RM	10	(Sweden) Jiloan Hamad (c)	(yellow card) 89'
CM	11	(Sweden) Simon Thern		(substituted off) 86'
CM	6	(Finland) Markus Halsti
LM	33	(Sweden) Emil Forsberg		(substituted off) 75'
FW	24	(Sweden) Guillermo Molins
FW	7	(Sweden) Magnus Eriksson
Substitutes:
DF	2	(Sweden) Matias Concha
MF	8	(Sweden) Erik Friberg		(substituted in) 75'
FW	9	(Sweden) Dardan Rexhepi
MF	14	(Sweden) Simon Kroon		(substituted in) 86'
DF	18	(Sweden) Johan Hammar
GK	25	(Denmark) Robin Olsen
FW	35	(Poland) Pawel Cibicki
Manager:
(Sweden) Rikard Norling

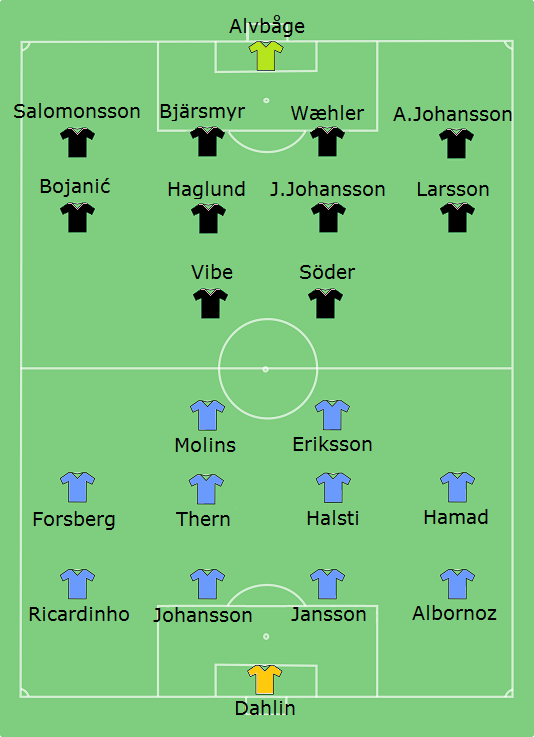

IFK GÖTEBORG:
GK	1	(Sweden) John Alvbåge	(yellow card) 48'
RB	2	(Sweden) Emil Salomonsson		(substituted off) 90+3'
CB	30	(Sweden) Mattias Bjärsmyr (c)
CB	4	(Norway) Kjetil Wæhler
LB	22	(Sweden) Adam Johansson	(yellow card) 69'
RM	18	(Sweden) Darijan Bojanić		(substituted off) 71'
CM	5	(Sweden) Philip Haglund	(yellow card) 64'
CM	15	(Sweden) Jakob Johansson
LM	17	(Sweden) Sam Larsson
FW	9	(Denmark) Lasse Vibe
FW	11	(Sweden) Robin Söder
Substitutes:
DF	3	(Iceland) Logi Valgarðsson
GK	12	(Sweden) Marcus Sandberg
DF	14	(Iceland) Hjálmar Jónsson
FW	19	(Sweden) Hannes Stiller		(substituted in) 90+3'
MF	21	(Sweden) Pontus Farnerud		(substituted in) 71'
DF	24	(Sweden) Mikael Dyrestam
MF	27	(Sweden) Joel Allansson
Manager:
(Sweden) Mikael Stahre

MATCH OFFICIALS

- Assistant referees:
  - Fredrik Nilsson (Svalöv)
  - Magnus Sjöblom (Asmundtorp)
- Fourth official: Kaspar Sjöberg (Malmö)

MATCH RULES

- 90 minutes.
- 30 minutes of extra-time if necessary.
- Penalty shoot-out if scores still level.
- Seven named substitutes.
- Maximum of three substitutions.

== See also ==
- 2013 Allsvenskan
- 2012–13 Svenska Cupen
