= Sixten Mohlin =

Cape Verdean footballer

Personal information
- Full name: Sixten Joaquim Mohlin
- Date of birth: 17 January 1996 (age 30)
- Place of birth: Rotterdam, Netherlands
- Height: 1.90 m (6 ft 3 in)
- Position: Goalkeeper

Youth career
- 2001–2005: Kristianstads FF
- 2005–2008: Åhus HBK
- 2008–2014: Malmö FF

Senior career*
Years	Team	Apps	(Gls)
2013–2018	Malmö FF	0	(0)
2015	→ Västerås SK (loan)	6	(0)
2015–2017	→ Kristianstad FC (loan)	55	(0)
2018	→ Dalkurd FF (loan)	19	(0)
2019–2021	Östersunds FK	14	(0)
2022–2024	Örgryte IS	7	(0)

International career
2011–2013	Sweden U17	18	(0)
2014–2015	Sweden U19	10	(0)
2021–2022	Cape Verde	4	(0)
- * Club domestic league appearances and goals

Sixten Joaquim Mohlin (born 17 January 1996) is a former footballer who played as a goalkeeper. Born in the Netherlands and raised in Sweden, he played for the Cape Verde national team.

== International career ==
Mohlin was born in the Netherlands to a Swedish father and a Cape Verdean mother, and moved to Sweden at the age of 1. He was a youth international for Sweden at the under-17 and under-19 stages. He represented the Cape Verde national team in a friendly 2–0 loss to Senegal on 8 June 2021.

== Honours ==
Sweden U17

- FIFA U-17 World Cup third place: 2013
