= Benjamin Fadi =

Ghanaian footballer

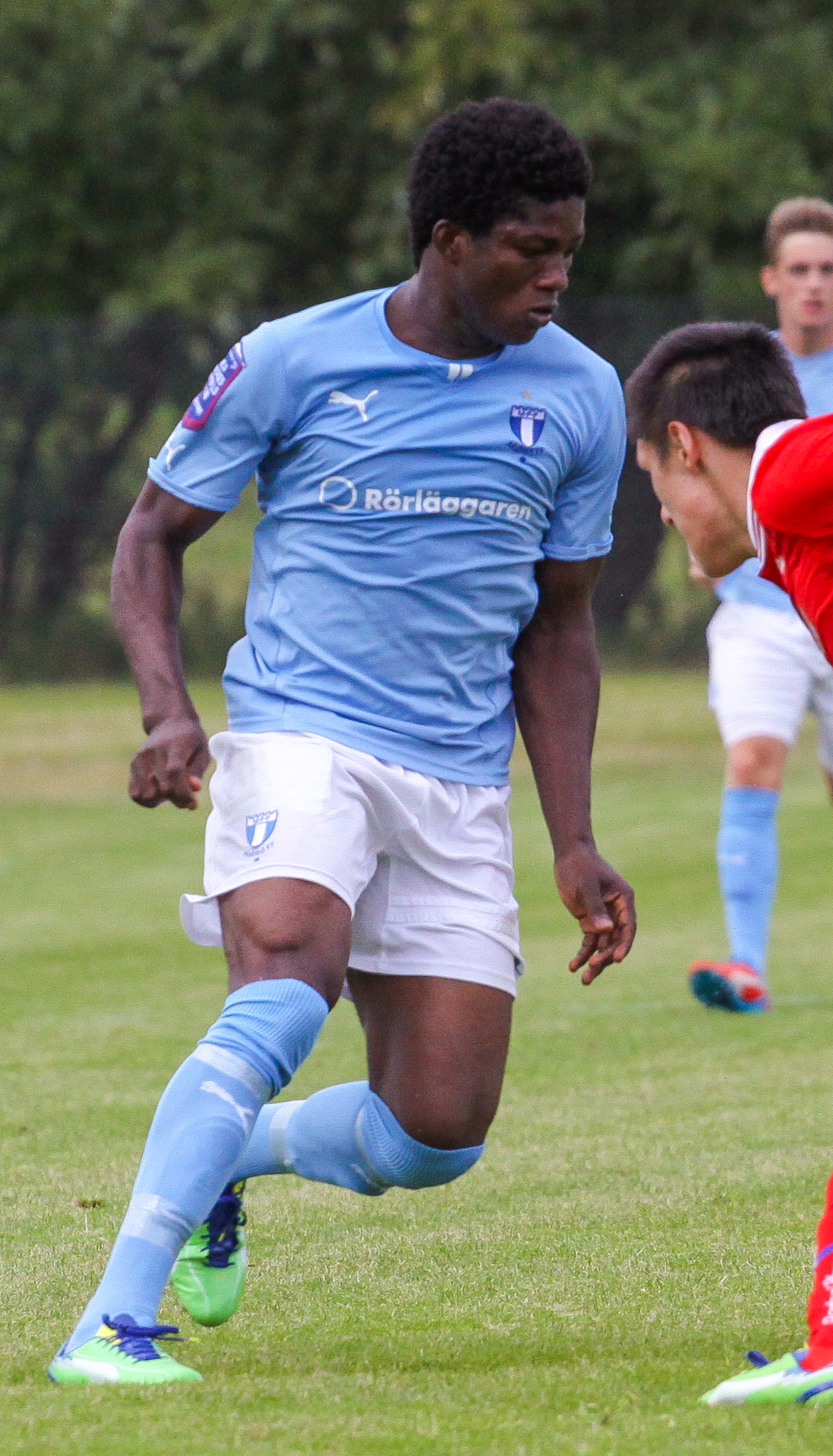

Personal information
- Full name: Benjamin Annan Fadi
- Date of birth: 16 March 1995 (age 31)
- Place of birth: Ghana
- Height: 1.84 m (6 ft 1/2 in)
- Position: Forward

Senior career*
| Years | Team | Apps | (Gls) |
| 2011–2013 | Heart of Lions | 18 | (5) |
| 2013–2016 | Malmö FF | 2 | (0) |
| 2014 | → IFK Värnamo (loan) | 26 | (5) |
| 2015 | → Mjällby AIF (loan) | 11 | (1) |
| 2016–2017 | FK Karlskrona | 42 | (17) |
| 2018 | Nosaby IF | 24 | (2) |
| 2019 | FK Karlskrona | 19 | (4) |
| 2020 | Assyriska FF | 13 | (4) |
| 2021 | FC Arlanda | 5 | (2) |

International career^{‡}
| –2012 | Ghana U20 | 10 | (6) |
- * Club domestic league appearances and goals as of 3 April 2022 ‡ National team caps and goals as of 12 December 2012

Benjamin Fadi (born 16 March 1995) is a Ghanaian footballer, playing as a forward.

== Career ==
=== Heart of Lions ===
Fadi started his professional career in his native Ghana at Heart of Lions in the Ghana Premier League. For his first season he played 13 matches and scored four times. For his second season he played five times and scored once in the premier league before leaving the club.

=== Malmö FF ===
On 20 December 2012 it was announced that Fadi would transfer to Swedish side Malmö FF. He signed his contract with the club on 16 March 2013, the day he turned 18 years old. This was because he was unavailable to play competitive football for the club until his 18th birthday. Fadi signed a four-year contract lasting until the end of the 2016 season. Fadi made his Allsvenskan debut for Malmö FF in an away fixture against Syrianska FC at Södertälje Fotbollsarena on 20 June 2013. After failing to make a mark during his first three years of his four-year contract, Fadi was released before the start of the 2016 season.

=== Loan spells ===
Malmö FF confirmed on 21 February 2014 that Fadi would be on loan to Superettan side IFK Värnamo for the duration of the 2014 season. During the season Fadi saw regular play as he made 26 appearances during the loan spell, scoring five times, helping the team to a mid-table finish. On 23 January 2015 Malmö FF confirmed that Fadi would move to newly relegated Mjällby AIF on loan for the 2015 season. Fadi failed to impress at Mjällby, and spent most of his time there on the bench, as the club was relegated from Superettan.

=== FK Karlskrona ===
On 8 March 2016 it was announced that he would play the upcoming season for FK Karlskrona of the Swedish Division 2.

== Career statistics ==
As of 27 November 2018.

| Club | Season | League | | Cup | | Continental | | Total | |
| Club | Season | Apps | Goals | Apps | Goals | Apps | Goals | Apps | Goals |
|---|---|---|---|---|---|---|---|---|---|
| Heart of Lions | 2011–12 | 13 | 4 | — | | — | | 13 | 4 |
| Heart of Lions | 2012–13 | 5 | 1 | — | | — | | 5 | 1 |
| Heart of Lions | Total | 18 | 5 | — | | — | | 18 | 5 |
| Malmö FF | 2013 | 2 | 0 | 1 | 1 | 0 | 0 | 3 | 1 |
| Malmö FF | Total | 2 | 0 | 1 | 1 | 0 | 0 | 3 | 1 |
| IFK Värnamo | 2014 | 26 | 5 | 1 | 0 | — | | 27 | 5 |
| IFK Värnamo | Total | 26 | 5 | 1 | 0 | 0 | 0 | 27 | 5 |
| Mjällby AIF | 2015 | 11 | 1 | 2 | 0 | — | | 13 | 1 |
| Mjällby AIF | Total | 11 | 1 | 2 | 0 | 0 | 0 | 13 | 1 |
| FK Karlskrona | 2016 | 25 | 13 | 0 | 0 | — | | 25 | 13 |
| FK Karlskrona | 2017 | 17 | 4 | 0 | 0 | — | | 17 | 4 |
| FK Karlskrona | Total | 42 | 17 | 0 | 0 | 0 | 0 | 42 | 17 |
| Nosaby IF | 2018 | 24 | 2 | — | | — | | 24 | 2 |
| Nosaby IF | Total | 24 | 2 | 0 | 0 | 0 | 0 | 24 | 2 |
| Career total | | 123 | 28 | 4 | 1 | 0 | 0 | 127 | 29 |
