= Erik Berg (footballer) =

Swedish footballer (born 1988)

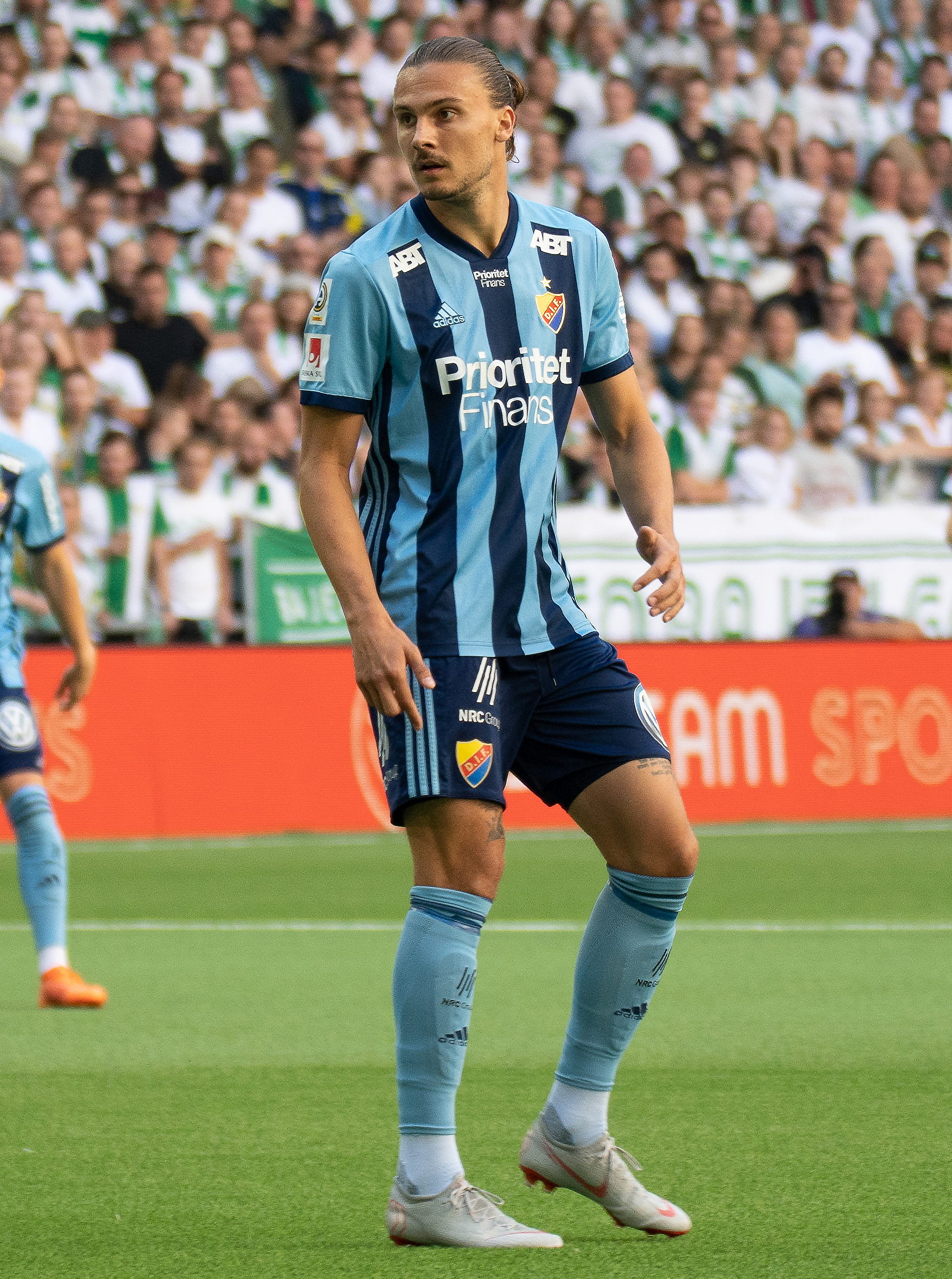

Personal information
- Full name: Anders Erik Berg
- Birth name: Anders Erik Johansson
- Date of birth: 30 December 1988 (age 37)
- Place of birth: Falkenberg, Sweden
- Height: 1.92 m (6 ft 4 in)
- Position: Defender

Youth career
- –2008: Falkenbergs FF

Senior career*
Years	Team	Apps	(Gls)
2008–2011	Falkenbergs FF	98	(17)
2011–2012	GAIS	34	(5)
2013–2015	Malmö FF	55	(2)
2015–2016	Gent	9	(0)
2016–2018	Copenhagen	52	(3)
2018–2021	Djurgårdens IF	43	(5)
Total		291	(32)

International career
2014–2016	Sweden	12	(0)
- * Club domestic league appearances and goals

Anders Erik Berg (né Johansson; born 30 December 1988) is a Swedish former professional footballer who played as a defender. Beginning his career at Falkenbergs FF in 2008, he went on to represent GAIS, Malmö FF, Gent, and Copenhagen before retiring at Djurgårdens IF in 2021. A full international between 2014 and 2016, he won 12 caps for the Sweden national team and played at UEFA Euro 2016.

== Club career ==
=== Falkenbergs FF ===
Berg started his career at Superettan side Falkenbergs FF in 2008 when he was promoted to the first team squad. He was a frequent used substitute for his first season at the club but also started in 10 matches out of 23 played. For the 2009 season Berg had established himself as a regular in the starting lineup as he played 27 matches out of 30, all of which he started. He also scored 4 goals in the 2009 season as he was playing as a midfielder. His goal production increased to 7 for the 2010 season when he also played 27 matches for Falkenberg. In the 2011 season Berg managed to play 21 matches and score 6 goals before transferring to Allsvenskan club GAIS.

=== GAIS ===
Berg transferred to GAIS on 1 September 2011. GAIS expressed early on that they considered to play his as a defender instead as a midfielder. He played 7 matches and scored one goal for his first season in Allsvenskan. For the 2012 season he played 27 matches out of 30 and scored 4 goals. GAIS were relegated to Superettan at the end of the season. Berg was voted player of the year for GAIS in 2012.

=== Malmö FF ===
On 12 December 2012, Berg was presented as a Malmö FF player. He joined the club on 1 January 2013 when the transfer window opened in Sweden. Berg signed a four-year contract lasting until the end of the 2016 season. During his debut season at the club Berg played 17 matches in the league, primarily standing in for Filip Helander during the middle part of the season when he was injured. Berg scored two goals in three matches for the club during the group stage of the 2012–13 Svenska Cupen before the start of the league season. For the 2014 season Berg saw considerable more play as regular Pontus Jansson was sold during the summer transfer window. Berg made 25 appearances in the league and ten matches in the clubs 2014–15 UEFA Champions League campaign, of which five matches were in the group stage. For his performances in the league Berg was nominated for the award of Allsvenskan defender of the year.

=== Gent ===
On 9 July 2015, Berg left Swedish football for the first time as he agreed to join Belgian Pro League club Gent on a four-year contract. He was assigned the number five shirt. He made his Gent debut on 31 July 2015 in a 1–0 home victory against Genk. He went on to make eight more appearances for Gent, all in the league, before leaving the club permanently in January 2016.

=== Copenhagen ===
On 18 January 2016, Berg signed for Danish Superliga side Copenhagen for an undisclosed fee. He signed a contract until 2020 and wore the number five shirt.

=== Djurgårdens IF and retirement ===
On 26 June 2018, Berg was presented by Allsvenskan side Djurgårdens IF for an undisclosed fee rumored to be in the 8-9 million SEK range. He signed a 4.5 year contract keeping him at the Stockholm club through 2022 where he will wear the jersey number 21. In 2019, he helped the club win the 2019 Allsvenskan title.

On 11 June 2021, Berg announced his retirement from professional football after a couple of injury-plagued seasons.

== International career ==
Berg made his international debut for Sweden in 2014. He was selected for Euro 2016 where he played in all three games before Sweden was eliminated in the group stage. Berg retired from the national team after the tournament at the age of 27, having played 12 international games.

== Personal life ==
In 2018, Berg married television presenter Carina Berg, thereby changing his last name, Johansson, to his wife's in 2019.

Unlike other footballers, he had the unusual trait of being totally uninterested in watching football. He only ever watched matches when he had to prepare himself for forthcoming games, viewing the sport solely as his profession.

== Career statistics ==
=== Club ===
Club	Season	League			Cup		Continental		Total	
Club	Season	Division	Apps	Goals	Apps	Goals	Apps	Goals	Apps	Goals
Falkenbergs FF	2008	Superettan	23	0	—		—		23	0
Falkenbergs FF	2009	Superettan	27	4	—		—		27	4
Falkenbergs FF	2010	Superettan	27	7	1	0	—		28	7
Falkenbergs FF	2011	Superettan	21	6	3	1	—		24	7
Falkenbergs FF	Total		98	17	4	1	—		102	18
GAIS	2011	Allsvenskan	7	1	0	0	—		7	1
GAIS	2012	Allsvenskan	27	4	1	0	—		28	4
GAIS	Total		34	5	1	0	—		35	5
Malmö FF	2013	Allsvenskan	17	0	2	2	5	0	24	2
Malmö FF	2014	Allsvenskan	25	0	5	0	10	0	40	0
Malmö FF	2015	Allsvenskan	13	2	4	0	0	0	17	2
Malmö FF	Total		55	2	11	2	15	0	81	4
Gent	2015–16	Belgian Pro League	9	0	0	0	0	0	9	0
Gent	Total		9	0	0	0	0	0	9	0
Copenhagen	2015–16	Danish Superliga	13	0	3	0	0	0	16	0
Copenhagen	2016–17	Danish Superliga	28	1	3	0	15	0	46	1
Copenhagen	2017–18	Danish Superliga	11	2	0	0	4	0	15	2
Copenhagen	Total		52	3	6	0	19	0	77	3
Djurgårdens IF	2018	Allsvenskan	11	0	0	0	2	0	13	0
Djurgårdens IF	2019	Allsvenskan	11	2	0	0	—		11	2
Djurgårdens IF	2020	Allsvenskan	21	3	0	0	1	0	22	3
Djurgårdens IF	2021	Allsvenskan	0	0	0	0	0	0	0	0
Djurgårdens IF	Total		43	5	0	0	3	0	46	5
Career total			291	32	22	3	37	0	350	35

=== International ===
Appearances and goals by national team and year

National team	Year	Apps	Goals
Sweden	2014	1	0
Sweden	2015	7	0
Sweden	2016	4	0
Total		12	0

== Honours ==
Malmö FF

- Allsvenskan: 2013, 2014
- Svenska Supercupen: 2013, 2014

Copenhagen

- Danish Superliga: 2015–16, 2016–17
- Danish Cup: 2015–16, 2016–17

Djurgårdens IF

- Allsvenskan: 2019
