= 2014 Malmö FF season =

Malmö FF
2014 season
- Chairman: Håkan Jeppsson
- Head coach: Åge Hareide
- Stadium: Swedbank Stadion
- Allsvenskan: 1st
- 2013–14 Svenska Cupen: Semi-finals
- Svenska Supercupen: Winners
- 2014–15 UEFA Champions League: Group stage
- Top goalscorer: League: Markus Rosenberg (15); All: Markus Rosenberg (24)
- Highest home attendance: 20,500 vs. Olympiacos (1 October 2014, UEFA Champions League) vs. Atlético Madrid (4 November 2014, UEFA Champions League) vs. Juventus (26 November 2014, UEFA Champions League)
- Lowest home attendance: 1,266 vs. IF Elfsborg (9 November 2014, Svenska Supercupen)
- Average home league attendance: 14,090 (in Allsvenskan); 13,029 (in all competitions)
Home colours	Away colours	Third colours

The 2014 season was Malmö FF's 103rd in existence, their 79th season in Allsvenskan and their 14th consecutive season in the league. They competed in Allsvenskan where they finished first, 2013–14 Svenska Cupen where they were knocked out in the semi-finals, Svenska Supercupen where they won the competition against IF Elfsborg and the 2014–15 UEFA Champions League where they were knocked out in the group stage. Malmö FF also participated in one competition in which the club continued playing in for the 2015 season, 2014–15 Svenska Cupen. This season was the first time since the 2005 season that the club played consecutive seasons in European competition. The season began with the group stage of Svenska Cupen on 1 March, league play started on 30 March and concluded on 1 November. The season concluded with the last Champions League group stage match on 9 December.

For the second consecutive season, the club had to appoint a new club captain as Jiloan Hamad left the club after the previous season. Midfielder Guillermo Molins was chosen as Hamad's successor as club captain, Markus Rosenberg took over the captaincy temporarily after the first half of the season as Molins was out with an injury for the rest of the year. Åge Hareide was appointed as the club's new manager on 9 January 2014, this was after Rikard Norling announced his resignation on 27 November 2013.

Malmö FF qualified for the group stage of the UEFA Champions League for the first time in the club's history. They were also the first Swedish club to qualify in 14 years since Helsingborgs IF in the 2000–01 season. The club won their second consecutive league title, their 18th Swedish championship title and 21st Allsvenskan title on 5 October 2014 when they defeated AIK in an away fixture at Friends Arena in the 27th round of the league. Malmö FF became the first Swedish club to win back to back league titles in eleven years, the last club to achieve this feat was Djurgårdens IF in 2003. The last time Malmö FF won consecutive league titles was in 1989 and consecutive Swedish championships in 1975.

== Summary ==
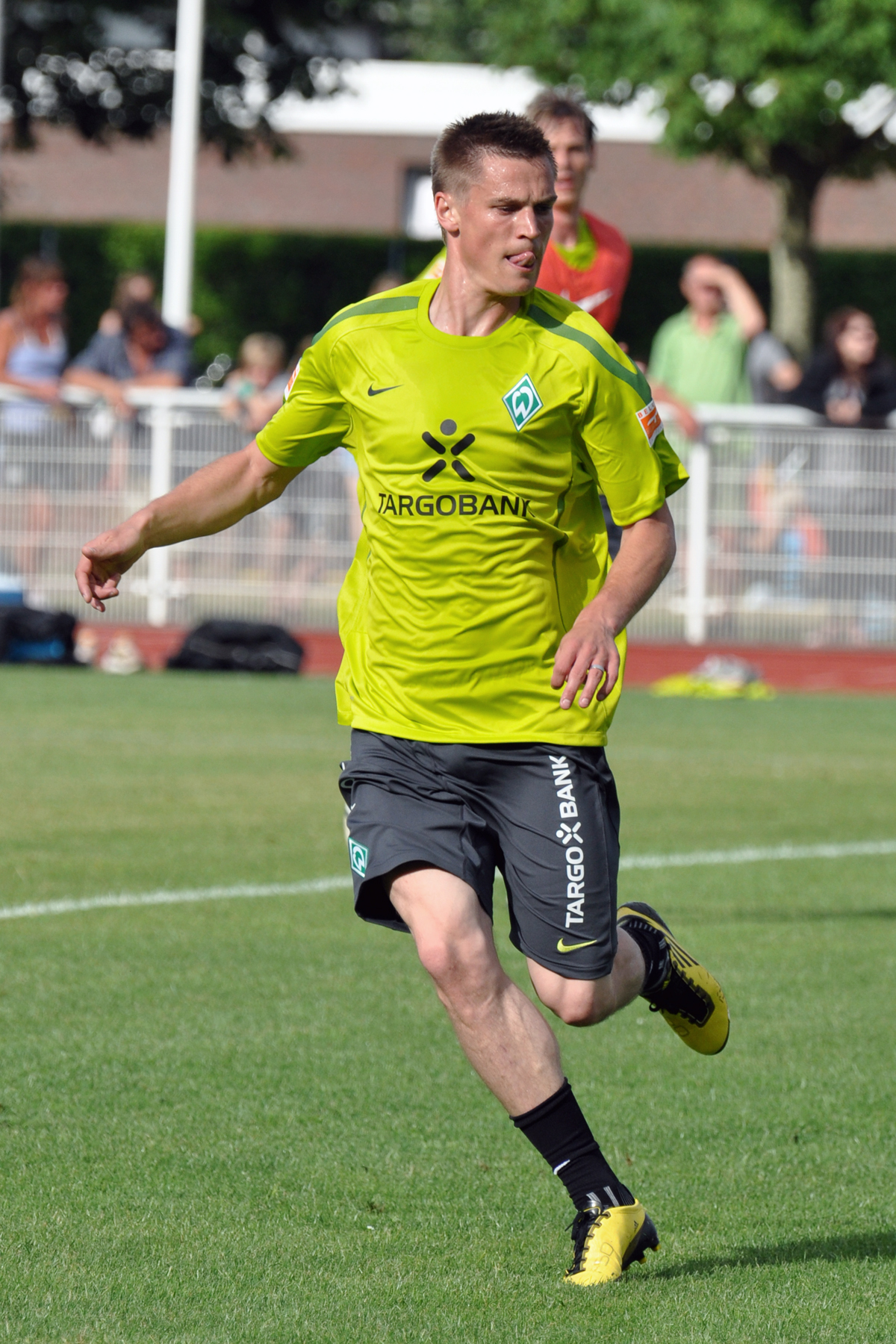
Forward Markus Rosenberg joined Malmö FF from West Bromwich Albion, returning to the club after nine years abroad.

=== Allsvenskan ===
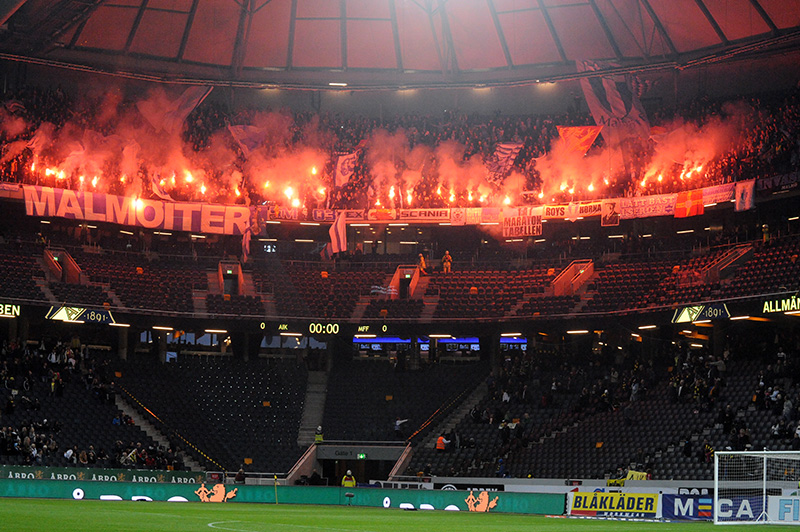
Malmö FF fans at Friends Arena at the away game against AIK on 5 October 2014 where Malmö FF defended the league title

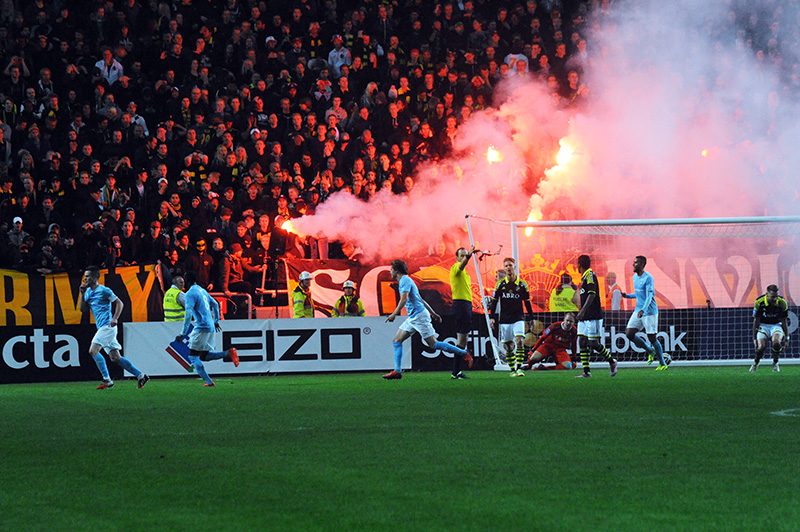
Markus Rosenberg celebrates scoring the title-winning goal against AIK.

The league season started on 30 March 2014 and concluded on 1 November 2014. The official season fixtures were released on 20 December 2013. Malmö FF started the season with a home fixture against newcomers Falkenbergs FF on 30 March, Malmö FF won the match 3–0. The season featured a summer break due to the 2014 FIFA World Cup held between 12 June and 13 July, Malmö FF played no league matches between 1 June and 6 July. The club played its last league fixture of the season away against Åtvidabergs FF on 1 November, Åtvidaberg won the match 2–1.

The club got off to a strong start with four wins in the first matches against Falkenbergs FF, IFK Göteborg, Gefle IF and Örebro SK, not conceding a goal until the fourth match. As a result of this Malmö FF took the lead in the league table from the first round of matches. The club's first loss of points came in the fifth round with a 2–2 home draw against Djurgårdens IF, a club which Malmö FF had lost both matches against in the previous season. After bouncing back with a win in the sixth round in an away fixture against IFK Norrköping, the club lost its first league match at home against BK Häcken 1–2. Nevertheless, Malmö FF held on to pole position in the league table and proceeded to win three matches in a row after the loss against Häcken. This string of matches included the Scanian derby away against Helsingborgs IF, a home fixture against Halmstads BK and the away fixture against Mjällby AIF, a club Malmö FF had never previously defeated at Strandvallen. The eleventh round of league play saw Malmö FF meet pre-season favourites AIK in a home fixture that ended 2–2 after Malmö FF had come back from a 0–2 score. The last fixture of the spring season was an away fixture against IF Elfsborg at Borås Arena on 1 June, the venue where Malmö FF secured last season's league title. Malmö FF won the match 1–0 and created a six points margin down to Elfsborg and Kalmar FF who were positioned second and third respectively.

After the 2014 FIFA World Cup, Malmö FF faced IF Brommapojkarna in an away fixture on 6 July, a match that finished in a 1–1 draw after a fairly uneventful match. This was followed up with a 3–0 home win against Åtvidabergs FF before another away draw against Kalmar FF. After having played 15 out of 30 league fixtures Malmö FF were still six points ahead of the team in second place, AIK. The club maintained the six-point gap in the two following fixtures, by winning 3–1 at home against Kalmar and defeating newcomers Falkenberg 5–2 on the road. The six-point gap was reduced down to a four-point lead after a drawn home fixture against IFK Göteborg in the 18th round as AIK won their fixture in the same round. However, the lead was again increased to six points in the following round as Malmö FF turned 0–2 at half-time against Örebro at home to 3–2 in full-time in the 19th round. The lead was increased further to a seven-point gap in the 20th round when Malmö FF tied an away fixture against Gefle at the same time as AIK lost against Örebro.

Following a home win against Norrköping, Malmö FF entered a period of winless games starting with a 2–0 loss against Djurgården in the 22nd round. This decreased the club's lead to four points in the league table. Malmö FF followed to play two draws, 3–3 in the away fixture against Häcken where the club came back from a 3–1 deficit and 1–1 in the Scanian derby at home against Helsingborg where Markus Rosenberg's late goal was equalized in the following minute by the away team. This was the first time Malmö FF played three matches without a win since May 2013. However, AIK and other teams chasing Malmö FF in the top of the table failed to capitalize on the club's shortage of points and Malmö FF's lead was instead increased to six points with only six matches left to play. In the next round, Malmö FF defeated Halmstad away, this was the club's seventh successive victory at Örjans Vall since 2007. The win meant an eight-point difference to the nearest competitor in the table, Elfsborg. The lead was increased to nine points in the following round as Malmö FF won at home against Mjällby, 4–1, while Elfsborg saw themselves passed by IFK Göteborg. These results made it possible for Malmö FF to secure the league title in the 27th round in the away game against title competitors AIK at Friends Arena on 5 October. As IFK Göteborg and Elfsborg lost their matches before kick-off between Malmö FF and AIK, the club needed a draw to secure the title. The club's 18th Swedish championship and 21st Allsvenskan title was won after a 3–2 win against AIK. The result meant a 12-point lead with only nine points left to play for in the last three fixtures.

With nothing left to play for in the last three matches, Malmö FF only managed to gather three points out of nine. In the 28th round the club hosted Elfsborg at home, Elfsborg won the match 2–1 after two goals in the second half for the guests. The last home game of the season against Brommapojkarna ended in a 2–0 win in a match full of chances for the home team. The last match of the league season took place on 1 November at Kopparvallen against Åtvidaberg. Malmö FF took the lead in the first half with a goal from former Åtvidaberg player Anton Tinnerholm who joined Malmö FF in the summer of 2014. Åtvidaberg managed to turn the game around and won 2–1, the last goal being scored by Kristian Bergström who had previously played for Malmö FF. This goal also made Bergström the league's oldest goalscorer of all time at 40 years of age. After the game, Malmö FF were presented with the league trophy Lennart Johanssons Pokal.

=== Svenska Cupen ===
Malmö FF qualified for the group stage of the 2013–14 Svenska Cupen in the 2013 season by beating Sävedalens IF 6–0 on 21 August 2013. The club was seeded first in the group stage draw after finishing first in the 2013 Allsvenskan. The groups were drawn on 13 November 2013 and Malmö FF were drawn against three clubs from the 2013 Superettan, fourth-placed Degerfors IF, fifth-placed Hammarby IF and sixth-placed Ängelholms FF. The group stage was played between 1 and 15 March 2014 before the start of the league season.

The first match was a home fixture against Degerfors IF at Malmö IP on 1 March, Malmö FF won the match 7–1 after a hat-trick by Simon Kroon. The second match was an away fixture against Ängelholms FF on 8 March, a Scanian derby, Malmö FF won the match 3–0. The fixture was played at Malmö IP as Ängelholms IP was not approved for play, Ängelholm was technically designated as the home team for the fixture. The third and final match was a home fixture against Hammarby IF on 15 March at Malmö Stadion which Malmö FF won 3–2, this was the first meeting between the two clubs since Hammarby was relegated to Superettan after the 2009 Allsvenskan season. With an attendance of 8,276 Malmö FF set a new record attendance for a match in the Svenska Cupen group stage.

Malmö FF won the group and advanced to the quarter-finals where they faced fellow Allsvenskan club IF Brommapojkarna. The quarter-finals were drawn on 17 March, the club was seeded in the draw after finishing as one of the four best group winners. The quarter-final was played at home on 22 March, Malmö FF won the match 2–0. The semi-finals were drawn on 25 March with Malmö FF drawn against rivals Helsingborgs IF in a home fixture. The Scanian derby was played at Swedbank Stadion on 1 May with Helsingborg winning the match 2–0. Helsingborg advanced to the final at Friends Arena on 18 May where they lost to IF Elfsborg.

The draw for the second round of the 2014–15 Svenska Cupen was held on 7 August. Malmö FF faced Division 1 side IS Halmia at Örjans Vall on 15 November. The match was initially planned to be played in August but was postponed due to Malmö FF's participation in the qualification for the UEFA Champions League. Malmö FF won 2–1 after extra time and progressed to the group stage to be held in March 2015.

=== Svenska Supercupen ===
Malmö FF qualified for the 2014 Svenska Supercupen by winning the 2014 Allsvenskan on 5 October 2014. The match was played at home at Malmö Stadion on 9 November 2014 and the club's opponents were the 2013–14 Svenska Cupen winners IF Elfsborg. This was the second successive and third time in total that the club competed in Svenska Supercupen. Malmö FF won their second successive title after winning 5–4 on penalties after the match had ended 2–2 after extra time. Isaac Kiese Thelin scored Malmö FF's first goal in the 89th minute of ordinary time, equalizing Elfsborg's 1–0 lead. In the second half of extra time Emil Forsberg made it 2–1 to Malmö FF before Elfsborg could equalize to 2–2 after having scored a penalty in the 120th minute. In the penalty shoot-out Malmö FF scored in five out of six penalties while Elfsborg scored four, Erdal Rakip scored the match-winning penalty.

=== UEFA Champions League ===
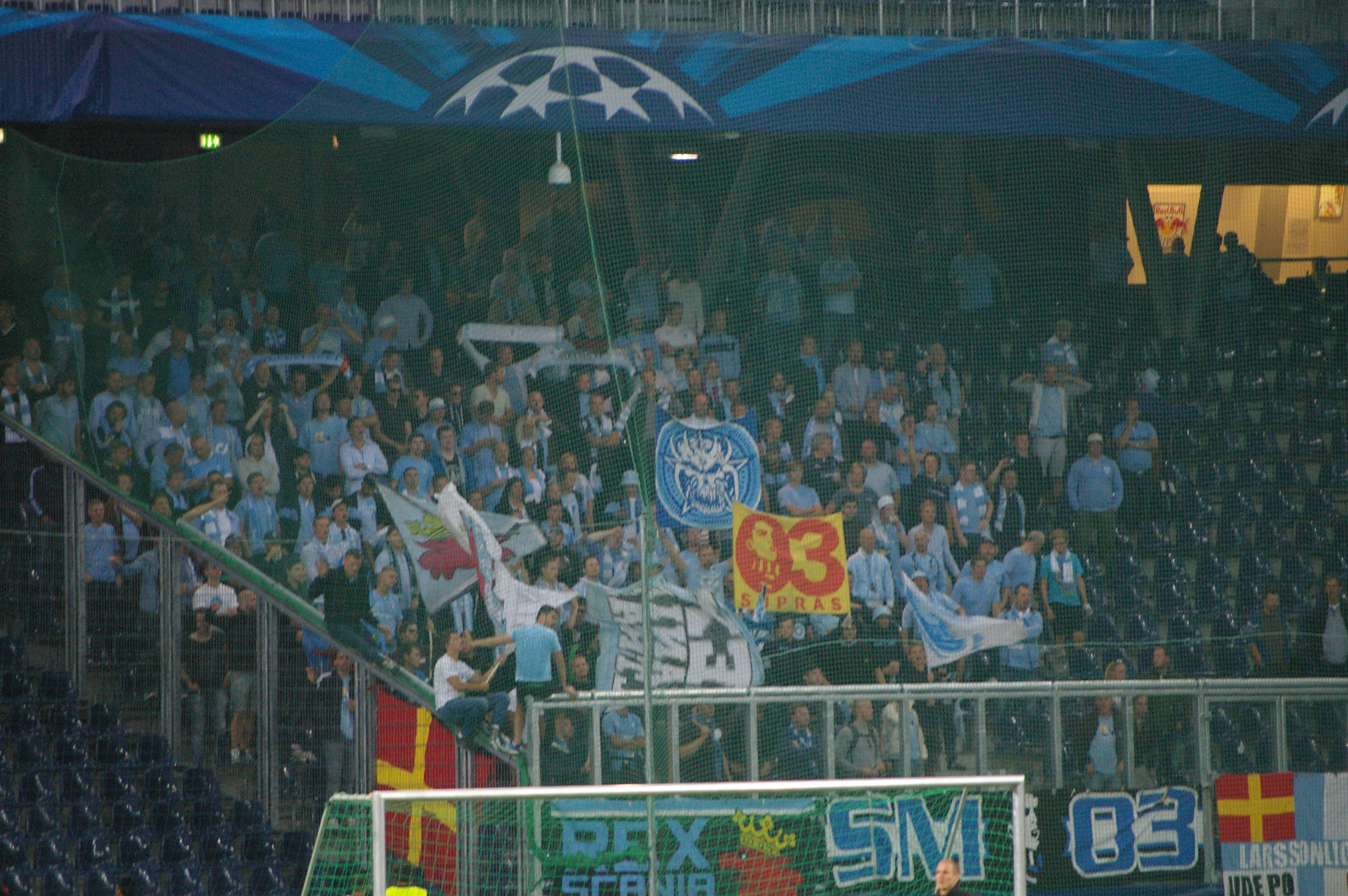
Malmö FF fans at Red Bull Arena at the away game against Red Bull Salzburg on 19 August 2014.

Malmö FF qualified for the 2014–15 UEFA Champions League by merit of finishing first in the 2013 Allsvenskan. The club entered the competition in the second round of qualification. The draw for the second qualifying round was held on 23 June, Malmö FF was unseeded in the draw. The club was drawn against the 2013 Latvian champions FK Ventspils. This was only the second time that Malmö FF faced Latvian opposition in European competition, and the first time since 1996. The first leg of the fixture was played at home on 16 July and ended in a 0–0 draw after a game of few chances from either side. The away fixture at Ventspils Olimpiskais Stadions was played on 23 July and ended with a 1–0 win for Malmö FF, thus taking them through to the third qualifying round with 1–0 on aggregate.

Malmö FF faced Czech side Sparta Prague in the third qualifying round, Malmö FF were unseeded in the draw held on 18 July. The first leg was played at the Generali Arena in Prague on 29 July and ended in a 4–2 defeat for Malmö FF after leading 2–1 at half-time. The second leg was played on 6 August at Swedbank Stadion in Malmö and ended with a 2–0 win for Malmö FF. The tie ended in a 4–4 draw with Malmö FF advancing due to the away goals rule. This was the second time Malmö FF faced a club from the Czech Republic in European competition and the first time since 1996.

The draw for the play-off round was held on 8 August, Malmö FF was unseeded in the draw. The club was drawn against Austrian champions Red Bull Salzburg. This was the third time Malmö FF faced Austrian opposition in European competition, the last time being in the group stage of the 2011–12 UEFA Europa League against Austria Wien. The first leg of the tie was played at Red Bull Arena in Wals-Siezenheim on 19 August. The match ended in a 2–1 defeat for Malmö FF after Emil Forsberg scored a late goal in the 90th minute. The second leg was played at home at Swedbank Stadion on 27 August and ended in a 3–0 win for Malmö FF which made it 4–2 on aggregate. Thus the club qualified for the group stage of the UEFA Champions League for the first time in their history. They were also the first Swedish club to qualify in 14 years since Helsingborgs IF in the 2000–01 season.

The draw for the group stage was held on 28 August 2014 in Monaco. Malmö FF were seeded in pot 4 which consisted of the lowest ranked teams. The club was drawn against 2014 UEFA Champions League finalists and Spanish champions Atlético Madrid, Italian champions Juventus and Greek champions Olympiacos. Malmö FF played their first match of the group stage on 16 September, an away fixture against Juventus, and concluded the group stage on 9 December with an away fixture against Olympiacos. In the six group stage matches Malmö FF gathered three points and ended up in fourth place, thus being knocked out of the Champions League and further European competition for the 2014–15 season. In the six matches the club won one match, the home fixture against Olympiacos 2–0, and lost the other five matches. Olympiacos was also the only team that Malmö FF managed to score against, scoring two in the home match and two in the 4–2 away loss.

== Key events ==
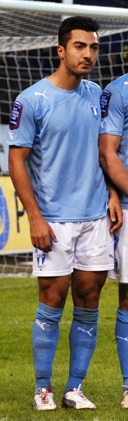
Midfielder and captain Jiloan Hamad left the club for German side 1899 Hoffenheim after six seasons.

- 30 October 2013: Midfielder and captain Jiloan Hamad leaves the club, transferring to Hoffenheim.
- 25 November 2013: Midfielder Ivo Pękalski leaves the club, transferring to BK Häcken.
- 27 November 2013: Manager Rikard Norling announces his resignation from the club.
- 3 December 2013: Defender Mahmut Özen joins the club on a four-year contract, transferring from Mjällby AIF.
- 9 December 2013: Defender Johan Hammar signs a new three-year contract, keeping him at the club until the end of the 2016 season.
- 23 December 2013: Goalkeeper and vice captain Johan Dahlin leaves the club, transferring to Gençlerbirliği.
- 9 January 2014: The club announces the appointment of Åge Hareide as the new manager. Goalkeeper Zlatan Azinović joins the club on a two-year contract, transferring from Kalmar FF.
- 21 January 2014: Forward Dardan Rexhepi leaves the club, transferring to IF Brommapojkarna.
- 30 January 2014: Midfielder Erik Friberg leaves the club, transferring to Bologna. Midfielder Guillermo Molins is chosen as the club's new captain.
- 3 February 2014: Forward Markus Rosenberg joins the club on a three-year contract, transferring from West Bromwich Albion.
- 14 February 2014: Forward Alexander Nilsson leaves the club on loan to Trelleborgs FF for the duration of the season.
- 19 February 2014: Defender Pa Konate leaves the club on loan to Östers IF for the duration of the season. At the same time he signs a new four-year contract, keeping him at the club until the end of the 2017 season.
- 21 February 2014: Forward Benjamin Fadi leaves the club on loan to IFK Värnamo until 15 July 2014.
- 3 March 2014: Forward Petter Thelin leaves the club on loan to Skellefteå FF for the duration of the season.
- 11 March 2014: Defender Tobias Malm leaves the club on loan to Östersunds FK for the duration of the season.
- 14 March 2014: Goalkeeper Sixten Mohlin signs a new five-year contract, keeping him at the club until the end of the 2018 season.
- 24 March 2014: Midfielder Petar Petrović signs a new three-and-a-half-year contract, keeping him at the club until the end of the 2017 season.
- 12 June 2014: Defender Pontus Jansson leaves the club, transferring to Torino.
- 20 June 2014: Defender Miiko Albornoz leaves the club, transferring to Hannover.
- 1 July 2014: Midfielder Pawel Cibicki signs a new three-and-a-half-year contract, keeping him at the club until the end of the 2017 season.
- 5 July 2014: Forward Isaac Kiese Thelin joins the club on a three-and-a-half-year contract, transferring from IFK Norrköping.
- 8 July 2014: Midfielder Enoch Kofi Adu joins the club on a three-and-a-half-year contract, transferring from Club Brugge.
- 10 July 2014: Midfielder Piotr Johansson is promoted to the first team squad on a youth contract basis.
- 11 July 2014: Defender Anton Tinnerholm joins the club on a three-and-a-half-year contract, transferring from Åtvidabergs FF.
- 14 July 2014: Forward Benjamin Fadi extends his loan agreement with IFK Värnamo so it covers the rest of the season.
- 15 July 2014: Midfielder Erdal Rakip signs a new three-and-a-half-year contract, keeping him at the club until the end of the 2017 season.
- 15 July 2014: Defender Mahmut Özen leaves the club on loan to Kayseri Erciyesspor for the duration of the 2014–15 season.
- 15 July 2014: Forward Agon Mehmeti joins the club on a three-and-a-half-year contract, transferring from Palermo.
- 23 July 2014: Defender Jasmin Sudić leaves the club, transferring to Mjällby AIF.
- 24 July 2014: Midfielder Petar Petrović leaves the club on loan to Radnički Niš for the duration of the season.
- 5 October 2014: Malmö FF wins their 18th Swedish championship and their 21st Allsvenskan title after defeating AIK with 3–2.
- 6 November 2014: Goalkeeper Robin Olsen is selected as Allsvenskan goalkeeper of the year, midfielder Emil Forsberg is selected as Allsvenskan midfielder of the year, forward Markus Rosenberg is selected as Allsvenskan forward of the year and Allsvenskan most valuable player of the year and head coach Åge Hareide is selected as Allsvenskan manager of the year.
- 9 November 2014: Malmö FF wins their 2nd Svenska Supercupen title after defeating IF Elfsborg in the final after penalties.
- 11 November 2014: Forward Magnus Eriksson's goal against Red Bull Salzburg on 27 August 2014 is selected as Swedish goal of the year.

== Players ==
=== Squad ===
Note: Flags indicate national team as defined under FIFA eligibility rules; some limited exceptions apply. Players may hold more than one non-FIFA nationality.

No.	Pos.	Nation	Player
2	DF	SWE	Matias Concha
3	DF	CHI	Miiko Albornoz
3	DF	SWE	Anton Tinnerholm
4	DF	SWE	Filip Helander
5	DF	SWE	Pontus Jansson
5	MF	SWE	Erdal Rakip
6	MF	FIN	Markus Halsti
7	FW	SWE	Magnus Eriksson
8	MF	GHA	Enoch Kofi Adu
9	FW	SWE	Markus Rosenberg (vice captain)
10	MF	SWE	Guillermo Molins (captain)
11	MF	SWE	Simon Thern
14	MF	SWE	Simon Kroon
15	MF	POL	Paweł Cibicki
16	GK	SWE	Sixten Mohlin

No.	Pos.	Nation	Player
17	MF	SWE	Petar Petrović
18	DF	SWE	Johan Hammar
20	DF	BRA	Ricardinho
21	DF	SWE	Erik Johansson
22	MF	SWE	Amin Nazari
23	DF	SWE	Jasmin Sudić
24	DF	TUR	Mahmut Özen
24	FW	SWE	Isaac Kiese Thelin
25	GK	DEN	Robin Olsen
26	FW	ALB	Agon Mehmeti
27	GK	SWE	Zlatan Azinović
32	DF	SWE	Pa Konate
33	MF	SWE	Emil Forsberg
34	DF	SWE	Alexander Blomqvist
35	MF	SWE	Piotr Johansson

==== Youth players with first-team appearances ====
Youth players who played a competitive match for the club in 2014.

Note: Flags indicate national team as defined under FIFA eligibility rules; some limited exceptions apply. Players may hold more than one non-FIFA nationality.

No. / Pos. / Nation / Player; 37 / DF / SWE / Franz Brorsson	No. / Pos. / Nation / Player; 38 / FW / TUR / Deniz Hümmet

=== Squad stats ===
Number	Position	Name	2014 Allsvenskan		2013–14 Svenska Cupen 2014–15 Svenska Cupen 2014 Svenska Supercupen		2014–15 UEFA Champions League		Total	
Number	Position	Name	Appearances	Goals	Appearances	Goals	Appearances	Goals	Appearances	Goals
2	DF	Matias Concha	8	0	2	0	3	0	13	0
3	DF	Anton Tinnerholm	14	1	2	0	10	0	26	1
4	DF	Filip Helander	28	1	5	1	10	0	43	2
5	MF	Erdal Rakip	15	0	4	0	4	0	23	0
6	MF	Markus Halsti	26	1	5	0	12	0	43	1
7	FW	Magnus Eriksson	30	5	6	1	11	1	47	7
8	MF	Enoch Kofi Adu	15	0	1	1	10	0	26	1
9	FW	Markus Rosenberg	28	15	4	2	12	7	44	24
10	MF	Guillermo Molins	11	8	4	5	0	0	15	13
11	MF	Simon Thern	14	2	7	0	3	0	24	2
14	MF	Simon Kroon	19	0	5	5	9	1	33	6
15	MF	Paweł Cibicki	21	3	4	0	7	0	32	3
16	GK	Sixten Mohlin	0	0	0	0	0	0	0	0
18	DF	Johan Hammar	7	0	2	0	3	0	12	0
20	DF	Ricardinho	23	0	6	0	10	0	39	0
21	DF	Erik Johansson	25	0	5	0	10	0	40	0
22	MF	Amin Nazari	10	0	1	0	3	0	14	0
24	FW	Isaac Kiese Thelin	14	5	1	1	12	2	27	8
25	GK	Robin Olsen	29	0	4	0	12	0	45	0
26	FW	Agon Mehmeti	10	2	1	0	4	0	15	2
27	GK	Zlatan Azinović	2	0	3	0	0	0	5	0
32	DF	Pa Konate	11	0	2	0	4	0	17	0
33	MF	Emil Forsberg	29	14	6	3	12	2	47	19
34	DF	Alexander Blomqvist	0	0	0	0	0	0	0	0
35	MF	Piotr Johansson	2	0	0	0	1	0	3	0
37	DF	Franz Brorsson	0	0	1	0	0	0	1	0
38	FW	Deniz Hümmet	0	0	1	0	0	0	1	0
Players that left the club during the season
3	DF	Miiko Albornoz	9	0	5	0	0	0	14	0
5	DF	Pontus Jansson	9	1	5	0	0	0	14	1
17	MF	Petar Petrović	0	0	1	0	0	0	1	0
23	DF	Jasmin Sudić	0	0	0	0	0	0	0	0
24	DF	Mahmut Özen	1	0	2	0	0	0	3	0

=== Players in/out ===
==== In ====
No.	Pos.	Nat.	Name	Age	Moving from	Type	Transfer window	Ends	Transfer fee	Source
29	DF	(Sweden)	Tobias Malm	21	Landskrona BoIS	Loan return	Winter	2014	—	mff.se
23	DF	(Sweden)	Jasmin Sudić	23	Mjällby AIF	Loan return	Winter	2014	—	mff.se
22	MF	(Sweden)	Amin Nazari	20	Assyriska FF	Loan return	Winter	2015	—	mff.se
28	FW	(Sweden)	Alexander Nilsson	21	Landskrona BoIS	Loan return	Winter	2014	—	mff.se
26	FW	(Sweden)	Petter Thelin	18	IF Limhamn Bunkeflo	Loan return	Winter	2015	—	mff.se
24	DF	(Turkey)	Mahmut Özen	25	Mjällby AIF	Bosman	Winter	2017	Free	mff.se
27	GK	(Sweden)	Zlatan Azinović	25	Kalmar FF	Bosman	Winter	2015	Free	fotbolltransfers.com
9	FW	(Sweden)	Markus Rosenberg	31	West Bromwich Albion (England)	Bosman	Winter	2016	Free	twitter.com
35	MF	(Sweden)	Piotr Johansson	19	Youth system	Promoted	Summer	undisclosed	—	mff.se
32	DF	(Sweden)	Pa Konate	20	Östers IF	Loan return	Summer	2017	—	sydsvenskan.se
24	FW	(Sweden)	Isaac Kiese Thelin	22	IFK Norrköping	Transfer	Summer	2017	(~ 1.0M SEK)	mff.se
3	DF	(Sweden)	Anton Tinnerholm	23	Åtvidabergs FF	Transfer	Summer	2017	(~ 1.3M SEK)	mff.se
26	FW	(Albania)	Agon Mehmeti	24	Palermo (Italy)	Transfer	Summer	2017	Free	mff.se
8	MF	(Ghana)	Enoch Kofi Adu	23	Club Brugge (Belgium)	Transfer	Summer	2017	(~ 5.0M SEK)	mff.se

==== Out ====
No.	Pos.	Nat.	Name	Age	Moving to	Type	Transfer window	Transfer fee	Source
10	MF	(Sweden)	Jiloan Hamad	23	1899 Hoffenheim (Germany)	End of contract	Winter	Free	mff.se
17	MF	(Sweden)	Ivo Pękalski	23	BK Häcken	End of contract	Winter	Free	mff.se
27	GK	(Sweden)	Johan Dahlin	27	Gençlerbirliği (Turkey)	Transfer	Winter	(~ 5.0M SEK)	mff.se
9	FW	(Sweden)	Dardan Rexhepi	22	IF Brommapojkarna	Transfer	Winter	(~ 0.4M SEK)	mff.se
8	MF	(Sweden)	Erik Friberg	27	Bologna (Italy)	Transfer	Winter	(~ 5.0M SEK)	mff.se
28	FW	(Sweden)	Alexander Nilsson	21	Trelleborgs FF	Loan	Winter	—	mff.se
32	DF	(Sweden)	Pa Konate	19	Östers IF	Loan	Winter	—	mff.se
19	FW	(Ghana)	Benjamin Fadi	18	IFK Värnamo	Loan	Winter	—	mff.se
26	FW	(Sweden)	Petter Thelin	19	Skellefteå FF	Loan	Winter	—	mff.se
29	DF	(Sweden)	Tobias Malm	22	Östersunds FK	Loan	Winter	—	mff.se
24	DF	(Turkey)	Mahmut Özen	25	Kayseri Erciyesspor (Turkey)	Loan	Summer	—	mff.se
5	DF	(Sweden)	Pontus Jansson	23	Torino (Italy)	Transfer	Summer	(~ 4.5M SEK)	mff.se
3	DF	(Chile)	Miiko Albornoz	23	Hannover 96 (Germany)	Transfer	Summer	(~ 15.0M SEK)	mff.se
23	DF	(Sweden)	Jasmin Sudić	23	Mjällby AIF	Transfer	Summer	Undisclosed	mff.se
17	MF	(Sweden)	Petar Petrović	18	Radnički Niš (Serbia)	Loan	Summer	—	fotbolltransfers.com

=== Disciplinary record ===
N	Pos.	Nat.	Name	Yellow card	Second yellow card	Red card	Notes
2	DF	(Sweden)	Concha	1	0	0	
3	DF	(Sweden)	Tinnerholm	3	0	0	
5	DF	(Sweden)	Jansson	3	1	0	
6	MF	(Finland)	Halsti	5	0	0	
7	FW	(Sweden)	Eriksson	2	0	0	
8	MF	(Ghana)	Adu	1	0	0	
9	FW	(Sweden)	Rosenberg	8	0	0	
10	MF	(Sweden)	Molins	1	0	0	
11	MF	(Sweden)	Thern	1	0	0	
14	MF	(Sweden)	Kroon	1	0	0	
15	MF	(Poland)	Cibicki	1	0	0	
18	DF	(Sweden)	Hammar	1	0	1	
20	DF	(Brazil)	Ricardinho	4	0	0	
21	DF	(Sweden)	Johansson	3	0	0	
25	GK	(Denmark)	Olsen	3	0	0	
26	FW	(Albania)	Mehmeti	2	0	0	
33	MF	(Sweden)	Forsberg	3	0	0	

Source: svenskfotboll.se
Only competitive matches
(yellow card) = Number of bookings; (second yellow card) = Number of sending offs after a second yellow card; (red card) = Number of sending offs by a direct red card.
Notes: Allsvenskan only

== Club ==
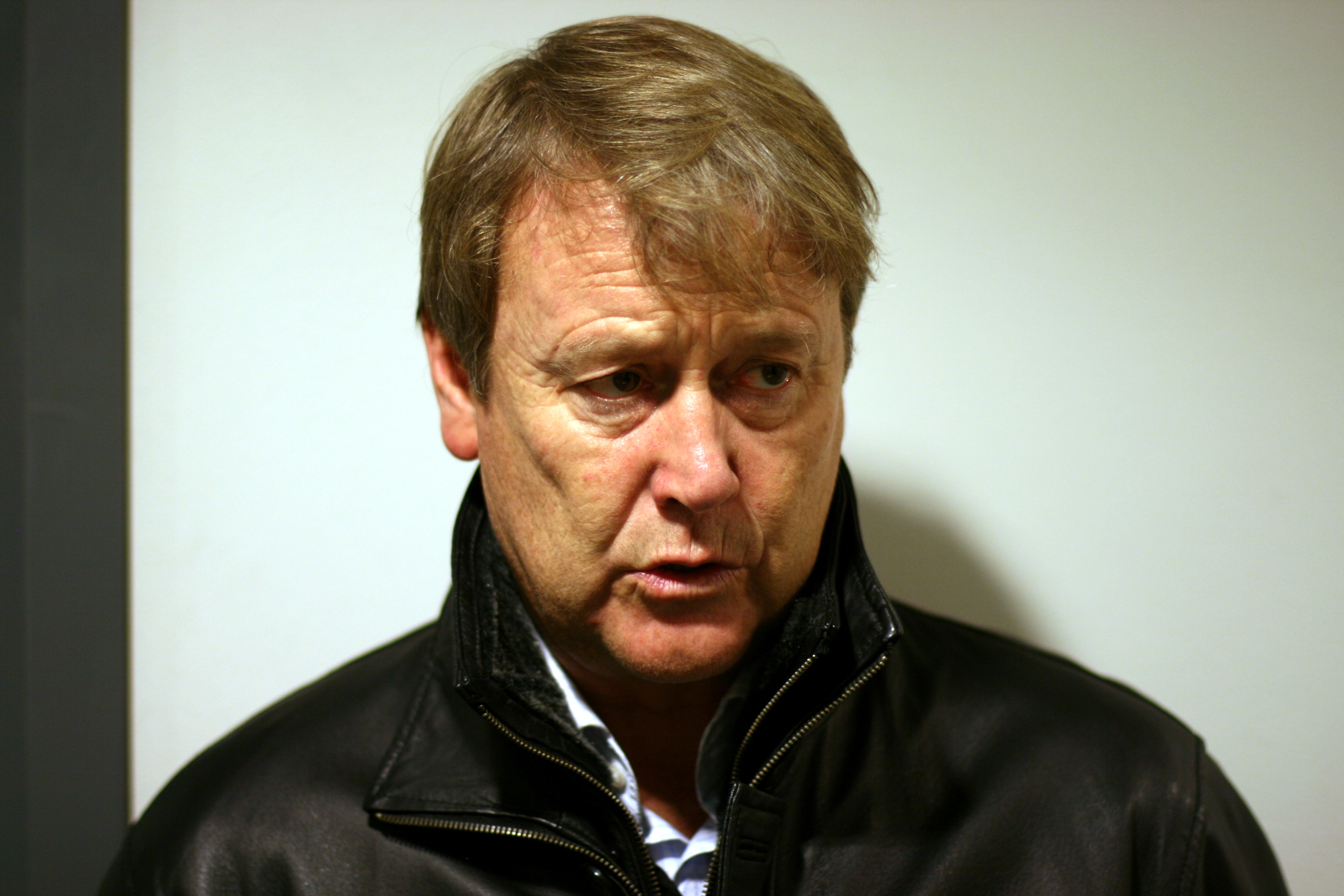
The 2014 season was Åge Hareide's first season with Malmö FF.

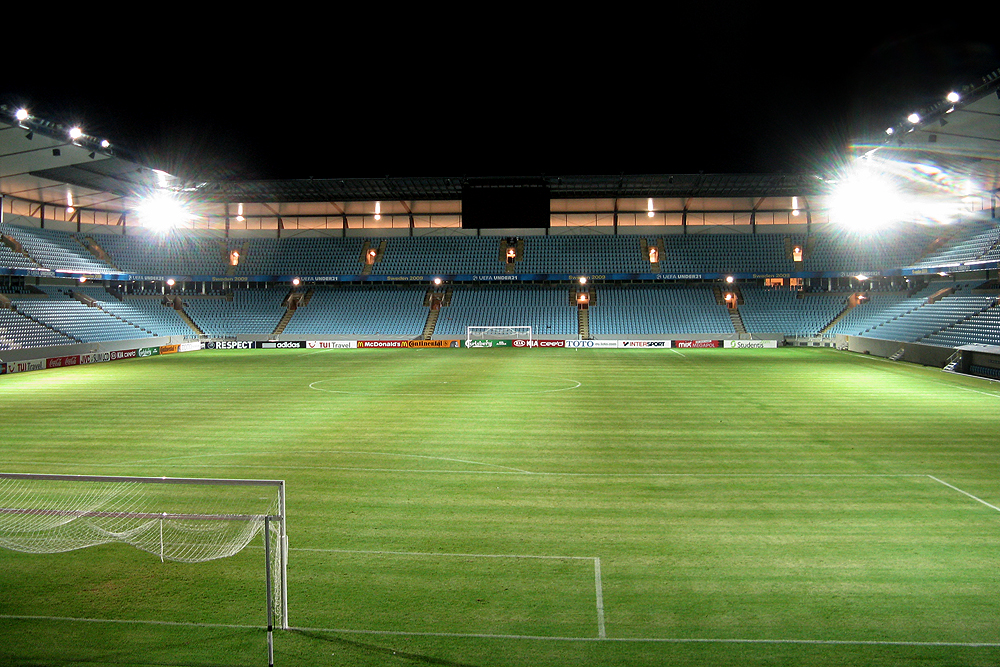
Swedbank Stadion was the third largest stadium in Allsvenskan during the 2014 season.

=== Coaching staff ===
Name	Role
(Norway) Åge Hareide	Head coach
(Sweden) Olof Persson	Assistant coach
(England) Ben Rosen	Fitness coach
(Sweden) Jonnie Fedel	Goalkeeping coach
(Sweden) Wilner Registre	Physiotherapist
(Sweden) Pär Herbertsson	Club doctor
(Sweden) Greger Andrijevski	Club masseur
(Sweden) Sverker Fryklund	Mental coach
(Sweden) Kenneth Folkesson	Equipment manager
(Sweden) Yksel Osmanovski	U21 coach
(Sweden) Mats Engqvist	Head coach youth academy
(Sweden) Staffan Tapper	Youth talent coach
(Sweden) Vito Stavljanin	Head scout

=== Other information ===
Chairman	(Sweden) Håkan Jeppsson
Managing director	(Sweden) Niclas Carlnén
Director of sports	(Sweden) Daniel Andersson
Ground (capacity and dimensions)	Swedbank Stadion (24,000 / 105x70 m)

Source: Malmö FF and Swedbank Stadion

== Competitions ==
=== Overall ===
Competition	Started round	Current position / round	Final position / round	First match	Last match
Allsvenskan	N/A	—	Winner	30 March 2014	1 November 2014
Svenska Cupen	Round 2	—	Semi-finals	21 August 2013	1 May 2014
Svenska Supercupen	Final	—	Winner	9 November 2014	
UEFA Champions League	Second qualifying round	—	Group stage	16 July 2014	9 December 2014

Source: Competitions

=== Allsvenskan ===
==== League table ====
Pos	Team	Pld	W	D	L	GF	GA	GD	Pts	Qualification or relegation
1	Malmö FF (C)	30	18	8	4	59	31	+28	62	Qualification to Champions League second qualifying round
2	IFK Göteborg	30	15	11	4	58	34	+24	56	Qualification to Europa League second qualifying round (Note: IFK Göteborg qualified for the UEFA Europa League second qualifying round by winning 2014–15 Svenska Cupen.)
3	AIK	30	15	7	8	59	42	+17	52	Qualification to Europa League first qualifying round (Note: IF Elfsborg qualified for the UEFA Europa League first qualifying round as the fourth-placed team since IFK Göteborg, winners of the 2014–15 Svenska Cupen, already qualified based on league position.)
4	IF Elfsborg	30	15	7	8	40	31	+9	52	Qualification to Europa League first qualifying round
5	BK Häcken	30	13	7	10	58	45	+13	46	

Source: svenskfotboll.se (in Swedish)
Rules for classification: 1) points; 2) goal difference; 3) number of goals scored; 4) head-to-head points; 5) head-to-head goal difference; 6) head-to-head away goals scored
(C) Champions

==== Results summary ====
Overall								Home						Away					
Pld	W	D	L	GF	GA	GD	Pts	W	D	L	GF	GA	GD	W	D	L	GF	GA	GD
30	18	8	4	59	31	+28	62	9	4	2	34	16	+18	9	4	2	25	15	+10

Source: svenskfotboll.se (in Swedish)

==== Results by round ====
Round	1	2	3	4	5	6	7	8	9	10	11	12	13	14	15	16	17	18	19	20	21	22	23	24	25	26	27	28	29	30
Ground	H	A	H	A	H	A	H	A	H	A	H	A	A	H	A	H	A	H	H	A	H	A	A	H	A	H	A	H	H	A
Result	W	W	W	W	D	W	L	W	W	W	D	W	D	W	D	W	W	D	W	D	W	L	D	D	W	W	W	L	W	L
Position	1	1	1	1	1	1	1	1	1	1	1	1	1	1	1	1	1	1	1	1	1	1	1	1	1	1	1	1	1	1

Source: see below
A = Away; H = Home; W = Win; D = Draw; L = Loss

==== Matches ====
Kickoff times are in UTC+2 unless stated otherwise.

30 March 2014 Round 1	Malmö FF	3–0	Falkenbergs FF	Malmö
17:30	Eriksson 74'; Thern 85', 90'	Report		Stadium: Swedbank Stadion; Attendance: 19,383; Referee: Markus Strömbergsson (Gävle)

7 April 2014 Round 2	IFK Göteborg	0–3	Malmö FF	Gothenburg
19:00		Report	Molins 8', 28'; Rosenberg 82'	Stadium: Gamla Ullevi; Attendance: 17,073; Referee: Michael Lerjéus (Skövde)

12 April 2014 Round 3	Malmö FF	1–0	Gefle IF	Malmö
16:00	Rosenberg 63'	Report		Stadium: Swedbank Stadion; Attendance: 11,338; Referee: Martin Hansson (Holmsjö)

16 April 2014 Round 4	Örebro SK	1–2	Malmö FF	Örebro
19:00	Yasin 76'	Report	Molins 32'; Jansson 63'	Stadium: Behrn Arena; Attendance: 8,125; Referee: Andreas Ekberg (Lund)

21 April 2014 Round 5	Malmö FF	2–2	Djurgårdens IF	Malmö
17:30	Molins 45'; Eriksson 47'	Report	Radetinac 15'; Fejzullahu 71'	Stadium: Swedbank Stadion; Attendance: 14,315; Referee: Bojan Pandžić (Gothenburg)

28 April 2014 Round 6	IFK Norrköping	1–2	Malmö FF	Norrköping
19:00	Kamara 80'	Report	Eriksson 47'; Forsberg 84'	Stadium: Idrottsparken; Attendance: 7,234; Referee: Stefan Johannesson (Täby)

4 May 2014 Round 7	Malmö FF	1–2	BK Häcken	Malmö
15:00	Halsti 67'	Report	El Kabir 3', 7'	Stadium: Swedbank Stadion; Attendance: 10,626; Referee: Markus Strömbergsson (Gävle)

8 May 2014 Round 8	Helsingborgs IF	0–1	Malmö FF	Helsingborg
20:00		Report	Molins 18' (pen.)	Stadium: Olympia; Attendance: 10,950; Referee: Jonas Eriksson (Sigtuna)

12 May 2014 Round 9	Malmö FF	3–1	Halmstads BK	Malmö
19:00	Rosenberg 10'; Cibicki 90'; Molins 90+2'	Report	Magyar 90+4'	Stadium: Swedbank Stadion; Attendance: 11,219; Referee: Mohammed Al-Hakim (Köping)

22 May 2014 Round 10	Mjällby AIF	0–1	Malmö FF	Hällevik
19:00		Report	Molins 39'	Stadium: Strandvallen; Attendance: 5,511; Referee: Markus Strömbergsson (Gävle)

26 May 2014 Round 11	Malmö FF	2–2	AIK	Malmö
19:05	Molins 63'; Cibicki 90+4'	Report	Markkanen 45'; Quaison 59'	Stadium: Swedbank Stadion; Attendance: 17,382; Referee: Stefan Johannesson (Täby)

1 June 2014 Round 12	IF Elfsborg	0–1	Malmö FF	Borås
17:30		Report	Rosenberg 43'	Stadium: Borås Arena; Attendance: 11,641; Referee: Martin Hansson (Holmsjö)

6 July 2014 Round 13	IF Brommapojkarna	1–1	Malmö FF	Stockholm
17:30	Karlström 39'	Report	Rosenberg 15'	Stadium: Grimsta IP; Attendance: 2,037; Referee: Johan Hamlin (Bro)

12 July 2014 Round 14	Malmö FF	3–0	Åtvidabergs FF	Malmö
17:30	Forsberg 14', 28', 48'	Report		Stadium: Swedbank Stadion; Attendance: 9,336; Referee: Stefan Johannesson (Täby)

19 July 2014 Round 15	Kalmar FF	1–1	Malmö FF	Kalmar
16:00	Söderqvist 21'	Report	Kiese Thelin 11'	Stadium: Guldfågeln Arena; Attendance: 11,911; Referee: Markus Strömbergsson (Gävle)

26 July 2014 Round 16	Malmö FF	3–1	Kalmar FF	Malmö
16:00	Forsberg 47'; Ramhorn 53' (o.g.); Rosenberg 63'	Report	Andersson 12'	Stadium: Swedbank Stadion; Attendance: 13,511; Referee: Martin Hansson (Holmsjö)

2 August 2014 Round 17	Falkenbergs FF	2–5	Malmö FF	Falkenberg
16:00	Donyoh 13'; Vall 89'	Report	Mehmeti 24', 38'; Rosenberg 67'; Forsberg 73'; Eriksson 83'	Stadium: Falkenbergs IP; Attendance: 5,221; Referee: Johan Hamlin (Bro)

10 August 2014 Round 18	Malmö FF	2–2	IFK Göteborg	Malmö
17:30	Rosenberg 27'; Forsberg 83'	Report	Vibe 70'; Engvall 85'	Stadium: Swedbank Stadion; Attendance: 18,838; Referee: Markus Strömbergsson (Gävle)

13 August 2014 Round 19	Malmö FF	3–2	Örebro SK	Malmö
19:00	Rosenberg 60' (pen.), 89'; Kiese Thelin 74'	Report	Kamara 12', 19'	Stadium: Swedbank Stadion; Attendance: 12,264; Referee: Andreas Ekberg (Lund)

16 August 2014 Round 20	Gefle IF	0–0	Malmö FF	Gävle
16:00		Report		Stadium: Strömvallen; Attendance: 4,211; Referee: Stefan Johannesson (Täby)

23 August 2014 Round 21	Malmö FF	3–0	IFK Norrköping	Malmö
16:00	Forsberg 65'; Kiese Thelin 67'; Helander 86'	Report		Stadium: Swedbank Stadion; Attendance: 11,205; Referee: Bojan Pandžić (Gothenburg)

31 August 2014 Round 22	Djurgårdens IF	2–0	Malmö FF	Stockholm
17:30	Radetinac 10'; Andersson 36'	Report		Stadium: Tele2 Arena; Attendance: 24,529; Referee: Jonas Eriksson (Sigtuna)

13 September 2014 Round 23	BK Häcken	3–3	Malmö FF	Gothenburg
13:00	Gustafson 5'; Þorvaldsson 18'; Gustafson 28'	Report	Forsberg 11', 53'; Kiese Thelin 56'	Stadium: Gamla Ullevi; Attendance: 2,862; Referee: Martin Strömbergsson (Gävle)

21 September 2014 Round 24	Malmö FF	1–1	Helsingborgs IF	Malmö
17:30	Rosenberg 85'	Report	Dahlberg 87'	Stadium: Swedbank Stadion; Attendance: 20,310; Referee: Jonas Eriksson (Sigtuna)

24 September 2014 Round 25	Halmstads BK	0–1	Malmö FF	Halmstad
19:00		Report	Cibicki 16'	Stadium: Örjans Vall; Attendance: 5,046; Referee: Michael Lerjéus (Skövde)

27 September 2014 Round 26	Malmö FF	4–1	Mjällby AIF	Malmö
13:00	Forsberg 45', 70', 90'; Rosenberg 64'	Report	Blomqvist 39'	Stadium: Swedbank Stadion; Attendance: 12,126; Referee: Andreas Ekberg (Lund)

5 October 2014 Round 27	AIK	2–3	Malmö FF	Solna
17:30	Bahoui 67', 85'	Report	Kiese Thelin 39'; Eriksson 51'; Rosenberg 86'	Stadium: Friends Arena; Attendance: 23,247; Referee: Jonas Eriksson (Sigtuna)

18 October 2014 Round 28	Malmö FF	1–2	IF Elfsborg	Malmö
13:00	Rosenberg 1'	Report	Larsson 66', 79'	Stadium: Swedbank Stadion; Attendance: 16,122; Referee: Stefan Johannesson (Täby)

27 October 2014 Round 29	Malmö FF	2–0	IF Brommapojkarna	Malmö
19:00	Forsberg 12'; Rosenberg 77'	Report		Stadium: Swedbank Stadion; Attendance: 13,382; Referee: Martin Hansson (Holmsjö)

1 November 2014 Round 30	Åtvidabergs FF	2–1	Malmö FF	Åtvidaberg
13:00	Santos 42'; Bergström 66'	Report	Tinnerholm 31'	Stadium: Kopparvallen; Attendance: 4,125; Referee: Bojan Pandžić (Gothenburg)

=== Svenska Cupen ===
==== 2013–14 ====
The tournament continued from the 2013 season.

Kickoff times are in UTC+1 unless stated otherwise.

===== Group stage =====
Pos	Team	Pld	W	D	L	GF	GA	GD	Pts	Qualification	MFF	HAM	ÄFF	DEG
1	Malmö FF	3	3	0	0	13	3	+10	9	Advance to Knockout stage	—	3–2	—	7–1
2	Hammarby IF	3	1	1	1	5	4	+1	4		—	—	0–0	—
3	Ängelholms FF	3	1	1	1	3	3	0	4		0–3	—	—	—
4	Degerfors IF	3	0	0	3	2	13	−11	0		—	1–3	0–3	—

1 March 2014 Matchday 1	Malmö FF	7–1	Degerfors IF	Malmö
13:00	Kroon 3', 6', 67'; Molins 39', 40'; Eriksson 58'; Forsberg 80'	Report	Samuelsson 18'	Stadium: Malmö IP; Attendance: 3,321; Referee: Robert Daradić (Helsingborg)

8 March 2014 Matchday 2	Ängelholms FF	0–3	Malmö FF	Malmö
13:00		Report	Molins 33', 54'; Kroon 42'	Stadium: Malmö IP (Match was moved since Ängelholms IP wasn't approved for play, Ängelholms FF were designated as the home team of the fixture.); Attendance: 2,678; Referee: Kristoffer Karlsson (Helsingborg)

15 March 2014 Matchday 3	Malmö FF	3–2	Hammarby IF	Malmö
15:30	Forsberg 10'; Rosenberg 25'; Molins 50' (pen.)	Report	Haddad 75'; Fuhre 89'	Stadium: Malmö Stadion; Attendance: 8,276; Referee: Robert Daradić (Helsingborg)

===== Knockout stage =====
22 March 2014 Quarter-finals	Malmö FF	2–0	IF Brommapojkarna	Malmö
15:00	Helander 59'; Kroon 86'	Report		Stadium: Swedbank Stadion; Attendance: 3,442; Referee: Andreas Ekberg (Lund)

1 May 2014 Semi-finals	Malmö FF	0–2	Helsingborgs IF	Malmö
15:00 UTC+2		Report	Uronen 27'; Accam 90'	Stadium: Swedbank Stadion; Attendance: 8,540; Referee: Martin Hansson (Holmsjö)

==== 2014–15 ====
The tournament continued into the 2015 season.

===== Qualification stage =====
15 November 2014 Round 2	IS Halmia	1–2 (a.e.t.)	Malmö FF	Halmstad
14:00 UTC+1	Taube 49'	Report	Adu 75'; Rosenberg 102' (pen.)	Stadium: Örjans Vall; Attendance: 1,618; Referee: Jonas Karlsson (Målilla)

=== Svenska Supercupen ===
9 November 2014 Final	Malmö FF	2–2 (a.e.t.) (5–4 p)	IF Elfsborg	Malmö
18:15 UTC+1	Kiese Thelin 89'; Forsberg 114'	Report	Claesson 22'; Prodell 124' (pen.)	Stadium: Malmö Stadion; Attendance: 1,266; Referee: Martin Strömbergsson (Gävle)
	Penalties
	Tinnerholm (penalty scored); Forsberg (penalty scored); Kroon (penalty scored); Cibicki (penalty missed); Kiese Thelin (penalty scored); Rakip (penalty scored)		(penalty scored) Frick; (penalty scored) Prodell; (penalty scored) Rohdén; (penalty scored) Larsson; (penalty missed) Hedlund; (penalty missed) Beckmann

=== UEFA Champions League ===
==== Qualifying phase and play-off round ====
Kickoff times are in UTC+2 unless stated otherwise.

===== Second qualifying round =====
16 July 2014 First Leg	Malmö FF (Sweden)	0–0	(Latvia) Ventspils	Malmö, Sweden
19:00		Report		Stadium: Swedbank Stadion; Attendance: 8,831; Referee: Antti Munukka (Finland)

23 July 2014 Second Leg	Ventspils (Latvia)	0–1 (0–1 agg.)	(Sweden) Malmö FF	Ventspils, Latvia
19:00 UTC+3		Report	Kiese Thelin 19'	Stadium: Ventspils Olimpiskais Stadions; Attendance: 3,000; Referee: Kristo Tohver (Estonia)

===== Third qualifying round =====
29 July 2014 First Leg	Sparta Prague (Czech Republic)	4–2	(Sweden) Malmö FF	Prague, Czech Republic
19:30	Lafata 22', 51', 70'; Kováč 52'	Report	Forsberg 17'; Kiese Thelin 27'	Stadium: Generali Arena; Attendance: 12,833; Referee: Halis Özkahya (Turkey)

6 August 2014 Second Leg	Malmö FF (Sweden)	2–0 (a 4–4 agg.)	(Czech Republic) Sparta Prague	Malmö, Sweden
19:00	Rosenberg 35', 55'	Report		Stadium: Swedbank Stadion; Attendance: 19,322; Referee: Ruddy Buquet (France)

===== Play-off round =====
19 August 2014 First Leg	Red Bull Salzburg (Austria)	2–1	(Sweden) Malmö FF	Wals-Siezenheim, Austria
20:45	Schiemer 16'; Soriano 54'	Report	Forsberg 90'	Stadium: Red Bull Arena; Attendance: 29,110; Referee: Nicola Rizzoli (Italy)

27 August 2014 Second Leg	Malmö FF (Sweden)	3–0 (4–2 agg.)	(Austria) Red Bull Salzburg	Malmö, Sweden
20:45	Rosenberg 11' (pen.), 84'; Eriksson 19'	Report		Stadium: Swedbank Stadion; Attendance: 20,361; Referee: Damir Skomina (Slovenia)

==== Group stage ====
Times up to 25 October 2014 (matchdays 1–3) are CEST (UTC+2), thereafter (matchdays 4–6) times are CET (UTC+1).

Pos	Team	Pld	W	D	L	GF	GA	GD	Pts	Qualification	ATM	JUV	OLY	MAL
1	(Spain) Atlético Madrid	6	4	1	1	14	3	+11	13	Advance to knockout phase	—	1–0	4–0	5–0
2	(Italy) Juventus	6	3	1	2	7	4	+3	10	Advance to knockout phase	0–0	—	3–2	2–0
3	(Greece) Olympiacos	6	3	0	3	10	13	−3	9	Transfer to Europa League	3–2	1–0	—	4–2
4	(Sweden) Malmö FF	6	1	0	5	4	15	−11	3		0–2	0–2	2–0	—

Source: UEFA
Rules for classification: Group stage tiebreakers

16 September 2014 Matchday 1	Juventus (Italy)	2–0	(Sweden) Malmö FF	Turin, Italy
20:45	Tevez 59', 90'	Report		Stadium: Juventus Stadium; Attendance: 31,218; Referee: Szymon Marciniak (Poland)

1 October 2014 Matchday 2	Malmö FF (Sweden)	2–0	(Greece) Olympiacos	Malmö, Sweden
20:45	Rosenberg 42', 82'	Report		Stadium: Swedbank Stadion; Attendance: 20,500; Referee: Sergei Karasev (Russia)

22 October 2014 Matchday 3	Atlético Madrid (Spain)	5–0	(Sweden) Malmö FF	Madrid, Spain
20:45	Koke 48'; Mandžukić 61'; Griezmann 63'; Godín 87'; Cerci 90+3'	Report		Stadium: Vicente Calderón Stadium; Attendance: 34,502; Referee: Matej Jug (Slovenia)

4 November 2014 Matchday 4	Malmö FF (Sweden)	0–2	(Spain) Atlético Madrid	Malmö, Sweden
20:45		Report	Koke 30'; García 78'	Stadium: Swedbank Stadion; Attendance: 20,500; Referee: Mark Clattenburg (England)

26 November 2014 Matchday 5	Malmö FF (Sweden)	0–2	(Italy) Juventus	Malmö, Sweden
20:45		Report	Llorente 49'; Tevez 88'	Stadium: Swedbank Stadion; Attendance: 20,500; Referee: Pedro Proença (Portugal)

9 December 2014 Matchday 6	Olympiacos (Greece)	4–2	(Sweden) Malmö FF	Piraeus, Greece
20:45	Fuster 22'; Domínguez 63'; Mitroglou 87'; Afellay 90'	Report	Kroon 59'; Rosenberg 81'	Stadium: Karaiskakis Stadium; Attendance: 27,562; Referee: Stéphane Lannoy (France)

== Non competitive ==
=== Pre-season ===
Kickoff times are in UTC+1 unless stated otherwise.

31 January 2014 Friendly	New England Revolution (United States)	1–1	(Sweden) Malmö FF	Bradenton, Florida, United States
19:00 UTC−5	Rowe 5'	Report	Forsberg 36'	Stadium: IMG Academy

5 February 2014 Friendly	Columbus Crew (United States)	1–0	(Sweden) Malmö FF	Bradenton, Florida, United States
15:30 UTC−5	Arrieta 50'	Report		Stadium: IMG Academy

18 February 2014 Friendly	Malmö FF (Sweden)	0–0	(Denmark) FC Nordsjælland	Malmö, Sweden
14:00		Report		Stadium: Malmö IP; Attendance: 3,021; Referee: Robert Daradić (Helsingborg)

24 February 2014 Friendly	Malmö FF	2–1	Mjällby AIF	Malmö, Sweden
15:00	Forsberg 65', 67'	Report	Haynes 85' (pen.)	Stadium: Malmö IP; Attendance: 1,557; Referee: Kristoffer Karlsson (Helsingborg)

=== Mid-season ===
Kickoff times are in UTC+2 unless stated otherwise.

18 June 2014 Friendly	FC Höllviken	0–3	Malmö FF	Höllviken, Sweden
17:30		Report	Ndiaye 19'; Cibicki 79'; Kroon 89'	Stadium: Höllvikens IP; Attendance: 1,266

27 June 2014 Friendly	Partizan (Serbia)	3–3	(Sweden) Malmö FF	Belgrade, Serbia
20:45	Pantić 36'; Vulićević 50'; Ilić 90+2' (pen.)	Report	Rosenberg 3'; Molins 6'; Ostojić 24' (o.g.)	Stadium: Partizan Stadium; Attendance: 3,000; Referee: Milenko Vukadinovic (Serbia)

=== Post-season ===
20 November 2014 Friendly	Malmö FF (Sweden)	4–0	(Finland) HJK	Malmö, Sweden
15:00 UTC+1	Forsberg 26'; Cibicki 42'; Ricardinho 45'; Fadi 70'	Report		Stadium: Malmö Stadion; Attendance: 1,266; Referee: Kristoffer Karlsson (Höganäs)
