= Pa Konate =

Guinean footballer (born 1994)

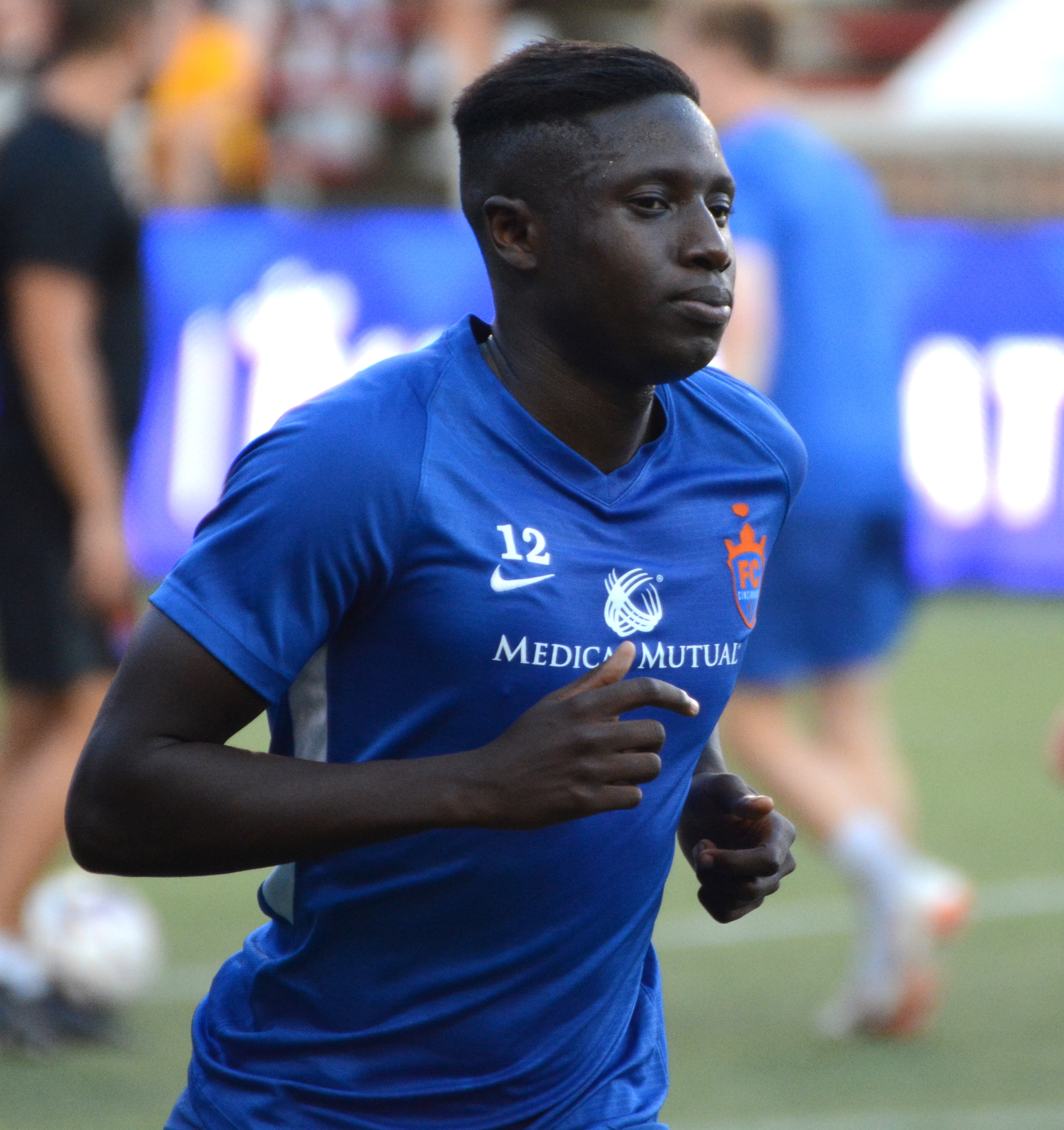
- Konate with Cincinnati in 2018

Personal information
- Full name: Pa Momodou Konate
- Date of birth: 25 April 1994 (age 32)
- Place of birth: Malmö, Sweden
- Height: 1.78 m (5 ft 10 in)
- Position: Left-back

Team information
- Current team: KuPS
- Number: 22

Youth career
- 1999–2012: Malmö FF

Senior career*
Years	Team	Apps	(Gls)
2013–2017	Malmö FF	56	(0)
2014	→ Östers IF (loan)	15	(0)
2017–2019	SPAL	0	(0)
2018	→ FC Cincinnati (loan)	5	(0)
2019	GIF Sundsvall	25	(1)
2020	Jönköping Södra	9	(1)
2020	Rosenborg	11	(1)
2021–2023	Botev Plovdiv	66	(7)
2023–2024	Nea Salamis	19	(0)
2024–2025	Spartak Varna	29	(0)
2025–	KuPS	6	(0)

International career^{‡}
2013–2017	Sweden U21/O	18	(0)
2016–2017	Sweden	3	(0)
2019–2022	Guinea	8	(0)
Medal record
Men's football
Representing Sweden
UEFA European Under-21 Championship
Winner	2015 Czech Republic
- * Club domestic league appearances and goals as of 19 November 2025 ‡ National team caps and goals as of 4 May 2023

Pa Momodou Konate (born 25 April 1994) is a professional footballer who plays as a left back for Veikkausliiga club KuPS. Born in Sweden, he represents the Guinea national team.

== Club career ==
=== Malmö FF ===
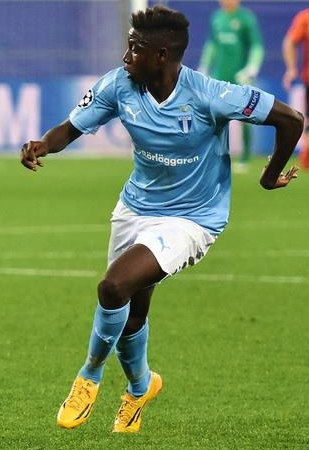
Konate playing for Malmö FF in the UEFA Champions League match against Shakhtar Donetsk.

Born in Malmö, Sweden, Konate began his football career at Malmö FF joining the club when he was five years old and lived in a few hundred meters from Swedbank Stadion. Konate then progressed through the youth system. He then played for the club's U19 and U21 side between 2011 and 2012. On 23 November 2012, Konate signed a first team contract on a youth basis with Malmö FF.

Konate then appeared three times as an unused substitute in the club's matches in the Svenska Cupen. He made his Allsvenskan debut for Malmö FF in an away fixture against AIK at Friends Arena on 17 April 2013, coming on as an 85th-minute substitute, as the club won 2–0. A week later on 3 May 2013, Konate made his first start for Malmö FF and played 62 minutes before being substituted, as the club drew 1–1 against IFK Norrköping. He then helped set up one of Malmö FF's goals against Sävedalens in the Round 2 of Svenska Cupen, in a 6–0 win. Konate played a total of six matches during his debut season for the club, most of these matches was as an oncoming substitute, coming on for Ricardinho. His contributions saw Malmö FF win the league after beating IF Elfsborg 2–0 on 28 October 2013.

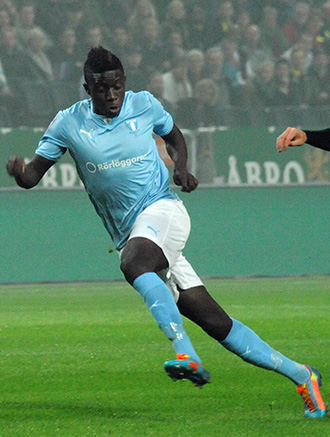
Konate playing for Malmö FF in 2014.

After returning to the club halfway through the 2014 season, Konate made his first appearance for Malmö FF, coming against Kalmar on 26 July 2014, starting a match before being substituted at half time, as the club won 3–1. Following his return, he competed for a spot in the starting line-up against regular Ricardinho. Konate's breakthrough came when he was selected to start in the deciding qualifying game against Red Bull Salzburg on 27 August 2014 in which Malmö FF qualified for the group stage of the 2014–15 UEFA Champions League. Konate made three more UEFA Champions League appearances, as the club were eliminated in the Group Stage. His contributions saw Malmö FF win the league once again after the club beat AIK 3–2 on 5 October 2014. At the end of the 2014 season, he went on to make 11 appearances in all competitions.

However, at the start of the 2015 season, Konate found his first team place limited and was placed on the substitute bench, due to Yoshimar Yotún being Malmö FF's first choice left–back position. It wasn't until on 11 May 2015 when he made his first appearance of the season, coming on as a late substitute, in a 2–2 draw against IF Elfsborg. Following the absence of Yotún due to his international commitment, Konate made three more starts between 3 June 2015 and 4 July 2015. Following the return of Yotún, he was demoted back to the substitute bench for the next three months and only made two appearances around that time. After Yotún moved to the left–midfield position, Konate began to receive a handful of first team football, playing in the left–back position for the rest of the 2015 season. He later said that his first team run ins gave him confidence. At the end of the 2015 season, Konate went on to make twenty–four appearances in all competitions.

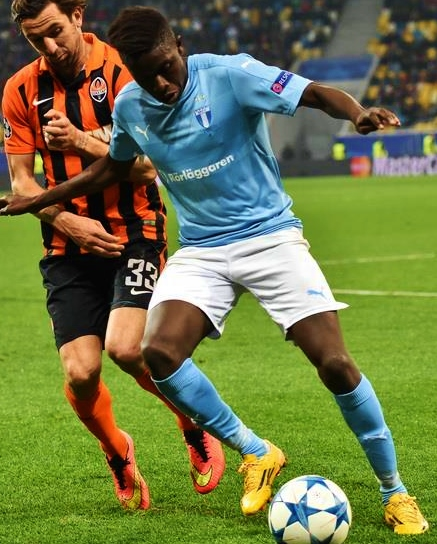
Konate on the ball, as he tries to fend off the ball from Darijo Srna in Malmö FF's UEFA Champions League match against Shakhtar Donetsk.

Having been placed on the substitute bench at the start of the 2016 season, Konate made his first appearance of the season against IF Elfsborg on 18 April 2016, starting the whole game, and helped Malmö FF keep a clean sheet, in a 1–0 win. This was followed up by helping the club keep three more consecutive clean sheets against Djurgårdens IF, IFK Göteborg and BK Häcken. However, in Svenska Cupen Final against BK Häcken, he started the whole game, as the club lost 6–5 in a penalty shoot–out following a 2–2 draw. Since returning to the first team, Konate regained his first team place, playing in the left–back position for the next two months. This lasted until he was called up to the Sweden Olympic squad for the Summer Olympics. After the tournament ended, Konate made his return to the first team, coming on as a 58th-minute substitute, in a 4–1 win against Jönköping Södra on 22 August 2016. Following his return, however, he lost his first team place by new signing, Behrang Safari and found his playing time, mostly coming from the substitute bench. Despite this, Konate's contributions saw Malmö FF win the league once again after the club beat Falkenberg 3–0 on 26 October 2016. He later reflected on the season, saying: "I have had a good season and received much more matches and more confidence from Allan Kuhn. I did well when I got the chance. Then it is clear that you want to play all matches, but that is in football. It has been a good season." At the end of the 2016 season, Konate went on to make twenty–four appearances in all competitions.

Ahead of the 2017 season, Konate was linked with a move away from Malmö FF, with European clubs, such as, Bordeaux and Serie A clubs. At the start of the 2017 season, he appeared seven times for the club, making three starts. This lasted until Konate suffered a hamstring injury in the 27th minute during a match against IF Elfsborg and was substituted, as Malmö FF won 2–1 on 8 May 2017. After the match, it was announced that he would be out for two months. By late–June, Konate recovered from the injury and returned to training. It wasn't until on 8 July 2017 when he returned to the starting line–up against BK Häcken and played 81 minutes before being substituted, as the club won 1–0, in what turned out to be his last appearance for Malmö FF. By the time Konate departed from the club, he made nine appearances in all competitions. Despite his departure, his contributions helped Malmö FF win the league.

==== Loan to Östers IF ====
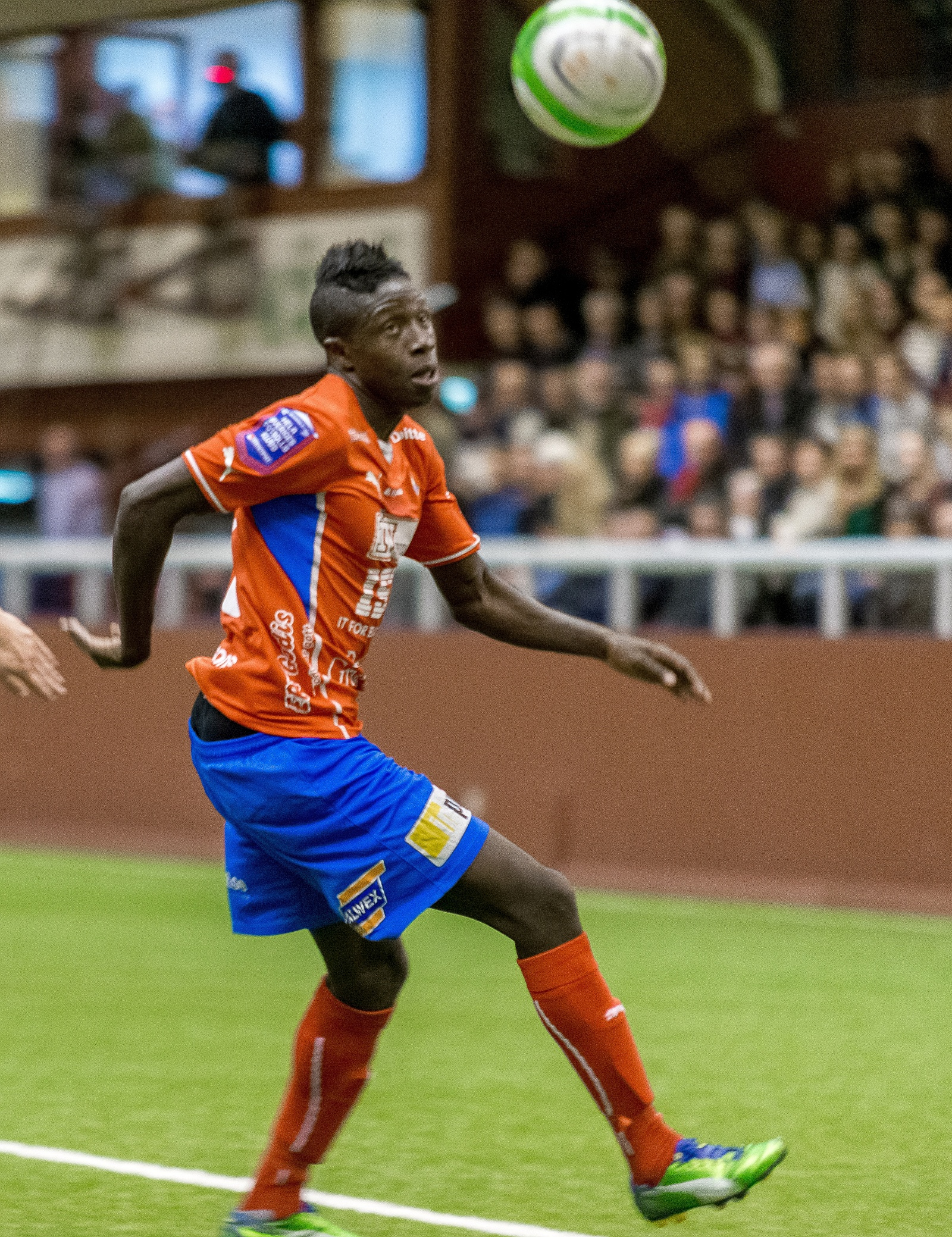
Konate playing for Östers IF in 2014.

Having been linked a move to Landskrona BoIS, Konate opted to go on loan to newly relegated Superettan side Östers IF for the duration of the 2014 season with an option to return to Malmö FF in the summer of 2014. At the same time he renewed his contract with Malmö FF for an additional four years.

Konate made his debut for the club, starting the whole game, in a 1–1 draw against Rynninge in the Svenska Cupen. In a follow–up match, he set up one of the goals for Östers IF, in a 5–2 win against Östersund in another Svenska Cupen. Since joining the club, Konate quickly established himself in the left–back position, which saw him make 15 league appearances for Öster. This lasted until he was recalled to Malmö FF in the summer of 2014 to cover up for Miiko Albornoz and Mahmut Özen, two defenders that had left the club during the summer transfer window.

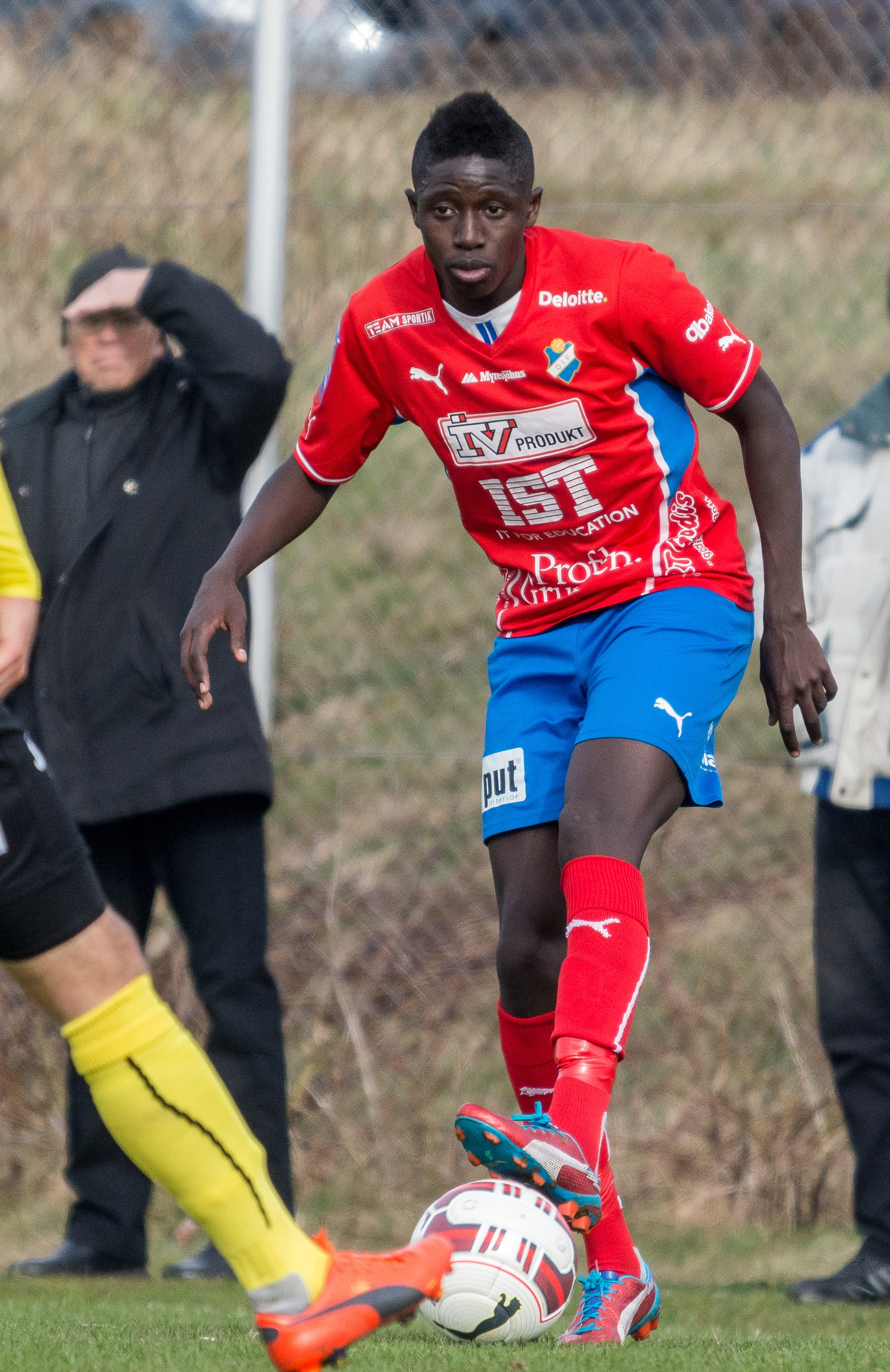
Konate playing for Östers IF in 2014.

=== S.P.A.L. ===
Konate signed for newly promoted Serie A side SPAL in the summer of 2017, signing a three–year contract with the club.

However, his start to his SPAL's career suffered a setback when he found himself behind the pecking order in the club's defence. Even worst is that Konate suffered a foot injury that kept him out for two months. Despite this, he went on to make two appearances for SPAL.

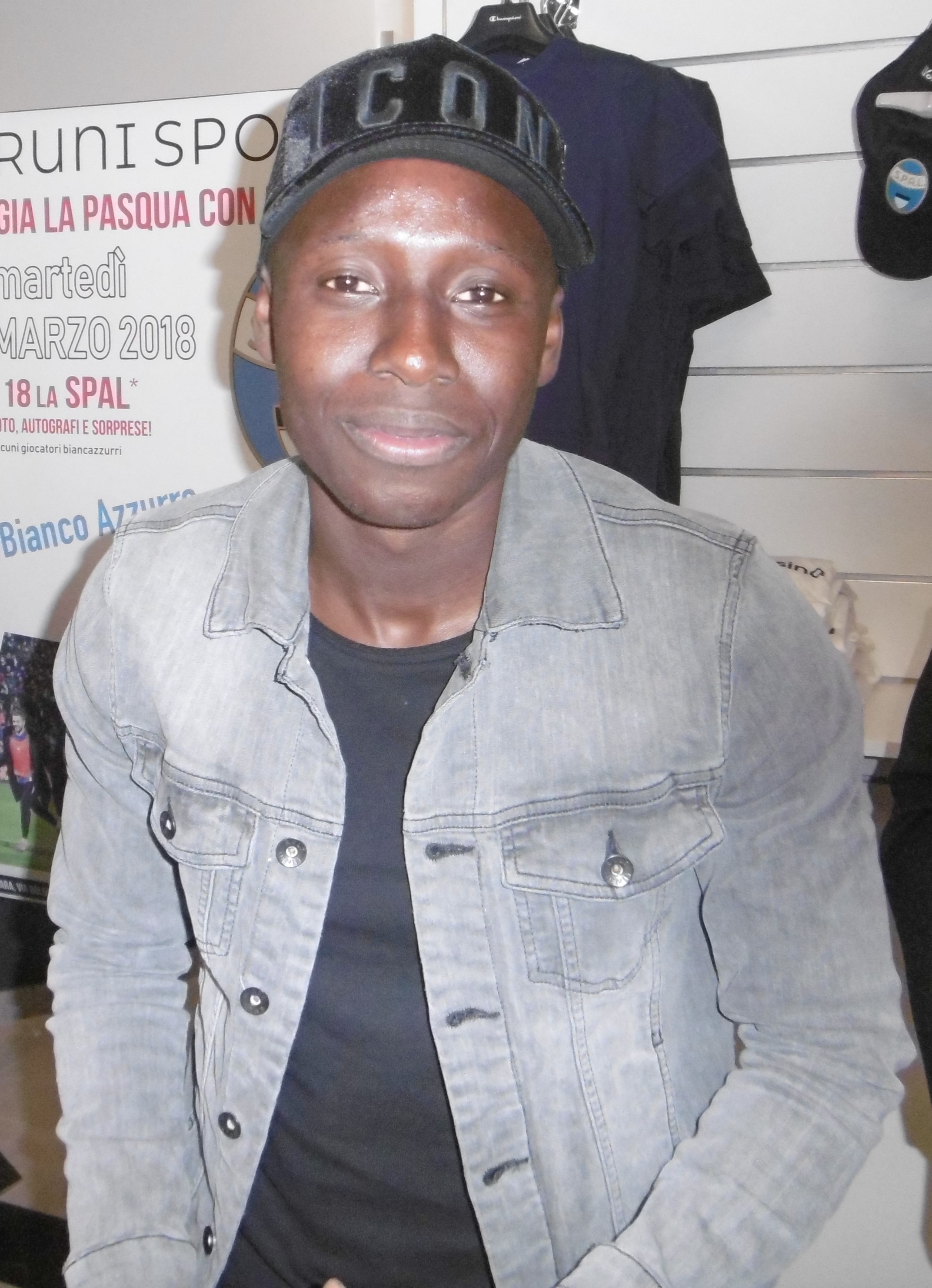
Konate pictured at SPAL's event in March 2018.

==== Loan to FC Cincinnati ====
It was announced on 31 July 2018 that Konate signed for FC Cincinnati on loan for the 2018 season.

He made his debut for the club, starting a match and played 61 minutes before being substituted, in a 5–1 win against Atlanta United 2 on 23 August 2018. In a follow–up match, Konate set up one of the goals for FC Cincinnati, as the club won 2–1 against Tampa Bay Rowdies. At the end of the 2018 season, he went on to make five appearances for FC Cincinnati. Following this, Konate returned to his parent club.

=== GIF Sundsvall ===
On 27 February 2019, Konate returned to Sweden to sign for GIF Sundsvall for the rest of the 2019 season.

He made his debut for the club, starting the whole game in the left–midfield position, and set up a goal for Maic Sema, in a 3–1 loss against IF Elfsborg on 14 April 2019. Since joining GIF Sundsvall, Konate quickly established himself in the starting eleven, rotating in either the left–midfield position or left–back position. It wasn't until on 29 May 2019 when he scored his first Allsvenskan goal, coming against his former club, Malmö FF, in a 2–1 loss. This was followed up by setting up the club's opening goal of the game, in a 1–1 draw against Östersund. However, Konate was unable to help GIF Sundsvall avoid relegation, as the club finished nineteenth place in the league. Following this, however, he suffered an injury in the 18th minute against Helsingborg on 26 October 2019 and was substituted as a result, as GIF Sundsvall lost 2–1. At the end of the 2019 season, Konate went on to make twenty–six appearances and scoring once in all competitions. Following this, he was released by the club after his contract expired.

=== Jönköpings Södra ===
On 15 July 2020, Konate signed for the Superettan side Jönköping Södra.

He made his debut for the club, starting the whole game and setting up Jönköping Södra's second goal of the game, in a 2–0 win against IK Brage on 25 July 2020. Since joining the club, Konate made nine starts for the side, playing in the left–midfield position. It wasn't until on 5 September 2020 when he scored his first goal for Jönköping Södra, in a 3–0 win against AFC Eskilstuna, in what turned out to be his last appearance for the club.

=== Rosenborg ===
On 9 September 2020, Konate signed a short-term contract with Eliteserien side Rosenborg for the remainder of the season.

He made his debut for the club, starting the whole game in the left–back position, in a 2–1 win against FK Haugesund on 20 September 2020. Since joining Rosenberg, Konate quickly established himself in the starting eleven, playing in the left–back position. It wasn't until on 25 October 2020 when he scored his first goal for the club, in a 2–1 win against Sarpsborg 08. At the end of the 2020 season, Konate went on to make thirteen appearances and scoring once in all competitions. Following this, he was released by Rosenberg on 29 December 2020 when his contract expired at the end of the 2020 season.

== International career ==
Konate was born in Sweden to a Guinean father and Gambian mother, making him eligible to play for Sweden, Guinea and Gambia.

=== Sweden ===
He originally represented Sweden as a youth and senior international. In May 2013, Konate was called up to the Sweden U21 squad for the first time. It wasn't until on 11 June 2013 when he made his debut for the U21 national team, coming on as a 67th-minute substitute, in a 3–1 win against Cuba U21. Konate later made two more appearances for Sweden U21 by the end of the year. It wasn't until on 14 October 2014 when he made his first appearance for the U21 national team in eleven months, in a 4–1 win against France U21 to qualify for the UEFA European Under-21 Championship. Konate was then called up to the Sweden U21 squad for the UEFA European Under-21 Championship in May 2015. However, he made no appearances for the U21 national team throughout the tournament, as Sweden U21 won the final by beating Portugal U21 on penalties. It wasn't until on 8 September 2015 when Konate made his first appearance for Sweden U21 in three months, coming on as a 63rd-minute substitute, in a 0–0 draw against Poland U21. He then made his first U21 national team appearance in nine months, starting the whole game against Georgia U21 on 3 June 2016 and set up one of the goals for Sweden U21, as they won 3–2. Konate later made five more starts, playing in the left–back position for the next seven months. Following this, he was dropped from the U21 national team squad ahead of the UEFA European Under-21 Championship. Despite this, Konate went on to make fifteen appearances for Sweden U21.

In December 2015, Konate was called up to the Sweden squad for the first time. He made his senior team debut, coming on as a second-half substitute, in a 1–1 draw against Estonia on 6 January 2016. This was followed up making his first start for Sweden, playing 45 minutes before being substituted at half time, in a 3–0 win against Finland. In December 2016, Konate was called up to the senior team once again. He made his first appearance for Sweden, starting a match and played 45 minutes before being substituted at half time, in a 2–1 loss against Ivory Coast on 8 January 2017, in what turned out to be his last appearance for the national side. By the time Konate switched allegiance, he made three appearances for Sweden.

In July 2016, Konate was called up to the Sweden Olympic squad for the first time. He made his Sweden Olympic debut, starting the whole game, in a 3–2 loss against South Korea on 29 July 2016. Konate later played all three matches, as the Olympic team were eliminated from the group stage. Despite being on the losing side, he later reflected on the tournament, saying: "The Olympics were a very useful experience. Do not talk about anything else. It is never wrong to play international matches and international matches. The results did not go our way, but for my own part I try to take the game with me, Pa points out."

=== Guinea ===
Konate decided that he switch to represent the Guinea national football team in October 2019, having previously been keen to do so. Konate made his debut in a friendly match, starting a match and played 77 minutes before being substituted, in a 3–2 loss to Chile on 15 October 2019.

== Personal life ==
In May 2013, Konate revealed that he began studying for Trade and Administration program at Borgarskolan. While growing up, Konate was a ball boy as he was progressing through the youth system at Malmö FF.

Konate said he credited his mother for being supportive of his football career, saying: "My mother is incredibly important to me. I would not have played here in MFF if it were not for her. She has supported me all the way, no matter how it went on the pitch and off the field. She always backs me up." Konate also credited his mother for helping him become academic during his school years.

== Career statistics ==
As of 17 August 2025

Club	Season	League			National cup		Continental		Total	
Club	Season	Division	Apps	Goals	Apps	Goals	Apps	Goals	Apps	Goals
Malmö FF	2013	Allsvenskan	6	0	1	0	0	0	7	0
Malmö FF	2014	Allsvenskan	11	0	1	0	4	0	16	0
Malmö FF	2015	Allsvenskan	10	0	1	0	3	0	14	0
Malmö FF	2016	Allsvenskan	22	0	2	0	—		24	0
Malmö FF	2017	Allsvenskan	7	0	0	0	2	0	9	0
Malmö FF	Total		62	0	6	0	9	0	77	0
Öster (loan)	2014	Superettan	15	0	3	0	—		18	0
SPAL	2017–18	Serie A	0	0	2	0	—		2	0
FC Cincinnati (loan)	2018	USL Championship	5	0	0	0	—		5	0
GIF Sundsvall	2019	Allsvenskan	25	1	1	0	—		26	1
Jönköpings Södra	2020	Superettan	9	1	0	0	—		9	1
Rosenborg	2020	Eliteserien	11	1	0	0	2	0	13	1
Botev Plovdiv	2020–21	Bulgarian First League	15	1	1	0	0	0	16	1
Botev Plovdiv	2021–22	Bulgarian First League	27	4	1	0	0	0	28	4
Botev Plovdiv	2022–23	Bulgarian First League	24	2	2	0	2	0	28	2
Botev Plovdiv	Total		66	7	4	0	2	0	72	7
Nea Salamina Famagusta	2023–24	Cypriot First Division	19	0	2	0	0	0	21	0
Spartak Varna	2024–25	Bulgarian First League	2	0	0	0	0	0	2	0
KuPS	2025	Veikkausliiga	1	0	0	0	0	0	1	0
Career total			186	8	15	0	11	0	212	8

== Honours ==
Malmö FF

- Allsvenskan: 2013, 2014, 2016, 2017
- Svenska Supercupen: 2014

Sweden U21

- UEFA European Under-21 Championship: 2015
