= Filip Helander =

Swedish footballer

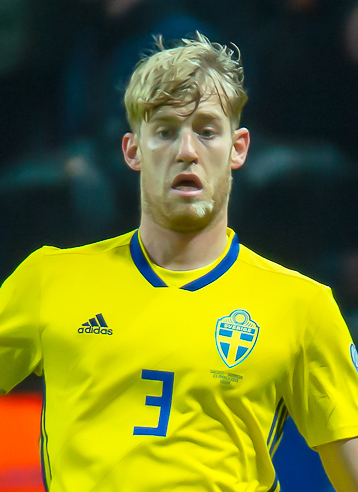
- Helander with Sweden in 2019

Personal information
- Full name: Filip Viktor Helander
- Date of birth: 22 April 1993 (age 33)
- Place of birth: Malmö, Sweden
- Height: 1.92 m (6 ft 4 in)
- Position: Centre-back

Team information
- Current team: BK Häcken
- Number: 22

Youth career
- Kvarnby IK
- Husie IF
- 2007–2011: Malmö FF

Senior career*
| Years | Team | Apps | (Gls) |
| 2011–2015 | Malmö FF | 72 | (1) |
| 2015–2016 | Verona | 24 | (2) |
| 2016–2019 | Bologna | 60 | (1) |
| 2019–2023 | Rangers | 36 | (3) |
| 2023–2024 | OB | 22 | (1) |
| 2024–2025 | Omonia | 13 | (2) |
| 2025 | → BK Häcken (loan) | 7 | (1) |
| 2025– | BK Häcken | 10 | (1) |

International career^{‡}
| 2010 | Sweden U17 | 2 | (0) |
| 2011–2012 | Sweden U19 | 2 | (0) |
| 2012–2015 | Sweden U21 | 19 | (0) |
| 2017–2023 | Sweden | 23 | (0) |
Medal record
Men's football
Representing Sweden
UEFA European Under-21 Championship
| Winner | 2015 |
- * Club domestic league appearances and goals as of 8 July 2026 ‡ National team caps and goals as of 16:42, 20 November 2023 (UTC)

Filip Viktor Helander (born 22 April 1993) is a Swedish professional footballer who plays as a centre-back for BK Häcken.

== Club career ==
=== Malmö ===
Helander made his Allsvenskan debut in a match against Syrianska on 17 October 2011. Helander played the first matches beside Pontus Jansson in defence before being replaced by Daniel Andersson after the second round of matches. On 17 July 2012, Helander signed a first team contract with Malmö until the end of the 2015 season. When Andersson played less and less after the summer break Helander established himself in the starting lineup and finished the season as a regular starter in the defence. Helander played a total of 12 league matches for Malmö during the 2012 season.

The league title winning 2013 season proved to be the real breakthrough season for Helander as he played 18 matches for the club. He was injured in the early stages of the season and was replaced in the starting line-up by Erik Johansson but later reclaimed this spot in the second part of the season. For the 2014 season Helander played regularly throughout the entire season as the club defended their league title and qualified for the group stage of the 2014–15 UEFA Champions League. He also scored his first league goal for Malmö in 2014 on 23 August in a 3–0 home win against IFK Norrköping. For his performances in the league Helander was nominated for the award of Allsvenskan defender of the year. He was also nominated for Swedish defender of the year at Fotbollsgalan.

=== Hellas Verona ===
On 22 July 2015, Helander signed for Italian club Hellas Verona. On 23 September, he made his debut against Internazionale in a 1–0 defeat at the San Siro. In the next game against Lazio at home he again was in the starting line up and in the 33rd minute he scored his first Serie A goal. Lazio went on to win the game 2–1.

=== Bologna ===
On 31 August 2016, Helander joined Bologna on a season-long loan deal, with an obligation to sign outright at the end of season. As part of the deal, Nicolò Cherubin moved to Verona. On 12 June 2017, Helander joined Bologna on a definitive basis.

The following season, his second with the Rossoblù, Helander found more space in the rotation under coach Roberto Donadoni, playing 29 games. His club season ended early in April 2018 because of an injury, but without risking the World Cup in which he participated as a reserve.

=== Rangers ===
Helander was announced as a new signing for Rangers in the Scottish Premiership on 13 July 2019. Helander's cost was £3.5 million. He made his debut in a Scottish League Cup tie against East Fife, scoring a goal as Rangers came out 3–0 victors.

On 11 March 2021, Helander scored the equaliser for Rangers in a 1–1 draw away to Slavia Prague in their Europa League Round of 16 first leg match.

On 29 August 2021, Helander scored the only goal of the game for Rangers against Celtic in the first Old Firm derby of the 2021–22 season. On 15 September 2021, Rangers manager Steven Gerrard announced that Helander would be out for the foreseeable future after having undergone surgery on a knee injury sustained in a 2–1 win over St Johnstone four days prior.

Rangers confirmed on 23 May 2023 that Helander would leave the club at the end of the 2022–23 season.

=== OB ===
On 31 August 2023, Helander joined Danish Superliga side OB on a one-year deal. Made his debut in a 3–0 defeat to Silkeborg IF on 18 September 2023.

He left OB at the end of the season.

=== AC Omonia ===
On 4 July 2024, his signing by Cypriot club AC Omonia was announced.

=== BK Häcken ===
On 29 August 2025, Helander was loaned to BK Häcken until the end of the season.

On 11 December 2025, Helander signed for BK Häcken on a three-year contract.

== International career ==
Helander was called up to the senior Sweden squad to face Moldova in October 2015.

He was part of Sweden's squad for the 2018 FIFA World Cup in Russia.

In May 2021, he was named in Sweden's squad for the postponed UEFA Euro 2020 tournament.

== Career statistics ==
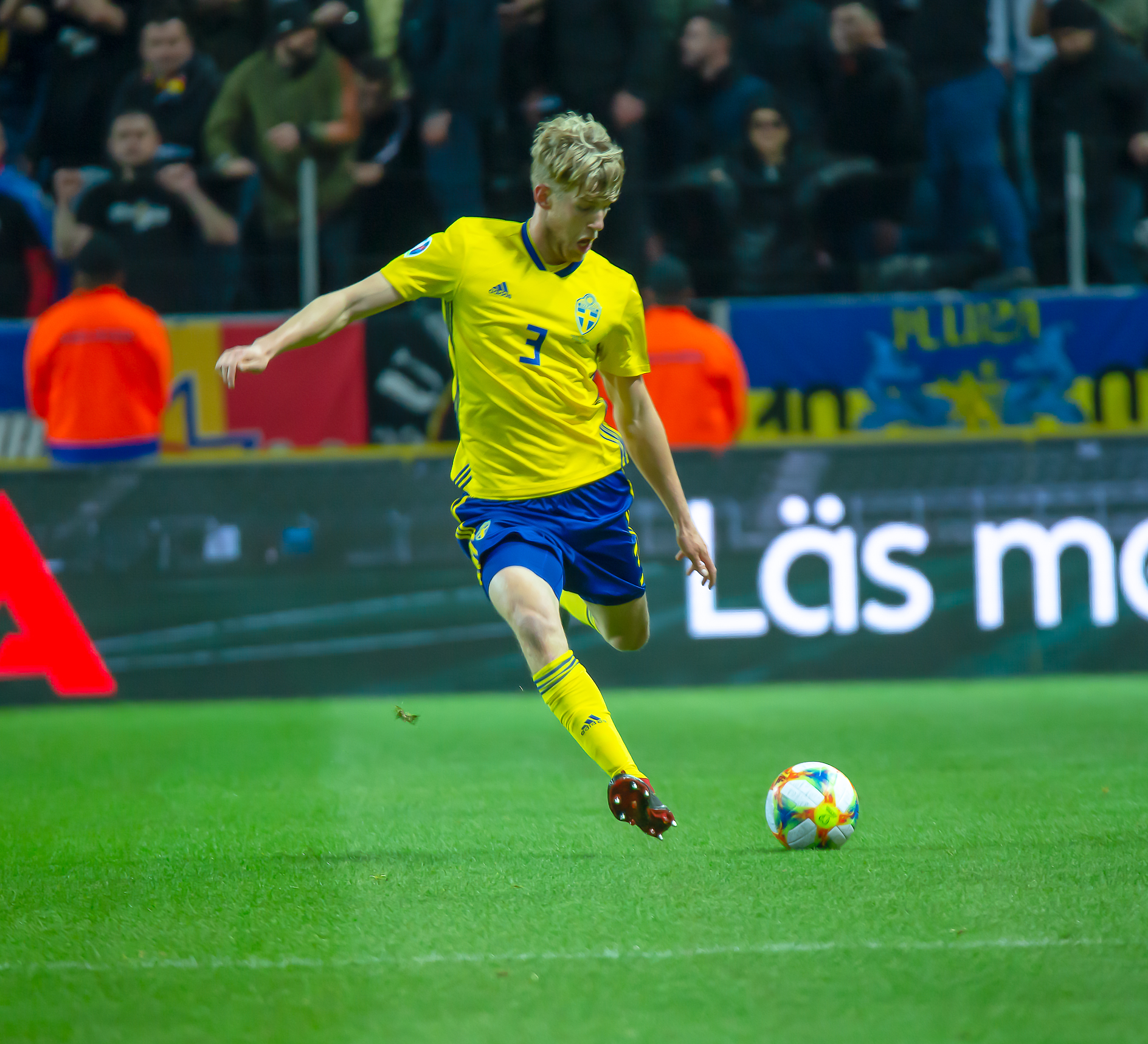
Helander in 2019

=== Club ===
As of 17 April 2022

Appearances and goals by club, season and competition
| Club | Season | League | | | National cup | | League cup | | Continental | | Total | |
| Club | Season | Division | Apps | Goals | Apps | Goals | Apps | Goals | Apps | Goals | Apps | Goals |
|---|---|---|---|---|---|---|---|---|---|---|---|---|
| Malmö FF | 2011 | Allsvenskan | 1 | 0 | 0 | 0 | — | | 0 | 0 | 1 | 0 |
| Malmö FF | 2012 | Allsvenskan | 12 | 0 | 0 | 0 | — | | — | | 12 | 0 |
| Malmö FF | 2013 | Allsvenskan | 18 | 0 | 3 | 0 | — | | 2 (Note: Appearances in UEFA Europa League) | 0 | 23 | 0 |
| Malmö FF | 2014 | Allsvenskan | 28 | 1 | 4 | 1 | — | | 10 (Note: Appearances in UEFA Champions League) | 0 | 42 | 2 |
| Malmö FF | 2015 | Allsvenskan | 12 | 0 | 4 | 1 | — | | 0 | 0 | 16 | 1 |
| Malmö FF | Total | | 71 | 1 | 11 | 2 | — | | 12 | 0 | 94 | 3 |
| Hellas Verona | 2015–16 | Serie A | 24 | 2 | 2 | 0 | — | | — | | 26 | 2 |
| Hellas Verona | 2016–17 | Serie B | 0 | 0 | 2 | 0 | — | | — | | 2 | 0 |
| Hellas Verona | Total | | 24 | 2 | 4 | 0 | — | | — | | 28 | 2 |
| Bologna | 2016–17 | Serie A | 11 | 1 | 0 | 0 | — | | — | | 11 | 1 |
| Bologna | 2017–18 | Serie A | 29 | 0 | 0 | 0 | — | | — | | 29 | 0 |
| Bologna | 2018–19 | Serie A | 20 | 0 | 3 | 0 | — | | — | | 23 | 0 |
| Bologna | Total | | 60 | 1 | 3 | 0 | — | | — | | 63 | 1 |
| Rangers | 2019–20 | Scottish Premiership | 8 | 1 | 0 | 0 | 4 | 1 | 6 | 0 | 18 | 2 |
| Rangers | 2020–21 | Scottish Premiership | 22 | 1 | 3 | 0 | 0 | 0 | 6 | 2 | 31 | 3 |
| Rangers | 2021–22 | Scottish Premiership | 6 | 1 | 2 | 1 | 0 | 0 | 3 (Note: One appearance in UEFA Champions League, two appearances in UEFA Europa League) | 0 | 11 | 2 |
| Rangers | Total | | 36 | 3 | 5 | 1 | 4 | 1 | 15 | 2 | 60 | 7 |
| Career total | | | 191 | 7 | 23 | 3 | 4 | 1 | 27 | 2 | 245 | 13 |

=== International ===
As of match played on 19 November 2023

Appearances and goals by national team and year
| National team | Year | Apps | Goals |
|---|---|---|---|
| Sweden | 2017 | 3 | 0 |
| Sweden | 2018 | 3 | 0 |
| Sweden | 2019 | 5 | 0 |
| Sweden | 2020 | 2 | 0 |
| Sweden | 2021 | 5 | 0 |
| Sweden | 2022 | 1 | 0 |
| Sweden | 2023 | 4 | 0 |
| Total | | 23 | 0 |

== Honours ==
Malmö FF

- Allsvenskan: 2013, 2014
- Svenska Supercupen: 2014

Rangers

- Scottish Premiership: 2020–21
- Scottish Cup: 2021–22
- Scottish League Cup runner-up: 2019–20

Sweden U21

- UEFA European Under-21 Championship: 2015

Individual

- UEFA European Under-21 Championship – Team of the Tournament: 2015
