= Erdal Rakip =

Macedonian footballer

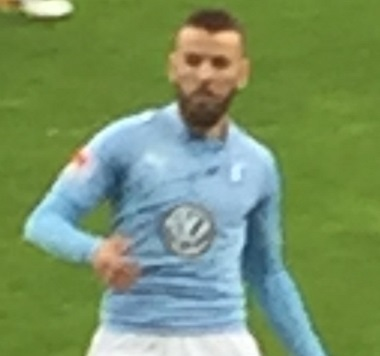
- Rakip playing for Malmö FF in 2016

Personal information
- Full name: Erdal Rakip; Ердал Ракип
- Date of birth: 13 February 1996 (age 30)
- Place of birth: Malmö, Sweden
- Height: 1.77 m (5 ft 10 in)
- Position: Midfielder

Team information
- Current team: Örebro SK
- Number: 23

Youth career
- 2001–2013: Malmö FF

Senior career*
Years	Team	Apps	(Gls)
2013–2017	Malmö FF	90	(11)
2018–2019	Benfica	0	(0)
2018	→ Crystal Palace (loan)	0	(0)
2019–2023	Malmö FF	90	(4)
2023–2025	Antalyaspor	70	(1)
2026	Miedź Legnica	13	(0)
2026–	Örebro SK	9	(1)

International career
2011–2013	Sweden U17	15	(1)
2013–2015	Sweden U19	14	(2)
2015–2018	Sweden U21	15	(2)
2021	North Macedonia	2	(0)
Medal record
Men's football
Representing Sweden
FIFA U-17 World Cup
Third place	2013 United Arab Emirates
- * Club domestic league appearances and goals as of 12 November 2026

Erdal Rakip (Macedonian: Ердал Ракип; Albanian: Erdal Rakipi; born 13 February 1996) is a professional footballer who plays as a midfielder for Superettan club Örebro SK. Born in Sweden, he plays for the North Macedonia national team.

== Club career ==
=== Malmö FF ===
Rakip made his Allsvenskan debut for Malmö FF in an away fixture against IF Brommapojkarna at Grimsta IP on 1 June 2013. On 17 June 2013, Rakip signed a two and a half year youth contract with Malmö FF until the end of the 2015 season. On 15 July 2014 Rakip signed a first team contract with Malmö FF for three and a half additional years at the club. The 2014 season saw more playing time for Rakip as he made 15 appearances for the club. He also participated in play during the group stage of the 2014–15 and 2015–16 UEFA Champions League.

=== Benfica ===
After his contract with Malmö expired at the end of the 2017 Swedish season, Rakip signed for Portuguese champions Benfica.

==== Loan to Crystal Palace ====
Before playing any games for them, he was loaned out for the rest of the 2017–18 season to English club Crystal Palace. Rakip ultimately did not end up playing in any games, but was an unused substitute for Crystal Palace in Premier League fixtures against Everton, Tottenham and Manchester United.

=== Return to Malmö FF ===
On 11 February 2019, without having played any match for Benfica, Malmö FF announced Rakip's return to the Swedish club, reportedly for a €500,000 transfer fee, with Benfica being entitled to fifty per cent of a future transfer.

=== Antalyaspor ===
On 20 January 2023, Rakip signed a two-and-a-half-year contract with Antalyaspor in Turkey.

=== Miedź Legnica ===
On 26 January 2026, Rakip joined Polish second division side Miedź Legnica on a free transfer. He ended the season with one assist in thirteen league appearances. He left Miedź at the end of his contract in June 2026.

=== Örebro SK ===
On 31 August 2026, Rakip signed a four-month contract with Superettan club Örebro SK.

== International career ==
Rakip entered his first international tournament at the 2013 FIFA U-17 World Cup in the United Arab Emirates where Sweden won a bronze medal, he scored his first international goal against Honduras in the quarter final. Rakip played six out of seven matches for Sweden during the tournament and scored one goal, he missed the first group stage match against Iraq due to a previous suspension.

Rakip holds the citizenship of Sweden and North Macedonia and is of Turkish and Albanian descent. He debuted with the North Macedonia national team in a 4–0 2022 FIFA World Cup qualification win over Liechtenstein on 8 October 2021.

== Career statistics ==
=== Club ===
As of match played 17 May 2026

Appearances and goals by club, season and competition
Club	Season	League			National cup (Note: Includes Svenska Cupen, Turkish Cup)		Continental		Total	
Club	Season	Division	Apps	Goals	Apps	Goals	Apps	Goals	Apps	Goals
Malmö FF	2013	Allsvenskan	1	0	1	0	1 (Note: Appearance(s) in UEFA Europa League)	0	3	0
Malmö FF	2014	Allsvenskan	15	0	3	0	4 (Note: Appearances in UEFA Champions League)	0	22	0
Malmö FF	2015	Allsvenskan	20	1	2	0	10	0	32	1
Malmö FF	2016	Allsvenskan	27	2	6	0	—		33	2
Malmö FF	2017	Allsvenskan	27	8	1	1	2	0	30	9
Malmö FF	Total		90	11	13	1	17	0	120	12
Benfica	2017–18	Primeira Liga	0	0	0	0	0	0	0	0
Crystal Palace (loan)	2017–18	Premier League	0	0	0	0	—		0	0
Malmö FF	2019	Allsvenskan	14	0	3	0	4	4	21	4
Malmö FF	2020	Allsvenskan	26	1	4	0	4	0	34	1
Malmö FF	2021	Allsvenskan	25	2	4	0	14	0	43	2
Malmö FF	2022	Allsvenskan	25	1	7	2	10 (Note: Two appearances in UEFA Champions League, eight appearances in UEFA Europa League)	0	42	3
Malmö FF	Total		90	4	18	2	32	4	140	10
Antalyaspor	2022–23	Süper Lig	15	0	—		—		15	0
Antalyaspor	2023–24	Süper Lig	28	0	2	0	—		30	0
Antalyaspor	2024–25	Süper Lig	27	1	3	0	—		30	1
Antalyaspor	Total		70	1	5	0	—		75	1
Miedź Legnica	2025–26	I liga	13	0	—		—		13	0
Career total			263	16	36	3	49	4	348	23

=== International ===
Appearances and goals by national team and year
National team	Year	Apps	Goals
North Macedonia
North Macedonia	2021	2	0
Total		2	0

== Honours ==
Malmö FF

- Allsvenskan: 2013, 2014, 2016, 2017, 2020, 2021
- Svenska Cupen: 2021–22
- Svenska Supercupen: 2014

Sweden U17

- FIFA U-17 World Cup third place: 2013
