= Enoch Kofi Adu =

Ghanaian footballer (born 1990)

Enoch Adu
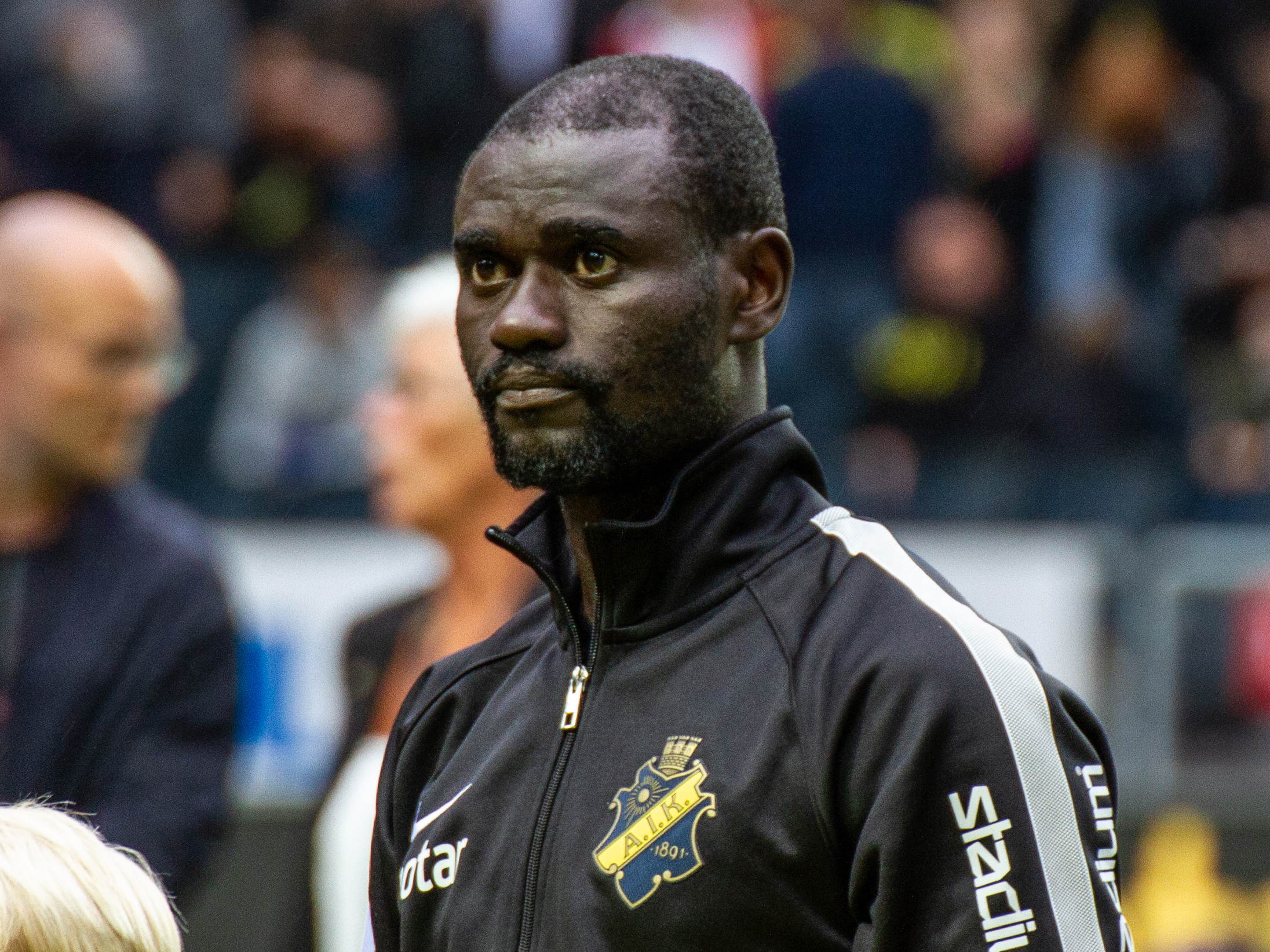
- Adu in 2018

Personal information
- Full name: Enoch Kofi Adu
- Date of birth: 14 September 1990 (age 36)
- Place of birth: Kumasi, Ghana
- Height: 1.78 m (5 ft 10 in)
- Position: Midfielder

Team information
- Current team: EIF
- Number: 8

Youth career
- –2006: Liberty Professionals

Senior career*
Years	Team	Apps	(Gls)
2006–2008	Liberty Professionals		
2008–2010	Nice	0	(0)
2010–2013	Nordsjælland	79	(0)
2013–2014	Club Brugge	18	(0)
2014	→ Stabæk (loan)	16	(1)
2014–2016	Malmö FF	60	(3)
2017	Akhisar Belediyespor	3	(0)
2018–2020	AIK	77	(1)
2021–2022	Mjällby	19	(0)
2023–	EIF	78	(1)

International career^{‡}
2007	Ghana U-17	6	(0)
2016	Ghana	1	(0)
- * Club domestic league appearances and goals as of 23 November 2025 ‡ National team caps and goals as of 17 October 2016

Enoch Kofi Adu (born 14 September 1990) is a Ghanaian professional footballer who plays as a midfielder for Finnish Ykkösliiga club EIF.

== Club career ==
=== Early career and Nice ===
Born in Kumasi, Ghana, Adu started his professional career in 2006 at the local club Liberty Professionals F.C. On 23 September 2008, he moved from Liberty Professionals to French Ligue 1 club OGC Nice and signed a contract extending to 2011. He completed the move with national teammate Abeiku Quansah. On 26 March 2010, Adu went for a trial at Swedish club GAIS. Adu later signed a contract with Danish Superliga club Nordsjælland on 16 July 2010.

==== Nordsjælland ====
Adu quickly became an important player for Nordsjælland as he took a permanent position in the starting eleven. He played continuously in the league, cup, and European competitions during his first season at the club. Adu was part of the Nordsjælland squad that won the Danish Cup during the 2010–11 season, also participating in the final of the competition. Adu continued to be an important player for the club as they won their first league title in the 2011–12 season. Subsequently, the club qualified for the 2012–13 UEFA Champions League where Adu participated in all six group stage matches when Nordsjælland finished last in their group. Halfway through the 2012–13 season Adu transferred from Nordsjælland to Belgian Pro League club Club Brugge.

==== Club Brugge ====
After transferring to Belgium Adu played fairly regularly during the remainder of the 2012–13 season. However, during his second season at the club he played less regularly and was loaned to Norwegian newly promoted Tippeligaen club Stabæk until the summer of 2014.

==== Malmö FF ====
On 8 July 2014 reigning Swedish champions Malmö FF announced that they had signed Adu from Club Brugge as reinforcement for the club's campaign to qualify for the 2014–15 UEFA Champions League. The transfer was originally meant to be carried out on 1 August when Adu's loan contract with Stabæk ran out, however Malmö FF has confirmed that they were in negotiations with Stabæk to acquire Adu when the Swedish transfer window opened on 15 July. At the same time it was also confirmed that Adu would wear the number 8 shirt at the club. On 24 July Stabæk announced that they had agreed to terminate the loan deal prematurely for a minor compensation from Malmö FF. Adu made 15 appearances for Malmö FF during the latter part of the 2014 season, helping the club defend their league title and qualify for the group stage of the 2014–15 UEFA Champions League. Adu was a regular in the next Champions League campaign in 2015–16 as Malmö FF once again qualified for the group stage.

==== AIK ====
On 25 October 2017, Adu joined Swedish club AIK on a three-year contract from Akhisar Belediyespor.

== International career ==
Adu represented the Ghana national under-17 team at the 2007 FIFA U-17 World Cup held in Korea Republic and played six matches in the tournament. Adu was called up to the senior Ghana side for a 2018 FIFA World Cup qualifier against Uganda in October 2016. He made his international debut in a friendly game against South Africa on 11 October 2016.

== Career statistics ==
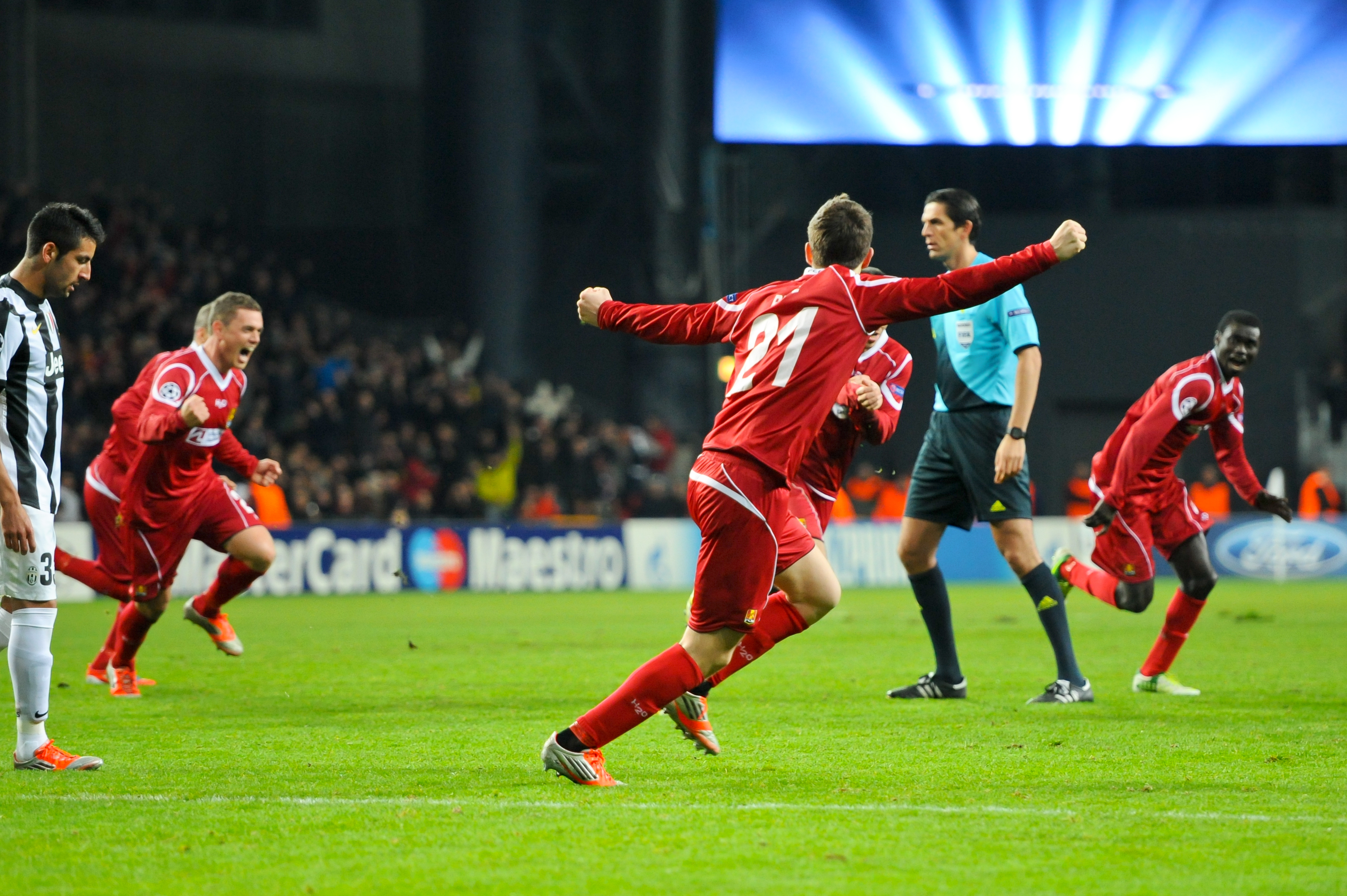
Adu (far-right) celebrating a goal with FC Nordsjælland teammates against Juventus in the 2012–13 UEFA Champions League.

As of 4 December 2024

Appearances and goals by club, season and competition
Club	Season	Division	League		Domestic Cups (Note: Includes Danish Cup, Norwegian Cup, Svenska Cupen, Turkish Cup, Suomen Cup and Finnish League Cup)		Continental		Total	
Club	Season	Division	Apps	Goals	Apps	Goals	Apps	Goals	Apps	Goals
Nice	2008–09	Ligue 1	0	0	0	0	—		0	0
Nice	2009–10	Ligue 1	0	0	0	0	—		0	0
Nice	Total		0	0	0	0	0	0	0	0
FC Nordsjælland	2010–11	Danish Superliga	29	0	5	0	2	0	36	0
FC Nordsjælland	2011–12	Danish Superliga	32	0	2	0	1	0	35	0
FC Nordsjælland	2012–13	Danish Superliga	18	0	0	0	6	0	24	0
FC Nordsjælland	Total		79	0	7	0	9	0	95	0
Club Brugge	2012–13	Belgian First Division A	11	0	0	0	0	0	11	0
Club Brugge	2013–14	Belgian First Division A	7	0	0	0	0	0	7	0
Club Brugge	Total		18	0	0	0	0	0	18	0
Stabæk (loan)	2014	Tippeligaen	16	1	2	2	—		18	3
Malmö FF	2014	Allsvenskan	15	0	0	0	10	0	25	0
Malmö FF	2015	Allsvenskan	27	2	5	1	10	0	42	3
Malmö FF	2016	Allsvenskan	18	1	1	0	—		19	1
Malmö FF	Total		60	3	6	1	20	0	86	4
Akhisar Belediyespor	2016–17	Süper Lig	3	0	4	0	—		7	0
AIK	2018	Allsvenskan	27	0	5	0	4	0	36	0
AIK	2019	Allsvenskan	27	0	6	0	8	0	41	0
AIK	2020	Allsvenskan	23	1	5	0	0	0	28	1
AIK	Total		77	1	16	0	12	0	105	1
Mjällby	2021	Allsvenskan	19	0	3	0	—		22	0
Mjällby	2022	Allsvenskan	0	0	0	0	—		0	0
Mjällby	Total		19	0	3	0	0	0	22	0
Ekenäs IF	2023	Ykkönen	27	0	4	0	—		31	0
Ekenäs IF	2024	Veikkausliiga	26	1	7	0	—		33	1
Ekenäs IF	Total		53	1	11	0	0	0	64	1
Career total			325	6	49	3	41	0	415	9

== Honours ==
FC Nordsjælland

- Danish Cup: 2010–11
- Danish Superliga: 2011–12

Malmö FF

- Allsvenskan: 2014, 2016
- Svenska Supercupen: 2014

AIK

- Allsvenskan: 2018
