= Alexander Blomqvist =

Swedish footballer (born 1994)

Personal information
- Date of birth: 3 August 1994 (age 32)
- Place of birth: Simrishamn, Sweden
- Height: 1.82 m (6 ft 0 in)
- Position: Centre back

Team information
- Current team: Ariana
- Number: 4

Youth career
- –2006: IFK Simrishamn
- 2006–2012: Malmö FF

Senior career*
Years	Team	Apps	(Gls)
2013–2016	Malmö FF	1	(0)
2015	→ IFK Värnamo (loan)	30	(0)
2016–2018	Trelleborgs FF	86	(7)
2019–2023	GIF Sundsvall	107	(6)
2024–	Ariana	13	(0)

International career
2010–2011	Sweden U17	7	(0)
2012–2013	Sweden U19	7	(0)
- * Club domestic league appearances and goals as of 1 August 2024

Alexander Blomqvist (born 3 August 1994) is a Swedish footballer who plays for Ariana in the Ettan Södra.

== Career ==
=== Club career ===
On 23 November 2012 Blomqvist signed a first team contract on a youth basis with Malmö FF. Blomqvist made his Allsvenskan debut for Malmö FF in a home fixture against Kalmar FF on 14 April 2013. He was substituted on 73 minutes into the game, however after just six minutes of play he had to be taken off the field due to a suspected cruciate ligament injury. After recovering from his injury he suffered an identical injury in the same knee during Malmö FF's pre-season training camp in January 2014, this meant that Blomqvist missed the entire 2014 season. For the 2015 season he was sent on loan to IFK Värnamo in Superettan.

== Career statistics ==
As of 28 November 2018.

Club	Season	League		Cup		Continental		Other		Total	
Club	Season	Apps	Goals	Apps	Goals	Apps	Goals	Apps	Goals	Apps	Goals
Malmö FF	2013	1	0	0	0	0	0	—		1	0
Malmö FF	2014	0	0	0	0	0	0	—		0	0
Malmö FF	Total	1	0	0	0	0	0	0	0	1	0
IFK Värnamo (loan)	2015	30	0	0	0	—		—		30	0
Trelleborgs FF	2016	30	2	1	0	—		—		31	2
Trelleborgs FF	2017	27	4	4	0	—		2 (Note: Appearances in the Allsvenskan/Superettan play-offs)	0	33	4
Trelleborgs FF	2018	29	1	4	0	—		—		33	1
Trelleborgs FF	Total	86	7	9	0	0	0	2	0	97	0
Career total		117	7	9	0	0	0	2	0	128	0
