= 2014 Svenska Supercupen =

- Event: Svenska Supercupen
Malmö FF	IF Elfsborg
2	2
- Malmö FF won 5–4 on penalties
- Date: 9 November 2014
- Venue: Malmö Stadion, Malmö
- Referee: Martin Strömbergsson (Gävle)
- Attendance: 1,266
- Weather: Clear; 10 °C (50 °F); 89% humidity

2014 Svenska Supercupen (Swedish Super Cup 2014) was the 8th edition Svenska Supercupen annual football match that 2014 Allsvenskan champions Malmö FF defeated 2014 Svenska Cupen champions IF Elfsborg, 5-4. The match was staged on 9 November 2014 at Malmö Stadion, Malmö. The match was IF Elfsborg's second edition in the competition after a hiatus since 2007. It was Malmö FF's second consecutive and third successive appearances. This match was the first time that the competition was hosted at Malmö Stadion and was the first time the competition was hosted as an alternative home venue.

In Sweden the match was broadcast live on TV12. Martin Strömbergsson from Gävle was the referee for match, his first time officiating the competition. His older brother Markus had previously officiated three Svenska Supercupen matches. Malmö FF won the match on penalties 5–4 after the match had ended 2–2 after extra time. IF Elfsborg took the lead through Viktor Claesson in the first half, Malmö FF equalized Elfsborg's lead in the 89th minute of ordinary time. Malmö FF then took the lead through Emil Forsberg in the second half of extra time, only to have their lead equalized by Viktor Prodell on a penalty in the last minute of extra time. The match proceeded to penalties which Malmö FF won 5–4 after Elfsborg had missed their last two penalties. This was the first time Svenska Supercupen went to extra time and penalties since its founding in 2007.

== Background ==
IF Elfsborg qualified for Svenska Supercupen on 18 May 2014 when they won the 2014 Svenska Cupen Final against Helsingborgs IF 1–0. Elfsborg had one previous appearance in the competition, the inaugural edition of 2007 when they won the title after beating Helsingborgs IF 1–0 at Borås Arena. Malmö FF qualified for the competition of 5 October 2014 when they secured the 2014 Allsvenskan title in the 27th league round in the away fixture against AIK at Friends Arena with a 3–2 win. Malmö FF made their second successive appearance in the competition, being the current holders of the title after defeating IFK Göteborg in last year's competition. The match was Malmö FF's third appearance in total for Svenska Supercupen. Malmö FF had home advantage in the competition as league champions. Malmö FF chose to play the match at the clubs alternative home venue Malmö Stadion.

The two clubs met in league play during the season, Malmö FF defeated Elfsborg at Borås Arena 1–0 on 1 June 2014 and Elfsborg defeated Malmö FF at Swedbank Stadion 2–1 on 18 October 2014 in the 28th league round. The last time the two clubs faced each other in a domestic cup match was in the semi-finals for Svenska Cupen on 31 May 1984, a match which Malmö FF won 2–0. Malmö FF and Elfsborg had never met each other in a cup final prior to this match. Prior to the match both teams declared that, regardless of which team won the match, they would donate the entire prize-sum of 250,000 SEK to a trust fund in the name of Klas Ingesson, former manager of Elfsborg who died on 29 October 2014.

For Malmö FF two players from the starting line-up, goalkeeper Robin Olsen and defender Erik Johansson missed the match due to injuries sustained in Malmö FF's match in the UEFA Champions League against Atlético Madrid on 4 November 2014. Club captain Guillermo Molins was also missing from a long-term injury that made him miss the second half of the 2014 season. IF Elfsborg had forward Lasse Nilsson, defender Sebastian Holmén and midfielder Anton Andreasson missing due to injuries before the match and defender Jon Jönsson missing for an undisclosed reason.

== Match facts ==
9 November 2014
18:15 UTC+1

Malmö FF	2–2 (a.e.t.)	IF Elfsborg
Kiese Thelin 89'; Forsberg 114'	Report	Claesson 22'; Prodell 120+4' (pen.)
Penalties
Tinnerholm (penalty scored); Forsberg (penalty scored); Kroon (penalty scored); Cibicki (penalty missed); Kiese Thelin (penalty scored); Rakip (penalty scored)	5–4	(penalty scored) Frick; (penalty scored) Prodell; (penalty scored) Rohdén; (penalty scored) Larsson; (penalty missed) Hedlund; (penalty missed) Beckmann

Malmö Stadion, Malmö
Attendance: 1,266
Referee: Martin Strömbergsson (Gävle)

Malmö FF	IF Elfsborg

MALMÖ FF:
GK	27	(Sweden) Zlatan Azinović
RB	3	(Sweden) Anton Tinnerholm (yellow card) 124'
CB	18	(Sweden) Johan Hammar (yellow card) 77' (yellow-red card) 91'
CB	15	(Sweden) Filip Helander
LB	32	(Sweden) Pa Konate
RM	33	(Sweden) Emil Forsberg
CM	6	(Finland) Markus Halsti (c)
CM	11	(Sweden) Simon Thern (substituted off) 60'
LM	20	(Brazil) Ricardinho (substituted off) 46'
FW	24	(Sweden) Isaac Kiese Thelin
FW	26	(Albania) Agon Mehmeti (substituted off) 22'
Substitutes:
GK	16	(Sweden) Sixten Mohlin
MF	5	(Sweden) Erdal Rakip (substituted in) 60'
MF	7	(Sweden) Magnus Eriksson
MF	8	(Ghana) Enoch Kofi Adu
FW	9	(Sweden) Markus Rosenberg
MF	14	(Sweden) Simon Kroon (substituted in) 46'
MF	15	(Poland) Pawel Cibicki (substituted in) 22'
Manager:
(Norway) Åge Hareide

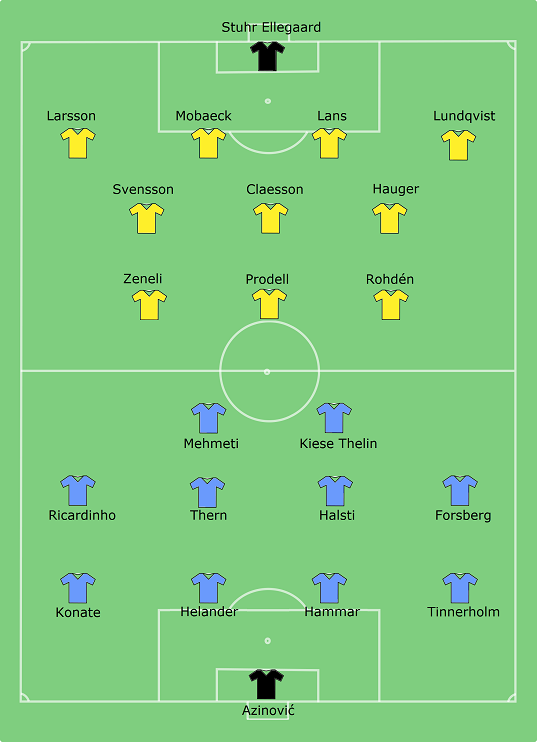

IF ELFSBORG:
GK	1	(Denmark) Kevin Stuhr Ellegaard
RB	7	(Sweden) Johan Larsson (c)
CB	11	(Sweden) Daniel Mobaeck
CB	22	(Sweden) Anton Lans (yellow card) 119'
LB	20	(Sweden) Adam Lundqvist (yellow card) 41'
CM	8	(Sweden) Anders Svensson (yellow card) 56'
CM	16	(Sweden) Viktor Claesson (substituted off) 86'
CM	21	(Norway) Henning Hauger (yellow card) 16' (substituted off) 108'
FW	13	(Sweden) Arber Zeneli (substituted off) 77'
FW	24	(Sweden) Viktor Prodell
FW	25	(Sweden) Marcus Rohdén (yellow card) 106'
Substitutes:
GK	30	(Lebanon) Abbas Hassan
FW	10	(Denmark) Mikkel Beckmann (substituted in) 86'
DF	15	(Sweden) Andreas Klarström
FW	17	(Sweden) Per Frick (substituted in) 108'
FW	18	(Sweden) Victor Rotting
MF	19	(Sweden) Simon Hedlund (substituted in) 77'
MF	26	(Sweden) Liridon Gashi
Manager:
(Sweden) Janne Mian

MATCH OFFICIALS

- Assistant referees:
  - Daniel Gustavsson (Mantorp)
  - Joakim Flink (Karlskrona)
- Fourth official: Kaspar Sjöberg (Malmö)

MATCH RULES

- 90 minutes.
- 30 minutes of extra-time if necessary.
- Penalty shoot-out if scores still level.
- Seven named substitutes.
- Maximum of three substitutions.

== See also ==
- 2014 Allsvenskan
- 2013–14 Svenska Cupen
