= Mahmut Özen =

Swedish footballer

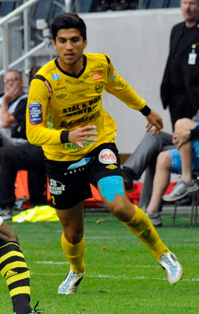
- Özen playing for Mjällby AIF in 2013.

Personal information
- Full name: Mahmut Özen
- Date of birth: 1 September 1988 (age 38)
- Place of birth: Stockholm, Sweden
- Height: 1.79 m (5 ft 10 1/2 in)
- Position: Defender

Team information
- Current team: Nordic United FC
- Number: 21

Youth career
- –2007: Stafsinge IF

Senior career*
Years	Team	Apps	(Gls)
2008	Stafsinge IF		
2009–2011	Varbergs BoIS	66	(1)
2012–2013	Mjällby AIF	28	(0)
2014–2015	Malmö FF	1	(0)
2014–2015	→ Kayseri Erciyesspor (loan)	12	(0)
2016–2017	Adana Demirspor	3	(0)
2017–2021	Falkenbergs FF	79	(1)
2022–	Nordic United FC	25	(1)
- * Club domestic league appearances and goals as of 29 November 2023

Mahmut Özen (born 1 September 1988) is a Swedish footballer who plays as a defender for Ettan club Nordic United FC.

== Career ==
=== Club career ===
==== Early career ====
Özen started his professional career in 2008 at the then Division 4 club Stafsinge IF based in Falkenberg. For the 2009 season he moved to Varbergs BoIS where he played for three seasons, two seasons in Division 2 and one season in Division 1. Özen transferred to Allsvenskan club Mjällby AIF for the 2012 season. After having only played five matches for the club in his debut season, Özen made a breakthrough for the 2013 season where he played a majority of the club's matches.

==== Malmö FF ====
On 3 December 2013 it was announced that Özen had signed a four-year-long contract with the reigning league champions Malmö FF. Özen will wear the number 24 shirt for the club. The transfer went through on 10 January 2014 when the Swedish transfer window opened. After having only appeared in only one league match for the club during the 2014 season, Özen was sent on loan to Turkish Süper Lig side Kayseri Erciyesspor until the end of the 2014–15 season.

=== Adana Demirspor ===
On 7 January 2016 it was confirmed, that Özen had signed a contract with Adana Demirspor.

=== Falkenbergs FF ===
Özen signed for Falkenbergs FF on 13 March 2017.

== Career statistics ==
As of 28 November 2018.

Club	Season	League		Cup		Continental		Total	
Club	Season	Apps	Goals	Apps	Goals	Apps	Goals	Apps	Goals
Varbergs BoIS	2009	20	0	0	0	—		20	0
Varbergs BoIS	2010	22	1	0	0	—		22	0
Varbergs BoIS	2011	24	0	0	0	—		24	0
Varbergs BoIS	Total	66	1	0	0	—		66	1
Mjällby AIF	2012	5	0	1	1	—		6	1
Mjällby AIF	2013	23	0	4	0	—		27	0
Mjällby AIF	Total	28	0	5	1	—		33	1
Malmö FF	2014	1	0	2	0	0	0	3	0
Malmö FF	Total	1	0	2	0	0	0	3	0
Kayseri Erciyesspor (loan)	2014–15	12	0	1	0	—		13	0
Kayseri Erciyesspor (loan)	Total	12	0	1	0	0	0	13	0
Adana Demirspor	2015–16	3	0	0	0	—		3	0
Adana Demirspor	2016–17	0	0	0	0	—		0	0
Adana Demirspor	Total	3	0	0	0	0	0	3	0
Falkenbergs FF	2017	25	1	0	0	—		25	1
Falkenbergs FF	2018	15	0	0	0	—		15	0
Falkenbergs FF	Total	40	1	0	0	0	0	40	1
Career total		150	2	8	1	0	0	158	3

== Honours ==
=== Club ===
Malmö FF

- Allsvenskan: 2014
