= 2013–14 Svenska Cupen =

Tournament details
- Country: Sweden
- Dates: 21 May 2013 – 18 May 2014
- Teams: 114 (including qualifying); 96 (competition proper)

Final positions
- Champions: IF Elfsborg (3rd title)
- Runners-up: Helsingborgs IF

Tournament statistics
- Matches played: 119
- Goals scored: 398 (3.34 per match)
- Top goal scorer(s): David Accam; Simon Kroon; Robin Söder (6 goals)

The 2013–14 Svenska Cupen was the 58th season of Svenska Cupen and the second season with the current format. The winners of the competition earned a place in the second qualifying round of the 2014–15 UEFA Europa League. If they had already qualified for European competition, the qualification spot would have gone to another team, determined by a number of factors.

A total of 96 clubs entered the competition. The first round commenced on 21 May 2013 and the final was played on 18 May 2014 at Friends Arena in Solna. IFK Göteborg were the defending champions, having beaten Djurgårdens IF 3–1 on penalties after the match had finished 1–1 after extra time in last season's final. They were knocked out by Superettan newcomers IK Sirius in the quarter-finals.

IF Elfsborg won their third Svenska Cupen title on 18 May 2014 after defeating Helsingborgs IF 1–0.

== European competition qualification ==
The winners of the 2013–14 Svenska Cupen will earn a place in the second qualifying round of the 2014–15 UEFA Europa League. The qualification spot will be awarded to the runner-up in the competition if the winner is already qualified to the 2014–15 UEFA Champions League by winning the 2013 Allsvenskan. In this case the runner-up will go into the Europa League in the first qualifying round and the third placed team in Allsvenskan will go into the second qualifying round instead of the first qualifying round. If the winner or runner-up (in the previous mentioned situation) is already qualified for the first qualifying round of the Europa League by finishing as the third placed team in Allsvenskan, they will go into the second qualifying round and the fourth placed team in Allsvenskan will be awarded a qualifying spot for the first qualifying round.

== Teams ==
Round	Clubs remaining	Clubs involved	Winners from previous round	New entries this round	Leagues entering at this round
Qualifying rounds	114	22	none	22	Division 1 (2 teams); Division 2 (4 teams); Division 3 (7 teams); Division 4 (6 teams); Division 6 (2 teams); Division 7 (1 team)
Round 1	96	64	4	60	Division 1 (18 teams); Division 2 (24 teams); Division 3 (9 teams); Division 4 (8 teams); Division 5 (1 team)
Round 2	64	64	32	32	Allsvenskan; Superettan
Group stage	32	32	32	none	none
Quarter-finals	8	8	8	none	none
Semi-finals	4	4	4	none	none
Final	2	2	2	none	none

== Qualifying rounds ==
The only three associations of the Swedish District Football Associations that had a qualifying tournament were Dalarnas FF, Hälsinglands FF and Örebro Läns FF, the other districts decided their teams by Distriktsmästerskap (District Championships) or by club ranking 2012.

== Round 1 ==
64 teams from the third tier and below of the Swedish league system competed in this round. The round started on 21 May 2013 and finished on 4 August. The number in brackets indicates what tier of Swedish football each team competed in during the 2013 season. Bunkeflo FF was the lowest-ranked team in this round, competing in Division 5, the seventh tier of Swedish football.

21 May 2013	Hyltebruks IF (6)	2–3	Ljungby IF (4)	Hyltebruk
19:00	J. Andersson 27', 81' (pen.)	Report	Delić 23' (pen.); Linnell 74'; Mårtensson 90'	Stadium: Örnvallen; Attendance: 65; Referee: Linuz Söderberg (Halmstad)

29 May 2013	Sunnersta AIF (6)	1–4	AFC United (3)	Uppsala
19:00	Dottemar 1'	Report	Baran 60', 68'; Bapupa 70'; Alriksson 84' (pen.)	Stadium: Sunnersta IP; Attendance: 302; Referee: Johan Thalin (Storvreta)

4 June 2013	Sollentuna FF (4)	0–3	IK Frej (3)	Sollentuna
19:00		Report	Kamara 31', 81'; Johnson 74'	Stadium: Edsbergs Sportfält; Attendance: Unknown; Referee: Jonas Bäcklund (Solna)

12 June 2013	Rynninge IK (4)	3–1	Karlstad BK (3)	Örebro
19:00	Karahmet 6', 62', 73'	Report	Vilhelmsson 42'	Stadium: Grenadjärvallen; Attendance: 132; Referee: Patrik Larsson (Borlänge)

12 June 2013	Karlbergs BK (4)	0–3	IK Sirius (3)	Stockholm
19:00		Report	Skoglund 8'; Gustafsson 31', 39'	Stadium: Stadshagens IP; Attendance: 102; Referee: Andreas Glanberg (Stockholm)

16 June 2013	IFK Aspudden-Tellus (5)	1–2 (a.e.t.)	FC Gute (4)	Stockholm
15:00	Schäfer 20'	Report	Čučković 77' (pen.); Öhman 92'	Stadium: Aspuddens IP; Attendance: Unknown; Referee: Viktor Dovresjö (Stockholm)

20 June 2013	Tibro AIK (4)	1–3	Skövde AIK (3)	Tibro
19:00	Grahn 36'	Report	Gerhardsson 37', 38'; Andersson 80'	Stadium: Sportparken Tibro; Attendance: Unknown; Referee: Granit Maqedonci (Falköping)

25 June 2013	Korsnäs IF (6)	1–5	Sandvikens IF (3)	Falun
19:00	J. Wallén Ljunggren 57'	Report	Vigren 17'; Wanke 24'; Berglund 77'; Hellström 80'; Moosa 87'	Stadium: Lindvallen; Attendance: 171; Referee: Mattias Johansson (Ransta)

26 June 2013	Vänersborgs IF (5)	4–0	Qviding FIF (3)	Vänersborg
19:00	Hellqvist 2', 26'; Tahini 4'; Björkman 90'	Report		Stadium: Vänersvallen; Attendance: 155; Referee: Andreas Ekholm (Trollhättan)

26 June 2013	Melleruds IF (5)	0–2	Torslanda IK (3)	Mellerud
19:30		Report	Darborg 61'; Almlöf Wickman 83'	Stadium: Rådavallen; Attendance: Unknown; Referee: Victor Jensen (Trollhättan)

27 June 2013	IK Sleipner (4)	1–4	Vasalunds IF (3)	Ljunga
19:00	Eyenga 11'	Report	Touma 15', 48', 66'; Kabran 82'	Stadium: Dagsbergsvallen; Attendance: 71; Referee: Jon Lindholm (Linköping)

28 June 2013	IFK Uddevalla (4)	1–0	Utsiktens BK (3)	Uddevalla
19:00	Beqiri 35'	Report		Stadium: Kamratgården; Attendance: 200; Referee: Haris Memišević (Gothenburg)

3 July 2013	Grebo IK (6)	2–5 (a.e.t.)	Västerås SK (3)	Linköping
19:00	Gustafsson 31', 55'	Report	Johansson 33'; Böckert 73', 93'; Hansson 108', 115'	Stadium: Grebovallen; Attendance: 200; Referee: Henrik Persson (Finspång)

17 July 2013	Enköpings SK (4)	3–1 (a.e.t.)	Eskilstuna City (3)	Enköping
19:00	Persson Njie 47', 120'; Norell 114'	Report	Acar 59'	Stadium: Enavallen; Attendance: 232; Referee: Fredrik Hansson (Stockholm)

20 July 2013	IFK Östersund (5)	0–1	Härnösands FF (4)	Östersund
15:00		Report	Ödmark 34'	Stadium: Hofvallens IP; Attendance: Unknown; Referee: Peter Boije (Östersund)

22 July 2013	IFK Kumla (5)	0–3	Carlstad United (4)	Kumla
19:00		Report	Lander 45'; Johansson 47'; Rojas Diaz 58' (pen.)	Stadium: Kumla IP; Attendance: Unknown; Referee: Joakim Östling (Västerås)

23 July 2013	Hudiksvalls FF (4)	2–0	Selånger FK (3)	Hudiksvall
19:00	Brolin 50'; Roos 87'	Report		Stadium: Glysisvallen; Attendance: 249; Referee: Ulrik Ulander (Husum)

27 July 2013	IFK Trelleborg (5)	0–1	Kvarnby IK (4)	Trelleborg
14:00		Report	R. Nilsson 90' (pen.)	Stadium: Vångavallen; Attendance: 75; Referee: Namik Idrizović (Malmö)

27 July 2013	Lerkils IF (6)	0–3	Sävedalens IF (4)	Vallda
14:00		Report	Nilsson 25'; Omeirat 28'; Fagerlund 47'	Stadium: Ledets IP; Attendance: Unknown; Referee: Henrik Hall (Falkenberg)

27 July 2013	Linghems SK (5)	1–3 (a.e.t.)	Tenhults IF (4)	Linghem
15:00	Axelsson 69'	Report	Bäckström 24'; Beik 105'; Hermansson 120'	Stadium: Lingheden; Attendance: 50; Referee: Jacob Hallkvist (Linköping)

28 July 2013	Ullareds IK (6)	7–3	Lindome GIF (4)	Ullared
14:00	D. Haag 3'; Carlsson 42'; Litzell 49', 73', 82'; G. Nilsson 53'; D. Wallnedal 74'	Report	A. Ask 26', 39'; Larsson 30'	Stadium: Hedevi IP; Attendance: Unknown; Referee: Mikael Larsson (Gothenburg)

28 July 2013	Bunkeflo FF (7)	0–7	Eskilsminne IF (4)	Bunkeflostrand
15:00		Report	Chahrour 4'; Olsson 11' (pen.); C. Levi 46', 59', 61', 89'; D. Andersson 82'	Stadium: Brovallen; Attendance: 24; Referee: Henrik Reffers (Arkelstorp)

30 July 2013	IFK Hässleholm (5)	0–3	Torns IF (4)	Hässleholm
19:00		Report	Podsiadly 34'; Pedersen 38'; Lundberg 51'	Stadium: Österås IP; Attendance: 124; Referee: Niklas Olsson (Ystad)

30 July 2013	Västerviks FF (6)	2–9	Lindsdals IF (4)	Västervik
19:00	Grahn 32', 57'	Report	Elgan 8'; F. Petersson 18', 30', 88'; Fredriksson 70'; Olström 73'; M. Axelsson 81', 84'; Christensson 86'	Stadium: Bökensved IP; Attendance: 109; Referee: Mirza Kazić (Växjö)

31 July 2013	Värmdö IF (4)	1–2	Akropolis IF (4)	Värmdö
19:00	Niambele 35'	Report	Tsombos 54'; Strand 88'	Stadium: Värmdövallen; Attendance: 105; Referee: Johan Fält (Enköping)

31 July 2013	Holmalunds IF (5)	2–2 (a.e.t.) (3–5 p)	Norrby IF (4)	Alingsås
19:00	Stenseke 60' (pen.); Mårtensson 93'	Report	Savolainen 37'; Zahui 95'	Stadium: Brogårdsvallen; Attendance: 155; Referee: Daniel Labe (Mölndal)
	Penalties
	Mårtensson (penalty scored); D. Johansson (penalty missed); Heed (penalty scored); Hasan (penalty scored)		(penalty scored) Strinäs; (penalty scored) Savolainen; (penalty scored) Snygg; (penalty scored) Zahui; (penalty scored) Ekvall

3 August 2013	Ronneby BK (5)	0–5	Kristianstads FF (3)	Ronneby
11:00		Report	Hajdari 11', 43'; Henningsson 15'; Ekelund 75'; Danneman 78'	Stadium: Brunnsvallen; Attendance: 70; Referee: Niklas Andersson (Malmö)

4 August 2013	Åsarp-Trädet FK (6)	0–2	Råslätts SK (4)	Åsarp
15:00		Report	Nóbrega 43', 72'	Stadium: Åsarps IP; Attendance: 105; Referee: Daniel Särén (Dannike)

4 August 2013	Mariehem SK (4)	0–2	IFK Luleå (3)	Umeå
16:00		Report	Ahonen 25'; Eriksson 67'	Stadium: MSK Arena; Attendance: 211; Referee: Niklas Abrahamsson (Sollefteå)

4 August 2013	Vimmerby IF (4)	1–1 (a.e.t.) (5–4 p)	Husqvarna FF (3)	Vimmerby
17:00	Kamara 50'	Report	Haidari 35'	Stadium: Vimarvallen; Attendance: 249; Referee: Jon Lindholm (Linköping)
	Penalties
	Carlsson (penalty scored); Borg (penalty scored); Gustafsson (penalty scored); Safiu (penalty scored); Thuresson (penalty scored)		(penalty scored) A. Ibrahim; (penalty scored) M. Ibrahim; (penalty missed) Andersson; (penalty scored) Gustafsson; (penalty scored) Haidari

4 August 2013	Hittarps IK (6)	1–6	Lunds BK (3)	Helsingborg
17:00	Kopfinger 28'	Report	Björkén 31'; Burrniku 40', 52'; Ilić 59'; Devillaz 76'; Zejnullahu 84'	Stadium: Laröds IP; Attendance: Unknown; Referee: Roger Persson (Kristianstad)

4 August 2013	Enskede IK (4)	1–3	Nyköpings BIS (3)	Stockholm
19:00	Hansebjer 40'	Report	Funes 7' (pen.); Johansson 21', 28'	Stadium: Enskede IP; Attendance: Unknown; Referee: Johan Thalin (Storvreta)

== Round 2 ==
All teams from the 2013 Allsvenskan and the 2013 Superettan entered in this round, 32 teams in total, where they were joined by the 32 winners from round 1. The 32 teams from Allsvenskan and Superettan were seeded and played against the 32 winners from round 1, the matches were played at the home venues for the unseeded teams. Ullareds IK was the lowest-ranked team in this round, competing in Division 4, the sixth tier of Swedish football.

20 August 2013	FC Gute (4)	0–5	IFK Värnamo (2)	Visby
19:00		Report	Kamara 25', 85'; Vrebac 35'; Cederqvist 41'; Sacolo 45'	Stadium: Gutavallen; Attendance: Unknown; Referee: Adam Ladebäck (Visby)

21 August 2013	Ullareds IK (6)	0–2	Ljungskile SK (2)	Ullared
18:00		Report	Mustafi 11'; Hopkins 33'	Stadium: Hedevi IP; Attendance: 300; Referee: Andreas Johansson (Jönköping)

21 August 2013	Nyköpings BIS (3)	0–1	BK Häcken (1)	Nyköping
18:00		Report	Strandberg 43'	Stadium: Rosvalla IP; Attendance: 888; Referee: Magnus Ahlsén (Linköping)

21 August 2013	Akropolis IF (4)	0–3	Degerfors IF (2)	Stockholm
18:00		Report	Medvegy 48'; Hedsén 86', 90'	Stadium: Akalla BP; Attendance: Unknown; Referee: Björn Särnbrink (Huddinge)

21 August 2013	Torslanda IK (3)	1–1 (a.e.t.) (4–2 p)	Kalmar FF (1)	Gothenburg
18:00	Odin 90'	Report	Solheim 22'	Stadium: Torslandavallen; Attendance: 450; Referee: Antti Kanerva (Olofstorp)
	Penalties
	Ekdahl (penalty scored); Thordson (penalty scored); Shojaee (penalty missed); Hake (penalty scored); Fonjah (penalty scored)		(penalty missed) McDonald; (penalty scored) Eriksson; (penalty missed) Đorđević; (penalty scored) Rydström

21 August 2013	Ljungby IF (4)	0–2	Halmstads BK (1)	Ljungby
18:00		Report	Baldvinsson 33'; Maholli 74'	Stadium: Lagavallen; Attendance: 810; Referee: Kaspar Sjöberg (Malmö)

21 August 2013	Carlstad United (4)	4–2	Varbergs BoIS (2)	Karlstad
18:30	Molander 18', 45'; Rojas Diaz 65' (pen.); G. Haidar 72'	Report	Sağlık 2'; Rexhepi 25'	Stadium: Klasmossen IP; Attendance: 365; Referee: Johan Öhman (Karlstad)

21 August 2013	Torns IF (4)	1–4	Jönköpings Södra IF (2)	Lund
18:30	Lundberg 43'	Report	Gojani 40' (pen.); Tsiskaridze 45'; Hajdarević 46'; Olsson 79'	Stadium: Tornvallen; Attendance: 387; Referee: Namik Idrizović (Malmö)

21 August 2013	Sävedalens IF (4)	0–6	Malmö FF (1)	Partille
18:30		Report	Rantie 29', 69'; Franklin 58' (o.g.); Kroon 67'; Fadi 84'; Cibicki 89'	Stadium: Vallhamra; Attendance: 2,138; Referee: Magnus Lindgren (Gothenburg)

21 August 2013	Enköpings SK (4)	0–2	Örgryte IS (2)	Enköping
18:30		Report	Sahlin 73'; Ohlsson 80'	Stadium: Enavallen; Attendance: 340; Referee: Jesper Ekwall (Stockholm)

21 August 2013	Vänersborgs IF (5)	0–5	Östersunds FK (2)	Vänersborg
19:00		Report	Morgan 41', 69'; Walker 45'; Rogić 55', 90'	Stadium: Vänersvallen; Attendance: 555; Referee: Granit Maqedonci (Falköping)

21 August 2013	Råslätts SK (4)	1–3	Assyriska FF (2)	Jönköping
19:00	Omeirat 90'	Report	Ünsal 69'; Ćatović 79'; Papagiannopoulos 88'	Stadium: Stadsparksvallen; Attendance: 540; Referee: Jacob Hallkvist (Linköping)

21 August 2013	Skövde AIK (3)	1–3	Ängelholms FF (2)	Skövde
19:00	Gerhardsson 67'	Report	Björkman 29'; El Kabir 58', 69'	Stadium: Södermalms IP; Attendance: 262; Referee: Diako Behnam (Gothenburg)

21 August 2013	IK Frej (3)	0–1 (a.e.t.)	GAIS (2)	Täby
19:00		Report	B. Andersson 101'	Stadium: Vikingavallen; Attendance: 650; Referee: Mohammed Al-Hakim (Köping)

21 August 2013	Kvarnby IK (4)	0–1	Syrianska FC (1)	Malmö
19:00		Report	Machado 17'	Stadium: Bäckagårds IP; Attendance: 467; Referee: Fredrik Klitte (Helsingborg)

21 August 2013	Lindsdals IF (4)	1–2	Gefle IF (1)	Kalmar
19:00	Fredriksson 53'	Report	Oremo 25'; Orlov 47'	Stadium: Lindsdals IP; Attendance: 1,253; Referee: Jonas Karlsson (Målilla)

21 August 2013	Västerås SK (3)	1–3	Östers IF (1)	Västerås
19:00	Östling 51'	Report	Persson 68'; M. Karlsson 69'; Piñones Arce 83' (pen.)	Stadium: Swedbank Park; Attendance: 954; Referee: Per Melin (Solna)

21 August 2013	Vasalunds IF (3)	2–4	GIF Sundsvall (2)	Solna
19:30	Kabran 30'; Nekrouf 55'	Report	15' (o.g.); Eklund 45'; Dibba 80'; Chennoufi 90'	Stadium: Skytteholms IP; Attendance: Unknown; Referee: Jim Petersson (Motala)

22 August 2013	AFC United (3)	2–1	Falkenbergs FF (2)	Upplands Väsby
17:00	Bapupa 13'; Uchechi 47'	Report	Sköld 81'	Stadium: Vilundavallen; Attendance: 145; Referee: Farouk Nehdi (Huddinge)

22 August 2013	Hudiksvalls FF (4)	1–1 (a.e.t.) (5–4 p)	Landskrona BoIS (2)	Hudiksvall
18:00	Hafizović 113'	Report	Persson 109' (o.g.)	Stadium: Glysisvallen; Attendance: 823; Referee: Mohamed Nablsi (Gävle)
	Penalties
	Ericson (penalty missed); Hafizović (penalty scored); Lööf (penalty scored); Kasimir (penalty scored); Broman (penalty scored); Roos (penalty scored)		(penalty missed) Karlsson; (penalty scored) Dahl; (penalty scored) Bradley Ralani; (penalty scored) Nilsson; (penalty scored) E. Andersson; (penalty missed) Malmqvist

22 August 2013	Rynninge IK (4)	2–1	Örebro SK (2)	Örebro
18:15	Karahmet 54', 61'	Report	Pode 2'	Stadium: Grenadjärvallen; Attendance: 1,004; Referee: Johan Krantz (Uppsala)

22 August 2013	Tenhults IF (4)	1–3	Mjällby AIF (1)	Jönköping
18:30	Bäckström 23'	Report	Strömberg 21'; D. Nilsson 51'; Ekenberg 73'	Stadium: Kabevallen; Attendance: Unknown; Referee: Nermin Cisić (Värnamo)

22 August 2013	Lunds BK (3)	0–4	IFK Göteborg (1)	Lund
19:00		Report	Vibe 7'; Larsson 42'; J. Johansson 50'; Bojanić 86'	Stadium: Klostergårdens IP; Attendance: 2,030; Referee: Kristoffer Karlsson (Helsingborg)

22 August 2013	Sandvikens IF (3)	3–2 (a.e.t.)	AIK (1)	Sandviken
19:00	Rudolph 45+1'; Stadler 76', 108'	Report	Bahoui 12', 61'	Stadium: Jernvallen; Attendance: 2,859; Referee: Martin Strömbergsson (Gävle)

22 August 2013	Härnösands FF (4)	0–4	Helsingborgs IF (1)	Härnösand
19:00		Report	Sadiku 24'; Boateng 31', 55'; Smárason 75'	Stadium: Högslättens IP; Attendance: 2,400; Referee: Patrik Eriksson (Gävle)

22 August 2013	IFK Luleå (3)	0–1 (a.e.t.)	IF Brommapojkarna (1)	Luleå
19:00		Report	G. Sandberg Magnusson 110'	Stadium: Skogsvallen; Attendance: 836; Referee: Lars Olsson (Umeå)

22 August 2013	IFK Uddevalla (4)	2–2 (a.e.t.) (1–3 p)	Åtvidabergs FF (1)	Uddevalla
19:00	Fehrić 14'; Júlíusson 82'	Report	Santos 26'; Sjölund 49' (pen.)	Stadium: Kamratgården; Attendance: 1,200; Referee: Adnan Jukić (Falkenberg)
	Penalties
	Andreasson (penalty scored); Qeriqi (penalty missed); Brändén (penalty missed); Nyberg (penalty missed)		(penalty scored) Möller; (penalty missed) Sjölund; (penalty scored) Tinnerholm; (penalty scored) Bergström

29 August 2013	Vimmerby IF (4)	0–4	IFK Norrköping (1)	Vimmerby
18:00		Report	Friberg da Cruz 9'; Nyman 13', 43'; Fransson 26'	Stadium: Vimarvallen; Attendance: 1,433; Referee: Mikael Eriksson (Jönköping)

5 September 2013	IK Sirius (3)	4–1	IK Brage (2)	Uppsala
19:00	Mrabti 2', 34'; Larson 75'; Käck 90'	Report	Magnusson 71'	Stadium: Studenternas IP; Attendance: 877; Referee: Johan Hamlin (Bro)

5 September 2013	Norrby IF (4)	0–2	Hammarby IF (2)	Borås
19:00		Report	Besara 67'; Lallet 90'	Stadium: Borås Arena; Attendance: 1,856; Referee: Alexander Pavlović (Gothenburg)

11 September 2013	Eskilsminne IF (4)	0–2	Djurgårdens IF (1)	Helsingborg
19:00		Report	Jawo 65'; Fejzullahu 78'	Stadium: Harlyckans IP; Attendance: 3,011; Referee: Robert Daradić (Helsingborg)

10 November 2013	Kristianstads FF (3)	0–4	IF Elfsborg (1)	Kristianstad
13:30		Report	Hedlund 25'; Rohdén 62', 90'; Jönsson 69'	Stadium: Kristianstads IP; Attendance: 786; Referee: Robert Daradić (Helsingborg)

== Group stage ==
The 32 winners from round 2 were divided into eight groups of four teams. The 16 highest ranked winners from the previous rounds were seeded to the top two positions in each groups and the 16 remaining winners were unseeded in the draw. The ranking of the 16 seeded teams was decided by league position in the 2013 season. All teams in the group played each other once, the highest ranked teams from the previous rounds and lower-tier teams had the right to play two home matches. The draw for the group stage was held on 13 November 2013. The group stage was played in March 2014. Carlstad United BK, Hudiksvalls FF, Rynninge IK, Sandvikens IF and Torslanda IK were the lowest-ranked teams in this round, all competing in Division 2, the fourth tier of Swedish football.

=== Tie-breaking criteria and key ===
If two or more teams were equal on points on completion of the group matches, the following criteria were applied to determine the rankings

1. superior goal difference
2. higher number of goals scored
3. result between the teams in question
4. higher league position in the 2013 season

=== Group 1 ===
Pos	Team	Pld	W	D	L	GF	GA	GD	Pts	Qualification	MFF	HAM	ÄFF	DEG
1	Malmö FF	3	3	0	0	13	3	+10	9	Advance to Knockout stage	—	3–2	—	7–1
2	Hammarby IF	3	1	1	1	5	4	+1	4		—	—	0–0	—
3	Ängelholms FF	3	1	1	1	3	3	0	4		0–3	—	—	—
4	Degerfors IF	3	0	0	3	2	13	−11	0		—	1–3	0–3	—

1 March 2014 Matchday 1	Malmö FF (1)	7–1	Degerfors IF (2)	Malmö
13:00	Kroon 3', 6', 67'; Molins 39', 40'; Eriksson 58'; Forsberg 88'	Report	Samuelsson 18'	Stadium: Malmö IP; Attendance: 3,321; Referee: Robert Daradić (Helsingborg)

4 March 2014 Matchday 1	Hammarby IF (2)	0–0	Ängelholms FF (2)	Stockholm
19:00		Report		Stadium: Tele2 Arena; Attendance: 7,875; Referee: Johan Hamlin (Bro)

8 March 2014 Matchday 2	Ängelholms FF (2)	0–3	Malmö FF (1)	Malmö*
13:00 (* Match was moved since Ängelholms IP wasn't approved for play, Ängelholms FF were designated as the home team of the fixture.)		Report	Molins 33', 54'; Kroon 42'	Stadium: Malmö IP; Attendance: 2,678; Referee: Kristoffer Karlsson (Helsingborg)

9 March 2014 Matchday 2	Degerfors IF (2)	1–3	Hammarby IF (2)	Degerfors
14:00	Besara 14' (o.g.)	Report	Haddad 50', 52'; Fuhre 90'	Stadium: Stora Valla; Attendance: 1,200; Referee: Bojan Pandžić (Gothenburg)

15 March 2014 Matchday 3	Degerfors IF (2)	0–3	Ängelholms FF (2)	Degerfors
13:00		Report	Samuel 21'; Pothast 54', 62'	Stadium: Stora Valla; Referee: Per Melin (Solna)

15 March 2014 Matchday 3	Malmö FF (1)	3–2	Hammarby IF (2)	Malmö
15:30	Forsberg 10'; Rosenberg 25'; Molins 50' (pen.)	Report	Haddad 75'; Fuhre 89'	Stadium: Malmö Stadion; Attendance: 8,276; Referee: Robert Daradić (Helsingborg)

=== Group 2 ===
Pos	Team	Pld	W	D	L	GF	GA	GD	Pts	Qualification	IFKG	IFKG	HFF	IFKV
1	IFK Göteborg	3	3	0	0	16	2	+14	9	Advance to Knockout stage	—	4–2	—	2–0
2	GIF Sundsvall	3	1	1	1	4	4	0	4		—	—	—	0–0
3	Hudiksvalls FF	3	1	0	2	2	12	−10	3		0–10	0–2	—	—
4	IFK Värnamo	3	0	1	2	0	4	−4	1		—	—	0–2	—

1 March 2014 Matchday 1	Hudiksvalls FF (4)	0–2	GIF Sundsvall (2)	Hudiksvall
14:00		Report	Eklund 44'; Danielsson 63'	Stadium: Sparbanken Arena; Attendance: 732; Referee: Per Melin (Solna)

1 March 2014 Matchday 1	IFK Göteborg (1)	2–0	IFK Värnamo (2)	Gothenburg
16:00	Wæhler 61'; Söder 74'	Report		Stadium: Valhalla IP; Attendance: 2,614; Referee: Jim Petersson (Motala)

8 March 2014 Matchday 2	Hudiksvalls FF (4)	0–10	IFK Göteborg (1)	Hudiksvall
14:00		Report	Söder 23', 33', 45', 49', 60'; Haglund 27' (pen.); Vibe 50', 51'; Sobralense 81'; Bojanić 88'	Stadium: Sparbanken Arena; Attendance: 1,463; Referee: Lars Olsson (Umeå)

8 March 2014 Matchday 2	GIF Sundsvall (2)	0–0	IFK Värnamo (2)	Sundsvall
15:00		Report		Stadium: Norrporten Arena; Attendance: 415; Referee: Patrik Eriksson (Gävle)

15 March 2014 Matchday 3	IFK Värnamo (2)	0–2	Hudiksvalls FF (4)	Värnamo
12:00		Report	Hafizovic 47', 54' (pen.)	Stadium: Ljusseveka; Attendance: 220; Referee: Kaspar Sjöberg (Malmö)

15 March 2014 Matchday 3	IFK Göteborg (1)	4–2	GIF Sundsvall (2)	Gothenburg
12:00	Vibe 2', 66'; Wæhler 26'; Larsson 77'	Report	15' (o.g.); Dibba 29'	Stadium: Ullevi; Attendance: 4,850; Referee: Bojan Pandžić (Gothenburg)

=== Group 3 ===
Pos	Team	Pld	W	D	L	GF	GA	GD	Pts	Qualification	HIF	LSK	TIK	SFC
1	Helsingborgs IF	3	3	0	0	11	1	+10	9	Advance to Knockout stage	—	1–0	—	5–1
2	Ljungskile SK	3	1	1	1	3	2	+1	4		—	—	2–0	—
3	Torslanda IK	3	1	0	2	1	7	−6	3		0–5	—	—	1–0
4	Syrianska FC	3	0	1	2	2	7	−5	1		—	1–1	—	—

1 March 2014 Matchday 1	Helsingborgs IF (1)	1–0	Ljungskile SK (2)	Höör
15:00	Accam 64'	Report		Stadium: Färs & Frosta Arena; Attendance: 2,333; Referee: Magnus Ahlsén (Linköping)

2 March 2014 Matchday 1	Torslanda IK (4)	1–0	Syrianska FC (2)	Gothenburg
15:00	Falk 72'	Report		Stadium: Valhalla IP; Attendance: 278; Referee: Antti Kanerva (Olofstorp)

8 March 2014 Matchday 2	Torslanda IK (4)	0–5	Helsingborgs IF (1)	Gothenburg
15:00		Report	Santos 7', 49', 57'; Accam 65'; Smárason 84'	Stadium: Valhalla IP; Referee: Nermin Cisic (Värnamo)

9 March 2014 Matchday 2	Syrianska FC (2)	1–1	Ljungskile SK (2)	Södertälje
16:00	Gerlem 4'	Report	F. Michel 59' (o.g.)	Stadium: Södertälje Fotbollsarena; Attendance: 372; Referee: Glenn Nyberg (Borlänge)

13 March 2014 Matchday 3	Ljungskile SK (2)	2–0	Torslanda IK (4)	Ljungskile
19:00	Johannesson 44'; Olsson 62'	Report		Stadium: Skarsjövallen; Referee: Jim Petersson (Motala)

16 March 2014 Matchday 3	Helsingborgs IF (1)	5–1	Syrianska FC (2)	Helsingborg
15:00	Khalili 44'; Accam 45', 71'; Lindström 49'; Kinnander 75'	Report	F. Michel 30'	Stadium: Olympia; Attendance: 2,100; Referee: Martin Hansson (Holmsjö)

=== Group 4 ===
Pos	Team	Pld	W	D	L	GF	GA	GD	Pts	Qualification	IFE	ÖIF	ÖFK	RIK
1	IF Elfsborg	3	3	0	0	10	0	+10	9	Advance to Knockout stage	—	2–0	3–0	—
2	Östers IF	3	1	1	1	6	5	+1	4		—	—	5–2	—
3	Östersunds FK	3	1	0	2	6	8	−2	3		—	—	—	4–0
4	Rynninge IK	3	0	1	2	1	10	−9	1		0–5	1–1	—	—

1 March 2014 Matchday 1	IF Elfsborg (1)	3–0	Östersunds FK (2)	Borås
14:00	Hult 9', 66', 85'	Report		Stadium: Borås Arena; Attendance: 537; Referee: Michael Lerjéus (Skövde)

1 March 2014 Matchday 1	Rynninge IK (4)	1–1	Östers IF (2)	Örebro
16:30	Diawara 28'	Report	Gero 88'	Stadium: Behrn Arena; Attendance: 184; Referee: Dragan Banjač (Haninge)

8 March 2014 Matchday 2	Rynninge IK (4)	0–5	IF Elfsborg (1)	Örebro
14:00		Report	Rohdén 11'; Frick 35'; Holmén 71'; Larsson 81'; Andreasson 85'	Stadium: Behrn Arena

9 March 2014 Matchday 2	Östers IF (2)	5–2	Östersunds FK (2)	Växjö
14:00	16' (o.g.); Velić 53', 88' (pen.); Söderberg 78'; Henningsson 90'	Report	Barrow 25'; Mendiola 56'	Stadium: Tipshallen; Attendance: 539; Referee: Kaspar Sjöberg (Malmö)

15 March 2014 Matchday 3	Östersunds FK (2)	4–0	Rynninge IK (4)	Östersund
14:00	Ahmed 38' (pen.); Barrow 47', 55'; Smajic 67'	Report		Stadium: Jämtkraft Arena; Attendance: 300; Referee: Lars Olsson (Umeå)

15 March 2014 Matchday 3	IF Elfsborg (1)	2–0	Östers IF (2)	Borås
14:00	Hedlund 39'; Beckmann 73'	Report		Stadium: Borås Arena; Attendance: 1,333; Referee: Magnus Ahlsén (Linköping)

=== Group 5 ===
Pos	Team	Pld	W	D	L	GF	GA	GD	Pts	Qualification	IKS	DIF	HBK	AFF
1	IK Sirius	3	3	0	0	6	2	+4	9	Advance to Knockout stage	—	2–1	2–1	—
2	Djurgårdens IF	3	2	0	1	7	3	+4	6		—	—	4–1	2–0
3	Halmstads BK	3	1	0	2	4	6	−2	3		—	—	—	2–0
4	Assyriska FF	3	0	0	3	0	6	−6	0		0–2	—	—	—

2 March 2014 Matchday 1	IK Sirius (2)	2–1	Djurgårdens IF (1)	Uppsala
15:00	Arvidsson 53' (o.g.); Runnemo 58'	Report	Fejzullahu 36'	Stadium: Lötens IP; Attendance: 3,259; Referee: Mohammed Al-Hakim (Köping)

2 March 2014 Matchday 1	Halmstads BK (1)	2–0	Assyriska FF (2)	Skedala
15:00	Blomberg 16'; Steindórsson 32'	Report		Stadium: Skedalahed IP; Attendance: 451; Referee: Nermin Čisić (Värnamo)

9 March 2014 Matchday 2	Djurgårdens IF (1)	2–0	Assyriska FF (2)	Stockholm
15:00	Johansson 16', 81' (pen.)	Report		Stadium: Tele2 Arena; Attendance: 3,152; Referee: Jonas Eriksson (Stockholm)

9 March 2014 Matchday 2	IK Sirius (2)	2–1	Halmstads BK (1)	Uppsala
15:00	Runnemo 53' (pen.), 85'	Report	Baldvinsson 9'	Stadium: Lötens IP; Referee: Magnus Ahlsén (Linköping)

16 March 2014 Matchday 3	Assyriska FF (2)	0–2	IK Sirius (2)	Södertälje
15:00		Report	Silva 32'; Mrabti 36'	Stadium: Södertälje Fotbollsarena; Referee: Dragan Banjac (Haninge)

16 March 2014 Matchday 3	Djurgårdens IF (1)	4–1	Halmstads BK (1)	Stockholm
15:00	Johansson 11'; Bergström 36'; Liverstam 52' (o.g.); Radetinac 75'	Report	Antonsson 71'	Stadium: Tele2 Arena; Attendance: 2,798; Referee: Markus Strömbergsson (Gävle)

=== Group 6 ===
Pos	Team	Pld	W	D	L	GF	GA	GD	Pts	Qualification	BP	ÅFF	JSIF	CU
1	IF Brommapojkarna	3	2	1	0	5	0	+5	7	Advance to Knockout stage	—	—	0–0	—
2	Åtvidabergs FF	3	1	1	1	6	3	+3	4		0–1	—	4–0	—
3	Jönköpings Södra IF	3	1	1	1	4	4	0	4		—	—	—	4–0
4	Carlstad United	3	0	1	2	2	10	−8	1		0–4	2–2	—	—

1 March 2014 Matchday 1	Carlstad United (4)	0–4	IF Brommapojkarna (1)	Karlstad
14:00		Report	Rexhepi 9', 14'; Bärkroth 45+2'; Kouakou 90'	Stadium: Ilanda IP; Attendance: 319; Referee: Patrik Eriksson (Gävle)

2 March 2014 Matchday 1	Åtvidabergs FF (1)	4–0	Jönköpings Södra IF (2)	Åtvidaberg
14:00	Sjölund 21'; Santos 41', 89'; Karlsson 86'	Report		Stadium: Kopparvallen; Attendance: 1,027; Referee: Martin Hansson (Holmsjö)

8 March 2014 Matchday 2	Carlstad United (4)	2–2	Åtvidabergs FF (1)	Karlstad
14:00	G. Haidar 15'; Molander 74'	Report	Santos 66', 84' (pen.)	Stadium: Ilanda IP; Referee: Antti Kanerva (Olofstorp)

9 March 2014 Matchday 2	IF Brommapojkarna (1)	0–0	Jönköpings Södra IF (2)	Stockholm
15:00		Report		Stadium: Grimsta IP; Referee: Jim Petersson (Motala)

15 March 2014 Matchday 3	Jönköpings Södra IF (2)	4–0	Carlstad United (4)	Jönköping
14:00	Olsson 38'; 67' (o.g.); Sabo 80', 90'	Report		Stadium: Rosenlunds IP; Referee: Antti Kanerva (Olofstorp)

15 March 2014 Matchday 3	Åtvidabergs FF (1)	0–1	IF Brommapojkarna (1)	Åtvidaberg
14:00		Report	Karlström 24'	Stadium: Kopparvallen; Attendance: 917; Referee: Glenn Nyberg (Borlänge)

=== Group 7 ===
Pos	Team	Pld	W	D	L	GF	GA	GD	Pts	Qualification	GAIS	GIF	IFKN	AFCU
1	GAIS	3	2	1	0	3	1	+2	7	Advance to Knockout stage	—	—	—	1–0
2	Gefle IF	3	1	2	0	3	2	+1	5		1–1	—	—	—
3	IFK Norrköping	3	1	1	1	3	2	+1	4		0–1	1–1	—	—
4	AFC United	3	0	0	3	0	4	−4	0		—	0–1	0–2	—

1 March 2014 Matchday 1	IFK Norrköping (1)	0–1	GAIS (2)	Norrköping
15:00		Report	Drugge 22' (pen.)	Stadium: Idrottsparken; Attendance: 1,304; Referee: Glenn Nyberg (Borlänge)

2 March 2014 Matchday 1	AFC United (3)	0–1	Gefle IF (1)	Solna
13:00		Report	Williams 40'	Stadium: Skytteholms IP; Attendance: 200; Referee: Johan Hamlin (Bro)

9 March 2014 Matchday 2	AFC United (3)	0–2	IFK Norrköping (1)	Solna
13:00		Report	Kujović 39', 88'	Stadium: Skytteholms IP; Referee: Dragan Banjac (Haninge)

9 March 2014 Matchday 2	Gefle IF (1)	1–1	GAIS (2)	Gävle
14:00	Lundevall 86' (pen.)	Report	Moënza 59'	Stadium: Strömvallen; Referee: Mohammed Al-Hakim (Köping)

16 March 2014 Matchday 3	GAIS (2)	1–0	AFC United (3)	Gothenburg
16:00	Drugge 90' (pen.)	Report		Stadium: Valhalla IP; Attendance: 2,356; Referee: Michael Lerjéus (Skövde)

16 March 2014 Matchday 3	IFK Norrköping (1)	1–1	Gefle IF (1)	Norrköping
16:00	Telo 16'	Report	Oremo 75' (pen.)	Stadium: Idrottsparken; Attendance: 767; Referee: Stefan Johannesson (Täby)

=== Group 8 ===
Pos	Team	Pld	W	D	L	GF	GA	GD	Pts	Qualification	BKH	MAIF	ÖIS	SIF
1	BK Häcken	3	3	0	0	9	1	+8	9	Advance to Knockout stage	—	3–0	2–0	—
2	Mjällby AIF	3	2	0	1	3	3	0	6		—	—	2–0	—
3	Örgryte IS	3	1	0	2	2	5	−3	3		—	—	—	2–1
4	Sandvikens IF	3	0	0	3	2	7	−5	0		1–4	0–1	—	—

1 March 2014 Matchday 1	BK Häcken (1)	2–0	Örgryte IS (3)	Gothenburg
12:00	El Kabir 47'; Sa. Gustafson 90+2'	Report		Stadium: Valhalla IP; Attendance: 1,020; Referee: Kristoffer Karlsson (Helsingborg)

1 March 2014 Matchday 1	Sandvikens IF (4)	0–1	Mjällby AIF (1)	Sandviken
14:00		Report	Ekenberg 47'	Stadium: Jernvallen; Attendance: 767; Referee: Markus Strömbergsson (Gävle)

8 March 2014 Matchday 2	Sandvikens IF (4)	1–4	BK Häcken (1)	Sandviken
14:00	Rudolph 90'	Report	Sandberg 4'; Pękalski 38'; Sa. Gustafson 59'; Jeremejeff 82'	Stadium: Jernvallen; Attendance: 580; Referee: Johan Hamlin (Bro)

8 March 2014 Matchday 2	Mjällby AIF (1)	2–0	Örgryte IS (3)	Hällevik
14:00	Haynes 15', 69'	Report		Stadium: Strandvallen; Attendance: 528; Referee: Robert Daradic (Helsingborg)

15 March 2014 Matchday 3	BK Häcken (1)	3–0	Mjällby AIF (1)	Gothenburg
16:00	Sa. Gustafson 72'; El Kabir 74', 79'	Report		Stadium: Valhalla IP; Referee: Mohammed Al-Hakim (Köping)

16 March 2014 Matchday 3	Örgryte IS (3)	2–1	Sandvikens IF (4)	Gothenburg
12:00	S. Carlsson 16'; Mourad 31'	Report	Rudolph 18'	Stadium: Valhalla IP; Referee: Nermin Cisic (Värnamo)

== Knockout stage ==
=== Qualified teams ===
Pos	Grp	Team	Pld	W	D	L	GF	GA	GD	Pts	Qualification
1	2	IFK Göteborg	3	3	0	0	16	2	+14	9	Seeded in Quarter-final draw
2	1	Malmö FF	3	3	0	0	13	3	+10	9	Seeded in Quarter-final draw
3	3	Helsingborgs IF	3	3	0	0	11	1	+10	9	Seeded in Quarter-final draw
4	4	IF Elfsborg	3	3	0	0	10	0	+10	9	Seeded in Quarter-final draw
5	8	BK Häcken	3	3	0	0	9	1	+8	9	Unseeded in Quarter-final draw
6	5	IK Sirius	3	3	0	0	6	2	+4	9	Unseeded in Quarter-final draw
7	6	IF Brommapojkarna	3	2	1	0	5	0	+5	7	Unseeded in Quarter-final draw
8	7	GAIS	3	2	1	0	3	1	+2	7	Unseeded in Quarter-final draw

Source: Group results
Rules for classification: 1) Points; 2) Goal difference; 3) Number of goals scored; 4) Highest ranked team

=== Bracket ===
Quarter-finals
22 March – Malmö
Malmö FF	2
IF Brommapojkarna	0
22 March – Helsingborg
Helsingborgs IF	2
GAIS	1
23 March – Gothenburg
IFK Göteborg	0
IK Sirius	1
23 March – Borås
IF Elfsborg	1
BK Häcken	0

Semi-finals
1 May – Malmö
Malmö FF	0
Helsingborgs IF	2
1 May – Uppsala
IK Sirius	1
IF Elfsborg	4

Final
18 May – Solna
Helsingborgs IF	0
IF Elfsborg	1

=== Quarter-finals ===
The quarter-finals were played on 22 and 23 March 2014 and consisted of the eight teams that won their respective group in the previous round. The four best group winners were seeded and drawn against the remaining four group winners, with the seeded teams entitled to play the match at their home venue. The draw for the quarter-finals was held on 17 March 2014. GAIS and IK Sirius were the lowest-ranked teams in this round, both competing in Superettan, the second tier of Swedish football.

22 March 2014	Helsingborgs IF (1)	2–1	GAIS (2)	Helsingborg
15:00	Accam 50'; Santos 54'	Report	Warshaw 6'	Stadium: Olympia; Attendance: 2,530; Referee: Mohammed Al-Hakim (Köping)

22 March 2014	Malmö FF (1)	2–0	IF Brommapojkarna (1)	Malmö
15:00	Helander 59'; Kroon 86'	Report		Stadium: Swedbank Stadion; Attendance: 3,442; Referee: Andreas Ekberg (Lund)

23 March 2014	IFK Göteborg (1)	0–1	IK Sirius (2)	Gothenburg
15:00		Report	Ogbu 29'	Stadium: Ullevi; Attendance: 4,689; Referee: Bojan Pandžić (Gothenburg)

23 March 2014	IF Elfsborg (1)	1–0	BK Häcken (1)	Borås
15:00	Rohdén 67'	Report		Stadium: Borås Arena; Attendance: 2,228; Referee: Markus Strömbergsson (Gävle)

=== Semi-finals ===
The semi-finals were played on 1 May 2014 and was contested by the four winners from the quarter-finals. The teams drawn first played home. The draw for the semi-finals took place on 25 March 2014. IK Sirius was the lowest-ranked team in this round, competing in Superettan, the second tier of Swedish football.

1 May 2014	Malmö FF (1)	0–2	Helsingborgs IF (1)	Malmö
15:00		Report	Uronen 27'; Accam 90'	Stadium: Swedbank Stadion; Attendance: 8,540; Referee: Martin Hansson (Holmsjö)

1 May 2014	IK Sirius (2)	1–4	IF Elfsborg (1)	Uppsala
15:00	Silva 90'	Report	Prodell 7', 52', 82' (pen.); Hauger 13'	Stadium: Studenternas IP; Attendance: 6,000; Referee: Andreas Ekberg (Lund)

=== Final ===
The final was played on 18 May 2014 at Friends Arena, Solna. The home team was designated through a draw.

18 May 2014
17:00

Helsingborgs IF (1)	0–1	IF Elfsborg (1)
	Report	Nilsson 54'

Friends Arena, Solna
Attendance: 3,423
Referee: Michael Lerjéus (Skövde)
