= 2013–14 Svenska Cupen qualifying rounds =

Football tournament qualification stage

The 2013–14 Svenska Cupen was the 58th season of Svenska Cupen and the second season with the current layout.

A total of 96 clubs entered the competition. The first round commenced on 21 May 2013 and the final was scheduled to be contested in May 2014, As of May 2013 it is still unknown if the final will return to Friends Arena in Solna or if the previous policy with the final being played at one of the finalists stadiums will return. The winners of the competition will earn a place in the second qualifying round of the 2014–15 UEFA Europa League, if they have not already qualified for European competition; if so then the runners-up will instead qualify for the first qualifying round of the competition and the team having finished third in the 2014 Allsvenskan will enter the second qualifying round instead of the first qualifying round and their respective berth will be passed down to the fourth team in the league. IFK Göteborg were the defending champions, having beaten Djurgårdens IF 3–1 on penalties after the match had finished 1–1 after extra time in last season's final. They were knocked out by Superettan newcomers IK Sirius in the quarter-finals. IF Elfsborg won their third Svenska Cupen title on 18 May 2014 after defeating Helsingborgs IF 1–0.

The only three associations of the Swedish District Football Associations that had a qualifying tournament were Dalarnas FF, Hälsinglands FF and Örebro Läns FF, the other districts decided their teams by Distriktsmästerskap (District Championships) or by club ranking 2012.

== Qualified teams ==
Team	District	Method of qualification
Ronneby BK	Blekinge FF	2012 Svenskfast Cup winner
IFK Uddevalla	Bohusläns FF	2012 Distriktsmästerskapet winner
Korsnäs IF	Dalarnas FF	Qualification tournament winner
Melleruds IF	Dalslands FF	2012 Distriktsmästerskapet winner
Sandvikens IF	Gestriklands FF	2012 Distriktsmästerskapet winner
FC Gute	Gotlands FF	2013 Distriktsmästerskapet winner
Qviding FIF	Göteborgs FF	Highest ranked team (Note: Based on 2012 Swedish club ranking. Teams in 2013 Allsvenskan and 2013 Superettan are not included in the ranking since they were automatically qualified for Round 2.)
Lindome GIF	Göteborgs FF	2013 Södercupen winner
Sävedalens IF	Göteborgs FF	2013 Östra Cupen winner
Torslanda IK	Göteborgs FF	2013 Hisingsmästerskapen winner
Utsiktens BK	Göteborgs FF	2013 Västra Cupen winner
Hyltebruks IF	Hallands FF	2012 Intersport Cup runner-up
Ullareds IK	Hallands FF	2012 Intersport Cup semi-finalist (Note: Received a place since winners Halmstads BK were automatically qualified for Round 2 as an Allsvenskan team.)
Lerkils IF	Hallands FF	2012 Intersport Cup semi-finalist
Hudiksvalls FF	Hälsinglands FF	Qualification tournament winner
IFK Östersund	Jämtland-Härjedalens FF	2013 Reaxcer Cup winner
Selånger FK	Medelpads FF	Highest ranked team
IFK Luleå	Norrbottens FF	2012 Coop Norrbotten Cup winner
Torns IF	Skånes FF	2012 Distriktsmästerskapet winner
Eskilsminne IF	Skånes FF	2012 Distriktsmästerskapet semi-finalist
Bunkeflo FF	Skånes FF	2012 Distriktsmästerskapet semi-finalist
Kvarnby IK	Skånes FF	2012 Distriktsmästerskapet quarter-finalist
IFK Hässleholm	Skånes FF	2012 Distriktsmästerskapet quarter-finalist
IFK Trelleborg	Skånes FF	2012 Distriktsmästerskapet quarter-finalist
Hittarps IK	Skånes FF	2012 Distriktsmästerskapet quarter-finalist
Lunds BK	Skånes FF	2012 Distriktsmästerskapet best round of 16
Kristianstads FF	Skånes FF	2012 Distriktsmästerskapet second best round of 16 (Note: Received a place since runners-up Helsingborgs IF were automatically qualified for Round 2 as an Allsvenskan team.)
Tenhults IF	Smålands FF	2012 Hyundai Cup winner
Vimmerby IF	Smålands FF	2012 Hyundai Cup runner-up
Lindsdals IF	Smålands FF	2012 Hyundai Cup semi-finalist
Råslätts SK	Smålands FF	2012 Hyundai Cup semi-finalist
Husqvarna FF	Smålands FF	2012 Hyundai Cup best quarter-finalist
Ljungby IF	Smålands FF	2012 Hyundai Cup 3rd best quarter-finalist
Västerviks FF	Smålands FF	2012 Hyundai Cup 4th best quarter-finalist (Note: Received a place since 2nd best placed quarter-finalists Oskarshamns AIK refused to enter Svenska Cupen.)
Eskilstuna City	Södermanlands FF	2013 Distriktsmästerskapet winner
Nyköpings BIS	Södermanlands FF	2013 Distriktsmästerskapet runner-up
Vasalunds IF	Stockholms FF	Highest ranked team
IK Frej	Stockholms FF	2nd highest ranked team
AFC United	Stockholms FF	3rd highest ranked team
Akropolis IF	Stockholms FF	4th highest ranked team
Sollentuna FF	Stockholms FF	5th highest ranked team
Enskede IK	Stockholms FF	6th highest ranked team 2012 Stockholm Cup runner-up
Karlbergs BK	Stockholms FF	7th highest ranked team
Värmdö IF	Stockholms FF	8th highest ranked team (Note: Received a place since 2012 Stockholm Cup runners-up Enskede IK was one of the 7th best ranked teams.)
IFK Aspudden-Tellus	Stockholms FF	2012 Stockholm Cup winner
IK Sirius	Upplands FF	Highest ranked team
Enköpings SK	Upplands FF	2nd highest ranked team
Sunnersta AIF	Upplands FF	2012 Upplandscupen winner
Karlstad BK	Värmlands FF	2012 Distriktsmästerskapet winner
Carlstad United	Värmlands FF	2012 Distriktsmästerskapet runner-up
Mariehem SK	Västerbottens FF	2012 Distriktsmästerskapet winner
Skövde AIK	Västergötlands FF	2012 Intersport Cup winner
Vänersborgs IF	Västergötlands FF	2012 Intersport Cup runner-up
Norrby IF	Västergötlands FF	2012 Intersport Cup semi-finalist
Åsarp-Trädet FK	Västergötlands FF	2012 Intersport Cup semi-finalist
Holmalunds IF	Västergötlands FF	2012 Intersport Cup best quarter-finalist
Tibro AIK	Västergötlands FF	2012 Intersport Cup 2nd best quarter-finalist
Västerås SK	Västmanlands FF	Highest ranked team
Härnösands FF	Ångermanlands FF	2013 Distriktsmästerskapet winner
IFK Kumla	Örebro Läns FF	Qualification tournament Group 1 winner
Rynninge IK	Örebro Läns FF	Qualification tournament Group 2 winner
IK Sleipner	Östergötland FF	2012 Östgötacupen runner-up
Linghems SK	Östergötland FF	2012 Östgötacupen semi-finalist (Note: Received a place since winners IFK Norrköping were automatically qualified for Round 2 as an Allsvenskan team.)
Grebo IK	Östergötland FF	2012 Östgötacupen semi-finalist

== Dalarnas FF qualification ==
The first round commenced on 10 March 2013 and the final was contested on 28 May 2013. The four highest ranked teams in Dalarnas FF (except IK Brage) entered in the quarter-finals. The number in brackets, indicate what tier of Swedish football each team competed in for the 2013 season.

10 March 2013 Round 1	IFK Hedemora (8)	1–6	IFK Mora (6)	Hedemora
14:15	Hansson 62'	Report	Grundtman 1', 5', 17'; Ekberg Enmalm 2', 49'; Nesset 53'	Stadium: Vasaliden Arena; Attendance: 20; Referee: Björn Andersson (Borlänge)

15 March 2013 Round 1	Boda Ore SK (8)	0–1	Vansbro AIK (6)	Mora
19:00		Report	Svensson 65'	Stadium: Prästholmens IP; Attendance: Unknown; Referee: Ola Ullbors (Mora)

15 March 2013 Round 1	Östansbo IS (6)	3–0 (w/o)	Ulfshyttans IF (6)	Ludvika
19:00		Report		Stadium: Lorensberga IP

15 March 2013 Round 1	Långshyttans AIK (9)	0–4	Korsnäs IF (5)	Hedemora
19:15		Report	Andreadis Panagiotidis 14'; Söderberg 19'; Güclü 78'; Folkesson 80'	Stadium: Vasaliden Arena; Attendance: 20; Referee: Almir Alisić (Borlänge)

23 March 2013 Quarter-finals	Korsnäs IF (5)	1–0	Avesta AIK (5)	Avesta
12:00	Forslund 39'	Report		Stadium: Avestavallen; Attendance: Unknown; Referee: Jörgen Edvardsson (Avesta)

25 March 2013 Quarter-finals	Dalkurd FF (3)	16–0	Östansbo IS (6)	Borlänge
18:00	Jagne 5', 23', 40', 48', 50'; Kizil 7', 78'; Medén 11', 45', 55', 62', 71'; Milli 27'; Ekblad 47'; Nouri 61'; Omeje 75'	Report		Stadium: Domnarvsvallen; Attendance: 36; Referee: Patrik Larsson (Borlänge)

2 April 2013 Quarter-finals	Vansbro AIK (6)	1–3 (a.e.t.)	Falu FK (5)	Leksand
19:00	Svensson 73'	Report	Meftah 65'; C. Villwock 111'; Göras 119'	Stadium: Konstgräset i Leksand; Attendance: 27; Referee: Mikael Lindfors (Avesta)

2 April 2013 Quarter-finals	IFK Mora (6)	3–5	Kvarnsvedens IK (4)	Mora
19:30	Lindh 16'; Ekberg Enmalm 40'; Grundtman 78'	Report	Jonasson 20'; Johansson 30', 83'; Laham 42'; Fyhr 74'	Stadium: Prästholmens IP; Attendance: 85; Referee: Morgan Kullberg (Mora)

30 April 2013 Semi-finals	Falu FK (5)	2–1	Kvarnsvedens IK (4)	Falun
19:15	Layouni 21'; Granberg 46'	Report	Hindrikes 85' (pen.)	Stadium: Kopparvallen; Attendance: 70; Referee: Patrik Larsson (Borlänge)

14 May 2013 Semi-finals	Korsnäs IF (5)	3–1	Dalkurd FF (3)	Falun
19:00	Forslund 9'; Stigsson Flygare 31'; Güclü 72'	Report	Istrefi 86'	Stadium: Dalavallen; Attendance: 147; Referee: Erik Nordqvist (Borlänge)

28 May 2013 Final	Falu FK (5)	2–3 (a.e.t.)	Korsnäs IF (5)	Falun
19:00	Layouni 33'; Hjertstrand 47'	Report	Andreadis Panagiotidis 72'; J. Wallén Ljunggren 80', 102' (pen.)	Stadium: Kopparvallen; Attendance: 153; Referee: Erik Nordqvist (Borlänge)

== Hälsinglands FF qualification ==
In this qualification the winner of 2012 Distriktsmästerskapet, Rengsjö SK played a match against the winner of 2013 Distriktsmästerskapet, Hudiksvalls FF. The match was played on 25 June 2013. The number in brackets, indicate what tier of Swedish football each team competed in for the 2013 season.

25 June 2013	Rengsjö SK (5)	0–4	Hudiksvalls FF (4)	Rengsjö
19:00		Report	Roos 24', 60'; Lööf 49'; Hafizović 76'	Stadium: Rengsjö IP; Attendance: Unknown; Referee: Håkan Lindqvist (Enånger)

== Örebro Läns FF qualification ==
The first matches were played on 27 February 2013 and the last match was played on 27 March 2013. The number in brackets, indicate what tier of Swedish football each team competed in for the 2013 season.

=== Group 1 ===
Pos	Team	Pld	W	D	L	GF	GA	GD	Pts	Qualification	IFKK	BKF	IFKÖ	ÖSIF
1	IFK Kumla (Q)	3	3	0	0	5	0	+5	9	Advanced to Round 1	—	2–0	2–0	—
2	BK Forward	3	2	0	1	7	4	+3	6		—	—	4–2	3–0
3	IFK Örebro	3	1	0	2	4	7	−3	3		—	—	—	2–1
4	Örebro Syrianska IF	3	0	0	3	1	6	−5	0		0–1	—	—	—

Rules for classification: 1) Points; 2) Goal difference; 3) Number of goals scored
(Q) Qualified for the phase indicated

3 March 2013 Matchday 1	Örebro Syrianska IF (5)	0–1	IFK Kumla (5)	Örebro
16:00		Report	Bogren 50'	Stadium: Karlslund Arena; Attendance: 50; Referee: Daniel Hansson (Örebro)

6 March 2013 Matchday 1	BK Forward (3)	4–2	IFK Örebro (6)	Örebro
19:30	Lamu 4', 77'; C. Hult Spansk 17'; Björndahl 56'	Report	E. Carlsson 52'; Adrian Carlsson 65'	Stadium: Behrn Arena; Attendance: 30; Referee: Salko Basić (Örebro)

27 February 2013 Matchday 2	IFK Kumla (5)	2–0	BK Forward (3)	Kumla
20:00	Arnold 31'; Nilsson 82'	Report		Stadium: Kumla IP; Attendance: 88; Referee: Salko Basić (Örebro)

9 March 2013 Matchday 2	IFK Örebro (6)	2–1	Örebro Syrianska IF (5)	Örebro
16:00	Adrian Carlsson; E. Carlsson	Report	Can	Stadium: Karlslund Arena; Attendance: Unknown; Referee: Kalle Jansson (Örebro)

23 March 2013 Matchday 3	IFK Kumla (5)	2–0	IFK Örebro (6)	Kumla
14:00	Bogren 52', 78'	Report		Stadium: Kumla IP; Attendance: 95; Referee: Samir Bahtijaragić (Örebro)

27 March 2013 Matchday 3	BK Forward (3)	3–0 (w/o)	Örebro Syrianska IF (5)	Örebro
19:30		Report		Stadium: Behrn Arena; Referee: Patrik Almkvist (Örebro)

=== Group 2 ===
Pos	Team	Pld	W	D	L	GF	GA	GD	Pts	Qualification	RIK	AIK	KIF	IKS
1	Rynninge IK (Q)	3	3	0	0	10	0	+10	9	Advanced to Round 1	—	—	2–0	3–0
2	Adolfsbergs IK	3	2	0	1	4	6	−2	6		0–5	—	—	—
3	Karlslunds IF	3	1	0	2	8	4	+4	3		—	1–2	—	7–0
4	IK Sturehov	3	0	0	3	0	12	−12	0		—	0–2	—	—

Rules for classification: 1) Points; 2) Goal difference; 3) Number of goals scored
(Q) Qualified for the phase indicated

27 February 2013 Matchday 1	Karlslunds IF (4)	7–0	IK Sturehov (6)	Örebro
18:15	Kuhi 13'; Lundholm 28', 34', 47'; Enblom 30'; Molin 49', 81'	Report		Stadium: Karlslund Arena; Attendance: 103; Referee: Johan Eriksson (Kumla)

12 March 2013 Matchday 1	Adolfsbergs IK (5)	0–5	Rynninge IK (4)	Örebro
18:45		Report	Pers 31'; Feysal Mustafe 43', 44', 57', 73'	Stadium: Pettersbergs IP; Attendance: Unknown; Referee: Samir Bahtijaragić (Örebro)

10 March 2013 Matchday 2	IK Sturehov (6)	0–2	Adolfsbergs IK (5)	Örebro
10:45		Report	Wetterberg 24'; Berg 57'	Stadium: Karlslund Arena; Attendance: 25; Referee: Patrik Almkvist (Örebro)

16 March 2013 Matchday 2	Rynninge IK (4)	2–0	Karlslunds IF (4)	Örebro
16:00	Klinton 15' (pen.); Pers 57'	Report		Stadium: Pettersbergs IP; Attendance: 100; Referee: Johan Eriksson (Kumla)

19 March 2013 Matchday 3	Rynninge IK (4)	3–0 (w/o)	IK Sturehov (6)	Örebro
18:00		Report		Stadium: Pettersbergs IP; Referee: Kalle Jansson (Örebro)

21 March 2013 Matchday 3	Karlslunds IF (4)	1–2	Adolfsbergs IK (5)	Örebro
18:00	Molin 53'	Report	Wetterberg 20'; Wångblad 49'	Stadium: Karlslund Arena; Attendance: 35; Referee: Johan Eriksson (Kumla)
