= 2014 Svenska Cupen final =

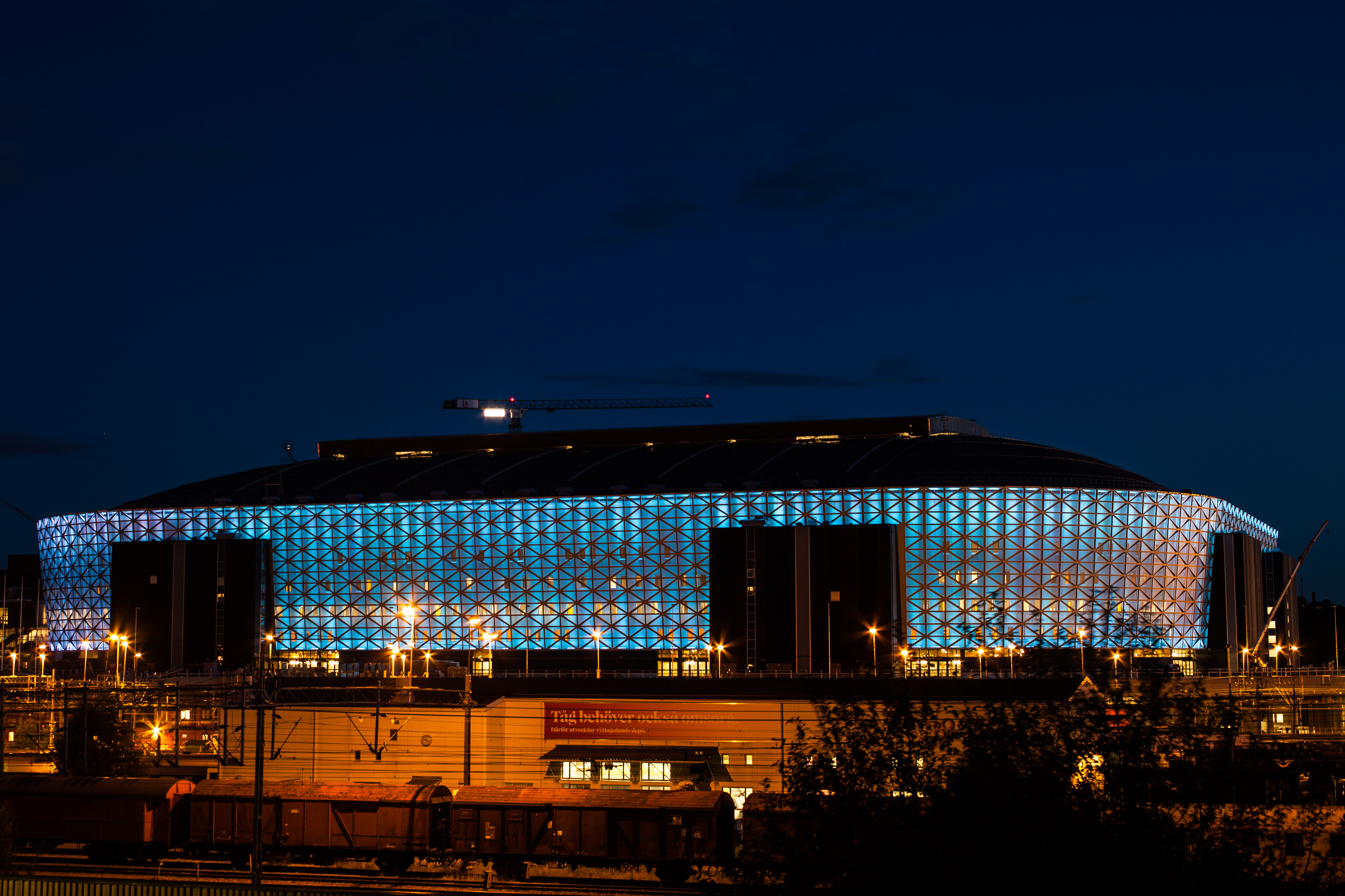
- Event: 2013–14 Svenska Cupen
Helsingborgs IF	IF Elfsborg
0	1
- Date: 18 May 2014
- Venue: Friends Arena, Solna
- Referee: Michael Lerjéus, (Skövde)
- Attendance: 3,423
- Weather: Cloudy; 19 °C (66 °F); 36% humidity

The 2014 Svenska Cupen final was played on 18 May 2014 at the national stadium Friends Arena in Solna, which hosted the final for the second time. The stadium is the home of the Sweden men's national football team and Allsvenskan club AIK. The final made its return to Solna for the second consecutive year. The final was the culmination of the 2013–14 Svenska Cupen.

== Road to the Final ==
Note: In all results below, the score of the finalist is given first.

Helsingborgs IF		Round	IF Elfsborg	
Opponent	Result	Qualifying stage	Opponent	Result
Härnösands FF	4–0 (A)	Round 2	Kristianstads FF	4–0 (A)
Opponent	Result	Group stage	Opponent	Result
Ljungskile SK	1–0 (H)	Matchday 1	Östersunds FK	3–0 (H)
Torslanda IK	5–0 (A)	Matchday 2	Rynninge IK	5–0 (A)
Syrianska FC	5–1 (H)	Matchday 3	Östers IF	2–0 (H)
Group 3 winner: Team / Pld / W / D / L / GF / GA / GD / Pts; Helsingborgs IF / 3 / 3 / 0 / 0 / 11 / 1 / +10 / 9; Ljungskile SK / 3 / 1 / 1 / 1 / 3 / 2 / +1 / 4; Torslanda IK / 3 / 1 / 0 / 2 / 1 / 7 / –6 / 3; Syrianska FC / 3 / 0 / 1 / 2 / 2 / 7 / –5 / 1		Final standings	Group 4 winner: Team / Pld / W / D / L / GF / GA / GD / Pts; IF Elfsborg / 3 / 3 / 0 / 0 / 10 / 0 / +10 / 9; Östers IF / 3 / 1 / 1 / 1 / 6 / 5 / +1 / 4; Östersunds FK / 3 / 1 / 0 / 2 / 6 / 8 / –2 / 3; Rynninge IK / 3 / 0 / 1 / 2 / 1 / 10 / –9 / 1	
Opponent	Result	Knockout stage	Opponent	Result
GAIS	2–1 (H)	Quarter-finals	BK Häcken	1–0 (H)
Malmö FF	2–0 (A)	Semi-finals	IK Sirius	4–1 (A)

== Match ==
=== Details ===
18 May 2014
17:00 UTC+2

Helsingborgs IF	0–1	IF Elfsborg
	Report	Nilsson 54'

Friends Arena, Solna
Attendance: 3,423
Referee: Michael Lerjéus (Skövde)

Helsingborgs IF	IF Elfsborg

GK	30	(Sweden) Pär Hansson (c)
RB	15	(Sweden) Emil Krafth	(yellow card) 83'
CB	26	(Sweden) Peter Larsson	(yellow card) 90+6'
CB	2	(Sweden) Carl Johansson
LB	21	(Sweden) Christoffer Andersson		(substituted off) 87'
DM	13	(Sweden) Alexander Achinioti-Jönsson
RM	7	(Sweden) Mattias Lindström		(substituted off) 65'
CM	55	(Sweden) Abdul Rahman Khalili
CM	11	(Iceland) Arnór Smárason	(yellow card) 90+2'
LM	25	(Ghana) David Accam
FW	10	(Brazil) Álvaro Santos		(substituted off) 65'
Substitutes:
GK	22	(Sweden) Andreas Linde
FW	9	(Sweden) Robin Simović		(substituted in) 65'
MF	20	(Ghana) Ema Boateng		(substituted in) 65'
MF	23	(Sweden) Daniel Nordmark
DF	28	(Finland) Jere Uronen		(substituted in) 87'
DF	29	(Sweden) Jesper Björkman
MF	31	(Sweden) Elias Andersson
Manager:
(Sweden) Roar Hansen

GK	1	(Denmark) Kevin Stuhr Ellegaard		(substituted off) 73'
RB	7	(Sweden) Johan Larsson (c)
CB	12	(Sweden) Sebastian Holmén	(yellow card) 59'
CB	6	(Sweden) Jon Jönsson
LB	23	(Sweden) Niklas Hult	(yellow card) 10'
CM	25	(Sweden) Marcus Rohdén	(yellow card) 36'
CM	19	(Sweden) Simon Hedlund	(yellow card) 69'
CM	21	(Norway) Henning Hauger
RF	16	(Sweden) Viktor Claesson		(substituted off) 83'
CF	9	(Sweden) Lasse Nilsson
LF	24	(Sweden) Viktor Prodell		(substituted off) 86'
Substitutes:
GK	30	(Lebanon) Abbas Hassan		(substituted in) 73'
FW	10	(Denmark) Mikkel Beckmann		(substituted in) 83'
DF	11	(Sweden) Daniel Mobaeck
MF	13	(Sweden) Arber Zeneli
DF	15	(Sweden) Andreas Klarström
FW	17	(Sweden) Per Frick		(substituted in) 86'
MF	20	(Sweden) Adam Lundqvist
Manager:
(Sweden) Klas Ingesson

Assistant referees:
Per Brogevik (Örebro)
Stefan Hallberg (Alingsås)
Fourth official:
Peter Magnusson (Stockholm)

Match rules

- 90 minutes.
- 30 minutes of extra time if necessary.
- Penalty shoot-out if scores still level.
- Seven named substitutes.
- Maximum of three substitutions.

== See also ==
- 2013–14 Svenska Cupen
