= Robin Olsen =

Swedish footballer (born 1990)

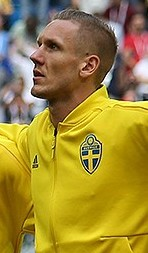
- Olsen with Sweden at the 2018 FIFA World Cup

Personal information
- Full name: Robin Patrick Olsen
- Date of birth: 8 January 1990 (age 36)
- Place of birth: Malmö, Sweden
- Height: 1.96 m (6 ft 5 in)
- Position: Goalkeeper

Team information
- Current team: Malmö FF
- Number: 1

Youth career
- 1997–2000: Malmö FF
- 2001: BK Olympic
- 2002–2006: FC Malmö
- 2006–2007: Bunkeflo IF

Senior career*
Years	Team	Apps	(Gls)
2007–2010	LB07	8	(0)
2010	→ Bunkeflo FF (loan)	18	(0)
2011	IFK Klagshamn	19	(0)
2012–2015	Malmö FF	53	(0)
2015–2016	PAOK	11	(0)
2016	→ Copenhagen (loan)	14	(0)
2016–2018	Copenhagen	57	(0)
2018–2022	Roma	27	(0)
2019–2020	→ Cagliari (loan)	17	(0)
2020–2021	→ Everton (loan)	7	(0)
2021–2022	→ Sheffield United (loan)	11	(0)
2022	→ Aston Villa (loan)	1	(0)
2022–2025	Aston Villa	14	(0)
2025–	Malmö FF	29	(0)

International career
2015–2025	Sweden	79	(0)
- * Club domestic league appearances and goals as of 19:16, 19 September 2026 (UTC)

Robin Patrick Olsen (Swedish pronunciation: [ˈrɔ̌bːɪn ˈʊ̌lːsɛn]; born 8 January 1990) is a Swedish professional footballer who plays as a goalkeeper for Allsvenskan club Malmö FF.

A full international between 2015 and 2025, Olsen won 79 caps for the Sweden national team. He represented his country at UEFA Euro 2016, the 2018 FIFA World Cup, and UEFA Euro 2020.

== Club career ==
=== Early life and career ===
Olsen's parents are Danish and he used to hold a Danish passport, but grew up in Sweden. He began his career playing for Malmö FF youth teams before moving to the academy of BK Olympic. At the age of 16 he joined IF Limhamn Bunkeflo and made his debut in the Swedish second tier an year later.

Following a knee injury he went on to play for Bunkeflo FF and IFK Klagshamn.

=== Malmö FF ===
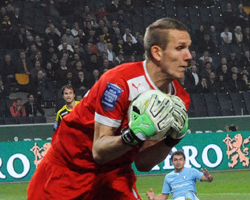
Olsen playing for Malmö FF in 2013

In 2011, Olsen re-joined Malmö FF, having been handpicked to the club by legendary goalkeeper and then goalkeeping coach Jonnie Fedel. He made his Allsvenskan debut on 1 October 2012 in an away fixture against Syrianska FC, when first choice goalkeeper Johan Dahlin was suspended, and kept a clean sheet as the match ended 2–0 in Malmö's favour. In the match on 5 April 2013 against Åtvidabergs FF Dahlin had to be substituted at half time for an injury and Olsen once again took his place. Olsen then managed to hold a clean sheet in the remaining part of the match as well as a further three matches before conceding a goal in stoppage time in his fourth match of the season in the away fixture against IFK Göteborg. Olsen kept Dahlin out of the starting eleven for some further matches before he was given the place on the bench once again. In total Olsen played 10 matches for Malmö FF during the league title winning 2013 season.

Prior to the start of the 2014 season the club sold Johan Dahlin, making Olsen the first choice goalkeeper. In the 2014 season, Olsen made 29 out of 30 league appearances and was a vital piece of the team that defended the club's league title and qualified for the group stage of the 2014–15 UEFA Champions League, as the first Swedish team in 15 years to do so. For his performances in the league Olsen was awarded Allsvenskan goalkeeper of the year. He was also nominated for Swedish goalkeeper of the year at Fotbollsgalan.

=== PAOK ===
Olsen signed a four-year contract with Greek club PAOK on 1 July 2015, with a transfer fee of nearly €650,000 being paid to Malmö.

=== Copenhagen ===
On 26 January 2016, Olsen would join F.C. Copenhagen on loan for six months, to cover for the injured Stephan Andersen. F.C. Copenhagen wanted to make the loan move permanent, and on 24 May 2016 Olsen signed a four-year contract with the club for a transfer fee of almost €600,000.

=== Roma ===
In July 2018, Olsen signed a five-year contract with the Italian club A.S. Roma with a reported fee worth up to €12,000,000, replacing the outgoing Alisson Becker. He marked his debut for the team with a clean sheet in a 1–0 away victory against Torino F.C. on 19 August 2018. Olsen was eventually replaced by veteran Antonio Mirante by interim manager Claudio Ranieri towards the end of the season. In total, Olsen made 35 appearances in his sole season at Roma, conceding 58 goals and keeping just seven clean sheets.

==== Loan to Cagliari ====
In August 2019, Olsen joined Cagliari Calcio on a season-long loan. On 25 November 2019, Olsen was sent off in an away game against US Lecce for pushing Gianluca Lapadula, who in turn had pushed Olsen for kicking the ball away. Both players were sent off, received a fine of €10,000, and Olsen was suspended for the next four Serie A matches.

==== Loan to Everton ====
Olsen joined Premier League club Everton on a season-long loan on 5 October 2020.

He played his first game for Everton on 1 November, away from home in the league against Newcastle United, in place of Jordan Pickford who had played 120 consecutive league games prior to that fixture. Everton lost the game 2–1.

Olsen played his second game for Everton on 16 December 2020, away from home in the league against Leicester City. Everton won the game 0–2 with Olsen keeping a clean sheet. Olsen also kept a clean sheet in his last game for Everton against Brighton & Hove Albion 12 April 2021. The goalkeeper impressed on the occasions he stepped into the side in place of Jordan Pickford. Despite Carlo Ancelotti's initial desire to bring the 31-year-old to Goodison Park on a permanent basis, the surprise exit of the Italian in the summer seemingly scuppered any hope of that taking place. While Everton instead brought both Asmir Begovic and Andy Lonergan to Merseyside to provide back-up to Pickford, Olsen opted to move to Sheffield United on loan.

==== Loan to Sheffield United ====
On 31 August 2021, Olsen joined Championship side Sheffield United. He made his debut on 14 September 2021, in a 2–2 draw against Preston North End. Olsen picked up an injury while on international duty in mid-November and did not play after that.

==== Loan to Aston Villa ====
On 18 January 2022, Olsen was recalled from his Sheffield United loan, to join Aston Villa on loan for the remainder of the 2021–22 season.

On 22 May 2022, 32-year-old Olsen made his first appearance for Aston Villa in a 3–2 away defeat to Manchester City on the final day of the season. The match was significant in the race between City and Liverpool, the three points leading to Manchester City winning the Premier League title. Amidst the post-match celebrations, Olsen was assaulted during a pitch invasion by Manchester City fans. Manchester City released a statement saying that "the club has launched an immediate investigation and once identified, the individual responsible will be issued with an indefinite stadium ban."

=== Aston Villa ===
On 4 June 2022, Olsen signed for Aston Villa on a permanent basis, for an undisclosed fee rumoured to be in the region of £3m. On 29 October 2022, he made his first appearance since signing for Villa permanently in an away defeat to Newcastle United, coming off the bench to replace Emiliano Martínez, who had suffered a suspected concussion.

At the end of season awards for the 2024–25 season, Aston Villa honoured Olsen with an award to recognise his service for the club, confirming he would be leaving once his contract expired at the end of the season.

=== Return to Malmö FF ===
On 26 May 2025, Malmö announced that they would be re-signing Olsen on a free transfer when the Swedish transfer window opens on 8 July 2025. Olsen made his second debut for the club on 12 July 2025, in a 3–1 Allsvenskan victory over IFK Norrköping.

== International career ==
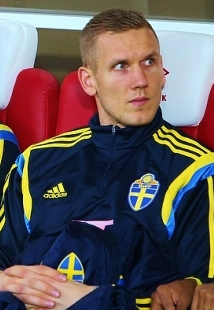
Olsen on the bench for Sweden in 2015

Olsen was eligible for international play for both Denmark and Sweden. When he came to Malmö FF he said that he would prefer to play for Denmark but in 2014 he opted to play for Sweden according to Danish international coach Morten Olsen. On 15 January 2015, the 25-year-old made his debut for Sweden in a friendly fixture against the Ivory Coast.

In May 2016, Olsen was called up for Sweden's squad for UEFA Euro 2016, as back-up keeper for Andreas Isaksson. After Sweden's early exit from the tournament, Isaksson retired and Olsen became Sweden's first-choice goalkeeper.

In May 2018 he was named in Sweden's 23-man squad for the 2018 FIFA World Cup in Russia. At the 2018 World Cup, Olsen started in all five games for Sweden as they were eliminated by England in the quarter-final. After impressive performances, Robin Olsen was included in L'Equipe's team of the tournament after the first round of games of Euro 2020.

On 30 September 2025, in the middle of the qualifying campaign for the 2026 FIFA World Cup, Olsen announced his immediate decision to retire from the national team as long as Jon Dahl Tomasson is coach. On 5 April 2026, Olsen confirmed his retirement from international football, even though that Sweden had replaced Tomasson with Graham Potter and qualified for the 2026 FIFA World Cup.

== Personal life ==
In March 2021, Olsen and his family were threatened with a machete by a masked gang during a raid on their home in Altrincham, Greater Manchester. The gang stole jewellery and a luxury watch during the burglary.

== Career statistics ==
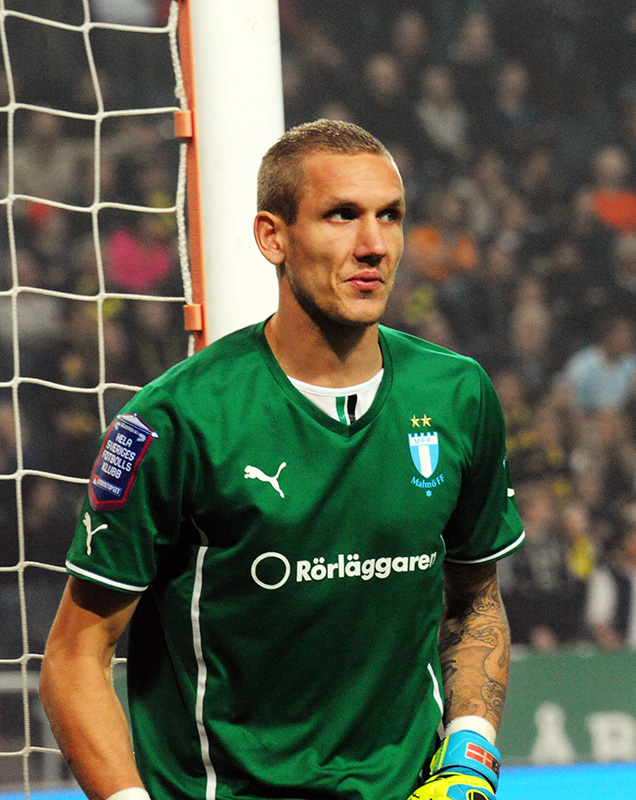
Olsen playing for Malmö FF in 2014

=== Club ===
As of match played 19 September 2026

Appearances and goals by club, season and competition
Club	Season	League			National cup (Note: Includes Swedish Cup, Greek Cup, Danish Cup, Coppa Italia, FA Cup)		League cup (Note: Includes EFL Cup)		Europe		Other		Total	
Club	Season	Division	Apps	Goals	Apps	Goals	Apps	Goals	Apps	Goals	Apps	Goals	Apps	Goals
Limhamn Bunkeflo	2007	Superettan	0	0	—		—		—		—		0	0
Limhamn Bunkeflo	2008	Superettan	0	0	—		—		—		—		0	0
Limhamn Bunkeflo	2009	Division 1 Södra	8	0	—		—		—		—		8	0
Limhamn Bunkeflo	Total		8	0	—		—		—		—		8	0
Bunkeflo FF	2010	Division 5 Skåne Sydvästra A	18	0	—		—		—		—		18	0
IFK Klagshamn	2011	Division 2 Södra Götaland	19	0	—		—		—		—		19	0
Malmö FF	2012	Allsvenskan	1	0	1	0	—		—		—		2	0
Malmö FF	2013	Allsvenskan	10	0	1	0	—		0	0	0	0	11	0
Malmö FF	2014	Allsvenskan	29	0	4	0	—		12 (Note: Appearances in UEFA Champions League)	0	0	0	45	0
Malmö FF	2015	Allsvenskan	13	0	4	0	—		0	0	—		17	0
Malmö FF	Total		53	0	10	0	—		12	0	—		75	0
PAOK	2015–16	Super League Greece	11	0	1	0	—		7 (Note: Appearances in UEFA Europa League)	0	—		19	0
Copenhagen (loan)	2015–16	Danish Superliga	14	0	0	0	—		0	0	—		14	0
Copenhagen	2016–17	Danish Superliga	33	0	0	0	—		15 (Note: Eleven appearances in UEFA Champions League, four appearances in UEFA Europa League)	0	—		48	0
Copenhagen	2017–18	Danish Superliga	24	0	1	0	—		12 (Note: Six appearances in UEFA Champions League, six appearances in UEFA Europa League)	0	—		37	0
Copenhagen	Total		57	0	1	0	—		27	0	—		85	0
Roma	2018–19	Serie A	27	0	2	0	—		6	0	—		35	0
Cagliari (loan)	2019–20	Serie A	17	0	2	0	—		—		—		19	0
Everton (loan)	2020–21	Premier League	7	0	3	0	1	0	—		—		11	0
Sheffield United (loan)	2021–22	Championship	11	0	0	0	0	0	—		—		11	0
Aston Villa (loan)	2021–22	Premier League	1	0	—		—		—		—		1	0
Aston Villa	2022–23	Premier League	4	0	1	0	1	0	—		—		6	0
Aston Villa	2023–24	Premier League	5	0	0	0	1	0	4 (Note: Appearances in UEFA Europa Conference League)	0	—		10	0
Aston Villa	2024–25	Premier League	5	0	1	0	0	0	0	0	—		6	0
Aston Villa	Total		14	0	2	0	2	0	4	0	—		22	0
Malmö FF	2025	Allsvenskan	14	0	0	0	—		9 (Note: Four appearances in UEFA Champions League, five appearances in UEFA Europa League)	0	—		23	0
Malmö FF	2026	Allsvenskan	15	0	4	0	—		—		—		19	0
Malmö FF	Total		29	0	4	0	—		9	0	—		42	0
Career total			285	0	25	0	3	0	63	0	0	0	376	0

=== International ===
Appearances and goals by national team and year
National team	Year	Apps	Goals
Sweden	2015	2	0
Sweden	2016	6	0
Sweden	2017	8	0
Sweden	2018	11	0
Sweden	2019	9	0
Sweden	2020	6	0
Sweden	2021	12	0
Sweden	2022	9	0
Sweden	2023	8	0
Sweden	2024	4	0
Sweden	2025	4	0
Total		79	0

== Honours ==
Bunkeflo FF

- Division 5 Skåne Sydvästra A: 2010

IFK Klagshamn

- Division 2 Södra Götaland: 2011

Malmö FF

- Allsvenskan: 2013, 2014
- Svenska Supercupen: 2013

Copenhagen

- Danish Superliga: 2015–16, 2016–17
- Danish Cup: 2015–16, 2016–17

Individual

- Allsvenskan goalkeeper of the year: 2014
- Swedish Goalkeeper of the Year: 2016, 2017, 2018, 2019, 2020, 2021, 2022, 2023
