= 2013 in Swedish football =

Football in Sweden
- Season: 2013

Men's football
- Allsvenskan: Malmö FF
- Superettan: Falkenbergs FF
- Division 1: IK Sirius (Norra); Husqvarna FF (Södra)
- Svenska Cupen: IFK Göteborg
- Svenska Supercupen: Malmö FF

The 2013 season was the 116th season of competitive football in Sweden. The competitive year started with the group stage of Svenska Cupen on 2 March. League competition started in early April with Allsvenskan on 31 March, Superettan on 6 April, Division 1 and lower men's leagues plus the Damallsvenskan on 13 April. Svenska Cupen ended with the final played at the national stadium Friends Arena on 26 May. Allsvenskan ended on 3 November, Superettan one day earlier on 2 November, Division 1 and lower men's leagues on 26 October and Damallsvenskan on 20 October. Qualification play-offs were held after the end of league play with the Allsvenskan play-offs being held on 7 and 10 November and the Superettan play-offs being held on 6 and 9 November. Svenska Supercupen was held on 10 November and was contested by the winner of Allsvenskan and Svenska Cupen. Sweden participated in qualification for the 2014 FIFA World Cup. Sweden also hosted UEFA Women's Euro 2013 between 10 and 28 July.

== Honours ==
=== Official titles ===
Title	Team	Reason
Swedish Champions 2013	Malmö FF	Winners of Allsvenskan
Swedish Cup Champions 2012–13	IFK Göteborg	Winners of Svenska Cupen
Swedish Super Cup Champions 2013	Malmö FF	Winners of Svenska Supercupen
Swedish Women's Champions 2013	LdB FC Malmö	Winners of Damallsvenskan

=== Competitions ===
Level	Competition	Team
1st level	2013 Allsvenskan	Malmö FF
2nd level	2013 Superettan	Falkenbergs FF
3rd level	2013 Swedish football Division 1 Norra	IK Sirius
3rd level	2013 Swedish football Division 1 Södra	Husqvarna FF
National cup	2012–13 Svenska Cupen	IFK Göteborg
Super cup	2013 Svenska Supercupen	Malmö FF
Women's 1st level	2013 Damallsvenskan	LdB FC Malmö

== Promotions, relegations and qualifications ==
=== Promotions ===
Promoted from	Promoted to	Team	Reason
2013 Superettan	2014 Allsvenskan	Falkenbergs FF	Winners
2013 Superettan	2014 Allsvenskan	Örebro SK	Runners-up
2013 Division 1 Norra	2014 Superettan	IK Sirius	Winners
2013 Division 1 Södra	2014 Superettan	Husqvarna FF	Winners
2013 Division 2	2014 Division 1 Norra	Skellefteå FF	Winners of group
2013 Division 2	2014 Division 1 Norra	Huddinge IF	Winners of group
2013 Division 2	2014 Division 1 Södra	Motala AIF	Winners of group
2013 Division 2	2014 Division 1 Södra	IFK Uddevalla	Winners of group
2013 Division 2	2014 Division 1 Södra	Norrby IF	Winners of group
2013 Division 2	2014 Division 1 Södra	Oskarshamns AIK	Winners of group

=== Relegations ===
Relegated from	Relegated to	Team	Reason
2013 Allsvenskan	2014 Superettan	Östers IF	15th team
2013 Allsvenskan	2014 Superettan	Syrianska FC	16th team
2013 Superettan	2014 Division 1 Södra	Örgryte IS	15th team
2013 Superettan	2014 Division 1 Norra	IK Brage	16th team
2013 Division 1 Norra	2014 Division 2	Sandvikens IF	12th team
2013 Division 1 Norra	2014 Division 2	Selånger FK	13th team
2013 Division 1 Norra	2014 Division 2	Eskilstuna City	14th team
2013 Division 1 Södra	2014 Division 2	Torslanda IK	12th team
2013 Division 1 Södra	2014 Division 2	IF Limhamn Bunkeflo	13th team
2013 Division 1 Södra	2014 Division 2	Karlstad BK	14th team

=== International qualifications ===
Qualified for	Enters	Team	Reason
2014–15 UEFA Champions League	2nd qual. round	Malmö FF	Winners of 2013 Allsvenskan
2014–15 UEFA Europa League	2nd qual. round	AIK	Runners-up of 2013 Allsvenskan
2014–15 UEFA Europa League	2nd qual. round	IF Elfsborg	Winners of 2013–14 Svenska Cupen
2014–15 UEFA Europa League	1st qual. round	IFK Göteborg	3rd team in 2013 Allsvenskan
2014–15 UEFA Women's Champions League	Round of 32	FC Rosengård	Winners of 2013 Damallsvenskan (as LdB FC Malmö)
2014–15 UEFA Women's Champions League	Round of 32	Tyresö FF	Runners-up of 2013 Damallsvenskan

== Domestic results ==
=== 2013 Allsvenskan ===
Locations of the 2013 Allsvenskan teams

Pos	Team	Pld	W	D	L	GF	GA	GD	Pts	Qualification or relegation
1	Malmö FF (C)	30	19	6	5	56	30	+26	63	Qualification to Champions League second qualifying round
2	AIK	30	17	7	6	54	32	+22	58	Qualification to Europa League second qualifying round
3	IFK Göteborg	30	16	6	8	49	31	+18	54	Qualification to Europa League first qualifying round
4	Kalmar FF	30	14	10	6	35	26	+9	52	
5	Helsingborgs IF	30	14	7	9	61	41	+20	49	
6	IF Elfsborg	30	12	10	8	49	34	+15	46	Qualification to Europa League second qualifying round (Note: IF Elfsborg qualified for the 2014–15 UEFA Europa League second qualifying round by winning the 2013–14 Svenska Cupen.)
7	Djurgårdens IF	30	12	8	10	38	44	−6	44	
8	Åtvidabergs FF	30	11	7	12	37	37	0	40	
9	IFK Norrköping	30	11	6	13	45	47	−2	39	
10	BK Häcken	30	10	7	13	37	41	−4	37	
11	Mjällby AIF	30	10	6	14	46	47	−1	36	
12	Gefle IF	30	7	13	10	34	42	−8	34	
13	IF Brommapojkarna	30	8	8	14	33	54	−21	32	Qualification to Europa League first qualifying round (Note: Sweden was among the best three associations in the UEFA Fair Play ranking and thus received an additional spot in the first qualifying round of the Europa League, IF Brommapojkarna received the qualifying spot for their ranking in Allsvenskans Fair Play ranking.)
14	Halmstads BK (O)	30	7	10	13	32	46	−14	31	Qualification to Relegation play-offs
15	Östers IF (R)	30	6	10	14	27	43	−16	28	Relegation to Superettan
16	Syrianska FC (R)	30	3	5	22	26	64	−38	14	Relegation to Superettan

Source: svenskfotboll.se (in Swedish)
Rules for classification: 1) points; 2) goal difference; 3) number of goals scored.
(C) Champions; (O) Play-off winners; (R) Relegated

=== 2013 Allsvenskan qualification play-offs ===
6 November 2013
18:30 UTC+1

GIF Sundsvall	1 – 1	Halmstads BK
Sliper 2'	Report	Baldvinsson 57'

Norrporten Arena, Sundsvall
Attendance: 3,097
Referee: Johan Hamlin (Bro)

10 November 2013
15:30 UTC+1

Halmstads BK	2 – 1	GIF Sundsvall
Boman 53', 57'	Report	Dibba 14'

Örjans Vall, Halmstad
Attendance: 5,135
Referee: Jonas Eriksson (Stockholm)

Halmstads BK won 3–2 on aggregate.

=== 2013 Superettan ===
Location of the 2013 Superettan teams

Pos	Team	Pld	W	D	L	GF	GA	GD	Pts	Promotion, qualification or relegation
1	Falkenbergs FF (C, P)	30	19	5	6	63	31	+32	62	Promotion to Allsvenskan
2	Örebro SK (P)	30	17	10	3	52	21	+31	61	Promotion to Allsvenskan
3	GIF Sundsvall	30	16	10	4	54	35	+19	58	Qualification to Promotion playoffs
4	Degerfors IF	30	14	10	6	52	41	+11	52	
5	Hammarby IF	30	13	8	9	34	28	+6	47	
6	Ängelholms FF	30	11	10	9	55	47	+8	43	
7	GAIS	30	12	7	11	45	47	−2	43	
8	Assyriska FF	30	12	6	12	42	44	−2	42	
9	Ljungskile SK	30	12	3	15	34	31	+3	39	
10	Östersunds FK	30	10	9	11	39	38	+1	39	
11	Jönköpings Södra IF	30	11	5	14	39	44	−5	38	
12	Landskrona BoIS	30	9	5	16	40	48	−8	32	
13	Varbergs BoIS (O)	30	9	5	16	47	65	−18	32	Qualification to Relegation playoffs
14	IFK Värnamo (O)	30	7	10	13	30	51	−21	31	Qualification to Relegation playoffs
15	Örgryte IS (R)	30	5	13	12	23	40	−17	28	Relegation to Division 1
16	IK Brage (R)	30	2	6	22	21	59	−38	12	Relegation to Division 1

Source: svenskfotboll.se (in Swedish)
Rules for classification: 1) points; 2) goal difference; 3) number of goals scored.
(C) Champions; (O) Play-off winners; (P) Promoted; (R) Relegated

=== 2013 Superettan qualification play-offs ===
6 November 2013
19:00 UTC+1

Dalkurd FF	1 – 0	IFK Värnamo
Sulaka 91'	Report

Domnarvsvallen, Borlänge
Attendance: 1,420
Referee: Lars Olsson (Umeå)
6 November 2013
19:00 UTC+1

IK Oddevold	0 – 1	Varbergs BoIS
	Report	Koroma 4'

Rimnersvallen, Uddevalla
Attendance: 1,479
Referee: Robert Daradic (Helsingborg)

9 November 2013
15:00 UTC+1

IFK Värnamo	5 – 1	Dalkurd FF
Kamara 6', 8'; Kozica 38', 71', 79'	Report	Dauda Omeje 39'

Finnvedsvallen, Värnamo
Attendance: 1,480
Referee: Jim Petersson (Motala)

IFK Värnamo won 5–2 on aggregate.

9 November 2013
15:00 UTC+1

Varbergs BoIS	2 – 1	IK Oddevold
Söderström 54'; Altemark Vanneryr 90'	Report	Selmani 15' (pen.)

Påskbergsvallen, Varberg
Attendance: 2,016
Referee: Magnus Ahlsén (Linköping)

Varbergs BoIS won 3–1 on aggregate.

=== 2013 Division 1 Norra ===
Location of the 2013 Division 1 teams. Division 1 Norra are red dots while Division 1 Södra are green dots.

Pos	Team	Pld	W	D	L	GF	GA	GD	Pts	Qualification or relegation
1	IK Sirius (C, P)	26	21	5	0	79	16	+63	68	Promotion to Superettan
2	Dalkurd FF	26	15	5	6	48	25	+23	50	Qualification to Promotion playoffs
3	Nyköpings BIS	26	15	4	7	43	26	+17	49	
4	BK Forward	26	10	11	5	45	28	+17	41	
5	IFK Luleå	26	11	6	9	45	46	−1	39	
6	Umeå FC	26	11	4	11	42	37	+5	37	
7	Vasalunds IF	26	11	2	13	36	38	−2	35	
8	IK Frej	26	10	5	11	30	39	−9	35	
9	Valsta Syrianska IK	26	9	4	13	31	48	−17	31	
10	AFC United	26	8	6	12	32	40	−8	30	
11	Västerås SK	26	8	6	12	31	52	−21	30	
12	Sandvikens IF (R)	26	7	6	13	31	45	−14	27	Relegation to Division 2
13	Selånger FK (R)	26	5	5	16	25	46	−21	20	Relegation to Division 2
14	Eskilstuna City (R)	26	4	5	17	30	62	−32	17	Relegation to Division 2

Source: svenskfotboll.se (in Swedish)
Rules for classification: 1) points; 2) goal difference; 3) number of goals scored.
(C) Champions; (P) Promoted; (R) Relegated

=== 2013 Division 1 Södra ===
Pos	Team	Pld	W	D	L	GF	GA	GD	Pts	Qualification or relegation
1	Husqvarna FF (C, P)	26	17	5	4	42	17	+25	56	Promotion to Superettan
2	IK Oddevold	26	14	7	5	49	29	+20	49	Qualification to Promotion playoffs
3	Trelleborgs FF	26	14	3	9	41	38	+3	45	
4	IS Halmia	26	12	7	7	40	30	+10	43	
5	Utsiktens BK	26	11	8	7	33	29	+4	41	
6	FC Trollhättan	26	12	5	9	39	36	+3	41	
7	IF Sylvia	26	10	8	8	44	41	+3	38	
8	Qviding FIF	26	9	7	10	34	36	−2	34	
9	Skövde AIK	26	9	6	11	34	36	−2	33	
10	Lunds BK	26	9	5	12	46	41	+5	32	
11	Kristianstads FF	26	9	4	13	38	43	−5	31	
12	Torslanda IK (R)	26	6	5	15	24	39	−15	23	Relegation to Division 2
13	IF Limhamn Bunkeflo (R)	26	6	5	15	30	56	−26	23	Relegation to Division 2
14	Karlstad BK (R)	26	4	5	17	25	48	−23	17	Relegation to Division 2

Source: svenskfotboll.se (in Swedish)
Rules for classification: 1) points; 2) goal difference; 3) number of goals scored.
(C) Champions; (P) Promoted; (R) Relegated

=== 2012–13 Svenska Cupen ===
==== Quarter-finals ====
3 April 2013
18:00 UTC+2

Helsingborgs IF	0 – 1	IFK Göteborg
	Report	Haglund 4'

Olympia, Helsingborg
Attendance: 4,031
Referee: Tobias Mattsson (Karlstad)

3 April 2013
18:00 UTC+2

Falkenbergs FF	0 – 1	Örgryte IS
	Report	Wallén 50'

Växjö Tipshall, Växjö
Attendance: 350
Referee: Kristoffer Karlsson (Malmö)

4 April 2013
17:30 UTC+2

IFK Norrköping	0 – 0 (a.e.t.)	Djurgårdens IF
	Report
Penalties
Þorvaldsson (penalty scored); Telo (penalty scored); Gerson (penalty scored); Thelin (penalty scored); Luts (penalty missed)	4 – 5	(penalty scored) Johansson; (penalty scored) Fejzullahu; (penalty scored) Jawo; (penalty scored) Oyal; (penalty scored) Arvidsson

Idrottsparken, Norrköping
Attendance: 2,306
Referee: Martin Strömbergsson (Gävle)

4 April 2013
17:30 UTC+2

Östers IF	2 – 1	IK Sirius
Persson 16'; Söderberg 76'	Report	Björkebaum 79'

Växjö Tipshall, Växjö
Attendance: 1,267
Referee: Bojan Pandzić (Gothenburg)

==== Semi-finals ====
1 May 2013
13:30 UTC+2

Djurgårdens IF	1 – 0	Örgryte IS
Johansson 59'	Report

Stockholm Stadion, Stockholm
Attendance: 7,126
Referee: Martin Strömbergsson (Gävle)

1 May 2013
13:30 UTC+2

Östers IF	1 – 4	IFK Göteborg
Robledo 50'	Report	Hysén 9', 52'; Moberg Karlsson 69', 81'

Myresjöhus Arena, Växjö
Attendance: 6,047
Referee: Michael Lerjéus (Skövde)

==== Final ====
26 May 2013
17:00 UTC+2

Djurgårdens IF	1 – 1 (a.e.t.)	IFK Göteborg
Amartey 52'	Report	Hysén 6'
Penalties
Jawo (penalty missed); Johansson (penalty scored); Solignac (penalty missed); Nymann (penalty missed)	1 – 3	(penalty scored) Haglund; (penalty missed) Bjärsmyr; (penalty scored) Dyrestam; (penalty scored) Farnerud

Friends Arena, Solna
Attendance: 21,819
Referee: Stefan Johannesson (Täby)

=== 2013 Svenska Supercupen ===
10 November 2013
18:00 UTC+1

Malmö FF	3 – 2	IFK Göteborg
Forsberg 42', 48'; Molins 90'	Report	Haglund 45'; Vibe 55'

Swedbank Stadion, Malmö
Attendance: 2,787
Referee: Andreas Ekberg (Lund)

== National team fixtures and results ==
23 January 2013
16:00 UTC+7
2013 King's Cup Semi-finals
№ 958

Sweden	1 – 1	North Korea
Fejzullahu 56'	Report	Hong Kum-Song 48'
Penalties
Svensson (penalty scored); Majstorović (penalty scored); Hysén (penalty scored); P. Jansson (penalty scored)	4 – 1	(penalty missed) Jang Kuk-Chol; (penalty missed) Kang Kuk-Chol; (penalty scored) Kim Chol-Bom

700th Anniversary Stadium, Chiang Mai
Attendance: 500
Referee: Mongkolchai Pechsri (Thailand)

26 January 2013
17:00 UTC+7
2013 King's Cup Final
№ 959

Sweden	3 – 0	Finland
Hysén 23'; Quaison 73'; Svensson 90'	Report

700th Anniversary Stadium, Chiang Mai
Attendance: 5,000
Referee: Chaiya Mahapab (Thailand)

6 February 2013
20:30 UTC+1
Friendly
№ 960

Sweden	2 – 3	Argentina
J. Olsson 17'; Elm 90+5'	Report	Lustig 3' (o.g.); Agüero 19'; Higuaín 23'

Friends Arena, Solna
Attendance: 49,646
Referee: Antony Gautier (France)

22 March 2013
20:45 UTC+1
2014 World Cup qualification
№ 961

Sweden	0 – 0	Republic of Ireland
	Report

Friends Arena, Solna
Attendance: 49,436
Referee: Alberto Undiano Mallenco (Spain)

26 March 2013
20:15 UTC+1
Friendly
№ 962

Slovakia	0 – 0	Sweden
	Report

Štadión pod Dubňom, Žilina
Attendance: 3,123
Referee: Gerhard Grobelnik (Austria)

3 June 2013
19:00 UTC+2
Friendly
№ 963

Sweden	1 – 0	North Macedonia
Kačaniklić 39'	Report

Swedbank Stadion, Malmö
Attendance: 14,459
Referee: Pavel Královec (Czech Republic)

7 June 2013
20:45 UTC+2
2014 World Cup qualification
№ 964

Austria	2 – 1	Sweden
Alaba 26' (pen.); Janko 32'	Report	Elmander 82'

Ernst-Happel-Stadion, Vienna
Attendance: 48,500
Referee: Gianluca Rocchi (Italy)

11 June 2013
19:15 UTC+2
2014 World Cup qualification
№ 965

Sweden	2 – 0	Faroe Islands
Ibrahimović 35', 82' (pen.)	Report

Friends Arena, Solna
Attendance: 32,858
Referee: Nikolay Yordanov (Bulgaria)

14 August 2013
20:00 UTC+2
Friendly
№ 966

Sweden	4 – 2	Norway
Ibrahimović 2', 28', 57'; Svensson 75'	Report	Abdellaoue 38' (pen.); Johansen 43'

Friends Arena, Solna
Attendance: 13,438
Referee: Michael Oliver (England)

6 September 2013
19:45 UTC+1
2014 World Cup qualification
№ 967

Republic of Ireland	1 – 2	Sweden
Keane 21'	Report	Elmander 33'; Svensson 57'

Aviva Stadium, Dublin
Attendance: 49,500
Referee: Damir Skomina (Slovenia)

10 September 2013
22:00 UTC+6
2014 World Cup qualification
№ 968

Kazakhstan	0 – 1	Sweden
	Report	Ibrahimović 1'

Astana Arena, Astana
Attendance: 24,000
Referee: Miroslav Zelinka (Czech Republic)

11 October 2013
20:45 UTC+2
2014 World Cup qualification
№ 969

Sweden	2 – 1	Austria
M. Olsson 56'; Ibrahimović 86'	Report	Harnik 29'

Friends Arena, Solna
Attendance: 49,416
Referee: Cüneyt Çakır (Turkey)

15 October 2013
20:45 UTC+2
2014 World Cup qualification
№ 970

Sweden	3 – 5	Germany
Hysén 6', 69'; Kačaniklić 42'	Report	Özil 45'; Götze 53'; Schürrle 57', 66', 76'

Friends Arena, Solna
Attendance: 49,251
Referee: Willie Collum (Scotland)

15 November 2013
19:45 UTC 0
2014 World Cup qualification, second round
№ 971

Portugal	1 – 0	Sweden
Ronaldo 82'	Report

Estádio da Luz, Lisbon
Attendance: 61,467
Referee: Nicola Rizzoli (Italy)

19 November 2013
20:45 UTC+1
2014 World Cup qualification, second round
№ 972

Sweden	2 – 3	Portugal
Ibrahimović 68', 72'	Report	Ronaldo 50', 77', 79'

Friends Arena, Solna
Attendance: 49,766
Referee: Howard Webb (England)

=== Goalscorers ===
Rank	Player	Club	Goals
1	Zlatan Ibrahimović	(France) Paris Saint-Germain	9
2	Tobias Hysén	(Sweden) IFK Göteborg	3
2	Anders Svensson	(Sweden) IF Elfsborg	3
4	Johan Elmander	(Turkey) Galatasaray (England) Norwich City	2
4	Alexander Kačaniklić	(England) Fulham	2
6	Rasmus Elm	(Russia) CSKA Moscow	1
6	Erton Fejzullahu	(Sweden) Djurgårdens IF	1
6	Jonas Olsson	(England) West Bromwich Albion	1
6	Martin Olsson	(England) Norwich City	1
6	Robin Quaison	(Sweden) AIK	1

==== Own goals ====
Player	Club	Own goals	Playing against
(Sweden) Mikael Lustig	(Scotland) Celtic	1	Argentina

== Swedish clubs' performance in Europe ==
These are the results of the Swedish teams in European competitions during the 2013–14 season. (Swedish team score displayed first)

Team	Contest	Round	Opponent	1st leg score*	2nd leg score**	Aggregate score
IF Elfsborg	UEFA Champions League	Second qualifying round	(Latvia) Daugava Daugavpils	7–1	4–0	W 11–1
IF Elfsborg	UEFA Champions League	Third qualifying round	(Scotland) Celtic	0–1	0–0	L 0–1
IF Elfsborg	UEFA Europa League	Play-off round	(Denmark) Nordsjælland	1–1	1–0	W 2–1
IF Elfsborg	UEFA Europa League	Group stage	(Belgium) Standard Liège	1–1	3–1	None
IF Elfsborg	UEFA Europa League	Group stage	(Austria) Red Bull Salzburg	0–1	0–4	None
IF Elfsborg	UEFA Europa League	Group stage	(Denmark) Esbjerg	1–2	0–1	None
BK Häcken	UEFA Europa League	Second qualifying round	(Czech Republic) Sparta Prague	2–2	1–0	W 3–2
BK Häcken	UEFA Europa League	Third qualifying round	(Switzerland) Thun	1–2	0–1	L 1–3
Malmö FF	UEFA Europa League	First qualifying round	(Republic of Ireland) Drogheda United	0–0	2–0	W 2–0
Malmö FF	UEFA Europa League	Second qualifying round	(Scotland) Hibernian	2–0	7–0	W 9–0
Malmö FF	UEFA Europa League	Third qualifying round	(England) Swansea City	0–4	0–0	L 0–4
Gefle IF	UEFA Europa League	First qualifying round	(Estonia) Narva Trans	3–0	5–1	W 8–1
Gefle IF	UEFA Europa League	Second qualifying round	(Cyprus) Anorthosis	0–3	4–0	W 4–3
Gefle IF	UEFA Europa League	Third qualifying round	(Azerbaijan) Qarabağ	0–1	0–2	L 0–3
IFK Göteborg	UEFA Europa League	Second qualifying round	(Slovakia) Trenčín	0–0	1–2	L 1–2
Tyresö FF	UEFA Women's Champions League	Round of 32	(France) Paris Saint-Germain	2–1	0–0	W 2–1
Tyresö FF	UEFA Women's Champions League	Round of 16	(Denmark) Fortuna Hjørring	2–1	4–0	W 6–1
Tyresö FF	UEFA Women's Champions League	Quarterfinals	(Austria) Neulengbach	8–1	0–0	W 8–1
Tyresö FF	UEFA Women's Champions League	Semifinals	(England) Birmingham	0–0	3–0	W 3–0
Tyresö FF	UEFA Women's Champions League	Final	(Germany) Wolfsburg	3–4		None
LdB FC Malmö	UEFA Women's Champions League	Round of 32	(Norway) Lillestrøm	3–1	5–0	W 8–1
LdB FC Malmö	UEFA Women's Champions League	Round of 16	(Germany) Wolfsburg	1–2	1–3	L 2–5

* For group games in Europa League, score in home game is displayed
** For group games in Europa League, score in away game is displayed
