= Jonathan Lundberg =

Swedish footballer

Personal information
- Full name: Emil Jonathan Lundberg
- Date of birth: 27 October 1997 (age 29)
- Place of birth: Sweden
- Height: 1.85 m (6 ft 1 in)
- Position: Forward

Team information
- Current team: Karlslunds IF
- Number: 13

Youth career
- –2013: Rynninge IK
- 2013–2015: Örebro SK

Senior career*
Years	Team	Apps	(Gls)
2015–2017	Örebro SK	11	(0)
2018–2019	Rynninge IK	57	(8)
2020–	Karlslunds IF	0	(0)
- * Club domestic league appearances and goals as of 22:31, 9 April 2020 (UTC)

Jonathan Lundberg (born 27 October 1997) is a Swedish footballer who plays for Karlslunds IF as a forward.

== Career ==
=== Karlslunds IF ===
Joining Rynninge IK in December 2017, he played for the club until the end of 2019. He then joined fellow Division 1 Norra side Karlslunds IF HFK, signing with the club on 1 December 2019.
