= Månz Karlsson =

Swedish footballer

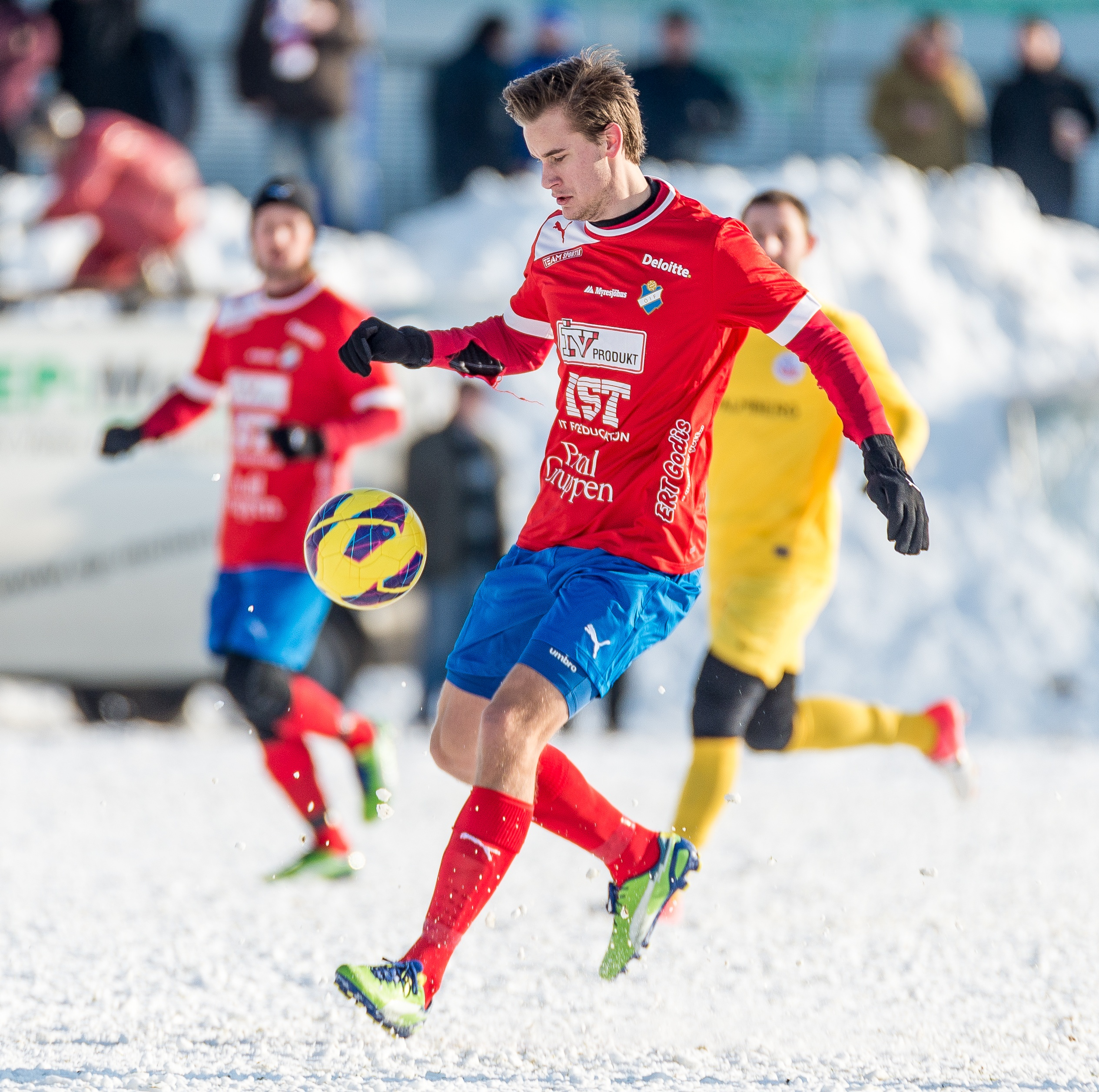
- Månz Karlsson playing for Östers IF.

Personal information
- Full name: Axel Månz Fabian Karlsson
- Date of birth: 4 April 1989 (age 37)
- Place of birth: Växjö, Sweden
- Height: 1.91 m (6 ft 3 in)
- Position: Defender

Team information
- Current team: Kosta IF

Youth career
- –2003: Växjö Norra IF
- 2003–2008: Östers IF

Senior career*
Years	Team	Apps	(Gls)
2008–2013	Östers IF	125	(3)
2014–2016	Åtvidabergs FF	76	(1)
2017–2023	Östers IF	176	(4)
2024–	Kosta IF		
- * Club domestic league appearances and goals as of 17 November 2023

Månz Karlsson (born 4 April 1989) is a Swedish footballer who plays for Kosta IF as a defender. Karlsson's nicknamed Elaka Månz (Mean Månz), because of his tackles that often generated yellow cards.

== Club career ==
=== Östers IF ===
Born and raised in Växjö, Karlsson played youth level football for both Växjö Norra IF and later Östers IF. He got promoted to the first team of Östers IF in 2008, when they played in Division 1. He managed to help the team advance to Allsvenskan for the 2013 season, in which he played 28 games and scored two goals. Östers IF got relegated to Superettan the same year.

=== Åtvidabergs FF ===
Karlsson wanted to continue playing first tier football, so he decided to move from Växjö to play with Åtvidabergs FF for the 2014 season. He signed a three-year-long contract with the club. His first goal for Åtvidabergs FF came against Gefle IF on 21 April 2014.

== Honours ==
Östers IF

- Division 1 Södra: 2009
- Superettan: 2012
