= Andreas Haddad =

Swedish-Assyrian footballer

Personal information
- Full name: Andreas Daniel Gabriel Haddad
- Date of birth: 5 May 1982 (age 44)
- Place of birth: Spånga, Sweden
- Height: 1.89 m (6 ft 2 1/2 in)
- Position: Striker

Youth career
- AIK
- Spårvägens FF

Senior career*
| Years | Team | Apps | (Gls) |
| 2001–2005 | Assyriska | 85 | (23) |
| 2005 | → Lillestrøm SK (loan) | 6 | (0) |
| 2006 | Lillestrøm SK | 2 | (0) |
| 2006–2007 | Assyriska | 20 | (13) |
| 2008 | Vejle Boldklub | 0 | (0) |
| 2009 | Qviding FIF | 8 | (1) |
| 2009–2010 | Al-Oruba SC | 8 | (7) |
| 2010 | Assyriska | 14 | (8) |
| 2011–2012 | Örebro SK | 8 | (3) |
| 2013 | Brommapojkarna | 11 | (5) |
| 2013–2014 | Hammarby IF | 20 | (4) |
| 2015 | Assyriska | 16 | (0) |
| 2017 | Assyriska | 2 | (0) |

Managerial career
- 2018–: Södertälje FK
- * Club domestic league appearances and goals as of 30 November 2017

Andreas Daniel Gabriel Haddad (Arabic: أندرياس دانييل غابرييل حداد), formerly Andreas Daniel Gabriel Turander (Arabic: أندرياس دانييل غابرييل توراندير; born on 5 May 1982) is a Swedish-Assyrian retired footballer who played as a striker. He is currently the manager of Södertälje FK.

In January 2008, he signed a half-year contract with the club, but the contract was cancelled only two months later due to injuries. Haddad has also played for Swedish side Assyriska Föreningen, and for a short period in Norwegian side Lillestrøm SK on loan and then signed for them in 2006. He has yet to earn a call up to the Sweden national team and can thus play as he chooses for Turkey or Iraq.

He most recently played for Swedish club Assyriska, but left the club in December 2015.

In Lillestrøm SK, Haddad is regarded as cult hero. During his time at the club a subgroup of the official fanclub Kanari-Fansen was formed, called Team Haddad. Even though his spell at the club was a short one, he is remembered as a gifted player.
