= Östansbo IS =

Swedish football club

- Full name: Östansbo Idrottssällskap
- Founded: 1931
- Ground: Björkliden; Ludvika; Sweden
- Chairman: Berth Rönnberg
- League: Division 4 Dalarna
Home colours	Away colours

Östansbo IS is a Swedish football club located in Ludvika.

== Background ==
Östansbo IS plays in Division 4 Dalarna which is the sixth tier of Swedish football. They play their home matches at the Björkliden in Ludvika.

The club is affiliated to Dalarnas Fotbollförbund. Östansbo IS have competed in the Svenska Cupen on 5 occasions and have played 6 matches in the competition.

== Season to season ==
Season	Level	Division	Section	Position	Movements
1999	Tier 7	Division 6	Dalarna Västra	4th	
2000	Tier 7	Division 6	Dalarna Västra	3rd	
2001	Tier 7	Division 6	Dalarna Södra	2nd	Promotion Playoffs – Promoted
2002	Tier 6	Division 5	Dalarna Södra	6th	
2003	Tier 6	Division 5	Dalarna Södra	1st	Promoted
2004	Tier 5	Division 4	Dalarna	5th	
2005	Tier 5	Division 4	Dalarna	4th	
2006*	Tier 6	Division 4	Dalarna	8th	
2007	Tier 6	Division 4	Dalarna	9th	Relegated
2008	Tier 7	Division 5	Dalarna Södra	7th	
2009	Tier 7	Division 5	Dalarna Södra	2nd	Promoted
2010	Tier 6	Division 4	Dalarna	8th	
2011	Tier 6	Division 4	Dalarna	11th	Relegated

* League restructuring in 2006 resulted in a new division being created at Tier 3 and subsequent divisions dropping a level.
