= Åsarp-Trädet FK =

Swedish football club

- Full name: Åsarp-Trädet Fotbollsklubb
- Ground: Åsarps IP; Åsarp; Sweden
- League: Division 4 Västergötland norra

Åsarp-Trädet FK is a Swedish football club located in Åsarp.

== Background ==
Åsarp-Trädet FK currently plays in Division 4 Västergötland norra which is the sixth tier of Swedish football. They play their home matches at Åsarps IP in Åsarp.

The club is affiliated to Västergötlands Fotbollförbund.
