= Ullareds IK =

Swedish football club

- Full name: Ullareds Idrottsklubb
- Nickname(s): Inlandets stolthet
- Founded: 1929; 96 years ago
- Ground: Hedevi IP; Ullared, Sweden
- Chairman: Majwie F Andersson
- Head coach: Uno Andersson
- League: Division 2 Västra Götaland
- 2019: Division 2 Västra Götaland, 10th
Home colours	Away colours

Ullareds IK is a Swedish football club located in Ullared.

== Background ==
Ullareds IK currently plays in Division 2 VÄSTRA GÖTALAND which is the fourth tier of Swedish football. They play their home matches at the Hedevi in Ullared.

The club is affiliated to Hallands Fotbollförbund.

== Season to season ==
Season	Level	Division	Section	Position	Movements
2006*	Tier 7	Division 5	Halland Norra	5th	
2007	Tier 7	Division 5	Halland Norra	4th	Promoted
2008	Tier 6b	Division 4	Halland	2nd	Promoted
2009	Tier 6a	Division 4	Halland Elit	7th	
2010	Tier 6a	Division 4	Halland Elit	4th	
2011	Tier 6a	Division 4	Halland Elit	6th	

* League restructuring in 2006 resulted in a new division being created at Tier 3 and subsequent divisions dropping a level.
