= Råslätts SK =

Swedish football club

- Full name: Råslätts Sportklubb
- Short name: RSK
- Founded: 31 January 1970; 55 years ago
- Ground: Råslätts IP; Jönköping; Sweden
- Capacity: 3.000
- Chairman: Nami Younan
- Coach: Vladan Ladan
- League: Division 3 Mellersta Götaland
- 2019: Division 2 Östra Götaland, 13th (Relegated)
Home colours	Away colours

Råslätts SK is a Swedish football club located in Jönköping.

== Background ==
Råslätts Sportklubb is a sports club from the residential area of Råslätt in south Jönköping. The club was founded on 31 January 1970 and specialises in football, although in their years they also had an ice hockey section. For one season in 1990, the club enlisted Predrag Radosavljevic previously with Red Star Belgrade in the former Yugoslavia. Preki made a huge impact on the team, but left the club after the end of the season and later played for, among others, Everton FC, Portsmouth FC and U.S. national team in the World Cup 1998 in France. In the early 1990s the club was known as FC Jönköping but in 1994 the club reverted to the name Råslätts SK.

Since their foundation, Råslätts SK has participated mainly in the middle and lower divisions of the Swedish football league system. The club currently plays in Division 2 Östra Götaland, which is the fourth tier of Swedish football. They play their home matches at the Råslätts IP in Jönköping.

Råslätts SK are affiliated to Smålands Fotbollförbund.

== Recent history ==
In recent seasons Råslätts SK have competed in the following divisions:

2018 – Division II, Östra Götaland
2017 – Division III, Mellersta Götaland
2016 – Division IV, Småland Elit Västra
2015 – Division III, Sydvästra Götaland
2014 – Division II, Västra Götaland
2013 – Division II, Västra Götaland
2012 – Division III, Sydvästra Götaland
2011 – Division III, Nordöstra Götaland
2010 – Division IV, Småland Elit Västra
2009 – Division III, Nordöstra Götaland
2008 – Division III, Nordöstra Götaland
2007 – Division IV, Småland Västra Elit
2007 – Division IV, Småland Elit Norra
2006 – Division IV, Småland Nordvästra
2005 – Division IV, Småland Nordvästra
2004 – Division IV, Småland Nordvästra
2003 – Division IV, Småland Nordvästra
2002 – Division IV, Småland Nordvästra
2001 – Division V, Småland Nordvästra
2000 – Division V, Småland Nordvästra
1999 – Division V, Småland Nordvästra

== Attendances ==
In recent seasons Råslätts SK have had the following average attendances:

Season	Average Attendance	Division / Section	Level
2007	Not available	Div 4 Småland Elit Västra	Tier 6
2008	50	Div 3 Nordöstra Götaland	Tier 5
2009	156	Div 3 Nordöstra Götaland	Tier 5
2010	86	Div 4 Småland Elit Västra	Tier 6
2011	203	Div 3 Nordöstra Götaland	Tier 5
2012	241	Div 3 Sydvästra Götaland	Tier 5
2013	200	Div 2 Västra Götaland	Tier 4
2014	88	Div 2 Västra Götaland	Tier 4
2015	90	Div 3 Sydvästra Götaland	Tier 5
2016	82	Div 4 Småland Elit Västra	Tier 6
2017	181	Div 3 Mellersta Götaland	Tier 5
2018	209	Div 2 Östra Götaland	Tier 4

* Attendances are provided in the Publikliga sections of the Svenska Fotbollförbundet website.
