= Jesper Björkman =

Swedish footballer

Personal information
- Full name: Jesper Björkman
- Date of birth: 29 April 1993 (age 33)
- Place of birth: Sweden
- Height: 1.85 m (6 ft 1 in)
- Position: Centre-back

Youth career
- Hittarps IK
- Helsingborgs IF

Senior career*
| Years | Team | Apps | (Gls) |
| 2012–2016 | Helsingborgs IF | 24 | (1) |
| 2013 | → Ängelholms FF (loan) | 28 | (1) |
| 2017–2018 | Gefle IF | 41 | (0) |
| 2019–2020 | AFC Eskilstuna | 32 | (0) |
| 2021 | Akropolis IF | 14 | (0) |
| 2022 | Ängelholms FF | 14 | (0) |
- * Club domestic league appearances and goals as of 12:21, 14 November 2021 (UTC)

Jesper Björkman (born 29 April 1993) is a Swedish former footballer who played five seasons in Sweden's top league Allsvenskan for Helsingborgs IF and AFC Eskilstuna as a centre-back.

== Career ==
=== Gefle IF ===
Björkman left Gefle IF at the end of 2018.

== Personal life ==
In December 2022, Björkman was diagnosed with amyotrophic lateral sclerosis (ALS).
