= Åsarp =

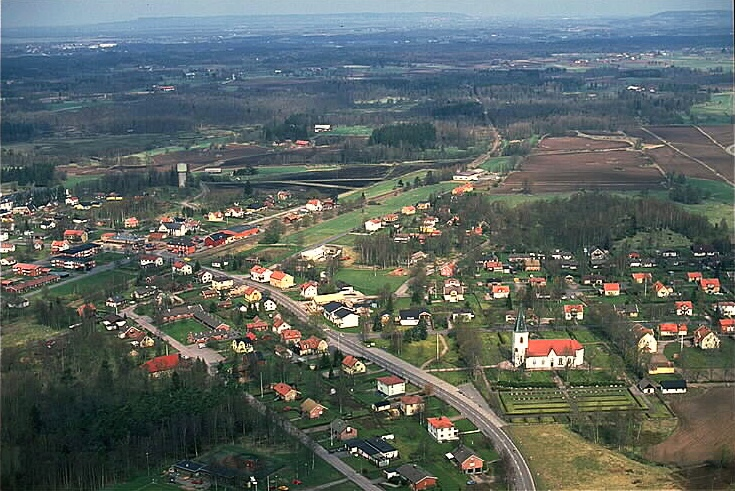
- Åsarp in April 1990

- Location within Västra Götaland Location within Sweden
- Coordinates: 58°02′N 13°34′E
- Country: Sweden
- Province: Västergötland
- County: Västra Götaland County
- Municipality: Falköping Municipality

Area
  - Total: 0.88 km^{2} (0.34 sq mi)

Population (31 December 2010)
  - Total: 598
  - Density: 678/km^{2} (1,760/sq mi)
- Time zone: UTC+1 (CET)
  - Summer (DST): UTC+2 (CEST)
- Climate: Dfb

Åsarp is a locality situated in Falköping Municipality, Västra Götaland County, Sweden. It had 598 inhabitants in 2010.
