= Bunkeflo FF =

Swedish football club

- Full name: Bunkeflo Fotbollförening
- Nickname: Las Avispas
- Short name: BFF
- Founded: 1999
- Ground: Brovallen; Bunkeflostrand; Scania Sweden
- Capacity: 2000 (average attendance 41)
- Chairman: Peter Anderberg
- Coach: Daniel Ahlbeck
- League: Division 4 Skåne Sydvästra A (club record: Division 4)
- 2024: 6th place

Bunkeflo FF is a Swedish football club located in Bunkeflostrand.

== Background ==
Bunkeflo FF plays in Division 4 Skåne Sydvästra A which is the sixth tier of Swedish football. They play their home matches at Brovallen in Bunkeflostrand.

In 2015 the average attendance was 41 persons. The team won the qualification against Stehag and were promoted to division 5.

In 2024 the club reached a historic 6th place in Division 4.

Famous players: Robin Olsen (Malmö FF, PAOK FC, Copenhagen FC, AS Roma)

The club is affiliated to Skånes Fotbollförbund.
