= Rynninge IK =

Swedish football club

- Full name: Rynninge Idrottsklubb
- Founded: 1932
- Ground: Grenadjärvallen; Örebro; Sweden
- Capacity: 1,500
- Chairman: Anders Schreiber
- Head coach: Stellan Carlsson
- League: Division 2 Södra Svealand
- 2019: Division 1 Norra, 15th ▼
| Home colours | Away colours |

Rynninge IK is a Swedish football club located in Rynninge in north-eastern Örebro.

== Background ==
Rynninge Idrottsklubb were founded in 1932 and have concentrated on the sports of football and handball. The club now only participates in football but in the 1940s the club's handball team reached the quarterfinals of the Swedish Handball Championship.

Since their foundation Rynninge IK has participated mainly in the middle divisions of the Swedish football league system and has hovered mostly between Divisions 3 and 4 although in recent years this has been replaced by Divisions 2 and 3. The club currently plays in Division 2 Norra Götaland which is the fourth tier of Swedish football. They play their home matches at the Grenadjärvallen in Örebro. This venue has been the club's home ground since 1944.

Rynninge IK are affiliated to the Örebro Läns Fotbollförbund.

In 2013 the team managed to get into the final stage of Svenska Cupen. They played their home games for that competition at Behrn Arena.

== Season to season ==
| Season | Level | Division | Section | Position | Movements |
|---|---|---|---|---|---|
| 1993 | Tier 4 | Division 3 | Västra Svealand | 5th | |
| 1994 | Tier 4 | Division 3 | Västra Svealand | 4th | |
| 1995 | Tier 4 | Division 3 | Västra Svealand | 1st | Promoted |
| 1996 | Tier 3 | Division 2 | Västra Svealand | 11th | Relegated |
| 1997 | Tier 4 | Division 3 | Västra Svealand | 1st | Promoted |
| 1998 | Tier 3 | Division 2 | Västra Svealand | 9th | |
| 1999 | Tier 3 | Division 2 | Västra Svealand | 3rd | |
| 2000 | Tier 3 | Division 2 | Västra Svealand | 5th | |
| 2001 | Tier 3 | Division 2 | Västra Svealand | 3rd | |
| 2002 | Tier 3 | Division 2 | Västra Svealand | 2nd | |
| 2003 | Tier 3 | Division 2 | Västra Svealand | 3rd | |
| 2004 | Tier 3 | Division 2 | Västra Svealand | 11th | Relegated |
| 2005 | Tier 4 | Division 3 | Västra Svealand | 1st | Promoted |
| 2006* | Tier 4 | Division 2 | Östra Svealand | 4th | |
| 2007 | Tier 4 | Division 2 | Östra Svealand | 3rd | |
| 2008 | Tier 4 | Division 2 | Södra Svealand | 11th | Relegated |
| 2009 | Tier 5 | Division 3 | Västra Svealand | 4th | |
| 2010 | Tier 5 | Division 3 | Västra Svealand | 1st | Promoted |
| 2011 | Tier 4 | Division 2 | Norra Götaland | 3rd | |
| 2012 | Tier 4 | Division 2 | Södra Svealand | 3rd | |
| 2013 | Tier 4 | Division 2 | Norra Götaland | 4th | |
| 2014 | Tier 4 | Division 2 | Södra Svealand | 7th | |
| 2015 | Tier 4 | Division 2 | Norra Götaland | 10th | |
| 2016 | Tier 4 | Division 2 | Norra Götaland | 11th | |
| 2017 | Tier 4 | Division 2 | Södra Svealand | 2nd | Promotion Playoffs - Promoted |
| 2018 | Tier 3 | Division 2 | Norra | 11th | |
| 2019 | Tier 3 | Division 2 | Norra | 15th | |
| 2020 | Tier 4 | Division 2 | | | |

* League restructuring in 2006 resulted in a new division being created at Tier 3 and subsequent divisions dropping a level.

== Attendances ==
In recent seasons Rynninge IK have had the following average attendances:

| Season | Average Attendance | Division / Section | Level |
|---|---|---|---|
| 2005 | 175 | Div 3 Västra Svealand | Tier 4 |
| 2006 | 187 | Div 2 Östra Svealand | Tier 4 |
| 2007 | 152 | Div 2 Östra Svealand | Tier 4 |
| 2008 | 197 | Div 2 Södra Svealand | Tier 4 |
| 2009 | 179 | Div 3 Västra Svealand | Tier 5 |
| 2010 | 158 | Div 3 Västra Svealand | Tier 5 |
| 2011 | 145 | Div 2 Norra Gotaland | Tier 4 |
| 2012 | 155 | Div 2 Södra Svealand | Tier 4 |
| 2013 | 170 | Div 2 Norra Gotaland | Tier 4 |
| 2014 | 159 | Div 2 Södra Svealand | Tier 4 |
| 2015 | 137 | Div 2 Norra Gotaland | Tier 4 |
| 2016 | 173 | Div 2 Norra Gotaland | Tier 4 |
| 2017 | 195 | Div 2 Södra Svealand | Tier 4 |
| 2018 | | Div 1 Norra | Tier 3 |

* Attendances are provided in the Publikliga sections of the Svenska Fotbollförbundet website.

== Current squad ==
As of 31 March 2018

Note: Flags indicate national team as defined under FIFA eligibility rules; some limited exceptions apply. Players may hold more than one non-FIFA nationality.

| No. | Pos. | Nation | Player |
|---|---|---|---|
| 1 | GK | SWE | Rasmus Brolin |
| 4 | DF | SWE | Mattias Florén |
| 5 | DF | SWE | David Hasler |
| 6 | DF | SWE | Johannes Gustafsson |
| 7 | MF | SWE | Rasmus Norén |
| 8 | MF | SWE | Konrad Gustafsson |
| 9 | FW | SWE | Haris Karahmet |
| 10 | FW | SWE | Martin Springfeldt |
| 11 | MF | SWE | Kristoffer Näfver |
| 12 | MF | SWE | Alexander Florén |
| 13 | FW | SWE | Jonathan Lundberg |

| No. | Pos. | Nation | Player |
|---|---|---|---|
| 14 | MF | SWE | Robin Ingvarsson |
| 15 | MF | SWE | Alexander Hallin |
| 16 | MF | SWE | Linus Jansson |
| 17 | MF | SWE | Henrik Hultberg |
| 18 | MF | SWE | Emil Berger |
| 19 | MF | SWE | Pontus Hatula |
| 20 | GK | SWE | Daniel Angergård |
| 22 | GK | SWE | Andreas Carlström |
| 23 | MF | SWE | August Holmberg |
| 56 | MF | SWE | Miran Abdulrahman |
| 92 | DF | SWE | Jens Arrby (captain) |
