= Michael Lerjéus =

Swedish football referee (born 1973)

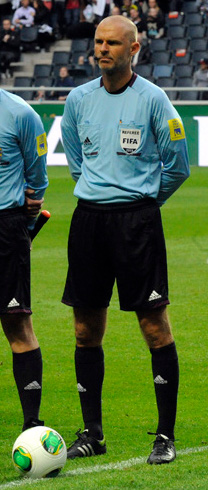
- Full name: Jan Michael Lerjéus
- Born: 1973 (age 52–53); Sweden
- Other occupation: Full-time referee Military Officer

Domestic
Years	League	Role
2002–2015	Superettan	Referee
2006–2015	Allsvenskan	Referee

International
Years	League	Role
2009–2015	FIFA listed	Referee

Michael Lerjéus (born 1973) is a Swedish football referee. Lerjéus currently resides in Skövde. He was a full international referee for FIFA between 2009 and 2015.

He became a professional referee in 1996 and was an Allsvenskan referee from 2006 up until his retirement. Lerjéus had refereed 156 matches in Allsvenskan, 114 matches in Superettan and 31 international matches as of 2014.

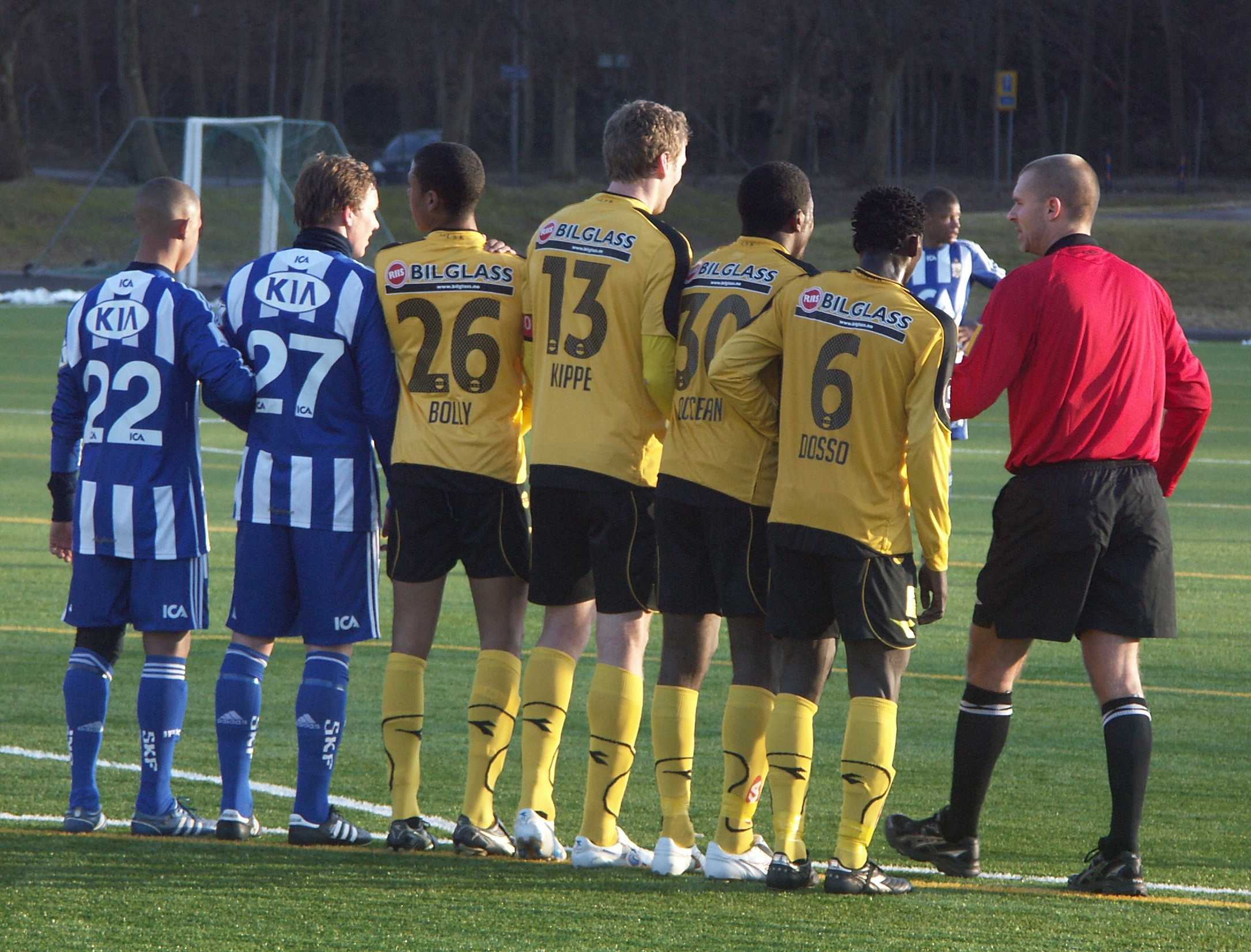
Lerjéus in action during an IFK Göteborg preseason game in 2009.

== See also ==
- List of football referees
