= 2023 Malmö FF season =

Malmö FF
2023 season
- Chairman: Anders Pålsson
- Head coach: Henrik Rydström
- Stadium: Eleda Stadion
- Allsvenskan: 1st
- 2022–23 Svenska Cupen: Quarter-final
- 2023–24 Svenska Cupen: Winners
- Top goalscorer: League: Isaac Kiese Thelin (16); All: Isaac Kiese Thelin (18)
- Highest home attendance: 21,612 (1 April vs Kalmar FF, Allsvenskan)
- Average home league attendance: 20,075

The 2023 season is Malmö FF's 112th in existence, their 88th season in Allsvenskan and their 23rd consecutive season in the league. They are competing in Allsvenskan, the 2022–23 Svenska Cupen and the 2023–24 Svenska Cupen.

== Players ==
=== Squad ===
Note: Flags indicate national team as defined under FIFA eligibility rules; some limited exceptions apply. Players may hold more than one non-FIFA nationality.

No.	Pos.	Nation	Player
1	GK	SWE	Melker Ellborg
2	DF	SWE	Anton Tinnerholm
3	DF	DEN	Jonas Knudsen
4	DF	FIN	Niklas Moisander
5	MF	DEN	Søren Rieks
6	MF	SWE	Oscar Lewicki
7	MF	FRA	Mahamé Siby
8	MF	PER	Sergio Peña
9	FW	SWE	Isaac Kiese Thelin
10	MF	DEN	Anders Christiansen (captain)
11	MF	SWE	Sebastian Nanasi
13	DF	SWE	Martin Olsson
14	MF	DEN	Sebastian Jørgensen
15	DF	SWE	Joseph Ceesay
17	MF	SWE	Otto Rosengren
18	DF	SWE	Pontus Jansson
19	DF	CAN	Derek Cornelius

No.	Pos.	Nation	Player
20	MF	NOR	Oliver Berg
20	MF	SWE	Moustafa Zeidan
21	FW	SWE	Stefano Vecchia
22	MF	SWE	Taha Ali
23	MF	NOR	Lasse Berg Johnsen
24	DF	DEN	Lasse Nielsen
25	DF	BRA	Gabriel Busanello
27	GK	SWE	Johan Dahlin
30	GK	MLI	Ismael Diawara
31	MF	SWE	Hugo Larsson
32	FW	ISL	Daníel Guðjohnsen
33	DF	SWE	Elison Makolli
35	DF	CMR	Samuel Kotto
36	MF	KOS	Patriot Sejdiu
37	MF	SWE	Adrian Skogmar
38	MF	SWE	Hugo Bolin
40	MF	GHA	Emmanuel Lomotey

=== Players in/out ===
==== In ====
No.	Pos.	Nat.	Name	Age	Moving from	Type	Transfer window	Ends	Transfer fee	Source
2	DF	(Sweden)	Anton Tinnerholm	31	New York City (United States)	Transfer	Winter	2026	Free	mff.se
19	DF	(Canada)	Derek Cornelius	25	Vancouver Whitecaps (Canada)	Transfer	Winter	2026	(€455,000)	mff.se
22	MF	(Sweden)	Taha Ali	24	Helsingborg	Transfer	Winter	2026	(€720,000)	mff.se
25	DF	(Brazil)	Gabriel Busanello	24	Chapecoense (Brazil)	Transfer	Winter	2026	(€700,000)	mff.se
21	MF	(Sweden)	Stefano Vecchia	28	Rosenborg (Norway)	Transfer	Winter	2026	Undisclosed	mff.se
18	DF	(Sweden)	Pontus Jansson	32	Brentford (England)	Transfer	Summer	2027	Free	mff.se
17	MF	(Sweden)	Otto Rosengren	20	Mjällby	Transfer	Summer	2027	(€1,300,000)	mff.se
14	MF	(Denmark)	Sebastian Jørgensen	23	Silkeborg (Denmark)	Transfer	Summer	2027	(€1,100,000)	mff.se
23	MF	(Norway)	Lasse Berg Johnsen	23	Randers (Denmark)	Transfer	Summer	2027	(€1,300,000)	mff.se
20	MF	(Norway)	Oliver Berg	29	Djurgården	Transfer	Summer	2026	(€840,000)	mff.se

==== Out ====
No.	Pos.	Nat.	Name	Age	Moving to	Type	Transfer window	Transfer fee	Source
11	FW	(Sweden)	Ola Toivonen	36	Retired	End of contract	Winter		mff.se
18	FW	(United States)	Romain Gall	27	Mladost Novi Sad (Serbia)	End of contract	Winter	Free	mff.se
7	MF	(North Macedonia)	Erdal Rakip	26	Antalyaspor (Turkey)	End of contract	Winter	Free	mff.se
35	MF	(Sweden)	Samuel Adrian	24	Jönköpings Södra	Transfer	Winter	Undisclosed	mff.se
	GK	(Sweden)	Viktor Andersson	18	Lunds BK	Loan	Winter		mff.se
	DF	(Sweden)	Raymond Adjei	18	Olympic	Loan	Winter		mff.se
	DF	(Sweden)	Josef Al-Imam	18	Olympic	Loan	Winter		mff.se
	DF	(Sweden)	André Alvarez Perez	17	Olympic	Loan	Winter		mff.se
	FW	(Sweden)	Samuel Burakovsky	20	Olympic	Loan	Winter		mff.se
	MF	(Senegal)	Mamadou Diagne	19	Olympic	Loan	Winter		mff.se
	MF	(Sweden)	Philip Malky	18	Olympic	Loan	Winter		mff.se
28	MF	(Sweden)	David Edvardsson	20	Landskrona BoIS	Loan	Winter		mff.se
16	GK	(Sweden)	Mathias Nilsson	23	Örgryte	Loan	Winter		mff.se
26	MF	(Sweden)	Mubaarak Nuh	20	Örgryte	Loan	Winter		mff.se
	MF	(Sweden)	Amel Mujanic	21	Örgryte	Transfer	Winter	Undisclosed	mff.se
32	FW	(Norway)	Jo Inge Berget	32	Sarpsborg 08 (Norway)	End of contract	Winter		mff.se
22	FW	(Bosnia and Herzegovina)	Adi Nalić	25	Hammarby	End of contract	Winter	Free	mff.se
	MF	(Sweden)	Melker Widell	20	Landskrona BoIS	Transfer	Winter	Undisclosed	mff.se
23	DF	(Czech Republic)	Matěj Chaluš	24	Groningen (Netherlands)	Loan	Winter		mff.se
14	DF	(Sweden)	Felix Beijmo	24	AGF (Denmark)	Loan	Winter		mff.se
17	FW	(Ghana)	Malik Abubakari	22	Slovan Bratislava (Slovakia)	Loan	Winter		mff.se
	DF	(Mali)	Ismaël Sidibé	21	F91 Dudelange (Luxembourg)	Transfer	Winter	Undisclosed	mff.se
	MF	(Sweden)	August Karlin	19	Jönköpings Södra	Loan	Winter		mff.se
21	MF	(Sweden)	Peter Gwargis	22	Degerfors	Loan	Winter		mff.se
29	DF	(Sweden)	Noah Eile	20	Mjällby	Loan	Winter		mff.se
33	FW	(Sierra Leone)	Mohamed Buya Turay	28	Odense (Denmark)	Released	Winter		mff.se
34	MF	(Sweden)	Markus Björkqvist	19	Trelleborgs FF	Transfer	Winter	Undisclosed	mff.se
31	MF	(Sweden)	Hugo Larsson	19	Eintracht Frankfurt (Germany)	Transfer	Summer	(€11,500,000)	mff.se
14	DF	(Sweden)	Felix Beijmo	25	AGF (Denmark)	Transfer	Summer	(€250,000)	mff.se
23	DF	(Czech Republic)	Matěj Chaluš	25	Slovan Liberec (Czech Republic)	Loan	Summer		mff.se
	FW	(Sweden)	Samuel Burakovsky	20	Landskrona BoIS	Transfer	Summer	Undisclosed	mff.se
40	MF	(Ghana)	Emmanuel Lomotey	25	Ethnikos Achna (Cyprus)	Loan	Summer		mff.se
1	GK	(Sweden)	Melker Ellborg	20	Ariana	Loan	Summer		mff.se
35	DF	(Cameroon)	Samuel Kotto	19	Landskrona BoIS	Loan	Summer		mff.se
20	MF	(Sweden)	Moustafa Zeidan	25	Hatta Club (United Arab Emirates)	Loan	Summer		mff.se
36	MF	(Kosovo)	Patriot Sejdiu	23	NAC Breda (Netherlands)	Loan	Summer		mff.se
24	DF	(Denmark)	Lasse Nielsen	35	Göztepe (Turkey)	Transfer	Summer	Undisclosed	mff.se
38	MF	(Sweden)	Hugo Bolin	20	Degerfors	Loan	Summer		mff.se

== Player statistics ==
=== Appearances and goals ===
As of 12 November 2023

Number	Position	Name	2023 Allsvenskan		2022–23 Svenska Cupen 2023–24 Svenska Cupen		Total	
Number	Position	Name	Appearances	Goals	Appearances	Goals	Appearances	Goals
1	GK	Melker Ellborg	0	0	0	0	0	0
2	DF	Anton Tinnerholm	4	0	4	0	8	0
3	DF	Jonas Knudsen	0	0	0	0	0	0
4	DF	Niklas Moisander	10	0	1	0	11	0
5	MF	Søren Rieks	28	3	2	1	30	4
6	MF	Oscar Lewicki	23	0	2	0	25	0
7	MF	Mahamé Siby	1	0	1	0	2	0
8	MF	Sergio Peña	29	1	3	0	32	1
9	FW	Isaac Kiese Thelin	28	16	4	2	32	18
10	MF	Anders Christiansen	8	1	3	2	11	3
11	MF	Sebastian Nanasi	29	11	4	2	33	13
13	DF	Martin Olsson	20	1	4	0	24	1
14	MF	Sebastian Jørgensen	16	1	1	0	17	1
15	DF	Joseph Ceesay	19	0	4	0	23	0
17	MF	Otto Rosengren	12	2	0	0	12	2
18	DF	Pontus Jansson	15	1	0	0	15	1
19	DF	Derek Cornelius	25	3	5	1	30	4
20	MF	Oliver Berg	6	2	1	0	7	2
20	MF	Moustafa Zeidan	8	0	3	0	11	0
21	MF	Stefano Vecchia	23	8	0	0	23	8
22	MF	Taha Ali	30	6	4	1	34	7
23	MF	Lasse Berg Johnsen	13	0	0	0	13	0
24	DF	Lasse Nielsen	17	0	4	0	21	0
25	DF	Gabriel Busanello	26	1	4	0	30	1
27	GK	Johan Dahlin	29	0	2	0	31	0
30	GK	Ismael Diawara	1	0	4	0	5	0
31	MF	Hugo Larsson	12	2	3	0	15	2
32	FW	Daníel Guðjohnsen	1	0	0	0	1	0
33	DF	Elison Makolli	1	0	1	0	2	0
35	DF	Samuel Kotto	1	0	0	0	1	0
36	MF	Patriot Sejdiu	10	1	3	0	13	1
37	MF	Adrian Skogmar	5	0	1	0	6	0
38	MF	Hugo Bolin	7	0	4	0	11	0
40	MF	Emmanuel Lomotey	0	0	1	0	1	0
42	MF	Adrian Zendelovski	0	0	1	0	1	0
43	DF	Banabas Tagoe	0	0	1	0	1	0

== Competitions ==
=== Allsvenskan ===
==== League table ====
Pos	Team	Pld	W	D	L	GF	GA	GD	Pts	Qualification or relegation
1	Malmö FF (C)	30	20	4	6	62	27	+35	64	Qualification for the Champions League second qualifying round
2	IF Elfsborg	30	20	4	6	59	26	+33	64	Qualification for the Europa League first qualifying round (Note: The 2023–24 Svenska Cupen winners qualified for the Europa League first qualifying round. Since the cup winners (Malmö FF) qualified based on league position, the Europa League spot was passed to the second-placed team, and the second Conference League second qualifying round spot was passed to the fourth-placed team.)
3	BK Häcken	30	18	3	9	69	39	+30	57	Qualification for the Conference League second qualifying round
4	Djurgårdens IF	30	15	5	10	41	36	+5	50	Qualification for the Conference League second qualifying round
5	IFK Värnamo	30	14	3	13	37	34	+3	45	

Source: svenskfotboll.se (in Swedish)
Rules for classification: 1) Points; 2) Goal difference; 3) Goals scored; 4) Head-to-head points; 5) Head-to-head goal difference; 6) Play-off
(Note: Play-off is only played if need to decide champion, teams for relegation or UEFA competition and will be played on a neutral ground).
(C) Champions

==== Results summary ====
Overall								Home						Away					
Pld	W	D	L	GF	GA	GD	Pts	W	D	L	GF	GA	GD	W	D	L	GF	GA	GD
30	20	4	6	62	27	+35	64	11	3	1	38	11	+27	9	1	5	24	16	+8

Last updated: 12 November 2023.
Source: svenskfotboll.se (in Swedish)

==== Results by round ====
Round	1	2	3	4	5	6	7	8	9	10	11	12	13	14	15	16	17	18	19	20	21	22	23	24	25	26	27	28	29	30
Ground	H	A	A	H	H	A	H	A	H	A	H	A	H	H	A	A	H	H	A	H	A	H	A	A	H	A	H	A	A	H
Result	W	W	W	W	W	W	W	W	D	L	W	W	W	L	L	D	W	W	L	D	W	D	W	W	W	L	W	W	L	W
Position	5	2	1	1	1	1	1	1	1	2	1	1	1	2	3	3	3	2	3	3	2	2	1	1	1	2	2	2	2	1

Source: see below
A = Away; H = Home; W = Win; D = Draw; L = Loss

==== Matches ====
1 April 2023 Matchday 1	Malmö FF	1–0	Kalmar FF	Malmö
15:00	Kiese Thelin 67' (pen.)	Report		Stadium: Eleda Stadion; Attendance: 21,612; Referee: Mohammed Al-Hakim

8 April 2023 Matchday 2	IF Brommapojkarna	1–2	Malmö FF	Stockholm
15:00	Jensen 17'	Report	Kiese Thelin 80', 90+2'	Stadium: Grimsta IP; Attendance: 2,788; Referee: Victor Wolf

17 April 2023 Matchday 3	IFK Göteborg	0–1	Malmö FF	Gothenburg
19:10		Report	Kiese Thelin 20'	Stadium: Gamla Ullevi; Attendance: 17,051; Referee: Fredrik Klitte

24 April 2023 Matchday 4	Malmö FF	3–0	IFK Norrköping	Malmö
19:10	Kiese Thelin 14'; Vecchia 72'; Ali 78'	Report		Stadium: Eleda Stadion; Attendance: 17,832; Referee: Adam Ladebäck

30 April 2023 Matchday 5	Malmö FF	4–2	Hammarby IF	Malmö
15:00	Vecchia 15'; Kiese Thelin 36', 43', 59'	Report	Đukanović 58'; Nalić 73'	Stadium: Eleda Stadion; Attendance: 21,102; Referee: Mohammed Al-Hakim

4 May 2023 Matchday 6	Varbergs BoIS	0–6	Malmö FF	Varberg
19:00		Report	Larsson 3'; Rieks 5'; Nanasi 11', 49', 83' (pen.); Ali 59'	Stadium: Påskbergsvallen; Attendance: 3,753; Referee: Victor Wolf

7 May 2023 Matchday 7	Malmö FF	3–1	AIK	Malmö
15:00	Vecchia 10'; Nanasi 15'; Christiansen 40'	Report	Faraj 8' (pen.)	Stadium: Eleda Stadion; Attendance: 19,887; Referee: Glenn Nyberg

14 May 2023 Matchday 8	Halmstads BK	0–1	Malmö FF	Halmstad
17:30		Report	Sejdiu 90+6'	Stadium: Örjans Vall; Attendance: 10,240; Referee: Andreas Ekberg

21 May 2023 Matchday 9	Malmö FF	2–2	BK Häcken	Malmö
15:00	Vecchia 53'; 86' (o.g.)	Report	Hovland 50'; Traoré 76'	Stadium: Eleda Stadion; Attendance: 20,774; Referee: Kristoffer Karlsson

28 May 2023 Matchday 10	IF Elfsborg	3–0	Malmö FF	Borås
17:30	Guðjohnsen 32'; Lagerbielke 36'; Okkels 54'	Report		Stadium: Borås Arena; Attendance: 13,580; Referee: Joakim Östling

5 June 2023 Matchday 11	Malmö FF	5–0	Degerfors IF	Malmö
19:10	Larsson 17'; Nanasi 45+9', 62'; Vecchia 68'; Busanello 75'	Report		Stadium: Eleda Stadion; Attendance: 20,231; Referee: Adam Ladebäck

10 June 2023 Matchday 12	IFK Värnamo	1–3	Malmö FF	Värnamo
15:00	Engvall 2'	Report	Ali 35', 75'; Nanasi 88'	Stadium: Finnvedsvallen; Attendance: 4,504; Referee: Andreas Ekberg

1 July 2023 Matchday 13	Malmö FF	3–0	IK Sirius	Malmö
17:30	Kiese Thelin 5', 48' (pen.); Nanasi 55'	Report		Stadium: Eleda Stadion; Attendance: 18,682; Referee: Victor Wolf

9 July 2023 Matchday 14	Malmö FF	1–2	Mjällby AIF	Malmö
15:00	Nanasi 90+5'	Report	Löfquist 3'; Fenger 44'	Stadium: Eleda Stadion; Attendance: 19,714; Referee: Richard Sundell

17 July 2023 Matchday 15	Djurgårdens IF	2–0	Malmö FF	Stockholm
19:00	Fallenius 10'; Radetinac 81'	Report		Stadium: Tele2 Arena; Attendance: 26,207; Referee: Mohammed Al-Hakim

23 July 2023 Matchday 16	AIK	0–0	Malmö FF	Solna
15:00		Report		Stadium: Friends Arena; Attendance: 26,736; Referee: Adam Ladebäck

31 July 2023 Matchday 17	Malmö FF	3–1	IFK Värnamo	Malmö
19:00	Kiese Thelin 24', 90+3'; Rieks 73'	Report	Johansson 27'	Stadium: Eleda Stadion; Attendance: 20,013; Referee: Adi Aganovic

7 August 2023 Matchday 18	Malmö FF	3–0	Halmstads BK	Malmö
19:00	Jansson 28'; Jørgensen 47'; Rieks 90'	Report		Stadium: Eleda Stadion; Attendance: 17,116; Referee: Joakim Östling

14 August 2023 Matchday 19	Mjällby AIF	1–0	Malmö FF	Hällevik
19:00	Johansson 33'	Report		Stadium: Strandvallen; Attendance: 5,962; Referee: Mohammed Al-Hakim

20 August 2023 Matchday 20	Malmö FF	0–0	Djurgårdens IF	Malmö
15:00		Report		Stadium: Eleda Stadion; Attendance: 20,772; Referee: Victor Wolf

28 August 2023 Matchday 21	IK Sirius	1–3	Malmö FF	Uppsala
19:10	Abou Ali 45+1'	Report	Cornelius 2'; Berg 28'; Ali 74'	Stadium: Studenternas IP; Attendance: 6,867; Referee: Adam Ladebäck

3 September 2023 Matchday 22	Malmö FF	2–2	IFK Göteborg	Malmö
17:30	Kiese Thelin 49' (pen.); Olsson 90+7'	Report	Muçolli 13', 36'	Stadium: Eleda Stadion; Attendance: 20,907; Referee: Fredrik Klitte

17 September 2023 Matchday 23	Hammarby IF	1–3	Malmö FF	Stockholm
15:00	Đukanović 83'	Report	Berg 19'; Vecchia 40'; Rosengren 74'	Stadium: Tele2 Arena; Attendance: 26,747; Referee: Mohammed Al-Hakim

23 September 2023 Matchday 24	Degerfors IF	1–2	Malmö FF	Degerfors
15:00	Campos 79'	Report	Vecchia 42'; Peña 60'	Stadium: Stora Valla; Attendance: 5,523; Referee: Glenn Nyberg

2 October 2023 Matchday 25	Malmö FF	2–1	IF Brommapojkarna	Malmö
19:10	Nanasi 8'; Cornelius 13'	Report	Pettersson 51'	Stadium: Eleda Stadion; Attendance: 20,082; Referee: Oscar Johnson

8 October 2023 Matchday 26	Kalmar FF	1–0	Malmö FF	Kalmar
15:00	Skrabb 90+5'	Report		Stadium: Guldfågeln Arena; Attendance: 10,521; Referee: Kristoffer Karlsson

22 October 2023 Matchday 27	Malmö FF	5–0	Varbergs BoIS	Malmö
17:30	Nanasi 35'; 61' (o.g.); Rosengren 66'; Ali 76'; Vecchia 90+2'	Report		Stadium: Eleda Stadion; Attendance: 20,840; Referee: Joakim Östling

29 October 2023 Matchday 28	IFK Norrköping	0–1	Malmö FF	Norrköping
15:00		Report	Kiese Thelin 60'	Stadium: PlatinumCars Arena; Attendance: 8,566; Referee: Victor Wolf

5 November 2023 Matchday 29	BK Häcken	4–2	Malmö FF	Gothenburg
15:00	Chilufya 20'; Dahbo 59', 62'; Layouni 85'	Report	Cornelius 26'; Kiese Thelin 81'	Stadium: Bravida Arena; Attendance: 6,069; Referee: Mohammed Al-Hakim

12 November 2023 Matchday 30	Malmö FF	1–0	IF Elfsborg	Malmö
15:00	Kiese Thelin 57' (pen.)	Report		Stadium: Eleda Stadion; Attendance: 21,562; Referee: Glenn Nyberg

=== Svenska Cupen ===
Kickoff times are in UTC+1 unless stated otherwise.

==== 2022–23 ====
The tournament continued from the 2022 season.

===== Group stage =====
Pos	Team	Pld	W	D	L	GF	GA	GD	Pts	Qualification
1	Malmö FF	3	3	0	0	5	1	+4	9	Advance to Knockout Stage
2	Degerfors IF	3	2	0	1	4	2	+2	6	
3	Skövde AIK	3	1	0	2	3	4	−1	3	
4	IFK Luleå	3	0	0	3	1	6	−5	0	

Rules for classification: 1) Points; 2) Goal difference; 3) Goals scored; 4) Head-to-head record; 5) Lowest disciplinary points; 6) Highest ranked team

19 February 2023 Matchday 1	Malmö FF	2–0	Skövde AIK	Malmö
13:00	Kiese Thelin 11'; Nanasi 16'	Report		Stadium: Malmö IP; Attendance: 5,462; Referee: Victor Wolf

27 February 2023 Matchday 2	IFK Luleå	0–1	Malmö FF	Luleå
18:30		Report	Nanasi 82'	Stadium: Arcushallen; Attendance: 1,275; Referee: Tess Olofsson

5 March 2023 Matchday 3	Malmö FF	2–1	Degerfors IF	Malmö
13:00	Kiese Thelin 86'; Cornelius 90'	Report	Vukojević 57'	Stadium: Malmö IP; Attendance: 5,494; Referee: Fredrik Klitte

===== Knockout stage =====
12 March 2023 Quarter-final	Djurgårdens IF	2–2 (a.e.t.) (5–3 p)	Malmö FF	Stockholm
16:00	Andersson 86'; Finndell 120'	Report	Christiansen 10', 114'	Stadium: Tele2 Arena; Attendance: 13,752; Referee: Adam Ladebäck
	Penalties
	Danielson (penalty scored); Berg (penalty scored); Asoro (penalty scored); Löfgren (penalty scored); Šabović (penalty scored)		(penalty missed) Kiese Thelin; (penalty scored) Nielsen; (penalty scored) Christiansen; (penalty scored) Olsson

==== 2023–24 ====
===== Qualification stage =====
23 August 2023 Round 2	Smedby AIS	0–2	Malmö FF	Norrköping
19:00		Report	Rieks 65'; Ali 90+2'	Stadium: PreZero Arena; Attendance: 2,004; Referee: Andreas Dufva-Johansson

== Non-competitive ==
=== Pre-season ===
Kickoff times are in UTC+1 unless stated otherwise.

20 January 2023	Malmö FF	2–0	Randers FC	Malmö
15:00	43' (o.g.); Sejdiu 83'	Report		Stadium: Malmö IP

27 January 2023	Malmö FF	0–1	FC Nordsjælland	Malmö
15:00		Report	Svensson 64'	Stadium: Malmö IP

3 February 2023	Malmö FF	0–0	FC Dallas	Marbella
16:00		Report		Stadium: Marbella Football Center

10 February 2023	Malmö FF	3–0	Vålerenga IF	Marbella
13:00	Christiansen 3', 12', 32'	Report		Stadium: Atalaya Football Camp

10 February 2023	Malmö FF	4–3	AGF	Marbella
16:15	Rieks 15'; Buya Turay 25', 65'; Sejdiu 68'	Report	Haugen 19', 77'; Duin 53'	Stadium: Marbella Football Center

18 March 2023	Malmö FF	2–2	Östers IF	Malmö
14:00	Christiansen 21'; Ali 68'	Report	Westermark 18', 72'	Stadium: Eleda Stadion

=== Mid-season ===
Kickoff times are in UTC+2 unless stated otherwise.

25 June 2023	Malmö FF	0–1	IFK Göteborg	Malmö
16:00		Report	Norlin 26'	Stadium: Eleda Stadion; Attendance: 4,930; Referee: Oscar Johnson
