= 2024 Malmö FF season =

Football season

Malmö FF
2024 season
- Chairman: Anders Pålsson
- Head coach: Henrik Rydström
- Stadium: Eleda Stadion
- Allsvenskan: 1st
- 2023–24 Svenska Cupen: Winners
- 2024–25 Svenska Cupen: Runners-up
- 2024–25 UEFA Champions League: Play off round
- 2024–25 UEFA Europa League: League phase, 31st
- Top goalscorer: League: Isaac Kiese Thelin (15); All: Isaac Kiese Thelin (20)
Home colours	Away colours	Third colours

The 2024 season is Malmö FF's 113th in existence, their 89th season in Allsvenskan and their 24th consecutive season in the league. They are competing in Allsvenskan, the 2023–24 Svenska Cupen, the 2024–25 Svenska Cupen, the 2024–25 UEFA Champions League and the 2024–25 UEFA Europa League.

== Players ==
=== Squad ===
Note: Flags indicate national team as defined under FIFA eligibility rules; some limited exceptions apply. Players may hold more than one non-FIFA nationality.

No.	Pos.	Nation	Player
1	GK	BRA	Ricardo Friedrich
3	DF	SWE	Anton Tinnerholm
4	DF	FIN	Niklas Moisander
5	MF	DEN	Søren Rieks
6	MF	SWE	Oscar Lewicki
7	MF	SWE	Otto Rosengren
8	MF	PER	Sergio Peña
9	FW	SWE	Isaac Kiese Thelin
10	MF	DEN	Anders Christiansen
11	MF	SWE	Sebastian Nanasi
13	DF	SWE	Martin Olsson
14	MF	DEN	Sebastian Jørgensen
16	MF	NOR	Oliver Berg
17	DF	DEN	Jens Stryger Larsen
18	DF	SWE	Pontus Jansson
19	DF	CAN	Derek Cornelius

No.	Pos.	Nation	Player
19	DF	NOR	Colin Rösler
20	FW	NOR	Erik Botheim
21	FW	SWE	Stefano Vecchia
22	MF	SWE	Taha Ali
23	MF	NOR	Lasse Berg Johnsen
25	DF	BRA	Gabriel Busanello
26	MF	SWE	Mubaarak Nuh
27	GK	SWE	Johan Dahlin
29	MF	MNE	Sead Hakšabanović
32	FW	ISL	Daníel Guðjohnsen
33	DF	SWE	Elison Makolli
34	MF	SWE	Zakaria Loukili
35	DF	SWE	Nils Zätterström
37	MF	SWE	Adrian Skogmar
38	MF	SWE	Hugo Bolin

=== Players in/out ===
==== In ====
No.	Pos.	Nat.	Name	Age	Moving from	Type	Transfer window	Ends	Transfer fee	Source
1	GK	(Brazil)	Ricardo Friedrich	30	Kalmar FF	Transfer	Winter	2026	Free	mff.se
17	DF	(Denmark)	Jens Stryger Larsen	32	Trabzonspor (Turkey)	Transfer	Winter	2026	Free	mff.se
20	FW	(Norway)	Erik Botheim	24	Salernitana (Italy)	Transfer	Winter	2027	Undisclosed	mff.se
29	MF	(Montenegro)	Sead Hakšabanović	25	Celtic (Scotland)	Transfer	Summer	2028	(€2,000,000)	mff.se
19	DF	(Norway)	Colin Rösler	24	Mjällby	Transfer	Summer	2027	(€1,000,000)	mff.se

==== Out ====
No.	Pos.	Nat.	Name	Age	Moving to	Type	Transfer window	Transfer fee	Source
3	DF	(Denmark)	Jonas Knudsen	31	Free agent	End of contract	Winter		mff.se
	GK	(Sweden)	Viktor Andersson	19	IFK Värnamo	Transfer	Winter	Undisclosed	mff.se
30	GK	(Mali)	Ismael Diawara	29	AIK	Transfer	Winter	Undisclosed	mff.se
1	GK	(Sweden)	Melker Ellborg	20	Trelleborgs FF	Loan	Winter		mff.se
23	DF	(Czech Republic)	Matěj Chaluš	25	Slovan Liberec (Czech Republic)	Loan	Winter		mff.se
35	DF	(Cameroon)	Samuel Kotto	20	IFK Värnamo	Loan	Winter		mff.se
29	DF	(Sweden)	Noah Eile	21	New York Red Bulls (United States)	Transfer	Winter	(€900,000)	mff.se
7	MF	(France)	Mahamé Siby	27	Bastia (France)	Loan	Winter		mff.se
28	MF	(Sweden)	David Edvardsson	21	Landskrona BoIS	Loan	Winter		mff.se
	FW	(Ghana)	Malik Abubakari	23	Viborg (Denmark)	Loan	Winter		mff.se
	MF	(Sweden)	August Karlin	20	Lillestrøm (Norway)	Transfer	Winter	Undisclosed	mff.se
	DF	(Sweden)	André Alvarez Perez	18	Aab (Denmark)	Loan	Winter		mff.se
	MF	(Senegal)	Mamadou Diagne	20	Skövde AIK	Loan	Winter		mff.se
16	GK	(Sweden)	Mathias Nilsson	24	Gnistan (Finland)	Loan	Winter		mff.se
	GK	(Sweden)	Marcus Pettersson	18	Olympic	Loan	Winter		mff.se
	DF	(Ghana)	Banabas Tagoe	19	Olympic	Loan	Winter		mff.se
	MF	(Sweden)	Peter Gwargis	23	Örebro SK	Loan	Winter		mff.se
15	DF	(The Gambia)	Joseph Ceesay	25	IFK Norrköping	Loan	Winter		mff.se
40	MF	(Ghana)	Emmanuel Lomotey	26	Ethnikos Achna (Cyprus)	Transfer	Summer	Undisclosed	mff.se
23	DF	(Czech Republic)	Matěj Chaluš	26	Baník Ostrava (Czech Republic)	Transfer	Summer	Undisclosed	mff.se
36	MF	(Kosovo)	Patriot Sejdiu	24	Roda (Netherlands)	Loan	Summer		mff.se
7	MF	(France)	Mahamé Siby	28	Martigues (France)	Loan	Summer		mff.se
15	DF	(The Gambia)	Joseph Ceesay	26	Cesena (Italy)	Loan	Summer		mff.se
19	DF	(Canada)	Derek Cornelius	26	Marseille (France)	Transfer	Summer	(€4,300,000)	mff.se
	FW	(Ghana)	Malik Abubakari	24	Lyngby (Denmark)	Transfer	Summer	Undisclosed	mff.se
16	GK	(Sweden)	Mathias Nilsson	25	Gefle	Transfer	Summer		mff.se
	MF	(Palestine)	Moustafa Zeidan	26	Rosenborg (Norway)	Loan	Summer		mff.se
11	MF	(Sweden)	Sebastian Nanasi	22	Strasbourg (France)	Transfer	Summer	(€11,000,000)	mff.se
	MF	(Sweden)	Peter Gwargis	23	Duhok (Iraq)	Transfer	Summer	Undisclosed	mff.se

== Player statistics ==
=== Appearances and goals ===
As of 12 December 2024

Number	Position	Name	2024 Allsvenskan		2023–24 Svenska Cupen 2024–25 Svenska Cupen		2024–25 UEFA Champions League 2024–25 UEFA Europa League		Total	
Number	Position	Name	Appearances	Goals	Appearances	Goals	Appearances	Goals	Appearances	Goals
1	GK	Ricardo Friedrich	10	0	1	0	4	0	15	0
3	DF	Anton Tinnerholm	3	0	0	0	0	0	3	0
4	DF	Niklas Moisander	2	0	1	0	0	0	3	0
5	MF	Søren Rieks	20	3	4	1	8	2	32	6
6	MF	Oscar Lewicki	2	0	1	0	0	0	3	0
7	MF	Otto Rosengren	26	1	6	1	6	0	38	2
8	MF	Sergio Peña	21	1	4	1	12	1	37	3
9	FW	Isaac Kiese Thelin	26	15	6	5	11	0	43	20
10	MF	Anders Christiansen	19	5	1	0	11	2	31	7
11	MF	Sebastian Nanasi	17	6	6	1	4	3	27	10
13	DF	Martin Olsson	15	0	4	0	2	0	21	0
14	MF	Sebastian Jørgensen	15	1	7	3	2	0	24	4
15	DF	Joseph Ceesay	0	0	0	0	0	0	0	0
16	MF	Oliver Berg	17	0	3	0	9	0	29	0
17	DF	Jens Stryger Larsen	24	0	4	1	11	0	39	1
18	DF	Pontus Jansson	26	1	5	1	10	1	41	3
19	DF	Derek Cornelius	12	2	6	0	0	0	18	2
19	DF	Colin Rösler	11	0	1	0	8	0	20	0
20	FW	Erik Botheim	30	12	6	3	12	4	48	19
21	MF	Stefano Vecchia	2	1	3	1	0	0	5	2
22	MF	Taha Ali	28	1	5	3	11	0	44	4
23	MF	Lasse Berg Johnsen	28	2	7	1	12	2	47	5
25	DF	Gabriel Busanello	26	1	5	0	12	0	43	1
26	MF	Mubaarak Nuh	0	0	0	0	0	0	0	0
27	GK	Johan Dahlin	20	0	5	0	8	0	33	0
29	MF	Sead Hakšabanović	3	0	0	0	0	0	3	0
30	GK	Joakim Persson	0	0	1	0	1	0	2	0
32	FW	Daníel Guðjohnsen	1	0	1	3	0	0	2	3
33	DF	Elison Makolli	11	0	3	0	1	0	15	0
34	MF	Zakaria Loukili	6	0	2	0	5	0	13	0
35	DF	Nils Zätterström	14	2	3	0	8	1	25	3
37	MF	Adrian Skogmar	8	0	5	1	1	0	14	1
38	MF	Hugo Bolin	25	10	5	0	12	2	42	12
41	MF	Kenan Busuladzic	1	0	0	0	0	0	1	0

== Competitions ==
=== Allsvenskan ===
==== League table ====
Pos	Team	Pld	W	D	L	GF	GA	GD	Pts	Qualification or relegation
1	Malmö FF (C)	30	19	8	3	67	25	+42	65	Qualification for the Champions League first qualifying round
2	Hammarby IF	30	16	6	8	48	25	+23	54	Qualification for the Conference League second qualifying round
3	AIK	30	17	3	10	46	41	+5	54	Qualification for the Conference League second qualifying round
4	Djurgårdens IF	30	16	5	9	45	35	+10	53	
5	Mjällby AIF	30	14	8	8	44	35	+9	50	

Source: svenskfotboll.se (in Swedish)
Rules for classification: 1) Points; 2) Goal difference; 3) Goals scored; 4) Head-to-head points; 5) Head-to-head goal difference; 6) Head-to-head away goals scored; 7) Play-off
(Note: Play-off is only played if need to decide champion, teams for relegation or UEFA competition and will be played on a neutral ground).
(C) Champions

==== Results summary ====
Overall								Home						Away					
Pld	W	D	L	GF	GA	GD	Pts	W	D	L	GF	GA	GD	W	D	L	GF	GA	GD
30	19	8	3	67	25	+42	65	13	1	1	38	7	+31	6	7	2	29	18	+11

Last updated: 2 November 2024.
Source: svenskfotboll.se (in Swedish)

==== Results by round ====
Round	1	2	3	4	5	6	7	8	9	10	11	12	13	14	15	16	17	18	19	20	21	22	23	24	25	26	27	28	29	30
Ground	A	H	A	H	A	H	A	A	H	A	H	A	H	A	A	H	H	A	H	A	H	A	H	A	H	H	A	H	A	H
Result	W	W	W	W	W	W	L	W	W	D	W	D	W	L	W	L	W	W	W	D	W	D	W	D	W	D	D	W	D	W
Position	1	1	1	1	1	1	1	1	1	1	1	1	1	1	1	1	1	1	1	1	1	1	1	1	1	1	1	1	1	1

Source: see below
A = Away; H = Home; W = Win; D = Draw; L = Loss

==== Matches ====
30 March 2024 Matchday 1	IFK Norrköping	1–5	Malmö FF	Norrköping
15:00	Sigurgeirsson 87'	Report	Kiese Thelin 14'; Botheim 32'; Nanasi 44'; Rieks 57'; Vecchia 76'	Stadium: Nya Parken; Attendance: 13,028; Referee: Mohammed Al-Hakim

7 April 2024 Matchday 2	Malmö FF	2–0	Hammarby IF	Malmö
14:00	Kiese Thelin 34', 48'	Report		Stadium: Stadion; Attendance: 21,357; Referee: Adam Ladebäck

15 April 2024 Matchday 3	IFK Värnamo	0–4	Malmö FF	Borås (Note: The game was moved to Borås, and from Sunday to Monday, following a failed pitch inspection at Finnvedsvallen.)
19:00		Report	Kiese Thelin 6'; Cornelius 33'; Nanasi 51'; Botheim 78'	Stadium: Borås Arena; Attendance: 1,371; Referee: Richard Sundell

20 April 2024 Matchday 4	Malmö FF	1–0	Västerås SK	Malmö
17:30	Nanasi 82'	Report		Stadium: Stadion; Attendance: 20,118; Referee: Oscar Johnson

25 April 2024 Matchday 5	Djurgårdens IF	0–1	Malmö FF	Stockholm
19:00		Report	Botheim 90+4'	Stadium: Tele2 Arena; Attendance: 23,010; Referee: Mohammed Al-Hakim

28 April 2024 Matchday 6	Malmö FF	5–0	AIK	Malmö
14:00	Botheim 15'; Kiese Thelin 32', 71'; 45+1' (o.g.); Nanasi 57'	Report		Stadium: Stadion; Attendance: 21,495; Referee: Joakim Östling

5 May 2024 Matchday 7	IF Elfsborg	3–1	Malmö FF	Borås
14:00	Zeneli 34'; Hedlund 53'; 74' (o.g.)	Report	Jørgensen 80'	Stadium: Borås Arena; Attendance: 11,145; Referee: Kristoffer Karlsson

13 May 2024 Matchday 8	IFK Göteborg	0–3	Malmö FF	Gothenburg
19:10		Report	Botheim 34'; Rieks 42'; Berg Johnsen 88'	Stadium: Gamla Ullevi; Attendance: 17,316; Referee: Mohammed Al-Hakim

16 May 2024 Matchday 9	Malmö FF	1–0	GAIS	Malmö
19:00	Jansson 84'	Report		Stadium: Stadion; Attendance: 20,673; Referee: Oscar Johnson

20 May 2024 Matchday 10	BK Häcken	2–2	Malmö FF	Gothenburg
19:10	Lindberg 76'; Gustafson 90+3' (pen.)	Report	Nanasi 8'; Kiese Thelin 48'	Stadium: Bravida Arena; Attendance: 5,952; Referee: Fredrik Klitte

24 May 2024 Matchday 11	Malmö FF	5–0	Kalmar FF	Malmö
19:00	Bolin 4'; Botheim 7', 31', 40'; Kiese Thelin 55'	Report		Stadium: Stadion; Attendance: 20,546; Referee: Adam Ladebäck

28 May 2024 Matchday 17	Malmö FF	2–1	IF Elfsborg	Malmö
19:00	Bolin 40'; Kiese Thelin 57'	Report	Zeneli 9'	Stadium: Stadion; Attendance: 20,488; Referee: Joakim Östling

1 June 2024 Matchday 12	IF Brommapojkarna	2–2	Malmö FF	Stockholm
15:00	Vasić 24'; Heggem 65'	Report	Kiese Thelin 23'; Cornelius 90+6'	Stadium: Grimsta IP; Referee: Glenn Nyberg

7 July 2024 Matchday 13	Malmö FF	5–1	Halmstads BK	Malmö
16:30	Christiansen 22'; Kiese Thelin 37'; Botheim 74'; Bolin 85', 90+3'	Report	Ingason 29'	Stadium: Stadion; Attendance: 20,081; Referee: Granit Maqedonci

14 July 2024 Matchday 14	Mjällby AIF	2–1	Malmö FF	Hällevik
15:00	Stroud 33'; Bergström 46'	Report	79' (o.g.)	Stadium: Strandvallen; Attendance: 5,919; Referee: Oscar Johnson

21 July 2024 Matchday 15	IK Sirius	3–4	Malmö FF	Uppsala
19:00	Walta 34'; Vikman 45+1'; Persson 78'	Report	Nanasi 60'; Bolin 72'; Kiese Thelin 83'; Zätterström 87'	Stadium: Studenternas IP; Attendance: 7,695; Referee: Adam Ladebäck

27 July 2024 Matchday 16	Malmö FF	0–1	IK Sirius	Malmö
17:30		Report	Walta 51'	Stadium: Stadion; Attendance: 19,178; Referee: Joakim Östling

10 August 2024 Matchday 18	Halmstads BK	0–1	Malmö FF	Halmstad
15:00		Report	Peña 31'	Stadium: Örjans Vall; Attendance: 8,654; Referee: Richard Sundell

17 August 2024 Matchday 19	Malmö FF	2–1	IFK Norrköping	Malmö
15:00	Christiansen 30'; Berg Johnsen 78'	Report	Sigurgeirsson 21'	Stadium: Stadion; Attendance: 19,758; Referee: Adi Aganovic

24 August 2024 Matchday 20	Kalmar FF	2–2	Malmö FF	Kalmar
15:00	Hallberg 53'; Osuji 63'	Report	Botheim 9' (pen.); Bolin 77'	Stadium: Guldfågeln Arena; Attendance: 7,313; Referee: Kristoffer Karlsson

1 September 2024 Matchday 21	Malmö FF	4–0	Djurgårdens IF	Malmö
14:00	Bolin 9'; Christiansen 20'; 22' (o.g.); Kiese Thelin 80'	Report		Stadium: Stadion; Attendance: 20,432; Referee: Fredrik Klitte

15 September 2024 Matchday 22	AIK	0–0	Malmö FF	Stockholm
14:00		Report		Stadium: Strawberry Arena; Attendance: 27,595; Referee: Mohammed Al-Hakim

18 September 2024 Matchday 24	GAIS	0–0	Malmö FF	Gothenburg
19:00		Report		Stadium: Gamla Ullevi; Attendance: 8,470; Referee: Victor Wolf

22 September 2024 Matchday 23	Malmö FF	4–0	BK Häcken	Malmö
16:30	Christiansen 7', 48'; Kiese Thelin 80'; Botheim 83'	Report		Stadium: Stadion; Attendance: 19,856; Referee: Kristoffer Karlsson

29 September 2024 Matchday 25	Malmö FF	2–0	Mjällby AIF	Malmö
16:30	Rieks 20'; Kiese Thelin 31'	Report		Stadium: Stadion; Attendance: 19,673; Referee: Mohammed Al-Hakim

6 October 2024 Matchday 26	Malmö FF	1–1	IFK Värnamo	Malmö
16:30	Bolin 55'	Report	Zeljkovic 89' (pen.)	Stadium: Stadion; Attendance: 19,443; Referee: Adi Aganovic

19 October 2024 Matchday 27	Västerås SK	1–1	Malmö FF	Västerås
15:00	Ribeiro 65'	Report	Botheim 16'	Stadium: Hitachi Energy Arena; Attendance: 7,738; Referee: Granit Maqedonci

28 October 2024 Matchday 28	Malmö FF	2–1	IFK Göteborg	Malmö
19:10	Ali 59'; Bolin 78'	Report	Skjellerup 25'	Stadium: Stadion; Attendance: 21,258; Referee: Glenn Nyberg

2 November 2024 Matchday 29	Hammarby IF	2–2	Malmö FF	Stockholm
15:00	Erabi 15'; Besara 43'	Report	Zätterström 65'; Bolin 67'	Stadium: Tele2 Arena; Attendance: 26,175; Referee: Mohammed Al-Hakim

10 November 2024 Matchday 30	Malmö FF	2–1	IF Brommapojkarna	Malmö
15:00	Rosengren 29'; Busanello 43'	Report	Odefalk 45+2'	Stadium: Stadion; Attendance: 19,745; Referee: Tess Olofsson

=== Svenska Cupen ===
Kickoff times are in UTC+1 unless stated otherwise.

==== 2023–24 ====
The tournament continued from the 2023 season.

===== Group stage =====
Pos	Team	Pld	W	D	L	GF	GA	GD	Pts	Qualification
1	Malmö FF	3	2	1	0	11	1	+10	7	Advance to Knockout stage
2	Östers IF	3	2	0	1	9	3	+6	6	
3	Varbergs BoIS	3	1	1	1	6	5	+1	4	
4	IFK Luleå	3	0	0	3	0	17	−17	0	

Source: SvFF
Rules for classification: 1) Points; 2) Goal difference; 3) Goals scored; 4) Head-to-head record; 5) Lowest disciplinary points; 6) Highest ranked team

17 February 2024 Matchday 1	Malmö FF	2–0	Östers IF	Malmö
13:00	Peña 64'; Stryger Larsen 90+3'	Report		Stadium: Stadion; Attendance: 9,595; Referee: Per Melin

24 February 2024 Matchday 2	IFK Luleå	0–8	Malmö FF	Luleå
13:00		Report	Kiese Thelin 11', 49', 53'; Jørgensen 34'; Rosengren 41'; Nanasi 66'; Skogmar 70'; Vecchia 87'	Stadium: Arcushallen; Attendance: 1,177; Referee: Tess Olofsson

3 March 2024 Matchday 3	Malmö FF	1–1	Varbergs BoIS	Malmö
13:00	Jansson 10'	Report	Abdulazeez 31'	Stadium: Stadion; Attendance: 9,033; Referee: Fredrik Klitte

===== Knockout stage =====
10 March 2024 Quarter-final	Malmö FF	5–2	IFK Norrköping	Malmö
16:00	Jørgensen 15', 77'; Botheim 72'; Ali 83', 90+5'	Report	Björk 2'; Prica 90'	Stadium: Stadion; Attendance: 10,813; Referee: Glenn Nyberg

16 March 2024 Semi-final	Halmstads BK	0–4	Malmö FF	Halmstad
15:00		Report	Botheim 50', 73'; Berg Johnsen 53'; Kiese Thelin 70'	Stadium: Örjans Vall; Attendance: 8,043; Referee: Kristoffer Karlsson

1 May 2024 Final	Malmö FF	1–1 (a.e.t.) (4–1 p)	Djurgårdens IF	Malmö
14:00	Ali 70'	Report	Hümmet 78'	Stadium: Stadion; Attendance: 17,264; Referee: Adam Ladebäck
	Penalties
	Christiansen (penalty scored); Kiese Thelin (penalty scored); Olsson (penalty scored); Berg Johnsen (penalty scored)		(penalty scored) Danielson; (penalty missed) Radetinac; (penalty missed) Gulliksen

==== 2024–25 ====
===== Qualification stage =====
1 December 2024 Round 2	Torslanda IK	2–5 (a.e.t.)	Malmö FF	Malmö
13:00	Davidsson 58'; Bright 90+2'	Report	Kiese Thelin 54' (pen.); Daníel Guðjohnsen 88', 93', 112'; Rieks 118'	Stadium: Malmö IP; Attendance: 2,833; Referee: Jovan Krsmanovic

=== UEFA Champions League ===
Kickoff times are in UTC+2 unless stated otherwise.

==== Qualifying phase ====
===== Second qualifying round =====
23 July 2024 First Leg	Malmö FF	4–1	(Faroe Islands) KÍ	Malmö
19:00	Johnsen 21', 43'; Bolin 37'; Rieks 85'	Report	Frederiksberg 71'	Stadium: Stadion; Attendance: 18,432; Referee: Lukas Fähndrich

30 July 2024 Second Leg	KÍ (Faroe Islands)	3–2 (4–6 agg.)	Malmö FF	Klaksvík
19:45 UTC+1	Berntsson 2'; Frederiksberg 65', 90+5'	Report	Bolin 13'; Christiansen 59' (pen.)	Stadium: Við Djúpumýrar; Attendance: 1,247; Referee: Vitālijs Spasjoņņikovs

===== Third qualifying round =====
6 August 2024 First Leg	Malmö FF	2–2	(Greece) PAOK	Malmö
19:00	Jansson 28'; Nanasi 67'	Report	Taison 42'; Rahman 75'	Stadium: Stadion; Attendance: 18,658; Referee: John Beaton

13 August 2024 Second Leg	PAOK (Greece)	3–4 (a.e.t.) (5–6 agg.)	Malmö FF	Thessaloniki
20:30 UTC+3	Taison 21'; Koulierakis 43'; Živković 45+3'	Report	Nanasi 10', 45'; Zätterström 90+6'; Christiansen 99'	Stadium: Toumba Stadium; Attendance: 17,678; Referee: Marco Di Bello

===== Play-off round =====
21 August 2024 First Leg	Malmö FF	0–2	(Czech Republic) Sparta Prague	Malmö
21:00		Report	31' (o.g.); Ryneš 89'	Stadium: Stadion; Attendance: 20,589; Referee: Jesús Gil Manzano

27 August 2024 Second Leg	Sparta Prague (Czech Republic)	2–0 (4–0 agg.)	Malmö FF	Prague
21:00	Haraslín 80' (pen.); Rrahmani 83'	Report		Stadium: Stadion Letná; Attendance: 18,215; Referee: Clément Turpin

=== UEFA Europa League ===
Kickoff times are in UTC+2 unless stated otherwise.

==== League phase ====
Pos	Team	Pld	W	D	L	GF	GA	GD	Pts
29	(Israel Football Association) Maccabi Tel Aviv	8	2	0	6	8	17	−9	6
30	(Football Association of the Czech Republic) Slavia Prague	8	1	2	5	7	11	−4	5
31	(Swedish Football Association) Malmö FF	8	1	2	5	10	17	−7	5
32	(Latvian Football Federation) RFS	8	1	2	5	6	13	−7	5
33	(Bulgarian Football Union) Ludogorets Razgrad	8	0	4	4	4	11	−7	4

Source: UEFA
Rules for classification: League phase tiebreakers

26 September 2024 Matchday 1	Malmö FF	0–2	(Scotland) Rangers	Malmö
18:45		Report	Bajrami 1'; McCausland 76'	Stadium: Stadion; Attendance: 20,021; Referee: Luis Godinho

3 October 2024 Matchday 2	Qarabağ (Azerbaijan)	1–2	Malmö FF	Baku
18:45 UTC+4	Juninho 15'	Report	Botheim 19', 47'	Stadium: Tofiq Bahramov Republican Stadium; Attendance: 28,234; Referee: Anastasios Papapetrou

24 October 2024 Matchday 3	Malmö FF	0–1	(Greece) Olympiacos	Malmö
21:00		Report	El Kaabi 30'	Stadium: Stadion; Attendance: 19,478; Referee: Simone Sozza

6 November 2024 Matchday 4	Beşiktaş (Turkey)	2–1	Malmö FF	Istanbul
18:30 UTC+3	Muçi 76'; Kılıçsoy 85'	Report	Rieks 90+3'	Stadium: Beşiktaş Stadium; Attendance: 24,652; Referee: Sven Jablonski

28 November 2024 Matchday 5	Ferencváros (Hungary)	4–1	Malmö FF	Budapest
21:00	B. Varga 8' (pen.), 11'; Kady 53'; Cissé 74'	Report	Botheim 18' (pen.)	Stadium: Ferencváros Stadion; Attendance: 18,891; Referee: Aliyar Aghayev

12 December 2024 Matchday 6	Malmö FF	2–2	(Turkey) Galatasaray	Malmö
18:45	Botheim 24'; Peña 90+2'	Report	Jelert 43'; Akgün 56'	Stadium: Stadion; Attendance: 19,489; Referee: John Brooks

The tournament will continue into the 2025 season.

== Non-competitive ==
=== Pre-season ===
Kickoff times are in UTC+1 unless stated otherwise.

25 January 2024	Malmö FF	2–0	Silkeborg IF	Lund
14:00	Vecchia 12'; Abubakari 82'	Report		Stadium: Klostergårdens IP; Referee: Kristoffer Karlsson

1 February 2024	Malmö FF	1–2	Sparta Prague	Marbella
15:30	Nanasi 8'	Report	Krejčí 11', 60'	Stadium: Marbella Football Center

8 February 2024	Malmö FF	4–1	FC Dallas	Marbella
11:00	Diagne 9'; Jørgensen 13'; Kiese Thelin 55', 74'	Report		Stadium: Marbella Football Center

8 February 2024	Malmö FF	0–4	Bodø/Glimt	Marbella
14:00		Report	Hauge 10'; Saltnes 11'; Kapskarmo 79'; Gulliksen 90'	Stadium: Banús Football Center

18 February 2024	Malmö FF	0–2	Falkenbergs FF	Malmö
12:00		Report	Borgström 29'; Lindberg 50'	Stadium: Limhamns IP; Attendance: 250; Referee: Arianit Abazi

=== Mid-season ===
Kickoff times are in UTC+2 unless stated otherwise.

28 June 2024	Lyngby	0–2	Malmö FF	Kongens Lyngby
15:00		Report	Christiansen 56'; Nanasi 82'	Stadium: Lyngby Stadium

5 December 2024	RFS (Latvia)	0–1	Malmö FF	Marbella
18:00		Report	82' (o.g.)	Stadium: Marbella Football Center
