= Hugo Bolin =

Swedish footballer

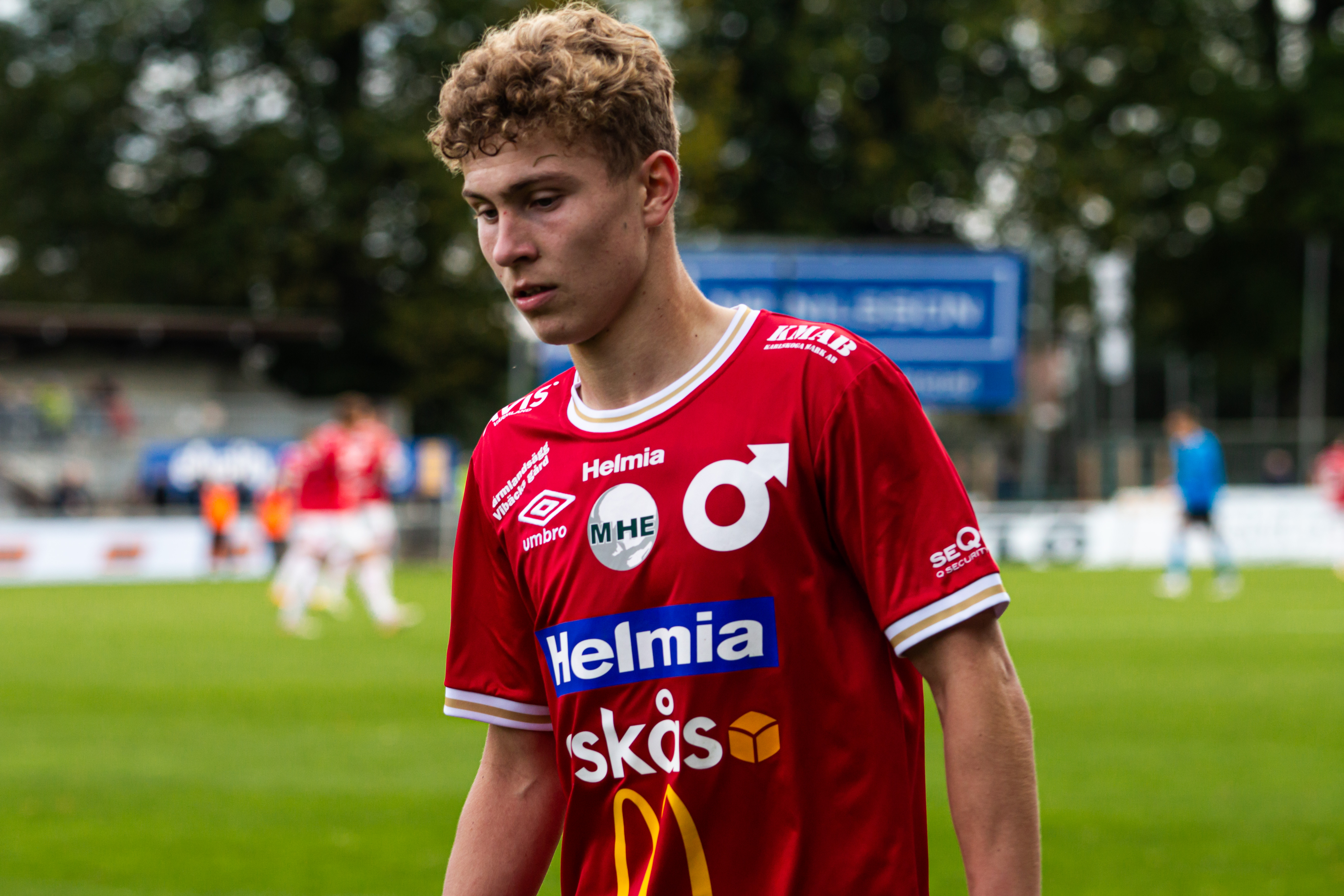
- Bolin with Degerfors IF in 2023

Personal information
- Full name: Axel Hugo Bolin
- Date of birth: 24 July 2003 (age 23)
- Place of birth: Borås, Sweden
- Height: 1.79 m (5 ft 10 in)
- Position: Winger

Team information
- Current team: Borussia Mönchengladbach
- Number: 38

Youth career
- –2018: Sjömarkens IF
- 2019–2021: Malmö FF

Senior career*
Years	Team	Apps	(Gls)
2019	Sandareds IF	3	(1)
2022–2026	Malmö FF	60	(15)
2022	→ BK Olympic (loan)	29	(8)
2023	→ Degerfors IF (loan)	9	(1)
2026	→ Borussia Mönchengladbach (loan)	13	(1)
2026–	Borussia Mönchengladbach	7	(2)

International career^{‡}
2019	Sweden U17	3	(0)
2023–2024	Sweden U21	5	(4)
2024–	Sweden	3	(0)
- * Club domestic league appearances and goals as of 22:28, 23 October 2026 (UTC) ‡ National team caps and goals as of 18:34, 6 October 2026 (UTC)

Axel Hugo Bolin (born 24 July 2003) is a Swedish professional footballer who plays as a winger for German Bundesliga club Borussia Mönchengladbach and the Sweden national team.

== Early life and career ==
Bolin was born and raised in Borås, Sweden, where he began his football career with the local club Sjömarkens IF. Bolin comes from an athletic family; his father, Stefan Bolin, was a player for Sjömarkens IF, and his mother, Catarina, was a gymnast. Between the ages 10–14, he trialled several times a year with Chelsea, being teammates with Jamal Musiala among others. Bolin made his senior debut at the age of fifteen, recording 1 goal in 3 appearances in the Swedish 6th tier with Sandareds IF, the affiliate club of his youth team Sjömarkens IF.

== Club career ==
=== Malmö FF ===
Having chosen to sign for the academy of Malmö FF at the age of sixteen – ahead of Borås' most decorated club IF Elfsborg – Bolin was later promoted to Malmö FF's first team prior to the 2022 season. Shortly after it was announced that Bolin would spend the season with BK Olympic on loan in Ettan Södra. In his first full season of senior football he registered 8 goals in 29 league appearances, and later praised head coach Mesut Meral for his development: "The coach Mesut (Meral) has been great. He has been clear about what he wants and he builds roles so that you know what to do in every situation. We also played in a way that I like."

Bolin returned to Malmö FF for the 2023 season, and made his first Allsvenskan start against Degerfors IF on 5 June 2023 in the final match of his close friend Hugo Larsson, providing an assist in the 5–0 win. With playing time being sparse, Bolin was later in the summer sent on loan to just Degerfors IF. There, he scored his first Allsvenskan goal on 28 October 2023 in a 1–1 draw against Varbergs BoIS. He made headlines in the penultimate round of the league for his sacrificing defensive rush in the final minutes of a game against IF Elfsborg, where a goal by his hometown club would have secured the league title ahead of Malmö FF.

=== Borussia Mönchengladbach ===
On 2 February 2026, Bolin was loaned by Borussia Mönchengladbach in Germany, with an option to buy. One and a half month later, the Bundesliga club exercised their option, signing Bolin on a contract until the summer of 2030. On 16 May 2026, the last matchday of the 2025–26 Bundesliga, he scored his first goal for the club in a 4–0 win against Hoffenheim.

== International career ==
Bolin made his full international debut for the Sweden national team on 14 October 2024, replacing Sebastian Nanasi in the 83rd minute of a UEFA Nations League game against Estonia which Sweden won 3–0.

== Career statistics ==
=== Club ===
As of 27 October 2026

Appearances and goals by club, season and competition
Club	Season	Division	League		Cup		Continental		Total	
Club	Season	Division	Apps	Goals	Apps	Goals	Apps	Goals	Apps	Goals
Sandareds IF	2019	Division 4	3	1	—		—		3	1
Malmö FF	2022	Allsvenskan	0	0	1	0	0	0	1	0
Malmö FF	2023	Allsvenskan	7	0	3	0	—		10	0
Malmö FF	2024	Allsvenskan	25	10	5	0	12 (Note: Six appearances and two goals in UEFA Champions League, six appearances in UEFA Europa League)	2	42	12
Malmö FF	2025	Allsvenskan	28	5	1	0	14 (Note: Six appearances and one goal in UEFA Champions League, eight appearances and one goal in UEFA Europa League)	2	40	7
Malmö FF	Total		60	15	10	0	26	4	93	19
Olympic (loan)	2022	Ettan Fotboll	29	8	0	0	—		29	8
Degerfors IF (loan)	2023	Allsvenskan	9	1	—		—		9	1
Borussia Mönchengladbach (loan)	2025–26	Bundesliga	13	1	—		—		13	1
Borussia Mönchengladbach	2026–27	Bundesliga	7	2	2	2	—		9	4
Career total			122	28	12	2	26	4	156	34

=== International ===
As of 5 October 2026

Appearances and goals by national team and year
National team	Year	Apps	Goals
Sweden	2024	1	0
Sweden	2025	1	0
Sweden	2026	1	0
Total		3	0

== Honours ==
Malmö FF

- Allsvenskan: 2023, 2024
- Svenska Cupen: 2023–24
