= Nils Zätterström =

Swedish footballer (born 2005)

Personal information
- Full name: Nils Erik Ulf Zätterström
- Date of birth: 29 March 2005 (age 21)
- Place of birth: Malmö, Sweden
- Height: 1.92 m (6 ft 4 in)
- Position: Centre-back

Team information
- Current team: Raków Częstochowa (on loan from Sheffield United)
- Number: 19

Youth career
- –2012: LB07
- 2013–2023: Malmö FF

Senior career*
Years	Team	Apps	(Gls)
2024–2025	Malmö FF	24	(2)
2025–	Sheffield United	0	(0)
2026	→ Genoa (loan)	3	(0)
2026–	→ Raków Częstochowa (loan)	0	(0)

International career^{‡}
2022	Sweden U17	1	(0)
2023	Sweden U19	3	(0)
2024–2026	Sweden U21	12	(0)
2024	Sweden	1	(0)
- * Club domestic league appearances and goals as of 25 May 2026 ‡ National team caps and goals as of 17:57, 4 June 2026 (UTC)

Nils Erik Ulf Zätterström (born 29 March 2005) is a Swedish professional footballer who plays as a centre-back for Ekstraklasa club Raków Częstochowa, on loan from EFL Championship club Sheffield United.

== Club career ==
=== Malmö ===
On 12 March 2024, Zätterström signed a five-year contract with Malmö FF.

Zätterström scored his first professional goal with Malmö FF on 19 July 2024, scoring the winning goal in a 4–3 win against IK Sirius.

On 23 July 2024, Zätterström made his Champions' League debut appearance in a 4–1 win against Faroe Islands side KI Klaksvík in the 2024–25 UEFA Champions League qualifying phase. In the second leg of the next round against PAOK, Zätterström scored his first Champions' League goal, a late equaliser taking the game into extra time. During extra time, he provided an assist for teammate Anders Christiansen, who subsequently scored and won Malmö the game, taking them to the playoff phase.

=== Sheffield United ===
On 22 August 2025, Zätterström signed for EFL Championship club Sheffield United on a four-year contract for an undisclosed fee.

==== Loan to Genoa ====
On 23 January 2026, Zätterström joined Genoa on loan for the remainder of the 2025–26 season, with an option to buy included.

==== Loan to Raków Częstochowa ====
On 8 September 2026, Zätterström moved to Ekstraklasa club Raków Częstochowa on a season-long loan, with an option to make the move permanent.

== International career ==
On 13 March 2024, Zätterström was selected for the Sweden U21 squad. However, due to a hand injury and in need of surgery, Zätterström was replaced by Elias Olsson.

Ahead of the November international break where Sweden would face Slovakia and Azerbaijan, Zätterström was called up from under-21 squad due to unavailable and injured players. On 19 November 2024, Zätterström made his debut appearance for Sweden, coming on as a late substitute for Gabriel Gudmundsson in a 6–0 win against Azerbaijan.

== Personal life ==
Zätterström's father Christian represented Sweden's national handball team in the 1970s and played professionally in France in the 1980s, after winning the domestic league with Lugi in 1980.

== Career statistics ==
As of match played 24 May 2026

Appearances and goals by club, season and competition
Club	Season	League			National cup (Note: Includes Svenska Cupen)		League cup		Continental		Other		Total	
Club	Season	Division	Apps	Goals	Apps	Goals	Apps	Goals	Apps	Goals	Apps	Goals	Apps	Goals
Malmö FF	2024	Allsvenskan	14	2	1	0	—		10 (Note: Five appearances and one goal in UEFA Champions League, five appearances in UEFA Europa League)	1	—		25	3
Malmö FF	2025	Allsvenskan	10	0	4	0	—		2 (Note: Appearances in UEFA Champions League)	0	—		16	0
Malmö FF	Total		24	2	5	0	—		12	1	—		41	3
Sheffield United	2025–26	Championship	0	0	0	0	0	0	—		—		0	0
Genoa (loan)	2025–26	Serie A	3	0	—		—		—		—		3	0
Raków Częstochowa (loan)	2026–27	Ekstraklasa	0	0	0	0	—		—		—		0	0
Career totals			27	2	5	0	0	0	12	1	0	0	44	3

== Honours ==
Malmö FF

- Allsvenskan: 2024
- Svenska Cupen: 2023–24
