= Colin Rösler =

Norwegian footballer (born 2000)

Personal information
- Date of birth: 22 April 2000 (age 26)
- Place of birth: Berlin, Germany
- Height: 1.86 m (6 ft 1 in)
- Position: Centre-back

Team information
- Current team: AGF
- Number: 25

Youth career
- 2005–2006: Fjellhamar
- 2006–2007: Hinna
- 2007–2010: Viking
- 2010–2019: Manchester City

Senior career*
Years	Team	Apps	(Gls)
2019–2021	NAC Breda	44	(1)
2022	Lillestrøm	21	(1)
2023–2024	Mjällby AIF	44	(1)
2024–2026	Malmö FF	45	(2)
2026–	AGF	0	(0)

International career^{‡}
2015	Norway U15	4	(1)
2015	England U16	4	(0)
2016	Norway U16	13	(1)
2016–2017	Norway U17	9	(0)
2018	Norway U18	8	(0)
2018–2021	Norway U19	12	(0)
2020–2022	Norway U21	4	(0)
2024	Norway	1	(0)
- * Club domestic league appearances and goals as of 3 August 2026 ‡ National team caps and goals as of 17 November 2024

Colin Rösler (born 22 April 2000) is a professional footballer who plays as a centre-back for Danish Superliga club AGF. Born in Germany, he represents the Norway national team.

Rösler was born in Berlin, Germany, and grew up in both Norway and England. After progressing through Manchester City's academy, he joined Dutch club NAC Breda in 2019. After 44 league appearances for NAC, Rösler joined Norwegian club Lillestrøm for the 2022 season. He has represented both Norway and England in youth internationals but pledged international allegiance to Norway in 2016.

== Early life ==
Rösler is the son of German football manager and former East Germany international footballer Uwe Rösler. His mother is from Norway. He was named after Manchester City legend Colin Bell, whilst his younger brother Tony was named after fellow City legend Tony Book.

Rösler was born in Berlin, but his family moved to Lillestrøm in 2002. He moved to England aged 10, and joined Manchester City's academy a year later.

== Club career ==
After progressing through Manchester City's youth academy, Rösler signed for Eerste Divisie club NAC Breda on a three-year contract in August 2019. He joined NAC on a free transfer as part of a partnership between the two clubs. He initially played in central defence for Breda alongside Roger Riera. He played 11 games for NAC during the 2019–20 Eerste Divisie season. He made 25 appearances during the 2020–21 season, including scoring his first senior goal from close range in a 3–1 win over De Graafschap in March 2021. As his spell at NAC continued, Rösler was increasingly overlooked and made just 8 appearances during the 2021–22 season.

On 30 December 2021, it was announced that Rösler had signed for Eliteserien club Lillestrøm SK on a contract until 2024. Lillestrøm paid no transfer fee to NAC, but NAC retained a sell-on fee in Rösler's contract.

On 28 December 2022, it was announced that Rösler would join Allsvenskan club Mjällby AIF for the 2023 season. He signed a three-year contract.

On 5 August 2024, Malmö FF bought the centre-back for a reported sum of 11 million SEK after the departure of Derek Cornelius. Rösler made his debut appearance for Malmö on 10 August in a 1-0 victory against Halmstads BK.

In 2026 he joined Danish team Aarhus GF. He made his debut for the club in the third round of the 2026–27 Champions League qualifiers, where AGF beat Azerbaijani Sabah FK 2-1.

== International career ==
Rösler was capped four times by Norway at under-15 level in 2015, scoring in their 4–4 draw with Northern Ireland. He subsequently played internationally for England under-16s, but in February 2016, pledged international allegiance to Norway. He subsequently played for Norway at under-16, under-17, under-18, under-19 and under-21 levels.

Rösler made his debut for Norway national team on 17 November 2024 in a Nations League game against Kazakhstan at Ullevaal Stadion. He substituted the hat-trick scorer Erling Haaland in the 86th minute, as Norway won 5–0.

== Career statistics ==
As of matches played 20 July 2026

Appearances and goals by club, season and competition
Club	Season	League			National cup (Note: Appearances in KNVB Cup, Norwegian Football Cup and Svenska Cupen)		Europe		Other		Total	
Club	Season	Division	Apps	Goals	Apps	Goals	Apps	Goals	Apps	Goals	Apps	Goals
Manchester City U23	2018–19	—			—		—		5 (Note: Appearances in the EFL Trophy)	0	5	0
NAC Breda	2019–20	Eerste Divisie	11	0	2	0	—		0	0	13	0
NAC Breda	2020–21	Eerste Divisie	25	1	0	0	—		0	0	25	1
NAC Breda	2021–22	Eerste Divisie	8	0	1	0	—		0	0	9	0
NAC Breda	Total		44	1	3	0	—		0	0	47	1
Lillestrøm	2022	Eliteserien	14	0	3	0	2 (Note: Appearances in UEFA Europa Conference League)	1	—		19	1
Mjällby AIF	2023	Allsvenskan	30	1	7	0	—		—		37	1
Mjällby AIF	2024	Allsvenskan	14	0	4	1	—		—		18	1
Mjällby AIF	Total		44	1	11	1	—		0	0	55	2
Malmö	2024	Allsvenskan	11	0	0	0	10 (Note: Two appearances in UEFA Champions League and eight appearances in UEFA Europa League)	0	—		21	0
Malmö	2025	Allsvenskan	24	2	1	0	13 (Note: Six appearances in UEFA Champions League, seven appearances in UEFA Europa League)	0	—		38	2
Malmö	2026	Allsvenskan	10	0	4	0	2 (Note: Appearances in UEFA Europa League)	0	—		16	0
Malmö	Total		45	2	5	0	25	0	0	0	75	2
AGF	2026–27	Danish Superliga	0	0	0	0	0	0	—		0	0
Career total			147	4	22	1	27	1	5	0	201	4
