= Martin Olsson =

Swedish footballer

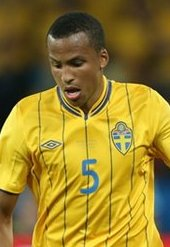
- Olsson playing for Sweden at UEFA Euro 2012

Personal information
- Full name: Martin Tony Waikwa Olsson
- Date of birth: 17 May 1988 (age 38)
- Place of birth: Gävle, Sweden
- Height: 1.77 m (5 ft 10 in)
- Position: Left-back

Youth career
- 2005–2006: Högaborgs BK
- 2006–2007: Blackburn Rovers

Senior career*
Years	Team	Apps	(Gls)
2007–2013	Blackburn Rovers	117	(3)
2013–2017	Norwich City	119	(3)
2017–2019	Swansea City	68	(2)
2020	Helsingborgs IF	25	(0)
2021	BK Häcken	10	(1)
2021–2026	Malmö FF	70	(2)

International career
2006–2007	Sweden U19	13	(1)
2007–2010	Sweden U21	23	(1)
2010–2023	Sweden	56	(5)
- * Club domestic league appearances and goals as of 23:32, 30 January 2026 (UTC)

Martin Tony Waikwa Olsson (born 17 May 1988) is a Swedish professional footballer who plays as a left-back.

Olsson signed for Blackburn Rovers from Högaborgs BK in January 2006. In 2013, Premier League side Norwich City signed him for an undisclosed fee. In January 2017, he left Norwich to join Swansea until 2019. In 2020, he signed with Allsvenskan club Helsingborgs IF in his native Sweden before moving on to represent both BK Häcken and Malmö FF.

A full international between 2010 and 2023, Olsson won 56 caps for the Sweden national team and represented his country at UEFA Euro 2012 and 2016 as well as the 2018 FIFA World Cup.

== Club career ==
=== Blackburn Rovers ===
Olsson began his playing career in Sweden by playing for Högaborgs BK, where former national star Henrik Larsson began his career. Olsson was working his way through the youth setup at the club in 2005–06. His talent attracted the attention of football clubs in Europe and in January 2006 Premier League club Blackburn Rovers signed him for their youth academy.

He made his Blackburn debut in the UEFA Cup qualifier in the 2007–08 season as a late substitution for Stephen Warnock.

He made his Premier League debut against Derby County in a 2–1 victory on 30 December 2007, coming on as an 84th-minute substitute for Morten Gamst Pedersen at Pride Park, in front of a crowd of 30,048 spectators and the referee was Peter Walton. He was voted Blackburn's Young Player of the Year for the season 2007–08.

In May 2008, Olsson signed a new four-year contract, keeping him at Blackburn until June 2012.

On 24 September 2008, Olsson scored his first Blackburn goal, scoring the winning goal in a League Cup tie against Everton. The goal turned out to be the only goal of the match. On 20 January 2010, he scored a spectacular overhead kick in a 6–4 League Cup semi-final defeat against Aston Villa in the 63rd minute at Villa Park.

On 23 November 2009, Olsson was sent off for two yellow card offences on Tottenham Hotspur winger Aaron Lennon. He scored his first Premier League goal on 10 February against Hull City at Ewood Park in a 1–0 victory. Olsson made his 25th league appearance at home to Birmingham City on 24 March 2010 in a 2–1 win. On 28 March 2010, when he made his 40th appearance for Blackburn against Burnley in the East Lancashire derby at Turf Moor in the 1–0 victory, he caused controversy when he looked like he had dived inside Burnley's penalty area, consequently by winning a penalty after taking the ball round Burnley goalkeeper Brian Jensen. Subsequently, the penalty was scored by David Dunn. On 29 March 2010, Olsson admitted to the dive, Rovers manager, Sam Allardyce defended Olsson by saying he was his man of the match and created havoc and chaos in and around the eighteen yard box all match.

In June 2010, Olsson signed a new five-year deal at Blackburn Rovers that would keep him at the club until summer 2015. At the start of the 2010–11 season, Olsson acquired the number three jersey by manager Sam Allardyce, which he had for most of pre-season. He featured in Rovers' opening 2010–11 Premier League match against Everton at Ewood Park on 14 August 2010, playing the full 90 minutes on the left-wing in a 1–0 victory. He scored his first league goal for Blackburn against Liverpool inside 32 minutes on 5 January 2011 in a 3–1 victory at Ewood Park. On 12 February 2011, Olsson made his 50th Premier League appearance for the club when he started at left-back against Newcastle United playing the full 90 minutes in a 0–0 draw. On 30 April 2011, he scored with a left-foot shot on 20 minutes against local rivals Bolton Wanderers at home. On 22 May, Olsson started and played the full 90 minutes against Wolverhampton Wanderers in a 3–2 win at Molineux which kept both teams up for another season in the Premier League. At the end of the season, he made 32 appearances for Rovers in total and scored two goals in all competitions.

Now considered a key player, Olsson started off the season at left back covering for Gaël Givet who himself was covering for various injuries at centre back. Olsson provided an assist in a 4–3 victory over Arsenal. After running from the halfway line to the by-line, he pulled back a cross for Arsenal's Laurent Koscielny to score an own goal. After helping Sweden qualify for UEFA Euro 2012, Olsson returned from international duty to put in a Man of the Match performance on the left wing against Queens Park Rangers in a 1–1 draw at Loftus Road. At the end of the season, Olsson made 31 appearances in all competitions for Rovers as they were relegated after finishing in 19th place in the Premier League with just 31 points to their name.

After picking up a minor injury in pre-season, Olsson made his comeback as an unused substitute on 28 August, against Milton Keynes Dons at Stadium mk in a 2–1 defeat as Blackburn were knocked out in the second round of the League Cup.

=== Norwich City ===
On 10 July 2013, Olsson was signed by Premier League side Norwich City for an undisclosed fee. He signed a four-year deal at Carrow Road. He scored his first goal for the club against Bury in the League Cup on 27 August 2013. Olsson made 37 appearances in all competitions but could not prevent his new team from relegation in his return to Premier League football.

On the opening day of the 2014–15 season, Olsson was sent off for two bookable offences in a 1–0 defeat to Wolverhampton Wanderers in the Championship. He was later charged with improper conduct by the FA for allegedly making physical contact with referee Simon Hooper. On 18 August, Olsson's ban was extended by a further three matches after the FA found him guilty of improper conduct, which Norwich announced they would not contend. He was also fined £3,000. He returned from suspension for the match away at Cardiff City where, with Norwich two goals down, he scored the first goal in a comeback that saw Norwich win the match 4–2. From then on, he would be a permanent feature in the Norwich team, appearing in 42 of the 46 league matches, as the team finished third in the league to qualify for the Championship play-offs. Olsson played in all three matches including the 2–0 victory over Middlesbrough in the final at Wembley Stadium, which saw Norwich return to the Premier League at the first attempt.

Olsson would however make fewer appearances in the 2015–16 Premier League season, only appearing in 24 of the 38 league matches, including four appearances as a substitute, with Robbie Brady often being preferred at left-back. He would however score a dramatic winner on 2 April 2016 against Newcastle United. With the match 2–2 going into stoppage time, Olsson scored with a long-distance shot to give Norwich a 3–2 win. The win was ultimately in vain however, as Norwich were relegated to the Championship again at the end of the season. The relegation was confirmed after Sunderland won 3–0 against Everton where the Canaries were four points off safety.

For the 2016–17 season, Olsson was given the number 3 shirt and would once more be a regular in the side, appearing in 19 of the first 26 league matches. He scored another goal for Norwich, the first in a 3–1 win over Burton Albion, and also receive another red card two minutes into a match against Queens Park Rangers when he handled to prevent a goal. Although QPR missed the resulting penalty, Norwich ultimately lost the match 2–1. His last appearance for Norwich was in a 2–2 draw against Southampton in the FA Cup.

=== Swansea City ===
On 17 January 2017, it was announced that Olsson had signed for Premier League club Swansea City for around £4 million. Olsson scored his first goal on 12 February 2017 in a match against reigning champions Leicester City in a 2–0 victory for the Welsh club.

Olsson became a first team regular in the 2017–18 season, making a total of 36 appearances, but could not prevent the club with relegation at the end of that season. This meant that Olsson was set for a fourth Premier League relegation, same as Robert Green and former Norwich teammate Sébastien Bassong, but one off the current record holders Hermann Hreiðarsson and Nathan Blake.

The club confirmed on 18 May 2019 that he will be released upon expiry of his contract.

=== Helsingborgs IF ===
Olsson signed for Helsingborgs IF on a one-year contract ahead of the 2020 Allsvenskan season and played in 25 league games as Helsingborg was relegated to Superettan.

=== Häcken BK ===
After Helsingborg's relegation to Superettan, Olsson left the club to sign for the Allsvenskan club BK Häcken. He made 10 Allsvenskan appearances for the club during the 2021 season before being bought by the reigning Swedish Champions Malmö FF.

=== Malmö FF ===
On 12 August 2021, Malmö FF announced the signing of Olsson.

On 19 January 2023, Malmö's manager Henrik Rydström announced that Olsson had been partially suspended from training and the team's match squad due to repeated late arrival for meetings and training sessions.

On 3 March 2024, during the final game of the Swedish Cup group stage, Varberg forward Yusuf Abdulazeez was shown a second yellow and subsequently a red card after a tackle on Derek Cornelius. In the commotion that ensued, Olsson punched Robin Tranberg in the jaw and was instantly shown a red card. A police report was filed against Olsson but Malmö Police dismissed it shortly after. Following the incident, the Swedish Football Association punished Olsson with a five match suspension until April 22, 2024.

== International career ==
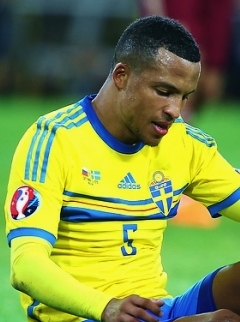
Olsson playing for Sweden in 2015

Olsson has played several matches for Sweden's under 18 and under 21 national squads.

He was selected to be part of the senior 23-man squad that would face Bosnia and Herzegovina on 29 May and Belarus on 2 June 2010. Against Bosnia and Herzegovina, Olsson put Sweden back in front from close range in the 68th minute, two minutes after coming on as a substitute, and added his second in the 82nd from Marcus Berg's center. On 6 September 2011, he made his first start for the national team, playing at left back, and scored Sweden's third goal in the 81st minute of the 5–0 victory over San Marino after a clever reverse pass by Zlatan Ibrahimović in a Group E Euro 2012 qualifying fixture. In May 2012, Olsson was named in the 23-man squad to compete for Sweden at UEFA Euro 2012 and was given the number 5 shirt.

In May 2018 he was named in Sweden's 23 man squad for the 2018 World Cup in Russia.

On 6 November 2026, the Swedish Football Association announced that Olsson had retired from international football. He won 56 caps and scored five goals between 2010 and 2023.

== Personal life ==
Olsson was born in Gävle, Sweden, to a Swedish father and Kenyan mother. He has a twin brother, Marcus, who also is a professional footballer. His brother-in-law is former Dallas Mavericks basketball player Dirk Nowitzki, who is married to Martin's sister Jessica Olsson.

His agent used to be the former Sweden international player Stefan Schwarz. Controversial agent Rune Hauge has also worked for Olsson, after being introduced to him by former Blackburn Rovers teammate Morten Gamst Pedersen.

== Career statistics ==
=== Club ===
As of match played 29 January 2025

Appearances and goals by club, season and competition
Club	Season	League			National cup		League cup		Other		Total	
Club	Season	Division	Apps	Goals	Apps	Goals	Apps	Goals	Apps	Goals	Apps	Goals
Blackburn Rovers	2007–08	Premier League	2	0	0	0	1	0	1 (Note: Appearance in UEFA Cup)	0	4	0
Blackburn Rovers	2008–09	Premier League	9	0	3	0	3	1	—		15	1
Blackburn Rovers	2009–10	Premier League	21	1	1	0	5	1	—		27	2
Blackburn Rovers	2010–11	Premier League	29	2	1	0	2	0	—		32	2
Blackburn Rovers	2011–12	Premier League	27	0	1	0	3	0	—		31	0
Blackburn Rovers	2012–13	Championship	29	0	4	0	0	0	—		33	0
Blackburn Rovers	Total		117	3	10	0	14	2	1	0	142	5
Norwich City	2013–14	Premier League	34	0	1	0	2	1	—		37	1
Norwich City	2014–15	Championship	42	1	0	0	0	0	3 (Note: Appearances in Championship play-offs)	0	45	1
Norwich City	2015–16	Premier League	24	1	1	0	2	0	—		27	1
Norwich City	2016–17	Championship	19	1	1	0	0	0	—		20	1
Norwich City	Total		119	3	3	0	4	1	3	0	129	4
Swansea City	2016–17	Premier League	15	2	0	0	0	0	—		15	2
Swansea City	2017–18	Premier League	36	0	4	0	3	0	—		43	0
Swansea City	2018–19	Championship	17	0	4	0	3	0	—		24	0
Swansea City	Total		68	2	8	0	6	0	0	0	82	2
Helsingborg	2020	Allsvenskan	25	0	0	0	—		—		25	0
Häcken	2021	Allsvenskan	10	1	1	0	—		1 (Note: Appearance in UEFA Conference League)	1	12	2
Malmö FF	2021	Allsvenskan	13	0	0	0	—		6 (Note: Appearances in UEFA Champions League)	0	19	0
Malmö FF	2022	Allsvenskan	16	0	6	0	—		9 (Note: Appearances in UEFA Champions League and Europa League)	1	31	1
Malmö FF	2023	Allsvenskan	20	1	4	0	—		—		24	1
Malmö FF	2024	Allsvenskan	15	0	1	0	—		2 (Note: Appearance in UEFA Conference League)	0	18	0
Malmö FF	Total		64	1	11	0	0	0	17	1	92	2
Career total			391	9	33	0	24	3	28	2	482	15

=== International ===
Appearances and goals by national team and year
National team	Year	Apps	Goals
Sweden	2010	1	2
Sweden	2011	6	2
Sweden	2012	7	0
Sweden	2013	8	1
Sweden	2014	4	0
Sweden	2015	7	0
Sweden	2016	7	0
Sweden	2017	1	0
Sweden	2018	7	0
Sweden	2019	0	0
Sweden	2020	3	0
Sweden	2021	3	0
Sweden	2022	1	0
Sweden	2023	1	0
Total		56	5

Scores and results list Sweden's goal tally first, score column indicates score after each Olsson goal.

List of international goals scored by Martin Olsson
No.	Date	Venue	Cap	Opponent	Score	Result	Competition
1	29 May 2010	Råsunda Stadium, Solna, Sweden	1	Bosnia and Herzegovina	2–1	4–2	Friendly
2	29 May 2010	Råsunda Stadium, Solna, Sweden	1	Bosnia and Herzegovina	3–1	4–2	Friendly
3	6 September 2011	Stadio Olimpico, Serravalle, San Marino	4	San Marino	3–0	5–0	UEFA Euro 2012 qualifying
4	7 October 2011	Helsinki Olympic Stadium, Helsinki, Finland	5	Finland	2–1	2–1	UEFA Euro 2012 qualifying
5	11 October 2013	Friends Arena, Solna, Sweden	19	Austria	1–1	2–1	2014 FIFA World Cup qualification

== Honours ==
Norwich City

- Football League Championship play-offs: 2015

Malmö FF

- Allsvenskan: 2021, 2023, 2024
- Svenska Cupen: 2021–22, 2023–24

Individual

- Swedish Defender of the Year: 2013
- Stor Grabb: 2013
