= Adrian Skogmar =

Swedish footballer

Personal information
- Full name: Adrian Siam Skogmar
- Date of birth: 23 November 2005 (age 20)
- Place of birth: Sweden
- Height: 1.75 m (5 ft 9 in)
- Position: Midfielder

Team information
- Current team: Malmö FF
- Number: 37

Youth career
- 2011–2023: Malmö FF

Senior career*
Years	Team	Apps	(Gls)
2023–	Malmö FF	55	(5)

International career^{‡}
2021	Sweden U17	2	(0)
2023–2024	Sweden U19	5	(0)
2024	Sweden U21	2	(0)
- * Club domestic league appearances and goals as of 19 September 2026 ‡ National team caps and goals as of 18:03, 18 November 2024 (UTC)

Adrian Siam Skogmar (born 23 November 2005) is a Swedish professional footballer who plays as a midfielder for Allsvenskan club Malmö FF.

== Club career ==
Skogmar grew up in the Limhamn neighbourhood of Malmö, and he has two siblings. He joined the youth academy of Malmö FF in 2011. In 2022 he won the P17 Allsvenskan with the under-17s, and the following year he began to train regularly with the first team. He made his senior and Allsvenskan debut against Sirius on 1 July 2023 when he came on as a substitute in the 85th minute. On 2 October 2023 he made his first Allsvenskan start in a 2–1 win against IF Brommapojkarna. He became Malmö FF's youngest starting debutant since Mattias Svanberg, seven years prior. On 24 February 2024, Skogmar scored his first goal in an 8–0 victory against IFK Luleå in Svenska Cupen. Malmö FF would later go on to win the 2023–24 Svenska Cupen in May 2024 and at the end of the season the club retained their Allsvenskan title. A few weeks later, Skogmar's contract was extended until the end of 2028.

In the beginning of 2025 Skogmar still struggled to find his place in the team, and there was concrete interest from second-tier club Landskrona BoIS regarding a season-long loan, which ultimately never materialized. He entered a good run of form towards the end of the 2025 summer. Against Sigma Olomouc, on 21 August 2025, he made his second consecutive start for the first time in his career, taking a spot from Norway international Lasse Berg Johnsen, as Malmö FF recorded a convincing 3–0 win. Skogmar received praise for his performance, and Malmö FF captain Pontus Jansson said that "[Skogmar] has something different from many midfielders in Sweden. He is unique in that way and plays with great courage, which I love when young players have". 10 days later, in a 1–1 draw against Degerfors IF, he scored his first Allsvenskan goal. Although it was a disappointing season for the club as they finished 7th in the league, Skogmar's development was highlighted as one of the bright spots of the year. He finished the season with 21 appearances and 1 goal in the league.

Following an injury-riddled winter Skogmar slowly became a starter again under new head coach Miguel Ángel Ramírez, after he both assisted and scored a goal in a 2–3 loss to IK Sirius on 24 April 2026. He ended the spring period with 3 goals in 9 Allsvenskan appearances.

== International career ==
Skogmar is a youth international for Sweden. He is also eligible to represent Thailand internationally. In Thai media it has erroneously been reported several times that Skogmar has chosen to play for Thailand.

== Personal life ==
Skogmar was born in Sweden to a Swedish father and Thai mother. His middle name is Siam, after the former name of Thailand.

His nickname is "S", which was coined to differentiate Skogmar from the many Adrians in the youth teams, such as his peer Adrian Zendelovski.

== Career statistics ==
As of match played 19 September 2026

Appearances and goals by club, season and competition
Club	Season	Division	League		Cup		Europe		Other		Total	
Club	Season	Division	Apps	Goals	Apps	Goals	Apps	Goals	Apps	Goals	Apps	Goals
Malmö FF	2023	Allsvenskan	5	0	1	0	—		—		6	0
Malmö FF	2024	Allsvenskan	8	0	5	1	1 (Note: Appearances in UEFA Europa League)	0	—		14	1
Malmö FF	2025	Allsvenskan	21	1	1	0	11 (Note: Three appearances in UEFA Champions League, eight appearances in UEFA Europa League)	0	—		33	1
Malmö FF	2026	Allsvenskan	21	4	0	0	1	0	—		22	4
Career total			55	5	7	1	13	0	0	0	75	6

== Honours ==
Malmö FF

- Allsvenskan: 2023, 2024
- Svenska Cupen: 2023–24 Svenska Cupen
