= Sebastian Nanasi =

Swedish footballer (born 2002)

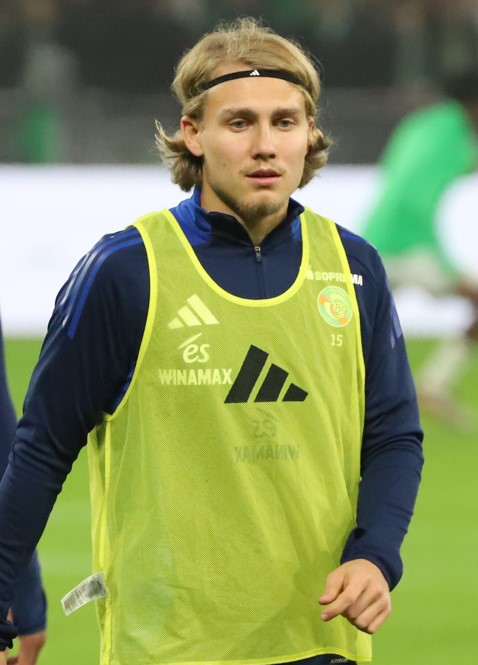
- Nanasi with Strasbourg in 2024

Personal information
- Full name: Algot Sebastian Nanasi
- Date of birth: 16 May 2002 (age 24)
- Place of birth: Kristianstad, Sweden
- Height: 1.78 m (5 ft 10 in)
- Positions: Midfielder; forward

Team information
- Current team: Strasbourg
- Number: 11

Youth career
- Viby IF
- –2018: Kristianstad
- 2018–2020: Malmö FF

Senior career*
Years	Team	Apps	(Gls)
2018	Kristianstad	11	(2)
2020–2024	Malmö FF	68	(18)
2020	→ Varbergs BoIS (loan)	6	(0)
2022	→ Kalmar FF (loan)	16	(5)
2024–	Strasbourg	58	(13)

International career^{‡}
2018–2019	Sweden U17	18	(9)
2019–2021	Sweden U19	6	(2)
2023–2024	Sweden U21	8	(1)
2023–	Sweden	15	(3)
- * Club domestic league appearances and goals as of 21:03, 21 November 2026 (UTC) ‡ National team caps and goals as of 21:53, 14 November 2026 (UTC)

Algot Sebastian Nanasi (born 16 May 2002) is a Swedish professional footballer who plays as a midfielder or forward for Ligue 1 club Strasbourg and the Sweden national team.

== Club career ==
=== Early career ===
Nanasi started with Viby IF, before moving to Kristianstad in the Ettan. On 7 April 2018, he made his league debut with Kristiansad at age 15, in a 2–1 loss against Eskilsminne, coming on for Emmanuel Okine. He joined Malmö FF's under 19s in August 2018.

=== Malmö FF and loan spells ===
After scoring 22 goals in 11 matches in the U19 Allsvenskan in 2019, Nanasi was given a first-team contract. Nanasi was loaned to newly promoted Varbergs BoIS in the Allsvenskan in 2020. He made his league debut in a 2–1 loss against IFK Göteborg on 18 June 2020, coming on for Alibek Aliev. He would only make 6 appearances before returning to his parent club at the end of the 2020 season. On 21 February 2021, Nanasi made his Malmö debut, coming off the bench in a 2–1 home loss in the group stage of the Svenska Cupen to Västerås. Nanasi extended his contract with Malmö in March 2021 to 2023, and extended it again in December 2021, making it valid until 2025. Nanasi made his UEFA Champions League debut on 14 September 2021 against Juventus at home in a 3–0 loss, coming on for Bonke Innocent. On 25 September 2021, Nanasi scored his first Allsvenskan goal against Örebro SK in a 5–1 victory, a rebound from a shot taken by Veljko Birmančević.

On 20 July 2022, it was announced that Nanasi would be joining fellow Allsvenskan side Kalmar FF for the rest of the season. He made his debut in a 1–0 against IF Elfsborg on 24 July 2022, and scored his first goal against his former team Varberg on 5 September. He would finish the season with 16 matches, 5 goals and 6 assists, helping the team reach 4th in the Allsvenskan.

Nanasi won the 2023 Allsvenskan with Malmö, scoring 11 goals and assisting, consequently winning both Allsvenskan Player of the Year and Midfielder of the Year.

=== Strasbourg ===
On 23 August 2024, the Ligue 1 club Strasbourg signed Nanasi for a reported sum of 11 million euro. Nanasi made his debut two days later for the French side, coming on in the 80th minute in a 3–1 victory against Rennes. On 30 August Nanasi made his first start debut against Lyon, furthermore scoring his first goal for Strasbourg two minutes after kick-off.

== International career ==
Nanasi made his full international debut for Sweden on 9 January 2023, replacing Yasin Ayari 82 minutes into a friendly 2–0 win against Finland. Nanasi scored his first international goal on 12 January in a 2–1 win against Estonia. On 14 October 2024, Nanasi scored two goals in a 3–0 away win against Estonia in Tallinn in the 2024–25 UEFA Nations League C.

== Personal life ==
Nanasi is of Hungarian descent through his grandfather. His father played floorball and, while born in Sweden, represented the Hungary national floorball team. Nanasi is a supporter of Liverpool FC.

Nanasi has one daughter with musician My Malmström.

== Career statistics ==
=== Club ===
As of 21 November 2026

Appearances and goals by club, season and competition
Club	Season	League			Cup		Continental		Other		Total	
Club	Season	Division	Apps	Goals	Apps	Goals	Apps	Goals	Apps	Goals	Apps	Goals
Kristianstad	2018	Ettan	11	2	0	0	—		—		11	2
Varbergs BoIS (loan)	2020	Allsvenskan	6	0	0	0	—		—		6	0
Malmö FF	2021	Allsvenskan	13	1	3	1	4	0	—		20	2
Malmö FF	2022	Allsvenskan	9	0	4	1	1	0	—		14	1
Malmö FF	2023	Allsvenskan	29	11	4	2	—		—		33	13
Malmö FF	2024	Allsvenskan	17	6	6	1	4	3	—		27	10
Malmö FF	Total		68	18	17	5	9	3	—		94	26
Kalmar FF (loan)	2022	Allsvenskan	16	5	0	0	—		—		16	5
Strasbourg	2024–25	Ligue 1	31	6	2	0	—		—		33	6
Strasbourg	2025–26	Ligue 1	19	7	4	1	11	2	—		34	10
Strasbourg	2026–27	Ligue 1	8	0	0	0	—		—		8	0
Strasbourg	Total		58	13	6	1	11	2	—		75	16
Career total			159	38	23	6	20	5	0	0	202	49

=== International ===
As of 14 November 2026

Appearances and goals by national team and year
National team	Year	Apps	Goals
Sweden	2023	2	0
Sweden	2024	4	3
Sweden	2025	3	0
Sweden	2026	6	0
Total		15	3

Scores and results list Sweden's goal tally first, score column indicates score after each Nanasi goal.

List of international goals scored by Sebastian Nanasi
No.	Date	Venue	Opponent	Score	Result	Competition	Ref.
1	12 January 2024	Stelios Kyriakides Stadium, Paphos, Cyprus	Estonia	1–1	2–1	Friendly	
2	14 October 2024	Lilleküla Stadium, Tallinn, Estonia	Estonia	1–0	3–0	2024–25 UEFA Nations League	
3	14 October 2024	Lilleküla Stadium, Tallinn, Estonia	Estonia	2–0	3–0	2024–25 UEFA Nations League	

== Honours ==
Malmö FF

- Allsvenskan: 2021, 2023, 2024
- Svenska Cupen: 2021–22, 2023–24

Individual

- Allsvenskan Player of the Year: 2023, 2024
- Allsvenskan Midfielder of the Year: 2023, 2024
