= 2022 Malmö FF season =

Malmö FF
2022 season
- Chairman: Anders Pålsson
- Head coach: Miloš Milojević (until 29 July); Andreas Georgson (between 29 July and 6 September); Åge Hareide (from 6 September)
- Stadium: Eleda Stadion
- Allsvenskan: 7th
- 2021–22 Svenska Cupen: Winners
- 2022–23 Svenska Cupen: Quarter-final
- 2022–23 UEFA Champions League: Second qualifying round
- 2022–23 UEFA Europa League: Group stage
- Top goalscorer: League: Isaac Kiese Thelin (12); All: Isaac Kiese Thelin (17)
- Highest home attendance: 20,231 (27 June vs Helsingborg, Allsvenskan)
- Average home league attendance: 17,410
Home colours	Away colours	Third colours

The 2022 season is Malmö FF's 111th in existence, their 87th season in Allsvenskan and their 22nd consecutive season in the league. They are competing in Allsvenskan, the 2021–22 Svenska Cupen, the 2022–23 Svenska Cupen, and the UEFA Champions League.

== Players ==
=== Squad ===
Note: Flags indicate national team as defined under FIFA eligibility rules; some limited exceptions apply. Players may hold more than one non-FIFA nationality.

No.	Pos.	Nation	Player
2	DF	SWE	Eric Larsson
3	DF	DEN	Jonas Knudsen
4	DF	FIN	Niklas Moisander
5	MF	DEN	Søren Rieks
6	MF	SWE	Oscar Lewicki
7	MF	MKD	Erdal Rakip
8	MF	PER	Sergio Peña
9	FW	SWE	Isaac Kiese Thelin
10	MF	DEN	Anders Christiansen (captain)
11	FW	SWE	Ola Toivonen (vice-captain)
13	DF	SWE	Martin Olsson
14	DF	SWE	Felix Beijmo
15	MF	SWE	Joseph Ceesay
17	FW	GHA	Malik Abubakari
18	MF	USA	Romain Gall
19	MF	SRB	Veljko Birmančević
20	MF	SWE	Moustafa Zeidan

No.	Pos.	Nation	Player
21	DF	BIH	Dennis Hadžikadunić
22	FW	BIH	Adi Nalić
23	DF	CZE	Matěj Chaluš
24	DF	DEN	Lasse Nielsen
25	MF	MLI	Mahamé Siby
26	MF	SWE	Mubaarak Nuh
27	GK	SWE	Johan Dahlin
28	MF	SWE	David Edvardsson
30	GK	MLI	Ismael Diawara
31	MF	SWE	Hugo Larsson
32	MF	NOR	Jo Inge Berget
33	FW	SLE	Mohamed Buya Turay
35	MF	SWE	Samuel Adrian
36	MF	KOS	Patriot Sejdiu
37	MF	SWE	Sebastian Nanasi
39	DF	CMR	Samuel Kotto
40	MF	GHA	Emmanuel Lomotey

=== Players in/out ===
==== In ====
No.	Pos.	Nat.	Name	Age	Moving from	Type	Transfer window	Ends	Transfer fee	Source
23	DF	(Czech Republic)	Matěj Chaluš	24	Slovan Liberec (Czech Republic)	Transfer	Winter	2025	Undisclosed	mff.se
39	DF	(Cameroon)	Samuel Kotto	18	APEJES Academy (Cameroon)	Transfer	Winter	2025	Undisclosed	mff.se
21	DF	(Bosnia and Herzegovina)	Dennis Hadžikadunić	23	Rostov (Russia)	Loan	Winter	2022		mff.se
9	FW	(Sweden)	Isaac Kiese Thelin	29	Baniyas (United Arab Emirates)	Transfer	Winter	2025	Undisclosed	mff.se
25	MF	(Mali)	Mahamé Siby	25	Strasbourg (France)	Transfer	Summer	2026	Undisclosed	mff.se
20	MF	(Sweden)	Moustafa Zeidan	24	IK Sirius	Transfer	Summer	2026	Undisclosed	mff.se
15	MF	(Sweden)	Joseph Ceesay	24	Lechia Gdańsk (Poland)	Transfer	Summer	2026	Undisclosed	mff.se
33	FW	(Sierra Leone)	Mohamed Buya Turay	27	Henan Songshan Longmen (China)	Transfer	Summer	2025	Undisclosed	mff.se
40	MF	(Ghana)	Emmanuel Lomotey	24	Amiens (France)	Transfer	Summer	2026	Undisclosed	mff.se

==== Out ====
No.	Pos.	Nat.	Name	Age	Moving to	Type	Transfer window	Transfer fee	Source
23	FW	(Sweden)	Marcus Antonsson	31	IFK Värnamo	End of contract	Winter		mff.se
38	DF	(Sweden)	Linus Borgström	21	Falkenbergs FF	End of contract	Winter		mff.se
31	DF	(Sweden)	Franz Brorsson	26	Aris Limassol (Cyprus)	End of contract	Winter		mff.se
16	GK	(Sweden)	Mathias Nilsson	22	Östers IF	Loan	Winter		mff.se
29	DF	(Sweden)	Noah Eile	19	Mjällby AIF	Loan	Winter		mff.se
20	MF	(Nigeria)	Bonke Innocent	28	Lorient (France)	End of contract	Winter		mff.se
1	GK	(Sweden)	Melker Ellborg	18	IFK Malmö	Loan	Winter		mff.se
	MF	(Sweden)	Melker Widell	19	BK Olympic	Loan	Winter		mff.se
	FW	(Sweden)	Samuel Burakovsky	19	BK Olympic	Loan	Winter		mff.se
	MF	(Sweden)	Hugo Bolin	18	BK Olympic	Loan	Winter		mff.se
	MF	(Sweden)	August Karlin	18	BK Olympic	Loan	Winter		mff.se
34	MF	(Sweden)	Markus Björkqvist	18	Utsiktens BK	Loan	Winter		mff.se
40	DF	(Sweden)	Hugo Andersson	23	Randers (Denmark)	Transfer	Winter	Undisclosed	mff.se
15	DF	(Bosnia and Herzegovina)	Anel Ahmedhodžić	22	Bordeaux (France)	Loan	Winter		mff.se
39	FW	(Sweden)	Amin Sarr	20	Heerenveen (Netherlands)	Transfer	Winter	(€2,300,000)	mff.se
21	MF	(Sweden)	Peter Gwargis	21	Jönköpings Södra	Loan	Winter		mff.se
25	MF	(Sweden)	Aleksander Damnjanovic Nilsson	19	Sandefjord (Norway)	Loan	Winter		mff.se
39	DF	(Cameroon)	Samuel Kotto	18	BK Olympic	Loan	Winter		mff.se
33	MF	(Sweden)	Amel Mujanić	21	APOEL (Cyprus)	Loan	Summer		mff.se
15	DF	(Bosnia and Herzegovina)	Anel Ahmedhodžić	23	Sheffield United (England)	Transfer	Summer	(€3,500,000)	mff.se
17	FW	(Ghana)	Malik Abubakari	22	HJK (Finland)	Loan	Summer		mff.se
37	MF	(Sweden)	Sebastian Nanasi	20	Kalmar FF	Loan	Summer		mff.se
25	MF	(Sweden)	Aleksander Damnjanovic Nilsson	19	Sandefjord (Norway)	Transfer	Summer	Undisclosed	mff.se
28	MF	(Sweden)	David Edvardsson	20	IFK Värnamo	Loan	Summer		mff.se
35	MF	(Sweden)	Samuel Adrian	24	Jönköpings Södra	Loan	Summer		mff.se
2	DF	(Sweden)	Eric Larsson	31	OFI (Greece)	Transfer	Summer	Undisclosed	mff.se
19	MF	(Serbia)	Veljko Birmančević	24	Toulouse (France)	Transfer	Summer	Undisclosed	mff.se

== Player statistics ==
=== Appearances and goals ===
As of 6 November 2022

Number	Position	Name	2022 Allsvenskan		2021–22 Svenska Cupen 2022–23 Svenska Cupen		2022–23 UEFA Champions League 2022–23 UEFA Europa League		Total	
Number	Position	Name	Appearances	Goals	Appearances	Goals	Appearances	Goals	Appearances	Goals
1	GK	Melker Ellborg	0	0	0	0	0	0	0	0
2	DF	Eric Larsson	13	0	6	1	5	0	24	1
3	DF	Jonas Knudsen	11	0	1	0	6	0	18	0
4	DF	Niklas Moisander	8	0	4	1	9	1	21	2
5	MF	Søren Rieks	15	2	5	0	5	0	25	2
6	MF	Oscar Lewicki	11	0	1	0	5	0	17	0
7	MF	Erdal Rakip	25	1	7	2	10	0	42	3
8	MF	Sergio Peña	19	1	6	0	11	0	36	1
9	FW	Isaac Kiese Thelin	23	12	3	2	13	3	39	17
10	MF	Anders Christiansen	20	2	4	2	12	2	36	6
11	FW	Ola Toivonen	25	6	2	0	10	3	37	9
13	DF	Martin Olsson	16	0	6	0	9	1	31	1
14	DF	Felix Beijmo	27	1	5	0	14	1	46	2
15	DF	Anel Ahmedhodžić	0	0	0	0	0	0	0	0
15	MF	Joseph Ceesay	10	0	0	0	8	1	18	1
16	GK	Mathias Nilsson	0	0	0	0	0	0	0	0
17	FW	Malik Abubakari	8	2	6	2	0	0	14	4
18	MF	Romain Gall	3	0	2	3	1	0	6	3
19	MF	Veljko Birmančević	18	5	6	6	7	4	31	15
20	MF	Moustafa Zeidan	15	3	0	0	8	1	23	4
21	DF	Dennis Hadžikadunić	25	1	2	0	11	0	38	1
21	MF	Peter Gwargis	0	0	0	0	0	0	0	0
22	MF	Adi Nalić	4	0	2	1	0	0	6	1
23	DF	Matěj Chaluš	10	0	5	0	2	0	17	0
24	DF	Lasse Nielsen	23	0	6	0	10	0	39	0
25	MF	Mahamé Siby	2	0	0	0	1	0	3	0
25	MF	Aleksander Damnjanovic Nilsson	0	0	0	0	0	0	0	0
26	MF	Mubaarak Nuh	0	0	0	0	0	0	0	0
27	GK	Johan Dahlin	19	0	5	0	9	0	33	0
28	MF	David Edvardsson	0	0	0	0	0	0	0	0
29	DF	Noah Eile	0	0	0	0	0	0	0	0
30	GK	Ismael Diawara	14	0	1	0	5	0	20	0
31	MF	Hugo Larsson	27	1	6	0	13	0	46	1
32	MF	Jo Inge Berget	22	2	6	1	11	0	39	3
33	FW	Mohamed Buya Turay	10	1	1	0	5	1	16	2
34	MF	Markus Björkqvist	0	0	0	0	0	0	0	0
35	MF	Samuel Adrian	1	0	0	0	0	0	1	0
36	MF	Patriot Sejdiu	19	4	3	3	4	1	26	8
37	MF	Sebastian Nanasi	9	0	4	1	1	0	14	1
40	MF	Emmanuel Lomotey	3	0	1	0	2	0	6	0
41	MF	Mamadou Diagne	0	0	1	0	0	0	1	0
42	DF	André Alvarez Perez	0	0	1	0	0	0	1	0
44	MF	Raymond Adjei	0	0	1	0	0	0	1	0

== Competitions ==
=== Allsvenskan ===
==== League table ====
Pos	Team	Pld	W	D	L	GF	GA	GD	Pts
5	AIK	30	14	8	8	45	36	+9	50
6	IF Elfsborg	30	13	10	7	55	35	+20	49
7	Malmö FF	30	13	7	10	44	34	+10	46
8	IFK Göteborg	30	14	3	13	42	39	+3	45
9	Mjällby AIF	30	11	10	9	33	33	0	43

Source: svenskfotboll.se (in Swedish)
Rules for classification: 1) Points; 2) Goal difference; 3) Goals scored; 4) Head-to-head points; 5) Head-to-head goal difference; 6) Head-to-head away goals scored; 7) Play-off
(Note: Play-off is only played if need to decide champion, teams for relegation or UEFA competition and will be played on a neutral ground).

==== Results summary ====
Overall								Home						Away					
Pld	W	D	L	GF	GA	GD	Pts	W	D	L	GF	GA	GD	W	D	L	GF	GA	GD
30	13	7	10	44	34	+10	46	8	4	3	25	13	+12	5	3	7	19	21	−2

Source: svenskfotboll.se (in Swedish)

==== Results by round ====
Round	1	2	3	4	5	6	7	8	9	10	11	12	13	14	15	16	17	18	19	20	21	22	23	24	25	26	27	28	29	30
Ground	A	H	H	A	H	A	H	A	H	A	H	A	H	A	H	A	A	H	A	H	A	H	A	H	H	A	H	A	A	H
Result	W	D	W	D	W	D	W	L	L	W	W	L	W	W	W	L	L	W	D	L	L	W	W	D	D	L	L	L	W	D
Position	7	6	3	4	2	3	2	4	5	4	3	4	4	4	4	5	6	4	5	5	7	5	4	4	6	6	6	7	7	7

Source: see below
A = Away; H = Home; W = Win; D = Draw; L = Loss

==== Matches ====
3 April 2022 Matchday 1	Kalmar FF	0–1	Malmö FF	Kalmar
17:30		Report	Kiese Thelin 76'	Stadium: Guldfågeln Arena; Referee: Glenn Nyberg

11 April 2022 Matchday 2	Malmö FF	1–1	IF Elfsborg	Malmö
19:10	Birmančević 39'	Report	Olsson 50'	Stadium: Eleda Stadion; Attendance: 19,405; Referee: Fredrik Klitte

17 April 2022 Matchday 3	Malmö FF	3–0	AIK	Malmö
15:00	Kiese Thelin 3', 79'; Toivonen 45+7'	Report		Stadium: Eleda Stadion; Attendance: 20,122; Referee: Mohammed Al-Hakim

21 April 2022 Matchday 4	IFK Värnamo	0–0	Malmö FF	Värnamo
19:00		Report		Stadium: Finnvedsvallen; Attendance: 4,930; Referee: Victor Wolf

25 April 2022 Matchday 5	Malmö FF	1–0	IFK Göteborg	Malmö
19:10	Christiansen 48' (pen.)	Report		Stadium: Eleda Stadion; Attendance: 19,785; Referee: Andreas Ekberg

2 May 2022 Matchday 6	Hammarby IF	0–0	Malmö FF	Stockholm
19:10		Report		Stadium: Tele2 Arena; Attendance: 29,696; Referee: Glenn Nyberg

7 May 2022 Matchday 7	Malmö FF	2–0	Mjällby AIF	Malmö
17:30	Abubakari 36'; Birmančević 38'	Report		Stadium: Eleda Stadion; Attendance: 19,812; Referee: Bojan Pandžić

11 May 2022 Matchday 16	AIK	2–0	Malmö FF	Solna
19:00	17' (o.g.); Larsson 87' (pen.)	Report		Stadium: Friends Arena; Attendance: 25,153; Referee: Adam Ladebäck

16 May 2022 Matchday 8	Djurgårdens IF	4–0	Malmö FF	Stockholm
19:10	15' (o.g.); Ekdal 33'; Hien 65'; Asoro 73'	Report		Stadium: Tele2 Arena; Attendance: 20,550; Referee: Mohammed Al-Hakim

22 May 2022 Matchday 9	Malmö FF	1–2	BK Häcken	Malmö
17:30	Abubakari 77'	Report	Jeremejeff 52'; Berggren 61'	Stadium: Eleda Stadion; Attendance: 18,519; Referee: Fredrik Klitte

29 May 2022 Matchday 10	Degerfors IF	0–2	Malmö FF	Degerfors
15:00		Report	Toivonen 4', 44'	Stadium: Stora Valla; Attendance: 2,801; Referee: Victor Wolf

27 June 2022 Matchday 11	Malmö FF	2–1	Helsingborgs IF	Malmö
19:10	Kiese Thelin 24'; Sejdiu 90+1'	Report	Olsson 37'	Stadium: Eleda Stadion; Attendance: 20,231; Referee: Glenn Nyberg

1 July 2022 Matchday 12	GIF Sundsvall	2–1	Malmö FF	Sundsvall
19:00	Damus 14'; Stensson 31'	Report	Peña 7'	Stadium: NP3 Arena; Attendance: 3,251; Referee: Victor Wolf

9 July 2022 Matchday 13	Malmö FF	3–0	Varbergs BoIS	Malmö
15:00	Berget 45+6' (pen.); Christiansen 64'; Birmančević 87'	Report		Stadium: Eleda Stadion; Attendance: 15,427; Referee: Kristoffer Karlsson

16 July 2022 Matchday 14	IFK Norrköping	0–2	Malmö FF	Norrköping
15:00		Report	Zeidan 10'; Kiese Thelin 57'	Stadium: PlatinumCars Arena; Attendance: 10,207; Referee: Mohammed Al-Hakim

23 July 2022 Matchday 15	Malmö FF	3–1	IK Sirius	Malmö
15:00	Sejdiu 33', 89'; Zeidan 52'	Report	Rogić 87' (pen.)	Stadium: Eleda Stadion; Attendance: 16,952; Referee: Granit Maqedonci

7 August 2022 Matchday 17	IK Sirius	2–1	Malmö FF	Uppsala
15:00	Mathisen 45'; Kouakou 57'	Report	Berget 18'	Stadium: Studenternas IP; Attendance: 5,132; Referee: Bojan Pandžić

14 August 2022 Matchday 18	Malmö FF	3–1	GIF Sundsvall	Malmö
15:00	Birmančević 39'; Kiese Thelin 44', 45+2'	Report	Ylätupa 68'	Stadium: Eleda Stadion; Attendance: 14,205; Referee: Adam Ladebäck

21 August 2022 Matchday 19	Mjällby AIF	1–1	Malmö FF	Hällevik
15:00	Gustafson 58'	Report	Birmančević 62'	Stadium: Strandvallen; Attendance: 6,000; Referee: Fredrik Klitte

28 August 2022 Matchday 20	Malmö FF	0–1	Kalmar FF	Malmö
17:30		Report	90+2' (o.g.)	Stadium: Eleda Stadion; Attendance: 17,052; Referee: Mohammed Al-Hakim

4 September 2022 Matchday 21	IF Elfsborg	3–2	Malmö FF	Borås
17:30	Baidoo 11', 73'; Rømer 79'	Report	Kiese Thelin 42', 65'	Stadium: Borås Arena; Attendance: 7,532; Referee: Victor Wolf

11 September 2022 Matchday 22	Malmö FF	2–1	IFK Norrköping	Malmö
17:30	Zeidan 70'; Kiese Thelin 73'	Report	Ortmark 3'	Stadium: Eleda Stadion; Attendance: 14,751; Referee: Bojan Pandžić

18 September 2022 Matchday 23	Helsingborgs IF	1–2	Malmö FF	Helsingborg
15:00	Muhsin 44'	Report	Sejdiu 17'; Hadžikadunić 63'	Stadium: Olympia; Attendance: 15,800; Referee: Mohammed Al-Hakim

1 October 2022 Matchday 24	Malmö FF	0–0	Hammarby IF	Malmö
15:00		Report		Stadium: Eleda Stadion; Attendance: 19,712; Referee: Glenn Nyberg

9 October 2022 Matchday 25	Malmö FF	0–0	IFK Värnamo	Malmö
15:00		Report		Stadium: Eleda Stadion; Attendance: 15,168; Referee: Andreas Ekberg

17 October 2022 Matchday 26	IFK Göteborg	2–1	Malmö FF	Gothenburg
19:10	Norlin 70'; Johansson 83'	Report	Kiese Thelin 46'	Stadium: Gamla Ullevi; Attendance: 14,011; Referee: Mohammed Al-Hakim

20 October 2022 Matchday 27	Malmö FF	2–3	Djurgårdens IF	Malmö
19:00	Rakip 5'; Rieks 26'	Report	Andersson 52'; Holmberg 62'; Danielsson 90+2' (pen.)	Stadium: Eleda Stadion; Attendance: 16,703; Referee: Fredrik Klitte

23 October 2022 Matchday 28	BK Häcken	2–1	Malmö FF	Gothenburg
17:30	Olden Larsen 1'; Gustafson 73'	Report	Beijmo 85'	Stadium: Bravida Arena; Attendance: 6,053; Referee: Kristoffer Karlsson

30 October 2022 Matchday 29	Varbergs BoIS	2–5	Malmö FF	Varberg
17:30	Birkfeldt 54'; Simović 73'	Report	Toivonen 44', 52', 55'; Rieks 64'; Buya Turay 88'	Stadium: Påskbergsvallen; Attendance: 2,724; Referee: Joakim Östling

6 November 2022 Matchday 30	Malmö FF	2–2	Degerfors IF	Malmö
15:00	Larsson 18'; Kiese Thelin 61'	Report	Faraj 37'; Örqvist 64'	Stadium: Eleda Stadion; Attendance: 13,312; Referee: Andreas Ekberg

=== Svenska Cupen ===
Kickoff times are in UTC+1 unless stated otherwise.

==== 2021–22 ====
The tournament continued from the 2021 season.

===== Group stage =====
Pos	Team	Pld	W	D	L	GF	GA	GD	Pts	Qualification
1	Malmö FF	3	3	0	0	12	2	+10	9	Advance to Knockout Stage
2	IFK Värnamo	3	2	0	1	3	3	0	6	
3	GAIS	3	1	0	2	2	6	−4	3	
4	Ängelholms FF	3	0	0	3	2	8	−6	0	

Updated to match(es) played on unknown. Source: Swedish Football Association
Rules for classification: 1) Points; 2) Goal difference; 3) Goals scored; 4) Head-to-head record; 5) Lowest disciplinary points; 6) Highest ranked team

19 February 2022 Matchday 1	Malmö FF	5–1	GAIS	Malmö
15:15	Birmančević 9', 12', 16'; Christiansen 38'; Abubakari 83'	Report	Lundgren 34'	Stadium: Malmö IP; Attendance: 3300; Referee: Fredrik Klitte

26 February 2022 Matchday 2	Ängelholms FF	1–5	Malmö FF	Ängelholm
15:15	Oremo 29'	Report	Nalić 43'; Birmančević 63'; Abubakari 80'; Larsson 84'; Christiansen 90+3'	Stadium: Fridhemsparken; Referee: Kaspar Sjöberg

5 March 2022 Matchday 3	Malmö FF	2–0	IFK Värnamo	Malmö
17:30	Birmančević 25'; Berget 36'	Report		Stadium: Malmö IP; Referee: Kristoffer Karlsson

===== Knockout stage =====
14 March 2022 Quarter-final	Malmö FF	3–2 (a.e.t.)	AIK	Malmö
19:00	Nanasi 57'; Moisander 72'; Birmančević 105' (pen.)	Report	Bahoui 51', 75'	Stadium: Malmö IP; Attendance: 3,290; Referee: Adam Ladebäck

20 March 2022 Semi-final	Djurgårdens IF	0–1	Malmö FF	Stockholm
14:00		Report	Kiese Thelin 33'	Stadium: Tele2 Arena; Attendance: 16,511; Referee: Mohammed Al-Hakim

26 May 2022 Final	Hammarby IF	0–0 (a.e.t.) (3–4 p)	Malmö FF	Stockholm
15:00		Report		Stadium: Tele2 Arena; Attendance: 29,214; Referee: Andreas Ekberg
	Penalties
	Besara (penalty missed); Fenger (penalty scored); Trawally (penalty scored); Khalili (penalty scored); Selmani (penalty missed)		(penalty missed) Peña; (penalty scored) Birmančević; (penalty scored) Berget; (penalty scored) Olsson; (penalty scored) Toivonen

==== 2022–23 ====
===== Qualification stage =====
31 August 2022 Round 2	Brålanda IF	0–9	Malmö FF	Brålanda
18:00		Report	Sejdiu 2', 10', 73'; Kiese 8'; Gall 19', 49', 82'; Rakip 40', 64'	Stadium: Sörbyvallen; Attendance: 1,987; Referee: Richard Sundell

=== UEFA Champions League ===
Kickoff times are in UTC+2 unless stated otherwise.

==== Qualifying phase and play-off round ====
===== First qualifying round =====
5 July 2022 First Leg	Malmö FF (Sweden)	3–2	(Iceland) Víkingur Reykjavík	Malmö, Sweden
19:00	Olsson 16'; Toivonen 42'; Birmančević 84'	Report	Ingason 38'; Gudjónsson 90+3'	Stadium: Eleda Stadion; Attendance: 11,830; Referee: Dumitri Muntean (Moldova)

12 July 2022 Second Leg	Víkingur Reykjavík (Iceland)	3–3 (5–6 agg.)	(Sweden) Malmö FF	Reykjavík, Iceland
21:30 (19:30 WET)	Gunnarsson 15', 75'; Hansen 56'	Report	Birmančević 34'; Beijmo 44'; Christiansen 47'	Stadium: Víkingsvöllur; Attendance: 1,080; Referee: John Beaton (Scotland)

===== Second qualifying round =====
19 July 2022 First Leg	Žalgiris Vilnius (Lithuania)	1–0	(Sweden) Malmö FF	Vilnius, Lithuania
18:00 (19:00 EEST)	Ourega 49'	Report		Stadium: LFF Stadium; Attendance: 4,918; Referee: Georgi Kabakov (Bulgaria)

27 July 2022 Second Leg	Malmö FF (Sweden)	0–2 (0–3 agg.)	(Lithuania) Žalgiris Vilnius	Malmö, Sweden
19:00		Report	Oyewusi 34'; Oliveira 52'	Stadium: Eleda Stadion; Attendance: 17,234; Referee: Kristo Tohver (Estonia)

=== UEFA Europa League ===
Kickoff times are in UTC+2 unless stated otherwise.

==== Qualifying phase and play-off round ====
===== Third qualifying round =====
4 August 2022 First Leg	Malmö FF (Sweden)	3–0	(Luxembourg) F91 Dudelange	Malmö, Sweden
19:00	Kiese Thelin 54'; Toivonen 81'; Birmančević 85'	Report		Stadium: Eleda Stadion; Attendance: 11,172; Referee: Enea Jorgji (Albania)

11 August 2022 Second Leg	F91 Dudelange (Luxembourg)	2–2 (2–5 agg.)	(Sweden) Malmö FF	Luxembourg City, Luxembourg
20:00	Hadji 56'; Sinani 61'	Report	Buya Turay 50'; Toivonen 52'	Stadium: Stade de Luxembourg; Attendance: 898; Referee: Ricardo de Burgos Bengoetxea (Spain)

===== Play-off round =====
18 August 2022 First Leg	Malmö FF (Sweden)	3–1	(Turkey) Sivasspor	Malmö, Sweden
19:00	Zeidan 18'; Christiansen 37'; Moisander 68'	Report	James 30'	Stadium: Eleda Stadion; Attendance: 12,176; Referee: Willie Collum (Scotland)

25 August 2022 Second Leg	Sivasspor (Turkey)	0–2 (1–5 agg.)	(Sweden) Malmö FF	Sivas, Turkey
19:00 (20:00 TRT)		Report	Birmančević 76'; Kiese Thelin 90'	Stadium: New Sivas 4 Eylül Stadium; Attendance: 16,873; Referee: Srđan Jovanović (Serbia)

==== Group stage ====
The draw for the group stage was held on 26 August 2022.

Pos	Team	Pld	W	D	L	GF	GA	GD	Pts	Qualification	USG	UBE	BRA	MAL
1	(Belgium) Union Saint-Gilloise	6	4	1	1	11	7	+4	13	Advance to round of 16	—	0–1	3–3	3–2
2	(Germany) Union Berlin	6	4	0	2	4	2	+2	12	Advance to knockout round play-offs	0–1	—	1–0	1–0
3	(Portugal) Braga	6	3	1	2	9	7	+2	10	Transfer to Europa Conference League	1–2	1–0	—	2–1
4	(Sweden) Malmö FF	6	0	0	6	3	11	−8	0		0–2	0–1	0–2	—

Source: UEFA
Rules for classification: Group stage tiebreakers

8 September 2022 Matchday 1	Malmö FF (Sweden)	0–2	(Portugal) Braga	Malmö, Sweden
18:45		Report	Rodrigues 30'; Horta 70' (pen.)	Stadium: Eleda Stadion; Attendance: 13,721; Referee: Duje Strukan (Croatia)

15 September 2022 Matchday 2	Union Saint-Gilloise (Belgium)	3–2	(Sweden) Malmö FF	Leuven, Belgium
21:00	Burgess 17'; Teuma 69'; Boniface 71'	Report	Ceesay 6'; Kiese Thelin 57'	Stadium: Den Dreef; Attendance: 4,373; Referee: Bartosz Frankowski (Poland)

6 October 2022 Matchday 3	Malmö FF (Sweden)	0–1	(Germany) Union Berlin	Malmö, Sweden
18:45		Report	Becker 68'	Stadium: Eleda Stadion; Attendance: 16,057; Referee: Halil Umut Meler (Turkey)

13 October 2022 Matchday 4	Union Berlin (Germany)	1–0	(Sweden) Malmö FF	Berlin, Germany
21:00	Knoche 89' (pen.)	Report		Stadium: Stadion An der Alten Försterei; Attendance: 21,800; Referee: Aleksandar Stavrev (North Macedonia)

27 October 2022 Matchday 5	Malmö FF (Sweden)	0–2	(Belgium) Union Saint-Gilloise	Malmö, Sweden
18:45		Report	Teuma 10'; Lazare Amani 42'	Stadium: Eleda Stadion; Attendance: 10,912; Referee: Roi Reinshreiber (Israel)

3 November 2022 Matchday 6	Braga (Portugal)	2–1	(Sweden) Malmö FF	Braga, Portugal
21:00 (20:00 WET)	Horta 36'; Djaló 55'	Report	Sejdiu 77'	Stadium: Estádio Municipal; Attendance: 11,805; Referee: Ruddy Buquet (France)

== Non-competitive ==
=== Pre-season ===
Kickoff times are in UTC+1 unless stated otherwise.

28 January 2022	Malmö FF	2–2	Jammerbugt FC	Malmö
15:30	Berget 29'; Sejdiu 31'	Report	Pimentel 73'; Gavranovic 79'	Stadium: Malmö IP

4 February 2022	Malmö FF	1–1	Lokomotiv Moscow	Marbella
16:00	Sejdiu 54'	Report	Kuchta 36'	Stadium: Marbella Football Center

12 February 2022	Malmö FF	0–2	FC Krasnodar	Marbella
11:00		Report	Ramírez 36'; Wanderson 58'	Stadium: Marbella Football Center

27 February 2022	Malmö FF	2–0	BK Olympic	Malmö
13:00	Nanasi 40', 87'	Report		Stadium: Limhamns IP

=== Mid-season ===
Kickoff times are in UTC+2 unless stated otherwise.

20 June 2022	Malmö FF	2–0	Trelleborgs FF	Malmö
18:00	Sejdiu 31'; Berget 75' (pen.)	Report		Stadium: Eleda Stadion; Referee: Tess Olofsson
