= Anders Christiansen =

Danish footballer (born 1990)

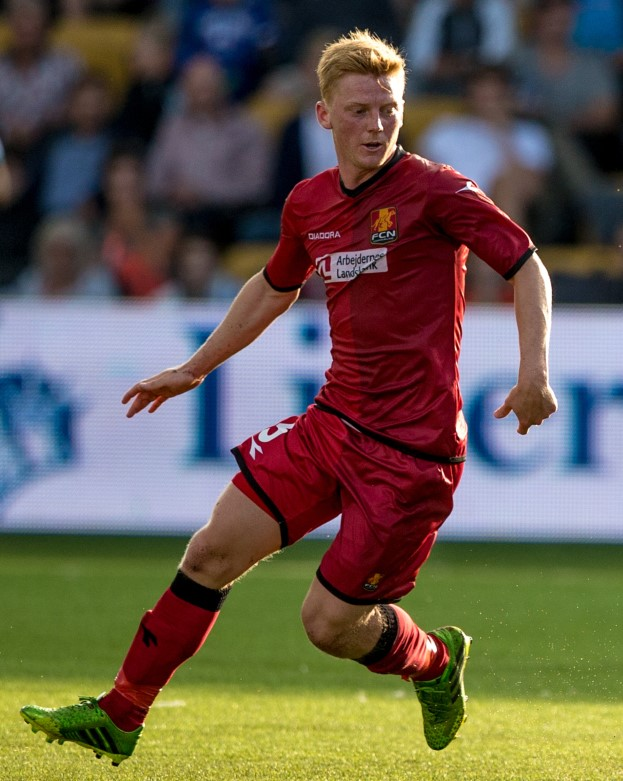
- Christiansen playing for FC Nordsjælland

Personal information
- Full name: Anders Bleg Christiansen
- Date of birth: 8 June 1990 (age 36)
- Place of birth: Copenhagen, Denmark
- Height: 1.74 m (5 ft 9 in)
- Position: Midfielder

Team information
- Current team: Malmö FF
- Number: 10

Youth career
- Lyngby

Senior career*
| Years | Team | Apps | (Gls) |
| 2008–2012 | Lyngby | 80 | (6) |
| 2012–2015 | Nordsjælland | 67 | (5) |
| 2015–2016 | Chievo | 4 | (0) |
| 2016–2017 | Malmö FF | 49 | (11) |
| 2018 | Gent | 4 | (0) |
| 2018– | Malmö FF | 148 | (42) |

International career
| 2008 | Denmark U18 | 1 | (0) |
| 2008–2009 | Denmark U19 | 9 | (0) |
| 2010 | Denmark U20 | 3 | (1) |
| 2011–2012 | Denmark U21 | 10 | (3) |
| 2013 | Denmark League XI | 1 | (0) |
| 2014–2021 | Denmark | 5 | (0) |
- * Club domestic league appearances and goals as of 16 August 2026

Anders Bleg Christiansen (born 8 June 1990) is a Danish professional footballer who plays as a midfielder for and captains Allsvenskan club Malmö FF.

Having played for Denmark across various youth levels, he made his full senior debut in 2014, and won five caps for the national team until 2021. He was also a part of the Denmark squad that participated in the UEFA Euro 2020.

== Club career ==
=== Lyngby BK ===
Christiansen started his senior career at Lyngby BK. He made his debut in the 2008–09 season, making three league appearances. The following season, Christiansen earned more playing time and helped Lyngby achieve promotion to the top flight. He excelled as one of Lyngby's key players in the Superliga for the following two seasons, but could not save the team from relegation in their second season.

=== FC Nordsjælland ===
Christiansen's play in the Superliga earned him attention from the reigning champions FC Nordsjælland. On 25 July 2012, Christiansen was presented as a Nordsjælland player after signing a four-year contract. He made 67 league appearances for the club during his two and a half year stint, and appeared in five games in the 2012–13 UEFA Champions League group stage.

=== Chievo Verona ===
On 15 January 2015, Christiansen secured a transfer to Serie A club Chievo. During his year in Italy, he struggled for game time, appearing in just four league matches and a single appearance in the Coppa Italia.

=== Malmö FF ===
On 26 January 2016, Christiansen was presented as Allan Kuhn's first signing as the newly appointed head coach at Malmö FF. He made his Allsvenskan debut in the season opener against reigning champions IFK Norrköping, where he scored his first goal for the club in a 3–1 win. Christiansen scored five more goals during the 2016 season and played a key role in Malmö's championship winning team until he suffered a season-ending injury with seven games to play. He recovered just in time for the start of the 2017 season, and soon picked up where he left off before the injury. On 7 September 2017, it was announced that Christiansen had extended his contract with Malmö FF over the 2022 season. On 16 October 2017, Christiansen scored a goal and added two assists in Malmö FF's 3–1 victory over IFK Norrköping, which secured the league title with three games to play. After the season, Christiansen was voted Allsvenskan's midfielder of the year and the league's most valuable player. and also in 2020.

=== Gent ===
On 4 January 2018, he joined Belgian side Gent.

=== Return to Malmö FF ===
After a six-month spell at Gent, Christiansen rejoined Malmö FF in July 2018. He was appointed club captain ahead of the 2020 season after predecessor Markus Rosenberg retired. Under Christiansen's captaincy, Malmö won the 2020 championship and followed it up by qualifying for the 2021–22 UEFA Champions League group stage.

In May 2023, Christiansen had to step away from training due to dizziness. It was later confirmed that the midfielder had to undergo an operation to have a pacemaker fitted and would consequently miss the rest of the season. During his absence, the captaincy was shared by teammates Lasse Nielsen and later Pontus Jansson following the former's move to Göztepe S.K. On 24 January 2024, Malmö FF confirmed Christiansen to once again be available and he played the first 30 minutes in a 2–0 victory against Silkeborg IF, furthermore providing an assist for Stefano Vecchia's goal. On 28 April 2024, Christiansen made his first competitive appearance in 11 months. Christiansen came on as a substitute for teammate Isaac Kiese Thelin in the 77th minute in a 5–0 victory against AIK.

== International career ==
Christiansen has represented the Denmark national team in three friendlies. After a successful spring in Malmö he got called up by former Malmö coach Åge Hareide in May 2016, but had to decline after suffering a thigh injury. He was included in the 26-man squad for the UEFA Euro 2020 tournament by Denmark coach Kasper Hjulmand.

== Personal life ==
Due to the moderate mutual intelligibility between Danish and Swedish, Christiansen speaks a less dialectal version of his native language to the Swedish press as Malmö captain. He became fully comfortable with comprehending Swedish speech after several years in the country. This caused reactions when the Swedish broadcaster began an interview with him in English in 2020, only for Christiansen to respond that he preferred to do a cross-lingual interview instead.

Christiansen grew up as a supporter of English club Liverpool. During his professional career he has admitted it became a 'bit more distant'.

== Career statistics ==
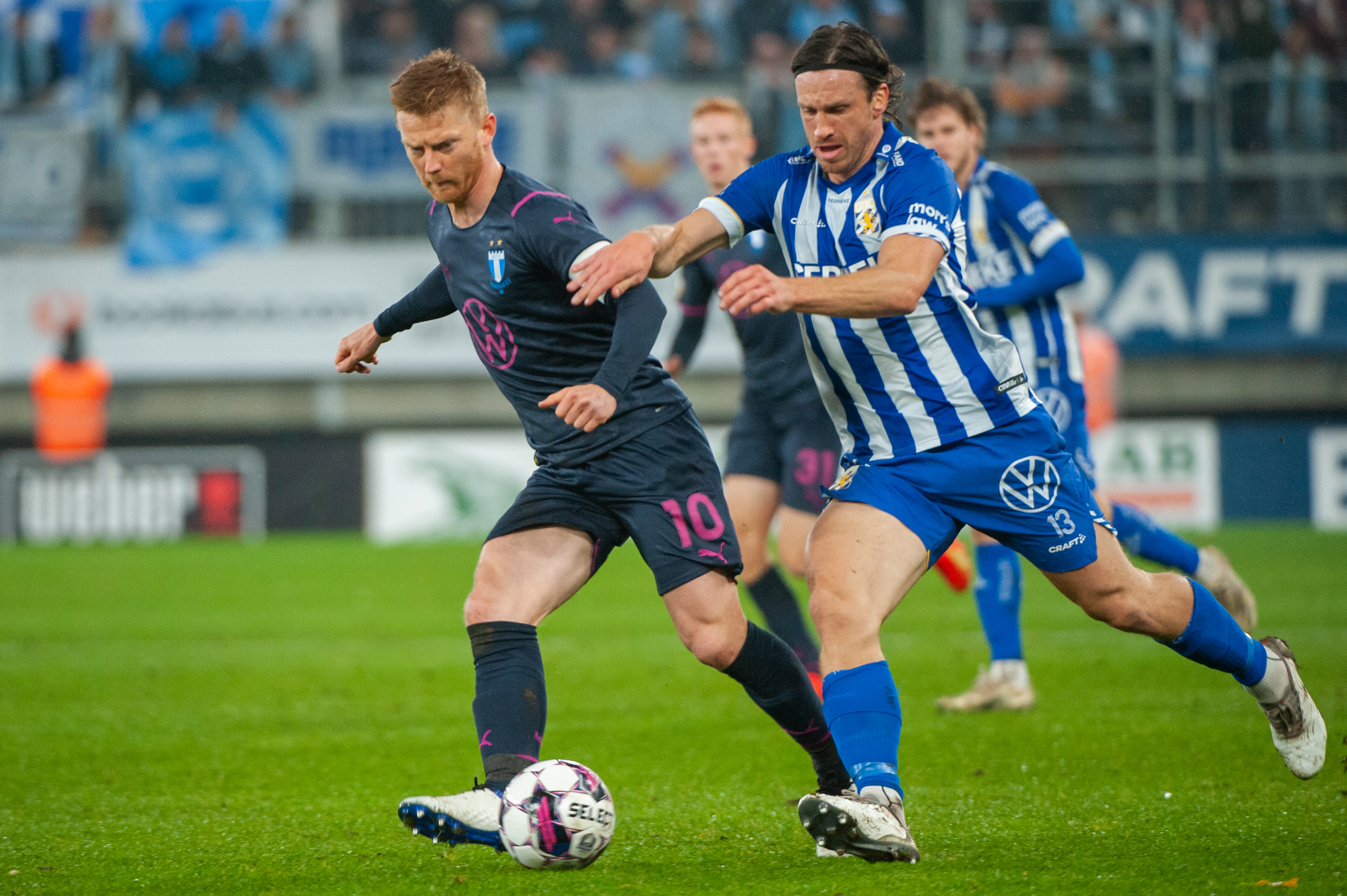
Christiansen playing for Malmö FF in 2022

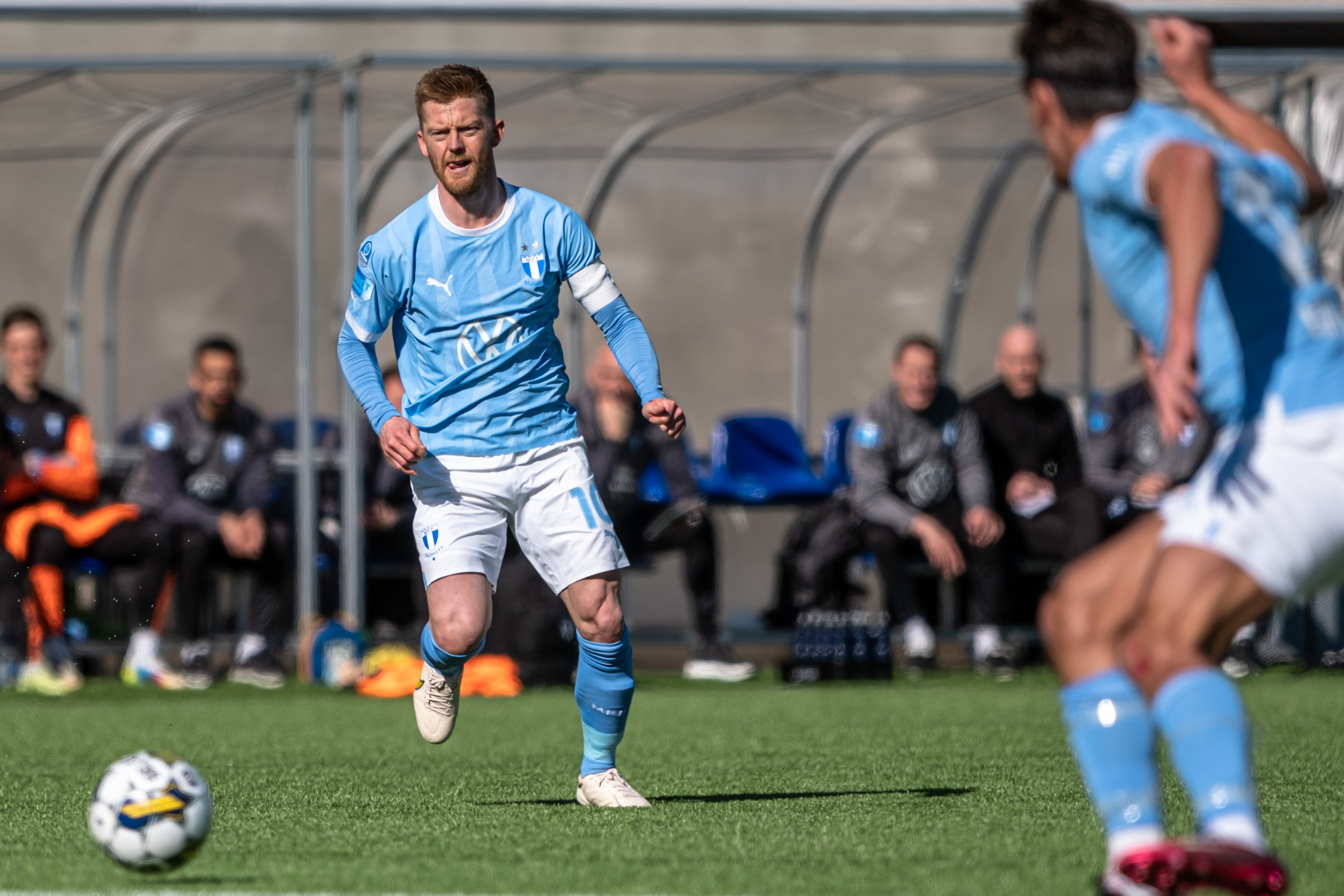
Christiansen playing for Malmö FF in 2023

=== Club ===
As of match played 16 August 2026

Appearances and goals by club, season and competition
| Club | Season | League | | | Cup | | Continental | | Total | |
| Club | Season | Division | Apps | Goals | Apps | Goals | Apps | Goals | Apps | Goals |
|---|---|---|---|---|---|---|---|---|---|---|
| Lyngby BK | 2008–09 | 1. Division | 3 | 0 | 1 | 0 | — | | 4 | 0 |
| Lyngby BK | 2009–10 | 1. Division | 17 | 2 | 2 | 1 | — | | 19 | 3 |
| Lyngby BK | 2010–11 | Superligaen | 32 | 1 | 1 | 0 | — | | 33 | 1 |
| Lyngby BK | 2011–12 | Superligaen | 28 | 3 | 0 | 0 | — | | 28 | 3 |
| Lyngby BK | Total | | 80 | 6 | 4 | 1 | 0 | 0 | 84 | 7 |
| FC Nordsjælland | 2012–13 | Superligaen | 22 | 3 | 2 | 1 | 5 (Note: Appearances in the Champions League) | 0 | 29 | 4 |
| FC Nordsjælland | 2013–14 | Superligaen | 30 | 2 | 5 | 1 | 4 (Note: Two appearances in the Champions League and two in the Europa League) | 0 | 39 | 3 |
| FC Nordsjælland | 2014–15 | Superligaen | 15 | 0 | 0 | 0 | — | | 15 | 0 |
| FC Nordsjælland | Total | | 67 | 5 | 7 | 2 | 9 | 0 | 83 | 7 |
| ChievoVerona | 2014–15 | Serie A | 4 | 0 | 0 | 0 | — | | 4 | 0 |
| ChievoVerona | 2015–16 | Serie A | 0 | 0 | 1 | 0 | — | | 1 | 0 |
| ChievoVerona | Total | | 4 | 0 | 1 | 0 | 0 | 0 | 5 | 0 |
| Malmö FF | 2016 | Allsvenskan | 22 | 6 | 7 | 1 | — | | 29 | 7 |
| Malmö FF | 2017 | Allsvenskan | 27 | 5 | 1 | 0 | 2 | 0 | 30 | 5 |
| Malmö FF | Total | | 49 | 11 | 8 | 1 | 2 | 0 | 59 | 12 |
| Gent | 2017–18 | First Division A | 4 | 0 | — | | — | | 4 | 0 |
| Malmö FF | 2018 | Allsvenskan | 15 | 2 | 1 | 0 | 12 (Note: Four appearances in the Champions League and eight in the Europa League) | 1 | 28 | 3 |
| Malmö FF | 2019 | Allsvenskan | 24 | 9 | 3 | 1 | 11 (Note: Appearances in the UEFA Europa League) | 2 | 38 | 12 |
| Malmö FF | 2020 | Allsvenskan | 23 | 13 | 3 | 4 | 3 | 0 | 29 | 17 |
| Malmö FF | 2021 | Allsvenskan | 22 | 6 | 3 | 1 | 11 | 2 | 36 | 9 |
| Malmö FF | 2022 | Allsvenskan | 20 | 2 | 4 | 2 | 12 | 2 | 36 | 6 |
| Malmö FF | 2023 | Allsvenskan | 8 | 1 | 2 | 2 | — | | 10 | 3 |
| Malmö FF | 2024 | Allsvenskan | 19 | 5 | 1 | 0 | 11 (Note: Five appearances and two goals in UEFA Champions League, six appearances in UEFA Europa League) | 2 | 31 | 7 |
| Malmö FF | 2025 | Allsvenskan | 14 | 4 | 6 | 1 | 7 | 2 | 31 | 7 |
| Malmö FF | 2026 | Allsvenskan | 3 | 0 | 3 | 2 | 2 (Note: Appearances in UEFA Europa League) | 0 | 8 | 2 |
| Malmö FF | Total | | 134 | 38 | 26 | 13 | 65 | 9 | 222 | 60 |
| Career total | | | 338 | 60 | 46 | 17 | 73 | 9 | 457 | 86 |

=== International ===
As of 6 March 2026

Appearances and goals by national team and year
| National team | Year | Apps | Goals |
|---|---|---|---|
| Denmark | 2014 | 1 | 0 |
| Denmark | 2015 | 2 | 0 |
| Denmark | 2016 | 0 | 0 |
| Denmark | 2017 | 0 | 0 |
| Denmark | 2018 | 0 | 0 |
| Denmark | 2019 | 0 | 0 |
| Denmark | 2020 | 0 | 0 |
| Denmark | 2021 | 2 | 0 |
| Total | | 5 | 0 |

== Honours ==
Malmö FF

- Allsvenskan: 2016, 2017, 2020, 2021, 2023, 2024
- Svenska Cupen: 2021–22, 2023–24

Individual

- Allsvenskan Midfielder of the Year: 2017, 2019, 2020
- Allsvenskan Player of the Year: 2017, 2020
