= Markus Björkqvist =

Swedish footballer

Personal information
- Full name: Markus Johan Björkqvist
- Date of birth: 4 September 2003 (age 23)
- Place of birth: Malmö, Sweden
- Height: 1.81 m (5 ft 11 in)
- Position: Midfielder

Team information
- Current team: AFC Malmö (on loan from Landskrona BoIS)
- Number: 11

Youth career
- –2013: Bara GIF
- 2013–2015: Malmö FF
- 2015–2017: Husie IF
- 2017–2021: Malmö FF

Senior career*
Years	Team	Apps	(Gls)
2021–2022	Malmö FF	4	(0)
2022	→ Utsikten (loan)	25	(2)
2023–2024	Trelleborg	35	(0)
2025–	Landskrona BoIS	31	(4)
2026–	→ AFC Malmö (loan)	10	(4)

International career
2019–2020	Sweden U17	13	(0)
2021–2022	Sweden U19	9	(1)
- * Club domestic league appearances and goals as of 16 November 2026

Markus Johan Björkqvist (born 4 September 2003) is a Swedish professional football player who plays for AFC Malmö, on loan from Landskrona BoIS.

== Club career ==
Björkqvist started playing football at Bara GIF, before joining Malmö FF aged eleven.

After signing his first contract with the Swedish champions in June 2021, Björkqvist made his professional debut for the club on the following 24 July, coming on as substitute in 2-0 away Allsvenskan win against Mjällby.

== Honours ==
Malmö FF

- Allsvenskan: 2021
