= Mathias Nilsson (footballer, born 1999) =

Swedish footballer (born 1999)

Personal information
- Full name: Mathias Alexander Nilsson
- Date of birth: 23 February 1999 (age 27)
- Place of birth: Vellinge, Sweden
- Height: 1.99 m (6 ft 6 in)
- Position: Goalkeeper

Team information
- Current team: Örgryte
- Number: 30

Youth career
- –2012: Vellinge
- 2012–2017: Malmö FF

Senior career*
Years	Team	Apps	(Gls)
2017–2024	Malmö FF	0	(0)
2019	→ Eskilsminne (loan)	5	(0)
2020	→ Lunds BK (loan)	15	(0)
2021–2022	→ Öster (loan)	46	(0)
2023	→ Örgryte (loan)	32	(0)
2024	→ Gnistan (loan)	7	(0)
2024	Gefle	11	(0)
2025	Trelleborg	19	(0)
2026–	Örgryte	0	(0)

International career
2016	Sweden U17	1	(0)
2017	Sweden U18	1	(0)
2017	Sweden U19	2	(0)
- * Club domestic league appearances and goals as of 9 July 2026

Mathias Alexander Nilsson (born 23 February 1999) is a Swedish professional football player who plays as a goalkeeper for Allsvenskan side Örgryte.

== Club career ==
On 15 February 2024, Nilsson moved to Finland after signing a loan deal with a newly promoted Veikkausliiga club IF Gnistan for the 2024 season. On 8 August 2024, his loan deal with Gnistan was terminated and he joined Gefle in Superettan.

== Career statistics ==
As of 9 July 2026.

Appearances and goals by club, season and competition
Club	Season	League			Cup (Note: Includes Svenska Cupen)		Other		Total	
Club	Season	Division	Apps	Goals	Apps	Goals	Apps	Goals	Apps	Goals
Malmö FF	2017	Allsvenskan	0	0	0	0	0	0	0	0
Malmö FF	2018	Allsvenskan	0	0	0	0	0	0	0	0
Eskilsminne (loan)	2019	Swedish Division 1	5	0	–		–		5	0
Lunds BK (loan)	2020	Ettan	15	0	–		–		15	0
Östers IF (loan)	2021	Superettan	23	0	3	0	–		26	0
Östers IF (loan)	2022	Superettan	22	0	1	0	–		23	0
Östers IF (loan)	Total		45	0	4	0	0	0	49	0
Örgryte IS (loan)	2023	Superettan	32	0	0	0	–		32	0
IF Gnistan (loan)	2024	Veikkausliiga	7	0	0	0	1 (Note: Includes Finnish League Cup)	0	8	0
Gefle IF	2024	Superettan	11	0	1	0	–		12	0
Trelleborg	2025	Superettan	19	0	2	0	–		21	0
Örgryte	2026	Allsvenskan	0	0	1	0	–		1	0
Career total			134	0	8	0	1	0	143	0
