= Patriot Sejdiu =

Kosovan footballer (born 2000)

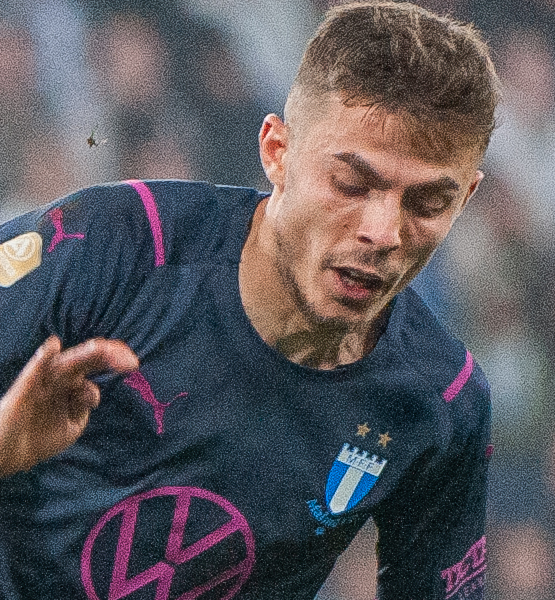
- Sejdiu in action with Malmö FF in 2022

Personal information
- Date of birth: 5 May 2000 (age 26)
- Place of birth: Pristina, Kosovo under UN administration
- Height: 1.82 m (6 ft 0 in)
- Position: Right winger

Youth career
- Hörby
- –2015: Södra Rörum
- 2015–2019: Malmö FF

Senior career*
Years	Team	Apps	(Gls)
2020–2025	Malmö FF	29	(5)
2020	→ Dalkurd (loan)	16	(5)
2023–2024	→ NAC Breda (loan)	18	(4)
2024–2025	→ Roda JC (loan)	30	(4)
2025	→ Östers IF (loan)	10	(0)
2026	UTA Arad	0	(0)

International career^{‡}
2022	Kosovo U21	1	(0)
- * Club domestic league appearances and goals as of 12 November 2025 ‡ National team caps and goals as of 25 March 2022

Patriot Sejdiu (born 5 May 2000) is a professional footballer who plays as a right winger.

== Club career ==
=== Malmö FF ===
On 8 January 2020, Sejdiu signed his first professional contract with Allsvenskan side Malmö FF after agreeing to a one-season deal and received squad number 36.

==== Loan to Dalkurd ====
On 30 January 2020, Sejdiu joined Superettan side Dalkurd, on a season-long loan. His debut with Dalkurd came on 16 June in a 0–0 away draw against Akropolis after coming on as a substitute at 74th minute in place of Arian Kabashi.

==== Return from loan ====
Sejdiu returned to Malmö at the beginning of the 2021 season, but without being able to play due to knee injury. On 20 November 2021, he was named as a Malmö substitute for the first time in a league match against Häcken. His debut with Malmö came on 26 February 2022 in the 2021–22 Svenska Cupen group stage against Ängelholm after coming on as a substitute at 84th minute in place of Veljko Birmančević.

==== Loan to NAC Breda ====
On 10 August 2023, Sejdiu moved on a new loan to NAC Breda in the Netherlands, with an option to buy.

==== Loan to Roda ====
On 9 July 2024, Sejdiu returned to the Netherlands and joined Roda JC on a season-long loan. He made his debut for the club on 12 August, coming on for Arjen van der Heide in the 59th minute of the season's opening fixture against Jong AZ. He missed a penalty shortly after, and the team suffered a heavy 6–1 defeat. He left the club upon the expiry of his loan at the end of the season.

==== Loan to Östers ====
On 23 June 2025, Sejdiu joined Östers IF on a loan-deal for the rest of 2025-season.

== International career ==
In January 2020, Sejdiu becomes part of Sweden U20 with which he made his debut in a unofficial friendly match against Anorthosis Famagusta U21 after being named in the starting line-up and scored his side's sixth goal during a 7–0 away deep win.

On 29 August 2020, Sejdiu received a call-up from Kosovo U21 for the 2021 UEFA European Under-21 Championship qualification match against England U21. His debut with Kosovo U21 came on 25 March 2022 in a 2023 UEFA European Under-21 Championship qualification match against Slovenia U21 after being named in the starting line-up.

== Honours ==
Malmö FF

- Allsvenskan: 2023
- Svenska Cupen: 2021–22
