= 2021 Malmö FF season =

Malmö FF
2021 season
- Chairman: Anders Pålsson
- Head coach: Jon Dahl Tomasson
- Stadium: Eleda Stadion
- Allsvenskan: 1st
- 2020–21 Svenska Cupen: Group stage
- 2021–22 Svenska Cupen: Winners
- 2021–22 UEFA Champions League: Group stage
- Top goalscorer: League: Antonio Čolak (14); All: Antonio Čolak (22)
- Highest home attendance: 21,067 (3 October vs Mjällby, Allsvenskan)
Home colours	Away colours	Third colours

The 2021 season is Malmö FF's 110th in existence, their 86th season in Allsvenskan and their 21st consecutive season in the league. They competed in the Allsvenskan, the 2020–21 Svenska Cupen, the 2021–22 Svenska Cupen, and the UEFA Champions League.

== Players ==
=== Squad ===
Note: Flags indicate national team as defined under FIFA eligibility rules; some limited exceptions apply. Players may hold more than one non-FIFA nationality.

No.	Pos.	Nation	Player
1	GK	SWE	Melker Ellborg
2	DF	SWE	Eric Larsson
3	DF	DEN	Jonas Knudsen
4	DF	FIN	Niklas Moisander
5	MF	DEN	Søren Rieks
6	MF	SWE	Oscar Lewicki
7	MF	SWE	Erdal Rakip
8	MF	ISL	Arnór Ingvi Traustason
8	MF	SWE	Pavle Vagić
8	MF	PER	Sergio Peña
9	FW	CRO	Antonio Čolak (on loan from PAOK)
10	MF	DEN	Anders Christiansen (captain)
11	FW	SWE	Ola Toivonen (Vice captain)
13	DF	SWE	Martin Olsson
14	DF	SWE	Felix Beijmo
15	DF	BIH	Anel Ahmedhodžić
16	GK	SWE	Mathias Nilsson
17	FW	GHA	Malik Abubakari
18	MF	USA	Romain Gall
19	MF	SRB	Veljko Birmančević

No.	Pos.	Nation	Player
20	MF	NGR	Bonke Innocent
21	MF	SWE	Peter Gwargis
22	FW	BIH	Adi Nalić
23	FW	SWE	Marcus Antonsson
24	DF	DEN	Lasse Nielsen
25	MF	SWE	Aleksander Damnjanovic Nilsson
26	MF	SWE	Mubaarak Nuh
27	GK	SWE	Johan Dahlin
28	MF	SWE	David Edvardsson
29	DF	SWE	Noah Eile
30	GK	MLI	Ismael Diawara
30	GK	SWE	Marko Johansson
31	DF	SWE	Franz Brorsson
32	MF	NOR	Jo Inge Berget
34	MF	SWE	Markus Björkqvist
36	MF	KOS	Patriot Sejdiu
37	MF	SWE	Sebastian Nanasi
39	FW	SWE	Amin Sarr
—	DF	MLI	Ismaël Sidibé

=== Players in/out ===
==== In ====
No.	Pos.	Nat.	Name	Age	Moving from	Type	Transfer window	Ends	Transfer fee	Source
19	MF	(Serbia)	Veljko Birmančević	22	Čukarički (Serbia)	Transfer	Winter	2024	(€1,000,000)	mff.se
9	FW	(Croatia)	Antonio Čolak	27	PAOK (Greece)	Loan	Winter	2021		mff.se
–	DF	(Mali)	Ismaël Sidibé	19	Performance de Kabbalah (Mali)	Transfer	Winter	2023	Undisclosed	mff.se
21	MF	(Sweden)	Peter Gwargis	20	Brighton (England)	Transfer	Summer	2024	Free	mff.se
17	FW	(Ghana)	Malik Abubakari	21	Moreirense (Portugal)	Transfer	Summer	2025	(€750,000)	mff.se
4	DF	(Finland)	Niklas Moisander	35	Werder Bremen (Germany)	Transfer	Summer	2022	Free	mff.se
8	MF	(Peru)	Sergio Peña	25	Emmen (Netherlands)	Transfer	Summer	2024	(€1,000,000)	mff.se
30	GK	(Mali)	Ismael Diawara	26	Degerfors IF (Sweden)	Transfer	Summer	2022	Undisclosed	mff.se
13	DF	(Sweden)	Martin Olsson	33	BK Häcken	Transfer	Summer	2022	(€500,000)	mff.se

==== Out ====
No.	Pos.	Nat.	Name	Age	Moving to	Type	Transfer window	Transfer fee	Source
4	DF	(Sweden)	Behrang Safari	35	Lunds SK	End of contract	Winter	Free	mff.se
1	GK	(Czech Republic)	Dušan Melichárek	37	Free agent	End of contract	Winter		mff.se
35	MF	(Sweden)	Samuel Adrian	22	Falkenbergs FF	Loan	Winter	–	mff.se
38	DF	(Sweden)	Linus Borgström	19	Falkenbergs FF	Loan	Winter	–	mff.se
17	DF	(Sweden)	Rasmus Bengtsson	34	Retired	End of contract	Winter		mff.se
23	FW	(Sweden)	Marcus Antonsson	29	Halmstads BK	Loan	Winter	–	mff.se
8	MF	(Iceland)	Arnór Ingvi Traustason	27	New England Revolution (United States)	Transfer	Winter	Undisclosed	mff.se
18	MF	(United States)	Romain Gall	25	Örebro SK	Loan	Winter	–	mff.se
16	GK	(Sweden)	Mathias Nilsson	22	Östers IF	Loan	Summer	–	mff.se
28	MF	(Sweden)	David Edvardsson	19	Jammerbugt FC (Denmark)	Loan	Summer	–	mff.se
26	MF	(Sweden)	Mubaarak Nuh	19	Jammerbugt FC (Denmark)	Loan	Summer	–	mff.se
	DF	(Mali)	Ismaël Sidibé	19	Jammerbugt FC (Denmark)	Loan	Summer	–	mff.se
39	FW	(Sweden)	Amin Sarr	20	Mjällby AIF	Loan	Summer	–	mff.se
30	GK	(Sweden)	Marko Johansson	22	Hamburger SV (Germany)	Transfer	Summer	Undisclosed	mff.se
40	MF	(Sweden)	Hugo Andersson	22	IFK Värnamo	Loan	Summer	–	mff.se
33	MF	(Sweden)	Amel Mujanic	20	Östers IF	Loan	Summer	–	mff.se
8	MF	(Sweden)	Pavle Vagić	21	Rosenborg BK (Norway)	Transfer	Summer	(€1,000,000)	mff.se
25	MF	(Sweden)	Aleksander Damnjanovic Nilsson	18	Jammerbugt FC (Denmark)	Loan	Summer	–	mff.se

== Player statistics ==
=== Appearances and goals ===
As of 8 December 2021

Number	Position	Name	2021 Allsvenskan		2020–21 Svenska Cupen 2021–22 Svenska Cupen		2021–22 UEFA Champions League		Total	
Number	Position	Name	Appearances	Goals	Appearances	Goals	Appearances	Goals	Appearances	Goals
1	GK	Melker Ellborg	0	0	0	0	0	0	0	0
2	DF	Eric Larsson	23	0	1	0	9	0	33	0
3	DF	Jonas Knudsen	12	1	3	0	2	0	17	1
4	DF	Niklas Moisander	9	0	0	0	8	0	17	0
5	MF	Søren Rieks	18	6	1	0	11	2	30	8
6	MF	Oscar Lewicki	11	0	0	0	10	0	21	0
7	MF	Erdal Rakip	25	2	4	0	14	0	43	2
8	MF	Arnór Ingvi Traustason	0	0	2	0	0	0	2	0
8	MF	Pavle Vagić	7	0	1	0	0	0	8	0
8	MF	Sergio Peña	9	0	0	0	5	0	14	0
9	FW	Antonio Čolak	26	14	1	3	14	5	41	22
10	MF	Anders Christiansen	22	6	3	1	11	2	36	9
11	FW	Ola Toivonen	8	0	3	1	0	0	11	1
13	DF	Martin Olsson	13	0	0	0	6	0	19	0
14	DF	Felix Beijmo	14	0	3	0	6	0	23	0
15	DF	Anel Ahmedhodžić	25	1	3	0	12	0	40	1
16	GK	Mathias Nilsson	0	0	0	0	0	0	0	0
17	FW	Malik Abubakari	15	3	1	1	8	0	24	4
18	MF	Romain Gall	0	0	0	0	0	0	0	0
19	MF	Veljko Birmančević	28	9	1	1	13	4	42	14
20	MF	Bonke Innocent	17	0	1	0	13	0	31	0
21	MF	Peter Gwargis	5	0	0	0	0	0	5	0
22	MF	Adi Nalić	29	6	2	0	10	0	41	6
23	FW	Marcus Antonsson	0	0	3	1	0	0	3	1
24	DF	Lasse Nielsen	20	1	2	0	12	0	34	1
25	MF	Aleksander Damnjanovic Nilsson	0	0	0	0	0	0	0	0
26	MF	Mubaarak Nuh	0	0	0	0	0	0	0	0
27	GK	Johan Dahlin	19	0	1	0	12	0	32	0
28	MF	David Edvardsson	0	0	0	0	0	0	0	0
29	DF	Noah Eile	3	0	0	0	1	0	4	0
30	GK	Ismael Diawara	3	0	0	0	4	0	7	0
30	GK	Marko Johansson	9	0	3	0	0	0	12	0
31	DF	Franz Brorsson	24	0	3	0	10	0	37	0
32	MF	Jo Inge Berget	27	5	4	0	12	1	43	6
34	MF	Markus Björkqvist	4	0	2	0	0	0	6	0
36	MF	Patriot Sejdiu	0	0	0	0	0	0	0	0
37	MF	Sebastian Nanasi	13	1	3	1	4	0	20	2
39	FW	Amin Sarr	3	0	3	1	1	0	7	1
43	DF	Emil Lindman	0	0	1	0	0	0	1	0
44	FW	Hugo Bolin	0	0	1	0	0	0	1	0
45	MF	Samuel Burakowsky	0	0	1	0	0	0	1	0

== Competitions ==
=== Allsvenskan ===
==== League table ====
Pos	Team	Pld	W	D	L	GF	GA	GD	Pts	Qualification or relegation
1	Malmö FF (C)	30	17	8	5	58	30	+28	59	Qualification for the Champions League first qualifying round
2	AIK	30	18	5	7	45	25	+20	59	Qualification for the Europa Conference League second qualifying round (Note: The 2021–22 Svenska Cupen winners qualified for the Europa Conference League second qualifying round. Since the cup winners (Malmö FF) qualified based on league position, the cup winner spot was passed to the second-placed team, and the last Conference League second qualifying round spot was passed to the fourth-placed team.)
3	Djurgårdens IF	30	17	6	7	46	30	+16	57	Qualification for the Europa Conference League second qualifying round
4	IF Elfsborg	30	17	4	9	51	35	+16	55	Qualification for the Europa Conference League second qualifying round
5	Hammarby IF	30	15	8	7	54	41	+13	53	

Source: svenskfotboll.se (in Swedish)
Rules for classification: 1) Points; 2) Goal difference; 3) Goals scored; 4) Head-to-head points; 5) Head-to-head goal difference; 6) Head-to-head away goals scored; 7) Play-off
(Note: Play-off is only played if need to decide champion, teams for relegation or UEFA competition and will be played on a neutral ground).
(C) Champions

==== Results summary ====
Overall								Home						Away					
Pld	W	D	L	GF	GA	GD	Pts	W	D	L	GF	GA	GD	W	D	L	GF	GA	GD
30	17	8	5	58	30	+28	59	8	5	2	31	16	+15	9	3	3	27	14	+13

Source: svenskfotboll.se (in Swedish)

==== Results by round ====
Round	1	2	3	4	5	6	7	8	9	10	11	12	13	14	15	16	17	18	19	20	21	22	23	24	25	26	27	28	29	30
Ground	H	A	H	A	H	A	H	A	A	H	A	A	H	A	H	H	A	H	H	A	H	H	A	A	H	A	A	H	A	H
Result	W	W	D	L	W	D	W	W	L	W	W	W	W	D	L	W	L	D	D	W	W	L	W	D	W	W	W	D	W	D
Position	3	2	2	6	3	3	2	2	2	2	2	2	2	1	2	2	3	4	4	3	2	3	1	3	1	1	1	1	1	1

Source: see below
A = Away; H = Home; W = Win; D = Draw; L = Loss

==== Matches ====
10 April 2021 Matchday 1	Malmö FF	3–2	Hammarby IF	Malmö
15:00	Christiansen 36' (pen.); Rieks 40'; Knudsen 89'	Report	Ludwigson 21'; Khalili 45+7'	Stadium: Eleda Stadion; Referee: Mohammed Al-Hakim

18 April 2021 Matchday 2	BK Häcken	1–2	Malmö FF	Gothenburg
15:00	Traoré 53'	Report	Ahmedhodžić 9'; Rieks 20'	Stadium: Bravida Arena; Referee: Glenn Nyberg

25 April 2021 Matchday 3	Malmö FF	1–1	Östersunds FK	Malmö
17:30	Čolak 52'	Report	Mukiibi 81'	Stadium: Eleda Stadion; Attendance: 8 Referee: Kristoffer Karlsson

3 May 2021 Matchday 4	Djurgårdens IF	3–1	Malmö FF	Stockholm
18:30	Bärkroth 31', 70'; Fonn Witry 67'	Report	Nalić 77'	Stadium: Tele2 Arena; Attendance: 8 Referee: Bojan Pandžić

9 May 2021 Matchday 5	Malmö FF	3–2	Varbergs BoIS	Malmö
17:30	Birmančević 12'; Nielsen 61'; Rieks 79'	Report	Stanisic 26'; Adjei 82'	Stadium: Eleda Stadion; Attendance: 8 Referee: Victor Wolf

13 May 2021 Matchday 6	AIK	1–1	Malmö FF	Stockholm
18:30	64' (o.g.)	Report	Berget 24'	Stadium: Friends Arena; Attendance: 8 Referee: Glenn Nyberg

17 May 2021 Matchday 7	Malmö FF	3–1	Kalmar FF	Malmö
18:30	Rakip 9'; Čolak 32', 57'	Report	Bergqvist 54'	Stadium: Eleda Stadion; Attendance: 8 Referee: Fredrik Klitte

20 May 2021 Matchday 13	Malmö FF	2–1	IF Elfsborg	Malmö
18:30	Berget 27'; Birmančević 64'	Report	Frick 50'	Stadium: Eleda Stadion; Attendance: 8 Referee: Adam Ladebäck

24 May 2021 Matchday 8	Örebro SK	1–2	Malmö FF	Örebro
18:30	Hümmet 64'	Report	Nalić 3'; Rakip 76'	Stadium: Behrn Arena; Attendance: 8 Referee: Kristoffer Karlsson

3 July 2021 Matchday 9	IFK Norrköping	3–2	Malmö FF	Norrköping
15:00	Björk 11'; Skúlason 39'; Lima 83'	Report	Čolak 13', 43'	Stadium: Nya Parken; Attendance: 2,487; Referee: Victor Wolf

10 July 2021 Matchday 10	Malmö FF	4−0	IK Sirius	Malmö
15:00	Čolak 1'; Rieks 22'; Birmančević 88'; Christiansen 90+3'	Report		Stadium: Eleda Stadion; Attendance: 4,226; Referee: Granit Maqedonci

17 July 2021 Matchday 11	Degerfors IF	0−5	Malmö FF	Degerfors
15:00		Report	Čolak 17'; Nalić 45'; Christiansen 51'; Birmančević 53', 55'	Stadium: Stora Valla; Attendance: 1,565; Referee: Adam Ladebäck

24 July 2021 Matchday 12	Mjällby AIF	0−2	Malmö FF	Hällevik
15:00		Report	58' (o.g.); Birmančević 61'	Stadium: Strandvallen; Attendance: 1,475; Referee: Bojan Pandžić

7 August 2021 Matchday 14	Halmstads BK	0−0	Malmö FF	Halmstad
17:30		Report		Stadium: Örjans Vall; Attendance: 2,015; Referee: Granit Maqedonci

14 August 2021 Matchday 15	Malmö FF	2–3	IFK Göteborg	Malmö
15:00	Čolak 7'; Abubakari 86'	Report	Berg 17'; 55' (o.g.); Sana 90+9' (pen.)	Stadium: Eleda Stadion; Attendance: 5,562; Referee: Glenn Nyberg

21 August 2021 Matchday 16	Malmö FF	3–0	Degerfors IF	Malmö
15:00	Birmančević 43'; Abubakari 69'; Christiansen 88'	Report		Stadium: Eleda Stadion; Attendance: 4,522; Referee: Fredrik Klitte

29 August 2021 Matchday 17	Hammarby IF	2–1	Malmö FF	Stockholm
17:30	Ludwigson 2'; Selmani 68'	Report	6' (o.g.)	Stadium: Tele2 Arena; Attendance: 10,002; Referee: Mohammed Al-Hakim

11 September 2021 Matchday 18	Malmö FF	1–1	IFK Norrköping	Malmö
15:00	Nalić 59'	Report	Adegbenro 90+5'	Stadium: Eleda Stadion; Attendance: 5,113; Referee: Adam Ladebäck

18 September 2021 Matchday 19	Malmö FF	1–1	Djurgårdens IF	Malmö
15:00	Čolak 16' (pen.)	Report	Ekdal 80'	Stadium: Eleda Stadion; Attendance: 5,532; Referee: Mohammed Al-Hakim

22 September 2021 Matchday 20	IF Elfsborg	0–1	Malmö FF	Borås
19:00		Report	76' (o.g.)	Stadium: Borås Arena; Attendance: 3,751; Referee: Kristoffer Karlsson

25 September 2021 Matchday 21	Malmö FF	5–1	Örebro SK	Malmö
17:30	Nanasi 13'; Čolak 45'; Christiansen 59' (pen.); Nalić 68'; Berget 75'	Report	Mehmeti 22'	Stadium: Eleda Stadion; Attendance: 5,559; Referee: Fredrik Klitte

3 October 2021 Matchday 22	Malmö FF	0−1	Mjällby AIF	Malmö
17:30		Report	Moro 15'	Stadium: Eleda Stadion; Attendance: 21,067; Referee: Bojan Pandzic

16 October 2021 Matchday 23	Östersunds FK	0−3	Malmö FF	Östersund
15:00		Report	Čolak 42' (pen.); Nalić 53'; Christiansen 56'	Stadium: Jämtkraft Arena; Attendance: 2,230; Referee: Granit Maqedonci

24 October 2021 Matchday 24	Varbergs BoIS	1–1	Malmö FF	Varberg
17:30	Simović 29'	Report	Birmančević 43'	Stadium: Påskbergsvallen; Attendance: 3,122; Referee: Glenn Nyberg

27 October 2021 Matchday 25	Malmö FF	1–0	AIK	Malmö
19:00	Birmančević 25'	Report		Stadium: Eleda Stadion; Attendance: 18,821; Referee: Mohammed Al-Hakim

30 October 2021 Matchday 26	IK Sirius	2–3	Malmö FF	Uppsala
15:00	Netabay 51'; Sylisufaj 53'	Report	Berget 49' (pen.); Čolak 76', 90+2'	Stadium: Studenternas IP; Attendance: 4,511; Referee: Bojan Pandžić

7 November 2021 Matchday 27	IFK Göteborg	0–2	Malmö FF	Gothenburg
17:30		Report	Rieks 27', 70'	Stadium: Gamla Ullevi; Attendance: 16,781; Referee: Kristoffer Karlsson

20 November 2021 Matchday 28	Malmö FF	2–2	BK Häcken	Malmö
15:00	Čolak 5'; Abubakari 84'	Report	Jeremejeff 63'; Wålemark 70'	Stadium: Eleda Stadion; Attendance: 17,218; Referee: Adam Ladebäck

28 November 2021 Matchday 29	Kalmar FF	0–1	Malmö FF	Kalmar
17:30		Report	Berget 83'	Stadium: Guldfågeln Arena; Attendance: 8,721; Referee: Mohammed Al-Hakim

4 December 2021 Matchday 30	Malmö FF	0–0	Halmstads BK	Malmö
15:00		Report		Stadium: Eleda Stadion; Attendance: 20,373; Referee: Glenn Nyberg

=== Svenska Cupen ===
Kickoff times are in UTC+1 unless stated otherwise.

==== 2020–21 ====
The tournament continued from the 2020 season.

===== Group stage =====
Pos	Team	Pld	W	D	L	GF	GA	GD	Pts	Qualification
1	Västerås SK	3	2	1	0	5	1	+4	7	Advance to Knockout stage
2	GAIS	3	2	0	1	3	3	0	6	
3	Malmö FF	3	1	0	2	5	4	+1	3	
4	Halmstads BK	3	0	1	2	1	6	−5	1	

Updated to match(es) played on 6 March 2021. Source: Swedish Football Association
Rules for classification: 1) Points; 2) Goal difference; 3) Goals scored; 4) Head-to-head record; 5) Highest ranked team

21 February 2021 Matchday 1	Malmö FF	1–2	Västerås SK	Malmö
13:00	Christiansen 50'	Report	Ribeiro 39'; Johansson 65'	Stadium: Malmö IP; Attendance: 0 Referee: Kristoffer Karlsson

1 March 2020 Matchday 2	GAIS	1–0	Malmö FF	Gothenburg
19:00	Maric 12'	Report		Stadium: Bravida Arena; Attendance: 0 Referee: Bojan Pandzic

6 March 2020 Matchday 3	Malmö FF	4–1	Halmstads BK	Malmö
13:00	Antonsson 33'; Nanasi 51'; Toivonen 54'; Sarr 74'	Report	Al-Ammari 40'	Stadium: Malmö IP; Attendance: 0 Referee: Fredrik Klitte

==== 2021–22 ====
===== Qualification stage =====
13 October 2021 Round 2	Malmö FF	5−1	Onsala BK	Malmö
20:00	Čolak 9', 20', 66'; Birmančević 48'; Abubakari 53'	Report	Andersson 41'	Stadium: Eleda Stadion; Referee: Adi Aganovic

=== UEFA Champions League ===
Kickoff times are in UTC+2 unless stated otherwise.

==== Qualifying phase and play-off round ====
===== First qualifying round =====
7 July 2021 First Leg	Malmö FF	1−0	Riga FC	Malmö
19:00	Čolak 50'	Report		Stadium: Eleda Stadion; Attendance: 4,012; Referee: Kaarlo Oskari Hämäläinen

13 July 2021 Second Leg	Riga FC	1−1 (1−2 agg.)	Malmö FF	Riga
18:00 (19:00 EEST)	Paurević 57'	Report	Čolak 33'	Stadium: Skonto Stadium; Attendance: 637; Referee: Gergő Bogár

===== Second qualifying round =====
21 July 2021 First Leg	Malmö FF	2−1	HJK	Malmö
19:00	Čolak 45+1'; Christiansen 74'	Report	Ro. Riski 68'	Stadium: Eleda Stadion; Attendance: 5,324; Referee: Mykola Balakin

27 July 2021 Second Leg	HJK	2−2 (3−4 agg.)	Malmö FF	Helsinki
18:00 (19:00 EEST)	Tenho 1'; Ri. Riski 78'	Report	Christiansen 11'; Birmančević 76'	Stadium: Bolt Arena; Attendance: 6,465; Referee: Stuart Attwell

===== Third qualifying round =====
3 August 2021 First Leg	Malmö FF	2–1	Rangers	Malmö
19:00	Rieks 47'; Birmančević 49'	Report	Davis 90+5'	Stadium: Eleda Stadion; Attendance: 5,820; Referee: Szymon Marciniak

10 August 2021 Second Leg	Rangers	1–2 (2–4 agg.)	Malmö FF	Glasgow
20:45 (19:45 BST)	Morelos 18'	Report	Čolak 53', 57'	Stadium: Ibrox Stadium; Attendance: 47,021; Referee: Slavko Vinčić

===== Play-off round =====
18 August 2021 First Leg	Malmö FF	2–0	Ludogorets Razgrad	Malmö
21:00	Birmančević 26'; Berget 61'	Report		Stadium: Eleda Stadion; Attendance: 5,463; Referee: Antonio Mateu Lahoz

24 August 2021 Second Leg	Ludogorets Razgrad	2–1 (2–3 agg.)	Malmö FF	Razgrad
21:00	Nedyalkov 10'; Sotiriou 60' (pen.)	Report	Birmančević 42'	Stadium: Huvepharma Arena; Attendance: 5,130; Referee: Clément Turpin

==== Group stage ====
The draw for the group stage was held on 26 August 2021.

Pos	Team	Pld	W	D	L	GF	GA	GD	Pts	Qualification	JUV	CHE	ZEN	MAL
1	(Italy) Juventus	6	5	0	1	10	6	+4	15	Advance to knockout phase	—	1–0	4–2	1–0
2	(England) Chelsea	6	4	1	1	13	4	+9	13	Advance to knockout phase	4–0	—	1–0	4–0
3	(Russia) Zenit Saint Petersburg	6	1	2	3	10	10	0	5	Transfer to Europa League	0–1	3–3	—	4–0
4	(Sweden) Malmö FF	6	0	1	5	1	14	−13	1		0–3	0–1	1–1	—

Source: UEFA
Rules for classification: Group stage tiebreakers

14 September 2021 Matchday 1	Malmö FF (Sweden)	0–3	(Italy) Juventus	Malmö, Sweden
21:00		Report	Alex Sandro 23'; Dybala 45' (pen.); Morata 45+1'	Stadium: Eleda Stadion; Attendance: 5,832; Referee: Artur Soares Dias (Portugal)

29 September 2021 Matchday 2	Zenit Saint Petersburg (Russia)	4–0	(Sweden) Malmö FF	Saint Petersburg, Russia
18:45	Claudinho 9'; Kuzyayev 49'; Sutormin 80'; Wendel 90+4'	Report		Stadium: Krestovsky Stadium; Attendance: 15,339; Referee: Anastasios Sidiropoulos (Greece)

20 October 2021 Matchday 3	Chelsea (England)	4–0	(Sweden) Malmö FF	London, England
21:00	Christensen 9'; Jorginho 21' (pen.), 57' (pen.); Havertz 48'	Report		Stadium: Stamford Bridge; Attendance: 39,095; Referee: François Letexier (France)

2 November 2021 Matchday 4	Malmö FF (Sweden)	0–1	(England) Chelsea	Malmö, Sweden
18:45		Report	Ziyech 56'	Stadium: Eleda Stadion; Attendance: 19,551; Referee: Felix Brych (Germany)

23 November 2021 Matchday 5	Malmö FF (Sweden)	1–1	(Russia) Zenit Saint Petersburg	Malmö, Sweden
18:45	Rieks 28'	Report	Rakitskyi 90+2' (pen.)	Stadium: Eleda Stadion; Referee: Andris Treimanis (Latvia)

8 December 2021 Matchday 6	Juventus (Italy)	1–0	(Sweden) Malmö FF	Turin, Italy
18:45	Kean 18'	Report		Stadium: Juventus Stadium; Referee: Irfan Peljto (Bosnia and Herzegovina)

== Non-competitive ==
=== Pre-season ===
Kickoff times are in UTC+1 unless stated otherwise.

29 January 2021	IFK Malmö	2–2	Malmö FF	Malmö
19:00	Fredin 59'; Rustemaj 78' (pen.)	Report	Toivonen 22'; Christiansen 69'	Stadium: Malmö IP; Attendance: 0

6 February 2021	Kalmar FF	2–2	Malmö FF	Kalmar
14:00	Antonsson 10', 14'	Report	Mortensen 68'; Gustafsson 85'	Stadium: Gastens IP; Attendance: 0

12 February 2021	Malmö FF	0–2	Mjällby AIF	Malmö
15:00		Report	Löfquist 40'; Gustavsson 53'	Stadium: Malmö IP; Attendance: 0

16 February 2021	Malmö FF	4–2	Falkenbergs FF	Malmö
13:30	Ahmedhodžić 10'; Nuh 47'; Nanasi	Report	Bergmark Wiberg 73'; Garbett	Stadium: Malmö IP; Attendance: 0

22 February 2021	Malmö FF	3–0	Trelleborgs FF	Malmö
13:30	Nuh 40'; Nanasi 47' (pen.), 79'	Report		Stadium: Malmö IP; Attendance: 0

13 March 2021	IF Elfsborg	4–0	Malmö FF	Borås
15:00	Alm 41'; Ndione 51'; Strand 70'; Cooper-Love 90'	Report		Stadium: Borås Arena; Attendance: 0

13 March 2021	IF Elfsborg	1–3	Malmö FF	Borås
17:15	Qasem 38'	Report	Nalic 10'; Birmančević 27', 63'	Stadium: Borås Arena; Attendance: 0

21 March 2021	Malmö FF	1–1	Örebro SK	Malmö
13:00	Toivonen 23'	Report	Seger 3'	Stadium: Malmö IP; Attendance: 0

21 March 2021	Malmö FF	4–1	Örebro SK	Malmö
15:30	Rieks 19'; Nalic 22'; Nuh 24', 81'	Report	Svedin 90'	Stadium: Malmö IP; Attendance: 0

26 March 2021	Malmö FF	2–1	IFK Göteborg	Malmö
14:00	Čolak 48' (pen.); Nanasi 53'	Report	Sana 13'	Stadium: Eleda Stadion; Attendance: 0

=== Mid-season ===
Kickoff times are in UTC+2 unless stated otherwise.

12 June 2021	Malmö FF	0–1	Kalmar FF	Malmö
15:00		Report	Shamoun 67'	Stadium: Heleneholms IP

19 June 2021	Malmö FF	2–0	IF Elfsborg	Malmö
15:30	Sarr 45+3'; Čolak 57'	Report		Stadium: Eleda Stadion

27 June 2021	Malmö FF	1–2	FC Midtjylland	Malmö
14:00	Beijmo 77'	Report	Anderson 51'; Dreyer 54'	Stadium: Eleda Stadion

27 June 2021	Malmö FF	2–0	HB Køge	Malmö
17:00	Birmančević 12'; Larsson 45'	Report		Stadium: Malmö Stadion

28 July 2021	Malmö FF	1–2	IFK Malmö	Malmö
15:00	Damnjanovic Nilsson 2'	Report	Rindmo 15' (pen.); Andersson 24'	Stadium: Hybriden
