= Johnbosco Kalu =

Nigerian footballer (born 1997)

Personal information
- Full name: Johnbosco Samuel Kalu
- Date of birth: 10 December 1997 (age 28)
- Height: 1.87 m (6 ft 1 1/2 in)
- Position: Striker

Team information
- Current team: Beitar Jerusalem
- Number: 9

Senior career*
Years	Team	Apps	(Gls)
2017	Växjö United FC	21	(15)
2018	Hovshaga AIF	16	(11)
2019	Växjö United FC	2	(0)
2019	Växjö BoIS	18	(47)
2020	Slätthögs BOIF	10	(15)
2021	Vrigstads IF	10	(24)
2022	Räppe GoIF	0	(0)
2022–2025	IFK Värnamo	36	(9)
2025–	Beitar Jerusalem	33	(8)
- * Club domestic league appearances and goals as of 14:44, 15 June 2026 (UTC)

Johnbosco Samuel Kalu (born 10 December 1997) is a Nigerian footballer who plays as a striker for Beitar Jerusalem.

== Early career ==
As a child, Kalu played football leisurely. Kalu came to Sweden from a Nigerian academy in 2016, at the behest of Abdi Elmi, leader of Växjo United. While the club was playing as low as the fifth tier, Division 3, it had ambitions to rise quickly through the league system. However, the administration of Växjö United was erratic, with insufficient wages being paid.

Kalu joined Hovshaga AIF which resided even lower in the league system, but during that time, he faced problems with a work permit. As the clubs he played for were far from professional, Kalu was denied a work permit in 2018, with the authorities deciding to deport him to Nigeria. Kalu met an "entrepreneur" who gave Kalu a civic job and brought the player to a succession of other clubs in which the "entrepreneur" chose to engage, eventually as low as the seventh tier, Division 5. Johnbosco Samuel Kalu was completely dominant in some of those clubs, scoring 47 goals in 18 league games for Växjö BoIS. People in the Växjö area started chatting about the player who was out of his league, and scouts noticed the Nigerian player. An upwards step was taken when Kalu trained with Räppe GoIF in the winter of 2021, but still no higher than the fourth tier.

In February 2022, his legal case was decided by the Swedish Migration Agency, which decided to deport Kalu. In a last-ditch effort to secure Kalu a work permit, Räppe GoIF fielded Kalu in friendly matches against larger teams, and after excelling in a such game against Östers IF, Kalu was signed by IFK Värnamo.

== IFK Värnamo ==
With time being critical, IFK Värnamo and Kalu signed a three-year contract. However, the deportation was effectuated on 1 April 2022. Kalu was also issued a ban on reentry to Sweden. Värnamo was not allowed to pay him, and he subsisted in Nigeria on private contributions. After working through the legal proceedings, Kalu was allowed to return to Sweden and Värnamo in the summer of 2023. He made his Allsvenskan debut on 14 August 2023. IFK Värnamo still had faith in the player, and in January 2024 he signed a new contract spanning two years.

Kalu then made his definite breakthrough in the first half of the 2024 season, having scored 5 league goals by early June. He became the internal top goalscorer of IFK Värnamo in the 2024 Allsvenskan, tied with Ajdin Zeljkovic, at 7 goals.

In June 2024, a transfer bid on Kalu was placed by Ujpest FC. When Värnamo rejected both this bid and another from Beitar Jerusalem in January 2025, Kalu voiced dissatisfaction and called it "unfair treatment".
