= Charlie Vindehall =

Swedish footballer (born 1996)

Personal information
- Full name: Charlie Rikard Vindehall
- Date of birth: 8 May 1996 (age 30)
- Height: 1.74 m (5 ft 9 in)
- Position: Central midfielder

Team information
- Current team: Örgryte IS
- Number: 7

Youth career
- Hovshaga AIF
- –2015: Östers IF

Senior career*
Years	Team	Apps	(Gls)
2016	FK Älmeboda/Linneryd	20	(2)
2017–2018	Räppe GOIF	47	(4)
2019–2023	IFK Värnamo	100	(6)
2024–	Örgryte IS	61	(2)
- * Club domestic league appearances and goals as of 7 September 2026

Charlie Vindehall (born 8 May 1996) is a Swedish footballer who plays as a midfielder for Örgryte IS.

== Career ==
Hilvenius hails from Växjö and started his career in Hovshaga AIF, and also played youth football for Östers IF before starting his senior career in Division 3 (fifth tier). Following stints in FK Älmeboda/Linneryd and Räppe GoIF he joined IFK Värnamo in 2019. With Värnamo, he participated in back-to-back promotions, ending up in Allsvenskan in 2022 where he made his first-tier debut. He played sparingly in 2023 and left the club.

Ahead of the 2024 season he trained with Helsingborgs IF, but ended up signing for Superettan team Örgryte IS. The team won promotion from the 2025 Superettan through playoff.
