= 2021–22 Svenska Cupen =

Tournament details
- Country: Sweden
- Dates: 9 June 2021 – 26 May 2022
- Teams: 96

Final positions
- Champions: Malmö FF
- Runners-up: Hammarby IF

Tournament statistics
- Matches played: 119
- Goals scored: 404 (3.39 per match)
- Top goal scorer(s): Veljko Birmančević (7 goals)

The 2021–22 Svenska Cupen is the 66th season of the Svenska Cupen and the tenth season with the current format. The winners of the competition will secure a spot in the second qualifying round of the 2022–23 UEFA Europa Conference League, unless they had already qualified for European competition in the 2021–22 season, in which case the qualification spot will go to fourth-placed team of the 2021 Allsvenskan. A total of 96 clubs will enter the competition, 64 teams from district sites and 32 from the Allsvenskan and the Superettan.

== Round dates ==
The schedule of the competition is as follows.

Phase	Round	Match date
Initial rounds	Round 1	9 June - 10 July 2021
Initial rounds	Round 2	17 August - 20 October 2021
Group stage	Matchday 1	19 - 21 February 2022
Group stage	Matchday 2	26 - 28 February 2022
Group stage	Matchday 3	5 - 7 March 2022
Knockout stage	Quarter Final	12 - 14 March 2022
Knockout stage	Semi Final	19 - 20 March 2022
Knockout stage	Final	26 May 2022

== Teams ==
Round	Clubs remaining	Clubs involved	Winners from previous round	New entries this round	Leagues participating in this round
Round 1	96	64	0	64	Division 1 (22 teams); Division 2 (32 teams); Division 3 (6 teams); Division 4 (4 teams)
Round 2	64	64	32	32	Allsvenskan (16 teams); Superettan (16 teams)
Group stage	32	32	32	0	

== Round 1 ==
First round matches were played between 9 June and 10 July. 64 clubs from the third tier or lower of the Swedish league system competed in this round.

=== Matches ===
9 June 2021	Qviding	3-1	Trollhättan	Gothenburg
19:30 CEST (UTC+2)	Araba 52' 77'; Tidstrand 85'	Report	Fellrath (yellow card) 8'; Emanuelsson 39'; Emanuelsson (yellow card) 79'; Becker (yellow card) 90'	Stadium: Valhalla IP; Referee: Haris Memisevic

9 June 2021	Karlberg	0-1	Täby	Stockholm
19:30 CEST (UTC+2)	Soelberg (yellow card) 36'; Antonson (yellow card) 59'	Report	Uppling 2'; Eliasson (yellow card) 49'; Schildt (yellow card) 69'	Stadium: Stadshagens IP; Attendance: 100; Referee: Adli Assali

15 June 2021	Anderstorp	2-3	Ullared	Anderstorp
18:45 CEST (UTC+2)	Josefsson 2'; Murati 89'	Report	Wallnedal (yellow card) 38'; Jensen 48'; Hansson 54'; Torstensson 55'; Guey (yellow card) 69'	Referee: Alexander Eriksson

15 June 2021	Halmia	2-3	Eskilminne	Halmstad
19:00 CEST (UTC+2)	Eriksson 33'; Törnfeldt 54'	Report	Jassem 2' 90'; Lundborg (yellow card) 31'; Larsson 44'; Lundeberg (yellow card) 68'; Seger (yellow card) 81'	Stadium: Örjans Vall; Referee: Stjepan Dodik

15 June 2021	Friska Viljor	1-3	Hudiksvall	Örnsköldsvik
19:00 CEST (UTC+2)	Nordin 57'; Norberg (yellow card) 66'; Sedin (yellow card) 70'; Granath (yellow card) 74'; Millis (yellow card) 90+3'	Report	Hedlund 30'; Nuur 37'; Sener 67'	Stadium: Skyttis IP; Referee: Robin Albertsson

15 June 2021	Ahlafors	2-4 (a.e.t.)	Vänersborg	Nödinge-Nol
19:00 CEST (UTC+2)	Chika Chidi 13'; Elfving (yellow card) 40'; Leckborn (yellow card) 48'; Josefsson (yellow card) 69'; Zetterlund 79'; Hegab (yellow card) 104'	Report	Palumbo 6'; Hussein (yellow card) 43'; Zekovic (yellow card) 73'; Leidewall 81' 120'; Ekholm (yellow card) 104'; Ramadani (yellow card) 105'; Ramadani 112'; Berner (yellow card) 115'; Aronsson (yellow card) 118'	Stadium: Svenska Stenhus Arena 1 Attendance: 150; Referee: Mergim Rexhepi

15 June 2021	Enköping	1-5	Sollentuna	Enköping
19:30 CEST (UTC+2)	Sjöberg 35'	Report	Abdihakim Ali 21' 77'; Fredin 64'; Ali 73'; Ceylan 90+3'	Stadium: Enavallen; Attendance: 201; Referee: Erik Skotte

16 June 2021	Värmbol	2-1	Örebro Syrianska	Katrineholm
19:00 CEST (UTC+2)	Karjalainen 28'; Mesfun (yellow card) 63'; Mesfun 65'; Karjalainen (yellow card) 67'; Olsson (yellow card) 69'	Report	Bell (yellow card) 32'; Jaiteh 64'; Turan (yellow card) 75'	Stadium: Backavallen; Referee: Nael Ghazi Shabo

16 June 2021	Sylvia	3-2	Assyriska	Norrköping
19:00 CEST (UTC+2)	Burubwa 37'; Ståhl (yellow card) 39'; Gustavsson 74'; Näsström 76'	Report	Shlimon (yellow card) 30'; Muhsin 36'; Dimitrijevic 68'; Fritzson (yellow card) 77'; Omerovic (yellow card) 87'	Stadium: PlatinumCars Arena; Referee: Jovan Krsmanovic

16 June 2021	Skiljebo	1-0	Haninge	Västerås
19:00 CEST (UTC+2)	Raage 22'; Åkerberg (yellow card) 58'; Özer (yellow card) 90'	Report	Ndure (yellow card) 59'	Stadium: Hamre IP; Attendance: 100; Referee: Tom Ghorbani

16 June 2021	Västra Frölunda	0-1 (a.e.t.)	Utsikten	Gothenburg
19:00 CEST (UTC+2)	Clason (yellow card) 44'; Engberg (yellow card) 80'	Report	Klintberg (yellow card) 43'; Bosnic (yellow card) 44'; Andersson (yellow card) 78'; Olsson (yellow card) 102'; Podrimcaku 112'	Stadium: Ruddalens IP; Referee: Admir Hasanbegovic

16 June 2021	Karlstad	2-3	Karlslund	Karlstad
19:30 CEST (UTC+2)	Hareide 7'; Jansson (yellow card) 26'; Malmén (yellow card) 80'; Chebil 90+2'	Report	Baderkhan 15'; Gustafsson (yellow card) 71'; Sabriye 74'; Gustafsson 84'	Stadium: Örsholmens IP Docero Arena; Referee: Honraw Ghassali

16 June 2021	Balinge	1-4	Lidingö	Bälinge
19:30 CEST (UTC+2)	Cyr (yellow card) 29'; Lundin (yellow card) 42'; Lindqvist 72'; Lindqvist (yellow card) 85'	Report	Liljeström 8' 17'; Pekkari (yellow card) 42'; Kukavica (yellow card) 59'; Wahlman 80'; Jansson 87'	Stadium: Bälinge IP; Attendance: 125; Referee: Odai Alwani

16 June 2021	Tyresö	0-6	Brommapojkarna	Tyresö
20:00 CEST (UTC+2)	Lundgren (yellow card) 35'	Report	Leach Holm 12'; Nyström 28' 86'; Faraj 37' 52'; Gustafsson 44'	Stadium: Trollbäckens BP; Attendance: 200; Referee: Jonas Jonsson

20 June 2021	Visby	0-5	Rågsved	Visby
16:00 CEST (UTC+2)	Molin (yellow card) 50'; Lavergren (yellow card) 86'	Report	Kamnelius 58'; Notice 64'; Barka Hemgård 66'; Junus 79'; Kasa 88'	Stadium: Västerhejde IP; Attendance: 180; Referee: Koray Köylüoglu

27 June 2021	Fanna	0-6	Arameisk Syrianska	Enköping
18:00 CEST (UTC+2)	Stegnell (yellow card) 43'	Report	Bogdyuk 13' 47'; Haddad 44'; Ademi 53'; Youssef 71' 78'	Stadium: Fanna IP; Attendance: 98; Referee: Suhel Youssef

29 June 2021	Viken	1-0	Karlstad II	Åmål
19:00 CEST (UTC+2)	Svanström (yellow card) 17'; Johannesson 20'; Härd (yellow card) 88'	Report	Börne (yellow card) 52'	Stadium: Rösvallen; Referee: Adnan Busuladzic

30 June 2021	Rosengård	1-0	Torn	Malmö
19:00 CEST (UTC+2)	Diallo (yellow card) 19'; Ingheden 70'	Report	Robért (yellow card) 8'	Stadium: Malmö IP; Attendance: 80; Referee: Daniel Böcker

30 June 2021	Räppe	4-2 (a.e.t.)	Sölvesborg	Växjö
19:00 CEST (UTC+2)	Birgersson 25' 105' 120'; Ericsson (yellow card) 27'; Barck (yellow card) 87'; Gabrielsson (yellow card) 90+2'; Larson 100' (o.g.); Friman (yellow card) 102'; Birgersson (yellow card) 105'	Report	Torstensson 82'; Blekic (yellow card) 97'; Nilsson 115'; Nilsson (yellow card) 115'	Stadium: Räppevallen; Referee: Barech Afzal Khan

30 June 2021	Österlen	5-0	IFK Malmö	Skillinge
19:00 CEST (UTC+2)	Ahmad 8'; Motori 12' 26'; Osmanovski (yellow card) 34'; Hellichius 73'; Diawara 77'	Report	Balint (yellow card) 24'; Bunjaku (red card) 39'; Addae (red card) 44'	Stadium: Skillinge Idrottsplats; Attendance: 123; Referee: Oscar Johnson

30 June 2021	Onsala	2-0	Lindome	Onsala
19:00 CEST (UTC+2)	Lundgren 2'; Ternebrink 45'	Report	Peterson (yellow card) 39'; Nohlgren (yellow card) 74'	Stadium: Rydets IP; Referee: Mattias Theander

30 June 2021	Kristianstad	1-4	Lund	Kristianstad
19:00 CEST (UTC+2)	Dampha 8'; Svensson (yellow card) 24'; Nargilic (yellow card) 35'; Hedlin (yellow card) 87'	Report	Tran 53'; Manuela 55' 76'; Hansson (yellow card) 68'; Arnshed 83'	Stadium: Kristianstad Fotbollsarena; Referee: Ahmed Al-Kodri

30 June 2021	Husqvarna	1-1 (a.e.t.) (4-1 p)	Skövde	Huskvarna
19:00 CEST (UTC+2)	Björk (yellow card) 64'; Karlsson 86'; Karlström (yellow card) 119'	Report	Granath 6'; Ask (yellow card) 69'; Ibrahimovic (yellow card) 72'	Stadium: Vapenvallen; Attendance: 50; Referee: Fikret Buqa
	Penalties
	Iskandar (penalty scored); Lernesjö (penalty scored); Eriksson-Dorji (penalty scored); Benatallah (penalty scored)		Frisk (penalty scored)

30 June 2021	Enskede	1-3 (a.e.t.)	Stockholm Internazionale	Gamla Enskede
19:00 CEST (UTC+2)	Sanneh 40'; Kolarczyk (yellow card) 43'	Report	Nobell 56'; Akdemir (yellow card) 57'; Talebi (yellow card) 90+2'; Ostojic (yellow card) 90+7'; Ostojic 113' 120'	Stadium: Enskede IP; Referee: Jakob Lejonstad

30 June 2021	Dalby	1-5	Ängelholm	Dalby
19:00 CEST (UTC+2)	Kanizsai 66'	Report	Salama 15' 86'; Comnell 47'; Widén 51'; Sjöberg (yellow card) 60'; Harrysson (yellow card) 70'; Kinnander 79'	Stadium: Dalby IP; Referee: Niklas Olsson

30 June 2021	Kvarnsveden	0-4	Sandviken	Borlänge
19:15 CEST (UTC+2)		Report	Igbarumah 62'; Springfeldt 65'; Bråholm 72'; Thörn 76'	Stadium: Ljungbergsplanen; Attendance: 210; Referee: Robert Ahlman

30 June 2021	Stöde	1-1 (a.e.t.) (3-4 p)	Ytterhogdal	Stöde
19:30 CEST (UTC+2)	Angayeva (yellow card) 53'; Gharib (yellow card) 59'; Bio 68'; Dubon (yellow card) 73'	Report	Sesay 29'; Bouzidi (yellow card) 57' (red card) 73'; Sapienza (yellow card) 73'; Lokougnan (yellow card) 87'	Stadium: Stöde IP; Attendance: 50; Referee: Santiago Bedoya Sierra
	Penalties
	Unknown (penalty scored); Unknown (penalty scored); Unknown (penalty scored)		Unknown (penalty scored); Unknown (penalty scored); Unknown (penalty scored); Unknown (penalty scored)

30 June 2021	Sleipner	2-1	Oskarshamn	Norrköping
19:30 CEST (UTC+2)	Yuldashev (yellow card) 36'; Sotra (yellow card) 66'; Moreno 75'; Yuldashev 77'	Report	Jägerbrink (yellow card) 34'; Ekeroth (yellow card) 50' (red card) 90'; Ekeroth 59'; Masangane (yellow card) 63'	Stadium: PlatinumCars Arena; Referee: Paul Shamoun

30 June 2021	Mjölby	1-1 (a.e.t.) (4-3 p)	Nyköping	Mjölby
19:30 CEST (UTC+2)	Samuelsson (yellow card) 43'; Yilmaz (yellow card) 73'; Lindsten 99'; Lundquist (yellow card) 113'; Beurling (yellow card) 120'	Report	Andbjer (yellow card) 33'; Bergman (yellow card) 113' (red card) 113'; Nakouri (yellow card) 120'; Ahmetovic 120'; Ahmetovic (yellow card) 120'	Stadium: Vifolkavallen; Referee: Nael Ghazi Shabo
	Penalties
	Unknown (penalty scored); Unknown (penalty scored); Unknown (penalty scored); Unknown (penalty scored)		Unknown (penalty scored); Unknown (penalty scored); Unknown (penalty scored)

7 July 2021	Luleå	0-2	Umeå	Luleå
19:00 CEST (UTC+2)	Vikström (yellow card) 46'	Report	Chennoufi 20' 30'	Stadium: Skogsvallen; Referee: Oskar Nilsson

7 July 2021	Hvetlanda	2-2 (a.e.t.) (6-5 p)	Dalstorp	Jönköping
19:30 CEST (UTC+2)	Johansson 10' 93'; Johansson (yellow card) 34'; Andersson (yellow card) 41'; Granvik (yellow card) 82'; Al-Sadoon (yellow card) 114'	Report	Shabani 33'; Svenningsson (yellow card) 84'; Svenningsson 103'; Zeka (yellow card) 119'	Stadium: Heds Arena; Attendance: 128; Referee: Barech Afzal Khan
	Penalties
	Unknown (penalty scored); Unknown (penalty scored); Unknown (penalty scored); Unknown (penalty scored); Unknown (penalty scored); Unknown (penalty scored)		Unknown (penalty scored); Unknown (penalty scored); Unknown (penalty scored); Unknown (penalty scored); Unknown (penalty scored); Unknown (penalty missed)

10 July 2021	Lidköping	0-3	Oddevold	Lidköping
16:00 CEST (UTC+2)	Gustavsson (yellow card) 6'; Ring (yellow card) 90+3'	Report	Engelbrektsson 3'; Stroud 53'; Schöön 85'	Stadium: Lockörns IP; Attendance: 200; Referee: Daniel Särén

== Round 2 ==
64 teams competed in this round: 32 winners from Round 1 and the 32 teams from the 2021 Allsvenskan and 2021 Superettan.

=== Matches ===
17 August 2021	Österlen	0-3	IFK Göteborg	Skillinge
18:30 CEST (UTC+2)	Traore (yellow card) 32'	Report	Norlin 6'; Söder 15'; Aiesh 50'; Jeronimo (yellow card) 70'	Stadium: Skillinge IP; Referee: Adi Aganovic

17 August 2021	Sylvia	3-1	Eskilstuna	Norrköping
18:30 CEST (UTC+2)	Gustavsson 35' 52'; Ståhl (yellow card) 54'; Habte (yellow card) 71'; Tillmar 90'	Report	Rafael (yellow card) 34'; Tihi 43'; Coffey (yellow card) 79'	Stadium: PlatinumCars Arena; Referee: Kastriot Gerxhaliu

18 August 2021	Hvetlanda	0-5	Varberg	Jönköping
18:00 CEST (UTC+2)	Carlsson (yellow card) 53'	Report	Adjei 3'; Liljenbäck 21' 35'; Ayer 50'; Johansson 72'; Kunst (yellow card) 90'	Stadium: Heds Arena; Referee: Magnus Lindgren

18 August 2021	Skiljebo	3-1	Jönköping	Västerås
18:00 CEST (UTC+2)	Özer 50'; Stojanovic 52'; Abshir 76'	Report	Svensson (yellow card) 26' (red card) 85'; Barny 38'; Lamin (yellow card) 56'; Book (yellow card) 63'	Stadium: Hamre IP; Referee: Mohammadreza Faghani

18 August 2021	Lidingö	1-2 (a.e.t.)	Akropolis	Lidingö
18:00 CEST (UTC+2)	Lindqvist (yellow card) 35'; Stokki 80'	Report	Lepik 9'; Nikopoulos (yellow card) 52'; Lepik (yellow card) 75'; Stadler 97'	Stadium: Lidingövallen; Attendance: 300; Referee: Victor Wolf

18 August 2021	Ytterhogdal	3-2	Vasalund	Ytterhogdal
18:00 CEST (UTC+2)	Sesay 25' 29'; Richards (yellow card) 48'; Capone (yellow card) 64'; Sapienza (yellow card) 75'; Unknown 77' (o.g.); Yates (yellow card) 88'; Tonning (yellow card) 90+9'	Report	Vasic 53'; Bulut 65'; Söderberg (yellow card) 76'	Stadium: Svedjevallen; Referee: Erik Mattsson

18 August 2021	Husqvarna	0-3	Öster	Huskvarna
18:30 CEST (UTC+2)	Lindblad (yellow card) 78'; Arifovic (yellow card) 90+2'	Report	Kusu 6'; Silverholt 39'; Toris (yellow card) 80'; Toris 84'	Stadium: Vapenvallen; Referee: Jasmin Svraka

18 August 2021	Oddevold	2-3 (a.e.t.)	Falkenberg	Uddevalla
18:30 CEST (UTC+2)	Abed-Al-Mouti 10' 72'; Karlin (yellow card) 28'; Stroud (yellow card) 54'; Beqiri (yellow card) 62'; Pettersson (yellow card) 102'; Sundström (yellow card) 109'; Ibrahimovic (yellow card) 120'	Report	Karlsson (yellow card) 3'; Peter 5'; Englund (yellow card) 11'; Peter (yellow card) 12' (red card) 14'; Kizito 21'; Adrian (yellow card) 60' (red card) 120'; Özen (yellow card) 79'; Wede (yellow card) 90+2'; Wiberg 96'	Stadium: Rimnersvallen; Referee: Haris Memisevic

18 August 2021	Qviding	0-1	Mjällby	Gothenburg
18:30 CEST (UTC+2)	Ehner (yellow card) 47'; Araba (yellow card) 84'; Bernhardtz (yellow card) 90+3'	Report	Andersson (yellow card) 35'; Gracia (yellow card) 51'; Moro 57'; Nilsson (yellow card) 83'	Stadium: Valhalla IP; Referee: Fredrik Oppong

18 August 2021	Ängelholm	3-2 (a.e.t.)	Norrby	Ängelholm
18:30 CEST (UTC+2)	Norberg 19' 30'; Salama (yellow card) 68'; Kinnander (yellow card) 107'; Kinnander 114'	Report	Salo (yellow card) 21'; Milovanovic (yellow card) 46'; Örqvist 50'; Ärlig 60'; Pekalski (yellow card) 87'	Stadium: Ängelholms IP; Referee: Rinon Hasani

18 August 2021	Räppe	0-3	Halmstad	Växjö
18:30 CEST (UTC+2)		Report	Karim 10' 42' 57'; Kurtulus (yellow card) 89'	Stadium: Räppevallen; Referee: Andreas Dufva-Johansson

18 August 2021	Rosengård	0-3	Trelleborg	Malmö
18:30 CEST (UTC+2)	Diallo (yellow card) 28'; Alin (yellow card) 50'	Report	Håkansson 2'; Kozica 39'; Larsson 45'	Stadium: Malmö IP; Referee: Oscar Johnson

18 August 2021	Mjölby	1-2 (a.e.t.)	Örgryte	Mjölby
18:30 CEST (UTC+2)	Dagnäs 30'; J Samuelsson (yellow card) 55'; A Samuelsson (yellow card) 77'; Skhiri (yellow card) 83'; Hellqvist (red card) 106'	Report	Brorsson (red card) 88'; Ruiz 90+5'	Stadium: Vifolkavallen; Referee: Ahmed Al-Kodri

18 August 2021	Ullared	0-3	Värnamo	Ullared
18:30 CEST (UTC+2)	Wahlberg (yellow card) 90'	Report	Ismail 39'; Becirovic 55'; Hajdari 59'	Stadium: Hedevi IP; Referee: Fredrik Klitte

18 August 2021	Lund	1-3 (a.e.t.)	Kalmar	Lund
18:30 CEST (UTC+2)	Pivkovski 11'; Bohman (yellow card) 56'; Arnshed (yellow card) 75'	Report	Shamoun 7'; Benshi 96'; Backman 98'	Stadium: Klostergårdens IP; Attendance: 500; Referee: Robert Daradic

18 August 2021	Vänersborg	2-2 (a.e.t.) (3-4 p)	GAIS	Vänersborg
18:30 CEST (UTC+2)	Ramadani (yellow card) 21'; Ramadani 62'; Engström 107'; Engström (yellow card) 117'; Hellborg (yellow card) 120+3'	Report	Ladan 16'; Moenza (yellow card) 72'; Yarsuvat (yellow card) 84' (red card) 120+1'; Yarsuvat 100'; Andersson (yellow card) 114'	Stadium: Vänersvallen; Attendance: 530; Referee: Albert Mustafa
	Penalties
	Berner (penalty missed); Engström (penalty scored); Nyman (penalty scored); Leidewall (penalty scored); Palumbo (penalty missed)		Egnell (penalty scored); Ladan (penalty scored); Örnblom (penalty scored); Moenza (penalty missed); Lumbana (penalty scored)

18 August 2021	Utsikten	1-5	Häcken	Gothenburg
18:30 CEST (UTC+2)	Westermark (yellow card) 34'; Skoglund 48'; Skoglund (yellow card) 48'; Hedlund (yellow card) 78'; Jernarp (yellow card) 80'	Report	Traore 2' 57'; Jeremejeff 8'; Bengtsson 59'; Bengtsson (yellow card) 62'; Tuominen 82'	Stadium: Ruddalens IP; Referee: Joakim Östling

18 August 2021	Arameisk Syrianska	0-1 (a.e.t.)	Brage	Stockholm
18:30 CEST (UTC+2)	Lindgren (yellow card) 38'; Borsali (yellow card) 62'; Bakalakos (yellow card) 115'; Haddad (yellow card) 120'	Report	Pllana 118'	Stadium: Brunna IP; Attendance: 175; Referee: Adam Ladebäck

18 August 2021	Sleipner	1-8	Degerfors	Norrköping
18:30 CEST (UTC+2)	Citaku 12'; Appelquist (yellow card) 50'	Report	Dahlström 19' 29' 78' 90+2'; Abraham 25' 32' 40' 71'; Andersson (yellow card) 63'	Stadium: PlatinumCars Arena; Referee: Tom Ghorbani

18 August 2021	Karlslund	0-4	Djurgården	Örebro
18:30 CEST (UTC+2)	Ibrahimbegovic (yellow card) 64'	Report	Ademi 17' 58'; Hjalmar Ekdal 22' 39'	Stadium: Karlslund Arena; Attendance: 600; Referee: Jovan Krsmanovic

18 August 2021	Värmbol	0-4	Norrköping	Katrineholm
18:30 CEST (UTC+2)	Strömgren (yellow card) 7'; Lugonja (yellow card) 39'	Report	Levi 17' 42'; Björk 47'; Jóhannesson 63'	Stadium: Backavallen; Attendance: 600; Referee: Richard Sundell

18 August 2021	Sollentuna	2-1	Västerås	Sollentuna
18:30 CEST (UTC+2)	Ahlstrand (yellow card) 19'; Sandell 31'; Sandén 44'; Fredin (yellow card) 51'; Käck (yellow card) 77'; Sandén (yellow card) 84'; Johansson (yellow card) 86'	Report	Jajic 16'	Stadium: Sollentunavallen; Referee: Arian Chalak

18 August 2021	Eskilminne	3-2	Helsingborg	Helsingborg
19:00 CEST (UTC+2)	Getachew 41' 73'; Åberg 75'; Åberg (yellow card) 85'	Report	Van den Hurk 45'; Karjalainen 47'	Stadium: Harlyckans IP; Attendance: 1,102; Referee: Kaspar Sjöberg

18 August 2021	Brommapojkarna	2-1	Östersund	Stockholm
19:00 CEST (UTC+2)	Leach Holm 15'; Ceesay (yellow card) 40'; Frej 70'; Falkeborn (yellow card) 90+1'	Report	Stolt 12'; Arhin (yellow card) 26'	Stadium: Grimsta IP; Referee: Rambod Beigi

19 August 2021	Täby	2-3	Sirius	Täby
18:30 CEST (UTC+2)	Aguirre 60'; Hagman 80'	Report	Roche 58'; Ståhl (yellow card) 70'; Unknown 75' (o.g.); Sylisufaj 90+3'	Stadium: Tibblevallen; Referee: Pontus Olofsson

19 August 2021	Rågsved	0-5	AIK	Stockholm
18:30 CEST (UTC+2)	Notice (yellow card) 44'; Pidre (yellow card) 47'; Bazoukou (yellow card) 85'	Report	Radulović 3'; Ayari 18'; Karlsson (yellow card) 27'; Ring 60' 66'; Elbouzedi 72'	Stadium: Hagsätra Idrottsplats; Referee: Farouk Nehdi

26 August 2021	Umeå	0-1	Sundsvall	Umeå
19:00 CEST (UTC+2)	Yeboah (yellow card) 71'; Abrahamsson (yellow card) 87'	Report	Palmlöv 16'; Lundström (yellow card) 40'	Stadium: Umeå Energi Arena; Referee: Henrik Mohlin

1 September 2021	Sandviken	0-1	Örebro	Sandviken
18:30 CEST (UTC+2)		Report	Friday 60'; Wright (yellow card) 67'; Almebäck (yellow card) 89'	Stadium: Jernvallen; Referee: Arian Chalak

9 October 2021	Viken	0-5	Landskrona	Åmål
16:00 CEST (UTC+2)	Eriksson (yellow card) 60'	Report	Asp 30'; Nielsen 45+2' 90+2'; Blixt 52'; Olsson (yellow card) 53'; Andersson 64'	Stadium: Rösvallen; Referee: Dino Demo

13 October 2021	Stockholm Internazionale	0-3	Elfsborg	Stockholm
18:00 CEST (UTC+2)	Diallo (yellow card) 32'; Rajalakso (yellow card) 71'; Talebi (yellow card) 85'	Report	Ondrejka 9' 47'; Frick 34'; Söderberg (yellow card) 54'	Stadium: Kristinebergs IP; Referee: Fredrik Hansson

13 October 2021	Malmö FF	5-1	Onsala	Malmö
20:00 CEST (UTC+2)	Čolak 9' 19' 67'; Birmančević (yellow card) 14' (goal) 48'; Abubakari 53'	Report	Nogueira (yellow card) 12'; Andersson 41'; Lundgren (yellow card) 83'	Stadium: Eleda Stadion; Referee: Adi Aganovic

20 October 2021	Hudiksvall	1-3	Hammarby	Hudiksvall
17:00 CEST (UTC+2)	Zerai (yellow card) 76'; Wickman 79'; Bergquist (yellow card) 90+4'	Report	Ouattara (yellow card) 30'; Rodić 64'; Lahdo 87' 90'	Stadium: Glysisvallen; Attendance: 637; Referee: Henrik Mohlin

== Group stage ==
The group stage was drawn on 5 December 2021. The 32 winners from round 2 were divided into eight groups of four teams. The 16 highest ranked winners from the previous rounds were seeded to the top two positions in each group and the 16 remaining winners went unseeded in the draw. The ranking of the 16 seeded teams was decided by league position in the 2021 season. All teams in the group stage played each other once, the highest-ranked teams from the previous rounds and teams from tier three or lower played two home matches.

=== Qualified teams ===
Seeded

- AIK (1)
- BK Häcken (1)
- Degerfors IF (1)
- Djurgårdens IF (1)
- Halmstads BK (1)
- Hammarby IF (1)
- IF Elfsborg (1)
- IFK Göteborg (1)
- IFK Norrköping (1)
- IK Sirius (1)
- Kalmar FF (1)
- Malmö FF (1)
- Mjällby AIF (1)
- Varbergs BoIS (1)
- Örebro SK (1)
- IFK Värnamo (2)

Unseeded

- Akropolis IF (2)
- Falkenbergs FF (2)
- GAIS (2)
- GIF Sundsvall (2)
- IK Brage (2)
- Landskrona BoIS (2)
- Trelleborgs FF (2)
- Örgryte IS (2)
- Östers IF (2)
- IF Brommapojkarna (3)
- IF Sylvia (3)
- Sollentuna FK (3)
- Eskilsminne IF (4)
- Skiljebo SK (4)
- Ytterhogdals IK (4)
- Ängelholms FF (4)

Akropolis IF withdrew from the competition and was replaced by Norrby IF.

=== Group 1 ===
Pos	Team	Pld	W	D	L	GF	GA	GD	Pts	Qualification	MFF	IFKV	GAIS	ÄFF
1	Malmö FF	3	3	0	0	12	2	+10	9	Advance to Knockout Stage		2–0	5–1	
2	IFK Värnamo	3	2	0	1	3	3	0	6				1–0	
3	GAIS	3	1	0	2	2	6	−4	3					1–0
4	Ängelholms FF	3	0	0	3	2	8	−6	0		1–5	1–2		

Updated to match(es) played on unknown. Source: Swedish Football Association
Rules for classification: 1) Points; 2) Goal difference; 3) Goals scored; 4) Head-to-head record; 5) Lowest disciplinary points; 6) Highest ranked team

20 February 2022 Matchday 1	Ängelholms FF (4)	1-2	IFK Värnamo (1)	Ängelholm
15:00	Lipovica 88'	Report	Antonsson 21'; Avdiu 60'	Stadium: Ängelholms IP; Attendance: TBA; Referee: Kristoffer Karlsson

20 February 2022 Matchday 1	Malmö FF (1)	5-1	GAIS (3)	Malmö
15:15	Birmančević 9', 12', 16'; Christiansen 38'; Abubakari 83'	Report	Lundgren 34'	Stadium: Malmö IP; Attendance: 3,300; Referee: Fredrik Klitte

26 February 2022 Matchday 2	IFK Värnamo (1)	1-0	GAIS (3)	Värnamo
13:00	Antonsson 48'	Report		Stadium: Finnvedsvallen; Referee: Oscar Johnson

26 February 2022 Matchday 2	Ängelholms FF (4)	1-5	Malmö FF (1)	Ängelholm
15:15	Oremo 29'	Report	Nalic 48'; Birmančević 63'; Abubakari 87'; Larsson 89'; Christiansen 90+3'	Stadium: Ängelholms IP; Referee: Kaspar Sjöberg

5 March 2022 Matchday 3	GAIS (3)	1-0	Ängelholms FF (4)	Gothenburg
17:30	Kargbo 25'	Report		Stadium: Gamla Ullevi; Attendance: 479; Referee: Magnus Lindgren

5 March 2022 Matchday 3	Malmö FF (1)	2-0	IFK Värnamo (1)	Malmö
17:30	Birmančević 25'; Berget 36'	Report		Stadium: Eleda Stadion; Referee: Kristoffer Karlsson

=== Group 2 ===
Pos	Team	Pld	W	D	L	GF	GA	GD	Pts	Qualification	AIK	EIF	ÖIS	ÖSK
1	AIK	3	2	1	0	7	1	+6	7	Advance to Knockout Stage			2–0	1–1
2	Eskilsminne IF	3	1	1	1	1	4	−3	4		0–4			0–0
3	Örgryte IS	3	1	0	2	3	4	−1	3			0–1		
4	Örebro SK	3	0	2	1	2	4	−2	2				1–3	

Updated to match(es) played on unknown. Source: Swedish Football Association
Rules for classification: 1) Points; 2) Goal difference; 3) Goals scored; 4) Head-to-head record; 5) Lowest disciplinary points; 6) Highest ranked team

19 February 2022 Matchday 1	AIK (1)	2-0	Örgryte IS (2)	Solna
15:15	Bahoui 41', 60'	Report		Stadium: Skytteholms IP; Attendance: 4,249; Referee: Victor Wolf

20 February 2022 Matchday 1	Eskilsminne IF (4)	0-0	Örebro SK (1)	Helsingborg
13:00		Report		Stadium: Olympiafältet; Referee: Kaspar Sjöberg

27 February 2022 Matchday 2	Örebro SK (1)	1-3	Örgryte IS (2)	Örebro
15:00	Ekani 39'	Report	O Johansson 9'; Brorsson 50'; Browning-Lagerfeldt 90+3'	Stadium: Behrn Arena; Attendance: 1,420; Referee: Mohammed Al-Hakim

27 February 2022 Matchday 2	Eskilsminne IF (4)	0-4	AIK (1)	Helsingborg
15:15		Report	Bahoui 3', 5'; Elbouzedi 25'; Meja 87'	Stadium: Olympiafältet; Referee: Kristoffer Karlsson

7 March 2022 Matchday 3	Örgryte IS (2)	0-1	Eskilsminne IF (4)	Gothenburg
19:00		Report	Stoltz 57'	Stadium: Valhalla IP; Attendance: 792; Referee: Oscar Johnson

7 March 2022 Matchday 3	AIK (1)	1-1	Örebro SK (1)	Solna
19:00	Larsson 8'	Report	Larsson 87'	Stadium: Skytteholms IP; Attendance: 3,927; Referee: Glenn Nyberg

=== Group 3 ===
Pos	Team	Pld	W	D	L	GF	GA	GD	Pts	Qualification	DIF	BP	IKB	HBK
1	Djurgårdens IF	3	2	1	0	5	1	+4	7	Advance to Knockout Stage			1–0	1–1
2	IF Brommapojkarna	3	1	1	1	3	5	−2	4		0–3			1–1
3	IK Brage	3	1	0	2	2	3	−1	3			1–2		
4	Halmstads BK	3	0	2	1	2	3	−1	2				0–1	

Updated to match(es) played on unknown. Source: Swedish Football Association
Rules for classification: 1) Points; 2) Goal difference; 3) Goals scored; 4) Head-to-head record; 5) Lowest disciplinary points; 6) Highest ranked team

21 February 2022 Matchday 1	Djurgårdens IF (1)	1-0	IK Brage (2)	Stockholm
19:00	Edvardsen 77'	Report		Stadium: Tele2 Arena; Attendance: 6,559; Referee: Mohammed Al-Hakim

22 February 2022 Matchday 1	IF Brommapojkarna (3)	1-1	Halmstads BK (1)	Vällingby
12:00	Hellquist 68'	Report	Lundevall 49'	Stadium: Grimsta IP; Attendance: 50; Referee: Adam Ladebäck

27 February 2022 Matchday 2	IF Brommapojkarna (3)	0-3	Djurgårdens IF (1)	Vällingby
13:00		Report	Edvardsen 1'; Sögaard 41' (o.g.); Schüller 45+2'	Stadium: Grimsta IP; Attendance: 1,536; Referee: Joakim Östling

27 February 2022 Matchday 2	Halmstads BK (1)	0-1	IK Brage (2)	Halmstad
13:00		Report	Karlberg 89' (pen.)	Stadium: Örjans Vall; Attendance: 496; Referee: Fredrik Oppong

5 March 2022 Matchday 3	IK Brage (2)	1-2	IF Brommapojkarna (3)	Borlänge
13:00	Karlberg 41' (pen.)	Report	Deprem 15'; Jelassi 34'	Stadium: Domnarvsvallen; Attendance: 37; Referee: Fredrik Hansson

5 March 2022 Matchday 3	Djurgårdens IF (1)	1-1	Halmstads BK (1)	Stockholm
13:00	Johansson 63'	Report	Alexander Johansson 84'	Stadium: Tele2 Arena; Attendance: 7,097; Referee: Victor Wolf

=== Group 4 ===
Pos	Team	Pld	W	D	L	GF	GA	GD	Pts	Qualification	IFE	DIF	GIF	SSK
1	IF Elfsborg	3	3	0	0	16	4	+12	9	Advance to Knockout Stage		5–1	3–2	
2	Degerfors IF	3	2	0	1	11	7	+4	6				4–1	
3	GIF Sundsvall	3	1	0	2	7	8	−1	3					4–1
4	Skiljebo SK	3	0	0	3	3	18	−15	0		1–8	1–6		

Updated to match(es) played on unknown. Source: Swedish Football Association
Rules for classification: 1) Points; 2) Goal difference; 3) Goals scored; 4) Head-to-head record; 5) Lowest disciplinary points; 6) Highest ranked team

19 February 2022 Matchday 1	IF Elfsborg (1)	3-2	GIF Sundsvall (2)	Borås
15:00	Ondrejka 29'; Larsson 80'; Rømer 90+3'	Report	Engblom 72', 83'	Stadium: Borås Arena; Attendance: 1,023; Referee: Joakim Östling

19 February 2022 Matchday 1	Skiljebo SK (4)	1-6	Degerfors IF (1)	Västerås
15:00	Deighton 31'	Report	Campos 20' (pen.), 84'; Vukojević 37', 60'; Saidi 69'; Djurdjic 80'	Stadium: Hamre IP; Attendance: 400; Referee: Enzo Vesprini

27 February 2022 Matchday 2	Skiljebo SK (4)	1-8	IF Elfsborg (1)	Västerås
17:00	Flytström 89'	Report	Guðjohnsen 1', 50'; Lagerbielke 12'; Qasem 16'; Ondrejka 53'; Bernhardsson 65'; Aga 83'; Alm 87'	Stadium: Hamre IP; Attendance: 252; Referee: Richard Sundell

27 February 2022 Matchday 2	Degerfors IF (1)	4-1	GIF Sundsvall (2)	Degerfors
17:30	Đurđić 22' (pen.); Bertilsson 27' (pen.), 89' (pen.); Campos 54'	Report	Carström 45+1'	Stadium: Stora Valla; Attendance: 200; Referee: Bojan Pandžić

6 March 2022 Matchday 3	GIF Sundsvall (2)	4-1	Skiljebo SK (4)	Sundsvall
15:15	Ylätupa 50'; Engblom 60'; Pichkah 75'; Burman 90+1'	Report	Deighton 36'	Stadium: NP3 Arena; Attendance: 160; Referee: Martin Strömbergsson

6 March 2022 Matchday 3	IF Elfsborg (1)	5-1	Degerfors IF (1)	Borås
15:15	Larsson 2'; Okkels 5'; Frick 66'; Bernhardsson 82'; Alm 88'	Report	Đurđić 31'	Stadium: Borås Arena; Attendance: 1,512; Referee: Granit Maqedonci

=== Group 5 ===
Pos	Team	Pld	W	D	L	GF	GA	GD	Pts	Qualification	HIF	BKH	FFF	YIK
1	Hammarby IF	3	3	0	0	12	2	+10	9	Advance to Knockout Stage		4–0	2–1	
2	BK Häcken	3	2	0	1	18	4	+14	6				5–0	
3	Falkenbergs FF	3	1	0	2	3	7	−4	3					2–0
4	Ytterhogdals IK	3	0	0	3	1	21	−20	0		1–6	0–13		

Updated to match(es) played on unknown. Source: Swedish Football Association
Rules for classification: 1) Points; 2) Goal difference; 3) Goals scored; 4) Head-to-head record; 5) Lowest disciplinary points; 6) Highest ranked team

20 February 2022 Matchday 1	Ytterhogdals IK (4)	0-13	BK Häcken (1)	Ånge
17:00		Report	Traore 5', 21'; Uddenäs 8', 14'; Hovland 10'; Berggren 18', 42', 69', 83'; Trpcevski 65'; Friðriksson 77'; Tuominen 87'; Bengtsson 90'	Stadium: Ånge IP; Referee: Martin Strömbergsson

20 February 2022 Matchday 1	Hammarby IF (1)	2-1	Falkenbergs FF (2)	Stockholm
17:30	Ludwigson 33'; Magyar 36'	Report	Ärlig 54'	Stadium: Tele2 Arena; Attendance: 14,153; Referee: Tess Olofsson

26 February 2022 Matchday 2	BK Häcken (1)	5-0	Falkenbergs FF (2)	Gothenburg
13:00	Hovland 11'; Uddenäs 25'; Traore 33'; Berggren 42'; Hammar 80'	Report		Stadium: Bravida Arena; Attendance: 873; Referee: Magnus Lindgren

26 February 2022 Matchday 2	Ytterhogdals IK (4)	1-6	Hammarby IF (1)	Ytterhogdal
17:30	Surkka 53'	Report	Nilsson 13'; Selmani 26', 50' (pen.), 61'; Magyar 43'; Lahdo 84' (pen.)	Stadium: Svedjevallen; Referee: Glenn Nyberg

6 March 2022 Matchday 3	Falkenbergs FF (2)	2-0	Ytterhogdals IK (4)	Falkenberg
13:00	Eliasson-Hofsö 80'; Hintsa 87'	Report		Stadium: Falcon Alkoholfri Arena; Attendance: 150; Referee: Fredrik Oppong

6 March 2022 Matchday 3	Hammarby IF (1)	4-0	BK Häcken (1)	Stockholm
13:00	Bojanić 38'; Tebo 45' (o.g.); Andersen 60'; Paulsen 90+4'	Report		Stadium: Tele2 Arena; Attendance: 14,820; Referee: Adam Ladebäck

=== Group 6 ===
Pos	Team	Pld	W	D	L	GF	GA	GD	Pts	Qualification	KFF	IKS	TFF	IFS
1	Kalmar FF	3	3	0	0	6	1	+5	9	Advance to Knockout Stage		2–0	2–1	
2	IK Sirius	3	1	1	1	5	4	+1	4				2–2	
3	Trelleborgs FF	3	0	2	1	3	4	−1	2					0–0
4	IF Sylvia	3	0	1	2	0	5	−5	1		0–2	0–3		

Updated to match(es) played on unknown. Source: Swedish Football Association
Rules for classification: 1) Points; 2) Goal difference; 3) Goals scored; 4) Head-to-head record; 5) Lowest disciplinary points; 6) Highest ranked team

20 February 2022 Matchday 1	Kalmar FF (1)	2-1	Trelleborgs FF (2)	Kalmar
13:00	O. Berg 28'; Sachpekidis 78'	Report	Jönsson 27'	Stadium: Guldfågeln Arena; Referee: Per Melin

20 February 2022 Matchday 1	IF Sylvia (3)	0-3	IK Sirius (1)	Norrköping
13:00		Report	Kouakou 34'; Olsson 41'; Björkström 57'	Stadium: PlatinumCars Arena; Referee: Bojan Pandžić

27 February 2022 Matchday 2	IF Sylvia (3)	0-2	Kalmar FF (1)	Norrköping
13:00		Report	Lindahl 15'; Netabay 90+3'	Stadium: PlatinumCars Arena; Attendance: 220; Referee: Andreas Dufva-Johansson

27 February 2022 Matchday 2	IK Sirius (1)	2-2	Trelleborgs FF (2)	Uppsala
13:00	Kouakou 21', 75'	Report	Saeid 71' (pen.); Offia 80'	Stadium: Studenternas IP; Attendance: 891; Referee: Tess Olofsson

6 March 2022 Matchday 3	Trelleborgs FF (2)	0-0	IF Sylvia (3)	Trelleborg
17:30		Report		Stadium: Vångavallen; Referee: Fredrik Klitte

6 March 2022 Matchday 3	Kalmar FF (1)	2-0	IK Sirius (1)	Kalmar
17:30	Netabay 51'; Berg 71'	Report		Stadium: Guldfågeln Arena; Referee: Andreas Ekberg

=== Group 7 ===
Pos	Team	Pld	W	D	L	GF	GA	GD	Pts	Qualification	IFKN	VAR	ÖIF	SFK
1	IFK Norrköping	3	2	1	0	7	2	+5	7	Advance to Knockout Stage		2–1	1–1	
2	Varbergs BoIS	3	2	0	1	3	2	+1	6				1–0	
3	Östers IF	3	0	2	1	2	3	−1	2					1–1
4	Sollentuna FK	3	0	1	2	1	6	−5	1		0–4	0–1		

Updated to match(es) played on unknown. Source: Swedish Football Association
Rules for classification: 1) Points; 2) Goal difference; 3) Goals scored; 4) Head-to-head record; 5) Lowest disciplinary points; 6) Highest ranked team

19 February 2022 Matchday 1	Sollentuna FK (3)	0-1	Varbergs BoIS (1)	Vällingby
13:00		Report	Matthews 58'	Stadium: Grimsta IP; Referee: Fredrik Hansson

19 February 2022 Matchday 1	IFK Norrköping (1)	1-1	Östers IF (2)	Norrköping
17:30	Ortmark 5'	Report	Bonnah 88'	Stadium: PlatinumCars Arena; Attendance: 1,560; Referee: Richard Sundell

28 February 2022 Matchday 2	Sollentuna FK (3)	0-4	IFK Norrköping (1)	Vällingby
19:00		Report	Nyman 15' (pen.); Levi 28'; Jean 35'; Wahlqvist 80'	Stadium: Grimsta IP; Attendance: 200; Referee: Adam Ladebäck

28 February 2022 Matchday 2	Varbergs BoIS (1)	1-0	Östers IF (2)	Varberg
19:00	Adjei 90+2'	Report		Stadium: Varberg Energi Arena; Attendance: 308; Referee: Granit Maqedonci

5 March 2022 Matchday 3	Östers IF (2)	1-1	Sollentuna FK (3)	Växjö
15:15	Sørensen 21' (pen.)	Report	Dejene Öhman 68'	Stadium: Visma Arena; Attendance: 325; Referee: Adi Aganovic

5 March 2022 Matchday 3	IFK Norrköping (1)	2-1	Varbergs BoIS (1)	Norrköping
15:15	Nyman 67', 87'	Report	Birkfeldt 39'	Stadium: PlatinumCars Arena; Attendance: 2,165; Referee: Mohammed Al-Hakim

=== Group 8 ===
Pos	Team	Pld	W	D	L	GF	GA	GD	Pts	Qualification	IFKG	NIF	MAIF	LAN
1	IFK Göteborg	3	1	2	0	5	3	+2	5	Advance to Knockout stage			2–2	2–0
2	Norrby IF	3	1	2	0	4	2	+2	5		1–1			
3	Mjällby AIF	3	0	3	0	3	3	0	3			0–0		1–1
4	Landskrona BoIS	3	0	1	2	2	6	−4	1			1–3		

Source: Swedish Football Association
Rules for classification: 1) Points; 2) Goal difference; 3) Goals scored; 4) Head-to-head record; 5) Lowest disciplinary points; 6) Highest ranked team

20 February 2022 Matchday 1	IFK Göteborg (1)	2-0	Landskrona BoIS (2)	Gothenburg
13:00	Wendt 43'; Vilhelmsson 48'	Report		Stadium: Gamla Ullevi; Attendance: 2,553; Referee: Granit Maqedonci

20 February 2022 Matchday 1	Mjällby AIF (1)	0-0	Norrby IF (2)	Hällevik
13:00		Report		Stadium: Strandvallen; Attendance: Andreas Ekberg; Referee: TBA

26 February 2022 Matchday 2	Norrby IF (2)	1-1	IFK Göteborg (1)	Borås
13:00	Osmanagic 90+1'	Report	Salomonsson 49'	Stadium: Borås Arena; Attendance: 2,043; Referee: Victor Wolf

26 February 2022 Matchday 2	Mjällby AIF (1)	1-1	Landskrona BoIS (2)	Hällevik
13:00	Moros 21'	Report	Ottosson 90'	Stadium: Strandvallen; Attendance: 320; Referee: Fredrik Klitte

6 March 2022 Matchday 3	Landskrona BoIS (2)	1-3	Norrby IF (2)	Landskrona
13:00	Heier 10' (pen.)	Report	Bulut 38'; Sivodedov 63' (pen.); Brannefalk 78'	Stadium: Landskrona IP; Attendance: 290; Referee: Kaspar Sjöberg

6 March 2022 Matchday 3	IFK Göteborg (1)	2-2	Mjällby AIF (1)	Gothenburg
13:00	Berg 16'; Wendt 85'	Report	Moro 20'; Moros 45+1'	Stadium: Gamla Ullevi; Attendance: 2,517; Referee: Joakim Östling

== Knockout stage ==
The draw for the quarter-finals and semi-finals was made on March 7, 2022.

=== Qualified teams ===
Pos	Grp	Team	Pld	W	D	L	GF	GA	GD	Pts	Qualification
1	4	IF Elfsborg	3	3	0	0	16	4	+12	9	Seeded in Quarter-final draw
2	1	Malmö FF	3	3	0	0	12	2	+10	9	Seeded in Quarter-final draw
3	5	Hammarby IF	3	3	0	0	12	2	+10	9	Seeded in Quarter-final draw
4	6	Kalmar FF	3	3	0	0	6	1	+5	9	Seeded in Quarter-final draw
5	2	AIK	3	2	1	0	7	1	+6	7	Unseeded in Quarter-final draw
6	7	IFK Norrköping	3	2	1	0	7	2	+5	7	Unseeded in Quarter-final draw
7	3	Djurgårdens IF	3	2	1	0	5	1	+4	7	Unseeded in Quarter-final draw
8	8	IFK Göteborg	3	1	2	0	5	3	+2	5	Unseeded in Quarter-final draw

Updated to match(es) played on 7 March 2022. Source: Group results
Rules for classification: 1) Points; 2) Goal difference; 3) Goals scored; 4) Ranking in 2021 season

=== Bracket ===
Quarter-finals
13 March 2022 – Stockholm
Hammarby	3
IFK Norrköping	2
13 March 2022 – Borås
IF Elfsborg	1
IFK Göteborg	0
12 March 2022 – Kalmar
Kalmar FF	0
Djurgårdens IF	2
14 March 2022 – Malmö
Malmö FF (a.e.t.)	3
AIK	2

Semi-finals
19 March 2022 – Stockholm
Hammarby	1
IF Elfsborg	0
20 March 2022 – Stockholm
Djurgårdens IF	0
Malmö FF	1

Final
26 May 2022 – Stockholm
Hammarby	0 (3)
Malmö FF (p)	0 (4)

=== Quarter-finals ===
12 March 2022 Quarter-Final	Kalmar FF	0–2	Djurgårdens IF	Kalmar
13:00		Report	Radetinac 31'; Johansson 36'	Stadium: Guldfågeln Arena; Referee: Kaspar Sjöberg

13 March 2022 Quarter-Final	IF Elfsborg	1–0	IFK Göteborg	Borås
13:30	Ondrejka 65'	Report		Stadium: Borås Arena; Attendance: 5,293; Referee: Glenn Nyberg

13 March 2022 Quarter-Final	Hammarby	3–2	IFK Norrköping	Stockholm
16:30	Besara 42'; Bojanić 50'; Selmani 57' (pen.)	Report	Nyman 17', 20'	Stadium: Tele2 Arena; Attendance: 15,759; Referee: Kristoffer Karlsson

14 March 2022 Quarter-Final	Malmö FF	3–2 (a.e.t.)	AIK	Malmö
19:00	Nanasi 57'; Moisander 72'; Birmančević 105' (pen.)	Report	Bahoui 51', 75'	Stadium: Malmö IP; Attendance: 3,290; Referee: Adam Ladebäck

=== Semi-finals ===
19 March 2022 Semi-Final	Hammarby	1–0	IF Elfsborg	Stockholm
16:00	Besara 27'	Report		Stadium: Tele2 Arena; Attendance: 22,737; Referee: Fredrik Klitte

20 March 2022 Semi-Final	Djurgårdens IF	0–1	Malmö FF	Stockholm
14:00		Report	Kiese Thelin 33'	Stadium: Tele2 Arena; Attendance: 16,511; Referee: Mohammed Al-Hakim

=== Final ===
26 May 2022
15:00 CEST
Final

Hammarby IF	0–0 (a.e.t.)	Malmö FF
	Report
Penalties
Besara (penalty missed); Fenger (penalty scored); Trawally (penalty scored); Khalili (penalty scored); Selmani (penalty missed)	3–4	(penalty missed) Peña; (penalty scored) Birmančević; (penalty scored) Berget; (penalty scored) Olsson; (penalty scored) Toivonen

Tele2 Arena, Stockholm
Attendance: 29,214
Referee: Andreas Ekberg

== Top scorers ==
As of 26 May 2022

Rank	Player	Club	Goals
1	(Serbia) Veljko Birmančević	Malmö	7
2	(Sweden) Nabil Bahoui	AIK	6
2	(Ivory Coast) Bénie Traoré	Häcken	6
4	(Sweden) Christoffer Nyman	Norrköping	5
4	(Sweden) Jacob Ondrejka	Elfsborg	5
6	(Sweden) Sargon Abraham	Degerfors	4
6	(Sweden) Gustav Berggren	Häcken	4
6	(Sweden) Villiam Dahlström	Degerfors	4
6	(Kosovo) Astrit Selmani	Hammarby	4
