= Pashang Abdulla =

Iraqi footballer (born 1994)

Personal information
- Date of birth: 29 May 1994 (age 32)
- Place of birth: Erbil, Iraq
- Height: 1.84 m (6 ft 0 in)
- Position: Centre-forward

Team information
- Current team: Duhok
- Number: 11

Senior career*
Years	Team	Apps	(Gls)
2014	Värmdö IF	26	(6)
2015	IFK Stockholm	18	(6)
2016	Spårvägens FF	7	(3)
2017–2018	IFK Aspudden-Tellus	47	(18)
2019	Karlbergs BK	24	(26)
2020	Sollentuna FK	0	(0)
2020	IFK Haninge	14	(5)
2021	Piteå IF	30	(20)
2022	Dalkurd FF	25	(8)
2023	Jönköpings Södra IF	12	(8)
2023–2024	Degerfors IF	21	(5)
2024–2026	Duhok	45	(7)

International career^{‡}
2023	Iraq	3	(0)
- * Club domestic league appearances and goals as of 14 February 2026 ‡ National team caps and goals as of 1 April 2024

Pashang Abdulla (Sorani Kurdish: پاشەنگ عەبدوڵڵا; born 29 May 1994) is an Iraqi Kurdish professional footballer who plays as a centre-forward for Iraq Stars League club Duhok SC and the Iraq national team.

== Club career ==
Abdulla started his senior playing career at the age of 14, as he went on to feature for several teams from the Stockholm metropolitan area, before joining Karlbergs BK for the 2019 season.

Having scored 26 goals in 24 matches for the side, Abdulla joined IFK Haninge for the 2020 season. However, due to injuries, he scored just five goals in 14 matches, and was released at the end of the year.

On 19 January 2021, Abdulla officially signed for newly promoted Ettan Norra side Piteå IF, penning his first full-time professional contract. On 11 October, he scored all of his side's goals in a 4–4 league draw against Umeå FC. Throughout the 2021 season, he established himself as one of the best players in the Swedish third tier, eventually becoming Ettan Norra's joint top scorer for the year (together with Rodin Deprem).

In January 2022, Abdulla joined newly promoted Superettan side Dalkurd FF.

On 6 February 2023, he officially signed for fellow second-tier club Jönköpings Södra IF. Throughout the first half of the 2023 season, the striker rose to prominence as one of the league's best performers, having scored eight goals in 12 matches.

On 6 July 2023, Abdulla officially joined Allsvenskan side Degerfors IF for an undisclosed fee, signing a contract until the end of 2025 with the club. Two days later, he made his top-tier debut, starting and playing full 90 minutes in a 2–1 league win over Brommapojkarna. The forward stayed with Degerfors IF following their relegation at the end of the 2024 season; however, he terminated his contract with the club by mutual consent on 21 May 2024, after falling out with manager William Lundin.

On 24 July 2024, Abdulla joined Iraq Stars League club Duhok on a free transfer.

== International career ==
After going through the bureaucratic process to obtain his Iraqi citizenship, in June 2023 Abdulla received his first call-up to the Iraq senior national team by head coach Jesús Casas. He then made his full international debut on 16 June, starting in a friendly match against Colombia, which ended in a 1–0 loss.

== Personal life ==
Born in Iraqi Kurdistan, but raised in Stockholm, Sweden, Abdulla worked as a teacher while playing part-time football during the first part of his career; he eventually quit his job after signing his first full-time deal with Piteå IF.

== Honours ==
Duhok

- Iraq FA Cup: 2024–25
- AGCFF Gulf Club Champions League: 2024–25

Individual

- Ettan Norra top scorer: 2021
