= Eric Larsson =

Swedish footballer

Personal information
- Full name: Jan Eric Anton Larsson
- Date of birth: 15 July 1991 (age 35)
- Place of birth: Gävle, Sweden
- Height: 1.75 m (5 ft 9 in)
- Position: Right-back

Team information
- Current team: Gefle IF
- Number: 2

Youth career
- –2010: Gävle GIK

Senior career*
Years	Team	Apps	(Gls)
2010–2012	Gefle IF	36	(1)
2013–2017	GIF Sundsvall	125	(5)
2018–2022	Malmö	116	(5)
2022–2024	OFI	55	(3)
2024–2025	Lillestrøm	34	(1)
2026–	Gefle IF	17	(2)

International career^{‡}
2006	Sweden U17	4	(0)
- * Club domestic league appearances and goals as of 16 November 2026 ‡ National team caps and goals as of 10 November 2017

Jan Eric Anton Larsson (born 15 July 1991) is a Swedish professional footballer who plays as a right-back for Gefle IF.

== Career ==
=== GIF Sundsvall ===
Eric Larsson played five seasons for GIF Sundsvall. In 2017 he earned a nomination for Allsvenskan defender of the year.

=== Malmö FF ===
After the expiration of Larsson's contract with GIF Sundsvall, it was announced on 9 November 2017 that he had signed a four-year contract with Swedish champions Malmö FF.

=== Lillestrøm ===
In April 2024, Larsson joined Norwegian Eliteserien club Lillestrøm on a contract until the 2025 season.

== Career statistics ==
As of 8 December 2021

Club	Season	League			Cup		Continental		Total	
Club	Season	Division	Apps	Goals	Apps	Goals	Apps	Goals	Apps	Goals
Gefle IF	2010	Allsvenskan	2	0	0	0	2	0	4	0
Gefle IF	2011	Allsvenskan	10	0	1	0	—		11	0
Gefle IF	2012	Allsvenskan	24	1	1	0	—		25	1
Gefle IF	Total		36	1	2	0	2	0	40	1
GIF Sundsvall	2013	Superettan	24	1	4	0	—		28	1
GIF Sundsvall	2014	Superettan	20	0	1	0	—		21	0
GIF Sundsvall	2015	Allsvenskan	24	0	1	0	—		25	0
GIF Sundsvall	2016	Allsvenskan	29	1	4	0	—		33	1
GIF Sundsvall	2017	Allsvenskan	28	3	0	0	—		28	3
GIF Sundsvall	Total		125	5	10	0	0	0	135	5
Malmö FF	2018	Allsvenskan	25	2	6	0	10	1	41	3
Malmö FF	2019	Allsvenskan	25	0	3	0	9	0	37	0
Malmö FF	2020	Allsvenskan	30	3	6	2	4	1	40	6
Malmö FF	2021	Allsvenskan	23	0	1	0	9	0	33	0
Malmö FF	Total		103	5	16	2	32	2	151	9
Career total			264	11	28	2	34	2	326	15

== Honours ==
Malmö FF

- Allsvenskan: 2020, 2021
- Svenska Cupen: 2021–22

Lillestrøm SK

- Norwegian First Division: 2025
- Norwegian Cup: 2025
