= Niklas Moisander =

Finnish footballer (born 1985)

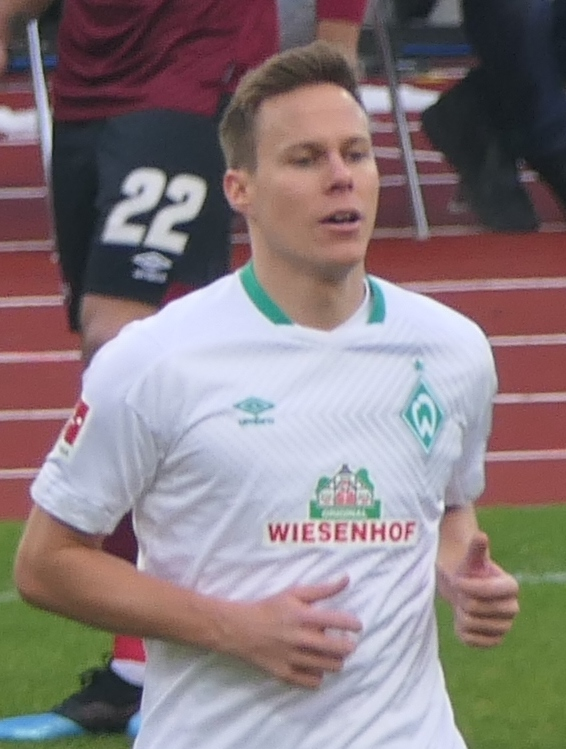
- Moisander with Werder Bremen in 2019

Personal information
- Full name: Niklas Kristian Moisander
- Date of birth: 29 September 1985 (age 41)
- Place of birth: Turku, Finland
- Height: 1.83 m (6 ft 0 in)
- Position: Centre-back

Youth career
- 1996–2002: TPS

Senior career*
Years	Team	Apps	(Gls)
2002–2003	TPS	17	(0)
2003–2006	Ajax	0	(0)
2006–2008	Zwolle	71	(5)
2008–2012	AZ Alkmaar	111	(3)
2012–2015	Ajax	77	(5)
2015–2016	Sampdoria	22	(0)
2016–2021	Werder Bremen	125	(2)
2021–2024	Malmö FF	29	(0)
Total		452	(15)

International career
2000	Finland U15	3	(1)
2001	Finland U16	12	(0)
2001–2002	Finland U17	16	(0)
2002	Finland U18	2	(0)
2002–2003	Finland U19	3	(0)
2005–2006	Finland U21	8	(1)
2008–2017	Finland	62	(2)
Medal record
Finland national football team
Third place	Baltic Cup	2014
- * Club domestic league appearances and goals

Niklas Kristian Moisander (born 29 September 1985) is a Finnish former professional footballer who played as a centre-back. Moisander was born in Turku, where he played for the local TPS youth team before moving to Ajax. He did not make any senior appearances at Ajax between 2003 and 2006 and moved to Zwolle. After two seasons in the Eerste Divisie, he signed with AZ Alkmaar of the Eredivisie where he spent five seasons. He returned to Ajax in 2012 and played for the side until 2015. Following a one-season stay at Sampdoria, he spent five years at Bundesliga club Werder Bremen. He remained at Swedish side Malmö FF for four seasons before retiring at the end of the 2024 season. He is the twin brother of goalkeeper Henrik Moisander, and is a former captain of the Finland national team.

Moisander made his international debut for Finland in May 2008, at age 22, and had 62 caps, including appearing in 2010, 2014 and 2018 FIFA World Cup qualifications before his retirement from international football in 2017. He was voted the Finnish Footballer of the Year in both 2012 and 2013.

== Club career ==
=== TPS ===
Moisander started his football career together with his twin brother Henrik, both joining local TPS from their home town of Turku in 2001. A year later, he made his debut in the Veikkausliiga, the premier division of Football in Finland, under then manager Mika Laurikainen. He was selected in the starting lineup on 15 May 2003 in a regular season's fixture against cross town rivals Inter Turku. He played the full 90 minutes in the 2–0 away win in his first Turku derby match. He went on to make 17 appearances for TPS during the 2002 and 2003 seasons, becoming a regular with his home club at age 17.

=== Ajax ===
On 5 June 2003, it was announced that Dutch Eredivisie club Ajax had signed the twins Henrik and Niklas to a two-year contract, binding them to the club until the summer of 2005. At Ajax, they would join the team where both Finland Internationals Jari Litmanen and Petri Pasanen were playing at the time. At first instance, the twins were to join the under-19 team of Ajax A1, competing in the 2003–04 A-junioren Eredivisie league in their first year with the club. The twins helped their side secure the club's eighth A-Juniors league title, under the tutelage and guidance of then coach Danny Blind. The following season saw Moisander and his brother compete in the Beloften Eredivisie for the team's reserve squad Jong Ajax, where they would help to win the reserve league title in their first year on the team. Signing a contract extension for an additional year by the end of the season, Ajax eventually won the KNVB Cup in conclusion. Unable to break into the first team, however, after their second term with the reserves, the twins were separated; while Henrik was dispatched to Assyriska in Sweden, Niklas remained in the Netherlands, where he signed with FC Zwolle instead.

=== FC Zwolle ===
On 3 May 2006 it was announced that Moisander would transfer to the Eerste Divisie side FC Zwolle, signing a two-year contract with the club from Overijssel. He made his debut on 11 August 2006 in a 2–0 win at home against Fortuna Sittard in the KNVB Cup match, at which point he immediately establishing his position in the starting XI of the team. Midway through his first season, his contract was annulled and extended for an additional year, binding him to the club until the summer of 2009. After his first two seasons, and with one year still remaining on his contract, Zwolle and AZ Alkmaar agreed to terms for a direct transfer of Moisander for a reported €600,000 transfer fee, returning to the top flight of Dutch football. During his stay in Zwolle, he made 75 appearances for the club, scoring five times, where he was an instrumental player for his side.

=== AZ ===
On 11 July 2008, it was announced that AZ had come to terms with Zwolle for the direct transfer of Moisander, signing a three-year contract to bind him to the club until the summer of 2011. He made his Eredivisie debut on 20 September 2008 for AZ in its 1–0 home win against Dutch giants PSV. He scored his first goal for AZ on 3 October 2008 in the 6–0 regular season victory over Sparta Rotterdam. He was able to establish himself as the first choice defender under manager Louis van Gaal, playing a total of 22 full league matches, having briefly been sidelined in the months of January and February due to a knee injury.

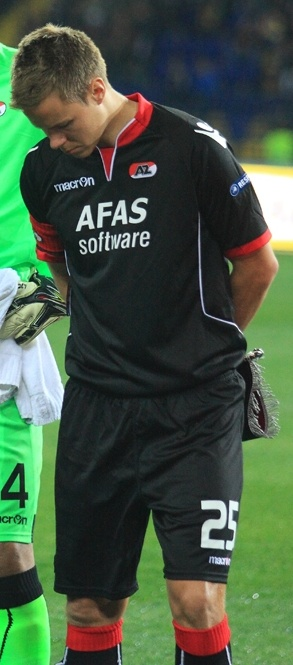
Moisander with AZ Alkmaar in 2011

Moisander quickly came back to help his side win the Eredivisie title, the second for the club in its history and Moisander's personal first. That season, the title race had come down to the final round, and although AZ had lost their last game of the season against Vitesse, it was still able to consequently clinch the league due to eminent losses suffered by title contenders Ajax and Twente. The following season, Moisander made his continental debut, playing in the 2009–10 UEFA Champions League group stage campaign. Playing in five out of the six matches against the likes of Arsenal, Olympiacos and Standard Liège, AZ finished in the bottom of the group under newly appointed manager Ronald Koeman. This was after having won the Dutch Super Cup (the Johan Cruyff Shield) against Heerenveen at the start of the season. Midway through the season, the team changed management again when Dick Advocaat was hired as a replacement for Koeman, and the club finishing the season in fifth place and thus qualifying for the 2010–11 UEFA Europa League Third qualifying round.

Ahead of the 2010–11 season, AZ had found another replacement in Gertjan Verbeek as the new manager. Moisander played a major role in helping his side to qualify for the 2010–11 Europa League group stage, having appeared in all four games in the qualifying rounds. He also played in four of the six group stage encounters against Dynamo Kyiv, BATE Borisov and Sheriff Tiraspol. The team, however, finished the league in fourth place, thus qualifying for the qualifying rounds once more.

Following the departure of Stijn Schaars to Sporting CP ahead of the 2011–12 season, Moisander was appointed as AZ's new team captain. Securing the group stage of the 2011–12 Europa League once more, through a successful qualifying campaign against Baumit Jablonec and Aalesunds FK, his team would then successfully advance out of the group stage, where it faced off with the likes of Austria Wien, Malmö FF and Metalist Kharkiv, finishing in second place in the group. The club then advanced to the quarter-finals by defeating Anderlecht and Udinese in previous rounds, eventually bowing out to Valencia 5–2 on aggregate. Moisander played in 14 matches during the club's continental campaign, when it reached the quarter-finals of the competition for the fourth time in the club's history. Moisander started the 2012–13 Eredivisie season with AZ, making two league appearances, before transferring back to neighboring Ajax.

=== Return to Ajax ===
On 21 August 2012, both clubs agreed to terms of a €4 million transfer fee to acquire Moisander, as he returned to Ajax on a three-year contract as a replacement for the Tottenham Hotspur-bound Jan Vertonghen. Moisander made his Eredivisie debut for Ajax on 25 August 2012 in a match against NAC Breda, where he also scored a goal. He established himself as the first-choice centre back under manager Frank de Boer, making a total of 29 league appearances in his first season back with the club while adding four goals. On 3 October 2012, he scored a header in a UEFA Champions League match, a 4–1 home defeat against Real Madrid. He then scored the winner in the Champions League game against Manchester City on 24 October, again with a header. Moisander played in all six matches during the clubs' 2012–13 Champions League campaign, where the club finished in third place behind Borussia Dortmund and Real Madrid, thus qualifying for the 2012–13 Europa League round of 16, where the team would suffer an early exit by a loss to Steaua București, losing 4–2 on penalties in the final match following a 2–2 deadlock. Moisander was voted Finnish Footballer of the Year by both the Football Association of Finland and the Finnish Sports' Journalists Association, as Ajax went on to win its 32nd league title in his first year back with the club.

Following an injury to Siem de Jong the following season, and after the departure of vice-captain, fellow centre back Toby Alderweireld to Atlético Madrid, Moisander wore the captain's armband for the first time for Ajax in an away match against Groningen on 1 September 2013. He played his 50th official match for Ajax on 22 September in the Topper match against rivals PSV, which ended in a 4–0 loss for Ajax. On 4 November, he made an appearance in the Eerste Divisie playing for the newly promoted reserve team Jong Ajax in its 3–2 away loss to Helmond Sport. Moisander participated in the match for 60 minutes in order to regain his form after having suffered an injury which kept him sidelined for a month.

Moisander was sent off against his former club AZ in a controversial decision. Ajax went on to lose the match 1–0.

=== Sampdoria ===
On 25 March 2015, it was announced that Moisander would move to Italian Serie A club Sampdoria at the end of the 2014–15 season. As his contract at Ajax was expiring, he moved on a free transfer, signing a three-year contract. He made his Serie A debut on 30 August 2015 in a match against Napoli when he replaced Éder as a substitute on 88th minute.

=== Werder Bremen ===
On 9 July 2016, German Bundesliga side Werder Bremen announced it had completed the signing of Moisander. The transfer fee paid to Sampdoria was a reported €1.7 million. He made his Bundesliga debut in a 4–1 loss against Borussia Mönchengladbach on 16 September 2016, replacing Fallou Diagne at half-time with Werder Bremen trailing 0–4.

On 8 July 2017, he suffered a torn muscle fibre in his right thigh playing in a friendly match against his former club Ajax Amsterdam, the match was later abandoned because Ajax player Abdelhak Nouri suffered a heart attack.

In July 2018, Moisander's contract was extended.

In July 2019, he was announced as the club's captain after Max Kruse's departure. After playing the first three league matches of the season, he suffered a thigh injury. In November, while still unable to play due to the injury, he agreed a contract extension with Werder Bremen, reportedly until 2021.

In May 2021, Werder Bremen announced that Moisander's contract would not be extended.

=== Malmö FF ===
On 1 July 2021, Moisander joined Allsvenskan side Malmö FF. He helped them win the 2021 Allsvenskan as well as the 2021–22 Svenska Cupen titles during his first year at the club.

On 28 September 2023, Moisander extended his contract with Malmö, signing a new deal until the end of 2024.

On 6 December 2024, after the 2024 Allsvenskan, Moisander announced his retirement from professional football.

== International career ==
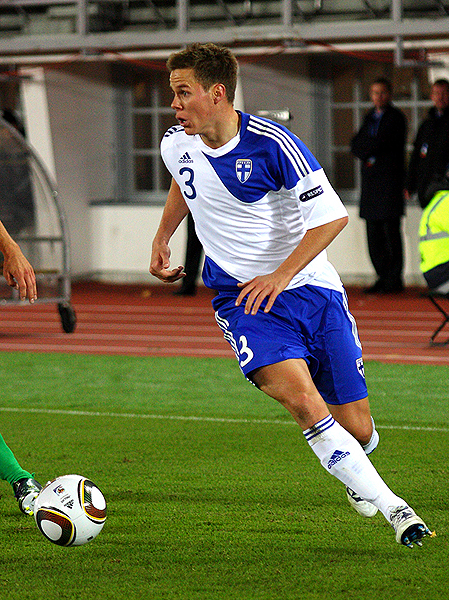
Moisander with the Finland national team in 2010

=== Youth ===
Moisander made his debut for Finland at youth level, playing for the under-15 squad at age 14 on 29 August 2000 in a friendly match against Sweden-15 in Hallstavik, Sweden. He was capped for the Finnish under-16 squad for the first time at the same age, being two years younger than most of his teammates, and was then capped for the under-17 squad for the first time at 16, being again a year younger than the rest of the team. In total, Moisander amassed three caps for the under-15 side, while scoring once, 12 caps for the under-16 squad, and eight caps for Finland U-17. At age 19 he scored a goal for the Finland U-21 in Limassol, Cyprus, in a match against Slovakia on 10 February 2005.

=== Senior ===
Moisander made his official debut for the senior team on 29 May 2008 when he was called up by head coach Stuart Baxter for a friendly match against Turkey at the age of 22, which was contested in Duisburg, Germany. In fall 2008 and spring 2009, Moisander was named for the Finland squad for the 2010 FIFA World Cup qualification matches, but remained as an unused substitute. He scored the winning goal on 10 October 2009 in a World Cup qualifier win over Wales at the Helsinki Olympic Stadium. He permanently solidified his position in the team after Baxter brought him in for the final 2010 World Cup qualifying group stage match against Russia. The match ended in a 3–0 loss for the Finns at home, which inevitably cost them the second place in the group, which was then secured by the Russians, leading to their advancement in the tournament, with Finland therefore failing to qualify for the 2010 World Cup.

In 2011, under Mixu Paatelainen, Moisander gained the captain's armband from Petri Pasanen, becoming the new skipper for Finland. While playing a major role in the teams UEFA Euro 2012 ambitions, Finland finished fourth in its group behind the Netherlands, Sweden and Hungary, failing to qualify for the final tournament in Poland and Ukraine.

The 2014 World Cup qualification process ended in a third-place group stage finish for Finland behind both Spain and France, which both secured placement in the final tournament. One of the most memorable matches of the qualification was a 1–1 draw against the reigning world and European champions Spain in March 2013 in Gijón; Moisander played full 90 minutes in the match. Moisander scored his second goal for the national team on 14 August 2013 on his old home turf Veritas Stadion in Turku in a match against Slovenia when he took Finland on a 1–0 lead in a 2–0 victory.

In November 2017, Moisander announced his retirement from international duty.

== Personal life ==
Niklas is the twin brother of Henrik, a former professional football player as well who played as a goalkeeper.

== Career statistics ==
=== Club ===
As of 6 December 2024

Appearances and goals by club, season and competition
Club	Season	League			Cup		Continental (Note: Includes UEFA Champions League and UEFA Europa League matches.)		Other		Total	
Club	Season	Division	Apps	Goals	Apps	Goals	Apps	Goals	Apps	Goals	Apps	Goals
TPS	2002	Ykkönen	8	0	0	0	—		—		8	0
TPS	2003	Veikkausliiga	9	0	0	0	—		—		9	0
TPS	Total		17	0	0	0	0	0	0	0	17	0
Ajax	2004–05	Eredivisie	0	0	0	0	0	0	0	0	0	0
Ajax	2005–06	Eredivisie	0	0	0	0	0	0	0	0	0	0
Ajax	Total		0	0	0	0	0	0	0	0	0	0
PEC Zwolle	2006–07	Eerste Divisie	34	1	1	0	—		2 (Note: Appearance in Eredivisie playoffs)	0	37	1
PEC Zwolle	2007–08	Eerste Divisie	37	4	4	0	—		5	0	46	4
PEC Zwolle	Total		71	5	5	0	0	0	7	0	83	5
AZ Alkmaar	2008–09	Eredivisie	22	1	2	0	—		0	0	24	1
AZ Alkmaar	2009–10	Eredivisie	28	1	3	0	5	0	1 (Note: Appearance in Johan Cruyff Shield)	0	37	1
AZ Alkmaar	2010–11	Eredivisie	29	0	3	0	8	0	0	0	40	0
AZ Alkmaar	2011–12	Eredivisie	30	1	5	1	14	1	0	0	49	3
AZ Alkmaar	2012–13	Eredivisie	2	0	0	0	0	0	—		2	0
AZ Alkmaar	Total		111	3	13	1	27	1	1	0	152	5
Ajax	2012–13	Eredivisie	29	4	4	0	8	2	0	0	41	6
Ajax	2013–14	Eredivisie	23	1	4	0	5	0	1	0	33	1
Ajax	2014–15	Eredivisie	25	0	0	0	5	0	1	0	31	0
Ajax	Total		77	5	8	0	18	2	2	0	105	7
Sampdoria	2015–16	Serie A	22	0	1	0	0	0	0	0	23	0
Werder Bremen	2016–17	Bundesliga	30	0	1	0	—		0	0	31	0
Werder Bremen	2017–18	Bundesliga	25	2	3	0	—		0	0	28	2
Werder Bremen	2018–19	Bundesliga	30	0	4	0	—		0	0	34	0
Werder Bremen	2019–20	Bundesliga	22	0	3	1	—		1 (Note: Appearance in Bundesliga relegation playoffs)	0	26	1
Werder Bremen	2020–21	Bundesliga	18	0	5	0	—		—		23	0
Werder Bremen	Total		125	2	16	1	0	0	1	0	142	3
Malmö FF	2021	Allsvenskan	9	0	0	0	8	0	—		17	0
Malmö FF	2022	Allsvenskan	8	0	4	0	9	1	—		21	1
Malmö FF	2023	Allsvenskan	10	0	0	0	—		—		10	0
Malmö FF	2024	Allsvenskan	2	0	0	0	0	0	–		2	0
Malmö FF	Total		29	0	4	0	17	1	0	0	50	1
Career total			452	15	47	2	62	4	11	0	572	21

=== International ===
Appearances and goals by national team and year
National team	Year	Apps	Goals
Finland	2008	2	0
Finland	2009	5	1
Finland	2010	4	0
Finland	2011	6	0
Finland	2012	2	0
Finland	2013	4	1
Finland	2014	4	0
Finland	2015	3	0
Finland	2016	3	0
Finland	2017	4	0
Total		62	2

Scores and results list Finland's goal tally first, score column indicates score after each Moisander goal.

List of international goals scored by Niklas Moisander
No.	Date	Venue	Opponent	Score	Result	Competition
1	10 October 2009	Helsinki Olympic Stadium, Helsinki, Finland	Wales	2–1	2–1	2010 FIFA World Cup qualification
2	14 August 2013	Veritas Stadion, Turku, Finland	Slovenia	1–0	2–0	Friendly

== Honours ==
AZ

- Eredivisie: 2008–09
- Johan Cruijff Shield: 2009

Ajax

- Eredivisie: 2012–13, 2013–14
- Johan Cruijff Shield: 2013

Malmö FF

- Allsvenskan: 2021, 2023, 2024
- Svenska Cupen: 2021–22

Individual

- Finnish Defence Forces Conscript Athlete of the year: 2009
- Finnish Football Association Player of the Year: 2012, 2013
- Finnish Sports’ Journalists Player of the Year: 2012, 2013
