= Henrik Moisander =

Finnish footballer (born 1985)

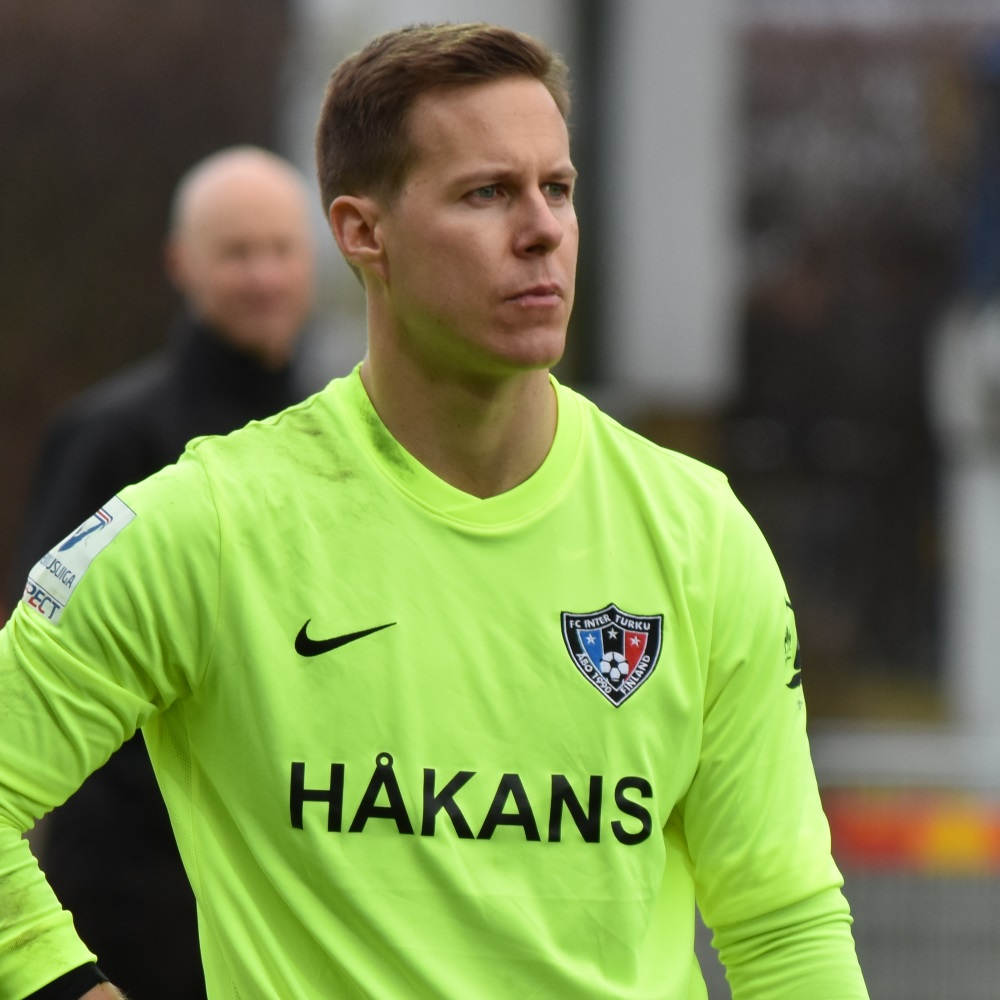

Personal information
- Date of birth: 29 September 1985 (age 41)
- Place of birth: Turku, Finland
- Height: 1.83 m (6 ft 0 in)
- Position: Goalkeeper

Youth career
- 2001–2003: TPS Turku
- 2003–2006: Ajax

Senior career*
Years	Team	Apps	(Gls)
2006–2007	Assyriska	1	(0)
2007–2008	TPS Turku	3	(0)
2009	Vaasan Palloseura	8	(0)
2010–2014	TPS Turku	60	(0)
2014–2016	FC Lahti	57	(0)
2016–2021	Inter Turku	111	(0)

International career
2015–2016	Finland	2	(0)
- * Club domestic league appearances and goals

Henrik Moisander (born 29 September 1985) is a Finnish former professional footballer.

== Career ==
Moisander began his career 2001 in the youth from TPS Turku, before 2003 joined to Ajax Amsterdam, in August 2006 left Ajax and moved to Assyriska Föreningen. He played one season with Assyriska, before being transferred to TPS Turku.

Moisander made his professional debut for TPS Turku in a league match against FC Haka on 25 June 2008. After one year he left the club for Vaasan Palloseura in November 2008. In March 2010, Moisander moved back to TPS Turku, then moved to Åbo IFK in August of that same year. Following a return to TPS in 2011, Moisander was named in the Veikkausliiga August Team of the Month, alongside teammate Jarkko Hurme.

In October 2013, Moisander joined FC Lahti, arriving alongside Jani Tanska. He made his league debut for the club on 13 April 2014 in a 1–1 away draw with MYPA, playing all ninety minutes of the match.

In February 2016, Moisander moved to FC Inter Turku. He made his league debut for the club on 9 April 2016 in a 1–1 home draw with his former club, FC Lahti.

== International ==
He has played three matches for Finland's U19 team.

== Personal life ==
He is the twin brother of Niklas Moisander.

== Honours ==
Individual

- Veikkausliiga Best Goalkeeper: 2012, 2014,
- Veikkausliiga Player of the Month: July 2014
