= Veljko Birmančević =

Serbian footballer

Personal information
- Date of birth: 5 March 1998 (age 28)
- Place of birth: Šabac, FR Yugoslavia
- Height: 1.79 m (5 ft 10 in)
- Position: Attacking midfielder

Team information
- Current team: Ferencváros

Youth career
- ŠF Stevan Ćele Vilotić
- OFK Šabac
- 2010–2016: Partizan

Senior career*
Years	Team	Apps	(Gls)
2016–2018	Partizan	3	(0)
2016–2017	→ Teleoptik (loan)	34	(5)
2018	→ Rad (loan)	11	(1)
2018–2021	Čukarički	73	(11)
2021–2022	Malmö FF	46	(14)
2022–2023	Toulouse	25	(0)
2023–2026	Sparta Prague	68	(25)
2026	→ Getafe (loan)	6	(0)
2026–	Ferencváros	7	(0)

International career^{‡}
2021–	Serbia	17	(0)
- * Club domestic league appearances and goals as of 1 November 2026 ‡ National team caps and goals as of 31 March 2026

Veljko Birmančević (Serbian Cyrillic: Вељко Бирманчевић; born 5 March 1998) is a Serbian professional footballer who plays as an attacking midfielder for Nemzeti Bajnokság I club Ferencváros and the Serbia national team.

== Club career ==
=== Partizan ===
Birmančević signed his first professional contract with Partizan on 12 February 2016, and got the jersey number 30. He made his Serbian SuperLiga debut on 21 February 2016 in a match against OFK Beograd. Later, during the spring half-season, coach Ivan Tomić used him as a back-up player in matches against Radnik Surdulica and Vojvodina. In summer 2016, Birmančević was loaned to Teleoptik, where he scored 4 goals on 22 matches in the Serbian League Belgrade for the 2016–17 season. He also extended his loan to Teleoptik for the 2017–18 Serbian First League campaign. He was sold from Malmö FF to Toulouse for a sum around €5 million.

=== Sparta Prague ===
In June 2023, Birmančević was loaned to Sparta Prague for one season with an option to buy. He signed for the club permanently on 5 March 2024, official from 1 July.

In May 2024, Birmančević helped the club to win its second championship title in two seasons and domestic cup. He was awarded as the player, midfielder and foreign player of the 2023–24 season by the League Football Association.

==== Loan to Getafe ====
On 2 February 2026, Birmančević joined La Liga club Getafe on a half-year loan deal with an option to make the transfer permanent.

=== Ferencváros ===
On 28 August 2026, Birmančević signed a contract with Nemzeti Bajnokság I club Ferencváros.

== International career ==
Birmančević was called in U18 national during the 2015, and scored one goal in a friendly match against Poland. In August 2016, he was called into the Serbia U19 squad for the memorial tournament "Stevan Vilotić – Ćele". Birmančević scored his first goal for Serbia U19 in a match against Sweden, played on 14 November 2016.

In January 2021, Birmančević was called up to the Serbian senior squad by coach Ilija Stolica. He made his debut for the team in a friendly match against the Dominican Republic on 25 January and, four days later, made his second appearance against Panama.

On 28 May 2024, Birmančević was named in the Serbia squad for UEFA Euro 2024. He appeared as a substitute for Andrija Živković in the team's opening match of the tournament against England, making his first competitive appearance for Serbia in the 1–0 defeat. He also played in group stage match against Slovenia. Serbia finished fourth in the group.

== Career statistics ==
=== Club ===
As of 27 April 2025

Appearances and goals by club, season and competition
Club	Season	League			Cup		Continental		Other		Total	
Club	Season	Division	Apps	Goals	Apps	Goals	Apps	Goals	Apps	Goals	Apps	Goals
Partizan	2015–16	Serbian SuperLiga	3	0	—		—		—		3	0
Teleoptik	2016–17	Serbian League Belgrade	22	4	—		—		—		22	4
Teleoptik	2017–18	Serbian First League	12	1	—		—		—		12	1
Teleoptik	Total		34	5	0	0	0	0	0	0	34	5
Rad	2017–18	Serbian SuperLiga	11	1	—		—		—		11	1
Čukarički	2018–19	Serbian SuperLiga	25	0	1	0	—		—		26	0
Čukarički	2019–20	Serbian SuperLiga	26	2	4	1	3 (Note: Appearances in UEFA Europa League)	1	—		33	4
Čukarički	2020–21	Serbian SuperLiga	22	9	2	2	0	0	—		24	11
Čukarički	Total		73	11	7	3	3	1	0	0	83	15
Malmö FF	2021	Allsvenskan	28	9	1	1	13 (Note: Appearances in UEFA Champions League)	4	—		42	14
Malmö FF	2022	Allsvenskan	18	5	5	6	7 (Note: Includes four appearances and two goals in UEFA Champions League and three appearances and two goals in UEFA Europa League)	4	—		30	15
Malmö FF	Total		46	14	6	7	20	8	0	0	72	29
Toulouse	2022–23	Ligue 1	25	0	5	1	—		—		30	1
Sparta Prague (loan)	2023–24	Czech First League	30	16	3	1	13 (Note: Includes two appearances and one goal in UEFA Champions League and nine appearances and three goals in UEFA Europa League)	5	—		46	22
Sparta Prague (loan)	2024–25	Czech First League	22	4	0	0	11	3	—		33	7
Sparta Prague (loan)	Total		52	20	3	1	24	8	—		79	29
Ferencváros	2026–27	Nemzeti Bajnokság I	0	0	0	0	0	0	—		0	0
Career total			244	51	21	12	47	17	0	0	311	80

=== International ===
As of 31 March 2026

Appearances and goals by national team and year
National team	Year	Apps	Goals
Serbia	2021	3	0
Serbia	2022	0	0
Serbia	2023	0	0
Serbia	2024	8	0
Serbia	2025	2	0
Serbia	2026	2	0
Total		15	0

== Honours ==
Partizan

- Serbian Cup: 2015–16

Teleoptik

- Serbian League Belgrade: 2016–17

Malmö FF

- Allsvenskan: 2021
- Svenska Cupen: 2021–22

Toulouse

- Coupe de France: 2022–23

Sparta Prague

- Czech First League: 2023–24
- Czech Cup: 2023–24

Individual

- Allsvenskan Young Player of the Year: 2021
- Svenska Cupen Top goalscorer: 2021–22
- Czech First League player of the season: 2023–24
- Czech First League midfielder of the season: 2023–24
- Czech First League foreign player of the season: 2023–24
