= Isak Jönsson =

Swedish footballer (born 1999)

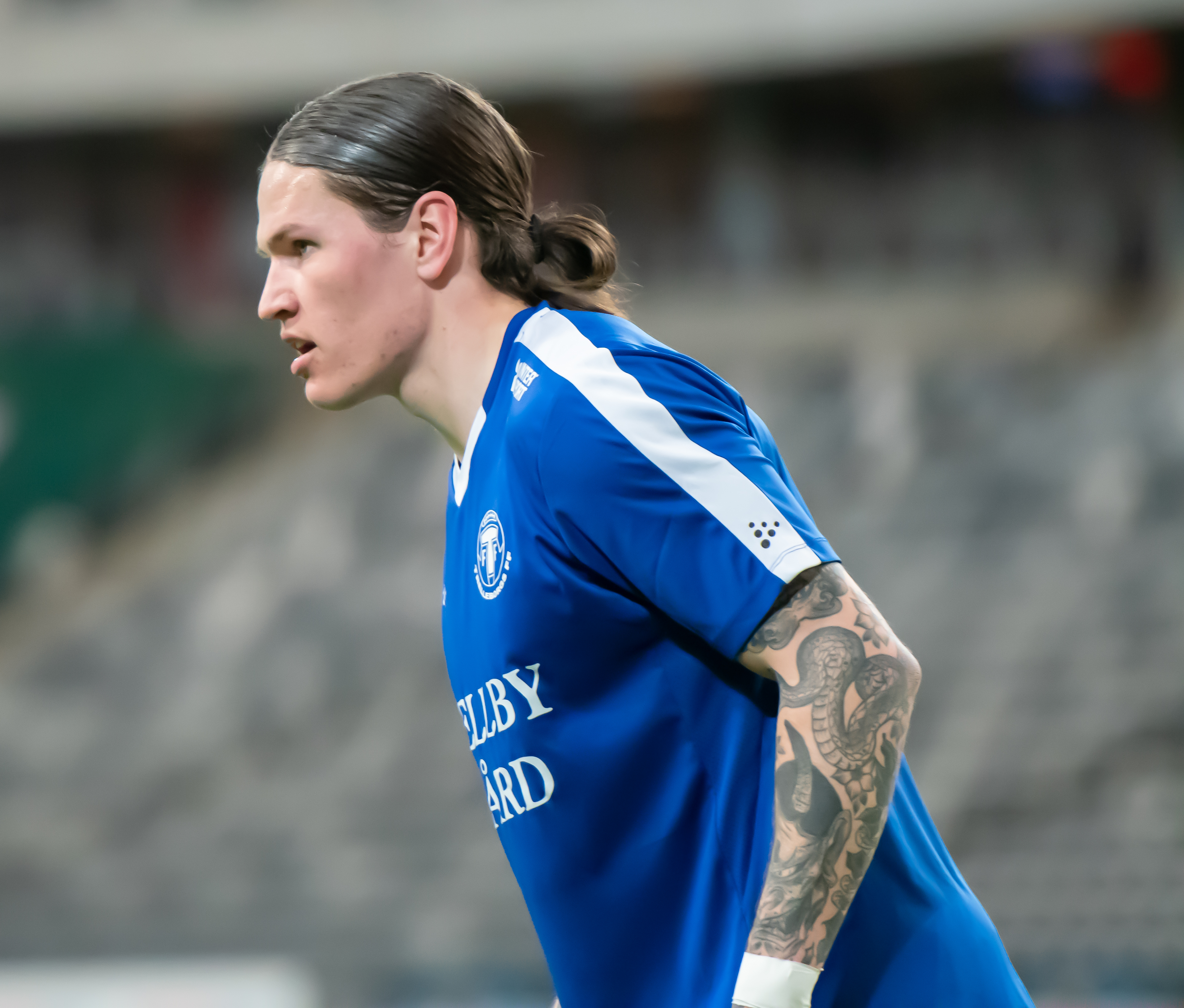
- Jönsson with Trelleborgs FF in 2021

Personal information
- Full name: Isak Fredrik Jönsson
- Date of birth: 11 January 1999 (age 27)
- Place of birth: Skurup, Sweden
- Height: 1.94 m (6 ft 4 in)
- Position: Centre back

Team information
- Current team: Egersund
- Number: 31

Youth career
- Skurups AIF
- 2014: BK Olympic

Senior career*
Years	Team	Apps	(Gls)
2015–2018	BK Olympic	54	(2)
2018–2022	Trelleborgs FF	120	(9)
2023	B36 Tórshavn	25	(1)
2024	Västerås	15	(1)
2025–	Egersund	59	(3)
- * Club domestic league appearances and goals as of 14 November 2026

Isak Jönsson (born 11 January 1999) is a Swedish footballer who plays for Egersund.

== Career ==
Born 11 January 1999, in Skurup, Jönsson began playing football in Skurups AIF. At age 15, he went to BK Olympic and already after a year, Jönsson was promoted to the first team.

On 4 March 2024, Jönsson joined Västerås for the 2024 season.

On 12 December 2024, Jönsson signed a three-year professional contract with Norwegian club Egersund.
