= Mubaarak Nuh =

Somali footballer (born 2002)

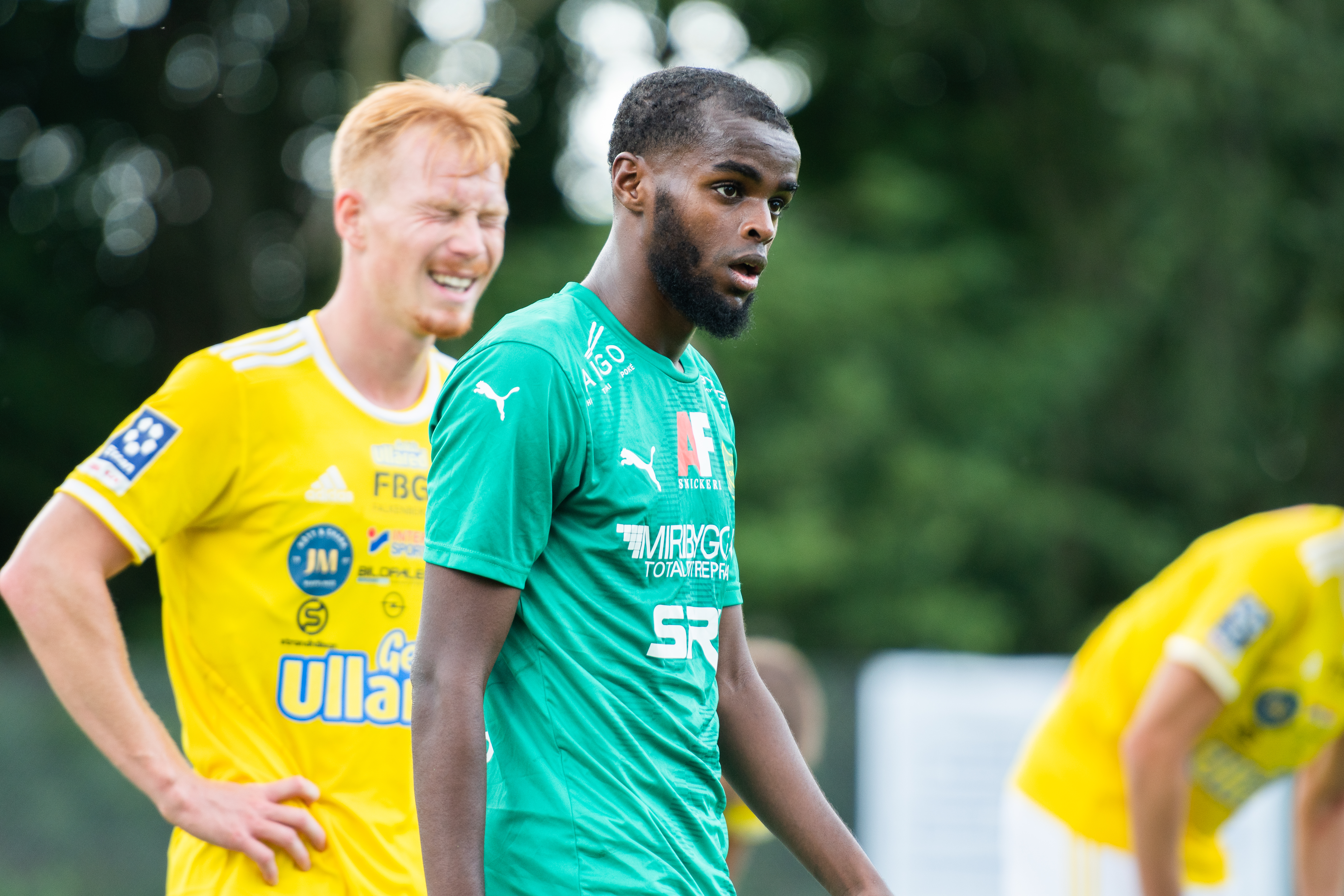
- Mubaarak Nuh in BK Olympic 2022

Personal information
- Full name: Mubaarak Mohamud Nuh
- Date of birth: 28 April 2002 (age 24)
- Place of birth: Somalia
- Height: 1.79 m (5 ft 10 in)
- Positions: Midfielder; winger

Team information
- Current team: Olympic
- Number: 24

Senior career*
Years	Team	Apps	(Gls)
2017–2018	Öster	1	(0)
2020–2024	Malmö FF	0	(0)
2021–2022	→ Jammerbugt (loan)	17	(1)
2022	→ Olympic (loan)	11	(2)
2023	→ Örgryte (loan)	15	(0)
2024	→ Olympic (loan)	22	(4)
2025–	Olympic	3	(0)
- * Club domestic league appearances and goals as of 24 November 2025 ‡ National team caps and goals as of 14 August 2024

Mubaarak Mohamud Nuh (born 28 April 2002) is a Somali footballer who plays as a midfielder or winger for Olympic.

== Early life ==
Nuh was born on 28 April 2002 in Somalia. He moved with his family to Sweden at the age of six. He has been nicknamed "Mubbe". He started his career with Swedish side Östers IF. He became the youngest played to play in the Swedish second tier at the age of fifteen.

== Career ==
Nuh trialled for English Premier League side Chelsea. After that, he signed for Swedish side Malmö FF. He represented Sweden internationally at under-17 and under-18 level. In 2021, he was sent on loan to Danish side Jammerbugt FC. In 2022, he was sent on loan to Swedish side BK Olympic. In 2023, he was sent on loan to Swedish side Örgryte IS. He has been called up to the Somalia national football team. In 2024, he returned on loan to Swedish side BK Olympic.

== Style of play ==
Nuh mainly operates as a midfielder or winger. He is known for his speed and dribbling ability. He has operated as a full-back. He has also operated as a forward.
