= Albin Palmlöv =

Swedish footballer

Personal information
- Date of birth: 17 December 2001 (age 24)
- Place of birth: Sweden
- Position: Midfielder

Team information
- Current team: Selånger SK

Senior career*
Years	Team	Apps	(Gls)
2019–2021	GIF Sundsvall	22	(2)
2022–	Selånger SK	0	(0)
- * Club domestic league appearances and goals as of 27 November 2022

Fritz Albin Palmlöv (also written Palmlöf, born 17 December 2001) is a Swedish footballer who plays for Selånger SK.
