= Rodin Deprem =

Swedish footballer

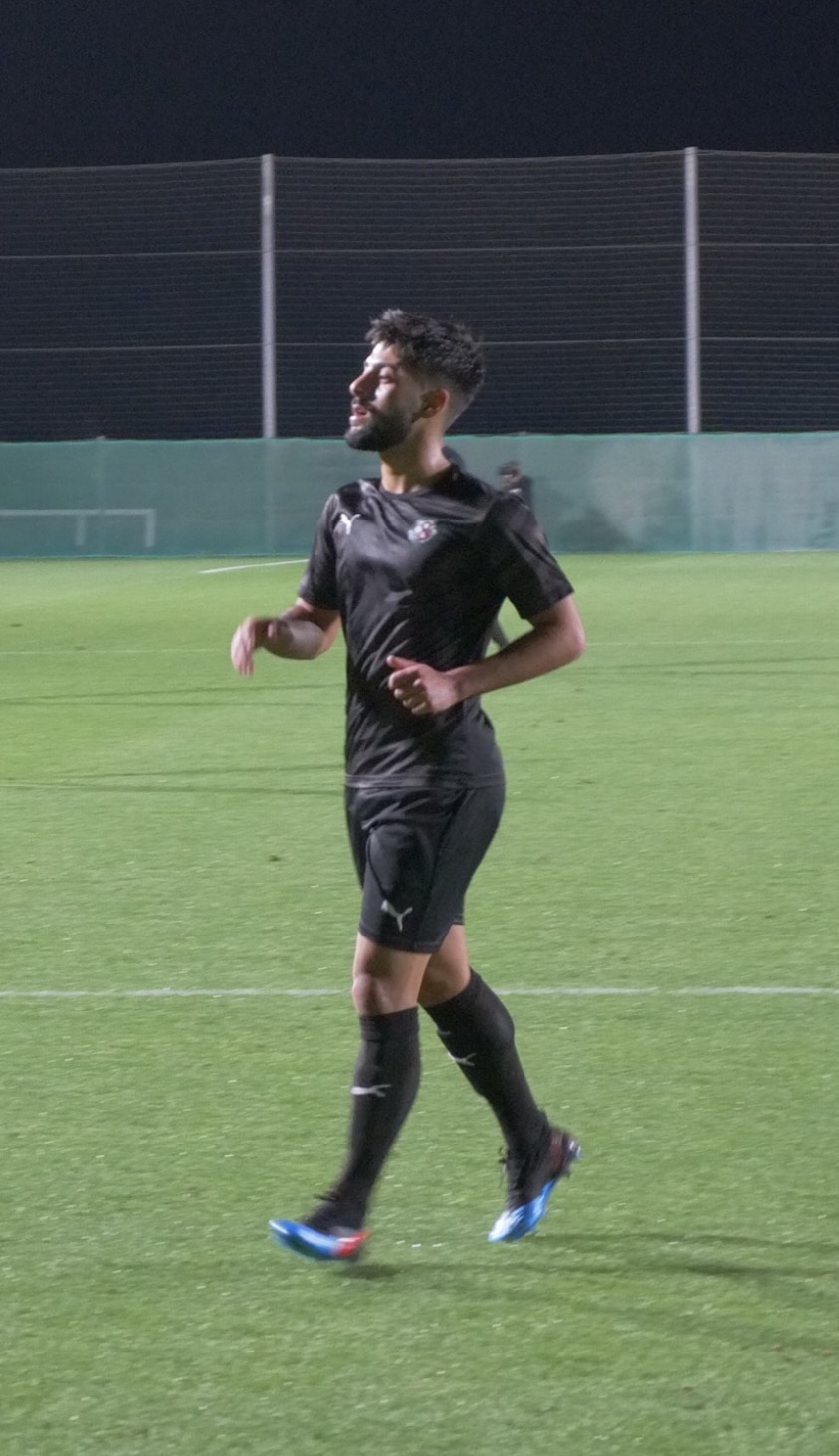
- Deprem in 2019

Personal information
- Full name: Rodin Cem Deprem
- Date of birth: 23 May 1998 (age 28)
- Place of birth: Gävle, Sweden
- Height: 1.77 m (5 ft 10 in)
- Position: Striker

Team information
- Current team: Dalkurd FF
- Number: 9

Youth career
- Rynninge IK
- Örebro SK

Senior career*
Years	Team	Apps	(Gls)
2014–2016	Rynninge IK	42	(5)
2018–2019	Örebro SK	13	(0)
2020	Greuther Fürth II	1	(0)
2020	Umeå FC	12	(0)
2021	Örebro Syrianska	14	(12)
2021–2022	Brommapojkarna	23	(10)
2022	Dalkurd	35	(12)
- * Club domestic league appearances and goals as of 15 October 2023

Rodin Cem Deprem (born 23 May 1998) is a Swedish footballer who is currently without a club.

== Club career ==
=== Rynninge IK ===
Deprem spent the first years of his childhood in the city of Gävle before moving to Örebro at the age of six. In his new home town Deprem started playing football for the local club Rynninge IK. During his young teens Deprem performed well in the youth teams which resulted in the club giving him the chance to play in the Swedish Division 2 at the age of 16. Deprem played in the senior squad for two and a half seasons before leaving.

=== Örebro SK ===
Deprem left Rynninge to join Örebro SK in the summer of 2016. After an impressive period during 2017, he managed to set the record for most goals scored in the U19 Allsvenskan until date with 29 goals in 22 games. The season caught the eye of several clubs, and Deprem was close to signing with Dutch club De Graafschap but the deal was stopped due to the clubs disagreeing on terms.

Later Deprem signed a professional contract with Örebro SK and was promoted to the first team in 2018. During his first season in Allsvenskan, Deprem played 8 games, 1 from start and 7 as a substitute. During his second season Deprem played 5 games, 2 from start and 3 as a substitute. After the 2019 season, Deprem left the club due to lack of playing time.

=== Greuther Fürth II ===
On the 29 of January 2020 it was confirmed, that Deprem had joined the reserve team of SpVgg Greuther Fürth. Deprem was only able to play one league game before it was declared that the league would postponed due to the corona pandemic.

=== Umeå FC ===
Deprem moved back to Sweden and on the 21 of August 2020, he joined Superettan club Umeå FC on a deal for the rest of 2020, with an option for a further year.

=== Örebro Syrianska IF ===
On 27 January 2021, Deprem signed a one-year contract with Örebro Syrianska IF.

=== Brommapojkarna ===
On 27 July 2021, Deprem joined Brommapojkarna on a 2.5-year contract. In his first year at the club, Deprem became the top scorer of Ettan Norra with 20 goals and gained promotion to Superettan.

=== Dalkurd FF ===
On 2 August 2022, Deprem joined Dalkurd FF on a deal for the rest of 2022, with an option for a further year.

=== Gençlerbirliği ===
On 17 January 2023, Deprem joined TFF First League club Gençlerbirliği on a 1.5-year deal. However, his contract was terminated by the club the very next day. Sources from the club stated that, "The only reason for the termination of the contract is because Rodin Cem Deprem is Kurdish and previously played for Dalkurd FF."

=== Return to Dalkurd FF ===
On 18 February 2023, Deprem returned to Dalkurd FF, signing a two-year contract.
