= Hovshaga AIF =

Swedish football club

- Full name: Hovshaga Allmänna Idrottsförening
- Founded: 1986
- Ground: Hagavallen; Växjö; Sweden
- Chairman: Torbjörn Axelsson
- League: Division 4 Sydvästra Småland
Home colours	Away colours

Hovshaga AIF is a Swedish football club located in Växjö in Växjö Municipality, Kronoberg County.

== Background ==
Hovshaga AIF (abbreviated as HAIF) is one of Småland's biggest sporting clubs and is based at the Hagavallen and Hovshaga sports hall. HAIF is active in football, bandy, floorball and tennis. There is also a table tennis section that is dormant at the moment.

The football club currently plays in Division 4 Sydvästra Småland which is the sixth tier of Swedish football. They play their home matches at the Hagavallen in Växjö.

The club is affiliated to Smålands Fotbollförbund.

The record for most appearances are held by Robin Backström which entered his 13th season in the club (2013) with 197 games for the first team.

== Season to season ==
Season	Level	Division	Section	Position	Movements
1999	Tier 7	Division 6	Värend	10th	
2000	Tier 7	Division 6	Värend	7th	
2001	Tier 7	Division 6	Alvesta	7th	
2002	Tier 7	Division 6	Värend	2nd	
2003	Tier 7	Division 6	Värend	1st	Promoted
2004	Tier 6	Division 5	Småland Södra	4th	
2005	Tier 6	Division 5	Småland Södra	3rd	
2006*	Tier 7	Division 5	Småland Södra	7th	
2007	Tier 7	Division 5	Småland Södra	5th	
2008	Tier 7	Division 5	Småland Södra	6th	
2009	Tier 7	Division 5	Småland Södra	3rd	
2010	Tier 7	Division 5	Småland Södra	2nd	Promotion Playoffs – Promoted
2011	Tier 6	Division 4	Småland Sydvästra	1st	Promoted
2012	Tier 6	Division 4 Elit	Småland Västra	7th	

* League restructuring in 2006 resulted in a new division being created at Tier 3 and subsequent divisions dropping a level.
