= Räppe GoIF =

- Full name: Räppe Gymnastik- och Idrottsförening
- Founded: 1930
- Ground: Räppevallen, Växjö
- League: Division 2
- 2023: 5th

Räppe Gymnastik- och Idrottsförening is a Swedish association football club from Växjö. The club was founded in 1930.

The home field is Räppevallen. In the late 2010s, the former Räppevallen had to be demolished to use the space for Växjö Hospital.

The men's football team plays in the Division 2, the fifth tier of Swedish football. The team also reached the first rounds of the Swedish Cup in 2020, 2022 and 2023, and the second round in 2021.
