= 2021 Allsvenskan =

97th season of Allsvenskan

Allsvenskan
- Season: 2021
- Dates: 10 April 2021 – 4 December 2021
- Champions: Malmö FF; 25th Allsvenskan title 22nd Swedish title
- Relegated: Halmstads BK; Örebro SK; Östersunds FK
- Champions League: Malmö FF
- Europa Conference League: AIK; Djurgårdens IF; IF Elfsborg
- Matches: 240
- Goals: 638 (2.66 per match)
- Top goalscorer: Samuel Adegbenro (17 goals)
- Biggest home win: Östersunds FK 5–0 Örebro SK (18 April 2021); BK Häcken 5–0 Östersunds FK (8 August 2021); BK Häcken 5–0 IFK Norrköping (18 October 2021)
- Biggest away win: Degerfors IF 0–5 Malmö FF (17 July 2021)
- Highest scoring: Hammarby IF 5–3 Kalmar FF (4 December 2021)
- Longest winning run: 5 matches AIK
- Longest unbeaten run: 11 matches AIK
- Longest winless run: 11 matches Mjällby AIF
- Longest losing run: 5 matches Örebro SK; Mjällby AIF; Östersunds FK; Degerfors IF
- Highest attendance: 42,539; AIK 1–0 Djurgårdens IF (3 October 2021)
- Average attendance: 4,405

The 2021 Allsvenskan was the 97th season since its establishment in 1924 of Sweden's top-level football league, Allsvenskan. A total of 16 teams participated. Malmö FF were the defending champions after winning the title in the previous season, and they defended the championship in the 30th and final round on 4 December 2021 and secured their 22nd Swedish championship title by playing a scoreless tie at home against Halmstads BK, resulting in Malmö FF winning the title on better goal difference than the runner-up (AIK). This was the first time the title was defended since 2017, and the third consecutive defense of the title that went to Malmö FF, having also defended the title in 2014.

The 2021 Allsvenskan season began on 10 April and ended on 4 December 2021 (not including play-off matches).

== Teams ==
Location of teams in 2021 Allsvenskan

A total of sixteen teams are contesting the league, including fourteen sides from the previous season, and two promoted teams from the 2020 Superettan.

Falkenbergs FF and Helsingborgs IF (both relegated after two years in the top flight) were relegated at the end of the 2020 season after finishing at the bottom two places of the table, and were replaced by the 2020 Superettan champions Halmstads BK (promoted after a three-year absence) and runners-up Degerfors IF (promoted after a twenty-three-year absence).

=== Stadiums and locations ===
Team	Location	Stadium	Turf	Stadium capacity
AIK	Solna	Nationalarenan (Note: Known as Friends Arena for sponsorship reasons.)	Natural	50,000
BK Häcken	Gothenburg	Nya Rambergsvallen (Note: Known as Bravida Arena for sponsorship reasons.)	Artificial	6,500
Degerfors IF	Degerfors	Stora Valla	Natural	7,500
Djurgårdens IF	Stockholm	Stockholmsarenan (Note: Known as Tele2 Arena for sponsorship reasons.)	Artificial	30,000
Halmstads BK	Halmstad	Örjans Vall	Natural	11,100
Hammarby IF	Stockholm	Stockholmsarenan (Note: Known as Tele2 Arena for sponsorship reasons.)	Artificial	30,000
IF Elfsborg	Borås	Borås Arena	Artificial	16,899
IFK Göteborg	Gothenburg	Gamla Ullevi	Natural	18,600
IFK Norrköping	Norrköping	Nya Parken (Note: Known as Platinumcars Arena for sponsorship reasons.)	Artificial	15,734
IK Sirius	Uppsala	Studenternas IP	Artificial	10,000
Kalmar FF	Kalmar	Kalmar Arena (Note: Known as Guldfågeln Arena for sponsorship reasons.)	Natural	12,000
Malmö FF	Malmö	Malmö Nya Stadion (Note: Known as Eleda Stadion for sponsorship reasons.)	Natural	22,500
Mjällby AIF	Hällevik	Strandvallen	Natural	6,750
Varbergs BoIS	Varberg	Påskbergsvallen (Note: Known as Varberg Energi Arena for sponsorship reasons.)	Natural	4,500
Örebro SK	Örebro	Eyravallen (Note: Known as Behrn Arena for sponsorship reasons.)	Artificial	12,300
Östersunds FK	Östersund	Östersund Arena (Note: Known as Jämtkraft Arena for sponsorship reasons.)	Artificial	8,466

=== Personnel and kits ===
All teams are obligated to have the logo of the league sponsor Unibet as well as the Allsvenskan logo on the right sleeve of their shirt.

Note: Flags indicate national team as has been defined under FIFA eligibility rules. Players and Managers may hold more than one non-FIFA nationality.

Team	Head coach	Captain	Kit manufacturer	Main shirt sponsor
AIK	(Poland) Bartosz Grzelak	(Eritrea) Henok Goitom	Nike	Notar
BK Häcken	(Norway) Per-Mathias Høgmo	(Sweden) Rasmus Lindgren	Puma	BRA
Degerfors IF	(Sweden) Andreas Holmberg (Sweden) Tobias Solberg	(Sweden) Oliver Ekroth	Umbro	Various
Djurgårdens IF	(Sweden) Kim Bergstrand (Sweden) Thomas Lagerlöf	(Sweden) Magnus Eriksson	Adidas	Prioritet Finans
Halmstads BK	(Sweden) Magnus Haglund	(Sweden) Andreas Johansson	Puma	Various
Hammarby IF	(Serbia) Miloš Milojević	(Sweden) Darijan Bojanić	Craft	Huski Chocolate
IF Elfsborg	(Sweden) Jimmy Thelin	(Sweden) Johan Larsson	Umbro	Sparbanken Sjuhärad
IFK Göteborg	(Sweden) Mikael Stahre	(Sweden) Marcus Berg	Craft	Serneke
IFK Norrköping	(Sweden) Rikard Norling	(Sweden) Christoffer Nyman	Nike	Holmen
IK Sirius	(Sweden) Daniel Bäckström	(Sweden) Tim Björkström	Select	Various
Kalmar FF	(Sweden) Henrik Rydström	(Sweden) Erik Israelsson	Select	Hjältevadshus
Malmö FF	(Denmark) Jon Dahl Tomasson	(Denmark) Anders Christiansen	Puma	Volkswagen
Mjällby AIF	(Sweden) Anders Torstensson	(Sweden) David Löfquist	Puma	Various
Varbergs BoIS	(Sweden) Joakim Persson	(Sweden) Jon Birkfeldt	Craft	Various
Örebro SK	(Sweden) Marcus Lantz	(Sweden) Nordin Gerzić	Select	Behrn Fastigheter
Östersunds FK	(Norway) Per Joar Hansen	(Guinea) Aly Keita	Adidas	Volkswagen

=== Managerial changes ===
Team	Outgoing manager	Manner of departure	Date of vacancy	Table	Incoming manager	Date of appointment
Mjällby AIF	(Sweden) Marcus Lantz	End of contract	6 December 2020.	Pre-season	(Sweden) Christian Järdler	20 December 2020
IK Sirius	(Sweden) Henrik Rydström	Resigned	6 December 2020	Pre-season	(Sweden) Daniel Bäckström	14 December 2020
Kalmar FF	(Sweden) Nanne Bergstrand	End of contract	15 December 2020	Pre-season	(Sweden) Henrik Rydström	29 December 2020
IFK Norrköping	(Sweden) Jens Gustafsson	Mutual consent	19 December 2020	Pre-season	(Sweden) Rikard Norling	23 December 2020
BK Häcken	(Sweden) Andreas Alm	Signed by OB	1 June 2021	16th	(Norway) Per-Mathias Høgmo	12 June 2021
Örebro SK	(Sweden) Axel Kjäll	Promoted to Director of Football Operations	25 May 2021	15th	(Portugal) Vítor Gazimba	2 June 2021
IFK Göteborg	(Sweden) Roland Nilsson	Sacked	2 June 2021	10th	(Sweden) Mikael Stahre	2 June 2021
Hammarby IF	(Sweden) Stefan Billborn	Sacked	11 June 2021	8th	(Serbia) Miloš Milojević	13 June 2021
Mjällby AIF	(Sweden) Christian Järdler	Sacked	3 August 2021	15th	(Sweden) Anders Torstensson	3 August 2021
Östersunds FK	(Sweden) Amir Azrafshan	Sacked	2 September 2021	16th	(Norway) Per Joar Hansen	2 September 2021
Örebro SK	(Portugal) Vítor Gazimba	Sacked	7 October 2021	15th	(Sweden) Marcus Lantz	7 October 2021

== League table ==
Pos	Team	Pld	W	D	L	GF	GA	GD	Pts	Qualification or relegation
1	Malmö FF (C)	30	17	8	5	58	30	+28	59	Qualification for the Champions League first qualifying round
2	AIK	30	18	5	7	45	25	+20	59	Qualification for the Europa Conference League second qualifying round (Note: The 2021–22 Svenska Cupen winners qualified for the Europa Conference League second qualifying round. Since the cup winners (Malmö FF) qualified based on league position, the cup winner spot was passed to the second-placed team, and the last Conference League second qualifying round spot was passed to the fourth-placed team.)
3	Djurgårdens IF	30	17	6	7	46	30	+16	57	Qualification for the Europa Conference League second qualifying round
4	IF Elfsborg	30	17	4	9	51	35	+16	55	Qualification for the Europa Conference League second qualifying round
5	Hammarby IF	30	15	8	7	54	41	+13	53	
6	Kalmar FF	30	13	8	9	41	39	+2	47	
7	IFK Norrköping	30	13	5	12	45	41	+4	44	
8	IFK Göteborg	30	11	8	11	42	39	+3	41	
9	Mjällby AIF	30	9	11	10	34	27	+7	38	
10	Varbergs BoIS	30	9	10	11	35	38	−3	37	
11	IK Sirius	30	10	7	13	39	53	−14	37	
12	BK Häcken	30	9	9	12	46	46	0	36	
13	Degerfors IF	30	10	4	16	34	51	−17	34	
14	Halmstads BK (R)	30	6	14	10	21	26	−5	32	Qualification for the relegation play-offs
15	Örebro SK (R)	30	4	6	20	23	58	−35	18	Relegation to Superettan
16	Östersunds FK (R)	30	3	5	22	24	59	−35	14	Relegation to Superettan

Source: svenskfotboll.se (in Swedish)
Rules for classification: 1) Points; 2) Goal difference; 3) Goals scored; 4) Head-to-head points; 5) Head-to-head goal difference; 6) Head-to-head away goals scored; 7) Play-off
(Note: Play-off is only played if need to decide champion, teams for relegation or UEFA competition and will be played on a neutral ground).
(C) Champions; (R) Relegated

== Positions by round ==
Team ╲ Round	1	2	3	4	5	6	7	8	9	10	11	12	13	14	15	16	17	18	19	20	21	22	23	24	25	26	27	28	29	30
Malmö FF	3	2	2	6	3	3	2	2	2	2	2	2	2	1	2	2	3	4	4	3	2	3	1	3	1	1	1	1	1	1
AIK	1	9	5	2	5	7	3	3	6	5	4	5	3	3	3	3	1	2	1	2	3	2	3	2	4	4	3	3	2	2
Djurgårdens IF	2	1	1	1	1	1	1	1	1	1	1	1	1	2	1	1	2	1	2	1	1	1	2	1	3	2	2	2	3	3
IF Elfsborg	16	8	6	7	8	5	7	4	3	3	3	3	4	4	4	4	4	3	3	4	5	5	4	4	2	3	4	4	4	4
Hammarby IF	13	7	10	10	7	4	5	8	8	6	5	4	5	5	5	5	5	6	6	6	6	7	6	5	5	6	5	5	5	5
Kalmar FF	8	6	4	4	4	6	8	5	7	8	9	11	7	7	7	6	7	7	7	7	7	6	7	7	7	7	6	6	6	6
IFK Norrköping	6	11	9	5	2	2	4	6	4	4	6	6	6	6	6	7	6	5	5	5	4	4	5	6	6	5	7	7	7	7
IFK Göteborg	7	4	8	9	10	10	11	10	12	9	7	8	9	9	9	11	12	11	11	11	12	13	12	11	9	8	10	9	8	8
Mjällby AIF	9	13	13	12	9	9	10	9	11	13	13	14	15	15	15	15	14	14	14	13	13	11	11	13	12	11	12	10	12	9
Varbergs BoIS	10	12	14	13	14	15	13	14	15	15	14	13	13	13	12	9	8	8	8	8	8	9	10	10	10	9	9	11	9	10
IK Sirius	5	5	3	3	6	8	9	12	9	11	12	10	12	11	13	13	11	9	9	9	9	10	9	9	11	13	11	12	10	11
BK Häcken	14	15	16	15	16	16	16	16	13	10	8	7	8	8	8	10	9	10	10	10	10	8	8	8	8	10	8	8	11	12
Degerfors IF	15	16	12	14	11	11	6	7	5	7	10	12	11	12	10	12	13	13	13	14	14	14	13	12	13	14	14	14	14	13
Halmstads BK	4	10	11	11	13	14	12	11	10	12	11	9	10	10	11	8	10	12	12	12	11	12	14	14	14	12	13	13	13	14
Örebro SK	11	14	15	16	15	12	14	15	16	16	16	16	14	14	14	14	15	15	15	15	15	15	15	15	15	15	15	15	15	15
Östersunds FK	12	3	7	8	12	13	15	13	14	14	15	15	16	16	16	16	16	16	16	16	16	16	16	16	16	16	16	16	16	16

Leader
2022–23 UEFA Europa Conference League Second qualifying round
Relegation play-offs
Relegation to 2022 Superettan

Source: everysport.com

== Results by round ==
Team ╲ Round	1	2	3	4	5	6	7	8	9	10	11	12	13	14	15	16	17	18	19	20	21	22	23	24	25	26	27	28	29	30
AIK	W	L	W	W	L	D	W	D	L	W	W	D	W	W	W	W	W	D	W	D	L	W	L	W	L	L	W	W	W	W
BK Häcken	L	L	L	D	D	L	D	W	W	W	W	D	L	W	L	L	W	L	D	D	D	W	W	L	D	L	W	D	L	L
Degerfors IF	L	L	W	L	W	D	W	D	W	L	L	L	D	L	W	L	L	L	L	L	W	D	W	W	L	L	L	L	W	W
Djurgårdens IF	W	W	W	W	L	W	D	D	W	D	W	W	W	L	W	D	L	W	D	W	W	L	L	W	L	W	W	D	L	W
Halmstads BK	W	L	L	D	L	D	W	D	D	D	D	W	L	D	D	W	L	L	L	D	D	D	L	W	D	W	L	L	D	D
Hammarby IF	L	W	L	D	W	W	D	L	D	W	W	W	D	D	L	D	W	L	W	W	D	L	W	W	W	L	W	W	D	W
IF Elfsborg	L	W	W	L	D	W	L	L	W	W	W	W	D	W	W	D	W	W	L	L	L	W	W	W	W	L	D	W	L	W
IFK Göteborg	D	W	L	D	D	D	D	D	L	W	W	L	L	D	W	L	L	W	L	L	L	L	W	W	W	W	L	D	W	W
IFK Norrköping	D	L	W	W	W	D	L	L	W	W	L	L	W	L	W	L	W	D	W	W	W	W	L	L	D	W	L	D	L	L
IK Sirius	D	W	W	D	L	L	D	L	W	L	L	W	L	D	L	D	W	W	W	L	D	L	W	L	L	L	W	D	W	L
Kalmar FF	D	W	W	D	D	D	L	W	D	L	L	L	W	W	D	W	L	W	W	D	W	W	L	L	D	W	W	W	L	L
Malmö FF	W	W	D	L	W	D	W	W	L	W	W	W	W	D	L	W	L	D	D	W	W	L	W	D	W	W	W	D	W	D
Mjällby AIF	D	L	L	W	W	D	D	D	L	L	L	L	L	D	L	D	W	D	D	D	W	W	W	L	D	W	L	W	D	W
Varbergs BoIS	D	L	L	W	L	L	W	L	D	L	D	W	D	D	W	W	W	W	L	D	L	D	L	D	D	W	D	L	W	L
Örebro SK	D	L	L	L	W	W	L	L	L	L	L	D	W	D	L	D	L	L	L	W	L	L	L	L	D	L	L	L	D	L
Östersunds FK	D	W	D	L	L	L	L	W	L	L	L	L	D	L	L	L	L	L	W	L	L	D	L	L	D	L	L	L	L	L

Source: Soccerstats.com (in English)
W = Win; D = Draw; L = Lose

== Results ==
Home \ Away	AIK	BKH	DEG	DIF	HBK	HAM	IFE	IFKG	IFKN	IKS	KFF	MFF	MAIF	VAR	ÖSK	ÖFK
AIK		2–1	2–0	1–0	1–0	2–0	1–0	3–1	1–0	4–2	2–0	1–1	2–2	2–1	2–0	3–0
BK Häcken	2–1		2–0	0–1	2–3	1–1	1–1	3–2	5–0	1–2	1–4	1–2	0–0	3–1	2–3	5–0
Degerfors IF	2–1	3–0		2–0	2–1	1–4	1–2	0–1	4–1	1–2	0–1	0–5	0–2	1–1	3–0	3–1
Djurgårdens IF	1–4	2–1	3–2		1–0	4–1	0–3	0–0	1–0	5–1	3–2	3–1	0–0	2–3	3–0	2–0
Halmstads BK	1–0	1–0	0–0	0–0		0–0	0–1	1–1	2–1	1–1	0–1	0–0	1–1	1–1	1–1	1–1
Hammarby	1–0	1–1	5–1	2–2	1–1		0–2	3–0	2–1	3–2	5–3	2–1	2–0	1–0	3–2	4–3
IF Elfsborg	2–4	4–2	3–0	0–2	2–3	2–2		1–0	1–0	3–0	2–2	0–1	1–0	0–0	2–1	3–0
IFK Göteborg	2–0	1–1	2–3	3–0	2–0	0–0	0–1		1–2	2–2	0–2	0–2	3–2	1–2	2–0	4–0
IFK Norrköping	2–0	0–1	1–1	1–1	2–1	3–1	3–2	1–2		1–1	1–2	3–2	2–2	2–1	3–0	3–0
IK Sirius	0–1	3–0	2–0	1–0	1–0	0–1	0–2	3–3	2–4		1–1	2–3	2–1	2–1	1–2	1–0
Kalmar FF	1–1	2–3	4–1	0–1	1–1	2–1	0–3	0–0	1–0	3–1		0–1	1–0	2–2	1–0	0–0
Malmö FF	1–0	2–2	3–0	1–1	0–0	3–2	2–1	2–3	1–1	4–0	3–1		0–1	3–2	5–1	1–1
Mjällby AIF	0–0	1–1	1–0	0–1	0–0	2–0	4–0	1–3	0–1	2–3	4–0	0–2		0–0	0–0	1–0
Varbergs BoIS	0–1	1–1	0–0	1–3	1–0	1–3	1–3	2–0	2–1	0–0	1–1	1–1	0–3		1–0	3–0
Örebro SK	1–1	1–2	1–2	0–1	1–0	0–2	2–3	0–0	0–3	1–1	1–2	1–2	2–2	0–3		2–0
Östersunds FK	1–2	1–1	0–1	0–3	0–1	1–1	3–1	2–3	1–2	3–0	0–1	0–3	0–2	1–2	5–0	

Source: Swedish Football Association (in Swedish)
Legend: Blue = home team win; Yellow = draw; Red = away team win.
For upcoming matches, an "a" indicates there is an article about the rivalry between the two participants.

== Relegation play-offs ==
The 14th-placed team of Allsvenskan met the third-placed team from 2021 Superettan in a two-legged tie on a home-and-away basis with the team from Allsvenskan finishing at home.

11 December 2021
15:00

Helsingborgs IF	0–1	Halmstads BK
	Report	Karim 7'

Olympia, Helsingborg
Attendance: 8,108
Referee: Andreas Ekberg

14 December 2021
19:00

Halmstads BK	1–3	Helsingborgs IF
Kroon 39'	Report	Loeper 32'; Van den Hurk 84'; Karjalainen 90'

Örjans Vall, Halmstad
Attendance: 6,385
Referee: Glenn Nyberg

Helsingborgs IF won 3–2 on aggregate and are promoted.

== Season statistics ==
=== Top scorers ===
As of 4 December 2021

Rank	Player	Club	Goals
1	(Nigeria) Samuel Adegbenro	IFK Norrköping	17
2	(Croatia) Antonio Čolak	Malmö FF	14
2	(Sweden) Victor Edvardsen	Degerfors IF	14
4	(Norway) Oliver Berg	Kalmar FF	12
4	(Sweden) Christian Kouakou	IK Sirius	12
4	(Argentina) Nicolás Stefanelli	AIK	12
7	(Sweden) Alexander Jeremejeff	BK Häcken	11
7	(Sweden) Gustav Ludwigson	Hammarby IF	11
9	(Sweden) Nabil Bahoui	AIK	10
9	(Sweden) Marcus Berg	IFK Göteborg	10
9	(Jamaica) Blair Turgott	Östersunds FK	10

=== Hat-tricks ===
Player	For	Against	Result	Date
(Jamaica) Blair Turgott	Östersunds FK	Örebro SK	5–0	18 April 2021
(Sweden) Victor Edvardsen	Degerfors IF	Örebro SK	3–0	18 May 2021
(Jamaica) Blair Turgott	Östersunds FK	IF Elfsborg	3–1	19 September 2021
(Kosovo) Astrit Selmani^{4 goals}	Hammarby IF	Kalmar FF	5–3	4 December 2021

=== Discipline ===
==== Player ====
- Most yellow cards: 12
  - (Sweden) Sebastian Larsson (AIK)
- Most red cards: 2
  - (Sweden) Johan Hammar (BK Häcken)
  - (South Africa) Luke Le Roux (Varbergs BoIS)

==== Club ====
- Most yellow cards: 78
  - Varbergs BoIS
- Most red cards: 5
  - IF Elfsborg

== Awards ==
=== Annual awards ===
Award	Winner	Club
Player of the Year	(Sweden) Magnus Eriksson	Djurgården
Goalkeeper of the Year	(Finland) Carljohan Eriksson	Mjällby AIF
Defender of the Year	(Sweden) Hjalmar Ekdal	Djurgårdens IF
Midfielder of the Year	(Sweden) Magnus Eriksson	Djurgårdens IF
Striker of the Year	(Nigeria) Samuel Adegbenro	Norrköping
Breakthrough of the Year	(Serbia) Veljko Birmančević	Malmö FF
Coach of the Year	(Sweden) Henrik Rydström	Kalmar FF

== See also ==
Competitions

- 2021 Superettan
- 2021 Division 1
- 2020–21 Svenska Cupen
- 2021–22 Svenska Cupen

Team seasons

- 2021 AIK season
- 2021 Hammarby IF season
- 2021 Malmö FF season
