= 2017 Allsvenskan =

93rd season of Allsvenskan

Allsvenskan
- Season: 2017
- Champions: Malmö FF; 23rd Allsvenskan title 20th Swedish title
- Relegated: J-Södra; Halmstads BK; AFC Eskilstuna
- Champions League: Malmö FF
- Europa League: AIK; Djurgården; BK Häcken
- Matches: 240
- Goals: 667 (2.78 per match)
- Top goalscorer: Magnus Eriksson; Karl Holmberg (14 goals)
- Biggest home win: Malmö FF 6–0 Kalmar FF (11 August 2017); Malmö FF 6–0 IF Elfsborg (25 September 2017)
- Biggest away win: BK Häcken 1–6 AIK (24 September 2017)
- Highest scoring: IF Elfsborg 4–4 Östersunds FK (2 May 2017)
- Longest winning run: 4 games IFK Norrköping; Malmö FF
- Longest unbeaten run: 13 games AIK
- Longest winless run: 16 games Halmstads BK
- Longest losing run: 7 games IK Sirius
- Highest attendance: 33,157; AIK 1–1 Djurgårdens IF (27 August 2017)
- Lowest attendance: 887; AFC Eskilstuna 1–3 IK Sirius (5 November 2017)
- Average attendance: 9,215

The 2017 Allsvenskan, part of the 2017 Swedish football season, is the 93rd season of Allsvenskan since its establishment in 1924. The season began on 1 April 2017 and ended on 5 November the same year. Fixtures for the 2017 season were announced on 9 December 2016. A total of 16 teams participated.

Malmö FF were the defending champions after winning the title in the previous season. Malmö FF won the Swedish championship this season, their 23rd Allsvenskan title and 20th Swedish championship overall, in the 27th round on 16 October 2017 when they won 3–1 in the away fixture against IFK Norrköping at Östgötaporten.

== Summary ==
=== Allsvenskans stora pris ===
For the fifth year running, the broadcaster of Allsvenskan, C More Entertainment, hosted an award ceremony where they presented seven awards and two special awards to the players and staff of the 16 Allsvenskan clubs, the award ceremony was held on 7 November 2017. The nominations for the 2017 season were officially announced on 3 November 2017. Nominees are displayed below, the winners are marked in bold text. Malmö FF and Djurgårdens IF received the most nominations with six nominations each, while Östersunds FK received three nominations, IFK Göteborg received two nominations, and AIK, BK Häcken, GIF Sundsvall, and IFK Norrköping each received one nomination.

Goalkeeper of the year

- **Johan Wiland** (Hammarby IF/Malmö FF)
- Andreas Isaksson (Djurgårdens IF)
- Pontus Dahlberg (IFK Göteborg)

Defender of the year

- **Anton Tinnerholm** (Malmö FF)
- Per Karlsson (AIK)
- Eric Larsson (GIF Sundsvall)

Midfielder of the year

- **Anders Christiansen** (Malmö FF)
- Ken Sema (Östersunds FK)
- Magnus Eriksson (Djurgårdens IF)

Forward of the year

- **Saman Ghoddos** (Östersunds FK)
- Markus Rosenberg (Malmö FF)
- Karl Holmberg (IFK Norrköping)

Newcomer of the year

- **Pontus Dahlberg** (IFK Göteborg)
- Felix Beijmo (Djurgårdens IF)
- Daleho Irandust (BK Häcken)

Manager of the year

- **Graham Potter** (Östersunds FK)
- Magnus Pehrsson (Malmö FF)
- Özcan Melkemichel (Djurgårdens IF)

Most valuable player of the year

- **Anders Christiansen** (Malmö FF)
- Magnus Eriksson (Djurgårdens IF)
- Kim Källström (Djurgårdens IF)

== Suspended matches ==
=== IFK Göteborg vs. AIK ===
The match at Gamla Ullevi between IFK Göteborg and AIK on 18 May 2017 was postponed, following reports of attempted match fixing. The match was rescheduled for 10 August 2017.

== Teams ==
Location of teams in 2017 Allsvenskan

A total of sixteen teams are contesting the league, including thirteen sides from the previous season, two promoted teams from the 2016 Superettan and one team from the 2016 Allsvenskan play-offs.

Gefle IF and Falkenbergs FF were relegated at the end of the 2016 season after finishing in the bottom two places of the table. They were replaced by 2016 Superettan champions IK Sirius and runners-up AFC United. IK Sirius returned to Allsvenskan after 42 years' absence, having been relegated at the end of the 1974 season. This is IK Sirius' fourth season in the league. AFC United are participating in the league for the first time in the club's history; they are the third new club in the last four Allsvenskan seasons (following Falkenbergs FF in 2014 and Östersunds FK in 2016).

The final spot will be taken by the 2016 Allsvenskan play-offs winner; Halmstads BK, third-placed team in 2016 Superettan.

=== Stadia and locations ===
Team	Location	Stadium	Turf^{1}	Stadium capacity^{1}
AFC Eskilstuna	Eskilstuna	Tunavallen	Artificial	7,800
AIK	Stockholm	Friends Arena	Natural	50,000
BK Häcken	Gothenburg	Bravida Arena	Artificial	6,500
Djurgårdens IF	Stockholm	Tele2 Arena	Artificial	30,000
GIF Sundsvall	Sundsvall	Idrottsparken	Artificial	7,700
Halmstads BK	Halmstad	Örjans Vall	Natural	10,873
Hammarby IF	Stockholm	Tele2 Arena	Artificial	30,000
IF Elfsborg	Borås	Borås Arena	Artificial	16,899
IFK Göteborg	Gothenburg	Gamla Ullevi	Natural	18,600
IFK Norrköping	Norrköping	Nya Parken	Artificial	15,734
IK Sirius	Uppsala	Studenternas IP	Natural	6,300
Jönköpings Södra IF	Jönköping	Stadsparksvallen	Natural	5,500
Kalmar FF	Kalmar	Guldfågeln Arena	Natural	12,000
Malmö FF	Malmö	Swedbank Stadion	Natural	24,000
Örebro SK	Örebro	Behrn Arena	Artificial	12,300
Östersunds FK	Östersund	Jämtkraft Arena	Artificial	8,466

- ^{1} According to each club information page at the Swedish Football Association website for Allsvenskan.

=== Personnel and sponsoring ===
All teams are obligated to have the logo of the league sponsor Svenska Spel as well as the Allsvenskan logo on the right sleeve of their shirt.

Note: Flags indicate national team as has been defined under FIFA eligibility rules. Players and Managers may hold more than one non-FIFA nationality.

Team	Head coach^{1}	Captain	Kit manufacturer	Main shirt sponsor
AFC Eskilstuna	(England) Michael Jolley	(Sweden) Omar Eddahri	Nike	Busmarket
AIK	(Sweden) Rikard Norling	(Sweden) Nils-Eric Johansson	Adidas	Åbro Bryggeri
BK Häcken	(Sweden) Mikael Stahre	(Sweden) Rasmus Lindgren	Nike	BRA Bygg
Djurgårdens IF	(Sweden) Özcan Melkemichel	(Sweden) Kim Källström	Adidas	Prioritet Finans
GIF Sundsvall	(Sweden) Joel Cedergren	(Sweden) Tommy Naurin	Adidas	SCA
Halmstads BK	(Sweden) Igor Krulj	(Sweden) Fredrik Liverstam	Puma	Various
Hammarby IF	(Denmark) Jakob Michelsen	(Sweden) Kennedy Bakircioglu	Puma	LW
IF Elfsborg	(Sweden) Magnus Haglund	(Denmark) Kevin Stuhr Ellegaard	Umbro	Pulsen
IFK Göteborg	(Sweden) Alf Westerberg	(Sweden) Sebastian Eriksson	Kappa	Prioritet Finans
IFK Norrköping	(Sweden) Jens Gustafsson	(Sweden) Andreas Johansson	Nike	Holmen
IK Sirius	(Sweden) Kim Bergstrand	(Sweden) Niklas Busch Thor	Nike	Various
Jönköpings Södra IF	(Sweden) Jimmy Thelin	(Sweden) Tommy Thelin	Nike	Various
Kalmar FF	(Sweden) Nanne Bergstrand	(Sweden) Rasmus Elm	Hummel	Hjältevadshus
Malmö FF	(Sweden) Magnus Pehrsson	(Sweden) Markus Rosenberg	Puma	Volkswagen
Örebro SK	(Sweden) Axel Kjäll	(Sweden) Nordin Gerzić	Puma	Ambitiös
Östersunds FK	(England) Graham Potter	(Iraq) Brwa Nouri	Adidas	Various

=== Managerial changes ===
Team	Outgoing manager	Manner of departure	Date of vacancy	Table	Incoming manager	Date of appointment
Djurgården	(England) Mark Dempsey	End of contract	6 November 2016	Pre-season	(Sweden) Özcan Melkemichel	1 December 2016
Häcken	(Sweden) Peter Gerhardsson	End of contract	11 November 2016	Pre-season	(Sweden) Mikael Stahre	14 November 2016
Hammarby	(Sweden) Nanne Bergstrand	Sacked	18 November 2016	Pre-season	(Denmark) Jakob Michelsen	30 November 2016
Malmö	(Denmark) Allan Kuhn	Sacked	19 November 2016	Pre-season	(Sweden) Magnus Pehrsson	1 December 2016
Eskilstuna	(Sweden) Özcan Melkemichel	End of contract	1 December 2016	Pre-season	(Sweden) Pelle Olsson	December 2016
Eskilstuna	(Sweden) Pelle Olsson	Sacked	28 May 2017	16th	(England) Michael Jolley	13 June 2017
Halmstad	(Sweden) Jan Jönsson	Promoted to Director of Football	8 June 2017	15th	(Sweden) Igor Krulj	8 June 2017
Kalmar	(Sweden) Peter Swärdh	Sacked	13 June 2017	14th	(Sweden) Nanne Bergstrand	13 June 2017
Göteborg	(Sweden) Jörgen Lennartsson	Sacked	18 July 2017	11th	(Sweden) Alf Westerberg	18 July 2017
Örebro	(Sweden) Alexander Axén	Mutual consent	28 August 2017	11th	(Sweden) Axel Kjäll	28 August 2017
Elfsborg	(Sweden) Magnus Haglund	Sacked	27 September 2017	10th	(Sweden) Nemanja Miljanović (Sweden) Janne Mian	27 September 2017

== League table ==
Pos	Team	Pld	W	D	L	GF	GA	GD	Pts	Qualification or relegation
1	Malmö FF (C)	30	19	7	4	63	27	+36	64	Qualification for the Champions League first qualifying round
2	AIK	30	16	9	5	47	22	+25	57	Qualification for the Europa League first qualifying round
3	Djurgårdens IF	30	15	8	7	54	30	+24	53	Qualification for the Europa League second qualifying round (Note: Since the winners of 2017–18 Svenska Cupen (Djurgårdens IF) qualified for European competitions based on their league position, the berth awarded to the 3rd-placed team (Europa League second qualifying round) was passed down to the 4th-placed team (BK Häcken).)
4	BK Häcken	30	14	10	6	42	28	+14	52	Qualification for the Europa League first qualifying round
5	Östersunds FK	30	13	11	6	48	32	+16	50	
6	IFK Norrköping	30	14	6	10	45	40	+5	48	
7	IK Sirius	30	11	7	12	46	51	−5	40	
8	IF Elfsborg	30	10	9	11	53	59	−6	39	
9	Hammarby IF	30	9	11	10	42	43	−1	38	
10	IFK Göteborg	30	9	10	11	42	40	+2	37	
11	Örebro SK	30	10	6	14	38	54	−16	36	
12	Kalmar FF	30	9	5	16	30	49	−19	32	
13	GIF Sundsvall	30	7	10	13	29	46	−17	31	
14	Jönköpings Södra IF (R)	30	6	12	12	31	46	−15	30	Qualification for the relegation play-offs
15	Halmstads BK (R)	30	5	9	16	29	45	−16	24	Relegation to the Superettan
16	AFC Eskilstuna (R)	30	4	8	18	28	55	−27	20	Relegation to the Superettan

Source: svenskfotboll.se (in Swedish)
Rules for classification: 1) Points; 2) Goal difference; 3) Goals scored; 4) Head-to-head points; 5) Head-to-head goal difference; 6) Head-to-head away goals scored; 7) Play-off
(Note: Play-off is only played if need to decide champion, teams for relegation or UEFA competition and will be played on a neutral ground).
(C) Champions; (R) Relegated

== Positions by round ==
Team ╲ Round	1	2	3	4	5	6	7	8	9	10	11	12	13	14	15	16	17	18	19	20	21	22	23	24	25	26	27	28	29	30
Malmö FF	7	1	1	1	1	1	1	1	1	1	1	1	1	1	1	1	1	1	1	1	1	1	1	1	1	1	1	1	1	1
AIK	9	5	9	12	8	9	6	5	6	4	7	4	6	5	2	2	4	2	4	3	3	4	4	4	3	3	2	2	2	2
Djurgårdens IF	15	15	7	11	14	8	2	3	5	7	3	6	5	4	7	3	2	3	2	2	2	2	2	2	2	2	3	3	3	3
BK Häcken	10	11	5	9	11	5	8	6	3	3	6	10	8	10	8	8	9	6	5	6	4	3	3	3	4	5	4	5	5	4
Östersunds FK	13	10	13	14	7	7	4	9	10	8	4	3	4	6	4	6	5	7	7	8	7	6	5	6	6	6	5	4	4	5
IFK Norrköping	4	8	14	7	3	3	5	4	2	2	2	2	2	2	5	5	6	5	6	5	6	5	6	5	5	4	6	6	6	6
IK Sirius	3	9	3	2	2	2	3	2	4	5	8	5	3	3	3	4	3	4	3	4	5	7	7	8	8	10	8	9	10	7
IF Elfsborg	1	6	11	5	5	6	11	11	12	9	10	8	9	7	6	7	7	8	10	10	8	8	8	9	10	11	10	7	8	8
Hammarby IF	11	13	8	8	10	4	10	7	7	9	9	7	10	8	9	9	10	10	11	9	10	9	10	7	7	9	11	11	7	9
IFK Göteborg	8	2	4	6	6	12	9	10	8	6	5	9	7	9	10	10	8	9	8	7	9	10	9	10	11	8	7	8	9	10
Örebro SK	5	3	2	4	4	11	12	13	13	13	12	11	11	11	11	11	11	11	9	11	11	11	11	11	9	7	9	10	11	11
Kalmar FF	16	16	16	16	16	15	15	15	15	15	14	14	14	15	15	14	14	13	13	12	12	12	13	13	12	12	12	12	12	12
GIF Sundsvall	2	7	12	13	12	13	13	12	11	12	13	13	13	13	13	13	13	14	14	14	13	13	12	12	13	13	13	14	14	13
Jönköpings Södra IF	12	12	6	3	9	10	7	8	9	11	11	12	12	12	12	12	12	12	12	13	14	14	14	14	14	14	14	13	13	14
Halmstads BK	6	4	10	10	13	14	14	14	14	14	15	15	15	14	14	15	15	15	15	15	15	15	15	16	16	16	16	15	15	15
AFC Eskilstuna	14	14	15	15	15	16	16	16	16	16	16	16	16	16	16	16	16	16	16	16	16	16	16	15	15	15	15	16	16	16

Leader
2018–19 UEFA Europa League First qualifying round
Relegation play-offs
Relegation to 2018 Superettan

Source: everysport.com

== Results ==
Home \ Away	AFC	AIK	BKH	DIF	GIFS	HBK	HAM	IFE	IFKG	IFKN	IKS	JSIF	KFF	MFF	ÖSK	ÖFK
Eskilstuna	—	1–3	0–0	1–2	1–2	0–0	0–0	2–3	1–0	1–2	1–3	1–1	2–1	3–1	2–2	1–3
AIK	1–1	—	0–0	1–1	0–0	4–1	1–2	5–2	2–1	1–0	1–0	2–0	0–1	0–1	1–0	2–2
Häcken	3–0	1–6	—	0–0	2–0	2–1	2–0	3–0	4–0	1–2	2–2	3–1	2–0	0–1	1–1	0–1
Djurgården	4–1	0–1	1–1	—	2–1	2–1	1–1	3–0	1–0	3–3	0–2	0–0	4–1	0–1	4–1	3–0
Sundsvall	3–1	0–0	1–2	0–5	—	1–0	1–4	1–1	0–4	2–2	1–2	0–0	1–3	0–1	2–1	1–1
Halmstad	1–1	0–1	0–3	0–1	2–2	—	1–2	1–1	1–2	2–1	0–3	6–1	1–1	0–3	0–0	1–0
Hammarby	4–0	1–1	1–2	3–1	0–0	1–3	—	2–1	2–1	0–2	3–3	2–2	1–1	1–1	3–1	2–2
Elfsborg	2–1	1–2	2–0	2–2	2–1	1–0	3–0	—	1–2	3–3	0–2	3–0	2–2	1–2	3–0	4–4
Göteborg	1–1	2–1	1–1	1–3	0–3	1–1	1–1	1–1	—	4–1	4–0	1–1	3–0	1–1	2–2	0–1
Norrköping	1–0	0–0	4–1	0–1	0–0	3–2	2–1	1–3	2–0	—	0–2	3–0	2–0	1–3	2–0	0–2
Sirius	1–0	1–4	2–2	2–0	0–1	2–1	1–1	4–1	0–2	0–1	—	1–1	3–0	0–4	3–4	0–5
J-Södra	1–0	2–1	0–1	1–1	2–2	2–2	1–0	2–2	0–2	1–2	3–1	—	2–0	1–2	1–2	0–0
Kalmar	2–0	0–1	0–1	0–2	3–0	2–0	2–0	1–5	1–0	1–1	4–2	1–3	—	0–0	0–1	2–1
Malmö	3–2	0–0	1–2	3–2	2–0	2–0	4–0	6–0	2–2	1–2	3–3	2–0	6–0	—	2–1	2–1
Örebro	2–3	1–2	0–0	0–4	0–2	0–1	0–3	2–2	4–2	4–2	2–1	2–1	1–0	2–1	—	2–1
Östersund	3–0	0–3	0–0	2–1	3–1	0–0	2–1	4–1	1–1	1–0	0–0	1–1	2–1	2–2	3–0	—

Source: Swedish Football Association (in Swedish)
Legend: Blue = home team win; Yellow = draw; Red = away team win.

== Play-offs ==
The 14th-placed team of Allsvenskan meets the third-placed team from 2017 Superettan in a two-legged tie on a home-and-away basis with the team from Allsvenskan finishing at home.

15 November 2017
18:00

Trelleborgs FF	2–0	Jönköpings Södra IF
Jovanović 20'; Camara Jönsson 65'	Report

Vångavallen, Trelleborg
Attendance: 4,731
Referee: Andreas Ekberg (Bjärred)

19 November 2017
14:45

Jönköpings Södra IF	1–1	Trelleborgs FF
Gojani 40'	Report	Islamović 45+4'

Stadsparksvallen, Jönköping
Referee: Stefan Johannesson (Täby)

Trelleborgs FF won 3–1 on aggregate.

== Season statistics ==
=== Top scorers ===
As of 5 November 2017

Rank	Player	Club	Goals
1	(Sweden) Magnus Eriksson	Djurgårdens IF	14
1	(Sweden) Karl Holmberg	IFK Norrköping	14
3	(Norway) Jo Inge Berget	Malmö FF	10
3	(Sweden) Nahir Besara	Örebro SK	10
3	(Tunisia) Issam Jebali	IF Elfsborg	10
5	(Sierra Leone) Mohamed Buya Turay	AFC Eskilstuna	9
5	(Sweden) Tobias Hysén	IFK Göteborg	9
5	(Brazil) Paulinho	BK Häcken	9
5	(Sweden) Viktor Prodell	IF Elfsborg	9
5	(Argentina) Nicolás Stefanelli	AIK	9

=== Top goalkeepers ===
As of 5 November 2017
(Minimum of 10 games played)

Rank	Goalkeeper	Club	GP	GA	SV%	CS
1	(Sweden) Peter Abrahamsson	BK Häcken	26	25	80	12
2	(Sweden) Oscar Linnér	AIK	29	22	78	12
2	(Sweden) Johan Dahlin	Malmö FF	11	10	78	6
4	(Austria) Michael Langer	IFK Norrköping	15	18	77	5
5	(United States) Josh Wicks	IK Sirius	24	32	76	8
6	(Sweden) Andreas Isaksson	Djurgårdens IF	29	27	75	11
6	(Sweden) Andreas Andersson	Östersunds FK	10	13	75	3
8	(Sweden) Aly Keita	Östersunds FK	21	19	74	9
8	(Sweden) Lucas Hägg-Johansson	Kalmar FF	25	33	74	7
10	(Iran) Alireza Haghighi	AFC Eskilstuna	17	27	73	2

=== Hat-tricks ===
Player	For	Against	Result	Date
(Sweden) Gustav Engvall	Djurgårdens IF	Örebro SK	0–4	7 May 2017
(Sweden) Nahir Besara	Örebro SK	IFK Göteborg	4–2	16 July 2017
(Sweden) Filip Rogić	Örebro SK	IK Sirius	3–4	25 September 2017
(Argentina) Nicolás Stefanelli	AIK	IF Elfsborg	5–2	1 October 2017

== Awards ==
=== Annual awards ===
Award	Winner	Club
Player of the Year	(Denmark) Anders Christiansen	Malmö FF
Goalkeeper of the Year	(Sweden) Johan Wiland	Malmö FF\ Hammarby IF
Defender of the Year	(Sweden) Anton Tinnerholm	Malmö FF
Midfielder of the Year	(Denmark) Anders Christiansen	Malmö FF
Striker of the Year	(Iran) Saman Ghoddos	Östersunds FK
Breakthrough of the Year	(Sweden) Pontus Dahlberg	IFK Gothenburg
Coach of the Year	(England) Graham Potter	Östersunds FK

== Attendances ==
#	Club	Average	Highest
1	Hammarby IF	22,137	30,671
2	Malmö FF	18,254	21,354
3	AIK	17,807	33,157
4	Djurgårdens IF	16,241	26,648
5	IFK Göteborg	12,299	32,129
6	IFK Norrköping	9,004	14,533
7	IF Elfsborg	7,003	11,979
8	Örebro SK	6,283	9,271
9	Kalmar FF	6,236	10,318
10	Östersunds FK	5,265	7,821
11	IK Sirius FK	5,174	7,248
12	Halmstads BK	4,480	8,297
13	Jönköpings Södra IF	4,301	5,914
14	GIF Sundsvall	4,162	6,528
15	AFC Eskilstuna	3,748	7,500
16	BK Häcken	2,996	5,676

== See also ==
Competitions

- 2017 Superettan
- 2017 Division 1
- 2016–17 Svenska Cupen
- 2017–18 Svenska Cupen

Team seasons

- 2017 AIK Fotboll season
- 2017 Djurgårdens IF season
- 2017 Hammarby Fotboll season
- 2017 IFK Norrköping season
- 2017 Malmö FF season
