= Daniel Bäckström =

Daniel Bäckström may refer to:

- Daniel Bäckström (politician)
- Daniel Bäckström (footballer)
