= Billy Burnikell =

English footballer and manager

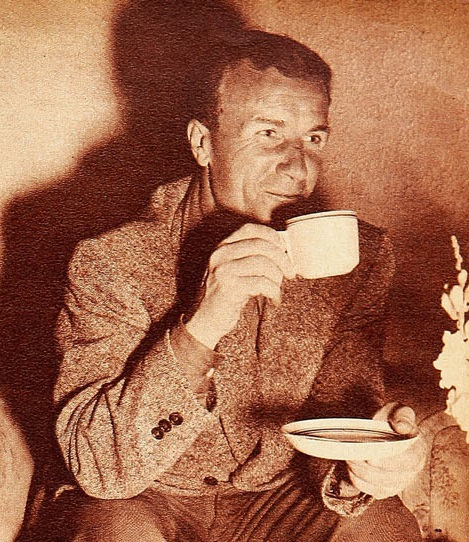

Personal information
- Full name: William Frederick Burnikell
- Date of birth: 9 December 1910
- Place of birth: Southwick, England
- Date of death: May 1980 (aged 69)
- Height: 5 ft 9 in (1.75 m)
- Position: Left half

Senior career*
Years	Team	Apps	(Gls)
1929–1933	Lincoln City	25	(0)
1933–1937	Bradford City	53	(2)
- Aldershot
Total		78	(2)

Managerial career
- 1947: Landskrona BoIS
- 1947–1949: Helsingborg
- 1949: Landskrona BoIS (caretaker)
- 1953–1954: Universidad Católica
- 1956: Halifax Town
- 1957–1959: Örebro SK
- 1960–1961: Degerfors IF
- * Club domestic league appearances and goals

William Frederick Burnikell (9 December 1910 – May 1980) was an English professional football player and manager. His surname was also spelt Burnicle.

== Career ==
Born in Southwick, Burnikell played as a left half for Lincoln City, Bradford City and Aldershot. For Lincoln City, he made 25 appearances in the Football League. For Bradford City, he made 52 appearances in the Football League, scoring two goals; he also made 3 FA Cup appearances.

He later became a football manager and was in charge of Halifax Town between April and December 1956. He also managed Swedish clubs Landskrona BoIS, Helsingborg, Örebro SK and Degerfors IF. He also won the Chilean Primera División in 1954 with Universidad Católica.

== Sources ==
- Frost, Terry (1988). Bradford City A Complete Record 1903-1988. Breedon Books Sport. ISBN 0-907969-38-0.
- Jönsson, Åke (1975). Ett fotbollslags historia: Landskrona BoIS 1915-1975. Malmö Handelstryckeri AB.
