= Kim Olsen =

Danish footballer (born 1979)

Personal information
- Full name: Kim Olsen
- Date of birth: 11 February 1979 (age 47)
- Place of birth: Denmark
- Height: 1.93 m (6 ft 4 in)
- Position: Forward

Senior career*
Years	Team	Apps	(Gls)
	Ikast FS	?	(?)
–2001	Holstebro Boldklub	?	(?)
2002–2004	FC Midtjylland	21	(4)
2004	Sheffield Wednesday	12	(0)
2004–2008	Silkeborg IF	67	(25)
2008–2010	Örebro SK	56	(19)
2010–2012	Vejle Boldklub	34	(17)
- * Club domestic league appearances and goals

Kim Olsen (born 11 February 1979) is a Danish retired football forward.

== Career ==
Kim Olsen started his career in Ikast FS before moving on to Holstebro BK and then to FC Midtjylland and played with them in the top Danish league, he then got the attention of English football club Sheffield Wednesday and he then joined the club in 2004, however his time in England was far from successful, shortly after signing for the club, coach Chris Turner was fired and the new manager made it clear for Kim that he was not in the clubs plans for the future. In October Kim and the club came to a mutual agreement to let him leave before the end of his contract ended, he then returned to Denmark and signed for Silkeborg IF. His time in Silkeborg was interrupted several times by injuries, during the summer of 2008 he was loaned out to Swedish club Örebro SK. The loan became such a success for both club and Kim, that they decided to make it a permanent move. So in November 2008 Kim signed a 3-years contract with Örebro SK. Due to personal reasons Olsen sent in a transfer request to the club, saying he needed to move back to Denmark because of his family situation. On 13 June 2010, the club announced they had sold Olsen to the Danish side of Vejle BK.
