= Hampus Söderström =

Swedish footballer

Personal information
- Full name: Karl Hampus Söderström
- Date of birth: 7 November 2000 (age 26)
- Place of birth: Sweden
- Height: 1.89 m (6 ft 2 in)
- Position: Central midfielder

Team information
- Current team: Örebro
- Number: 16

Youth career
- 2017–2019: Hammarby IF

Senior career*
Years	Team	Apps	(Gls)
2020	IK Frej	22	(9)
2021	Rukh Brest	4	(0)
2022	Sollentuna FK	30	(2)
2023	Skövde AIK	5	(0)
2023–2024	Hammarby TFF	36	(4)
2025–	Örebro	41	(2)
- * Club domestic league appearances and goals as of 12 November 2026

Karl Hampus Söderström (born 7 November 2000) is a Swedish professional footballer who plays as a central midfielder for Örebro.
