= Nordic Wellness Arena =

Football stadium in Gothenburg, Sweden

- Hisingen Arena (UEFA name)
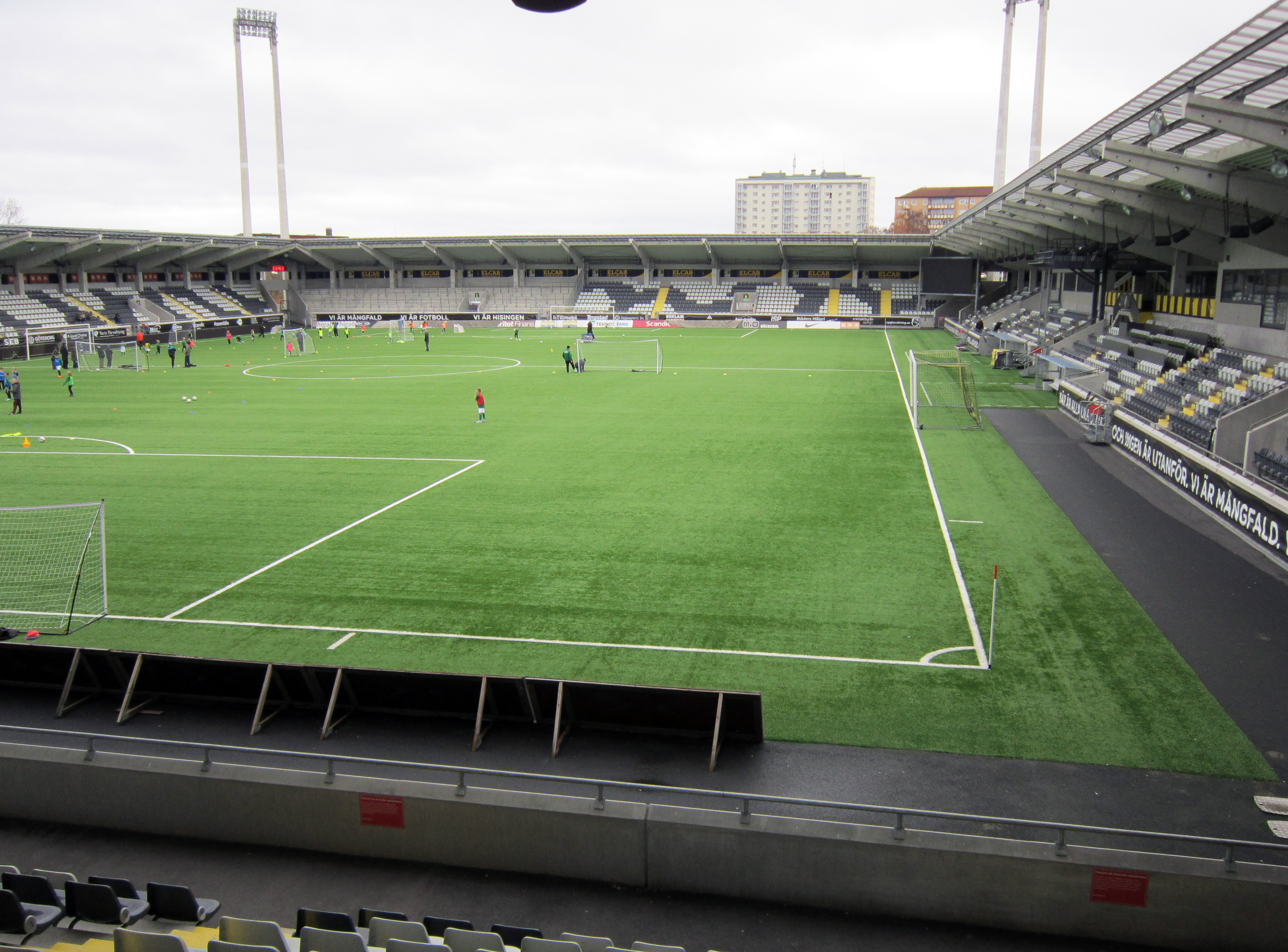
- Interactive map of Nordic Wellness Arena
- Location: Gothenburg, Sweden
- Coordinates: 57°43′9″N 11°55′50″E
- Owner: Higab
- Operator: GotEvent
- Capacity: 6,300
- Surface: Artificial turf

Construction
- Opened: June 2015
- Cost: 181 million SEK
- Main contractor: BRA Bygg

Tenants
- BK Häcken (2015–); BK Häcken FF (2021–); Utsiktens BK (2022–)

Nordic Wellness Arena, previously known as Bravida Arena, and as Hisingen Arena for UEFA competitions, is an association football stadium in Gothenburg, Sweden. The project was initiated by Allsvenskan side BK Häcken and Gothenburg Municipality to build a new 6,000 to 7,000 capacity stadium in the Hisingen area of Gothenburg, Sweden.

== History ==
A new stadium in the Hisingen area had been discussed for years time prior to the announcement that BK Häcken and Gothenburg Municipality had agreed. One of the reasons for building a new stadium is the new stadium criteria by the Swedish Football Association which went into effect in 2014. The new stadium is being built on the same site as Häcken's previous stadium Rambergsvallen which it replaced. BK Häcken held the naming rights for the stadium and announced that they would most likely sell them to an external sponsor. On 21 January 2015 it was announced that the name of the stadium would be Bravida Arena.
