= Higab =

Municipal company, Gothenburg, Sweden

Higab (previously Higabgruppen; English: Higab Group) is a municipal company wholly owned by Gothenburg Municipality in Sweden. The company was formed in 1966 as Hantverks- och Industrihus i Göteborg AB to administer and develop many of the public buildings in the municipality. The company also acts as a contractor from time to time. Some of the over 300 objects administered by Higab or its subsidiaries include Gothenburg City Theatre, Gothenburg Museum of Art, Feskekôrka, Röhss Museum, Barque Viking, Gamla Ullevi and Ullevi.
