= Axel Kjäll =

Swedish footballer and manager

Personal information
- Date of birth: 1 June 1981 (age 45)
- Height: 1.78 m (5 ft 10 in)
- Position: Defender

Senior career*
Years	Team	Apps	(Gls)
2000–2005	Örebro SK	50	(1)
2006–2008	Trelleborgs FF		
2008–2010	BK Forward		

Managerial career
- 2011–2012: BK Forward
- 2013–2014: Örebro SK (coach)
- 2015: Örebro SK (assistant)
- 2017–2021: Örebro SK
- 2021–2022: Örebro SK (director of sports)
- 2022: Örebro SK
- 2023–: Sweden U15
- * Club domestic league appearances and goals

Axel Kjäll (born 1 June 1981) is a Swedish football manager and retired football defender.

Ahead of the 2011 season he was named manager of BK Forward. He joined the coaching team of the city's larger team Örebro SK ahead of the 2013 season.

Having both played for and later managed Örebro SK for several seasons, he became director of sports in 2021. In 2022, the club sacked manager Joel Cedergren after a single league game, and Kjäll was brought back as manager. However, he did not last throughout the entire season either. He returned to an administrative position, but in December 2022 he was hired by the Swedish Football Association as head coach of the new Swedish U15 team.
