= Vítor Gazimba =

Portuguese football manager

Personal information
- Full name: Vítor Hugo Brito Gazimba
- Date of birth: 1 October 1987 (age 39)

Team information
- Current team: Portugal U16 (manager)

Managerial career
- Years: Team
- 2014–2018: Strømsgodset (assistant)
- 2019: Kongsvinger
- 2020–2021: Örebro (assistant)
- 2021: Örebro
- 2022–2024: Pogoń Szczecin (assistant)
- 2024: Al-Fateh (assistant)
- 2025–2026: BK Häcken (assistant)
- 2026–: Portugal U16

Vítor Hugo Brito Gazimba (born 1 October 1987) is a Portuguese professional football manager who is the current head coach of Portugal U16.

== Career ==
Moving to Norway after studying sports science, he was an assistant and academy manager in Strømsgodset for five seasons, and manager of Kongsvinger for one season.

He became assistant manager of Örebro in 2020 and manager in 2021. After only four months as manager of the Allsvenskan club, he was sacked in October 2021.

In June 2022, he was hired as assistant to Jens Gustafsson at Polish club Pogoń Szczecin. He left Pogoń on 23 August 2024, over a week after Gustafsson's departure. In January 2025, Gazimba signed on as assistant manager of BK Häcken, where Gustafsson had become manager.

Gazimba resigned in the summer of 2026 to become head coach of Portugal U16.
