= Alexander Axén =

Swedish football manager

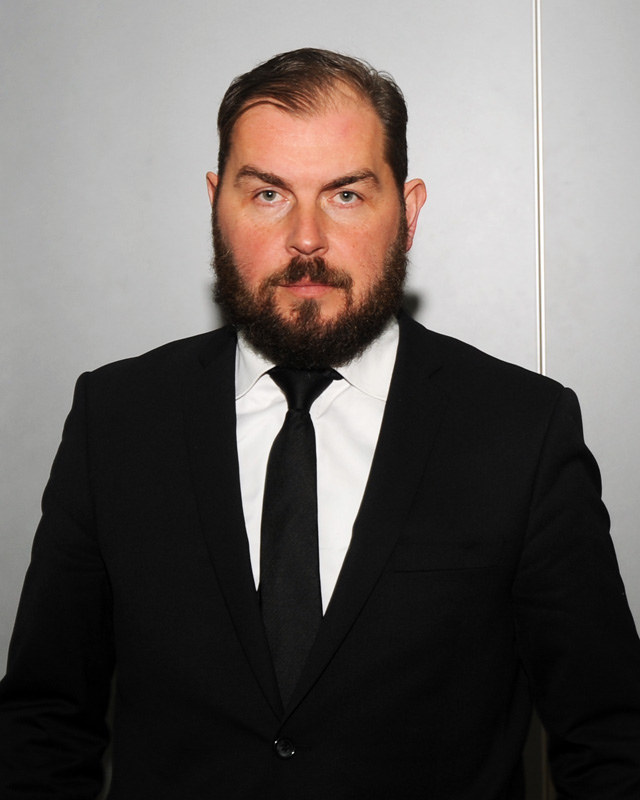

Personal information
- Full name: Bength Alexander Axén
- Date of birth: 15 October 1970 (age 56)
- Place of birth: Örebro, Sweden

Managerial career
- Years: Team
- 1998–2000: Hovsta IF
- 2000–2006: Rynninge IK
- 2007: IK Start (assistant)
- 2008: Örebro SK (assistant)
- 2009–2012: GAIS
- 2013–2014: Örebro SK (assistant)
- 2014–2017: Örebro SK

Alexander Axén (born 15 October 1970, Örebro, Sweden) is a Swedish football manager and TV pundit.
