= Daniel Bäckström (footballer) =

Swedish association football manager

Personal information
- Full name: Carl Daniel Bäckström
- Date of birth: 22 December 1987 (age 38)
- Place of birth: Umeå, Sweden
- Position: Midfielder

Youth career
- –2004: Tegs SK

Senior career*
Years	Team	Apps	(Gls)
2004	Sandåkerns SK		
2005–2006	Umedalens IF		
2007–2009	Umeå FC	12	(1)

Managerial career
- 2015–2016: IF Sylvia
- 2017–2019: Örebro SK (assistant)
- 2020: Malmö FF (assistant)
- 2021–2022: IK Sirius
- 2022–2026: Sweden U21
- 2024: Sweden (caretaker)
- * Club domestic league appearances and goals

Carl Daniel Bäckström (born 22 December 1987) is a Swedish football manager and former player. He was most recently the manager of Sweden U21.

After the 2020 season, Bäckström was appointed manager of Sirius, to replace Henrik Rydström. In 2022, Bäckström was appointed manager of Sweden U21. He was caretaker manager of Sweden in January 2024.
