= Örebro SK =

Swedish football club

- Full name: Örebro Sportklubb
- Short name: ÖSK; Örebro SK
- Founded: 28 October 1908; 118 years ago
- Ground: Behrn Arena, Örebro
- Capacity: 14,400
- Chairman: Lars Larsen
- Head coach: Rikard Norling
- League: Superettan
- 2025: Superettan, 14th of 16
- Website: oskfotboll.se
Home colours	Away colours

Örebro Sportklubb, more commonly known as Örebro SK, Örebro or (especially locally) ÖSK, is a Swedish professional football club based in Örebro. The club are affiliated to Örebro Läns Fotbollförbund and play their home games at Behrn Arena. The club colours are white shirts and black shorts, leading to the nickname Svartvitt (black-whites). Formed on 28 October 1908 the club have played 50 seasons in Sweden's highest football league Allsvenskan, the club's first season in the league was in 1946–47.

== History ==
=== The first years ===
The club was founded in 1908 when a group of 79 youngsters split from IFK Örebro following internal conflicts; Pelle Molin and Karl Graflund were the protagonists of the newly founded club. The club was first suggested to be named Örebro Idrottsförening (eng: Örebro athletic association) or Örebro Allmänna Idrottsklubb (eng: Örebro Public Athletic club), but the final choice was that the club should be called Örebro Sportklubb (ÖSK) and should play in all black.

In 1909 ÖSK won their first title, a local bandy tournament. The club's first football match was played the same year and in 1911 they first played league football in the Örebro League. ÖSK won the league for the first time in 1913.

In 1917 they participated in the Västmanland-Närkeserien and reached the semifinals in district championship.

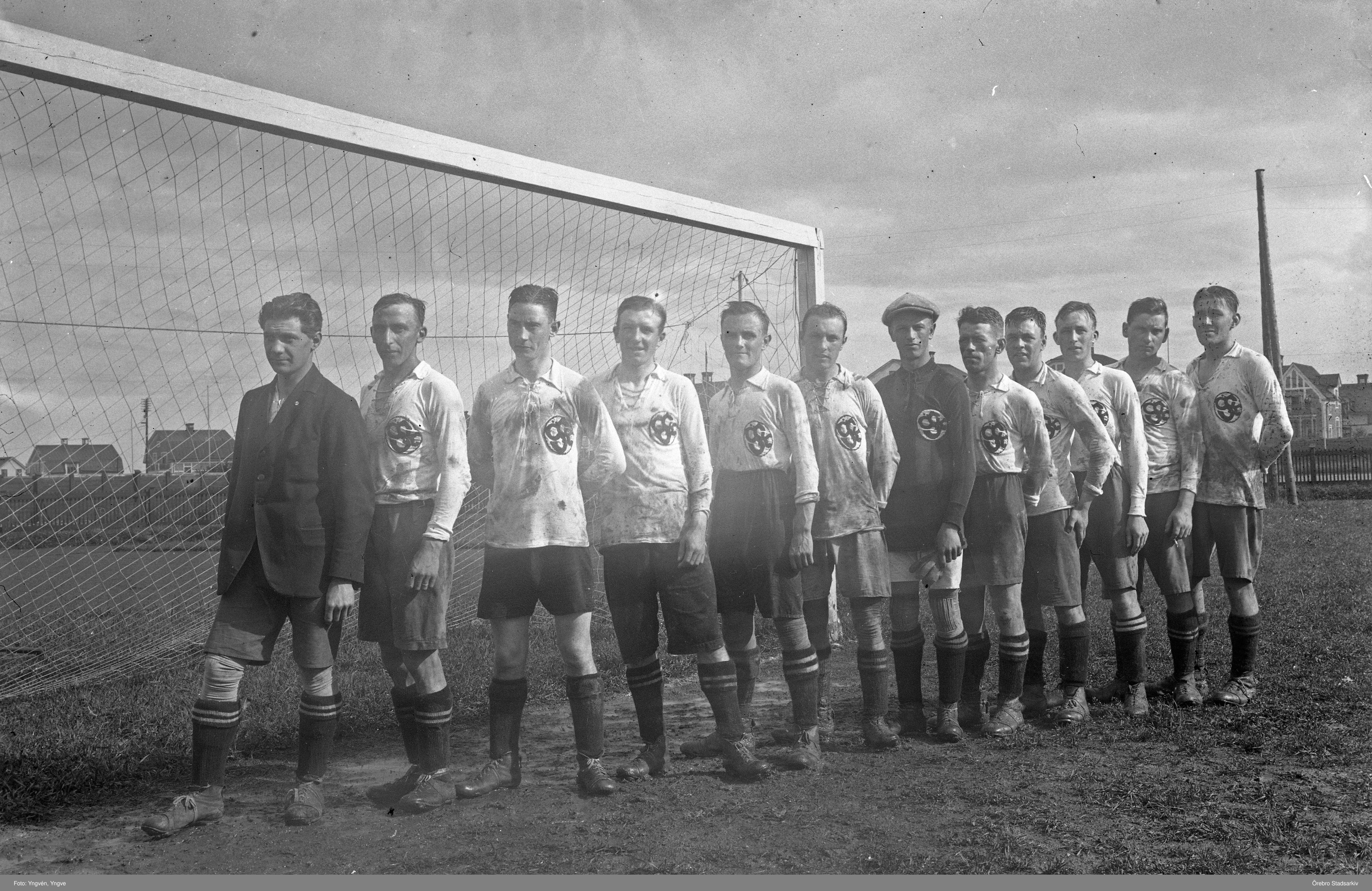
Örebro SK team photo from the 1920s.

In 1920 the first coach arrived, Hjalmar Bergman, and ÖSK participated in the cup for the national championship. ÖSK also played its first international match against B 93 Copenhagen.

1922 the club changed from all black to white shirts and black shorts.

Örebro SK celebrated 15 years anniversary in 1923 and Eyravallen, since 2005 known as Behrn Arena.

In 1925 Örebro finished last in Division 2 but were allowed to stay due to the fieldowner rule. In 1926 ÖSK was promoted to Division 1. After a first game draw, Örebro lost 0–4 to Westermalms IF in Stockholm and were relegated back to Division 2.

In 1928, when celebrating their 20th anniversary, ÖSK were relegated from Division 2 to Division 3. The third tier spell was believed to be 1-year only, but Örebro lost the play-off against Mariehovs IF. However, ÖSK returned to Division 2 in 1933 after winning Division 3 and in 1934 they finished second after IK Brage, only to be relegated back to Division 3 in 1936.

In 1939 Hungarian Konrad Kalman became new manager and Fritjof "Tjoffe" Olsson became the first ÖSK player to represent Sweden.

The club returned to Division 2 in 1940 after cruising through Division 3 undefeated and winning against IF Rune in the play-off. In the following year they finished runners-up in Division 2.

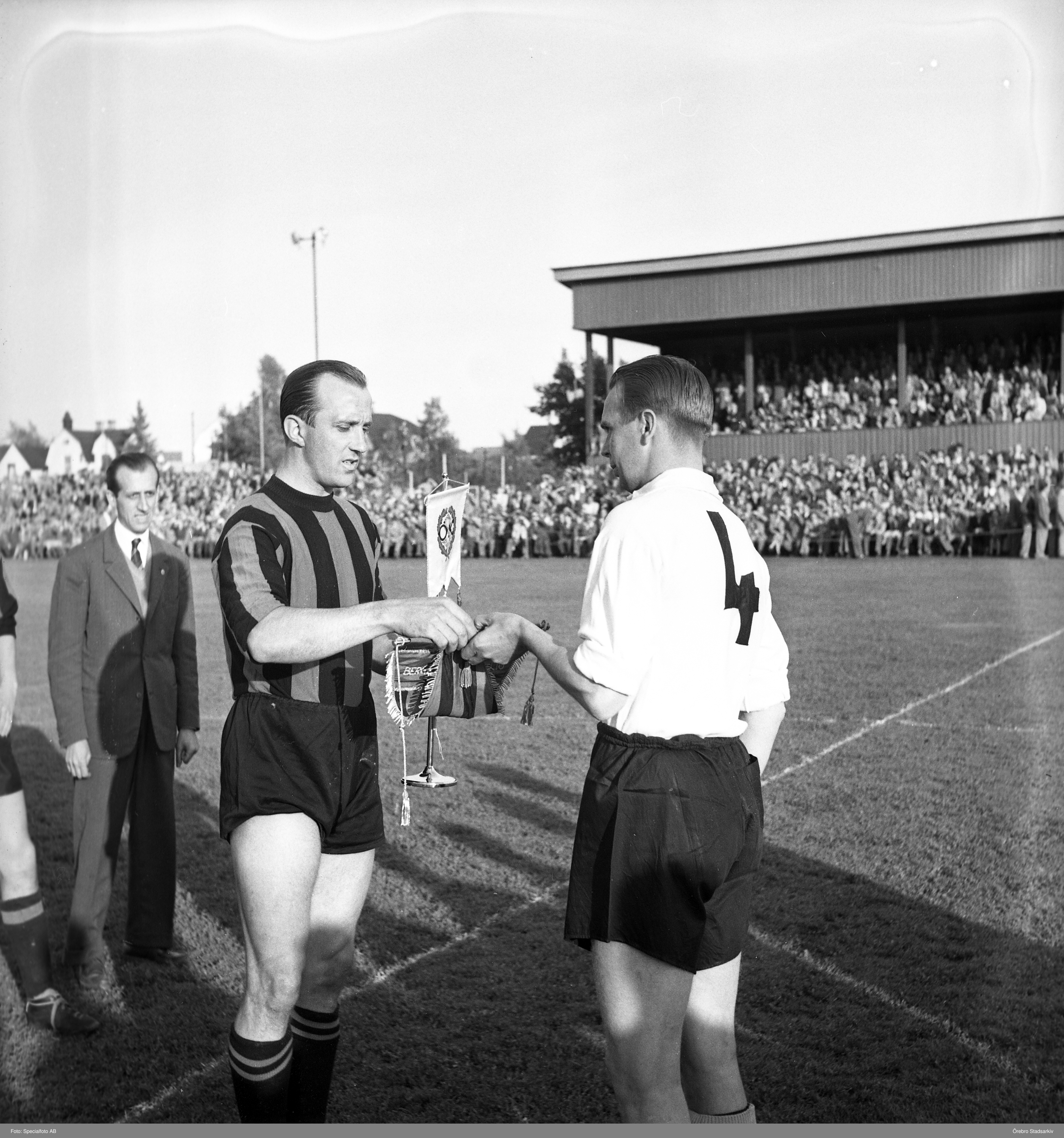
Team captains exchanging pennants before the 1950 friendly between Örebro SK and Atalanta BC.

In 1946 ÖSK was promoted to Allsvenskan for the first time after defeating Surahammar in the play-off, however the spell in the top flight lasted for one season only as they were relegated in 1947. The club returned to Allsvenskan yet again in 1948, when they were celebrating their 40th anniversary, but like last time the spell was only one year.

After yet again defeating Surahammar, this time in the final league game, they returned to Allsvenskan and this time they were there to stay a bit longer after defeating IF Elfsborg with 2–0 in the last game of the season. In 1952 the club made their best season so far and ended up on eighth place, but the following year the club was relegated back to Division 2.

In 1958 Orvar Bergmark played for the club and won silver in the 1958 FIFA World Cup that was hosted by Sweden. One of the club's founding members, Karl Graflund, retired after 48 years as chairman and two years as secretary, due to illness.

=== Established in Allsvenskan (1960–1978) ===
Örebro SK returned to Allsvenskan in 1960 after defeating IFK Kristianstad and IFK Luleå in the play-off. The same year the club sold its stadium Eyravallen to the municipality of Örebro.

The club won the bronze medal in 1961 after finishing fourth. The derby against rivals Degerfors IF was attended by 20,066 spectators, which still stands as club record. In 1962 the club finished sixth position and Orvar Bergmark left the club to join AS Roma.

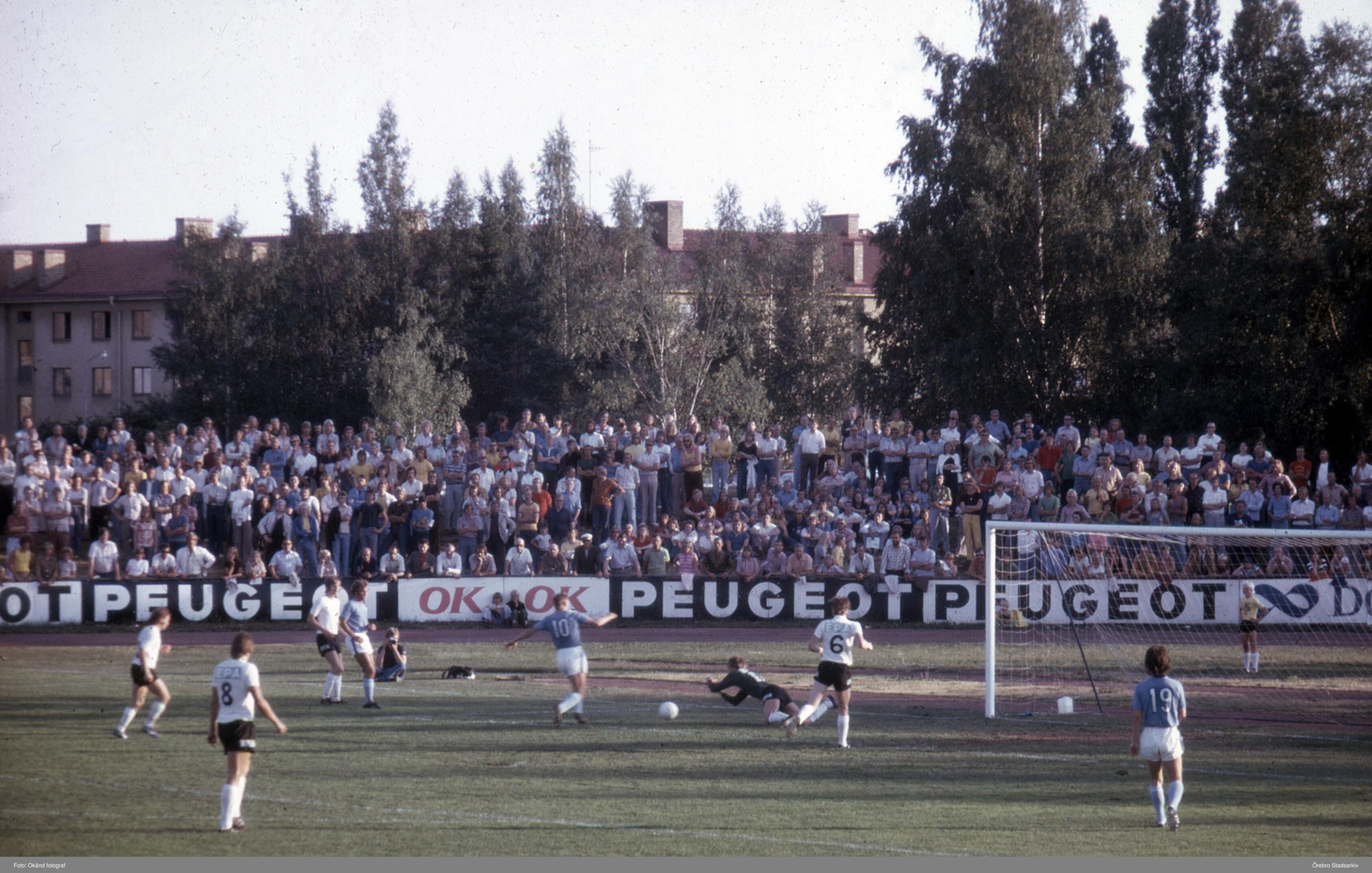
Örebro SK Game In The Late 1970s.

After finishing eighth both in 1963 and in 1964, sixth in 1965 and seventh in 1966, Örebro SK were an established mid table team but in 1967 they won their second bronze medal. After a good start but a poor following season the team had to settle with the fifth spot in 1968 but in 1969 they were close to win Stora Silvret (eng: big silver, runners-up) but just missed after losing the last game of the season. Instead, they finished fifth yet again in the very tight race for silver.

In 1970 the club was close to relegation, but stayed up after defeating the previous year's champions IFK Göteborg 1–0, sending the champions down to Division 2 instead. The game became known as the first instance of hooliganism in Sweden. Disgruntled IFK Göteborg fans stormed the pitch and removed the goal posts. Between 1971 and 1976 were stuck in the mid- to bottom range of Allsvenskan. In 1977 Örebro was close to relegation but secured a continued spell in the top flight in the last game of the season. That only lasted for one more year. After 18 straight seasons in Allsvenskan, Örebro was relegated to Division 2 in 1978.

=== Struggle in the second division (1979–1987) ===
Between 1979 and 1981 the club finished runners-up for three consecutive seasons, losing out to teams like IK Brage and AIK. After losing several players, the 1982 season become a disappointment with ÖSK finishing fifth of Division 2. Before the following season 1983 the board decided to push hard for a comeback to Allsvenskan. The club signed star manager Roy Hodgson, who in the last few years had won two gold medals to Halmstads BK and new players were brought in. However IFK Norrköping and Djurgårdens IF were the stronger teams in a tough second division and Örebro finished third.

In 1984 ÖSK, still managed by Hodgson, won Division 2 North. However, play-off against the runner up of Division 2 South was now required for promotion to Allsvenskan. Mjällby AIF proved too strong and ÖSK lost both games and at the end of the season Hodgson moved to Malmö FF, replaced by fellow Brit Stuart Baxter, who had just retired as a player for ÖSK. After finishing fourth in 1985, the 1986 season was close to end in disaster. The club was only saved from relegation by rivals Västerås SK who defeated Enköpings SK in the final day of the season. A new major attempt to reach Allsvenskan in 1987 including the signing of high-profile coach Rolf Zetterlund ended in disappointment as the club only finished third.

=== The Dahlkvist era – Örebro SK back in the top flight (1988–1999) ===
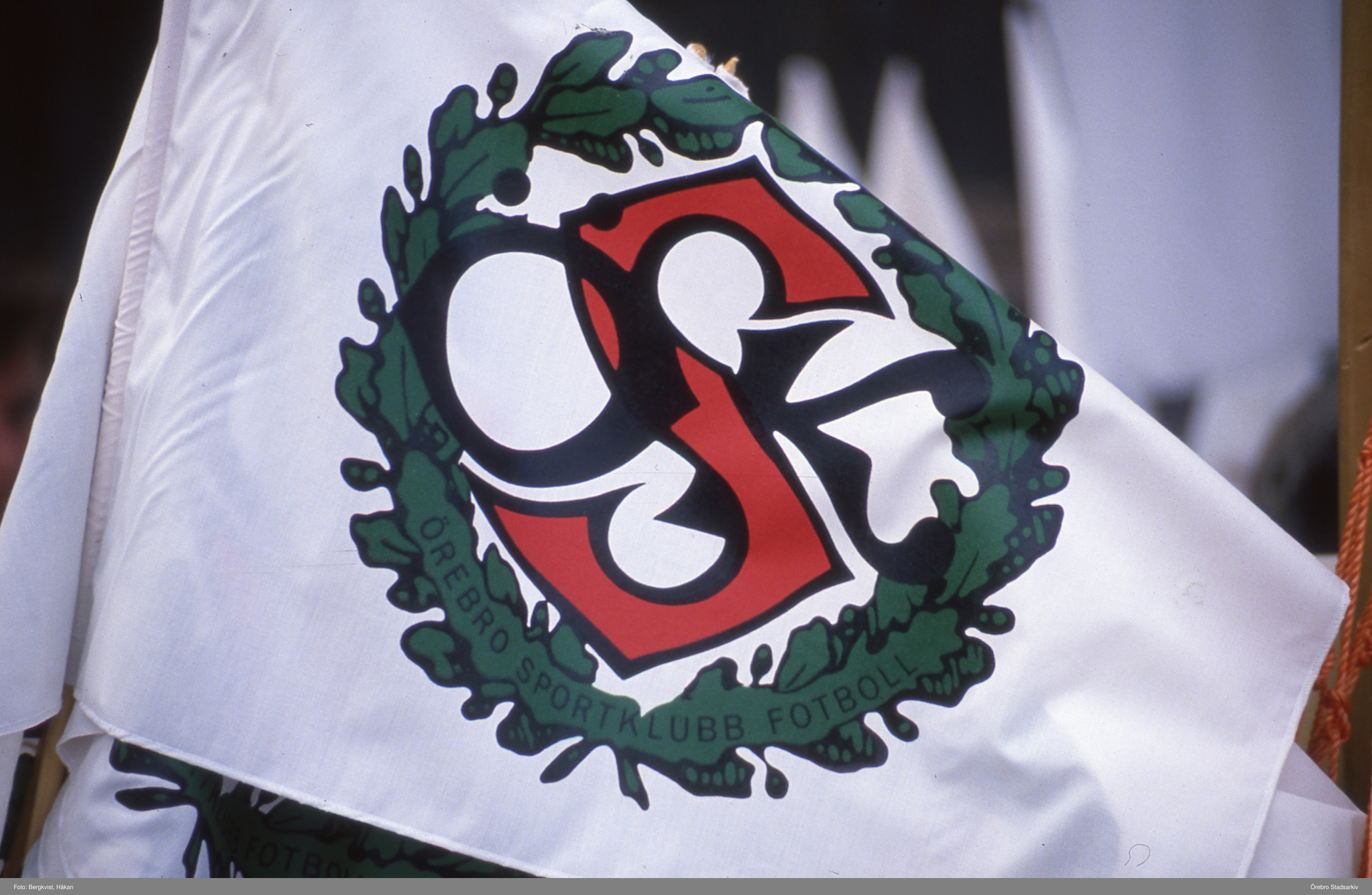
Flag with the ÖSK crest being waved in 1989.

The next attempt in 1988 would be more successful. Before the season, Zetterlund brought Sven Dahlkvist to ÖSK from his former club AIK. Dahlkvist, player of the year in Sweden in 1984, was one of the highest profile signings in club history, and became a club icon as player and coach. Simultaneous with the club's 80th anniversary, ÖSK secured the long-awaited promotion back to Allsvenskan. At the same time Örebro SK Fotboll became independent from Örebro SK and organized as a club focused solely on football. Örebro SK Ungdom was also formed to cater for the junior age groups.

Örebro SK's comeback was successful, and the club immediately established itself as a team subscribing to top positions in Allsvenskan. Already in the first year, ÖSK qualified for the play-offs (fourth) for the championship but lost the semi-final against IFK Norrköping. In 1990 the club was able to yet again reach the semi-finals (finishing third) but this time IFK Göteborg proved too strong in a nerve-racking play-off were IFK Göteborg keeper Thomas Ravelli made one of the saves of his career on a header from the home team captain Sven Dahlkvist.

In 1991 a new league system was introduced. In the new 10-team league, the club finished runners up (second to IFK Göteborg only on goal difference) but dropped to third in the Mästerskapsserien between the top six teams. The strong results of ÖSK were very much thanks to new striker Miroslaw Kubisztal, signed from GKS Katowice in Poland. "Miro" or "Kuba" soon became a big home crowd favourite, and still today the ÖSK fans are called "Kubanerna" as a tribute to the Pole.

The impressive performance in the previous season also earned Örebro its debut in the 1991/1992 UEFA cup. ÖSK were however unfortunate enough to draw champions-to-be Ajax already in the first round. After holding the Dutch team goalless for 60 minutes in the first leg, ÖSK in the end lost 3–0 and then lost 1–0 in the second leg at home.

The following year became a failure as the team did not qualify for Mästerskapsserien but instead had to fight against relegation in Kvalsvenskan. After a bad start where Örebro SK struggled to score Örebro effectively secured continued participation in Allsvenskan after an epic 7–1 win against BK Häcken, finishing second and qualifying for the yet again amended Allsvenskan, as of 1993 consisting of 14 teams and with no play-off for the championship. Örebro also participated in the UEFA cup for the second time, losing a close tie against KV Mechelen (2–1 on aggregate) in the first round.

Coach Zetterlund left the club after the end of the 1992 season, to be replaced by Kent Karlsson. ÖSK looked sharp in the pre-season games, but performed badly when the league season started. Karlsson soon had to leave the coaching job for personal reasons. As replacement, the club brought on Dahlkvist, who had retired after the 1991 season to become technical director of the club, only to make a temporary and highly celebrated comeback in the autumn of 1992. Dahlkvist know had the double role of coach and technical director. The 1993 season however ended with a disappointing 12th spot for Dahlkvist's team, which meant that ÖSK had to enter play-off to against Vasalund/Essinge IF to stay up. The club was able to stay in Allsvenskan on the away goal rule after the first match ended 2–2 and the return game at home 0–0.

Before the 1994 season, Örebro SK only made one player acquisition. However, it proved absolutely crucial. former Anderlecht star Arnor Gudjohnsen was signed from BK Häcken. As an attacking midfielder behind prolific polish striker Miroslaw Kubisztal and starlet Mattias Jonson Gudjohnsen immediately became the architect of the most feared attack in Allsvenskan. 1994 became the best season to date in the club history were the club scored 62 goals and fought for the championship until the dying minute of the season. The day of the season had a spectacular set up; ÖSK, IFK Göteborg and Malmö FF all had the chance to win Allsvenskan, and the latter two played against each other. As Örebro SK won comfortably away against Landskrona Bois, the only result that would snatch the title from the club was an IFK Göteborg win. IFK Göteborg scored a late winner to secure the championship. Örebro in 1994 also became the first Swedish club ever to score in each of the 26 games of the season.

The club didn't reach the same level in 1995 as the year before, even if they were close to win a medal, again failing on the finishing line. The club also made an embarrassing third appearance in the UEFA cup, being disqualified after having used too many foreign players in the preliminary round against Avenir Beggen of Luxembourg. The oversight raised questions over the double role of Dahlkvist as coach and technical director of the club.

After the end of the 1995 season, Mattias Jonsson was signed by Helsingborgs IF and after that became a regular player of the national team. Jonsson was replaced by Dan Sahlin, who was signed from relegated Hammarby. Daniel Tjernström was also brought in from local rival Degerfors IF, doing the prohibited move. Despite a bad start to the 1996 season the club finished fifth after some impressive displays in the second half of the season. 1997 was a mixed season as the club went up and down the table but as so many times the club showed strength in the autumn, earning them a fourth place and the bronze medal. The form of striker Dan Sahlin also earned him the golden boat as top scorer of the league. This year, Örebro again appeared in the UEFA cup, qualifying for the main tournament after knocking out FK Jablonec of the Czech Republic on away goals in the second qualifying round. In the main tournament, Rotor Volgograd of Russia were however too strong, winning 6–1 on aggregate.

The 1998 season started extremely poorly and after six matches the team was bottom of the table, however the team picked up and for a while held second spot, only to end up sixth after having lost their two biggest profiles during the summer break, Arnor Gudjohnsen and top goal scorer Dan Sahlin. The next year, 1999, the club again started poorly but grew stronger over summer. However, as autumn came the form faded and the club had to suffer play-off matches against Assyriska FF and it wasn't until the second match, on extra time, that Örebro was able to win and stay in Allsvenskan. Keeper Anders Karlsson also became the player with most appearances for the club with 373 matches in total. After the 1999 season, Dahlkvist left his position as both coach and technical director after 12 mostly successful years with the club, including the promotion in 1988, the 1994 silver and the medals in 1989, 1990, 1991 and 1997.

=== A new millennium – brand new world with broken dreams (2000–2006) ===
As the new millennium started, Örebro SK was believed to yet again challenge for the top of Allsvenskan after signing inter alia head coach Mats Jingblad from IFK Göteborg and former top scorer Niklas Skoog in 2000 and after beating IF Elfsborg in August, taking the club to a third place in the table, many believed they were on the right track. However, due to a mixture of good and bad results the club finished 10th. At the end of the season, talented home grown artist Mats Rubarth left the club for AIK. The 2001 season was only marginally better with an eighth place, although the club scored the second highest number of goals in the league, after Halmstads BK, entire 48 goals, but the club also conceded 44 balls. In particular, much needed victories ended up in draws after conceding late goals in most games. The club also lost top scorer Skoog to Malmö FF during the summer break. The 2002 on ended with seventh spot despite the lack of previous years goalscoring. After the season Eyravallen went through renovation as the natural turf was replaced by artificial turf and new stands were built. Another inventory of the club was also waived farewell as keeper Anders Karlsson retired after nearly 20 years with the club.

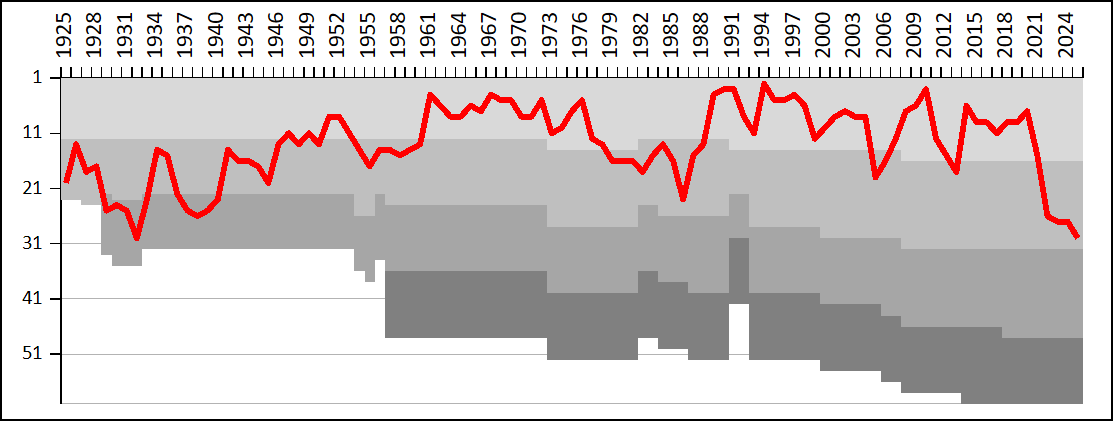
A chart showing the progress of Örebro SK through the Swedish football league system. The different shades of gray represent league divisions.

The 2003 season under new coach Stefan Lundin started well for Örebro, but yet again a poor ending of the season saw the team end up in eighth place. Promising goalkeeper John Alvbåge and Danish veteran Lars Larsen introduced themselves and soon became favourites of the Örebro crowd. The 2004 season became one of the darkest years in club history. First, Örebro had to fight hard to avoid relegation. A heroic effort with five straight wins at the end of the season earned a mid table finishing (seventh, later amended to eighth), but in the end effort proved futile. Economic problems had haunted ÖSK for a period of time as the club faced major deficits. Even after yet another heroic attempt by both supporters and sponsors the club was relegated by Elitlicensnämnden (eng: The Elite license board), who ruled that the balance sheet of the club did not comply with the standards of the Swedish Football Association. Örebro SK's appeal failed and the club was forced to play in Superettan.

ÖSK managed to keep most of its squad for the first season in Superettan, except for keeper John Alvbåge who left for Viborg, and Patrick Walker who had previously been with the club returned as head coach. It was widely expected that the club would quickly return to the top flight in particular after an inspired pre-season. The home crowd also had big expectations, and in fact booed the team despite a 3–0 win against Bodens BK in the first game of the season. That turned out to be the last win for a while. After a terrible spring ÖSK was for a while struggling against relegation. A better autumn secured a fifth spot, but ÖSK were nowhere near promotion. 2006 started off with impressive wins, but the club lost their goal scoring ability in the mid-season. Bosnian Nedim Halilović was brought on from NK Varteks, a signing that proved crucial. Halilović's goal scoring form in the autumn of 2006 brought the club back to the top and after a nerve-racking final day of the season where Örebro beat Assyriska FF 2–1 at the same time as Brommapojkarna lost to Trelleborgs FF, the club was back in Allsvenskan. The win of Assyriska also marked the end of an era. Veteran Thomas Andersson, who had to leave the pitch because of a bleeding injury, made his last performance for the club. After this event, Andersson will forever be remembered as Captain Blood by the club's fans.

=== A fresh restart (2007–) ===
2007 proved a tough come-back season in Allsvenskan. Nedim Halilović could not find the same goal scoring form and the club fought with fellow newly promoted Trellborgs FF and Brommapojkarnas IF against relegation (as the league was extended to 16 teams in the following season, only one team was relegated). After a summer signing of home grown talent Abgar Barsom (previously with city rivals BK Forward) and the sacking of coach Patrick Walker, Örebro's form picked up in the autumn and an epic first away win of the season against Elfsborg secured another year in Allsvenskan.

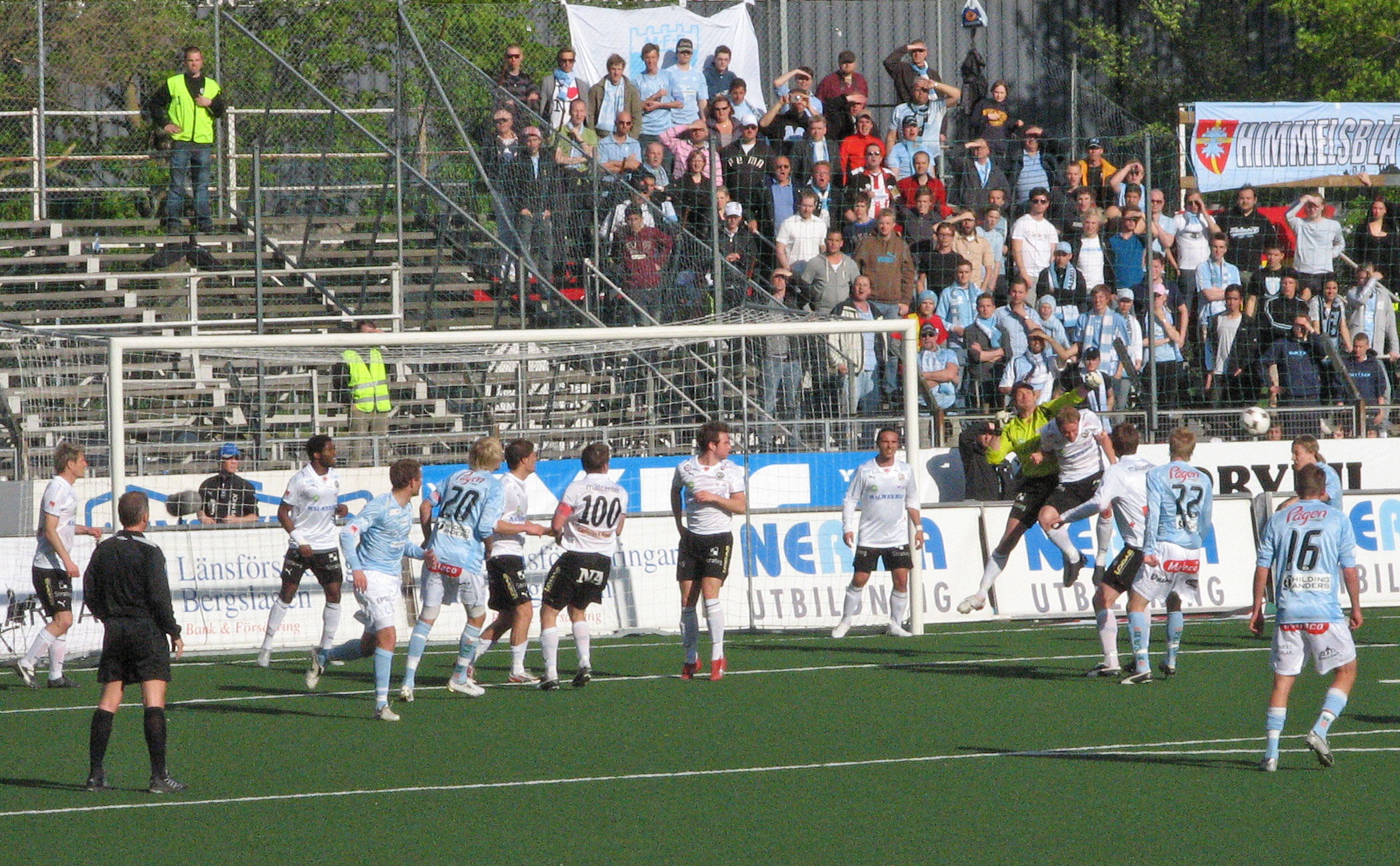
Örebro SK playing against Malmö FF in 2008.

In preparation for the 2008 season, the club's board decided to reshape the club's profile. Finnish-Swedish coach Sixten Boström was brought in, assisted by local Alexander Axen. Profiles like Larsen and Barsom left the club, but two other home grown talents were brought back to town, Magnus Kihlberg and Samuel Wowoah. Boström also showed immediate confidence in the massive talent Nordin Gerzic, who became a regular after having spent most of his first year with the club in 2007 on the bench. Despite some impressive performances, the team struggled to score and lacked a natural target player in the newly adopted 4–3–3 system. Gerzic, a natural midfielder, was often used as center forward during the spring. At the summer break, it looked as if the team would have to fight against relegation yet again. However, in the summer Danish striker Kim Olsen was brought in, which meant that Gerzic could move to the midfield. Former keeper John Alvbåge also made a popular comeback to the team. The new players filled important gaps and Örebro immediately became a winning team. After earning seven points in three games against the top trio IFK Göteborg, Kalmar FF and Elfsborgs IF, relegation was no longer a threat. Being one of the best teams of the second half of the season, Örebro eventually finished seventh.

The successful ending to the 2008 season was carried on to 2009. Several new talented players were brought on the team, including Alejandro Bedoya (whose impressive first season earned him a number of caps for the US in 2010, although he just missed out of the world cup squad), Michael Almebäck and home-grown talent Marcus Astvald (both of which earned selections to the U-21 Sweden squad). After an unlucky start of the season with two losses, Örebro soon joined the top teams and it was only a spell of bad form in the late season that deprived the team of a new medal. Örebro finished sixth.

In 2010, Sixten Boström had the opportunity to work with nearly the same squad as in 2009, with a fresh addition of Paulinho Guara on loan from Korean Busan. Despite a couple of unexpected losses at home in the beginning of the season (against Mjällby and Gasis), there was never a doubt that Örebro would be a top team. Clear losses both away and at home to eventual champions Malmö FF spoiled the chance of a gold, but the impressive and clear late summer home wins against Elfsborg and Helsingborg (both 3–0) revealed potential of the team. The team finished third, owing them "little silver" and a spot in the second qualification round for the 2011-12 UEFA Europa League.

In the summer of 2010, striker Kim Olsen left the team and a number of youngsters were brought on. One of them, Astrit Ajdarevic had an instant impact. He came on as a substitute and scored a late, beautiful equalizer against Elfsborg away, and then scored two goals in the home win. Ajdarevic was however not fit to become a regular starter of the team. Although Örebro wanted to extend Ajdarevic's contract, he received an offer he could not refuse from IFK Norrköping and thus left the team at the end of the season.

The transfer window after the end of the 2010 season became even more hectic. Despite early rumours of an exodus of top players, the only players from the starting line up that left the team were Roni Porokara and Paulinho Guara. And Örebro, with its solid finances, went out on a shopping streak, signing a top player, Valdet Rama, from Hannover 96, former Örebro defender Patrik Haginge, centre-tank Andreas Haddad and young starlets Atashkadeh, Lushtako, Ibrahim, Yasin, Berger and Holmgren.

The 2011 season however did not live up to the high expectations of the fans. Despite often scoring the opening goal, Örebro SK entered into three long losing streaks and ended up in a disappointing 12th spot of allsvenskan, an early exit from the Europa League qualification campaign (against Sarajevo) and finally losing the semifinal of the national cup (against cup and league champions Helsingborgs IF). The initially strong ÖSK squad was diluted throughout the season: centre Andreas Haddad and right fullback Patrik Anttonen missed most of the season through injury, and during summer arguably the two best players of the team, first Mikael Almebäck (to FC Bruges) and Alejandro Bedoya (to Glasgow Rangers) left for modest transfer fees (as their contracts were soon to expire). Shortly before the end of the season, goalkeeper John Alvbåge announced that he was also leaving (for IFK Gothenburg).

In July 2018, Brendan Hines-Ike was transferred to K.V. Kortrijk. The fee was reportedly set at US$750K, making it the biggest sale in the history of Örebro SK and biggest purchase of KV Kortrijk's.

== Players ==
=== Squad ===
As of 4 September 2026

Note: Flags indicate national team as defined under FIFA eligibility rules; some limited exceptions apply. Players may hold more than one non-FIFA nationality.

No.	Pos.	Nation	Player
2	DF	IRQ	Alai Ghasem
3	DF	SWE	Victor Sandberg
4	DF	USA	Erik McCue
5	MF	SWE	Jacob Ortmark
6	MF	SWE	Edwin Ibrahimbegović
7	MF	SWE	Samuel Wikman
8	MF	SWE	Manasse Kusu (on loan from Mjällby)
9	MF	SYR	Antonio Yakoub
10	FW	SWE	Rasmus Wiedesheim-Paul
11	DF	SWE	Christopher Redenstrand
12	MF	SWE	Dino Salihović
14	FW	LBN	Hasan Dana
15	DF	SWE	Lowe Astvald

No.	Pos.	Nation	Player
16	MF	SWE	Hampus Söderström
17	FW	SWE	Kalle Holmberg (captain)
19	DF	KOS	Jetmir Haliti
20	DF	SWE	Max Watson
21	MF	SWE	Fabian Wahlström
22	DF	AUS	Giuseppe Bovalina (on loan from Vancouver Whitecaps)
23	MF	MKD	Erdal Rakip
25	FW	SMA	Chovanie Amatkarijo
30	GK	SWE	Buster Runheim
32	DF	SWE	John Stenberg
75	GK	POL	Jakub Ojrzyński
99	FW	IRQ	Ahmed Yasin

=== Out on loan ===
Note: Flags indicate national team as defined under FIFA eligibility rules; some limited exceptions apply. Players may hold more than one non-FIFA nationality.

No. / Pos. / Nation / Player; 18 / FW / SWE / Erman Hrastovina (at Umeå FC until 30 November 2026)	No. / Pos. / Nation / Player; 23 / FW / SWE / Kim Dickson (at AFC Malmö until 30 November 2026)

== Coaches ==
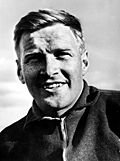
Orvar Bergmark

- (Hungary) Kálmán Konrád (1939–42)
- (Sweden) Harry Magnusson (1942–44)
- (Sweden) Erik Östling (1944–45)
- (Germany) Werner Löwenthal (1945–47)
- (Sweden) Harry Magnusson (1947–48)
- (Sweden) Gösta Dunker (1948–49)
- (Sweden) Gösta Dunker and Sten Dahl (1949–50)
- (Sweden) Per Kaufeldt (1950–51)
- (Sweden) Widorf Pettersson (1951–52)
- (Sweden) Widorf Pettersson and (Sweden) Bertil Nordahl (1952–53)
- (England) Frank Soo (1953–54)
- (Sweden) Gösta Lindh (1954–55)
- (Sweden) Widorf Pettersson (1955–56)
- (Sweden) Harry Magnusson (1956–57)
- (Sweden) Åke Engvall and (England) Billy Burnikell (1957–58)
- (Sweden) Orvar Bergmark and (England) Billy Burnikell (1958–59)
- (Sweden) Orvar Bergmark (1960–61)
- (Austria) Karl Neschy (1962)
- (Hungary) Vilmos Varszegi (1963–64)
- (Sweden) Gösta Lindh (1965–66)
- (Sweden) Lennart Samuelsson (1967–71)
- (Sweden) Orvar Bergmark (1971–73)
- (Sweden) Tord Grip (1974–75)
- (Sweden) Benny Lennartsson (1975–77)
- (Sweden) Benny Lennartsson and (Sweden) Orvar Bergmark (1978)
- (Sweden) Tord Grip (1979–80)
- (Sweden) Kenneth Rosén (1980–82)
- (England) Roy Hodgson (1983–85)
- (England) Stuart Baxter (1985)
- (Sweden) Arvi Taaler and Milan Stojanović (1986)
- (Sweden) Rolf Zetterlund (1987–92)
- (Sweden) Kent Karlsson and (Sweden) Sven Dahlkvist (1993)
- (Sweden) Sven Dahlkvist (1994–99)
- (Sweden) Mats Jingblad (2000–02)
- (Sweden) Stefan Lundin (2003–04)
- (Republic of Ireland) Pat Walker (2005–06)
- (Republic of Ireland) Pat Walker and (Sweden) Urban Hammar (2007)
- (Finland) Sixten Boström (2008–2012)
- (Sweden) Per-Ola Ljung (2012–2014)
- (Sweden) Alexander Axén (2014–2017)
- (Sweden) Axel Kjäll (2017–2021)
- (Portugal) Vítor Gazimba (2021)
- (Sweden) Marcus Lantz (2021)
- (Sweden) Joel Cedergren (2022)
- (Sweden) Axel Kjäll (2022)
- (Sweden) Christian Järdler (2022–present)

== Achievements ==
=== League ===
- Allsvenskan
  - Runners-up (2): 1991, 1994
- Superettan
  - Runners-up (2): 2006, 2013
- Division 1 Norra:
  - Winners: 1988

=== Cups ===
- Svenska Cupen:
  - Runners-up (2): 1987–1988, 2014–2015

== European record ==
- Q= Qualifying

UEFA Cup/UEFA Europa League

Season	Round	Opponents	Home leg	Away leg	Aggregate
1991–92	1	(Netherlands) Ajax	0–1	0–3	0–4
1992–93	1	(Belgium) KV Mechelen	0–0	1–2	1–2
1995–96	Q	(Luxembourg) Avenir Beggen	0–0	0–3	0–3
1997–98	Q2	(Czech Republic) FK Jablonec	0–0	1–1	1–1 (a)
1997–98	1	(Russia) Rotor Volgograd	1–4	0–2	1–6
2011–12	Q2	(Bosnia and Herzegovina) FK Sarajevo	0–0	0–2	0–2
