= Gamla Ullevi =

Football stadium in Gothenburg, Sweden

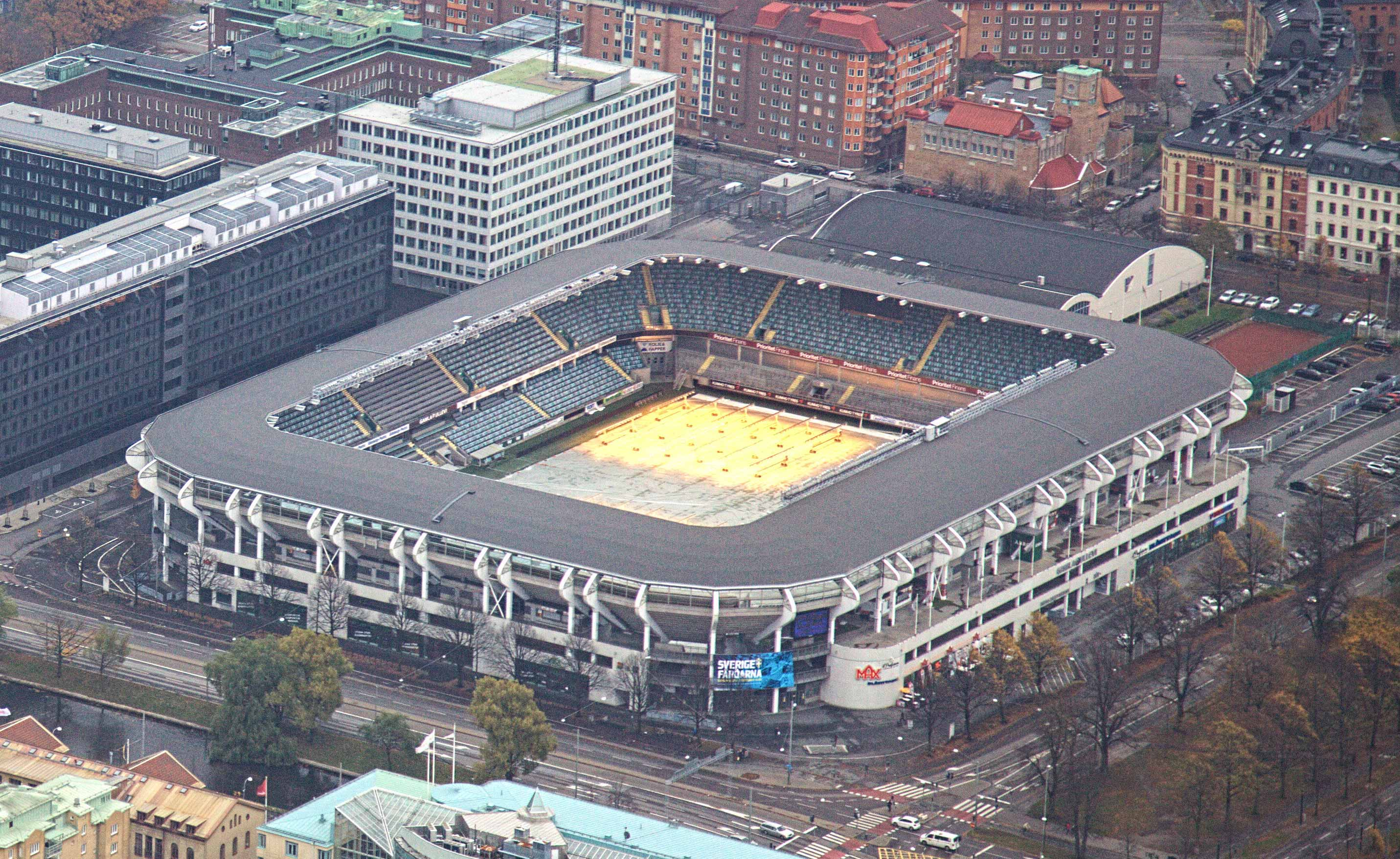
- Aerial view of the stadium in 2013
- Interactive map of Gamla Ullevi
- Location: Gothenburg, Sweden
- Coordinates: 57.7062°N 11.9801°E
- Owner: Gothenburg Municipality
- Operator: Municipal company in cooperation with tenant clubs
- Capacity: 18,416, of which 15,000 are seated and 3,416 are standing (2,400 on a combined sitting/standing terrace)
- Surface: SIS Stitched pitch
- Field size: 105 x 68 m

Construction
- Groundbreaking: 9 January 2007
- Built: Spring 2007 – 30 November 2008
- Opened: 5 April 2009
- Cost: SEK 335 million (estimated)
- Architect: Lars Iwdal (Arkitektbyrån)
- Project manager: Jan-Åke Johansson (Higabgruppen)
- Main contractor: Higabgruppen

Tenants
- GAIS (2009–); IFK Göteborg (2009–); Örgryte IS (2009–2013, 2015–); BK Häcken (2014–2015); Sweden women's national football team (2009–)

Gamla Ullevi (Swedish pronunciation: [ˈɡâmːla ˈɵ̂lːɛˌviː], lit. 'Old Ullevi') is a football stadium in Gothenburg, Sweden, that opened on 5 April 2009. The stadium replaced the city's previous main football stadium, also called Gamla Ullevi, and is the home ground of GAIS, IFK Göteborg and Örgryte IS. It is also the national stadium for the Sweden women's national football team. The new stadium was built on the ground of the now-demolished old stadium. The construction of the stadium was surrounded by controversy, regarding the cost of the project, the alleged low standard of the finished stadium, as well as its name.

The first competitive match at the stadium on 5 April 2009 was also an Allsvenskan derby between Örgryte IS and GAIS, attracting 17,531 spectators. GAIS won, 5–1. The current attendance record of 18,276 was, however, set about a week later when IFK Göteborg played their first game at Gamla Ullevi against Djurgårdens IF. The stadium hosted the 2021 UEFA Women's Champions League Final between Chelsea and Barcelona.

== History ==
=== Background ===
The three clubs of the Gothenburg Alliance (Göteborgsalliansen)—GAIS, IFK Göteborg and Örgryte IS—played the majority of their matches on the old Gamla Ullevi from its inauguration in 1916 until the newer Ullevi stadium was completed in 1958 for the 1958 World Cup in Sweden. From that year most matches were played on the large stadium with a capacity of over 40,000, but as the attendance numbers decreased in the 1980s and early 1990s, and in connection with the removal of the terraces, calls for a move back to the old stadium was heard. After a renovation, Gamla Ullevi was from 1992 once again the home of the Alliance clubs.

But playing in a stadium built almost 100 years ago was not ideal, lacking in service capacity, security, and architecture, the terraces having poles obscuring the view for the audience. Propositions for a modernisation of either of the two Ullevi stadiums, or construction of a new stadium were revealed in April 2002. Four different plans were presented; construction of movable seating on the short ends of Ullevi, two different ideas for renovation and expansion of Gamla Ullevi, or to demolish Gamla Ullevi and construct a new arena on that site.

Other propositions in 2002 and 2003 included building a new stadium in Mölndal, a neighbour municipality of Gothenburg, a new stadium built on the site of the old stadium Valhalla IP, located between Ullevi and Scandinavium, and a third suggestion wanted to demolish Gamla Ullevi and move all football activities to the larger Ullevi which would be rebuilt to a dome arena, with a rotatable pitch that would move it closer to the seats for regular season matches.

Another plan was revealed in January 2005, and proposed a giant sport complex on the site of Valhalla IP, having both a football stadium (28,000 seats) with a retractable roof and an ice hockey arena (12,000 seats) built wall to wall, sharing several components such as pubs and restaurants. The cost was calculated to 700 million SEK, and the complex would be owned by the three football clubs and the largest hockey club in the city, Frölunda HC.

=== Decision ===
The proposition that was decided to be used was to demolish Gamla Ullevi and to build a new stadium on the grounds of the old. Municipal commissioner Göran Johansson presented his plan for the new football stadium at the site of Gamla Ullevi—and the idea to make it the national stadium for the women's national team—to the contractor Higabgruppen, and in early 2005 architect Lars Iwdal got a confidential assignment from Higabgruppen to create a first sketch of the new stadium. Lars Iwdal said in a newspaper interview that

the fact that it was an arena for women's football was Göran's way to get the municipality on the project.

The Gothenburg Alliance had their annual meeting on 6 April 2005 and the board decided to support the plan, and on the 9 April the municipal board of Gothenburg arranged a press conference to show the plans. The new stadium, inspired amongst others by NRGi Park in Aarhus, Aalborg Stadion in Aalborg and mainly Brøndby Stadion in Copenhagen, was to have a capacity of 16,000–18,000 and have open corners; the construction cost was estimated to 180 million SEK for the stadium and a total of 240 million SEK including commercial areas in and around it.

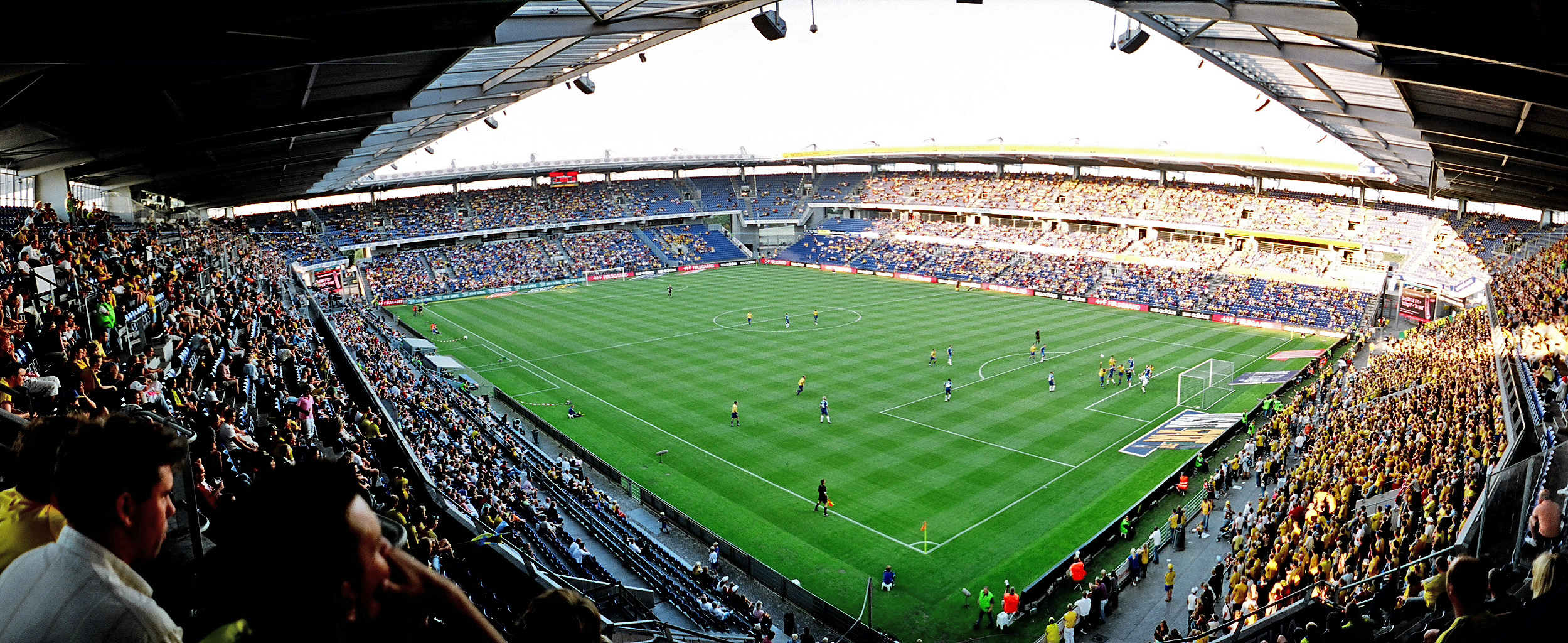
Brøndby Stadion of Brøndby IF in Copenhagen seen during a match in 2006, was the main, among several, source of inspiration for Nya Gamla Ullevi.

The debate in the media following the press conference was mostly about the open corners, if the surface should be grass or artificial turf, and what the name of the stadium should be. The contractor, Higabgruppen, were reluctant to close the corners of the stadium, claiming a very tight budget and possible growth problems for the grass if that was chosen as surface. The original plan was to demolish Gamla Ullevi after the 2005 season, and to open the new stadium at the beginning of the 2007 season, but the plan was delayed and Gamla Ullevi was not torn down in 2005.

Instead, new plans called for the demolishing of the old stadium a few matchdays before the end of the 2006 season on 1 October 2006, but paperwork once again postponed the start and the demolishing of the old stadium started several months later on 9 January 2007. This also delayed the construction which was planned to be finished for the start of the 2008 season in April, but the new schedule indicated that the stadium would not be finished until the autumn of 2008, probably around September or October. As the Swedish football season ends in late October or early November, it was decided that the few matches left of the season would not be played on the new stadium, and that the official opening would not take place until the start of the 2009 season.

=== Construction ===
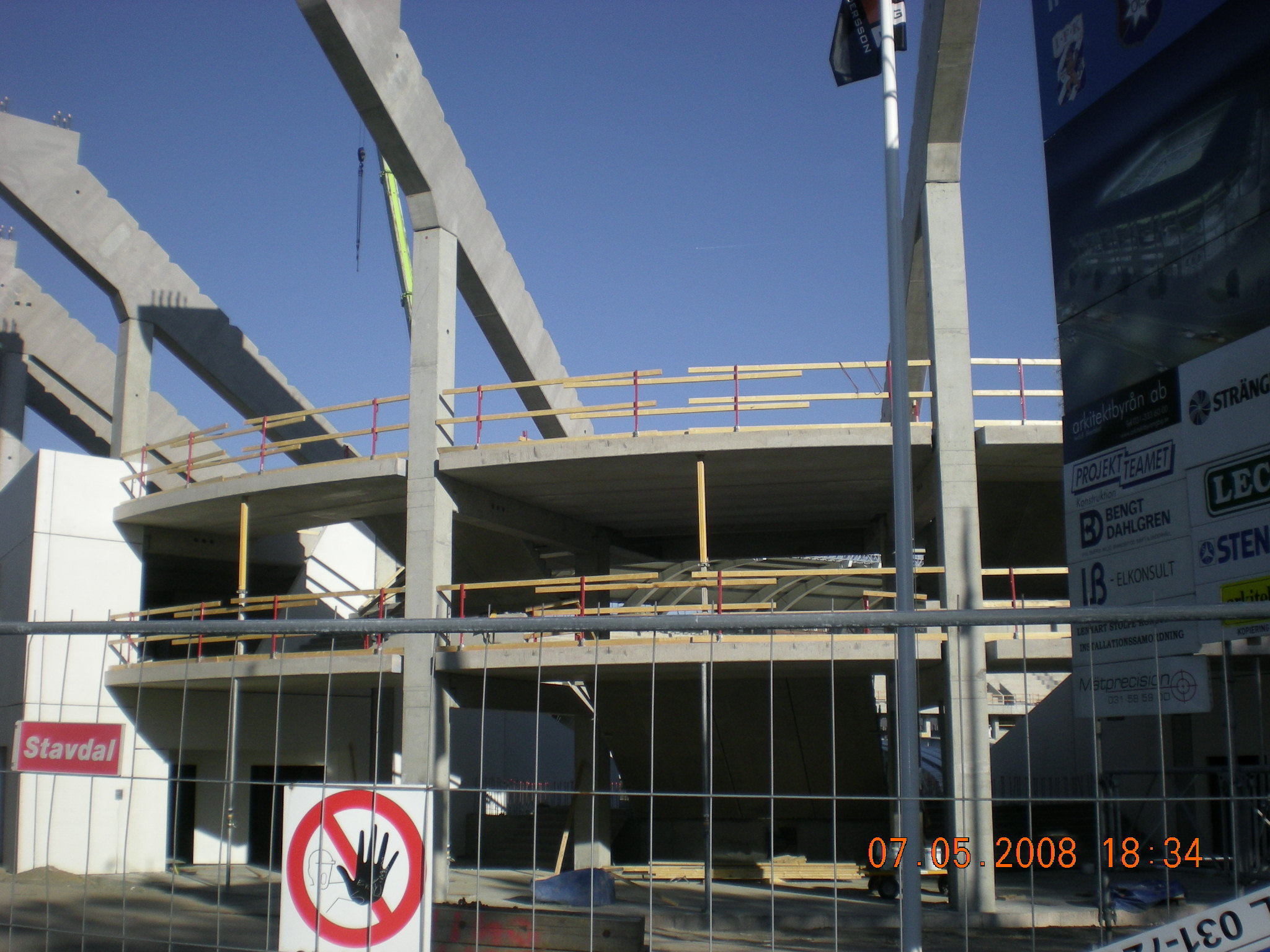
Stadium under construction in May 2008.

The final plan of the stadium and its facilities was settled in December 2006 and included several improvements compared to the early plans presented in 2005. The total budget of 240 million SEK that was said to have been very tight had been increased to 270 million SEK, which amongst several additions allowed for the construction of closed corners. The original plans aimed for a capacity of 17,800 divided on 14,000 seats—of which 2,400 seats can be transformed to terraces if needed—and a terrace capacity of 3,800. The stadium was also planned to feature two large TV screens and 2,500 m^{2} of commercial space and a 900 m^{2} lounge with 18 private boxes.

There will be no retractable roof—only roof over the stands—as the cost for that alone would be 300 million SEK, more than the original projected cost of the whole stadium itself, but there is a possibility to build such in the future if there is need for it. Nya Gamla Ullevi will also have natural grass on the pitch since the stadium will host matches of the 2009 European U-21 Championship, where all matches must be played on grass. As with a retractable roof, there is a possibility to change to artificial turf in the future. There are also some concerns that the natural grass may not grow very well since the closed corners and high stand prevent wind and sun to reach the pitch.

During construction, two of the clubs which previously had Gamla Ullevi as their home stadium, GAIS and IFK Göteborg, played at the much larger Ullevi stadium, while the third club of the Alliance, Örgryte IS, played on Valhalla IP. It was originally said that Nya Gamla Ullevi would be officially opened with a match played between an Alliance team—featuring players from the three Alliance clubs just like when Gamla Ullevi was reopened in 1992—and the Sweden national team or a European top club. Later it was proposed that the women's national team might play the opening match, with an Alliance team playing a second opening match. Nya Gamla Ullevi will be only the second Swedish top league stadium built since 1966, after Borås Arena that was opened in 2005.

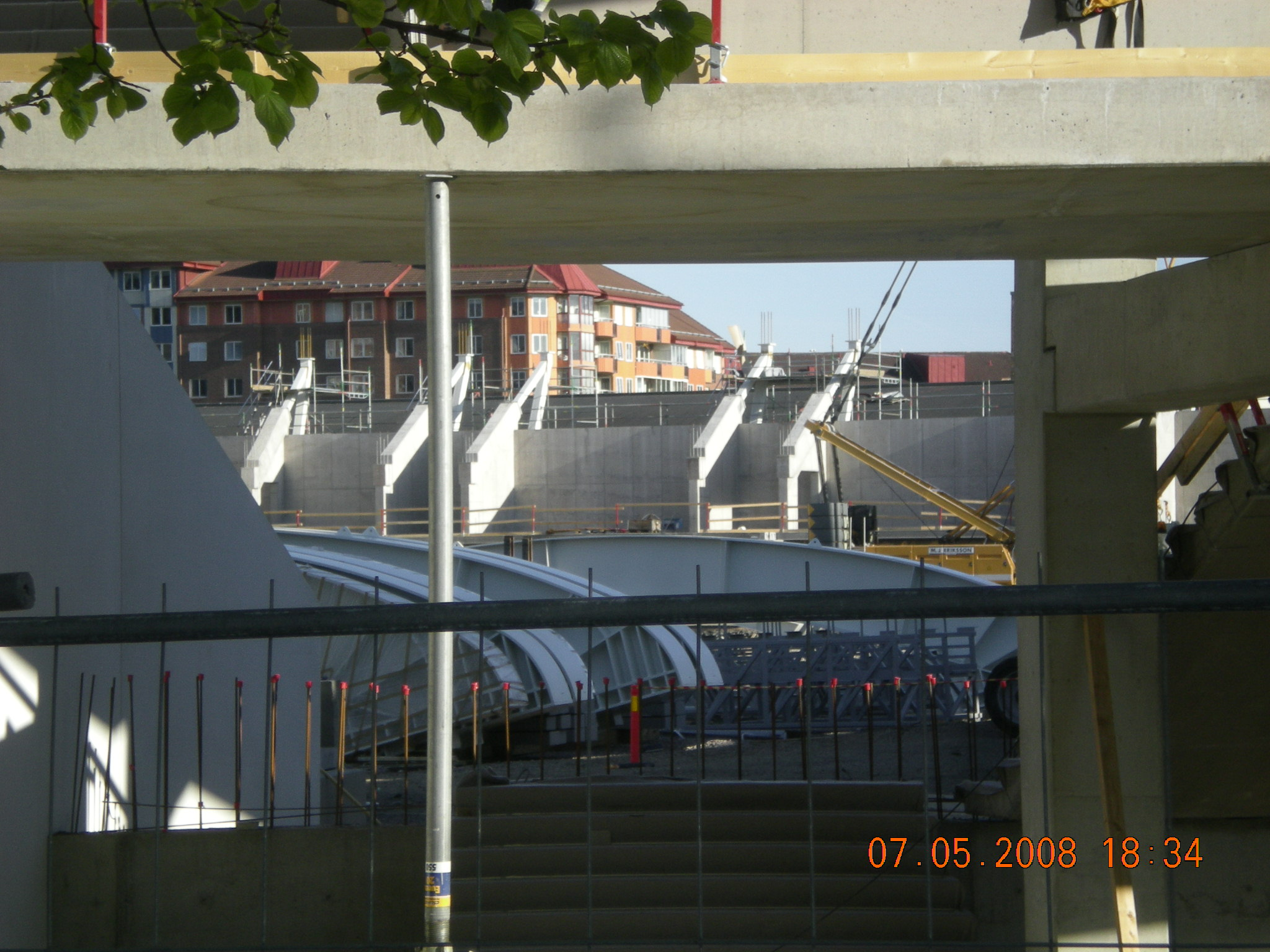
Three roof beams placed inside the stadium awaiting installation.

The construction proceeded as planned and work on the foundations was finished by January 2008 according to the project manager Jan-Åke Johansson from Higabgruppen. He also stated that the stadium's walls and roof would be finished by August 2008—except for the southwestern corner which would remain open a bit longer to allow construction vehicles and cranes to move in and out—and that only interior work would be left to do at that point. The calculated cost for the stadium had at the same time risen to at least 335 million SEK excluding commercial areas and possibly even more than that when finished in 2009. Compared to the 180 million SEK which was the calculated cost for the original plans, the newer and somewhat modified plans have increased the cost by 86 percent.

Some of the original specifications have changed over the time as well, the 900 m^{2} lounge was expanded to 1,100 m^{2} and nine additional private boxes were added to the original 18. Even the capacity has changed, as it was discovered during the installation of the seats—coloured light green and grey, a somewhat controversial decision given the colours of the three clubs that will be playing on the stadium—that more than planned could be fitted, which would allow room for another 1,000 seated spectators and thus extending the capacity to 18,800. The construction work has not seen any major complications and the stadium was planned to be completed by 30 November 2008.

The final inspection and the grass pitch installation was begun on 4 December, and the only remaining work on the stadium itself at that date was the furnishing of the commercial spaces and other complementary installments. On 13–14 December the three Alliance clubs arranges an open house weekend where supporters can inspect the stadium in person. The opening match has yet to be decided, but the options have been radically reduced since IFK director of sports Håkan Mild ruled out the alternative of an Alliance team playing against a national team or a European top club, and as the plan of an opening match involving the women's national team was discarded.

=== Naming ===
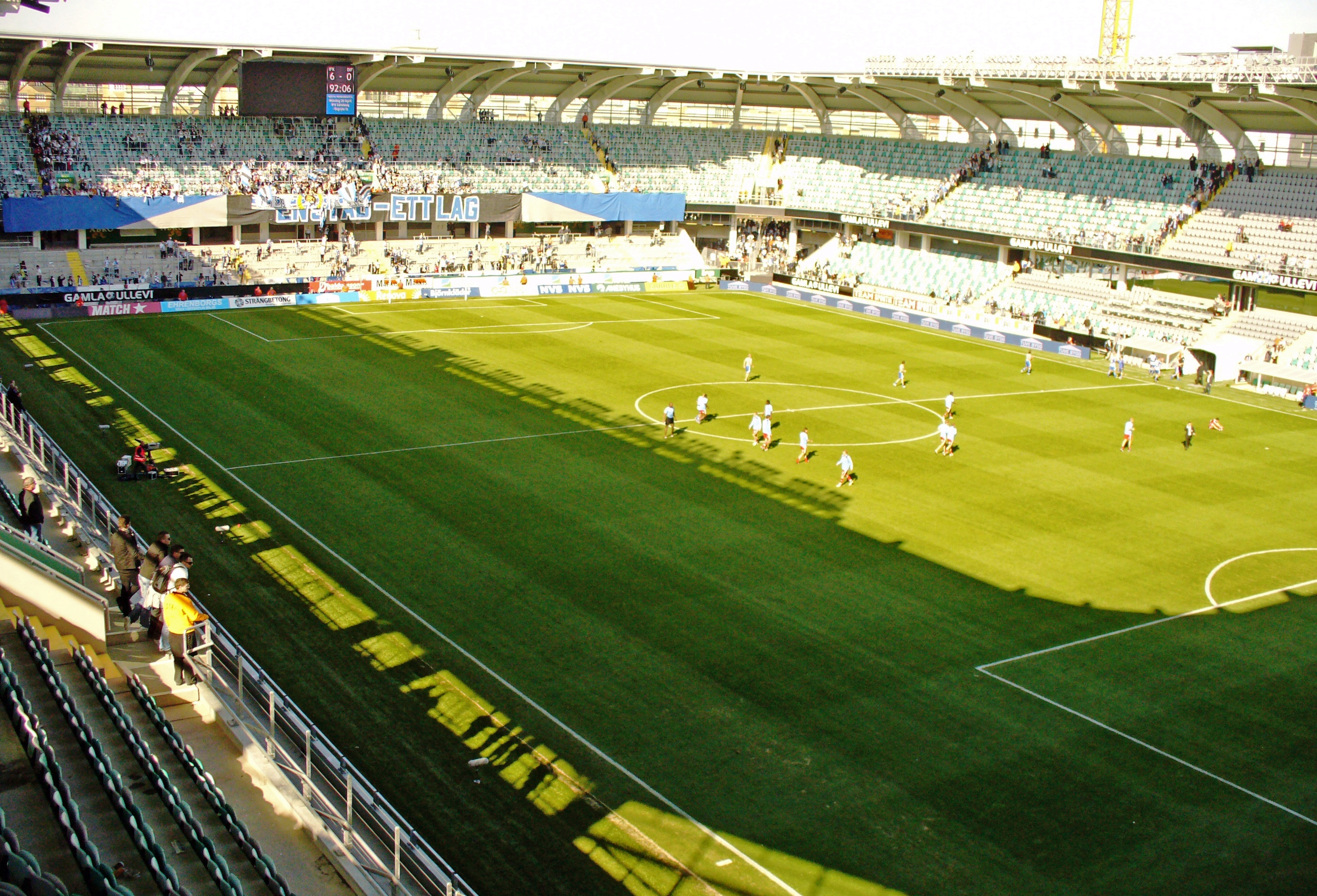
Gamla Ullevi inside.

The name that was used at the first press conference about the new stadium was Nya Gamla Ullevi—meaning New Old Ullevi, a play on the name of the previous two main stadiums of the city, Gamla Ullevi and (Nya) Ullevi—but it was also said that it was only a temporary name and that the final name of the stadium would not likely include the word "Ullevi" as it would possibly be even more confusing than before. The contractor, Higabgruppen, used another name for the project, "Fotbollsarenan" ("The Football Arena"). An early name discussed was Gunnar Grens Arena, named after Gunnar Gren, one of the best Swedish footballers in history and a player that played for all three of the Alliance clubs, and who has already been honoured with a statue outside the old stadium. Other suggestions included Victoria Arena and Gothia Arena, but the clubs were also willing to sell the name of the stadium to a company to generate an extra source of income.

Another alternative that had been discussed and which gained support by all sides—ruling politicians, politicians in opposition, involved organisations and the general public—as time had passed was to let the new stadium take over Ullevi's name, and in turn rename that stadium to something else, possibly including "Göteborg", "Gothia" or "Gothenburg" in the name. On 8 September 2008, the final decision on the naming of the stadium was given to Sture Allén—member and former secretary of the Swedish Academy and retired professor in computational linguistics—in cooperation with the municipal naming committee. Their decision was presented on 1 October 2008 and supported the idea of naming the stadium Gamla Ullevi, the name used by the demolished stadium formerly located on the same place. The proposed name was then approved by the municipal executive committee on 15 October 2008. A plan to sell the names of the four main stands to four companies was also presented.

The name Ullevi itself consists of two parts. The first part of the name, "Ulle-" is the genitive form of Ullr (Swedish: Ull or Uller) which is one of the Æsir—a god in Norse paganism—associated with traits such as skiing, archery, hunting and justice, all connected to sports in one way or another. The second part of the name, "-vi" is a generic term used in several Swedish place names that refers to a shrine, a sacred place or a thing. The name thus means something along the lines of "Ullr's shrine". There is another large stadium in the Nordic countries named after Ullr, the national stadium of the Norway national football team, Ullevaal.

== Controversy ==
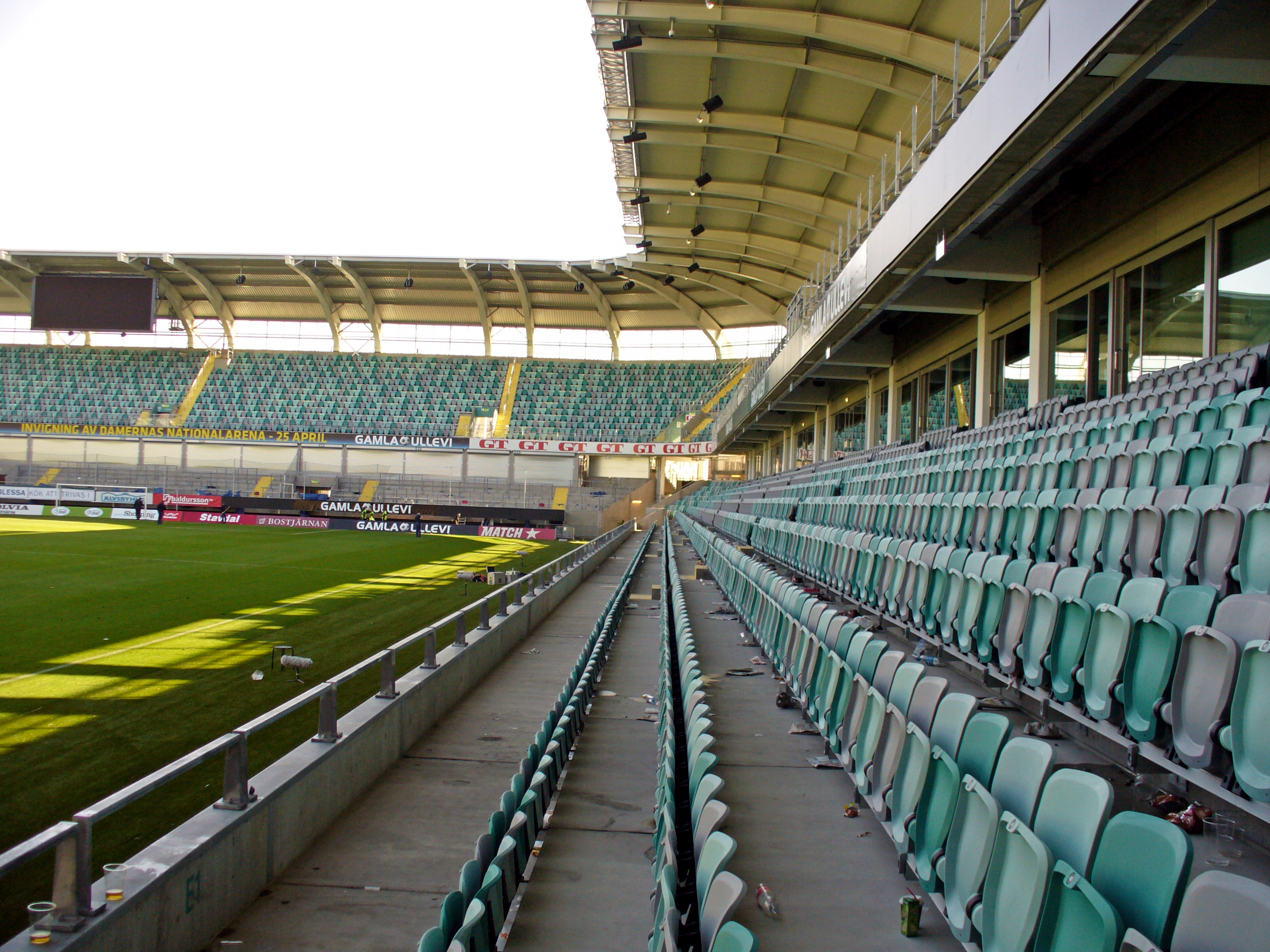
Gamla Ullevi straight.

The entire decision-making process surrounding the stadium, including its design and cost, was heavily criticised, both by supporters, media and the political opposition in Gothenburg. Points of criticism included the big mystery making and hastiness around the decision, the lack of visions including the tight budget, and the involvement of too much politics in the process. Some of the criticism was addressed: the budget was increased slightly to allow closed corners, but several issues were never discussed. One such issue was having Brøndby Stadion as an inspiration for the stadium, since this arena later had to go through an overhaul since the commercial areas were deemed insufficient.

Football expert and former editor of the football magazine Offside, Mattias Göransson, called the stadium an "amateur construction" which would lead to future conflicts, mentioning amongst other things the lack of restaurants, office space and parking garage. The chairman at the time, Anders Almgren, of the largest supporters' association in Gothenburg—Supporterklubben Änglarna supporting IFK Göteborg—wrote in a column that

the stadium currently on the drawing board, is in my eyes not good enough. It has a standard that at least the way I see it is equivalent to a stadium built in the 80s.

== All matches played by Sweden women's national team ==
Date	Opponent	Score	Attendance	Competition
25 April 2009	Brazil	3–1	12,257	Friendly
23 September 2009	Belgium	2-1	3,367	2011 FIFA Women's World Cup qualification
19 June 2010	Czech Republic	0-0	4,244	2011 FIFA Women's World Cup qualification
23 June 2010	Azerbaijan	17-0	3,206	2011 FIFA Women's World Cup qualification
11 September 2010	Denmark	2-1	1,567	2011 FIFA Women's World Cup qualification – UEFA play-offs
16 June 2011	Mexico	2-0	4,512	Friendly
20 June 2012	Japan	0-1	5,183	Volvo Winners Cup
15 September 2012	Netherlands	2-1	1,265	Friendly
10 July 2013	Denmark	1-1	16,128	UEFA Women's Euro 2013
13 July 2013	Finland	5-0	16,414	UEFA Women's Euro 2013
16 July 2013	Italy	3–1	7,288	UEFA Women's Euro 2013
24 July 2013	Germany	0-1	16,608	UEFA Women's Euro 2013
31 October 2013	Faroe Islands	5-0	4,411	2015 FIFA Women's World Cup qualification
13 September 2014	Bosnia and Herzegovina	3–0	6,664	2015 FIFA Women's World Cup qualification
17 September 2014	Scotland	2-0	9,104	2015 FIFA Women's World Cup qualification
22 September 2015	Poland	3-0	5,460	UEFA Women's Euro 2017 qualifying
27 October 2015	Denmark	1-0	11,244	UEFA Women's Euro 2017 qualifying
6 June 2016	Moldova	6-0	9,168	UEFA Women's Euro 2017 qualifying
15 September 2016	Slovakia	2-1	11,460	UEFA Women's Euro 2017 qualifying
21 October 2016	Iran	7-0	1,736	Friendly
8 June 2017	United States	0-1	10,011	Friendly
7 June 2018	Croatia	4-0	8,092	2019 FIFA Women's World Cup qualification
30 August 2018	Ukraine	3-0	6,175	2019 FIFA Women's World Cup qualification
31 May 2019	South Korea	1-0	6,854	Friendly
8 October 2019	Slovakia	7-0	9,748	UEFA Women's Euro 2022 qualifying
17 September 2020	Hungary	8-0		UEFA Women's Euro 2022 qualifying
22 October 2020	Latvia	7-0		UEFA Women's Euro 2022 qualifying
27 October 2020	Iceland	2-0		UEFA Women's Euro 2022 qualifying
21 September 2021	Georgia	4-0	2,723	2023 FIFA Women's World Cup qualification
25 November 2021	Finland	2-1	13,429	2023 FIFA Women's World Cup qualification
12 April 2022	Republic of Ireland	1-1	12,123	2023 FIFA Women's World Cup qualification
11 October 2022	France	3-0	15,098	Friendly
11 April 2023	Norway	3-3	10,472	Friendly
22 September 2023	Spain	2-3	16,114	2023–24 UEFA Women's Nations League
27 October 2023	Switzerland	1-0	13,123	2023–24 UEFA Women's Nations League
9 April 2024	France	0-1	11,278	UEFA Women's Euro 2025 qualifying
16 July 2024	England	0-0	16,789	UEFA Women's Euro 2025 qualifying

== See also ==
Preceded by Anoeta Stadium; San Sebastián	UEFA Women's Champions League; Final venue 2021	Succeeded by Juventus Stadium; Turin
