= Joel Cedergren =

Swedish footballer and manager

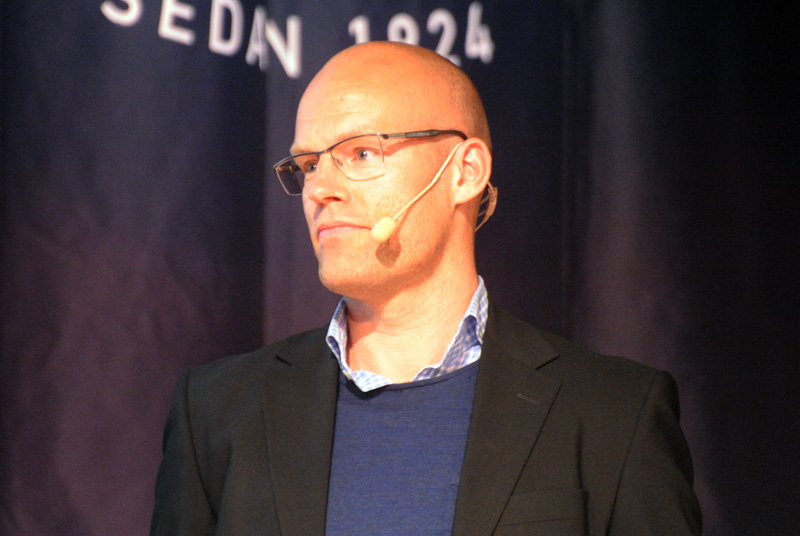

Personal information
- Full name: John Joel Cedergren
- Date of birth: 22 July 1974 (age 52)
- Place of birth: Sweden
- Position: Midfielder

Senior career*
Years	Team	Apps	(Gls)
1992–1993	IFK Mora		
1994–1998	IK Brage	105	(4)
1999	Halmstads BK	3	(0)
2000–2004	GIF Sundsvall	110	(1)
2005–2006	Sogndal	22	(1)
2007–2008	GIF Sundsvall	44	(0)
Total		284	(6)

Managerial career
- 2013–2019: GIF Sundsvall
- * Club domestic league appearances and goals

Joel Cedergren (born 22 July 1974) is a Swedish football manager and former player who most recently managed GIF Sundsvall.
