= 2025 Malmö FF season =

Football season

Malmö FF
2025 season
- Chairman: Anders Pålsson
- Head coach: Henrik Rydström (until 26 September); Anes Mravac (from 26 September)
- Stadium: Eleda Stadion
- Allsvenskan: 6th
- 2024–25 Svenska Cupen: Runners-up
- 2025–26 Svenska Cupen: Quarter-final
- 2025–26 UEFA Champions League: Third qualifying round
- 2025–26 UEFA Europa League: League phase, 35th
- Top goalscorer: League: Hugo Bolin (6); All: Sead Hakšabanović (8)
- Average home league attendance: 18,706
Home colours	Away colours	Third colours

The 2025 season is Malmö FF's 114th in existence, their 90th season in Allsvenskan and their 25th consecutive season in the league. They are competing in Allsvenskan, the 2024–25 Svenska Cupen, the 2025–26 Svenska Cupen, the 2025–26 UEFA Champions League and the 2025–26 UEFA Europa League.

== Players ==
=== Squad ===
Note: Flags indicate national team as defined under FIFA eligibility rules; some limited exceptions apply. Players may hold more than one non-FIFA nationality.

No.	Pos.	Nation	Player
1	GK	BRA	Ricardo Friedrich
2	DF	SWE	Johan Karlsson
5	DF	MNE	Andrej Đurić
6	MF	SWE	Oscar Lewicki
7	MF	SWE	Otto Rosengren
8	FW	ISL	Arnór Sigurðsson
9	FW	SWE	Isaac Kiese Thelin
10	MF	DEN	Anders Christiansen (captain)
11	FW	SWE	Emmanuel Ekong
13	DF	SWE	Martin Olsson
15	MF	GUI	Salifou Soumah
16	MF	NOR	Oliver Berg
17	DF	DEN	Jens Stryger
18	DF	SWE	Pontus Jansson
19	DF	NOR	Colin Rösler
20	FW	NOR	Erik Botheim

No.	Pos.	Nation	Player
21	MF	SWE	Stefano Vecchia
22	MF	SWE	Taha Ali
23	MF	NOR	Lasse Berg Johnsen
25	DF	BRA	Gabriel Busanello
27	GK	SWE	Johan Dahlin
29	FW	MNE	Sead Hakšabanović
30	GK	SWE	Joakim Persson
30	GK	SWE	Robin Olsen
32	FW	ISL	Daníel Guðjohnsen
33	GK	SWE	Melker Ellborg
34	MF	SWE	Zakaria Loukili
35	DF	SWE	Nils Zätterström
37	DF	SWE	Adrian Skogmar
38	MF	SWE	Hugo Bolin
40	MF	SWE	Kenan Busuladžić
43	MF	SWE	Gentian Lajqi

=== Players in/out ===
==== In ====
No.	Pos.	Nat.	Name	Age	Moving from	Type	Transfer window	Ends	Transfer fee	Source
2	DF	(Sweden)	Johan Karlsson	23	Kalmar FF	Transfer	Winter	2028		mff.se
11	MF	(Sweden)	Emmanuel Ekong	22	Empoli (Italy)	Transfer	Winter	2029		mff.se
8	MF	(Iceland)	Arnór Sigurðsson	25	Blackburn Rovers (England)	Transfer	Winter	2027		mff.se
30	GK	(Sweden)	Robin Olsen	35	Aston Villa (England)	Transfer	Summer	2029		mff.se
5	DF	(Montenegro)	Andrej Đurić	21	Crvena zvezda (Serbia)	Transfer	Summer	2029		mff.se
15	MF	(Guinea)	Salifou Soumah	21	Zira (Azerbaijan)	Transfer	Summer	2029		mff.se

==== Out ====
No.	Pos.	Nat.	Name	Age	Moving to	Type	Transfer window	Transfer fee	Source
5	MF	(Denmark)	Søren Rieks	37	Retired	End of contract	Winter		mff.se
4	DF	(Finland)	Niklas Moisander	39	Retired	End of contract	Winter		mff.se
8	MF	(Peru)	Sergio Peña	29	PAOK (Greece)	Transfer	Winter		mff.se
35	DF	(Cameroon)	Samuel Kotto	21	Gent (Belgium)	Transfer	Winter		mff.se
33	DF	(Sweden)	Elison Makolli	20	AaB (Denmark)	Transfer	Winter		mff.se
	DF	(Sweden)	André Alvarez Perez	19	Landskrona BoIS	Loan	Winter		mff.se
	MF	(Sweden)	Alexandru Ghita	19	BK Olympic	Loan	Winter		mff.se
	MF	(Sweden)	Anton Höög	17	BK Olympic	Loan	Winter		mff.se
14	MF	(Denmark)	Sebastian Jørgensen	24	IFK Norrköping	Loan	Winter		mff.se
3	DF	(Sweden)	Anton Tinnerholm	34	Retired	End of contract	Summer		mff.se
36	MF	(Kosovo)	Patriot Sejdiu	25	Östers IF	Loan	Summer		mff.se
14	MF	(Denmark)	Sebastian Jørgensen	25	AGF (Denmark)	Loan	Summer		mff.se
15	DF	(Sweden)	Joseph Ceesay	27	Empoli (Italy)	Transfer	Summer		mff.se
9	FW	(Sweden)	Isaac Kiese Thelin	33	Free agent	End of contract	Summer		mff.se
34	MF	(Sweden)	Zakaria Loukili	19	Varbergs BoIS	Loan	Summer		mff.se
1	GK	(Brazil)	Ricardo Friedrich	32	HJK (Finland)	Loan	Summer		mff.se
35	DF	(Sweden)	Nils Zätterström	20	Sheffield United (England)	Transfer	Summer		mff.se

EU = if holds or not a European Union passport; Country: when 2 flags, 1st flag = country that plays for internationally, 2nd flag = country of birth; N = number on jersey; P = Position (for position name, pause mouse pointer on abbreviation); Name = Name on jersey (for more extensive name, pause mouse pointer on name); Age = age on the day of the signing; Moving from = only indicate the club the player was playing before start playing for this club in this season, for the type of the moving see Status column; Moving to = only indicates the club the player is going to play next, for the type of the moving see Status column; Ends = when the player's current contract ends; n/a = Not applicable.

== Player statistics ==
=== Appearances and goals ===
As of 11 December 2025

Number	Position	Name	2025 Allsvenskan		2024–25 Svenska Cupen 2025–26 Svenska Cupen		2024–25 UEFA Europa League 2025–26 UEFA Champions League 2025–26 UEFA Europa League		Total	
Number	Position	Name	Appearances	Goals	Appearances	Goals	Appearances	Goals	Appearances	Goals
1	GK	Ricardo Friedrich	9	0	4	0	0	0	13	0
2	DF	Johan Karlsson	14	1	7	0	3	0	24	1
3	DF	Anton Tinnerholm	0	0	0	0	0	0	0	0
5	DF	Andrej Đurić	9	0	1	0	9	0	19	0
6	MF	Oscar Lewicki	8	0	1	0	6	1	15	1
7	MF	Otto Rosengren	26	2	6	1	12	1	44	4
8	FW	Arnór Sigurðsson	13	1	1	0	4	0	18	1
9	FW	Isaac Kiese Thelin	16	3	6	4	1	0	23	7
10	MF	Anders Christiansen	14	4	6	1	5	0	25	5
11	FW	Emmanuel Ekong	21	4	6	1	12	1	39	6
13	DF	Martin Olsson	6	1	1	0	0	0	7	1
14	MF	Sebastian Jørgensen	0	0	1	0	0	0	1	0
15	DF	Joseph Ceesay	0	0	0	0	0	0	0	0
15	MF	Salifou Soumah	7	0	1	0	3	0	11	0
16	MF	Oliver Berg	17	0	3	1	10	0	30	1
17	DF	Jens Stryger Larsen	28	2	2	0	14	0	44	2
18	DF	Pontus Jansson	17	2	4	1	14	2	35	5
19	DF	Colin Rösler	24	1	7	0	13	0	44	1
20	FW	Erik Botheim	8	0	5	3	1	0	14	3
21	MF	Stefano Vecchia	7	0	1	0	3	0	11	0
22	MF	Taha Ali	26	2	5	1	10	3	41	6
23	MF	Lasse Berg Johnsen	22	3	6	1	12	3	40	7
25	DF	Gabriel Busanello	29	0	7	1	14	1	50	2
27	GK	Johan Dahlin	0	0	0	0	0	0	0	0
29	MF	Sead Hakšabanović	25	4	6	0	13	4	44	8
30	GK	Robin Olsen	14	0	0	0	9	0	23	0
30	GK	Joakim Persson	0	0	0	0	0	0	0	0
32	FW	Daníel Guðjohnsen	23	5	3	0	9	1	35	6
33	GK	Melker Ellborg	7	0	3	0	5	0	15	0
34	MF	Zakaria Loukili	3	0	2	0	0	0	5	0
35	DF	Nils Zätterström	10	0	3	0	2	0	15	0
37	MF	Adrian Skogmar	21	1	2	0	11	0	34	1
38	MF	Hugo Bolin	28	6	7	0	12	1	47	7
41	MF	Kenan Busuladžić	15	2	3	0	9	0	27	2
45	MF	Anton Höög	0	0	1	0	0	0	1	0
48	MF	Theodor Lundbergh	1	0	0	0	1	0	2	0

== Competitions ==
=== Allsvenskan ===
==== League table ====
Pos	Team	Pld	W	D	L	GF	GA	GD	Pts	Qualification or relegation
4	IFK Göteborg	30	16	3	11	41	33	+8	51	Qualification for the Conference League second qualifying round
5	Djurgårdens IF	30	13	10	7	52	32	+20	49	
6	Malmö FF	30	13	10	7	46	33	+13	49	
7	AIK	30	13	9	8	40	33	+7	48	
8	IF Elfsborg	30	12	4	14	45	51	−6	40	

Source: svenskfotboll.se (in Swedish)
Rules for classification: 1) Points; 2) Goal difference; 3) Goals scored; 4) Head-to-head points; 5) Head-to-head goal difference; 6) Head-to-head away goals scored; 7) Play-off
(Note: Play-off is only played if need to decide champion, teams for relegation or UEFA competition and will be played on a neutral ground).

==== Results summary ====
Overall								Home						Away					
Pld	W	D	L	GF	GA	GD	Pts	W	D	L	GF	GA	GD	W	D	L	GF	GA	GD
30	13	10	7	46	33	+13	49	7	4	4	23	16	+7	6	6	3	23	17	+6

Last updated: 10 November 2025.
Source: (in Swedish)

==== Results by round ====
Round	1	2	3	4	5	6	7	8	9	10	11	12	13	14	15	16	17	18	19	20	21	22	23	24	25	26	27	28	29	30
Ground	A	H	A	H	A	H	H	A	H	H	A	H	A	A	H	A	A	H	H	A	H	H	A	H	H	A	A	H	H	H
Result	W	W	D	D	L	W	L	W	D	W	L	W	D	D	W	W	W	D	L	W	D	D	D	L	W	L	W	L	D	W
Position	7	4	3	4	7	4	5	5	5	5	5	5	5	5	5	4	3	4	5	3	3	4	5	6	5	7	4	6	7	6

Source: see below
A = Away; H = Home; W = Win; D = Draw; L = Loss

==== Matches ====
29 March 2025 Matchday 1	Djurgårdens IF	0–1	Malmö FF	Stockholm
15:00		Report	Stryger Larsen 45+8'	Stadium: 3Arena; Attendance: 28,785; Referee: Glenn Nyberg

7 April 2025 Matchday 2	Malmö FF	2–1	IF Elfsborg	Malmö
19:10	Christiansen 47'; Sigurðsson 78'	Report	Hedlund 71'	Stadium: Stadion; Attendance: 20,930; Referee: Adam Ladebäck

14 April 2025 Matchday 3	AIK	0–0	Malmö FF	Stockholm
19:10		Report		Stadium: Strawberry Arena; Attendance: 28,472; Referee: Joakim Östling

18 April 2025 Matchday 4	Malmö FF	1–1	IK Sirius	Malmö
15:00	Berg Johnsen 85' (pen.)	Report	Mamatsashvili 10'	Stadium: Stadion; Attendance: 19,353; Referee: Victor Wolf

23 April 2025 Matchday 5	Hammarby IF	2–0	Malmö FF	Stockholm
19:00	Tounekti 74'; Karlsson 85'	Report		Stadium: 3Arena; Attendance: 27,884; Referee: Mohammed Al-Hakim

29 April 2025 Matchday 6	Malmö FF	2–0	Östers IF	Malmö
19:00	Bolin 32'; Kiese Thelin 46'	Report		Stadium: Stadion; Attendance: 19,764; Referee: Krisoffer Karlsson

5 May 2025 Matchday 7	Malmö FF	1–2	IF Brommapojkarna	Malmö
19:00	Berg Johnsen 83'	Report	Alladoh 49'; Irandust 52'	Stadium: Stadion; Attendance: 18,597; Referee: Oscar Johnson

11 May 2025 Matchday 8	Degerfors IF	1–4	Malmö FF	Degerfors
19:10	Rafferty 53'	Report	Berg Johnsen 7'; Ekong 28'; Bolin 49'; Christiansen 90+1'	Stadium: Stora Valla; Attendance: 5,608; Referee: Joakim Östling

15 May 2025 Matchday 9	IFK Värnamo	2–2	Malmö FF	Värnamo
19:00	Alsalkhadi 34'; Agyei 79'	Report	Guðjohnsen 4'; Jansson 39'	Stadium: Finnvedsvallen; Attendance: 3,481; Referee: Granit Maqedonci

18 May 2025 Matchday 10	Malmö FF	3–0	Halmstads BK	Malmö
16:30	Christiansen 31'; 45' (o.g.); Kiese Thelin 63'	Report		Stadium: Stadion; Attendance: 17,418; Referee: Richard Sundell

22 May 2025 Matchday 18	Malmö FF	0–0	AIK	Malmö
19:00		Report		Stadium: Stadion; Attendance: 21,269; Referee: Mohammed Al-Hakim

25 May 2025 Matchday 11	IFK Göteborg	1–0	Malmö FF	Gothenburg
14:00	Þórðarson 58'	Report		Stadium: Gamla Ullevi; Attendance: 16,284; Referee: Victor Wolf

1 June 2025 Matchday 12	Malmö FF	3–0	BK Häcken	Malmö
14:00	Karlsson 9'; Busuladžić 33'; Kiese Thelin 85'	Report		Stadium: Stadion; Attendance: 17,341; Referee: Adam Ladebäck

30 June 2025 Matchday 13	Mjällby AIF	1–1	Malmö FF	Hällevik
19:00	Stroud 73'	Report	Ali 9'	Stadium: Strandvallen; Attendance: 5,969; Referee: Joakim Östling

5 July 2025 Matchday 14	GAIS	0–0	Malmö FF	Gothenburg
15:00		Report		Stadium: Gamla Ullevi; Attendance: 11,313; Referee: Victor Wolf

12 July 2025 Matchday 15	Malmö FF	3–1	IFK Norrköping	Malmö
17:30	Hakšabanović 32'; Bolin 49'; Ekong 81'	Report	Nyman 87'	Stadium: Stadion; Attendance: 18,527; Referee: Kristoffer Karlsson

19 July 2025 Matchday 16	Östers IF	0–2	Malmö FF	Växjö
15:00		Report	Rosengren 24'; Hakšabanović 67'	Stadium: Spiris Arena; Attendance: 10,405; Referee: Erik Mattsson

26 July 2025 Matchday 17	IF Brommapojkarna	2–3	Malmö FF	Stockholm
15:00	Lind 23', 55'	Report	Bolin 15'; Rosengren 66'; 72' (o.g.)	Stadium: 3Arena; Attendance: 2,963; Referee: Adam Ladebäck

9 August 2025 Matchday 19	Malmö FF	1–3	Mjällby AIF	Malmö
15:00	Busuladžić 70'	Report	Johansson 50'; Stroud 58'; Gustafson 90+3'	Stadium: Stadion; Attendance: 20,212; Referee: Kristoffer Karlsson

16 August 2025 Matchday 20	Halmstads BK	0–4	Malmö FF	Halmstad
15:00		Report	Guðjohnsen 15'; Rösler 35'; Ali 44'; Hakšabanović 53'	Stadium: Örjans Vall; Attendance: 8,518; Referee: Adi Aganovic

24 August 2025 Matchday 21	Malmö FF	0–0	IFK Göteborg	Malmö
16:30		Report		Stadium: Stadion; Attendance: 20,597; Referee: Granit Maqedonci

31 August 2025 Matchday 22	Malmö FF	1–1	Degerfors IF	Malmö
14:00	Skogmar 43'	Report	Rafferty 10'	Stadium: Stadion; Attendance: 17,112; Referee: Tess Olofsson

14 September 2025 Matchday 23	IF Elfsborg	2–2	Malmö FF	Borås
16:30	Zeneli 71'; Wikström 77'	Report	Guðjohnsen 8', 33'	Stadium: Borås Arena; Attendance: 10,175; Referee: Adam Ladebäck

20 September 2025 Matchday 24	Malmö FF	0–1	Djurgårdens IF	Malmö
15:00		Report	Priske 88'	Stadium: Stadion; Attendance: 18,676; Referee: Fredrik Klitte

28 September 2025 Matchday 25	Malmö FF	3–2	IFK Värnamo	Malmö
16:30	Ekong 44'; Jansson 48'; Christiansen 72'	Report	Zeljkovic 39', 59'	Stadium: Stadion; Attendance: 15,226; Referee: Joakim Sars

5 October 2025 Matchday 26	IK Sirius	5–1	Malmö FF	Uppsala
16:30	3' (o.g.); Bjerkebo 23'; Ure 65'; Walta 68', 78' (pen.)	Report	Stryger 38'	Stadium: Studenternas IP; Attendance: 6,799; Referee: Granit Maqedonci

19 October 2025 Matchday 27	IFK Norrköping	0–2	Malmö FF	Norrköping
15:00	Tamba (yellow card) 54'; Sigurgeirsson (yellow card) 64'	Report	Ekong 34'; Bolin 82'	Stadium: Platinumcars Arena; Attendance: 10,019; Referee: Adam Ladebäck

27 October 2025 Matchday 28	Malmö FF	1–3	Hammarby IF	Malmö
19:10	Olsson 58'	Report	Besara 17'; Abraham 26'; 45+1' (o.g.)	Stadium: Stadion; Attendance: 19,144; Referee: Kristoffer Karlsso

1 November 2025 Matchday 29	BK Häcken	1–1	Malmö FF	Gothenburg
15:00	Gustafson 89'	Report	Bolin 29'	Stadium: Bravida Arena; Attendance: 4,314; Referee: Mohammed Al-Hakim

9 November 2025 Matchday 30	Malmö FF	2–1	GAIS	Malmö
15:00	Hakšabanović 52'; Guðjohnsen 63'	Report	Diabate 42' (pen.)	Stadium: Stadion; Attendance: 15,772; Referee: Joakim Sars

=== Svenska Cupen ===
Kickoff times are in UTC+1 unless stated otherwise.

==== 2024–25 ====
The tournament continued from the 2024 season.

===== Group stage =====
Pos	Team	Pld	W	D	L	GF	GA	GD	Pts	Qualification
1	Malmö FF	3	3	0	0	10	1	+9	9	Advance to Knockout stage
2	Västerås SK	3	2	0	1	7	4	+3	6	
3	Utsiktens BK	3	1	0	2	3	8	−5	3	
4	Skövde AIK	3	0	0	3	2	9	−7	0	

Source: SvFF
Rules for classification: 1) Points; 2) Goal difference; 3) Goals scored; 4) Head-to-head record; 5) Lowest disciplinary points; 6) Highest ranked team

16 February 2025 Matchday 1	Malmö FF	5–0	Utsiktens BK	Malmö
13:00	Botheim 11', 43'; Ali 13'; Christiansen 13'; Kiese Thelin 82'	Report		Stadium: Stadion; Attendance: 6,223; Referee: Kristoffer Karlsson

24 February 2025 Matchday 2	Skövde AIK	1–2	Malmö FF	Skövde
13:00	Skillermo 7'	Report	Busanello 8'; Rosengren 68'	Stadium: Södermalms IP; Attendance: 2,200; Referee: Fredrik Oppong

2 March 2025 Matchday 3	Malmö FF	3–0	Västerås SK	Malmö
17:30	Jansson 56'; Botheim 62'; Berg Johnsen 73'	Report		Stadium: Stadion; Attendance: 9,052; Referee: Oscar Johnson

===== Knockout stage =====
10 March 2025 Quarter-final	Malmö FF	1–0 (a.e.t.)	IF Elfsborg	Malmö
18:30	Kiese Thelin 96'	Report		Stadium: Stadion; Attendance: 12,872; Referee: Mohammed Al-Hakim

16 March 2025 Semi-final	Malmö FF	3–2 (a.e.t.)	IFK Göteborg	Malmö
16:00	Kiese Thelin 31', 45+2'; Berg 112'	Report	Fenger 72'; Þórðarson 87'	Stadium: Stadion; Attendance: 20,742; Referee: Kristoffer Karlsson

29 May 2025 Final	Malmö FF	0–0 (a.e.t.) (2–4 p)	BK Häcken	Malmö
15:00		Report		Stadium: Stadion; Attendance: 20,189; Referee: Glenn Nyberg
	Penalties
	Hakšabanović (penalty missed); Berg (penalty scored); Busanello (penalty missed); Rosengren (penalty scored)		(penalty missed) Gustafson; (penalty scored) Leach Holm; (penalty scored) Lundkvist; (penalty scored) Berisha; (penalty scored) Andersen

==== 2025–26 ====
===== Qualification stage =====
17 September 2025 Round 2	BK Olympic	0–1	Malmö FF	Malmö
19:00		Report	Ekong 57'	Stadium: Stadion; Attendance: 3,612; Referee: Kaspar Sjöberg

=== UEFA Champions League ===
==== 2025–26 ====
Kickoff times are in UTC+2 unless stated otherwise.

==== Qualifying phase ====
===== First qualifying round =====
8 July 2025 First Leg	Iberia 1999 (Georgia (country))	1–3	Malmö FF	Tbilisi
18:00 (20:00 UTC+4)	Rušević 86'	Report	Busanello 8'; Bolin 58'; Ali 70'	Stadium: Mikheil Meskhi Stadium; Attendance: 7,449; Referee: Igor Stojchevski

15 July 2025 Second Leg	Malmö FF	3–1 (6–2 agg.)	(Georgia (country)) Iberia 1999	Malmö
19:00	Ali 55', 89'; Jansson 60'	Report	Dzagania 90+3'	Stadium: Stadion; Attendance: 13,819; Referee: Romain Lissorgue

===== Second qualifying round =====
22 July 2025 First Leg	RFS (Latvia)	1–4	Malmö FF	Riga
19:00 (20:00 UTC+3)	Darko Lemajić 40'	Report	Rosengren 13'; Jansson 35'; Hakšabanović 58'; Berg Johnsen 88' (pen.)	Stadium: LNK Sporta Parks; Referee: Miloš Milanović

30 July 2025 Second Leg	Malmö FF	1–0 (5–1 agg.)	(Latvia) RFS	Malmö
19:00	Hakšabanović 25'	Report		Stadium: Stadion; Attendance: 14,225; Referee: Joey Kooij

===== Third qualifying round =====
5 August 2025 First Leg	Malmö FF	0–0	(Denmark) Copenhagen	Malmö
19:00		Report		Stadium: Stadion; Attendance: 20,175; Referee: João Pinheiro

12 August 2025 Second Leg	Copenhagen (Denmark)	5–0 (5–0 agg.)	Malmö FF	Copenhagen
19:00	Huescas 31'; Robert 43', 69'; Elyounoussi 51'; Mattsson 67'	Report		Stadium: Parken Stadium; Attendance: 34,233; Referee: José María Sánchez Martínez

=== UEFA Europa League ===
==== 2024–25 ====
Kickoff times are in UTC+2 unless stated otherwise.

==== League phase ====
Pos	Team	Pld	W	D	L	GF	GA	GD	Pts
29	(Israel Football Association) Maccabi Tel Aviv	8	2	0	6	8	17	−9	6
30	(Football Association of the Czech Republic) Slavia Prague	8	1	2	5	7	11	−4	5
31	(Swedish Football Association) Malmö FF	8	1	2	5	10	17	−7	5
32	(Latvian Football Federation) RFS	8	1	2	5	6	13	−7	5
33	(Bulgarian Football Union) Ludogorets Razgrad	8	0	4	4	4	11	−7	4

Source: UEFA
Rules for classification: League phase tiebreakers

The tournament started in the 2024 season.

23 January 2025 Matchday 7	Malmö FF	2–3	(Netherlands) Twente	Malmö
18:45	Johnsen 32'; Christiansen 79'	Report	Steijn 28' (pen.); Van Wolfswinkel 61' (pen.); Lagerbielke 64'	Stadium: Stadion; Attendance: 16,432; Referee: Sascha Stegemann

30 January 2025 Matchday 8	Slavia Prague (Czech Republic)	2–2	Malmö FF	Prague
21:00	Chorý 46'; Schranz 76'	Report	Ali 69'; Bolin 71'	Stadium: Fortuna Arena; Attendance: 17,026; Referee: Allard Lindhout

==== 2025–26 ====
Kickoff times are in UTC+2 unless stated otherwise.

==== Qualifying phase ====
===== Play-off round =====
21 August 2025 First Leg	Malmö FF	3–0	(Czech Republic) Sigma Olomouc	Malmö
19:00	Hakšabanović 8', 43'; Johnsen 90+2' (pen.)	Report		Stadium: Stadion; Attendance: 12,355; Referee: Tobias Stieler

28 August 2025 Second Leg	Sigma Olomouc (Czech Republic)	0–2 (0–5 agg.)	Malmö FF	Olomouc
18:30		Report	Guðjohnsen 62'; Ekong 90+1'	Stadium: Andrův stadion Attendance: 9,508; Referee: Radu Petrescu

==== League phase ====
Pos	Team	Pld	W	D	L	GF	GA	GD	Pts
32	(Scottish Football Association) Rangers	8	1	1	6	5	14	−9	4
33	(French Football Federation) Nice	8	1	0	7	7	15	−8	3
34	(Royal Dutch Football Association) Utrecht	8	0	1	7	5	15	−10	1
35	(Swedish Football Association) Malmö FF	8	0	1	7	4	15	−11	1
36	(Israel Football Association) Maccabi Tel Aviv	8	0	1	7	2	22	−20	1

Source: UEFA
Rules for classification: League phase tiebreakers

24 September 2025 Matchday 1	Malmö FF	1–2	(Bulgaria) Ludogorets Razgrad	Malmö
21:00	Berg Johnsen 78'	Report	Stanić 8' (pen.); Bile 23'	Stadium: Stadion; Attendance: 11,478; Referee: Manfredas Lukjančukas (Lithuania)

2 October 2025 Matchday 2	Viktoria Plzeň (Czech Republic)	3–0	Malmö FF	Plzeň
18:45	Vydra 34'; Durosinmi 44'; Spáčil 53'	Report		Stadium: Doosan Arena; Attendance: 10,811; Referee: Enea Jorgji (Albania)

23 October 2025 Matchday 3	Malmö FF	1–1	(Croatia) Dinamo Zagreb	Malmö
21:00	Lewicki 45+1'	Report	Varela 90+6'	Stadium: Stadion; Attendance: 14,212; Referee: Willy Delajod (France)

6 November 2025 Matchday 4	Malmö FF	0–1	(Greece) Panathinaikos	Malmö
18:45		Report	Đuričić 85'	Stadium: Stadion; Attendance: 12,531; Referee: Nick Walsh (Scotland)

27 November 2025 Matchday 5	Nottingham Forest (England)	3–0	Malmö FF	Nottingham
21:00 (20:00 UTC+0)	Yates 27'; Kalimuendo 44'; Milenković 59'	Report		Stadium: City Ground; Attendance: 28,941; Referee: Harm Osmers (Germany)

11 December 2025 Matchday 6	Porto (Portugal)	2–1	Malmö FF	Porto
21:00 (20:00 UTC+0)	Aghehowa 30', 36'	Report	Moura 90+5' (o.g.)	Stadium: Estádio do Dragão; Attendance: 33,364; Referee: Rohit Saggi (Norway)

The tournament continue into the 2026 season.

== Non-competitive ==
=== Pre-season ===
Kickoff times are in UTC+1 unless stated otherwise.

10 January 2025	Sparta Prague	3–1	Malmö FF	Marbella
15:30	Uchenna 8'; Olatunji 59'; Suchomel 75'	Report	Bolin 36'	Stadium: Banús Football Center

16 January 2025	Malmö FF	1–0	Slovan Liberec	Marbella
15:30	Botheim 6'	Report		Stadium: Marbella Football Center
