= Kenan Busuladžić =

Swedish footballer

Personal information
- Date of birth: 6 February 2007 (age 19)
- Place of birth: Oskarshamn, Sweden
- Height: 1.81 m (5 ft 11 in)
- Position: Midfielder

Team information
- Current team: Malmö FF
- Number: 40

Youth career
- Oskarshamns AIK
- 2023–2024: Malmö FF

Senior career*
| Years | Team | Apps | (Gls) |
| 2022–2023 | Oskarshamns AIK | 7 | (0) |
| 2024– | Malmö FF | 33 | (4) |
| 2024 | → BK Olympic (loan) | 6 | (0) |

International career^{‡}
| 2022–2024 | Sweden U17 | 17 | (0) |
| 2024–2025 | Sweden U19 | 18 | (0) |
| 2026 | Sweden U21 | 1 | (0) |
- * Club domestic league appearances and goals as of 13 September 2026 ‡ National team caps and goals as of 17:58, 4 June 2026 (UTC)

Kenan Busuladžić (born 6 February 2007) is a professional footballer who plays as a midfielder for Allsvenskan club Malmö FF.

== Club career ==
Busuladžić made his senior debut for Oskarshamns AIK in Ettan as a 15-year-old. After seven appearances for Oskarshamn he was signed for Malmö FF's under-19 squad a year later. He made his first team debut for Malmö FF against IFK Värnamo on 15 April 2024. On 6 March 2025 he signed a first team contract with Malmö FF.

== International career ==
Busuladžić featured regularly for the Swedish U17 and U19 national teams.

On 7 September 2026, Busuladžić earned his first call-up for the Bosnia and Herzegovina national team.

== Career statistics ==
=== Club ===
As of match played 13 September 2026

Appearances and goals by club, season and competition
| Club | Season | League | | | Svenska Cupen | | Continental | | Total | |
| Club | Season | Division | Apps | Goals | Apps | Goals | Apps | Goals | Apps | Goals |
|---|---|---|---|---|---|---|---|---|---|---|
| Oskarshamns AIK | 2022 | Ettan Fotboll | 3 | 0 | — | | — | | 3 | 0 |
| Oskarshamns AIK | 2023 | Ettan Fotboll | 4 | 0 | 3 | 0 | — | | 7 | 0 |
| Oskarshamns AIK | Total | | 7 | 0 | 3 | 0 | — | | 10 | 0 |
| Malmö FF | 2024 | Allsvenskan | 1 | 0 | 0 | 0 | — | | 1 | 0 |
| Malmö FF | 2025 | Allsvenskan | 15 | 2 | 3 | 0 | 9 (Note: Four appearances in UEFA Champions League, five appearances in UEFA Europa League) | 0 | 27 | 2 |
| Malmö FF | 2026 | Allsvenskan | 17 | 2 | 5 | 0 | 2 (Note: Appearances in UEFA Europa League) | 0 | 24 | 2 |
| Malmö FF | Total | | 33 | 4 | 8 | 0 | 11 | 0 | 52 | 4 |
| BK Olympic (loan) | 2024 | Ettan Fotboll | 6 | 0 | — | | — | | 6 | 0 |
| Career total | | | 46 | 4 | 11 | 0 | 11 | 0 | 68 | 4 |

== Honours ==
Malmö FF

- Allsvenskan: 2024
