= Theodor Lundbergh =

Swedish footballer

Personal information
- Full name: Mats Theodor Zidan Mbaze Lundbergh
- Date of birth: 21 August 2008 (age 18)
- Place of birth: Sweden
- Position: Central midfielder

Team information
- Current team: Malmö FF
- Number: 47

Youth career
- 2013–2018: Lilla Torg FF
- 2019–2021: FC Bellevue
- 2022–2025: Malmö FF

Senior career*
Years	Team	Apps	(Gls)
2025–	Malmö FF	23	(0)

International career^{‡}
2025	Sweden U17	2	(0)
2026–	Sweden U19	6	(0)
- * Club domestic league appearances and goals as of 19 September 2026 ‡ National team caps and goals as of 30 September 2026

Mats Theodor Zidan Mbaze Lundbergh (born 21 August 2008) is a Swedish professional footballer who plays as a central midfielder for Allsvenskan club Malmö FF.

== Club career ==
Lundbergh joined the youth academy of Malmö FF at the start of 2022, having previously played for local Malmö clubs Lilla Torg FF and FC Bellevue. On 28 October 2025, Lundbergh was promoted from the U19's and signed a professional contract with Malmö FF until the end of 2028. On 9 November 2025, he made his professional debut against GAIS as a late substitute in the final game of the 2025 Allsvenskan season. On 11 December 2025, at 17 years old, he made his starting debut for Malmö FF in a UEFA Europa League group stage draw against FC Porto at Estádio do Dragão. However, he was substituted in the 55th minute with a cramp-induced injury. After the game, interim head coach Anes Mravac praised Lundbergh and stated that he would bring the club "a lot of success".

Lundbergh continued playing consistently in the beginning of 2026 under new Spanish head coach Miguel Ángel Ramírez, starting in the final two UEFA Europa League group stage games versus Red Star Belgrade, and KRC Genk, whom he played the full 90 minutes against. On 12 April 2026, he made his Allsvenskan starting debut in a 3–1 win against GAIS at Eleda Stadion, garnering praise for his performance in the game. Following the game, the editorial staff of TV4, broadcasters of 2026 Allsvenskan, placed Lundbergh in their Team of the Week. Pundit Irma Helin Zibanejad said that "[she] was almost shocked at how good he was. He was playing in the right position now and is very mature, for his age, in the way he plays.".

== International career ==
Lundbergh is a youth international for Sweden.

== Personal life ==
Lundbergh is of Democratic Republic of the Congo descent through his father Patrik Manzila, a former footballer who in 2001 made 4 Allsvenskan appearances for Hammarby IF. His favourite player growing up was French midfielder N'Golo Kanté.

== Career statistics ==
As of match played 19 September 2026

Appearances and goals by club, season and competition
Club	Season	League			National cup		Europe		Other		Total	
Club	Season	Division	Apps	Goals	Apps	Goals	Apps	Goals	Apps	Goals	Apps	Goals
Malmö FF	2025	Allsvenskan	1	0	0	0	1 (Note: Appearances in UEFA Europa League)	0	—		2	0
Malmö FF	2026	Allsvenskan	22	0	5	0	2	0	—		29	0
Career total			23	0	5	0	3	0	0	0	31	0
