= Anton Höög =

Swedish footballer (born 2007

Personal information
- Full name: Anton Sebastian Höög
- Date of birth: 19 March 2007 (age 19)
- Position: Midfielder

Team information
- Current team: Malmö FF
- Number: 45

Youth career
- –2021: Bjärreds IF
- 2021–2024: Malmö FF

Senior career*
Years	Team	Apps	(Gls)
2025–	Malmö FF	11	(1)
2025	→ BK Olympic (loan)	19	(3)

International career^{‡}
2024	Sweden U17	3	(1)
2024–2025	Sweden U18	6	(1)
2025	Sweden U19	4	(0)
- * Club domestic league appearances and goals as of 19 September 2026 ‡ National team caps and goals as of 12 July 2026

Anton Sebastian Höög (born 19 March 2007) is a Swedish professional footballer who plays as a midfielder for Allsvenskan club Malmö FF.

== Club career ==
Höög began his career at Bjärreds IF, before moving to the youth academy of Malmö FF in the summer of 2021. Ahead of the 2025 season he was promoted to the first team, and subsequently loaned out to affiliate club BK Olympic. In Ettan Södra he recorded 3 goals in 19 appearances as BK Olympic finished 8th.

He returned to Malmö FF and made his Allsvenskan debut under caretaker manager Guillermo Molins as a substitute in a 1–0 win vs. Degerfors IF on 4 July 2026. In the following Allsvenskan game, Höög came on as a half-time substitute against IFK Göteborg, after an injury to Oscar Sjöstrand. It only took him two minutes to score his first Malmö FF and Allsvenskan goal, netting the fourth in a 4–0 win at Eleda Stadion.

== International career ==
Höög is a Swedish youth international, having represented Sweden's under-17s, under-18s, and under-19s.

== Style of play ==
Malmö FF head coach Gaute Helstrup has said about Höög: "I think he has a nice calmness with the ball and plays maturely, (...) he also has a good basic physique that will get even better with time."

== Career statistics ==
As of match played 19 September 2026

Appearances and goals by club, season and competition
Club	Season	League			Cup		Europe		Other		Total	
Club	Season	Division	Apps	Goals	Apps	Goals	Apps	Goals	Apps	Goals	Apps	Goals
Malmö FF	2025	Allsvenskan	0	0	1	0	—		—		1	0
Malmö FF	2026	Allsvenskan	11	1	1	0	—		—		12	1
Malmö FF	Total		11	1	2	0	0	0	0	0	13	1
BK Olympic (loan)	2025	Ettan Södra	19	3	—		—		—		19	3
Career total			30	4	2	0	0	0	0	0	32	4
