= Anna Carolina Laudon =

Swedish graphic designer (born 1971)

Anna Carolina Laudon (born March 12, 1971) is a Swedish typographic designer and graphic designer. Educated in Fine Art at Gerlesborgsskolan in Stockholm, Laudon earned a master's degree in graphic design at HDK School of Design and Crafts at the University of Gothenburg in Sweden, where she made her first font. She is fascinated in social topics such as Feminism, Human Issues, Intersectionality and Global Communication.

== Life and career ==
Born in Stockholm, Sweden, Carolina Laudon studied Book history, Intellectual properties and digital information, and Practical Design Research. She followed a higher education teacher training at Linnaeus University. For seven years, Laudon taught typography and type design at Konstfack, The University of Arts, Crafts and Design in Stockholm.

Carolina Laudon received the Christer Hellmark Scholarship in 2001, awarded by Ordfront. In 2012, Carolina Laudon received Berling Award, Sweden’s most prestigious prize in typographic design, followed by the Cultural Award from the Sten A Olsson Foundation for Research and Culture in 2014. In 2022, she was granted a ten-year long-term scholarship by the Swedish Arts Grants Committee.

From 2018 to 2023, Carolina Laudon served as President and Chair of ATypI, a nonprofit global forum for type and typography. During her presidency, she played a key role in hosting and developing a series of online conferences for the global type community throughout the pandemic, including ATypI All Over 2020, ATypI Tech Talks 2021, ATypI All Over 2021, and ATypI Tech Talks 2022.

Carolina Laudon has also served as an expert contributor in several of Sveriges Radio P1’s historical interviews and programs about typography and type design. Between 2012 and 2014, she regularly appeared in the radio program TYPO – A Radio Program About Typography and Typefaces, where she contributed expert knowledge on letterforms, the history of typography, writing traditions, and contemporary type design. Through the program, she helped bring typography into public discussion as both a cultural history and an art form for a wider Swedish audience.

== Laudon Design AB ==
In 1997, Carolina Laudon founded her first company, which became Laudon Design AB in Gothenburg in 2013. The studio has operated as an independent design studio based in Gothenburg, Sweden. The Laudon Design studio offers custom type design and lettering art, font development, logotype, typography and any discussions related to typography and type design.

Laudon also has a long record of book design and book typography, custom lettering with monograms, and graphic design work.

Laudon Design has created some of Sweden’s most widely used corporate typefaces, including custom typefaces for Systembolaget, Länsförsäkringar, Rusta, Hemnet, Gamlestaden, Academic Work, Unga Klara, Fello, MTRX, Oatly, and White Arkitekter, as well as newspaper typefaces for Dagens Nyheter.
