= Mattias Andersson =

Mattias Andersson may refer to:

- Mattias Andersson (racing driver) (born 1973), Swedish race car driver
- Mattias Andersson (handballer) (born 1978), Swedish handball player, silver medalist at the 2012 Summer Olympics
- Mattias Andersson (footballer, born 1981), Swedish football striker
- Mattias Andersson (footballer, born 1998), Swedish football defender
