= Otto Rosengren =

Swedish footballer (born 2023)

- Rosengren with Sweden U21 in 2023

Personal information
- Full name: Otto Eric Rosengren
- Date of birth: 16 May 2003 (age 23)
- Place of birth: Kalmar, Sweden
- Height: 1.78 m (5 ft 10 in)
- Position: Midfielder

Team information
- Current team: Malmö FF
- Number: 7

Youth career
- –2018: Sölvesborgs GoIF
- 2019–2021: Mjällby AIF

Senior career*
Years	Team	Apps	(Gls)
2021–2023	Mjällby AIF	38	(0)
2023–	Malmö FF	84	(6)

International career^{‡}
2019	Sweden U17	3	(1)
2022–2024	Sweden U21	16	(3)
2024	Sweden	1	(0)
- * Club domestic league appearances and goals as of 19 September 2026 ‡ National team caps and goals as of 16:24, 16 October 2024 (UTC)

Otto Eric Rosengren (born 16 May 2003) is a Swedish professional footballer who plays as a midfielder for Allsvenskan club Malmö FF.

== Club career ==
Rosengren was promoted to Mjällby's first team midway through the 2021 season. He made his Allsvenskan debut on 29 November 2021, playing 62 minutes in a goalless league draw with Örebro SK.

On 21 June 2023, Rosengren joined fellow Allsvenskan side Malmö FF for a reported fee of 15 million Swedish kronor, signing a four-and-a-half-year contract with the club. Rosengren was then part of the squad that won the 2023 Allsvenskan title, participating in a dozen matches and scoring twice.

== International career ==
Rosengren made his full international debut for the Sweden national team on 12 January 2024 in a friendly game against Estonia which Sweden won 2–1.

== Personal life ==
Otto Rosengren's father is former Mjällby and Kalmar FF defender Patrik Rosengren.

== Career statistics ==
=== Club ===
As of match played 19 September 2026

Club	Season	Division	League		Cup		Continental		Total	
Club	Season	Division	Apps	Goals	Apps	Goals	Apps	Goals	Apps	Goals
Mjällby	2021	Allsvenskan	2	0	0	0	—		2	0
Mjällby	2022	Allsvenskan	26	0	4	1	—		30	1
Mjällby	2023	Allsvenskan	10	0	6	0	—		16	0
Mjällby	Total		38	0	10	1	0	0	48	1
Malmö FF	2023	Allsvenskan	12	2	0	0	—		12	2
Malmö FF	2024	Allsvenskan	26	1	6	1	6 (Note: Appearances in UEFA Europa League)	0	38	2
Malmö FF	2025	Allsvenskan	26	2	6	1	14 (Note: Six appearances and one goal in UEFA Champions League, four appearances in UEFA Europa League)	1	46	3
Malmö FF	2026	Allsvenskan	20	2	1	1	0	0	21	3
Malmö FF	Total		84	7	13	3	20	0	118	9
Career total			122	7	24	4	20	0	166	11

=== International ===
Appearances and goals by national team and year
National team	Year	Apps	Goals
Sweden	2024	1	0
Total		1	0

== Honours ==
Malmö FF

- Allsvenskan: 2023, 2024
- Svenska Cupen: 2023–24
