= Sead Hakšabanović =

Montenegrin footballer

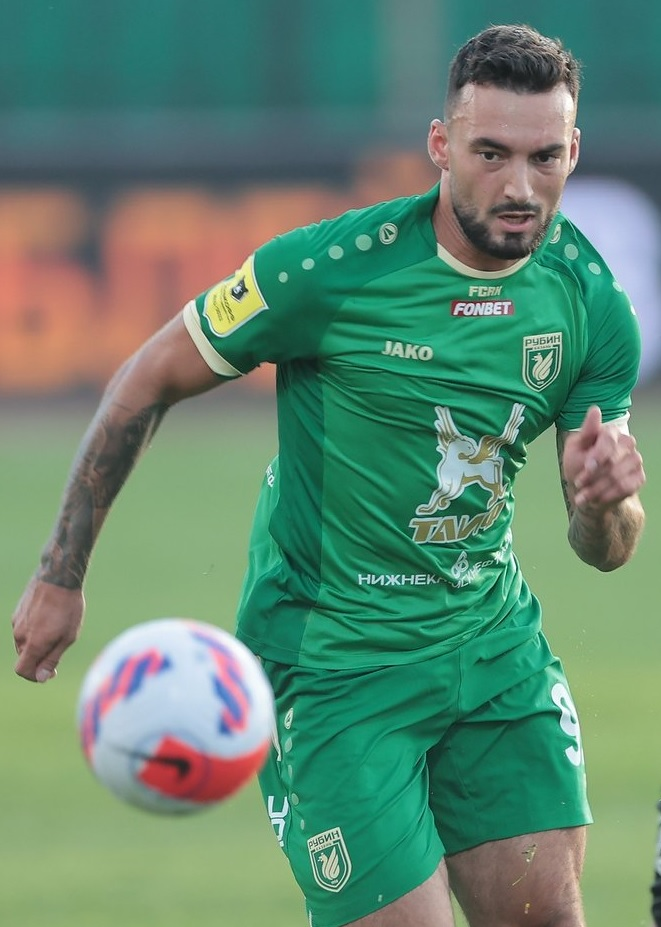
- Hakšabanović with Rubin Kazan in 2021

Personal information
- Full name: Sead Hakšabanović
- Date of birth: 4 May 1999 (age 27)
- Place of birth: Hyltebruk, Sweden
- Height: 1.74 m (5 ft 9 in)
- Position: Left winger

Team information
- Current team: Malmö FF
- Number: 29

Youth career
- 2006–2015: Halmstads BK

Senior career*
Years	Team	Apps	(Gls)
2015–2017	Halmstads BK	58	(12)
2017–2020	West Ham United	0	(0)
2018–2019	→ Málaga (loan)	2	(0)
2019–2020	→ IFK Norrköping (loan)	29	(6)
2020–2021	IFK Norrköping	36	(7)
2021–2022	Rubin Kazan	20	(1)
2022	→ Djurgårdens IF (loan)	11	(2)
2022–2024	Celtic	26	(5)
2023–2024	→ Stoke City (loan)	19	(1)
2024–	Malmö FF	50	(8)

International career^{‡}
2014–2016	Sweden U17	19	(2)
2016–2017	Sweden U19	5	(0)
2017–	Montenegro	38	(1)
- * Club domestic league appearances and goals as of 19 September 2026 ‡ National team caps and goals as of 15 November 2026

Sead Hakšabanović (Montenegrin: Сеад Хакшабановић; [seːad hakʃabaːnoʋitɕ]; Albanian: Sead Hakshabanaj; born 4 May 1999) is a professional footballer who plays as a left winger for Allsvenskan club Malmö FF. Born in Sweden, he represents the Montenegro national team.

== Club career ==
=== Halmstads BK ===
Hakšabanović represented Halmstads BK as a youth. He made his debut in Allsvenskan on 9 April 2015, coming on as a late substitute for Junes Barny in a 3–0 home loss against IFK Norrköping; at the age of only 15, he became the youngest-ever footballer to debut for Halmstad.

In August 2015 Hakšabanović spent a week on trial with Manchester United. He has also been on trials for Liverpool, Chelsea, Aston Villa and Manchester City.

After spending his first senior season with only ten appearances and no goals, Hakšabanović scored his first goal on 4 April 2016, netting his team's only in a 2–1 away loss against Sirius.

=== West Ham United ===
In August 2017, Hakšabanović signed a five-year contract with West Ham United in a £2.7 million transfer from Halmstad. He made his debut for West Ham on 19 September, playing 63 minutes in a 3–0 home victory against Bolton Wanderers in the EFL Cup.

==== Loan to Málaga ====
On 6 August 2018, Hakšabanović joined Segunda División side Málaga CF on loan for one season. On 17 November 2018, he made his debut in a 2–0 win against Gimnàstic de Tarragona. In December 2018, West Ham director Mario Husillos expressed dissatisfaction with Hakšabanović's playing time at Málaga.

=== IFK Norrköping ===
In January 2019, he joined IFK Norrköping on loan until the end of the 2019–20 season. On 2 November 2019, he scored a goal and made an assist in a 2–2 tie against 2019 Allsvenskan champions Djurgårdens IF.

In June 2020, Hakšabanović completed a transfer for an undisclosed fee to IFK Norrköping. During his time in IFK Norrköping he made 36 appearances, in which he produced 7 goals and 16 assists.

=== Rubin Kazan ===
On 27 May 2021, Hakšabanović moved to Russian club Rubin Kazan, in a transfer that IFK Norrköping described as their biggest sale ever. Rubin signed a 5-year contract with him and he was assigned shirt number 99.

Following the temporary suspension of his contract with Rubin Kazan, due to the Russian invasion of Ukraine, Hakšabanović joined Djurgården until 30 June 2022.

=== Celtic ===
On 25 August 2022, Hakšabanović joined Scottish Premiership side Celtic on a five-year deal. Six days later, he would make his debut for the club as a late substitute for Daizen Maeda in a 4–1 away win against Ross County in the Scottish League Cup.

On 6 September 2022, Hakšabanović made his UEFA Champions League debut against Real Madrid at Celtic Park where he came on as an 82nd-minute substitute for Jota in a 3–0 defeat. On 14 September 2022, he started the second group stage match of Celtic's 2022–23 Champions League campaign against Shakhtar Donetsk in the Stadion Wojska Polskiego, where Celtic drew with Shakhtar 1–1.

On 5 November 2022, Hakšabanović scored his first goal and brace for Celtic as they beat Dundee United 4–2 at home in the Scottish Premiership. His form would see him awarded with the Premiership Player of the Month for November.

==== Loan to Stoke City ====
On 1 September 2023, Hakšabanović joined EFL Championship side Stoke City on loan for the 2023–24 season. Hakšabanović made 21 appearances for Stoke, scoring once in a 3–2 win against Bristol City on 30 September 2023.

=== Malmö FF ===
On 26 June 2024, it was announced that Hakšabanović would join Allsvenskan club Malmö FF for an undisclosed fee, signing a four-year contract with the club.

== International career ==
Despite being born in Sweden and having played in Sweden's youth selection, Hakšabanović opted to play for Montenegro, where his family is from. He made his international senior debut for the Montenegrin national team in a 4–1 2018 FIFA World Cup qualification victory over Armenia, on 10 June 2017. Hakšabanović explained that he needed to go through an adjustment process when first joining the Montenegrin team, as he did not speak Montenegrin but only Albanian and English. On 19 November 2019, he scored his first international goal in a 2–0 friendly win over Belarus.

== Personal life ==
He was born in Sweden to ethnic Albanian parents from Tuzi and Mitrovica.

== Career statistics ==
=== Club ===
As of match played 19 September 2026

Appearances and goals by club, season and competition
Club	Season	League			National Cup		League Cup		Other		Total	
Club	Season	Division	Apps	Goals	Apps	Goals	Apps	Goals	Apps	Goals	Apps	Goals
Halmstads BK	2015	Allsvenskan	10	0	2	0	—		—		12	0
Halmstads BK	2016	Superettan	30	8	4	0	—		2 (Note: Appearances in the Superettan promotion play-offs)	0	36	8
Halmstads BK	2017	Allsvenskan	18	4	4	1	—		—		22	5
Halmstads BK	Total		58	12	10	1	—		2	0	70	13
West Ham United U23	2017–18	—							4 (Note: Appearance in the EFL Trophy)	0	4	0
West Ham United	2017–18	Premier League	0	0	1	0	1	0	—		2	0
Málaga (loan)	2018–19	Segunda División	2	0	0	0	—		0	0	2	0
IFK Norrköping	2019	Allsvenskan	29	6	3	0	—		5 (Note: Appearance in the UEFA Europa League)	2	37	8
IFK Norrköping	2020	Allsvenskan	29	7	2	1	—		—		31	8
IFK Norrköping	2021	Allsvenskan	7	0	4	5	—		—		11	5
IFK Norrköping	Total		65	13	9	6	0	0	5	2	79	21
Rubin Kazan	2021–22	Russian Premier League	20	1	1	0	—		2 (Note: Appearance in the UEFA Europa Conference League)	0	23	1
Djurgården (loan)	2022	Allsvenskan	11	2	0	0	—		—		11	2
Celtic	2022–23	Scottish Premiership	26	5	5	0	3	0	6 (Note: Appearances in UEFA Champions League)	0	40	5
Celtic	2023–24	Scottish Premiership	1	0	—		1	0	—		2	0
Celtic	Total		27	5	5	0	4	0	6	0	42	5
Stoke City (loan)	2023–24	EFL Championship	19	1	1	0	1	0	—		21	1
Malmö FF	2024	Allsvenskan	3	0	0	0	—		0	0	3	0
Malmö FF	2025	Allsvenskan	25	4	5	0	—		13 (Note: Six appearances and two goals in UEFA Champions League, seven appearances and two goals in UEFA Europa League)	4	43	8
Malmö FF	2026	Allsvenskan	22	4	4	0	—		2 (Note: Appearances in UEFA Europa League)	0	28	4
Malmö FF	Total		50	8	9	0	—		15	4	74	12
Career total			252	42	36	7	6	0	34	6	328	55

=== International ===
As of 15 November 2026

Appearances and goals by national team and year
National team	Year	Apps	Goals
Montenegro	2017	2	0
Montenegro	2018	2	0
Montenegro	2019	4	1
Montenegro	2020	6	0
Montenegro	2021	11	0
Montenegro	2022	5	0
Montenegro	2023	3	0
Montenegro	2026	5	0
Total		38	1

As of match played 19 November 2019. Montenegro score listed first, score column indicates score after each Haksabanovic goal.

International goals by date, venue, opponent, score, result and competition
No.	Date	Venue	Opponent	Score	Result	Competition	Ref.
1	19 November 2019	Podgorica City Stadium, Podgorica, Montenegro	Belarus	2–0	2–0	Friendly	

== Honours ==
Celtic

- Scottish Premiership: 2022–23
- Scottish Cup: 2022–23
- Scottish League Cup: 2022–23

Malmö FF

- Allsvenskan: 2024

Individual

- Allsvenskan top assist provider: 2020
