= Taha Ali =

Swedish footballer (born 1998)

- Ali with Sweden in 2026

Personal information
- Full name: Taha Abdi Ali
- Date of birth: 1 July 1998 (age 28)
- Place of birth: Stockholm, Sweden
- Height: 1.74 m (5 ft 9 in)
- Position: Winger

Team information
- Current team: PAOK
- Number: 22

Youth career
- 2006–2013: Spånga IS
- 2013–2016: Sundbybergs IK

Senior career*
Years	Team	Apps	(Gls)
2017	Sundbybergs IK	11	(3)
2018–2019	IFK Stocksund	36	(6)
2020	Sollentuna FK	29	(10)
2021	Örebro SK	2	(0)
2021	→ Västerås SK (loan)	15	(2)
2022	Helsingborgs IF	29	(3)
2023–2026	Malmö FF	90	(10)
2026–	PAOK	4	(1)

International career^{‡}
2024–	Sweden	4	(0)
- * Club domestic league appearances and goals as of 20 September 2026 ‡ National team caps and goals as of 16:00, 1 July 2026 (UTC)

Taha Abdi Ali (born 1 July 1998) is a Swedish professional footballer who plays as a left winger for Super League Greece club PAOK and the Sweden national team.

He has previously played for Sundbybergs IK, IFK Stocksund, Sollentuna FK, Örebro SK, Västerås SK, Helsingborgs IF and Malmö FF.

== Club career ==
Ali grew up in Tensta and started playing football at the age of eight in Spånga IS. At the end of 2013, he joined Sundbybergs IK at the age of 15. Ali scored three goals in 11 games for the club in Division 2 in 2017. He then played two years in IFK Stocksund. For the 2020 season, Ali was signed by Sollentuna FK. He scored 10 goals and as many assists in 29 games in the 2020 Ettan Norra, where Sollentuna finished in third place.

In February 2021, Ali was signed by Örebro SK, where he signed a three-year contract. Ali made his Allsvenskan debut on 24 May 2021 in a 2–1 loss to Malmö FF, where he was substituted in the 84th minute. After scant playing time (three competitive games in total), Ali was loaned out to Superettan club Västerås SK in August 2021 on a loan deal for the remainder of the season. The loan was a success for Ali, who scored two goals and eight assists in 15 games, helping Västerås stay in Superettan. He was also awarded the VLT prize as Västerås' best athlete in 2021, becoming the first footballer from Västerås SK to win the award.

In February 2022, Ali was signed by Helsingborg, where he signed a four-year contract. In January 2023, he joined fellow Swedish club Malmö FF, where he won his first league title in November later that year.

== International career ==
Ali made his senior debut for Sweden in a friendly match against Estonia on 12 January 2024, providing an assist for Isaac Kiese Thelin's game-winning goal in a 2–1 win. Ali played for 59 minutes before being replaced by Oscar Pettersson.

On 12 May 2026, Ali was named in the Sweden squad for the 2026 FIFA World Cup. Ali made his competitive debut for Sweden on 20 June 2026 in a 2026 FIFA World Cup group stage game against the Netherlands, replacing Yasin Ayari in the 79th minute of a 1–5 loss. Ali made his second appearance in the tournament in a round of 32 game against France, replacing Elliot Stroud in the 65th minute of a 0–3 loss.

== Futsal career ==
Ali played six international matches and scored one goal between 2018 and 2019 for the Swedish national futsal team. At club level, he played for Nacka Juniors FF and Hammarby Futsal in the Swedish Futsal League.

== Personal life ==
Ali was born in Stockholm, Sweden in 1998 to Somali parents. He worked as a security guard in the Stockholm Underground before turning into a professional footballer. His parents arrived in Sweden as refugees due to the Somali Civil War.

== Career statistics ==
=== Club ===
As of match played 3 May 2026

Appearances and goals by club, season and competition
Club	Season	League			Cup		Europe		Other		Total	
Club	Season	Division	Apps	Goals	Apps	Goals	Apps	Goals	Apps	Goals	Apps	Goals
Sundbybergs IK	2017	Ettan Fotboll	11	3	—		—		—		11	3
IFK Stocksund	2018	Ettan Fotboll	11	1	—		—		—		11	1
IFK Stocksund	2019	Ettan Fotboll	25	5	1	0	—		—		26	5
IFK Stocksund	Total		36	6	—		—		—		36	6
Sollentuna FK	2020	Ettan Fotboll	29	10	4	1	—		—		33	11
Örebro SK	2021	Allsvenskan	2	0	1	0	—		—		3	0
Västerås SK (loan)	2021	Superettan	15	2	—		—		—		15	2
Helsingborgs IF	2022	Allsvenskan	29	3	—		—		—		29	3
Malmö FF	2023	Allsvenskan	30	6	3	1	—		—		33	7
Malmö FF	2024	Allsvenskan	28	1	5	3	11 (Note: Six appearances in UEFA Champions League, five appearances in UEFA Europa League)	0	—		44	4
Malmö FF	2025	Allsvenskan	26	2	5	1	12 (Note: Six appearances and three goals in UEFA Champions League, six appearances and one goal in UEFA Europa League)	4	—		43	7
Malmö FF	2026	Allsvenskan	6	1	4	0	2 (Note: Appearances in UEFA Europa League)	1	—		12	12
Malmö FF	Total		90	10	17	5	25	5	—		132	20
Career total			212	34	23	6	25	5	0	0	260	45

=== International ===
As of 30 June 2026

Appearances and goals by national team and year
National team	Year	Apps	Goals
Sweden	2024	1	0
Sweden	2025	0	0
Sweden	2026	3	0
Total		4	0

== Honours ==
Malmö FF

- Allsvenskan: 2023, 2024
- Svenska Cupen: 2023–24
