= Johan Karlsson =

Johan Karlsson may refer to:

- Johan Karlsson (footballer, born 1975)
- Johan Karlsson (footballer, born 2001)
