= Zakaria Loukili =

Swedish footballer (born 2006)

Personal information
- Full name: Zakaria Loukili
- Date of birth: 25 January 2006 (age 20)
- Place of birth: Copenhagen, Denmark
- Height: 1.75 m (5 ft 9 in)
- Position: Midfielder

Team information
- Current team: Landskrona BoIS
- Number: 23

Youth career
- 2011–2023: Malmö FF

Senior career*
Years	Team	Apps	(Gls)
2024–	Malmö FF	9	(0)
2025	→ Varbergs BoIS (loan)	10	(1)
2026–	→ Landskrona BoIS (loan)	28	(2)

International career^{‡}
2022–2023	Sweden U17	9	(1)
2023–2024	Sweden U19	18	(3)
2025–	Sweden U21	2	(0)
- * Club domestic league appearances and goals as of 11 November 2026 ‡ National team caps and goals as of 22:57, 27 March 2025 (UTC)

Zakaria Loukili (born 25 January 2006) is a Swedish professional footballer who plays as a midfielder for Landskrona BoIS, on loan from Malmö FF.

== Career ==
On 31 October 2024, Loukili signed for the senior team of Malmö FF. Prior to this, Loukili made several appearances in the academy and won P17 Allsvenskan with Malmö's U17 team in 2022. Loukili made his debut appearance for Malmö FF, substituting teammate Lasse Berg Johnsen in the 81st minute in a 5–0 win against AIK. His first start debut was in the 2024–25 UEFA Europa League league phase in a 0–1 loss against Greek side Olympiacos F.C.

== Personal life ==
Born to Moroccan parents in Copenhagen, Loukili moved to Malmö in his youth.

== Honours ==
Malmö FF

- Allsvenskan: 2024
