= Albin Lohikangas =

Swedish footballer (born 1998)

Personal information
- Full name: Albin Zackarias Lohikangas
- Date of birth: 20 August 1998 (age 28)
- Height: 1.80 m (5 ft 11 in)
- Position: Defender

Youth career
- –2013: Brynäs IF
- 2014–2017: Gefle IF

Senior career*
Years	Team	Apps	(Gls)
2016–2021	Gefle IF	116	(5)
2017	→ Egersunds IK (loan)	1	(0)
2022–2025	IFK Värnamo	50	(1)
- * Club domestic league appearances and goals as of 1 July 2025

Albin Lohikangas (born 20 August 1998) is a Swedish footballer who plays as a left back.

He started his youth career in Brynäs IF before joining the youth section of Gefle IF in 2014. He made his senior debut for Gefle in a cup game in February 2016, and also made two substitute appearances for the club in the 2016 Allsvenskan, the first in September 2016. In the same year he took part in a local campaign against domestic violence.

In 2017 Lohikangas was selected for Sweden U19's preliminary 25-man squad for the 2017 UEFA European Under-19 Championship. The squad would be reduced to 18 players in time for the tournament. He was also sent on loan to Norwegian club Egersunds IK, barely missing a goal chance in his debut match.

Following a lengthy spell in Gefle, mainly spent on the third tier after Gefle was relegated from the 2018 Superettan, Lohikangas was discovered and signed by Allsvenskan team IFK Värnamo in July 2022. He scored his first Allsvenskan goal in late May 2023.

After the 2024 Allsvenskan, Värnamo found themselves in a relegation playoff against Landskrona. In the second leg, Lohikangas became Värnamo's "unlikely hero" as he scored the only goal of the match, which secured Värnamo's retention in the highest league. Said Lohikangas, "I do one [goal] per year, so I saved it until now". It was his first goal in 545 days.
