= Länsförsäkringar Bank =

Swedish banking corporation

Länsförsäkringar Bank is a Swedish retail bank. As of 2022 it was the fifth largest retail bank in Sweden. The bank is owned by the customer owned insurance group of the same name, Länsförsäkringar.

== History ==
Länsförsäkringar Bank was started in 1996. In 1998 Länsförsäkringar merged with the Wasa insurance company, alongside this Länsförsäkringar Bank was merged with WASA Bank.

== Legal issues ==
In December 2022 Länsförsäkringar Bank was fined 90 million SEK by the Financial Supervisory Authority due to insufficient controls against money laundering.

== See also ==
- List of banks in Sweden
