= August Karlin =

Swedish footballer

Personal information
- Full name: August Jonathan Karlin
- Date of birth: 9 June 2003 (age 23)
- Place of birth: Malmö, Sweden
- Height: 1.78 m (5 ft 10 in)
- Position: Central midfielder

Team information
- Current team: BK Olympic
- Number: 8

Youth career
- –2014: Kyrkheddinge IF
- 2015–2021: Malmö FF

Senior career*
Years	Team	Apps	(Gls)
2022–2023	Malmö FF	0	(0)
2022	→ BK Olympic (loan)	27	(1)
2023	→ Jönköpings Södra (loan)	18	(2)
2024	Lillestrøm SK	8	(0)
2025–	BK Olympic	51	(1)

International career^{‡}
2018–2019	Sweden U17	7	(0)
2021–2022	Sweden U19	6	(0)
- * Club domestic league appearances and goals as of 16 November 2026 ‡ National team caps and goals as of 26 March 2022

August Jonathan Karlin (born 9 June 2003) is a Swedish professional footballer who plays as a central midfielder for Ettan Södra club BK Olympic.

== Club career ==
Karlin began his career with Kyrkheddinge IF before moving to Malmö FF at 11 years old. While progressing through the academy, he was re-trained into a central midfielder after previously playing as an attacker. On 22 December 2021, Karlin signed a professional contract with Malmö FF. He was subsequently loaned out to BK Olympic for the 2022 season. Before the 2023 season, Karlin was sent on another loan, this time to Superettan club Jönköpings Södra.

On 31 January 2024, Karlin left Malmö FF on a permanent deal to Eliteserien club Lillestrøm SK. There he was reunited with his previous youth coaches Andreas Georgson and Robin Asterhed, who had just been hired as head coach and assistant coach, respectively, by the Norwegian first tier club. Karlin played 8 league games during the season but following the club's degradation to the second tier, Karlin's contract was terminated by mutual consent.

After a year in Norway, Karlin returned to BK Olympic for the 2025 season.

== International career ==
Karlin is a youth international for Sweden.

== Personal life ==
Karlin's father is of Slovenian descent.
