= Johan Karlsson (footballer, born 2001) =

Swedish footballer

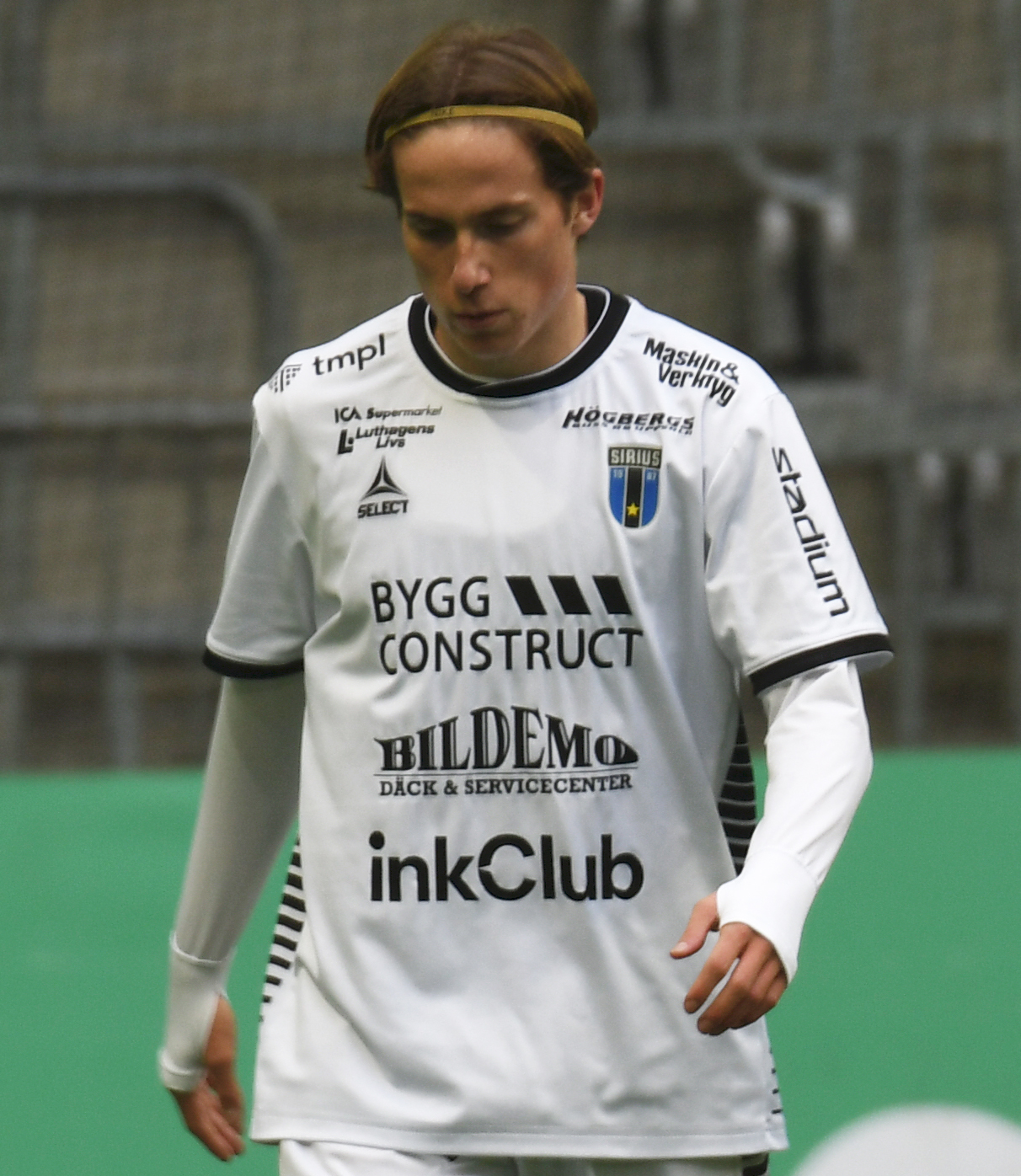

Personal information
- Full name: Olof Johan Andreas Karlsson
- Date of birth: 20 June 2001 (age 25)
- Height: 1.72 m (5 ft 8 in)
- Position: Defender

Team information
- Current team: Malmö FF
- Number: 2

Youth career
- –2020: IK Sirius

Senior career*
Years	Team	Apps	(Gls)
2020–2022	IK Sirius	54	(1)
2022–2024	Kalmar FF	56	(1)
2025–	Malmö FF	25	(1)

International career^{‡}
2021	Sweden U19	4	(0)
2024	Sweden	1	(0)
- * Club domestic league appearances and goals as of 9 August 2026 ‡ National team caps and goals as of 23:18, 12 January 2024 (UTC)

Olof Johan Andreas Karlsson (born 20 June 2001) is a Swedish professional footballer who plays as a defender for Malmö FF.

== International career ==
Karlsson made his full international debut for the Sweden national team on 12 January 2024 in a friendly game against Estonia which Sweden won 2–1.

== Career statistics ==
=== Club ===
As of match played 9 August 2026

Appearances and goals by club, season and competition
Club	Season	League			National Cup		Europe		Other		Total	
Club	Season	Division	Apps	Goals	Apps	Goals	Apps	Goals	Apps	Goals	Apps	Goals
IK Sirius	2020	Allsvenskan	19	0	1	0	—		—		20	0
IK Sirius	2021	Allsvenskan	22	1	4	0	—		—		26	1
IK Sirius	2022	Allsvenskan	13	0	0	0	—		—		13	0
IK Sirius	Total		53	1	5	0	—		—		58	1
Kalmar FF	2022	Allsvenskan	13	1	1	0	—		—		14	1
Kalmar FF	2023	Allsvenskan	26	0	5	2	2 (Note: Appearances in UEFA Conference League)	0	—		33	2
Kalmar FF	2024	Allsvenskan	17	0	1	0	—		—		18	0
Kalmar FF	Total		56	1	7	2	2	0	—		65	3
Malmö	2025	Allsvenskan	14	1	7	0	3 (Note: Two appearances in UEFA Champions League, one appearance in UEFA Europa League)	0	—		25	1
Malmö	2026	Allsvenskan	10	0	4	0	2 (Note: Appearances in UEFA Europa League)	0	—		16	0
Malmö	Total		25	1	11	0	5	0	—		41	1
Career total			133	3	23	2	7	0	0	0	163	5

=== International ===
Appearances and goals by national team and year
National team	Year	Apps	Goals
Sweden	2024	1	0
Total		1	0
