= Simon Johansson (footballer) =

Swedish footballer

Personal information
- Full name: Simon Peter Pascal Johansson
- Date of birth: 5 February 1993 (age 33)
- Place of birth: Sweden
- Height: 1.84 m (6 ft 0 in)
- Position: Midfielder

Youth career
- –2008: Gideonsbergs IF
- 2008–2011: Västerås SK

Senior career*
Years	Team	Apps	(Gls)
2012–2025	Västerås SK	341	(53)
Total		341	(53)
- * Club domestic league appearances and goals

Simon Johansson (born 5 February 1993) is a Swedish former professional footballer who played as a midfielder. He is a one-club man, spending his whole career at Västerås SK.

== Career ==
Johansson started his youth career in Gideonsbergs IF, joined Västerås SK in 2008 and played on their senior from 2012. Following seven seasons in Division 1, Johansson and Västerås climbed to Superettan. In 2023, the team won promotion to the 2024 Allsvenskan.

Västerås avoided relegation to Division 2 in 2014 by a single goal in the last round. Johansson was on trial with Falkenbergs FF in late 2014. In 2015 he was rumoured to join IK Frej, Örgryte IS or Raufoss IL in Norway on a free transfer. The rumours returned after Västerås' promotion in 2019, this time regarding a transfer to an Allsvenskan club. Nonetheless, Johansson stayed in Västerås and served as team captain. In late 2023, Johansson played his 300th league game for the club. The club proceeded to win promotion to Allsvenskan for the first time since 1997.

== See also ==
- List of one-club men in association football
