= Gabriel Busanello =

Brazilian footballer (born 1998)

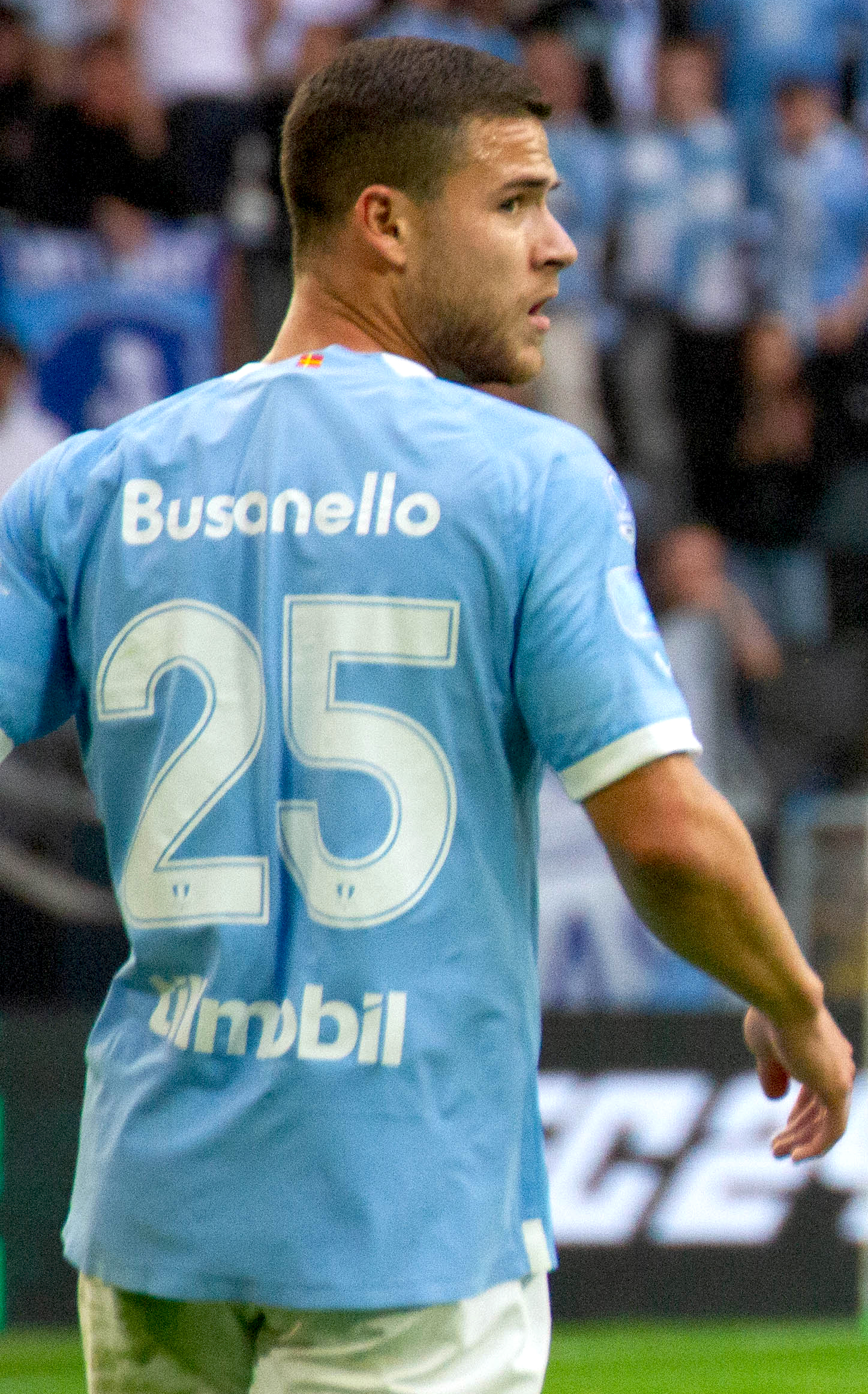
- Busanello with Malmö FF in 2023

Personal information
- Full name: Gabriel Dal Toé Busanello
- Date of birth: 29 October 1998 (age 28)
- Place of birth: Frederico Westphalen, Brazil
- Height: 1.79 m (5 ft 10 1/2 in)
- Position: Left back

Team information
- Current team: Malmö FF
- Number: 25

Youth career
- 2013–2016: União Frederiquense
- 2016–2018: Chapecoense

Senior career*
Years	Team	Apps	(Gls)
2015–2016	União Frederiquense	22	(0)
2017–2022	Chapecoense	66	(5)
2019	→ União Frederiquense (loan)	12	(1)
2019	→ Hercílio Luz (loan)	0	(0)
2019–2020	→ Pelotas (loan)	2	(0)
2022	→ Dnipro-1 (loan)	0	(0)
2022	→ Juventude (loan)	4	(0)
2022	→ Dnipro-1 (loan)	8	(0)
2023–	Malmö FF	98	(3)
- * Club domestic league appearances and goals as of 19 September 2026

Gabriel Dal Toé Busanello (born 29 October 1998) is a Brazilian footballer who plays as a left back for Allsvenskan club Malmö FF.

== Club career ==
=== Early career ===
Born in Frederico Westphalen, Rio Grande do Sul, Busanello was an União Frederiquense youth graduate. Promoted to the main squad in July 2015, he made his senior debut on 6 September of that year, starting in a 3–1 Copa Serrana home win against Gaúcho.

Busanello featured in six matches for the club in the Copa Serrana, as his side was crowned champions.

=== Chapecoense ===
In August 2016, after impressing during the 2016 Campeonato Gaúcho Série A2, Busanello agreed to a contract with Chapecoense. After being called up to the main squad for the 2017 season by new manager Vagner Mancini, he made his first team debut on 9 February 2017, starting in a 0–2 away loss against Cruzeiro in the Primeira Liga.

Busanello subsequently returned to the youth setup before rejoining União Frederiquense on 16 January 2019, on loan until the end of the Gaúcho Série A2. On 2 May, he moved to Hercílio Luz also in a temporary deal, but left in the following month to join Pelotas also on loan.

Busanello returned to Chape in May 2020, and was initially a backup to Alan Ruschel during the 2020 Série B. After Ruschel tested positive for COVID-19, Busanello started to appear regularly in the main squad, and renewed his contract until 2022 on 11 November.

== Career statistics ==
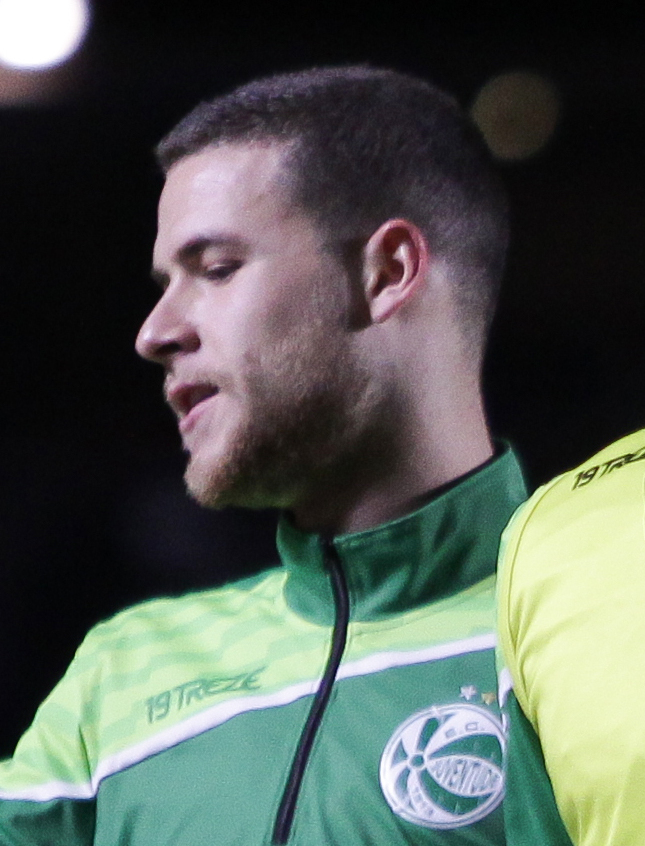
Busanello with Juventude in 2022

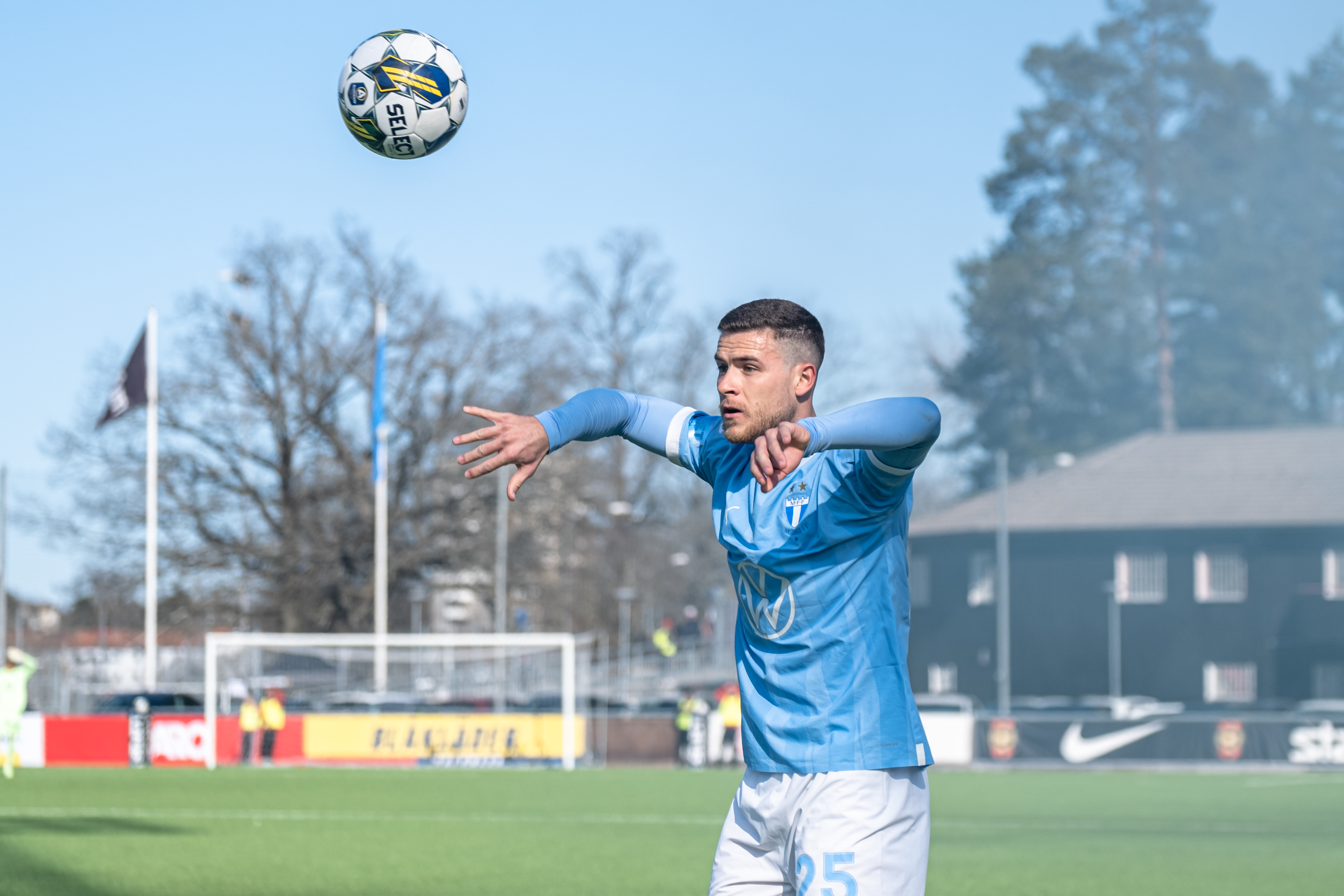
Busanello playing for Malmö FF in 2023

As of 19 September 2026

Club	Season	League			State League		Cup		Continental		Other		Total	
Club	Season	Division	Apps	Goals	Apps	Goals	Apps	Goals	Apps	Goals	Apps	Goals	Apps	Goals
União Frederiquense	2015	Gaúcho	—		0	0	—		—		6 (Note: Appearance(s) in Copa Serrana)	0	6	0
União Frederiquense	2016	Gaúcho A2	—		22	0	—		—		—		22	0
União Frederiquense	Total		—		22	0	—		—		6	0	28	0
Chapecoense	2017	Série A	0	0	0	0	0	0	—		1 (Note: Appearance(s) in Primeira Liga)	0	1	0
Chapecoense	2020	Série B	16	2	—		0	0	—		—		16	2
Chapecoense	2021	Série A	30	1	16	1	2	0	—		—		48	2
Chapecoense	2022	Série A	0	0	4	0	0	0	—		—		4	0
Chapecoense	Total		46	3	20	1	2	0	—		1	0	69	4
União Frederiquense (loan)	2019	Gaúcho A2	—		12	1	—		—		—		12	1
Hercílio Luz (loan)	2019	Série D	0	0	—		—		—		—		0	0
Pelotas (loan)	2019	Gaúcho	—		0	0	—		—		14 (Note: Appearance(s) in Copa FGF)	1	14	1
Pelotas (loan)	2020	Série D	0	0	2	0	—		—		0	0	2	0
Pelotas (loan)	Total		0	0	2	0	—		—		14	1	16	1
Juventude (loan)	2022	Série A	4	0	—		1	0	—		—		5	0
Dnipro-1 (loan)	2022–23	Ukrainian Premier League	8	0	—		—		7 (Note: Two appearances in UEFA Europa League, five appearances in UEFA Conference League)	0	—		15	0
Malmö	2023	Allsvenskan	26	1	—		4	0	—		—		30	1
Malmö	2024	Allsvenskan	26	1	—		5	0	12 (Note: Six appearances in UEFA Champions League, six appearances in UEFA Europa League)	0	—		43	1
Malmö	2025	Allsvenskan	29	0	—		7	1	16 (Note: Six appearances and one goal in UEFA Champions League, ten appearances in UEFA Europa League)	1	—		52	2
Malmö	2026	Allsvenskan	17	1	—		1	0	1 (Note: Appearances in UEFA Europa League)	0	—		19	1
Malmö	Total		98	3	—		17	1	29	1	—		144	5
Career total			156	6	56	2	20	1	36	1	21	1	289	11
