= Mattias Andersson (footballer, born 1998) =

Swedish footballer (born 1998)

Erik Mattias Andersson
Personal information
- Date of birth: 13 March 1998 (age 28)
- Place of birth: Malmö, Sweden
- Height: 1.88 m (6 ft 2 in)
- Position: Centre-back

Team information
- Current team: BK Olympic
- Number: 4

Youth career
- –2013: Limhamn Bunkeflo
- 2013–2016: Malmö FF
- 2016–2017: Juventus

Senior career*
Years	Team	Apps	(Gls)
2016	Malmö FF	0	(0)
2017–2019	Juventus	0	(0)
2017–2018	→ Den Bosch (loan)	8	(0)
2018–2019	→ Juventus U23 (res.)	23	(0)
2019–2022	Sion	3	(0)
2022	Randers	2	(0)
2023–2024	Trelleborgs FF	30	(2)
2025–	BK Olympic	22	(1)

International career
2015–2018	Sweden U19	17	(1)
- * Club domestic league appearances and goals as of 16 November 2026

Mattias Andersson (born 13 March 1998) is a Swedish footballer who plays as a centre-back for BK Olympic.

== Club career ==
In late August 2016 Malmö FF confirmed that they had sold Andersson to Juventus F.C. For the 2016 Supercoppa Italiana final versus A.C. Milan Andersson was included in the Juventus squad, however he did not make an appearance. In September 2017 it was announced that Andersson would leave Juventus on loan to FC Den Bosch. Andersson made his Eerste Divisie debut for FC Den Bosch on 22 September 2017 in a game against FC Eindhoven. In the summer of 2019, Andersson transferred to FC Sion in the Swiss Super League.

On 31 January 2022, Andersson signed a six-month contract with Danish Superliga club Randers. He left the club again at the end of the season.
