= Länsförsäkringar =

Swedish insurance company group

Länsförsäkringar, or literally County Insurance, is a Swedish group of customer owned insurance companies. The group consists of 23 independent companies, one in each of the counties of Sweden (pre 1998 division), that cooperate under a common brand name. Länsförsäkringar Bank is a bank that was started in the 1990s and is operated by the group.
