= BK Olympic =

Swedish football club

- Full name: Bollklubben Olympic
- Founded: 1920
- Ground: Lindängens IP; Lindängen; Malmö; Sweden
- Chairman: Göran Jönsson
- Head coach: Anes Mravac
- 2026: 8th of 16
Home colours	Away colours

BK Olympic is a Swedish football club located in Lindängen which is a residential area of Malmö.

== Background ==
The club was founded in 1920 as IF Olympia. The following year the club was expanded and it was decided to make an application for provisional membership of the Skånes Fotbollförbund (Skåne Football Association). The club changed its name to BK Olympia and it was decided that the club colours should be green and white.

The club was forced to make a further change in 1924 as there was already a club called Olympia in Stockholm. In order to be granted entry into the Swedish Football Association and Swedish Sports Confederation the club became known as Bollklubben Olympic.

Since their foundation BK Olympic has participated mainly in the middle and lower divisions of the Swedish football league system. Their best performing season so far was in 2024, when they finished fourth in Ettan, the third highest tier of Swedish football. They play their home matches at the Lindängens IP in Malmö. The pitch measures 110 metres by 67 metres.

BK Olympic are affiliated to the Skånes Fotbollförbund.

== Season to season ==
Season	Level	Division	Section	Position	Movements
1993	Tier 4	Division 3	Södra Götaland	8th	
1994	Tier 4	Division 3	Södra Götaland	6th	
1995	Tier 4	Division 3	Södra Götaland	9th	Relegation Playoffs
1996	Tier 4	Division 3	Södra Götaland	1st	Promoted
1997	Tier 3	Division 2	Södra Götaland	9th	
1998	Tier 3	Division 2	Södra Götaland	11th	Relegated
1999	Tier 4	Division 3	Södra Götaland	12th	Relegated
2000	Tier 5	Division 4	Skåne Södra	2nd	Promoted
2001	Tier 4	Division 3	Södra Götaland	5th	
2002	Tier 4	Division 3	Södra Götaland	11th	Relegated
2003	Tier 5	Division 4	Skåne Södra	8th	
2004	Tier 5	Division 4	Skåne Södra	2nd	Promotion Playoffs
2005	Tier 5	Division 4	Skåne Södra	10th	Relegation Playoffs
2006*	Tier 6	Division 4	Skåne Södra	4th	
2007	Tier 6	Division 4	Skåne Södra	3rd	
2008	Tier 6	Division 4	Skåne Västra	8th	
2009	Tier 6	Division 4	Skåne Västra	2nd	Promotion Playoffs – Promoted
2010	Tier 5	Division 3	Södra Götaland	1st	Promoted
2011	Tier 4	Division 2	Södra Götaland	4th	
2012	Tier 4	Division 2	Södra Götaland	11th	Relegated
2013	Tier 5	Division 3	Södra Götaland	4th	
2014	Tier 5	Division 3	Södra Götaland	6th	
2015	Tier 5	Division 3	Södra Götaland	1st	Promoted
2016	Tier 4	Division 2	Södra Götaland	14th	Relegated
2017	Tier 5	Division 3	Södra Götaland	2nd	Promotion Playoffs – Promoted
2018	Tier 4	Division 2	Västra Götaland	9th	
2019	Tier 4	Division 2	Västra Götaland	2nd	Promotion Playoffs
2020	Tier 4	Division 2	Västra Götaland	7th	
2021	Tier 4	Division 2	Södra Götaland	1st	Promoted
2022	Tier 3	Division 1	Södra	6th	
2023	Tier 3	Division 1	Södra	9th	
2024	Tier 3	Division 1	Södra	4th	
2025	Tier 3	Division 1	Södra	8th	
2026	Tier 3	Division 1	Södra	8th	

== Attendances ==
In recent seasons BK Olympic have had the following average attendances:

Season	Average attendance	Division / Section	Level
2010	72	Div 3 Södra Götaland	Tier 5
2011	108	Div 2 Södra Götaland	Tier 4
2012	132	Div 2 Södra Götaland	Tier 4
2013	121	Div 3 Södra Götaland	Tier 5
2014	63	Div 3 Södra Götaland	Tier 5
2015	92	Div 3 Södra Götaland	Tier 5
2016	134	Div 2 Södra Götaland	Tier 4
2017	153	Div 3 Södra Götaland	Tier 5
2018	240	Div 2 Södra Götaland	Tier 4
2019	?	Div 2 Södra Götaland	Tier 4

* Attendances are provided in the Publikliga sections of the Svenska Fotbollförbundet website.

* League restructuring in 2006 resulted in a new division being created at Tier 3 and subsequent divisions dropping a level.

== Players ==
=== Current squad ===
As of 1 September 2026

Note: Flags indicate national team as defined under FIFA eligibility rules; some limited exceptions apply. Players may hold more than one non-FIFA nationality.

No.	Pos.	Nation	Player
1	GK	SWE	Joakim Persson (on loan from Malmö FF)
2	DF	SWE	Jacob Stern
3	DF	SWE	Casper Nilsson
4	DF	SWE	Mattias Andersson
5	DF	SWE	Emil Persson
6	DF	NGR	Francis Dovi
7	MF	SWE	Alexander Robért
8	MF	SWE	August Karlin
9	FW	NGR	Blessing Ejimole
10	FW	PLE	Osama Khattab
11	MF	NGR	Yusuf Olatunji
13	DF	SWE	Totte Holmkvist
14	MF	SWE	Johan Martinsson
15	DF	SWE	Linus Okoli

No.	Pos.	Nation	Player
16	FW	GHA	Mamudo Moro
17	DF	SWE	Martins Egbe
18	MF	SWE	Omar Abdou
19	DF	NGR	Emmanuel Igwe
20	FW	SWE	Liam Björninger (on loan from Norrby IF)
21	FW	SWE	Tom Murmark
22	DF	SWE	Albin Sundgren
23	MF	NGR	Eric Ologe
24	MF	SWE	Henry Palvén
27	MF	KOS	Medjen Llumnica (on loan from Malmö FF)
29	MF	SWE	Matteo Pavlak
30	GK	SWE	Vidar Egly
99	GK	SWE	Noah Hallberg

=== Out on loan ===
Note: Flags indicate national team as defined under FIFA eligibility rules; some limited exceptions apply. Players may hold more than one non-FIFA nationality.

No.	Pos.	Nation	Player
–	DF	MKD	Oliver Saveski (to FBK Balkan until 30 November 2026)
–	DF	SWE	Denzell Kristiansen (to NK Croatia until 30 November 2026)
–	FW	MKD	Aleksandar Saveski (to FBK Balkan until 30 November 2026)

== Head coaches ==
- (Sweden) Ahmed Chahrour (2016–2017)
- (Sweden) Adem Özay (2018)
- (Sweden) Anders Grimberg (2018–2019)
- (Sweden) Mladen Blagojevic (2020)
- (Sweden) Anders Grimberg (2021)
- (Sweden) Mesut Meral (2022)
- (Sweden) William Strömberg (2023)
- (Sweden) Paul Olausson (2024)
- (Sweden) Anes Mravac (2025)
- (Sweden) Firat Sahan (2025) (interim)
- (Sweden) Fred Jähnke (2026–)
