= Anes Mravac =

Swedish footballer

Personal information
- Date of birth: 17 July 1989 (age 37)
- Place of birth: Banja Luka, Bosnia and Herzegovina
- Height: 1.83 m (6 ft 0 in)
- Positions: Centre back; left back

Team information
- Current team: Middlesbrough (assistant head coach)

Youth career
- 1995–2001: Olofströms IF
- 2001–2006: Malmö FF

Senior career*
Years	Team	Apps	(Gls)
2006–2010	Malmö FF	5	(0)
2008	→ IF Limhamn Bunkeflo (loan)	3	(0)
2009	→ IFK Malmö (loan)	5	(0)
2009	→ Lilla Torg FF (loan)	9	(0)
2010	→ IF Limhamn Bunkeflo (loan)	22	(2)
2011–2012	IF Limhamn Bunkeflo	20	(1)
2013–2014	Trelleborgs FF	41	(2)
2015	IFK Malmö	14	(2)
2016	IF Sylvia	2	(0)
2017	Knäppingsborg BK	10	(2)

International career
2004–2006	Sweden U17	12	(1)
2006–2008	Sweden U19	8	(0)

Managerial career
- 2015: IFK Malmö (caretaker)
- 2021: IF Sylvia
- 2022: IFK Norrköping (assistant)
- 2023: IFK Värnamo (assistant)
- 2024: IFK Värnamo
- 2025: BK Olympic
- 2025: Malmö FF (interim)
- 2025–: Middlesbrough (assistant)
- * Club domestic league appearances and goals

Anes Mravac (born 17 July 1989) is a Swedish-Bosnian professional football coach and former player who is currently assistant head coach of EFL Championship club Middlesbrough.

== Career ==
In September 2025, Mravac took over as interim head coach of Malmö FF.
