= 2024 Allsvenskan =

100th season of Allsvenskan

Allsvenskan
- Season: 2024
- Dates: 30 March 2024 – 10 November 2024
- Champions: Malmö FF; 27th Allsvenskan title 24th Swedish title
- Relegated: Kalmar FF; Västerås SK
- Champions League: Malmö FF
- Europa League: BK Häcken
- Conference League: Hammarby IF; AIK
- Matches: 240
- Goals: 680 (2.83 per match)
- Top goalscorer: Nikola Vasić (17 goals)
- Biggest home win: Malmö FF 5–0 AIK (28 April 2024); IF Elfsborg 6–1 AIK (15 May 2024)
- Biggest away win: IFK Norrköping 1–5 Malmö FF (30 March 2024); GAIS 0–4 IF Brommapojkarna (31 March 2024); IFK Värnamo 0–4 Malmö FF (15 April 2024)
- Highest scoring: AIK 6–2 IFK Norrköping (5 May 2024); BK Häcken 3–5 IF Elfsborg (14 July 2024)
- Longest winning run: 6 matches Malmö FF; Djurgårdens IF
- Longest unbeaten run: 14 matches Malmö FF
- Longest winless run: 10 matches IFK Göteborg; Halmstads BK
- Longest losing run: 6 matches Halmstads BK
- Highest attendance: 47,129; AIK 1–0 Hammarby IF (29 September 2024)
- Lowest attendance: 316; IFK Värnamo 1–1 IF Brommapojkarna (12 May 2024)
- Average attendance: 10,786

The 2024 Allsvenskan was the 100th season since its establishment in 1924 of Sweden's top-level football league, Allsvenskan. The season began on 30 March 2024 and ended on 10 November 2024 (not including play-off matches).

Malmö FF successfully defended their Swedish championship title with their fourth such title in five years by defeating rivals IFK Göteborg 2–1 at Stadion on 28 October 2024.

== Teams ==
The league consisted of sixteen teams; the top fourteen sides from the previous season, and two teams promoted from the 2023 Superettan. Malmö FF entered the season as defending champions.

The promoted teams were Västerås SK (promoted after a 27-year absence) and GAIS (promoted after an 11-year absence), replacing the Allsvenskan relegated teams of Degerfors IF (relegated after 3 years in the top flight) and Varbergs BoIS (relegated after 4 years in the top flight).

Location of teams in 2024 Allsvenskan

=== Stadiums and locations ===
Team	Location	Stadium	Turf	Stadium capacity
AIK	Solna	Strawberry Arena	Natural	50,000
BK Häcken	Gothenburg	Bravida Arena	Artificial	6,316
Djurgårdens IF	Stockholm	Tele2 Arena	Artificial	30,000
GAIS	Gothenburg	Gamla Ullevi	Natural	18,454
Halmstads BK	Halmstad	Örjans Vall	Natural	10,873
Hammarby IF	Stockholm	Tele2 Arena	Artificial	30,000
IF Brommapojkarna	Stockholm	Grimsta IP	Artificial	5,000
IF Elfsborg	Borås	Borås Arena	Artificial	16,200
IFK Göteborg	Gothenburg	Gamla Ullevi	Natural	18,454
IFK Norrköping	Norrköping	Nya Parken (Note: Known as Platinumcars Arena for sponsorship reasons.)	Artificial	16,000
IFK Värnamo	Värnamo	Finnvedsvallen	Natural	5,000
IK Sirius	Uppsala	Studenternas IP	Artificial	10,522
Kalmar FF	Kalmar	Guldfågeln Arena	Natural	12,182
Malmö FF	Malmö	Stadion (Note: Known as Eleda Stadion for sponsorship reasons.)	Natural	22,500
Mjällby AIF	Hällevik	Strandvallen	Natural	7,500
Västerås SK	Västerås	Hitachi Energy Arena	Artificial	7,044

=== Personnel and kits ===
All teams are obligated to have the logo of the league sponsor Unibet as well as the Allsvenskan logo on the right sleeve of their shirt.

Note: Flags indicate national team as has been defined under FIFA eligibility rules. Players and Managers may hold more than one non-FIFA nationality.

Team	Head coach	Captain	Kit manufacturer	Sponsors	
Team	Head coach	Captain	Kit manufacturer	Main	Other
AIK	(Faroe Islands) Mikkjal Thomassen	(Sweden) Alexander Milošević	(United States) Nike	Truecaller	List: Front: Craftor; Back: Svea Bank; Sleeves: Stadium Sverige; Shorts: Volkswagen; Socks: None
BK Häcken	(Netherlands) Joop Oosterveld	(Sweden) Simon Gustafson	(Germany) Puma	BRA Bygg	List: Front: Volkswagen, Sankt Jörgen Park, Nordic Wellness; Back: Gevab Group, Brion Gruppen, Prefabsystem Syd; Sleeves: Stadium Sverige; Shorts: Varis Förvaltning, Länsförsäkringar Göteborg och Bohus, Demo Group, K-Bygg; Socks: Maxxis Tyres
Djurgårdens IF	(Sweden) Roberth Björknesjö	(Sweden) Magnus Eriksson	(Germany) Adidas	Mobill Parkering	List: Front: Nordic Wellness; Back: Sundström Safety, TCL Technology; Sleeves: Stadium Sverige; Shorts: Volkswagen; Socks: None
GAIS	(Sweden) Fredrik Holmberg	(Sweden) August Wängberg	(Denmark) Select	ITS Indeship	List: Front: SKAB Gruppen, Good Advice Sverige; Back: Nordic Wellness, various; Sleeves: Stadium Sverige; Shorts: AVIX, Safe Scaff, Åke Ekstrand Byggnads, Good Advice Sverige, Folie & Papper, Bostjärnan, Länsförsäkringar Göteborg och Bohus; Socks: None
Halmstads BK	(Sweden) Johan Lindholm	(Sweden) Andreas Johansson	(Germany) Puma	Getinge	List: Front: Cityfastigheter, Getinge, Sportringen, ClickitUp; Back: EAB AB, Östras Stenugnsbageriet; Sleeves: HFAB; Shorts: Volkswagen MotorHalland, Jonab Anläggnings, Villalivet, Länsförsäkringar Halland; Socks: GN Transport
Hammarby IF	(Sweden) Kim Hellberg	(Sweden) Nahir Besara	(Sweden) Craft	Projob Workwear	List: Front: Nordic Wellness, Intersport, Sesol Jönköping; Back: Sefina Pantbank; Sleeves: Berges Schakt & Transport; Shorts: Volkswagen, J&S Markservice; Socks: Clinton Mätkonsult
IF Brommapojkarna	(Sweden) Andreas Engelmark (Sweden) Olof Mellberg	(Sweden) Ludvig Fritzson	(United States) Nike	Bredbandsval.se	List: Front: Nöjd AB, Nordic Wellness; Back: None; Sleeves: Stadium Sverige; Shorts: Norteam, Bauhaus, Stora Coop; Socks: None
IF Elfsborg	(Sweden) Oscar Hiljemark	(Sweden) Johan Larsson	(England) Umbro	Sparbanken Sjuhärad	List: Front: Volkswagen Toveks Bil, Effektiv, RO-Gruppen, Input interior, Borås; Back: Pulsen Group, Rudholm Group; Sleeves: Musiklagret, Autocirc; Shorts: Infrakraft, Ellos, Skrotfrag, C Land Logistics, EAB, Cernera Fastigheter; Socks: SGA Conveyor System
IFK Göteborg	(Sweden) Stefan Billborn	(Sweden) Oscar Wendt	(Sweden) Craft	Serneke	List: Front: Serneke, Fameco, Merinfo; Back: Nordic Wellness, Mobill; Sleeves: None; Shorts: MG Motor; Socks: None
IFK Norrköping	(Sweden) Andreas Alm	(Sweden) Christoffer Nyman	(Germany) Adidas	Holmen	List: Front: Volkswagen, Stadium Sverige, Söderbergs Bil; Back: Let's create Norrköping, Lantmännen Biorefineries, PlatinumCars; Sleeves: Lundberg Fastigheter; Shorts: Länsförsäkringar Östgöta, Månsson Rör, PreZero; Socks: Ocab
IFK Värnamo	(Spain) Ferran Sibila	(Sweden) Freddy Winsth	(Germany) Puma	Liljedahl Group	List: Front: Zinkteknik, Nominit, Torrbollen Home, Liljedahl Group, Troax, Bufab, Konstsmide, DS Smith, Sandahls, 3M Peltor, Nyfosa, EAB, Heco Skruv; Back: Värnamo Energi, Finnvedsbostäder, GA Industri, Ramo Group; Sleeves: Stadium Sverige; Shorts: Nivika, Ramo Group, Ravema; Socks: Four Office
IK Sirius	(Sweden) Christer Mattiasson	(Sweden) Henrik Castegren	(Denmark) Select	ByggConstruct	List: Front: Toyo Tires, Sfär, Högbergs Buss, ICA Supermarket Luthagens Livs, Maskin & Verktyg; Back: Årsta Tak, Nordic Wellness, inkClub; Sleeves: Unisport; Shorts: Upplands Bilforum, Länsförsäkringar Uppsala, Elak AB, Team G El & VVS AB, Vaksala Måleri, ServeYou AB; Socks: None
Kalmar FF	(Sweden) Stefan Larsson	(Finland) Simon Skrabb	(Denmark) Select	MultiBygg	List: Front: Telink, Sportway, Pontuz Löfgren, Elon Group, CA Fastigheter; Back: Redeye AB, NearYou; Sleeves: Unisport, Ove Petersson; Shorts: Cupra, Nybloms Papper, Bergkvarabuss, ICA Supermarket Borgholm; Socks: None
Malmö FF	(Sweden) Henrik Rydström	(Denmark) Anders Christiansen	(Germany) Puma	Volkswagen	List: Front: None; Back: Tillmobil; Sleeves: Boozt; Shorts: None; Socks: None
Mjällby AIF	(Sweden) Anders Torstensson	(Sweden) Jesper Gustavsson	(Germany) Puma	Mellby Gård	List: Front: Kundpartner, Maxi ICA Stormarknad, Sölvesborg, Sydställningar, Enkla Elbolaget; Back: Järletoft Bygger; Sleeves: Falkeskog; Shorts: Säljfast, Volkswagen, Sölvesborg hjärta för bygden, SVB Industri, Mercedes-Benz Råbergs Bil, Extra Mjällby; Socks: None
Västerås SK	(Sweden) Kalle Karlsson	(Sweden) Simon Johansson	(Germany) Puma	Hygienteknik	List: Front: Hitachi Energy, Telexia AB, Carpenter Fastigheter, Intersport Västerås Takentreprenad, Spolpatrullen; Back: ABB; Sleeves: Västerås; Shorts: Ryds Bilglas, Axelssons Turisttrafik, Länsförsäkringar Bergslagen; Socks: None

=== Managerial changes ===
Team	Outgoing manager	Manner of departure	Date of vacancy	Table	Incoming manager	Date of appointment
IFK Norrköping	(Denmark) Glen Riddersholm	Mutual consent	13 November 2023	Pre-season	(Sweden) Andreas Alm	29 December 2023
IFK Värnamo	(Sweden) Kim Hellberg	End of contract	17 November 2023	Pre-season	(Sweden) Anes Mravac	17 November 2023
BK Häcken	(Norway) Per-Mathias Høgmo	Signed by Urawa Red Diamonds	15 December 2023	Pre-season	(Norway) Pål Arne Johansen	27 December 2023
Hammarby IF	(Hungary) Ábel Lőrincz	End of interim spell	14 December 2023	Pre-season	(Sweden) Kim Hellberg	14 December 2023
IF Elfsborg	(Sweden) Jimmy Thelin	Signed by Aberdeen	3 June 2024	9th	(Sweden) Oscar Hiljemark	3 June 2024
AIK	(Norway) Henning Berg	Resigned	14 June 2024	8th	(Faroe Islands) Mikkjal Thomassen	16 July 2024
IFK Göteborg	(Denmark) Jens Berthel Askou	Signed by Sparta Prague	15 June 2024	13th	(Sweden) Stefan Billborn	25 June 2024
Kalmar FF	(Denmark) Henrik Jensen	Signed by Burnley	20 June 2024	15th	(Sweden) Stefan Larsson (interim)	20 June 2024
IFK Värnamo	(Sweden) Anes Mravac	Sacked	23 August 2024	14th	(Spain) Ferran Sibila	23 August 2024
Halmstads BK	(Sweden) Magnus Haglund	Sacked	27 August 2024	13th	(Sweden) Johan Lindholm (interim)	27 August 2024
BK Häcken	(Norway) Pål Arne Johansen	Sacked	23 September 2024	9th	(Netherlands) Joop Oosterveld (interim)	23 September 2024
Djurgårdens IF	(Sweden) Kim Bergstrand (Sweden) Thomas Lagerlöf	Sacked	21 October 2024	3rd	(Sweden) Roberth Björknesjö (interim)	22 October 2024

== League table ==
Pos	Team	Pld	W	D	L	GF	GA	GD	Pts	Qualification or relegation
1	Malmö FF (C)	30	19	8	3	67	25	+42	65	Qualification for the Champions League first qualifying round
2	Hammarby IF	30	16	6	8	48	25	+23	54	Qualification for the Conference League second qualifying round
3	AIK	30	17	3	10	46	41	+5	54	Qualification for the Conference League second qualifying round
4	Djurgårdens IF	30	16	5	9	45	35	+10	53	
5	Mjällby AIF	30	14	8	8	44	35	+9	50	
6	GAIS	30	14	6	10	36	34	+2	48	
7	IF Elfsborg	30	13	6	11	52	44	+8	45	
8	BK Häcken	30	12	6	12	54	51	+3	42	Qualification for the Europa League first qualifying round (Note: BK Häcken qualified for the Europa League first qualifying round as the 2024–25 Svenska Cupen winners.)
9	IK Sirius	30	12	5	13	47	46	+1	41	
10	IF Brommapojkarna	30	8	10	12	46	53	−7	34	
11	IFK Norrköping	30	9	7	14	36	57	−21	34	
12	Halmstads BK	30	10	3	17	32	50	−18	33	
13	IFK Göteborg	30	7	10	13	33	43	−10	31	
14	IFK Värnamo (O)	30	7	10	13	30	40	−10	31	Qualification for the Allsvenskan play-off
15	Kalmar FF (R)	30	8	6	16	38	58	−20	30	Relegation to Superettan
16	Västerås SK (R)	30	6	5	19	26	43	−17	23	Relegation to Superettan

Source: svenskfotboll.se (in Swedish)
Rules for classification: 1) Points; 2) Goal difference; 3) Goals scored; 4) Head-to-head points; 5) Head-to-head goal difference; 6) Head-to-head away goals scored; 7) Play-off
(Note: Play-off is only played if need to decide champion, teams for relegation or UEFA competition and will be played on a neutral ground).
(C) Champions; (O) Play-off winners; (R) Relegated

== Positions by round ==
Team ╲ Round	1	2	3	4	5	6	7	8	9	10	11	12	13	14	15	16	17	18	19	20	21	22	23	24	25	26	27	28	29	30
Malmö FF	1	1	1	1	1	1	1	1	1	1	1	1	1	1	1	1	1	1	1	1	1	1	1	1	1	1	1	1	1	1
Hammarby IF	5	8	4	7	11	8	11	7	9	6	4	3	5	6	5	3	3	3	3	3	3	3	3	3	4	2	2	2	2	2
AIK	6	7	7	2	2	3	2	6	7	8	7	8	10	8	8	11	10	9	8	7	5	7	5	4	3	4	3	3	3	3
Djurgårdens IF	3	5	2	4	7	4	3	2	2	2	2	2	2	2	2	2	2	2	2	2	2	2	2	2	2	3	4	4	4	4
Mjällby AIF	7	3	3	5	8	5	7	5	3	4	5	5	3	3	3	6	4	4	6	4	4	4	6	6	7	5	5	5	5	5
GAIS	16	10	12	10	4	9	5	4	5	3	3	4	6	7	6	4	5	6	4	6	7	6	4	5	6	8	8	7	6	6
IF Elfsborg	9	7	10	11	13	13	8	11	8	9	8	9	7	5	4	7	7	5	7	5	6	5	7	7	5	6	7	8	7	7
BK Häcken	10	11	9	6	3	6	4	3	4	5	6	6	4	4	7	5	6	7	5	8	8	9	9	9	9	9	6	6	8	8
IK Sirius	4	2	5	8	9	12	13	10	10	11	12	10	11	9	9	8	8	8	9	9	9	8	8	8	8	7	9	9	9	9
IF Brommapojkarna	2	4	8	3	6	10	10	9	13	10	10	11	12	10	11	9	9	10	10	10	10	10	10	10	10	10	10	10	10	10
IFK Norrköping	15	16	13	14	10	7	9	12	12	14	14	14	15	16	15	14	12	11	11	11	11	11	11	11	12	12	12	11	11	11
Halmstads BK	14	9	6	9	5	2	6	8	6	7	9	7	8	11	13	10	11	12	13	13	13	14	14	14	14	14	14	13	12	12
IFK Göteborg	13	15	11	12	12	11	12	14	14	12	13	13	13	13	12	13	13	13	12	12	12	12	13	13	11	11	11	12	13	13
IFK Värnamo	8	12	14	13	14	14	14	13	11	13	11	12	9	12	10	12	14	14	14	14	14	15	12	12	13	13	13	14	14	14
Kalmar FF	12	14	16	15	16	16	15	15	15	15	15	15	14	14	14	15	15	15	15	16	16	13	15	15	15	15	15	15	15	15
Västerås SK	11	13	15	16	15	15	16	16	16	16	16	16	16	15	16	16	16	16	16	15	15	16	16	16	16	16	16	16	16	16

Leader and 2025–26 UEFA Champions League second qualifying round
2025–26 UEFA Conference League second qualifying round
Allsvenskan play-off
Relegation to 2025 Superettan

Updated to match(es) played on 10 November 2024. Source: everysport.com

== Results by round ==
Team ╲ Round	1	2	3	4	5	6	7	8	9	10	11	12	13	14	15	16	17	18	19	20	21	22	23	24	25	26	27	28	29	30
AIK	W	D	D	W	W	L	W	L	L	L	W	L	L	W	L	L	W	W	W	W	W	D	W	W	W	L	W	W	L	W
BK Häcken	L	D	W	W	W	L	W	W	L	D	L	W	W	L	D	W	L	L	W	D	D	D	L	L	W	W	W	L	L	L
Djurgårdens IF	W	D	W	L	L	W	W	W	W	W	W	L	W	W	L	W	D	W	L	W	L	D	L	W	D	D	L	W	L	W
GAIS	L	W	L	W	W	L	W	W	L	W	W	L	D	L	W	W	L	L	W	D	D	W	W	D	L	L	D	D	W	W
Halmstads BK	L	W	W	L	W	W	L	L	W	L	L	W	L	L	L	W	L	L	L	L	L	L	D	D	D	L	W	W	W	L
Hammarby IF	W	L	W	L	L	W	L	W	L	W	W	W	D	L	W	W	W	D	W	D	W	D	D	W	L	W	W	W	D	L
IF Brommapojkarna	W	D	L	W	D	L	D	D	L	W	D	D	L	W	L	W	W	D	L	L	D	L	D	L	W	W	D	L	L	L
IF Elfsborg	D	W	L	L	L	W	W	L	W	L	W	L	W	W	W	L	L	W	D	W	D	W	D	D	W	L	L	L	W	D
IFK Göteborg	L	L	W	D	L	W	L	L	D	W	L	W	L	W	D	L	D	D	D	L	L	D	D	D	W	W	L	L	D	L
IFK Norrköping	L	L	W	D	W	W	L	L	D	L	L	L	L	L	W	W	W	W	L	L	D	D	L	D	D	L	D	W	W	L
IFK Värnamo	D	L	L	W	L	L	W	D	W	L	W	L	W	L	D	L	L	D	L	D	L	L	W	D	D	D	D	L	W	D
IK Sirius	W	W	L	L	D	L	L	W	D	D	L	W	L	W	L	W	W	W	D	L	W	W	W	L	L	W	L	L	D	L
Kalmar FF	L	L	L	W	L	L	W	L	D	W	L	L	W	L	W	L	L	L	L	D	D	W	L	D	L	D	L	W	D	W
Malmö FF	W	W	W	W	W	W	L	W	W	D	W	D	W	L	W	L	W	W	W	D	W	D	W	D	W	D	D	W	D	W
Mjällby AIF	W	W	D	L	L	W	D	W	W	L	L	W	W	W	L	L	W	L	D	W	W	D	D	D	L	W	W	D	D	W
Västerås SK	L	L	L	L	W	L	L	L	L	D	D	W	L	W	D	L	L	L	W	W	L	L	L	D	L	L	D	L	L	W

Updated to match(es) played on 10 November 2024. Source: Soccerstats.com (in English)
W = Win; D = Draw; L = Lose

== Results ==
Home \ Away	AIK	BKH	DIF	GAIS	HBK	HAM	BP	IFE	IFKG	IFKN	IFKV	IKS	KFF	MFF	MAIF	VSK
AIK		0–2	2–0	0–1	5–1	1–0	2–1	2–1	5–2	6–2	2–0	1–3	1–2	0–0	1–0	1–0
BK Häcken	4–1		1–2	1–2	0–1	2–1	4–3	3–5	3–3	1–2	1–1	2–0	3–1	2–2	0–1	4–0
Djurgårdens IF	0–2	3–3		1–0	2–0	0–3	2–1	2–0	1–1	3–1	1–0	2–0	1–1	0–1	1–1	2–1
GAIS	2–0	3–0	3–0		3–1	0–0	0–4	2–1	2–1	0–1	0–0	2–1	1–1	0–0	2–1	2–0
Halmstads BK	1–2	3–0	1–0	4–0		2–1	0–2	0–1	1–0	0–0	1–0	3–1	2–2	0–1	1–3	0–1
Hammarby IF	2–1	2–0	2–0	0–0	1–0		3–3	3–0	0–1	1–1	1–2	3–0	3–1	2–2	3–0	2–1
IF Brommapojkarna	2–2	1–3	0–5	2–0	4–1	0–2		3–3	0–3	2–1	0–1	1–1	1–2	2–2	0–0	2–1
IF Elfsborg	6–1	1–3	1–2	2–1	2–0	0–0	3–0		3–1	2–2	2–2	2–0	1–2	3–1	3–1	1–0
IFK Göteborg	1–2	0–1	1–4	2–0	1–1	0–1	3–4	1–0		1–1	0–0	1–1	1–1	0–3	1–0	1–1
IFK Norrköping	1–0	3–3	1–3	1–0	1–0	1–2	1–1	4–2	0–2		0–4	0–2	2–0	1–5	1–2	2–1
IFK Värnamo	0–1	2–2	1–1	1–2	1–3	0–3	1–1	0–0	2–0	1–2		2–4	0–2	0–4	1–2	2–0
IK Sirius	0–1	0–3	0–1	3–1	3–0	0–3	3–2	4–1	2–2	5–1	0–1		3–1	3–4	1–1	0–0
Kalmar FF	0–1	1–0	2–1	2–3	5–2	1–4	0–1	1–3	0–1	1–1	3–1	1–2		2–2	0–3	0–4
Malmö FF	5–0	4–0	4–0	1–0	5–1	2–0	2–1	2–1	2–1	2–1	1–1	0–1	5–0		2–0	1–0
Mjällby AIF	1–1	2–1	1–3	1–1	3–1	3–0	1–1	1–1	1–0	3–0	1–1	3–2	3–2	2–1		2–1
Västerås SK	1–2	1–2	0–2	2–3	0–1	1–0	1–1	0–1	1–1	2–1	0–2	1–2	2–1	1–1	2–1	

Source: Swedish Football Association (in Swedish)
Legend: Blue = home team win; Yellow = draw; Red = away team win.
For upcoming matches, an "a" indicates there is an article about the rivalry between the two participants.

== Allsvenskan play-off ==
The 14th-placed team of Allsvenskan will meet the third-placed team from 2024 Superettan in a two-legged tie on a home-and-away basis with the team from Allsvenskan finishing at home.

21 November 2024
15:00

Landskrona BoIS	2–2	IFK Värnamo
Dzabic 50'; Asare 69'	Report	Grozdanic 13'; Voelkerling Persson 86'

Landskrona IP, Landskrona
Attendance: 4,755
Referee: Kristoffer Karlsson
24 November 2024
15:00

IFK Värnamo	1–0	Landskrona BoIS
Lohikangas 37'	Report

Borås Arena, Borås
Attendance: 2,380
Referee: Glenn Nyberg

IFK Värnamo won 3–2 on aggregate.

== Season statistics ==
=== Top scorers ===
As of 10 November 2024

Rank	Player	Club	Goals
1	(Sweden) Nikola Vasić	IF Brommapojkarna	17
2	(Sweden) Isaac Kiese Thelin	Malmö FF	15
3	(Sweden) Deniz Hümmet	Djurgårdens IF	14
3	(Cyprus) Ioannis Pittas	AIK	14
5	(Norway) Erik Botheim	Malmö FF	12
5	(Montenegro) Dino Islamović	Kalmar FF	12
7	(Sweden) Christoffer Nyman	IFK Norrköping	11
7	(Denmark) Yousef Salech	IK Sirius	11

=== Top goalkeepers ===
As of 10 November 2024
(Minimum of 10 games played)

Rank	Goalkeeper	Club	GP	GA	SV%	CS
1	(Suriname) Warner Hahn	Hammarby IF	15	8	85	10
2	(Sweden) Mergim Krasniqi	GAIS	21	21	77	9
3	(Sweden) Johan Dahlin	Malmö FF	20	14	76	10
4	(Sweden) Oliver Dovin	Hammarby IF	13	15	74	4
4	(Norway) Jacob Karlstrøm	IFK Göteborg	12	17	74	3
6	(Sweden) Noel Törnqvist	Mjällby AIF	27	29	73	7
7	(Brazil) Ricardo Friedrich	Malmö FF	10	11	72	4
8	(Sweden) Jacob Widell Zetterström	Djurgårdens IF	17	16	71	7
8	(Sweden) Viktor Andersson	IFK Värnamo	15	19	71	5
8	(Sweden) Peter Abrahamsson	BK Häcken	12	20	71	2

=== Hat-tricks ===
Player	For	Against	Result	Date
(Sweden) Ahmed Qasem	IF Elfsborg	AIK	6–1	15 May 2024
(Norway) Erik Botheim	Malmö FF	Kalmar FF	5–0	24 May 2024

=== Discipline ===
==== Player ====
- Most yellow cards: 11
  - (Sweden) Axel Henriksson (GAIS)
- Most red cards: 1
  - (Ghana) Michael Baidoo (Elfsborg)
  - (Sweden) Eric Björkander (Brommapojkarna)
  - (Norway) Tokmac Nguen (Djurgården)
  - (Iceland) Kolbeinn Þórðarson (Göteborg)
  - (Norway) Anders Trondsen (Göteborg)
  - (Ghana) Terry Yegbe (Elfsborg)

==== Club ====
- Most yellow cards: 21
  - Halmstad
- Most red cards: 2
  - Elfsborg
  - Göteborg

== Awards ==
=== Allsvenskans Stora Pris ===
For the twelfth year running, the broadcaster of Allsvenskan, Max, hosted an award ceremony where they presented seven awards and two special awards to the players and staff of the 16 Allsvenskan clubs, the award ceremony was held on 20 November 2024. The nominations for the 2024 season were officially announced on 15 November 2017. Nominees are displayed below, the winners are marked in bold text. Hammarby IF received the most nominations with five nominations, while Malmö FF received five nominations, Djurgårdens and AIK received three nominations, IF Brommapojkarna received two nominations, IFK Göteborg, Mjällby AIF, Västerås SK and Gais each received one nomination.

Goalkeeper of the year

- **Warner Hahn** (Hammarby IF)
- Jacob Widell Zetterström (Djurgårdens IF)
- Johan Dahlin (Malmö FF)

Defender of the year

- **Pontus Jansson** (Malmö FF)
- Shaquille Pinas (Hammarby IF)
- Elliot Stroud (Mjällby AIF)

Midfielder of the year

- **Sebastian Nanasi** (Malmö FF)
- Anton Salétros (AIK)
- Nahir Besara (Hammarby IF)

Forward of the year

- **Nikola Vasić** (IF Brommapojkarna)
- Deniz Hümmet (Djurgårdens IF)
- Isaac Kiese Thelin (Malmö FF)

Newcomer of the year

- **Samuel Dahl** (Djurgårdens IF)
- Lamine Fanne (AIK)
- Marcus Linday (Västerås SK)

Manager of the year

- **Fredrik Holmberg** (GAIS)
- Mikkjal Thomassen (AIK)
- Kim Hellberg (Hammarby IF)

Most valuable player of the year

- **Sebastian Nanasi** (Malmö FF)
- Nahir Besara (Hammarby IF)
- Nikola Vasić (IF Brommapojkarna)

=== Player of the Month award ===
Month	Player of the Month	
Month	Player	Club
April	(Sweden) Sebastian Nanasi	Malmö FF
May	(Sweden) Axel Henriksson	GAIS
June	—N/a	
July	(Sweden) Gustav Lundgren	GAIS
August	(Sweden) Hugo Bolin	Malmö FF
September	(Sweden) Gustav Lundgren	GAIS
October	(Sweden) Nahir Besara	Hammarby IF

=== Coach of the Month award ===
Month	Coach of the Month	
Month	Player	Club
April	(Sweden) Henrik Rydström	Malmö FF
May	(Sweden) Fredrik Holmberg	GAIS
June	—N/a	
July	(Sweden) Oscar Hiljemark	IF Elfsborg
August	(Faroe Islands) Mikkjal Thomassen	AIK
September	(Faroe Islands) Mikkjal Thomassen	AIK
October	(Sweden) Kim Hellberg	Hammarby IF

== See also ==
Competitions

- 2024 Superettan
- 2023–24 Svenska Cupen
- 2024–25 Svenska Cupen

Team seasons

- 2024 Djurgårdens IF season
- 2024 IFK Göteborg season

== Attendances ==
AIK Fotboll drew the highest average home attendance in the 2024 edition of the Swedish top-flight football league.

#	Football club	Home games	Average attendance
1	AIK Fotboll	15	28,589
2	Hammarby IF	15	23,579
3	Malmö FF	15	20,273
4	Djurgårdens IF	15	19,340
5	IFK Göteborg	15	16,846
6	GAIS	15	9,011
7	IF Elfsborg	15	8,318
8	IFK Norrköping	15	8,073
9	IK Sirius	15	7,033
10	Halmstads BK	15	6,299
11	Västerås SK	15	6,253
12	Kalmar FF	15	6,017
13	BK Häcken	15	4,973
14	Mjällby AIF	15	3,711
15	IFK Värnamo	15	2,357
16	IF Brommapojkarna	15	1,907
