= 2020 Malmö FF season =

Malmö FF
2020 season
- Chairman: Anders Pålsson
- Head coach: Jon Dahl Tomasson
- Stadium: Eleda Stadion
- Allsvenskan: 1st
- 2019–20 Svenska Cupen: Runners-up
- 2019–20 UEFA Europa League: Round of 32
- 2020–21 Svenska Cupen: Round 2
- 2020–21 UEFA Europa League: Play-off round
- Top goalscorer: League: Isaac Kiese Thelin (14); All: Isaac Kiese Thelin (17)
Home colours	Away colours	Third colours

The 2020 season is Malmö FF's 109th in existence, their 85th season in Allsvenskan and their 20th consecutive season in the league. They are competing in Allsvenskan, the 2019–20 Svenska Cupen where they finished as runners-up, the 2020–21 Svenska Cupen, the 2019–20 UEFA Europa League where they were knocked out in the round of 32, and the 2020–21 UEFA Europa League where they were knocked out in the play-off round. The season began with the first leg of the round of 32 of the UEFA Europa League on 20 February, league play started on 15 June and is scheduled to conclude on 6 December.

The season has been heavily affected by the COVID-19 pandemic, delaying the start of Allsvenskan from April until June, and the knock-out stage of Svenska Cupen from March and April until June and July. Malmö FF managed to play the round of 32 of the 2019–20 UEFA Europa League against VfL Wolfsburg and the group stage of the 2019–20 Svenska Cupen before the pandemic broke out. Jon Dahl Tomasson replaced Uwe Rösler as the club's head coach after the latter's departure at the end of last season. Anders Christiansen was appointed new club captain after Markus Rosenberg's retirement.

== Players ==
=== Squad ===
Note: Flags indicate national team as defined under FIFA eligibility rules; some limited exceptions apply. Players may hold more than one non-FIFA nationality.

No.	Pos.	Nation	Player
1	GK	CZE	Dušan Melichárek
2	DF	SWE	Eric Larsson
3	DF	DEN	Jonas Knudsen
4	DF	SWE	Behrang Safari
5	MF	DEN	Søren Rieks
6	MF	SWE	Oscar Lewicki
7	FW	SWE	Isaac Kiese Thelin
8	MF	ISL	Arnór Ingvi Traustason
9	FW	SWE	Guillermo Molins
10	MF	DEN	Anders Christiansen
11	FW	SWE	Ola Toivonen
14	DF	SWE	Felix Beijmo
15	DF	SWE	Anel Ahmedhodžić
16	GK	SWE	Mathias Nilsson
17	DF	SWE	Rasmus Bengtsson
18	MF	USA	Romain Gall

No.	Pos.	Nation	Player
19	MF	SWE	Erdal Rakip
20	MF	NGA	Bonke Innocent
21	MF	COM	Fouad Bachirou
22	MF	SWE	Adi Nalić
23	FW	SWE	Marcus Antonsson
24	DF	DEN	Lasse Nielsen
27	GK	SWE	Johan Dahlin
30	GK	SWE	Marko Johansson
31	DF	SWE	Franz Brorsson
32	MF	NOR	Jo Inge Berget
33	MF	SWE	Amel Mujanić
34	MF	SWE	Pavle Vagić
35	MF	SWE	Samuel Adrian
37	FW	SWE	Tim Prica
39	FW	SWE	Amin Sarr
40	DF	SWE	Hugo Andersson

=== Players in/out ===
==== In ====
No.	Pos.	Nat.	Name	Age	Moving from	Type	Transfer window	Ends	Transfer fee	Source
7	FW	(Sweden)	Isaac Kiese Thelin	27	Anderlecht (Belgium)	Loan	Winter	2020	N/A	mff.se
11	FW	(Sweden)	Ola Toivonen	33	Melbourne Victory (Australia)	Transfer	Summer	2022	Free	mff.se
14	DF	(Sweden)	Felix Beijmo	22	Werder Bremen (Germany)	Transfer	Summer	2023	Undisclosed	mff.se

==== Out ====
No.	Pos.	Nat.	Name	Age	Moving to	Type	Transfer window	Transfer fee	Source
9	FW	(Sweden)	Markus Rosenberg	37	Retired	End of contract	Winter	–	mff.se
38	MF	(Albania)	Laorent Shabani	20	IK Sirius	End of contract	Winter	Free	mff.se
39	MF	(Sweden)	Felix Konstandeliasz	20	Lunds BK	End of contract	Winter	Free	mff.se
—	MF	(Sweden)	Jakob Tånnander	19	HJK Helsinki (Finland)	End of contract	Winter	Free	mff.se
30	GK	(Sweden)	Marko Johansson	21	Mjällby AIF	Loan	Winter	–	mff.se
36	MF	(Sweden)	Patriot Sejdiu	19	Dalkurd FF	Loan	Winter	–	mff.se
18	MF	(United States)	Romain Gall	25	Stabæk (Norway)	Loan	Summer	–	mff.se
—	FW	(Sweden)	Sebastian Nanasi	18	Varbergs BoIS	Loan	Summer	–	mff.se
34	MF	(Sweden)	Pavle Vagić	20	Jönköpings Södra	Loan	Summer	–	mff.se
37	FW	(Sweden)	Tim Prica	18	Aalborg (Denmark)	Transfer	Summer	Undisclosed	mff.se
40	DF	(Sweden)	Hugo Andersson	21	Hobro IK (Denmark)	Loan	Summer	–	mff.se
18	MF	(United States)	Romain Gall	25	Örebro SK	Loan	Summer	–	mff.se
21	MF	(Comoros)	Fouad Bachirou	30	Nottingham Forest (England)	Transfer	Summer	(€700,000)	mff.se
9	FW	(Sweden)	Guillermo Molins	31	Sarpsborg 08 (Norway)	Transfer	Summer	Free	mff.se
33	MF	(Sweden)	Amel Mujanic	19	Hobro IK (Denmark)	Loan	Summer	–	mff.se
23	FW	(Sweden)	Marcus Antonsson	29	Stabæk (Norway)	Loan	Summer	–	mff.se

== Player statistics ==
=== Appearances and goals ===
As of 6 December 2020

Number	Position	Name	2020 Allsvenskan		2019–20 Svenska Cupen 2020–21 Svenska Cupen		2019–20 UEFA Europa League 2020–21 UEFA Europa League		Total	
Number	Position	Name	Appearances	Goals	Appearances	Goals	Appearances	Goals	Appearances	Goals
1	GK	Dušan Melichárek	0	0	0	0	0	0	0	0
2	DF	Eric Larsson	30	2	6	2	5	1	41	5
3	DF	Jonas Knudsen	30	0	5	1	4	0	39	1
4	DF	Behrang Safari	13	0	3	0	3	0	19	0
5	MF	Søren Rieks	25	5	4	1	6	2	35	8
6	MF	Oscar Lewicki	23	0	6	0	5	0	34	0
7	FW	Isaac Kiese Thelin	25	14	4	0	5	3	34	17
8	MF	Arnór Ingvi Traustason	20	1	4	1	4	1	28	3
9	FW	Guillermo Molins	10	1	6	2	0	0	16	3
10	MF	Anders Christiansen	23	13	3	4	4	0	30	17
11	FW	Ola Toivonen	21	8	2	1	2	1	25	10
14	DF	Felix Beijmo	3	0	0	0	0	0	3	0
15	DF	Anel Ahmedhodžić	29	2	6	0	6	0	41	2
16	GK	Mathias Nilsson	0	0	0	0	0	0	0	0
17	DF	Rasmus Bengtsson	1	0	1	0	3	0	5	0
18	MF	Romain Gall	0	0	1	1	0	0	1	1
19	MF	Erdal Rakip	26	1	4	0	4	0	34	1
20	MF	Bonke Innocent	16	0	2	0	1	0	19	0
21	MF	Fouad Bachirou	12	0	4	0	2	0	18	0
22	MF	Adi Nalić	20	2	2	1	5	1	27	4
23	FW	Marcus Antonsson	8	1	5	2	2	0	15	3
24	DF	Lasse Nielsen	15	1	4	1	3	0	22	2
27	GK	Johan Dahlin	14	0	6	0	2	0	22	0
30	GK	Marko Johansson	16	0	0	0	4	0	20	0
31	DF	Franz Brorsson	13	2	0	0	2	0	15	2
32	MF	Jo Inge Berget	23	6	4	0	6	2	33	8
33	MF	Amel Mujanić	0	0	1	0	0	0	1	0
34	MF	Pavle Vagić	0	0	2	1	0	0	2	1
35	MF	Samuel Adrian	1	0	0	0	1	0	2	0
37	FW	Tim Prica	4	0	2	0	0	0	6	0
39	FW	Amin Sarr	17	1	0	0	3	0	20	1
40	DF	Hugo Andersson	0	0	0	0	0	0	0	0

== Competitions ==
=== Allsvenskan ===
==== League table ====
Pos	Team	Pld	W	D	L	GF	GA	GD	Pts	Qualification or relegation
1	Malmö FF (C)	30	17	9	4	64	30	+34	60	Qualification for the Champions League first qualifying round
2	IF Elfsborg	30	12	15	3	49	38	+11	51	Qualification for the Europa Conference League second qualifying round
3	BK Häcken	30	12	13	5	45	29	+16	49	Qualification for the Europa Conference League second qualifying round
4	Djurgårdens IF	30	14	6	10	48	33	+15	48	
5	Mjällby AIF	30	13	8	9	48	44	+4	47	

Source: svenskfotboll.se (in Swedish)
Rules for classification: 1) Points; 2) Goal difference; 3) Goals scored; 4) Head-to-head points; 5) Head-to-head goal difference; 6) Head-to-head away goals scored; 7) Play-off
(Note: Play-off is only played if need to decide champion, teams for relegation or UEFA competition and will be played on a neutral ground).
(C) Champions

==== Results summary ====
Overall								Home						Away					
Pld	W	D	L	GF	GA	GD	Pts	W	D	L	GF	GA	GD	W	D	L	GF	GA	GD
30	17	9	4	64	30	+34	60	11	4	0	34	9	+25	6	5	4	30	21	+9

Source: svenskfotboll.se (in Swedish)

==== Results by round ====
Round	1	2	3	4	5	6	7	8	9	10	11	12	13	14	15	16	17	18	19	20	21	22	23	24	25	26	27	28	29	30
Ground	H	A	H	A	H	A	H	A	H	H	A	A	H	A	H	A	H	H	A	H	A	H	A	A	H	A	H	A	A	H
Result	W	D	D	D	W	L	D	W	W	W	W	W	W	W	W	D	W	D	L	D	D	W	W	L	W	W	W	D	L	W
Position	5	3	4	5	2	7	7	5	2	2	2	2	1	1	1	1	1	1	1	1	1	1	1	1	1	1	1	1	1	1

Source: see below
A = Away; H = Home; W = Win; D = Draw; L = Loss

==== Matches ====
15 June 2020 Matchday 1	Malmö FF	2–0	Mjällby AIF	Malmö
19:00	Christiansen 51', 90+2'	Report		Stadium: Eleda Stadion; Attendance: 0 Referee: Kristoffer Karlsson

18 June 2020 Matchday 2	BK Häcken	1–1	Malmö FF	Gothenburg
19:00	Toivio 90+2'	Report	Molins 23'	Stadium: Bravida Arena; Attendance: 0 Referee: Andreas Ekberg

21 June 2020 Matchday 3	Malmö FF	2–2	Varbergs BoIS	Malmö
14:30	Rieks 7'; Kiese Thelin 83'	Report	Johansson 9'; Norlin 75'	Stadium: Eleda Stadion; Attendance: 0 Referee: Adam Ladebäck

28 June 2020 Matchday 4	AIK	2–2	Malmö FF	Solna
17:30	Larsson 45+1'; Hussein 58'	Report	Kiese Thelin 70', 90' (pen.)	Stadium: Friends Arena; Attendance: 0 Referee: Mohammed Al-Hakim

1 July 2020 Matchday 5	Malmö FF	1–0	Djurgårdens IF	Malmö
19:00	Christiansen 43'	Report		Stadium: Eleda Stadion; Attendance: 0 Referee: Glenn Nyberg

5 July 2020 Matchday 6	IF Elfsborg	1–0	Malmö FF	Borås
14:30	Holst 45+1'	Report		Stadium: Borås Arena; Attendance: 0 Referee: Kristoffer Karlsson

13 July 2020 Matchday 7	Malmö FF	1–1	IFK Norrköping	Malmö
19:00	Rieks 36'	Report	Almqvist 88'	Stadium: Eleda Stadion; Attendance: 0 Referee: Bojan Pandžić

16 July 2020 Matchday 8	Östersunds FK	1–2	Malmö FF	Östersund
19:00	Fritzson 71'	Report	Toivonen 32'; Christiansen 57'	Stadium: Jämtkraft Arena; Attendance: 0 Referee: Granit Maqedonci

19 July 2020 Matchday 9	Malmö FF	2–1	Kalmar FF	Malmö
14:30	Kiese Thelin 63', 89'	Report	Elm 36' (pen.)	Stadium: Eleda Stadion; Attendance: 0 Referee: Mohammed Al-Hakim

23 July 2020 Matchday 10	Malmö FF	3–0	Hammarby IF	Malmö
19:00	Berget 28'; Kiese Thelin 36'; Antonsson 46'	Report		Stadium: Eleda Stadion; Attendance: 0 Referee: Andreas Ekberg

26 July 2020 Matchday 11	IK Sirius	2–5	Malmö FF	Uppsala
17:30	Saeid 18' (pen.); Vecchia 56'	Report	51' (o.g.); Toivonen 65'; Kiese Thelin 85'; Berget 90'; Rieks 90+4'	Stadium: Studenternas IP; Attendance: 0 Referee: Kristoffer Karlsson

2 August 2020 Matchday 12	IFK Göteborg	0–3	Malmö FF	Gothenburg
17:30		Report	Christiansen 5' (pen.); Sarr 18'; Berget 83'	Stadium: Gamla Ullevi; Attendance: 0 Referee: Mohammed Al-Hakim

5 August 2020 Matchday 13	Malmö FF	4–1	Helsingborgs IF	Malmö
19:00	Berget 25' (pen.); Brorsson 45'; Ahmedhodžić 62'; Kiese Thelin 90+4'	Report	van den Hurk 36' (pen.)	Stadium: Eleda Stadion; Attendance: 0 Referee: Andreas Ekberg

9 August 2020 Matchday 14	Falkenbergs FF	0–1	Malmö FF	Falkenberg
14:30		Report	Berget 10'	Stadium: Falcon Alkoholfri Arena; Attendance: 0 Referee: Fredrik Klitte

12 August 2020 Matchday 15	Malmö FF	2–1	Örebro SK	Malmö
19:00	Rakip 43'; Nalić 71'	Report	Larsson 27'	Stadium: Eleda Stadion; Attendance: 0 Referee: Victor Wolf

16 August 2020 Matchday 16	Mjällby AIF	2–2	Malmö FF	Hällevik
17:30	24' (o.g.); Sabovic 66'	Report	Rieks 54'; Christiansen 72'	Stadium: Strandvallen; Attendance: 0 Referee: Adam Ladebäck

23 August 2020 Matchday 17	Malmö FF	2–1	Falkenbergs FF	Malmö
14:30	Rieks 40'; Kiese Thelin 51'	Report	Englund 87'	Stadium: Eleda Stadion; Attendance: 0 Referee: Bojan Pandžić

30 August 2020 Matchday 18	Malmö FF	1–1	IF Elfsborg	Malmö
17:30	Christiansen 1'	Report	Alm 45+4'	Stadium: Eleda Stadion; Attendance: 0 Referee: Glenn Nyberg

10 September 2020 Matchday 19	Örebro SK	3–2	Malmö FF	Örebro
19:00	Seger 9'; Besara 23', 48'	Report	Berget 14'; Nalić 90'	Stadium: Behrn Arena; Attendance: 0 Referee: Victor Wolf

13 September 2020 Matchday 20	Malmö FF	0–0	AIK	Malmö
17:30		Report		Stadium: Eleda Stadion; Attendance: 0 Referee: Kristoffer Karlsson

20 September 2020 Matchday 21	IFK Norrköping	1–1	Malmö FF	Norrköping
17:30	Fransson 90'	Report	Brorsson 50'	Stadium: Nya Parken; Attendance: 0 Referee: Andreas Ekberg

27 September 2020 Matchday 22	Malmö FF	3–0	BK Häcken	Malmö
14:30	Toivonen 6'; Kiese Thelin 16', 51'	Report		Stadium: Eleda Stadion; Attendance: 0 Referee: Mohammed Al-Hakim

4 October 2020 Matchday 23	Kalmar FF	0–4	Malmö FF	Kalmar
17:30		Report	Traustason 6'; Christiansen 41'; Toivonen 61'; Ahmedhodžić 74'	Stadium: Guldfågeln Arena; Attendance: 0 Referee: Bojan Pandžić

19 October 2020 Matchday 24	Djurgårdens IF	3–2	Malmö FF	Stockholm
19:00	Ulvestad 81'; Holmberg 82', 89'	Report	Toivonen 18', 62'	Stadium: Tele2 Arena; Attendance: 0 Referee: Glenn Nyberg

25 October 2020 Matchday 25	Malmö FF	3–1	IFK Göteborg	Malmö
17:30	Christiansen 3' (pen.); Toivonen 35'; 64' (o.g.)	Report	Wernbloom 23'	Stadium: Eleda Stadion; Attendance: 0 Referee: Victor Wolf

2 November 2020 Matchday 26	Helsingborgs IF	0–1	Malmö FF	Helsingborg
19:00		Report	Kiese Thelin 15'	Stadium: Olympia; Attendance: 0 Referee: Glenn Nyberg

8 November 2020 Matchday 27	Malmö FF	4–0	IK Sirius	Malmö
17:30	Kiese Thelin 3'; Christiansen 8'; Toivonen 15'; Larsson 76'	Report		Stadium: Eleda Stadion; Attendance: 0 Referee: Victor Wolf

22 November 2020 Matchday 28	Hammarby IF	2–2	Malmö FF	Stockholm
17:30	Jóhannsson 35'; Kačaniklić 79'	Report	13' (o.g.); Christiansen 45'	Stadium: Tele2 Arena; Attendance: 0 Referee: Andreas Ekberg

29 November 2020 Matchday 29	Varbergs BoIS	3–2	Malmö FF	Varberg
14:30	Ayer 25'; Selmani 80'; Barny 52'	Report	Nielsen 64'; Larsson 90+3'	Stadium: Påskbergsvallen; Attendance: 0 Referee: Granit Maqedonci

6 December 2020 Matchday 30	Malmö FF	4–0	Östersunds FK	Malmö
14:30	Christiansen 6' 29' (pen.); Kiese Thelin 8'; Larsson 34'	Report		Stadium: Eleda Stadion; Attendance: 0 Referee: Adam Ladebäck

=== Svenska Cupen ===
Kickoff times are in UTC+1 unless stated otherwise.

==== 2019–20 ====
The tournament continued from the 2019 season.

===== Group stage =====
Pos	Team	Pld	W	D	L	GF	GA	GD	Pts	Qualification
1	Malmö FF	3	3	0	0	13	1	+12	9	Advance to Knockout stage
2	AFC Eskilstuna	3	1	1	1	7	5	+2	4	
3	Syrianska FC	3	1	0	2	6	15	−9	3	
4	FK Karlskrona	3	0	1	2	3	8	−5	1	

Source: Swedish Football Association
Rules for classification: 1) Points; 2) Goal difference; 3) Goals scored; 4) Head-to-head record; 5) Highest ranked team

23 February 2020 Matchday 1	Malmö FF	8–0	Syrianska FC	Malmö
14:30	Antonsson 6', 47'; Larsson 21'; Traustason 22'; Nalić 50'; Gall 67'; Vagić 69'; Molins 88'	Report		Stadium: Malmö IP; Attendance: 3,569; Referee: Adam Ladebäck

1 March 2020 Matchday 2	FK Karlskrona	1–2	Malmö FF	Karlskrona
14:30	Petersson 26'	Report	Molins 54'; Knudsen 79'	Stadium: Västra Mark IP; Attendance: 2,611; Referee: Fredrik Klitte

8 March 2020 Matchday 3	Malmö FF	3–0	AFC Eskilstuna	Malmö
14:30	Christiansen 70'; Nielsen 82'; Larsson 89'	Report		Stadium: Malmö IP; Attendance: 3,469; Referee: Kristoffer Karlsson

===== Knockout stage =====
25 June 2020 Quarter-final	Malmö FF	4–1	AIK	Malmö
20:15	Christiansen 39', 66', 88'; Rieks 74'	Report	Abraham 7'	Stadium: Eleda Stadion; Attendance: 0 Referee: Kristoffer Karlsson

9 July 2020 Semi-final	Mjällby AIF	0–0 (a.e.t.) (2–4 p)	Malmö FF	Hällevik
20:15		Report		Stadium: Strandvallen; Attendance: 0 Referee: Kristoffer Karlsson
	Penalties
	Batanero (penalty missed); Ogbu (penalty scored); Löfquist (penalty scored); Moro (penalty missed)		Berget (penalty scored); Ahmedhodžić (penalty scored); Bachirou (penalty missed); Molins (penalty scored); Knudsen (penalty scored)

30 July 2020 Final	IFK Göteborg	2–1 (a.e.t.)	Malmö FF	Gothenburg
17:45	Karlsson Lagemyr 86'; Farnerud 94'	Report	Toivonen 40'	Stadium: Gamla Ullevi; Attendance: 0 Referee: Glenn Nyberg

==== 2020–21 ====
===== Qualification stage =====
25 November 2020 Round 2	Lunds BK	0–3	Malmö FF	Malmö
19:00		Report		Stadium: Eleda Stadion *After agreement

=== UEFA Europa League ===
Kickoff times are in UTC+1 unless stated otherwise.

==== 2019–20 ====
The tournament continued from the 2019 season.

===== Knockout phase =====
====== Round of 32 ======
20 February 2020 First Leg	VfL Wolfsburg	2–1	Malmö FF	Wolfsburg
21:00	Brekalo 49'; 62' (o.g.)	Report	Kiese Thelin 47' (pen.)	Stadium: Volkswagen Arena; Attendance: 13,801; Referee: Gediminas Mažeika (Lithuania)

27 February 2020 Second Leg	Malmö FF	0–3 (1–5 agg.)	VfL Wolfsburg	Malmö
21:00		Report	Brekalo 42'; Gerhardt 65'; João Victor 69'	Stadium: Eleda Stadion; Attendance: 20,500; Referee: Willie Collum (Scotland)

==== 2020–21 ====
===== Qualifying phase and play-off round =====
====== First qualifying round ======
27 August 2020	Malmö FF	2–0	KS Cracovia	Malmö
19:00	Berget 1'; Rieks 44'	Report		Stadium: Eleda Stadion; Attendance: 0 Referee: Urs Schnyder

====== Second qualifying round ======
17 September 2020	Honvéd	0–2	Malmö FF	Budapest
21:05		Report	Toivonen 43'; Traustason 86'	Stadium: Hidegkuti Nándor Stadion; Attendance: 0 Referee: Anastasios Papapetrou

====== Third qualifying round ======
24 September 2020	Malmö FF	5–0	Lokomotiva	Malmö
19:00	Kiese Thelin 5', 17'; Nalić 31'; Larsson 52'; Rieks 72'	Report		Stadium: Eleda Stadion; Attendance: 0 Referee: François Letexier

====== Play-off round ======
1 October 2020	Malmö FF	1–3	Granada CF	Malmö
19:00	Berget 45'	Report	Machís 30'; Puertas 58'; Herrera 85'	Stadium: Eleda Stadion; Attendance: 0 Referee: István Kovács

== Non-competitive ==
=== Pre-season ===
Kickoff times are in UTC+1 unless stated otherwise.

24 January 2020	IFK Malmö	0–7	Malmö FF	Malmö
19:00		Report	Ahmedhodžić 7'; Nalić 9', 17'; Andersson 73'; Molins 78', 82'; Rakip 88'	Stadium: Malmö IP

2 February 2020	Malmö FF	1–3	FC Krasnodar	Marbella
16:00	Rakip 115'	Report	Vorotnikov 68'; Utkin 72'; Borodin 103'	Stadium: Estadio Municipal de Marbella

6 February 2020	Malmö FF	2–0	AC Sparta Prague	Marbella
16:00	Antonsson 61'; Berget 77'	Report		Stadium: Marbella Football Center

11 February 2020	Malmö FF	1–3	Varbergs BoIS	Malmö
13:30	Antonsson 2'	Report	Lindner 45'; Ejupi 63', 74'	Stadium: Malmö IP; Referee: Kaspar Sjöberg

15 February 2020	Malmö FF	3–2	Jönköpings Södra IF	Malmö
20:00	Prica 20'; Rieks 34'; Rakip 45'	Report	Kozica 62'; 63' (o.g.)	Stadium: Malmö IP; Referee: Kaspar Sjöberg
