= 2019 Malmö FF season =

Malmö FF
2019 season
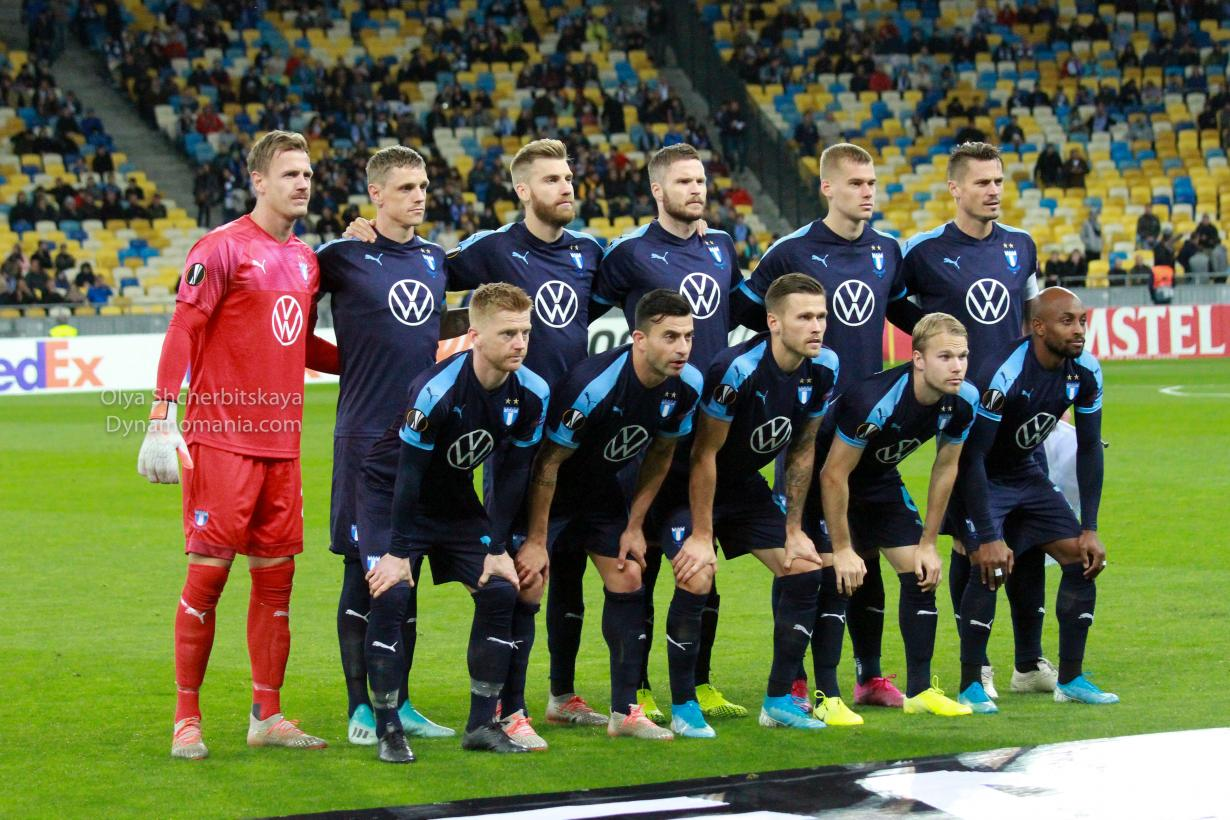
- Chairman: Anders Pålsson
- Head coach: Uwe Rösler
- Stadium: Stadion
- Allsvenskan: 2nd
- 2018–19 Svenska Cupen: Group stage
- 2018–19 UEFA Europa League: Round of 32
- Top goalscorer: League: Markus Rosenberg (13); All: Markus Rosenberg (21)
- Highest home attendance: 21,812 (25 August vs Djurgården, Allsvenskan)
- Lowest home attendance: 2,283 (17 February vs Degerfors, Svenska Cupen)
- Average home league attendance: 16,566
Home colours	Away colours	Third colours

The 2019 season was Malmö FF's 108th in existence, their 84th season in Allsvenskan and their 19th consecutive season in the league. They competed in Allsvenskan where they finished as runners-up, the 2018–19 Svenska Cupen where they were knocked out in the group stage, and the 2018–19 UEFA Europa League where they were knocked out in the round of 32. Malmö FF also participated in two competitions in which the club continued playing in for the 2020 season, the 2019–20 Svenska Cupen and the 2019–20 UEFA Europa League. The season began with the first leg of the round of 32 of the UEFA Europa League on 14 February, league play started on 1 April and concluded on 2 November. The season concluded with the last UEFA Europa League group stage match on 12 December.

Malmö FF managed to qualify for a second consecutive group stage in the UEFA Europa League after having successfully gone through the qualification stage from the first round. For the first time in the club's history, they finished at the top of a European group after having beaten regional rival F.C. Copenhagen on the final match day. On the domestic stage, the club narrowly lost the league title to Djurgårdens IF, finishing one point behind in the league table. In Svenska Cupen, Malmö FF didn't make it across the group stage, having lost against Superettan club Östers IF.

== Players ==
=== Squad ===
Note: Flags indicate national team as defined under FIFA eligibility rules; some limited exceptions apply. Players may hold more than one non-FIFA nationality.

No.	Pos.	Nation	Player
1	GK	CZE	Dušan Melichárek
2	DF	SWE	Eric Larsson
3	DF	ALB	Egzon Binaku
3	DF	DEN	Jonas Knudsen
4	DF	SWE	Behrang Safari (vice captain)
5	MF	DEN	Søren Rieks
6	MF	SWE	Oscar Lewicki
7	MF	COM	Fouad Bachirou
8	MF	ISL	Arnór Ingvi Traustason
9	FW	SWE	Markus Rosenberg (captain)
10	FW	SWE	Carlos Strandberg
11	FW	SWE	Guillermo Molins
14	MF	DEN	Anders Christiansen
15	DF	SWE	Anel Ahmedhodžić
16	DF	SWE	Felix Beijmo
17	DF	SWE	Rasmus Bengtsson

No.	Pos.	Nation	Player
18	MF	USA	Romain Gall
19	MF	SWE	Erdal Rakip
20	MF	NGA	Bonke Innocent
22	MF	SWE	Adi Nalic
23	FW	SWE	Marcus Antonsson
24	DF	DEN	Lasse Nielsen
26	DF	NOR	Andreas Vindheim
27	GK	SWE	Johan Dahlin
31	DF	SWE	Franz Brorsson
32	MF	NOR	Jo Inge Berget
35	MF	SWE	Samuel Adrian
37	FW	SWE	Tim Prica
38	MF	ALB	Laorent Shabani
40	DF	SWE	Hugo Andersson
—	GK	SWE	Jakob Tånnander

=== Players in/out ===
==== In ====
No.	Pos.	Nat.	Name	Age	Moving from	Type	Transfer window	Ends	Transfer fee	Source
22	MF	(Sweden)	Adi Nalic	21	Landskrona BoIS	End of contract	Winter	2022	Free	mff.se
1	GK	(Czech Republic)	Dušan Melichárek	35	Zbrojovka Brno (Czech Republic)	End of contract	Winter	2020	Free	mff.se
15	DF	(Sweden)	Anel Ahmedhodžić	19	Nottingham Forest (England)	Transfer	Winter	2022	Undisclosed	mff.se
19	MF	(Sweden)	Erdal Rakip	22	Benfica (Portugal)	Transfer	Winter	2022	Undisclosed	mff.se
32	MF	(Norway)	Jo Inge Berget	28	New York City (United States)	End of contract	Winter	2022	Free	mff.se
3	DF	(Denmark)	Jonas Knudsen	26	Ipswich Town (England)	End of contract	Summer	2023	Free	mff.se
16	DF	(Sweden)	Felix Beijmo	21	Werder Bremen (Germany)	Loan	Summer	2019		mff.se

==== Out ====
No.	Pos.	Nat.	Name	Age	Moving to	Type	Transfer window	Transfer fee	Source
29	GK	(Sweden)	Fredrik Andersson	30	Örgryte IS	End of contract	Winter	Free	mff.se
33	FW	(Sweden)	Teddy Bergqvist	19	Kristianstad FC	End of contract	Winter	Free	mff.se
—	DF	(Sweden)	Anton Kralj	20	Sandefjord (Norway)	End of contract	Winter	Free	mff.se
—	GK	(Sweden)	Sixten Mohlin	22	Östersunds FK	End of contract	Winter	Free	mff.se
1	GK	(Finland)	Walter Viitala	26	Sandefjord (Norway)	End of contract	Winter	Free	mff.se
34	FW	(Sweden)	Pavle Vagić	18	Mjällby AIF	Loan	Winter		mff.se
39	MF	(Sweden)	Felix Konstandeliasz	19	Mjällby AIF	Loan	Winter		mff.se
—	GK	(Sweden)	Marko Johansson	20	GAIS	Loan	Winter		mff.se
30	GK	(Sweden)	Mathias Nilsson	19	Eskilsminne IF	Loan	Winter		mff.se
40	DF	(Sweden)	Hugo Andersson	20	Trelleborgs FF	Loan	Winter		mff.se
—	GK	(Sweden)	Jakob Tånnander	18	Lunds BK	Loan	Winter		skanesport.se
22	MF	(Sweden)	Adi Nalic	21	AFC Eskilstuna	Loan	Winter		mff.se
3	DF	(Albania)	Egzon Binaku	23	IFK Norrköping	Transfer	Winter	Undisclosed	mff.se
10	FW	(Sweden)	Carlos Strandberg	22	Örebro SK	Loan	Winter		mff.se
26	DF	(Norway)	Andreas Vindheim	23	Sparta Prague (Czech Republic)	Transfer	Summer	(€1,400,000)	mff.se
15	DF	(Sweden)	Anel Ahmedhodžić	20	Hobro IK (Denmark)	Loan	Summer		mff.se
34	FW	(Sweden)	Pavle Vagić	19	AFC Eskilstuna	Loan	Summer		mff.se
35	MF	(Sweden)	Samuel Adrian	21	Kalmar FF	Loan	Summer		mff.se
10	FW	(Sweden)	Carlos Strandberg	23	Al-Hazem (Saudi Arabia)	Loan	Summer		mff.se

== Player statistics ==
=== Appearances and goals ===
As of 12 December 2019

Number	Position	Name	2019 Allsvenskan		2018–19 Svenska Cupen 2019–20 Svenska Cupen		2018–19 UEFA Europa League 2019–20 UEFA Europa League		Total	
Number	Position	Name	Appearances	Goals	Appearances	Goals	Appearances	Goals	Appearances	Goals
1	GK	Dušan Melichárek	2	0	2	0	2	0	6	0
2	DF	Eric Larsson	25	0	3	0	11	0	39	0
3	DF	Egzon Binaku	0	0	1	0	0	0	1	0
3	DF	Jonas Knudsen	11	0	1	0	8	0	20	0
4	DF	Behrang Safari	16	0	2	0	16	1	34	1
5	MF	Søren Rieks	27	9	2	0	14	1	43	10
6	MF	Oscar Lewicki	27	0	3	0	15	2	45	2
7	MF	Fouad Bachirou	24	0	4	0	14	0	42	0
8	MF	Arnór Ingvi Traustason	27	7	3	0	10	0	40	7
9	FW	Markus Rosenberg	27	13	1	0	14	8	42	21
10	FW	Carlos Strandberg	1	0	3	0	2	0	6	0
11	FW	Guillermo Molins	26	6	1	1	13	4	40	11
14	MF	Anders Christiansen	24	9	3	1	12	2	39	12
15	DF	Anel Ahmedhodžić	1	0	2	0	0	0	3	0
16	DF	Felix Beijmo	8	1	1	0	4	0	13	1
17	DF	Rasmus Bengtsson	23	1	2	0	14	5	39	6
18	MF	Romain Gall	16	1	4	1	6	1	26	3
19	MF	Erdal Rakip	14	0	3	0	4	4	21	4
20	MF	Bonke Innocent	11	0	1	0	8	0	20	0
22	MF	Adi Nalic	0	0	1	0	0	0	1	0
23	FW	Marcus Antonsson	26	6	4	3	11	1	41	10
24	DF	Lasse Nielsen	10	0	4	1	15	0	29	1
26	DF	Andreas Vindheim	10	0	1	0	2	0	13	0
27	GK	Johan Dahlin	29	0	2	0	14	0	45	0
31	DF	Franz Brorsson	9	0	0	0	5	1	14	1
32	MF	Jo Inge Berget	24	2	1	1	9	1	34	4
35	MF	Samuel Adrian	0	0	0	0	0	0	0	0
37	FW	Tim Prica	1	0	0	0	1	0	2	0
38	MF	Laorent Shabani	0	0	0	0	0	0	0	0
40	DF	Hugo Andersson	0	0	1	0	0	0	1	0
—	GK	Jakob Tånnander	0	0	0	0	0	0	0	0

== Competitions ==
=== Allsvenskan ===
==== League table ====
Pos	Team	Pld	W	D	L	GF	GA	GD	Pts	Qualification or relegation
1	Djurgårdens IF (C)	30	20	6	4	53	19	+34	66	Qualification for the Champions League first qualifying round
2	Malmö FF	30	19	8	3	56	16	+40	65	Qualification for the Europa League first qualifying round
3	Hammarby IF	30	20	5	5	75	38	+37	65	Qualification for the Europa League first qualifying round
4	AIK	30	19	5	6	47	24	+23	62	
5	IFK Norrköping	30	16	9	5	54	26	+28	57	

Source: svenskfotboll.se (in Swedish)
Rules for classification: 1) Points; 2) Goal difference; 3) Goals scored; 4) Head-to-head points; 5) Head-to-head goal difference; 6) Head-to-head away goals scored; 7) Play-off
(Note: Play-off is only played if need to decide champion, teams for relegation or UEFA competition and will be played on a neutral ground).
(C) Champions

==== Results summary ====
Overall								Home						Away					
Pld	W	D	L	GF	GA	GD	Pts	W	D	L	GF	GA	GD	W	D	L	GF	GA	GD
30	19	8	3	56	16	+40	65	12	2	1	34	7	+27	7	6	2	22	9	+13

Source: svenskfotboll.se (in Swedish)

==== Results by round ====
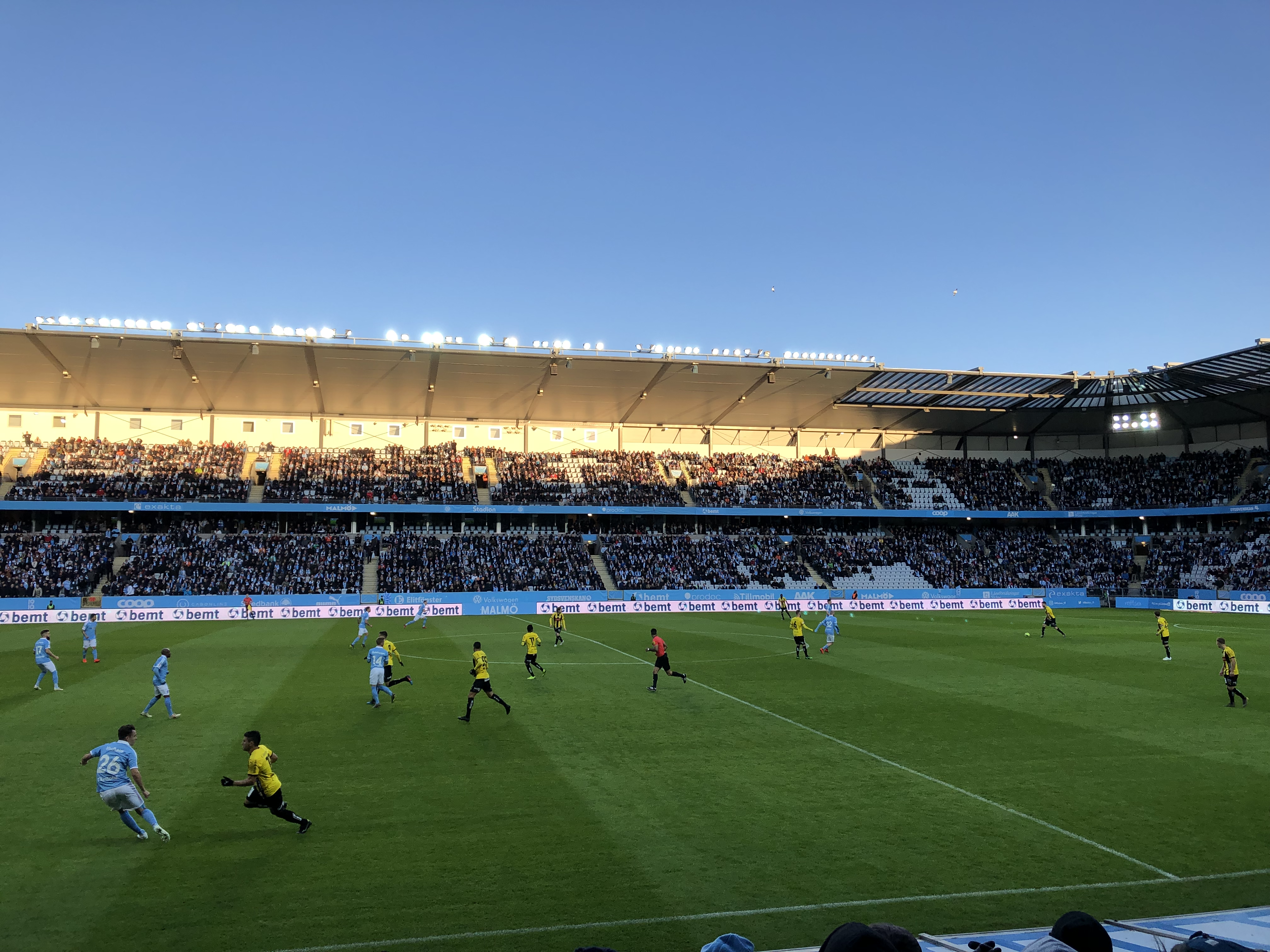
Malmö FF's opening game of the 2019 Allsvenskan season against BK Häcken.

Round	1	2	3	4	5	6	7	8	9	10	11	12	13	14	15	16	17	18	19	20	21	22	23	24	25	26	27	28	29	30
Ground	H	A	H	A	H	A	A	H	A	H	H	A	A	H	A	H	A	H	A	H	H	A	H	A	H	A	H	A	H	A
Result	D	L	W	W	W	D	W	W	D	W	W	W	D	W	D	D	D	W	D	W	L	W	W	W	W	W	W	L	W	W
Position	10	12	8	3	2	2	1	1	1	1	1	1	1	1	1	2	3	2	3	2	4	3	3	2	2	2	1	3	2	2

Source: see below
A = Away; H = Home; W = Win; D = Draw; L = Loss

==== Matches ====
1 April 2019 Matchday 1	Malmö FF	1–1	BK Häcken	Malmö
19:00	Antonsson 46'	Report	Irandust 76'	Stadium: Stadion; Attendance: 17,543; Referee: Mohammed Al-Hakim

6 April 2019 Matchday 2	GIF Sundsvall	3–1	Malmö FF	Sundsvall
16:00	Sema 65'; Hallenius 80', 87' (pen.)	Report	Traustason 79'	Stadium: Idrottsparken; Attendance: 4,112; Referee: Kristoffer Karlsson

14 April 2019 Matchday 3	Malmö FF	2–0	Östersunds FK	Malmö
17:30	Antonsson 32'; Rosenberg 62'	Report		Stadium: Stadion; Attendance: 14,042; Referee: Stefan Johannesson

20 April 2019 Matchday 4	IK Sirius	0–1	Malmö FF	Uppsala
16:00		Report	Rieks 46'	Stadium: Studenternas IP; Attendance: 4,292; Referee: Glenn Nyberg

24 April 2019 Matchday 5	Malmö FF	4–1	Hammarby IF	Malmö
19:00	Traustason 53'; Antonsson 61'; Rieks 71'; Rosenberg 83'	Report	Tanković 13'	Stadium: Stadion; Attendance: 16,065; Referee: Kristoffer Karlsson

28 April 2019 Matchday 6	IFK Norrköping	1–1	Malmö FF	Norrköping
17:30	Nyman 5'	Report	Molins 4'	Stadium: Nya Parken; Attendance: 10,197; Referee: Bojan Pandžić

5 May 2019 Matchday 7	Falkenbergs FF	1–2	Malmö FF	Falkenberg
15:00	Söderström 45+2'	Report	Rosenberg 6', 25'	Stadium: Falcon Alkoholfri Arena; Attendance: 5,252; Referee: Mohammed Al-Hakim

12 May 2019 Matchday 8	Malmö FF	4–1	IF Elfsborg	Malmö
17:30	Rosenberg 41', 90+3'; Christiansen 62'; Rieks 88'	Report	Ishizaki 58'	Stadium: Stadion; Attendance: 16,139; Referee: Victor Wolf

16 May 2019 Matchday 9	IFK Göteborg	0–0	Malmö FF	Gothenburg
19:00		Report		Stadium: Gamla Ullevi; Attendance: 17,083; Referee: Martin Strömbergsson

19 May 2019 Matchday 10	Malmö FF	1–0	Kalmar FF	Malmö
15:00	Christiansen 74'	Report		Stadium: Stadion; Attendance: 16,267; Referee: Bojan Pandžić

25 May 2019 Matchday 11	Malmö FF	5–0	AFC Eskilstuna	Malmö
16:00	Molins 26', 65'; Antonsson 52'; Rieks 71'; Christiansen 81'	Report		Stadium: Stadion; Attendance: 12,545; Referee: Andreas Ekberg

28 May 2019 Matchday 18	Malmö FF	2–1	GIF Sundsvall	Malmö
19:00	42' (o.g.); Christiansen 77'	Report	Konate 32'	Stadium: Stadion; Attendance: 12,635; Referee: Kristoffer Karlsson

2 June 2019 Matchday 12	Helsingborgs IF	0–1	Malmö FF	Helsingborg
17:30		Report	Rosenberg 18'	Stadium: Olympia; Attendance: 16,127; Referee: Bojan Pandžić

30 June 2019 Matchday 13	AIK	0–0	Malmö FF	Solna
15:00		Report		Stadium: Friends Arena; Attendance: 19,141; Referee: Stefan Johannesson

6 July 2019 Matchday 14	Malmö FF	2–1	Örebro SK	Malmö
19:00	Antonsson 15'; Christiansen 68'	Report	Rogić 19' (pen.)	Stadium: Stadion; Attendance: 11,521; Referee: Magnus Lindgren

14 July 2019 Matchday 15	Djurgårdens IF	1–1	Malmö FF	Stockholm
17:30	Karlström 68'	Report	Molins 57'	Stadium: Tele2 Arena; Attendance: 18,316; Referee: Kristoffer Karlsson

21 July 2019 Matchday 16	Malmö FF	1–1	IK Sirius	Malmö
15:00	Christiansen 38'	Report	Haglund 26'	Stadium: Stadion; Attendance: 17,474; Referee: Glenn Nyberg

28 July 2019 Matchday 17	Östersunds FK	0–0	Malmö FF	Östersund
15:00		Report		Stadium: Jämtkraft Arena; Attendance: 5,314; Referee: Martin Strömbergsson

11 August 2019 Matchday 19	BK Häcken	1–1	Malmö FF	Gothenburg
15:00	Friberg 79'	Report	Christiansen 57'	Stadium: Bravida Arena; Attendance: 4,254; Referee: Mohammed Al-Hakim

18 August 2019 Matchday 20	Malmö FF	5–0	Falkenbergs FF	Malmö
17:30	Gall 7'; Rosenberg 30'; Traustason 54', 57'; Molins 66'	Report		Stadium: Stadion; Attendance: 14,714; Referee: Adam Ladebäck

25 August 2019 Matchday 21	Malmö FF	0–1	Djurgårdens IF	Malmö
17:30		Report	Buya Turay 60'	Stadium: Stadion; Attendance: 21,812; Referee: Glenn Nyberg

1 September 2019 Matchday 22	Kalmar FF	0–5	Malmö FF	Kalmar
15:00		Report	Rieks 3'; Rosenberg 32', 51' (pen.); Traustason 60'; Berget 76'	Stadium: Guldfågeln Arena; Attendance: 6,457; Referee: Mohammed Al-Hakim

15 September 2019 Matchday 23	Malmö FF	1–0	IFK Norrköping	Malmö
17:30	Rieks 56'	Report		Stadium: Stadion; Attendance: 16,593; Referee: Andreas Ekberg

22 September 2019 Matchday 24	IF Elfsborg	0–3	Malmö FF	Borås
17:30		Report	Molins 62'; Berget 82' (pen.); Antonsson 89'	Stadium: Borås Arena; Attendance: 6,496; Referee: Magnus Lindgren

26 September 2019 Matchday 25	Malmö FF	3–0	Helsingborgs IF	Malmö
19:00	Rieks 13', 32'; Rosenberg 38'	Report		Stadium: Stadion; Attendance: 21,294; Referee: Glenn Nyberg

29 September 2019 Matchday 26	AFC Eskilstuna	0–1	Malmö FF	Eskilstuna
17:30		Report	Christiansen 82'	Stadium: Tunavallen; Attendance: 2,167; Referee: Patrik Eriksson

6 October 2019 Matchday 27	Malmö FF	1–0	IFK Göteborg	Malmö
17:30	Beijmo 62'	Report		Stadium: Stadion; Attendance: 18,473; Referee: Martin Strömbergsson

20 October 2019 Matchday 28	Hammarby IF	2–0	Malmö FF	Stockholm
15:00	Kačaniklić 15'; Magyar 88'	Report		Stadium: Tele2 Arena; Attendance: 29,117; Referee: Glenn Nyberg

28 October 2019 Matchday 29	Malmö FF	2–0	AIK	Malmö
19:00	Christiansen 78'; Traustason 89'	Report		Stadium: Stadion; Attendance: 21,379; Referee: Bojan Pandžić

2 November 2019 Matchday 30	Örebro SK	0–5	Malmö FF	Örebro
13:00		Report	Bengtsson 11'; Traustason 15'; Rieks 57'; Rosenberg 61', 67'	Stadium: Behrn Arena; Attendance: 7,153; Referee: Victor Wolf

=== Svenska Cupen ===
Kickoff times are in UTC+1 unless stated otherwise.

==== 2018–19 ====
The tournament continued from the 2018 season.

===== Group stage =====
Pos	Team	Pld	W	D	L	GF	GA	GD	Pts	Qualification
1	Östers IF	3	3	0	0	7	3	+4	9	Advance to Knockout stage
2	Malmö FF	3	2	0	1	6	4	+2	6	
3	Falkenbergs FF	3	1	0	2	3	5	−2	3	
4	Degerfors IF	3	0	0	3	4	8	−4	0	

Updated to match(es) played on 2 March 2019. Source: Swedish Football Association
Rules for classification: 1) Points; 2) Goal difference; 3) Goals scored; 4) Head-to-head record; 5) Highest ranked team

17 February 2019 Matchday 1	Malmö FF	3–2	Degerfors IF	Lund
15:00	Antonsson 40'; Nielsen 71'; Gall 81'	Report	Alm 43'; Ladan 78' (pen.)	Stadium: Klostergårdens IP; Attendance: 2,283; Referee: Fredrik Klitte

25 February 2019 Matchday 2	Östers IF	2–1	Malmö FF	Växjö
19:00	Kapčević 52'; Ahrn 89'	Report	Antonsson 54' (pen.)	Stadium: Tipshallen; Attendance: 2,055; Referee: Robert Daradić

3 March 2019 Matchday 3	Malmö FF	2–0	Falkenbergs FF	Malmö
16:00	Antonsson 3'; Christiansen 41'	Report		Stadium: Stadion; Attendance: 2,654; Referee: Mohammed Al-Hakim

==== 2019–20 ====
The tournament continued into the 2020 season.

===== Qualification stage =====
10 November 2019 Round 2	IFK Värnamo	0–2	Malmö FF	Värnamo
16:00		Report	Berget 57'; Molins 62'	Stadium: Finnvedsvallen; Attendance: 2,975; Referee: Robert Daradić

=== UEFA Europa League ===
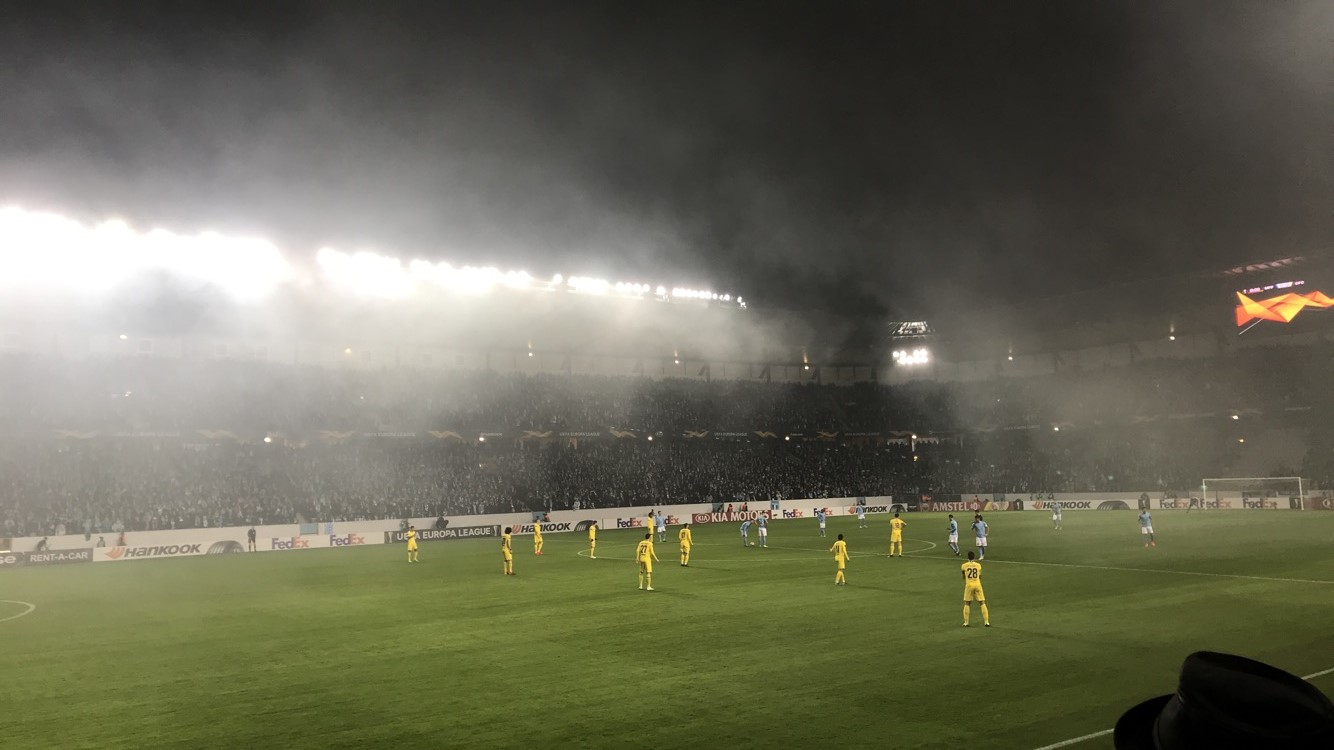
Malmö FF's home game against Chelsea F.C. in February 2019.

Kickoff times are in UTC+1 unless stated otherwise.

==== 2018–19 ====
The tournament continued from the 2018 season.

===== Knockout phase =====
====== Round of 32 ======
14 February 2019 First Leg	Malmö FF	1–2	Chelsea F.C.	Malmö
21:00	Christiansen 80'	Report	Barkley 30'; Giroud 58'	Stadium: Stadion; Attendance: 20,312; Referee: Aleksei Kulbakov (Belarus)

21 February 2019 Second Leg	Chelsea F.C.	3–0 (5–1 agg.)	Malmö FF	London
20:00 UTC±0	Giroud 55'; Barkley 74'; Hudson-Odoi 84'	Report		Stadium: Stamford Bridge; Referee: Orel Grinfeld (Israel)

==== 2019–20 ====
The tournament continued into the 2020 season.

===== Qualifying phase and play-off round =====
====== First qualifying round ======
11 July 2019 First leg	Malmö FF	7–0	Ballymena United	Malmö
19:00	Rosenberg 31', 33', 48'; Rakip 44', 74'; Brorsson 46'; Molins 54'	Report		Stadium: Stadion; Attendance: 8,667; Referee: Igor Pajac

18 July 2019 Second Leg	Ballymena United	0–4 (0–11 agg.)	Malmö FF	Ballymena
19:45 UTC±0		Report	Safari 27'; Molins 52'; Rakip 68'; Gall 79' (pen.)	Stadium: Ballymena Showgrounds; Referee: Oskari Hämäläinen

====== Second qualifying round ======
25 July 2019 First leg	NK Domžale	2–2	Malmö FF	Domžale
20:45	Nicholson 37'; Gnezda Čerin 48'	Report	Bengtsson 42'; Antonsson 52'	Stadium: Domžale Sports Park; Attendance: 2,043; Referee: Michael Fabri

1 August 2019 Second Leg	Malmö FF	3–2 (5–4 agg.)	NK Domžale	Malmö
19:00	Lewicki 21'; Rosenberg 32'; Bengtsson 83'	Report	Nicholson 12'; Karič 45+1'	Stadium: Stadion; Attendance: 12,348; Referee: Amaury Delerue

====== Third qualifying round ======
8 August 2019 First leg	Malmö FF	3–0	HŠK Zrinjski Mostar	Malmö
19:00	Bengtsson 36'; Christiansen 66'; Rieks 74'	Report		Stadium: Stadion; Attendance: 14,103; Referee: Stuart Attwell

15 August 2019 Second Leg	HŠK Zrinjski Mostar	1–0 (1–3 agg.)	Malmö FF	Široki Brijeg
20:00	Šovšić 90+1' (pen.)	Report		Stadium: Stadion Pecara; Referee: Artyom Kuchin

====== Play-off round ======
22 August 2019 First leg	Malmö FF	3–0	Bnei Yehuda Tel Aviv F.C.	Malmö
19:00	Rosenberg 36'; Bengtsson 40'; Lewicki 47'	Report		Stadium: Stadion; Attendance: 13,956; Referee: Paweł Raczkowski

29 August 2019 Second Leg	Bnei Yehuda Tel Aviv F.C.	0–1 (0–4 agg.)	Malmö FF	Petah Tikva
19:00		Report	Molins 7'	Stadium: HaMoshava Stadium; Referee: Serdar Gözübüyük

===== Group stage =====
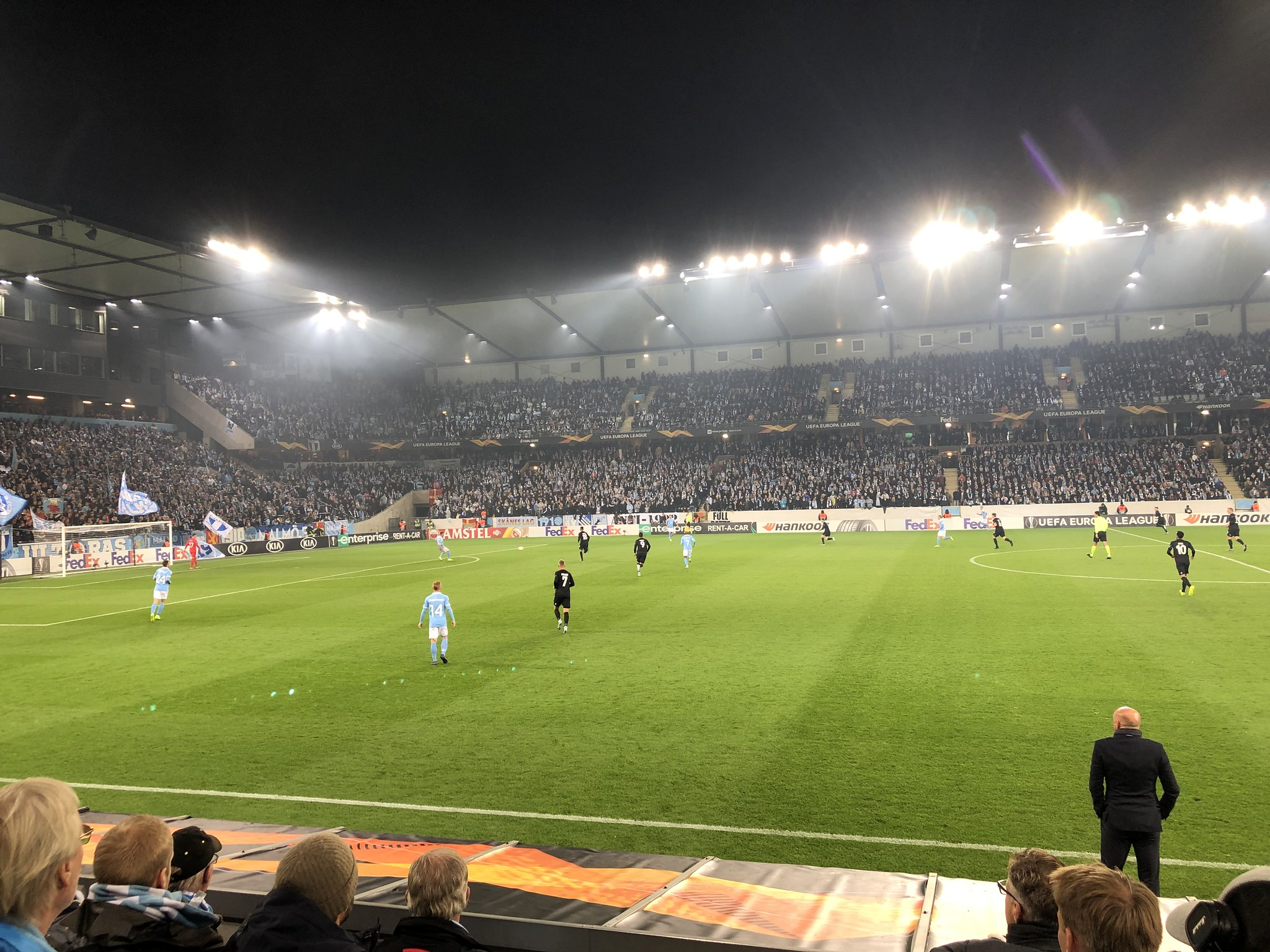
Malmö FF's home game against F.C. Copenhagen in October 2019.

Times up to 27 October 2019 (matchdays 1–3) are CEST (UTC+2), thereafter (matchdays 4–6) times are CET (UTC+1).

Pos	Team	Pld	W	D	L	GF	GA	GD	Pts	Qualification	MAL	KOB	DKV	LUG
1	(Sweden) Malmö FF	6	3	2	1	8	6	+2	11	Advance to knockout phase	—	1–1	4–3	2–1
2	(Denmark) Copenhagen	6	2	3	1	5	4	+1	9	Advance to knockout phase	0–1	—	1–1	1–0
3	(Ukraine) Dynamo Kyiv	6	1	4	1	7	7	0	7		1–0	1–1	—	1–1
4	(Switzerland) Lugano	6	0	3	3	2	5	−3	3		0–0	0–1	0–0	—

Source: UEFA
Rules for classification: Group stage tiebreakers

19 September 2019 Matchday 1	FC Dynamo Kyiv	1–0	Malmö FF	Kyiv
18:55	Buyalskyi 84'	Report		Stadium: Olimpiyskiy National Sports Complex; Attendance: 17,159; Referee: Aleksandar Stavrev

3 October 2019 Matchday 2	Malmö FF	1–1	F.C. Copenhagen	Malmö
21:00	Rosenberg 55'	Report	45+5' (o.g.)	Stadium: Stadion; Attendance: 19,884; Referee: Deniz Aytekin

24 October 2019 Matchday 3	Malmö FF	2–1	FC Lugano	Malmö
21:00	Berget 13' (pen.); Molins 32'	Report	Gerndt 50'	Stadium: Stadion; Attendance: 16,789; Referee: Rob Harvey

7 November 2019 Matchday 4	FC Lugano	0–0	Malmö FF	St. Gallen
18:55		Report		Stadium: Kybunpark; Attendance: 1,875; Referee: Giorgi Kruashvili

28 November 2019 Matchday 5	Malmö FF	4–3	FC Dynamo Kyiv	Malmö
21:00	Bengtsson 2'; Rosenberg 48', 90+6'; Rakip 57'	Report	Mykolenko 18'; Tsyhankov 39'; Verbič 77'	Stadium: Stadion; Attendance: 19,224; Referee: Pavel Královec

12 December 2019 Matchday 6	F.C. Copenhagen	0–1	Malmö FF	Copenhagen
18:55		Report	77' (o.g.)	Stadium: Parken Stadium; Attendance: 32,941; Referee: Davide Massa

== Non-competitive ==
=== Pre-season ===
Kickoff times are in UTC+1 unless stated otherwise.

Malmö FF were initially scheduled to return to Bradenton, Florida for pre-season camp. However, after advancing to a Europa League round of 32 match-up with Chelsea to be played in the midst of pre-season, the club rescheduled camp to Marbella to reduce travel.

18 January 2019	Malmö FF	2–2	IFK Malmö	Malmö
17:00	Molins 43' (pen.); Binaku 84'	Report	Zadran 33'; Marques 68'	Stadium: Plan 9

25 January 2019	Lyngby Boldklub	1–5	Malmö FF	Kongens Lyngby
13:00	Kornvig 90'	Report	Molins 3' (pen.), 17'; Antonsson 50'; Strandberg 60'; Rieks 100'

3 February 2019	Malmö FF	0–2	FC Krasnodar	Marbella
16:00		Report	Claesson 81'; Ari 87' (pen.)	Stadium: Dama de Noche

4 February 2019	Malmö FF	1–1	FC Krasnodar	Marbella
15:00	Strandberg 8'	Report	13'	Stadium: Dama de Noche

8 February 2019	Malmö FF	0–0	FC Dynamo Kyiv	Marbella
14:00				Stadium: Estadio Municipal de Marbella

5 March 2019	Brentford F.C.	3–4	Malmö FF	London
19:45 UTC±0	Marcondes 55'; C. Dasilva 67'; J. Dasilva 76'	Report	Strandberg 24', 47', 53'; Nalic 74'	Stadium: Griffin Park

9 March 2019	Malmö FF	2–1	Kalmar FF	Malmö
15:00	Larsson 6'; Antonsson 70'	Report	Romário 57'	Stadium: Stadion

15 March 2019	IFK Norrköping	4–1	Malmö FF	Norrköping
16:00	Larsson 36'; 41' (o.g.); Holmberg 45+1'; Almqvist 87'	Report	Molins 14'	Stadium: Nya Parken

21 March 2019	AZ Alkmaar	0–1	Malmö FF	Wijdewormer
16:00		Report	Berget 10'	Stadium: AFAS Trainingscomplex

=== Mid-season ===
Kickoff times are in UTC+2 unless stated otherwise.

20 June 2019	Malmö FF	2–1	SønderjyskE Fodbold	Malmö
14:00	Rosenberg 15'; 33' (o.g.)	Report	Absalonsen 64' (pen.)	Stadium: Stadion

25 June 2019	Malmö FF	1–1	HNK Gorica	Malmö
19:00	Antonsson 73'	Report	Zwoliński 33'	Stadium: Stadion

7 July 2019	Malmö FF	2–4	Lyngby Boldklub	Malmö
13:00	Molins 3'; Gall 4'	Report	Riel 20', 47'; Christjansen 55'; Gut 64'

16 October 2019	Malmö FF	3–0	Torns IF	Malmö
		Report		Stadium: Stadion

=== Post-season ===
Kickoff times are in UTC+1 unless stated otherwise.

5 December 2019	Lincoln Red Imps F.C.	0–5	Malmö FF	La Línea de la Concepción
18:00		Report	Knudsen 34'; Rosenberg 42' (pen.); Gall 46'; Antonsson 49'; Molins 62' (pen.)	Stadium: Estadio Municipal de La Línea de la Concepción
