= 2018 Malmö FF season =

Malmö FF
2018 season
- Chairman: Håkan Jeppsson
- Head coach: Magnus Pehrsson (until 14 May); Daniel Andersson (14 May until 12 June); Uwe Rösler (from 12 June)
- Stadium: Stadion
- Allsvenskan: 3rd
- 2017–18 Svenska Cupen: Runners-up
- 2018–19 UEFA Champions League: Third qualifying round
- Top goalscorer: League: Markus Rosenberg (13); All: Markus Rosenberg (18)
- Highest home attendance: 20,072 (9 April vs AIK, Allsvenskan)
- Lowest home attendance: 3,155 (4 March vs IF Brommapojkarna, Svenska Cupen)
- Average home league attendance: 14,921
Home colours	Away colours

The 2018 season was Malmö FF's 107th in existence, their 83rd season in Allsvenskan and their 18th consecutive season in the league. They competed in Allsvenskan where they finished third, 2017–18 Svenska Cupen where they finished as runners-up, and the 2018–19 UEFA Champions League where they were knocked out in the third qualifying round. Malmö FF also participated in two competitions in which the club continued playing in for the 2019 season, the 2018–19 Svenska Cupen and the 2018–19 UEFA Europa League. The season began with the group stage of Svenska Cupen on 18 February, league play started on 2 April and concluded on 11 November. The season concluded with the last UEFA Europa League group stage match on 13 December.

The club's chairman, Håkan Jeppsson, died unexpectedly on 7 December, a week before the last match of the season. Malmö FF won five Swedish championships and participated in two UEFA Champions League group stages, as well as two UEFA Europa League group stages, under his reign. For the first time in the history of the club, Malmö FF managed to qualify for the knock-out stages of the UEFA Europa League. It was also the first time, and third time in total, since the 1986–87 European Cup Winners' Cup that the club qualified for European knock-out matches after the new year. On the domestic stage, Malmö FF ended the season in third place, having had a difficult start to the league season.

== Players ==
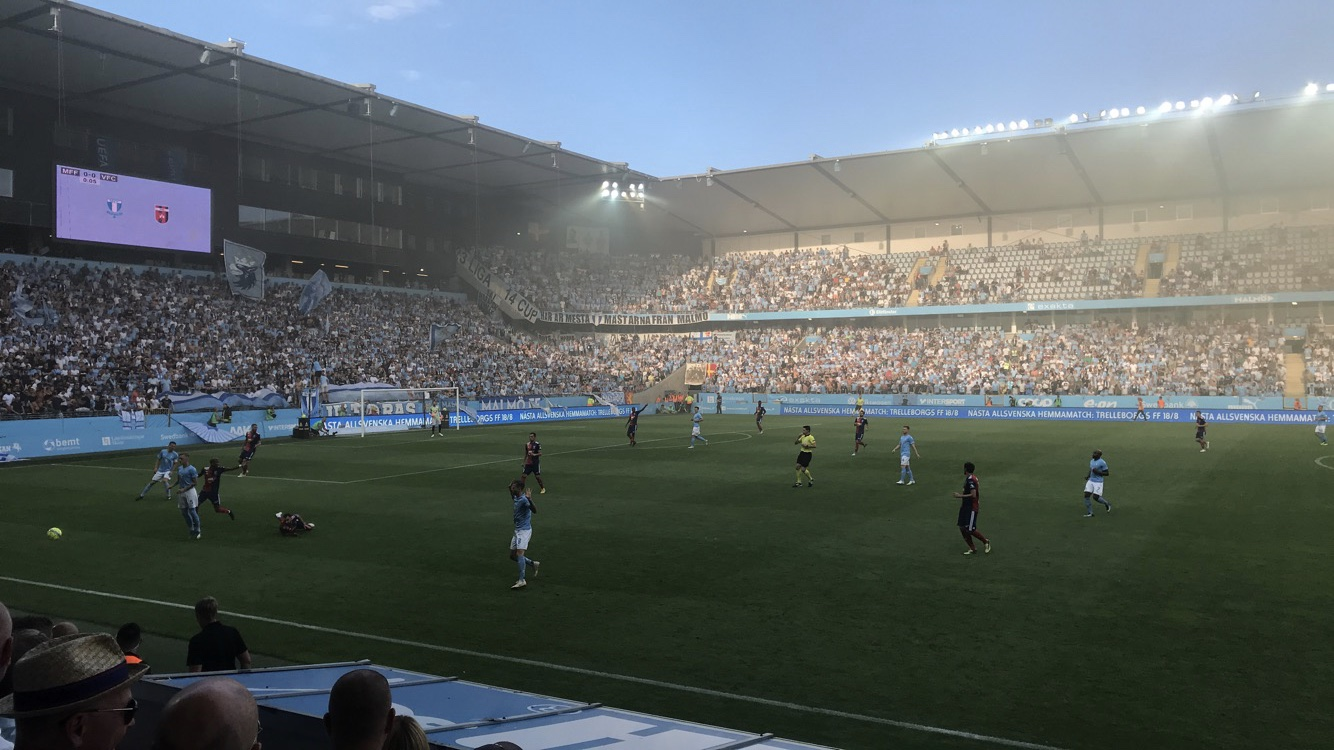
Malmö FF playing a Champions League qualifier against MOL Vidi FC in August 2018.

=== Squad ===
Note: Flags indicate national team as defined under FIFA eligibility rules; some limited exceptions apply. Players may hold more than one non-FIFA nationality.

No.	Pos.	Nation	Player
1	GK	FIN	Walter Viitala
2	DF	SWE	Eric Larsson
3	DF	ALB	Egzon Binaku
4	DF	SWE	Behrang Safari (vice captain)
5	MF	DEN	Søren Rieks
6	MF	SWE	Oscar Lewicki
7	MF	COM	Fouad Bachirou
8	MF	ISL	Arnór Ingvi Traustason
9	FW	SWE	Markus Rosenberg (captain)
10	FW	SWE	Carlos Strandberg
11	FW	SWE	Alexander Jeremejeff
11	FW	SWE	Guillermo Molins
14	MF	DEN	Anders Christiansen
17	DF	SWE	Rasmus Bengtsson
18	MF	USA	Romain Gall
20	MF	NGR	Bonke Innocent

No.	Pos.	Nation	Player
21	MF	GHA	Kingsley Sarfo
22	MF	SWE	Isak Ssewankambo
23	FW	SWE	Marcus Antonsson
24	DF	DEN	Lasse Nielsen
26	DF	NOR	Andreas Vindheim
27	GK	SWE	Johan Dahlin
29	GK	SWE	Fredrik Andersson
30	GK	SWE	Mathias Nilsson
31	DF	SWE	Franz Brorsson
32	MF	SWE	Mattias Svanberg
34	MF	SWE	Pavle Vagić
35	MF	SWE	Samuel Adrian
37	FW	SWE	Tim Prica
38	MF	ALB	Laorent Shabani
39	MF	SWE	Felix Konstandeliasz
40	DF	SWE	Hugo Andersson

=== Players in/out ===
==== In ====
No.	Pos.	Nat.	Name	Age	Moving from	Type	Transfer window	Ends	Transfer fee	Source
2	DF	(Sweden)	Eric Larsson	26	GIF Sundsvall	End of contract	Winter	2021	Free	mff.se
8	MF	(Iceland)	Arnór Ingvi Traustason	24	Rapid Wien (Austria)	Transfer	Winter	2021	Undisclosed	mff.se
3	DF	(Albania)	Egzon Binaku	22	BK Häcken	Transfer	Winter	2021	(€800,000)	mff.se
7	MF	(Comoros)	Fouad Bachirou	27	Östersunds FK	Transfer	Winter	2021	(€700,000)	mff.se
5	MF	(Denmark)	Søren Rieks	30	IFK Göteborg	End of contract	Winter	2020	Free	mff.se
22	MF	(Sweden)	Isak Ssewankambo	22	Molde (Norway)	Loan	Winter	2018	–	mff.se
14	MF	(Denmark)	Anders Christiansen	28	Gent (Belgium)	Transfer	Summer	2022	Undisclosed	mff.se
23	FW	(Sweden)	Marcus Antonsson	27	Leeds United (England)	Transfer	Summer	2021	Undisclosed	mff.se
18	MF	(United States)	Romain Gall	23	GIF Sundsvall	Transfer	Summer	2022	(€500,000)	mff.se
11	FW	(Sweden)	Guillermo Molins	29	Panathinaikos (Greece)	End of contract	Summer	2021	Free	mff.se
1	GK	(Finland)	Walter Viitala	26	Viborg FF (Denmark)	Transfer	Summer	2018	Free	mff.se

==== Out ====
No.	Pos.	Nat.	Name	Age	Moving to	Type	Transfer window	Transfer fee	Source
3	DF	(Sweden)	Anton Tinnerholm	26	New York City (United States)	End of contract	Winter	Free	mff.se
25	DF	(Uruguay)	Felipe Carvalho	24	Vålerenga (Norway)	End of contract	Winter	Free	mff.se
–	GK	(Sweden)	Jakob Tånnander	17	Lunds BK	Loan	Winter	–	sydsvenskan.se
10	MF	(Norway)	Magnus Wolff Eikrem	27	Seattle Sounders (United States)	End of contract	Winter	Free	mff.se
23	MF	(Norway)	Jo Inge Berget	27	New York City (United States)	End of contract	Winter	Free	mff.se
5	MF	(Sweden)	Erdal Rakip	21	Benfica (Portugal)	End of contract	Winter	Free	mff.se
–	DF	(Sweden)	Anton Kralj	19	Gefle IF	Loan	Winter	–	mff.se
7	MF	(Denmark)	Anders Christiansen	27	Gent (Belgium)	Transfer	Winter	Undisclosed	mff.se
–	GK	(Sweden)	Sixten Mohlin	21	Dalkurd FF	Loan	Winter	–	mff.se
14	MF	(Sweden)	Erik Andersson	20	Trelleborgs FF	Transfer	Winter	Undisclosed	mff.se
37	DF	(Sweden)	Dennis Hadžikadunić	19	Trelleborgs FF	Loan	Winter	–	mff.se
33	FW	(Sweden)	Teddy Bergqvist	18	Varbergs BoIS	Loan	Winter	–	mff.se
21	MF	(Ghana)	Kingsley Sarfo	23	Free agent	Discharged	–	–	mff.se
32	MF	(Sweden)	Mattias Svanberg	19	Bologna (Italy)	Transfer	Summer	(€4,500,000)	mff.se
37	DF	(Sweden)	Dennis Hadžikadunić	20	FC Rostov (Russia)	Transfer	Summer	(€1,000,000)	mff.se
11	FW	(Sweden)	Alexander Jeremejeff	24	BK Häcken	Transfer	Summer	(€484,000)	mff.se
34	MF	(Sweden)	Pavle Vagić	18	Jönköpings Södra	Loan	Summer	–	mff.se

== Player statistics ==
=== Appearances and goals ===
As of 17 December 2018

Number	Position	Name	2018 Allsvenskan		2017–18 Svenska Cupen 2018–19 Svenska Cupen		2018–19 UEFA Champions League 2018–19 UEFA Europa League		Total	
Number	Position	Name	Appearances	Goals	Appearances	Goals	Appearances	Goals	Appearances	Goals
1	GK	Walter Viitala	2	0	0	0	0	0	2	0
2	DF	Eric Larsson	25	2	6	0	10	1	41	3
3	DF	Egzon Binaku	18	0	4	0	2	0	24	0
4	DF	Behrang Safari	21	0	6	0	13	0	40	0
5	MF	Søren Rieks	26	10	7	0	14	0	47	10
6	MF	Oscar Lewicki	28	0	6	0	13	1	47	1
7	MF	Fouad Bachirou	22	0	7	0	13	0	42	0
8	MF	Arnór Ingvi Traustason	22	4	5	1	12	2	39	7
9	FW	Markus Rosenberg	27	13	6	2	13	4	46	19
10	FW	Carlos Strandberg	19	7	6	2	6	3	31	12
11	FW	Alexander Jeremejeff	13	1	6	2	2	0	21	3
11	FW	Guillermo Molins	0	0	1	1	0	0	1	1
14	MF	Anders Christiansen	15	2	1	0	12	1	28	3
17	DF	Rasmus Bengtsson	13	0	5	1	13	0	31	1
18	MF	Romain Gall	12	6	1	0	5	0	18	6
20	MF	Bonke Innocent	15	0	1	0	5	0	21	0
21	MF	Kingsley Sarfo	0	0	0	0	0	0	0	0
22	MF	Isak Ssewankambo	5	0	0	0	0	0	5	0
23	FW	Marcus Antonsson	15	8	1	0	12	5	28	13
24	DF	Lasse Nielsen	27	0	7	1	14	0	48	1
26	DF	Andreas Vindheim	10	1	4	0	11	1	25	2
27	GK	Johan Dahlin	25	0	7	0	14	0	46	0
29	GK	Fredrik Andersson	4	0	0	0	0	0	4	0
30	GK	Mathias Nilsson	0	0	0	0	0	0	0	0
31	DF	Franz Brorsson	23	0	3	0	10	0	36	0
32	MF	Mattias Svanberg	12	2	6	1	0	0	18	3
34	MF	Pavle Vagić	1	0	0	0	0	0	1	0
35	MF	Samuel Adrian	9	0	0	0	2	0	11	0
37	FW	Tim Prica	0	0	0	0	0	0	0	0
38	MF	Laorent Shabani	0	0	0	0	0	0	0	0
39	MF	Felix Konstandeliasz	3	0	0	0	0	0	3	0
40	DF	Hugo Andersson	4	1	1	0	0	0	5	1

== Competitions ==
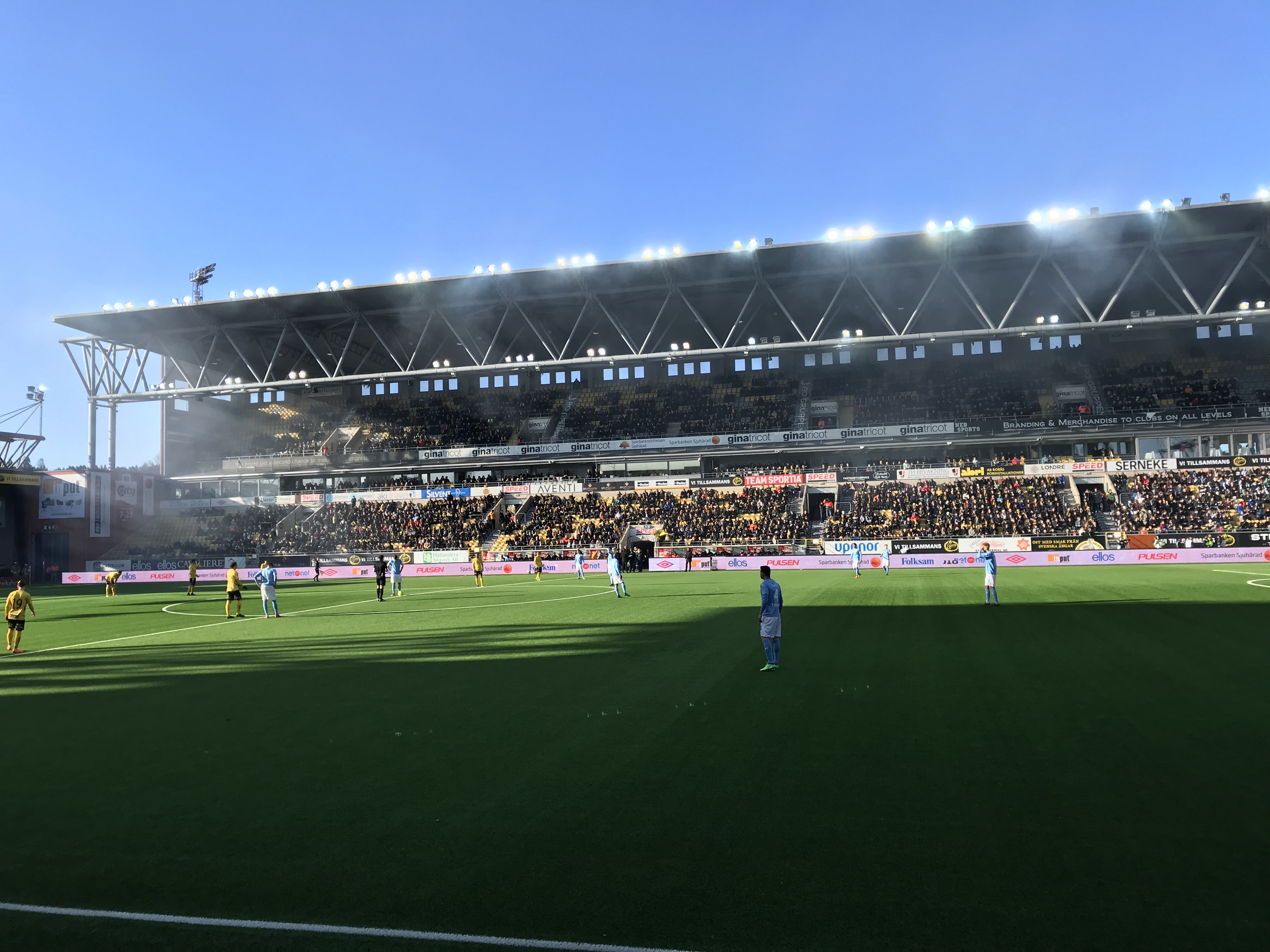
Malmö FF's Allsvenskan opener against IF Elfsborg.

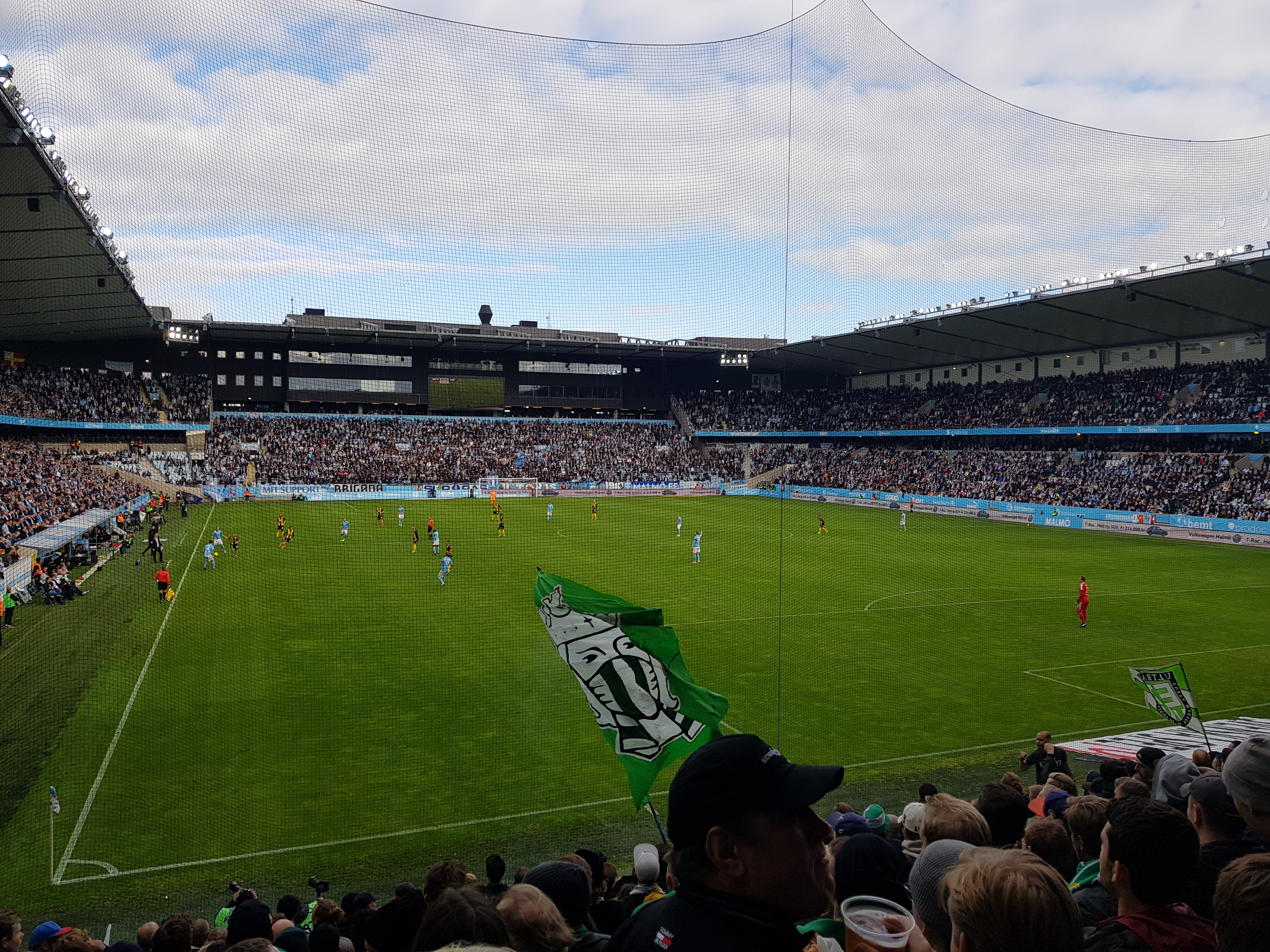
Malmö FF's home fixture against Hammarby on matchday 26.

=== Allsvenskan ===
After losing several key players during the off-season, many of whom to free transfers, Malmö FF went into the 2018 season with the expressed strategy of only partially replacing the players who were lost with new signings such as Fouad Bachirou, Arnór Ingvi Traustason and Søren Rieks, and filling the depth of the squad with players from the club's academy.

After an unbeaten pre-season and cup run Malmö FF started their season away to IF Elfsborg on 2 April. Teenage starlet Mattias Svanberg opened the club's season tally less than two minutes into the opener in a game Malmö FF ended up winning 2–1. A week later, MFF played their home opener against AIK, who were widely considered MFF's biggest challenger for the title. Despite conceding a penalty and a red card to Franz Brorsson, MFF were able to secure a point with AIK seemingly unwilling to take initiative in front of the sell-out crowd at Stadion.

Despite encouraging signs early in the season, the AIK match turned out to be the start of a historically bad run for Malmö FF, where they won only two of ten matches between 9 April and 16 May, including an embarrassing 3–0 loss in the final of the Swedish Cup. With the title seemingly out of reach only weeks into the season, Magnus Pehrsson was fired after the 1–0 loss to Trelleborgs FF on 13 May. With the club currently in eleventh place, Malmö FF CEO Niclas Carlnén expressibly revised the club's Allsvenskan target from winning the title to reaching a spot in the top three. Sporting director and former club captain Daniel Andersson stepped in as caretaker manager for the three games that remained before the World Cup break, but was unable to right the ship as the team took four points from those three games.

On 12 June Uwe Rösler was appointed head coach, while Andersson also announced several signings in an effort to move up the table and make a run for the upcoming Champions League qualifiers. The 2017 Allsvenskan MVP Anders Christiansen was reacquired from Gent, former club captain Guillermo Molins was brought in on a free transfer, former Allsvenskan top scorer Marcus Antonsson moved from Leeds, and Sundsvall's breakthrough player Romain Gall was added to the squad.

The changes proved effective and Malmö FF emerged as a new team for the second half of the season, with nine wins and one draw over the first ten Allsvenskan games after the World Cup break. A hectic schedule saw MFF eventually get into a five-game slump in which they only won one game, but the team was able to bounce back and finish league play with three straight wins to reach third place and secure a qualifying spot for the 2019–20 UEFA Europa League.

==== League table ====
Pos	Team	Pld	W	D	L	GF	GA	GD	Pts	Qualification or relegation
1	AIK (C)	30	19	10	1	50	16	+34	67	Qualification for the Champions League first qualifying round
2	IFK Norrköping	30	19	8	3	51	27	+24	65	Qualification for the Europa League first qualifying round
3	Malmö FF	30	17	7	6	57	29	+28	58	Qualification for the Europa League first qualifying round
4	Hammarby IF	30	17	7	6	56	35	+21	58	
5	BK Häcken	30	16	5	9	58	27	+31	53	Qualification for the Europa League second qualifying round (Note: BK Häcken qualified for the Europa League second qualifying round by winning the 2018–19 Svenska Cupen.)

Source: svenskfotboll.se (in Swedish)
Rules for classification: 1) Points; 2) Goal difference; 3) Goals scored; 4) Head-to-head points; 5) Head-to-head goal difference; 6) Head-to-head away goals scored; 7) Play-off
(Note: Play-off is only played if need to decide champion, teams for relegation or UEFA competition and will be played on a neutral ground).
(C) Champions

==== Results summary ====
Overall								Home						Away					
Pld	W	D	L	GF	GA	GD	Pts	W	D	L	GF	GA	GD	W	D	L	GF	GA	GD
30	17	7	6	57	29	+28	58	10	4	1	32	8	+24	7	3	5	25	21	+4

Source: svenskfotboll.se (in Swedish)

==== Results by round ====
Round	1	2	3	4	5	6	7	8	9	10	11	12	13	14	15	16	17	18	19	20	21	22	23	24	25	26	27	28	29	30
Ground	A	H	A	A	H	A	H	A	H	A	H	A	H	A	H	H	A	H	H	A	A	H	A	H	A	H	A	H	A	H
Result	W	D	D	L	W	L	L	L	W	L	D	W	D	W	W	W	W	W	W	W	W	W	L	D	D	W	D	W	W	W
Position	5	5	6	9	8	10	10	11	11	11	12	10	10	8	7	6	6	5	4	4	4	4	4	4	4	4	5	5	4	3

Source: see below
A = Away; H = Home; W = Win; D = Draw; L = Loss

==== Matches ====
2 April 2018 Matchday 1	IF Elfsborg	1–2	Malmö FF	Borås
17:30	Prodell 17'	Report	Svanberg 2'; Traustason 24'	Stadium: Borås Arena; Attendance: 11,615; Referee: Bojan Pandžić

9 April 2018 Matchday 2	Malmö FF	1–1	AIK	Malmö
19:00	Rosenberg 43' (pen.)	Report	Goitom 12'	Stadium: Stadion; Attendance: 20,072; Referee: Stefan Johannesson

13 April 2018 Matchday 3	GIF Sundsvall	2–2	Malmö FF	Sundsvall
19:00	76' (o.g.); Sema 87'	Report	Strandberg 77'; Jeremejeff 84'	Stadium: Idrottsparken; Attendance: 3,479; Referee: Patrik Eriksson

18 April 2018 Matchday 4	Djurgårdens IF	3–0	Malmö FF	Stockholm
19:00	Kadewere 46', 77'; Kozica 90+2'	Report		Stadium: Tele2 Arena; Attendance: 13,010; Referee: Mohammed Al-Hakim

23 April 2018 Matchday 5	Malmö FF	3–1	IF Brommapojkarna	Malmö
19:00	Rosenberg 40', 70'; Rieks 85'	Report	Ajeti 63' (pen.)	Stadium: Stadion; Attendance: 14,745; Referee: Magnus Lindgren

29 April 2018 Matchday 6	Kalmar FF	3–0	Malmö FF	Kalmar
17:30	Söderqvist 25'; Elm 33'; Hiago 45+1'	Report		Stadium: Guldfågeln Arena; Attendance: 7,047; Referee: Patrik Eriksson

3 May 2018 Matchday 16	Malmö FF	1–0	Djurgårdens IF	Malmö
19:00	Strandberg 59'	Report		Stadium: Stadion; Attendance: 15,728; Referee: Andreas Ekberg

7 May 2018 Matchday 7	Malmö FF	1–2	IFK Göteborg	Malmö
19:00	Strandberg 54'	Report	Wernersson 42'; Erlingmark 58'	Stadium: Stadion; Attendance: 17,715; Referee: Stefan Johannesson

13 May 2018 Matchday 8	Trelleborgs FF	1–0	Malmö FF	Trelleborg
17:30	Nielsen 90'	Report		Stadium: Vångavallen; Attendance: 7,043; Referee: Glenn Nyberg

16 May 2018 Matchday 10	Hammarby IF	3–2	Malmö FF	Stockholm
19:00	Đurđić 36', 65'; Dibba 70'	Report	Rieks 19'; Svanberg 46'	Stadium: Tele2 Arena; Attendance: 23,490; Referee: Martin Strömbergsson

20 May 2018 Matchday 9	Malmö FF	2–0	BK Häcken	Malmö
17:30	Rieks 49'; Rosenberg 78' (pen.)	Report		Stadium: Stadion; Attendance: 15,735; Referee: Mohammed Al-Hakim

27 May 2018 Matchday 11	Malmö FF	1–1	Dalkurd FF	Malmö
15:00	Strandberg 55'	Report	Awad 43'	Stadium: Stadion; Attendance: 14,099; Referee: Kristoffer Karlsson

7 July 2018 Matchday 12	IK Sirius	0–4	Malmö FF	Uppsala
13:00		Report	Rosenberg 15', 47'; Traustason 49'; Rieks 84'	Stadium: Studenternas IP; Attendance: 1,823; Referee: Stefan Johannesson

14 July 2018 Matchday 13	Malmö FF	1–1	Östersunds FK	Malmö
18:00	Rosenberg 33'	Report	Ghoddos 72'	Stadium: Stadion; Attendance: 13,211; Referee: Glenn Nyberg

21 July 2018 Matchday 14	Örebro SK	1–2	Malmö FF	Örebro
16:00	Rogić 69'	Report	Strandberg 48', 73'	Stadium: Behrn Arena; Attendance: 4,045; Referee: Andreas Ekberg

28 July 2018 Matchday 15	Malmö FF	2–1	IFK Norrköping	Malmö
18:00	Rosenberg 5' (pen.); Rieks 65'	Report	Skrabb 56'	Stadium: Stadion; Attendance: 15,731; Referee: Bojan Pandžić

10 August 2018 Matchday 17	Dalkurd FF	0–1	Malmö FF	Gävle
19:00		Report	Rieks 43'	Stadium: Gavlevallen; Attendance: 603; Referee: Robert Daradic

18 August 2018 Matchday 18	Malmö FF	3–0	Trelleborgs FF	Malmö
16:00	Andersson 2'; Vindheim 26'; Antonsson 35'	Report		Stadium: Stadion; Attendance: 14,073; Referee: Glenn Nyberg

26 August 2018 Matchday 19	Malmö FF	5–0	IK Sirius	Malmö
15:00	Rosenberg 62' (pen.); Gall 66', 72'; Christiansen 76'; Antonsson 88'	Report		Stadium: Stadion; Attendance: 11,237; Referee: Martin Strömbergsson

2 September 2018 Matchday 20	IF Brommapojkarna	0–3	Malmö FF	Stockholm
15:00		Report	Rieks 24'; Larsson 62'; Antonsson 63'	Stadium: Grimsta IP; Attendance: 1,635; Referee: Bojan Pandžić

15 September 2018 Matchday 21	Östersunds FK	2–3	Malmö FF	Östersund
18:00	Fritzson 9'; Aiesh 15'	Report	Rieks 36', 57'; Antonsson 39'	Stadium: Jämtkraft Arena; Attendance: 5,631; Referee: Johan Hamlin

23 September 2018 Matchday 22	Malmö FF	4–0	Kalmar FF	Malmö
17:30	Traustason 16', 42'; Gall 32'; Rosenberg 64'	Report		Stadium: Stadion; Attendance: 15,584; Referee: Magnus Lindgren

26 September 2018 Matchday 23	IFK Norrköping	3–1	Malmö FF	Norrköping
19:00	Holmberg 18', 31' (pen.); Dagerstål 90+2'	Report	Antonsson 28' (pen.)	Stadium: Nya Parken; Attendance: 11,160; Referee: Bojan Pandžić

30 September 2018 Matchday 24	Malmö FF	0–0	GIF Sundsvall	Malmö
17:30		Report		Stadium: Stadion; Attendance: 12,058; Referee: Victor Wolf

7 October 2018 Matchday 25	BK Häcken	1–1	Malmö FF	Gothenburg
15:00	Jeremejeff 71'	Report	Gall 47'	Stadium: Bravida Arena; Attendance: 5,004; Referee: Magnus Lindgren

20 October 2018 Matchday 26	Malmö FF	2–1	Hammarby IF	Malmö
13:00	Antonsson 47'; Rosenberg 57'	Report	Hamad 28' (pen.)	Stadium: Stadion; Attendance: 19,125; Referee: Kristoffer Karlsson

29 October 2018 Matchday 27	AIK	1–1	Malmö FF	Solna
19:00	Larsson 90+6'	Report	Christiansen 44'	Stadium: Friends Arena; Attendance: 31,160; Referee: Bojan Pandžić

1 November 2018 Matchday 28	Malmö FF	4–0	Örebro SK	Malmö
19:00	Antonsson 6'; Strandberg 28'; Gall 56'; Larsson 85'	Report		Stadium: Stadion; Attendance: 11,618; Referee: Patrik Eriksson

4 November 2018 Matchday 29	IFK Göteborg	0–3	Malmö FF	Gothenburg
15:00		Report	Gall 65'; Rieks 71'; Rosenberg 80' (pen.)	Stadium: Gamla Ullevi; Attendance: 13,073; Referee: Martin Strömbergsson

11 November 2018 Matchday 30	Malmö FF	2–0	IF Elfsborg	Malmö
15:00	Rosenberg 60'; Antonsson 78'	Report		Stadium: Stadion; Attendance: 13,091; Referee: Magnus Lindgren

=== Svenska Cupen ===
==== 2017–18 ====
The tournament continued from the 2017 season.

After beating FC Trollhättan in August 2017 to qualify for the group stage, Malmö FF was drawn into a group with Allsvenskan newcomers IF Brommapojkarna and Dalkurd FF and Superettan side Gefle IF. A late Markus Rosenberg penalty saw Malmö FF win their first game against Dalkurd. In the second contest Malmö FF traveled to Gefle for a game that was postponed four hours because of a snow storm, but when eventually played MFF won comfortably by a score of 3–0. The result set up a group final between two teams that won their first games, where Malmö FF managed to beat Brommapojkarna 3–1 to qualify for the quarter-final in which they beat rivals IFK Göteborg 1–0. In the semi-final the team traveled to Östersund where a late winner from Arnór Traustason sent Malmö FF to the cup final.

The location for the cup final was decided by a draw that took place at an Allsvenskan kick-off event, which awarded home field advantage to Djurgårdens IF. While the competition to this point had been played during the Allsvenskan pre-season, the final was scheduled for 10 May. During the two months that elapsed between the semi-final and final Malmö FF's Allsvenskan campaign had sent the club into a state of crisis, which reached new heights in the cup final where a lackluster performance handed the club a 3–0 defeat which fueled supporter turmoil in the MFF sections with play temporarily suspended in the final minutes.

Kickoff times are in UTC+1 unless stated otherwise.

===== Group stage =====
Pos	Team	Pld	W	D	L	GF	GA	GD	Pts	Qualification
1	Malmö FF	3	3	0	0	7	1	+6	9	Advance to Knockout stage
2	IF Brommapojkarna	3	2	0	1	5	3	+2	6	
3	Dalkurd FF	3	0	1	2	2	5	−3	1	
4	Gefle IF	3	0	1	2	2	7	−5	1	

Source: Swedish Football Association
Rules for classification: 1) Points; 2) Goal difference; 3) Goals scored; 4) Head-to-head record; 5) Highest ranked team

18 February 2018 Matchday 1	Malmö FF	1–0	Dalkurd FF	Malmö
17:00	Rosenberg 87' (pen.)	Report		Stadium: Malmö IP; Attendance: 4,566; Referee: Magnus Lindgren

25 February 2018 Matchday 2	Gefle IF	0–3	Malmö FF	Gävle
19:00		Report	Jeremejeff 18'; Bengtsson 24'; Strandberg 89'	Stadium: Gavlevallen; Attendance: 283; Referee: Glenn Nyberg

4 March 2018 Matchday 3	Malmö FF	3–1	IF Brommapojkarna	Malmö
17:00	Jeremejeff 32'; Strandberg 47'; Svanberg 65'	Report	Ajeti 60'	Stadium: Malmö IP; Attendance: 3,155; Referee: Kristoffer Karlsson

===== Knockout stage =====
10 March 2018 Quarter-final	Malmö FF	1–0	IFK Göteborg	Malmö
13:00	Nielsen 18'	Report		Stadium: Malmö IP; Attendance: 4,135; Referee: Glenn Nyberg

17 March 2018 Semi-final	Östersunds FK	0–1	Malmö FF	Östersund
18:15		Report	Traustason 79'	Stadium: Jämtkraft Arena; Attendance: 3,416; Referee: Mohammed Al-Hakim

10 May 2018 Final	Djurgårdens IF	3–0	Malmö FF	Stockholm
15:00 UTC+2	Une Larsson 17'; Mrabti 47'; Ring 81'	Report		Stadium: Tele2 Arena; Attendance: 25,123; Referee: Bojan Pandžić

==== 2018–19 ====
The tournament continued into the 2019 season.

Malmö FF entered the cup in the second round, where they were drawn against Division 1 club Lunds BK. The game was initially scheduled to be played on 23 August, but was postponed because of Malmö FF's Europa League schedule and eventually rescheduled for 22 November.

===== Qualification stage =====
22 November 2018 Round 2	Lunds BK	0–2	Malmö FF	Lund
19:00		Report	Rosenberg 56'; Molins 90+2'	Stadium: Klostergårdens IP; Attendance: 3,619; Referee: Kristoffer Karlsson

=== UEFA Champions League ===
==== Qualifying phase and play-off round ====
Kickoff times are in UTC+2 unless stated otherwise. After changes to the UEFA Champions League qualifying phase, Malmö FF entered in the first round for the first time in 2018. Malmö FF were seeded in the first round, and were drawn against the winners of a preliminary tournament involving the champions of the four lowest ranked associations. The winners ended up being Kosovan champions FC Drita. Since Drita's home stadium did not live up to the standards set by UEFA, the game was played at Adem Jashari Olympic Stadium in Mitrovica, and Malmö FF came away with a decisive 3–0 victory which was followed by 2–0 at home to advance to the second round.

In the second round Malmö FF were once again seeded, but faced a tough draw in Romanian champions CFR Cluj. The first game was played in Cluj-Napoca where Carlos Strandberg scored a crucial away goal in the final minute of the first half which ended up being the only goal of the game. Cluj equalized on aggregate 36 minutes into the return leg in Malmö, but a second-half, long-distance strike from Arnór Traustason sent MFF through to the third round.

The draw for the third round took place before the second round was finalized and the winners between Malmö FF and CFR Cluj were unseeded and drawn against the winners between Bulgarian champions Ludogorets Razgrad and Hungarian champions MOL Vidi FC. Against all odds Vidi ended up knocking out the Bulgarians and traveled to Malmö for the first game in the third round. Recently re-acquired Anders Christiansen opened the scoring an hour into the contest, but Vidi scored an equalizer ten minutes later after a defensive error that would end up as the decisive away goal when the return leg finished scoreless in Hungary.

===== First qualifying round =====
10 July 2018 First Leg	FC Drita	0–3	Malmö FF	Mitrovica
20:45		Report	Strandberg 13'; Traustason 39'; Rosenberg 82'	Stadium: Adem Jashari Olympic Stadium; Attendance: 9,780; Referee: Boris Marhefka

17 July 2018 Second Leg	Malmö FF	2–0 (5–0 agg.)	FC Drita	Malmö
19:00	Strandberg 55'; Larsson 60'	Report		Stadium: Stadion; Attendance: 10,623; Referee: Laurent Kopriwa

===== Second qualifying round =====
24 July 2018 First Leg	CFR Cluj	0–1	Malmö FF	Cluj-Napoca
19:00 UTC+3		Report	Strandberg 45'	Stadium: Stadionul Dr. Constantin Rădulescu; Attendance: 6,950; Referee: Nikola Dabanović

1 August 2018 Second Leg	Malmö FF	1–1 (2–1 agg.)	CFR Cluj	Malmö
19:15	Traustason 55'	Report	Djoković 36'	Stadium: Stadion; Attendance: 18,153; Referee: Andrew Dallas

===== Third qualifying round =====
7 August 2018 First Leg	Malmö FF	1–1	MOL Vidi	Malmö
19:15	Christiansen 62'	Report	Nego 71'	Stadium: Stadion; Attendance: 17,209; Referee: Matej Jug

14 August 2018 Second Leg	MOL Vidi	0–0 (a 1–1 agg.)	Malmö FF	Felcsút
20:00		Report		Stadium: Pancho Aréna; Attendance: 3,432; Referee: Xavier Estrada Fernández

=== UEFA Europa League ===
The tournament continued into the 2019 season.

==== Play-off round ====
After being knocked out by MOL Vidi FC in the third round of the Champions league qualifiers, Malmö FF entered the play-off round of the UEFA Europa League where they were seeded and drawn against Danish champions FC Midtjylland. After seemingly being in control of play and with a 2–0 lead an hour into the first game at home, MFF lost control the last half hour and ended up having to travel to Denmark with a tough a 2–2 result. In the return leg however, goals from Marcus Antonsson and Markus Rosenberg sent Malmö FF into the Europa League group stages.

Kickoff times are in UTC+2.

23 August 2018 First Leg	Malmö FF	2–2	FC Midtjylland	Malmö
19:15	Rosenberg 12'; Antonsson 25'	Report	Wikheim 60'; Okosun 77'	Stadium: Stadion; Attendance: 11,487; Referee: Srđan Jovanović

30 August 2018 Second Leg	FC Midtjylland	0–2 (2–4 agg.)	Malmö FF	Herning
19:15		Report	Antonsson 32'; Rosenberg 79'	Stadium: MCH Arena; Attendance: 9,175; Referee: Serdar Gözübüyük

==== Group stage ====
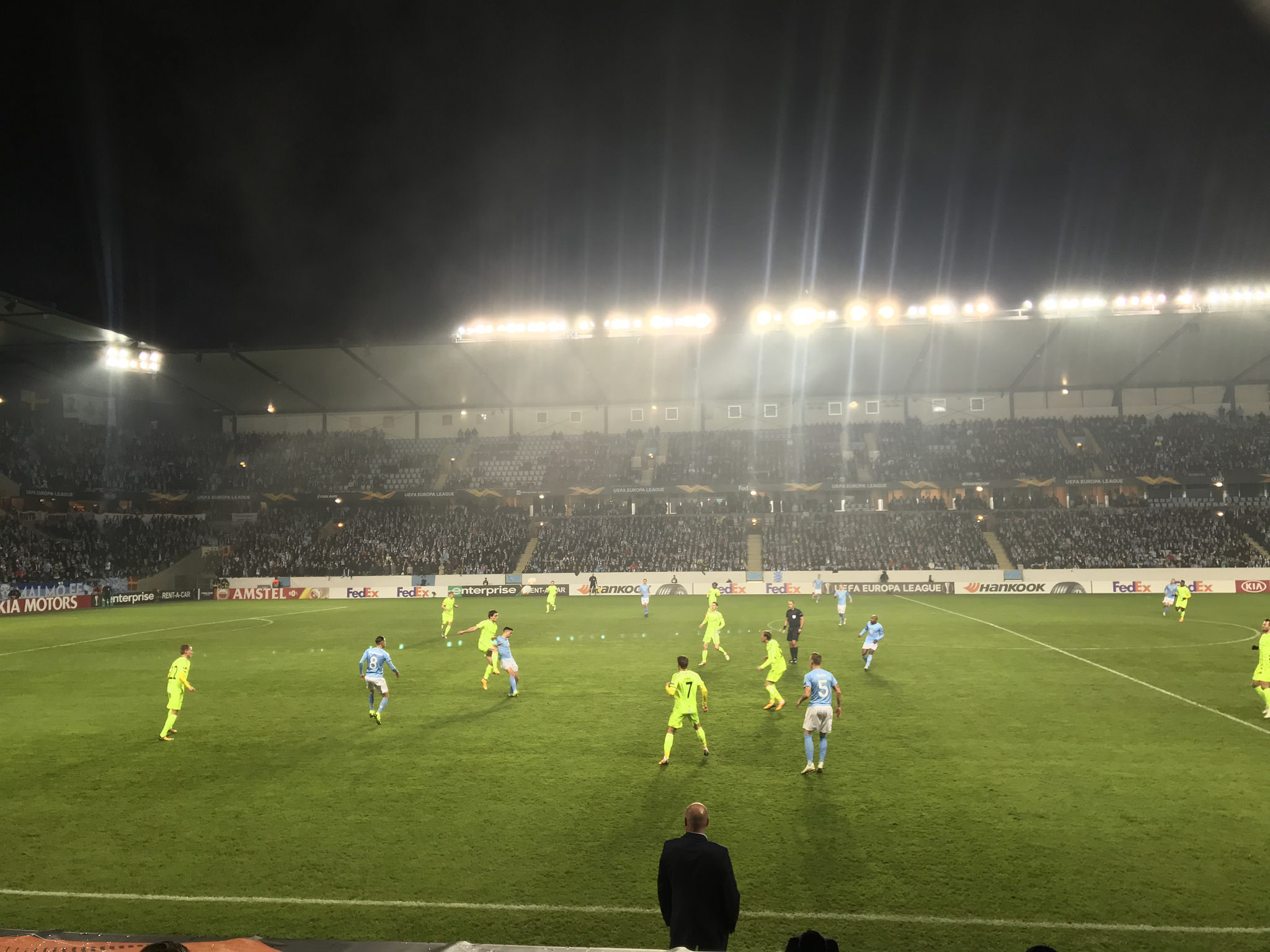
Malmö FF's home fixture against Sarpsborg 08.

Times up to 27 October 2018 (matchdays 1–3) are CEST (UTC+2), thereafter (matchdays 4–6) times are CET (UTC+1).

Pos	Team	Pld	W	D	L	GF	GA	GD	Pts	Qualification	GNK	MAL	BES	SRP
1	(Belgium) Genk	6	3	2	1	14	8	+6	11	Advance to knockout phase	—	2–0	1–1	4–0
2	(Sweden) Malmö FF	6	2	3	1	7	6	+1	9	Advance to knockout phase	2–2	—	2–0	1–1
3	(Turkey) Beşiktaş	6	2	1	3	9	11	−2	7		2–4	0–1	—	3–1
4	(Norway) Sarpsborg 08	6	1	2	3	8	13	−5	5		3–1	1–1	2–3	—

Source: UEFA
Rules for classification: Group stage tiebreakers

20 September 2018 Matchday 1	K.R.C. Genk	2–0	Malmö FF	Genk
18:55	Trossard 37'; Samatta 71'	Report		Stadium: Luminus Arena; Attendance: 11,590; Referee: Aleksei Eskov

4 October 2018 Matchday 2	Malmö FF	2–0	Beşiktaş J.K.	Malmö
21:00	53' (o.g.); Rosenberg 76' (pen.)	Report		Stadium: Stadion; Attendance: 17,174; Referee: Aleksandar Stavrev

25 October 2018 Matchday 3	Sarpsborg 08 FF	1–1	Malmö FF	Sarpsborg
21:00	Halvorsen 87'	Report	Vindheim 79'	Stadium: Sarpsborg Stadion; Attendance: 8,022; Referee: Paweł Raczkowski

8 November 2018 Matchday 4	Malmö FF	1–1	Sarpsborg 08 FF	Malmö
18:55	Antonsson 67'	Report	Mortensen 63'	Stadium: Stadion; Attendance: 17,601; Referee: Miroslav Zelinka

29 November 2018 Matchday 5	Malmö FF	2–2	K.R.C. Genk	Malmö
21:00	Lewicki 65'; Antonsson 67'	Report	Pozuelo 42'; Paintsil 53'	Stadium: Stadion; Attendance: 16,117; Referee: Srđan Jovanović

13 December 2018 Matchday 6	Beşiktaş J.K.	0–1	Malmö FF	Istanbul
18:55		Report	Antonsson 51'	Stadium: Vodafone Park; Attendance: 24,955; Referee: Luca Banti

== Non-competitive ==
=== Pre-season ===
Malmö FF kicked of its pre-season with two friendlies at Malmö IP before traveling to Bradenton, Florida for pre-season camp. In Florida, MFF played its final matches before the start of Svenska Cupen against two MLS teams. During the group stage of the cup, Malmö FF scheduled additional friendlies to give players who did not feature heavily in the competition pre-season minutes. The games were played on an artificial practice field near Stadion.

Kickoff times are in UTC+1 unless stated otherwise.

20 January 2018	Malmö FF	1–0	Fremad Amager	Malmö
13:00	Bergqvist 83'	Report		Stadium: Malmö IP; Attendance: 2,771

26 January 2018	Malmö FF	4–0	FC Flora	Malmö
18:30	6' (o.g.); Jeremejeff 8'; Strandberg 16'; Bergqvist 74'	Report		Stadium: Malmö IP; Attendance: 1,527

3 February 2018	New England Revolution	0–1	Malmö FF	Bradenton
14:30 UTC−5		Report	Strandberg 57'	Stadium: IMG Academy

8 February 2018	D.C. United	1–2	Malmö FF	Bradenton
14:30 UTC−5	Mattocks 56'	Report	Strandberg 85', 87'	Stadium: IMG Academy

27 February 2018	Malmö FF	2–2	FC Roskilde	Malmö
14:30	Hansson 20'; Brorsson 90+1'	Report	Lindberg 30'; Thygesen 40'	Stadium: Plan 9

6 March 2018	Malmö FF	2–2	FC Nordsjælland	Malmö
13:00	Rosenberg 32', 74'	Report	Sadiq 18'; 42' (o.g.)	Stadium: Plan 9

=== Mid-season ===
Kickoff times are in UTC+2 unless stated otherwise.

20 June 2018	Malmö FF	2–0	Molde FK	Malmö
11:00	Jeremejeff 52'; Ssewankambo 79'	Report		Stadium: Stadion; Attendance: 792

29 June 2018	FC Midtjylland	2–1	Malmö FF	Herning
15:00	Sanneh 51'; Sparv 73'	Report	Rosenberg 41' (pen.)	Stadium: Vildbjerg Sportcenter

3 July 2018	Malmö FF	3–1	Torns IF	Malmö
	Strandberg; Jeremejeff (pen.); Christiansen	Report	Podsiadly	Stadium: Stadion

25 November 2018	Malmö FF	4–1	Trelleborgs FF	Malmö
	Bengtsson; Antonsson	Report	Hörberg

5 December 2018	Real Balompédica Linense	0–1	Malmö FF	Marbella
12:30 UTC+1		Report	Rieks	Stadium: Estadio Municipal La Línea
