= Søren Rieks =

Danish footballer

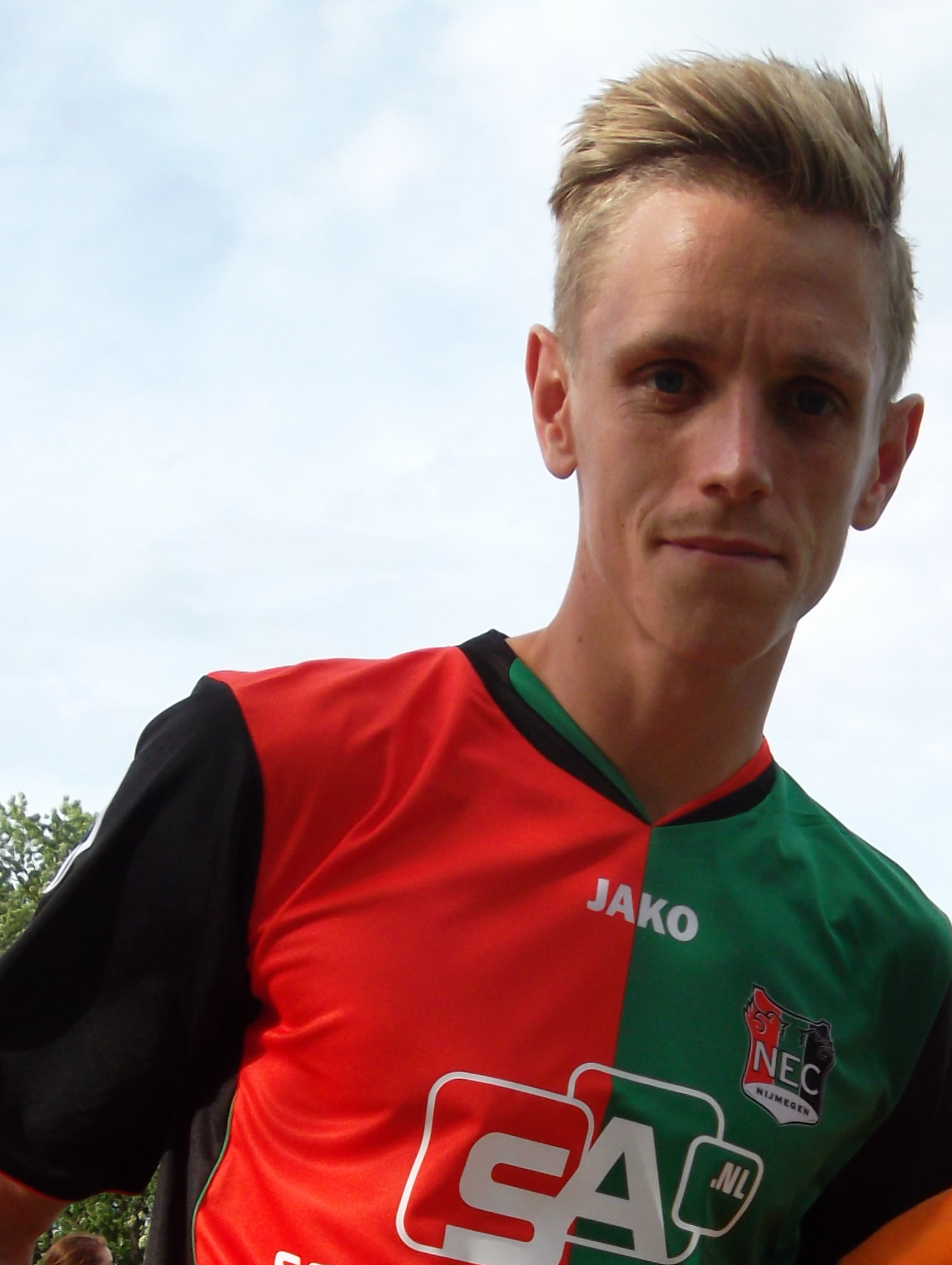
- Rieks in 2012 with NEC

Personal information
- Full name: Søren Krucov Rieks
- Date of birth: 7 April 1987 (age 39)
- Place of birth: Esbjerg, Denmark
- Height: 1.84 m (6 ft 0 in)
- Position: Winger

Youth career
- 1992–2005: Esbjerg fB

Senior career*
Years	Team	Apps	(Gls)
2006–2012	Esbjerg fB	150	(41)
2012–2014	NEC	56	(9)
2014–2017	IFK Göteborg	92	(21)
2018–2025	Malmö FF	159	(38)
Total		457	(109)

International career
2007–2008	Denmark U21	7	(1)
2009–2010	Denmark	3	(1)
- * Club domestic league appearances and goals

Søren Krucov Rieks (Danish pronunciation: [ˈsœːɐ̯n̩ ˈʁiːks]; born 7 April 1987) is a Danish former professional footballer who plays as a winger. During his career, he represented Esbjerg fB, NEC, IFK Göteborg, and Malmö FF. A full international between 2009 and 2010, he won three caps and scored one goal for the Denmark national team.

== Club career ==
=== Esbjerg fB ===
From 2005 till 2012 Rieks played at hometown club Esbjerg fB.

=== NEC ===
In July 2012 he signed a three-year contract at Dutch side NEC.

=== IFK Göteborg ===
On 10 August 2014, Rieks joined Swedish side IFK Göteborg on a three-and-a-half-year contract. Having scored 21 goals in 92 appearances, Rieks left the club upon contract expiry at the end of the 2017 season.

=== Malmö FF ===
On 12 January 2018, Rieks signed for reigning Swedish champions Malmö FF on a three-year contract. This marked a rare direct move between IFK Göteborg and Malmö FF, the two historically most successful Swedish clubs.

On 28 October 2024 as Rieks won his fourth league title with Malmö FF he announced his retirement after the end of the season.

== International career ==
Rieks was called up for the Denmark national team in March 2009 for the two games against Albania and Malta. This was his first call-up. He has been called up afterwards, and he had his international début against South Korea on 14 November 2009, and on 18 November 2009 he had his second international match, where he also scored his first international goal.

== Career statistics ==
=== Club ===
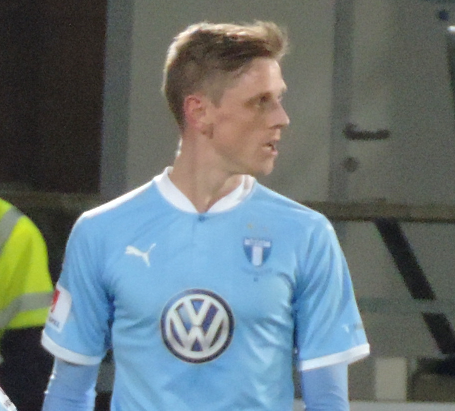
Rieks playing for Malmö FF in 2018.

As of As of 29 October 2024

Appearances and goals by club, season and competition
Club	Season	League			Cup		Continental		Total	
Club	Season	Division	Apps	Goals	Apps	Goals	Apps	Goals	Apps	Goals
Esbjerg fB	2005–06	Danish Superliga	1	0	0	0	—		1	0
Esbjerg fB	2006–07	Danish Superliga	11	0	0	0	—		11	0
Esbjerg fB	2007–08	Danish Superliga	27	7	0	0	—		27	7
Esbjerg fB	2008–09	Danish Superliga	28	5	1	2	—		29	7
Esbjerg fB	2009–10	Danish Superliga	30	6	2	0	—		32	6
Esbjerg fB	2010–11	Danish Superliga	27	6	2	0	—		29	6
Esbjerg fB	2011–12	Danish 1st Division	24	17	1	0	—		25	17
Esbjerg fB	2012–13	Danish Superliga	2	0	—		—		2	0
Esbjerg fB	Total		150	41	6	2	0	0	156	43
NEC	2012–13	Eredivisie	28	2	1	0	—		29	2
NEC	2013–14	Eredivisie	28	7	3	1	—		31	8
NEC	Total		56	9	4	1	0	0	60	10
IFK Göteborg	2014	Allsvenskan	12	2	0	0	—		12	2
IFK Göteborg	2015	Allsvenskan	28	10	6	2	4	0	38	12
IFK Göteborg	2016	Allsvenskan	22	4	4	4	8	1	34	9
IFK Göteborg	2017	Allsvenskan	30	5	4	4	—		34	9
IFK Göteborg	Total		92	21	14	10	12	1	118	32
Malmö FF	2018	Allsvenskan	26	10	7	0	14	0	47	10
Malmö FF	2019	Allsvenskan	27	9	2	0	14	1	43	10
Malmö FF	2020	Allsvenskan	25	5	4	1	5	2	34	8
Malmö FF	2021	Allsvenskan	18	6	1	0	11	2	30	8
Malmö FF	2022	Allsvenskan	15	2	5	0	5	0	25	2
Malmö FF	2023	Allsvenskan	28	3	2	1	—		30	4
Malmö FF	2024	Allsvenskan	18	4	3	1	6	1	27	6
Malmö FF	Total		157	39	24	4	55	6	236	48
Career total			455	110	48	16	67	7	570	133

=== International ===
As of 3 March 2010

Appearances and goals by national team and year
National team	Year	Apps	Goals
Denmark	2009	2	1
Denmark	2010	1	0
Total		3	1

Scores and results list Denmark's goal tally first, score column indicates score after each Rieks goal.

List of international goals scored by Søren Rieks
No.	Date	Venue	Opponent	Score	Result	Competition
1	18 November 2009	Atletion, Aarhus, Denmark	United States	2–1	3–1	Friendly

== Honours ==
Esbjerg fB

- Danish 1st Division: 2011–12

IFK Göteborg

- Svenska Cupen: 2014–15

Malmö FF

- Allsvenskan: 2020, 2021, 2023, 2024
- Svenska Cupen: 2021–22, 2023–24

Individual

- Esbjerg fB Player of the year: 2008–09, 2011–12
