= Hugo Andersson (footballer, born 1999) =

Swedish footballer (born 1999)

Personal information
- Full name: Per Emil Hugo Andersson
- Date of birth: 1999 (age 26–27)
- Place of birth: Skurup, Sweden
- Height: 1.96 m (6 ft 5 in)
- Position: Centre-back

Team information
- Current team: Värnamo
- Number: 6

Youth career
- –2010: Skurup
- 2011–2017: Malmö

Senior career*
Years	Team	Apps	(Gls)
2018–2021	Malmö	4	(1)
2019	→ Trelleborg (loan)	27	(0)
2020–2021	→ Hobro (loan)	31	(5)
2021	→ Värnamo (loan)	14	(0)
2022–2025	Randers	57	(4)
2025–	Värnamo	42	(4)

International career
2014–2016	Sweden U17	25	(1)
2016–2018	Sweden U19	12	(0)
2019	Sweden U21	4	(0)
- * Club domestic league appearances and goals as of 12 November 2026

Per Emil Hugo Andersson (born 1999) is a Swedish professional footballer who plays as a centre-back for Superettan club Värnamo.

== Career ==
=== Malmö FF ===
Andersson began playing football for hometown club Skurup's AIF. As a 12-year-old, he joined Malmö FF's youth academy. On 20 May 2018, Andersson made his Allsvenskan debut in a 2–0 win over BK Häcken, where he came on as a substitute in the 87th minute for Mattias Svanberg.

In February 2019, Andersson was sent on loan to Trelleborgs FF for the 2019 season. On 25 August 2020, it was confirmed, that Andersson had joined Danish Superliga club Hobro IK on a loan deal for the 2020–21 season. In August 2021, he was loaned out to the Superettan club IFK Värnamo on a six-month deal.

=== Randers ===
On 29 January 2022, Andersson signed a three-and-a-half-year contract with Danish Superliga club Randers.

=== Return to Värnamo ===
At the end of January 2025 it was confirmed, that Andersson had returned to IFK Värnamo on a deal until the end of 2027.

== Career statistics ==
As of match played 13 November 2022

Appearances and goals by club, season and competition
Club	Season	League			Cup		Continental		Total	
Club	Season	Division	Apps	Goals	Apps	Goals	Apps	Goals	Apps	Goals
Malmö FF	2018	Allsvenskan	4	1	2	0	0	0	6	1
Malmö FF	2019	Allsvenskan	0	0	0	0	0	0	0	0
Malmö FF	2020	Allsvenskan	0	0	0	0	0	0	0	0
Malmö FF	Total		4	1	2	0	0	0	6	1
Trelleborgs FF (loan)	2019	Superettan	27	0	0	0	—		27	1
Hobro (loan)	2020–21	Danish 1st Division	31	5	0	0	—		31	5
IFK Värnamo (loan)	2021	Superettan	14	0	1	0	—		15	0
Randers	2021–22	Danish Superliga	9	0	0	0	0	0	0	0
Randers	2022–23	Danish Superliga	15	3	1	0	—		16	3
Randers	Total		24	3	1	0	0	0	25	3
Career total			100	9	4	0	0	0	104	9
