= Egzon Binaku =

Albanian footballer

Personal information
- Date of birth: 27 August 1995 (age 31)
- Place of birth: Åmål, Sweden
- Height: 1.85 m (6 ft 1 in)
- Position: Left-back

Team information
- Current team: IF Viken

Youth career
- –2013: IFK Åmål
- 2014–2015: Häcken

Senior career*
Years	Team	Apps	(Gls)
2015–2017	Häcken	43	(1)
2016	→ Ljungskile (loan)	2	(1)
2018–2019	Malmö FF	18	(0)
2019–2022	IFK Norrköping	26	(0)
2023–2024	GAIS	20	(0)
2025–	IF Viken		

International career
2014	Sweden U19	1	(0)
2017	Sweden U21	2	(0)
2018	Albania	5	(0)
- * Club domestic league appearances and goals as of 13 November 2024

Egzon Binaku (born 27 August 1995) is a professional footballer who plays as a left-back for Swedish club IF Viken. Born in Sweden, he played for the Albania national team.

== Personal life ==
Binaku was born in Åmål, Sweden from Kosovo Albanian parents from the Kosovan town of Mitrovica.

== Club career ==
On 4 May 2015, he made his Allsvenskan debut for BK Häcken against Halmstads BK.

== International career ==
On 21 May 2018, Binaku received a call-up from Albania for the friendly matches against Kosovo and Ukraine.

== Career statistics ==
=== Club ===
As of 1 January 2020

Club	Season	League			Cup		Continental		Total	
Club	Season	Division	Apps	Goals	Apps	Goals	Apps	Goals	Apps	Goals
BK Häcken	2015	Allsvenskan	11	1	1	0	—		12	1
BK Häcken	2016	Allsvenskan	10	0	2	0	1	0	9	0
BK Häcken	2017	Allsvenskan	22	0	2	0	—		24	0
BK Häcken	Total		43	1	4	0	1	0	48	1
Ljungskile SK (loan)	2016	Superettan	1	1	1	0	—		2	1
Malmö FF	2018	Allsvenskan	18	0	4	0	2	0	24	0
Malmö FF	2019	Allsvenskan	0	0	1	0	0	0	1	0
Malmö FF	Total		18	0	5	0	2	0	25	0
IFK Norrköping	2019	Allsvenskan	6	0	2	0	0	0	8	0
IFK Norrköping	2020	Allsvenskan	8	0	1	0	0	0	9	0
IFK Norrköping	Total		14	0	3	0	0	0	17	0
Career total			76	2	13	0	3	0	92	2

== Honours ==
BK Häcken

- Svenska Cupen: 2015–16
