= Marcus Antonsson =

Swedish footballer (born 1991)

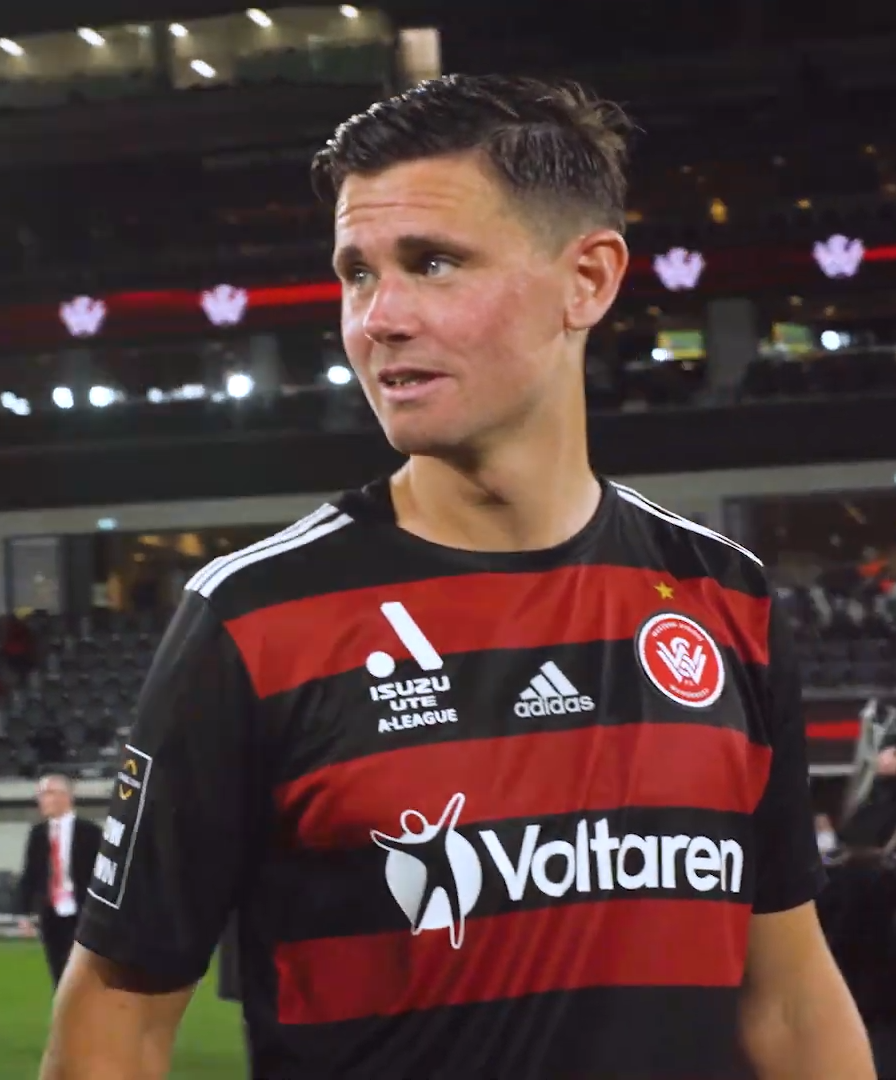
- Antonsson with Western Sydney Wanderers in 2023

Personal information
- Full name: Carl Marcus Christer Antonsson
- Date of birth: 8 May 1991 (age 35)
- Place of birth: Unnaryd, Sweden
- Height: 1.84 m (6 ft 0 in)
- Positions: Striker; left winger

Team information
- Current team: IFK Värnamo
- Number: 14

Youth career
- Unnaryds GoIF
- 2009–2010: Halmstads BK

Senior career*
Years	Team	Apps	(Gls)
2010–2014	Halmstads BK	71	(11)
2015–2016	Kalmar FF	41	(22)
2016–2018	Leeds United	16	(1)
2017–2018	→ Blackburn Rovers (loan)	31	(7)
2018–2021	Malmö FF	49	(15)
2020	→ Stabæk (loan)	10	(1)
2021	→ Halmstads BK (loan)	27	(6)
2022–2023	IFK Värnamo	30	(20)
2023	Al-Adalah	15	(6)
2023–2025	Western Sydney Wanderers	50	(12)
2025–	IFK Värnamo	43	(11)
- * Club domestic league appearances and goals as of 12 November 2026

Carl Marcus Christer Antonsson (born 8 May 1991) is a Swedish professional footballer who plays as a striker for Superettan club IFK Värnamo. He can also play as a forward or as a left winger.

He formerly played for English sides Leeds United and Blackburn Rovers.

== Club career ==
=== Halmstad ===
Antonsson started his youth career at Unnaryds GoIF before joining Halmstads BK in 2009, making his Allsvenskan debut for Halmstad on 7 November 2010 against Djurgårdens IF. He played 71 league games for Halmstads BK and scored 11 goals.

=== Kalmar ===
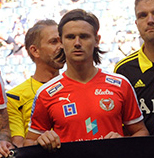
Antonsson pictured during his time at Kalmar FF.

Antonsson joined Kalmar FF in 2015. He scored 12 goals in 28 appearances in his first season at the club; his 12 goals saw him finish as the third top goalscorer in Allsvenskan. In February 2016, Antonsson extended his contract at Kalmar until 2018.

Antonsson scored 10 goals in his first 12 league games of the 2016–17 Swedish Allsvenskan season for Kalmar FF, making him the top scorer in the Allsvenskan at the time.

=== Leeds United ===
On 28 June 2016, Antonsson signed a three-year contract with English side Leeds United for an undisclosed fee. On 5 August, he was given the squad number 10 shirt for the 2016–17 season. On 7 August 2016, he made his competitive debut for the club as a second-half substitute in place of Matt Grimes, during a 3–0 defeat to Queens Park Rangers.

Antonsson scored his first goal for Leeds on 10 August in a League Cup fixture against Fleetwood Town. His second goal of the season, and his first in the league, came on 20 August in a 2–0 win against Sheffield Wednesday. On 26 October, he scored his third of the season for Leeds in their win against Norwich City in the English League Cup; a dramatic penalty shootout victory after a 2–2 draw in extra time.

==== Loan to Blackburn Rovers ====
On 11 August 2017, Blackburn Rovers announced the signing of Antonsson on loan for the season. On 9 September, he scored his first goal for Blackburn Rovers against Rochdale in a 0–3 victory. He went on to score another two goals in September. He found his position changed, being played as a left-sided forward or winger and in November he scored five goals in as many games, going on to win the PFA Player of the Month award for League One.

On 2 January 2018, it was revealed by manager Tony Mowbray that Antonsson had picked up an injury against Scunthorpe on 30 December, and would be ruled out for several weeks. He returned from injury on 19 February against Bury. On 24 April, he gained automatic promotion to the Championship with Blackburn after their 1–0 win against Doncaster Rovers.

==== Return to Leeds ====
After returning to Leeds, Antonsson was told he was not in the plans of new manager Marcelo Bielsa and held negotiations of a transfer to Italian Serie B Side Brescia, now owned by previous Leeds owner Massimo Cellino.

=== Malmö FF ===
On 14 July 2018, Antonsson joined Allsvenskan side Malmö FF on a three-year contract for an undisclosed fee from Leeds United after being signed by manager Uwe Rösler. He made his debut for the Swedish club on 21 July 2018, when he came on as a substitute in Malmö's 2–1 away league win over Örebro SK. He crowned a successful autumn with the winning goal at Beşiktaş away from home, as Malmö progressed to the knockout stages of the UEFA Europa League.

In March 2021, he signed for former club Halmstads BK on a season-long loan.

=== Värnamo ===
On 3 February 2022, Antonsson signed with Allsvenskan newcomer IFK Värnamo.

=== Al-Adalah ===
On 25 January 2023, Antonsson joined Saudi Arabian club Al-Adalah.

=== Western Sydney Wanderers ===
After 6 goals in 16 games for Al-Adalah, it was announced that Antonsson had signed for Australian A-League Men club Western Sydney Wanderers on a two-year contract.

== International career ==
Uncapped by Sweden, Antonsson was linked with a possible call up to the national side for Euro 2016 due to his form with Kalmar FF; however he was not called upon and missed out on the squad.

== Career statistics ==
As of match played 27 September 2020

Appearances and goals by club, season and competition
Club	Season	League			National cup (Note: Includes Svenska Cupen, FA Cup)		League cup (Note: Includes EFL Cup)		Continental		Other		Total	
Club	Season	Division	Apps	Goals	Apps	Goals	Apps	Goals	Apps	Goals	Apps	Goals	Apps	Goals
Halmstads BK	2010	Allsvenskan	1	0	0	0	—		—		—		1	0
Halmstads BK	2011	Allsvenskan	6	0	0	0	—		—		—		6	0
Halmstads BK	2012	Superettan	18	1	4	2	—		—		2 (Note: Appearances in the Allsvenskan/Superettan play-offs)	1	24	4
Halmstads BK	2013	Allsvenskan	20	2	4	1	—		—		2	0	26	3
Halmstads BK	2014	Allsvenskan	26	6	1	2	—		—		—		27	8
Halmstads BK	Total		71	9	9	5	—		—		4	1	84	15
Kalmar FF	2015	Allsvenskan	28	12	6	3	—		—		—		34	15
Kalmar FF	2016	Allsvenskan	12	10	0	0	—		—		—		12	10
Kalmar FF	Total		40	22	6	3	—		—		—		46	25
Leeds United	2016–17	Championship	16	1	2	0	3	2	—		—		21	3
Leeds United	2017–18	Championship	0	0	0	0	0	0	—		—		0	0
Leeds United	Total		16	1	2	0	3	2	—		—		21	3
Blackburn Rovers (loan)	2017–18	League One	31	7	2	1	1	0	—		—		34	8
Malmö FF	2018	Allsvenskan	15	8	1	0	—		12	5	—		28	13
Malmö FF	2019	Allsvenskan	26	6	4	3	—		11	1	—		41	10
Malmö FF	2020	Allsvenskan	8	1	5	2	—		2	0	—		15	3
Malmö FF	Total		49	15	10	5	—		25	6	—		84	26
Career total			207	54	29	14	4	2	25	6	4	1	269	77

== Honours ==
Blackburn Rovers

- EFL League One runner-up: 2017–18

Malmö FF

- Allsvenskan: 2020

Individual

- EFL League One Player of the Month: November 2017
