= Pavle Vagić =

Swedish footballer

Personal information
- Date of birth: 24 January 2000 (age 26)
- Place of birth: Malmö, Sweden
- Height: 1.88 m (6 ft 2 in)
- Positions: Centre-back; central midfielder

Team information
- Current team: Brommapojkarna

Youth career
- 2006–2017: Malmö FF

Senior career*
Years	Team	Apps	(Gls)
2017–2021	Malmö FF	10	(0)
2018	→ Jönköpings Södra IF (loan)	12	(1)
2019	→ Mjällby AIF (loan)	10	(2)
2019	→ AFC Eskilstuna (loan)	5	(1)
2020	→ Jönköpings Södra IF (loan)	17	(0)
2021–2022	Rosenborg	21	(0)
2021	→ Rosenborg 2	1	(0)
2022–2025	Hammarby IF	69	(0)
2023	→ Helsingborgs IF (loan)	7	(0)
2026	Liaoning Tieren	12	(0)
2026–	Brommapojkarna	0	(0)

International career^{‡}
2015–2017	Sweden U17	19	(6)
2017–2018	Sweden U19	8	(1)
2020–2022	Sweden U21	11	(0)
- * Club domestic league appearances and goals as of 14:00, 16 May 2026 (UTC) ‡ National team caps and goals as of 10:40, 11 June 2022 (UTC)

Pavle Vagić (born 24 January 2000) is a Swedish footballer who plays as a centre-back or central midfielder for Allsvenskan club Brommapojkarna.

== Early life ==
Vagić was born in Malmö, Sweden, to parents of Serbian descent. At age six, he began to play youth football with local club Malmö FF.

== Club career ==
=== Malmö FF ===
On 13 April 2017, Vagić was promoted to Malmö's first team together with Samuel Adrian, signing a three-year contract. On 29 October the same year, he made his debut for the club in Allsvenskan, coming on as a substitute in a 4–0 away win against IK Sirius.

On 10 August 2018, Vagić signed a new three-and-a-half-year contract with Malmö, while being sent on loan to Jönköpings Södra IF in Superettan for the remainder of the season.

On 8 January 2019, Vagić was sent on loan to Mjällby AIF in Superettan, together with Felix Konstandeliasz from Malmö. After putting on impressive performances for Mjällby, that eventually went on to win the 2019 Superettan, Vagić's stint at the club was cut short on 14 July. Instead, Malmö sent him on loan to AFC Eskilstuna in Allsvenskan for the remainder of the year.

Vagić began the 2020 season with Malmö, but failed to make any appearances for the club. On 2 July, he rejoined his former club Jönköpings Södra in Superettan on a six month-loan.

On 23 March 2021, Vagić signed a new contract with Malmö, running until the end of 2024. He made seven league appearances for the club in the 2021 Allsvenskan, that Malmö eventually went on to win, before leaving in August after falling out of favor with head coach Jon Dahl Tomasson.

=== Rosenborg ===
On 12 August 2021, Vagić transferred to Rosenborg BK in the Eliteserien, signing a contract until the end of 2025. The transfer fee was reportedly set at around 10 million SEK. Vagić made nine league appearances during the 2021 season, mainly as a centre-back, before being sidelined in November due to a knee ligament injury.

=== Hammarby IF ===
On 10 July 2022, Vagić transferred to Hammarby IF in Allsvenskan, signing a four-and-a-half-year contract. The transfer fee was reportedly set at around 7 million SEK.

=== Liaoning Tieren ===
On 13 January 2026, Vagić transferred to Chinese Super League club Liaoning Tieren.

=== Brommapojkarna ===
On 30 August 2026, Vagić returned to Sweden and joined Allsvenskan club Brommapojkarna.

== International career ==
Between 2015 and 2022, Vagić was capped for all Swedish youth teams from the under-17's to the under-21's, making 38 appearances for all selections.

On 10 June 2022, Vagić was called up to Sweden's 2022–23 UEFA Nations League away fixture against Norway. He remained on the bench for the whole game, that ended in a 3–2 loss for Sweden.

== Career statistics ==
As of match played 16 May 2026.

Appearances and goals by club, season and competition
Club	Season	League			Cup		Continental		Total	
Club	Season	Division	Apps	Goals	Apps	Goals	Apps	Goals	Apps	Goals
Malmö FF	2017	Allsvenskan	2	0	0	0	0	0	2	0
Malmö FF	2018	Allsvenskan	1	0	0	0	0	0	1	0
Malmö FF	2020	Allsvenskan	0	0	2	1	0	0	2	1
Malmö FF	2021	Allsvenskan	7	0	1	0	0	0	8	0
Malmö FF	Total		10	0	3	1	0	0	13	1
Jönköpings Södra(loan)	2018	Superettan	12	1	1	0	—		13	1
Mjällby (loan)	2018	Superettan	10	2	0	0	—		10	2
AFC Eskilstuna (loan)	2019	Allsvenskan	5	1	0	0	—		5	1
Jönköpings Södra (loan)	2020	Superettan	17	0	1	0	—		18	0
Rosenborg II	2021	Norwegian Second Division	1	0	0	0	—		1	0
Rosenborg BK	2021	Eliteserien	9	0	1	0	0	0	10	0
Rosenborg BK	2022	Eliteserien	11	0	1	0	—		12	0
Rosenborg BK	Total		21	0	2	0	0	0	23	0
Hammarby IF	2022	Allsvenskan	12	0	1	0	—		13	0
Hammarby IF	2023	Allsvenskan	9	0	3	0	0	0	12	0
Hammarby IF	2024	Allsvenskan	23	0	2	0	—		25	0
Hammarby IF	2025	Allsvenskan	25	0	4	0	2	0	31	0
Hammarby IF	Total		69	0	10	0	2	0	81	0
Helsingborgs IF (loan)	2023	Superettan	7	0	0	0	—		7	0
Liaoning Tieren	2026	Chinese Super League	11	0	0	0	—		11	0
Career total			162	4	17	1	2	0	181	5

== Honours ==
Malmö FF

- Allsvenskan: 2021
