= Felix Konstandeliasz =

Swedish footballer

Personal information
- Full name: Felix Patrik Andre Konstandeliasz
- Date of birth: 26 March 1999 (age 27)
- Height: 1.80 m (5 ft 11 in)
- Position: Midfielder

Youth career
- –2011: Dalby GIF
- 2012–2017: Malmö FF

Senior career*
Years	Team	Apps	(Gls)
2018–2019	Malmö FF	3	(0)
2019	→ Mjällby AIF (loan)	9	(0)
2020	Lunds BK	20	(1)
2021	Torns IF	25	(1)
2022	Lunds BK	9	(0)
2022	Lunds SK		

International career^{‡}
2016	Sweden U17	3	(0)
2016–2018	Sweden U19	5	(0)
- * Club domestic league appearances and goals as of 23 July 2022 ‡ National team caps and goals as of 18 April 2018

Felix Patrik Andre Konstandeliasz (born 26 March 1999) is a former Swedish footballer. He developed in the youth system of Malmö FF, and also made several youth international appearances for Sweden before rounding out his career with several clubs in and around the city of Lund.

== Club career ==
Konstandeliasz began his career with Dalby GIF, later moving to the academy of Malmö FF. Ahead of the 2018 season he was one of several youngsters promoted to the senior team. He made his Allsvenskan debut on 17 April 2018, coming on as a substitute against Djurgårdens IF. In 2019, he spent a season on loan in Superettan at Mjällby AIF as they were promoted to Allsvenskan.

Following his release from Malmö FF, Konstandeliasz played a few seasons for Lunds BK, Torns IF, and Lunds SK.

== Career statistics ==
As of 27 May 2018.

Club	Season	League		Cup		Continental		Total	
Club	Season	Apps	Goals	Apps	Goals	Apps	Goals	Apps	Goals
Malmö FF	2018	3	0	0	0	0	0	3	0
Malmö FF	Total	3	0	0	0	0	0	3	0
Career total		3	0	0	0	0	0	3	0
