= Samuel Adrian =

Swedish footballer (born 1998)

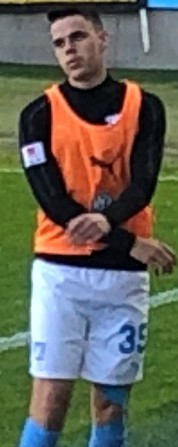

Personal information
- Date of birth: 2 March 1998 (age 28)
- Height: 1.83 m (6 ft 0 in)
- Position: Midfielder

Team information
- Current team: Ljungskile
- Number: 58

Youth career
- –2006: Blentarps BK
- 2006–2017: Malmö FF

Senior career*
Years	Team	Apps	(Gls)
2017–2022	Malmö FF	14	(0)
2019	→ Kalmar FF (loan)	4	(0)
2021	→ Falkenberg (loan)	26	(0)
2022	→ Jönköpings Södra (loan)	12	(1)
2023	Jönköpings Södra	28	(0)
2024–2025	Gefle	24	(1)
2026–	Ljungskile	9	(0)

International career^{‡}
2017–2018	Sweden U19	8	(0)
2019	Sweden U21	4	(0)
- * Club domestic league appearances and goals as of 12 November 2026 ‡ National team caps and goals as of 11 June 2019

Samuel Adrian (born 2 March 1998) is a Swedish footballer who plays as a midfielder for Superettan club Ljungskile.

== His career ==
Adrian's parent club is Blentarps BK. At the age of eight, he moved to Malmö FF. In April 2017, Adrian signed an apprenticeship contract with the first team until the 2018 season. Adrian made his Allsvenskan debut on 22 July 2017 in a 2–0 win over Jönköpings Södra IF, where he was substituted in the 84th minute for Kingsley Sarfo. On May 25, 2018, Adrian signed a first team contract with MFF until the 2020 season.

On July 18, 2019, Adrian was loaned to Kalmar FF. In August 2019, he suffered an ACL injury. In January 2021, Adrian was loaned to Falkenbergs FF on a loan agreement for the 2021 season. On August 7, 2022, Adrian was loaned to Jönköpings Södra on a loan agreement for the rest of the 2022 season.

On November 30, it was clear that Adrian will stay in Jsödra for two years.

In January 2024, Gefle IF announced the signing of Adrian.

== Career statistics ==
As of 30 August 2018.

Club	Season	League			Cup		Continental		Total	
Club	Season	Division	Apps	Goals	Apps	Goals	Apps	Goals	Apps	Goals
Malmö FF	2017	Allsvenskan	3	0	0	0	0	0	3	0
Malmö FF	2018	Allsvenskan	9	0	0	0	2	0	11	0
Malmö FF	Total		12	0	0	0	2	0	14	0
Career total			12	0	0	0	2	0	14	0
