= 2012 Malmö FF season =

Malmö FF
2012 season
- Chairman: Håkan Jeppsson
- Manager: Rikard Norling
- Stadium: Swedbank Stadion
- Allsvenskan: 3rd
- Top goalscorer: League: Mathias Ranégie (10); All: Mathias Ranégie (16)
- Highest home attendance: 23,638 (10 May vs. Helsingborgs IF)
- Lowest home attendance: 10,088 (27 August vs. IFK Norrköping)
- Average home league attendance: 14,799
Home colours	Away colours	Third colours

The 2012 season was Malmö FF's 101st in existence, their 77th season in Allsvenskan and their 12th consecutive season in the league. They competed in Allsvenskan where they finished in 3rd position. Malmö FF also participated in one competition in which the club continued playing in for the 2013 season, 2012–13 Svenska Cupen. The season was Rikard Norlings first full season as the club's manager as he joined the club halfway through the 2011 season. Ulrich Vinzents was appointed new club captain as the former captain, Daniel Andersson, announced that he would prioritise his coaching career as one of Malmö FF's three assistant managers. However, injury problems for the club's defender saw Andersson playing ten out of twelve league matches before the break for UEFA Euro 2012 and thus also holding the captaincy, Andersson continued to play sporadically after the summer break. Appointed captain Vinzents was injured in an early stage of the season and Miiko Albornoz was brought into the starting eleven, Albornoz held the position until the end of the season. Due to these circumstances third captain Jiloan Hamad held the captaincy for the majority of the matches throughout the season.

== Summary ==
=== Allsvenskan ===
The competitive league season started on 2 April when Malmö FF played against Gefle IF in a home fixture at Swedbank Stadion, the match ended in a draw 0–0. The spring season lasted until 24 May when Allsvenskan took a break due to the UEFA Euro 2012, Malmö's last match in the league before the break was the away fixture against GIF Sundsvall with resulted in a 1–1 draw. The league resumed play on 2 July when Malmö played at home against AIK where Malmö took and impressive 4–0 victory. The season then continued until early November with Malmö playing their last match of the season against AIK at Råsunda, this match was the last ever Allsvenskan fixture at the stadium before demolition, only two additional matches in the group stage of the 2012–13 UEFA Europa League remained for AIK to play at the stadium. The fixture AIK vs Malmö FF was also the very first match held at the stadium in 1937, the last fixture was officially requested from AIK.

Malmö FF struggled to score in the early stages of the season and didn't record a goal until 64th minute in the third league game of the season, home against Kalmar FF, this was also the club's first win for the season. The first away fixture for the season against BK Häcken was lost 5–0, the club's biggest loss in the league since the 2001 season. The team continued to play well at home, winning all five home games after the first fixture to the break for the UEFA Euro 2012 with a goal difference of 10–1. However, the team were clearly struggling away from home, in six away fixtures the team only managed to win the match against Djurgårdens IF after a late goal in the 88th minute. The remaining away fixtures before the UEFA Euro 2012 break resulted in three drawn and two lost matches, the away fixture goal difference at this time was 10–15. At the time of the break Malmö FF occupied second position in the league table, eight points behind leaders IF Elfsborg and one point ahead of third placed AIK, Mathias Ranégie was the club's best goalscorer with five goals in the league.

Malmö FF continued to win at home, winning the two first home matches after the break against AIK and GAIS. However, the team lost surprisingly away from home against the relegation threatened Örebro SK who had only won one match before this. Just after this set of matches Malmö started winning away from home when the team took two away wins in a row against GAIS and Gefle IF. When Malmö lost away against leaders Elfsborg with 4–1 and drew with Häcken at home in a goalless match Malmö dropped from second to third in the league table behind Häcken and Elfsborg with 9 matches left to play. The team continued to drop points in some important matches, specifically losing their first home game of the season against IFK Göteborg 2–1, this resulted in a drop in the table to fourth place. After this match Malmö improved and won four matches in a row to top the table for the first time with two matches left of the season. Malmö were level at points with Elfsborg and two points ahead of third placed Häcken. The last home game of the season at Swedbank Stadion against already relegated Örebro resulted in a 1–1 draw, Malmö now positioned second had to win their last game against AIK at the same time as Elfsborg lost points at home against Åtvidabergs FF. However, this proved to a difficult scenario as AIK took a comfortable lead after 33 minutes at the same time as Elfsborg were leading at home. AIK later increased their lead to 2–0 which became the final score. Åtvidaberg later equalised against Elfsborg for the match to end 1–1, however this was enough for Elfsborg to be crowned league champions. Malmö dropped down to a final third place as Häcken won their last game of the season away from home against Sundsvall 2–1. Mathias Ranégie became Malmö FF's best goalscorer of the season with 6 goals scored even though he was sold to Italian side Udinese on the last day of the summer transfer window.

=== Svenska Cupen ===
It was decided in late 2011 that the format of the cup was to be changed to the fall–spring format instead of the current calendar year format. On 6 August the round of the tournament was drawn with Malmö facing Sandvikens IF at Jernvallen in Sandviken, the match was played on 20 August 2012. Malmö were 3–1 down until the 76th minute of the match and looked to be heading out of the competition, one goal each from Mathias Ranégie (who had previously scored the opening goal after three minutes) and Tokelo Rantie took the match to extra time. Two additional goals from Rantie to complete his hat-trick and one goal from Wílton Figueiredo turned the game to Malmö's favour and the club eventually made it through with a final score of 6–3. Malmö went on to compete in the tournament's group stage in March 2013.

== Key events ==
- 27 October 2011: Goalkeeper Dejan Garača and forward Agon Mehmeti leaves the club on free transfer. Goalkeeper Robin Olsen joins the club on a three-year contract transferring from IFK Klagshamn.
- 9 December 2011: Midfielder Jeffrey Aubynn leaves the club on free transfer.
- 13 December 2011: Midfielder Erik Friberg joins the club on a three-year contract transferring from Seattle Sounders FC.
- 23 December 2011: Midfielder Simon Thern joins the club on a three-year contract transferring from Helsingborgs IF.
- 23 December 2011: Midfielder Omid Nazari leaves the club, transferring to Ängelholms FF.
- 12 January 2012: Defender Tobias Malm leaves the club on loan to Trelleborgs FF for the duration of the season.
- 31 January: Defender Ulrich Vinzents is named the new club captain.
- 20 February 2012: Goalkeeper Viktor Noring joins the club on loan until 20 August 2012, transferring from Trelleborgs FF.
- 13 June 2012: Goalkeeper Johan Dahlin signs a new two-and-a-half-year contract, keeping him at the club until the end of the 2014 season.
- 17 July 2012: Defender Filip Helander signs a new three-and-a-half-year contract, his first contract for the first team, keeping him at the club until the end of the 2015 season.
- 30 July 2012: Defender Matias Concha joins the club on a two-and-a-half-year contract, transferring from German club Bochum.
- 9 August 2012: Forward Tokelo Rantie joins the club on a one-and-a-half-year loan deal transferring from Stars of Africa Academy.
- 22 August 2012: Goalkeeper Zlatan Azinović joins the club on a half year contract, transferring from Trelleborgs FF.
- 31 August 2012: Forward Mathias Ranégie leaves the club, transferring to Udinese.
- 31 August 2012: Midfielder David Löfquist joins the club on loan until 31 December 2012, transferring from Parma.

== Players ==
=== Squad ===
Note: Flags indicate national team as defined under FIFA eligibility rules; some limited exceptions apply. Players may hold more than one non-FIFA nationality.

No.	Pos.	Nation	Player
2	DF	DEN	Ulrich Vinzents (captain)
3	DF	SWE	Jasmin Sudić
4	DF	SWE	Daniel Andersson
5	DF	SWE	Pontus Jansson
6	DF	FIN	Markus Halsti
7	FW	SWE	Daniel Larsson
8	MF	SWE	Erik Friberg
9	MF	BRA	Wílton Figueiredo
10	MF	SWE	Jiloan Hamad
11	MF	SWE	Simon Thern
13	FW	SWE	Mathias Ranégie
14	DF	SWE	Miiko Albornoz
15	DF	SWE	Filip Helander
17	MF	SWE	Ivo Pękalski
18	MF	SWE	Amin Nazari

No.	Pos.	Nation	Player
19	FW	SWE	Dardan Rexhepi
20	DF	BRA	Ricardinho
21	MF	SWE	Jimmy Durmaz
22	DF	SWE	Filip Stenström
23	DF	SWE	Matias Concha
24	MF	SWE	David Löfquist (on loan from Parma)
25	GK	DEN	Robin Olsen
27	GK	SWE	Johan Dahlin
28	FW	SWE	Alexander Nilsson
29	FW	RSA	Tokelo Rantie (on loan from Stars of Africa)
30	GK	SWE	Viktor Noring (on loan from Trelleborgs FF)
30	GK	SWE	Zlatan Azinović
31	MF	SWE	Simon Kroon
32	MF	SWE	Tobias Lewicki

=== Players in/out ===
==== In ====
No.	Pos.	Nat.	Name	Age	EU	Moving from	Type	Transfer window	Ends	Transfer fee	Source
22	DF	(Sweden)	Filip Stenström	20	EU	IF Limhamn Bunkeflo	Loan return	Winter	2013	N/A	lb07.se
30	GK	(Sweden)	Dejan Garača	20	EU	IF Limhamn Bunkeflo	Loan return	Winter	2011	N/A	lb07.se
25	GK	(Denmark)	Robin Olsen	21	EU	IFK Klagshamn	Transfer	Winter	2014	N/A	mff.se
8	MF	(Sweden)	Erik Friberg	25	EU	Seattle Sounders FC (United States)	Transfer	Winter	2014	N/A	mff.se
32	MF	(Sweden)	Tobias Lewicki	18	EU	Youth system	Promoted	Winter	2013	N/A	fotbolltransfers.com
11	MF	(Sweden)	Simon Thern	19	EU	Helsingborgs IF	Transfer	Winter	2014	N/A	mff.se
30	GK	(Sweden)	Viktor Noring	21	EU	Trelleborgs FF	Loan	Winter	2012	N/A	mff.se
23	DF	(Sweden)	Matias Concha	32	EU	VfL Bochum (Germany)	Transfer	Summer	2014	N/A	mff.se
29	FW	(South Africa)	Tokelo Rantie	21	Non-EU	Stars Of Africa Academy (South Africa)	Loan	Summer	2013	N/A	mff.se
30	GK	(Sweden)	Zlatan Azinović	24	EU	Trelleborgs FF	Transfer	Summer	2012	N/A	mff.se
24	MF	(Sweden)	David Löfquist	26	EU	Parma (Italy)	Loan	Summer	2012	N/A	mff.se

==== Out ====
No.	Pos.	Nat.	Name	Age	EU	Moving to	Type	Transfer window	Transfer fee	Source
24	FW	(Sweden)	Agon Mehmeti	22	EU	Palermo (Italy)	End of contract	Winter	Free	sydsvenskan.se
30	GK	(Sweden)	Dejan Garača	21	EU	Syrianska FC	End of contract	Winter	Free	mff.se
25	GK	(Czech Republic)	Dušan Melichárek	29	EU	Slovácko (Czech Republic)	End of contract	Winter	Free	fcslovacko.cz
5	MF	(Serbia)	Miljan Mutavdžić	25	Non-EU	Radnički 1923	End of contract	Winter	Free	sydsvenskan.se
16	DF	(Portugal)	Yago Fernández	23	EU	Girona (Spain)	End of contract	Winter	Free	sydsvenskan.se
11	MF	(Sweden)	Jeffrey Aubynn	34	EU	GAIS	End of contract	Winter	Free	mff.se
23	DF	(Sweden)	Tobias Malm	19	EU	Trelleborgs FF	Loan	Winter	N/A	trelleborgsff.se
32	MF	(Sweden)	Tobias Lewicki	19	EU	Youth system	Demoted	Summer	N/A	skanskan.se
—	MF	(Netherlands)	Rick Kruys	27	EU	Excelsior (Netherlands)	Transfer	Summer	N/A	sbvexcelsior.nl
21	MF	(Sweden)	Jimmy Durmaz	23	EU	Gençlerbirliği (Turkey)	Transfer	Summer	N/A	genclerbirligi.org.tr
30	GK	(Sweden)	Viktor Noring	21	EU	Trelleborgs FF	Loan return	Summer	N/A	mff.se
13	FW	(Sweden)	Mathias Ranégie	28	EU	Udinese (Italy)	Transfer	Summer	N/A	mff.se

=== Squad stats ===
Number	Position	Name	2012 Allsvenskan		2012–13 Svenska Cupen		Others		Total	
Number	Position	Name	Appearances	Goals	Appearances	Goals	Appearances	Goals	Appearances	Goals
2	DF	Ulrich Vinzents	8	0	0	0	7	0	15	0
3	DF	Jasmin Sudić	9	0	1	0	9	0	19	0
4	DF	Daniel Andersson	16	1	1	0	7	0	24	1
5	DF	Pontus Jansson	30	1	0	0	9	0	39	1
6	DF	Markus Halsti	13	1	0	0	8	0	21	1
7	FW	Daniel Larsson	30	4	1	0	10	4	41	8
8	MF	Erik Friberg	24	0	0	0	8	2	32	2
9	MF	Wílton Figueiredo	22	5	1	1	9	1	32	7
10	MF	Jiloan Hamad	30	6	1	0	9	0	40	6
11	MF	Simon Thern	28	3	1	0	11	1	40	4
13	FW	Mathias Ranégie	19	10	1	2	8	4	28	16
14	DF	Miiko Albornoz	27	3	1	0	9	0	37	3
15	DF	Filip Helander	12	0	0	0	9	0	21	0
17	MF	Ivo Pękalski	21	1	0	0	3	0	24	1
18	MF	Amin Nazari	1	0	0	0	7	0	8	0
19	FW	Dardan Rexhepi	13	0	1	0	9	1	23	1
20	DF	Ricardinho	28	2	1	0	11	0	40	2
21	MF	Jimmy Durmaz	15	6	0	0	9	2	24	8
22	DF	Filip Stenström	0	0	0	0	1	0	1	0
23	DF	Matias Concha	2	0	1	0	1	0	4	0
24	MF	David Löfquist	4	0	0	0	0	0	4	0
25	GK	Robin Olsen	1	0	1	0	2	0	4	0
27	GK	Johan Dahlin	29	0	0	0	10	0	39	0
28	FW	Alexander Nilsson	17	2	1	0	8	2	26	4
29	FW	Tokelo Rantie	11	3	1	3	1	0	13	6
30	GK	Viktor Noring	0	0	0	0	4	0	4	0
30	GK	Zlatan Azinović	0	0	0	0	0	0	0	0
31	MF	Simon Kroon	1	0	0	0	6	0	7	0
32	MF	Tobias Lewicki	1	0	0	0	6	0	7	0
—	FW	Dino Islamović	0	0	0	0	4	0	4	0
—	DF	Pa Konate	0	0	0	0	2	0	2	0
—	MF	Paweł Cibicki	0	0	0	0	2	0	2	0
—	MF	Egzon Sekiraça	0	0	0	0	1	0	1	0

=== Disciplinary record ===
N	Pos.	Nat.	Name	Yellow card	Second yellow card	Red card	Notes
2	DF	(Denmark)	Vinzents	1			
3	DF	(Sweden)	Sudić	1			
5	DF	(Sweden)	Jansson	2			
6	DF	(Finland)	Halsti	1		1	
8	MF	(Sweden)	Friberg	6			
9	MF	(Brazil)	Figueiredo	6			
10	MF	(Sweden)	Hamad	2			
11	MF	(Sweden)	Thern	1			
13	FW	(Sweden)	Ranégie	3			
14	MF	(Sweden)	Albornoz	5			
15	MF	(Sweden)	Helander	1			
17	MF	(Sweden)	Pękalski	2			
19	FW	(Sweden)	Rexhepi	1			
20	DF	(Brazil)	Ricardinho	6			
21	MF	(Sweden)	Durmaz	2			
27	GK	(Sweden)	Dahlin	3			
28	FW	(Sweden)	Nilsson	1			
29	FW	(South Africa)	Rantie	1			

Source: svenskfotboll.se
Only competitive matches
(yellow card) = Number of bookings; (second yellow card) = Number of sending offs after a second yellow card; (red card) = Number of sending offs by a direct red card.
Notes: Allsvenskan only

== Club ==
=== Coaching staff ===
Position	Staff
Head Coach First Team	(Sweden) Rikard Norling
Assistant Coach First Team	(Sweden) Jörgen Pettersson
Assistant Coach First Team	(Sweden) Daniel Andersson
Assistant Coach First Team and Fitness Coach	(England) Simon Hollyhead
First Team Coach / Head Coach U-21	(Sweden) Leif Engqvist
Head Coach Youth Academy	(Sweden) Mats Engqvist
Youth Talent Coach	(Sweden) Staffan Tapper
Goalkeeping Coach	(Sweden) Jonnie Fedel
Physiotherapist	(Sweden) Wilner Registre

Source: Malmö FF

=== Other information ===
Chairman	(Sweden) Håkan Jeppsson
Managing director	(Sweden) Per Nilsson
Ground (capacity and dimensions)	Swedbank Stadion (24,000 / 105x70 m)

Source: Malmö FF and Swedbank Stadion

== Competitions ==
=== Overall ===
Competition	Started round	Current position / round	Final position / round	First match	Last match
Allsvenskan	—	—	3rd	2 April 2012	4 November 2012

Source: Competitions

=== Allsvenskan ===
==== League table ====
Pos	Team	Pld	W	D	L	GF	GA	GD	Pts	Qualification or relegation
1	IF Elfsborg (C)	30	18	5	7	48	29	+19	59	Qualification to Champions League second qualifying round
2	BK Häcken	30	17	6	7	67	36	+31	57	Qualification to Europa League second qualifying round
3	Malmö FF	30	16	8	6	49	33	+16	56	Qualification to Europa League first qualifying round
4	AIK	30	15	10	5	41	27	+14	55	
5	IFK Norrköping	30	15	7	8	50	43	+7	52	

Source: svenskfotboll.se (in Swedish)
Rules for classification: 1) points; 2) goal difference; 3) number of goals scored.
(C) Champions

==== Results summary ====
Overall								Home						Away					
Pld	W	D	L	GF	GA	GD	Pts	W	D	L	GF	GA	GD	W	D	L	GF	GA	GD
30	16	8	6	49	33	+16	56	10	3	1	25	5	+20	6	5	5	24	28	−4

Source: svenskfotboll.se

==== Results by round ====
Round	1	2	3	4	5	6	7	8	9	10	11	12	13	14	15	16	17	18	19	20	21	22	23	24	25	26	27	28	29	30
Ground	H	A	H	A	H	A	A	H	H	A	H	A	H	A	H	A	A	H	A	H	H	A	A	H	A	H	A	H	H	A
Result	D	L	W	W	W	L	D	W	W	D	W	D	W	L	W	W	W	D	L	W	D	W	D	L	W	W	W	W	D	L
Position	10	14	9	6	2	4	6	4	5	3	2	2	2	2	2	2	2	2	2	2	3	3	3	4	4	3	2	1	2	3

Source: see below
A = Away; H = Home; W = Win; D = Draw; L = Loss

==== Matches ====
Kickoff times are in UTC+2.

2 April 2012 Round 1	Malmö FF	0–0	Gefle IF	Malmö
19:00		Report		Stadium: Swedbank Stadion; Attendance: 17,102; Referee: Tobias Mattsson (Karlstad)

7 April 2012 Round 2	BK Häcken	5–0	Malmö FF	Gothenburg
14:00	Anklev 5'; Waris 24', 49'; Makondele 43', 84' (pen.)	Report		Stadium: Rambergsvallen; Attendance: 4,108; Referee: Michael Lerjéus (Skövde)

13 April 2012 Round 3	Malmö FF	2–0	Kalmar FF	Malmö
19:00	Larsson 64'; Durmaz 69'	Report		Stadium: Swedbank Stadion; Attendance: 12,533; Referee: Stefan Johannesson (Stocksund)

16 April 2012 Round 4	Djurgårdens IF	2–3	Malmö FF	Stockholm
19:00	Keene 54'; Hämäläinen 64'	Report	Figueiredo 13'; Hamad 33'; Ranégie 88'	Stadium: Stockholms Stadion; Attendance: 9,582; Referee: Martin Hansson (Holmsjö)

23 April 2012 Round 5	Malmö FF	2–0	Syrianska FC	Malmö
19:00	Figueiredo 20'; Durmaz 90'	Report		Stadium: Swedbank Stadion; Attendance: 11,640; Referee: Martin Strömbergsson (Gävle)

30 April 2012 Round 6	IFK Norrköping	3–2	Malmö FF	Norrköping
17:30	Þorvaldsson 21', 80'; Frempong 89'	Report	Durmaz 52'; Hamad 90'	Stadium: Idrottsparken; Attendance: 8,079; Referee: Michael Lerjéus (Skövde)

3 May 2012 Round 7	Mjällby AIF	2–2	Malmö FF	Hällevik
19:00	Fejzullahu 59', 83'	Report	Durmaz 8'; Hamad 20'	Stadium: Strandvallen; Attendance: 6,295; Referee: Daniel Stålhammar (Landskrona)

6 May 2012 Round 8	Malmö FF	2–1	Åtvidabergs FF	Malmö
17:30	Ranégie 67', 90+2'	Report	Möller 88'	Stadium: Swedbank Stadion; Attendance: 14,112; Referee: Johan Hamlin (Bro)

10 May 2012 Round 11	Malmö FF	3–0	Helsingborgs IF	Malmö
19:00	Larsson 14'; Pękalski 21'; Ranégie 26'	Report		Stadium: Swedbank Stadion; Attendance: 23,638; Referee: Jonas Eriksson (Sigtuna)

14 May 2012 Round 9	IFK Göteborg	2–2	Malmö FF	Gothenburg
19:00	Söder 31'; Dyrestam 78'	Report	Thern 44'; Nilsson 90+2'	Stadium: Gamla Ullevi; Attendance: 12,549; Referee: Stefan Johannesson (Stocksund)

17 May 2012 Round 10	Malmö FF	1–0	IF Elfsborg	Malmö
17:30	Ranégie 62'	Report		Stadium: Swedbank Stadion; Attendance: 17,243; Referee: Martin Hansson (Holmsjö)

24 May 2012 Round 12	GIF Sundsvall	1–1	Malmö FF	Sundsvall
19:00	Eklund 58'	Report	Nilsson 17'	Stadium: Norrporten Arena; Attendance: 5,210; Referee: Bojan Pandzic (Gothenburg)

2 July 2012 Round 13	Malmö FF	4–0	AIK	Malmö
19:00	Figueiredo 15', 42'; Durmaz 29', 40'	Report		Stadium: Swedbank Stadion; Attendance: 14,583; Referee: Martin Hansson (Holmsjö)

9 July 2012 Round 14	Örebro SK	2–1	Malmö FF	Örebro
19:00	Lumbana 54'; Berisha 65'	Report	Hamad 47'	Stadium: Behrn Arena; Attendance: 7,156; Referee: Markus Strömbergsson (Gävle)

16 July 2012 Round 15	Malmö FF	2–0	GAIS	Malmö
19:00	Larsson 23'; Ranégie 31'	Report		Stadium: Swedbank Stadion; Attendance: 13,023; Referee: Stefan Johannesson (Stocksund)

23 July 2012 Round 16	GAIS	2–3	Malmö FF	Gothenburg
19:00	Tornblad 14'; Johansson 34'	Report	Ranégie 29'; Andersson 47' (pen.); Jansson 68'	Stadium: Gamla Ullevi; Attendance: 5,045; Referee: Markus Strömbergsson (Gävle)

28 July 2012 Round 17	Gefle IF	0–2	Malmö FF	Gävle
16:00		Report	Ranégie 33', 38' (pen.)	Stadium: Strömvallen; Attendance: 4,150; Referee: Bojan Pandzic (Gothenburg)

5 August 2012 Round 18	Malmö FF	0–0	BK Häcken	Malmö
16:00		Report		Stadium: Swedbank Stadion; Attendance: 14,848; Referee: Daniel Stålhammar (Landskrona)

12 August 2012 Round 19	IF Elfsborg	4–1	Malmö FF	Borås
17:30	Larsson 31'; Elm 70'; Hult 75'; Mobaeck 87'	Report	Ranégie 57'	Stadium: Borås Arena; Attendance: 12,922; Referee: Jonas Eriksson (Sigtuna)

27 August 2012 Round 20	Malmö FF	2–0	GIF Sundsvall	Malmö
19:00	Albornoz 87'; Rantie 89'	Report		Stadium: Swedbank Stadion; Attendance: 11,534; Referee: Bojan Pandzic (Gothenburg)

1 September 2012 Round 21	Malmö FF	1–1	Mjällby AIF	Malmö
16:00	Rantie 13'	Report	Ericsson 53'	Stadium: Swedbank Stadion; Attendance: 13,486; Referee: Stefan Johannesson (Stocksund)

17 September 2012 Round 22	Åtvidabergs FF	0–1	Malmö FF	Åtvidaberg
19:00		Report	Ricardinho 72' (pen.)	Stadium: Kopparvallen; Attendance: 4,637; Referee: Michael Lerjeus (Skövde)

24 September 2012 Round 23	Helsingborgs IF	1–1	Malmö FF	Helsingborg
20:45	Uronen 56'	Report	Figueiredo 85'	Stadium: Olympia; Attendance: 14,191; Referee: Stefan Johannesson (Täby)

27 September 2012 Round 24	Malmö FF	1–2	IFK Göteborg	Malmö
20:05	Rantie 1'	Report	Hysén 68'; Stiller 87'	Stadium: Swedbank Stadion; Attendance: 15,109; Referee: Martin Strömbergsson (Gävle)

1 October 2012 Round 25	Syrianska FC	0–2	Malmö FF	Södertälje
19:00		Report	42' (o.g.); Thern 51'	Stadium: Södertälje Fotbollsarena; Attendance: 1,901; Referee: Stefan Johannesson (Täby)

5 October 2012 Round 26	Malmö FF	2–0	IFK Norrköping	Malmö
19:00	Hamad 61'; Albornoz 82' (pen.)	Report		Stadium: Swedbank Stadion; Attendance: 10,088; Referee: Martin Hansson (Holmsjö)

21 October 2012 Round 27	Kalmar FF	1–2	Malmö FF	Kalmar
15:00	Israelsson 76'	Report	Ricardinho 15'; Larsson 22'	Stadium: Guldfågeln Arena; Attendance: 6,676; Referee: Markus Strömbergsson (Gävle)

26 October 2012 Round 28	Malmö FF	3–1	Djurgårdens IF	Malmö
19:00	Thern 22'; Halsti 54'; Hamad 56'	Report	Nymann 26'	Stadium: Swedbank Stadion; Attendance: 15,107; Referee: Stefan Johannesson (Täby)

1 November 2012 Round 29	Malmö FF	1–1	Örebro SK	Malmö
20:05	Albornoz 57'	Report	Kamara 70'	Stadium: Swedbank Stadion; Attendance: 17,935; Referee: Martin Hansson (Holmsjö)

4 November 2012 Round 30	AIK	2–0	Malmö FF	Solna
15:00	Bangura 33'; Lundberg 62'	Report		Stadium: Råsunda; Attendance: 28,057; Referee: Jonas Eriksson (Stockholm)

=== Svenska Cupen ===
==== 2012–13 ====
The tournament continued into the 2013 season.

Kickoff times are in UTC+2.

20 August 2012 Round 2	Sandvikens IF	3–6 (a.e.t.)	Malmö FF	Sandviken
19:00	Vigren 43'; Sipuri 55'; Berglund 60'	Report	Ranégie 3', 87'; Rantie 76', 110', 117'; Figueiredo 116'	Stadium: Jernvallen; Attendance: 2,700; Referee: Markus Strömbergsson (Gävle)

== Non competitive ==
=== Pre-season ===
2 February 2012 Friendly	Malmö FF (Sweden)	1–1	(United States) D.C. United	Bradenton, Florida, United States
10:30 (UTC-5)	Friberg 15'	Report	Richter 55'	Stadium: IMG Academy

8 February 2012 Friendly	Malmö FF (Sweden)	2–1	(United States) Columbus Crew	Bradenton, Florida, United States
10:30 (UTC-5)	Ranégie 24'; Durmaz 29'	Report	Rentería 1'	Stadium: IMG Academy

17 February 2012 Friendly	Mjällby AIF	0–2	Malmö FF	Asarum, Sweden
15:00 (UTC+1)		Report	Larsson; Durmaz	Stadium: Asarums IP; Referee: Kristoffer Karlsson (Gothenburg)

24 February 2012 Friendly	Malmö FF (Sweden)	1–2	(Denmark) OB	Malmö, Sweden
14:00 (UTC+1)	76' (o.g.)	Report	Andreasen 36', 39'	Stadium: Malmö IP; Attendance: 1,620; Referee: Andreas Ekberg (Lund)

6 March 2012 Friendly	Celtic (Scotland)	0–0	(Sweden) Malmö FF	Lennoxtown, Scotland
11:30 (UTC±0)		Report		Stadium: Lennoxtown training centre

10 March 2012 Friendly	Malmö FF (Sweden)	1–0	(Norway) Viking FK	Lomma, Sweden
15:30 (UTC+1)	Larsson 37'	Report		Stadium: Lomma IP; Referee: Daniel Stålhammar (Landskrona)

16 March 2012 Friendly	IF Elfsborg	2–3	Malmö FF	Borås, Sweden
17:00 (UTC+1)	Ishizaki 80' (pen.); Larsson 90'	Report	Thern 7'; Ranégie 60', 85'	Stadium: Borås Arena; Attendance: 1,347; Referee: Kristoffer Karlsson (Gothenburg)

24 March 2012 Friendly	Malmö FF	4–2	BK Häcken	Malmö, Sweden
15:00 (UTC+1)	Larsson 13'; Figueiredo 31'; Nilsson 51'; Söderberg 63' (o.g.)	Report	Waris 60'; Söderberg 80'	Stadium: Swedbank Stadion; Attendance: 2,853; Referee: Andreas Ekberg (Lund)

=== Mid-season ===
17 June 2012 Friendly	Shamrock Rovers (Republic of Ireland)	1–2	(Sweden) Malmö FF	Dublin, Republic of Ireland
15:00 (UTC+1)	Twigg 5'	Report	Larsson 4'; Friberg 81'	Stadium: Tallaght Stadium

25 June 2012 Friendly	Malmö FF	1–1	Kalmar FF	Malmö, Sweden
18:00 (UTC+2)	Ranégie 84'		Andersson 57'	Stadium: Swedbank Stadion

19 July 2012 Friendly	Malmö FF (Sweden)	1–0	(England) West Bromwich Albion	Malmö, Sweden
19:00 (UTC+2)	Nilsson 8'	Report		Stadium: Swedbank Stadion; Attendance: 3,128; Referee: Martin Hansson (Holmsjö)

16 August 2012 Friendly	Lazio (Italy)	2–1	(Sweden) Malmö FF	Rome, Italy
21:00 (UTC+2)	Hernanes 38' (pen.); Kozák 90+3'	Report	Rexhepi 80'	Stadium: Stadio Olimpico; Referee: Gianpaolo Calvarese (Teramo)
