= 2011 Malmö FF season =

Malmö FF
2011 season
- Chairman: Håkan Jeppsson
- Manager: Roland Nilsson (until 29 May); Rikard Norling (from 3 June)
- Stadium: Swedbank Stadion
- Allsvenskan: 4th
- Svenska Cupen: Quarter-finals
- Svenska Supercupen: Runners-up
- UEFA Champions League: Play-off round
- UEFA Europa League: Group stage
- Top goalscorer: League: Daniel Larsson (6); All: Daniel Larsson (13)
- Highest home attendance: 23,612 (24 May vs Helsingborgs IF, Allsvenskan)
- Lowest home attendance: 6,715 (17 October vs Syrianska FC, Allsvenskan)
- Average home league attendance: 12,388 (Allsvenskan only)
Home colours	Away colours	Third colours

The 2011 season was Malmö FF's 100th in existence, their 76th season in Allsvenskan and their 11th consecutive season in the league. They competed in Allsvenskan, where they finished in 4th position, Svenska Cupen, where they were knocked out in the quarter-finals, Svenska Supercupen, where they finished as runners-up, the UEFA Champions League, where they were knocked out in the play-off round and finally the UEFA Europa League, where they were knocked out in the group stage. Malmö FF were the reigning champions of Allsvenskan and also returned to European cup play after a five-year absence. Manager Roland Nilsson left the club on 29 May to become the new manager for F.C. Copenhagen, he was replaced by Rikard Norling who officially became the new Malmö FF manager on 3 June.

== Summary ==
=== Supercupen ===
The competitive season started on 19 March with Supercupen at Swedbank Stadion against Helsingborgs IF. Malmö FF had qualified for Supercupen by winning Allsvenskan the previous year while Helsingborg qualified by winning Svenska Cupen. The match ended 2–1 in Helsingborgs favour. This was the first time Malmö FF appeared in the competition after its introduction in 2007.

=== Svenska Cupen ===
Malmö FF entered their second cup play of the season on 11 May with round 3 of Svenska Cupen against Superettan club Jönköpings Södra IF at Stadsparksvallen, a match Malmö FF won 4–0. The club progressed another round by beating Halmstads BK 3–0 at Örjans Vall before being knocked out of Svenska Cupen in the quarter-finals on penalties by Kalmar FF at Guldfågeln Arena. The result was the best since the 2002 season when the club reached the semi-finals, despite this the result was disappointing since the club had set out to win the cup.

=== UEFA Champions League ===
The club entered European cup play on 13 July when they won their home fixture at Swedbank Stadion against HB Tórshavn with 2–0 in the first tier of the second qualifying round of the UEFA Champions League. The away fixture at Gundadalur ended as a draw with 1–1 as Malmö FF progressed to the next qualifying round. Malmö FF were drawn against Rangers F.C. in the third qualifying round and won the first leg 1–0, away at Ibrox. The home fixture at Swedbank Stadion ended as a draw with 1–1 and the club progressed to the play-off round with an aggregate score of 2–1. The club were drawn against Dinamo Zagreb in the play-off round, the first leg of the tie was played at Stadion Maksimir on 17 August and ended 4–1 in Dinamos favour. The second leg was played at Swedbank Stadion on 23 August, the club won the match 2–0, missing out to advance to the group stage by the away goals rule by one goal. Dinamo Zagreb won with an aggregate score of 4–3 and progressed to the group stage of the UEFA Champions League.

=== UEFA Europa League ===
Due to being eliminated in the play-off round of the UEFA Champions League, Malmö FF received a place in the group stage of the UEFA Europa League. The group stage was drawn on 26 August 2011. Malmö FF were seeded in the fourth and lowest seeding group and joined AZ, Metalist Kharkiv and Austria Vienna in Group G. This was the first time the club participated in the competition since its re branding and the first time the club participated in the group stage for an official UEFA competition. Malmö FF played their first match on 15 September away against AZ and lost 4–1. The club then played two consecutive home fixtures against: Austria Vienna, where they lost 2–1 and against Metalist Kharkiv, where they lost 4–1. Malmö FF then travelled to Ukraine to play Metalist Kharkiv away and lost 3–1. The clubs first and only point in the competition would come against AZ at home, a goalless fixture, however the club needed a win to still have the chance to proceed in the competition and were therefore knocked out. Malmö FF's last match in the competition was the away fixture against Austria Vienna who themselves still had a slight chance to proceed. The match ended 2–0 in Austria Vienna's favour, however, this was not enough for Austria Vienna and they found themselves knocked out of the competition along with Malmö FF while Metalist Kharkiv and AZ proceeded to the round of 32.

=== Allsvenskan ===
League play started on 3 April with the away fixture against Trelleborgs FF ironically played at Trelleborgs reserve stadium Swedbank Stadion due to their own Vångavallen being in an unplayable state, Malmö FF won the game 4–2. The club went on to win the next three games as well to mark their best league start in 60 years. As the season progressed the club started to drop in the table and found themselves in the middle of the table after 15 rounds, having only won three additional matches after the first four record breaking wins. The beginning of the season was shaped by the spectator scandal that occurred in the home game against rivals Helsingborgs IF when the game was suspended and Helisngborg being awarded a 3–0 win after an incident report. The club also had to appoint a new manager after Roland Nilsson announced his transfer to FC Copenhagen, Rikard Norling succeeded Nilsson on 3 June. The second part of the season started with three consecutive draws as the club was struggling to score on the chances that were created. The 23 July derby against Helsingborg away ended in a 2–2 draw. The club only lost one match in the second part of the season, away against Gefle IF 0–2, other than that the club played well and finished the league season with five consecutive wins. Malmö FF finished fourth in Allsvenskan and were thus given bronze medals for their performance.

== Key events ==
- 25 November 2010: It is confirmed that midfielder Muamet Asanovski will not play for the club for the 2011 season.
- 1 December 2010: Midfielder Jeffrey Aubynn signs a new one-year contract, keeping him at the club until the end of the 2011 season.
- 8 December 2010: Defender Yago Fernández signs a new one-year contract, keeping him at the club until the end of the 2011 season. Defender Tobias Malm signs a four-year first team contract joining from the youth team. At the same time it is confirmed that defender Joseph Elanga will not play for the club for the 2011 season.
- 26 January 2011: Midfielder Rick Kruys is loaned to FC Volendam until May 2011.
- 25 March 2011: Goalkeeper Dejan Garača is loaned to IF Limhamn Bunkeflo for the entire season. The agreement between the clubs allows for the player to return to Malmö FF on a 24-hour basis if necessary.
- 8 April 2011: Midfielder Jiloan Hamad signs a new two-year contract, keeping him at the club until the end of the 2013 season.
- 4 May 2011: Midfielder Amin Nazari signs a two and a half year first team contract joining from the youth team.
- 24 May 2011: Defender Jasmin Sudić signs a new 3-year contract, keeping him at the club until the end of the 2014 season.
  Defender Filip Stenström is loaned to IF Limhamn Bunkeflo for the entire season. The agreement between the clubs allows for the player to return to Malmö FF on a 24-hour basis if necessary.
- 25 May 2011: The club presents Rikard Norling as the new head coach after it has become clear that current manager Roland Nilsson is leaving the club to take over FC Copenhagen.
- 17 June 2011: Midfielder Guillermo Molins leaves the club for Belgian club Anderlecht.
- 22 June 2011: Defender Ulrich Vinzents signs a new one-year contract, keeping him at the club until the end of the 2012 season.
- 19 July 2011: Midfielder Rick Kruys is loaned to FC Volendam for the rest of the season.
- 14 August 2011: Defender Miiko Albornoz joins the club on a four-year contract transferring from IF Brommapojkarna.
- 30 August 2011: Striker Mathias Ranégie joins the club on a three-year contract transferring from BK Häcken.
- 29 September 2011: Defender Ricardinho signs a new three-year contract, keeping him at the club until the end of the 2014 season.

== Players ==
=== Squad ===
Note: Flags indicate national team as defined under FIFA eligibility rules; some limited exceptions apply. Players may hold more than one non-FIFA nationality.

No.	Pos.	Nation	Player
2	DF	DEN	Ulrich Vinzents
3	DF	SWE	Jasmin Sudić
4	DF	SWE	Daniel Andersson (captain)
5	MF	SRB	Miljan Mutavdžić
6	DF	FIN	Markus Halsti
7	FW	SWE	Daniel Larsson
9	MF	BRA	Wílton Figueiredo
10	MF	SWE	Jiloan Hamad
11	MF	SWE	Jeffrey Aubynn
13	FW	SWE	Mathias Ranégie
14	MF	SWE	Guillermo Molins
14	DF	SWE	Miiko Albornoz
15	DF	SWE	Pontus Jansson
16	DF	POR	Yago Fernández

No.	Pos.	Nation	Player
17	MF	SWE	Ivo Pękalski
18	MF	SWE	Amin Nazari
19	FW	SWE	Dardan Rexhepi
20	DF	BRA	Ricardinho
21	MF	SWE	Jimmy Durmaz
22	DF	SWE	Filip Stenström
23	DF	SWE	Tobias Malm
24	FW	SWE	Agon Mehmeti
25	GK	CZE	Dušan Melichárek
26	MF	SWE	Simon Kroon
27	GK	SWE	Johan Dahlin
28	FW	SWE	Alexander Nilsson
30	GK	SWE	Dejan Garača
33	DF	SWE	Filip Helander

=== Players in/out ===
==== In ====
No.	Pos.	Nat.	Name	Age	EU	Moving from	Type	Transfer window	Ends	Transfer fee	Source
23	DF	(Sweden)	Tobias Malm	18	EU	Youth system	Promoted	Winter	2014	N/A	mff.se
18	MF	(Sweden)	Amin Nazari	18	EU	Youth system	Promoted	Between	2013	N/A	mff.se
14	DF	(Sweden)	Miiko Albornoz	20	EU	IF Brommapojkarna	Transfer	Summer	2015	Unknown	mff.se
13	FW	(Sweden)	Mathias Ranégie	27	EU	BK Häcken	Transfer	Summer	2014	Unknown	mff.se
26	MF	(Sweden)	Simon Kroon	18	EU	Youth system	Promoted	Between	2013	N/A	fotbolltransfers.com
33	DF	(Sweden)	Filip Helander	18	EU	Youth system	Promoted	Between	2013	N/A	fotbolltransfers.com

==== Out ====
No.	Pos.	Nat.	Name	Age	EU	Moving to	Type	Transfer window	Transfer fee	Source
–	DF	(Sweden)	Anes Mravac	21	EU	IF Limhamn Bunkeflo	Transfer	Winter	Free	lb07.se
36	MF	(Sweden)	Muamet Asanovski	19	EU	AB (Denmark)	End of contract	Winter	Free	sydsvenskan.se
4	DF	(Cameroon)	Joseph Elanga	31	Non-EU	Free agent	End of contract	Winter	Free	mff.se
10	MF	(Netherlands)	Rick Kruys	25	EU	Volendam (Netherlands)	Loan	Winter	N/A	mff.se
30	GK	(Sweden)	Dejan Garača	19	EU	IF Limhamn Bunkeflo	Loan	Winter	N/A	mff.se
22	DF	(Sweden)	Filip Stenström	20	EU	IF Limhamn Bunkeflo	Loan	Between	N/A	lb07.se
14	MF	(Sweden)	Guillermo Molins	22	EU	Anderlecht (Belgium)	Transfer	Summer	Unknown	mff.se

=== Squad stats ===
No.	Pos	Nat	Player	Total		Allsvenskan		Svenska Cupen		Europe		Other	
No.	Pos	Nat	Player	Apps	Goals	Apps	Goals	Apps	Goals	Apps	Goals	Apps	Goals
2	DF	(Denmark) DEN	Ulrich Vinzents	45	1	23	0	3	1	8	0	11	0
4	DF	(Sweden) SWE	Daniel Andersson	48	1	25	0	3	1	11	0	9	0
5	MF	(Serbia) SRB	Miljan Mutavdžić	42	2	22	1	3	1	9	0	8	0
6	DF	(Finland) FIN	Markus Halsti	35	1	16	1	3	0	8	0	8	0
7	FW	(Sweden) SWE	Daniel Larsson	51	13	27	6	3	2	12	2	9	3
9	MF	(Brazil) BRA	Wilton Figueiredo	45	9	24	5	2	0	11	2	8	2
10	MF	(Sweden) SWE	Jiloan Hamad	43	8	20	3	1	1	11	2	11	2
11	MF	(Sweden) SWE	Jeffrey Aubynn	43	1	22	1	2	0	8	0	11	0
13	FW	(Sweden) SWE	Mathias Ranégie	14	6	7	3	0	0	6	2	1	1
14	MF	(Sweden) SWE	Guillermo Molins	18	5	9	3	2	1	0	0	7	1
14	DF	(Sweden) SWE	Miiko Albornoz	10	0	6	0	0	0	2	0	2	0
15	DF	(Sweden) SWE	Pontus Jansson	35	3	15	2	2	0	11	1	7	0
16	DF	(Portugal) POR	Yago Fernández	23	1	13	1	0	0	1	0	9	0
17	MF	(Sweden) SWE	Ivo Pekalski	33	2	19	2	0	0	10	0	4	0
18	MF	(Sweden) SWE	Amin Nazari	13	1	7	0	3	1	1	0	2	0
19	FW	(Sweden) SWE	Dardan Rexhepi	40	2	23	1	3	0	7	1	7	0
20	DF	(Brazil) BRA	Ricardinho	53	1	30	0	3	0	10	0	10	1
21	MF	(Sweden) SWE	Jimmy Durmaz	53	8	27	4	3	0	12	0	11	4
22	DF	(Sweden) SWE	Filip Stenström	9	0	3	0	0	0	1	0	5	0
23	DF	(Sweden) SWE	Tobias Malm	13	1	6	0	1	0	2	0	4	1
24	FW	(Sweden) SWE	Agon Mehmeti	41	5	21	4	1	0	11	1	8	0
25	GK	(Czech Republic) CZE	Dusan Melichárek	32	0	18	0	2	0	6	0	6	0
26	MF	(Sweden) SWE	Simon Kroon	11	0	8	0	0	0	0	0	3	0
27	GK	(Sweden) SWE	Johan Dahlin	25	0	12	0	0	0	6	0	7	0
28	FW	(Sweden) SWE	Alexander Nilsson	12	2	4	0	0	0	2	0	6	2
29	MF	(Sweden) SWE	Omid Nazari	8	0	4	0	0	0	1	0	3	0
30	GK	(Sweden) SWE	Dejan Garača	3	0	1	0	1	0	0	0	1	0
33	DF	(Sweden) SWE	Filip Helander	3	0	1	0	0	0	0	0	2	0
—	FW	(Sweden) SWE	Dino Islamović	3	0	0	0	0	0	0	0	3	0
—	DF	(Sweden) SWE	Alexander Blomqvist	1	0	0	0	0	0	0	0	1	0
—	DF	(Sweden) SWE	Jetmir Useinosvski	1	0	0	0	0	0	0	0	1	0
—	MF	(Sweden) SWE	Kristoffer Jeppsson	2	0	0	0	0	0	0	0	2	0
—	DF	(Sweden) SWE	Pa Konate	1	0	0	0	0	0	0	0	1	0
—	MF	(Sweden) SWE	Tobias Lewicki	2	0	0	0	0	0	0	0	2	0
—	MF	(Sweden) SWE	Hicham Ali	1	1	0	0	0	0	0	0	1	1
—	FW	(Sweden) SWE	Erik Pärsson	1	0	0	0	0	0	0	0	1	0
—	MF	(Sweden) SWE	Nikola Zivanovic	1	0	0	0	0	0	0	0	1	0
—	DF	(Sweden) SWE	Emil Borg	1	0	0	0	0	0	0	0	1	0

=== Disciplinary record ===
N	Pos.	Nat.	Name	Yellow card	Second yellow card	Red card	Notes
2	DF	(Denmark)	Vinzents	4			
4	DF	(Sweden)	Andersson	1		1	
5	MF	(Serbia)	Mutavdžić	5			
6	DF	(Finland)	Halsti	6			
7	FW	(Sweden)	Larsson	1			
9	MF	(Brazil)	Figueiredo	6	1		
10	MF	(Sweden)	Hamad	3			
11	MF	(Sweden)	Aubynn	3			
14	MF	(Sweden)	Molins	2			
15	DF	(Sweden)	Jansson	3			
16	DF	(Portugal)	Yago	3	1		
17	DF	(Sweden)	Pękalski	4	1		
19	FW	(Sweden)	Rexhepi	3		1	
21	MF	(Sweden)	Durmaz	8			
22	DF	(Sweden)	Stenström	1			
24	FW	(Sweden)	Mehmeti	3			
26	MF	(Sweden)	Kroon	1			
29	MF	(Sweden)	O.Nazari	1			

Source: mff.se
Only competitive matches
(yellow card) = Number of bookings; (second yellow card) = Number of sending offs after a second yellow card; (red card) = Number of sending offs by a direct red card.
Notes: Allsvenskan only

== Club ==
=== Coaching staff ===
Position	Staff
Head Coach First Team	(Sweden) Rikard Norling
Assistant Coach First Team	(Sweden) Anders Palmér
First Team Coach / Head Coach U-21	(Sweden) Leif Engqvist
Head Coach Youth Academy	(Sweden) Mats Engqvist
Youth Talent Coach	(Sweden) Staffan Tapper
Goalkeeping Coach	(Sweden) Jonnie Fedel
Fitness Coach	(England) Simon Hollyhead
Physiotherapist	(Sweden) Wilner Registre

Source: Malmö FF

=== Other information ===
Chairman	(Sweden) Håkan Jeppsson
Managing director	(Sweden) Per Nilsson
Ground (capacity and dimensions)	Swedbank Stadion (24,000 / 105x68 m)

Source: Malmö FF and Swedbank Stadion

== Competitions ==
=== Overall ===
Competition	Started round	Current position / round	Final position / round	First match	Last match
Allsvenskan	—	—	4th	3 April 2011	23 October 2011
Svenska Cupen	Round 3	—	Quarter-finals	11 May 2011	15 June 2011
Supercupen	Final	—	Runner-up	19 March 2011	
UEFA Champions League	Second qualifying round	—	Play-off round	13 July 2011	23 August 2011
UEFA Europa League	Group stage	—	Group stage	15 September 2011	15 December 2011

Source: Competitions

=== Allsvenskan ===
==== League table ====
Pos	Team	Pld	W	D	L	GF	GA	GD	Pts	Qualification or relegation
2	AIK	30	18	4	8	46	27	+19	58	Qualification to Europa League second qualifying round (Note: AIK qualified for the second qualifying round of the UEFA Europa League as they received the qualifying spot reserved for the winner of 2011 Svenska Cupen, as cup winner Helsingborg were already qualified to the UEFA Champions League through winning Allsvenskan. Kalmar FF, Svenska Cupen runners-up 2011, qualified for the first qualifying round of the UEFA Europa League.)
3	IF Elfsborg	30	18	3	9	52	32	+20	57	Qualification to Europa League first qualifying round
4	Malmö FF	30	15	9	6	37	30	+7	54	
5	GAIS	30	16	3	11	47	34	+13	51	
6	BK Häcken	30	14	7	9	52	32	+20	49	

Source: svenskfotboll.se (in Swedish)
Rules for classification: 1) points; 2) goal difference; 3) number of goals scored.

==== Results summary ====
Overall								Home						Away					
Pld	W	D	L	GF	GA	GD	Pts	W	D	L	GF	GA	GD	W	D	L	GF	GA	GD
30	15	9	6	37	30	+7	54	10	3	2	19	12	+7	5	6	4	18	18	0

Source: svenskfotboll.se

==== Results by round ====
Note: Since some matches were postponed, the "position" field has been corrected in hindsight.

Round	1	2	3	4	5	6	7	8	9	10	11	12	13	14	15	16	17	18	19	20	21	22	23	24	25	26	27	28	29	30
Ground	A	H	A	H	A	H	A	H	A	H	A	H	H	A	H	A	A	A	H	H	A	A	H	A	H	A	H	H	H	A
Result	W	W	W	W	L	L	D	W	D	L	L	W	D	L	W	D	D	D	W	W	L	D	D	W	D	W	W	W	W	W
Position	1	1	1	1	3	3	4	3	2	4	8	7	5	7	6	8	6	6	5	5	6	6	5	5	6	5	6	5	4	4

Source: see below
A = Away; H = Home; W = Win; D = Draw; L = Loss

==== Matches ====
Kickoff times are in CEST.

3 April 2011 Round 1	Trelleborgs FF	2–4	Malmö FF	Malmö
16.30	Andersson 30'; Haynes 63'	(Report)	Figueiredo 8'; Larsson 24', 52' (pen.); Mehmeti 56'	Stadium: Swedbank Stadion (HR)*; Attendance: 9,572; Referee: Markus Strömbergsson (Gävle) *(Replacement stadium for Trelleborgs FF since Vångavallen, Trelleborg was deemed not playable for the match by the Swedish Football Association.)

11 April 2011 Round 2	Malmö FF	3–1	Halmstads BK	Malmö
19.00	Mehmeti 59'; Aubynn 62'; Mutavdžić 84'	(Report)	Sævarsson 45'	Stadium: Swedbank Stadion; Attendance: 18,843; Referee: Stefan Johannesson (Stocksund)

15 April 2011 Round 3	Djurgårdens IF	0–1	Malmö FF	Stockholm
19.00		(Report)	Durmaz 90+1'	Stadium: Stockholm Stadion; Attendance: 9,055; Referee: Martin Hansson (Holmsjö)

20 April 2011 Round 4	Malmö FF	1–0	Mjällby AIF	Malmö
19.00	Molins 75'	(Report)		Stadium: Swedbank Stadion; Attendance: 15,144; Referee: Jonas Eriksson (Sigtuna)

24 April 2011 Round 5	IF Elfsborg	3–0	Malmö FF	Borås
16.30	Augustsson 65'; Larsson 86'; Jawo 90+1'	(Report)		Stadium: Borås Arena; Attendance: 10,616; Referee: Stefan Johannesson (Stocksund)

2 May 2011 Round 6	Malmö FF	0–2	IFK Göteborg	Malmö
20.00		(Report)	Hysén 31', 66'	Stadium: Swedbank Stadion; Attendance: 17,221; Referee: Martin Hansson (Holmsjö)

8 May 2011 Round 7	Syrianska FC	0–0	Malmö FF	Södertälje
16.30		(Report)		Stadium: Södertälje Fotbollsarena; Attendance: 3,361; Referee: Michael Lerjéus (Skövde)

15 May 2011 Round 8	Malmö FF	2–1	Örebro SK	Malmö
14.00	Molins 62', 80'	(Report)	Rama 37'	Stadium: Swedbank Stadion; Attendance: 12,073; Referee: Jonas Eriksson (Sigtuna)

20 May 2011 Round 9	BK Häcken	1–1	Malmö FF	Gothenborg
19.00	Ranégie 35'	(Report)	Pekalski 42'	Stadium: Rambergsvallen; Attendance: 3,854; Referee: Martin Strömbergsson (Gävle)

24 May 2011 Round 10	Malmö FF	0–3^{[1]}	Helsingborgs IF	Malmö
19.00		(Report)		Stadium: Swedbank Stadion; Attendance: 23,612; Referee: Stefan Johannesson (Stocksund)

12 June 2011 Round 11	AIK	2–0	Malmö FF	Solna
19.00	M.Bangura 17'; T.Bangura 46'	(Report)		Stadium: Råsunda; Attendance: 16,739; Referee: Martin Hansson (Holmsjö)

20 June 2011 Round 12	Malmö FF	2–0	Kalmar FF	Malmö
19.00	Larsson 12'; Jansson 58'	(Report)		Stadium: Swedbank Stadion; Attendance: 11,804; Referee: Daniel Stålhammar (Landskrona)

23 June 2011 Round 13	Malmö FF	0–0	Gefle IF	Malmö
19.00		(Report)		Stadium: Swedbank Stadion; Attendance: 10,655; Referee: Martin Ingvarsson (Hässleholm)

26 June 2011 Round 14	GAIS	2–0	Malmö FF	Gothenburg
16.30	Celik 2'; Santos 75'	(Report)		Stadium: Gamla Ullevi; Attendance: 5,104; Referee: Michael Lerjéus (Skövde)

3 July 2011 Round 15	Malmö FF	2–1	IFK Norrköping	Malmö
16.30	Durmaz 4'; Larsson 45'	(Report)	Khalili 78'	Stadium: Swedbank Stadion; Attendance: 9,778; Referee: Martin Hansson (Holmsjö)

9 July 2011 Round 16	IFK Norrköping	0–0	Malmö FF	Norrköping
18.00		(Report)		Stadium: Idrottsparken; Attendance: 6,282; Referee: Tobias Mattsson (Karlstad)

23 July 2011 Round 18	Helsingborgs IF	2–2	Malmö FF	Helsingborg
16.00	Sundin 25'; Jönsson 54'	(Report)	Halsti 37'; Rexhepi 45'	Stadium: Olympia; Attendance: 16,500; Referee: Eriksson (Sigtuna)

6 August 2011 Round 20	Mjällby AIF	1–1	Malmö FF	Hällevik
16.00	Eriksson 65'	(Report)	Hamad 57'	Stadium: Strandvallen; Attendance: 7,000; Referee: Stefan Johannesson (Stocksund)

20 August 2011 Round 22	Malmö FF	2–1	GAIS	Malmö
16.00	Pękalski 4'; Fernández 88'	(Report)	Wánderson 64'	Stadium: Swedbank Stadion; Attendance: 8,386; Referee: Johan Hamlin (Bro)

28 August 2011 Round 23	Malmö FF	2–1	IF Elfsborg	Malmö
16.30	Figueiredo 32', 68'	(Report)	Nilsson 53'	Stadium: Swedbank Stadion; Attendance: 11,333; Referee: Martin Hansson (Holmsjö)

8 September 2011 Round 21	Gefle IF	2–0	Malmö FF	Gävle
19.00	Theorin 24' (pen.); Dahlberg 79'	(Report)		Stadium: Strömvallen; Attendance: 3,305; Referee: Johan Hamlin (Bro)

11 September 2011 Round 24	IFK Göteborg	0–0	Malmö FF	Gothenburg
16.30		(Report)		Stadium: Gamla Ullevi; Attendance: 11,640; Referee: Markus Strömbergsson (Gävle)

18 September 2011 Round 25	Malmö FF	1–1	Trelleborgs FF	Malmö
16.30	Larsson 4' (pen.)	(Report)	Haynes 55'	Stadium: Swedbank Stadion; Attendance: 9,213; Referee: Michael Lerjéus (Skövde)

21 September 2011 Round 26	Halmstads BK	1–5	Malmö FF	Halmstad
19.00	Johansson 66'	(Report)	Ranégie 29', 89'; Hamad 40'; Durmaz 53'; Figueiredo 81'	Stadium: Örjans Vall; Attendance: 3,065; Referee: Martin Strömbergsson (Gävle)

25 September 2011 Round 27	Malmö FF	1–1	AIK	Malmö
16.30	Ranégie 90+2'	(Report)	Backman 84'	Stadium: Swedbank Stadion; Attendance: 10,887; Referee: Daniel Stålhammar (Landskrona)

2 October 2011 Round 28	Kalmar FF	1–2	Malmö FF	Kalmar
16.30	Santos 66'	(Report)	Hamad 68'; Durmaz 82'	Stadium: Guldfågeln Arena; Attendance: 8,388; Referee: Johan Hamlin (Bro)

13 October 2011 Round 17	Malmö FF	1–0	BK Häcken	Malmö
19.00	Mehmeti 60'	(Report)		Stadium: Swedbank Stadion; Attendance: 6,784; Referee: Tobias Mattsson (Karlstad)

15 October 2011^{[2]} Round 19	Malmö FF	1–0	Djurgårdens IF	Malmö
11.00	Figueiredo 45'	(Report)		Stadium: Swedbank Stadion; Attendance: 13,377; Referee: Markus Strömbergsson (Gävle)

17 October 2011 Round 29	Malmö FF	1–0	Syrianska FC	Malmö
19.00	Mehmeti 51'	(Report)		Stadium: Swedbank Stadion; Attendance: 6,715; Referee: Daniel Stålhammar (Landskrona)

23 October 2011 Round 30	Örebro SK	1–2	Malmö FF	Örebro
16.30	Paulinho 47'	(Report)	Jansson 82'; Larsson 90+4'	Stadium: Behrn Arena; Attendance: 5,112; Referee: Martin Strömbergsson (Gävle)

=== Svenska Cupen ===
Kickoff times are in CEST.

11 May 2011 Round 3	Jönköpings Södra IF	0–4	Malmö FF	Jönköping
19.00		(Report)	Molins 44'; Mutavdžić 46'; Larsson 75'; Vinzents 89'	Stadium: Stadsparksvallen; Attendance: 2,476; Referee: Michael Lerjéus (Skövde)

29 May 2011 Round 4	Halmstads BK	0–3	Malmö FF	Halmstad
18.00		(Report)	Larsson 18'; Andersson 33'; Hamad 66'	Stadium: Örjans Vall; Attendance: 1,386; Referee: Martin Hansson (Holmsjö)

15 June 2011 Quarter-finals	Kalmar FF	1–1 (a.e.t.) (5–4 p)	Malmö FF	Kalmar
19.00	Dauda 52'	(Report)	Nazari 64'	Stadium: Guldfågeln Arena; Attendance: 3,689; Referee: Martin Ingvarsson (Hässleholm)
	Penalties
	Rydström (penalty scored); Eriksson (penalty scored); Thorbjörnsson (penalty scored); Santos (penalty missed); Berisha (penalty scored)		(penalty scored) Larsson; (penalty scored) Ricardinho; (penalty missed) Durmaz; (penalty scored) Figueiredo; (penalty missed) Mutavdžić

=== Svenska Supercupen ===
Kickoff times are in CET.

19 March 2011 Final	Malmö FF	1–2	Helsingborgs IF	Malmö
15.30	Figueiredo 16'	(Report)	Nilsson 2'; Sundin 90'	Stadium: Swedbank Stadion; Attendance: 10,362; Referee: Markus Strömbergsson (Gävle)

=== UEFA Champions League ===
==== Qualifying phase and play-off round ====
===== Second qualifying round =====
13 July 2011 First Leg	Malmö FF (Sweden)	2–0	(Faroe Islands) HB Tórshavn	Malmö, Sweden
19.00 (CEST)	Rexhepi 58'; Holm 77' (o.g.)	(Report)		Stadium: Swedbank Stadion; Attendance: 12,551; Referee: Marios Panayi (Cyprus)

19 July 2011 Second Leg	HB Tórshavn (Faroe Islands)	1–1 (1–3 agg.)	(Sweden) Malmö FF	Tórshavn, Faroe Islands
20.00 (WEST)	Benjaminsen 70'	(Report)	Figueiredo 90+1'	Stadium: Gundadalur Stadium; Attendance: 688; Referee: Milenko Vukadinovic (Serbia)

===== Third qualifying round =====
26 July 2011 First Leg	Rangers (Scotland)	0–1	(Sweden) Malmö FF	Glasgow, Scotland
20.45 (BST)		(Report)	Larsson 18'	Stadium: Ibrox Stadium; Attendance: 28,828; Referee: Antonio Mateu Lahoz (Spain)

3 August 2011 Second Leg	Malmö FF (Sweden)	1–1 (2–1 agg.)	(Scotland) Rangers	Malmö, Sweden
19.00 (CEST)	Hamad 80'	(Report)	Jelavić 24'	Stadium: Swedbank Stadion; Attendance: 19,084; Referee: Vladislav Bezborodov (Russia)

===== Play-off round =====
17 August 2011 First Leg	Dinamo Zagreb (Croatia)	4–1	(Sweden) Malmö FF	Zagreb, Croatia
20.45 (CEST)	Sammir 4', 60' (pen.); Rukavina 56'; Bećiraj 84'	Report	Mehmeti 17'	Stadium: Stadion Maksimir; Attendance: 30,065; Referee: Pedro Proença (Portugal)

23 August 2011 Second Leg	Malmö FF (Sweden)	2–0 (3–4 agg.)	(Croatia) Dinamo Zagreb	Malmö, Sweden
20.45 (CEST)	Figueiredo 69'; Jansson 86'	Report		Stadium: Swedbank Stadion; Attendance: 15,331; Referee: Nicola Rizzoli (Italy)

=== UEFA Europa League ===
==== Group stage ====
Key to colours in group tables
Group winners and runners-up advanced to the round of 32

Pos	Team	Pld	W	D	L	GF	GA	GD	Pts	Qualification
1	(Ukraine) Metalist Kharkiv	6	4	2	0	15	6	+9	14	Advance to knockout phase
2	(Netherlands) AZ	6	1	5	0	10	7	+3	8 (Note: Tied on head-to-head results. Overall goal difference was used as the tiebreaker.)	Advance to knockout phase
3	Austria Wien	6	2	2	2	10	11	−1	8	
4	(Sweden) Malmö FF	6	0	1	5	4	15	−11	1	

Source: Soccerway
Notes:

Kickoff times are in CET.

15 September 2011 Match Day 1	AZ (Netherlands)	4–1	(Sweden) Malmö FF	Alkmaar, Netherlands
21:05	Altidore 21'; Elm 32' (pen.); Maher 39'; Holman 49'	Report	Larsson 72' (pen.)	Stadium: AFAS Stadion; Attendance: 11,905; Referee: Ivan Bebek (Croatia)

29 September 2011 Match Day 2	Malmö FF (Sweden)	1–2	Austria Wien	Malmö, Sweden
19:00	Ranégie 82'	Report	Barazite 17'; A. Grünwald 36'	Stadium: Swedbank Stadion; Attendance: 10,802; Referee: Pawel Gil (Poland)

20 October 2011 Match Day 3	Malmö FF (Sweden)	1–4	(Ukraine) Metalist Kharkiv	Malmö, Sweden
19:00	Hamad 22'	Report	Cristaldo 32'; Fininho 45'; Edmar 57'; Devich 73'	Stadium: Swedbank Stadion; Attendance: 8,466; Referee: Fırat Aydınus (Turkey)

3 November 2011 Match Day 4	Metalist Kharkiv (Ukraine)	3–1	(Sweden) Malmö FF	Kharkiv, Ukraine
21:05	Taison 46', 56'; Fininho 90'	Report	Ranégie 66'	Stadium: Metalist Stadium; Attendance: 25,883; Referee: Matej Jug (Slovenia)

30 November 2011 Match Day 5	Malmö FF (Sweden)	0–0	(Netherlands) AZ	Malmö, Sweden
19:00		Report		Stadium: Swedbank Stadion; Attendance: 7,632; Referee: Mark Courtney (Northern Ireland)

15 December 2011 Match Day 6	Austria Wien	2–0	(Sweden) Malmö FF	Vienna, Austria
21:05	Liendl 62'; Barazite 80'	Report		Stadium: Generali Arena; Referee: Antti Munukka (Finland)

== Non competitive ==
=== Pre-season ===
==== Copa del Sol ====
29 January 2011 Round of 16	Malmö FF (Sweden)	1–2	(Russia) Spartak Moscow	Elche, Spain
16.00	Molins 23'	(Report)	Halsti 25' (o.g.); Dzyuba 43'	Stadium: Estadio Martínez Valero

1 February 2011 Round of 16 Losers	Rapid Bucharest (Romania)	0–0 (1–3 p)	(Sweden) Malmö FF	La Manga, Spain
19.30		(Report)		Stadium: La Manga Stadium
	Penalties
	Sburlea (penalty missed); Roman (penalty missed); Spadacio (penalty missed); Cássio (penalty scored)		(penalty scored) Andersson; (penalty scored) Hamad; (penalty missed) Figueiredo; (penalty scored) Ricardinho

4 February 2011 Placement Game	Malmö FF (Sweden)	0–1	(Romania) Sportul Studenţesc	Benidorm, Spain
16.30		(Report)	Maxim 53'

==== Friendlies ====
12 February 2011 Friendly	Malmö FF	2–2	Trelleborgs FF	Höör, Sweden
14.00	Larsson 44', 81'	(Report)	Wihlborg 57'; Jensen 72'	Stadium: Färs och Frosta Arena; Attendance: 2,129; Referee: Daniel Stålhammar (Landskrona)

26 February 2011 Friendly	Brøndby IF (Denmark)	0–1	(Sweden) Malmö FF	Brøndby, Denmark
13.00		(Report)	Hamad 35'	Stadium: Brøndby Stadium

12 March 2011 Friendly	Wigan Athletic (England)	1–3	(Sweden) Malmö FF	Wigan, England
13.00	70' (o.g.)	(Report)	Figueiredo 44'; Durmaz 60'; Larsson 67'	Stadium: Training Pitch

26 March 2011 Friendly	Malmö FF	1–2	BK Häcken	Malmö, Sweden
14.00	Ricardinho 50'	(Report)	Ranégie 43'; Chatto 85'	Stadium: Swedbank Stadion; Attendance: 1,249; Referee: Andreas Ekberg (Lund)

=== Mid-season ===
6 June 2011 Friendly	Malmö FF	2–2	IF Elfsborg	Malmö, Sweden
15.00	Ali 44'; Nilsson 62'	(Report)	Nilsson 37'; Johansson 78'	Stadium: Swedbank Stadion; Attendance: 1,500; Referee: Robert Daradic (Helsingborg)

14 August 2011 Friendly	Malmö FF (Sweden)	2–2 (2–3 p)	(Italy) Milan	Malmö, Sweden
18.30	Durmaz 36'; Malm 48'	(Report)	Cassano 27'; Boateng 89'	Stadium: Swedbank Stadion; Attendance: 23,180; Referee: Peter Rasmussen (Denmark)
	Penalties
	Ricardinho (penalty scored); Fernández (penalty scored); Nilsson (penalty missed)		(penalty scored) Cassano; (penalty scored) Emanuelson; (penalty scored) Oddo

=== Post league-season ===
23 November 2011 Friendly	Malmö FF (Sweden)	2–0	(Republic of Ireland) Shamrock Rovers	Malmö, Sweden
19.00	Hamad 42'; Nilsson 62'	(Report)		Stadium: Swedbank Stadion

8 December 2011 Friendly	OB (Denmark)	0–3	(Sweden) Malmö FF	Odense, Denmark
13.45		(Report)	Durmaz 22', 37'; Ranégie 33' (pen.)	Stadium: Dyrskuepladsen

== Abandoned matches ==
=== Malmö FF vs. Helsingborg ===
1. The Allsvenskan match between Malmö FF and Helsingborg, played at Swedbank Stadion on 24 May, was suspended in the 30th match minute after two spectator related incidents. After Rachid Bouaouzan had opened up the score for Helsingborg a spectator from Malmö FF's standing section threw a firecracker popularly called "bangers" onto the pitch and close to Helsingborg keeper Pär Hansson. The result of the "banger" was that Hansson displayed visually and verbally the fact that he had been hurt and was suffering some kind of ringing in his right ear. Simultaneously a supporter from the same section jumped over the gates restricting access to the pitch and started walking towards Hansson. The man managed to give Hansson a push before being tackled to the ground by Helsingborg player Peter Larsson. The referee Stefan Johannesson ordered all players and club staff of the pitch and adjoining areas as the police carried the attacker off the pitch and into custody. After a twenty-minute wait the speaker announced that the referee had taken the decision to abandon the match and evacuate the spectators from the ground. On 17 June 2011 the Swedish Football Association reached a decision on the outcome of the game. Helsingborg were awarded the game 3–0 although being fined 25 000 SEK, Malmö FF were fined 150 000 SEK as well as the introduction of a net in front of the standing section at Swedbank Stadion. On 18 October 2011, the man who invaded the pitch was sentenced to 120 day-fines, not only for invading the pitch but also for throwing the firecracker. Both Malmö FF and Canal + are planning to sue the man for causing financial damages.

=== Malmö FF vs. Djurgården ===
2. The Allsvenskan match between Malmö FF and Djurgården, played at Swedbank Stadion on 30 July, was suspended in the 11th match minute after a spectator related incident. Dardan Rexhepi scored the first goal of the match in the 5th match minute to open up the score for the home side. In the 7th minute, Djurgården forward Daniel Sjölund was given a yellow-card and six fireworks were launched. According to Canal+, one of the fireworks was close to hitting a photographer. There were different opinions as to where the fireworks came from: Canal+ believed that the fireworks came from the section above the Djurgården terrace while the police believed that all the fireworks came from within the Djurgården section. On 5 September, the Swedish FA made the decision that the game will be replayed from kick-off on 15 October as there was a lack of evidence regarding where the fireworks came from. Due to the rematch date, the Malmö–Syrianska game date was moved to 17 October, as all teams should have at least two rest-days between each game. As a result, Malmö FF played three straight home games in just five days. Malmö FF appealed to change the outcome of the decision to a 3–0 win in Malmö FF's favour since they believed there was sufficient amount of evidence to confirm that the fireworks came from Djurgården supporters. However, on 7 October 2011, the appeal was declined, and the rematch was set to be kicked off on 15 October at 11 am. However, Malmö FF wanted to start the game at 12 pm. The rematch was won by Malmö 1–0.
