= Jiloan Hamad =

Iraqi-Swedish footballer (born 1990)

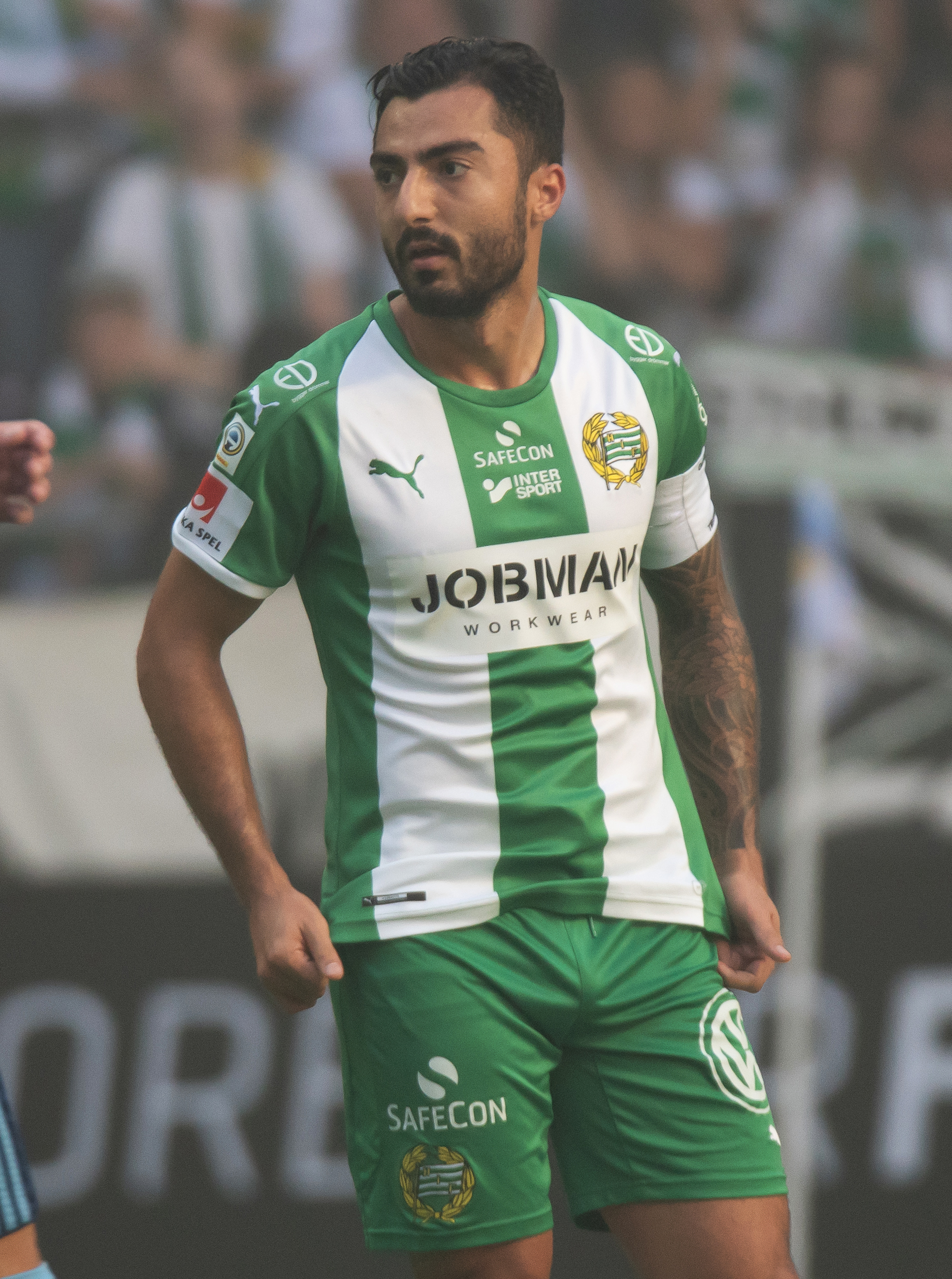
- Hamad with Hammarby IF in 2018

Personal information
- Full name: Jiloan Mohammed Hamad Amin Alla Werdi
- Date of birth: 6 November 1990 (age 36)
- Place of birth: Baku, Azerbaijan SSR, Soviet Union
- Height: 1.73 m (5 ft 8 in)
- Position: Winger

Youth career
- BK Forward

Senior career*
Years	Team	Apps	(Gls)
2007	BK Forward	23	(8)
2008–2013	Malmö FF	126	(22)
2014–2017	1899 Hoffenheim II	6	(0)
2014–2017	1899 Hoffenheim	15	(1)
2015	→ Standard Liège (loan)	6	(1)
2017–2018	Hammarby IF	54	(15)
2019	Incheon United	11	(1)
2019–2021	Gorica	52	(6)
2021–2022	Örebro SK	41	(6)
2023	Al-Kholood	5	(0)
2023–2024	Uthai Thani	23	(6)
2024	Lee Man	6	(0)
2025	Zakho	2	(0)
Total		370	(66)

International career
2006–2007	Sweden U17	9	(4)
2007–2009	Sweden U19	17	(2)
2009–2012	Sweden U21	28	(3)
2011–2018	Sweden	8	(0)
2019	Iraq	1	(0)
- * Club domestic league appearances and goals

Jiloan Mohammed Hamad Amin Alla Werdi (Arabic: جِيلْوَان مُحَمَّد حَمَد أَمِين عَلَاء وَرْدِيّ; born 6 November 1990), simply known as Jiloan Hamad, is a former professional footballer who played as a winger. Born in Soviet Azerbaijan and of Iraqi descent, Hamad moved to Sweden and represented their national team before switching to represent Iraq.

== Early and personal life ==
Hamad was born in Azerbaijan, and is of Kurdish descent. His family originates from Ranya, Iraqi Kurdistan. They sought refugee status in both Turkmenistan and Russia before settling in Sweden in 1992, when Jiloan was two years old. Mohammed Hamad, Jiloan's father, was a guerrilla warrior in the Kurdish peshmerga for 15 years before fleeing Iraq together with his wife and children.

== Club career ==
=== BK Forward ===
Having joined their youth setup aged 14–15, Hamad started his footballing career at the local club BK Forward in Örebro. He debuted in the senior team in 2006, aged 16, when the club competed in the Swedish third tier called Division 1. During the upcoming two seasons, he played 23 competitive games for the club, scoring 8 goals. During this period, he enjoyed a fruitful partnership with Jimmy Durmaz, his childhood friend who later would move on to play with him at Malmö FF. Before switching to the Scanian team he was refused by the local club Örebro SK, with the club citing that Hamad "was too short".

=== Malmö FF ===
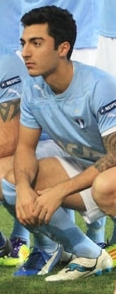
Hamad with Malmö FF in 2011

Hamad came to Malmö FF from BK Forward in December 2007. He made his Allsvenskan debut on 17 September 2008 in a 0–4-loss against IF Elfsborg. After only having played one match for the club in 2008, Hamad had a breakthrough in 2009 when he played 20 matches and scored two goals. In 2010, he battled with teammate Jimmy Durmaz for the position as left midfielder. Hamad ended up playing 27 games although only starting in 10, the majority of which were played as right midfielder. In the final game of 2010, he scored the game-winning goal against Mjällby AIF that secured the title, the day after his 20th birthday.

Hamad started the 2011 season with injury problems and missed the start of the season. He recovered and became the natural choice for playing right midfielder after team-mate Guillermo Molins was sold in the summer transfer window of 2011. Hamad also participated in the club's campaign to qualify for the 2011–12 UEFA Champions League and scored the goal that took the club through to the play-off round after equalizing at home against Rangers. He continued to play in Europe as the club qualified for the group stage of the 2011–12 UEFA Europa League after losing in the play-off round of the Champions League. During the 2011 season Hamad signed a new contract to the end of the 2013 season.

Hamad played all of Malmö FF's 30 league matches during the 2012 season. He also scored six goals which was his best goal production since joining the club. Hamad was also given the captaincy for the majority of the team's matches. Former captain Daniel Andersson had stepped down to focus on coaching duties before the beginning of the season and new captain Ulrich Vinzents received limited time on the pitch.

The 2013 season was Hamad's first and only season as full-time captain for the club. In total he played 28 matches and scored eight goals in the league. He also played all matches for the club during the qualification stage for the 2013–14 UEFA Europa League and scored two goals. Some of his goals in the early part of the season was match-deciding, on 14 April 2013 he scored the only goal of the game in the home fixture against Kalmar FF, one week later he made the same accomplishment in the away fixture against AIK. Malmö FF secured the title one round before the competition of the league and Hamad could raise Lennart Johanssons Pokal on 3 November 2013 after a last home win against Syrianska FC. His last match for the club was the 2013 Svenska Supercupen against IFK Göteborg which Malmö FF won 3–2. For his performances in the 2013 Allsvenskan season he won midfielder of the year and was also nominated for most valuable player of the year.

=== 1899 Hoffenheim ===
On 30 October 2013, Bundesliga club 1899 Hoffenheim confirmed the free transfer of Jiloan Hamad to the club with a contract until 2017. The transfer went through on 1 January 2014 when the German transfer window opened. During the same spring he played 8 competitive games for his new side.

After attracting a serious injury during his loan spell at Standard Liège in 2015, he made his comeback for Hoffenheim in a Bundesliga fixture against Bayer Leverkusen on 23 January 2016, in which he scored the first goal in a 1–1 draw.

=== Standard Liège ===
In late January 2015, he was loaned to Belgian first tier side Standard Liège for the remainder of the 2014–2015 season. He played 6 competitive games for the side, scoring once, before injuring his knee in late March 2015, effectively ending his season.

=== Hammarby IF ===
He returned to his native country on 7 February 2017, signing a two-year deal (with an option for a further) with the Stockholm-based side Hammarby IF. Hamad scored two goals in three games as Hammarby got knocked out in the group stage of the 2016–17 Svenska Cupen. On 3 April, the first match day of Allsvenskan 2017, he contributed with an assist to Rômulo's 2–1-goal in an away loss against IFK Norrköping. He scored a brace for his side in a 2–1 away win against Halmstad on 14 May. Hamad scored his first home goal at Tele2 Arena on 13 August 2017, from the penalty spot in a 2–2 draw against Östersund.

=== Incheon United ===
On 29 January 2019, Hamad signed with Incheon United in the K League 1. On 23 July 2019 Jiloan Hamad parted ways with Incheon by mutual consent.

=== Al-Kholood ===
On 31 January 2023, Hamad joined Saudi First Division League side Al-Kholood.

=== Lee Man ===
On 8 July 2024, Hamad joined Hong Kong Premier League club Lee Man.

== International career ==
Having been born in Azerbaijan, Hamad was able to represent both Iraq, Azerbaijan and Sweden.

=== Sweden ===
==== Under-21 ====
Hamad was a member and also for some time the captain of the Sweden U21 national side. On 7 September 2010, Hamad scored a last-minute goal for the 1–0 away win against Bulgaria U21 in a 2011 UEFA Euro U-21 Championship qualifier. In early 2011, Hamad revealed that he had rejected an offer from Azerbaijan coach Berti Vogts to play for his country of birth.

==== Senior ====
Hamad was first with the Sweden squad for the 2011 January training tour and played his first cap for Sweden during this tour. His first cap for Sweden was against Botswana on 19 January 2011. Hamad was once again selected for the annual training camp for the Sweden national team in January 2012. The squad selection for the camp traditionally features the best Swedish players in domestic and other Scandinavian leagues. He was selected for the friendly against England on 14 November, but did not get any playing time, and was then again selected for the winter tour in 2013.

After a five-year absence, Hamad was called up to the Swedish squad for the training tour in January 2018. He made his return on the pitch in a 1–1 draw against Estonia, where several pundits praised Hamad's performance and voted him as the best player on the pitch.

=== Iraq ===
Hamad was reported to be called up by Iraq in October 2018 though he declined to comment. He was not called into Sweden's squad in December 2018. On 26 February 2019, Hamad announced that he would represent the Iraq national team and "help the team reach new heights" from February 2019 and onward.

== Career statistics ==
=== Club ===
As of match played 14 November 2018

Appearances and goals by club, season and competition
Club	Season	League			Cup		Continental		Total	
Club	Season	Division	Apps	Goals	Apps	Goals	Apps	Goals	Apps	Goals
BK Forward	2006	Division 1	0	0	0	0	—		0	0
BK Forward	2007	Division 1	23	8	0	0	—		23	8
BK Forward	Total		23	8	0	0	—		23	8
Malmö FF	2008	Allsvenskan	1	0	2	0	—		3	0
Malmö FF	2009	Allsvenskan	20	2	0	0	—		20	2
Malmö FF	2010	Allsvenskan	27	3	2	0	—		29	3
Malmö FF	2011	Allsvenskan	20	3	1	1	11	2	32	6
Malmö FF	2012	Allsvenskan	30	6	1	0	—		31	6
Malmö FF	2013	Allsvenskan	28	8	3	1	6	2	37	11
Malmö FF	Total		126	22	9	2	17	4	152	28
1899 Hoffenheim	2013–14	Bundesliga	7	0	1	0	—		8	0
1899 Hoffenheim	2014–15	Bundesliga	1	0	0	0	—		1	0
1899 Hoffenheim	2015–16	Bundesliga	7	1	0	0	—		7	1
1899 Hoffenheim	2016–17	Bundesliga	0	0	0	0	—		0	0
1899 Hoffenheim	Total		15	1	1	0	0	0	16	1
1899 Hoffenheim II (loan)	2013–14	Regionalliga	1	0	0	0	—		1	0
1899 Hoffenheim II (loan)	2014–15	Regionalliga	2	0	0	0	—		2	0
1899 Hoffenheim II (loan)	2015–16	Regionalliga	2	0	0	0	—		2	0
1899 Hoffenheim II (loan)	2016–17	Regionalliga	1	0	0	0	—		1	0
1899 Hoffenheim II (loan)	Total		6	0	0	0	0	0	6	0
Standard Liège (loan)	2014–15	Belgian Pro League	6	1	0	0	—		6	1
Hammarby IF	2017	Allsvenskan	25	4	4	2	—		29	6
Hammarby IF	2018	Allsvenskan	29	11	4	2	—		33	13
Hammarby IF	Total		54	15	8	4	0	0	62	19
Career total			230	47	18	6	17	4	265	57

=== International ===
As of match played 10 October 2019

Appearances and goals by national team and year
National team	Year	Apps	Goals
Sweden	2011	2	0
Sweden	2012	2	0
Sweden	2013	2	0
Sweden	2014	0	0
Sweden	2015	0	0
Sweden	2016	0	0
Sweden	2017	0	0
Sweden	2018	2	0
Sweden	Total	8	0
Iraq	2019	1	0
Iraq	Total	1	0
Career total		9	0

== Honours ==
Malmö FF

- Allsvenskan: 2010, 2013
- Svenska Supercupen: 2013

Individual

- Allsvenskan midfielder of the year: 2013

== See also ==
- List of Iraq international footballers
