= Pontus Jansson =

Swedish association football player

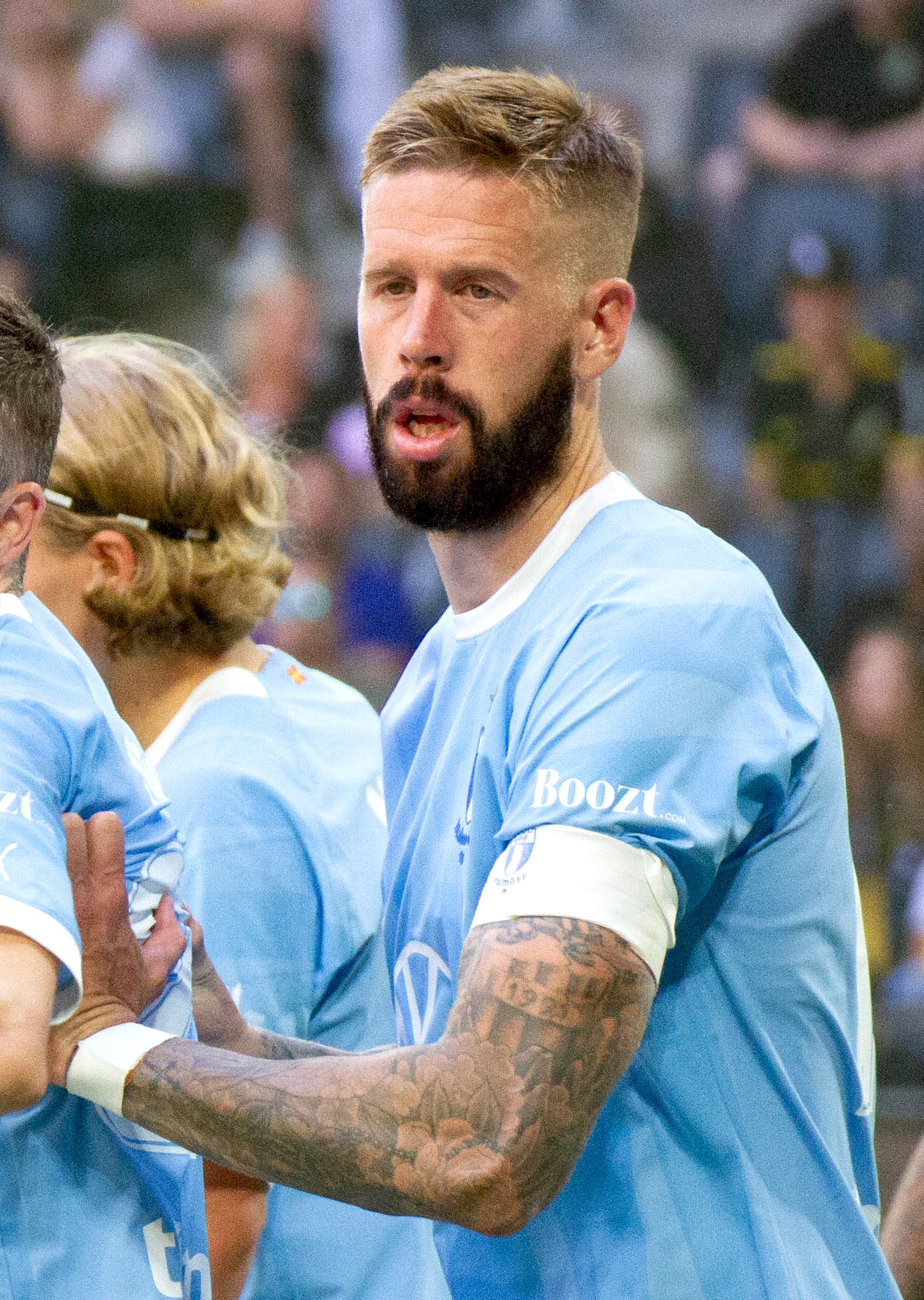
- Jansson with Malmö FF in 2023

Personal information
- Full name: Pontus Sven Gustav Jansson
- Date of birth: 13 February 1991 (age 35)
- Place of birth: Arlöv, Sweden
- Height: 1.94 m (6 ft 4 in)
- Position: Centre-back

Team information
- Current team: Malmö FF
- Number: 18

Youth career
- 2004–2006: Arlövs BI
- 2006–2009: Malmö FF

Senior career*
| Years | Team | Apps | (Gls) |
| 2009–2014 | Malmö FF | 98 | (6) |
| 2009 | → IFK Malmö (loan) | 8 | (4) |
| 2014–2017 | Torino | 16 | (1) |
| 2016–2017 | → Leeds United (loan) | 34 | (3) |
| 2017–2019 | Leeds United | 81 | (6) |
| 2019–2023 | Brentford | 107 | (4) |
| 2023– | Malmö FF | 61 | (5) |

International career
| 2007–2008 | Sweden U17 | 13 | (0) |
| 2008–2009 | Sweden U19 | 9 | (3) |
| 2011–2012 | Sweden U21 | 15 | (1) |
| 2012–2020 | Sweden | 27 | (0) |
- * Club domestic league appearances and goals as of 19:35, 18 April 2026 (UTC)

Pontus Sven Gustav Jansson (Swedish pronunciation: [ˈpɔ̌nːtɵs ˈjɑ̌ːnsɔn]; born 13 February 1991) is a Swedish professional footballer who plays as a centre-back for Malmö FF.

Jansson started his career with local club Malmö FF before moving to Italy to join Torino. He failed to impress at the Turin-based club and was sent out on loan to Leeds United, before making the move permanent. After three years in Leeds, he signed for fellow Championship side Brentford in 2019, becoming captain shortly after. After two seasons in the Premier League with Brentford between 2021 and 2023, Jansson returned to Malmö FF.

A full international between 2012 and 2021, Jansson won 27 caps for the Sweden national team and represented his country at UEFA Euro 2016, the 2018 FIFA World Cup, and UEFA Euro 2020.

== Club career ==
=== Malmö FF ===
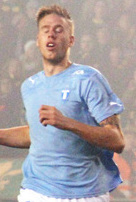
Pontus Jansson playing for Malmö FF in 2012

Jansson started his career at local club Arlövs BI. In 2006 at age 15 he transferred to Malmö FF. He played in youth teams until he made his first team debut in 2009. Jansson played in a variety of positions in the early stages of his career until deciding on centre back in the start of the 2010 season. He had made his first team debut as forward the year before. When teammate Jasmin Sudić was long term injured in the beginning of the year the manager decided that Jansson would take Sudić's place at centre-back despite mostly playing as a striker. Jansson played in 18 games in the 2010 league winning season for Malmö. He missed the latter part of the season due to injury problems.

Starting out the 2011 season on the bench, Jansson gained new manager Rikard Norling's trust and once again took a spot in the starting eleven. Jansson finished the season with 15 league matches and nine matches in Europe played. Many considered him to be the club's best player of 2011 even though he played for only half of the season. Jansson was also mentioned as a potential candidate for becoming the club's new captain as Daniel Andersson announced that he would step down during the 2012 season. The 2012 season was Jansson's big breakthrough season as he played all 30 league matches for Malmö FF, playing the first part of the season with Andersson and the latter part with newcomer Filip Helander by his side in the defensive line.

Jansson continued to be one of the club's most important players during the league title winning 2013 season where he played 24 matches and scored one goal. The goal was an important equalizer against title contender IFK Göteborg in the home fixture on 25 August 2013, Malmö FF went on to win the match 3–1. He was nominated as defender of the year for the 2013 Allsvenskan for his overall performance during the season. Jansson also played all of Malmö FF's matches in the qualification stage for the 2013–14 UEFA Europa League.

During the 2014 season Jansson played nine out of 12 possible matches before his transfer to Torino. He also played all of the matches for the club in the 2013–14 Svenska Cupen campaign where the club progressed to the semi-finals. He started the 2014 season in the starting eleven but was replaced by Erik Johansson when it was clear that Jansson would leave the club during the summer transfer window.

=== Torino ===
On 24 April 2014, Torino announced they had signed Jansson on a free transfer. He officially joined the Italian side on 1 July 2014. He made 16 appearances in all competitions during his first season, with nine coming in the league, one in Coppa Italia and six in the UEFA Europa League.

On 30 April 2016 he scored his first goal in Serie A, opening the score in a 5–1 defeat of Udinese. During the 2015–16 season, he played seven league games and two Coppa Italia matches.

=== Leeds United ===
On 18 August 2016, Jansson joined English side Leeds United on a season-long loan, where he was handed the number 18 shirt. Torino also revealed that as part of the deal Leeds had a clause to make the deal a permanent move. He made his debut for Leeds on 23 August 2016, starting in an EFL Cup fixture against Luton Town. His league debut came on 10 September 2016 in a 1–0 defeat against Huddersfield Town in a West Yorkshire derby. On 17 September, Jansson received the man of the match award in a 2–0 victory against Cardiff City. He scored his first goal for Leeds on 5 November 2016 – a headed goal in a 3–2 victory against Norwich City at Carrow Road — and won the Championship Player of the Month Award for December 2016. After returning to the side following a two-match suspension for accumulating 10 yellow cards, on 25 January 2017 Jansson made his 22nd appearance for Leeds in a 2–0 win over Nottingham Forest. On 2 February 2017, Jansson signed a permanent deal with Leeds worth £3.5 million which would officially take place when his loan expired at the end of the 2016–17 season. Jansson subsequently went on to sign a three-year contract at the club.

On 11 March, Jansson was named in the EFL Team of the Season. On 21 March, Jansson and teammate Chris Wood were named in the Championship Team of the Season.

After being handed a three-match ban for receiving 15 yellow cards during the 2016–17 season, with two of these games carried over to the start of the 2017–18 season, he made his first start as a permanent Leeds player on 12 August 2017 in a 0–0 draw against Preston North End. On 25 October 2017, Jansson signed a new five-year contract, with the long-term deal keeping him at Leeds until the end of the 2021–22 season. He scored his first goal of the season on 1 December 2017, in Leeds' 1–1 draw against Aston Villa.

After his participation for Sweden at the World Cup Quarter-Finals, Jansson was given extra vacation for the 2018–19 pre-season and as a result missed all of Leeds' pre-season friendlies. In August 2018, Leeds rejected a bid of £10 million for Jansson from Russian Premier League side FC Krasnodar.

After a controversial performance from the referee in Leeds' 1–1 draw against Brentford on 6 October, Jansson spoke out against the referee in the post match interview. As a result, he was given a one match ban on 23 October for his comments relating to the referee's performance and/or use of foul language.

After helping Leeds to a third-place finish, on 24 April, Jansson was voted into the Championship PFA Team of the Year for the 2018–19 season.

After Jansson's team-mate Mateusz Klich scored a controversial goal against Aston Villa on 28 April 2019, Head Coach Marcelo Bielsa declared that his team should allow an unchallenged equaliser to be scored (Bielsa could be seen shouting "Give the goal! Give the goal!" from the touchline). From the restart, Albert Adomah essentially walked the ball into net unchallenged by 10 Leeds players, with only a frustrated and disbelieving Jansson giving chase and nearly dispossessing the forward.

On 14 May 2019, Leeds' Head Coach Marcelo Bielsa described Jansson as "Leeds' best player in the Championship for the 2018–19 season."

During the 2018–19 Leeds United F.C. season, Jansson played 41 games in all competitions, scoring three goals, with Leeds finishing the regular season in third place after dropping out of the automatic promotion places with three games remaining after a defeat to 10-man Wigan Athletic on 19 April. Leeds qualified for the playoffs, but Jansson picked up an ankle injury and missed the first leg versus sixth-placed Derby County at Pride Park. Leeds took a 0–1 win into the home leg at Elland Road, where Jansson returned to the bench, but was an unused substitute with Gaetano Berardi favoured ahead of him by Bielsa. Leeds lost 2–4 in the encounter, with Leeds down to 10 men after Berardi's red card, and the defeat saw Derby progress to the final against Aston Villa after winning 3–4 on aggregate. (Villa subsequently won the final 2–1 and were promoted.) After the defeat to Derby, Jansson was pictured sitting alone by the pitch in silence, and following the game he posted on his Instagram account that "It shouldn’t end like that, still don’t understand it today how it all could end so quickly."

At the start of the 2019–20 pre-season, Jansson was informed by the club to return to training later than the rest of the first-team squad to give him time to find a new club, as he was no longer in Bielsa's plans for the upcoming season.

=== Brentford ===
On 8 July 2019, Jansson joined Brentford for an undisclosed fee on a three-year contract with the option of a fourth year. He became club captain with the departure of Romaine Sawyers shortly after the Swede's arrival at the club.

He scored his first goals for the club against Watford in the 2021–22 season: the equaliser in a late 2–1 win at home, followed by his second four months later against the same opponent, a 95th-minute 2–1 winner at Vicarage Road, scoring a total of three league goals for the season.

Jansson played only six games of the 2022–23 season before suffering a hamstring injury in a goalless league tie at Bournemouth on 1 October 2022. The injury kept him out until the post-World Cup break, when he was an unused sub against Tottenham Hotspur on Boxing Day and then came on at the London Stadium on 30 December as a 95th-minute replacement for the injured Ivan Toney in the Bees' 2–0 win against West Ham United. He scored his first league goal of the 2022–23 season on 1 April at Brighton & Hove Albion, scoring Brentford's first in a 3–3 "thriller".

=== Return to Malmö FF ===
On 14 April 2023, Brentford announced that Jansson would leave the club at the end of the season, to rejoin Malmö FF on a free transfer. The defender would sign a contract until 2027 with his boyhood team.

== International career ==
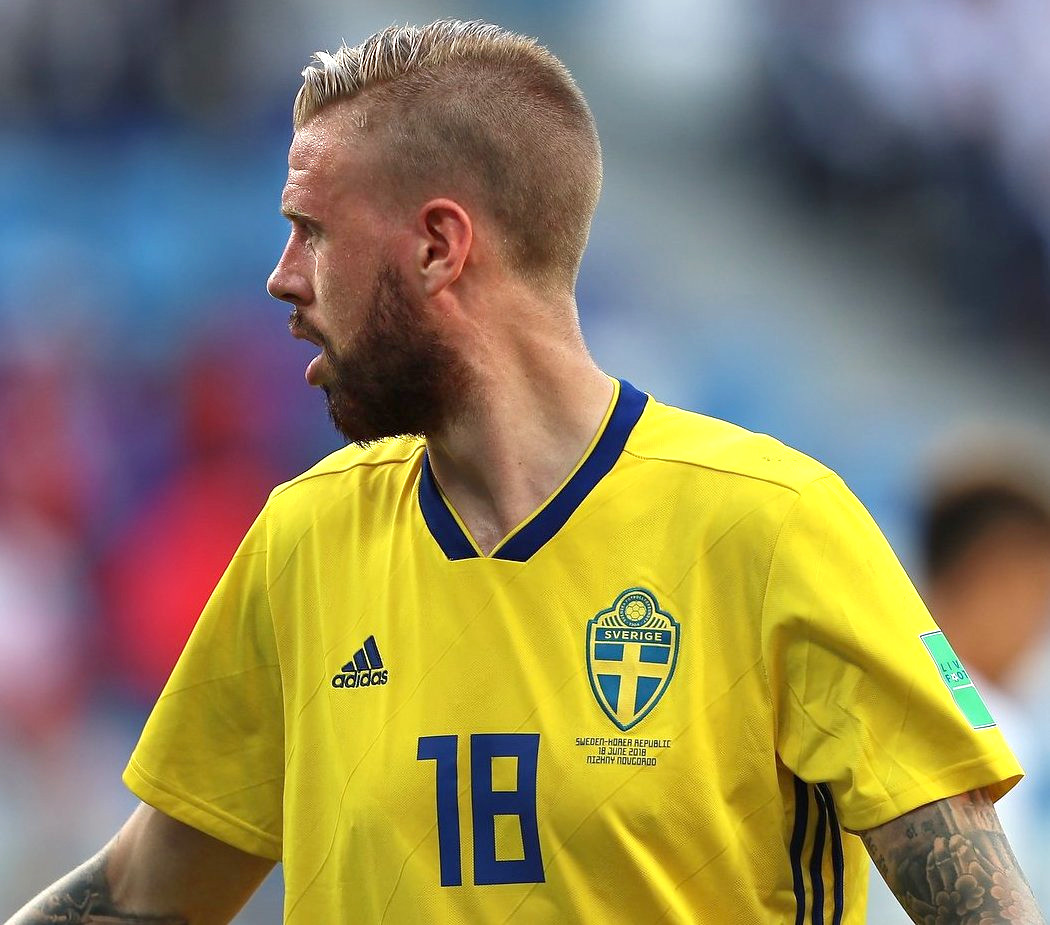
Jansson with Sweden at the 2018 FIFA World Cup

=== Youth ===
Jansson made his debut for the Sweden U21 national team in a friendly game against Portugal on 9 February 2011. On 2 June 2011 he captained the team in a match against Norway where he also scored the first goal in a 4–1 win for Sweden U21.

=== Senior ===
==== Early career, Euro 2016, and captaincy ====
Jansson was selected for the annual training camp for the Sweden national team in January 2012. He made his senior debut for Sweden in the training match against Bahrain on 18 January 2012. During the summer of 2016, Jansson was selected to represent the Sweden squad for UEFA Euro 2016, however he remained an unused substitute for Sweden in all 3 of their games. On 27 March 2018, Jansson was named as the Sweden captain for a friendly match against Romania.

==== 2018 FIFA World Cup ====
On 15 May 2018, Jansson was named in Sweden's final 23-man squad for the 2018 FIFA World Cup. On 18 June, Jansson was named in the starting lineup ahead of Manchester United's Victor Lindelöf for Sweden's opening game of Group F in a 1–0 win against South Korea. Sweden reached the World Cup Quarter-Finals of the tournament after beating Switzerland in the last 16, however England knocked out Sweden in a 2–0 win on 7 July 2018, the match also saw Jansson play in an unfamiliar striker's role, with Jansson brought on as a second-half substitute to try score a goal with Sweden trailing at the time.

==== Later career, Euro 2020, and retirement ====
On 6 September 2018, Jansson was once again named Sweden captain in a 2–0 defeat against Austria. Jansson was included in Sweden's 26-man squad for UEFA Euro 2020, and served as a backup behind Victor Lindelöf, Marcus Danielson, and Filip Helander as Sweden reached the round of 16 before being eliminated by Ukraine.

On 11 August 2021, Jansson announced his retirement from international football at the age of 30. He won a total of 27 caps for the Sweden national team between 2012 and 2021.

== Personal life ==
While at Leeds, Jansson had a popular chant made for him, that begins "Pontus Jansson's magic, he wears a magic hat". The song is a crowd terrace version of the song "My Old Man's a Dustman" originally performed by Lonnie Donegan. On 25 July 2017, Jansson married his fiancée Åsa Thornell and revealed on his Instagram that at their wedding reception they had a band sing a Swedish version of the "magic hat" song. Leeds' fans also used to sing another Jansson chant, to the tune of "Last Christmas" by Wham!: "Last Christmas, I gave you my heart … This year, to save me from tears, I'll give it to Pontus Jansson".

Jansson's agent is former Swedish international and ex-Blackburn Rovers striker Martin Dahlin.

In August 2019, Jansson featured in Leeds United documentary Take Us Home documenting the 2018–19 season on Amazon Prime; the documentary was narrated by Academy Award winning actor and Leeds United fan Russell Crowe.

== Career statistics ==
=== Club ===
As of match played 18 April 2026

Appearances and goals by club, season and competition
| Club | Season | League | | | National cup | | League cup | | Continental | | Other | | Total | |
| Club | Season | Division | Apps | Goals | Apps | Goals | Apps | Goals | Apps | Goals | Apps | Goals | Apps | Goals |
|---|---|---|---|---|---|---|---|---|---|---|---|---|---|---|
| Malmö FF | 2009 | Allsvenskan | 2 | 0 | 0 | 0 | — | | — | | — | | 2 | 0 |
| Malmö FF | 2010 | Allsvenskan | 18 | 1 | 2 | 0 | — | | — | | — | | 20 | 1 |
| Malmö FF | 2011 | Allsvenskan | 15 | 2 | 2 | 0 | — | | 11 (Note: Six appearances and one goal in UEFA Champions League, five appearances in UEFA Europa League) | 1 | — | | 28 | 3 |
| Malmö FF | 2012 | Allsvenskan | 30 | 1 | 0 | 0 | — | | — | | — | | 30 | 1 |
| Malmö FF | 2013 | Allsvenskan | 24 | 1 | 2 | 0 | — | | 6 (Note: Appearances in UEFA Europa League) | 0 | 1 (Note: Appearance in Svenska Supercupen) | 0 | 33 | 1 |
| Malmö FF | 2014 | Allsvenskan | 9 | 1 | 6 | 0 | — | | 0 | 0 | — | | 15 | 1 |
| Malmö FF | Total | | 98 | 6 | 12 | 0 | 0 | 0 | 17 | 1 | 1 | 0 | 128 | 7 |
| IFK Malmö (loan) | 2009 | Division 2 Södra Götaland | 8 | 4 | — | | — | | — | | — | | 8 | 4 |
| Torino | 2014–15 | Serie A | 9 | 0 | 1 | 0 | — | | 6 | 0 | — | | 16 | 0 |
| Torino | 2015–16 | Serie A | 7 | 1 | 2 | 0 | — | | — | | — | | 9 | 1 |
| Torino | Total | | 16 | 1 | 3 | 0 | — | | 6 | 0 | — | | 25 | 1 |
| Leeds United (loan) | 2016–17 | Championship | 34 | 3 | 1 | 0 | 1 | 0 | — | | — | | 36 | 3 |
| Leeds United | 2017–18 | Championship | 42 | 3 | 0 | 0 | 1 | 0 | — | | — | | 43 | 3 |
| Leeds United | 2018–19 | Championship | 39 | 3 | 0 | 0 | 2 | 0 | — | | 0 | 0 | 41 | 3 |
| Leeds United | Total | | 81 | 6 | 0 | 0 | 3 | 0 | — | | 0 | 0 | 84 | 6 |
| Brentford | 2019–20 | Championship | 34 | 0 | 0 | 0 | 0 | 0 | — | | 3 (Note: Appearances in EFL Championship play-offs) | 0 | 37 | 0 |
| Brentford | 2020–21 | Championship | 24 | 0 | 0 | 0 | 0 | 0 | — | | 3 | 0 | 27 | 0 |
| Brentford | 2021–22 | Premier League | 37 | 3 | 1 | 0 | 1 | 0 | — | | — | | 39 | 3 |
| Brentford | 2022–23 | Premier League | 12 | 1 | 0 | 0 | 0 | 0 | — | | — | | 12 | 1 |
| Brentford | Total | | 107 | 4 | 1 | 0 | 1 | 0 | — | | 6 | 0 | 115 | 4 |
| Malmö FF | 2023 | Allsvenskan | 15 | 1 | 0 | 0 | — | | — | | — | | 15 | 1 |
| Malmö FF | 2024 | Allsvenskan | 26 | 1 | 5 | 1 | — | | 10 (Note: Six appearances and one goal in UEFA Champions League, four appearances in UEFA Europa League) | 1 | — | | 41 | 3 |
| Malmö FF | 2025 | Allsvenskan | 17 | 2 | 4 | 1 | — | | 14 (Note: Six appearances and two goals in UEFA Champions League, eight appearances in UEFA Europa League) | 2 | — | | 35 | 5 |
| Malmö FF | 2026 | Allsvenskan | 3 | 1 | 4 | 0 | — | | 1 (Note: Appearance in UEFA Europa League) | 0 | — | | 8 | 1 |
| Malmö FF | Total | | 61 | 5 | 13 | 2 | — | | 25 | 3 | — | | 99 | 10 |
| Career total | | | 410 | 29 | 30 | 2 | 5 | 0 | 48 | 4 | 7 | 0 | 500 | 35 |

=== International ===
Appearances and goals by national team and year
| National team | Year | Apps | Goals |
|---|---|---|---|
| Sweden | 2012 | 2 | 0 |
| Sweden | 2013 | 2 | 0 |
| Sweden | 2014 | 3 | 0 |
| Sweden | 2015 | 0 | 0 |
| Sweden | 2016 | 3 | 0 |
| Sweden | 2017 | 3 | 0 |
| Sweden | 2018 | 7 | 0 |
| Sweden | 2019 | 3 | 0 |
| Sweden | 2020 | 4 | 0 |
| Total | | 27 | 0 |

== Honours ==
Brentford

- EFL Championship play-offs: 2021

Individual

- EFL Team of the Season: 2016–17
- EFL Championship Team of the Season: 2016–17
- PFA Team of the Year: 2018–19 Championship
