= Filip Stenström =

Swedish footballer

Personal information
- Full name: Filip Stenström
- Date of birth: 3 July 1991 (age 35)
- Place of birth: Sweden
- Height: 1.75 m (5 ft 9 in)
- Positions: Defender; wingback

Youth career
- –2007: Gideonsbergs IF
- 2007–2008: Västerås SK

Senior career*
Years	Team	Apps	(Gls)
2009	Västerås SK	11	(0)
2009–2013	Malmö FF	4	(0)
2011	→ IF Limhamn Bunkeflo (loan)	2	(0)
2013	→ Ängelholms FF (loan)	12	(0)
2013–2014	Ängelholms FF	8	(0)

International career^{‡}
2006–2008	Sweden U17	19	(0)
2009–2010	Sweden U19	6	(0)
- * Club domestic league appearances and goals as of 7 August 2013 ‡ National team caps and goals as of 12 December 2012

Filip Rubensson, formerly Stenström (born 3 July 1991) is a Swedish former footballer. He played as a defender.

== Club career ==
=== Malmö FF ===
Rubensson made his Allsvenskan debut in a match against IFK Norrköping on 3 July 2011.

== Career statistics ==
As of 7 August 2013.

Club	Season	League		Cup		Continental		Total	
Club	Season	Apps	Goals	Apps	Goals	Apps	Goals	Apps	Goals
Västerås SK	2009	11	0	0	0	—		11	0
Västerås SK	Total	11	0	0	0	—		11	0
Malmö FF	2009	0	0	0	0	—		0	0
Malmö FF	2010	0	0	0	0	—		0	0
Malmö FF	2011	3	0	0	0	1	0	4	0
IF Limhamn Bunkeflo	2011	2	0	0	0	—		2	0
IF Limhamn Bunkeflo	Total	2	0	0	0	—		2	0
Malmö FF	2012	1	0	0	0	—		1	0
Malmö FF	Total	4	0	0	0	1	0	5	0
Ängelholms FF	2013	13	0	2	0	—		15	0
Ängelholms FF	Total	13	0	2	0	0	0	15	0
Career total		30	0	2	0	1	0	33	0

== Personal life ==
In 2018, Rubensson married fellow footballer Elin Rubensson and took her surname.
