= Jimmy Durmaz =

Swedish footballer (born 1989)

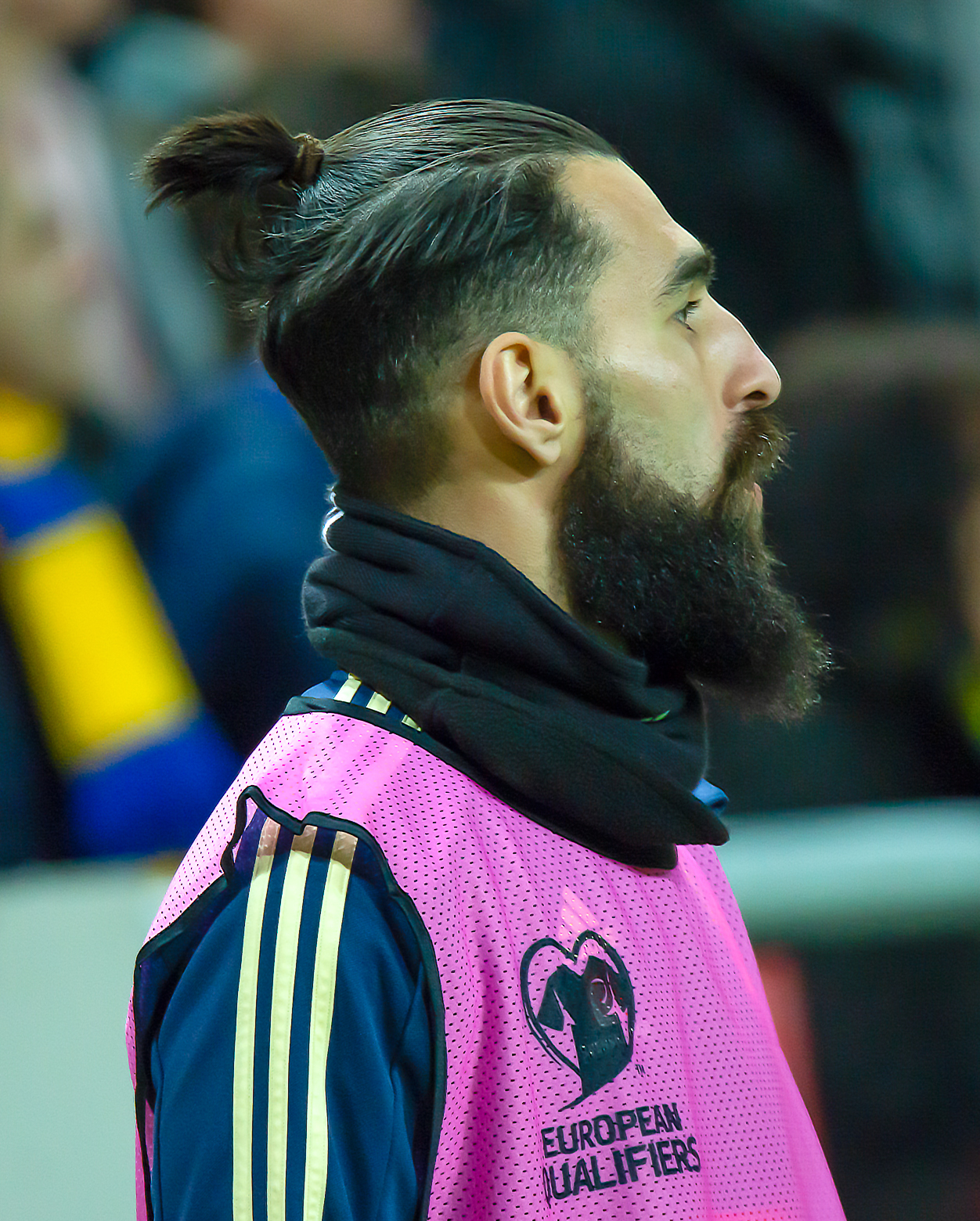
- Durmaz with Sweden in 2019

Personal information
- Full name: Jakup Jimmy Durmaz
- Birth name: Jakup Jimmy Touma
- Date of birth: 22 March 1989 (age 37)
- Place of birth: Örebro, Sweden
- Height: 1.80 m (5 ft 11 in)
- Position: Midfielder

Team information
- Current team: Östertälje FC

Youth career
- 2001–2005: BK Forward

Senior career*
Years	Team	Apps	(Gls)
2005–2008	BK Forward	35	(4)
2008–2012	Malmö FF	91	(14)
2012–2014	Gençlerbirliği	61	(11)
2014–2016	Olympiacos	43	(9)
2016–2019	Toulouse	83	(9)
2019–2021	Galatasaray	12	(0)
2020–2021	→ Fatih Karagümrük (loan)	29	(3)
2021–2022	Fatih Karagümrük	45	(1)
2023	AIK	19	(0)
2024	Gençlerbirliği	12	(0)
2025	Etimesgutspor	8	(0)
2026–	Östertälje FC		

International career
2009–2010	Sweden U21	8	(0)
2011–2019	Sweden	49	(3)
- * Club domestic league appearances and goals

Jakup Jimmy Durmaz (né Touma; born 22 March 1989) is a Swedish professional footballer who plays as a midfielder for Swedish club Östertälje FC.

He began his career at BK Forward and moved in 2008 to Malmö FF, where he won the Allsvenskan title in 2010. He had two seasons each with Gençlerbirliği of Turkey and Olympiacos of Greece, winning two Super League Greece titles and one Greek Football Cup.

A full international between 2011 and 2019, Durmaz won 49 caps for Sweden and scored three times. He was part of their squads for UEFA Euro 2016 and the 2018 FIFA World Cup.

== Early life ==
Durmaz was born in Örebro, Sweden, into an Assyrian family of the Syriac Orthodox faith. His father, Semun, is from Midyat, Turkey while his mother, Joula, is from Beirut, Lebanon. They emigrated to Sweden from Lebanon during the Lebanese Civil War.

Durmaz previously had his mother's surname, Touma, before changing it to his father's surname, Durmaz, in 2009.

== Club career ==
=== Malmö FF ===
Durmaz came to Malmö FF from BK Forward in July 2008. He made his Allsvenskan debut on 14 July 2008 against Hammarby IF.

His breakthrough came in the 2010 league winning season when he started in 15 games and played 27. Durmaz scored the opening goal against AC Milan in an exhibition game on 14 August 2011. Durmaz continued to the play regularly for the club during the 2011 season and finished the season with 27 league matches played and four goals scored.

=== Gençlerbirliği ===
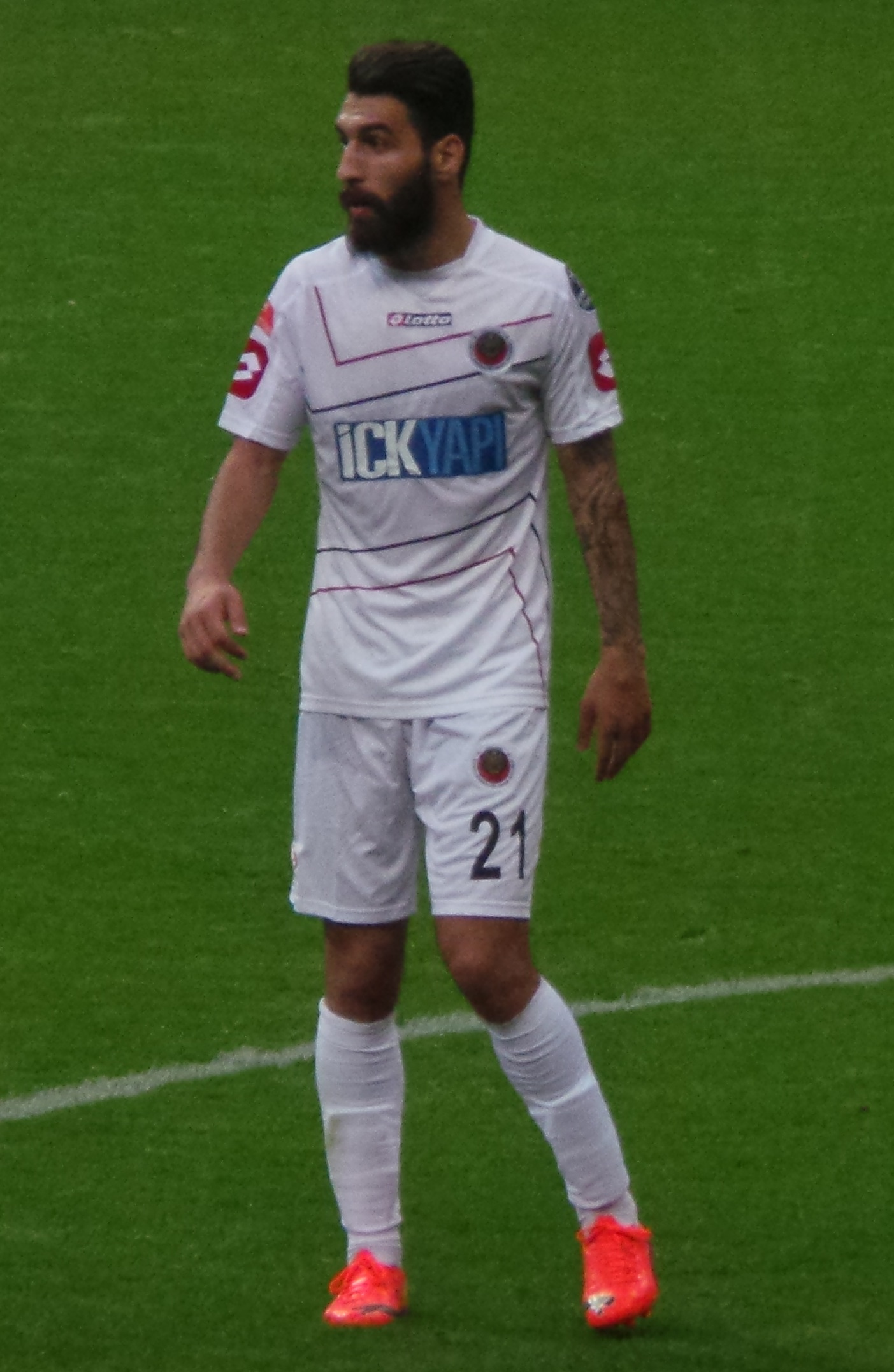
Jimmy Durmaz with Gençlerbirliği S.K. in 2014

In June 2012, Durmaz signed a three-year contract with Turkish club Gençlerbirliği S.K. During his time with the Ankara based side as a domestic player in Turkey. Durmaz scored 11 times and provided six assists in 61 league appearances.

=== Olympiacos ===
After two seasons in Turkey, Durmaz signed for Greek Super League club Olympiacos Durmaz in August 2014. He scored his first goal for the club with a close-range effort against OFI on 14 September. His first hat-trick came in an 8–0 win over Tyrnavos in a Greek Cup game on 29 January 2015.

=== Toulouse ===
Durmaz moved to Ligue 1 club Toulouse in August 2016, for a fee in the region of €2.5 million. On 26 August 2017, Durmaz scored two goals (both of them penalties) in Toulouse's 3–2 Ligue 1 home win over Stade Rennais to bring his 2017–18 Ligue 1 goal tally to three and improve on the two Ligue 1 goals he scored in the whole of the 2016–17 Ligue 1 season.

=== Galatasaray ===
On 2 July 2019, Durmaz joined reigning Süper Lig champions Galatasaray on a free transfer after his contract with Toulouse ran out. He signed on a three-year deal, earning 6 million Turkish lira for the first season, increasing by a million in each subsequent campaign.

Durmaz made his debut for the club in the Turkish Super Cup on 7 August 2019, playing 81 minutes in their 1–0 win over Akhisar.

=== Fatih Karagümrük ===
On 2 October 2020, he loaned from Galatasaray to Fatih Karagümrük, one of the Super League teams. On 4 August 2021, he signed permanent contract with the team for following two seasons.

=== AIK ===
On 12 January 2023, Durmaz signed a contract with AIK that will run until 31 December 2024.

=== Return to Gençlerbirliği ===
In January 2024, Durmaz returned to former club Gençlerbirliği on an eighteen-month contract.

=== Östertälje FC ===
Despite having announced his retirement from football in February 2026, Durmaz signed for Division 6 side Östertälje FC in March 2026.

== International career ==
Durmaz made his debut for Sweden on 8 February 2011 in a friendly game against Cyprus. Durmaz was selected for the annual training camp for the Sweden national team in January 2012. The squad selection for the camp traditionally feature the best Swedish players in domestic and other Scandinavian leagues.

Durmaz represented Sweden at Euro 2016.

He was named in Sweden's 23-man squad for the 2018 FIFA World Cup in Russia, but only made one appearance in the tournament, coming on as a substitute against Germany in the group stage. After conceding a last-minute free kick in the game, from which Toni Kroos scored to beat Sweden 2–1, Durmaz was subjected to racial abuse and threats of violence on social media. Expert analysis found that the most abusive posts were almost all bot generated, rather than from genuine users.

== Personal life ==
Durmaz's younger brother, Elias, is also a footballer. He is related to footballers Sharbel Touma, David Durmaz, and Charbel Georges.

== Career statistics ==
=== Club ===
As of match played 6 August 2023

Appearances and goals by club, season and competition
Club	Season	League			Cup (Note: Includes Svenska Cupen, Turkish Cup, Greek Football Cup and Coupe de France)		Continental		Other		Total	
Club	Season	Division	Apps	Goals	Apps	Goals	Apps	Goals	Apps	Goals	Apps	Goals
BK Forward	2005	Division 2 Norra Svealand	0	0	0	0	—		—		0	0
BK Forward	2006	Division 1 Norra	0	0	0	0	—		—		0	0
BK Forward	2007	Division 1 Norra	22	2	0	0	—		—		22	2
BK Forward	2008	Division 1 Norra	13	2	0	0	—		—		13	2
BK Forward	Total		35	4	0	0	—		—		35	4
Malmö FF	2008	Allsvenskan	9	2	0	0	—		—		9	2
Malmö FF	2009	Allsvenskan	13	0	1	0	—		—		14	0
Malmö FF	2010	Allsvenskan	27	2	2	0	—		—		29	2
Malmö FF	2011	Allsvenskan	27	4	3	0	12 (Note: Six appearances in UEFA Champions League, six appearances in UEFA Europa League)	0	—		42	4
Malmö FF	2012	Allsvenskan	15	6	0	0	—		—		15	6
Malmö FF	Total		91	14	6	0	12	0	—		109	14
Gençlerbirliği	2012–13	Süper Lig	29	5	3	0	—		—		32	5
Gençlerbirliği	2013–14	Süper Lig	32	6	1	0	—		—		33	6
Gençlerbirliği	Total		61	11	4	0	—		—		65	11
Olympiacos	2014–15	Super League Greece	19	2	5	3	3 (Note: One appearance in UEFA Champions League, two appearances in UEFA Europa League)	0	—		27	5
Olympiacos	2015–16	Super League Greece	24	7	2	0	2 (Note: Appearances in UEFA Europa League)	0	—		28	7
Olympiacos	2016–17	Super League Greece	0	0	0	0	2 (Note: One appearance in UEFA Champions League, one appearance in UEFA Europa League)	0	—		2	0
Olympiacos	Total		43	9	7	3	7	0	—		57	12
Toulouse	2016–17	Ligue 1	27	2	1	1	—		—		28	3
Toulouse	2017–18	Ligue 1	20	3	3	0	—		2 (Note: Appearances in Coupe de la Ligue)	1	25	4
Toulouse	2018–19	Ligue 1	36	4	1	0	—		—		37	4
Toulouse	Total		83	9	5	1	—		2	1	90	11
Galatasaray	2019–20	Süper Lig	11	0	3	0	0	0	1 (Note: Appearances in Turkish Super Cup)	0	15	0
Galatasaray	2020–21	Süper Lig	1	0	0	0	1 (Note: Appearances in UEFA Europa League)	0	0	0	2	0
Galatasaray	Total		12	0	3	0	1	0	1	0	17	0
Fatih Karagümrük (loan)	2020–21	Süper Lig	30	3	2	0	0	0	0	0	32	3
Fatih Karagümrük	2021–22	Süper Lig	32	1	2	0	0	0	0	0	34	1
Fatih Karagümrük	2022–23	Süper Lig	13	0	0	0	0	0	0	0	13	0
Fatih Karagümrük	Total		75	4	4	0	0	0	0	0	79	3
AIK	2023	Allsvenskan	14	0	4	0	0	0	0	0	18	0
AIK	Total		14	0	4	0	0	0	0	0	18	0
Career total			414	50	31	4	20	0	3	1	480	56

=== International ===
As of 5 September 2019

Appearances and goals by national team and year

National team	Year	Apps	Goals
Sweden
Sweden	2011	1	0
Sweden	2012	2	1
Sweden	2013	11	0
Sweden	2014	9	1
Sweden	2015	5	0
Sweden	2016	10 (Note: Two appearances in UEFA Euro 2016)	0
Sweden	2017	5	1
Sweden	2018	5 (Note: One appearance in 2018 FIFA World Cup)	0
Sweden	2019	1	0
Total		49	3

Scores and results list Sweden's goal tally first

#	Date	Venue	Opponent	Score	Result	Competition
1	23 January 2012	Jassim Bin Hamad Stadium, Doha, Qatar	Qatar	1–0	5–0	Friendly
2	12 October 2014	Friends Arena, Stockholm, Sweden	Liechtenstein	2–0	2–0	UEFA Euro 2016 qualifying
3	9 June 2017	Friends Arena, Stockholm, Sweden	France	1–1	2–1	2018 FIFA World Cup qualification

== Honours ==
Malmö

- Allsvenskan: 2010

Olympiacos

- Super League Greece: 2014–15, 2015–16
- Greek Cup: 2014–15

Galatasaray

- Turkish Super Cup: 2019

Individual

- Stor Grabb: 2016
