= Tobias Lewicki =

Swedish footballer

Personal information
- Full name: Fredrik Tobias Lewicki
- Date of birth: 2 May 1993 (age 33)
- Place of birth: Sweden
- Height: 1.76 m (5 ft 9 in)
- Position: Midfielder

Youth career
- –2003: Bunkeflo IF
- 2004–2011: Malmö FF

Senior career*
Years	Team	Apps	(Gls)
2012	Malmö FF	1	(0)
2012	Trelleborgs FF	3	(0)
2013	LB07	19	(4)
2014–2015	Lunds BK	36	(6)
2017–2020	Limhamns FF	50	(67)

International career^{‡}
2009–2010	Sweden U17	14	(1)
2011	Sweden U19	2	(0)
- * Club domestic league appearances and goals as of 1 August 2016 ‡ National team caps and goals as of 5 April 2012

Fredrik Tobias Lewicki (born 2 May 1993) is a Swedish former footballer who played as a midfielder.

== Club career ==
Lewicki played his first and only Allsvenskan match for Malmö FF against Gefle IF on 2 April 2012. Lewicki was demoted to Malmö FF's youth team in early July 2012 and it was later announced that he had been sold to Trelleborgs FF in Sweden's second tier, Superettan.

== Career statistics ==
As of 2 April 2012

Club performance			League		Cup		Continental		Total	
Season	Club	League	Apps	Goals	Apps	Goals	Apps	Goals	Apps	Goals
Sweden			League		Svenska Cupen		Europe		Total	
2012	Malmö FF	Allsvenskan	1	0	0	0	—		1	0
2012	Trelleborgs FF	Superettan	2	0	0	0	—		2	0
Total	Sweden		3	0	0	0	0	0	3	0
Career total			3	0	0	0	0	0	3	0

== Personal life ==
Born in Sweden. His cousin, Oscar Lewicki, is a professional footballer who plays for Malmö FF.
