= Tobias Malm =

Swedish footballer

Personal information
- Date of birth: 21 January 1992 (age 34)
- Place of birth: Sweden
- Height: 1.82 m (6 ft 0 in)
- Position: Wingback

Team information
- Current team: Vinberg
- Number: 9

Youth career
- 2002–2010: Malmö FF

Senior career*
Years	Team	Apps	(Gls)
2011–2014	Malmö FF	6	(0)
2012	→ Trelleborgs FF (loan)	23	(1)
2013	→ Landskrona BoIS (loan)	14	(0)
2014	→ Östersunds FK (loan)	13	(0)
2015	Lunds BK	21	(0)
2016	FC Höllviken	22	(0)
2017	Prespa Birlik	22	(3)
2018	Tvååker	25	(2)
2019–	Vinberg	56	(3)

International career^{‡}
2011	Sweden U19	1	(0)
2013	Sweden U21	1	(0)
- * Club domestic league appearances and goals as of 3 April 2022 ‡ National team caps and goals as of 5 February 2013

Tobias Malm (born 21 January 1992) is a Swedish footballer who plays for Vinberg as a defender.

== Club career ==
=== Malmö FF ===
Malm made his Allsvenskan debut in a match against IF Elfsborg on 24 April 2011. He scored the 2–1 goal against AC Milan in an exhibition game in August 2011, he played the game as left midfielder.

=== Loan periods ===
Malm was loaned to newly relegated Trelleborgs FF for the duration of the 2012 season. Malm played 23 matches out of 30 and scored one goal in 2012 Superettan for Trelleborg. At the end of the season Trelleborg was relegated once again.

It was announced on 19 December 2012 that Malm would be on loan to Superettan side Landskrona BoIS for the duration of the 2013 season. In total Malm played 14 league matches during this loan spell. For the 2014 season Malm was sent on loan to Superettan club Östersunds FK

== Career statistics ==
As of 2 November 2014.

Club	Season	League		Cup		Continental		Total	
Club	Season	Apps	Goals	Apps	Goals	Apps	Goals	Apps	Goals
Malmö FF	2011	6	0	1	0	2	0	9	0
Malmö FF	Total	6	0	1	0	2	0	9	0
Trelleborgs FF	2012	23	1	0	0	—		23	1
Trelleborgs FF	Total	23	1	0	0	—		23	1
Landskrona BoIS	2013	14	0	2	0	—		16	0
Landskrona BoIS	Total	14	0	2	0	—		16	0
Östersunds FK	2014	13	0	0	0	—		13	0
Östersunds FK	Total	13	0	0	0	—		13	0
Career total		56	1	3	0	2	0	61	1
