= Mats Engqvist =

Swedish football coach

Mats Engqvist is a football coach from Sweden. He is currently the head coach of the youth academy at Malmö FF. Before his appointment to the coach job Engqvist had been active within the club as one of the directors of the club's new stadium inaugurated in 2009, Swedbank Stadion.

Engqvist has been active within Swedish football for a long time as board secretary for the Swedish Football Association as well as being responsible for several youth projects.
