= Ulrich Vinzents =

Danish footballer (born 1976)

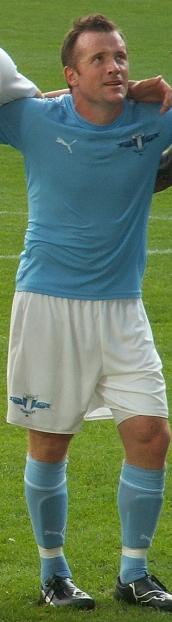
- Vinzents playing for Malmö FF in 2010

Personal information
- Full name: Ulrich Vig Vinzents
- Date of birth: 4 November 1976 (age 49)
- Place of birth: Ringsted, Denmark
- Height: 1.76 m (5 ft 9 in)
- Position: Right-back

Senior career*
Years	Team	Apps	(Gls)
1994–1995	Lyngby Boldklub	3	(0)
1995–1998	Køge BK	73	(4)
1998–2001	Lyngby Boldklub	93	(1)
2001–2004	FC Nordsjælland	76	(1)
2004–2006	OB	53	(2)
2006–2012	Malmö FF	166	(0)
2013–2016	Ringsted IF		

International career
1996–1997	Denmark U21	6	(0)
- * Club domestic league appearances and goals as of 25 April 2017

Ulrich Vig Vinzents (born 4 November 1976) is a Danish former professional footballer who played as a right-back.

== Club career ==
=== In Denmark ===
Born in Ringsted, Vinzents started his professional career at Lyngby Boldklub however with a limited amount of play. He moved on to Køge BK and played there for three seasons before coming back to his old club Lyngby. Back in Lyngby Vinzents established himself in the starting eleven and played for four seasons before once again leaving the club, this time to FC Nordsjælland. After a couple of season's at the club he transferred to OB for three seasons before he moved overseas to Sweden and Malmö FF.

=== Malmö FF ===
Vinzents transferred to Malmö FF in 2006 and took a spot in the starting eleven from the start. For the coming five seasons he missed as few as seven games as he was in good form and rid of injuries. For the 2010 season Vinzents showed that he had a good defense as well as offensive skills which he demonstrated frequently by shooting cross balls from the right flank. In 2010 Vinzents finally won his first title as Malmö FF became Swedish champions. Vinzents played 29 out of 30 possible league games and was one of the reasons for the team's successful defence.

Vinzents continued to play for the majority of Malmö FF's matches for the 2011 season with 23 Allsvenskan caps and 45 matches in total. He scored his first and only competitive goal for the club against Jönköpings Södra IF in Svenska Cupen on 11 May 2011. Vinzents signed a new contract on 22 June 2011 to keep him at the club for another season.

After captain Daniel Andersson decided to focus on his coaching role for the 2012 season Vinzents was given the captain's armband. However as Vinzents had some trouble with injuries throughout the season he only acted as captain for a few matches, most notably in his last match for Malmö FF on 4 November in an away game against AIK. On 1 November 2012, it was announced that Vinzents would leave the club after seven seasons. He was given a farewell ceremony on the pitch at Swedbank Stadion after the last home match of the season against Örebro SK.

== Career statistics ==
As of 4 November 2012

Appearances and goals by club, season and competition
Club	Season	League			Cup (Note: Includes Danish Cup, Svenska Cupen)		Continental		Total	
Club	Season	Division	Apps	Goals	Apps	Goals	Apps	Goals	Apps	Goals
Lyngby Boldklub	1994–95	Danish Superliga	3	0	—		—		3	0
Køge BK	1995–96	Danish 1st Division	26	1	—		—		26	1
Køge BK	1996–97	Danish 1st Division	23	2	—		—		23	2
Køge BK	1997–98	Danish 1st Division	13	0	—		—		13	0
Køge BK	1998–99	Danish 1st Division	11	1	—		—		11	1
Køge BK	Total		73	4	0	0	0	0	73	4
Lyngby Boldklub	1998–99	Danish Superliga	19	0	—		—		19	0
Lyngby Boldklub	1999–00	Danish Superliga	31	1	—		—		31	1
Lyngby Boldklub	2000–01	Danish Superliga	26	0	—		—		26	0
Lyngby Boldklub	2001–02	Danish Superliga	17	0	—		—		17	0
Lyngby Boldklub	Total		93	1	0	0	0	0	93	1
FC Nordsjælland	2001–02	1st Division	13	1	—		—		13	1
FC Nordsjælland	2002–03	Danish Superliga	31	0	—		—		31	0
FC Nordsjælland	2003–04	Danish Superliga	32	0	—		—		32	0
FC Nordsjælland	Total		76	1	0	0	0	0	76	1
OB	2004–05	Danish Superliga	33	1	—		—		33	1
OB	2005–06	Danish Superliga	20	1	—		—		20	1
OB	Total		53	2	0	0	0	0	53	2
Malmö FF	2006	Allsvenskan	26	0	1	0	–		27	0
Malmö FF	2007	Allsvenskan	25	0	2	0	—		27	0
Malmö FF	2008	Allsvenskan	29	0	2	0	—		31	0
Malmö FF	2009	Allsvenskan	26	0	0	0	—		26	0
Malmö FF	2010	Allsvenskan	29	0	2	0	—		31	0
Malmö FF	2011	Allsvenskan	23	0	3	1	8	0	34	1
Malmö FF	2012	Allsvenskan	8	0	0	0	—		8	0
Malmö FF	Total		166	0	10	1	8	0	183	1
Career total			464	8	10	1	8	0	482	9

== Honours ==
Malmö FF

- Allsvenskan: 2010
