= IF Limhamn Bunkeflo (men) =

Association football club

- Full name: Idrottsföreningen Limhamn Bunkeflo 2007
- Nickname: LB07
- Founded: 1 January 2008; 18 years ago
- Ground: Limhamns IP, Malmö
- Capacity: 2,800
- Chairman: Johan Andersson
- Manager: Tommy Ringblom
- League: Division 2 Västra Götaland
Home colours	Away colours

IF Limhamn Bunkeflo 2007, also known simply as LB07, are a Swedish football club based in Malmö. The club is affiliated with Skånes Fotbollförbund and play their home games at Limhamns IP. The club colours, reflected in their crest and kit, are red and white. Formed on 1 January 2008, the club has played one season in Sweden's second-tier league Superettan and three seasons in the third-tier league Division 1 Södra. The club is currently playing in Division 3, the fifth tier of the Swedish football league system, where the season lasts from April to October.

== History ==
They were officially formed on 1 January 2008, when Superettan team Bunkeflo IF merged with Limhamns IF. The newly merged team took Bunkeflo's place in the league and were relegated to the Division 1 Södra in December 2008.

== Season to season ==
Season	Level	Division	Section	Position	Movements
2008	Tier 2	Superettan		13th	Relegation Playoffs — Relegated
2009	Tier 3	Division 1	Södra	5th	
2010	Tier 3	Division 1	Södra	7th	
2011	Tier 3	Division 1	Södra	10th	
2012	Tier 3	Division 1	Södra	11th	
2013	Tier 3	Division 1	Södra	13th	Relegated
2014	Tier 4	Division 2	Östra Götaland	14th	Relegated
2015	Tier 5	Division 3	Södra Götaland	12th	Relegated
2016	Tier 6	Division 4	Skåne Sydvästra	4th	
2017	Tier 6	Division 4	Skåne Sydvästra	1st	Promoted
2018	Tier 5	Division 3	Södra Götaland	2nd	
2019	Tier 5	Division 3	Södra Götaland	1st	Promoted

== Attendances ==
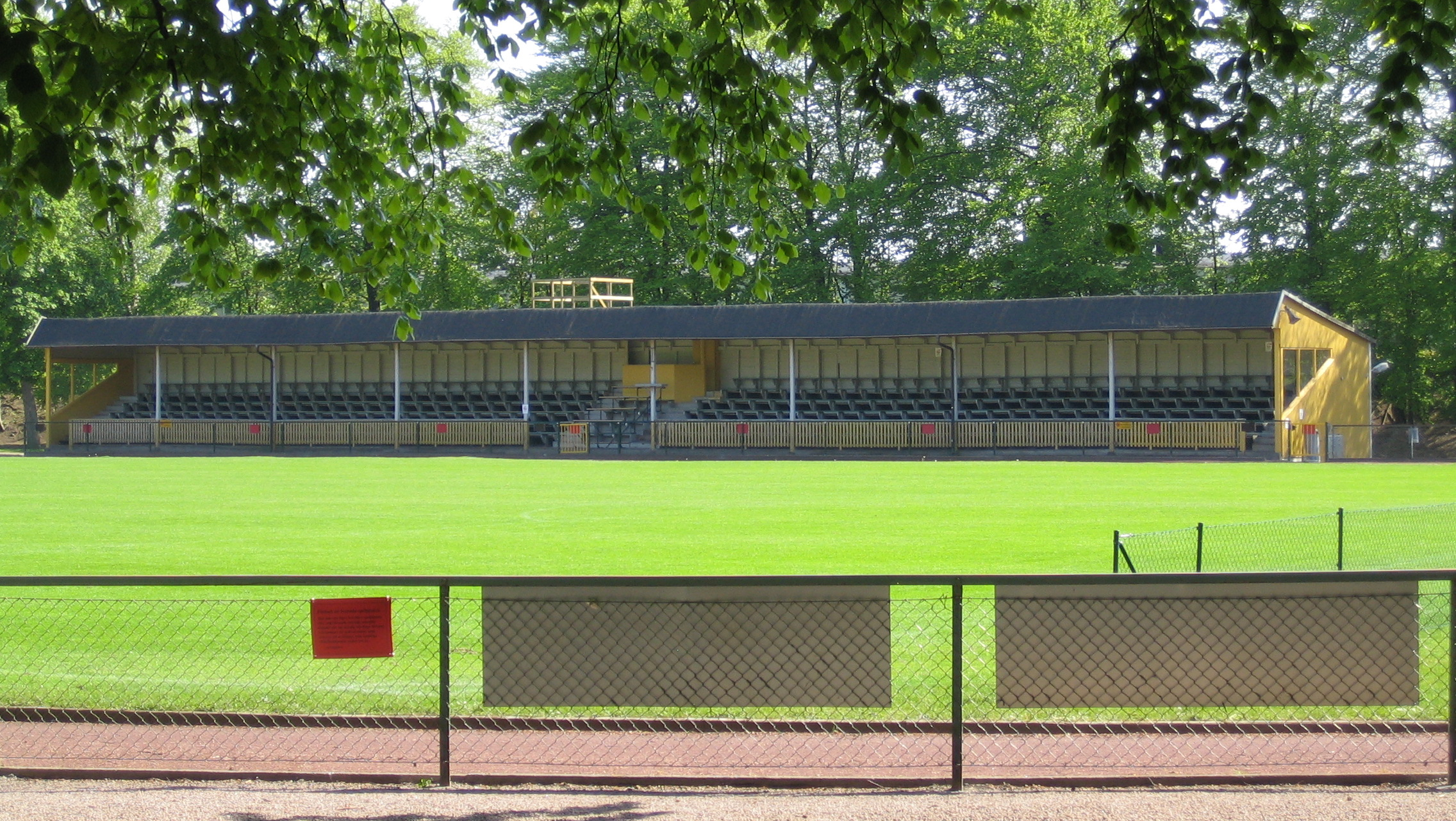
Limhamns IP

In recent seasons, IF Limhamn Bunkeflo had the following average attendances.

Season	Average attendance	Division / Section	Level
2008	925	Superettan	Nivå 2
2009	469	Div 1 Södra	Nivå 3
2010	470	Div 1 Södra	Nivå 3

* Attendances are provided in the Publikliga sections of the Svenska Fotbollförbundet website.

== Current squad ==
As of 3 August 2025

Note: Flags indicate national team as defined under FIFA eligibility rules; some limited exceptions apply. Players may hold more than one non-FIFA nationality.

No.	Pos.	Nation	Player
1	GK	SWE	Edwin Hansson
2	DF	SWE	Francis Mensah
3	DF	SWE	Patchicco Diallo
4	DF	SWE	Jacob Stern
5	DF	SWE	Hannes Frick Sahlheden
7	DF	SWE	Jason Rindom
8	MF	SWE	Hugo Löfgren
11	FW	SWE	Jonathan Ahlbäck Ikonen
12	FW	SWE	John Ebere Ekeh
14	MF	SWE	Johan Martinsson
15	MF	SWE	Jakob Wallin

No.	Pos.	Nation	Player
16	DF	SWE	Emil Ohlsson
17	MF	SWE	Nechervan Shamo
18	FW	SWE	Theo Andersson
20	MF	SWE	Hannes Herrström
21	MF	SWE	Gustav Nordström
22	DF	SWE	Arvid Molin
24	FW	SWE	Elis Brandqvist
25	DF	SWE	Clifford Rindom
26	GK	SWE	Rasmus Johansen
34	MF	SWE	Lassine Traore

== Technical staff ==
As of 3 August 2025

Name	Role
(Sweden) Jim Gustafsson	Manager
(Sweden) Andreas Engler Ludviksson	Goalkeeping Coach

== Notable former players ==
- (Sweden) Robin Olsen
- (Iran) Saman Ghoddos
- (Sweden) Mattias Svanberg
- (Sweden) Melker Widell
- (Sweden) Nils Zätterström
