= 2009 Malmö FF season =

Malmö FF
2009 season
- Chairman: Bengt Madsen
- Manager: Roland Nilsson
- Stadium: Swedbank Stadion
- Allsvenskan: 7th
- Svenska Cupen: Round 3
- Top goalscorer: League: Daniel Larsson (11); All: Edward Ofere (15)
- Highest home attendance: 23,347 (13 April vs Örgryte IS, Allsvenskan)
- Lowest home attendance: 9,295 (1 November vs IF Brommapojkarna, Allsvenskan)
- Average home league attendance: 14,815
Home colours	Away colours

The 2009 season was Malmö FF's 98th in existence, their 74th season in Allsvenskan and their 9th consecutive season in the league. They competed in Allsvenskan where they finished in 7th position and Svenska Cupen where they were knocked out in the third round. The season was the club's first at Swedbank Stadion, having moved from Malmö Stadion after the 2008 season. The first league match at Swedbank Stadion was played against Örgryte IS on 13 April and won 3–0 by Malmö FF.

== Players ==
=== Squad ===
Note: Flags indicate national team as defined under FIFA eligibility rules; some limited exceptions apply. Players may hold more than one non-FIFA nationality.

No.	Pos.	Nation	Player
1	GK	SWE	Jonas Sandqvist
2	DF	DEN	Ulrich Vinzents
3	MF	SWE	Robert Åhman-Persson
4	DF	LBR	Jimmy Dixon
5	DF	BRA	Gabriel
6	DF	FIN	Markus Halsti
7	FW	SWE	Daniel Larsson
8	MF	SWE	Daniel Andersson (Captain)
9	FW	BRA	Wilton Figueiredo
10	MF	NED	Rick Kruys
11	MF	SWE	Jeffrey Aubynn
13	MF	SWE	Babis Stefanidis
14	FW	SWE	Guillermo Molins
15	DF	SWE	David Durmaz
15	FW	SWE	Pontus Jansson
16	MF	SRB	Miljan Mutavdzic

No.	Pos.	Nation	Player
17	MF	SWE	Ivo Pękalski
18	FW	NGA	Edward Ofere
20	DF	BRA	Ricardinho
21	MF	SWE	Jimmy Durmaz
22	DF	SWE	Filip Stenström
23	MF	SWE	Labinot Harbuzi
23	MF	SWE	Robin Nilsson
24	FW	SWE	Agon Mehmeti
25	GK	CZE	Dusan Melichárek
26	MF	SWE	Jiloan Hamad
27	GK	SWE	Johan Dahlin
28	FW	SWE	Alexander Nilsson
29	DF	SWE	Jasmin Sudic
30	GK	SWE	Dejan Garača
36	MF	SWE	Muamet Asanovski

=== Players in/out ===
==== In ====
No.	Pos.	Nat.	Name	Age	EU	Moving from	Type	Transfer window	Ends	Transfer fee	Source
29	DF	(Sweden)	Sudic	35	EU	Youth system	Promoted	Winter		Youth system	mff.se
28	FW	(Sweden)	Nilsson	33	EU	Youth system	Promoted	Winter	2013	Youth system	mff.se
15	DF	(Sweden)	D. Durmaz	44	EU	GAIS	Transfer	Winter	2012		mff.se
7	FW	(Sweden)	Larsson	39	EU	BK Häcken	Transfer	Winter	2013		mff.se
20	DF	(Brazil)	Ricardinho	42	Non-EU	Coritiba	Transfer	Winter	2011		mff.se
16	MF	(Serbia)	Mutavdžić	40	Non-EU	Javor Ivanjica (Serbia)	Transfer	Winter	2013		mff.se
9	FW	(Brazil)	Figueiredo	44	Non-EU	Al Rayyan (Qatar)	Transfer	Winter	2013		mff.se
15	FW	(Sweden)	Jansson	34	EU	Youth system	Promoted	Summer	2014	Youth system	mff.se
27	GK	(Sweden)	Dahlin	40	EU	Lyn (Norway)	Transfer	Summer	2013		mff.se
17	MF	(Sweden)	Pękalski	35	EU	Landskrona BoIS	Transfer	Summer	2013		mff.se
22	DF	(Sweden)	Stenström	35	EU	Västerås SK	Transfer	Summer	2013		mff.se

==== Out ====
No.	Pos.	Nat.	Name	Age	EU	Moving to	Type	Transfer window	Transfer fee	Source
15	MF	(Denmark)	Jensen	20	EU	Brøndby (Denmark)	Loan return	Winter		mff.se
31	FW	(Finland)	Johansson	33	EU	Hibernian (Scotland)	Transfer	Winter		mff.se
20	FW	(Sweden)	Toivonen	22	EU	PSV (Netherlands)	Transfer	Winter		mff.se
16	DF	(Sweden)	Järdler	26	EU	Halmstads BK	Transfer	Winter		mff.se
35	GK	(Sweden)	Garaca	17	EU	IFK Malmö	Loan	Winter		mff.se
17	MF	(Sweden)	J. Nilsson	23	EU	Mjällby AIF	Loan	Winter		mff.se
34	MF	(Sweden)	Hansson	21	EU	IFK Malmö	Loan	Winter		mff.se
	MF	(Sweden)	Jansson	18	EU	IFK Malmö	Loan	Winter		mff.se
28	FW	(Sweden)	A. Nilsson	16	EU	IFK Malmö	Loan	Winter		mff.se
4	DF	(Liberia)	Dixon	27	Non-EU	Manisaspor (Turkey)	Transfer	Summer		mff.se
17	MF	(Sweden)	J. Nilsson	24	EU	Trelleborgs FF	Transfer	Summer		mff.se
13	MF	(Sweden)	Stefanidis	28	EU	Landskrona BoIS	Loan	Summer		mff.se
15	DF	(Sweden)	Durmaz	27	EU	Denizlispor (Turkey)	Transfer	Summer		mff.se
23	MF	(Sweden)	Harbuzi	23	EU	Gençlerbirliği (Turkey)	Transfer	Summer		mff.se

=== Squad stats ===
No.	Pos	Nat	Player	Total		Allsvenskan		Svenska Cupen		Other	
No.	Pos	Nat	Player	Apps	Goals	Apps	Goals	Apps	Goals	Apps	Goals
1	GK	(Sweden) SWE	Jonas Sandqvist	23	0	13	0	0	0	10	0
2	DF	(Denmark) DEN	Ulrich Vinzents	32	0	26	0	0	0	6	0
3	DF	(Sweden) SWE	Robert Åhman-Persson	36	0	26	0	1	0	9	0
4	DF	(Liberia) LBR	Jimmy Dixon	22	1	11	0	1	0	10	1
5	DF	(Brazil) BRA	Gabriel	35	0	26	0	1	0	8	0
6	DF	(Finland) FIN	Markus Halsti	18	0	10	0	0	0	8	0
7	FW	(Sweden) SWE	Daniel Larsson	38	14	27	11	0	0	11	3
8	MF	(Sweden) SWE	Daniel Andersson	32	1	26	1	1	0	5	0
9	FW	(Brazil) BRA	Wilton Figueiredo	27	4	24	4	1	0	2	0
10	MF	(Netherlands) NED	Rick Kruys	21	1	13	0	0	0	8	1
11	MF	(Sweden) SWE	Jeffrey Aubynn	16	0	10	0	0	0	6	0
13	MF	(Sweden) SWE	Babis Stefanidis	0	0	0	0	0	0	0	0
14	MF	(Sweden) SWE	Guillermo Molins	37	6	28	3	1	0	8	3
15	FW	(Sweden) SWE	Pontus Jansson	8	0	2	0	0	0	6	0
15	DF	(Sweden) SWE	David Durmaz	8	0	1	0	1	0	6	0
17	MF	(Sweden) SWE	Ivo Pękalski	0	0	0	0	0	0	0	0
16	DF	(Serbia) SRB	Miljan Mutavdžić	4	1	1	1	0	0	3	0
18	FW	(Nigeria) NGA	Edward Ofere	39	15	28	10	1	0	10	5
20	DF	(Brazil) BRA	Ricardinho	39	1	29	1	1	0	9	0
21	MF	(Sweden) SWE	Jimmy Durmaz	23	0	13	0	1	0	9	0
22	DF	(Sweden) SWE	Filip Stenström	0	0	0	0	0	0	0	0
23	MF	(Sweden) SWE	Robin Nilsson	2	0	1	0	0	0	1	0
23	MF	(Sweden) SWE	Labinot Harbuzi	21	3	13	2	1	0	7	1
24	FW	(Sweden) SWE	Agon Mehmeti	27	7	22	5	1	0	4	2
25	GK	(Czech Republic) CZE	Dusan Melichárek	8	0	5	0	1	0	2	0
26	MF	(Sweden) SWE	Jiloan Hamad	28	4	20	2	0	0	8	2
27	GK	(Sweden) SWE	Johan Dahlin	12	0	12	0	0	0	0	0
28	FW	(Sweden) SWE	Alexander Nilsson	0	0	0	0	0	0	0	0
29	DF	(Sweden) SWE	Jasmin Sudic	23	0	18	0	0	0	5	0
30	GK	(Sweden) SWE	Dejan Garača	0	0	0	0	0	0	0	0
36	MF	(Sweden) SWE	Muamet Asanovski	3	0	1	0	0	0	2	0

=== Disciplinary record ===
N	Pos.	Nat.	Name	Yellow card	Second yellow card	Red card	Notes
1	GK	(Sweden)	Sandqvist	1			
2	DF	(Denmark)	Vinzents	1			
3	DF	(Sweden)	Å-Persson	5			
4	DF	(Liberia)	Dixon	2			
5	DF	(Brazil)	Gabriel	5		1	
7	FW	(Sweden)	Larsson	3			
8	MF	(Sweden)	Andersson	4			
9	FW	(Brazil)	Figueiredo	3			
10	MF	(Netherlands)	Kruys	4			
14	MF	(Sweden)	Molins	2	1		
18	FW	(Nigeria)	Ofere	7			
20	DF	(Brazil)	Ricardinho	4			
21	MF	(Sweden)	Ricardinho	2			
23	MF	(Sweden)	Harbuzi	2			
24	FW	(Sweden)	Mehmeti	3			
26	MF	(Sweden)	Hamad	2			
29	DF	(Sweden)	Sudic	6			

Source: Match reports in Competitive matches
Only competitive matches
(yellow card) = Number of bookings; (second yellow card) = Number of sending offs after a second yellow card; (red card) = Number of sending offs by a direct red card.

== Club ==
=== Coaching staff ===
Position	Staff
Manager	(Sweden) Roland Nilsson
Assistant manager	(Sweden) Hans Gren
Assistant manager	(Sweden) Leif Engqvist
Goalkeeping coach	(Sweden) Jonnie Fedel
First team coach	(Sweden) Staffan Tapper
Fitness coach	(England) John Phillips
Physician	(Sweden) Rickard Dahan

Source: MFF-aren 2009. Malmö FF. 2009. ISBN 978-91-85319-64-0.

=== Other information ===
Chairman	(Sweden) Bengt Madsen
Managing director	(Sweden) Pelle Svensson
Sport director	(Sweden) Hasse Borg
Ground (capacity and dimensions)	Swedbank Stadion (24,000 / 105x68 m)

Source: MFF-aren 2009. Malmö FF. 2009. ISBN 978-91-85319-64-0.

== Competitions ==
=== Overall ===
Competition	Started round	Final position / round	First match	Last match
Allsvenskan	—	7th	4 April	1 November
Svenska Cupen 2009	Third round	Third round	26 April	26 April

Source: Competitions

=== Allsvenskan ===
==== League table ====
Pos	Team	Pld	W	D	L	GF	GA	GD	Pts
5	BK Häcken	30	13	9	8	43	30	+13	48
6	Örebro SK	30	12	9	9	33	32	+1	45
7	Malmö FF	30	11	10	9	40	25	+15	43
8	Helsingborgs IF	30	13	4	13	39	39	0	43
9	Trelleborgs FF	30	11	8	11	41	34	+7	41

Source: svenskfotboll.se (in Swedish)
Rules for classification: 1) points; 2) goal difference; 3) number of goals scored.

==== Results summary ====
Overall								Home						Away					
Pld	W	D	L	GF	GA	GD	Pts	W	D	L	GF	GA	GD	W	D	L	GF	GA	GD
30	11	10	9	40	25	+15	43	4	8	3	19	11	+8	7	2	6	21	14	+7

==== Results by round ====
Round	1	2	3	4	5	6	7	8	9	10	11	12	13	14	15	16	17	18	19	20	21	22	23	24	25	26	27	28	29	30
Ground	A	H	A	H	A	H	A	H	A	H	A	H	H	A	H	A	H	A	H	A	H	A	H	A	H	A	H	A	A	H
Result	W	W	W	D	L	D	L	W	L	D	L	D	L	D	D	W	D	W	L	L	D	W	W	W	W	W	L	D	L	D
Position	2	2	2	1	4	6	8	6	6	8	9	9	10	11	11	9	10	9	10	10	10	9	8	8	8	6	7	8	8	7

Source: see below
A = Away; H = Home; W = Win; D = Draw; L = Loss

==== Matches ====
Kickoff times are in CET.

4 April 2009 Round 1	BK Häcken	0–1	Malmö FF	Gothenburg
16:00		Report	Mutavdžić 85'	Stadium: Rambergsvallen; Attendance: 3,207; Referee: Stefan Johannesson

13 April 2009 Round 2	Malmö FF	3–0	Örgryte IS	Malmö
18:00	Harbuzi 61'; Mehmeti 84', 89'	Report		Stadium: Swedbank Stadion; Attendance: 23,347; Referee: Martin Hansson

16 April 2009 Round 3	AIK	0–1	Malmö FF	Solna
19:00		Report	Mehmeti 74'	Stadium: Råsunda; Attendance: 16,936; Referee: Jonas Eriksson

19 April 2009 Round 4	Malmö FF	1–1	Trelleborgs FF	Malmö
15:00	Larsson 45'	Report	Haynes 3'	Stadium: Swedbank Stadion; Attendance: 20,109; Referee: Martin Ingvarsson

22 April 2009 Round 5	IF Elfsborg	1–0	Malmö FF	Borås
20:00	Florén 30'	Report		Stadium: Borås Arena; Attendance: 8,595; Referee: Jonas Eriksson

29 April 2009 Round 6	Malmö FF	0–0	Gefle IF	Malmö
19:00		Report		Stadium: Swedbank Stadion; Attendance: 11,469; Referee: Daniel Stålhammar

4 May 2009 Round 7	Helsingborgs IF	1–0	Malmö FF	Helsingborg
19:00	Larsson 89'	Report		Stadium: Olympia; Attendance: 15,800; Referee: Martin Hansson

10 May 2009 Round 8	Malmö FF	2–1	Djurgårdens IF	Malmö
14:30	Harbuzi 6'; Figueiredo 68'	Report	Rajalakso 40'	Stadium: Swedbank Stadion; Attendance: 14,054; Referee: Markus Strömbergsson

17 May 2009 Round 9	Hammarby IF	1–0	Malmö FF	Stockholm
17:00	Davies 57'	Report		Stadium: Söderstadion; Attendance: 9,340; Referee: Jonas Eriksson

20 May 2009 Round 10	Malmö FF	0–0	Örebro SK	Malmö
19:00		Report		Stadium: Swedbank Stadion; Attendance: 12,166; Referee: Stefan Johannesson

25 May 2009 Round 11	IFK Göteborg	2–0	Malmö FF	Gothenburg
20:00	Wernbloom 13'; Hysén 69'	Report		Stadium: Gamla Ullevi; Attendance: 15,267; Referee: Markus Strömbergsson

31 May 2009 Round 12	Malmö FF	2–2	GAIS	Malmö
17:00	Molins 43'; Hamad 46'	Report	Wanderson 21', 86'	Stadium: Swedbank Stadion; Attendance: 12,287; Referee: Daniel Stålhammar

6 July 2009 Round 13	Malmö FF	1–2	Kalmar FF	Malmö
19:00	Figueiredo 33'	Report	R. Elm 49', 90'	Stadium: Swedbank Stadion; Attendance: 14,178; Referee: Markus Strömbergsson

12 July 2009 Round 14	IF Brommapojkarna	1–1	Malmö FF	Stockholm
18:00	Haglund 59'	Report	Molins 17'	Stadium: Grimsta IP; Attendance: 2,098; Referee: Jonas Eriksson

20 July 2009 Round 15	Malmö FF	0–0	Halmstads BK	Malmö
19:00		Report		Stadium: Swedbank Stadion; Attendance: 13,012; Referee: Stefan Johannesson

27 July 2009 Round 16	Halmstads BK	0–3	Malmö FF	Halmstad
19:00		Report	Hamad 67'; Mehmeti 87', 90'	Stadium: Örjans Vall; Attendance: 8,106; Referee: Martin Hansson

30 July 2009 Round 17	Malmö FF	0–0	AIK	Malmö
20:00		Report		Stadium: Swedbank Stadion; Attendance: 15,485; Referee: Jonas Eriksson

8 August 2009 Round 18	Trelleborgs FF	0–2	Malmö FF	Trelleborg
16:00		Report	Figueiredo 9'; Andersson 83' (pen.)	Stadium: Vångavallen; Attendance: 7,191; Referee: Stefan Johannesson

17 August 2009 Round 19	Malmö FF	1–2	BK Häcken	Malmö
19:00	Ricardinho 35'	Report	Söderberg 17'; Paulinho 51'	Stadium: Swedbank Stadion; Attendance: 11,432; Referee: Daniel Stålhammar

24 August 2009 Round 20	Örgryte IS	1–0	Malmö FF	Gothenburg
19:00	Pereira 27'	Report		Stadium: Gamla Ullevi; Attendance: 2,901; Referee: Michael Lerjéus

31 August 2009 Round 21	Malmö FF	0–0	Helsingborgs IF	Malmö
19:00		Report		Stadium: Swedbank Stadion; Attendance: 22,822; Referee: Stefan Johannesson

14 September 2009 Round 22	Djurgårdens IF	1–2	Malmö FF	Stockholm
20:00	Youssef 21'	Report	Ofere 39', 56'	Stadium: Stockholms Stadion; Attendance: 7,970; Referee: Michael Lerjéus

21 September 2009 Round 23	Malmö FF	5–0	IF Elfsborg	Malmö
19:00	Larsson 4', 79'; Molins 6'; Ofere 40', 61'	Report		Stadium: Swedbank Stadion; Attendance: 12,088; Referee: Jonas Eriksson

24 September 2009 Round 24	Gefle IF	0–3	Malmö FF	Gävle
19:00		Report	Ofere 29', 33'; Larsson 59'	Stadium: Strömvallen; Attendance: 3,114; Referee: Daniel Stålhammar

27 September 2009 Round 25	Malmö FF	3–1	Hammarby IF	Malmö
14:30	Larsson 43', 67'; Edward Ofere 90'	Report	Helg 83'	Stadium: Swedbank Stadion; Attendance: 12,187; Referee: Sven-Martin Åkesson

4 October 2009 Round 26	Örebro SK	0–3	Malmö FF	Örebro
16:00		Report	Larsson 52', 59', 90'	Stadium: Behrn Arena; Attendance: 7,157; Referee: Markus Strömbergsson

19 October 2009 Round 27	Malmö FF	0–1	IFK Göteborg	Malmö
19:00		Report	Olsson 28'	Stadium: Swedbank Stadion; Attendance: 18,293; Referee: Jonas Eriksson

23 October 2009 Round 28	GAIS	1–1	Malmö FF	Gothenburg
19:00	Lindström 24'	Report	Figueiredo 89' (pen.)	Stadium: Gamla Ullevi; Attendance: 11,685; Referee: Åke Andreasson

27 October 2009 Round 29	Kalmar FF	5–4	Malmö FF	Kalmar
19:00	Santos 4'; Dauda 35', 90'; Sobralense 41', 85'	Report	Larsson 14', 25'; Ofere 32', 62'	Stadium: Fredriksskans; Attendance: 4,779; Referee: Stefan Johannesson

1 November 2009 Round 30	Malmö FF	1–1	IF Brommapojkarna	Malmö
15:00	Ofere 69'	Report	Bahoui 85'	Stadium: Swedbank Stadion; Attendance: 9,295; Referee: Michael Lerjéus

=== Svenska Cupen ===
26 April 2009 Round 3	Mjällby AIF	1–0	Malmö FF	Hällevik
17:00	Fejzullahu 15' (pen.)	Report		Stadium: Strandvallen; Attendance: 4,034; Referee: Håkan Jonasson

== Non competitive ==
=== Pre-season ===
27 January 2009 Friendly	Copenhagen (Denmark)	4–1	(Sweden) Malmö FF	Copenhagen, Denmark
13:00	Nordstrand 29'; Vingaard 30', 85'; Santin 89'	Report	Ofere 40'	Stadium: KB Träningsanläggning; Attendance: 0

7 February 2009 Friendly	Malmö FF (Sweden)	3–0	(Sweden) Landskrona BoIS	Malmö, Sweden
13:00	Molins 12', 39'; Mehmeti 89'	Report		Stadium: Konstgräsplan 9 Attendance: 1,650; Referee: Martin Ingvarsson

14 February 2009 Friendly	IF Elfsborg (Sweden)	2–0	(Sweden) Malmö FF	Borås, Sweden
13:00	Keene 52'; Hult 85'	Report		Stadium: Borås Arena; Attendance: 979; Referee: Antti Kanerva

21 February 2009 Friendly	Malmö FF (Sweden)	1–2	(Sweden) Örgryte IS	Malmö, Sverige
13:00	Ofere 89'	Report	Eriksson 55'; Zavadil 82'	Stadium: Konstgräsplan 9 Attendance: 700

28 February 2009 Friendly	Malmö FF (Sweden)	1–0	(Sweden) Lyngby BK	Malmö, Sverige
13:00	Larsson 25'	Report		Stadium: Konstgräsplan 9 Attendance: 0

7 March 2009 Friendly	Malmö FF (Sweden)	0–0	(Sweden) BK Häcken	Bjärred, Sweden
13:00		Report		Stadium: Borgeby IP; Attendance: 0

11 March 2009 Friendly	HJK (Finland)	0–2	(Sweden) Malmö FF	Marbella, Spain
16:00		Report	Dixon 23'; Ofere 50'	Stadium: ? Attendance: 50

18 March 2009 Friendly	Mjällby AIF (Sweden)	1–1	(Sweden) Malmö FF	Hällevik, Sweden
15:00	Robledo 19'	Report	Molins 25'	Stadium: Strandvallen; Attendance: 0

28 March 2009 Friendly	Malmö FF (Sweden)	5–0	Kosovo	Malmö, Sweden
13:00	Larsson 23'; Ofere 36', 72'; Harbuzi 84'; Kruys 87'	Report		Stadium: Malmö Stadion; Attendance: 3,000

=== Mid-season ===
23 June 2009 Friendly	Malmö FF (Sweden)	2–2	(Sweden) IF Elfsborg	Lomma, Sverige
15:00	Mehmeti 6'; Larsson 40'	Report	Svensson 12'; Mobaeck 38'	Stadium: Lomma IP; Attendance: -

28 June 2009 Friendly	AaB (Denmark)	2–2	(Sweden) Malmö FF	Aalborg, Denmark
14:00	Johansson 64'; Dalsgaard 89'	Rapport	Hamad 46', 86'	Stadium: Hune Boldklub; Attendance: -
