= 2008 Malmö FF season =

Malmö FF
2008 season
- Chairman: Bengt Madsen
- Manager: Roland Nilsson
- Stadium: Malmö Stadion
- Allsvenskan: 6th
- Svenska Cupen: Round 4
- Top goalscorer: League: Ola Toivonen (14); All: Ola Toivonen (14)
- Highest home attendance: 18,884 (31 March vs IFK Göteborg, Allsvenskan)
- Lowest home attendance: 2,214 (28 June vs Hammarby IF, Svenska Cupen)
- Average home league attendance: 9,763 (Allsvenskan only)
Home colours	Away colours	Third colours

The 2008 season was Malmö FF's 97th in existence, their 73rd season in Allsvenskan and their 8th consecutive season in the league. They competed in Allsvenskan where they finished in 6th position and Svenska Cupen where they were knocked out in the fourth round. The season was Roland Nilssons first season as Malmö FF manager and the last season for the club at Malmö Stadion before moving to Swedbank Stadion for the 2009 season. To celebrate the club's 51-year stay at the stadium, an alternative home kit was used for the first and last match of the league season. The last league match at Malmö Stadion was played against GIF Sundsvall on 9 November and won 6–0 by Malmö FF.

== Players ==
=== Squad ===
Note: Flags indicate national team as defined under FIFA eligibility rules; some limited exceptions apply. Players may hold more than one non-FIFA nationality.

No.	Pos.	Nation	Player
1	GK	SWE	Jonas Sandqvist
2	DF	DEN	Ulrich Vinzents
3	MF	SWE	Robert Åhman-Persson
3	DF	SWE	Daniel Theorin
4	DF	LBR	Jimmy Dixon
5	DF	BRA	Gabriel
6	DF	FIN	Markus Halsti
7	DF	SWE	Anders Andersson
9	FW	SWE	Niklas Skoog
10	MF	NED	Rick Kruys
11	MF	SWE	Jeffrey Aubynn
13	MF	SWE	Babis Stefanidis
14	FW	SWE	Guillermo Molins
15	MF	DEN	Mike Jensen (on loan from Brøndby IF)
16	DF	SWE	Christian Järdler
17	MF	SWE	Joakim Nilsson

No.	Pos.	Nation	Player
18	FW	NGA	Edward Ofere
20	MF	SWE	Ola Toivonen
21	MF	SWE	Jimmy Touma
22	MF	SWE	Robin Nilsson
23	MF	SWE	Labinot Harbuzi
24	FW	SWE	Agon Mehmeti
25	DF	SWE	Behrang Safari
26	MF	SWE	Jiloan Hamad
27	DF	SWE	Anes Mravac
28	FW	SWE	Alexander Nilsson
29	DF	SWE	Jasmin Sudic
30	MF	SWE	Daniel Andersson (Captain)
31	FW	FIN	Jonatan Johansson
35	GK	SWE	Dejan Garača
40	GK	CZE	Dusan Melichárek

=== Disciplinary record ===
N	Pos.	Nat.	Name	Yellow card	Second yellow card	Red card	Notes
2	DF	(Denmark)	Vinzents	4	0	0	
3	MF	(Sweden)	Å-Persson	3	0	0	
4	DF	(Liberia)	Dixon	3	0	0	
5	DF	(Brazil)	Gabriel	2	0	0	
6	DF	(Finland)	Halsti	3	0	0	
10	MF	(Netherlands)	Kruys	2	0	0	
17	MF	(Sweden)	Aubynn	5	0	0	
14	MF	(Sweden)	Molins	4	0	0	
15	MF	(Denmark)	Jensen	2	0	0	
16	DF	(Sweden)	Järdler	2	0	0	
18	FW	(Nigeria)	Ofere	6	0	0	
20	MF	(Sweden)	Toivonen	7	0	0	
23	MF	(Sweden)	Harbuzi	4	0	0	
24	FW	(Sweden)	Mehmeti	1	0	0	
25	DF	(Sweden)	Safari	2	0	0	
29	DF	(Sweden)	Sudic	1	0	0	
30	MF	(Sweden)	Andersson	6	0	1	
31	FW	(Finland)	Johansson	2	0	1	

Source: Match reports in Competitive matches
Only competitive matches
(yellow card) = Number of bookings; (second yellow card) = Number of sending offs after a second yellow card; (red card) = Number of sending offs by a direct red card.

== Club ==
=== Coaching staff ===
Position	Staff
Manager	(Sweden) Roland Nilsson
Assistant manager	(Sweden) Hans Gren
Assistant manager	(Sweden) Leif Engqvist
Goalkeeping coach	(Sweden) Jonnie Fedel
First team coach	(Sweden) Staffan Tapper
Physician	(Sweden) Rickard Dahan

Source: MFF-aren 2008. Malmö FF. 2008. ISBN 978-91-977915-0-2.

=== Other information ===
Chairman	(Sweden) Bengt Madsen
Managing director	(Sweden) Pelle Svensson
Sport director	(Sweden) Hasse Borg
Ground (capacity and dimensions)	Malmö Stadion (27,500 / )

Source: MFF-aren 2008. Malmö FF. 2008. ISBN 978-91-977915-0-2.

== Competitions ==
=== Overall ===
Competition	Started round	Current position / round	Final position / round	First match	Last match
Allsvenskan	—	—	6th	31 March 2008	9 November 2008
Svenska Cupen	Second round	—	Fourth round	1 May 2008	28 June 2008

Source: Competitions

=== Allsvenskan ===
==== League table ====
Pos	Team	Pld	W	D	L	GF	GA	GD	Pts	Qualification or relegation
4	Helsingborgs IF	30	16	6	8	54	41	+13	54	Qualification to Europa League first qualifying round (Note: Helsingborg qualified for the UEFA Europa League as they received IFK Göteborg's initial qualifying spot.)
5	AIK	30	12	9	9	36	32	+4	45	
6	Malmö FF	30	12	8	10	51	46	+5	44	
7	Örebro SK	30	11	9	10	36	39	−3	42	
8	Halmstads BK	30	11	8	11	41	38	+3	41	

Source: svenskfotboll.se (in Swedish)
Rules for classification: 1) points; 2) goal difference; 3) number of goals scored.

==== Results summary ====
Overall								Home						Away					
Pld	W	D	L	GF	GA	GD	Pts	W	D	L	GF	GA	GD	W	D	L	GF	GA	GD
30	12	8	10	51	46	+5	44	7	4	4	27	20	+7	5	4	6	24	26	−2

Source: svenskfotboll.se

==== Results by round ====
Round	1	2	3	4	5	6	7	8	9	10	11	12	13	14	15	16	17	18	19	20	21	22	23	24	25	26	27	28	29	30
Ground	H	A	H	A	H	A	H	A	A	H	A	H	A	H	A	H	A	H	H	A	H	A	A	H	H	A	H	A	A	H
Result	D	D	D	D	W	W	W	L	W	D	L	W	D	L	L	W	L	L	D	W	L	L	L	L	W	D	W	W	W	W
Position	6	11	12	11	8	4	2	5	5	5	7	5	6	7	7	7	7	7	10	8	8	10	12	12	11	12	12	8	6	6

Source: svenskfotboll.se
A = Away; H = Home; W = Win; D = Draw; L = Loss

==== Matches ====
Kickoff times are in CEST.

31 March 2008 Round 1	Malmö FF	1–1	IFK Göteborg	Malmö
19:45	Gabriel 62'	Report	Wallerstedt 57'	Stadium: Malmö Stadion; Attendance: 18,884; Referee: Peter Fröjdfeldt (Eskilstuna)

5 April 2008 Round 2	Djurgårdens IF	1–1	Malmö FF	Stockholm
16:00	Rajalakso 49'	Report	Skoog 3'	Stadium: Stockholms Stadion; Attendance: 13,379; Referee: Jonas Eriksson (Stockholm)

10 April 2008 Round 3	Malmö FF	1–1	IF Elfsborg	Malmö
19:00	Molins 33'	Report	Bajrami 19'	Stadium: Malmö Stadion; Attendance: 13,299; Referee: Markus Strömbergsson (Gävle)

13 April 2008 Round 4	Trelleborgs FF	0–0	Malmö FF	Trelleborg
17:45		Report		Stadium: Vångavallen; Attendance: 6,748; Referee: Daniel Stålhammar (Landskrona)

16 April 2008 Round 5	Malmö FF	2–0	Gefle IF	Malmö
19:00	Molins 12'; Dixon 54'	Report		Stadium: Malmö Stadion; Attendance: 9,147; Referee: Sven-Martin Åkesson (Solna)

21 April 2008 Round 6	Halmstads BK	2–3	Malmö FF	Halmstad
20:00	Prent 6'; Anselmo 85'	Report	Järdler 46'; Toivonen 73'; Harbuzi 90'	Stadium: Örjans Vall; Attendance: 6,909; Referee: Stefan Johannesson (Stocksund)

24 April 2008 Round 7	Malmö FF	2–1	IFK Norrköping	Malmö
19:00	Toivonen 26', 46'	Report	Spong 72'	Stadium: Malmö Stadion; Attendance: 12,911; Referee: Markus Strömbergsson (Gävle)

28 April 2008 Round 8	Helsingborgs IF	4–2	Malmö FF	Helsingborg
20:00	Omotoyossi 1'; Larsson 24', 63'; Lantz 76'	Report	Johansson 9', 65'	Stadium: Olympia; Attendance: 16,704; Referee: Martin Hansson (Holmsjö)

4 May 2008 Round 9	Örebro SK	0–3	Malmö FF	Örebro
16:00		Report	Ofere 29', 47'; Johansson 40'	Stadium: Behrn Arena; Attendance: 9,445; Referee: Åke Andreasson (Stenungsund

8 May 2008 Round 10	Malmö FF	1–1	GAIS	Malmö
19:00	90' (o.g.)	Report	Pachajyan 48'	Stadium: Malmö Stadion; Attendance: 13,337; Referee: Martin Hansson (Holmsjö)

11 May 2008 Round 11	AIK	2–0	Malmö FF	Solna
17:45	Stephenson 86'; Mendes 89'	Report		Stadium: Råsunda; Attendance: 19,569; Referee: Jonas Eriksson (Stockholm)

3 July 2008 Round 12	Malmö FF	2–1	Ljungskile SK	Malmö
19:00	Toivonen 27', 75'	Report	Kristoffersson 17'	Stadium: Malmö Stadion; Attendance: 9,095; Referee: Michael Lerjéus (Skövde)

6 July 2008 Round 13	GIF Sundsvall	0–0	Malmö FF	Sundsvall
18:00		Report		Stadium: Norrporten Arena; Attendance: 5,269; Referee: Åke Andreasson (Stenungsund)

14 July 2008 Round 14	Malmö FF	2–4	Hammarby IF	Malmö
20:00	Johansson 34'; Toivonen 78'	Report	Davies 13', 43'; Gaete 36'; Johansson 70'	Stadium: Malmö Stadion; Attendance: 13,196; Referee: Martin Hansson (Holmsjö)

21 July 2008 Round 15	Kalmar FF	3–2	Malmö FF	Kalmar
19:00	Santin 16'; Ingelsten 30', 43'	Report	Toivonen 49'; Johansson 68'	Stadium: Fredriksskans; Attendance: 9,589; Referee: Stefan Johannesson (Stocksund)

27 July 2008 Round 16	Malmö FF	3–2	Kalmar FF	Malmö
18:00	Järdler 35'; Mehmeti 84', 88'	Report	D.Elm 63'; Rosengren 79'	Stadium: Malmö Stadion; Attendance: 13,130; Referee: Peter Fröjdfeldt (Eskilstuna)

2 August 2008 Round 17	IFK Göteborg	2–0	Malmö FF	Gothenburg
16:00	Söder 1'; Wallerstedt 45'	Report		Stadium: Ullevi; Attendance: 8,015; Referee: Martin Hansson (Holmsjö)

10 August 2008 Round 18	Malmö FF	1–2	Djurgårdens IF	Malmö
18:00	Toivonen 45'	Report	Kusi-Asare 19'; Sjölund 83'	Stadium: Malmö Stadion; Attendance: 10,052; Referee: Martin Hansson (Holmsjö)

25 August 2008 Round 20	Malmö FF	1–1	Trelleborgs FF	Malmö
19:00	Ofere 88'	Report	Jensen 5'	Stadium: Malmö Stadion; Attendance: 11,406; Referee: Jonas Eriksson (Stockholm)

31 August 2008 Round 21	Gefle IF	1–2	Malmö FF	Gävle
18:00	Jawo 86'	Report	Harbuzi 75'; Johansson 81'	Stadium: Strömvallen; Attendance: 4,309; Referee: Martin Hansson (Holmsjö)

13 September 2008 Round 22	Malmö FF	0–3	Halmstads BK	Malmö
16:00		Report	Johansson 22'; Anselmo 68', 73'	Stadium: Malmö Stadion; Attendance: 7,486; Referee: Peter Fröjdfeldt (Eskilstuna)

17 September 2008 Round 19	IF Elfsborg	4–0	Malmö FF	Borås
20:00	Ishizaki 11'; Mobaeck 45'; Bajrami 67'; Keene 73'	Report		Stadium: Borås Arena; Attendance: 7,607; Referee: Stefan Johannesson (Stocksund)

23 September 2008 Round 23	IFK Norrköping	1–0	Malmö FF	Norrköping
19:00	Amuneke 12'	Report		Stadium: Idrottsparken; Attendance: 4,783; Referee: Jonas Eriksson (Stockholm)

30 September 2008 Round 24	Malmö FF	1–2	Helsingborgs IF	Malmö
19:45	Ofere 30'	Report	Larsson 39'; Jönsson 63'	Stadium: Malmö Stadion; Attendance: 15,666; Referee: Peter Fröjdfeldt (Eskilstuna)

6 October 2008 Round 25	Malmö FF	3–1	Örebro SK	Malmö
19:00	Andersson 10', 22'; Ofere 90'	Report	Nordback 47'	Stadium: Malmö Stadion; Attendance: 6,651; Referee: Sven-Martin Åkesson (Solna)

19 October 2008 Round 26	GAIS	2–2	Malmö FF	Gothenburg
15:00	Wánderson 53', 90'	Report	Toivonen 2'; Ofere 30'	Stadium: Ullevi; Attendance: 2,770; Referee: Sven-Martin Åkesson (Solna)

22 October 2008 Round 27	Malmö FF	1–0	AIK	Malmö
19:00	Aubynn 56'	Report		Stadium: Malmö Stadion; Attendance: 7,072; Referee: Tobias Mattsson (Karlstad)

28 October 2008 Round 28	Ljungskile SK	1–3	Malmö FF	Ljungskile
19:00	Zarkovic 36'	Report	Ofere 30'; Toivonen 54', 80'	Stadium: Starke Arvid Arena; Attendance: 1,683; Referee: Michael Lerjéus (Skövde)

3 November 2008 Round 29	Hammarby IF	3–6	Malmö FF	Stockholm
19:00	Davies 11'; Guterstam 18'; Macedo 34'	Report	Åhman-Persson 9'; Aubynn 24', 55'; Toivonen 30'; Andersson 37'; Touma 90'	Stadium: Söderstadion; Attendance: 8,308; Referee: Tobias Mattsson (Karlstad)

9 November 2008 Round 30	Malmö FF	6–0	GIF Sundsvall	Malmö
15:00	Ofere 23', 32'; Toivonen 29', 50'; Touma 83'; Mehmeti 90'	Report		Stadium: Malmö Stadion; Attendance: 6,580; Referee: Jonas Eriksson (Stockholm)

=== Svenska Cupen ===
Kickoff times are in CEST.

1 May 2008 Round 2	Kristianstads FF	2–3	Malmö FF	Kristianstad
16:00	Fischer 12'; Nilsson 64'	Report	Demir 17'; Molins 78', 93'	Stadium: Kristianstads IP; Attendance: 2,470; Referee: Magnus Ahlsén (Linköping)

15 May 2008 Round 3	Carlstads United BK	0–2	Malmö FF	Karlstad
19:00		Report	Mehmeti 37'; Skoog 56'	Stadium: Tingvalla IP; Attendance: 2,950; Referee: Antti Kanerva (Olofstorp)

28 June 2008 Round 4	Malmö FF	2–3	Hammarby IF	Malmö
15:30	Harbuzi 17'; Johansson 39'	Report	Paulinho 45', 76'; Andersson 74'	Stadium: Malmö Stadion; Attendance: 2,214; Referee: Håkan Jonasson (Helsingborg)

== Non competitive ==
=== Pre-season ===
9 February 2008 Friendly	Malmö FF (Sweden)	3–1	(Denmark) Lyngby BK	Malmö, Sweden
11:00	Mehmeti 10'; D. Andersson 39'; Ofere 51'	Report	Aabech 87'	Stadium: Kulladals IP; Attendance: 1,800; Referee: Daniel Stålhammar

18 February 2008 Friendly	Malmö FF (Sweden)	1–1	(Sweden) Trelleborgs FF	Malmö, Sweden
13:00	Johansson 71'	Report	Mensah 10'	Stadium: Kulladals IP; Attendance: 2,100; Referee: Daniel Stålhammar

23 February 2008 Friendly	FC Nordsjælland (Denmark)	2–1	(Sweden) Malmö FF	Farum, Denmark
13:00	Kristensen 10'; Bernburg 39'	Report	Hansson 55'	Stadium: Farum Park; Attendance: 235; Referee: Lars Christoffersen

2 March 2008 Friendly	Palm Beach Pumas (United States)	1–14	(Sweden) Malmö FF	Florida, United States
12:00	Okänd 47'	Report	Molins 5'; Skoog 9', 11', 60', 65', 76'; Johansson 27', 31', 40', 51'; 71' Mehmeti; Nilsson 81'; Aubynn 85'; Hamad 89'	Stadium: University of Central Florida; Attendance: 35

4 March 2008 Friendly	UCF Knights (United States)	0–2	(Sweden) Malmö FF	Florida, United States
12:00		Report	Mehmeti 39', 74'	Stadium: University of Central Florida; Attendance: 0

11 March 2008 Friendly	Malmö FF (Sweden)	1–0	(Sweden) Mjällby AIF	Malmö, Sweden
15:00	Johansson 39'	Report		Stadium: Ellenborgs IP; Attendance: 500

15 March 2008 Friendly	Malmö FF (Sweden)	1–1	(Norway) Lyn	Malmö, Sweden
14:00	Skoog 22'	Report	Guastavino 63'	Stadium: Rosengårds IP; Attendance: 0

24 March 2008 Friendly	Malmö FF (Sweden)	2–3	(Sweden) BK Häcken	Malmö, Sweden
15:00	Skoog 13', 59'	Report	Okänd 4', 50'; Henriksson 78'	Stadium: Malmö Stadion; Attendance: 1,827

=== Mid-season ===
14 June 2008 Friendly	Malmö FF (Sweden)	1–1	(Finland) FC Honka	Malmö, Sweden
15:00	Sudic 35'	Report	Okänd 10'	Stadium: Malmö IP; Attendance: 0

20 August 2008 Friendly	FC Nordsjælland (Denmark)	0–1	(Sweden) Malmö FF	Farum, Denmark
14:00		Report	Ofere 19'	Stadium: Farum Park; Attendance: 50
