= Adam Eriksson =

Adam Eriksson may refer to:

- Adam Eriksson (footballer, born 1988), Swedish footballer for Ljungskile SK
- Adam Eriksson (footballer, born 1990), Swedish footballer for Helsingborgs IF
