= Guillermo Molins =

Swedish footballer

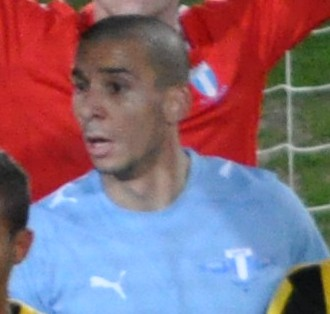
- Molins playing for Malmö FF

Personal information
- Full name: Guillermo Federico Molins Palmeiro
- Date of birth: 26 September 1988 (age 38)
- Place of birth: Montevideo, Uruguay
- Height: 1.86 m (6 ft 1 in)
- Positions: Winger; striker

Team information
- Current team: Sarpsborg 08 II (manager)

Youth career
- 1992–2001: Kävlinge GIF
- 2002: Landskrona BoIS
- 2003–2004: Stora Harrie IF
- 2005: Kävlinge GIF
- 2005–2006: Malmö FF

Senior career*
Years	Team	Apps	(Gls)
2006–2011	Malmö FF	106	(15)
2011–2013	Anderlecht	7	(0)
2013	→ Betis (loan)	4	(0)
2013–2016	Malmö FF	37	(19)
2016	Beijing Renhe	14	(0)
2017–2018	Panathinaikos	25	(6)
2018–2020	Malmö FF	35	(7)
2020	Sarpsborg 08	5	(0)
2021	Rosenborg	10	(2)
2021–2022	Sarpsborg 08	31	(6)
Total		274	(55)

International career^{‡}
2007	Sweden U19	4	(1)
2008–2010	Sweden U21	23	(2)
2010–2014	Sweden	6	(1)

Managerial career
- 2023–2024: Sarpsborg 08 2
- 2025: Landskrona BoIS (U19)
- 2026–: Malmö FF (assistant)
- * Club domestic league appearances and goals as of 3 April 2023 ‡ National team caps and goals as of 21 January 2014

Guillermo Federico Molins Palmeiro (locally [ɡiˈʝeɾmo moˈlins]; born 26 September 1988) is a former professional footballer who played as a forward. Born in Uruguay, he played for the Sweden national team.

Beginning his career with Malmö FF in 2006, he has gone on to play professionally in Belgium, Spain, China, Greece, and Norway. A full international between 2010 and 2014, he has won six caps and scored one goal for the Sweden national team.

== Club career ==
=== Malmö FF ===
Born in Montevideo, Uruguay, Molins moved to Sweden when he was four year old. This was due to Uruguay's dictatorship as the reason why his family fled the country. Molins began his football career at Kävlinge GIF and moved to Landskrona BoIS, where he stayed there for a year. Molins then joined Kävlinge GIF for the second time in 2005 via Stora Harrie IF. In August 2005, he joined Malmö FF, starting out his professional football career.

Molins started out at the club's youth team for the rest of the 2005 season. He was promoted to the Malmö’s second season in the 2006 season. Around the same time, Molins was promoted to the club's first team when he was featured in a training match against Kristianstads FF on 28 February 2006. Molins later helped Malmö FF's second team win the league after beating Kirsebergs IF on 19 September 2006. He was then called up to the club's first team against Hammarby and made his debut for Malmö FF in Allsvenskan on 2 October 2006, coming on as an 87th-minute substitute for Emil Hallfreðsson, in a 2–2 draw. Molins then helped the club's second team reach the JSM tournament final by contributing good performances and scoring, only to lose 4–0 against Brommapojkarna's second team. But he did help Malmö FF's second team win the Malmö Championship. Molins went on to make five appearances in the club's first team at the end of the 2006 season.

Ahead of the 2007 season, Molins was promoted to the Malmö’s first team and signed his first professional contract with the club. It wasn't until on 15 May 2007 when he made his first appearance of the season, coming on as a late substitute, in a 1–0 win against Helsingborg. A month later on 15 June 2007, Molins made his first start for Malmö and played 54 minutes before being substituted, in a 2–1 loss against Halmstad. However, he found his playing time, mostly coming from the substitute bench throughout the 2007 season. As a result, Molins was demoted to the club's second time and found his playing time there. He later spoke in an interview with Malmö FF about his development and hope to earn a place in the first team. At the end of the 2007 season, Molins went on to make eleven appearances in all competitions.

Ahead of the 2008 season, Molins signed a contract with the Malmö FF, keeping him until 2011 and switched number shirt to 14. Since the start of the 2008 season, he fought for a regular place in the starting eleven for the club. In the opening game of the season, Molins set up Malmö FF's only goal of the game, in a 1–1 draw against IFK Göteborg. A week later on 10 April 2008, he scored his first goal for the club, in a 1–1 draw against Elfsborg. Six days later on 16 April 2008, Molins scored his second goal for Malmö FF, in a 2–0 win against Gefle. Two weeks later on 1 May 2008, he scored twice for the club, in a 3–2 win against Kristianstads in second round of the Svenska Cupen. During a 2–1 loss against Helsingborgs on 30 September 2008, Molins set up Malmö FF's only goal of the game but, when taken off by manager Roland Nilsson in the 66th minute, he reacted furiously and kicked the bench. This saw him being dropped from the squad for one match by the club. Having helped Malmö FF sixth place in the league, Molins said: "I still see myself as a striker, and I hope I get more chances at the top, said Guillermo Molins after the match. Although he is obviously happy to have kept a regular place in the team, and plays where he is placed by the coach." Despite suffering injuries during the 2008 season, he went on to make thirty appearances and scoring four times in all competitions.

At the start of the 2009 season, Molins continued to establish himself in the first team, and was the manager's choice as right midfielder in the starting line-up. It wasn't until on 31 May 2009 when he scored his first goal of the season, in a 2–2 draw against GAIS. In a match against Brommapojkarna on 12 July 2009, Molins scored his second goal of the season, but was sent–off for the second bookable offence in the 70th minute, in a 1–1 draw. After serving a one match suspension, he returned to the starting line–up against Halmstads on 27 July 2009, coming on as a late substitute, in a 3–0 win. Between 14 September 2009 and 4 October 2009, Molins set up the total of five goals, as well as, scoring his third goal of the season in a 5–0 win against Elfsborg. At the end of the 2009 season, he went on to make twenty–nine appearances and scoring three times in all competitions.

Ahead of the 2010 season, Molins said that his aim this season was to provide more assists for Malmö FF. He started the season well by scoring his first goal of the season, in a 3–0 win against Örebro on 23 March 2010. Molins then scored four more goals in the first half of the season. He continued to establish himself in the first team, and proved to be a very skilled dribbler, becoming involved in most attacks for the club. It wasn't until on 4 July 2010 when Molins scored his sixth goal of the season, in a 4–1 loss against Mjällby in the fourth round of the Svenska Cupen. However in the second half of the season, he was challenged in some games by Jiloan Hamad, which saw him placed on the substitute bench. Despite this, he regained his first team place towards the end of the 2010 season. Molins then scored two more goals, coming against Trelleborg and BK Häcken. He helped Malmö FF win the league for the first time in six years by beating Mjällby AIF 2–0 on 7 November 2010. Despite missing one match throughout the 2010 season, Molins went on to make thirty appearances and scoring eight times in all competitions. Throughout the 2010 season, Molins’ performance attracted interests from European clubs, such as, Bundesliga side 1. FC Köln, Primeira Liga side Sporting CP and Scottish Premiership side Celtic. This led to the club began a contract negotiations for the player in effort to keep him but he wanted to leave Malmö.

Ahead of the 2011 season, Molins continued to be linked a move away from Malmö, with Serie A clubs and even Sporting CP, who renewed their interest, wanted to sign him. But he ended up staying at the club despite having his contract set to expire at the end of the 2011 season. At the start of the 2011 season, Molins continued to be challenged for a position in the starting eleven by Hamad and Jimmy Durmaz in the start of the 2011 season, partly due to minor injuries on his part. It wasn't until on 20 April 2011 when he scored his first goal of the season, in a 1–0 win against Mjällby AIF. On 15 May 2011, Molins secured a 2–1 home win against Örebro SK with two powerful shots in the top left goal corner after the team had been down 0–1 in half time.

Malmö FF's director of sports Per Ågren announced on 26 May 2011 that he expected Molins to leave the club in the summer of 2011 because his contract was ending in November and Molins had declined to negotiate a renewal. On 2 June 2011, several newspapers reported that Molins had started negotiations with Anderlecht, three days after former club partner Behrang Safari had signed for the Belgian club. On 17 June 2011, Malmö FF reported that Molins had signed a four-year contract with Anderlecht.

=== Anderlecht ===
Molins was announced an Anderlecht player on 17 June 2011. Just 8 days later Molins was carried off the field after just 25 minutes in a friendly against Knokke, he tore the ligaments of his knee and also his meniscus was affected. After the match, it was announced that he would be out for six months. At the beginning of 2012, Molins began making progress of making a recovery from his injury, though he had to wait two months to be fully fit. But the following month saw Molins returned full training and it wasn't until on 18 March 2012, he finally played a few minutes in the 2–2 game on the field of Sint-Truidense. It wasn't until on 6 May 2012 when Molins made his second appearance for the club, coming on as an 86th-minute substitute, in a 1–1 draw against Club Brugge, resulting in Anderlecht winning the league title. This was followed up by making his first start for the club, as Anderlecht lost 2–0 against Kortrijk. At the end of the 2011–12 season, he went on to make four appearances in all competitions.

Ahead of the 2012–13 season, Molins said in an interview that he hope to make a comeback for the club now that his injury has been recovered. Molins then scored his first goal for Anderlecht in a 6–0 win against FK Ekranas in the second leg of the UEFA Champions League Third Round, resulting in the club going through to the next round following their 11–0 win on aggregate. However, he continued to find his first team opportunities limited, due to competitions in the midfield positions and was placed on the substitute bench. After a month away from the first team, Molins made his first appearance against Royal Francs Borains in the sixth round of the Belgian Cup, starting the whole game, in a 2–0 win. A month later on 24 October 2012, he made his UEFA Champions League debut, coming on as an 83rd-minute substitute, in a 1–0 loss against Zenit Saint Petersburg. By the time Molins was sent on loan to Real Betis, he made seven appearances and scoring once in all competitions in the 2012–13 season.

As a result of lack of first team opportunities, Molins told Anderlecht's management that he wanted to leave the club to get first team football. On 16 January 2013, Molins went on loan to La Liga side Real Betis for the remainder of the 2012–13 season. Upon joining the club, he confirmed to have chosen Betis instead of clubs in the Dutch Eredivisie. Molins made his debut for the club, coming on as a second-half substitute, in a 1–1 draw against Atlético Madrid in the second leg of the Copa del Rey quarter–finals, resulting in Real Betis elimination from the tournament. He made four appearances coming in from the bench for the club. Following his loan spell at Real Betis came to an end, Anderlecht placed Molins on a transfer list and expected him to leave the club. This led to European clubs keen on signing him, but the player preferred a return to Sweden, with his former club, Malmö FF, interested in signing him. After leaving Anderlecht, he said his time in Belgium was difficult and felt frozen at the club.

=== Return to Malmö FF ===
On 11 August 2013, the last day of the Swedish transfer window, Molins signed a three-year contract with his former club Malmö FF. He was given a pitch presentation and the number 24 jersey before the home fixture against AIK.

Molins played his first match back for the club on 18 August when he was substituted on in the away fixture against Kalmar FF after an hours play and later scored the 4–0 goal for Malmö FF in a match that ended 4–1 for the club and made them league's leaders. Since joining Malmö FF, the major difference from his last spell at the club was that Molins was played as an attacker instead of his usual position as winger. He then added four more goals, including a brace against IF Brommapojkarna on 20 October 2013. Molins eventually earned the team the 2013 league title after scoring both goals against Elfsborg on 28 October, giving Malmö FF an insurmountable five-point lead before the last matchday. In a follow–up match against Syrianska, which was the last game of the season, he scored the club's opening goal of the game, but was sent–off for a second bookable offence, in a 3–1 win. Seven days later on 10 November 2013, Molins scored the winning goal for Malmö, as the club beat IFK Göteborg to win the Svenska Supercupen. At the end of the 2013 season, he went on to make thirteen appearances and scoring nine times in all competitions.

At the start of the 2014 season, Molins was given a captaincy in the absence of Markus Rosenberg, as well as retaining his first team place. He captained his first match of the season and scored his first goal of the season, in a 7–1 win against Degerfors in the Svenska Cupen. This was followed up by scoring in the Svenska Cupen matches against Ängelholm (twice) and Hammarby (in which Molins was sent–off for a second bookable offence and served a two match as a result). His goal scoring form continued when he scored four goals throughout April, including a brace against IFK Göteborg on 7 April 2014. His performance led to speculation over talks of a new contract. Molins’ goal scoring form continued when he scored four consecutive goals between 8 May 2014 and 26 May 2014. Molins continued to play very well for Malmö FF during the 2014 season, by the time of the summer break for the 2014 World Cup he had scored eight goals and made three assists in twelve appearances. However, on 27 June he injured his cruciate ligament in a friendly fixture against FK Partizan, Molins had acquired the same injury in the corresponding knee at Anderlecht in 2011. The injury meant that Molins would have to go through an operation and go into rehabilitation training for the rest of the season. In his absence, the club went on to defend their league title successfully after Malmö FF beat AIK 3–2 on 5 October 2014.

The 2015 season saw Molins continuing to recover from his injury, as his captaincy role saw him replaced by Rosenberg, but he was given the vice–captain role nevertheless. Molins also revealed that the contract negotiations is still ongoing, but his agent later denied that the contract was a done deal, saying there's no breakthrough yet. By May, he revealed that his recovery is going well and that his doctor given him an all clear to play. Molins made his first appearance in almost year, appearing for Malmö FF U21 against Halmstads BK U21 on 12 May 2015, starting a match and played 38 minutes before being substituted, in a 2–2 draw. It wasn't until on 7 June 2015 when he made his first appearance in the first team against Djurgården, coming on as a second-half substitute, in a 1–1 draw. Due to just recovering from his injury, Molins found his playing time for the club, mostly coming from the substitute bench for the rest of the 2015 season. During Malmö FF U21 match against IFK Norrköping on 16 September 2015, he suffered a rupture in the outer ligament in the foot that saw him sidelined for the rest of the 2015 season.

Ahead of the 2016 season, Molins was linked a move away from Malmö FF, as his contract set to expire in June. In response, the club were determined to find a solution to keep him. Amid to the contract situation, he recovered from injury and returned to full training. Molins made his first appearance for Malmö FF in four months, coming on as an 83rd-minute substitute, in a 2–1 win against IK Sirius in the Svenska Cupen. Two weeks later on 5 March 2016, he scored his first goals for the club, in a 4–0 win against GIF Sundsvall. Since returning from injury, Molins found his playing time, mostly from the substitute bench. It wasn't until on 11 April 2016 when he scored his third goal of the season, in a 2–1 loss against GIF Sundsvall. On 5 May 2016, Molins appeared in the Svenska Cupen Final against BK Häcken, coming on as a 100th-minute substitute, and was the first penalty taker to successfully convert the kick, as Malmö FF lost 6–5 in a penalty shoot–out following a 2–2 draw. Nine days later on 14 May 2016, he scored twice for the club, in a 3–0 win against Gefle. However, Molins, once again, suffered a groin injury that saw him miss the remaining matches in the first half of the season. It was announced on 27 June 2016 that Molins left the club when he chose not to extend his contract with Malmö FF. By the time Molins left the club, he went on to make fourteen appearances and scoring five times in all competitions. Following his departure from Malmö FF, Molins' contributions helped the club win the league.

=== Beijing Renhe ===
On 7 July 2016, Molins who recently left Malmö FF when he chose not to extend his contract with the club, has signed a one-plus-two year contract with the Chinese club Beijing Renhe. Upon joining the club, Molins’ salary reportedly to be ten times more in salary than his time at Malmö FF.

He made his Beijing Renhe debut, starting the whole game, in a 3–1 loss against Dalian Transcendence on 16 July 2016. Molins then set up two goals in two matches between 21 August 2016 and 27 August 2016 against Wuhan Zall and Xinjiang Tianshan Leopard. At the end of the 2016 season, Molins went on to make thirteen appearances in all competitions. Following this, he left the club and spoke about his time in the country, saying: "First it was China and it was special. Football came second. It was really just money it was about and it was not something I enjoyed. I signed a 2.5-year contract and broke after six months."

=== Panathinaikos ===
On 8 February 2017, Panathinaikos officially announced the signing of Swedish striker, who was recently released from Beijing Renhe.

On 1 March 2017, he made his debut with the club in the quarter final Greek Cup second-leg game against Asteras Tripolis. After the match, Manager Spyros Marangos praised his performance. However, Molins found his playing time, mostly coming from the substitute bench. On 23 April 2017, he scored his first goal with Panathinaikos against Atromitos in the home win with 1–0 for day 29 of Greek Super League. On 31 May 2017, Molins scored in the away win 2–3 against PAOK for the last day of the Greek Super League Play-Offs. At the end of the 2016–17 season, he went on to make eleven appearances and scoring eleven times in all competitions.

On 27 July 2017, Molins started the 2017–18 season well when he scored the only goal, as Panathinaikos won 1–0 at home against Gabala for the 1st leg of the 3rd Qualification Round of 2017–18 UEFA Europa League. In a return leg, he set up one of the club's goals, in a 2–1 win to help Panathinaikos advance to the next round. Since the start of the 2017–18 season, Molins quickly regained his first team place, playing in the striker position. He then scored two more goals throughout September against AEL and PAS Giannina. On 21 October 2017, Molins scored the equalizer in a 1–1 away draw against Lamia. Three days later he scored a 90-minute winner in a 2–1 away match against Anagennisi Karditsa for the Greek Cup, ensuring his team's position to the round of 16. Molins later added two more goals by the end of the year, scoring against Atromitos and Lamia. On 18 January 2018, according to doctors' diagnosis, Molins will remain out of action until March with sports hernia. It wasn't until on 10 March 2018 when he returned to the first team, coming on as a 72nd-minute substitute, in a 1–1 draw against Asteras Tripolis. A month later on 22 April 2018, Molin scored his scored his eighth goal of the season, in a 3–0 win against Panionios. At the end of the 2017–18 season, he went on to make twenty–five appearances and scoring five times in all competitions.

When Molins contract set to expire at the end of the 2017–18 season, he announced his intention to leave Panathinaikos. However, the club was keen on extending his contract before Molins left Panathinaikos.

=== Second return to Malmö FF ===
On 25 July 2018, Molins signed a three-year contract with his former club Malmö FF, keeping him until 2021.

However, he never featured for the club's league matches for the rest of the 2018 season, due to his fitness concern and was left out of the squad both the league and European competitions despite his determination to return to full fitness. It wasn't until on 22 November 2018 when Molins made his only appearance of the season against Lund in the Svenska Cupen and scored Malmö FF's second goal of the game, in a 2–0 win.

At the start of the 2019 season, Molins continued to find himself in and out of the starting line–up for Malmö FF. It wasn't until on 28 April 2019 when he scored his first goal of the season, in a 1–1 draw against IFK Norrköping. A month later on 25 May 2019, Molins scored twice for the club, as well as, setting up one of the goals, in a 5–0 win against AFC Eskilstuna. He then scored in both legs against Ballymena United in the UEFA Europa League first round, as Malmö FF won 11–0 on aggregate to advance to the next round. This was followed up by scoring his scoring the opening goal of the game, having come on as a 54th-minute substitute, in a 1–1 draw against Djurgårdens. A month later on 18 August 2019, Molins scored his seventh goal of the season, in a 5–0 win against Falkenberg. He then played in both legs of the play–offs round against Bnei Yehuda Tel Aviv and scored in the second leg to help the club win 4–0 on aggregate to advance past the 2019–20 UEFA Europa League group stages. Molins later added two more goals in the 2019 season, coming against IF Elfsborg, FC Lugano and IFK Värnamo. In the last two remaining matches of the 2019 season, he set up three goals in two matches, as Malmö FF finished second place in the league trailing league winners Djurgårdens by one point. At the end of the 2019 season, Molins went on to make thirty–eight appearances and scoring eleven times in all competitions.

At the start of the 2020 season, Molins was given a number nine shirt following the retirement of Rosenberg. He started the season well by scoring his first goal of the season, as well as, setting up three times, in an 8–0 win against Syrianska in the Svenska Cupen. Two weeks later on 1 March 2020, Molins scored his second goal of the season, in a 2–1 win against FK Karlskrona. However, due to the pandemic, the season was pushed back to three months. It wasn't until on 18 June 2020 when he scored his third goal of the season, in a 1–1 draw against BK Häcken. However, Molins continued to find his playing time from the substitute bench. Despite wanting to end his football career at Malmö FF, he had his contract at Malmö FF terminated by mutual consent.

=== Sarpsborg 08 ===
It was announced on 16 September 2020 that Molins signed for Eliteserien side Sarpsborg 08 until the end of the 2020 season.

He made his debut for the club, coming on as a 38th-minute substitute, in a 0–0 draw against Strømsgodset on 26 September 2020. In a follow–up match, Molins set up one of the goals for Sarpsborg 08 FF, in a 4–0 win against Stabæk. At the end of the 2020 season, he went on to make five appearances in all competitions.

== International career ==
Molins is eligible to play for Sweden (through his father) and Uruguay (through his mother and the country he was born).

=== Youth career ===
In March 2007, Molins was called up to the Sweden U19 squad for the first time. He made his debut for the U19 side, in a 1–1 draw against Slovakia U19 on 27 March 2007. Two days later on 29 March 2007, Molins scored his first Sweden U19 goal, in a 1–1 draw against Slovakia U19. He went on to make four appearances for Sweden U19.

In May 2008, Molins was called up to the Sweden U21 for the first time. He made his U21 debut on 25 May 2008 when Sweden U21 played Portugal U21, as they drew 0–0. After the match, Sydsvenskan praised his debut performance. It wasn't until on 5 September 2008 when Molin scored his first goal for the U21 side, in a 1–0 win against Poland U21. In May 2009, he was selected for the UEFA European Under-21 Championship in Sweden. Molins started the tournament when he set up one of the goals in a 5–1 win against Belarus U21 on 16 June 2009. It wasn't until 26 June 2009 when Molins made his second appearance of the tournament, coming against England U21. He set up Sweden’s third goal of the game to make it 3–3, resulting in a penalty shootout. Molins took the final spot kick, which he missed, resulting in Sweden U21 being eliminated from the tournament. After the match, Molins said that the penalty kick miss resulted in him breaking down in tears and he was supported by his teammates. Following this, he continued to feature for Sweden U21 for the next two years. It wasn't until 7 October 2010 when Molins scored his second U21 national team goal, in a 4–1 loss against Switzerland U21. He went on to make twenty–three appearances and scored two times for Sweden U21.

=== Senior career ===
Having initially desire to play for Uruguay, Molins was called up to the Sweden squad for the first time. He made his debut for Sweden against Oman as a part of Sweden's winter tour on 20 January 2010. In January 2011, Molins was called up to the national team squad once again. He made two starts, coming against Botswana and South Africa on 19 January 2011 and 22 January 2011 respectively.

Three years later in January 2014, Molins was called up to the Sweden squad for the first time. His first appearance for the national side came on 17 January 2014 against Moldova, where he played 71 minutes before substituted, as Sweden won 2–1. Four days later on 21 January 2014, Molins scored his first goal for Sweden after coming on as a second-half substitute, in a 2–0 win against Iceland.

== Personal life ==
Molins has a dual citizenship of Sweden and Uruguay. Growing up in Sweden since he moved to the country at age four, Molins grew up in a city of Kävlinge. He also grew up supporting Nacional and Serie A side Inter Milan.

Molins spoke about politics in Sweden, saying: "There are no limits. The atmosphere is wonderful and therefore it goes well for us." In addition to speaking Swedish, he also speaks French, having learnt the language at school.

== Career statistics ==
=== Club ===
Appearances and goals by club, season and competition
Club	Season	League			Cup		Continental		Other		Total	
Club	Season	Division	Apps	Goals	Apps	Goals	Apps	Goals	Apps	Goals	Apps	Goals
Malmö FF	2006	Allsvenskan	5	0	0	0	—		—		5	0
Malmö FF	2007	Allsvenskan	9	0	2	0	—		—		11	0
Malmö FF	2008	Allsvenskan	27	2	3	2	—		—		30	4
Malmö FF	2009	Allsvenskan	28	3	1	0	—		—		29	4
Malmö FF	2010	Allsvenskan	28	7	2	1	—		—		30	8
Malmö FF	2011	Allsvenskan	9	3	2	1	0	0	1	0	12	4
Malmö FF	Total		106	15	10	4	0	0	1	0	117	19
Anderlecht	2011–12	Belgian Pro League	4	0	0	0	0	0	—		4	0
Anderlecht	2012–13	Belgian Pro League	3	0	2	0	2	1	—		7	1
Anderlecht	Total		7	0	2	0	2	1	—		11	1
Real Betis (loan)	2012–13	La Liga	4	0	1	0	—		—		5	0
Malmö FF	2013	Allsvenskan	11	8	1	0	0	0	1	1	13	9
Malmö FF	2014	Allsvenskan	11	8	4	5	0	0	—		15	13
Malmö FF	2015	Allsvenskan	7	0	0	0	0	0	—		7	0
Malmö FF	2016	Allsvenskan	7	3	6	2	—		—		13	5
Malmö FF	Total		36	19	11	7	0	0	1	1	48	27
Beijing Renhe	2016	China League One	14	0	0	0	—		—		14	0
Panathinaikos	2016–17	Super League Greece	8	2	3	0	—		—		11	2
Panathinaikos	2017–18	Super League Greece	17	4	4	3	4	1	—		25	8
Panathinaikos	Total		25	6	7	3	4	1	—		36	10
Malmö FF	2018	Allsvenskan	0	0	1	1	0	0	—		1	1
Malmö FF	2019	Allsvenskan	26	6	1	1	11	4	—		38	11
Malmö FF	2020	Allsvenskan	10	1	6	2	0	0	—		16	3
Malmö FF	Total		36	7	8	4	11	4	—		55	15
Sarpsborg 08	2020	Eliteserien	5	0	0	0	—		—		5	0
Rosenborg	2021	Eliteserien	10	2	0	0	—		—		10	2
Sarpsborg 08	2021	Eliteserien	4	0	0	0	—		—		4	0
Sarpsborg 08	2022	Eliteserien	26	6	3	3	—		—		29	9
Sarpsborg 08	Total		30	6	3	3	—		—		33	9
Career total			273	55	42	21	17	6	2	1	334	84

=== International ===
Appearances and goals by national team and year
National team	Year	Apps	Goals
Sweden	2010	2	0
Sweden	2011	2	0
Sweden	2012	0	0
Sweden	2013	0	0
Sweden	2014	2	1
Total		6	1

International goals

#	Date	Venue	Opponent	Score	Result	Competition
1.	21 January 2014	Mohammed Bin Zayed Stadium, Abu Dhabi, United Arab Emirates	Iceland	2–0	2–0	Friendly

== Honours ==
Malmö FF

- Allsvenskan: 2010, 2013, 2014, 2016, 2020
- Svenska Supercupen: 2013

R.S.C. Anderlecht

- Belgian First Division : 2011–12, 2012–13
