= Jasmin Sudić =

Swedish footballer

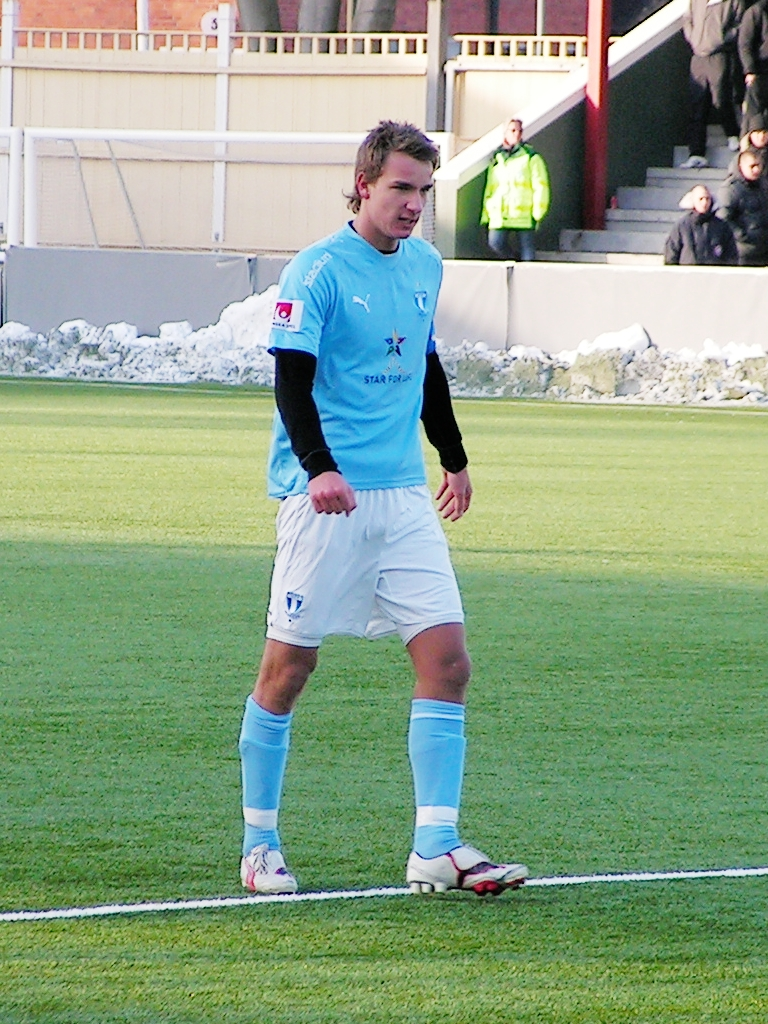
- Sudić playing for Malmö FF in 2010

Personal information
- Full name: Jasmin Sudić
- Date of birth: 24 November 1990 (age 35)
- Place of birth: Bosanski Novi, SFR Yugoslavia
- Height: 1.88 m (6 ft 2 in)
- Position: Centre-back

Youth career
- –2004: BK Olympic
- 2004–2008: Malmö FF

Senior career*
Years	Team	Apps	(Gls)
2008–2014	Malmö FF	34	(0)
2013	→ Mjällby AIF (loan)	11	(0)
2014	Mjällby AIF	13	(0)
2015–2018	BK Häcken	42	(1)
2018–2019	Trelleborgs FF	10	(0)
Total		110	(1)

International career
2007	Sweden U17	2	(0)
2008–2009	Sweden U19	9	(1)
2009	Sweden U21	3	(0)
- * Club domestic league appearances and goals

Jasmin Sudić (born 24 November 1990) is a Swedish former footballer who played as a centre-back.

== Club career ==
He played for FC Malmö, BK Olympic, and Heleneholms SK as a youth before he joined Malmö FF.

=== Malmö FF ===
Sudić made his Allsvenskan debut for Malmö FF in 2008 against Hammarby IF, Malmö FF won the match 6–3. In 2009, he got a breakthrough after fellow defender colleague Jimmy Dixon was sold, Sudić played 18 matches as central defender and played impressively well for such a young player. Sudić missed all but 6 league games in the 2010 season due to a long term knee injury. Sudić managed to recover from the injury but had a backlash when he injured himself again before the 2011 season started. As a result of this he missed the entire season and focused on recover properly for the 2012 season.

Despite his troubles with injuries, Malmö FF wanted to express their trust in Sudić's talent and offered him a new contract until the end of the 2014 season which he accepted, he was also given the number three shirt as part of the new contract. Sudić was back again from his knee injury in time for the 2012 season. He played 9 games in the league and one cup fixture as he found himself in tough competition for the starting spots. This was Sudić's last matches at the club after being sent on loan for the 2013 season and then being sold to Mjällby AIF in the summer of the 2014 season.

=== Mjällby AIF ===
It was announced on 14 January 2013 that Sudić would be on loan to fellow Allsvenskan side Mjällby AIF for the duration of the 2013 season. Sudić quickly became an important player for Mjällby during the pre season and took a place in the starting eleven for the start of the season. He played eleven matches for the club before contracting an injury. It was confirmed on 2 July that the injury was a cruciate ligament injury, his third injury of this sort in his career. The injury meant that Sudic would miss the remainder of the season and his loan spell at Mjällby. Sudić returned to the club on a permanent basis on 23 July 2014, signing a two-year contract.

=== BK Häcken ===
On 9 January 2015, it was announced that Sudić had signed to play for BK Häcken.

=== Trelleborgs FF ===
After a two and a half-year stint at Häcken plagued by injuries, Sudić signed a long term-deal with Trelleborgs FF on 13 July 2018.

== International career ==
Sudić represented Sweden at youth international level, and was considered for the Bosnian senior team.

== Career statistics ==
Club	Season	League			Cup		Continental		Total	
Club	Season	Division	Apps	Goals	Apps	Goals	Apps	Goals	Apps	Goals
Malmö FF	2008	Allsvenskan	1	0	0	0	—		1	0
Malmö FF	2009	Allsvenskan	18	0	0	0	—		18	0
Malmö FF	2010	Allsvenskan	6	0	0	0	—		6	0
Malmö FF	2011	Allsvenskan	0	0	0	0	0	0	0	0
Malmö FF	2012	Allsvenskan	9	0	1	0	—		10	0
Malmö FF	Total		34	0	1	0	0	0	35	0
Mjällby AIF (loan)	2013	Allsvenskan	11	0	2	0	—		13	0
Mjällby AIF	2014	Allsvenskan	13	0	1	0	—		14	0
Mjällby AIF	Total		24	0	3	0	0	0	27	0
BK Häcken	2015	Allsvenskan	19	1	2	0	—		21	1
BK Häcken	2016	Allsvenskan	21	0	2	0	2	0	25	0
BK Häcken	2017	Allsvenskan	2	0	2	1	—		4	1
BK Häcken	Total		42	1	6	1	2	0	50	2
Trelleborgs FF	2018	Allsvenskan	10	0	0	0	—		10	0
Trelleborgs FF	Total		10	0	0	0	0	0	10	0
Career total			110	1	10	1	2	0	122	2

== Honours ==
BK Häcken

- Svenska Cupen: 2015–16
