= David Durmaz =

Swedish footballer (born 1981)

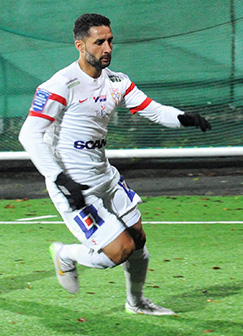
- Durmaz with Assyriska in 2015

Personal information
- Full name: David Durmaz
- Date of birth: 21 December 1981 (age 44)
- Place of birth: Kiruna, Sweden
- Height: 1.76 m (5 ft 9 in)
- Positions: Defender; midfielder

Team information
- Current team: Konyaspor KIF
- Number: 23

Youth career
- FF Södertälje
- Syrianska SK
- 1999–2000: Assyriska FF

Senior career*
Years	Team	Apps	(Gls)
2001–2006	Assyriska FF	106	(0)
2007–2008	GAIS	32	(0)
2009	Malmö FF	1	(0)
2009	Denizlispor	0	(0)
2010	Ljungskile SK	22	(1)
2011	Syrianska FC	21	(0)
2012–2022	Assyriska FF	149	(1)
2023–	Konyaspor KIF	34	(0)
- * Club domestic league appearances and goals as of 30 November 2017

David Durmaz (born 21 December 1981) is a Swedish footballer who plays as a defender for Konyaspor KIF.

Durmaz, of Assyrian origin from southeastern Turkey, also holds Turkish citizenship. He is a relative of Jimmy Durmaz.

Durmaz played for various Swedish clubs before departing from his club Malmö FF to Turkish club Denizlispor in summer 2009. However, there was much trouble surrounding the transfer which resulted in a lack of play time for Durmaz who later left the club in winter 2009. Back in Sweden Durmaz joined newly promoted Syrianska FC and played for them until the 2012 season when he joined local rivals Assyriska Föreningen.
