= Dejan Garača =

Swedish footballer

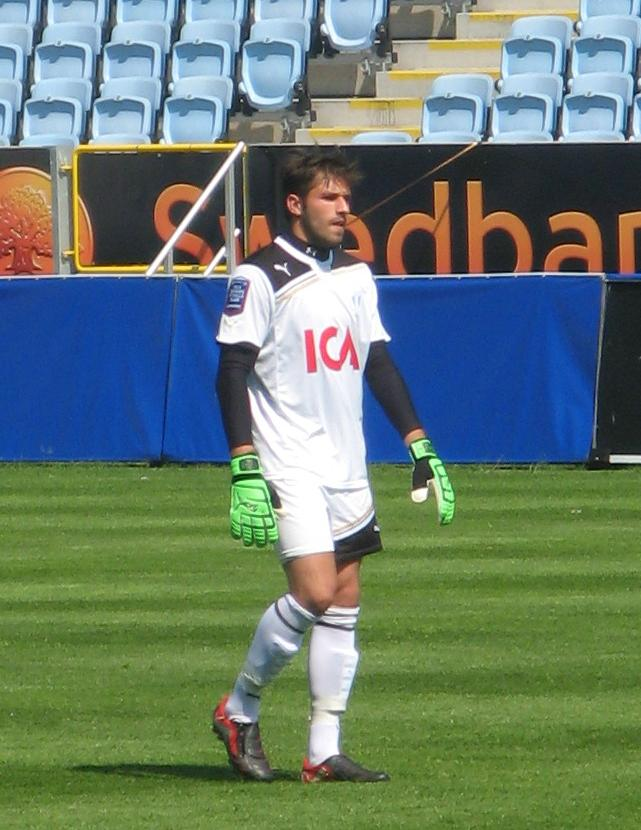

Personal information
- Full name: Dejan Garača
- Date of birth: July 21, 1991 (age 35)
- Place of birth: Örebro, Sweden
- Height: 1.86 m (6 ft 1 in)
- Position: Goalkeeper

Team information
- Current team: Nordic United FC
- Number: 30

Youth career
- –2007: BK Forward

Senior career*
Years	Team	Apps	(Gls)
2007–2008	BK Forward	0	(0)
2008–2011	Malmö FF	3	(0)
2009	→ IFK Malmö (loan)	12	(0)
2011	→ IF Limhamn Bunkeflo (loan)	1	(0)
2012–2016	Syrianska FC	73	(0)
2017	Utenis	10	(0)
2017–2019	Syrianska FC	37	(0)
2020–	Nordic United FC	131	(0)

International career
2006–2008	Sweden U17	8	(0)
2008–2010	Sweden U19	4	(0)
- * Club domestic league appearances and goals as of 24 November 2025

Dejan Garača (born July 21, 1991) is a Swedish football player who plays as a goalkeeper for Nordic United FC.

== Club career ==
Born in Örebro, Garača played for BK Forward before he joined Malmö FF in 2008. During his time at the club he acted as third choice goalkeeper behind Johan Dahlin and Dušan Melichárek. He therefore went on two loan periods to IFK Malmö and IF Limhamn Bunkeflo. Garača was capped three times for Malmö FF in matches where both Dahlin and Melichárek were injured. Malmö FF chose not to offer Garača a new contract after the 2011 season.

On 25 February 2017 Dejan joined Lithuanian A Lyga side Utenis. He became main goalkeeper of the team, appearing in the first 10 league games, but after arrival of new head coach David Campaña was replaced by club's veteran Pavelas Leusas. Utenis released him on 30 June 2017.

== Career statistics ==
As of 23 October 2011

Club performance			League		Cup		Continental		Total	
Season	Club	League	Apps	Goals	Apps	Goals	Apps	Goals	Apps	Goals
Sweden			League		Svenska Cupen		Europe		Total	
2007	BK Forward	Division 1	0	0	—		—		0	0
2008	BK Forward	Division 1	0	0	—		—		0	0
2008	Malmö FF	Allsvenskan	0	0	0	0	—		0	0
2009	IFK Malmö	Division 2	12	0	—		—		12	0
2010	Malmö FF	Allsvenskan	2	0	0	0	—		2	0
2011	Malmö FF	Allsvenskan	1	0	1	0	0	0	2	0
2011	IF Limhamn Bunkeflo	Division 1	1	0	—		—		1	0
Total	Sweden		16	0	1	0	0	0	17	0
Career total			16	0	1	0	0	0	17	0
