= Alexander Nilsson (footballer, born 1992) =

Swedish footballer

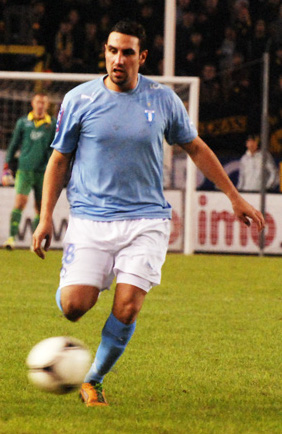
- Nilsson playing for Malmö FF in 2012

Personal information
- Full name: Georgios Alexander Nilsson Likourentzos
- Date of birth: 23 October 1992 (age 34)
- Place of birth: Malmö, Sweden
- Height: 1.75 m (5 ft 9 in)
- Position: Forward

Team information
- Current team: Qormi
- Number: 9

Youth career
- –2006: BK Olympic
- 2007–2008: Malmö FF

Senior career*
Years	Team	Apps	(Gls)
2008–2014	Malmö FF	25	(4)
2009	→ IFK Malmö (loan)	8	(2)
2013	→ Landskrona BoIS (loan)	22	(8)
2014	→ Trelleborgs FF (loan)	22	(11)
2015	Qormi	22	(11)
2016–2019	Tarxien Rainbows	63	(17)
2017	→ Birkirkara (loan)	5	(0)
2018	→ Hamrun Spartans (loan)	10	(5)
2019–2021	Qrendi	8	(4)
2021-2022	St. Andrews	10	(8)
2022-	Qormi	10	(5)

International career
2007–2008	Sweden U17	10	(4)
2009–2010	Sweden U19	2	(1)
- * Club domestic league appearances and goals as of 22 January 2023

Georgios Alexander Nilsson Likourentzos (born 23 October 1992) is a Swedish professional footballer who plays for Qormi as a forward.

== Club career ==
=== Malmö FF ===
Nilsson made his debut for Malmö FF in 2008 only 15 years of age. On 24 May 2010 he made his debut in the starting 11 and scored two goals in the game.

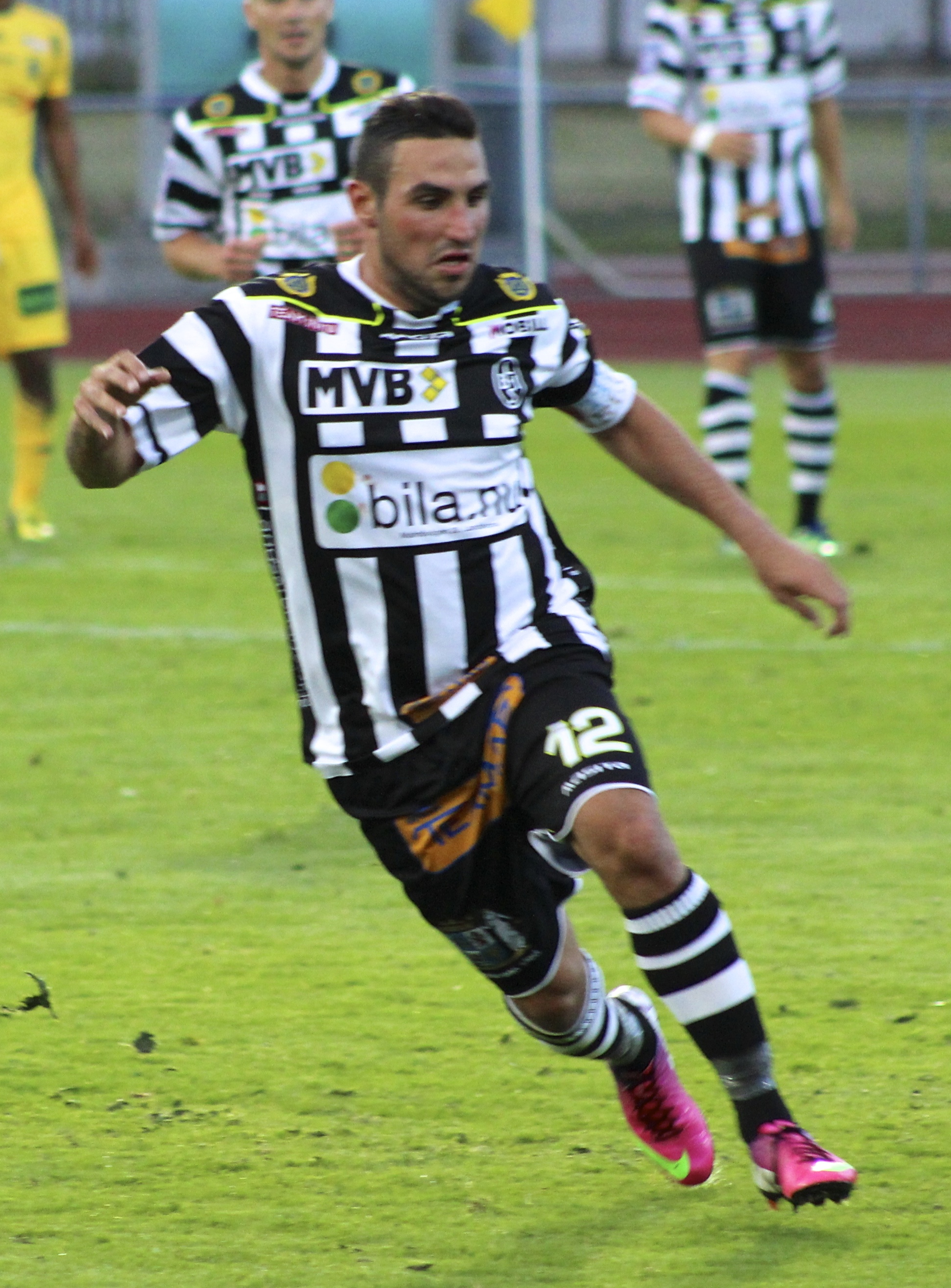
Nilsson, playing for Landskrona BoIS in 2013.

On 14 May 2012 he scored a late equaliser against IFK Göteborg to draw the game at 2-2. On 24 May he scored his 4th goal in Allsvenskan against GIF Sundsvall, a game in which he both came on as a substitute early and was later substituted himself. On 19 July, Nillson scored the winning goal in friendly match over Premier League side West Bromwich Albion. The 2012 season was an overall breakthrough for Nilsson as he played 17 matches in the league and scored two league goals.

=== Landskrona BoIS ===
It was announced on 19 December 2012 that Nilsson would be on loan to Superettan side Landskrona BoIS for the duration of the 2013 season. Nilsson played 22 league matches and scored eight goals during his loan spell at Landskrona.

=== Trelleborgs FF ===
On 14 February 2014 Malmö FF announced that Nilsson would go on loan to Division 1 side Trelleborgs FF for the duration of the 2014 season. Nilsson made 22 league appearances for the club during the loan spell, scoring 11 goals.

=== Qrendi ===
Ahead of the 2019-20 season, Nilsson joined Maltese club Qrendi.

== Career statistics ==
As of 1 November 2014.

Club	Season	League			Cup		Continental		Total	
Club	Season	Division	Apps	Goals	Apps	Goals	Apps	Goals	Apps	Goals
Malmö FF	2008	Allsvenskan	1	0	0	0	—		1	0
Malmö FF	2009	Allsvenskan	0	0	0	0	0	0	0	0
Malmö FF	2010	Allsvenskan	3	2	0	0	—		3	2
Malmö FF	2011	Allsvenskan	4	0	0	0	2	0	6	0
Malmö FF	2012	Allsvenskan	17	2	1	0	—		18	2
Malmö FF	Total		25	4	1	0	2	0	28	4
IFK Malmö (loan)	2009	Division 2	8	2	—		—		8	2
Landskrona BoIS (loan)	2013	Superettan	22	8	4	1	—		26	9
Trelleborgs FF (loan)	2014	Division 1	22	11	0	0	—		22	11
Career total			77	25	5	1	2	0	85	27
