= Rick Kruys =

Dutch football manager (born 1985)

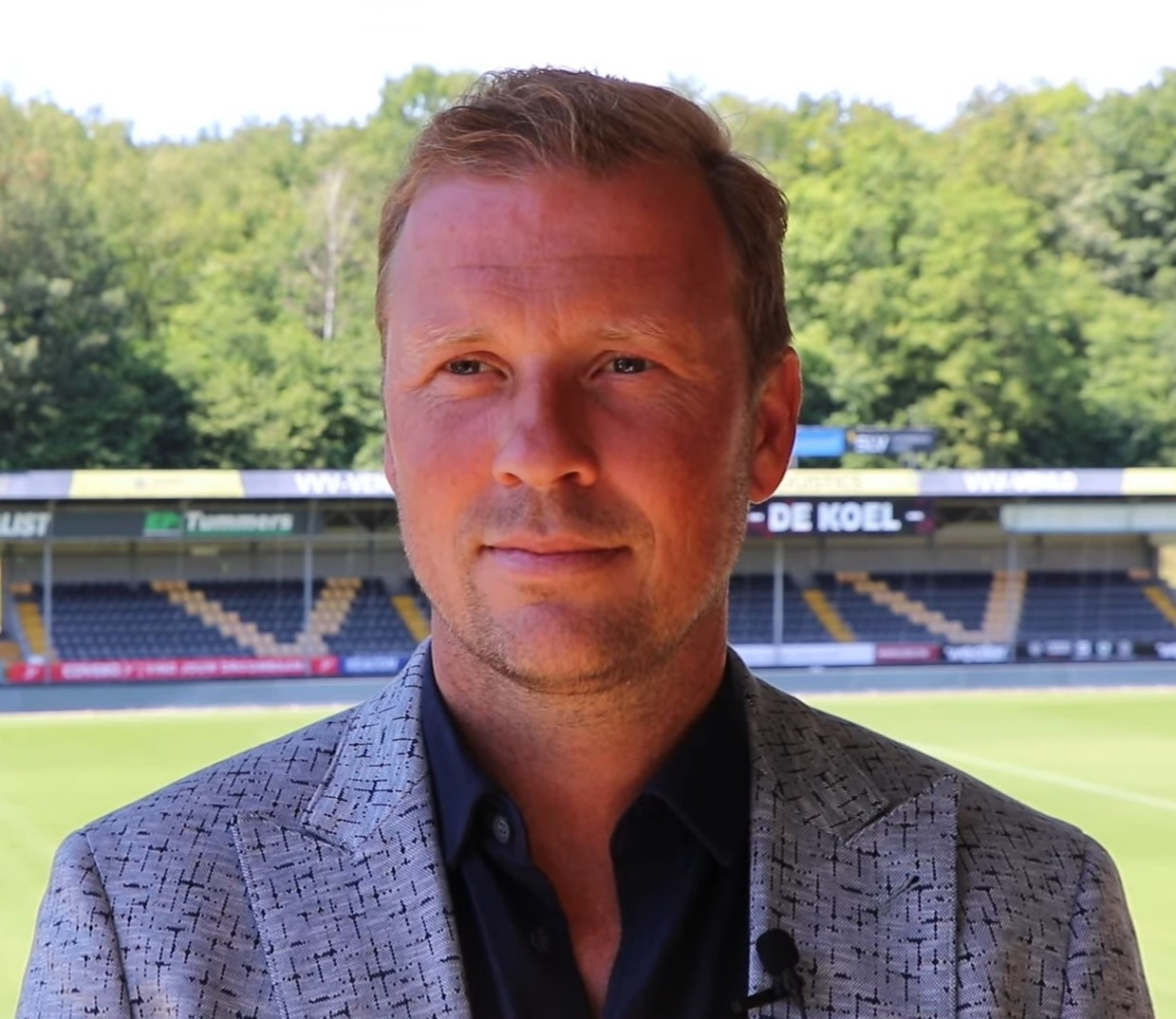
- Kruys in 2022

Personal information
- Date of birth: 9 May 1985 (age 41)
- Place of birth: Utrecht, Netherlands
- Height: 1.77 m (5 ft 10 in)
- Position: Midfielder

Team information
- Current team: NAC Breda (manager)

Youth career
- 1989–1994: USV Holland
- 1995–1996: USV Elinkwijk
- 1997–2003: Utrecht

Senior career*
Years	Team	Apps	(Gls)
2003–2008	Utrecht	103	(6)
2008–2012	Malmö FF	21	(0)
2011–2012	→ Volendam (loan)	37	(4)
2012–2016	Excelsior	112	(3)
2016–2017	De Meern	11	(1)

International career
2005–2006	Netherlands U21	16	(1)

Managerial career
- 2018: Utrecht (caretaker)
- 2022: Utrecht (caretaker)
- 2022–2024: VVV-Venlo
- 2024–2026: Volendam
- 2026–: NAC Breda
- * Club domestic league appearances and goals

Rick Kruys (Dutch pronunciation: [rɪˈkrœys]; born 9 May 1985) is a Dutch professional football manager and former player who is the manager of Eerste Divisie club NAC Breda. His father, Gert Kruys is also a former professional footballer and current manager.

== Club career ==
=== Utrecht ===
Kruys started his professional career in Utrecht in 2003. He played in Utrecht for five years and played over 100 league games. In 2008, Dutch media reported that Kruys would sign a 4 1/2-year contract with Malmö FF, and he eventually joined the team in July 2008.

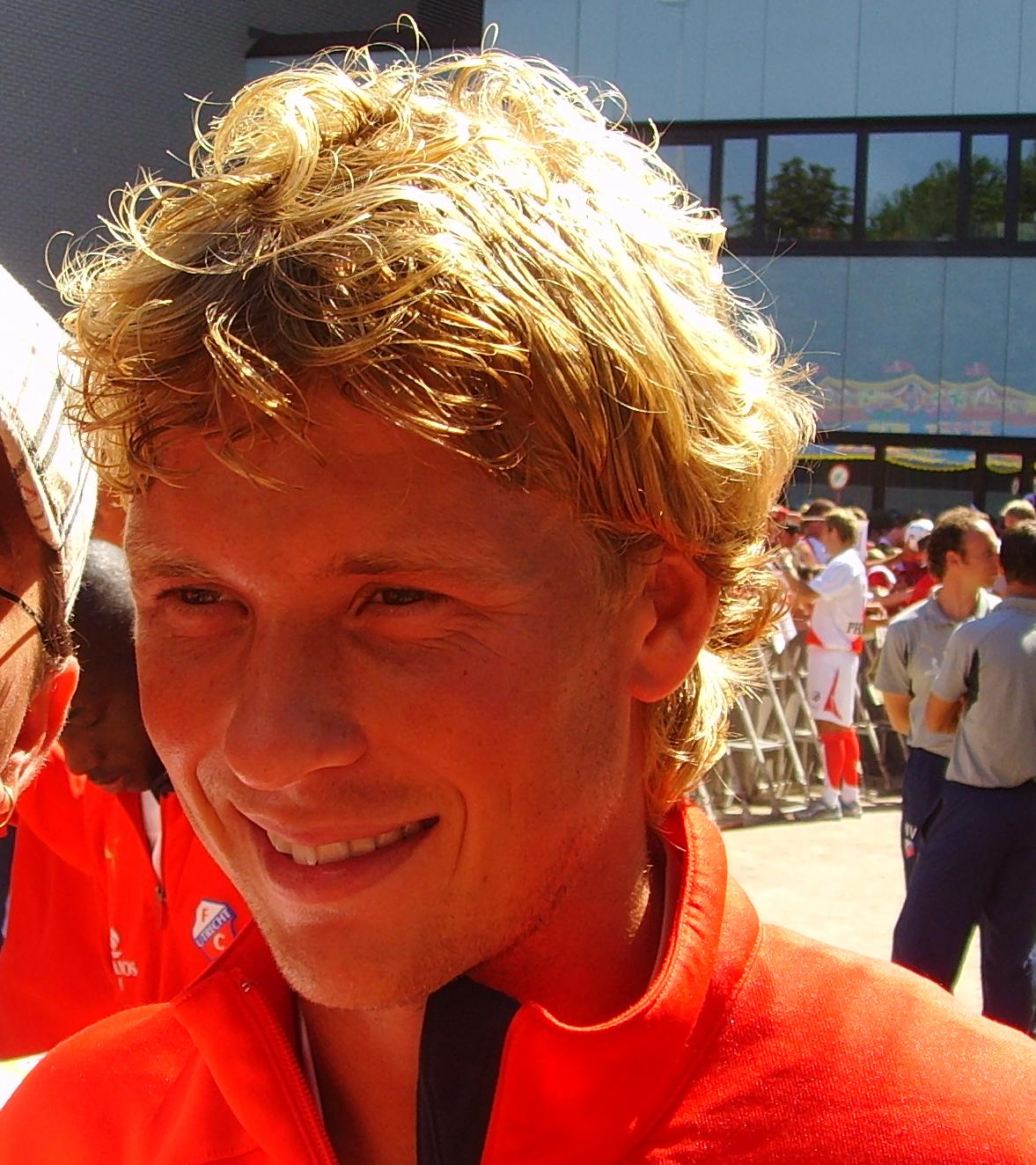
Kruys with Utrecht in 2007

=== Malmö FF ===
Due to injury problems, Kruys would only play four games for his first season at the club. In 2009, Kruys played 13 games for the club in his best season so far at the club, although he was still battling injuries. For the 2010 league-winning season, Kruys once again faced numerous injuries and played only four games. In early 2011 Malmö FF gave Kruys permission to look for a new club to restart his career.

==== Loan to Volendam ====
Kruys was eventually loaned to Volendam until 1 June 2011. When the loan deal expired Kruys returned to Malmö, but was not included in the squad as the club was awaiting eventual bids from clubs in the Netherlands. On 19 July it was announced that Kruys would continue to play for Volendam on loan until the end of the season.

=== Excelsior ===
Kruys signed a two-year contract with Excelsior on 13 July 2012. He was part of Excelsior's promotion to the Eredivisie in the 2013–14 season. He made 122 appearances for the club, scoring five goals, and he announced his retirement from professional football on 7 February 2016.

== International career ==
Kruys has represented the Netherlands under-21 team in 16 games, in which he scored one goal.

== Coaching career ==
During the 2013–14 season, Kruys was working as an individual coach for Utrecht's academy alongside his playing career at Excelsior. He then left the position in 2014 and started working as a youth coach and assistant manager at VV De Meern, still playing for SBV Excelsior beside. Kruys left Excelsior in 2016 and continued at De Meern, now also as player and he was later also hired as a youth coach at Utrecht again.

Retiring from playing football at the end of 2017, Kruys became an assistant coach at Utrecht in January 2018, alongside his former coach Marinus Dijkhuizen and under head coach Jean-Paul de Jong. In May 2018, Kruys signed a new deal until the summer 2023 with Utrecht. After de Jong was fired in September 2018, Kruys and Dijkhuizen were appointed joint-caretaker managers. They were replaced later on the month and Kruys continued as an assistant manager.

== Managerial career ==
=== VVV-Venlo ===
On 16 June 2022, VVV-Venlo appointed Kruys as head coach on a two-year deal, effective from 1 July 2022, replacing Jos Luhukay. In March 2024, he announced his decision not to renew his expiring contract at the end of the season, stating, "It was a very difficult choice, but I feel it's time for a new challenge."

=== Volendam ===
On 4 June 2024, Kruys was announced as head coach of newly relegated Eerste Divisie club Volendam, a club he had also represented during his playing career, signing a two-year contract.

In his first season, Kruys led Volendam to the 2024–25 Eerste Divisie title and immediate promotion to the Eredivisie, the club setting a record of 82 points; he was named coach of the season in the division, receiving the Rinus Michels Award. His contract was subsequently extended to 2028.

Volendam began their return to the top flight strongly but faded late in the 2025–26 season; a final-day home defeat to Telstar left them 16th and consigned them to the relegation play-offs, where they lost to Willem II on penalties and were relegated. Kruys and the club parted by mutual agreement on 27 May 2026, with two years still remaining on his contract.

=== NAC Breda ===
On 8 September 2026, Kruys was hired by NAC Breda for two seasons, NAC was also recently relegated to Eerste Divisie.

== Managerial statistics ==
As of match played 3 October 2026

Managerial record by team and tenure
Team	From	To	Record				
Team	From	To	G	W	D	L	Win %
Utrecht (caretaker)	22 March 2022	30 June 2022	9	2	4	3	22.22
VVV-Venlo	1 July 2022	30 June 2024	83	31	21	31	37.35
FC Volendam	1 July 2024	30 June 2026	80	39	12	29	48.75
NAC Breda	8 September 2026	Present	4	2	1	1	50.00
Career total			176	74	38	64	42.05

== Honours ==
Utrecht

- Johan Cruyff Shield: 2004
