= Dušan Melichárek =

Czech footballer (born 1983)

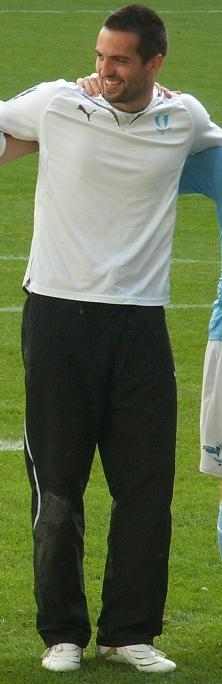

Personal information
- Date of birth: 29 November 1983 (age 42)
- Place of birth: Vyškov, Czechoslovakia
- Height: 1.96 m (6 ft 5 in)
- Position: Goalkeeper

Youth career
- Slovácko

Senior career*
Years	Team	Apps	(Gls)
2003–2005	Slovácko		
2004–2005	→ FC Veselí nad Moravou (loan)	37	(0)
2005–2008	Mjällby	54	(0)
2008	→ Malmö FF (loan)	0	(0)
2008–2011	Malmö FF	32	(0)
2012–2015	Slovácko	50	(0)
2015–2018	Inter Zaprešić	0	(0)
2015-2018	→ Zbrojovka Brno (loan)	103	(0)
2018–2019	Zbrojovka Brno	16	(0)
2019–2020	Malmö FF	2	(0)
- * Club domestic league appearances and goals as of 7 February 2021

Dušan Melichárek (born 29 November 1983) is a Czech footballer and a goalkeeper who last played for Malmö FF in the Swedish top flight.

== Career ==
=== Malmö FF ===
Melichárek came to Malmö FF in the beginning of 2008 on loan from Mjällby. He was bought by the club after a successful loan period. He acted as reserve goalkeeper behind Jonas Sandqvist and later behind Johan Dahlin. However, he played for the majority of the matches during the 2011 season because of a long-term injury on Dahlin and participated in Malmö FF's campaign to qualify for the 2011–12 UEFA Champions League, the club was eventually knocked out in the play-off round. Melichárek chose not to renew his contract with Malmö FF after the 2011 season and to search for a new club. He eventually signed for his youth club 1. FC Slovácko.

After a spell at FC Zbrojovka Brno, where he played four years, Melichárek moved back abroad again to Sweden, rejoining Malmö FF prior to the 2019 season. This meant he once more formed part of the goalkeeping team with Dahlin, who also had returned to the club earlier after a spell abroad. Sporting director Daniel Andersson cited Melichárek's familiarity with the club and also having worked with Dahlin and goalkeeper coach Jonnie Fedel before as a key part in the recruitment of Melichárek.
