= Labinot Harbuzi =

Swedish footballer

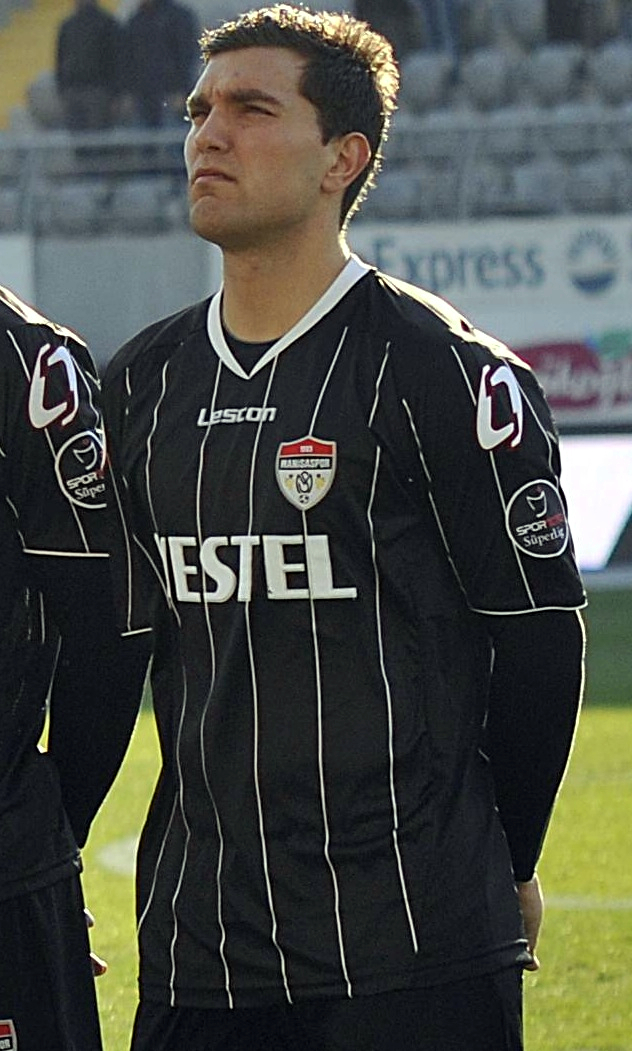

Personal information
- Date of birth: 4 April 1986
- Place of birth: Lund, Sweden
- Date of death: 11 October 2018 (aged 32)
- Place of death: Malmö, Sweden
- Height: 1.80 m (5 ft 11 in)
- Position: Attacking midfielder

Youth career
- 1996–1998: Malmö BI
- 1999–2000: Falkenbergs FF
- 2000–2001: Malmö FF
- 2002–2004: Feyenoord

Senior career*
| Years | Team | Apps | (Gls) |
| 2003–2006 | Feyenoord | 0 | (0) |
| 2004–2005 | → Excelsior (loan) | 9 | (0) |
| 2006–2009 | Malmö FF | 50 | (4) |
| 2009–2011 | Gençlerbirliği | 40 | (4) |
| 2012 | Manisaspor | 5 | (0) |
| 2012 | Syrianska | 3 | (0) |
| 2013 | KSF Prespa Birlik | 5 | (2) |
| 2016 | Melaka United | 11 | (2) |
| Total | | 123 | (12) |

International career
| 2001–2003 | Sweden U17 | 20 | (5) |
| 2004 | Sweden U19 | 5 | (1) |
| 2006–2009 | Sweden U21 | 6 | (1) |
- * Club domestic league appearances and goals

Labinot Harbuzi (4 April 1986 – 11 October 2018) was a Swedish professional footballer who played as a midfielder.

== Early life ==
Harbuzi's family migrated to Sweden. His father, Ismet, was a table tennis player in Kosovo. He was the cousin (aunt's son) of the Kosovar judoka Majlinda Kelmendi.

== Club career ==
=== Early career ===
Growing up in the Malmö district Rosengård, he began his career with Malmö BI, the same club where Zlatan Ibrahimović began his career. Being a very hot prospect in his young years, he was spotted by Swedish Malmö FF.

=== Feyenoord ===
At 15 years old, he was signed by Dutch club Feyenoord where he started playing professional football in the club's reserve team and youth team. In 2005, he was loaned to their satellite club Excelsior where he played 9 league games.

=== Malmö FF ===
In the spring of 2006, he returned to Malmö FF and made his Allsvenskan debut that same year. In 2009, he made history when he became the first goalscorer in the then newly built Swedbank Stadion.

=== Gençlerbirliği ===
On 11 July 2009, Harbuzi signed with the Turkish club Gençlerbirliği. His contract with the side started in January 2010, when his contract with Malmö FF expired. He scored five goals, gaining eleven assists, a promising returning for a Bosman signing. He has received great praise from Gençlerbirliği fans and head coach, Fuat Çapa. He left Gençlerbirliği on 20 December 2011, after coming to a mutual agreement with the club to terminate his contract.

=== Melaka United ===
Harbuzi joined Malaysian Premier League club Melaka United on 13 November 2015. He missed the first 5 league matches of the 2016 season due to a pre-season injury. He made immediate impact on his first appearance for Melaka United, when he produced an assist in the second minute for teammate Ilija Spasojević to equalise against UiTM. He went on to score a goal on his debut in the 46th minute in the match, which Melaka United dominated and eventually won 3–1. He was however released by Melaka United at the end of 2016, playing only one season for the club.

== International career ==
He was a Swedish under-21 international, making his debut against Republic of Ireland on 28 February 2006. He also played in the 2009 UEFA European Under-21 Football Championship.

In 2011, Harbuzi declared to the media in two different interviews that, given his ethnicity and also his feelings about being an Albanian, he desired to be part of Albania's national football team in the future and was eagerly awaiting a convocation and had been in contact with the Albanian Football Association.

== Death ==
On 11 October 2018, Harbuzi died. According to his friend, fellow footballer Paweł Cibicki, who had met with him the previous day, Harbuzi did not show any signs of illness. During the next morning, Harbuzi suffered cardiac arrest and was found in a critical condition by his father. His parents performed CPR, which was continued when an ambulance crew arrived. He was transported by ambulance to the hospital, where he was pronounced dead. His father said that he did not know if Harbuzi was alive when he left in the ambulance. Harbuzi was 32 years old.

== Honours ==
Melaka United

- Malaysia Premier League: 2016
