= Jeffrey Aubynn =

Swedish football manager (born 1977)

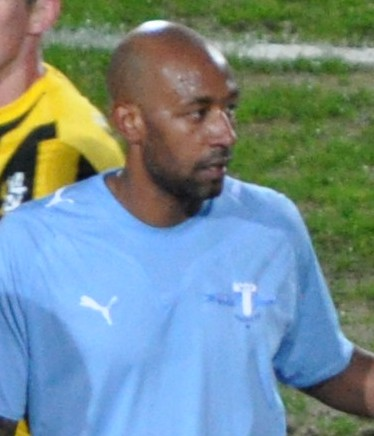

Personal information
- Full name: Isaac Jeffrey Eric Aubynn
- Date of birth: 12 May 1977 (age 49)
- Place of birth: Gothenburg, Sweden
- Height: 1.83 m (6 ft 0 in)
- Positions: Midfielder; winger

Team information
- Current team: Malmö FF (head of scouting)

Youth career
- –1997: Gunnilse

Senior career*
Years	Team	Apps	(Gls)
1997–1998	Bayern Munich II	9	(1)
1998–2000	Halmstads BK	35	(3)
2001–2003	Örgryte IS	54	(10)
2004–2005	AGF	29	(4)
2005–2007	Hammarby IF	42	(5)
2007	Aalesund	11	(5)
2008–2011	Malmö FF	78	(6)
2012–2013	GAIS	22	(1)
Total		258	(34)

International career
2000–2001	Sweden U21	7	(0)
2001–2007	Sweden	7	(0)

Managerial career
- 2014: GAIS (U17)
- 2015–2017: Malmö FF (U17)
- 2018–2020: Malmö FF (U19)
- 2021–2022: Malmö FF (assistant)
- 2023: Örgryte IS
- 2024–: Malmö FF (head of scouting)
- * Club domestic league appearances and goals

Isaac Jeffrey Eric Aubynn (born 12 May 1977) is a Swedish professional football coach and former player who is currently the head of scouting for Allsvenskan club Malmö FF. During his playing career he played as a midfielder.

Aubynn played in Sweden, Germany, Denmark, and Norway during a career that spanned between 1997 and 2014. He won seven caps for the Sweden national team between 2001 and 2007.

== Club career ==
=== Early career ===
Born in Gothenburg, Aubynn started his career in Gunnilse IS where he played until 1997 when German giants Bayern Munich signed him, after one year in the Bundesliga he returned to Sweden and Halmstads BK in 1998.

=== Halmstad BK ===
Aubynn stayed with HBK for 2 seasons, winning Allsvenskan in 2000, before he signed for Allsvenskan rivals Örgryte IS in 2001, in 2003 he moved to the Danish Danish Superliga and the club AGF, he stayed in Denmark until 2005 when he signed for the Stockholm club Hammarby IF, in 2006 he got into a disagreement about signing a new contract with Hammarby

=== Aalesunds FK ===
Aubynn was eventually sold in 2007 to the Norwegian club Aalesund where he signed a contract until the end of the season. He helped Aalesund from relegation threat, scoring 5 and assisting 2 in the process. He left the club after the season as agreed in order to find himself a bigger club.

=== Malmö FF ===
In December rumors surfaced linking Aubynn with Swedish club Malmö FF. He eventually signed a two-year contract with the team. Aubynn stayed in Malmö FF for four seasons before leaving the club in December 2011 after coming to a mutual agreement with the club not to renew his contract. Whilst playing for Malmo FF, he won the Allsvenskan in 2010 for the second in his career after 10 years of winning it with Halmstad BK.

== International career ==
Aubynn has represented both the U-21 and the Sweden national team, on 14 February 2001 he played in his debut for the Blågult at King's Cup.

== Managerial career ==
=== First step into coaching ===
Aubynn went into coaching after he retired from football. With his first official appointment being given the role to coach Malmo FF U17 youth team. He was subsequently promoted to the U19 team in 2018.

In December 2020, the Swedish top-flight side, Malmö FF announced the appointment of Aubynn as assistant coach to Jon Dahl Tomasson. The former Malmo FF midfielder replaced Daniel Bäckström, who left for IK Sirius. Aubynn was promoted from the club's U19 team, where he served as head coach for 2 years.

== Career statistics ==
As of 15 December 2011

Club	Club performance		League		Cup		Continental		Total	
Club	Season	League	Apps	Goals	Apps	Goals	Apps	Goals	Apps	Goals
Bayern Munich II	1997–98	Regionalliga Süd	9	1	—		—		9	1
Halmstads BK	1998	Allsvenskan	7	0	—		—		7	0
Halmstads BK	1999	Allsvenskan	14	1	—		—		14	1
Halmstads BK	2000	Allsvenskan	14	2	—		—		14	2
Halmstads BK	Total		35	3					35	3
Örgryte IS	2001	Allsvenskan	25	5	—		—		25	5
Örgryte IS	2002	Allsvenskan	22	5	—		—		22	5
Örgryte IS	2003	Allsvenskan	7	0	—		—		7	0
Örgryte IS	Total		52	10					52	10
AGF	2003–04	Superliga	16	1	—		—		16	1
AGF	2004–05	Superliga	13	3	—		—		13	3
AGF	Total		29	4					29	4
Hammarby IF	2005	Allsvenskan	17	4	—		—		17	4
Hammarby IF	2006	Allsvenskan	23	1	—		—		23	1
Hammarby IF	2007	Allsvenskan	2	0	—		0	0	2	0
Hammarby IF	Total		42	5					42	5
Aalesund	2007	Tippeligaen	11	5	—		—		11	5
Malmö FF	2008	Allsvenskan	26	3	1	0	—		27	3
Malmö FF	2009	Allsvenskan	10	0	0	0	—		10	0
Malmö FF	2010	Allsvenskan	20	1	1	0	—		21	1
Malmö FF	2011	Allsvenskan	22	1	2	0	8	0	32	1
Malmö FF	Total		78	5	4	0	8	0	80	5
GAIS	2012	Allsvenskan	0	0	0	0	—		0	0
Career total			258	34	4	0	8	0	270	34

== Honours ==
Halmstad BK

- Allsvenskan: 2000

Malmö FF

- Allsvenskan: 2010
