= Gabriel (footballer, born 1983) =

Brazilian footballer

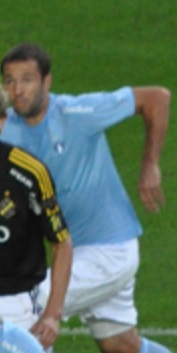
- Malmö FF in 2009

Personal information
- Full name: Gabriel de Paulo Limeira
- Date of birth: 20 August 1983 (age 43)
- Place of birth: Mauá, Brazil
- Height: 1.90 m (6 ft 3 in)
- Position: Centre-back

Senior career*
Years	Team	Apps	(Gls)
2002–2003	AD São Caetano		
2003–2006	EC Santo André		
2005	→ EC Bahia (loan)		
2006	→ Fortaleza (loan)		
2006–2009	Malmö FF	76	(1)
2010	Manisaspor	6	(0)
2011	Botafogo (SP)	13	(0)
2011	Sport Recife	25	(2)
2012	Atlético Goianiense	9	(0)
2013	Fortaleza	15	(1)
2014	Botafogo (SP)	0	(0)
2014–2018	CRB	117	(7)
2018	Água Santa	6	(0)
2019–2020	Villa Nova	10	(1)
- * Club domestic league appearances and goals

Gabriel de Paulo Limeira, or simply Gabriel, (born 20 August 1983) is a Brazilian former professional footballer. Gabriel normally played as a central defender, but was also apt to play left-back or as a defensive midfielder.

== Club career ==
Gabriel previously played for Malmö FF in Allsvenskan and Associação Desportiva São Caetano and Fortaleza Esporte Clube in the Campeonato Brasileiro.

He played for Turkish club Manisaspor for which he signed in 2009. Towards the end of semester, he went back to his country Brazil.

For 2011 new season, he signed the contract with the club Botafogo and joined Sport Recife on a free transfer on 17 May 2011.

In 2012 January, Gabriel moved from Sport to Atlético Goianiense.
