= Robin Nilsson =

Swedish footballer

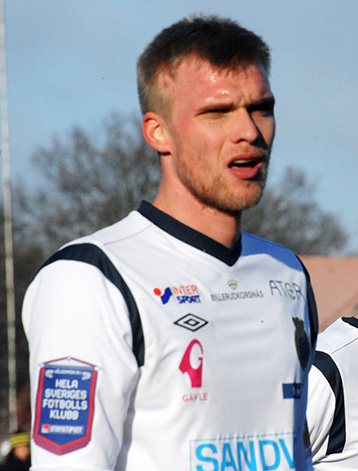

Personal information
- Full name: Robin André Nilsson
- Date of birth: September 15, 1988 (age 38)
- Place of birth: Tomelilla, Sweden
- Height: 1.82 m (6 ft 0 in)
- Position: Midfielder

Team information
- Current team: Ängelholms FF
- Number: 7

Youth career
- –2004: Tomelilla IF
- 2005–2006: Malmö FF

Senior career*
Years	Team	Apps	(Gls)
2006–2010	Malmö FF	13	(0)
2008	→ IFK Malmö (loan)	10	(2)
2009	→ Ängelholms FF (loan)	27	(0)
2010–2013	Ängelholms FF	95	(3)
2013	→ Lyngby BK (loan)	13	(0)
2014–2016	Gefle IF	88	(1)
2017–2019	Trelleborgs FF	68	(1)
2020–	Ängelholms FF	108	(0)

International career
2006–2007	Sweden U19	6	(0)
- * Club domestic league appearances and goals as of 1 January 2025

Robin Nilsson (born September 15, 1988 in Tomelilla) is a Swedish footballer who plays for Ängelholms FF in Ettan-Södra.

== Career ==
=== Club career ===
On 17 October 2019 it was confirmed, that Nilsson would return home to Ängelholms FF for the 2020 season.
