= Adam Eriksson (footballer, born 1988) =

Swedish footballer (born 1988)

Personal information
- Full name: Adam Daniel Eriksson
- Date of birth: 2 February 1988 (age 38)
- Place of birth: Sweden
- Height: 1.87 m (6 ft 2 in)
- Position: Defender

Team information
- Current team: Ljungskile SK
- Number: 12

Youth career
- Horreds IF

Senior career*
Years	Team	Apps	(Gls)
2007–2008	Skene IF	22	(1)
2009–2011	Örgryte IS	32	(0)
2011	→ Kinna IF (loan)	11	(0)
2012	Kinna IF	13	(0)
2012–	Ljungskile SK	3	(0)
- * Club domestic league appearances and goals as of 9 July 2012

Adam Daniel Eriksson (born 2 February 1988) is a Swedish footballer who plays for Ljungskile SK as a defender.
