= Jimmy Dixon (footballer) =

Liberian footballer (born 1981)

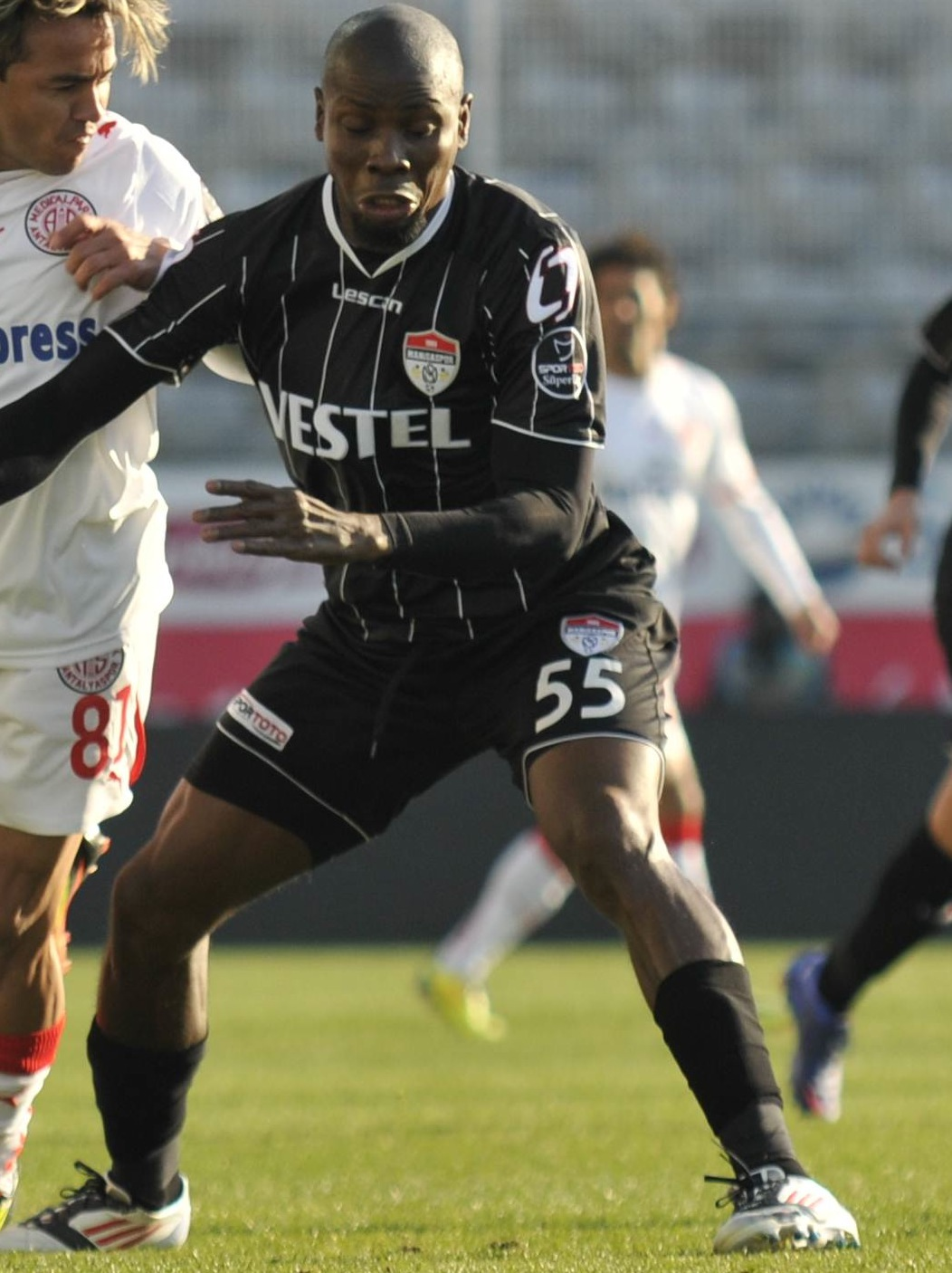
- Dixon with Manisaspor

Personal information
- Date of birth: 10 October 1981 (age 45)
- Place of birth: Tubmanburg, Liberia
- Height: 1.83 m (6 ft 0 in)
- Position: Defender

Senior career*
Years	Team	Apps	(Gls)
1998–1999	Mark Professionals		
2000–2001	Floda BoIF		
2002–2006	BK Häcken	116	(4)
2007–2009	Malmö FF	53	(1)
2009–2012	Manisaspor	65	(4)
2012–2013	BK Häcken	2	(0)
2013–2014	Boluspor	35	(0)
2015–2016	Assyriska BK	27	(3)

International career
1999–2012	Liberia	24	(0)

Managerial career
- 2016–: Assyriska BK (assistant coach)
- * Club domestic league appearances and goals

Jimmy Dixon (born 10 October 1981) is a Liberian football coach and former player who is assistant coach at Swedish club Assyriska BK. A defender, he spent most of his career in Sweden and Turkey. Between 1999 and 2012, he made 24 appearances for the Liberia national team.

== Club career ==
Born in Tubmanburg, Dixon began his career with Mark Professionals before moving to Swedish side Floda BoIF in 2000. After two seasons, Dixon moved to BK Häcken, spending five seasons at the club and attracting attention from English club Arsenal. Dixon signed for Malmö FF in time for the 2007 season, on a three-year contract. In 2009, Dixon moved to Turkey, to sign for Manisaspor.

He re-joined BK Häcken in 2012, before signing for Turkish club Boluspor in January 2013.

== International career ==
Dixon made his international debut for the Liberia national team in 1999, and appeared in ten FIFA World Cup qualifiers.
