= Jonas Sandqvist =

Swedish former professional footballer (born 1981)

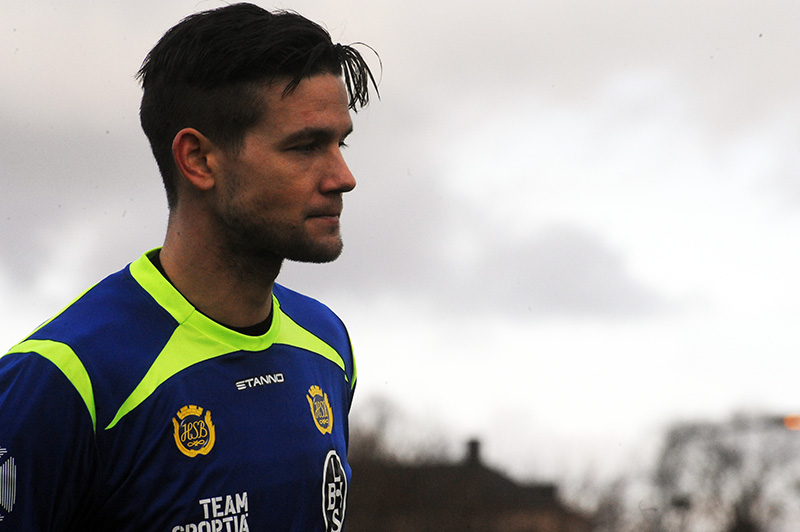

Personal information
- Full name: Jonas Fredrik Sandqvist
- Date of birth: May 6, 1981 (age 45)
- Place of birth: Eslöv, Sweden
- Height: 1.93 m (6 ft 4 in)
- Position: Goalkeeper

Youth career
- –1996: Borlunda AIF
- 1997: Lunds BK

Senior career*
Years	Team	Apps	(Gls)
1998–2005	Landskrona BoIS	63	(0)
2006–2009	Malmö FF	78	(0)
2009–2010	Atromitos	1	(0)
2011	Aalesunds FK	0	(0)
2012–2013	Örebro SK	16	(0)
2014	Keflavík	18	(0)
2015	Landskrona BoIS	25	(0)
2016	Asker Fotball	22	(0)
Total		223	(0)

International career^{‡}
2004	Sweden U21	1	(0)
2005	Sweden	1	(0)
- * Club domestic league appearances and goals as of 6 December 2016 ‡ National team caps and goals as of 29 December 2009

Jonas Fredrik Sandqvist (born 6 May 1981) is a Swedish former professional footballer who played as a goalkeeper. He played mainly for Landskrona BoIS and Malmö FF during a career that spanned between 1998 and 2016. He won one cap for the Sweden national team in 2005.

== Club career ==
Sandqvist began his career at Landskrona BoIS where he got a big breakthrough during the 2004 season in Allsvenskan. After the 2005 season, he left the club for the rivals Malmö FF and he rescued the team in many games, as the defence was leaking. After expressing his intent to leave the club as bosman, Malmö FF bought Johan Dahlin as new first goalkeeper and as Sandqvist failed to find a new club he sat on the bench for the rest of the 2009 season. On December 16, 2009 Atromitos F.C. agreed terms with Sandqvist for 2.5 years, starting on 1 January 2010. Sandqvist stayed on the bench for 2010, had no chances in Atromitos and on 7 December 2010 he was released from his contract. Sandqvist had a trial with Championship side Middlesbrough and was asked to stay longer but instead accepted a contract from Aalesunds FK. He had his first European level game for Aalesunds FK against Neath in the first qualifying round of the Europa League. Aalesunds FK won 4–1. On November 14, 2011, he signed a multiple year-contract with the Swedish club Örebro SK. He also played for Icelandic Keflavík before returning to Landskrona BoIS.

== International career ==
Sandqvist made his only Sweden U21 appearance on 2 June 2004 at the 2004 UEFA European Under-21 Championship in a 3–1 group stage game against Switzerland.

He made his full international debut for Sweden on 26 January 2005, keeping a clean sheet in a friendly game against Mexico as Sweden drew the Mexicans 0–0.
