= 2010 Malmö FF season =

Malmö FF
2010 season
- Chairman: Håkan Jeppsson
- Manager: Roland Nilsson
- Stadium: Swedbank Stadion
- Allsvenskan: 1st
- Svenska Cupen: Round 4
- Top goalscorer: League: Agon Mehmeti (11); All: Agon Mehmeti (14)
- Highest home attendance: 24,148 (7 November vs Mjällby AIF, Allsvenskan)
- Lowest home attendance: 9,346 (8 May vs Åtvidabergs FF, Allsvenskan)
- Average home league attendance: 15,194
Home colours	Away colours

The 2010 season was Malmö FF's 99th in existence, their 75th season in Allsvenskan and their 10th consecutive season in the league. They competed in Allsvenskan where they finished in 1st position and Svenska Cupen where they were knocked out in the fourth round. The club celebrated its 100th anniversary during the season, a pre-season training match against IF Elfsborg was played on the exact day, 24 February 2010. The club won Allsvenskan in the last round in the home game against Mjällby AIF on 7 November which Malmö FF won 2–0. The season was Roland Nilssons last full season as Malmö FF manager as he left the club during the 2011 season.

== Players ==
=== Squad ===
Note: Flags indicate national team as defined under FIFA eligibility rules; some limited exceptions apply. Players may hold more than one non-FIFA nationality.

No.	Pos.	Nation	Player
2	DF	DEN	Ulrich Vinzents
3	MF	SWE	Robert Åhman-Persson
4	DF	CMR	Joseph Elanga
5	MF	SRB	Miljan Mutavdzic
6	DF	FIN	Markus Halsti
7	FW	SWE	Daniel Larsson
8	DF	SWE	Daniel Andersson (Captain)
9	MF	BRA	Wilton Figueiredo
10	MF	NED	Rick Kruys
11	MF	SWE	Jeffrey Aubynn
14	MF	SWE	Guillermo Molins
15	DF	SWE	Pontus Jansson
16	DF	POR	Yago Fernández
17	MF	SWE	Ivo Pękalski

No.	Pos.	Nation	Player
18	FW	NGA	Edward Ofere
20	DF	BRA	Ricardinho
21	MF	SWE	Jimmy Durmaz
22	DF	SWE	Filip Stenström
24	FW	SWE	Agon Mehmeti
25	GK	CZE	Dusan Melichárek
26	MF	SWE	Jiloan Hamad
27	GK	SWE	Johan Dahlin
28	FW	SWE	Alexander Nilsson
29	DF	SWE	Jasmin Sudic
30	GK	SWE	Dejan Garača
36	MF	SWE	Muamet Asanovski
44	FW	SWE	Dardan Rexhepi

=== Players in/out ===
==== In ====
No.	Pos.	Nat.	Name	Age	EU	Moving from	Type	Transfer window	Ends	Transfer fee	Source
—	MF	(Sweden)	R.Nilsson	21	EU	Ängelholms FF	Loan return	Winter	Unknown	N/A	lokaltidningen.se
4	DF	(Cameroon)	Elanga	30	Non-EU	Brøndby (Denmark)	Free Transfer	Winter	2010	Free	mff.se
44	FW	(Sweden)	Rexhepi	18	EU	Youth system	Promoted	Summer	2014	N/A	mff.se
16	DF	(Portugal)	Yago	22	EU	Espanyol (Spain)	Free Transfer	Summer	2010	Free	mff.se

==== Out ====
No.	Pos.	Nat.	Name	Age	EU	Moving to	Type	Transfer window	Transfer fee	Source
5	DF	(Brazil)	Gabriel	26	Non-EU	Manisaspor (Turkey)	End of contract	Winter	Free	mff.se
1	GK	(Sweden)	Sandqvist	28	EU	Atromitos (Greece)	End of contract	Winter	Free	sydsvenskan.se
—	DF	(Sweden)	Milenković	21	EU	Free agent	Free Transfer	Winter	Free	mff.se
—	DF	(Sweden)	Mravac	20	EU	IF Limhamn Bunkeflo	Loan	Winter	N/A	mff.se
13	MF	(Sweden)	Stefanidis	28	EU	IF Brommapojkarna	Transfer	Winter	Unknown	mff.se
—	MF	(Sweden)	R.Nilsson	21	EU	Ängelholms FF	Loan	Winter	N/A	mff.se
19	MF	(Sweden)	Hansson	22	EU	IFK Klagshamn	Loan	Winter	N/A	mff.se
19	MF	(Sweden)	Hansson	22	EU		Retired	Winter	Free	mff.se
—	MF	(Sweden)	R.Nilsson	21	EU	Ängelholms FF	Transfer	Summer	Unknown	mff.se
3	MF	(Sweden)	Åhman-Persson	23	EU	AIK	Transfer	Summer	Unknown	mff.se
18	FW	(Nigeria)	Ofere	24	EU	Lecce (Italy)	Transfer	Summer	Unknown	mff.se

=== Squad stats ===
No.	Pos	Nat	Player	Total		Allsvenskan		Svenska Cupen		Other	
No.	Pos	Nat	Player	Apps	Goals	Apps	Goals	Apps	Goals	Apps	Goals
2	DF	(Denmark) DEN	Ulrich Vinzents	40	0	29	0	2	0	9	0
3	DF	(Sweden) SWE	Robert Åhman-Persson	16	3	9	3	0	0	7	0
4	DF	(Cameroon) CMR	Joseph Elanga	21	0	10	0	1	0	10	0
5	MF	(Serbia) SRB	Miljan Mutavdžić	17	0	12	0	0	0	5	0
6	DF	(Finland) FIN	Markus Halsti	14	2	7	1	1	0	6	1
7	FW	(Sweden) SWE	Daniel Larsson	38	10	29	10	1	0	8	0
8	DF	(Sweden) SWE	Daniel Andersson	41	5	30	5	2	0	9	0
9	MF	(Brazil) BRA	Wilton Figueiredo	37	7	27	5	2	0	8	2
10	MF	(Netherlands) NED	Rick Kruys	13	0	4	0	1	0	8	0
11	MF	(Sweden) SWE	Jeffrey Aubynn	29	1	20	1	1	0	8	0
14	MF	(Sweden) SWE	Guillermo Molins	36	9	28	7	2	1	6	1
15	FW	(Sweden) SWE	Pontus Jansson	23	2	18	1	2	0	3	1
16	DF	(Portugal) POR	Yago Fernández	11	3	10	3	0	0	1	0
17	MF	(Sweden) SWE	Ivo Pekalski	35	1	24	1	2	0	9	0
18	FW	(Nigeria) NGA	Edward Ofere	13	4	7	2	1	0	5	2
20	DF	(Brazil) BRA	Ricardinho	27	0	22	0	2	0	3	0
21	MF	(Sweden) SWE	Jimmy Durmaz	39	2	27	2	2	0	10	0
22	DF	(Sweden) SWE	Filip Stenström	5	0	0	0	0	0	5	0
24	FW	(Sweden) SWE	Agon Mehmeti	34	14	24	11	1	0	9	3
25	GK	(Czech Republic) CZE	Dusan Melichárek	2	0	0	0	1	0	1	0
26	MF	(Sweden) SWE	Jiloan Hamad	38	4	27	3	2	0	9	1
27	GK	(Sweden) SWE	Johan Dahlin	36	0	29	0	1	0	6	0
28	FW	(Sweden) SWE	Alexander Nilsson	7	2	3	2	0	0	4	0
29	DF	(Sweden) SWE	Jasmin Sudić	11	0	6	0	0	0	5	0
30	GK	(Sweden) SWE	Dejan Garača	9	0	2	0	0	0	7	0
36	MF	(Sweden) SWE	Muamet Asanovski	6	0	1	0	0	0	5	0
44	FW	(Sweden) SWE	Dardan Rexhepi	12	3	10	2	1	1	1	0

=== Disciplinary record ===
N	Pos.	Nat.	Name	Yellow card	Second yellow card	Red card	Notes
2	DF	(Denmark)	Vinzents	1			
4	DF	(Cameroon)	Elanga	1			
7	FW	(Sweden)	Larsson	3			
8	DF	(Sweden)	Andersson	2			
9	FW	(Brazil)	Figueiredo	8	1		
11	MF	(Sweden)	Aubynn	3			
14	MF	(Sweden)	Molins	3			
15	DF	(Sweden)	Jansson	1			
16	DF	(Portugal)	Yago	4			
17	MF	(Sweden)	Pekalski	6			
18	FW	(Nigeria)	Ofere	2		1	
20	DF	(Brazil)	Ricardinho	2	1		
21	MF	(Sweden)	Durmaz	3			
24	FW	(Sweden)	Mehmeti		1		
26	MF	(Sweden)	Hamad	2			
27	GK	(Sweden)	Dahlin	1			
29	DF	(Sweden)	Sudić	1			
44	FW	(Sweden)	Rexhepi	1			

Source: mff.se
Only competitive matches
(yellow card) = Number of bookings; (second yellow card) = Number of sending offs after a second yellow card; (red card) = Number of sending offs by a direct red card.
Notes: Allsvenskan only.

== Club ==
=== Coaching staff ===
Position	Staff
Head Coach First Team	(Sweden) Roland Nilsson
Assistant Coach First Team	(Spain) Josep Clotet Ruiz
First Team Coach / Head Coach U-21	(Sweden) Leif Engqvist
Head Coach Youth Academy	(Sweden) Mats Engqvist
Youth Talent Coach	(Sweden) Staffan Tapper
Goalkeeping Coach	(Sweden) Jonnie Fedel
Fitness Coach	(England) Simon Hollyhead
Physiotherapist	(Sweden) Wilner Registre

Source: Malmö FF

=== Other information ===
Chairman	(Sweden) Håkan Jeppsson
Managing director	(Sweden) Pelle Svensson
Ground (capacity and dimensions)	Swedbank Stadion (24,000 / 105x68 m)

Source: Malmö FF and Swedbank Stadion

== Competitions ==
=== Overall ===
Competition	Started round	Current position / round	Final position / round	First match	Last match
Allsvenskan	—	—	Winner	15 March	7 November
Svenska Cupen	Round 3	—	Round 4	18 May	4 July

Source: Competitions

=== Allsvenskan ===
==== League table ====
Pos	Team	Pld	W	D	L	GF	GA	GD	Pts	Qualification or relegation
1	Malmö FF (C)	30	21	4	5	59	24	+35	67	Qualification to Champions League second qualifying round
2	Helsingborgs IF	30	20	5	5	49	26	+23	65	Qualification to Europa League third qualifying round (Note: Helsingborg qualified for the Third qualifying round of the Europa League as Svenska Cupen champions 2010.)
3	Örebro SK	30	16	4	10	40	30	+10	52	Qualification to Europa League second qualifying round (Note: Örebro qualified for the Second qualifying round of the Europa League as they received Helsingborgs initial qualifying spot.)
4	IF Elfsborg	30	12	11	7	55	40	+15	47	Qualification to Europa League first qualifying round (Note: Elfsborg qualified for the Europa League as they received Örebro's initial qualifying spot.)
5	Trelleborgs FF	30	13	5	12	39	42	−3	44	

Source: svenskfotboll.se (in Swedish)
Rules for classification: 1) points; 2) goal difference; 3) number of goals scored.
(C) Champions

==== Results summary ====
Overall								Home						Away					
Pld	W	D	L	GF	GA	GD	Pts	W	D	L	GF	GA	GD	W	D	L	GF	GA	GD
30	21	4	5	59	24	+35	67	13	1	1	27	7	+20	8	3	4	32	17	+15

Source: svenskfotboll.se

==== Results by round ====
Round	1	2	3	4	5	6	7	8	9	10	11	12	13	14	15	16	17	18	19	20	21	22	23	24	25	26	27	28	29	30
Ground	A	H	A	H	A	H	A	H	A	H	A	H	A	H	A	H	H	A	H	A	H	A	H	A	H	A	H	A	A	H
Result	D	W	W	D	W	W	L	W	W	W	D	W	L	W	L	W	W	W	W	W	W	D	W	L	W	W	L	W	W	W
Position	10	4	3	3	2	2	2	2	2	2	2	2	2	2	2	2	2	2	2	2	1	1	1	1	1	1	1	1	1	1

Source: Matches
A = Away; H = Home; W = Win; D = Draw; L = Loss

==== Matches ====
Kickoff times are in CET.

15 March 2010 Round 1	GAIS	0–0	Malmö	Gothenburg
19.00		(Report)		Stadium: Gamla Ullevi; Attendance: 4,980; Referee: Martin Hansson

23 March 2010 Round 2	Malmö	3–0	Örebro	Malmö
19.00	Mehmeti 21', 27'; Molins 69'	(Report)		Stadium: Swedbank Stadion; Attendance: 13,783; Referee: Michael Lerjéus

28 March 2010 Round 3	Gefle	1–3	Malmö	Gävle
13.30	Gerndt 78'	(Report)	Åhman-Persson 11', 58'; Daniel Andersson 62'	Stadium: Strömvallen; Attendance: 2,702; Referee: Jonas Eriksson

6 April 2010 Round 4	Malmö	1–1	Halmstad	Malmö
19.00	Åhman-Persson 71'	(Report)	Görlitz 49'	Stadium: Swedbank Stadion; Attendance: 11,671; Referee: Martin Hansson

11 April 2010 Round 5	Kalmar	2–3	Malmö	Kalmar
15.00	Dauda 12'; Eriksson 16'	(Report)	Ofere 15'; Figueiredo 53'; Halsti 58'	Stadium: Fredriksskans; Attendance: 4,577; Referee: Markus Strömbergsson

14 April 2010 Round 6	Malmö	3–1	Häcken	Malmö
19.00	Ofere 7'; Daniel Andersson 56' (pen.); Molins 57'	(Report)	Paulinho 25'	Stadium: Swedbank Stadion; Attendance: 11,127; Referee: Jonas Eriksson

20 April 2010 Round 7	Helsingborg	2–1	Malmö	Helsingborg
19.00	Gashi 9'; Nilsson 21'	(Report)	Figueiredo 4' (pen.)	Stadium: Olympia; Attendance: 16,200; Referee: Markus Strömbergsson

26 April 2010 Round 8	Malmö	2–1	Djurgården	Malmö
19.00	Larsson 11', 63'	(Report)	Hämäläinen 86'	Stadium: Swedbank Stadion; Attendance: 13,028; Referee: Michael Lerjéus

29 April 2010 Round 9	Göteborg	0–2	Malmö	Gothenburg
19.00		(Report)	Larsson 21'; Molins 69'	Stadium: Gamla Ullevi; Attendance: 11,206; Referee: Stefan Johannesson

2 May 2010 Round 10	Malmö	2–0	Trelleborg	Malmö
17.00	Durmaz 25'; Molins 87'	(Report)		Stadium: Swedbank Stadion; Attendance: 16,814; Referee: Jonas Eriksson

5 May 2010 Round 11	Elfsborg	2–2	Malmö	Borås
19.00	Avdić 36', 86' (pen.)	(Report)	Durmaz 26'; Figueiredo 35'	Stadium: Borås Arena; Attendance: 10,186; Referee: Markus Strömbergsson

8 May 2010 Round 12	Malmö	3–1	Åtvidaberg	Malmö
16.00	Mehmeti 19'; Molins 25'; Figueiredo 78'	(Report)	Prince Eboagwu 22'	Stadium: Swedbank Stadion; Attendance: 9,346; Referee: Martin Ingvarsson

15 May 2010 Round 14	Mjällby	4–2	Malmö	Hällevik
16.00	El Kabir 11', 22'; Löfquist 44'; Nicklasson 90'	(Report)	Larsson 51'; Jansson 57'	Stadium: Strandvallen; Attendance: 7,125; Referee: Stefan Johannesson

24 May 2010 Round 13	Malmö	2–1	Brommapojkarna	Malmö
20.00	Nilsson 6', 64'	(Report)	Guidetti 90'	Stadium: Swedbank Stadion; Attendance: 9,565; Referee: Sven-Martin Åkesson

17 July 2010 Round 15	AIK	2–0	Malmö	Solna
16.00	Pavey 2' (pen.); Flávio 40'	(Report)		Stadium: Råsunda; Attendance: 10,347; Referee: Jonas Eriksson

24 July 2010 Round 16	Malmö	1–0	AIK	Malmö
16.00	Mehmeti 41'	(Report)		Stadium: Swedbank Stadion; Attendance: 14,149; Referee: Michael Lerjéus

1 August 2010 Round 17	Malmö	1–0	GAIS	Malmö
16.30	Pekalski 22'	(Report)		Stadium: Swedbank Stadion; Attendance: 12,212; Referee: Tobias Mattsson

7 August 2010 Round 18	Örebro	0–3	Malmö	Örebro
16.00		(Report)	Hamad 14'; Mehmeti 16'; Larsson 72' (pen.)	Stadium: Behrn Arena; Attendance: 10,880; Referee: Martin Ingvarsson

15 August 2010 Round 19	Malmö	2–0	Gefle	Malmö
16.00	Larsson 30'; Mehmeti 54'	(Report)		Stadium: Swedbank Stadion; Attendance: 14,520; Referee: Sven-Martin Åkesson

23 August 2010 Round 20	Halmstad	0–2	Malmö	Halmstad
19.00		(Report)	Mehmeti 42', 66'	Stadium: Örjans Vall; Attendance: 5,502; Referee: Markus Strömbergsson

29 August 2010 Round 21	Malmö	1–0	Elfsborg	Malmö
18.00	Andersson 79'	(Report)		Stadium: Swedbank Stadion; Attendance: 16,415; Referee: Jonas Eriksson

11 September 2010 Round 22	Åtvidaberg	3–3	Malmö	Åtvidaberg
16.00	Arvidsson 44' (pen.); Roiha 45'; Möller 65'	(Report)	Mehmeti 13'; Larsson 35'; Yago 89'	Stadium: Kopparvallen; Attendance: 7,130; Referee: Tobias Mattsson

15 September 2010 Round 23	Malmö	2–0	Helsingborg	Malmö
20.00	Rexhepi 17'; Figueiredo 90'	(Report)		Stadium: Swedbank Stadion; Attendance: 23,743; Referee: Jonas Eriksson

20 September 2010 Round 24	Djurgården	1–0	Malmö	Stockholm
19.00	Igboananike 24'	(Report)		Stadium: Stockholm Stadion; Attendance: 7,699; Referee: Michael Lerjéus

26 September 2010 Round 25	Malmö	2–1	Göteborg	Malmö
16.30	Andersson 38'; Larsson 64'	(Report)	Hysén 81'	Stadium: Swedbank Stadion; Attendance: 18,125; Referee: Stefan Johannesson

3 October 2010 Round 26	Trelleborg	0–3	Malmö	Trelleborg
18.00		(Report)	Hamad 27'; Larsson 80' (pen.); Molins 90'	Stadium: Vångavallen; Attendance: 9,049; Referee: Martin Hansson

18 October 2010 Round 27	Malmö	0–1	Kalmar	Malmö
19.00		(Report)	Mendes 86'	Stadium: Swedbank Stadion; Attendance: 19,258; Referee: Markus Strömbergsson

27 October 2010 Round 28	Häcken	0–4	Malmö	Gothenburg
19.00		(Report)	Larsson 15'; Molins 25'; Yago 71', 81'	Stadium: Rambergsvallen; Attendance: 3,147; Referee: Stefan Johannesson

1 November 2010 Round 29	Brommapojkarna	0–4	Malmö	Stockholm
19.00		(Report)	Aubynn 59'; Mehmeti 79'; Rexhepi 83'; Andersson 90' (pen.)	Stadium: Grimsta IP; Attendance: 4,245; Referee: Martin Ingvarsson

7 November 2010 Round 30	Malmö	2–0	Mjällby	Malmö
16.30	Hamad 17'; Mehmeti 45'	(Report)		Stadium: Swedbank Stadion; Attendance: 24,148; Referee: Jonas Eriksson

=== Svenska Cupen ===
Kickoff times are in CET.

18 May 2010 Round 3	Syrianska	0–1 (a.e.t.)	Malmö	Södertälje
19:00		(Report)	Rexhepi 119'	Stadium: Södertälje Fotbollsarena; Attendance: 1,290; Referee: Martin Strömbergsson

4 July 2010 Round 4	Mjällby	4–1	Malmö	Malmö
16:00	El Kabir 24', 48', 54', 81'	(Report)	Molins 63'	Stadium: Swedbank Stadion; Attendance: 2,393; Referee: Magnus Ahlsén

== Non competitive ==
=== Pre-season ===
23 January 2010 Friendly	Malmö FF (Sweden)	5–1	(Denmark) Køge BK	Malmö, Sweden
13:00	Ofere 7'; Halsti 23'; Ofere 38'; Methmeti 62'; Hamad 87'	Report	Toft 17'	Stadium: Malmö IP

1 February 2010 Friendly	FC Nordsjælland (Denmark)	6–0	(Sweden) Malmö FF	Farum, Denmark
13:00	Fetai 9'; Fetai 10'; N. Nielsen 53'; Nielsen 62'; Pereira 70' (pen.); M. Nielsen 84'	Report		Stadium: Farum Park

9 February 2010 Friendly	Malmö FF (Sweden)	1–1	(Sweden) GAIS	Malmö, Sweden
19:00	Mehmeti 84'	Report	B. Andersson 76'	Stadium: Malmö IP; Attendance: 1,115

17 February 2010 Friendly	Malmö FF (Sweden)	0–0	(Ukraine) Metalurh Donetsk	Málaga, Spain
16:00		Report		Stadium: Sol Andalusi

20 February 2010 Friendly	Malmö FF (Sweden)	0–2	(Russia) Lokomotiv Moscow	Málaga, Spain
16:00		Report		Stadium: MPFS Marpafut

24 February 2010 Friendly	Malmö FF (Sweden)	1–3	(Sweden) IF Elfsborg	Malmö, Sweden
15:00	Mehmeti 43'	Report	Keene 9'; Keene 50'; Keene 80'	Stadium: Malmö IP; Attendance: - Referee: Martin Ohlsson

28 February 2010 Friendly	Brøndby IF (Denmark)	2–3	(Sweden) Malmö FF	Brøndby, Denmark
13:00	Krohn-Dehli 31'; Fanerud 70'	Report	Figueiredo 12'; Figueiredo 25'; Molins 44'	Stadium: Brøndby Stadion

=== Mid-season ===
19 June 2010 Friendly	IF Elfsborg (Sweden)	2–1	(Sweden) Malmö FF	Borås, Sweden
14:00	Ericsson 25' (str); Hult 78'	Report	Hernane 21'	Stadium: Borås Arena; Referee: Magnus Ahlsén

24 June 2010 Friendly	Malmö FF (Sweden)	2–1	(Denmark) Brøndby IF	Malmö, Sweden
16:00	Jansson 66'; Figueiredo 71'	Report		Stadium: Swedbank Stadion; Attendance: 986; Referee: Daniel Stålhammar

27 July 2010 Friendly	Malmö FF (Sweden)	0–0	(England) Fulham	Malmö, Sweden
19:00		Report 1 Report 2		Stadium: Swedbank Stadion; Attendance: 5,019
