= Ivo Pękalski =

Swedish footballer

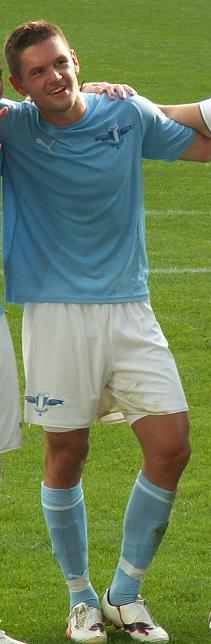
- Pękalski playing for Malmö FF in 2010

Personal information
- Full name: Ivo Dominik Pękalski
- Date of birth: 3 November 1990 (age 36)
- Place of birth: Lund, Sweden
- Height: 1.83 m (6 ft 0 in)
- Position: Midfielder

Team information
- Current team: Utsikten
- Number: 23

Youth career
- –2001: Linero IF
- 2001–2005: Lunds BK
- 2005–2007: Landskrona BoIS

Senior career*
| Years | Team | Apps | (Gls) |
| 2007–2009 | Landskrona BoIS | 56 | (3) |
| 2009–2014 | Malmö FF | 65 | (4) |
| 2014–2016 | Häcken | 30 | (0) |
| 2016–2017 | Halmstads BK | 31 | (0) |
| 2017–2019 | Oxford United | 0 | (0) |
| 2018 | → Halmstads BK (loan) | 14 | (0) |
| 2019–2022 | Norrby | 93 | (0) |
| 2023– | Utsikten | 40 | (1) |

International career
| 2005–2007 | Sweden U17 | 15 | (2) |
| 2008–2009 | Sweden U19 | 7 | (0) |
| 2010–2011 | Sweden U21 | 6 | (0) |
| 2013 | Sweden | 2 | (0) |
- * Club domestic league appearances and goals as of 14 November 2024

Ivo Dominik Pękalski (Polish pronunciation: [pɛŋˈkalskʲi] born 3 November 1990) is a Swedish professional footballer who plays as a midfielder for Utsiktens BK. Beginning his career with Landskrona BoIS in 2007, he went on to represent Malmö FF, BK Häcken, Halmstads BK, and Oxford United before signing with Norrby IF in 2019. Having represented the Sweden U17, U19, and U21 teams between 2005 and 2011, he made his full international debut for Sweden in 2013.

== Club career ==
=== Early career ===
Born and raised in Lund, Pękalski began his career with Linero IF and has also played for Lunds BK. After few years with the club, he was bought by Landskrona BoIS in December 2005. While progressing through his career at Landskrona BoIS, Pękalski was linked with a move to Premier League side Liverpool and was offered to join the club. However, he rejected a move to Liverpool, preferring to stay at Landskrona BoIS.

Soon after, Pękalski was promoted to Landskrona BoIS’ first team ahead of the 2007 season. Shortly after, he then signed a three–year contract with the club. Pękalski made his debut for Landskrona BoIS on 23 April 2007 against IF Sylvia, starting a match and played 75 minutes before being substituted, in a 0–0 draw. In follow–up match, he scored his first goal for the club, in a 2–1 win against Gefle. His second goal for Landskrona BoIS came on 8 July 2007, in a 4–2 win against Åtvidaberg. Following this, Pękalski quickly established himself in the first team for the club, playing in the midfield position. At the end of the 2007 season, he went on to make twenty–nine appearances and scoring times in all competitions.

The first two months to the 2008 season saw Pękalski continue to feature in and out of the starting line–up for Landskrona BoIS. It wasn't until on 25 August 2008 when he scored his first goal of the season, in a 3–1 win against Jönköpings Södra. However, Pękalski suffered an injury that saw him sidelined for the rest of the 2008 season.

Pękalski started in the first three matches of the 2009 season, including scoring his first goal of the season against IK Sirius on 19 April 2009 before missing one match due to suspension. After returning, he continued to feature in a number of matches in the first team despite facing sidelined along the way. By the time Pękalski left the club, he made sixteen appearances and scoring once in all competitions.

=== Malmö FF ===
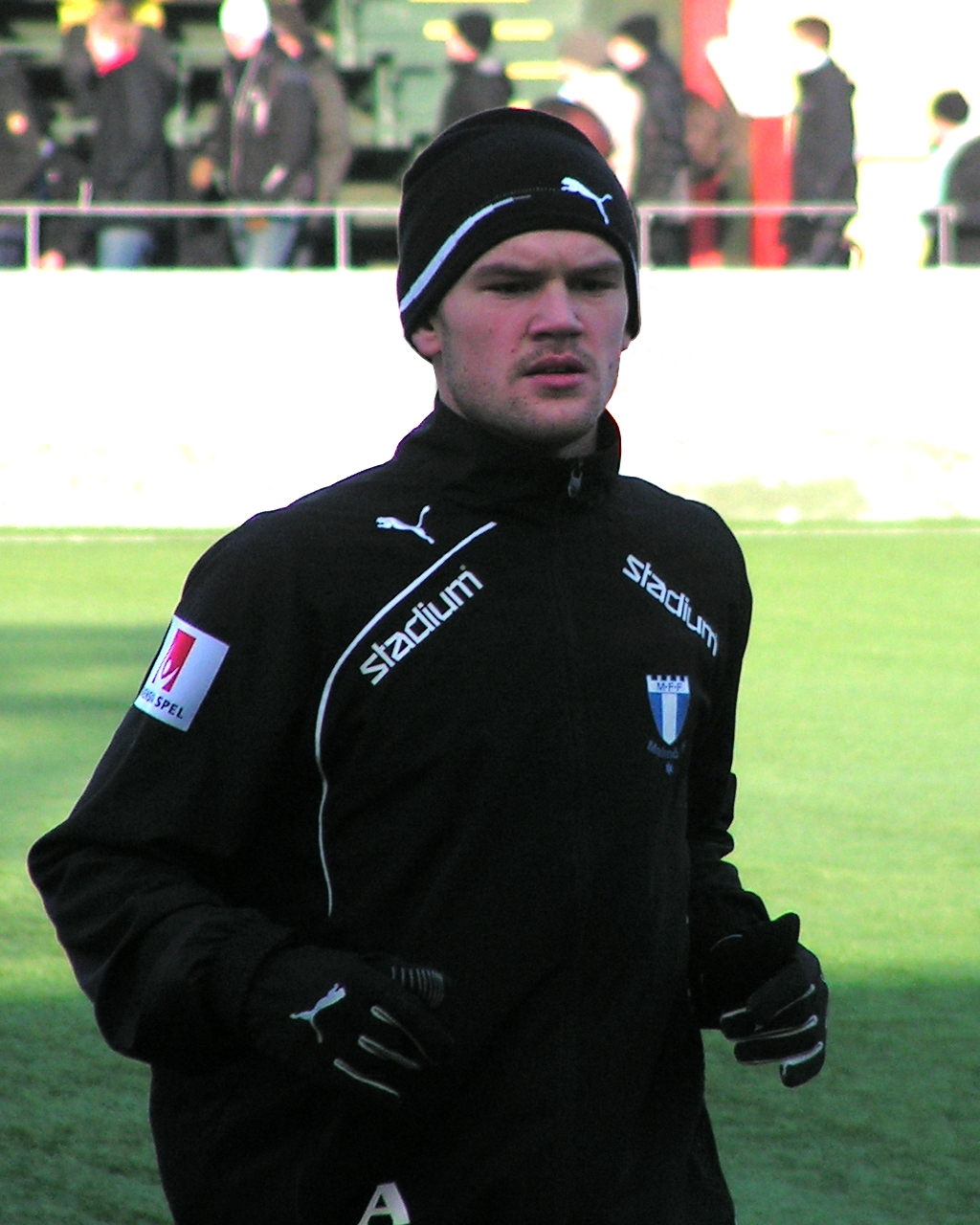
Pękalski training for Malmö FF in January 2010.

On 27 July 2009, Pękalski was transferred from Landskrona BoIS to Malmö FF, signing a four–year contract, keeping him until 2013. However, he was assigned to playing for the reserve team during his first year at the club. At one point, Pękalski appeared in the club's first team, appearing as an unused substitute against IFK Göteborg on 19 October 2009.

Ahead of the 2010 season, Pękalski was promoted to the Malmö FF's first team. It wasn't until on 19 March 2010 when he made his debut for the club, coming on as a 71st-minute substitute, in a 3–0 win against Örebro. Since making his debut for Malmö FF, Pękalski then clinched a permanent spot in the starting eleven for the club in the 2010 season and formed a very strong central midfield with Wílton Figueiredo. He then scored his first goal for Malmö FF, which the only goal of the game, in a 1–0 win against GAIS on 1 August 2010. His performance attracted interests from Serie A side Bologna. However, Pękalski missed a match against Mjällby AIF on 7 November 2010, which saw the club win 2–0, a result that saw Malmö FF win the league for the first time in six years. Despite missing three more matches later in the 2010 season, he went on to make twenty–six appearances and scoring two times in all competitions. For his performance, Pękalski was named Swedish Newcomer of the Year.

The start of the 2011 season saw Pękalski sidelined with a thigh injury, which he sustained two months prior. It wasn't until on 2 May 2011 when Pękalski made his first appearance of the season, starting a match and played 85 minutes before being substituted, in a 2–0 loss against IFK Göteborg. He made three more starts for Malmö FF, including scoring his first goal of the season, in a 1–1 draw against BK Häcken on 20 May 2011. However, during a match against BK Häcken, Pękalski suffered a finger injury that saw him substituted in the 55th minute and was sidelined for a month. It wasn't until on 23 June 2011 when he made his return from injury, coming on as a 70th-minute substitute, in a 0–0 draw against Gefle. In a match against GAIS on 20 August 2011, Pękalski scored his second goal of the season, but was sent–off in the 55th minute for a second bookable offence, in a 2–1 win. He then played all six matches Malmö FF of the UEFA Champions League qualifying round matches by beating the likes of against Havnar Bóltfelag and Rangers. However, Pękalski was unable to help the club failed to advance to the UEFA Champions League after losing 4–3 on aggregate against Dinamo Zagreb. Despite suffering sidelined once more later in the 2011 season, he continued to be involved in the first team in a number of matches. His performance continued to attract interests from European clubs, such as, Milan, Ajax and Newcastle United. At the end of the 2011 season, Pękalski went on to make thirty–two appearances and scoring two times in all competitions.

Ahead of the 2012 season, Pękalski said: "The first is of course that I can be injury-free and have the opportunity to train on exactly everything I need. Then I want to explode and make my best season so far. I have lost time because I could not train. I'm still young, but the years are coming. It's ticking. I know that my development would have continued after the golden year if I had been whole." However, he suffered an injury that saw him miss the opening game of the season against Gefle. But Pękalski made his first appearance of the season, coming on as a 68th-minute substitute, in a 5–0 loss against BK Häcken on 7 April 2012. Following this, he appeared in the next seven matches for the club, including scoring his first goal of the season, in a 3–0 win against Helsingborg on 10 May 2012. However, Pękalski missed one match, due to a hip problem and made his return to the starting line–up against IF Elfsborg on 17 May 2012, as he helped Malmö FF win 1–0. Pękalski then started in the next four matches for the club before suffering an injury that kept him out for weeks. It wasn't until on 12 August 2012 when he returned to the first team from injury, coming on as a 75th-minute substitute, in a 1–0 win against Elfsborg. However, his return was short–lived when Pękalski suffered another injury that kept him out for weeks. But he made his return from the first team from injury, coming on as a 73rd-minute substitute, in a 2–1 loss against IFK Göteborg. Following this, Pękalski found his playing time, mostly coming from the substitute bench. Throughout the 2012 season, he continued to struggle with his injury problems during the 2012 season but nevertheless played 21 matches and scored one goal for Malmö FF. Following this, Pękalski was in a discussion over a new contract with the club.

At the start of the 2013 season, Pękalski made his first appearance of the season, coming on as a 74th-minute substitute, in a 1–1 draw against Öster in the Svenska Cupen match. It wasn't until on 16 March 2013 when he scored his first goal of the season, in a 4–1 win against GIF Sundsvall in the Svenska Cupen match. However, Pękalski was dropped from the first team, due to competitions in the midfield position and his own injury concern. Having played only one league match due to injuries as well as being discontented with the club's rehab procedures, Pękalski left the club after the 2013 season.

=== BK Häcken ===
It was announced on 25 November 2013 that Pękalski joined BK Häcken on a free transfer, signing a two–year contract.

He made his debut for the club, starting a match and played 60 minutes before being substituted, in a 2–0 win against Örgryte on 1 March 2014 in the Svenska Cupen. Seven days later on 8 March 2014, Pękalski scored his first goal for BK Häcken, in a 4–1 win against Sandviken in the Svenska Cupen. He then set up two goals in two matches between 20 April 2014 and 27 April 2014 against Mjällby AIF and AIK. However, Pękalski found himself placed on the substitute bench and his playing time came from the club's reserve side throughout the 2014 season. At the end of the 2014 season, he went on to make sixteen appearances and scoring once in all competitions.

At the start of the 2015 season, Pękalski established himself in the first team, playing in the midfield position. However, his form soon dipped that saw him placed on the substitute bench, as well as, his own injury concern. At the end of the 2015 season, he went on to make eighteen appearances in all competitions. Following this, it was announced on 4 November 2015 that Pękalski left the club when his contract expired at the end of the 2015 season. While being a free agent, he volunteered in a refugee camp in Lebanon.

=== Halmstads BK ===
It was announced on 23 March 2016 that Pękalski signed for Halmstads BK on a two–year contract. However, he continued to be sidelined for the next three months, due to his continuous injury concern that he sustained last season.

It wasn't until on 18 June 2016 when Pękalski made his debut for the club, starting the match and played 69 minutes before being substituted, in a 5–2 loss against IK Frej. Since joining Halmstads BK, he quickly established himself in the first team, playing in the midfield position. Pękalski played in both legs for the league's play–offs against Helsingborgs, as Halmstads won 3–2 on aggregate to send the club promoted to the Allsvenskan next season. Despite missing two matches later in the 2016 season through suspension, he went on to make sixteen appearances in all competitions.

At the start of the 2017 season, Pękalski continued to establish himself in the first team, playing in the midfield position. He then captained the side for the first time, coming against IFK Norrköping on 4 March 2017, as the club lost 7–0 in the Svenska Cupen. Pękalski captained three more times for Halmstads BK in the next four months. Despite missing two matches due to suspension up until his departure, he went on to make eighteen appearances in all competitions. Prior to his departure from the club, Halmstads BK have been discussing with the player over a new contract.

=== Oxford United ===
On 8 August 2017, it was confirmed that Pękalski had left Halmstad to sign for EFL League One side Oxford United on a two-year deal for an undisclosed fee. Upon joining the club, he was joined by Manager Pep Clotet, who was his coach during their time at Malmö FF and teammate, Agon Mehmeti. Just four days later, Pękalski suffered a cruciate ligament injury during training which ruled him out until the New Year.

By February, he made his return to training and was featured in Oxford United's friendly matches. Despite his return from injury, Pękalski never played for the club for the entirety of the 2017–18 season. Following this, he was told by the club that he can leave Oxford United after being deemed surplus to requirements.

==== Loan to Halmstad ====
On 18 July 2018, Pękalski re-joined Halmstads on loan until November 2018.

He made his second debut for the club, coming on as a 64-minute substitute, against Degerfors on 31 July 2018 and set up a goal for Kosuke Kinoshita, who scored the winning goal, in a 2–1 win. Since joining Halmstads for the second time, Pękalski has been involved in a number of matches for the side. Despite missing one match, he went on to make fourteen appearances in all competitions. Following this, Pękalski returned to his parent club.

==== Return from loan and departure ====
After his loan spell at Halmstads came to an end, Pękalski was given an ultimatum by the club – find a club in Sweden by next week or face the consequences. He left Oxford by mutual consent on 28 February 2019 without making a single first-team appearance.

=== Norrby IF ===
Having been a free agent for five months, Pękalski joined Norrby IF on 3 July 2019.

He made his debut for the club, coming on as a 64th-minute substitute, in a 1–0 loss against Halmstads on 14 July 2019. Since joining Norrby IF, Pękalski quickly been involved in a number of matches in the first team. Despite being on a sidelined on two occasions, he went on to make fourteen appearances in all competitions. For his performance, Pękalski signed a contract extension with the club, keeping him until 2021.

Despite the 2020 season was pushed back to three months due to the pandemic, Pękalski was given the club's captaincy. He captained his first match for the side, coming against GAIS on 21 June 2020, as Norrby IF won 3–0. Pękalski continued to establish himself in the starting eleven for Norrby IF, playing in the midfield position. Despite missing two matches later in the 2020 season, he went on to make twenty–nine appearances in all competitions.

== International career ==
Pękalski is eligible to play for Poland or Sweden. At one point, Poland tried to convince him to play for the national team and even tried to call him up in August, but he refused to respond to questions about his choice of nationality by the Swedish media. In December 2011, Pękalski ended up making a decision by choosing to represent Sweden.

=== Youth career ===
In August 2005, Pękalski was called up to the Sweden U15 squad for the first time and he went on to make three appearances for the U15 side. In February 2006, Pękalski was called up to the Sweden U16 squad for the first time and he went on to make two appearances for the U16 side. In August 2006, Pękalski was called up to the Sweden U17 for the first time and went on to make six appearances for the U17 side.

In February 2008, Pękalski was called up to the Sweden U18 squad for the first time and he went on to make two appearances for the U18 side. In February 2009, Pękalski was called up to the Sweden U19 squad for the first time and he went on to make five appearances for the U19 side. On two occasions, Pękalski was called up to the Sweden U21. It wasn't until on 11 August 2010 when he made his U21 debut, starting a match and played 68 minutes before being substituted, in a 1–1 draw against Scotland U21. Pękalski went on to make five appearances for Sweden U21.

=== Senior career ===
Pękalski was selected for the annual training camp for the Sweden national team in January 2011, but withdrew due to minor injury problems.

He was also selected for the same camp in 2012, but also this time he missed out due to injury problems. The squad selection for the camp traditionally feature the best Swedish players in domestic and other Scandinavian leagues. Pękalski was selected for the third time in 2013 and was finally able to accept the invitation after an injury-ridden season. He made his début for the national team in the 2013 King's Cup on 23 January 2013 against North Korea when he was subbed on in the second half. Pękalski played from the start in the following fixture against Finland on 26 January in the same tournament.

== Personal life ==
Pękalski's parents are from Rzeszów, Poland. His father, Roman Pękalski, coached him until he was 14. He has a brother, Phillip, 12 years younger. Because of his parents’ nationality, Pękalski has a Polish passport, making him a dual citizen for Poland and Sweden.

During his time at Malmö FF, Pękalski earned a nickname called "King Ivo", due to his always calm and controlled – preferably also reasonably angry. In February 2017, he spoke about mental health, dealing with his struggles as a footballer.

== Career statistics ==
=== Club ===
As of match played 10 November 2018

Appearances and goals by club, season and competition
| Club | Season | League | | | Cup | | Other | | Total | |
| Club | Season | Division | Apps | Goals | Apps | Goals | Apps | Goals | Apps | Goals |
|---|---|---|---|---|---|---|---|---|---|---|
| Landskrona BoIS | 2007 | Superettan | 26 | 2 | 3 | 0 | — | | 29 | 2 |
| Landskrona BoIS | 2008 | Superettan | 18 | 0 | 3 | 0 | — | | 21 | 0 |
| Landskrona BoIS | 2009 | Superettan | 12 | 1 | 4 | 0 | — | | 16 | 1 |
| Landskrona BoIS | Total | | 56 | 3 | 10 | 0 | 0 | 0 | 66 | 3 |
| Malmö FF | 2009 | Allsvenskan | 0 | 0 | 0 | 0 | — | | 0 | 0 |
| Malmö FF | 2010 | Allsvenskan | 24 | 1 | 2 | 0 | — | | 26 | 1 |
| Malmö FF | 2011 | Allsvenskan | 19 | 2 | 0 | 0 | 10 (Note: Six appearances in the Champions League and four in the Europa League) | 0 | 29 | 2 |
| Malmö FF | 2012 | Allsvenskan | 21 | 1 | 0 | 0 | — | | 21 | 1 |
| Malmö FF | 2013 | Allsvenskan | 1 | 0 | 3 | 1 | 0 | 0 | 4 | 1 |
| Malmö FF | Total | | 65 | 4 | 5 | 1 | 10 | 0 | 80 | 5 |
| BK Häcken | 2014 | Allsvenskan | 13 | 0 | 3 | 0 | — | | 16 | 0 |
| BK Häcken | 2015 | Allsvenskan | 17 | 0 | 1 | 0 | — | | 18 | 0 |
| BK Häcken | Total | | 30 | 0 | 4 | 0 | 0 | 0 | 34 | 0 |
| Halmstads BK | 2016 | Superettan | 16 | 0 | 0 | 0 | — | | 16 | 0 |
| Halmstads BK | 2017 | Allsvenskan | 15 | 0 | 3 | 0 | — | | 18 | 0 |
| Halmstads BK | Total | | 31 | 0 | 3 | 0 | 0 | 0 | 34 | 0 |
| Oxford United | 2017–18 | League One | 0 | 0 | 0 | 0 | — | | 0 | 0 |
| Halmstads BK (loan) | 2018 | Superettan | 14 | 0 | 1 | 0 | — | | 15 | 0 |
| Career total | | | 196 | 7 | 23 | 1 | 10 | 0 | 229 | 8 |

=== International ===
Appearances and goals by national team and year
| National team | Year | Apps | Goals |
|---|---|---|---|
| Sweden | 2013 | 2 | 0 |
| Total | | 2 | 0 |

== Honours ==
Malmö FF

- Allsvenskan: 2010, 2013

BK Häcken

- Svenska Cupen: 2015–16

Individual

- Swedish Newcomer of the Year: 2010
- LISA (stands for Landskrona Idrottsföreningars Samorganisations): 2008
