= Miljan Mutavdžić =

Serbian footballer

Personal information
- Date of birth: 3 February 1986 (age 40)
- Place of birth: Novi Pazar, SFR Yugoslavia
- Height: 1.91 m (6 ft 3 in)
- Position: Midfielder

Senior career*
Years	Team	Apps	(Gls)
2003–2004	Bane	44	(10)
2005–2008	Javor Ivanjica	79	(15)
2005	→ Metalac GM (loan)	11	(2)
2009–2011	Malmö FF	35	(2)
2012	Radnički Kragujevac	20	(1)
2013–2014	Novi Pazar	35	(8)
2014–2015	Borac Čačak	26	(4)
2016	Radnik Surdulica	9	(1)
2016–2017	Novi Pazar	14	(0)
2017–2020	FK Bane		

International career
2008	Serbia U21	1	(0)
2008–2009	Serbia	2	(0)
- * Club domestic league appearances and goals as of 31 May 2017

Miljan Mutavdžić (Serbian Cyrillic: Миљан Мутавџић; born 3 February 1986) is a Serbian professional footballer who plays as a central or defensive midfielder.

Between 2008 and 2009, Mutavdžić earned two international caps for the Serbia national team, both friendlies.

== Club career ==
=== Early years ===
Mutavdžić made his senior debut while playing for Bane in the Second League of Serbia and Montenegro. He then moved to Javor Ivanjica in the winter of 2005, spending there the following four years, until the winter of 2009. Mutavdžić was a member of the team that won the 2007–08 Serbian First League with an unbeaten record. He also went on a six-month loan to Metalac Gornji Milanovac in the first half of the 2005–06 season.

=== Malmö FF ===
In March 2009, Mutavdžić was officially transferred to Malmö FF. He scored on his league debut for the club in a 1–0 away victory over BK Häcken. However, Mutavdžić suffered a knee injury less than a week later, causing him to miss the rest of the 2009 season. He faced some problems while recovering from his injury, but managed to play 12 league games in the 2010 season, helping the club win its first Allsvenskan title since 2004. Fully recovered, Mutavdžić played regularly during the 2011 season, making 22 league appearances and scoring once. He also made nine appearances in European competitions that year, when the club was eliminated in the play-off round of the Champions League, before reaching the group stage of the Europa League.

=== Return to Serbia ===
In the 2012 winter transfer window, Mutavdžić returned to Serbia after three years by joining Radnički Kragujevac. He moved to his hometown club Novi Pazar in January 2013. On 16 July 2014, Mutavdžić signed a two-year contract with newly promoted SuperLiga club Borac Čačak.

== International career ==
On 14 December 2008, Mutavdžić made his international debut for Serbia in a friendly match against Poland in Antalya. His second appearance for the national team came in another friendly match, on 11 February 2009, against Ukraine in Nicosia.

== Statistics ==
As of 31 May 2017

=== Club ===
Club	Season	League		Cup		Continental		Super Cup		Total	
Club	Season	Apps	Goals	Apps	Goals	Apps	Goals	Apps	Goals	Apps	Goals
Bane	2002–03	4	0	0	0	0	0	–		4	0
Bane	2003–04	25	6	0	0	0	0	–		25	6
Bane	2004–05	15	4	0	0	0	0	–		15	4
Bane	Total	44	10	0	0	0	0	–		44	10
Javor Ivanjica	2004–05	3	0	0	0	0	0	–		3	0
Metalac Gornji Milanovac	2005–06	11	2	0	0	0	0	–		11	2
Javor Ivanjica	2005–06	8	1	0	0	0	0	–		8	1
Javor Ivanjica	2006–07	23	4	-	-	0	0	–		23	4
Javor Ivanjica	2007–08	29	5	-	-	0	0	–		29	5
Javor Ivanjica	2008–09	16	5	-	-	0	0	–		16	5
Javor Ivanjica	Total	79	15	-	-	0	0	–		79	15
Malmö FF	2009	1	1	0	0	0	0	0	0	1	1
Malmö FF	2010	12	0	0	0	0	0	0	0	12	0
Malmö FF	2011	22	1	3	1	9	0	1	0	35	2
Malmö FF	Total	35	2	3	1	9	0	1	0	48	3
Radnički Kragujevac	2011–12	9	1	0	0	0	0	–		9	1
Radnički Kragujevac	2012–13	11	0	0	0	0	0	–		11	0
Radnički Kragujevac	Total	20	1	0	0	0	0	–		20	1
Novi Pazar	2012–13	12	3	0	0	0	0	–		12	3
Novi Pazar	2013–14	23	5	2	0	0	0	–		25	5
Novi Pazar	Total	35	8	2	0	0	0	–		37	8
Borac Čačak	2014–15	24	4	1	0	0	0	–		25	4
Borac Čačak	2015–16	2	0	0	0	0	0	–		2	0
Borac Čačak	Total	26	4	1	0	0	0	–		27	4
Radnik Surdulica	2015–16	9	1	0	0	0	0	–		9	1
Novi Pazar	2016–17	14	0	1	0	0	0	–		15	0
Career total		273	43	7	1	9	0	1	0	290	44

=== International ===
Serbia national team
Year	Apps	Goals
2008	1	0
2009	1	0
Total	2	0

== Honours ==
Javor Ivanjica

- Serbian First League: 2007–08

Malmö FF

- Allsvenskan: 2010
