= Joseph Elanga =

Cameroonian footballer (born 1979)

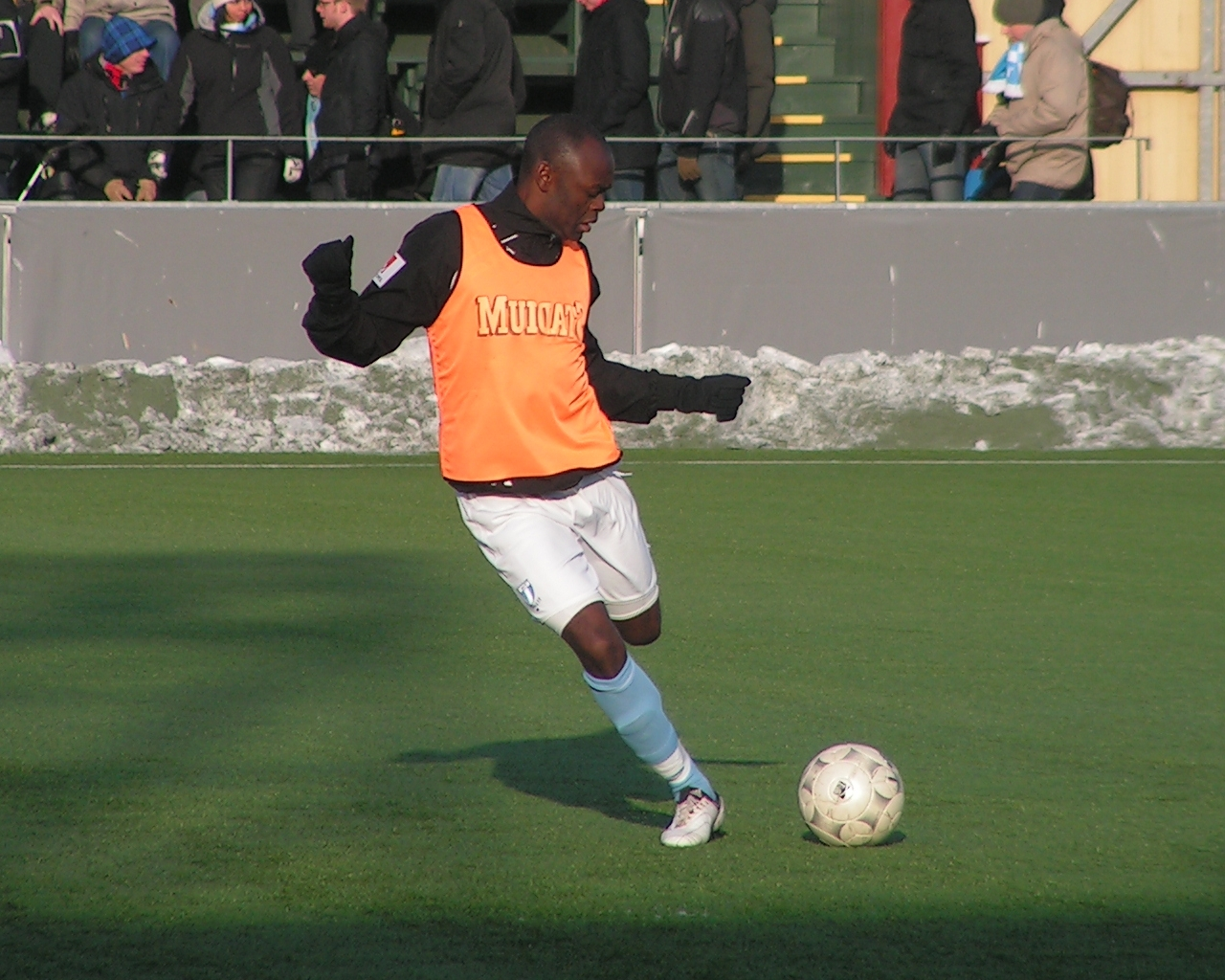
- Elanga with Malmö FF in 2010

Personal information
- Full name: Joseph Elanga Fils
- Date of birth: 2 May 1979 (age 47)
- Place of birth: Yaoundé, Cameroon
- Height: 1.81 m (5 ft 11 in)
- Position: Defender

Youth career
- 1993–1997: C.N.P.S.

Senior career*
Years	Team	Apps	(Gls)
1997–1998	Canon Yaoundé	0	(0)
1998–1999	PAOK	17	(0)
1999–2000	Apollon Kalamarias	29	(1)
2000–2005	Malmö FF	130	(6)
2006–2009	Brøndby	33	(1)
2008–2009	→ Horsens (loan)	32	(1)
2010	Malmö FF	10	(0)
Total		251	(9)

International career
1998–2002	Cameroon	17	(0)
- * Club domestic league appearances and goals

Joseph Elanga Fils (born 2 May 1979) is a Cameroonian former professional footballer who played as a defender. Starting off his career in Cameroon in the late 1990s, he went on to play professionally in Greece, Sweden and Denmark before retiring in 2012. A full international between 1998 and 2002, he won 17 caps for the Cameroon national team and represented his country at the 1998 FIFA World Cup.

== Club career ==
=== Early career ===
Elanga was born in Yaoundé, Cameroon. After leaving the country in 1998 Elanga started his European career in Greece playing for PAOK and Apollon Kalamarias.

=== Malmö FF ===
After a year in each club Elanga left Greece in 2000 to transfer to Swedish club Malmö FF. He stayed at the club for six seasons, playing 130 league games and winning the Swedish championship in 2004.

=== Brøndby IF ===
In 2005 Elanga left for Denmark and Brøndby IF. After a couple of tough seasons he went on loan at fellow Danish club AC Horsens. His contract with Brøndby ended in 2009 and Elanga became a free agent.

=== Return to Malmö and retirement ===
In early 2010, Elanga announced that he would be training with his old team Malmö FF for a week, a few weeks later he signed a new contract with Malmö and returned to the club after four years. For the 2010 season Elanga had very limited playtime as he was only the second choice for the left back position behind Ricardinho, however he did get the chance to play for a couple of games in the beginning of the season when Ricardinho was injured and a few other games. In the end he played enough games to win his second Allsvenskan title with the club.

Elanga's contract was not renewed and he moved to his family in Borås to find a new club to play for. On 9 January 2012, he announced his decision to end his playing career to focus on studying for a UEFA Pro Licence and become a coach.

== International career ==
Elanga represented the Cameroon national team at the 1998 FIFA World Cup, but did not play as Cameroon was eliminated after the group stage. He won a total of 17 caps for his country.

== Personal life ==
Joseph Elanga is the father of Swedish football player Anthony Elanga who plays for Newcastle United.

== Honours ==
Malmö FF

- Allsvenskan: 2004, 2010
