= Prince Eboagwu =

Nigerian footballer

Personal information
- Full name: Etuwe Prince Eboagwu
- Date of birth: 7 June 1986 (age 40)
- Place of birth: Lagos, Nigeria
- Height: 1.90 m (6 ft 3 in)
- Positions: Central defender; defensive midfielder

Team information
- Current team: IK Brage
- Number: 24

Youth career
- AS Racing FC Lagos

Senior career*
Years	Team	Apps	(Gls)
2002–2003	Doxa Katokopias F.C.	32	(4)
2004–2005	FK MKT Araz	34	(5)
2006–2007	Sabah FA	20	(4)
2007–2009	Đồng Tâm Long An F.C.	24	(5)
2010–2011	Åtvidabergs FF	28	(5)
2012–2013	IK Brage	14	(1)
2013–2014	Syrianska IF	34	(4)
2015	FK Kruoja Pakruojis		

International career^{‡}
	Nigeria U20	6	
	Nigeria U23	2	
- * Club domestic league appearances and goals as of 4 September 2013 ‡ National team caps and goals as of 4 September 2013

Prince Eboagwu (born 7 June 1986) is a Nigerian footballer who plays for IK Brage in the Swedish Superettan as a central defender or defensive midfielder.
