= Roland Nilsson =

Swedish footballer and manager

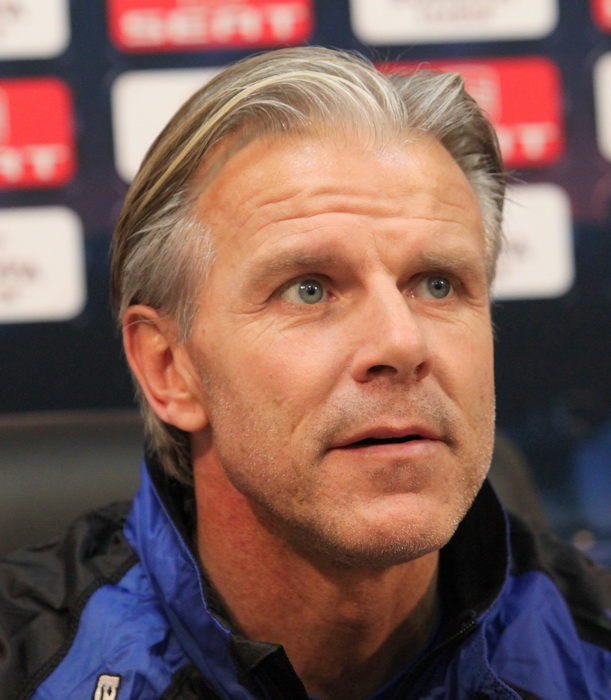
- Nilsson in 2011

Personal information
- Full name: Nils Lennart Roland Nilsson
- Date of birth: 27 November 1963 (age 62)
- Place of birth: Helsingborg, Sweden
- Height: 1.79 m (5 ft 10 in)
- Position: Defender

Youth career
- 1974–1980: Helsingborgs IF

Senior career*
Years	Team	Apps	(Gls)
1981–1982	Helsingborgs IF	38	(3)
1983–1989	IFK Göteborg	124	(7)
1989–1994	Sheffield Wednesday	151	(2)
1994–1997	Helsingborgs IF	64	(0)
1997–1999	Coventry City	60	(0)
1999–2001	Helsingborgs IF	40	(4)
2001–2002	Coventry City	9	(0)
2004–2006	GAIS	7	(0)
Total		446	(12)

International career
1980	Sweden U16	4	(1)
1981–1982	Sweden U18	19	(6)
1984–1986	Sweden U21	13	(1)
1987–1988	Sweden Olympic	9	(0)
1986–2000	Sweden	116	(1)

Managerial career
- 2001–2002: Coventry City
- 2004–2007: GAIS
- 2008–2011: Malmö FF
- 2011–2012: Copenhagen
- 2014–2017: Sweden U17
- 2017–2020: Sweden U21
- 2020–2021: IFK Göteborg
Medal record
Sweden
FIFA World Cup
Bronze medal – third place	1994
- * Club domestic league appearances and goals

Nils Lennart Roland Nilsson (born 27 November 1963) is a Swedish professional football manager and former player. He was most recently the head coach of Allsvenskan club IFK Göteborg. As a player, Nilsson played 116 games for Sweden, making him the sixth most capped player in the Sweden national team. He also won the UEFA Cup and played in the semi-finals of the World Cup, the European Championships, and the European Cup during a playing career lasting over two decades. He won his first major honour as a manager in 2010 with Malmö FF when the team won Allsvenskan. On 1 April 2011 Copenhagen confirmed Nilsson as the club's new manager to replace Ståle Solbakken who left Copenhagen to become manager of 1. FC Köln in the summer of 2011. Nilsson joined Copenhagen on 1 June 2011 but was sacked after six months on 9 January 2012.

== Playing career ==
Born in Helsingborg, Nilsson began his playing career, during which he played predominantly as a right back, as a seventeen-year-old with his hometown club Helsingborgs IF. He quickly established himself as a first-team player with Di Röe, earning himself the reputation of being one of the top youngsters in Swedish football. The quality of his performances was such that in 1983 he was signed by IFK Göteborg, who at that point were the pre-eminent team in Sweden.

Despite the promise that he had shown at Helsingborg, Nilsson spent most of his first two seasons with IFK on the bench. However, he did eventually establish himself in the team, first becoming a regular starter during the 1985 season. It was during the latter end of that season that IFK began their run to the semi-final of the European Cup; IFK knocked out the likes of Fenerbahçe and Aberdeen before eventually falling to Barcelona on penalties. Nilsson missed one of the penalties in the shootout.

On 1 May 1986, shortly after IFK's European Cup exit, Nilsson made his international debut. Sweden's opponents in that game were Greece, the match ended 0–0. During the year that followed he played a key role in IFK's UEFA Cup success, during which the team knocked out, amongst others, Internazionale before beating Dundee United in the final. Besides this, IFK also won the Allsvenskan in 1987.

Nilsson left IFK in December 1989, joining Sheffield Wednesday of the English Football League First Division for £375,000. Despite being relegated at the end of his first season with the club, Nilsson decided to stay and helped them gain promotion at their first attempt. During the time he spent at Wednesday, Nilsson became a real favourite amongst the club's fans as his performances proved to be a catalyst for a footballing renaissance at Hillsborough. In the years that Nilsson played for the club, Wednesday won the League Cup in 1991, finished runner-up in the FA Cup and the League Cup in 1993, and played in Europe for the first time in thirty years. A number of Wednesday's fans still consider Nilsson to be the best right-back, and perhaps even the best foreigner, to ever play for the club. This was confirmed in 2007 when he came out top in a poll on Vital Football to find the club's greatest ever right-back.

While playing for Sheffield Wednesday, Nilsson also took part in two international tournaments for his country. The 1990 World Cup proved to be disastrous for Sweden, who were in the same group as Brazil, Scotland, and Costa Rica; Sweden lost all three matches 2–1. However, the team bounced back in Euro 1992, which they hosted, as they reached the semi-finals. Nilsson played in all the games played by Sweden in both tournaments.

In January 1994, Nilsson announced that he was suffering from homesickness and asked to be sold to a Swedish club. His manager, Trevor Francis, convinced him to remain with the club until the end of the season in return for being given an unconditional release at that time. After leaving Sheffield Wednesday, Nilsson rejoined Helsingborg. That summer Nilsson also represented his country in the World Cup, he played every second as the team finished, somewhat surprisingly, in third place.

Nilsson spent the following three years playing for Helsingborg, during which time the club finished as runner-up in both the Allsvenskan and the Svenska Cupen. In 1996, he was awarded the Guldbollen, a trophy given each year to the best player from Sweden. At this point, Nilsson had planned to see out the rest of his career with his hometown club. However, in 1997 Ron Atkinson, who had signed Nilsson when he was manager at Sheffield Wednesday and was now Director of Football at Coventry City, made a £200,000 offer to sign him; an offer that Nilsson accepted.

Despite being 33, Nilsson was far from being the club's oldest player; Steve Ogrizovic and Kevin Richardson were both in their late thirties, whilst Gordon Strachan was forty.

Nilsson spent one further season at Coventry before once again returning to Helsingborg, where he spent the following two seasons. The last international tournament in which Nilsson played was Euro 2000. He started Sweden's opening game against the co-hosts, Belgium; however, he was substituted at half-time in the game with a concussion after a defensive error, which allowed Bart Goor to put Belgium ahead, Nilsson played no further part in the tournament. Despite this snub, he played a further four games for Sweden, the last coming on 11 October 2000 against Slovakia, the result of that game, like his international debut, was 0–0.

Under his managing years with GAIS, Nilsson occasionally had to make "comebacks" and play himself due to player injuries.

== Managerial career ==
=== Coventry City ===
Coventry City were relegated from the Premier League in May 2001, and following a poor start to their first season in Division One, Gordon Strachan resigned from the club. Nilsson was brought in as a player-caretaker manager, despite having no managerial experience, in place of Strachan. Following a number of wins in his caretaker role, Nilsson was given the manager's job on a permanent basis, and the club briefly topped Division One after the turn of the new year. However, Coventry City failed to live up to this early promise and the team were dogged by inconsistency for most of the season. In January 2002 vetern manager Jim Smith was appointed as Nilsson's assistant and in April 2002 Nilsson announced his retirement from playing in order to focus on managing the club. This was not to prove successful, and, with Coventry out of the play-off chase, Nilsson and Smith were sacked in April 2002. Nilsson was manager for 43 league games and achieved a win percentage of 44.13%, a return bettered by only four other Coventry City managers.

=== GAIS ===
After leaving Coventry, Nilsson briefly worked as a youth team coach at Helsingborg, before he was appointed GAIS manager on 18 December 2003. The club was promoted to Allsvenskan in 2005 for the first time in six years, after beating Landskrona BoIS 2–1 on aggregate in the promotion/relegation play-off.

=== Malmö FF ===
On 10 October 2007, Malmö FF announced that Nilsson had signed a four-year contract as manager, replacing Sören Åkeby. This proved to be a controversial move, since Malmö are the main rivals of Helsingborg and IFK Göteborg, two of Nilsson's former clubs. He enjoyed little success during his first two seasons at Malmö FF, and his side finished in mid-table positions in both 2008 and 2009. In 2010, however, he finally managed to create a winning team from the squad left by Åkeby, and the team enjoyed top league positions throughout the season finally winning the league. Nilsson managed the club for the last time in a Svenska Cupen fixture, which Malmö FF won 3–0 against Halmstad BK at Örjans Vall, Halmstad.

=== Copenhagen ===
After a long period of rumors it was announced on 1 April 2011, Nilsson would take over as manager in Copenhagen after Ståle Solbakken. Nilsson joined the club on 1 June 2011. On 9 January 2012, just six months after his recruitment, despite leading the Danish Superliga at the time, he was sacked and replaced by the sporting director Carsten V. Jensen.

== Career statistics ==
=== International ===
Appearances and goals by national team and year
National team	Year	Apps	Goals
Sweden	1986	6	0
Sweden	1987	5	0
Sweden	1988	8	0
Sweden	1989	9	0
Sweden	1990	9	0
Sweden	1991	4	0
Sweden	1992	8	0
Sweden	1993	8	0
Sweden	1994	15	0
Sweden	1995	4	0
Sweden	1996	11	0
Sweden	1997	6	0
Sweden	1998	6	0
Sweden	1999	7	0
Sweden	2000	10	1
Total		116	1

Scores and results list Sweden's goal tally first, score column indicates score after each Nilsson goal.

List of international goals scored by Roland Nilsson
No.	Date	Venue	Opponent	Score	Result	Competition	Ref.
1	3 June 2000	Nya Ullevi, Gothenburg, Sweden	Spain	1–1	1–1	Friendly	

== Honours ==
=== Player ===
IFK Göteborg

- Allsvenskan: 1983, 1984, 1987
- UEFA Cup: 1986–87

Sheffield Wednesday

- Football League Cup: 1990–91; runner-up: 1992–93
- FA Cup runner-up: 1992–93

Helsingborgs IF

- Allsvenskan: 1999

Sweden

- FIFA World Cup third place: 1994

Individual

- Guldbollen: 1996
- Swedish Defender of the Year: 1996, 1999
- Årets Ärkeängel: 1988

=== Manager ===
Malmö FF

- Allsvenskan: 2010

Individual

- Swedish Manager of the Year: 2010

== See also ==
- List of men's footballers with 100 or more international caps
