= Agon Mehmeti =

Albanian footballer (born 1989)

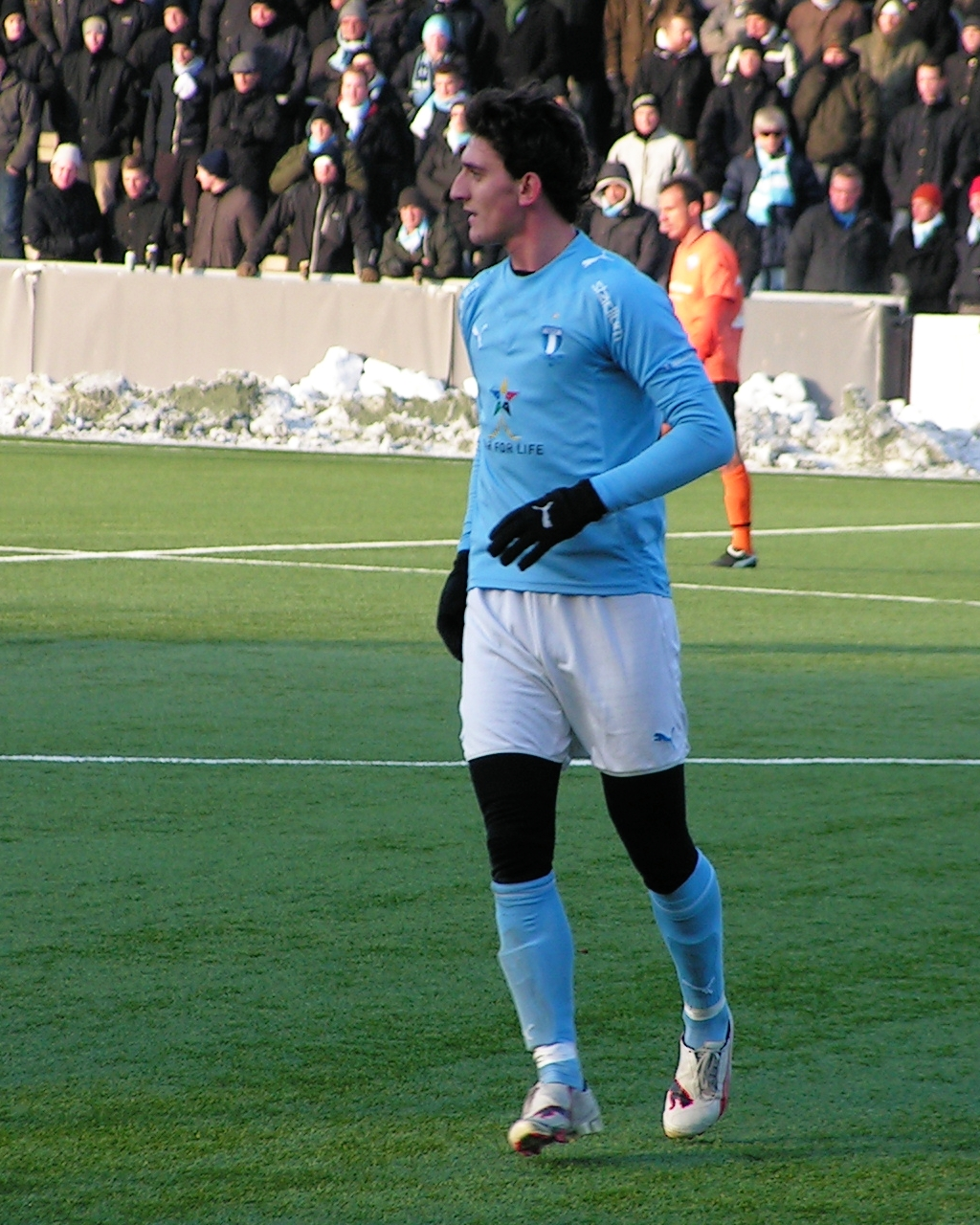
- Mehmeti playing for Malmö FF in 2010

Personal information
- Full name: Agon Xhevat Mehmeti
- Date of birth: 20 November 1989 (age 36)
- Place of birth: Podujevë, SR Serbia, Yugoslavia (modern Kosovo)
- Height: 1.84 m (6 ft 0 in)
- Position: Forward

Youth career
- –2002: IFK Malmö
- 2002–2007: Malmö FF

Senior career*
Years	Team	Apps	(Gls)
2008–2011	Malmö FF	88	(23)
2012–2014	Palermo	3	(0)
2012–2013	→ Novara (loan)	23	(6)
2013–2014	→ Olhanense (loan)	20	(2)
2014–2016	Malmö FF	25	(4)
2016	Stabæk	24	(4)
2017	Gençlerbirliği	1	(0)
2017–2018	Oxford United	13	(1)
2019–2021	Örebro SK	52	(10)

International career
2008	Sweden U19	4	(2)
2009–2010	Sweden U21	8	(2)
2013	Albania	3	(0)
- * Club domestic league appearances and goals

Agon Xhevat Mehmeti (born 20 November 1989) is a former professional footballer who played as a forward. Born in Yugoslavia, he represented Albania internationally.

== Club career ==
=== Malmö FF ===
Mehmeti began his football career at IFK Malmö before moving to join Malmö FF in 2002. While progressing at the club, he progressed throughout the development and impressed as "an offensive team player, outward forward". Having scored 45 goals in 43 appearances during his time at the club's youth system, Mehmeti was promoted to the first team for the 2008 season. Shortly after, he signed his first professional contract with the club.

Mehmeti made his Allsvenskan debut, coming on as a 79th-minute substitute, in a 1–1 draw against IFK Göteborg in the opening game of the season on 31 March 2008. Since making his debut for the club, his playing time mostly comes from the substitute bench. His first goals came in dramatic style. With Malmö FF trailing Kalmar FF 2–1, Mehmeti was subbed on in the 83rd minute. He struck the net twice, lifting Malmö to a 3–2 victory. He then made his first start for the club, starting the whole game, in a 1–0 win against AIK on 22 October 2008. Mehmeti later scored his third goal of the season, in a 6–0 win against GIF Sundsvall in the last game of the season. Despite suffering injuries during the 2008 season, Mehmeti went on to make twenty–one appearances and scoring three times in all competitions.

However at the start of the 2009 season, Mehmeti suffered a groin injury and missed the opening game of the season. He made his first appearance of the season against Örgryte, scoring twice in a 3–0 win on 13 April 2009. In a follow–up match against AIK, Mehmeti scored his third goal of the season, in a 3–0 win. However, he suffered a groin injury that saw him miss two matches. Mehmeti then returned to the starting line–up, coming on as a 70th-minute substitute, in a 0–0 draw against Örebro SK on 20 May 2009. On 27 July 2009 he scored twice against Halmstad, having come on as an 80th-minute substitute, as Malmö FF won 3–0. Mehmeti scored his fifth goal of the season, in a 3–1 win against Hammarby on 27 September 2009. Since the start of the 2009 season, Mehmeti fought for a starting spot, but retained his role as the super-sub, as he scored five goals. Despite being sidelined later in the 2009 season, Mehmeti made twenty–three appearances and scoring six times, mostly coming on as a substitute, in all competitions.

Ahead of the 2010 season, Mehmeti said that he wasn't happy of earning a nickname of Super sub and aim to earn a place in the starting line–up. At the start of the 2010 season, Mehmeti scored his first goals of the season, in a 3–0 win against Örebro SK. However, during a 2–0 win against Trelleborg on 2 May 2010, he suffered an injury, resulting in his substitution in the 10th minute and missed one match as a result. After missing one match, he scored his second goal of the season, in a 3–1 win against Åtvidaberg. On 24 July 2010 Mehmeti scored his third goal of the season, in a 1–0 win against AIK. He then scored four matches in three matches between 7 August 2010 and 23 August 2010. Mehmeti then scored his ninth goal of the season, as well as, setting up the club's second goal of the game, in a 3–3 draw against Åtvidabergs on 11 September 2010. He then scored two goals against Mjällby and Brommapojkarna in the last two matches that saw the club win the league for the first time since 2004. Since the start of the 2010 season, Mehmeti finally took a starting spot, starting 23 out of 30 possible. He was Malmö FF's top goalscorer for their league winning season in 2010, when he netted 14 goals of which eleven were league goals.

At the start of the 2011 season, Mehmeti started the season well when he scored two goals against Trelleborgs and Halmstads in the first two league matches. However, in a 3–0 loss against IF Elfsborg on 24 April 2011, Mehmeti suffered a groin injury and was substituted in the 40th minute. But he returned to the starting line–up against IFK Göteborg on 2 May 2011 and started the whole game, in a 2–0 loss. Two months later on 13 July 2011, Mehmeti made his UEFA Champions League debut, where he started and played 88 minutes, in a 2–0 win against Havnar Bóltfelag in the first leg of the second round of the tournament. In the return leg against Havnar Bóltfelag, Mehmeti helped the side go through to the next round after a 1–1 draw. A month later, he scored his third goal of the season, in a 4–1 loss against Dinamo Zagreb in the first leg of the UEFA Champions League Play–Offs Round. In the return leg, Mehmeti started the match and played 78 minutes before being substituted, as Malmö FF won 2–0 but lost 4–3 on aggregate. He later ended his six months goal drought in the league, scoring his fourth goal of the season, in a 1–0 win against BK Häcken on 13 October 2011. Four days later on 17 October 2011, Mehmeti scored his fifth goal of the season, in a 1–0 win against Syrianska. However, Mehmeti's 2011 season was not as successful as his previous ones, as he was troubled by light injuries. Despite his contract running out at the end of the season, Mehmeti scored five goals in 34 matches in all competitions.

Mehmeti chose not to renew his contract after the 2011 season. During his time at Malmö FF, Mehmeti was a fan favourite among the supporters.

=== Palermo ===
Palermo's director of sports, Luca Cattani, confirmed Mehmeti's signing on 9 November 2011. On 11 November 2011, Mehmeti also confirmed a five-year deal with Palermo, which made him a Palermo player until 30 June 2016. At the press conference, Mehmeti refuted media comparisons to Zlatan Ibrahimović, due to their ethnic background and previous club, saying that it was too early to compare.

Mehmeti made his debut for Palermo in the home fixture against Napoli on 8 January 2012. He made a further two appearances from the bench during the 2011–12 season. However, ahead of the 2012–13 season, Mehmeti was expected to be loaned out to get first team football.

==== Loan spells from Palermo ====
On 30 August 2012, Mehmeti moved on loan to Novara in exchange for Italian winger Luigi Giorgi. He made his Novara debut, coming on as 63rd-minute substitute, and set up the club's second goal of the game for Pablo González, in a 2–2 draw against Empoli on 1 September 2012. In a follow–up match against Cesena, Mehmeti scored a hat–trick (his first in his professional career), in a 4–1 win. After missing four matches, Mehmeti returned to the starting line–up against Brescia on 13 October 2012 and scored his fourth goal of the season, in a 4–2 win. Two weeks later on 27 October 2012, he scored again, in a 1–1 draw against Varese. After missing two matches, Mehmeti returned to the starting line–up against Padova on 8 December 2012 and set up the club's third goal of the game, in a 3–1 win. In a follow–up match against Bari, he scored his sixth goal for the club, in a 3–1 win. Having become a first team since making his debut for the club, Mehmeti soon lost his first team place and was demoted to the substitute bench later in the season. Despite this, he made an appearance in the second leg of the Serie B promotion play–offs against Empoli and played 32 minutes, as they lost 4–1. Mehmeti stayed at Novara for the remainder of the 2012–13 season, where he played 23 matches and netted six goals for the club. Following this, Mehmeti returned to his parent club.

In July 2013, it was announced that Mehmeti would go to Olhanense in the Primeira Liga for a season-long loan deal. He made his Olhanense debut in the opening game of the season, starting a match and played 77 minutes before being substituted, in a 2–0 loss against Vitória de Guimarães. Seven days later on 24 August 2013, he scored his first goal for the team in his second league game, in a 1–0 win against Paços de Ferreira. On 12 January 2014 Mehmeti scored his second goal for the club, in a 2–1 win against Vitória. At the end of the 2013–14 season, Mehmeti played the total of 21 matches while at Olhanense, scoring twice.

=== Return to Malmö FF ===
On 15 July 2014, Malmö FF announced that they had reacquired Mehmeti on a three-and-a-half-year-long contract, making his return after two seasons abroad in Italy and Portugal, after having been released for free by his last club Palermo earlier the same day.

Mehmeti made his Malmö FF debut in the second spell, starting a match and played 61 minutes before being substituted, in a 1–1 draw against Kalmar on 19 July 2014. He then scored twice, both goals in the away match against Falkenbergs FF on 2 August 2014. Having helped the club reach the UEFA Champions League group stage, Mehmeti made four appearances in the club's run in the 2014–15 UEFA Champions League. For the remainder of the season, Mehmeti made ten league appearances, five of them in the starting line-up, as Malmö FF won both the Allsvenskan and Svenska Supercupen. As a result, he made fifteen appearances and scoring two times in all competitions.

At the start of the 2015 season, Mehmeti started the season well when he scored his first goal of the season, in a 4–0 win against Jönköpings Södra in the group stage of the Svenska Supercupen. A month later on 20 April 2015, Mehmeti scored his second goal of the season, having come on as the 85th-minute substitute, in a 3–1 win against Hammarby. Three months later on 11 July 2015, he scored his third goal of the season, having come on as an 82nd-minute substitute, in a 2–2 draw against Örebro SK. However, his first team opportunities was later overshadowed with injuries and competitions within the striker position. At the end of the 2015 season, Mehmeti went on to make twenty–two appearances and scoring three times in all competitions.

=== Stabæk ===
Mehmeti then moved across the border to Norway by joining Eliteserien side Stabæk, signing a three–year contract, keeping him until 2018.

Mehmeti made his Stabæk debut in the opening game of the season against Molde, starting the whole game, in a 2–1 loss. In a follow–up match against Bodø/Glimt, he set up the club's only goal of the game, in a 3–1 loss. Since making his debut for Stabæk, Mehmeti quickly became a first-team regular, playing in the striker position. On 13 April 2016 he scored his first goal of the season, in a 4–1 win against Korsvoll in the first round of the Norwegian Cup. Four days later on 17 April 2016, Mehmeti scored his second goal of the season, in a 1–1 draw against Sarpsborg 08. He then scored three goals in two matches between 1 May 2016 and 4 May 2016 against Odds BK and Bærum. Two months later, Mehmeti added two more goals, coming against Lillestrøm and Tromsø on 10 July 2016 and 24 July 2016 respectively. At the end of the 2016 season, he made twenty–nine appearances and scoring seven times in all competitions.

=== Gençlerbirliği and Oxford United ===
It was announced on 12 January 2017 that Mehmeti moved to the Turkish capital Ankara, to play for Gençlerbirliği. He scored on his Gençlerbirliği debut, having come on as second-half substitute, in a 3–2 loss against Menemenspor in the Turkish Cup. However, he was plagued by injuries, as he played only one Süper Lig games for them and left Gençlerbirliği by mutual consent at the end of the 2016–17 season.

After leaving Gençlerbirliği, Mehmeti moved to England, joining the English League One side Oxford United on 7 September 2017. He made his league debut as a substitute in a 3–0 defeat at Bury on 26 September 2017. Mehmeti scored his debut goal in the following league fixture, a 4–1 away win against Peterborough United on 30 September 2017. However, during an EFL Trophy match against Brighton & Hove Albion U23 on 3 October 2017, he tore his hamstring and was substituted as a result. Following this, it was announced that Mehmeti would be sidelined for "several weeks". On 30 December 2017 he returned from injury, coming on as a 72nd-minute substitute, in a 3–2 loss against Bradford City. Mehmeti played in the round of 16 in the EFL Trophy against Charlton Athletic, converting the winning penalty as Oxford United won 3–0 in the shootout following a 1–1 draw on 9 January 2018. As the season progressed, he found himself in and out of the starting line-up. At the end of the 2017–18 season, the club announced that Mehmeti was among eight players to be released. By the time he departed from Oxford United, he had made sixteen appearances and scored once in all competitions.

=== Örebro SK ===
Having spent the rest of 2018 without a club, Mehmeti returned to Sweden for the first time in three years to sign for Örebro SK on a one–year contract on 11 March 2019.

After being absent from the starting line-up since joining the club, Mehmeti made his Örebro SK debut, coming on as a 73rd-minute substitute, in a 1–0 loss against Helsingborg on 28 June 2019. He then set up the club's fourth goal of the game, in a 4–1 win against Helsingborgs on 29 July 2019. On 18 August 2019 Mehmeti scored his first goal for the club, in a 2–1 loss against BK Häcken. A month later on 25 September 2019, he scored his second goal for the club, in a 2–0 win against Östersund. Towards the end of the 2019 season, Mehmeti signed a two–year contract with the club. Despite spending his first season at the club, mostly coming on as a substitute, he made fourteen appearances and scoring two times in all competitions.

== International career ==
Mehmeti told the Albanian media that he was eligible to play for either Sweden, or Albania in the future.

=== Sweden ===
In March 2008, Mehmeti was called up to the Sweden U19 team for the first time. He made his Sweden U19 debut on 25 March 2008, scoring twice against Slovakia U19. Mehmeti went on to make four appearances and scoring two times for the U19 side.

In May 2009, Mehmeti was called up to the Sweden under-21 team for the first time. Three months later on 12 August 2009, he made his Sweden U21 debut, starting a match and played 62 minutes, in a 4–2 win against Denmark U21. Mehmeti then scored his first Sweden U21 goal, in a 2–0 win against Montenegro U21 on 4 September 2009. A year later, he scored his second Sweden U21 goal, in a 2–1 loss against Israel U21. In a follow–up match against Bulgaria U21, Mehmeti set up the only goal of the game. Following this, he went on to make eight appearances and scoring two times for the U21 side.

=== Albania ===
In July 2013, Mehmeti was called up to the Albania squad for their final World Cup qualifying matches. On 4 June 2013, he received Albanian citizenship, as did Albania under-21 players Amir Rrahmani, Haxhi Neziraj, Valentin Gjokaj and Herolind Shala. Mehmeti was selected by the Albania national head coach Gianni De Biasi for the World Cup qualifying matches against Slovenia and Iceland in September 2013. He eventually made his Albania debut on 6 September 2013 against Slovenia, coming on as a 71st-minute substitute, in a 1–0 loss.

== Coaching career ==
After the 2022 season, Mehmeti joined Djurgården as a coach to work within their academy. When Djurgården head coaches Kim Bergstrand and Thomas Lagerlöf were sacked in October 2024, Mehmeti became assistant coach to Roberth Björknesjö.

== Personal life ==
Mehmeti was born in Podujevo, then still part of SAP Kosovo, SR Serbia within SFR Yugoslavia. At age two, he moved with his family to Valdemarsvik, Sweden, and they later settled in Malmö. Mehmeti is of Albanian descent. He played for the Sweden under-19s and the under-21s, before deciding to play for Albania.

Growing up, Mehmeti idolised Adriano. He revealed in an interview that his father and older brother both played as goalkeepers. In August 2009, Mehmeti purchased an apartment at Bellevuegårde.

== Career statistics ==
=== Club ===
As of match played 14 April 2018

Appearances and goals by club, season and competition
Club	Season	League			National cup (Note: Appearances in the Norwegian Football Cup, Svenska Cupen, the Taça de Portugal and the Turkish Cup)		League cup		Europe		Other		Total	
Club	Season	Division	Apps	Goals	Apps	Goals	Apps	Goals	Apps	Goals	Apps	Goals	Apps	Goals
Malmö FF	2008	Allsvenskan	21	3	3	1	–		–		–		24	4
Malmö FF	2009	Allsvenskan	22	5	1	0	–		–		–		23	5
Malmö FF	2010	Allsvenskan	24	11	2	0	–		–		–		26	11
Malmö FF	2011	Allsvenskan	21	4	1	0	–		11 (Note: Appearances in the UEFA Champions League)	1	1 (Note: Appearance in Svenska Supercupen)	0	34	5
Malmö FF	Total		88	23	7	1	0	0	11	1	1	0	107	25
Palermo	2011–12	Serie A	3	0	–		–		–		–		3	0
Novara (loan)	2012–13	Serie B	23	6	–		–		–		–		23	6
Olhanense (loan)	2013–14	Primeira Liga	20	2	1	0	–		–		–		21	2
Malmö FF	2014	Allsvenskan	10	2	–		–		4	0	1	0	15	2
Malmö FF	2015	Allsvenskan	15	2	3	1	–		4	0	–		22	3
Malmö FF	Total		25	4	3	1	0	0	8	0	1	0	37	5
Stabæk	2016	Tippeligaen	24	4	3	3	–		2 (Note: Appearances in the UEFA Europa League)	0	–		29	7
Gençlerbirliği	2016–17	Süper Lig	2	0	2	1	–		–		–		4	1
Oxford United	2017–18	League One	13	1	–		–		–		3 (Note: Appearances in the EFL Trophy)	0	16	1
Career total			198	40	16	6	0	0	21	1	5	0	240	47

=== International ===
As of match played 15 October 2013

Appearances and goals by national team and year
National team	Year	Apps	Goals
Albania	2013	3	0
Total		3	0

== Honours ==
Malmö FF

- Allsvenskan: 2010, 2014
- Svenska Supercupen: 2014
