= 2010 Allsvenskan =

86th season of Allsvenskan

Allsvenskan
- Season: 2010
- Champions: Malmö FF; 19th Allsvenskan title 16th Swedish championship title
- Relegated: IF Brommapojkarna; Åtvidabergs FF
- Champions League: Malmö FF
- Europa League: Helsingborgs IF; Örebro SK; IF Elfsborg; BK Häcken
- Matches: 240
- Goals: 600 (2.5 per match)
- Top goalscorer: Alexander Gerndt (20)
- Biggest home win: IF Elfsborg 6–0 Halmstads BK (22 March 2010)
- Biggest away win: BK Häcken 0–4 Malmö FF (27 October 2010) IF Brommapojkarna 0–4 Malmö FF (1 November 2010)
- Highest scoring: Djurgårdens IF 4–4 IF Elfsborg (24 October 2010)
- Highest attendance: 24,148; Malmö FF 2-0 Mjällby AIF (7 November 2010)
- Lowest attendance: 0^{[A]} Djurgårdens IF 0-1 Helsingborgs IF (21 March 2010)
- Average attendance: 6,518

The 2010 Allsvenskan, part of the 2010 Swedish football season, was the 86th Allsvenskan season. It began on 13 March 2010 and ended on 7 November 2010. AIK were the defending champions. Malmö FF secured their 16th title in the last round after winning with 2–0 against Mjällby.

Malmö narrowly beat Scanian rivals Helsingborg to the title, with Örebro being in third. Malmö had gone through five seasons in fifth place or lower after the last title in 2004, marking a major turnaround. It would also serve as a starting point of a strong era for the club, since Malmö won four of the next seven league titles and never finished outside the top four in the rest of the decade.

== Participating teams ==
Locations of the Allsvenskan 2010 teams

Club	Last season	First season in league	First season of current spell
AIK	1st	1924–25	2006
IF Brommapojkarna	12th	2007	2009
Djurgårdens IF	14th	1927–28	2001
IF Elfsborg	3rd	1926–27	1997
GAIS	11th	1924–25	2006
Gefle IF	10th	1933–34	2005
IFK Göteborg	2nd	1924–25	1977
Halmstads BK	13th	1933–34	1993
Helsingborgs IF	8th	1924–25	1993
BK Häcken	5th	1983	2009
Kalmar FF	4th	1949–50	2004
Malmö FF	7th	1931–32	2001
Mjällby AIF	1st (Superettan 2009)	1980	2010
Trelleborgs FF	9th	1985	2007
Åtvidabergs FF	2nd (Superettan 2009)	1951–52	2010
Örebro SK	6th	1946–47	2007

== Overview ==
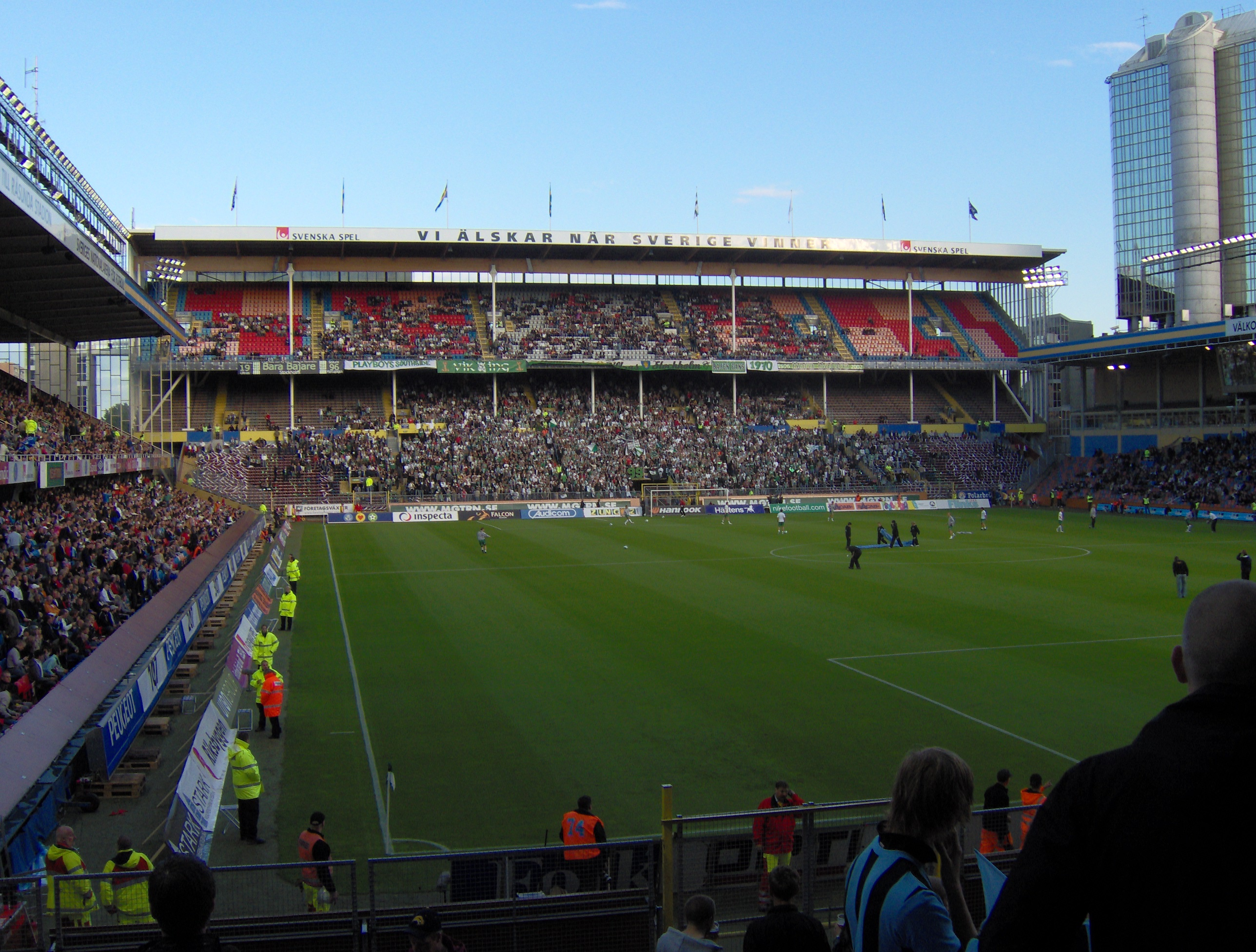
Råsunda Stadium AIK – Capacity 36.608

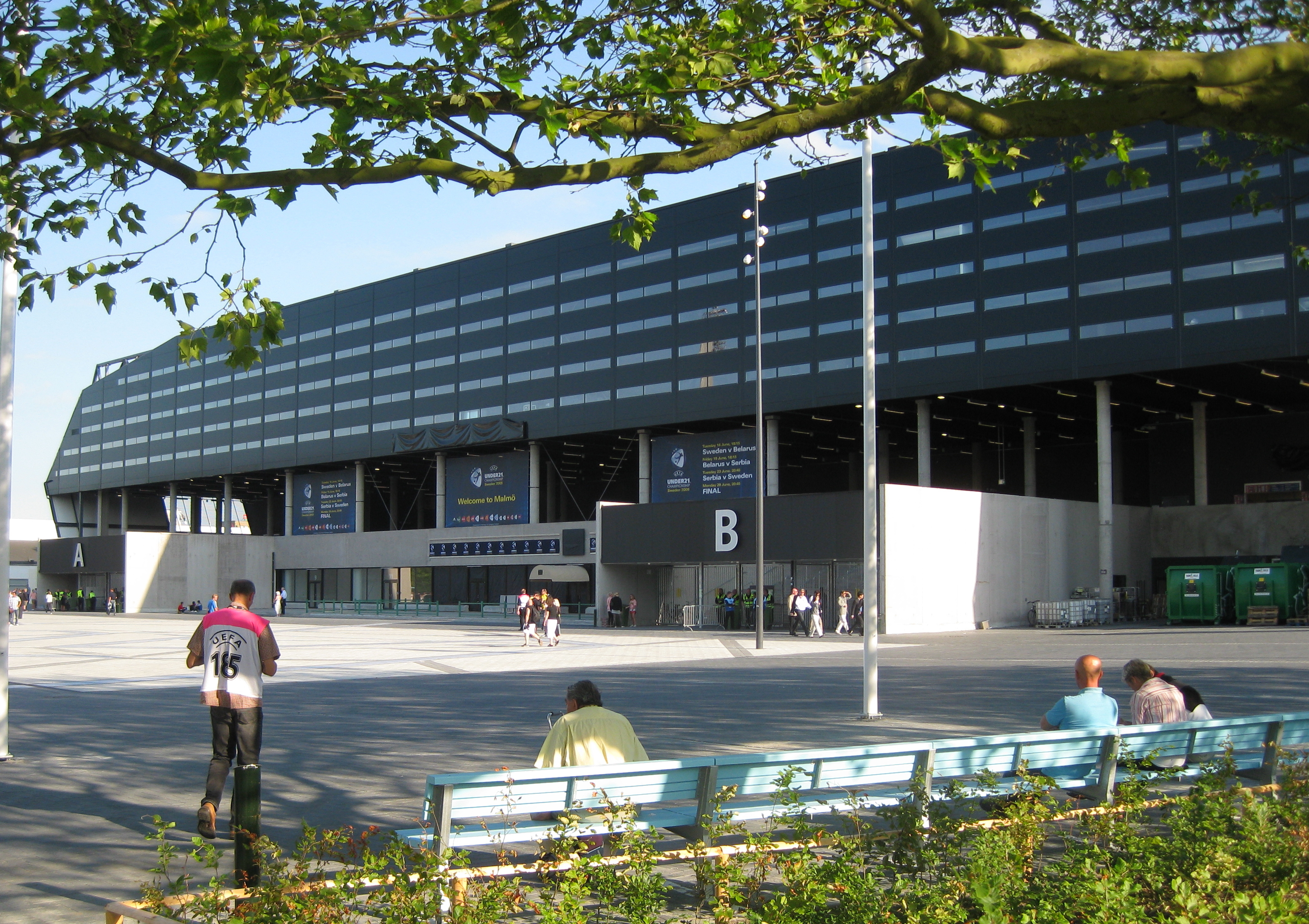
Swedbank Stadion Malmö FF – Capacity: 24.000

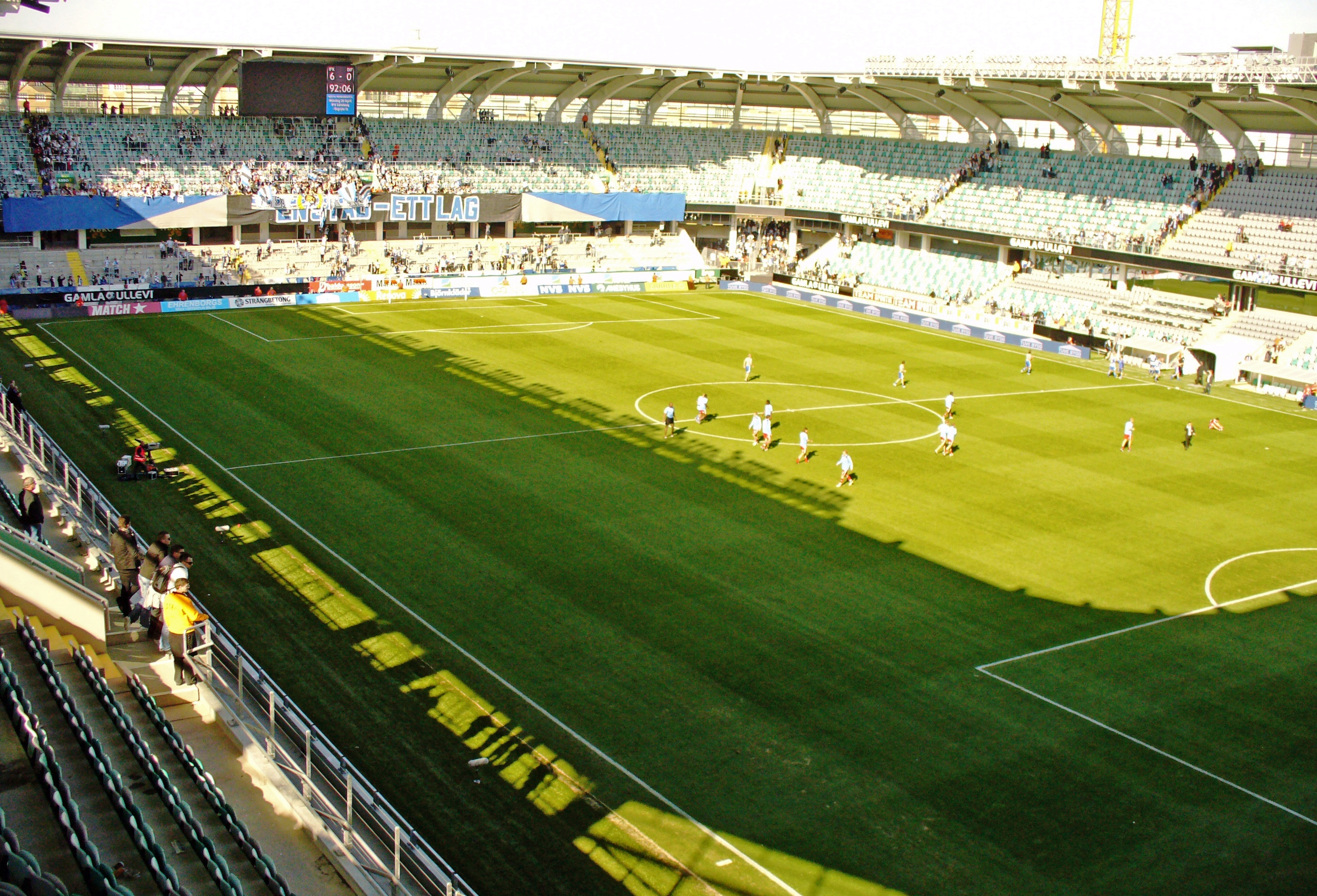
Gamla Ullevi IFK Göteborg and GAIS Capacity 18.800

Team	Location	Arena	Capacity	Average attendance	Manager
AIK	Solna	Råsunda Stadion	36,608	11,925	(Scotland) Alex Miller
IF Brommapojkarna	Stockholm	Grimsta IP	4,500	2,262	(Sweden) Kim Bergstrand
Djurgårdens IF	Stockholm	Stockholms Stadion	14,500	7,178	(Sweden) Lennart Wass (Sweden) Carlos Banda
IF Elfsborg	Borås	Borås Arena	17,800	8,423	(Sweden) Magnus Haglund
GAIS	Gothenburg	Gamla Ullevi	18,800	4,666	(Sweden) Alexander Axén
Gefle IF	Gävle	Strömvallen	7,300	3,500	(Sweden) Per Olsson
Halmstads BK	Halmstad	Örjans Vall	15,500	4,240	(Sweden) Lars Jacobsson
Helsingborgs IF	Helsingborg	Olympia	17,200	10,543	(Sweden) Conny Karlsson
BK Häcken	Gothenburg	Rambergsvallen	7,000	2,576	(Sweden) Peter Gerhardsson
IFK Göteborg	Gothenburg	Gamla Ullevi	18,800	10,489	(Sweden) Stefan Rehn (Sweden) Jonas Olsson
Kalmar FF	Kalmar	Fredriksskans	9,000	4,285	(Sweden) Nanne Bergstrand
Malmö FF	Malmö	Swedbank Stadion	24,000	15,194	(Sweden) Roland Nilsson
Mjällby AIF	Mjällby	Strandvallen	7,500	4,380	(Sweden) Peter Swärdh
Trelleborgs FF	Trelleborg	Vångavallen	10,000	2,911	(Sweden) Tom Prahl
Åtvidabergs FF	Åtvidaberg	Kopparvallen	8,000	4,004	(Sweden) Andreas Thomsson
Örebro SK	Örebro	Behrn Arena	14,500	7,704	(Finland) Sixten Boström

== League table ==
Pos	Team	Pld	W	D	L	GF	GA	GD	Pts	Qualification or relegation
1	Malmö FF (C)	30	21	4	5	59	24	+35	67	Qualification to Champions League second qualifying round
2	Helsingborgs IF	30	20	5	5	49	26	+23	65	Qualification to Europa League third qualifying round (Note: Helsingborg qualified for the Third qualifying round of the Europa League as Svenska Cupen champions 2010.)
3	Örebro SK	30	16	4	10	40	30	+10	52	Qualification to Europa League second qualifying round (Note: Örebro qualified for the Second qualifying round of the Europa League as they received Helsingborgs initial qualifying spot.)
4	IF Elfsborg	30	12	11	7	55	40	+15	47	Qualification to Europa League first qualifying round (Note: Elfsborg qualified for the Europa League as they received Örebro's initial qualifying spot.)
5	Trelleborgs FF	30	13	5	12	39	42	−3	44	
6	Mjällby AIF	30	11	10	9	36	29	+7	43	
7	IFK Göteborg	30	10	10	10	42	29	+13	40	
8	BK Häcken	30	11	7	12	40	42	−2	40	Qualification to Europa League first qualifying round (Note: Sweden was among the best three associations in the UEFA Fair Play ranking and thus received an additional spot in the first qualifying round of the Europa League, Häcken received the qualifying spot for their ranking in Allsvenskans Fair Play ranking.)
9	Kalmar FF	30	10	10	10	36	38	−2	40	
10	Djurgårdens IF	30	11	7	12	35	42	−7	40	
11	AIK	30	10	5	15	29	36	−7	35	
12	Halmstads BK	30	10	5	15	31	42	−11	35	
13	GAIS	30	8	8	14	24	35	−11	32	
14	Gefle IF (O)	30	7	8	15	33	46	−13	29	Qualification to Relegation play-offs
15	Åtvidabergs FF (R)	30	7	8	15	32	51	−19	29	Relegation to Superettan
16	IF Brommapojkarna (R)	30	6	7	17	20	48	−28	25	Relegation to Superettan

Source: svenskfotboll.se (in Swedish)
Rules for classification: 1) points; 2) goal difference; 3) number of goals scored.
(C) Champions; (O) Play-off winners; (R) Relegated

=== Positions by round ===
Note: Some matches are played out of phase with the corresponding round, positions are corrected in hindsight.

Team ╲ Round	1	2	3	4	5	6	7	8	9	10	11	12	13	14	15	16	17	18	19	20	21	22	23	24	25	26	27	28	29	30
Malmö FF	10	4	3	3	2	2	2	2	2	2	2	2	2	2	2	2	2	2	2	2	1	1	1	1	1	1	1	1	1	1
Helsingborgs IF	4	2	2	2	1	1	1	1	1	1	1	1	1	1	1	1	1	1	1	1	2	2	2	2	2	2	2	2	2	2
Örebro SK	2	8	10	7	9	8	4	3	4	3	3	3	3	3	3	3	3	3	4	3	3	3	3	3	3	3	3	3	3	3
IF Elfsborg	6	3	5	6	7	7	8	5	3	4	4	5	5	5	5	5	4	4	3	4	4	4	4	4	4	4	4	4	4	4
Trelleborgs FF	12	9	12	12	13	11	13	14	16	16	15	16	15	16	15	13	11	11	9	10	11	10	9	9	9	11	9	9	6	5
Mjällby AIF	11	5	4	4	4	4	3	4	5	5	6	4	4	4	4	4	5	5	5	5	5	7	6	8	6	7	6	5	5	6
IFK Göteborg	1	7	9	10	11	13	11	11	12	12	11	13	12	13	9	12	9	7	6	7	7	6	5	5	5	6	5	6	8	7
BK Häcken	3	1	1	1	3	3	5	6	9	10	13	10	9	12	8	11	7	10	13	12	8	8	10	10	10	9	10	10	10	8
Kalmar FF	16	12	14	13	14	14	15	15	13	13	12	8	8	6	6	6	6	6	7	9	10	9	8	7	8	8	7	7	9	9
Djurgårdens IF	13	15	15	14	10	12	12	12	10	8	7	7	7	10	12	10	13	12	10	6	6	5	7	6	7	5	8	8	7	10
AIK	5	10	13	15	15	15	14	13	15	15	16	15	15	14	14	15	15	15	11	13	14	14	15	13	14	14	14	13	11	11
Halmstads BK	9	14	8	9	12	10	9	8	7	9	10	12	13	8	11	9	12	13	14	14	12	12	12	12	12	12	12	12	13	12
GAIS	7	13	6	11	6	5	7	9	6	7	5	6	6	9	10	8	10	8	8	8	9	11	11	11	11	10	11	11	12	13
Gefle IF	8	6	7	5	5	6	6	10	11	11	9	11	10	11	13	14	14	14	15	15	15	16	16	15	16	15	15	15	14	14
Åtvidabergs FF	15	16	16	16	16	16	16	16	14	14	14	14	14	15	16	16	16	16	16	16	16	15	13	14	13	13	14	14	15	15
IF Brommapojkarna	14	11	11	8	8	9	10	7	8	6	8	9	11	7	7	7	8	9	12	11	13	13	14	16	15	16	16	16	16	16

Leader and 2011–12 UEFA Champions League second qualifying round
2011–12 UEFA Europa League second qualifying round
2011–12 UEFA Europa League first qualifying round
Relegation play-offs
Relegation to Superettan

Source: everysport.com

== Results ==
Home \ Away	AIK	BP	DIF	IFE	GAI	GIF	IFKG	HBK	HIF	BKH	KFF	MFF	MAIF	TFF	ÅFF	ÖSK
AIK		2–1	1–2	2–0	1–0	2–0	1–2	0–1	2–3	1–1	0–1	2–0	0–0	1–0	4–1	0–1
IF Brommapojkarna	0–0		0–1	2–2	1–0	2–1	1–2	1–0	1–3	2–1	2–3	0–4	1–0	0–3	0–2	0–1
Djurgårdens IF	2–1	0–0		4–4	1–1	1–1	2–0	0–2	0–1	0–3	0–2	1–0	1–0	3–0	2–1	2–1
IF Elfsborg	4–0	1–0	3–1		1–0	1–0	1–1	6–0	1–3	0–0	4–1	2–2	2–0	4–1	4–1	3–3
GAIS	3–1	1–1	0–1	0–2		2–1	0–0	1–1	0–0	2–1	2–2	0–0	3–2	1–3	0–0	0–1
Gefle IF	1–0	2–0	2–2	0–0	1–0		0–0	1–2	1–3	0–2	0–0	1–3	3–3	1–3	4–2	1–3
IFK Göteborg	4–0	1–1	1–1	5–1	2–1	2–2		3–0	0–0	0–1	3–1	0–2	0–0	1–2	3–0	0–0
Halmstads BK	1–2	2–0	2–0	1–3	3–0	1–0	1–0		2–4	1–2	2–1	0–2	1–2	0–0	4–0	1–1
Helsingborgs IF	1–0	1–0	3–3	2–1	0–1	3–1	2–0	2–1		3–1	0–0	2–1	2–1	1–0	3–0	2–1
BK Häcken	0–1	5–0	2–1	1–1	0–2	0–2	1–5	2–0	2–1		1–1	0–4	0–1	4–2	0–0	2–1
Kalmar FF	0–3	3–0	0–1	2–2	3–1	1–1	0–3	1–0	1–0	1–3		2–3	1–1	2–1	1–2	4–1
Malmö FF	1–0	2–1	2–1	1–0	1–0	2–0	2–1	1–1	2–0	3–1	0–1		2–0	2–0	3–1	3–0
Mjällby AIF	0–0	0–0	3–0	2–0	3–0	1–3	0–0	2–0	0–1	2–2	0–0	4–2		1–1	2–1	1–0
Trelleborgs FF	4–1	0–1	3–1	1–1	2–0	2–1	2–1	1–0	0–0	3–2	1–1	0–3	2–1		0–3	1–0
Åtvidabergs FF	1–1	4–1	2–1	1–1	0–1	0–1	2–1	1–1	0–3	0–0	0–0	3–3	1–2	3–1		0–2
Örebro SK	1–0	1–1	1–0	3–0	0–2	3–1	2–1	3–0	3–0	2–0	1–0	0–3	0–2	2–0	2–0	

Source: Swedish Football Association (in Swedish)
Legend: Blue = home team win; Yellow = draw; Red = away team win.

== Relegation play-offs ==
10 November 2010
18:45

GIF Sundsvall	0–1	Gefle
	Report	Orlov 54'

Norrporten Arena, Sundsvall
Attendance: 2,639
Referee: Michael Lerjéus (Skövde)

14 November 2010
17:30

Gefle	2–0	GIF Sundsvall
Theorin 52' (pen.); Öhagen 80'	Report

Strömvallen, Gävle
Attendance: 4,318
Referee: Jonas Eriksson (Sigtuna)

Gefle won 3–0 on aggregate.

== Top goalscorers ==
Including matches played on 31 October 2010; Source: fotbollskanalen

Rank	Player	Club	Goals
1	(Sweden) Alexander Gerndt	Gefle/Helsingborg	20
2	(Sweden) Denni Avdić	Elfsborg	19
3	(Sweden) Mathias Ranégie	Häcken	12
4	(Sweden) Agon Mehmeti	Malmö	11
5	(Brazil) Ricardo Santos	Kalmar	10
5	(Netherlands) Moestafa El Kabir	Mjällby	10
5	(Sweden) Tobias Hysén	IFK Göteborg	10
5	(Sweden) Daniel Larsson	Malmö	10
9	(Brazil) Daniel Mendes	Kalmar	9
9	(Nigeria) Kennedy Igboananike	Djurgården	9

== Attendances ==
#	Club	Average	Highest
1	Malmö FF	15,194	24,148
2	AIK	11,925	21,181
3	Helsingborgs IF	10,543	16,200
4	IFK Göteborg	10,489	17,112
5	IF Elfsborg	8,423	15,499
6	Örebro SK	7,704	10,880
7	Djurgårdens IF	7,656	18,511
8	GAIS	4,666	15,305
9	Mjällby AIF	4,380	7,125
10	Kalmar FF	4,285	6,894
11	Halmstads BK	4,240	8,368
12	Åtvidabergs FF	4,004	7,130
13	Gefle IF	3,500	5,723
14	Trelleborgs FF	2,911	9,049
15	BK Häcken	2,576	6,027
16	IF Brommapojkarna	2,262	5,053

== See also ==
Competitions

- 2010 Superettan
- 2010 Svenska Cupen
- 2010 Supercupen

Team seasons

- 2010 Djurgårdens IF season
- 2010 Halmstads BK season
- 2010 Malmö FF season

Transfers

- List of Swedish football transfers winter 2009–2010
- List of Swedish football transfers summer 2010
- List of Swedish football transfers winter 2010–2011

== Footnotes ==
A. After the victory in the relegation play-off against Assyriska FF in the last match of the 2009 season, supporters of Djurgården stormed the pitch, with at least one player in Assyriska being attacked by hooligans. As a penalty, Djurgårdens IF had to pay a fine of 200,000 SEK and play their next home match (the first of the 2010 season) without any spectators.
