= 2005 AIK Fotboll season =

AIK
2005 season
- Manager: Rikard Norling
- Stadium: Råsunda Stadium
- Superettan: Champions
- Svenska Cupen: Third Round vs Trelleborg
- Top goalscorer: League: Dennis Östlundh (8); All: Dennis Östlundh (9)
- Highest home attendance: 23,460 vs GAIS (25 September 2005)
- Lowest home attendance: 7,031 vs Bodens BK (25 May 2005)
- Average home league attendance: 13,698 (Allsvenskan - 22 October 2005); 13,698 (All competitions - 22 October 2005)

For the 2005 season, AIK Fotboll was relegated to the second flight Superettan, just six years after playing Barcelona, Arsenal and Fiorentina in the Champions League of 1999–2000. Following relegation, AIK changed coach to Rikard Norling, and after a shaky start (including a shock defeat to Väsby), AIK soon were at the top of the table, promoted back into Allsvenskan, as arch rivals Djurgården won the national title.

== Squad ==
As of match played 22 October 2005

No.	Name	Nationality	Position	Date of birth (age)	Signed from	Signed in	Contract ends	Apps.	Goals
Goalkeepers
1	Daniel Örlund	(Sweden)	GK	23 June 1980 (aged 25)	Spårvägens	2002			
12	Kjell Jönsson	(Sweden)	GK	8 January 1979 (aged 26)	Café Opera	2004			
22	Nicklas Bergh	(Sweden)	GK	6 September 1982 (aged 23)	Eskilstuna City	2005		0	0
Defenders
2	Markus Karlsson	(Sweden)	DF	13 December 1979 (aged 25)	Café Opera	2005		25	0
3	Niklas Sandberg	(Sweden)	DF	3 September 1978 (aged 27)	Eskilstuna City	2004			
4	Per Karlsson	(Sweden)	DF	2 January 1986 (aged 19)	Academy	2003			
5	Kristoffer Arvhage	(Sweden)	DF	3 November 1977 (aged 27)	AaB	2005		25	0
17	Jimmy Tamandi	(Sweden)	DF	12 May 1980 (aged 25)	Potenza	2005			
18	Jonas Forsberg	(Sweden)	DF	9 March 1984 (aged 21)	Academy	2005		3	0
24	Nicklas Carlsson	(Sweden)	DF	13 November 1979 (aged 25)	AGF	2005		31	7
	Joen Averstad	(Sweden)	DF	3 November 1977 (aged 27)	Café Opera	2005			
Midfielders
6	Dennis Östlundh	(Sweden)	MF	30 August 1977 (aged 28)	Assyriska	2005			
7	Kristian Haynes	(Sweden)	MF	20 December 1980 (aged 24)	Trelleborg	2005		27	7
8	Daniel Tjernström	(Sweden)	MF	19 February 1974 (aged 31)	Örebro SK	1999			
14	Gabriel Petrović	(Sweden)	MF	25 May 1984 (aged 21)	Café Opera	2005			
15	Arash Talebinejad	(Sweden)	MF	25 March 1981 (aged 24)	Västra Frölunda	2003			
16	Mattias Moström	(Sweden)	MF	25 February 1983 (aged 22)	Café Opera	2004			
19	Robert Persson	(Sweden)	MF	13 November 1979 (aged 25)	Academy	2004			
20	Derek Boateng	(Ghana)	MF	2 May 1983 (aged 22)	Panathinaikos	2003			
23	Mats Rubarth	(Sweden)	MF	25 January 1977 (aged 28)	Örebro SK	2001			
25	Brwa Nouri	(Sweden)	MF	23 January 1987 (aged 18)	Academy	2004			
Forwards
9	Daniel Hoch	(Sweden)	FW	11 May 1979 (aged 26)	Academy	1997			
11	Göran Marklund	(Sweden)	FW	2 October 1975 (aged 30)	Café Opera	2004			
13	Fredrik Ingel	(Sweden)	FW		Academy	1999			
21	Andreas Eriksson	(Sweden)	FW	3 November 1981 (aged 23)	Café Opera	2004			
	Admir Ćatović	(Bosnia and Herzegovina)	FW	5 September 1987 (aged 18)	Academy	2005		2	1
Out on loan
Left during the season
10	Andreas Andersson	(Sweden)	FW	10 April 1974 (aged 31)	Newcastle United	1999			

== Transfers ==
=== In ===
Date	Position	Nationality	Name	From	Fee	Ref.
1 January 2005	DF	(Sweden)	Markus Karlsson	Café Opera	Undisclosed	
1 January 2005	DF	(Sweden)	Kristoffer Arvhage	AaB	Undisclosed	
1 January 2005	MF	(Sweden)	Dennis Östlundh	Assyriska	Undisclosed	
1 January 2005	MF	(Sweden)	Kristian Haynes	Trelleborg	Undisclosed	
1 January 2005	MF	(Sweden)	Gabriel Petrović	Café Opera	Undisclosed	
1 July 2005	GK	(Sweden)	Nicklas Bergh	Eskilstuna City	Undisclosed	
1 July 2005	DF	(Sweden)	Nicklas Carlsson	AGF	Undisclosed	
1 July 2005	DF	(Sweden)	Johan Mjällby	Levante	Undisclosed	
1 July 2005	DF	(Sweden)	Jimmy Tamandi	Potenza	Undisclosed	
1 July 2005	MF	(Sweden)	Joen Averstad	Café Opera	Undisclosed	

=== Released ===
Date	Position	Nationality	Name	Joined	Date	Ref
1 August 2005	FW	(Sweden)	Andreas Andersson	Retired		
31 December 2005	DF	(Sweden)	Kristoffer Arvhage	IFK Norrköping	1 January 2006	
31 December 2005	MF	(Sweden)	Gabriel Petrović	IFK Mariehamn	1 January 2006	
31 December 2005	FW	(Sweden)	Daniel Hoch	AaB	1 January 2006	
31 December 2005	FW	(Sweden)	Göran Marklund	Assyriska FF	1 January 2006	
31 December 2005	FW	(Sweden)	Fredrik Ingel			
31 December 2005	FW	(Sweden)	Andreas Eriksson	Väsby United	1 January 2006	

== Friendlies ==
7 February 2005	AIK	1–2	Enskede IK	Stockholm
18:00 CET (UTC+1)	Arvhage (yellow card) 10'; Hoch 47'	Report	Norbeck 11'; Spelare (yellow card) 50'; Hovén 54'	Stadium: Skytteholms IP; Attendance: 1,000; Referee: Stefan Johannesson

14 February 2005	AIK	3–0	Västerås SK	Stockholm
18:00 CET (UTC+1)	Haynes 13'; Talebinejad 15'; Hoch 37'; Östlundh (yellow card) 85'	Report	Curtolo (yellow card) 9' (red card) 63'; Feltendahl (yellow card) 15'; Johansson (yellow card) 55'; Svensson (yellow card) 71'	Stadium: Skytteholms IP; Attendance: 1,125; Referee: Jonas Eriksson

19 February 2005	AIK	0–1	GIF Sundsvall	Stockholm
14:00 CET (UTC+1)		Report	Andersson 45'	Stadium: Skytteholms IP; Attendance: 3,260; Referee: Lars Kratz

26 February 2005	AIK	2–4	Örebro SK	Stockholm
14:00 CET (UTC+1)	Tjernström 10'; Rubarth (yellow card) 44'; Karlsson (yellow card) 60'; Marklund 77'	Report	Costa 21'; Kuhi 56'; Larsen 69'; Anttonen 74'	Stadium: Skytteholms IP; Attendance: 1,945; Referee: Keijo Hyvärinen

9 March 2005	AIK	1–1	IFK Norrköping	Stockholm
16:30 CET (UTC+1)	Averstad (yellow card) 17'; Haynes 81'	Report	Torin (yellow card) 18'; Þórðarson (yellow card) 30'; Alm 56'	Stadium: Skytteholms IP; Attendance: 1,591

19 March 2005	AIK	0–2	Assyriska FF	Stockholm
14:00 CET (UTC+1)		Report	Goal	Stadium: Skytteholms IP; Attendance: 2,826

24 March 2005	GIF Sundsvall	–	AIK	Sundsvall
17:00 CET (UTC+1)		Report		Stadium: Okänd Arena

2 April 2005	Landskrona BoIS	0–2	AIK	Landskrona
14:00 CEST (UTC+2)		Report	Hoch 59'; Eriksson 70'	Stadium: Ulkavallen; Attendance: 1,000

9 April 2005	AIK	1–0	Inter Turku	Stockholm
15:00 CEST (UTC+2)	Corpache (yellow card) 10'; N'Gal (yellow card) 26'	Report	Sandberg (yellow card) 60'; Rubarth 61' (pen.); Haynes (yellow card) 69'	Stadium: Ulriksdals IP; Attendance: 1,200; Referee: Mattias Fällström

3 August 2005	IK Sirius	0–0	AIK	Uppsala
15:00 CEST (UTC+2)		Report	Sandberg (yellow card) 75'	Stadium: Österängens IP; Attendance: 1,604; Referee: Daniel Persson

== Competitions ==
=== Overview ===
Competition	First match	Last match	Starting round	Final position	Record							
Competition	First match	Last match	Starting round	Final position	Pld	W	D	L	GF	GA	GD	Win %
Superettan	17 April 2005	22 October 2005	Matchday 1	Winners	30	19	7	4	56	27	+29	63.33
Svenska Cupen	21 April 2005	5 May 2005	Second round	Third round	2	1	0	1	3	1	+2	50.00
Total					32	20	7	5	59	28	+31	62.50

Last updated: 22 October 2005
Source: Competitions

=== Superettan ===
==== League table ====
Pos	Team	Pld	W	D	L	GF	GA	GD	Pts	Promotion, qualification or relegation
1	AIK (C, P)	30	19	7	4	56	27	+29	64	Promotion to Allsvenskan
2	Östers IF (P)	30	17	4	9	48	36	+12	55	Promotion to Allsvenskan
3	GAIS (O, P)	30	14	10	6	52	35	+17	52	Qualification to Promotion playoffs
4	Ljungskile SK	30	13	11	6	41	29	+12	50	
5	Örebro SK	30	12	9	9	40	32	+8	45	

Source: svenskfotboll.se (in Swedish)
Rules for classification: 1) points; 2) goal difference; 3) number of goals scored.
(C) Champions; (O) Play-off winners; (P) Promoted

==== Results summary ====
Overall								Home						Away					
Pld	W	D	L	GF	GA	GD	Pts	W	D	L	GF	GA	GD	W	D	L	GF	GA	GD
30	19	7	4	56	27	+29	64	9	5	1	29	11	+18	10	2	3	27	16	+11

Last updated: 22 October 2005.
Source: Results

==== Results by matchday ====
Matchday	1	2	3	4	5	6	7	8	9	10	11	12	13	14	15	16	17	18	19	20	21	22	23	24	25	26	27	28	29	30
Ground	H	A	H	A	H	A	H	A	H	A	H	A	H	A	A	H	A	H	A	H	A	H	A	H	A	H	A	H	A	H
Result	W	L	L	W	D	D	W	W	W	W	W	W	D	W	W	D	W	W	L	W	D	W	L	W	W	D	W	D	W	W
Position																														

Updated to match(es) played on 22 October 2005. Source: Results
A = Away; H = Home; W = Win; D = Draw; L = Loss; P = Postponed

==== Results ====
17 April 2005 1	AIK	1–0	Degerfors	Stockholm
16:00 CEST (UTC+2)	Larsson 68' (o.g.); Rubarth (yellow card) 70'; Sandberg (yellow card) 73'; Hoch (yellow card) 79'	Report	Berger (yellow card) 73'	Stadium: Råsunda Stadion; Attendance: 16,858; Referee: Lars Kratz

26 April 2005 2	IFK Norrköping	2–0	AIK	Norrköping
19:00 CEST (UTC+2)	Kabous 62'; Santos (yellow card) 62'; Alm 90+1'	Report	Rubarth (yellow card) 24'	Stadium: Norrköpings Idrottspark; Attendance: 14,373; Referee: Håkan Johansson

1 May 2005 3	AIK	1–2	Väsby United	Stockholm
16:00 CEST (UTC+2)	Östlundh 39'; Carlsson (yellow card) 80'	Report	Hejazi 75', 90+2'; Holm (yellow card) 80'	Stadium: Råsunda Stadion; Attendance: 10,648; Referee: Keijo Hyvärinen

11 May 2005 4	IF Brommapojkarna	1–2	AIK	Stockholm
19:05 CEST (UTC+2)	Ekström 45'	Report	Östlundh 8'; Carlsson (yellow card) 27'; Haynes 74'	Stadium: Stockholms stadion Attendance: 5,491; Referee: Johnny Lundbäck

15 May 2005 5	AIK	1–1	Ljungskile	Stockholm
16:10 CEST (UTC+2)	Leinar 52' (o.g.); Rubarth (yellow card) 85'	Report	Leinar 44'; Patriksson (yellow card) 47'	Stadium: Råsunda Stadion; Attendance: 8,259; Referee: Andréas Kovács

22 May 2005 6	Mjällby AIF	1–1	AIK	Hällevik
17:00 CEST (UTC+2)	Olsson 12'; Ekenberg (yellow card) 62'; Jonasson (yellow card) 68'; Lindberg (yellow card) 90+3'	Report	Moström (yellow card) 49'; Hoch (yellow card) 75' (yellow-red card) 90+4', (goal) 89'; Boateng (yellow card) 90'; Haynes (yellow card) 90+3'	Stadium: Strandvallen; Attendance: 4,581; Referee: Keijo Hyvärinen

25 May 2005 7	AIK	3–1	Bodens BK	Stockholm
18:30 CEST (UTC+2)	Östlundh 17'; Andersson 31'; Rubarth 78'	Report	Ingel (yellow card) 14'; Brännström 34'	Stadium: Råsunda Stadion; Attendance: 7,031; Referee: Håkan Bergerson

29 May 2005 8	Örebro SK	0–5	AIK	Örebro
16:00 CEST (UTC+2)	Jelecak (yellow card) 11'; Haginge (yellow card) 72'	Report	Östlundh (yellow card) 7', (goal) 48', 69'; Hoch 17'; Tjernström 40'; M.Karlsson (yellow card) 62'; Marklund 76'	Stadium: Behrn Arena; Attendance: 6,604; Referee: Lars Kratz

9 June 2005 9	AIK	1–0	Åtvidaberg	Stockholm
19:00 CEST (UTC+2)	Carlsson 29'; M.Karlsson (yellow card) 49'	Report	Chhadeh (yellow card) 31'; Bapupa (yellow card) 67'	Stadium: Råsunda Stadion; Attendance: 10,716; Referee: Andréas Kovács

13 June 2005 10	GAIS	0–3	AIK	Gothenburg
19:00 CEST (UTC+2)	Figueiredo (yellow card) 34'; Elmander (yellow card) 76'; Heed (yellow card) 85'	Report	Rubarth 12'; Haynes 17'; Andersson 36'; Sandberg (yellow card) 55'; Moström (yellow card) 69'	Stadium: Gamla Ullevi; Attendance: 8,962; Referee: Per-Anders Andersson

19 June 2005 11	AIK	5–0	Västerås SK	Stockholm
17:00 CEST (UTC+2)	Eriksson 9', 60'; Talebinejad 38', 73'; Östlundh (yellow card) 56'; Hoch 88'	Report	Andersson (yellow card) 59'; Ljevar (yellow card) 87'	Stadium: Råsunda Stadion; Attendance: 11,451; Referee: Lars-Göran Johansson

22 June 2005 12	Falkenberg	0–1	AIK	Falkenberg
19:00 CEST (UTC+2)	Sandquist (yellow card) 26'; Svensson (yellow card) 32'; Persson (yellow card) 47'	Report	Rubarth 49'; Hoch (yellow card) 50'; Arvhage (yellow card) 90+3'	Stadium: Falkenbergs IP; Attendance: 4,451; Referee: Miro Ukalovic

27 June 2005 13	AIK	1–1	Östers IF	Stockholm
19:00 CEST (UTC+2)	Arvhage (yellow card) 17'; Rubarth 49'; Boateng (yellow card) 90'	Report	Bild (yellow card) 10'; Nouri (yellow card) 44'; Cederqvist 61'	Stadium: Råsunda Stadion; Attendance: 13,429; Referee: Johnny Lundbäck

5 July 2005 14	Västra Frölunda	0–3	AIK	Gothenburg
19:00 CEST (UTC+2)	Ottordahl (yellow card) 6'; Friberg (yellow card) 42'	Report	Marklund 53'; Talebinejad 75'; Åhman Persson 90+2'	Stadium: Ruddalens IP; Attendance: 2,112; Referee: Michael Lerjéus

10 July 2005 15	Trelleborgs FF	2–3	AIK	Trelleborg
17:00 CEST (UTC+2)	Persson (yellow card) 19'; Redo 42'; Bengtsson (yellow card) 80'; Jusufi 90'	Report	Talebinejad 10'; Carlsson (yellow card) 25'; Moström 56', 74'; Örlund (yellow card) 77'	Stadium: Vångavallen; Attendance: 3,016; Referee: Per-Anders Andersson

16 July 2005 16	AIK	0–0	Trelleborgs FF	Stockholm
16:00 CEST (UTC+2)	M.Karlsson (yellow card) 72'	Report	Ademolu (yellow card) 42'; Bjurström (yellow card) 59'; Skiljo (yellow card) 69'	Stadium: Råsunda Stadion; Attendance: 11,408; Referee: Peter Magnusson

21 July 2005 17	Degerfors	0–1	AIK	Degerfors
19:00 CEST (UTC+2)		Report	Tjernström 20'; Östlundh (yellow card) 74'; Rubarth (yellow card) 80'; Åhman Persson (yellow card) 90+2'	Stadium: Stora Valla; Attendance: 6,519; Referee: Keijo Hyvärinen

8 August 2005 18	AIK	2–0	IFK Norrköping	Stockholm
19:00 CEST (UTC+2)	Boateng 19' (yellow card) 25'; Carlsson 37'; Örlund (red card) 52'	Report	Rönneklev (yellow card) 6'; Thordarson (yellow card) 21'	Stadium: Råsunda Stadion; Attendance: 18,818; Referee: Keijo Hyvärinen

15 August 2005 19	Väsby United	2–1	AIK	Stockholm
19:00 CEST (UTC+2)	Kanga 4' (yellow card) 89'; Sundin 12' (yellow card) 34'	Report	Talebinejad 20'; Tjernström (yellow card) 89'	Stadium: Råsunda Stadion; Attendance: 8,672; Referee: Keijo Hyvärinen

20 August 2005 20	AIK	1–0	IF Brommapojkarna	Stockholm
16:00 CEST (UTC+2)	Carlsson (yellow card) 22'; Boateng (yellow card) 60'; Talebinejad 90'	Report	Lagerlöf (yellow card) 88'	Stadium: Råsunda Stadion; Attendance: 9,436; Referee: Per-Anders Andersson

24 August 2005 21	Ljungskile	1–1	AIK	Ljungskile
19:00 CEST (UTC+2)	Pavey (yellow card) 60'; Augustsson (yellow card) 84'; Wålemark 90+1'	Report	Rubarth (yellow card) 54'; Haynes 70'	Stadium: Skarsjövallen; Attendance: 3,141; Referee: Peter Stefansson

28 August 2005 22	AIK	3–1	Mjällby AIF	Stockholm
17:00 CEST (UTC+2)	Carlsson 16'; Haynes 22'; Sandberg (yellow card) 53'; Rubarth (yellow card) 59'; Östlundh 81'	Report	Ekenberg 54' (yellow card) 55'; Hiir-Salakka (yellow card) 66'	Stadium: Råsunda Stadion; Attendance: 9,546; Referee: Åke Andreasson

4 September 2005 23	Bodens BK	5–1	AIK	Boden
CEST (UTC+2)	Simba 5'; Ingel 8'; Gitselov (yellow card) 35' (goal) 81'; Brännström 40'; Kuhi 67'	Report	Moström (yellow card) 30'; Tjernström 60'	Stadium: Björknäsvallen; Attendance: 6,459; Referee: Zarko Kovacevic

13 September 2005 24	AIK	3–1	Örebro SK	Stockholm
19:00 CEST (UTC+2)	Haynes 15'; Rubarth 25'; Tamandi (yellow card) 43'; Carlsson 60'	Report	Anttonen 47'	Stadium: Råsunda Stadion; Attendance: 11,413; Referee: Markus Strömbergsson

21 September 2005 25	Åtvidaberg	0–1	AIK	Åtvidaberg
19:05 CEST (UTC+2)	Lundqvist (yellow card) 40'; C.Karlsson (yellow card) 75'	Report	Haynes 37'; Östlundh (yellow card) 81'	Stadium: Kopparvallen; Attendance: 4,624; Referee: Sven-Martin Åkesson

25 September 2005 26	AIK	3–3	GAIS	Stockholm
16:10 CEST (UTC+2)	Talebinejad 46'; Tjernström 58'; Haynes (yellow card) 71'; Carlsson 88'	Report	Östberg (yellow card) 3' (goal) 90+1'; Blomgren 51' (yellow card) 71'; Figueiredo 52'; Heed (yellow card) 53'	Stadium: Råsunda Stadion; Attendance: 23,460; Referee: Johnny Lundbäck

3 October 2005 27	Västerås SK	1–2	AIK	Västerås
19:10 CEST (UTC+2)	Markstedt 18' (yellow card) 29'; Kelly (yellow card) 40'	Report	Carlsson 23', 71'; Sandberg (yellow card) 29'; Rubarth (yellow card) 35'	Stadium: Arosvallen; Attendance: 10,023; Referee: Markus Strömbergsson

7 October 2005 28	AIK	1–1	Falkenberg	Stockholm
19:00 CEST (UTC+2)	Östlundh 20'; Moström (yellow card) 55'	Report	Claesson (yellow card) 12' (yellow-red card) 70'; Elm 18'; Backlund (yellow card) 61'	Stadium: Råsunda Stadion; Attendance: 8,408; Referee: Sven-Martin Åkesson

15 October 2005 29	Östers IF	1–2	AIK	Växjö
14:00 CEST (UTC+2)	Bild 57'; Da-Silva (yellow card) 90+1'	Report	M.Karlsson (yellow card) 6'; Tjernström 27'; Moström (yellow card) 54'; Eriksson (yellow card) 74' (goal) 79'; Boateng (yellow card) 84'	Stadium: Värendsvallen; Attendance: 7,067; Referee: Håkan Jonasson

22 October 2005 30	AIK	3–0	Västra Frölunda	Stockholm
14:00 CEST (UTC+2)	Catovic 9'; Östlundh 62'; Sandberg (yellow card) 67'; Rubarth (yellow card) 70'; Åhman Persson 89'	Report	Andersson (yellow card) 12'; Ali Khan (yellow card) 85'	Stadium: Råsunda Stadion; Attendance: 7,201; Referee: Leif Sundell

=== Svenska Cupen ===
21 April 2005 Second Round	Carlstad United	0–3	AIK	Karlstad
19:00 CEST (UTC+2)	Stefansson (yellow card) 13'; Löfgren (yellow card) 26'	Report	Östlundh 48'; Haynes 53'; Talebinejad 57'; Sandberg (yellow card) 64'; Karlsson (yellow card) 71'	Stadium: Tingvalla IP; Attendance: 730; Referee: Michael Lerjéus

5 May 2005 Third Round	Trelleborg	1–0	AIK	Trelleborg
14:30 CEST (UTC+2)	Ahlström (yellow card) 39'; Persson 82'	Report	Boateng (yellow card) 53'	Stadium: Vångavallen; Attendance: 1,121; Referee: Miro Ukalovic

== Squad statistics ==
As of match played 22 October 2005

=== Appearances and goals ===
No.	Pos	Nat	Player	Total		Superettan		Svenska Cupen	
No.	Pos	Nat	Player	Apps	Goals	Apps	Goals	Apps	Goals
1	GK	(Sweden) SWE	Daniel Örlund	30	0	29	0	1	0
2	DF	(Sweden) SWE	Markus Karlsson	25	0	20+3	0	2	0
3	DF	(Sweden) SWE	Niklas Sandberg	27	0	26	0	1	0
4	DF	(Sweden) SWE	Per Karlsson	4	0	3	0	1	0
5	DF	(Sweden) SWE	Kristoffer Arvhage	25	0	20+4	0	1	0
6	MF	(Sweden) SWE	Dennis Östlundh	31	9	27+2	8	2	1
7	MF	(Sweden) SWE	Kristian Haynes	27	7	21+4	6	1+1	1
8	MF	(Sweden) SWE	Daniel Tjernström	29	5	29	5	0	0
9	FW	(Sweden) SWE	Daniel Hoch	23	3	12+10	3	1	0
11	FW	(Sweden) SWE	Göran Marklund	15	2	7+7	2	0+1	0
12	GK	(Sweden) SWE	Kjell Jönsson	3	0	1+1	0	1	0
13	FW	(Sweden) SWE	Fredrik Ingel	1	0	0	0	0+1	0
14	MF	(Sweden) SWE	Gabriel Petrović	16	0	5+9	0	2	0
15	MF	(Sweden) SWE	Arash Talebinejad	28	8	20+6	7	1+1	1
16	MF	(Sweden) SWE	Mattias Moström	28	2	22+5	2	1	0
17	DF	(Sweden) SWE	Jimmy Tamandi	7	0	5+2	0	0	0
18	DF	(Sweden) SWE	Jonas Forsberg	3	0	1+1	0	1	0
19	MF	(Sweden) SWE	Robert Persson	7	2	3+3	2	1	0
20	MF	(Ghana) GHA	Derek Boateng	23	1	12+10	1	1	0
21	FW	(Sweden) SWE	Andreas Eriksson	19	3	11+6	3	2	0
23	MF	(Sweden) SWE	Mats Rubarth	27	5	21+6	5	0	0
24	DF	(Sweden) SWE	Nicklas Carlsson	31	7	29	7	2	0
25	FW	(Sweden) SWE	Brwa Nouri	3	0	2+1	0	0	0
	FW	(Bosnia and Herzegovina) BIH	Admir Ćatović	2	1	1+1	1	0	0
Players away on loan:
Players who appeared for AIK but left during the season:
10	FW	(Sweden) SWE	Andreas Andersson	6	2	3+3	2	0	0

=== Goal scorers ===
Place	Position	Nation	Number	Name	Superettan	Svenska Cupen	Total
1	MF	(Sweden)	6	Dennis Östlundh	8	1	9
2	MF	(Sweden)	15	Arash Talebinejad	7	1	8
3	DF	(Sweden)	24	Nicklas Carlsson	7	0	7
3	MF	(Sweden)	7	Kristian Haynes	6	1	7
5	MF	(Sweden)	23	Mats Rubarth	5	0	5
5	MF	(Sweden)	8	Daniel Tjernström	5	0	5
7	FW	(Sweden)	9	Daniel Hoch	3	0	3
7	FW	(Sweden)	21	Andreas Eriksson	3	0	3
9	FW	(Sweden)	10	Andreas Andersson	2	0	2
9	FW	(Sweden)	11	Göran Marklund	2	0	2
9	MF	(Sweden)	16	Mattias Moström	2	0	2
9	DF	(Sweden)	19	Robert Persson	2	0	2
9				Own goal	2	0	2
14	MF	(Ghana)	20	Derek Boateng	1	0	1
14	FW	(Bosnia and Herzegovina)		Admir Ćatović	1	0	1
TOTALS					56	3	59

=== Clean sheets ===
Place	Position	Nation	Number	Name	Superettan	Svenska Cupen	Total
1	GK	(Sweden)	1	Daniel Örlund	13	0	13
2	GK	(Sweden)	12	Kjell Jönsson	0	1	1
TOTALS					13	1	14

=== Disciplinary record ===
Number	Nation	Position	Name	Superettan		Svenska Cupen		Total	
Number	Nation	Position	Name	Booked	Sent off (straight red)	Booked	Sent off (straight red)	Booked	Sent off (straight red)
1	(Sweden)	GK	Daniel Örlund	1	1	0	0	1	1
2	(Sweden)	DF	Markus Karlsson	4	0	0	0	4	0
3	(Sweden)	DF	Niklas Sandberg	5	0	1	0	6	0
4	(Sweden)	DF	Per Karlsson	0	0	1	0	1	0
5	(Sweden)	DF	Kristoffer Arvhage	2	0	0	0	2	0
6	(Sweden)	MF	Dennis Östlundh	4	0	0	0	4	0
7	(Sweden)	MF	Kristian Haynes	2	0	0	0	2	0
8	(Sweden)	MF	Daniel Tjernström	1	0	0	0	1	0
9	(Sweden)	FW	Daniel Hoch	4	1	0	0	4	1
16	(Sweden)	MF	Mattias Moström	5	0	0	0	5	0
17	(Sweden)	DF	Jimmy Tamandi	1	0	0	0	1	0
19	(Sweden)	MF	Robert Persson	1	0	0	0	1	0
20	(Ghana)	MF	Derek Boateng	5	0	1	0	6	0
21	(Sweden)	FW	Andreas Eriksson	1	0	0	0	1	0
23	(Sweden)	MF	Mats Rubarth	8	0	0	0	8	0
24	(Sweden)	DF	Nicklas Carlsson	5	0	0	0	5	0
Players away on loan:
Players who left AIK during the season:
Total				50	2	3	0	53	2
