= 2006 AIK Fotboll season =

AIK
2006 season
- Manager: Rikard Norling
- Stadium: Råsunda Stadium
- Allsvenskan: 2nd
- Svenska Cupen: Third Round vs Kalmar
- Top goalscorer: League: Wílton Figueiredo (11); All: Wílton Figueiredo (11)
- Highest home attendance: 34,174 vs Djurgården (27 April 2006)
- Lowest home attendance: 2,715 vs Hudiksvalls (20 April 2006)
- Average home league attendance: 21,434 (Allsvenskan - 5 November 2006); 20,097 (All competitions - 5 November 2006)

AIK returned to the top flight in emphatic fashion, finishing just one point adrift of champions Elfsborg. Led by unproven coach Rikard Norling, the club has resurged quickly since the 2004 relegation, winning Superettan, and then coming close to winning the top flight-title. Superettan signings Wílton Figueiredo and Markus Jonsson quickly adjusted to Allsvenskan, both being key men in the title chase.

== Squad ==
As of match played 5 November 2006

No.	Name	Nationality	Position	Date of birth (age)	Signed from	Signed in	Contract ends	Apps.	Goals
Goalkeepers
1	Daniel Örlund	(Sweden)	GK	23 June 1980 (aged 26)	Spårvägens	2002			
12	Kjell Jönsson	(Sweden)	GK	8 January 1979 (aged 27)	Café Opera	2004			
22	Nicklas Bergh	(Sweden)	GK	6 September 1982 (aged 24)	Eskilstuna City	2005		2	0
Defenders
2	Markus Karlsson	(Sweden)	DF	13 December 1979 (aged 26)	Café Opera	2005		34	0
3	Niklas Sandberg	(Sweden)	DF	3 September 1978 (aged 28)	Eskilstuna City	2004			
13	Daniel Arnefjord	(Sweden)	DF	21 March 1979 (aged 27)	Väsby United	2006		19	0
17	Jimmy Tamandi	(Sweden)	DF	12 May 1980 (aged 26)	Potenza	2005			
18	Markus Jonsson	(Sweden)	DF	9 March 1981 (aged 25)	Öster	2006		25	8
24	Nicklas Carlsson	(Sweden)	DF	13 November 1979 (aged 26)	AGF	2005		54	10
27	Marcio Saraiva	(Brazil)	DF	20 June 1981 (aged 25)	Mirassol	2006		5	0
	Matti Kilpelä	(Finland)	DF	22 April 1980 (aged 26)	RoPS	2006		0	0
Midfielders
6	Dennis Östlundh	(Sweden)	MF	30 August 1977 (aged 29)	Assyriska	2005			
7	Kristian Haynes	(Sweden)	MF	20 December 1980 (aged 25)	Trelleborg	2005		37	9
8	Daniel Tjernström	(Sweden)	MF	19 February 1974 (aged 32)	Örebro SK	1999			
14	Kenny Pavey	(England)	MF	23 August 1979 (aged 27)	Ljungskile	2006		20	3
16	Mattias Moström	(Sweden)	MF	25 February 1983 (aged 23)	Café Opera	2004			
19	Robert Persson	(Sweden)	MF	13 November 1979 (aged 26)	Academy	2004			
23	Mats Rubarth	(Sweden)	MF	25 January 1977 (aged 29)	Örebro SK	2001			
28	Pierre Bengtsson	(Sweden)	MF	12 April 1988 (aged 18)	Academy	2006		4	0
29	Gabriel Özkan	(Sweden)	MF	23 May 1986 (aged 20)	IF Brommapojkarna	2006		10	2
30	Dulee Johnson	(Liberia)	MF	7 November 1984 (aged 21)	BK Häcken	2006		28	0
	Magnus Eriksson	(Sweden)	MF	8 April 1990 (aged 16)	Academy	2006		0	0
Forwards
9	Miran Burgić	(Slovenia)	FW	25 September 1984 (aged 22)	Gorica	2006		13	5
10	Wílton Figueiredo	(Brazil)	FW	17 March 1982 (aged 24)	GAIS	2006		27	11
11	Bernt Hulsker	(Norway)	FW	9 September 1977 (aged 29)	Vålerenga	2006		18	3
15	Admir Ćatović	(Bosnia and Herzegovina)	FW	5 September 1987 (aged 19)	Academy	2005		4	1
26	Daniel Mendes	(Brazil)	FW	18 January 1981 (aged 25)	Degerfors	2006		14	4
Out on loan
4	Per Karlsson	(Sweden)	DF	2 January 1986 (aged 20)	Academy	2003			
25	Brwa Nouri	(Sweden)	MF	23 January 1987 (aged 19)	Academy	2004			
Left during the season
5	Johan Mjällby	(Sweden)	DF	9 February 1971 (aged 35)	Levante	2006		186	10
18	Jonas Forsberg	(Sweden)	DF	9 March 1984 (aged 22)	Academy	2005		3	0
20	Derek Boateng	(Ghana)	MF	2 May 1983 (aged 23)	Panathinaikos	2003			
21	Robert Johansson	(Sweden)	DF	29 March 1980 (aged 26)		2006		1	0
26	Nenad Lukić	(Serbia)	FW	26 September 1975 (aged 31)		2006		4	0

== Transfers ==
=== In ===
Date	Position	Nationality	Name	From	Fee	Ref.
1 January 2006	DF	(Sweden)	Daniel Arnefjord	Väsby United	Undisclosed	
1 January 2006	DF	(Sweden)	Robert Johansson	Ljungskile	Undisclosed	
1 January 2006	DF	(Sweden)	Markus Jonsson	Östers IF	Undisclosed	
1 January 2006	MF	(England)	Kenny Pavey	Ljungskile	Undisclosed	
1 January 2006	FW	(Brazil)	Wílton Figueiredo	GAIS	Undisclosed	
1 January 2006	FW	(Norway)	Bernt Hulsker	Vålerenga	Undisclosed	
20 February 2006	MF	(Liberia)	Dulee Johnson	BK Häcken	Undisclosed	
1 July 2006	MF	(Sweden)	Gabriel Özkan	IF Brommapojkarna	Undisclosed	
1 July 2006	FW	(Brazil)	Daniel Mendes	Degerfors	Undisclosed	
1 July 2006	FW	(Slovenia)	Miran Burgić	Gorica	Undisclosed	

=== Out ===
Date	Position	Nationality	Name	To	Fee	Ref.
1 February 2006	MF	(Sweden)	Arash Talebinejad	Tromsø	Undisclosed	
1 March 2006	DF	(Sweden)	Joen Averstad	Enköpings SK	Undisclosed	
1 July 2006	DF	(Sweden)	Jonas Forsberg	Umeå	Undisclosed	
1 July 2006	DF	(Sweden)	Robert Johansson	Ljungskile	Undisclosed	
1 July 2006	MF	(Ghana)	Derek Boateng	Beitar Jerusalem	Undisclosed	
1 July 2006	FW	(Serbia)	Nenad Lukić	Vasalund	Undisclosed	
1 December 2006	DF	(Brazil)	Marcio Saraiva	Resende	Undisclosed	
1 December 2006	DF	(Sweden)	Markus Karlsson	Degerfors	Undisclosed	
1 December 2006	MF	(Sweden)	Mattias Moström	Molde	Undisclosed	

=== Loans out ===
Start date	Position	Nationality	Name	To	End date	Ref.
1 March 2006	DF	(Sweden)	Per Karlsson	Väsby United	31 December 2006	
1 July 2006	MF	(Sweden)	Brwa Nouri	Åtvidaberg	1 December 2006	

=== Released ===
Date	Position	Nationality	Name	Joined	Date	Ref
16 May 2006	DF	(Sweden)	Johan Mjällby	Retired		
31 December 2006	GK	(Sweden)	Kjell Jönsson	Västra Frölunda	1 January 2007	
31 December 2006	DF	(Finland)	Matti Kilpelä	Skellefteå FF	1 January 2007	
31 December 2006	FW	(Bosnia and Herzegovina)	Admir Ćatović	AFC Eskilstuna	1 January 2007	

=== Trial ===
Date from	Position	Nationality	Name	Last club	Date to	Ref
Winter 2006	FW	(Latvia)	Gatis Kalniņš	Skonto Riga		

== Friendlies ==
14 February 2006	Nyköpings BIS	0–3	AIK	Nyköping
17:00 CET (UTC+1)	(yellow card) 49'; (yellow card) 56'	Report	Haynes 20'; Lukić 59', 78'; Persson (yellow card) 80'	Stadium: Rosvalla IP; Attendance: 500; Referee: Per Brännberg

18 February 2006	AIK	2–1	IF Brommapojkarna	Stockholm
14:00 CET (UTC+1)	Haynes 60'; Pavey 84'; Rubarth (yellow card) 87'	Report	Guterstam (yellow card) 33'; Youssef (yellow card) 35'; Ekström 59'	Stadium: Skytteholms IP; Attendance: 3,426; Referee: Stefan Johannesson

25 February 2006	AIK	1–1	Assyriska FF	Stockholm
14:00 CET (UTC+1)	Boateng (yellow card) 23'; Hulsker 33'	Report	Sundin 38'; Bulun (yellow card) 70'	Stadium: Skytteholms IP; Attendance: 2,967; Referee: Jonas Eriksson

28 February 2006	AIK	8–0	Vallentuna	Stockholm
16:30 CET (UTC+1)	Lukić 11', 20' (pen.); Haynes 19'; Jonsson 34', 87'; Östlundh 49'; Ćatović 80'; Johnson 90'	Report	Ring (yellow card) 40'	Stadium: Skytteholms IP; Attendance: 920; Referee: Patrik Malmberg

4 March 2006	AIK	1–2	Degerfors	Stockholm
14:00 CET (UTC+1)	Persson (yellow card) 39'; Carlsson (yellow card) 54'; Haynes 57' (yellow card) 85'; Östlundh (yellow card) 78'; Arnefjord (yellow card) 88'	Report	Mendes 14'; Hedberg 17'; Solberg (yellow card) 20'; Lindskog (yellow card) 42' (yellow-red card) 81'; Rodrigues (yellow card) 45'; Lamøy (yellow card) 60'	Stadium: Skytteholms IP; Attendance: 1,680; Referee: Stefan Johannesson

8 March 2006	AIK	2–3	GIF Sundsvall	Stockholm
16:00 CET (UTC+1)	Hulsker (yellow card) 7'; Pavey 29'; Figueiredo (yellow card) 44'; Johnson 47'; Kalniņš (yellow card) 78'	Report	Cleaver (yellow card) 3' (goal) 8' (pen.); Dahlberg 56'; Hermansson (yellow card) 60' (yellow-red card) 90+2'; Lustig 67'; Bayat (yellow card) 78'	Stadium: Skytteholms IP; Attendance: 1,206; Referee: Lars Kratz

16 March 2006	SCU Torreense	1–2	AIK	Torres Vedras
16:00 CET (UTC+1)	Afonso (yellow card) 45+1'; Pina 48' (pen.); Hiroshi (yellow card) 84'	Report	Hulsker 18' (yellow card) 18'; Rubarth (yellow card) 47'; 69' (o.g.)	Stadium: Estádio Manuel Marques; Attendance: 11

25 March 2006	AIK	3–1	TPS	Stockholm
14:00 CET (UTC+1)	Hulsker 24' (pen.), 73'; Johnson (yellow card) 55'; Lukić 90+1'	Report	Hämäläinen (yellow card) 23'; Heinikangas (yellow card) 32'; Surraco 39'; Rähmönen (yellow card) 54'	Stadium: Skytteholms IP; Attendance: 2,123; Referee: Markus Strömbergsson

3 April 2006	AIK	6–0	Enköpings SK	Stockholm
18:00 CEST (UTC+2)	Figueiredo 8', 59'; Lukić 33', 37', 67', 78'	Report		Stadium: Skytteholms IP; Attendance: 150

27 May 2006	Östers IF	0–0	AIK	Märsta
15:00 CEST (UTC+2)		Report	Arnefjord (yellow card) 9'	Stadium: Midgårdsvallen; Attendance: 700

1 July 2006	Gefle IF	1–0	AIK	Norrtälje
13:00 CEST (UTC+2)	Mattsson 58'	Report	Arnefjord (yellow card) 44'; Bengtsson (yellow card) 88'	Stadium: Norrtälje IP; Attendance: 1,020

8 July 2006	Brøndby	1–2	AIK	Brøndbyvester
16:00 CEST (UTC+2)	M.Rasmussen 42' (yellow card) 60'; Spelmann (yellow card) 68'	Report	Figueiredo 17'; Moström 70'	Stadium: Brøndby Stadium; Attendance: 2,040; Referee: Anders Hermansen

=== Royal League ===
12 November 2006 1	IF Elfsborg	4–0	AIK	Borås
13:30 CET (UTC+1)	Avdić 25', 52'; Andersson 54'; Holmén 84'	Report		Stadium: Borås Arena; Attendance: 3,375; Referee: Claus Bo Larsen

26 November 2006 2	AIK	1–1	Vålerenga	Stockholm
16:00 CET (UTC+1)	Rubarth (yellow card) 43'; Arnefjord (yellow card) 50'; Figueiredo 57'; Hulsker (red card) 75'	Report	Sørensen 79'; Flo (yellow card) 88'	Stadium: Råsunda Stadion; Attendance: 4,512; Referee: Emil Laursen

30 November 2006 3	AIK	1–1	Viborg FF	Stockholm
19:00 CET (UTC+1)	Figueiredo 7'	Report	Åslund (yellow card) 39'; Kryger 80'; Frandsen (yellow card) 90+2'	Stadium: Råsunda Stadion; Attendance: 3,453; Referee: Tommy Skjerven

3 December 2006 4	Vålerenga	4–2	AIK	Oslo
16:00 CET (UTC+1)	Mathisen 9'; Wæhler 53'; Sørensen 55', 60'	Report	Burgić 15' (yellow card) 58'; Arnefjord (yellow card) 37'; Rubarth 71' (yellow card) 80'	Stadium: Bislett Stadium; Attendance: 3,269; Referee: Mikael Svendsen

7 December 2006 5	AIK	1–1	IF Elfsborg	Stockholm
19:00 CET (UTC+1)	Rubarth (yellow card) 43' (goal) 57'; Moström (yellow card) 76'; Persson (yellow card) 86'; Johnson (yellow card) 86'; Sandberg (yellow card) 89'	Report	Svensson (yellow card) 64'; Alexandersson 87'	Stadium: Råsunda Stadion; Attendance: 6,221; Referee: Emil Laursen

10 December 2006 6	Viborg FF	1–2	AIK	Viborg
15:00 CET (UTC+1)	Tengstedt (yellow card) 39' (goal) 80'; Russell (yellow card) 52'; Poulsen (yellow card) 87'	Report	Mendes 8'; Hulsker 50'; Figueiredo (yellow card) 87'; Arnefjord (yellow card) 90+5'	Stadium: Viborg Stadium; Attendance: 2,757; Referee: Tom Henning Øvrebø

== Competitions ==
=== Overview ===
Competition	First match	Last match	Starting round	Final position	Record							
Competition	First match	Last match	Starting round	Final position	Pld	W	D	L	GF	GA	GD	Win %
Allsvenskan	2 April 2006	5 November 2006	Matchday 1	Runners-up	26	13	10	3	46	23	+23	50.00
Svenska Cupen	20 April 2006	7 June 2005	Second round	Third round	2	1	0	1	5	4	+1	50.00
Total					28	14	10	4	51	27	+24	50.00

Last updated: 5 November 2006
Source: Competitions

=== Allsvenskan ===
==== League table ====
Pos	Team	Pld	W	D	L	GF	GA	GD	Pts	Qualification or relegation
1	IF Elfsborg (C)	26	13	11	2	41	19	+22	50	Qualification to Champions League first qualifying round
2	AIK	26	13	10	3	46	23	+23	49	Qualification to UEFA Cup first qualifying round
3	Hammarby IF (Note: Hammarby were docked three points for a tumult in their home game against Djurgården on August 28, 2006.)	26	13	7	6	40	31	+9	43	Qualification to Intertoto Cup first round
4	Helsingborgs IF	26	11	9	6	44	34	+10	42	Qualification to UEFA Cup first qualifying round (Note: Helsingborg qualified for the UEFA Cup as Svenska Cupen champions 2006.)
5	Kalmar FF	26	12	5	9	39	30	+9	41	

Source: svenskfotboll.se (in Swedish)
Rules for classification: 1) points; 2) goal difference; 3) number of goals scored.
(C) Champions

==== Results summary ====
Overall								Home						Away					
Pld	W	D	L	GF	GA	GD	Pts	W	D	L	GF	GA	GD	W	D	L	GF	GA	GD
26	13	10	3	46	23	+23	49	9	3	1	30	11	+19	4	7	2	16	12	+4

Last updated: 5 November 2006.
Source: Results

==== Results by matchday ====
Matchday	1	2	3	4	5	6	7	8	9	10	11	12	13	14	15	16	17	18	19	20	21	22	23	24	25	26
Ground	H	A	H	A	H	A	H	A	H	A	H	A	H	A	A	H	A	H	A	H	A	H	A	H	A	H
Result	D	W	W	D	W	L	D	W	W	L	W	D	W	W	D	W	D	W	W	L	D	D	D	W	D	W
Position																										

Updated to match(es) played on 5 November 2006. Source: Results
A = Away; H = Home; W = Win; D = Draw; L = Loss; P = Postponed

==== Results ====
2 April 2006 1	AIK	2–2	Gefle	Stockholm
15:00 CEST (UTC+2)	Rubarth (yellow card) 22'; Jonsson 31' (pen.); Hulsker 49'; Boateng (yellow card) 72'	Report	Ytterbom 16'; Viikmäe 61'; Makondele (yellow card) 73'; Bernhardsson (yellow card) 87'	Stadium: Råsunda Stadion; Attendance: 23,822; Referee: Daniel Stålhammar

10 April 2006 2	Öster	0–4	AIK	Växjö
19:00 CEST (UTC+2)	Borg (yellow card) 55'; Daníelsson (yellow card) 56'; Cederqvist (yellow card) 66'	Report	Figueiredo 4'; Carlsson 34' (yellow card) 70'; Hulsker (yellow card) 51'; Pavey 53'; Jonsson 90' (pen.)	Stadium: Värendsvallen; Attendance: 7,896; Referee: Sven-Martin Åkesson

17 April 2006 3	AIK	2–1	Örgryte	Stockholm
15:00 CEST (UTC+2)	Figueiredo 11'; Sandberg 77'; Hulsker (yellow card) 90' (red card) 90+4'	Report	Skiljo (yellow card) 26'; Prytz (yellow card) 32'; Anegrund 38'; Dahlin (yellow card) 57'; Uusimäki (yellow card) 73'; Valter (yellow card) 75'	Stadium: Råsunda Stadion; Attendance: 16,446; Referee: Håkan Jonasson

24 April 2006 4	Helsingborg	1–1	AIK	Helsingborg
19:00 CEST (UTC+2)	Dahl (yellow card) 20'; Mariga (yellow card) 51'; Stefanidis 81'	Report	Figueiredo 25'; Boateng (yellow card) 40'; M.Karlsson (yellow card) 76'	Stadium: Olympia; Attendance: 11,148; Referee: Miro Ukalovic

27 April 2006 5	AIK	3–1	Djurgården	Stockholm
20:00 CEST (UTC+2)	Jonsson 35' (pen.); Boateng 54'; Rubarth (yellow card) 56' (yellow-red card) 80'; Haynes 90'	Report	Magro (yellow card) 11'; Bergtoft (yellow card) 70'; Hysén 90'	Stadium: Råsunda Stadion; Attendance: 34,174; Referee: Martin Ingvarsson

3 May 2006 6	Hammarby	2–0	AIK	Stockholm
20:00 CEST (UTC+2)	Jensen 32'; Gunnarsson (yellow card) 66'; Andersson (yellow card) 72'; Paulinho 89'	Report	Pavey (yellow card) 10'; Carlsson (yellow card) 71'	Stadium: Söderstadion; Attendance: 14,694; Referee: Peter Fröjdfeldt

8 May 2006 7	AIK	2–2	Elfsborg	Stockholm
19:00 CEST (UTC+2)	Tjernström (yellow card) 64'; Jonsson 75' (pen.); Figueiredo 84'; Pavey (yellow card) 90+4'	Report	Ishizaki (yellow card) 31'; Strömberg (yellow card) 45'; A.Svensson 90'; Alexandersson 90'	Stadium: Råsunda Stadion; Attendance: 17,870; Referee: Martin Ingvarsson

11 May 2006 8	Häcken	0–1	AIK	Gothenburg
19:00 CEST (UTC+2)	Dixon (yellow card) 19'; Williams (yellow card) 63'; Berggren (yellow card) 90+1'	Report	Figueiredo 6'; Tamandi (yellow card) 42'	Stadium: Rambergsvallen; Attendance: 2,346; Referee: Sven-Martin Åkesson

14 May 2006 9	AIK	2–0	GAIS	Stockholm
17:00 CEST (UTC+2)	Figueiredo 60'; Carlsson (yellow card) 71'; Jonsson 80' (pen.)	Report	Nicklasson (yellow card) 30'; Gustafsson (yellow card) 59'; Keene (yellow card) 73'	Stadium: Råsunda Stadion; Attendance: 20,234; Referee: Peter Fröjdfeldt

15 July 2006 10	Malmö	3–1	AIK	Malmö
16:00 CEST (UTC+2)	Johansson 31', 82'; Andersson (yellow card) 55'; Nilsson (yellow card) 73'; Gabriel (yellow card) 81'; Júnior 86'	Report	Rubarth (yellow card) 17'; Sandberg (yellow card) 67' (yellow-red card) 78'; Özkan 90'	Stadium: Malmö Stadion; Attendance: 14,572; Referee: Peter Fröjdfeldt

23 July 2006 11	AIK	3–0	Halmstad	Stockholm
17:00 CEST (UTC+2)	Pavey 47'; Özkan 84'; Rubarth 87'	Report	Johansson (yellow card) 18'; Fribrock (yellow card) 37'; Rosén (yellow card) 59'	Stadium: Råsunda Stadion; Attendance: 14,833; Referee: Markus Strömbergsson

31 July 2006 12	IFK Göteborg	1–1	AIK	Gothenburg
20:00 CEST (UTC+2)	Lago 27'; Kihlberg (yellow card) 61'	Report	Moström (yellow card) 10'; Rubarth (yellow card) 42'; Mendes 77'	Stadium: Gamla Ullevi; Attendance: 13,124; Referee: Peter Fröjdfeldt

6 August 2006 13	AIK	1–0	Kalmar	Stockholm
17:00 CEST (UTC+2)	Figueiredo 11'; Jonsson (yellow card) 38'; Tamandi (yellow card) 64'; Johnson (yellow card) 72'	Report	Rydström (yellow card) 28' (yellow-red card) 64'	Stadium: Råsunda Stadion; Attendance: 15,652; Referee: Daniel Stålhammar

12 August 2006 14	Kalmar	1–3	AIK	Kalmar
16:00 CEST (UTC+2)	Petersson 4'; Carlsson (yellow card) 60'; Larsen (yellow card) 87'; Rosengren (yellow card) 89'	Report	Tjernström 17'; Pavey 29' (yellow card) 60'; Arnefjord (yellow card) 38'; Figueiredo (yellow card) 45'; Mendes 90'	Stadium: Fredriksskans; Attendance: 5,093; Referee: Jonas Eriksson

21 August 2006 15	Gefle	1–1	AIK	Gävle
19:00 CEST (UTC+2)	Makondele 39'	Report	Hulsker 9' (yellow card) 75'; Jonsson (yellow card) 65'; Rubarth (yellow card) 69'	Stadium: Strömvallen; Attendance: 7,151; Referee: Miro Ukalovic

27 August 2006 16	AIK	5–1	Öster	Stockholm
17:00 CEST (UTC+2)	Burgič 9', 16'; Figueiredo 33', 62'; Mendes 89'	Report	Zavadil 55'; Vasilj (yellow card) 57'; Backman (yellow card) 77'; Asha (yellow card) 90+3'	Stadium: Råsunda Stadion; Attendance: 18,100; Referee: Åke Andreasson

9 September 2006 17	Elfsborg	1–1	AIK	Borås
17:00 CEST (UTC+2)	Augustsson 50'; Ilola (yellow card) 58' (yellow-red card) 64'	Report	Carlsson (yellow card) 30'; Mendes 66'; Saraiva (yellow card) 80'; Arnefjord (red card) 85'; Rubarth (yellow card) 88'	Stadium: Borås Arena; Attendance: 15,756; Referee: Martin Hansson

17 September 2006 18	AIK	1–0	Häcken	Stockholm
17:00 CEST (UTC+2)	Sandberg (yellow card) 40'; Jonsson 58' (pen.); Pavey (yellow card) 90+3'	Report	Ljung (yellow card) 41'; Marek (yellow card) 77'; Forsell (yellow card) 89'; Jarlegren (yellow card) 90+1'	Stadium: Råsunda Stadion; Attendance: 15,724; Referee: Håkan Jonasson

20 September 2006 19	Djurgården	0–1	AIK	Stockholm
20:00 CEST (UTC+2)	Concha (yellow card) 18'; Komac (yellow card) 44'	Report	Tjernström 5'; Moström (yellow card) 47'; Hulsker (yellow card) 62'	Stadium: Råsunda Stadium; Attendance: 31,890; Referee: Peter Fröjdfeldt

26 September 2006 20	AIK	0–2	Hammarby	Stockholm
20:00 CEST (UTC+2)	Jonsson (yellow card) 55'; Carlsson (yellow card) 75'	Report	von Schlebrügge (yellow card) 2'; Eguren 4', 33'; Aubynn (yellow card) 6'; Johansson (yellow card) 11'; Arce (yellow card) 73'	Stadium: Råsunda Stadion; Attendance: 29,117; Referee: Stefan Johannesson

2 October 2006 21	Örgryte	0–0	AIK	Gothenburg
19:00 CEST (UTC+2)	Källander (yellow card) 85'; Aílton (yellow card) 90+6'; Dahlin (yellow card) 90+7'	Report	Tamandi (yellow card) 39'; Moström (yellow card) 41'; Arnefjord (yellow card) 90+6'	Stadium: Gamla Ullevi; Attendance: 3,685; Referee: Martin Hansson

14 October 2006 22	AIK	2–2	Helsingborg	Stockholm
16:00 CEST (UTC+2)	Burgič 47'; Carlsson 60'; Mendes (yellow card) 90+2'	Report	Dahl (yellow card) 37'; Shelton 39' (yellow card) 47'; Wahlstedt (yellow card) 59'; Stefanidis (yellow card) 64'; Arnefjord 90+3' (o.g.)	Stadium: Råsunda Stadion; Attendance: 22,514; Referee: Jonas Eriksson

21 October 2006 23	Halmstad	2–2	AIK	Halmstad
16:00 CEST (UTC+2)	Mattisson 18'; Fribrock 41'	Report	Burgič 74'; Özkan (yellow card) 79'; Carlsson 86'	Stadium: Örjans Vall; Attendance: 5,685; Referee: Peter Fröjdfeldt

26 October 2006 24	AIK	4–0	IFK Göteborg	Stockholm
19:00 CEST (UTC+2)	Rubarth 6'; Jonsson 33' (pen.); Rubarth (yellow card) 54'; Tjernström 65'; Figueiredo 78'	Report	Jonsson (red card) 33'; Johansson (yellow card) 50'; Berg (yellow card) 67'	Stadium: Råsunda Stadion; Attendance: 19,153; Referee: Martin Hansson

30 October 2006 25	GAIS	0–0	AIK	Gothenburg
19:00 CET (UTC+1)		Report	Tjernström (yellow card) 78'	Stadium: Ullevi; Attendance: 5,123; Referee: Martin Ingvarsson

5 November 2006 26	AIK	3–0	Malmö	Stockholm
15:00 CET (UTC+1)	Figueiredo 43'; Burgič 48'; Jonsson 65' (pen.); Sandberg (yellow card) 77'	Report	Gabriel (yellow card) 6'; Osmanovski (yellow card) 36'; Persson (yellow card) 42'; Mravac (yellow card) 79'	Stadium: Råsunda Stadion; Attendance: 30,999; Referee: Martin Hansson

=== Svenska Cupen ===
20 April 2006 Second Round	AIK	4–0	Hudiksvalls	Stockholm
19:00 CEST (UTC+2)	P.Karlsson 36'; Nouri 51'; Haynes 63'; Hulsker 73'	Report	Lindh (yellow card) 72'	Stadium: Råsunda Stadion; Attendance: 2,715; Referee: Johnny Lundbäck

18 May 2006 Third Round	Kalmar	1–0	AIK	Kalmar
19:00 CEST (UTC+2)	Johansson 31'	Report		Stadium: Fredriksskans; Attendance: 1,500; Referee: Miro Ukalovic
Note: Match was postponed at halftime due to waterlogged pitch, and was replayed on 7 June 2006.

7 June 2006 Third Round	Kalmar	4–1	AIK	Kalmar
19:00 CEST (UTC+2)	Ari 7', 79'; Santin 40'; Wastå (yellow card) 48'; Rydström (yellow card) 60' (yellow-red card) 88'; Johansson 71'; T.Carlsson (yellow card) 89'	Report	Jonsson 48' (pen.); Johnson (yellow card) 59'; N.Carlsson (red card) 69'	Stadium: Fredriksskans; Attendance: 1,513; Referee: Martin Ingvarsson

== Squad statistics ==
As of match played 5 November 2006

=== Appearances and goals ===
No.	Pos	Nat	Player	Total		Allsvenskan		Svenska Cupen	
No.	Pos	Nat	Player	Apps	Goals	Apps	Goals	Apps	Goals
1	GK	(Sweden) SWE	Daniel Örlund	26	0	26	0	0	0
2	DF	(Sweden) SWE	Markus Karlsson	9	0	6+2	0	0+1	0
3	DF	(Sweden) SWE	Niklas Sandberg	24	1	23+1	1	0	0
6	MF	(Sweden) SWE	Dennis Östlundh	3	0	0+2	0	1	0
7	MF	(Sweden) SWE	Kristian Haynes	10	2	2+6	1	1+1	1
8	MF	(Sweden) SWE	Daniel Tjernström	27	3	26	3	1	0
9	FW	(Slovenia) SVN	Miran Burgić	13	5	8+5	5	0	0
10	FW	(Brazil) BRA	Wílton Figueiredo	27	11	24+2	11	1	0
11	FW	(Norway) NOR	Bernt Hulsker	18	3	10+7	2	1	1
13	DF	(Sweden) SWE	Daniel Arnefjord	19	0	12+5	0	2	0
14	MF	(England) ENG	Kenny Pavey	20	3	18+1	3	1	0
15	FW	(Bosnia and Herzegovina) BIH	Admir Ćatović	2	0	0	0	0+2	0
16	MF	(Sweden) SWE	Mattias Moström	18	0	7+10	0	1	0
17	DF	(Sweden) SWE	Jimmy Tamandi	21	0	19	0	2	0
18	DF	(Sweden) SWE	Markus Jonsson	25	8	24	8	1	0
22	GK	(Sweden) SWE	Nicklas Bergh	2	0	0	0	2	0
23	MF	(Sweden) SWE	Mats Rubarth	23	2	17+5	2	1	0
24	DF	(Sweden) SWE	Nicklas Carlsson	23	3	18+3	3	1+1	0
26	FW	(Brazil) BRA	Daniel Mendes	14	4	7+7	4	0	0
27	DF	(Brazil) BRA	Marcio Saraiva	5	0	1+4	0	0	0
28	DF	(Sweden) SWE	Pierre Bengtsson	4	0	2+2	0	0	0
29	MF	(Sweden) SWE	Gabriel Özkan	10	2	6+4	2	0	0
30	MF	(Liberia) LBR	Dulee Johnson	28	0	22+4	0	2	0
Players away on loan:
4	DF	(Sweden) SWE	Per Karlsson	1	1	0	0	1	1
25	MF	(Sweden) SWE	Brwa Nouri	1	1	0	0	1	1
Players who appeared for AIK but left during the season:
5	DF	(Sweden) SWE	Johan Mjällby	1	0	1	0	0	0
20	MF	(Ghana) GHA	Derek Boateng	7	1	6+1	1	0	0
21	DF	(Sweden) SWE	Robert Johansson	1	0	0	0	1	0
26	FW	(Serbia) SRB	Nenad Lukić	4	0	1+2	0	1	0

=== Goal scorers ===
Place	Position	Nation	Number	Name	Allsvenskan	Svenska Cupen	Total
1	FW	(Brazil)	10	Wílton Figueiredo	11	0	11
2	MF	(Sweden)	18	Markus Jonsson	8	0	8
3	FW	(Slovenia)	9	Miran Burgić	5	0	5
4	FW	(Brazil)	26	Daniel Mendes	4	0	4
5	MF	(Sweden)	8	Daniel Tjernström	3	0	3
6	MF	(England)	14	Kenny Pavey	3	0	3
6	DF	(Sweden)	24	Nicklas Carlsson	3	0	3
6	FW	(Norway)	11	Bernt Hulsker	2	1	3
9	MF	(Sweden)	29	Gabriel Özkan	2	0	2
9	MF	(Sweden)	23	Mats Rubarth	2	0	2
9	MF	(Sweden)	7	Kristian Haynes	1	1	2
12	DF	(Sweden)	3	Niklas Sandberg	1	0	1
12	MF	(Ghana)	20	Derek Boateng	1	0	1
12	DF	(Sweden)	4	Per Karlsson	0	1	1
12	MF	(Sweden)	25	Brwa Nouri	0	1	1
TOTALS					46	4	50

=== Clean sheets ===
Place	Position	Nation	Number	Name	Allsvenskan	Svenska Cupen	Total
1	GK	(Sweden)	1	Daniel Örlund	11	0	11
2	GK	(Sweden)	22	Nicklas Bergh	0	1	1
TOTALS					11	1	12

=== Disciplinary record ===
Number	Nation	Position	Name	Allsvenskan		Svenska Cupen		Total	
Number	Nation	Position	Name	Booked	Sent off (straight red)	Booked	Sent off (straight red)	Booked	Sent off (straight red)
2	(Sweden)	DF	Markus Karlsson	1	0	0	0	1	0
3	(Sweden)	DF	Niklas Sandberg	4	1	0	0	4	1
8	(Sweden)	MF	Daniel Tjernström	2	0	0	0	2	0
10	(Brazil)	FW	Wílton Figueiredo	1	0	0	0	1	0
11	(Norway)	FW	Bernt Hulsker	4	1	0	0	4	1
13	(Sweden)	DF	Daniel Arnefjord	2	1	0	0	2	1
14	(England)	MF	Kenny Pavey	4	0	0	0	4	0
16	(Sweden)	MF	Mattias Moström	3	0	0	0	3	0
17	(Sweden)	DF	Jimmy Tamandi	3	0	0	0	3	0
18	(Sweden)	DF	Markus Jonsson	3	0	0	0	3	0
23	(Sweden)	MF	Mats Rubarth	8	1	0	0	8	1
24	(Sweden)	DF	Nicklas Carlsson	5	0	0	1	5	1
26	(Brazil)	FW	Daniel Mendes	1	0	0	0	1	0
27	(Brazil)	DF	Marcio Saraiva	1	0	0	0	1	0
29	(Sweden)	MF	Gabriel Özkan	1	0	0	0	1	0
30	(Liberia)	MF	Dulee Johnson	1	0	1	0	2	0
Players away on loan:
Players who left AIK during the season:
20	(Ghana)	MF	Derek Boateng	2	0	0	0	2	0
Total				43	4	1	1	44	6
