= Niklas Sandberg =

Niklas Sandberg may refer to:

- Niklas Sandberg (Swedish footballer) (born 1978)
- Niklas Sandberg (Norwegian footballer) (born 1995)
