= 2002 Superettan =

Superettan
- Season: 2002
- Champions: Öster
- Promoted: Öster; Enköping
- Relegated: Brage; Ängelholm; Mjällby
- Matches played: 240

The 2002 Superettan was part of the 2002 Swedish football season, and the third season of Superettan, Sweden's second-tier football division in its current format. A total of 16 teams contested the league.

== Overview ==
It was contested by 16 teams, and Östers IF won the championship.

== League table ==
Pos	Team	Pld	W	D	L	GF	GA	GD	Pts	Promotion, qualification or relegation
1	Östers IF (C, P)	30	16	6	8	61	35	+26	54	Promotion to Allsvenskan
2	Enköpings SK (P)	30	15	7	8	55	43	+12	52	Promotion to Allsvenskan
3	Västra Frölunda	30	14	9	7	54	33	+21	51	Qualification to Promotion playoffs
4	BK Häcken	30	14	9	7	52	33	+19	51	
5	Assyriska FF	30	12	9	9	36	27	+9	45	
6	Café Opera United	30	12	8	10	48	45	+3	44	
7	IFK Malmö	30	12	6	12	34	34	0	42	
8	Västerås SK	30	12	5	13	49	49	0	41	
9	Trelleborgs FF	30	10	9	11	42	41	+1	39	
10	Åtvidabergs FF	30	9	10	11	31	50	−19	37	
11	Gefle IF	30	9	8	13	45	47	−2	35	
12	IF Brommapojkarna	30	9	8	13	40	52	−12	35	
13	IF Sylvia	30	9	8	13	37	55	−18	35	
14	IK Brage (R)	30	8	10	12	49	55	−6	34	Relegation to Division 2
15	Ängelholms FF (R)	30	9	7	14	29	45	−16	34	Relegation to Division 2
16	Mjällby AIF (R)	30	8	5	17	42	60	−18	29	Relegation to Division 2

Source: svenskfotboll.se (in Swedish)
Rules for classification: 1) points; 2) goal difference; 3) number of goals scored.
(C) Champions; (P) Promoted; (R) Relegated

== Season statistics ==
=== Top scorers ===
Rank	Player	Club	Goals
1	(Sweden) Ludwig Ernstsson	Östers IF	18
2	(Sweden) Nichlas Norell	Enköpings SK	16
2	(Sweden) Olle Kullinger	Enköpings SK	16
2	(Sweden) Thomas Andersson	Västerås SK	16
2	(Sweden) Jimmy Rajala	IK Brage	16
6	(Finland) Keijo Huusko	BK Häcken	13
6	(Sweden) Pelle Andersson	IF Sylvia	13
6	(Sweden) Göran Marklund	Café Opera/Djursholm	13
9	(Sweden) Arash Talebinejad	Västra Frölunda IF	12
9	(Sweden) Andreas Ottosson	Östers IF	12
