= Daniel Hoch (disambiguation) =

Daniel Hoch (born 1979) is a Swedish footballer.

Daniel Hoch or Danny Hoch may also refer to:

- Danny Hoch (born 1970), American actor
- Daniel K. Hoch (1866–1960), U.S. Representative from Pennsylvania
