= Markus Tilly =

Swedish footballer

Markus Andreas Tilly (born 21 April 1976) is a Swedish association football coach and former player, currently serving as head coach of Ängelholms FF's U19 squad. He previously served as head coach of Damallsvenskan club FC Rosengård from 2014 to 2015.

== Playing career ==
Born in Ängelholm, Tilly began his playing career with Ängelholms FF in 1993 in Division 3. After three years at the club, he moved to Stockholm to study at the Swedish School of Sport and Health Sciences and play for IK Bele. In 1998, he returned to Ängelholm, where he would play until 2004, helping the club briefly reach Superettan before being relegated in 2002. He spent 2005 playing for Strövelstorps GIF in the seventh division. At the conclusion of the year, he retired as a player. He played as a left-back.

== Coaching career ==
In 1999, while he was playing for Ängelholm, he joined the club's youth side as a trainer. While playing for Strövelstorps GIF in 2005, he also served as the club's assistant manager. After retiring from play, he spent the 2006 season as head coach for Klippans FF. In 2008, he returned to Ängelholm to serve as a coach for its Tipselit side as well as an assistant coach for the club's A-side.

In December 2012, he was named an assistant manager for Damallsvenskan side FC Rosengård, serving under Jonas Eidevall. After Eidevall left the club in June 2014, Tilly was promoted to head coach. In July 2015, however, he went on sick leave for family reasons, with Therese Sjögran taking over as head coach in his absence.

In 2016, he returned to coaching, once again for Ängelholm, taking over as head coach for the club's U19 squad.
