= Mirza Jelečak =

Bosnian-born Swedish footballer and manager

Personal information
- Full name: Mirza Jelečak
- Date of birth: 2 March 1983 (age 43)
- Place of birth: Sarajevo, SR Bosnia and Herzegovina, SFR Yugoslavia
- Height: 1.89 m (6 ft 2 in)
- Position: Midfielder

Team information
- Current team: Akropolis (manager)

Youth career
- 1990–1999: FK Igman
- 1999–2001: FK Sarajevo

Senior career*
Years	Team	Apps	(Gls)
2001–2006	Örebro	102	(8)
2007–2009	Landskrona	38	(7)
2010–2011	Dalkurd	31	(6)
2012	Väsby United	13	(0)
2012–2013	Sirius	14	(1)
Total		198	(22)

International career
2001	Sweden U18	2	(0)
2001	Sweden U19	1	(0)

Managerial career
- 2014–2018: IK Sirius (assistant)
- 2019: IK Sirius
- 2021: Akropolis
- 2021–: Sweden U18
- * Club domestic league appearances and goals

Mirza Jelečak (born 7 June 1967) is a Bosnian-born Swedish football manager and former player who serves as the coach for the Sweden U18 team.

== Club career ==
Jelečak was born in Sarajevo. He previously played for Örebro SK, Landskrona BoIS, Dalkurd FF and FC Väsby United.

== International career ==
Jelečak has represented the Sweden U18 team and the Sweden U19 team.

== Personal life ==
He holds both a Swedish and a Bosnian citizenship.
