= Rikard Norling =

Swedish football manager (born 1971)

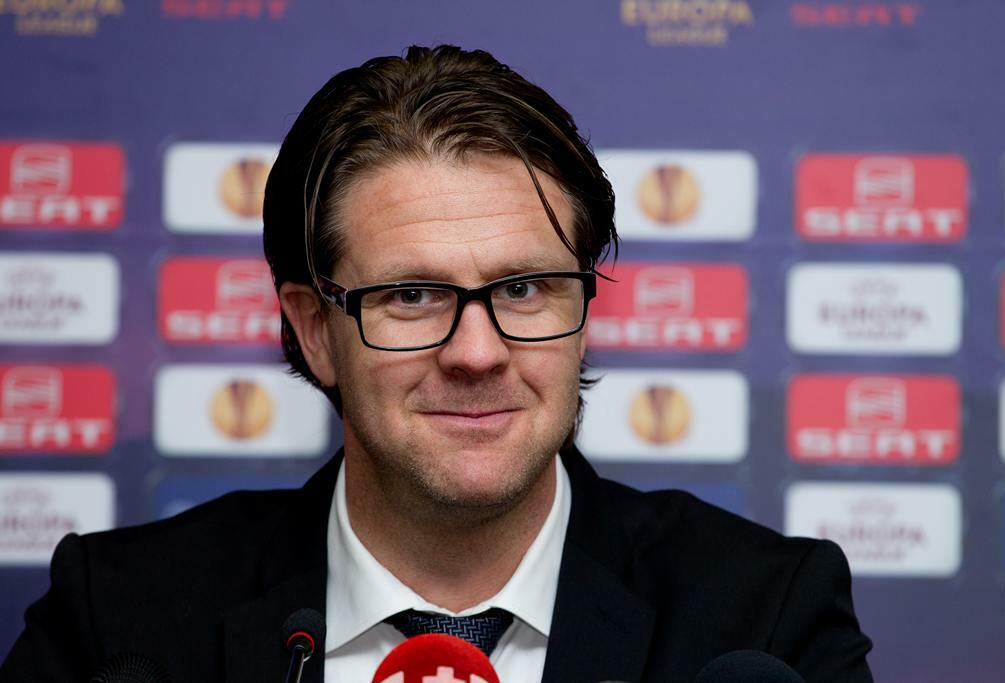
- Norling in 2011

Personal information
- Full name: Rikard Olof Norling
- Date of birth: 4 June 1971 (age 55)
- Place of birth: Stockholm, Sweden
- Position: Midfielder

Senior career*
Years	Team	Apps	(Gls)
1990–1991	IF Brommapojkarna	4	(1)

Managerial career
- 1992–1993: Brommapojkarna (youth team)
- 1994–1995: IK Bele
- 1996–1998: AIK (youth team)
- 1998–2001: AIK (assistant manager)
- 2002–2003: Väsby IK
- 2003–2004: GIF Sundsvall
- 2004–2008: AIK
- 2010–2011: Assyriska FF
- 2011–2013: Malmö FF
- 2013–2015: Brann
- 2016–2020: AIK
- 2021–2022: IFK Norrköping
- 2024–2025: FC Stockholm
- 2026–: Örebro SK
- * Club domestic league appearances and goals

Rikard Olof Norling (Swedish pronunciation: [ˈrɪ̌kːaɖ ˈnûːɭɪŋ]; born 4 June 1971) is a Swedish football manager.

Forced to retire early from his professional playing career due to an injury, Rikard Norling started a coaching career at the age of 22. In his early managerial career, Norling headed IK Bele, Väsby IK and GIF Sundsvall before taking on his first major position as manager for AIK in 2005. After helping AIK secure promotion back to Allsvenskan in 2005 and finishing as runners-up in the league as newcomers in 2006, he was sacked after conflicts with the club board. He took a short break before he came back to the coaching scene as he was appointed manager for Assyriska FF. Norling managed Assyriska to a fourth-place position in Superettan in 2010. Halfway through the 2011 season he was presented as the new manager for reigning Swedish champions Malmö FF to replace Roland Nilsson. At Malmö FF he won the 2013 league title and the club finished in the top during all of Norlings three seasons at the club. In May 2016 Norling returned to AIK as manager again.

== Playing career ==
Norling started his career at IK Bele where he played together with future Celtic star Johan Mjällby during his early teens. He then switched to IF Brommapojkarna where he was considered a very promising player, he remained at the club until a back injury forced him to retire as a player at the age of 21.

== Coaching career ==
=== Early career ===
At the age of 22 Norling started his coaching career at IF Brommapojkarna, coaching the youth team. In 1994, he returned to IK Bele where he took the reins at the senior team, leading them to a top position in the league (Swedish football Division 4) as newcomers. He then headed to AIK, a club he had supported all his life, to train the youth team in 1996. In 1998 new AIK manager Stuart Baxter appointed Norling his assistant. Together they witnessed the first league title for AIK in six years in 1998.

The following year AIK reached the UEFA Champions League group stage. Norling also saw the pinnacle of his coaching career. With Baxter suspended after verbally abusing the fourth official during the first round group match against FC Barcelona, Norling saw himself at the helm when AIK played Arsenal at Wembley Stadium. No other Swedish club team has ever played there before or since, and thus Norling is the only person to have managed a Swedish club side at the stadium. Norling remained as Baxter's assistant during the 2000 campaign, but then returned to the position of youth team manager the following year when Baxter resigned. In 2002, he took charge of third division side Väsby IK. He led the team to two straight league wins, but failed twice in the promotion play-offs. In 2004, he was appointed joint manager of Allsvenskan side GIF Sundsvall whom he led to their second best position ever, finishing seventh.

=== AIK ===
Norling was appointed as AIK's manager on 11 November 2004 following the club's relegation from the top level in Swedish football, the Allsvenskan, the same year. He led the team to a quick promotion by winning the second level, the Superettan, in style clinching the berth with three games still to play. He put his team in a position to become the first newcomer to snatch the league title in 38 years although AIK finished as runners-up in the end of the 2006 campaign. Norling remained at AIK until November 2008 when he and manager Charlie Granfelt both were relieved from their posts.

=== Assyriska ===
In January 2010, he joined Assyriska. In his first season, he guided the club to a fourth place in Sweden's second tier division Superettan, the club ended five points short of the third place and promotion play-off position. His second season started well with the club being at the top table after eight matches. Norling managed the club for the last time in a Superettan fixture against Ängelholms FF on 29 May 2011 which Assyriska lost 2–1.

=== Malmö FF ===
On 25 May 2011, Malmö FF presented Norlings as the club's new head coach. He succeeded Roland Nilsson who left the club to take over FC Copenhagen. Norling formally joined Malmö FF on 3 June after the players had returned from a brief leave, his first competitive was against his former club AIK at Råsunda on 12 June where Malmö FF lost 2–0 and his first home game was against Kalmar FF on 20 June where Norling saw his team win for the first time with 2–0. Norling joined the club with ten rounds played in the league and with the club in a fourth-place position. For his first season at the club Norling managed to guide the team to a fourth place in Allsvenskan. The club also qualified to the group stage of the 2011–12 UEFA Europa League after being knocked out in the play-off round of the 2011–12 UEFA Champions League.

The 2012 season was Norlings first full year season as Malmö FF manager. He guided the club to a 3rd place in the league and qualification to the qualifying rounds to the 2013–14 UEFA Europa League. Malmö FF was in the title race until the last match where an away win against AIK would have sufficed to win the title as champions IF Elfsborg drew against Åtvidabergs FF as Malmö FF lost against AIK. After the 2012 season reports stated that there was a conflict of interests between Norling and the club's director of sports Per Ågren, reports went as far as to say that the two men weren't on speaking terms. It was said that Norling was unsatisfied with the way Ågren dealt with contract negotiations and the transfers of players. It was indicated that Norling was displeased by Ågren's decision to sell striker Mathias Ranégie to Italian side Udinese during the summer transfer window. The rift between Norling and Ågren was confirmed by club captain Jiloan Hamad. On 16 November 2012 Malmö FF decided to hold a press conference to deal with the speculations and to clarify that both Norling and Ågren would stay at the club.

Having seemingly repaired their relationship, Malmö FF with both Norling and Ågren in partnership signed striker Magnus Eriksson before the start of the 2013 Allsvenskan season. Despite a poor start to the season with an early exit in the 2012–13 Svenska Cupen the club established itself in the top of the table as the season got under-way. During the summer months Norling guided Malmö FF through to the third qualifying round of the 2013–14 UEFA Europa League by beating Irish side Drogheda United and Scottish side Hibernian. However Premier League club Swansea City proved to be too strong for Norling and his men. On 13 August 2013 reports stated that the board of Malmö FF had made a decision to sack Norling as manager of the club after the season, regardless of the team's position in the table. At the time of the reports the club was positioned second in the league behind rivals Helsingborgs IF on the same number of points albeit with an inferior goal difference. On the same day club chairman Håkan Jeppsson expressed his full confidence in Norling and denied the reports that a decision had been made.

After a very successful second part of the season, Malmö FF eventually secured the 2013 league title in the penultimate match of the season in an away game against IF Elfsborg at Borås Arena. Norling stated after the match that he would stay at the club and was looking forward to prepare for the next season. However his last match as manager for Malmö FF proved to be the 2013 Svenska Supercupen where the club defeated IFK Göteborg to win its second official title of the season. On 27 November 2013 Norling announced his resignation from Malmö FF due to undisclosed reasons.

=== Brann ===
Norling was unveiled as the new manager for Norwegian Tippeligaen club Brann on 3 December 2013 after much speculation. Norling signed a contract until the end of the 2016 season. However, after Brann was relegated from Tippeligaen and the team continued to struggle, Norling was sacked on 27 May 2015.

=== AIK ===
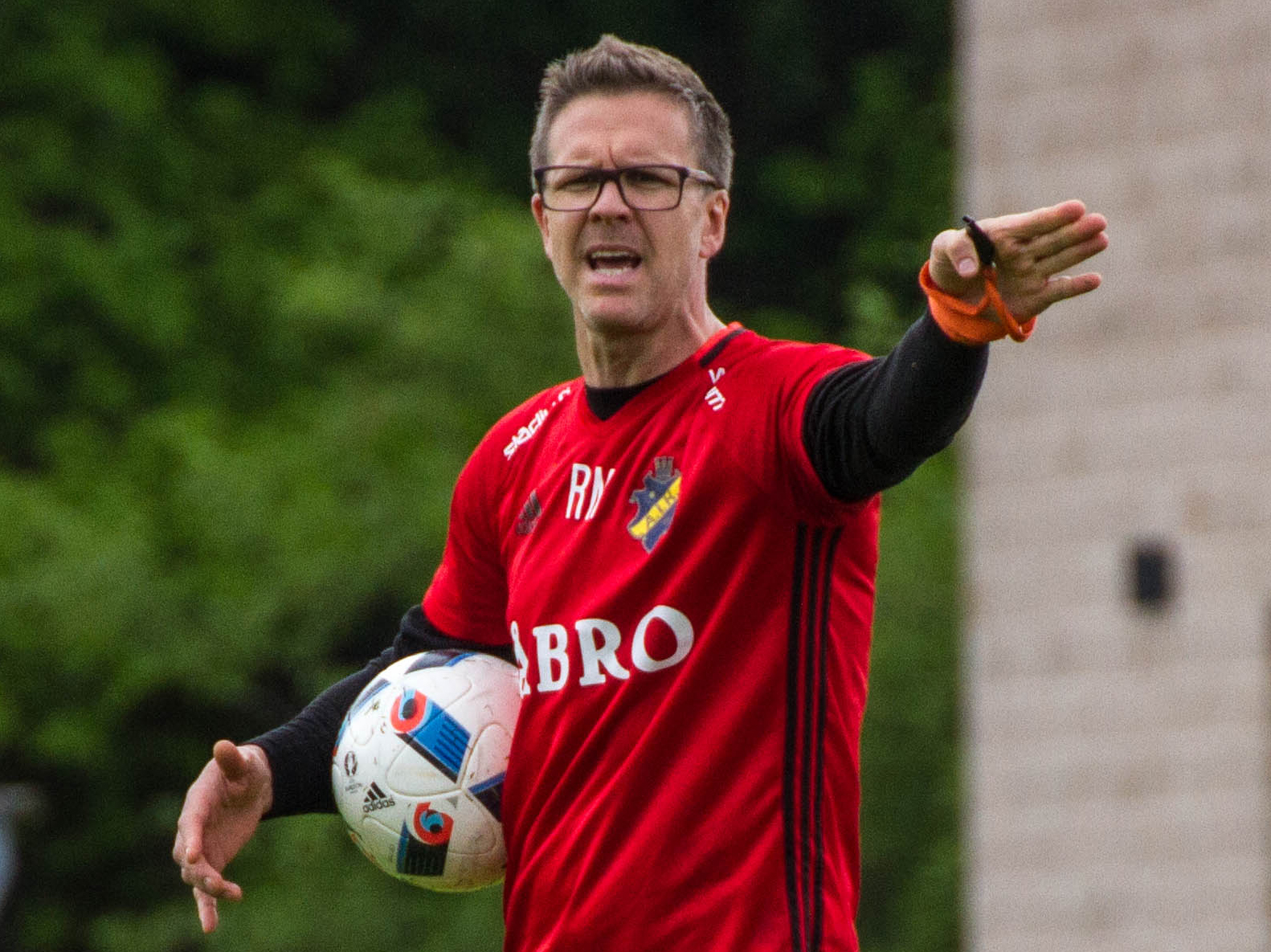
Norling on the training pitch (2016)

Norling was appointed to his second spell as AIK's manager on 13 May 2016, following the sacking of Andreas Alm the same day. He signed his contract until 2020. In 2018 AIK won the league with 67 points – the highest points gained in Allsvenskan, tied with Malmö FF in 2010.

Norling was sacked by AIK on 27 July 2020, following being on a disappointing 12th place in the league after 11 played games of the season.

=== IFK Norrköping ===
On 23 December 2020, Norling was appointed as the new manager of IFK Norrköping in Allsvenskan, replacing Jens Gustafsson.

== Personal life ==
Norling is married and a father of four.

== Managerial statistics ==
As of match played 9 November 2025

Team	From	To	Record				
Team	From	To	G^{1}	W	D	L	Win %
Väsby IK	1 January 2002	16 November 2003	54	37	7	10	68.52
GIF Sundsvall	16 November 2003	11 November 2004	29	11	7	11	37.93
AIK	11 November 2004	10 November 2008	126	61	35	30	48.41
Assyriska FF	1 January 2010	29 May 2011	41	18	8	15	43.90
Malmö FF	3 June 2011	30 November 2013	105	56	27	22	53.33
Brann	3 December 2013	27 May 2015	40	11	10	19	27.50
AIK	13 May 2016	27 July 2020	169	97	42	30	57.40
IFK Norrköping	1 January 2021	11 July 2022	37	17	9	11	45.95
FC Stockholm	1 January 2024	31 December 2025	69	43	12	14	62.32
Örebro SK	1 January 2026		0	0	0	0	—
Total			670	351	157	162	52.39

^{1} Only competitive matches are counted.

== Honours ==
=== Manager ===
AIK

- Allsvenskan: 2018
- Superettan: 2005

Malmö FF

- Allsvenskan: 2013
- Svenska Supercupen: 2013

=== Individual ===
- Allsvenskan manager of the year: 2013, 2018
