= Lasse Nilsson =

Swedish former professional footballer (born 1982)

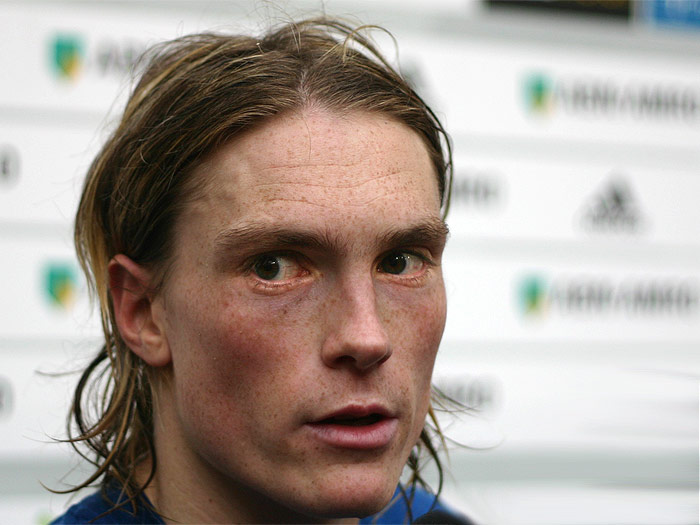
- Nilsson in 2007

Personal information
- Full name: Lars Thomas Nilsson
- Date of birth: 3 January 1982 (age 44)
- Place of birth: Borlänge, Sweden
- Height: 1.80 m (5 ft 11 in)
- Position: Forward

Youth career
- –2000: Islingby IK

Senior career*
Years	Team	Apps	(Gls)
2000–2001	Brage	45	(15)
2002–2004	Elfsborg	73	(16)
2005–2007	Heerenveen	76	(22)
2007–2009	Saint-Étienne	6	(0)
2008	→ AaB (loan)	12	(2)
2008	→ Elfsborg (loan)	15	(3)
2009	→ Vitesse (loan)	13	(4)
2009–2011	Vitesse	38	(9)
2011–2017	Elfsborg	135	(40)
2018	Norrby IF	23	(1)
Total		436	(112)

International career
2000	Sweden U19	4	(1)
2002–2004	Sweden U21	10	(0)
2004–2006	Sweden	2	(0)
- * Club domestic league appearances and goals

Lars Thomas "Lasse" Nilsson (born 3 January 1982) is a Swedish former professional footballer who played as a forward. Best remembered for his time with IF Elfsborg, he also represented clubs in the Netherlands, France, and Denmark during a career that spanned between 2000 and 2018. He won two caps for the Sweden national team between 2004 and 2006.

== Club career ==
Nilsson played for IK Brage, IF Elfsborg, sc Heerenveen, Aalborg Boldspilklub and AS Saint-Étienne. In 2007, Nilsson was loaned to Elfsborg from SC Heerenveen. Nilsson signed for Saint-Étienne on 8 August 2007, after leaving Heerenveen, in a four-year deal worth up to €3 million. In January 2009 he moved to Vitesse Arnhem on loan, a move which became permanent when he signed a three-year deal in June 2009.

== International career ==
=== Youth ===
Nilsson played four games for the Sweden U19 team, and represented the Sweden U21 team a total of 10 times, including at the 2004 UEFA European Under-21 Championship where Sweden finished fourth.

=== Senior ===
He made his full international debut for the Sweden national team in a friendly game against Norway on 22 January 2004, replacing Mats Rubarth in the 58th minute of a 0–3 loss. He won his second and last international cap on 15 November 2006, in a friendly game against the Ivory Coast. Nilsson started the game and played for 64 minutes before being replaced by Fredrik Berglund in a 0–1 loss.
