= Andreas Eriksson (footballer) =

Swedish footballer

Personal information
- Date of birth: 3 November 1981 (age 44)
- Place of birth: Sweden
- Height: 1.86 m (6 ft 1 in)

Senior career*
Years	Team	Apps	(Gls)
–2002	IFK Viksjö		
2002–2004	FC Väsby United		
2004–2005	AIK Fotboll		
2006–2007	FC Väsby United		
2007–2008	IK Sirius		
2009–2014	IF Brommapojkarna		
2015–2017	IK Sirius		
- * Club domestic league appearances and goals

Andreas "Ante" Eriksson (born 3 November 1981) is a Swedish retired football player who played as an offensive midfielder or as a forward.

Eriksson grew up in Sundbyberg, Sweden with IFK Viksjö as his home team. He has also played for FC Väsby United, AIK Fotboll and IK Sirius. He scored his first goal for AIK in the premiere against Sundsvall. In 2007, Eriksson scored 5 goals and 5 assists in 26 matches for Sirius. His strength as a football player is his ability to hold the ball and his inside game.

He is 186 cm (6 ft 1 in) tall and weighs 86 kg (190 lb).
