= Daniel Arnefjord =

Swedish footballer

Personal information
- Full name: Per Erik Daniel Arnefjord
- Date of birth: 21 March 1979 (age 47)
- Place of birth: Stockholm, Sweden
- Height: 1.87 m (6 ft 1 1/2 in)
- Position: Centre back

Youth career
- 1986–1991: Järva KFUM
- 1992–1997: IF Brommapojkarna

Senior career*
Years	Team	Apps	(Gls)
1998–2004	FC Café Opera United	147	(8)
2005	FC Väsby United	29	(2)
2006–2008	AIK	38	(0)
2008–2014	Aalesund	155	(12)
- * Club domestic league appearances and goals as of 15:01, 10 November 2014 (UTC)

Daniel Arnefjord (born 21 March 1979) is a Swedish footballer who last played for Aalesunds FK in the Norwegian Tippeligaen as a centre back.

== Career ==
After several seasons in the lower divisions Arnefjord got his breakthrough after he was bought from FC Väsby United to AIK when AIK returned to Allsvenskan in 2006. A bitter moment in the 2006-season was a misunderstanding between Arnefjord and AIK's goalkeeper Daniel Örlund, which led to Arnefjord heading the ball into his one goal in the home-match against Helsingborgs IF. When the league finished two weeks later, AIK was only one point behind the league-winners IF Elfsborg, had Arnefjord let the goalkeeper make the save, AIK would have won the title.

Arnefjord moved to Norway to play for Aalesunds FK, where he captained the Tippeligaen side until the end of the 2014 season. Arnefjord helped Aalesunds win its first two Norwegian Football Cup finals (in 2009 and 2011) during his spell with the club.

== Career statistics ==
Season	Club	Division	League		Cup		Total	
Season	Club	Division	Apps	Goals	Apps	Goals	Apps	Goals
2008	Aalesund	Tippeligaen	10	0	0	0	10	0
2009	Aalesund	Tippeligaen	28	0	6	2	34	2
2010	Aalesund	Tippeligaen	27	2	2	0	29	2
2011	Aalesund	Tippeligaen	28	1	7	2	35	3
2012	Aalesund	Tippeligaen	23	6	2	0	25	6
2013	Aalesund	Tippeligaen	11	1	0	0	11	1
2014	Aalesund	Tippeligaen	28	2	2	0	30	2
Career Total			155	12	19	4	174	16
