= 2005 Superettan =

Swedish football league season

Superettan
- Season: 2005
- Champions: AIK
- Promoted: AIK; Öster; GAIS
- Relegated: Boden; Västerås SK; Västra Frölunda
- UEFA Cup: Åtvidabergs FF
- Matches played: 240

The 2005 Superettan was part of the 2005 Swedish football season, and the sixth season of Superettan, Sweden's second-tier football division in its current format. A total of 16 teams contested the league.

== Overview ==
It was contested by 16 teams, and AIK won the competition.

== League table ==
Pos	Team	Pld	W	D	L	GF	GA	GD	Pts	Promotion, qualification or relegation
1	AIK (C, P)	30	19	7	4	56	27	+29	64	Promotion to Allsvenskan
2	Östers IF (P)	30	17	4	9	48	36	+12	55	Promotion to Allsvenskan
3	GAIS (O, P)	30	14	10	6	52	35	+17	52	Qualification to Promotion playoffs
4	Ljungskile SK	30	13	11	6	41	29	+12	50	
5	Örebro SK	30	12	9	9	40	32	+8	45	
6	IF Brommapojkarna	30	13	5	12	48	42	+6	44	
7	IFK Norrköping	30	12	8	10	44	40	+4	44	
8	Falkenbergs FF	30	11	8	11	38	43	−5	41	
9	FC Väsby United	30	11	6	13	32	40	−8	39	
10	Åtvidabergs FF	30	9	11	10	36	32	+4	38	Qualification to UEFA Cup first qualifying round (Note: Since the Svenska Cupen winners that year, Djurgårdens IF, qualified for the Champions League that year, their UEFA Cup berth was passed down to the finalists, Åtvidabergs FF.)
11	Trelleborgs FF	30	9	9	12	34	34	0	36	
12	Mjällby AIF	30	9	8	13	44	49	−5	35	
13	Degerfors IF	30	9	7	14	31	36	−5	34	
14	Boden (R)	30	9	5	16	28	48	−20	32	Relegation to Division 1
15	Västerås SK (R)	30	7	6	17	35	62	−27	27	Relegation to Division 1
16	Västra Frölunda (R)	30	7	4	19	32	54	−22	25	Relegation to Division 1

Source: svenskfotboll.se (in Swedish)
Rules for classification: 1) points; 2) goal difference; 3) number of goals scored.
(C) Champions; (O) Play-off winners; (P) Promoted; (R) Relegated

== Season statistics ==
=== Top scorers ===
Rank	Player	Club	Goals
1	(Brazil) Bruno Santos	IFK Norrköping	16
2	(Brazil) Wílton Figueiredo	GAIS	15
3	(Sweden) Jörgen Wålemark	Ljungskile SK	14
4	(Sweden) Fredrik Olsson	Mjällby AIF	13
4	(Sweden) Stefan Rodevåg	Falkenbergs FF	13
6	(Sweden) Olof Guterstam	IF Brommapojkarna	12
7	(Sweden) Jon Lundblad	Örebro SK	11
7	(Sweden) Pär Cederqvist	Östers IF	11
7	(Sweden) Johan Patriksson	Ljungskile SK	11
10	(Sweden) Marcus Ekenberg	Mjällby AIF	10

=== Top goalkeepers ===
(Minimum of 10 games played)

Rank	Goalkeeper	Club	GP	GA	SV%	ShO
1	(Sweden) Daniel Örlund	AIK	29	25	80	13
2	(Sweden) Niklas Westberg	Väsby United	28	36	78	6
2	(Sweden) Rickard Rickardsson	Trelleborgs FF	30	34	78	13
2	(Sweden) Kristoffer Björklund	IF Brommapojkarna	28	38	78	9
5	(Sweden) Tommy Naurin	Falkenbergs FF	30	43	77	5
5	(Sweden) Nicklas Svensson	Ljungskile SK	30	29	77	13
7	(Czech Republic) Dušan Melichárek	Mjällby AIF	15	23	76	3
7	(Sweden) Peter Westman	Örebro SK	30	32	76	11
7	(Sweden) Henrik Gustavsson	Åtvidabergs FF	27	30	76	6
10	(Sweden) Dime Jankulovski	GAIS	30	34	75	9
