= Admir Ćatović =

Bosnian-Swedish footballer

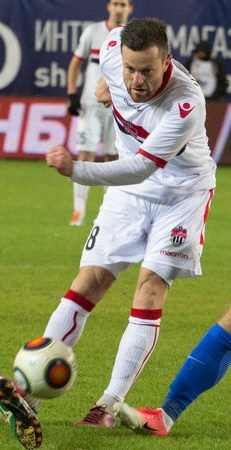
- Ćatović with Khimki in 2017

Personal information
- Full name: Admir Ćatović
- Date of birth: September 5, 1987 (age 39)
- Place of birth: Gacko, SR Bosnia and Herzegovina, SFR Yugoslavia
- Height: 1.78 m (5 ft 10 in)
- Position: Striker

Team information
- Current team: Assyriska FF

Youth career
- 1996–1997: Vasalund
- 1997–1998: Råsunda
- 1999–2005: AIK

Senior career*
Years	Team	Apps	(Gls)
2005–2006	AIK		(1)
2006–2010	Väsby United	76	(23)
2009	→ Syrianska (loan)	2	(0)
2010–2011	AIK	23	(1)
2012–2013	Assyriska FF	48	(12)
2014	KuPS	31	(6)
2015	VPS Vaasa	11	(1)
2015–2016	FC Fredericia	9	(1)
2016	Muharraq Club		
2016	Degerfors IF	12	(1)
2017	FC Khimki	12	(0)
2017	IK Frej	9	(0)
2019–	Assyriska FF	0	(0)

International career
2014–	Sweden Futsal	1	(0)
- * Club domestic league appearances and goals as of 4 November 2017

Admir Ćatović (Bosnian pronunciation: [tɕaːtoʋitɕ]; born 5 September 1987) is a Bosnian-Swedish footballer who plays as a striker for Assyriska FF.

== Career ==
Starting his career in the Vasalunds IF youth system, Ćatović moved on to Råsunda IS and eventually was picked up by AIK.

AIK was relegated to Superettan in 2004, and Ćatović took a place in the senior team prior to the 2005 season. However, his appearance on the field was limited to 2 league matches and 2 cup matches, he scored once against Västra Frölunda IF when he gave AIK the lead after nine minutes in a 3–0 victory.

When AIK was promoted back to Allsvenskan, Ćatović did not follow and was released to AIK's Farm team Väsby United. However the club was relegated immediately to Division 1, where he helped the club back by scoring 10 goals. During the 2008 Superettan he helpt Väsby to a 9th position by scoring 6 goals. He was loaned out to Syrianska FC prior to the 2009 season, but had only limited appearances for the club. In 2010 AIK suffered greatly from poor performance and brought Ćatović back to club, he however ended up in the shadows of first Mohamed Bangura and then Teteh Bangura.

Dissatisfied with his secondary role in the team, Ćatović broke his contract with AIK and signed for Assyriska FF. During the season of 2014 he played for KuPs (Kuopio, Finland).

On 28 July 2015, it was confirmed, that Ćatović had signed a season-long contract with Danish 1st Division club FC Fredericia. He left the club in January 2016, when his contract expired.

On 2 February 2017, he moved to the Russian club FC Khimki.

== Honours ==
Individual

- Veikkausliiga Player of the Month: June 2014
