= Anders Prytz =

Swedish footballer (born 1976)

Personal information
- Full name: James Anders Prytz
- Date of birth: 15 November 1976 (age 49)
- Height: 1.85 m (6 ft 1 in)
- Position: Defender

Senior career*
Years	Team	Apps	(Gls)
1993–1995	Örgryte		
1996	GAIS		
1997–2007	Örgryte		
1997	→ Lyngby		
2007	Fredrikstad	11	(1)
2008	Örgryte		
- * Club domestic league appearances and goals

Anders Prytz (born 15 November 1976) is a Swedish former football defender.
