= Andrew Kelly (footballer) =

English footballer (born 1984)

Personal information
- Date of birth: 9 January 1984 (age 42)
- Place of birth: Stockton-on-Tees, England
- Height: 1.87 m (6 ft 1 1/2 in)
- Position: Defender

Youth career
- Middlesbrough

Senior career*
Years	Team	Apps	(Gls)
2004	Köping FF		
2004	→Västerås SK (loan)	4	(0)
2004–2009	Landskrona BoIS	34	(0)
2005	→Västerås SK (loan)		
- * Club domestic league appearances and goals

Andrew Kelly (born 9 January 1984) is an English former footballer who last played for Landskrona in Sweden.

Having previously played for Köping FF, Kelly joined Landskrona in September 2004. He made his debut in the local derby against Helsingborgs IF in 2005 – a classic match for all Landskrona supporters since the game ended with a 4–3 win, and a goal in the 93rd minute.

In July 2005, he returned for a second spell on loan at Västerås SK.

On 16 May 2009, it was announced that he would leave Landskrona and move back to England.
