= 2005 in Swedish football =

The 2005 season in Swedish football, starting January 2005 and ending December 2005:

== Events ==
- 26 May 2005: IFK Göteborg loses the historical first final of the Royal League against FC København after 1–1 in full-time and 26 penalties in the shoot-out.
- 6 June 2005: AFC Ajax signs Malmö FF's Markus Rosenberg, the transfer being concluded when Ajax offered approximately 5.3 million Euros for Rosenberg, who joined the Dutch club July 4.
- 13 June 2005: Around 30 AIK fans starts a fight on Gamla Ullevi before the start of the game in Superettan against GAIS.
- 23 August 2005: Malmö FF are beaten twice (0–1, 0–3) by Swiss team FC Thun in the second qualification round to the UEFA Champions League. Discussions about the bad standard of Swedish club football take place.
- 12 October 2005: The Sweden national team secures a place in the 2006 FIFA World Cup by winning 3-1 against Iceland.
- 17 October 2005: Djurgårdens IF wins their 11th national championship in the second last round of Allsvenskan by drawing against Örgryte IS while IFK Göteborg lost against Hammarby IF.
- 24 October 2005: IF Elfsborg announce that as an apology for their "unacceptable" performance they will repay the admission fees and travelling expenses of the approximately 200 fans who travelled to Stockholm and witnessed their 8–1 thrashing by Djurgårdens IF on the last day of the season.
- 29 October 2005: Djurgårdens IF manages to win "the double" by beating Åtvidabergs FF in the final of Svenska Cupen.
- 9 December 2005: The final draw for the 2006 FIFA World Cup took place, Sweden being drawn to play Trinidad and Tobago, Paraguay and England.

== Honours ==
=== Official titles ===
Title	Team	Reason
Swedish Champions 2005	Djurgårdens IF	Winners of Allsvenskan
Swedish Cup Champions 2005	Djurgårdens IF	Winners of Svenska Cupen

=== Competitions ===
Level	Competition	Team
1st level	Allsvenskan 2005	Djurgårdens IF
2nd level	Superettan 2005	AIK
Cup	Svenska Cupen 2005	Djurgårdens IF

== Promotions, relegations and qualifications ==
=== Promotions ===
Promoted from	Promoted to	Team	Reason
Superettan 2005	Allsvenskan 2006	AIK	Winners
Superettan 2005	Allsvenskan 2006	Östers IF	2nd team
Superettan 2005	Allsvenskan 2006	GAIS	Winners of qualification play-off
Division 2 2005	Superettan 2006	Jönköpings Södra IF	Winners of promotion play-off
Division 2 2005	Superettan 2006	Qviding FIF	Winners of promotion play-off
Division 2 2005	Superettan 2006	Umeå FC	Winners of promotion play-off

=== Relegations ===
Relegated from	Relegated to	Team	Reason
Allsvenskan 2005	Superettan 2006	Landskrona BoIS	Losers of qualification play-off
Allsvenskan 2005	Superettan 2006	GIF Sundsvall	13th team
Allsvenskan 2005	Superettan 2006	Assyriska Föreningen	14th team
Superettan 2005	Division 1 2006	Bodens BK	14th team
Superettan 2005	Division 1 2006	Västerås SK	15th team
Superettan 2005	Division 1 2006	Västra Frölunda IF	16th team

=== International qualifications ===
Qualified for	Enters	Team	Reason
UEFA Champions League 2006–07	2nd qualifying round	Djurgårdens IF	Winners of Allsvenskan
UEFA Cup 2006–07	1st qualifying round	IFK Göteborg	2nd team in Allsvenskan
UEFA Cup 2006–07	1st qualifying round	Åtvidabergs FF	Runners-up of Svenska Cupen
UEFA Cup 2006–07	1st qualifying round	Gefle IF	UEFA Fair Play winners
UEFA Intertoto Cup 2006	1st round	Kalmar FF	3rd team in Allsvenskan
Royal League 2005–06	Group stage	Djurgårdens IF	Winners of Allsvenskan
Royal League 2005–06	Group stage	IFK Göteborg	2nd team in Allsvenskan
Royal League 2005–06	Group stage	Kalmar FF	3rd team in Allsvenskan
Royal League 2005–06	Group stage	Hammarby IF	4th team in Allsvenskan

== Domestic results ==
=== Allsvenskan ===
Pos	Team	Pld	W	D	L	GF	GA	GD	Pts	Qualification or relegation
1	Djurgårdens IF (C)	26	16	5	5	60	26	+34	53	Qualification to Champions League second qualifying round
2	IFK Göteborg	26	14	7	5	38	22	+16	49	Qualification to UEFA Cup first qualifying round
3	Kalmar FF	26	11	10	5	36	21	+15	43	Qualification to Intertoto Cup first round
4	Hammarby IF	26	12	7	7	43	30	+13	43	
5	Malmö FF	26	12	5	9	38	27	+11	41	
6	Helsingborgs IF	26	12	3	11	32	38	−6	39	
7	IF Elfsborg	26	10	7	9	35	43	−8	37	
8	BK Häcken	26	11	3	12	29	29	0	36	
9	Örgryte IS	26	10	5	11	37	38	−1	35	
10	Halmstads BK	26	9	5	12	38	38	0	32	
11	Gefle IF	26	9	4	13	27	33	−6	31	Qualification to UEFA Cup first qualifying round (Note: Sweden was among the best three associations in the UEFA Fair Play ranking and thus received an additional spot in the first qualifying round of the Europa League, Gefle received the qualifying spot for their ranking in Allsvenskans Fair Play ranking.)
12	Landskrona BoIS (R)	26	8	6	12	26	44	−18	30	Qualification to Relegation play-offs
13	GIF Sundsvall (R)	26	6	7	13	31	46	−15	25	Relegation to Superettan
14	Assyriska FF (R)	26	4	2	20	17	52	−35	14	Relegation to Superettan

Source: svenskfotboll.se (in Swedish)
Rules for classification: 1) points; 2) goal difference; 3) number of goals scored.
(C) Champions; (R) Relegated

=== 2005 Allsvenskan qualification play-off ===
October 26, 2005

GAIS	2–1	Landskrona BoIS

Gamla Ullevi, Gothenburg
October 30, 2005

Landskrona BoIS	0–0	GAIS

Landskrona IP, Landskrona

=== Superettan ===
Pos	Team	Pld	W	D	L	GF	GA	GD	Pts	Promotion, qualification or relegation
1	AIK (C, P)	30	19	7	4	56	27	+29	64	Promotion to Allsvenskan
2	Östers IF (P)	30	17	4	9	48	36	+12	55	Promotion to Allsvenskan
3	GAIS (O, P)	30	14	10	6	52	35	+17	52	Qualification to Promotion playoffs
4	Ljungskile SK	30	13	11	6	41	29	+12	50	
5	Örebro SK	30	12	9	9	40	32	+8	45	
6	IF Brommapojkarna	30	13	5	12	48	42	+6	44	
7	IFK Norrköping	30	12	8	10	44	40	+4	44	
8	Falkenbergs FF	30	11	8	11	38	43	−5	41	
9	FC Väsby United	30	11	6	13	32	40	−8	39	
10	Åtvidabergs FF	30	9	11	10	36	32	+4	38	
11	Trelleborgs FF	30	9	9	12	34	34	0	36	
12	Mjällby AIF	30	9	8	13	44	49	−5	35	
13	Degerfors IF	30	9	7	14	31	36	−5	34	
14	Boden (R)	30	9	5	16	28	48	−20	32	Relegation to Division 1
15	Västerås SK (R)	30	7	6	17	35	62	−27	27	Relegation to Division 1
16	Västra Frölunda (R)	30	7	4	19	32	54	−22	25	Relegation to Division 1

Source: svenskfotboll.se (in Swedish)
Rules for classification: 1) points; 2) goal difference; 3) number of goals scored.
(C) Champions; (O) Play-off winners; (P) Promoted; (R) Relegated

=== 2005 Svenska Cupen ===
Quarter-finals

July 22, 2005

IFK Ölme	0–6	Djurgårdens IF

Brovallens IP, Kristinehamn

August 3, 2005

Assyriska Föreningen	1–1 2–2 (aet) 12–13 (apen)	IFK Norrköping

Tunavallen, Eskilstuna

August 4, 2005

IF Elfsborg	4–3	BK Häcken

Borås Arena, Borås

August 4, 2005

Åtvidabergs FF	0–0 1–1 (aet) 6–5 (apen)	GAIS

Kopparvallen, Åtvidaberg

Semi-finals

September 8, 2005

Åtvidabergs FF	1–0	IFK Norrköping

Kopparvallen, Åtvidaberg

September 22, 2005

Djurgårdens IF	2–1	IF Elfsborg

Stockholms Stadion, Stockholm

Final

October 29, 2005

Djurgårdens IF	2–0	Åtvidabergs FF

Råsunda, Solna
