= Markus Karlsson (footballer, born 1979) =

Swedish footballer

Personal information
- Full name: Karl Markus Karlsson
- Date of birth: 13 December 1979 (age 46)
- Place of birth: Degerfors, Sweden
- Height: 1.76 m (5 ft 9 in)
- Positions: Left back; left winger

Youth career
- 1985–1997: Degerfors IF

Senior career*
Years	Team	Apps	(Gls)
1998–2002	Degerfors IF	60	(5)
2002–2004	FC Café Opera	55	(2)
2005–2006	AIK	31	(0)
2007–2008	Degerfors IF	52	(1)
- * Club domestic league appearances and goals as of 31 December 2008

Markus Karlsson (born 13 December 1979) in Degerfors is a Swedish retired football player.

He left his home town club Degerfors IF in 2003 when he signed for FC Café Opera. After two years there, he was picked up by AIK. Markus Karlsson played a full back or midfielder, preferably on the left wing. After the 2006 season, he was released as a free transfer by AIK, as his contract was not extended. He returned to Deferfors where he ended his career in 2008.
