= Kristoffer Arvhage =

Swedish footballer (born 1977)

Personal information
- Date of birth: 3 November 1977
- Place of birth: Borås, Sweden
- Height: 1.82 m (6 ft 0 in)
- Position: Defender

Senior career*
Years	Team	Apps	(Gls)
1998–2004	IF Elfsborg		
2004	AaB		
2005	AIK		
2006–2010	IFK Norrköping		
- * Club domestic league appearances and goals

Kristoffer Arvhage (born 3 November 1977) is a Swedish retired football defender.
