= Marcus Dahlin (footballer) =

Swedish footballer

Personal information
- Date of birth: 16 March 1982 (age 44)
- Height: 1.84 m (6 ft 0 in)
- Position: Defender

Senior career*
Years	Team	Apps	(Gls)
2001–2008	Örgryte IS		
2009–2010	FC Trollhättan		
- * Club domestic league appearances and goals

Marcus Dahlin (born 16 March 1982) is a Swedish retired football defender.
