= Patrik Anttonen =

Swedish retired footballer

Personal information
- Full name: Mats Patrik Anttonen
- Date of birth: 6 March 1980 (age 46)
- Place of birth: Örebro, Sweden
- Height: 1.78 m (5 ft 10 in)
- Position: Defender

Youth career
- Ervalla SK
- Hovsta IF
- 1994–1998: BK Forward

Senior career*
Years	Team	Apps	(Gls)
1998	BK Forward	20	(6)
1999–2010	Örebro SK	272	(17)
2011–2012	Örebro SK	20	(1)
2013–2015	Degerfors IF	81	(7)
Total		393	(31)

International career
1998	Sweden U19	4	(0)
2009	Sweden	1	(0)
- * Club domestic league appearances and goals

Mats Patrik Anttonen (born 6 March 1980) is a Swedish former professional footballer who played as a defender. He spent most of his career in his hometown club Örebro SK. He won one cap for the Sweden national team in 2009.
