= Diego Corpache =

Argentine professional footballer (born 1976)

Personal information
- Date of birth: 21 May 1976 (age 50)
- Place of birth: Buenos Aires, Argentina
- Height: 1.83 m (6 ft 0 in)
- Position: Defender

Senior career*
Years	Team	Apps	(Gls)
1996–2000	Deportivo Español	87	(0)
2001–2008	Inter Turku	151	(4)
2009–2010	FC Haka	15	(1)

Managerial career
- 2010–2014: TPS (Assistant manager)
- * Club domestic league appearances and goals

Diego Corpache (born 21 May 1976) is an Argentine professional football coach and a former player.

Corpache began his playing career in 1996 with Deportivo Español of the Primera División Argentina. He made his professional debut in a 1–1 draw against Belgrano de Córdoba on 7 April 1996. In 1998 Deportivo Español were relegated from the Primera División but Corpache remained with the club until 2000 when he moved to Finland to play for Inter Turku. After being released from Inter, he joined another Finnish Veikkausliiga club, FC Haka. After suffering a serious knee injury, Corpache announced his retirement from the game.

On 8 March 2010 it was announced that Corpache had joined Turun Palloseura's coaching staff as an assistant manager under the new manager Marko Rajamäki
