= Alban Jusufi =

Swedish-Albanian footballer

Personal information
- Date of birth: July 7, 1981 (age 45)
- Place of birth: Ängelholm, Sweden
- Height: 1.78 m (5 ft 10 in)
- Position: Striker

Senior career*
Years	Team	Apps	(Gls)
2001–2003	Ängelholm	25	(4)
2004	Klippan	21	(2)
2005	Trelleborg	17	(3)
2006	Raufoss	?	(?)
2007	A.C. Sansovino	?	(?)
2007–2009	Vllaznia	8	(1)
2009	Högaborgs BK	15	(9)
2010	Havant & Waterlooville	6	(1)
2011–2013	IFK Rössjöholm	30	(22)
- * Club domestic league appearances and goals as of 15:37, 27 February 2010 (UTC) ‡ National team caps and goals as of 1 November 2009

Alban Jusufi (born July 7, 1981) is a Swedish-Albanian football player. He has also played for Vllaznia Shkodër.

Jusufi has played in the Superettan for Ängelholm and Trelleborg.
