= David Leinar =

Swedish footballer

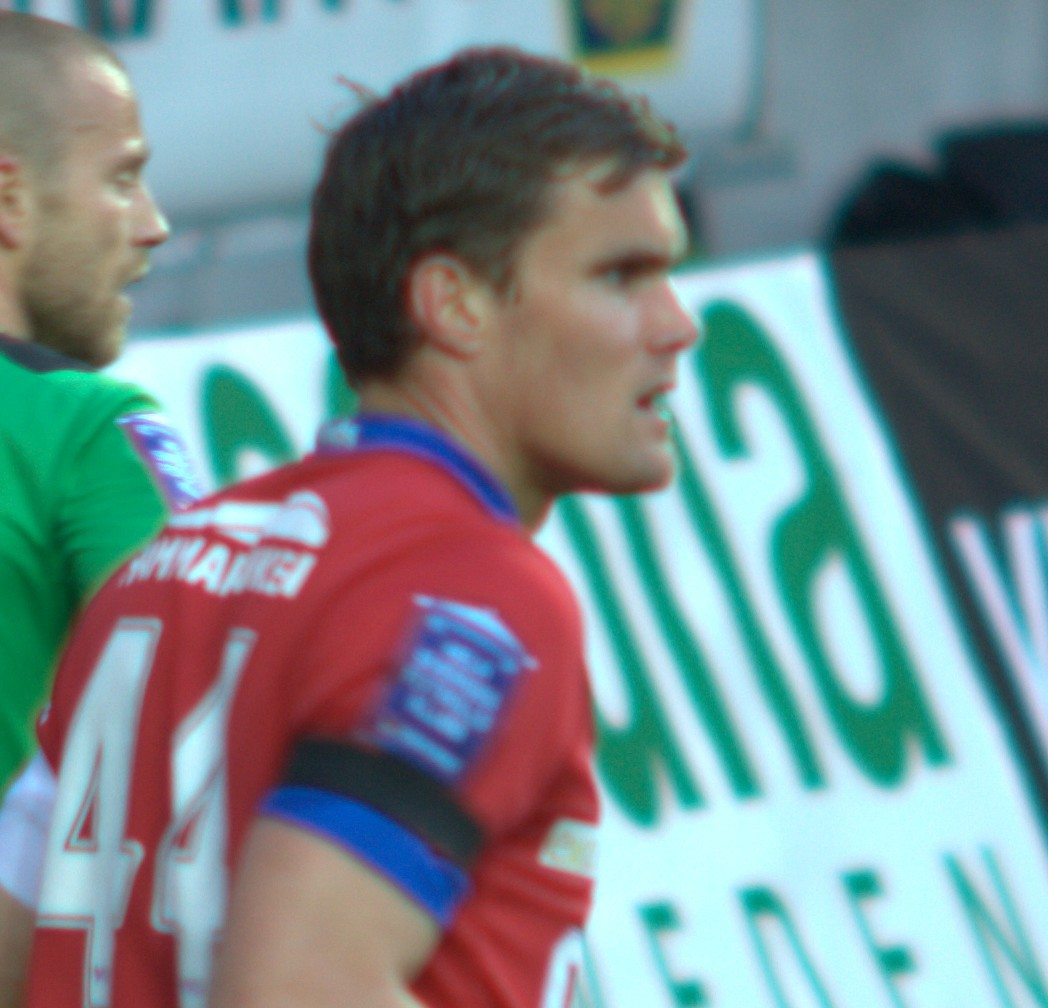

Personal information
- Date of birth: 12 November 1979 (age 46)
- Place of birth: Sweden
- Height: 1.88 m (6 ft 2 in)
- Position: Defender

Youth career
- Motala AIF

Senior career*
Years	Team	Apps	(Gls)
1997–1998	Motala AIF	2	(0)
1999–2000	BK Zeros		
2001–2003	Motala AIF	26	(4)
2005–2009	Ljungskile SK	110	(7)
2009–2014	Örgryte IS	139	(21)
- * Club domestic league appearances and goals

David Leinar (born 12 November 1979) is a Swedish former footballer who played as a defender.
