= Peter Westman =

Swedish footballer (born 1972)

Personal information
- Date of birth: 12 July 1972 (age 54)
- Position: Goalkeeper

Senior career*
Years	Team	Apps	(Gls)
2000–2010	Örebro SK		
- * Club domestic league appearances and goals

Peter Westman (born 12 July 1972) is a Swedish retired football goalkeeper.
