= Daniel Hoch =

Swedish footballer (born 1979)

Personal information
- Full name: Daniel Lars Hoch
- Date of birth: 11 May 1979 (age 47)
- Place of birth: Stockholm, Sweden
- Position: Striker

Youth career
- 1985–1989: Råsunda IS
- 1990: Vasalunds IF
- 1991–1996: IF Brommapojkarna

Senior career*
Years	Team	Apps	(Gls)
1997–2005	AIK	107	(22)
2006	Aalborg BK	4	(1)
2006	Assyriska FF	13	(2)
2007–2009	IK Sirius	67	(20)
2010	FC Väsby United	8	(0)
Total		199	(45)

International career
2000	Sweden U21	3	(0)
- * Club domestic league appearances and goals

Daniel Lars Hoch (born 11 May 1979) is a Swedish former football player who played as a striker.

He moved from IF Brommapojkarna to AIK in 1997, where he got his senior debut. After nine seasons at AIK, he moved abroad to play for Danish Superliga club Aalborg BK (AaB) in January 2006. In his first months at AaB, he was recovering from an injury, and after only nine games and two goals, he left the club again in July 2006. He returned to Sweden to play for Assyriska FF. In 2007, he signed for Swedish Superettan-club IK Sirius where he scored 20 goals in two seasons. Despite speculation about him leaving the club he signed a new contract in 2009.

== Honours ==
=== Club ===
AIK

- Allsvenskan: 1998
- Svenska Cupen: 1996–97, 1998–99
