= Benny Mattsson =

Swedish footballer

Benny Mattsson (born August 5, 1978) is a retired Swedish footballer who last played for [[Ånge IF]]. He retired in 2015. He has previously played for Ljunga IF, Fränsta IK, Stockviks FF, Selånger FK, IFK Sundsvall, Gefle IF and GIF Sundsvall. He is 5' 10" tall and plays as a striker.
