= João Afonso (footballer, born 1982) =

Portuguese footballer

Personal information
- Full name: João Miguel Duarte Afonso
- Date of birth: 11 February 1982 (age 44)
- Place of birth: Lisbon, Portugal
- Height: 1.90 m (6 ft 3 in)
- Position: Centre-back

Youth career
- 1994–1996: Sporting CP
- 1996–2001: Odivelas

Senior career*
| Years | Team | Apps | (Gls) |
| 2001–2002 | Odivelas | | |
| 2002–2004 | Estrela Vendas Novas | 35 | (0) |
| 2004–2005 | Barreirense | 7 | (1) |
| 2005–2008 | Torreense | 100 | (4) |
| 2009 | Olivais Moscavide | 15 | (0) |
| 2009–2012 | Mafra | 86 | (5) |
| 2012–2016 | Belenenses | 58 | (2) |
| 2016 | Mafra | 18 | (0) |
| 2016–2017 | Sintrense | 13 | (1) |
| Total | | 332 | (13) |
- * Club domestic league appearances and goals

João Miguel Duarte Afonso (born 11 February 1982) is a Portuguese former professional footballer who played as a central defender.

== Club career ==
Born in Lisbon, Afonso played lower league football until the age of 30, representing mainly S.C.U. Torreense and C.D. Mafra. In 2012, he signed a one-year contract with C.F. Belenenses in the Segunda Liga, making his professional debut on 14 October in a 1–0 home win against Portimonense S.C. and contributing 16 games and two goals during the season as the club returned to the Primeira Liga after three years.

Afonso's first appearance in the Portuguese top flight took place on 18 August 2013 (at the age of 31 years and six months), as he featured the full 90 minutes in a 0–3 home loss to Rio Ave FC.
