= Arash Talebinejad =

Iranian-Swedish footballer

Personal information
- Full name: Arash Talebinejad
- Height: 1.86 m (6 ft 1 in)
- Positions: Right midfielder; attacking midfielder

Youth career
- 1989–1992: Borås AIK
- 1993–1994: Brämhults IK
- 1995–1996: IF Elfsborg

Senior career*
Years	Team	Apps	(Gls)
2000–2003	Västra Frölunda	57	(17)
2003–2006	AIK	53	(15)
2006–2007	Tromsø	17	(1)
2007–2009	Brommapojkarna	44	(10)

International career
2002–2004	Sweden U21	3	(0)
- * Club domestic league appearances and goals

Arash Talebinejad (Persian: آرش طالبی‌نژاد, born 1981) is a retired football player. Talebinejad has represented the Swedish national youth football team.

== Career statistics ==
As of 5 May 2018

Club	Division	Season	League		Cup		Continental		Total	
Club	Division	Season	Apps	Goals	Apps	Goals	Apps	Goals	Apps	Goals
Västra Frölunda	Allsvenskan	2000	13	2	0	0	–	–	13	2
Västra Frölunda	Superettan	2001	16	3	0	0	–	–	16	3
Västra Frölunda	Superettan	2002	28	12	0	0	–	–	28	12
Västra Frölunda	Total		57	17	0	0	0	0	57	17
AIK	Allsvenskan	2003	11	2	0	0	–	–	11	2
AIK	Allsvenskan	2004	16	1	0	0	–	–	16	1
AIK	Superettan	2005	26	7	0	0	–	–	26	7
AIK	Total		53	10	0	0	0	0	53	10
Tromsø	Tippeligaen	2006	10	1	0	0	–	–	10	1
Brommapojkarna	Allsvenskan	2007	23	2	0	0	–	–	23	2
Brommapojkarna	Superettan	2008	21	3	0	0	–	–	21	3
Brommapojkarna	Total		44	5	0	0	0	0	44	5
Gröndals	Division 1	2009	2	0	0	0	–	–	2	0
Career total			166	33	0	0	0	0	166	33
