= Wílton Figueiredo =

Brazilian footballer (born 1982)

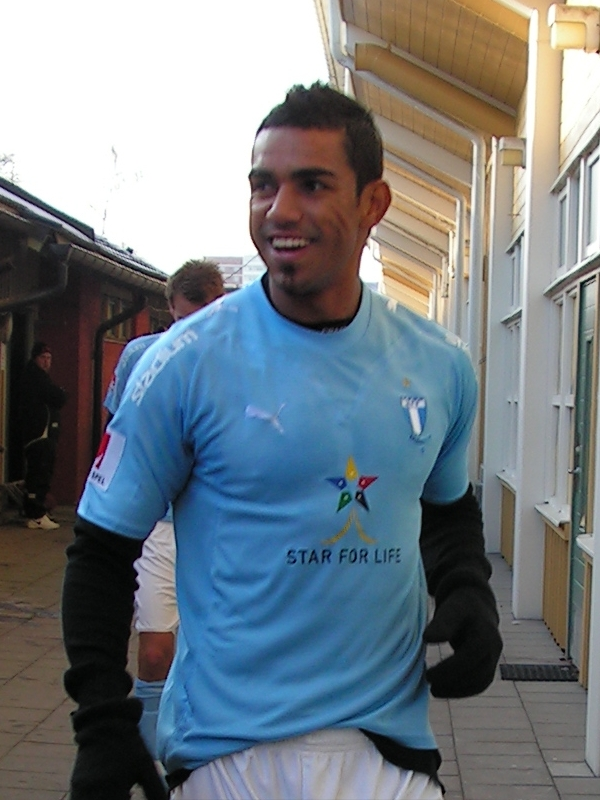
- Figueiredo with Malmö FF in 2010

Personal information
- Full name: Wílton Aguiar Figueiredo
- Date of birth: 17 March 1982 (age 44)
- Place of birth: São Paulo, Brazil
- Height: 1.83 m (6 ft 0 in)
- Positions: Midfielder; forward

Youth career
- 1994–1996: Palmeiras
- 1999–2002: São Paulo

Senior career*
| Years | Team | Apps | (Gls) |
| 2003 | São Paulo | 0 | (0) |
| 2004 | Ceará | 0 | (0) |
| 2005 | GAIS | 28 | (15) |
| 2006–2007 | AIK | 44 | (17) |
| 2007–2009 | Al Rayyan | | (12) |
| 2008–2009 | → Al Kharaitiyat (loan) | 12 | (3) |
| 2009–2012 | Malmö FF | 97 | (19) |
| 2013 | Gaziantepspor | 3 | (1) |
| 2013–2014 | Viborg FF | 14 | (1) |
- * Club domestic league appearances and goals

Wílton Aguiar Figueiredo (Brazilian Portuguese: [ˈwiwtõ fiɡejˈɾedu]; born 17 March 1982) is a Brazilian former professional footballer who played as a midfielder or forward.

== Career ==
=== Ceará and GAIS ===
A native of São Paulo, Brazil, Figueiredo played with such talents as AC Milan's Kaká and Inter Milan's Adriano at youth level. Figueiredo himself has never played at the top flight in Brazil. After a season with second division side Ceará FC he went to Sweden for a try-out session with AIK. After 40 days he was rejected and went to try out with GAIS. AIK had just been relegated from the top level and were not willing to take any economic risk, and thus did not offer the free agent a contract. Instead upon hearing of this news, GAIS acted quickly and signed Figueiredo for three years.

=== AIK ===
After having scored only two goals during the second half of the Superettan campaign he still garnered the interest of AIK who moved for a swoop during the pre-season of 2006. GAIS willingly agreed. Figueiredo enjoyed massive success in 2006, starting all but two games and scoring eleven goals for his new club in his debut season. The team finished as second in Allsvenskan, missing the title with only one single point.

On 19 January 2007, Figueiredo signed a new contract with AIK until the end of 2009.

=== Al Rayyan ===
A capable striker with a drilling shot and a strong ability to keep the ball at his feet while at the same time being able to find the through passes, Figueiredo was considered one of the best strikers in the Swedish league and attracted the interest from international clubs. In September 2007 he signed a five-year long deal with Qatari side Al Rayyan. However, he moved on loan to Al Kharaitiyat in August 2008.

=== Malmö FF ===
In April 2009 Figueiredo moved to Malmö FF in Sweden. Intended as the replacement of PSV Eindhoven-bound Ola Toivonen, Figueiredo was considered one of the most expensive purchases of a Swedish club ever. He was given the number 9 shirt and there were big expectations for the 2009 season, However Figueiredo scored only four goals in 24 games and was considered a disappointment by some. In his second season with Malmö, Figueiredo was moved down to the central midfield, where he had much greater success, being a key player in Malmö's resurgence during the spring of 2010, scoring quite a few spectacular goals from long range as well. He formed a strong and balanced midfield in the 2010 season together with teammate Ivo Pekalski where Figueiredo worked the offence and Pekalski the defence. At the end of the season Figueiredo won his first title ever with Malmö being at the top of the table. Still playing as central midfielder, Figueiredo managed to score five goals for the 2011 season as well. Figueiredo played slightly less for the 2012 season and produced the same number of goals as the last season. On 5 November 2012, after the last league fixture of the season it was announced that Figueiredo would leave Malmö FF when his contract ends on 1 January 2013.

=== Gaziantepspor ===
On 8 January 2013, Wilton Figueiredo joined Gaziantepspor in the Turkish Süper Lig on a free transfer.

=== Viborg FF ===
On 14 October 2013, Wilton Figueiredo joined Viborg FF in the Danish Superliga.

== Career statistics ==
As of 22 November 2013

Appearances and goals by club, season and competition
| Club | Season | League | | | Cup (Note: Includes Svenska Cupen, Emir of Qatar Cup, Svenska Cupen, Turkish Cup, Danish Cup.) | | Continental | | Total | |
| Club | Season | Division | Apps | Goals | Apps | Goals | Apps | Goals | Apps | Goals |
|---|---|---|---|---|---|---|---|---|---|---|
| GAIS | 2005 | Superettan | 28 | 15 | | | — | | 28 | 15 |
| AIK | 2006 | Allsvenskan | 26 | 11 | | | — | | 26 | 11 |
| AIK | 2007 | Allsvenskan | 18 | 6 | | | — | | 18 | 6 |
| AIK | Total | | 44 | 17 | | | 0 | 0 | 44 | 17 |
| Al Rayyan | 2007–08 | Qatar Stars League | | 12 | | | — | | — | 12 |
| Al Rayyan | 2008–09 | Qatar Stars League | — | | — | | — | | — | |
| Al Rayyan | Total | | | 12 | | | 0 | 0 | | 12 |
| Al Kharaitiyat (loan) | 2008–09 | Qatar Stars League | 12 | 3 | | | — | | 12 | 3 |
| Malmö FF | 2009 | Allsvenskan | 24 | 4 | 1 | 0 | — | | 25 | 4 |
| Malmö FF | 2010 | Allsvenskan | 27 | 5 | 2 | 0 | — | | 29 | 5 |
| Malmö FF | 2011 | Allsvenskan | 24 | 5 | 2 | 0 | 11 | 2 | 37 | 7 |
| Malmö FF | 2012 | Allsvenskan | 22 | 5 | 1 | 1 | — | | 23 | 6 |
| Malmö FF | Total | | 97 | 19 | 6 | 1 | 11 | 2 | 114 | 22 |
| Gaziantepspor | 2012–13 | Süper Lig | 3 | 1 | — | | — | | 3 | 1 |
| Viborg FF | 2013–14 | Danish Superliga | 9 | 1 | — | | — | | 9 | 1 |
| Career total | | | 186 | 67 | 6 | 1 | 11 | 2 | 203 | 70 |

== Honours ==
Malmö FF

- Allsvenskan: 2010
