= Göran Marklund =

Swedish footballer and coach

Personal information
- Full name: Göran Mattias Marklund
- Date of birth: 2 October 1975 (age 51)
- Place of birth: Stockholm, Sweden
- Height: 1.81 m (5 ft 11 in)
- Position: Forward

Senior career*
Years	Team	Apps	(Gls)
1993–1995	Spånga IS		
1996–1997	Vasalunds IF		
1997–1999	Dundee United	3	(0)
1999–2000	Vasalunds IF		
2000–2003	Café Opera United	104	(56)
2004–2006	AIK	21	(2)
2006–2012	Assyriska FF	125	(33)

Managerial career
- 2009–2011: Assyriska FF (assistant)
- 2011: Assyriska FF (caretaker)
- 2011–: Assyriska FF (assistant)
- * Club domestic league appearances and goals

Göran Mattias Marklund (born 2 October 1975) is a Swedish retired footballer and coach who is currently the assistant manager for Assyriska FF in Superettan. He played as a forward.
