= Kristian Haynes =

Swedish footballer and manager

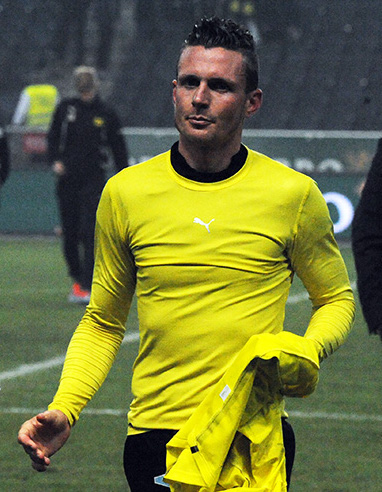

Personal information
- Full name: Dan Kristian Haynes
- Date of birth: 20 December 1980 (age 45)
- Place of birth: Malmö, Sweden
- Height: 1.79 m (5 ft 10 in)
- Positions: Attacking midfielder; central midfielder

Youth career
- 1987–1994: Oxie IF
- 1998–1999: Malmö FF

Senior career*
Years	Team	Apps	(Gls)
1995–1997	Oxie IF		
2000	IFK Trelleborg	21	(2)
2001	Höllvikens GIF	21	(8)
2002–2004	Trelleborgs FF	80	(17)
2005–2007	AIK	38	(7)
2007–2012	Trelleborgs FF	131	(26)
2013–2015	Mjällby AIF	49	(14)
2015–2017	Trelleborgs FF	69	(19)

Managerial career
- 2015–2019: Trelleborgs FF (assistant)
- 2018: Trelleborgs FF (caretaker)
- 2019: Trelleborgs FF (caretaker)
- 2020–2022: Trelleborgs FF
- * Club domestic league appearances and goals

Kristian Haynes (Swedish pronunciation: [ˈhaɪns]; born 20 December 1980) is a Swedish manager and former footballer who played as a midfielder. He was the manager of Trelleborgs FF for the three Superettan seasons 2020, 2021 and 2022.

== Coaching career ==
On 21 October 2019, Haynes was appointed caretaker manager of Trelleborgs FF for the second time, this time after the departure of Peter Swärdh. The club announced on 13 November 2019, that Haynes would continue in charge on a permanent basis.
