= Dennis Östlundh =

Swedish footballer

Personal information
- Full name: Dennis Carl Börje Östlundh
- Date of birth: August 30, 1977 (age 49)
- Place of birth: Stockholm, Sweden
- Height: 1.84 m (6 ft 0 in)
- Position: Centre midfielder

Youth career
- 1984–1991: Väsby IK
- 1992–1995: AIK

Senior career*
| Years | Team | Apps | (Gls) |
| 1996 | AIK | 3 | (0) |
| 1997–2002 | GIF Sundsvall | 138 | (43) |
| 2003–2004 | Assyriska Föreningen | 54 | (12) |
| 2005–2006 | AIK | 31 | (8) |
| 2007–2010 | Assyriska Föreningen | 67 | (15) |
| 2010–2012 | Jönköpings Södra IF | 53 | (2) |
- * Club domestic league appearances and goals as of 20 September 2012

Dennis Östlundh (born 30 August 1977) is a Swedish former footballer who last played for Jönköpings Södra IF in the Superettan.

A native of Stockholm, Dennis Östlundh, who is 184 cm. (just under 6 ft. 1 in.), holds the position of center midfielder.
