= Niklas Sandberg (Swedish footballer) =

Swedish footballer

Personal information
- Full name: Niklas Magnus Sandberg
- Date of birth: 3 September 1978 (age 48)
- Place of birth: Stockholm, Sweden
- Height: 1.89 m (6 ft 2 in)
- Position: Centre back

Youth career
- 1985–1989: Haningepojkarna
- 1990–1994: Västerhaninge IF
- 1996: AIK

Senior career*
| Years | Team | Apps | (Gls) |
| 1995 | Västerhaninge IF | 13 | (0) |
| 1996–1997 | AIK | 2 | (0) |
| 1998–1999 | IK Sirius | 48 | (3) |
| 2000 | Helsingborgs IF | 5 | (0) |
| 2001–2003 | FC Café Opera | 83 | (5) |
| 2004–2007 | AIK | 82 | (2) |
| 2007–2008 | CFR Cluj | 10 | (1) |
| 2008–2009 | Stabæk | 9 | (0) |
| 2009 | FK Haugesund | 22 | (1) |
| 2010 | SAFFC | 12 | (1) |
| 2011–2013 | IK Brage | 70 | (3) |
| Total | | 358 | (16) |

International career^{‡}
| 2007 | Sweden | 2 | (0) |
- * Club domestic league appearances and goals as of 23 November 2013 ‡ National team caps and goals as of 22 November 2011

Niklas Sandberg (born 3 September 1978) is a Swedish retired centre-back who last played for Swedish Superettan club Brage.

He started his career in the Swedish top flight in AIK in 1996 but only played two games during two years. After a spell at Helsingborg he returned to Stockholm in 2001 to play at FC Café Opera. He played there for three years and then returned to AIK in 2004. In May 2007 he was traded to Romanian first league side CFR Cluj, becoming the first Swedish footballer ever to play in Liga 1.

Sandberg is tall and strong on the ball, particularly aerial plays. Known for being an above average passer and reads the field. This translates to his position of defensive midfield.

In December 2009, Niklas Sandberg approached Singapore's S League champions, SAFFC on his own accord and eventually signed for them. SAFFC has qualified for the 2010 AFC Champions League Group Stages and this would make Sandberg a player who has played in both UEFA and AFC Champions League in his entire career thus far.

== Career highlights ==
Sandberg was capped twice by Sweden (2007). He played for Swedish AIK Stockholm from 1996 to 1998, and 2004 to 2007. Played in 1997 Uefa Cup Winners Cup quarter-final against FC Barcelona. Won Romania League title (2007–08) and Norway League title (2008) with CFR 1907 Cluj and Stabaek.
