= Nicklas Carlsson =

Swedish footballer (born 1979)

Personal information
- Full name: Nicklas Lars Carlsson
- Date of birth: 13 November 1979 (age 46)
- Place of birth: Stockholm, Sweden
- Height: 1.82 m (5 ft 11 1/2 in)
- Position: Defender

Youth career
- 1985: IF Brommapojkarna
- 1986–1990: Delsbo IF
- 1991–1998: IF Brommapojkarna

Senior career*
Years	Team	Apps	(Gls)
1999–2003	IF Brommapojkarna	122	(9)
2003–2005	AGF	41	(0)
2005–2007	AIK	67	(11)
2008–2010	IFK Göteborg	20	(0)
2011–2012	IF Brommapojkarna	43	(0)
- * Club domestic league appearances and goals as of 08:01, 7 April 2013 (UTC)

Nicklas Lars Carlsson (born 13 November 1979) is a Swedish retired footballer who played as a defender. His last club was IF Brommapojkarna.

== Career ==
He started out his career at local outfit IF Brommapojkarna before moving to Delsbo with his family at age 5. A few years later he returned to his native club with which he pursued a career taking him from the youth ranks all the way up to the senior team.

In 2003, he left for Danish Superliga side AGF. He became a regular there until the winter of 2004/2005 when he told his adviser he wanted to leave. His stated desire was to play for his father's old team and in March 2005 he signed a three-year contract.

He quickly became a regular for the relegated 10-times Swedish champions as a central defender. But he also became joint second top scorer in the team for the 2005 season by scoring seven goals. Many came through set-pieces with Carlsson's ability to score with his head proving a deciding factor.

Nicklas Carlsson scored both goals in the 2–1 win against Västerås SK on 3 October 2005, a win which earned AIK an Allsvenskan berth for the 2006 campaign. Carlsson is now a successful part of the 2006 squad which is within reach of claiming a shock 11th championship title.

During the 2007 season AIK announced they will not offer Nicklas a new contract, which went out after the season. And on 31 October he signed a three-year deal with Gothenburg side IFK Göteborg. 2010 his contract with IFK Göteborg ended and did not get renewed. On 1 December 2010 he signed a contract for his first club IF Brommapojkarna. He retired on 5 November 2012.
