= Skytteholms IP =

Sports ground in Solna, Sweden

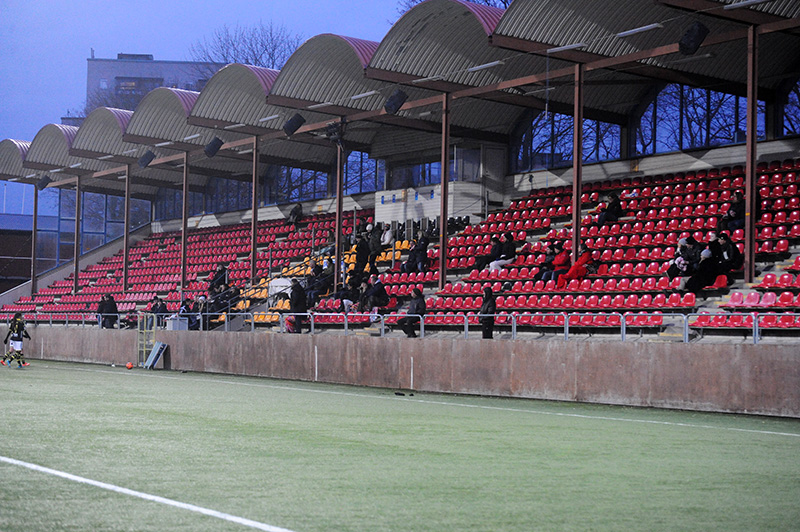
- Interactive map of Skytteholms IP
- Full name: Skytteholms Idrottsplats
- Location: Solna, Stockholm
- Coordinates: 59.3595°N 17.9919°E
- Owner: Solna Municipality
- Capacity: 5,200
- Surface: Artificial turf
- Field size: 105x65

Construction
- Opened: 1967
- Renovated: 1990; 2003

Tenants
- AIK DFF; AIK Fotboll (only friendly games); Vasalunds IF (198?-present)

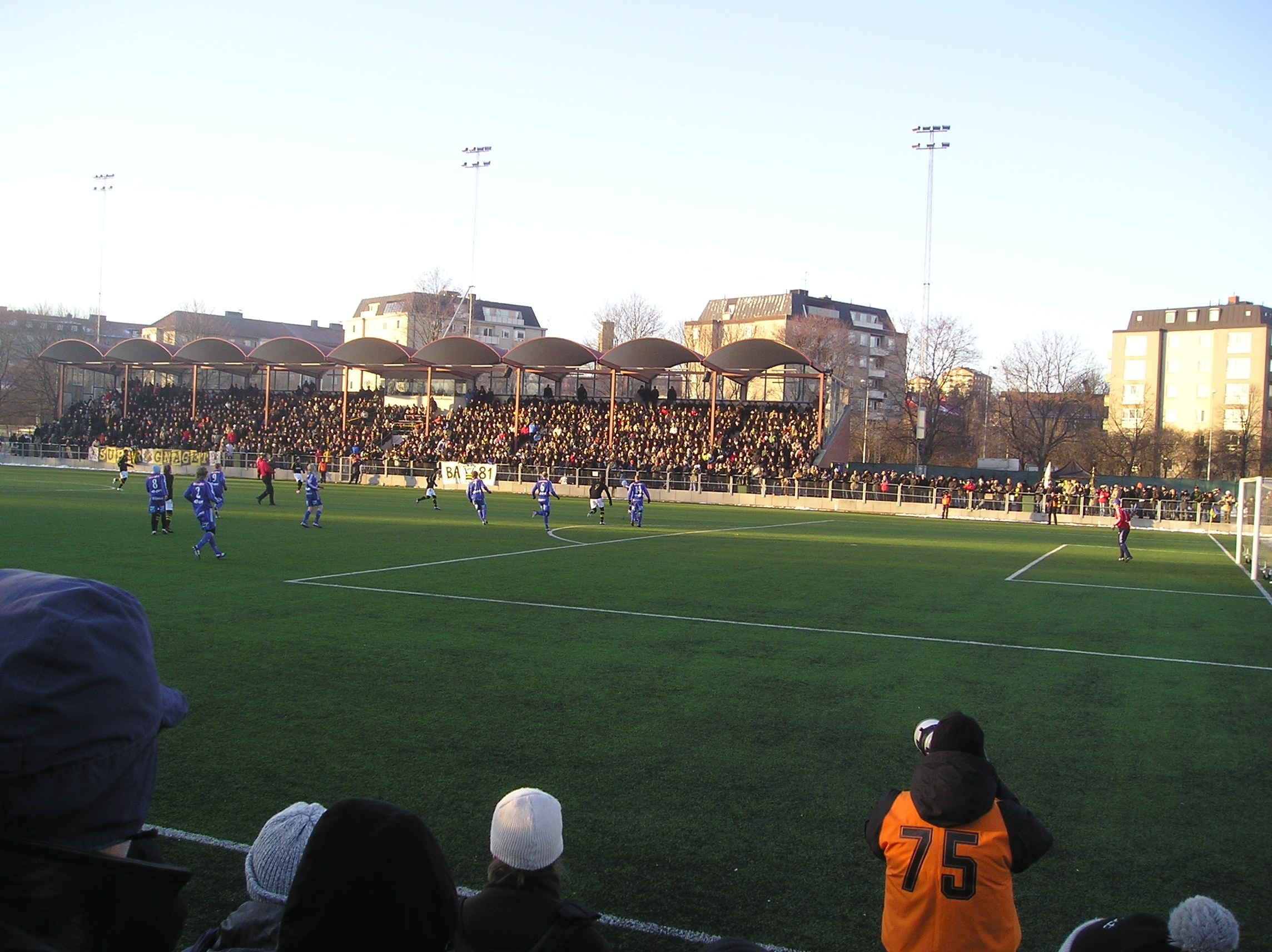

Skytteholms IP is a football stadium in Solna, Stockholm, Sweden and the home stadium for the football team Vasalunds IF. Skytteholms IP was opened in 1967, renovated in 1990 and 2003 and has a total capacity of 5,200 spectators.
