= Mats Rubarth =

Swedish footballer and musician

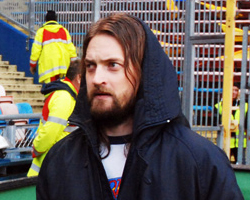

Personal information
- Full name: Mats Carl Rickard Rubarth
- Date of birth: January 25, 1977 (age 49)
- Place of birth: Örebro, Sweden
- Height: 1.78 m (5 ft 10 in)
- Position: Left winger

Youth career
- 1983–1991: IK Sturehov
- 1992–1996: Örebro SK

Senior career*
Years	Team	Apps	(Gls)
1997–2000	Örebro SK	62	(3)
2001–2008	AIK	154	(21)
Total		216	(24)

International career^{‡}
1993	Sweden U17	1	(0)
1999	Sweden U21	1	(0)
2004	Sweden	1	(0)
- * Club domestic league appearances and goals as of 20:57, 27 October 2008 (UTC) ‡ National team caps and goals as of 1 January 2006

Mats Carl Rickard Rubarth (born 25 January 1977) is a Swedish musician and former footballer, who played most of his senior career for AIK. He won one cap for the Sweden national team.

== Football career ==
=== Club career ===
Rubarth was a technical left-winger who liked to dribble past defenders from the left side of the pitch, even though he was right footed. He regularly provided strikers with good passes and consequently got quite a few assists during his career. During the 2003 season, which arguably was Rubarth's best, he also proved to be an able goal scorer, scoring ten times that season in Allsvenskan. One of his more famous goals was however scored in 2001 against local rivals Hammarby IF when he scored with a spectacular bicycle kick.

Though not a physical player, Rubarth picked up a staggering amount of yellow cards and quite a few red cards too. In 2003, he managed to get sent-off twice in a row. First against Helsingborgs IF in Allsvenskan and then in the next match against Fylkir in the UEFA Cup.

Despite his on-pitch temper problems, Rubarth was very popular at AIK's home ground Råsunda for several reasons, including his entertaining style and commitment to the club. On 31 October 2008 it was announced that he would quit the team after the current season and that the match against Helsingborgs IF two days later would be his last at Råsunda. He came on with 10 minutes left to play and received the love from the fans one last time. Rubarth left the club in January 2009, retiring from football at age 31.

=== International career ===
Rubarth represented the Sweden U17 and U21 teams a total of two times before making his full international debut for the Sweden national team on 22 January 2004 in a friendly game against Norway. He played for 58 minutes before being replaced by Lasse Nilsson in a 0–3 loss.

== Music career ==
An accomplished recording artist and composer, he previously recorded as a solo artist. He plays bass guitar in the Swedish glam-rock supergroup Casablanca. He is a member of the italo disco group Italove and has worked with noted artists in the genre, like Gazebo and Ken Laszlo.

== Discography ==
- 2001: Rubarth (EP)
