= Jimmy Tamandi =

Swedish footballer

Personal information
- Full name: Jimmy McCoy Tamandi
- Date of birth: 12 May 1980 (age 46)
- Place of birth: Malmö, Sweden
- Height: 1.80 m (5 ft 11 in)
- Position: Wingback

Team information
- Current team: GAIS
- Number: 5

Youth career
- 1986–1992: Nydala IF
- 1992–1998: Malmö FF

Senior career*
Years	Team	Apps	(Gls)
1999–2001	Malmö FF	51	(2)
2002–2004	AIK	64	(1)
2004	Salernitana	0	(0)
2004–2005	Potenza	5	(0)
2005–2007	AIK	49	(2)
2008–2010	Lyn	16	(0)
2010–2013	GAIS	21	(0)
Total		206	(5)

International career^{‡}
1995–1997	Sweden U17	18	(0)
1998–1999	Sweden U19	20	(0)
2001	Sweden U21	11	(0)
2001	Sweden	1	(0)
- * Club domestic league appearances and goals as of 31 December 2012 ‡ National team caps and goals as of 1 January 2006

Jimmy McCoy Tamandi (born 12 May 1980) is a Swedish former professional footballer who played as a defender. He represented Malmö FF, AIK, Potenza, Lyn and GAIS during a career that spanned between 1999 and 2013. He won one cap for the Sweden national team in 2001.

== Club career ==
He started his career at Nydala IF before moving to Malmö FF in 1992. He made his professional debut in 1999 when Malmö were relegated. He stayed with the team through promotion in 2000 and then also in the 2001 comeback campaign. In 2002, he switched to AIK where he has had mixed successes. In 2004, he was part of the team that were relegated. Tamandi had at this point already signed for Italian side Salernitana to where he moved in January 2005.

However, Salernitana had changed their management with the management that had signed Tamandi now gone. He was therefore forced out of the club and made play for Serie C side Potenza. In the summer of 2005 Tamandi returned to AIK and was a major part in the club's successful campaign for promotion back to the Allsvenskan. In 2007 he went for free to the Norwegian club Lyn. There he spent two years before the club went bankrupt. He then signed for GAIS and played there for three seasons and finished his professional football career.

== International career ==
Having represented the Sweden U17, U19, and U21 teams, Tamandi made his full international debut for the Sweden national team on 31 January 2001 in a friendly 0–0 draw with the Faroe Islands.
