= FC Väsby United =

- Full name: Football Club Väsby United
- Founded: 2005
- Dissolved: 2012
- Ground: Vilundavallen, Upplands Väsby
- Capacity: 4,000
Home colours	Away colours

FC Väsby United was a Swedish football club located in Upplands Väsby in Stockholm County.

== Background ==
=== FC Café Opera ===
FC Café Opera was created in 1991 by Italian born restaurateur Alessandro Catenacci who named the club after Café Opera which he owned. They started out in division 8 of the Swedish football league system but only nine years later they had made it to the second tier Superettan.

=== Väsby United ===
Football Club Väsby United was formed in 2005 when the two Stockholm clubs FC Café Opera United and Väsby IK merged. The new club replaced FC Café Opera United in the Superettan making it the youngest club competing at this level. Väsby United was a feeder club to AIK who participated in the second and third divisions of the Swedish football league system. The club played in Division 1 Norra which is the third tier of Swedish football when they became AFC United.

== Season-to-season ==
Season	Level	League	Pos
2005	Tier 2	Superettan	9th
2006 (Note: League restructuring in 2006 resulted in a new division being created at Tier 3 and subsequent divisions dropping a level.)	Tier 2	Superettan	14th (R)
2007	Tier 3	Division 1 Norra	2nd (P)
2008	Tier 2	Superettan	9th
2009	Tier 2	Superettan	12th
2010	Tier 2	Superettan	16th (R)
2011	Tier 3	Division 1 Norra	2nd
2012	Tier 3	Division 1 Norra	11th

== Attendances ==
Väsby United had the following average attendances:

Season	Average attendance	Division / Section	Level
2005	1,124	Superettan	Tier 2
2006	487	Superettan	Tier 2
2007	446	Div 1 Norra	Tier 3
2008	450	Superettan	Tier 2
2009	405	Superettan	Tier 2
2010	723	Superettan	Tier 2
2011	290	Div 1 Norra	Tier 3
2012	206	Div 1 Norra	Tier 3

The highest attendance for FC Väsby United at Råsunda was 8,672 spectators who attended the match with AIK on 15 August 2005.

== Achievements ==
=== League ===
- Division 1 Norra
  - Runners-up (2): 2007, 2011
