= 2007 AIK Fotboll season =

AIK
2007 season
- Manager: Rikard Norling
- Stadium: Råsunda Stadium
- Allsvenskan: 5th
- Svenska Cupen: Third Round vs IFK Norrköping
- Top goalscorer: League: Wílton Figueiredo (6); All: Wílton Figueiredo (11)
- Highest home attendance: 34,116 vs Djurgården (24 September 2007)
- Lowest home attendance: 7,528 vs Liepājas Metalurg (30 August 2007)
- Average home league attendance: 20,465 (Allsvenskan - 28 October 2007); 18,210 (All competitions - 28 October 2007)

AIK had a disappointing season, where the team did not win a single match in the wake of the sale of Brazilian star Wílton Figueiredo, dropping out of the title chase, missing European qualification in the process. Argentine recruits Iván Obolo and Lucas Valdemarín impressed upon their arrivals, forming an impressive unit with Figueiredo, which was curtailed when Al-Rayyan bought Figueiredo in September. The defense was arguably AIK's greatest asset, conceding just 28 goals, led by keeper Daniel Örlund and new talisman Nils-Eric Johansson.

== Season events ==
Prior to the start of the season, AIK announced the signings of Per Rønning, Patrik Karlsson, Alexander Gerndt and Niklas Westberg. Rønning and Karlsson both signed three-year contracts, whilst Nicklas Bergh joined Enköpings SK on loan for the season when Westberg signed.

On 11 January, AIK and venture capital company Agent 03, announced the signings of Khari Stephenson from GAIS to a four-year contract.

On 19 January, Wílton Figueiredo signed a new contract with AIK until the end of 2009.

On 21 May, AIK announced the signing of Nils-Eric Johansson on a free transfer from Leicester City, commencing 1 July, on a three-year contract.

On 26 June, AIK and venture capital company Agent 03, announced the signings of Iván Obolo and Lucas Valdemarín from Arsenal de Sarandí to three-year contracts commencing 1 July.

== Squad ==
As of match played 28 October 2007

No.	Name	Nationality	Position	Date of birth (age)	Signed from	Signed in	Contract ends	Apps.	Goals
Goalkeepers
1	Daniel Örlund	(Sweden)	GK	23 June 1980 (aged 27)	Spårvägens	2002			
22	Niklas Westberg	(Sweden)	GK	1 April 1979 (aged 28)	Väsby United	2007		3	0
Defenders
2	Patrik Karlsson	(Sweden)	DF	26 December 1980 (aged 26)	Gefle	2007	2009	27	2
4	Nils-Eric Johansson	(Sweden)	DF	13 January 1980 (aged 27)	Leicester City	2007	2010	20	0
5	Per Verner Rønning	(Norway)	DF	9 January 1983 (aged 24)	Kongsvinger	2007	2009	4	0
13	Daniel Arnefjord	(Sweden)	DF	21 March 1979 (aged 28)	Väsby United	2006		42	0
16	Pierre Bengtsson	(Sweden)	DF	12 April 1988 (aged 19)	Academy	2006		16	0
17	Jimmy Tamandi	(Sweden)	DF	12 May 1980 (aged 27)	Potenza	2005			
18	Markus Jonsson	(Sweden)	DF	9 March 1981 (aged 26)	Öster	2006		49	11
24	Nicklas Carlsson	(Sweden)	DF	13 November 1979 (aged 27)	AGF	2005		73	11
Midfielders
7	Pablo Monsalvo	(Argentina)	MF	17 January 1983 (aged 24)	Olimpo	2007		8	0
8	Daniel Tjernström	(Sweden)	MF	19 February 1974 (aged 33)	Örebro SK	1999			
14	Kenny Pavey	(England)	MF	23 August 1979 (aged 28)	Ljungskile	2006		48	5
15	Kevin Walker	(Sweden)	MF	3 August 1989 (aged 18)	Örebro	2007		2	0
20	Khari Stephenson	(Jamaica)	MF	18 January 1981 (aged 26)	GAIS	2007	2010	24	2
23	Mats Rubarth	(Sweden)	MF	25 January 1977 (aged 30)	Örebro SK	2001			
29	Gabriel Özkan	(Sweden)	MF	23 May 1986 (aged 21)	IF Brommapojkarna	2006		20	3
30	Dulee Johnson	(Liberia)	MF	7 November 1984 (aged 22)	BK Häcken	2006		61	3
	Magnus Eriksson	(Sweden)	MF	8 April 1990 (aged 17)	Academy	2006		0	0
Forwards
9	Miran Burgić	(Slovenia)	FW	25 September 1984 (aged 23)	Gorica	2006		20	6
21	Alexander Gerndt	(Sweden)	FW	14 July 1986 (aged 21)	Visby IF Gute	2007		7	1
26	Daniel Mendes	(Brazil)	FW	18 January 1981 (aged 26)	Degerfors	2006		39	6
27	Iván Obolo	(Argentina)	FW	28 September 1981 (aged 26)	Arsenal de Sarandí	2007	2010	19	6
28	Lucas Valdemarín	(Argentina)	FW	13 May 1978 (aged 29)	Arsenal de Sarandí	2007	2010	20	6
Out on loan
4	Per Karlsson	(Sweden)	DF	2 January 1986 (aged 21)	Academy	2003			
11	Bernt Hulsker	(Norway)	FW	9 September 1977 (aged 30)	Vålerenga	2006		25	3
	Nicklas Bergh	(Sweden)	GK	6 September 1982 (aged 25)	Eskilstuna City	2005		2	0
Left during the season
3	Niklas Sandberg	(Sweden)	DF	3 September 1978 (aged 29)	Eskilstuna City	2005			
6	Dennis Östlundh	(Sweden)	MF	30 August 1977 (aged 30)	Assyriska	2005			
7	Kristian Haynes	(Sweden)	MF	20 December 1980 (aged 26)	Trelleborg	2005		43	9
10	Wílton Figueiredo	(Brazil)	FW	17 March 1982 (aged 25)	GAIS	2006	2009	51	22
19	Robert Persson	(Sweden)	MF	13 November 1979 (aged 27)	Academy	2004			

== Transfers ==
=== In ===
Date	Position	Nationality	Name	From	Fee	Ref.
1 January 2007	GK	(Sweden)	Niklas Westberg	Väsby United	Undisclosed	
1 January 2007	DF	(Norway)	Per Rønning	Kongsvinger	Undisclosed	
1 January 2007	DF	(Sweden)	Patrik Karlsson	Gefle	Undisclosed	
1 January 2007	FW	(Sweden)	Alexander Gerndt	Visby IF Gute	Undisclosed	
11 January 2007	MF	(Jamaica)	Khari Stephenson	GAIS	Undisclosed	
28 January 2007	MF	(Sweden)	Brwa Nouri	Väsby United	Undisclosed	
1 July 2007	DF	(Sweden)	Nils-Eric Johansson	Leicester City	Free	
1 July 2007	FW	(Argentina)	Iván Obolo	Arsenal de Sarandí	Undisclosed	
1 July 2007	FW	(Argentina)	Lucas Valdemarín	Arsenal de Sarandí	Undisclosed	
28 August 2007	MF	(Argentina)	Pablo Monsalvo	Olimpo	Undisclosed	
31 August 2007	MF	(Sweden)	Kevin Walker	Örebro	Undisclosed	

=== Out ===
Date	Position	Nationality	Name	To	Fee	Ref.
1 March 2007	MF	(Sweden)	Dennis Östlundh	Assyriska FF	Undisclosed	
1 July 2007	DF	(Sweden)	Niklas Sandberg	CFR Cluj	Undisclosed	
1 July 2007	MF	(Sweden)	Robert Persson	Viborg	Undisclosed	
1 August 2007	MF	(Sweden)	Kristian Haynes	Trelleborg	Undisclosed	
1 November 2007	DF	(Sweden)	Nicklas Carlsson	IFK Göteborg	Undisclosed	
1 December 2007	FW	(Brazil)	Wílton Figueiredo	Al-Rayyan	Undisclosed	

=== Loans out ===
Start date	Position	Nationality	Name	To	End date	Ref.
1 January 2007	GK	(Sweden)	Nicklas Bergh	Enköping	1 February 2008	
1 April 2007	DF	(Sweden)	Per Karlsson	Åtvidaberg	30 November 2007	
20 August 2007	FW	(Norway)	Bernt Hulsker	IK Start	30 November 2007	

=== Released ===
Date	Position	Nationality	Name	Joined	Date	Ref
31 December 2007	GK	(Sweden)	Niklas Westberg	Väsby United	1 January 2008	
31 December 2007	DF	(Sweden)	Jimmy Tamandi	Lyn	1 January 2008	
31 December 2007	MF	(Argentina)	Pablo Monsalvo	Newell's Old Boys	1 July 2008	
31 December 2007	FW	(Norway)	Bernt Hulsker	IK Start	1 January 2008	

=== Trial ===
Date from	Position	Nationality	Name	Last club	Date to	Ref
Winter 2007	MF	(Tanzania)	Kali Ongala	Väsby United		

== Friendlies ==
6 February 2007	Syrianska	1–2	AIK	Södertälje
19:00 CET (UTC+1)	Kanga 27'; Ristić (yellow card) 58'	Report	Tamandi 44'; Ongala 90+1'	Stadium: Södertälje Football Arena; Attendance: 750

10 February 2007	AIK	3–0	GIF Sundsvall	Stockholm
14:00 CET (UTC+1)	Mendes 29'; Carlsson 44'; Johnson 55'	Report	Söderberg (yellow card) 79'	Stadium: Skytteholms IP; Attendance: 3,511; Referee: Jonas Eriksson

17 February 2007	AIK	4–0	IK Sirius	Stockholm
14:00 CET (UTC+1)	Gerndt 14'; Hulsker 32'; Mendes 71', 74'	Report		Stadium: Skytteholms IP; Attendance: 2,225; Referee: Markus Strömbergsson

24 February 2007	AIK	0–0	Flora	Stockholm
14:00 CET (UTC+1)		Report	Mazurkevits (yellow card) 24'; (yellow card) 73'; Sidorenkov (yellow card) 88'	Stadium: Skytteholms IP; Attendance: 4,300; Referee: Johnny Lundbäck

3 March 2007	AIK	4–4	Gefle IF	Stockholm
14:00 CET (UTC+1)	Figueiredo 37', 59', 71'; Hulsker 51'; Carlsson (yellow card) 64'; Stephenson (yellow card) 83'	Report	Oremo 8'; Makondele 44', 55'; Stolpa (yellow card) 64'; 79' (o.g.); Woxlin (yellow card) 85'	Stadium: Skytteholms IP; Attendance: 1,800; Referee: Keijo Hyvärinen

10 March 2007	AIK	5–0	IF Brommapojkarna	Stockholm
14:00 CET (UTC+1)	Figueiredo (yellow card) 17'; Carlsson (yellow card) 19'; Mendes 55', 65'; Stephenson 63'; Rubarth 68' (pen.) (yellow card) 71'; Burgić 74'	Report	Malmström (yellow card) 51'; Ekström (yellow card) 56'	Stadium: Skytteholms IP; Attendance: 4,214; Referee: Stefan Johannesson

21 March 2007	Louletano DC	0–3	AIK	Loulé
16:00 CET (UTC+1)		Report	Pavey 20'; Gerndt 40'; Figueiredo 53'	Stadium: Estádio Municipal de Loulé; Attendance: 25

31 March 2007	AIK	1–0	TPS	Stockholm
14:00 CEST (UTC+2)	Pavey 68'	Report		Stadium: Ulriksdals IP; Attendance: 1,500; Referee: Markus Strömbergsson

2 June 2007	Visby IF Gute	0–8	AIK	Visby
16:00 CEST (UTC+2)		Report	Haynes 10', 28'; Figueiredo 33', 59', 71'; Mendes 40'; Pavey 52', 57'	Stadium: Gutavallen; Attendance: 623; Referee: Rickard Pettersson

16 October 2007	Eskilstuna City	1–3	AIK	Eskilstuna
19:00 CEST (UTC+2)	Eriksson 81'	Report	Gerndt 29'; Obolo 59'; Jagne 83'	Stadium: Tunavallen; Attendance: 1,025

== Competitions ==
=== Overview ===
Competition	First match	Last match	Starting round	Final position	Record							
Competition	First match	Last match	Starting round	Final position	Pld	W	D	L	GF	GA	GD	Win %
Allsvenskan	9 April 2007	28 October 2007	Matchday 1	5th	26	10	8	8	30	27	+3	38.46
Svenska Cupen	1 May 2007	24 May 2007	Second round	Third round	2	1	0	1	1	1	+0	50.00
UEFA Cup	19 July 2007	4 October 2007	First qualifying round	First round	6	3	1	2	13	4	+9	50.00
Total					34	14	9	11	44	32	+12	41.18

Last updated: 28 October 2007
Source: Competitions

=== Allsvenskan ===
==== League table ====
Pos	Team	Pld	W	D	L	GF	GA	GD	Pts	Qualification or relegation
3	Djurgårdens IF	26	13	7	6	39	24	+15	46	Qualification to UEFA Cup first qualifying round
4	IF Elfsborg	26	10	10	6	39	30	+9	40	Qualification to Intertoto Cup first round
5	AIK	26	10	8	8	30	27	+3	38	
6	Hammarby IF	26	11	3	12	35	31	+4	36	
7	Halmstads BK	26	9	9	8	33	41	−8	36	

Source: svenskfotboll.se (in Swedish)
Rules for classification: 1) points; 2) goal difference; 3) number of goals scored.

==== Results summary ====
Overall								Home						Away					
Pld	W	D	L	GF	GA	GD	Pts	W	D	L	GF	GA	GD	W	D	L	GF	GA	GD
26	10	8	8	30	27	+3	38	5	4	4	13	8	+5	5	4	4	17	19	−2

Last updated: 28 October 2007.
Source: Results

==== Results by matchday ====
Matchday	1	2	3	4	5	6	7	8	9	10	11	12	13	14	15	16	17	18	19	20	21	22	23	24	25	26
Ground	H	A	H	A	H	A	H	A	H	A	A	H	H	A	A	H	H	A	H	A	A	H	H	A	H	A
Result	L	W	W	L	L	W	D	L	D	D	D	W	L	L	W	W	W	W	W	W	D	D	D	D	L	L
Position																										

Updated to match(es) played on 28 October 2007. Source: Results
A = Away; H = Home; W = Win; D = Draw; L = Loss; P = Postponed

==== Results ====
9 April 2007 1	AIK	0–1	Kalmar	Stockholm
15:00 CEST (UTC+2)	Hulsker (yellow card) 57'; Mendes (yellow card) 64'	Report	Santin 35'	Stadium: Råsunda Stadion; Attendance: 26,334; Referee: Martin Ingvarsson

17 April 2007 2	IFK Göteborg	1–2	AIK	Gothenburg
19:00 CEST (UTC+2)	J.Berg 16'; Sigurðsson (yellow card) 36'; Vasquez (yellow card) 57'	Report	Johnson (yellow card) 16'; Rønning (yellow card) 52'; Burgić 54'; Rubarth (yellow card) 83'; Figueiredo 87'	Stadium: Ullevi; Attendance: 18,162; Referee: Martin Hansson

24 April 2007 3	AIK	1–0	Hammarby	Stockholm
20:00 CEST (UTC+2)	Mendes 12'	Report	Eguren (yellow card) 24'; Zengin (yellow card) 64'; Andersson (yellow card) 90+1'	Stadium: Råsunda Stadion; Attendance: 30,318; Referee: Martin Ingvarsson

28 April 2007 4	Malmö	4–0	AIK	Malmö
16:00 CEST (UTC+2)	Dixon (yellow card) 16'; Júnior 24', 48'; Toivonen 36'; Johansson 77'; Andersson (yellow card) 82'	Report	Pavey (yellow card) 82'; Figueiredo (yellow card) 89'; Hulsker (yellow card) 90+1'	Stadium: Malmö Stadion; Attendance: 15,876; Referee: Peter Fröjdfeldt

5 May 2007 5	AIK	0–1	Helsingborg	Stockholm
16:00 CEST (UTC+2)		Report	Björck (yellow card) 8'; Omotoyossi 38'	Stadium: Råsunda Stadion; Attendance: 17,233; Referee: Markus Strömbergsson

12 May 2007 6	Brommapojkarna	0–2	AIK	Stockholm
16:00 CEST (UTC+2)	Ekström (yellow card) 35'	Report	Jonsson 33'; Tjernström (yellow card) 90'; Figueiredo 91'	Stadium: Stockholm Olympic Stadium; Attendance: 6,051; Referee: Stefan Johannesson

21 May 2007 7	AIK	1–1	Halmstad	Stockholm
19:00 CEST (UTC+2)	Jonsson 35' (pen.); Carlsson (yellow card) 59'; Persson (yellow card) 89'	Report	Larsson (yellow card) 49'; Fribrock 51'	Stadium: Råsunda Stadion; Attendance: 14,141; Referee: Håkan Jonasson

28 May 2007 8	Djurgården	3–1	AIK	Stockholm
20:00 CEST (UTC+2)	Johannesson (yellow card) 15'; Sjölund 34', 36'; Enrico 90'	Report	Mendes 9'; Figueiredo (yellow card) 38'	Stadium: Råsunda Stadium; Attendance: 32,529; Referee: Peter Fröjdfeldt

10 June 2007 9	AIK	1–1	Örebro	Stockholm
17:00 CEST (UTC+2)	Figueiredo (yellow card) 16'; Jonsson 30' (pen.); Persson (yellow card) 34'; Carlsson (yellow card) 43'	Report	Riddez (yellow card) 44'; Rodevåg 46'	Stadium: Råsunda Stadion; Attendance: 14,251; Referee: Åke Andreasson

18 June 2007 10	Gefle	0–0	AIK	Gävle
19:00 CEST (UTC+2)		Report	Jonsson (yellow card) 40'; Arnefjord (yellow card) 58'; Mendes (yellow card) 77'	Stadium: Strömvallen; Attendance: 6,767; Referee: Martin Hansson

25 June 2007 11	GAIS	1–1	AIK	Gothenburg
19:00 CEST (UTC+2)	Tobiasson 8'	Report	Carlsson 14'; Figueiredo (yellow card) 22'; Persson (yellow card) 76'	Stadium: Ullevi; Attendance: 6,125; Referee: Jonas Eriksson

3 July 2007 12	AIK	2–0	Trelleborg	Stockholm
19:00 CEST (UTC+2)	Johansson (yellow card) 43'; Arnefjord (yellow card) 64'; Obolo 70'; Pavey 75'	Report	Bengtsson (yellow card) 67'; Mensah (yellow card) 90+4'	Stadium: Råsunda Stadion; Attendance: 16,873; Referee: Markus Strömbergsson

9 July 2007 13	AIK	0–1	Elfsborg	Stockholm
17:00 CEST (UTC+2)	Valdemarín (yellow card) 30'	Report	Ishizaki (yellow card) 24' (goal) 61'; Keene (yellow card) 70'; Mobaeck (yellow card) 74'	Stadium: Råsunda Stadion; Attendance: 18,660; Referee: Martin Ingvarsson

12 July 2007 14	Elfsborg	2–0	AIK	Borås
19:00 CEST (UTC+2)	Keene 32'; M. Svensson 50'	Report	Arnefjord (yellow card) 48'	Stadium: Borås Arena; Attendance: 15,682; Referee: Peter Fröjdfeldt

23 July 2007 15	Helsingborg	2–3	AIK	Helsingborg
19:00 CEST (UTC+2)	Larsson 20' (pen.); Rönningberg (yellow card) 81'; Jakobsson 90'	Report	Obolo 33'; Figueiredo 44'; Valdemarín 86'	Stadium: Olympia; Attendance: 13,581; Referee: Jonas Eriksson

6 August 2007 16	AIK	3–0	Brommapojkarna	Stockholm
19:00 CEST (UTC+2)	Pavey (yellow card) 10'; Johnson 16'; Obolo 44'; Valdemarín 71'	Report	Asp (yellow card) 59'	Stadium: Råsunda Stadion; Attendance: 17,315; Referee: Markus Strömbergsson

12 August 2007 17	AIK	1–0	Gefle	Stockholm
17:00 CEST (UTC+2)	Pa.Karlsson 28'; Obolo (yellow card) 68'	Report	Westlin (yellow card) 28'	Stadium: Råsunda Stadion; Attendance: 15,776; Referee: Daniel Stålhammar

19 August 2007 18	Örebro	1–4	AIK	Örebro
17:00 CEST (UTC+2)	Rodevåg 90'	Report	Figueiredo 8'; Obolo 16'; Stephenson 41'; Tamandi (yellow card) 71' (goal) 76'	Stadium: Behrn Arena; Attendance: 10,593; Referee: Daniel Stålhammar

26 August 2007 19	AIK	3–1	Malmö	Stockholm
17:00 CEST (UTC+2)	Figueiredo 6', 65'; Pavey 11'; Carlsson (yellow card) 42'; Johnson (yellow card) 45'	Report	Dixon (yellow card) 45'; Järdler (yellow card) 53'; Johansson (yellow card) 68'; Toivonen 89'	Stadium: Råsunda Stadion; Attendance: 23,212; Referee: Markus Strömbergsson

3 September 2007 20	Hammarby	1–2	AIK	Stockholm
20:00 CEST (UTC+2)	Laitinen (yellow card) 10'; Eguren 19'; Eguren (yellow card) 29'; Sleyman (yellow card) 43'	Report	Figueiredo (yellow card) 38'; Valdemarín 48', 61'	Stadium: Råsunda Stadion; Attendance: 25,870; Referee: Martin Ingvarsson

16 September 2007 21	Halmstad	2–2	AIK	Halmstad
18:00 CEST (UTC+2)	Jönsson 21'; Mattisson (yellow card) 27'; Kujović 69'	Report	Tamandi 6' (yellow card) 66'; Tjernström (yellow card) 20'; Pavey (yellow card) 53'; Arnefjord (yellow card) 77' (yellow-red card) 81'; Obolo 78'	Stadium: Örjans Vall; Attendance: 6,046; Referee: Peter Fröjdfeldt

24 September 2007 22	AIK	1–1	Djurgården	Stockholm
20:00 CEST (UTC+2)	Obolo (yellow card) 63'; Valdemarín 74' (yellow card) 79'; Tamandi (yellow card) 76'; Carlsson (yellow card) 79'	Report	Komac (yellow card) 9'; Davids (yellow card) 11'; Arneng (yellow card) 14' Quirino 58'	Stadium: Råsunda Stadion; Attendance: 34,116; Referee: Martin Hansson

30 September 2007 23	AIK	0–0	GAIS	Stockholm
17:00 CEST (UTC+2)	Johnson (yellow card) 11'	Report	Héðinsson (yellow card) 79'; Lundén (yellow card) 90+6'	Stadium: Råsunda Stadion; Attendance: 19,410; Referee: Peter Fröjdfeldt

7 October 2007 24	Trelleborg	0–0	AIK	Trelleborg
15:00 CEST (UTC+2)	Melander (yellow card) 37'	Report	Monsalvo (yellow card) 16'; Pavey (red card) 55'; Obolo (yellow card) 87'	Stadium: Vångavallen; Attendance: 2,620; Referee: Martin Hansson

22 October 2007 25	AIK	0–1	IFK Göteborg	Stockholm
19:00 CEST (UTC+2)	Arnefjord (yellow card) 42'; Valdemarín (yellow card) 56'; Rubarth (yellow card) 65'; Johansson (yellow card) 88'	Report	Bjärsmyr 19'; Johansson (yellow card) 24'; Wernbloom (yellow card) 41'; Olsson (yellow card) 64'	Stadium: Råsunda Stadion; Attendance: 18,407; Referee: Martin Ingvarsson

28 October 2007 26	Kalmar	2–0	AIK	Kalmar
15:00 CET (UTC+1)	Eklund (yellow card) 18'; Ingelsten 49'; Santín 75'	Report	Arnefjord (yellow card) 21' (yellow-red card) 43'	Stadium: Fredriksskans; Attendance: 9,423; Referee: Peter Fröjdfeldt

=== Svenska Cupen ===
1 May 2007 Second Round	Enköping	0–1	AIK	Enköping
15:00 CEST (UTC+2)	Lindberg (yellow card) 10'; Gussev (yellow card) 18'; Mytin (yellow card) 72'	Report	Tamandi (yellow card) 24'; Figueiredo 81'	Stadium: Enavallen; Attendance: 2,047; Referee: Patrik Berglund

24 May 2007 Third Round	IFK Norrköping	1–0	AIK	Norrköping
19:00 CEST (UTC+2)	Hellman (yellow card) 33'; Gunnlaugsson 71'; Nordbeck (yellow card) 74'	Report	Jonsson (yellow card) 36'; Rubarth (yellow card) 39'; Bengtsson (yellow card) 67'; Persson (yellow card) 83'	Stadium: Nya Parken; Attendance: 5,282; Referee: Stefan Johannesson

=== UEFA Cup ===
19 July 2007 First qualifying round 1st leg	Glentoran (Northern Ireland)	0–5	(Sweden) AIK	Belfast, Northern Ireland
19:45 CEST (UTC+2)	Carson (yellow card) 72'	Report	Figueiredo 21', 62' (yellow card) 47'; Arnefjord (yellow card) 49'; Valdemarín 68'; Stephenson 73'; Johnson 84'	Stadium: The Oval; Attendance: 2,033; Referee: Andrejs Sipailo (Latvia)

2 August 2007 First qualifying round 2nd leg	AIK (Sweden)	4–0 (9–0 agg.)	(Northern Ireland) Glentoran	Stockholm, Sweden
19:45 CEST (UTC+2)	Özkan 27'; Karlsson 24'; Gerndt 88'; Johnson 89'	Report	Carson (yellow card) 56'	Stadium: Råsunda Stadion; Attendance: 8,707; Referee: René Rogalla (Switzerland)

16 August 2007 Second qualifying round 1st leg	Liepājas Metalurg (Latvia)	3–2	(Sweden) AIK	Liepāja, Latvia
19:45 CEST (UTC+2)	Karlsons 20'; Ivanovs 43'; Tamošauskas 63'; Surņins (yellow card) 85'	Report	Karlsson (yellow card) 17'; Valdemarín (yellow card) 34'; Arnefjord (yellow card) 42'; Ivanovs 49' (o.g.); Obolo 61' (yellow card) 86'; Özkan (yellow card) 67'	Stadium: Daugava Stadium; Attendance: 3,100; Referee: Tsvetan Georgiev (Bulgaria)

30 August 2007 Second qualifying round 2nd leg	AIK (Sweden)	2–0 (4–3 agg.)	(Latvia) Liepājas Metalurg	Stockholm, Sweden
18:30 CEST (UTC+2)	Figueiredo 43', 54'	Report	Kļava (yellow card) 31'; Karlsons (yellow card) 69'; Zirnis (yellow card) 75'	Stadium: Råsunda Stadion; Attendance: 7,528; Referee: Ceri Richards (Wales)

20 September 2007 First round 1st leg	Hapoel Tel Aviv (Israel)	0–0	(Sweden) AIK	Tel Aviv, Israel
20:50 CEST (UTC+2)		Report		Stadium: Bloomfield Stadium; Attendance: 9,000; Referee: Stanislav Sukhina (Russia)

4 October 2007 First round 2nd leg	AIK (Sweden)	0–1 (0–1 agg.)	(Israel) Hapoel Tel Aviv	Stockholm, Sweden
20:30 CEST (UTC+2)	Pavey (yellow card) 45'; Jonsson (yellow card) 75'	Report	Oved (yellow card) 41' (goal) 64'; Badir (yellow card) 44'; Mazuwa (yellow card) 60'	Stadium: Råsunda Stadion; Attendance: 9,082; Referee: Rob Styles (England)

== Squad statistics ==
As of match played 28 October 2007

=== Appearances and goals ===
No.	Pos	Nat	Player	Total		Allsvenskan		Svenska Cupen		UEFA Cup	
No.	Pos	Nat	Player	Apps	Goals	Apps	Goals	Apps	Goals	Apps	Goals
1	GK	(Sweden) SWE	Daniel Örlund	31	0	26	0	0	0	5	0
2	DF	(Sweden) SWE	Patrik Karlsson	27	2	17+4	1	2	0	3+1	1
4	DF	(Sweden) SWE	Nils-Eric Johansson	20	0	15	0	0	0	5	0
5	DF	(Norway) NOR	Per Rønning	4	0	3	0	1	0	0	0
7	MF	(Argentina) ARG	Pablo Monsalvo	8	0	4+2	0	0	0	2	0
8	MF	(Sweden) SWE	Daniel Tjernström	28	0	21+2	0	0	0	5	0
9	FW	(Slovenia) SVN	Miran Burgić	7	1	4+2	1	0+1	0	0	0
13	DF	(Sweden) SWE	Daniel Arnefjord	23	0	15+1	0	2	0	5	0
14	MF	(England) ENG	Kenny Pavey	28	2	16+5	2	1	0	5+1	0
15	MF	(Sweden) SWE	Kevin Walker	2	0	0+2	0	0	0	0	0
16	DF	(Sweden) SWE	Pierre Bengtsson	12	0	2+4	0	1+1	0	0+4	0
17	DF	(Sweden) SWE	Jimmy Tamandi	28	2	21+1	2	1	0	5	0
18	DF	(Sweden) SWE	Markus Jonsson	24	3	13+5	3	1+1	0	4	0
20	MF	(Jamaica) JAM	Khari Stephenson	24	2	14+4	1	0	0	5+1	1
21	FW	(Sweden) SWE	Alexander Gerndt	7	1	2+3	0	1	0	0+1	1
22	GK	(Sweden) SWE	Niklas Westberg	3	0	0	0	2	0	1	0
23	MF	(Sweden) SWE	Mats Rubarth	12	0	6+4	0	1	0	0+1	0
24	DF	(Sweden) SWE	Nicklas Carlsson	19	1	15+2	1	1	0	1	0
26	FW	(Brazil) BRA	Daniel Mendes	25	2	7+11	2	2	0	0+5	0
27	FW	(Argentina) ARG	Iván Obolo	19	6	14	5	0	0	5	1
28	FW	(Argentina) ARG	Lucas Valdemarín	20	6	9+5	5	0	0	4+2	1
29	MF	(Sweden) SWE	Gabriel Özkan	10	1	4+4	0	0	0	2	1
30	MF	(Liberia) LBR	Dulee Johnson	33	3	25	1	2	0	6	2
Players away on loan:
11	FW	(Norway) NOR	Bernt Hulsker	7	0	3+3	0	1	0	0	0
Players who appeared for AIK but left during the season:
3	DF	(Sweden) SWE	Niklas Sandberg	9	0	8	0	0+1	0	0	0
7	MF	(Sweden) SWE	Kristian Haynes	6	0	2+3	0	0+1	0	0	0
10	FW	(Brazil) BRA	Wílton Figueiredo	24	11	17+1	6	1+1	1	3+1	4
19	MF	(Sweden) SWE	Robert Persson	10	0	3+5	0	2	0	0	0

=== Goal scorers ===
Place	Position	Nation	Number	Name	Allsvenskan	Svenska Cupen	UEFA Cup	Total
1	FW	(Brazil)	10	Wílton Figueiredo	6	1	4	11
2	FW	(Argentina)	28	Lucas Valdemarín	5	0	1	6
2	FW	(Argentina)	27	Iván Obolo	5	0	1	6
4	DF	(Sweden)	18	Markus Jonsson	3	0	0	3
4	MF	(Liberia)	30	Dulee Johnson	1	0	2	3
6	FW	(Brazil)	26	Daniel Mendes	2	0	0	2
6	MF	(England)	14	Kenny Pavey	2	0	0	2
6	DF	(Sweden)	17	Jimmy Tamandi	2	0	0	2
6	MF	(Jamaica)	20	Khari Stephenson	1	0	1	2
6	DF	(Sweden)	2	Patrik Karlsson	1	0	1	2
11	FW	(Slovenia)	9	Miran Burgić	1	0	0	1
11	DF	(Sweden)	24	Nicklas Carlsson	1	0	0	1
11	MF	(Sweden)	29	Gabriel Özkan	0	0	1	1
11	FW	(Sweden)	21	Alexander Gerndt	0	0	1	1
11				Own goal	0	0	1	1
TOTALS					30	1	13	44

=== Clean sheets ===
Place	Position	Nation	Number	Name	Allsvenskan	Svenska Cupen	UEFA Cup	Total
1	GK	(Sweden)	1	Daniel Örlund	8	0	4	12
2	GK	(Sweden)	22	Niklas Westberg	0	1	0	1
TOTALS					8	1	4	13

=== Disciplinary record ===
Number	Nation	Position	Name	Allsvenskan		Svenska Cupen		UEFA Cup		Total	
Number	Nation	Position	Name	Booked	Sent off (straight red)	Booked	Sent off (straight red)	Booked	Sent off (straight red)	Booked	Sent off (straight red)
2	(Sweden)	DF	Patrik Karlsson	0	0	0	0	1	0	1	0
4	(Sweden)	DF	Nils-Eric Johansson	2	0	0	0	0	0	2	0
5	(Norway)	DF	Per Rønning	1	0	0	0	0	0	1	0
7	(Argentina)	MF	Pablo Monsalvo	1	0	0	0	0	0	1	0
8	(Sweden)	MF	Daniel Tjernström	2	0	0	0	0	0	2	0
13	(Sweden)	DF	Daniel Arnefjord	8	2	0	0	2	0	10	2
14	(England)	MF	Kenny Pavey	3	1	0	0	1	0	4	1
16	(Sweden)	DF	Pierre Bengtsson	0	0	1	0	0	0	1	0
17	(Sweden)	DF	Jimmy Tamandi	3	0	1	0	0	0	4	0
18	(Sweden)	DF	Markus Jonsson	1	0	1	0	1	0	3	0
23	(Sweden)	MF	Mats Rubarth	2	0	1	0	0	0	3	0
24	(Sweden)	DF	Nicklas Carlsson	4	0	0	0	0	0	4	0
26	(Brazil)	FW	Daniel Mendes	2	0	0	0	0	0	2	0
27	(Argentina)	FW	Iván Obolo	3	0	0	0	1	0	4	0
28	(Argentina)	FW	Lucas Valdemarín	3	0	0	0	1	0	4	0
29	(Sweden)	MF	Gabriel Özkan	0	0	0	0	1	0	1	0
30	(Liberia)	MF	Dulee Johnson	3	0	0	0	0	0	3	0
Players away on loan:
11	(Norway)	FW	Bernt Hulsker	2	0	0	0	0	0	2	0
Players who left AIK during the season:
10	(Brazil)	FW	Wílton Figueiredo	5	0	0	0	1	0	6	0
19	(Sweden)	MF	Robert Persson	3	0	1	0	0	0	4	0
Total				48	3	5	0	9	0	62	3
