= 2009 AIK Fotboll season =

AIK
2009 season
- Manager: Mikael Stahre
- Stadium: Råsunda Stadium
- Allsvenskan: Champions
- Svenska Cupen: Champions
- Top goalscorer: League: Iván Obolo (9); All: Iván Obolo (13)
- Highest home attendance: 26,241 vs Djurgården (28 September 2009)
- Lowest home attendance: 8,117 vs BK Häcken (6 September 2009)
- Average home league attendance: 17,436 (Allsvenskan - 28 October 2009); 16,853 (All competitions - 28 October 2009)

AIK had a sensational season, winning 14 league matches by the odd goal, to claim their first domestic title since 1998, also winning the cup final against IFK Göteborg, also title rivals in the league, which was decided in a straight run-in between the two candidates. There, AIK turned around a 1–0 deficit to win 2–1 and claim the title, more than enough, considering a draw had landed the title as well. Key players in the title success included goalkeeper Daniel Örlund, conceding just 20 goals all season, plus new defensive general Jos Hooiveld, midfielder Jorge Ortiz and striker Iván Obolo, all of them departing following the title success.

== Season events ==
After injuries to both Tomi Maanoja and Nicklas Bergh, AIK announced the loan signing of Milos Petkovic from Vasalund until 30 June.

On 14 June, AIK announced the return of Dulee Johnson on a two-and-a-half-year contract from Maccabi Tel Aviv.

On 24 July, AIK announced the loan signing of Niklas Backman from Väsby United for the remainder of the season.

On 1 August, AIK announced the signing of Antônio Flávio from Santo André.

== Squad ==
As of match played 7 November 2009

No.	Name	Nationality	Position	Date of birth (age)	Signed from	Signed in	Contract ends	Apps.	Goals
Goalkeepers
12	Tomi Maanoja	(Finland)	GK	12 September 1986 (aged 23)	Honka	2008	2011	12	0
13	Niklas Rönn	(Sweden)	GK	23 June 1989 (aged 20)	Academy	2007			
22	Nicklas Bergh	(Sweden)	GK	6 September 1982 (aged 27)	Eskilstuna City	2005		10	0
27	Daniel Örlund	(Sweden)	GK	23 June 1980 (aged 29)	Spårvägens	2002			
76	Lee Baxter	(Sweden)	GK	17 June 1976 (aged 33)	Landskrona BoIS	2008			
Defenders
2	Niklas Backman	(Sweden)	DF	13 November 1988 (aged 20)	on loan from Väsby United	2009	2009	0	0
3	Per Karlsson	(Sweden)	DF	2 January 1986 (aged 23)	Academy	2003			
4	Nils-Eric Johansson	(Sweden)	DF	13 January 1980 (aged 29)	Leicester City	2007	2010	83	5
6	Walid Atta	(Sweden)	DF	28 August 1986 (aged 23)	Väsby United	2008		21	0
18	Markus Jonsson	(Sweden)	DF	9 March 1981 (aged 28)	Öster	2006		99	16
20	Jos Hooiveld	(Netherlands)	DF	22 April 1983 (aged 26)	Inter Turku	2009		31	1
Midfielders
5	Jorge Ortiz	(Argentina)	MF	20 June 1984 (aged 25)	San Lorenzo	2008		59	1
7	Bojan Djordjic	(Sweden)	MF	6 February 1982 (aged 27)	Plymouth Argyle	2008		36	1
8	Daniel Tjernström	(Sweden)	MF	19 February 1974 (aged 35)	Örebro SK	1999			
14	Kenny Pavey	(England)	MF	23 August 1979 (aged 30)	Ljungskile	2006		92	10
15	Kevin Walker	(Sweden)	MF	3 August 1989 (aged 20)	Örebro	2007		14	0
25	Yussuf Saleh	(Sweden)	MF	22 March 1984 (aged 25)	Vasalund	2008		16	0
29	Gabriel Özkan	(Sweden)	MF	23 May 1986 (aged 23)	IF Brommapojkarna	2006		47	7
30	Dulee Johnson	(Liberia)	MF	7 November 1984 (aged 25)	Maccabi Tel Aviv	2009	2011	92	6
Forwards
9	Miran Burgić	(Slovenia)	FW	25 September 1984 (aged 25)	Gorica	2006		54	11
10	Iván Obolo	(Argentina)	FW	28 September 1981 (aged 28)	Arsenal de Sarandí	2007	2010	84	29
11	Antônio Flávio	(Brazil)	FW	5 January 1987 (aged 22)	Santo André	2009		15	6
17	Saihou Jagne	(The Gambia)	FW	10 October 1986 (aged 23)	Väsby United	2008		39	7
19	Martin Kayongo-Mutumba	(Sweden)	FW	15 June 1985 (aged 24)	Väsby United	2009		29	4
21	Mikael Thorstensson	(Sweden)	FW	25 January 1985 (aged 24)	Väsby United	2009		14	0
Out on loan
24	Daniel Gustavsson	(Sweden)	MF	29 August 1990 (aged 19)	Västerås SK	2009		1	0
26	Pontus Engblom	(Sweden)	FW	3 November 1991 (aged 18)	IFK Sundsvall	2009		2	0
28	Viktor Lundberg	(Sweden)	FW	4 March 1991 (aged 18)	Väsby United	2009		7	2
	Sotirios Papagiannopoulos	(Sweden)	DF	5 September 1990 (aged 19)	Academy	2008		0	0
Left during the season
2	Patrik Bojent	(Sweden)	DF	26 December 1980 (aged 28)	Gefle	2007	2009	41	2
13	Milos Petkovic	(Serbia)	GK	14 December 1979 (aged 29)	on loan from Vasalund	2009	2009	0	0
16	Pierre Bengtsson	(Sweden)	DF	12 April 1988 (aged 21)	Academy	2006		35	0

== Transfers ==
=== In ===
Date	Position	Nationality	Name	From	Fee	Ref.
1 January 2009	DF	(Netherlands)	Jos Hooiveld	Inter Turku	Undisclosed	
1 January 2009	MF	(Sweden)	Daniel Gustavsson	Västerås	Undisclosed	
1 January 2009	MF	(Sweden)	Viktor Lundberg	Väsby United	Undisclosed	
1 January 2009	FW	(Sweden)	Pontus Engblom	IFK Sundsvall	Undisclosed	
1 January 2009	FW	(Sweden)	Martin Kayongo-Mutumba	Väsby United	Undisclosed	
1 January 2009	FW	(Sweden)	Mikael Thorstensson	Väsby United	Undisclosed	
1 March 2009	DF	(Sweden)	Sebastian Hansen	IF Brommapojkarna	Undisclosed	
14 June 2009	MF	(Liberia)	Dulee Johnson	Maccabi Tel Aviv	Undisclosed	
1 August 2009	FW	(Brazil)	Antônio Flávio	Santo André	Undisclosed	

=== Loans in ===
Start date	Position	Nationality	Name	From	End date	Ref.
1 March 2009	GK	(Serbia)	Milos Petkovic	Vasalund	30 June 2009	
24 July 2009	DF	(Sweden)	Niklas Backman	Väsby United	31 December 2009	

=== Out ===
Date	Position	Nationality	Name	To	Fee	Ref.
1 January 2009	MF	(Sweden)	Magnus Eriksson	Väsby United	Undisclosed	
1 January 2009	FW	(Brazil)	Daniel Mendes	Kalmar FF	Undisclosed	
28 July 2009	DF	(Sweden)	Patrik Bojent	Öster	Undisclosed	
1 September 2009	DF	(Sweden)	Pierre Bengtsson	Nordsjælland	Undisclosed	

=== Loans out ===
Start date	Position	Nationality	Name	To	End date	Ref.
1 January 2009	DF	(Sweden)	Sotirios Papagiannopoulos	Väsby United		
1 January 2009	MF	(Sweden)	Daniel Gustavsson	Väsby United		
1 January 2009	MF	(Sweden)	Pontus Engblom	Väsby United	1 August 2009	
1 September 2009	FW	(Sweden)	Pontus Engblom	Västerås	30 November 2009	
24 July 2009	MF	(Sweden)	Daniel Gustavsson	Västerås		
24 July 2009	MF	(Sweden)	Viktor Lundberg	Väsby United		

=== Released ===
Date	Position	Nationality	Name	Joined	Date	Ref
31 December 2009	GK	(Sweden)	Niklas Rönn	Väsby United		
31 December 2009	DF	(Sweden)	Markus Jonsson	Panionios		
31 December 2009	FW	(Argentina)	Iván Obolo	Arsenal de Sarandí		
31 December 2009	FW	(Sweden)	Mikael Thorstensson	Assyriska		

=== Trial ===
Date from	Position	Nationality	Name	Last club	Date to	Ref
Winter 2009	MF	(Finland)	Toni Koskela	Molde		
9 March 2009	FW	(Argentina)	Rodrigo Soria	Defensa y Justicia		

== Friendlies ==
7 February 2009	AIK	1–0	IFK Mariehamn	Stockholm
14:00 CET (UTC+1)	Burgić 29'	Report	Arajuuri (yellow card) 35'; Carlsson (yellow card) 59'	Stadium: Skytteholms IP; Attendance: 3,092; Referee: Jonas Eriksson

14 February 2009	Västerås	2–4	AIK	Västerås
13:00 CET (UTC+1)	Damianovici (yellow card); Lundevall 20'; Berhane 37'	Report	Jagne (yellow card); Obolo 27'; Thorstensson 32'; Pavey 40'; Johansson 44'	Stadium: Iver Arena; Attendance: 2,011; Referee: Mohammed Al-Hakim

17 February 2009	AIK	3–1	Syrianska	Stockholm
19:00 CET (UTC+1)	Burgić 15' (yellow card) 66'; Saleh 26' (pen.) (yellow card) 39' (yellow-red card) 74'; Pavey (yellow card) 36'; Engblom 87'	Report	Skenderović (yellow card) 34'; Velić 40' (pen.); Guglielmotti (yellow card) 67'; Zatara (yellow card) 69'	Stadium: Skytteholms IP; Attendance: 1,193; Referee: Markus Strömbergsson

21 February 2009	AIK	3–1	Örebro	Stockholm
14:00 CET (UTC+1)	Burgić 20'; Johansson (yellow card) 40'; Özkan 48'; Hooiveld (yellow card) 59' (yellow-red card) 82'; Obolo 78'; Atta (yellow card) 81'	Report	Nordback (yellow card) 43'; Gerzić (yellow card) 75'; Kihlberg (yellow card) 82'; Bassombeng 85'	Stadium: Skytteholms IP; Attendance: 2,013; Referee: Johan Hamlin

28 February 2009	AIK	0–0	Assyriska	Stockholm
14:00 CET (UTC+1)		Report	Bergman (yellow card) (yellow-red card) 50'	Stadium: Skytteholms IP; Attendance: 1,989; Referee: Magnus Ahlsén

4 March 2009	AIK	3–0	Enköpings SK	Stockholm
19:00 CET (UTC+1)	Saleh 43'; Gustavsson (penalty missed) 76' 90+2'; Eriksson 86'	Report		Stadium: Skytteholms IP; Attendance: 853; Referee: Keijo Hyvärinen

7 March 2009	AIK	0–0	TPS	Stockholm
14:00 CET (UTC+1)	Johansson (yellow card) 38'	Report	Booked	Stadium: Skytteholms IP; Attendance: 1,623; Referee: Johan Hamlin

12 March 2009	AIK	1–1	Vasalund	Stockholm
18:00 CET (UTC+1)	Marah (yellow card) 42'; Yasar (yellow card) 48'; Varnava 66'; Sten (yellow card) 42'; Sacko (yellow card) 90'	Report	Soria 79'	Stadium: Skytteholms IP; Attendance: 570; Referee: Andreas Ekberg

17 March 2009	AIK	1–0	Spartak Vladikavkaz	Málaga, Spain
16:30 CET (UTC+1)	Kayongo-Mutumba (yellow card); Obolo 80'	Report	Booked

28 March 2009	AIK	4–1	GIF Sundsvall	Stockholm
13:00 CEST (UTC+2)	Kayongo-Mutumba 22'; Obolo 32', 50'; 55' (o.g.)	Report	Myrestam 41'	Stadium: Råsunda Stadion; Attendance: 1,732; Referee: Johan Hamlin

9 April 2009	AIK	3–1	Akropolis	Stockholm
13:30 CEST (UTC+2)	Engblom 12', 90' (yellow card) 58'; Bojent 72'	Report	Aloui (yellow card) 7' (yellow-red card) 26'; Kocak 55'	Stadium: Skytteholms IP; Attendance: 200

17 June 2009 Veterans Match	BKV Norrtälje	0–1	AIK	Norrtälje
18:00 CET (UTC+1)		Report	Mattiasson 43'	Stadium: Norrtälje IP; Attendance: 1,193

17 June 2009	AIK	0–2	Inter Turku	Norrtälje
19:30 CET (UTC+1)	Pavey (yellow card) 27'; Djordjic (yellow card) 61'	Report	Nyman (yellow card) 58'; Purje 82'; Furuholm 86'	Stadium: Norrtälje IP; Attendance: 1,193; Referee: Jim Pettersson

27 June 2009	IFK Norrköping	1–1	AIK	Hallstavik
13:00 CET (UTC+1)	Dybendal (yellow card) 36'; Nyman 90+1'	Report	Obolo (penalty missed) 2'; Jagne 17'; Ortiz (yellow card) 64'	Stadium: IP Hallstavik; Attendance: 922

12 August 2009	Akropolis	0–2	AIK	Stockholm
18:30 CET (UTC+1)	Pettersson (yellow card) 20'; Mavroidis (yellow card) 39'	Report	Engblom 59'; Thorstensson 65'	Stadium: Akalla Gårds Bollplan; Attendance: 650; Referee: Jonas Schenning

1 September 2009	Gröndals	0–0	AIK	Stockholm
18:00 CET (UTC+1)	Motas (yellow card) 21'	Report		Stadium: Aspuddens IP; Attendance: 507; Referee: Mikael Gudmundsson

== Competitions ==
=== Overview ===
Competition	First match	Last match	Starting round	Final position	Record							
Competition	First match	Last match	Starting round	Final position	Pld	W	D	L	GF	GA	GD	Win %
Allsvenskan	5 April 2009	1 November 2009	Matchday 1	Winners	30	18	7	5	36	20	+16	60.00
Svenska Cupen	26 April 2009	7 November 2009	Third round	Winners	5	5	0	0	10	4	+6	100.00
Total					35	23	7	5	46	24	+22	65.71

Last updated: 7 November 2009
Source: Competitions

=== Allsvenskan ===
==== League table ====
Pos	Team	Pld	W	D	L	GF	GA	GD	Pts	Qualification or relegation
1	AIK (C)	30	18	7	5	36	20	+16	61	Qualification to Champions League second qualifying round
2	IFK Göteborg	30	17	6	7	53	24	+29	57	Qualification to Europa League third qualifying round (Note: IFK Göteborg qualified for the Third qualifying round of the Europa League as Svenska Cupen champions 2009.)
3	IF Elfsborg	30	15	10	5	43	34	+9	55	Qualification to Europa League second qualifying round (Note: Elfsborg qualified for the Second qualifying round of the Europa League as they received IFK Göteborg's initial qualifying spot.)
4	Kalmar FF	30	14	8	8	53	39	+14	50	Qualification to Europa League first qualifying round (Note: Kalmar FF qualified for the Europa League as they received Elfsborgs initial qualifying spot.)
5	BK Häcken	30	13	9	8	43	30	+13	48	

Source: svenskfotboll.se (in Swedish)
Rules for classification: 1) points; 2) goal difference; 3) number of goals scored.
(C) Champions

==== Results summary ====
Overall								Home						Away					
Pld	W	D	L	GF	GA	GD	Pts	W	D	L	GF	GA	GD	W	D	L	GF	GA	GD
30	18	7	5	36	20	+16	61	10	3	2	17	7	+10	8	4	3	19	13	+6

Last updated: 1 November 2009.
Source: Results

==== Results by matchday ====
Matchday	1	2	3	4	5	6	7	8	9	10	11	12	13	14	15	16	17	18	19	20	21	22	23	24	25	26	27	28	29	30
Ground	H	A	H	A	A	H	A	H	A	H	A	H	A	H	A	H	A	H	A	H	H	A	H	A	H	A	H	A	H	A
Result	W	W	L	W	W	L	L	W	W	D	L	W	D	W	D	W	D	W	W	D	W	W	W	L	W	D	W	W	D	W
Position																														

Updated to match(es) played on 1 November 2009. Source: Results
A = Away; H = Home; W = Win; D = Draw; L = Loss; P = Postponed

==== Results ====
5 April 2009 1	AIK	1–0	Halmstad	Stockholm
15:00 CEST (UTC+2)	Örlund (yellow card) 16'; Özkan 55' (yellow card) 55'	Report	Olsson (yellow card) 16'; Järdler (yellow card) 46'; Salomonsson (yellow card) 59'	Stadium: Råsunda Stadion; Attendance: 21,867; Referee: Martin Hansson

13 April 2009 2	Kalmar FF	0–1	AIK	Kalmar
20:00 CEST (UTC+2)	Lindberg (yellow card) 78'	Report	Obolo 12'; Hooiveld (yellow card) 76'; Thorstensson (yellow card) 77'; Bengtsson (yellow card) 83'	Stadium: Fredriksskans; Attendance: 6,042; Referee: Martin Ingvarsson

16 April 2009 3	AIK	0–1	Malmö FF	Stockholm
19:00 CEST (UTC+2)	Ortiz (yellow card) 37'	Report	Ofere (yellow card) 23'; Larsson (yellow card) 50'; Mehmeti 74'; Andersson (yellow card) 89'	Stadium: Råsunda Stadion; Attendance: 16,936; Referee: Jonas Eriksson

19 April 2009 4	Brommapojkarna	2–3	AIK	Stockholm
12:30 CEST (UTC+2)	Guterstam 8'; Chhadeh 21'; Karlsson (yellow card) 58'; Odelius (red card) 90+2'	Report	Lundberg 2'; Obolo 31'; Jagne 90+2'	Stadium: Grimsta IP; Attendance: 6,755; Referee: Martin Hansson

23 April 2009 5	Örgryte	0–1	AIK	Gothenburg
19:00 CEST (UTC+2)	Jonsson (yellow card) 37'; Leinar (yellow card) 90+3'	Report	Obolo 30'; Atta (yellow card) 47'; Ortiz (yellow card) 90+3'; Bengtsson (yellow card) 90+4'	Stadium: Gamla Ullevi; Attendance: 3,540; Referee: Åke Andreasson

29 April 2009 6	AIK	0–3	Helsingborg	Stockholm
20:00 CEST (UTC+2)	Pavey (yellow card) 22'; Johansson (yellow card) 43'	Report	Jönsson 15', 53', 78'; Nilsson (yellow card) 42'	Stadium: Råsunda Stadion; Attendance: 14,386; Referee: Michael Lerjéus

5 May 2009 7	Trelleborg	1–0	AIK	Trelleborg
19:00 CEST (UTC+2)	Drugge 56' (yellow card) 56'	Report	Bojent (yellow card) 27'; Djordjic (yellow card) 62'; Obolo (yellow card) 63'; Kayongo-Mutumba (yellow card) 90+3'	Stadium: Vångavallen; Attendance: 2,495; Referee: Johan Hamlin

9 May 2009 8	AIK	2–0	BK Häcken	Stockholm
16:00 CEST (UTC+2)	Jagne 38'; Pavey 42' (yellow card) 53'	Report		Stadium: Råsunda Stadion; Attendance: 10,288; Referee: Daniel Stålhammar

18 May 2009 9	Djurgården	0–1	AIK	Stockholm
20:00 CEST (UTC+2)	Komac (yellow card) 49'; Magnusson (yellow card) 72'; Rajalakso (yellow card) 77'	Report	Obolo 8' (yellow card) 84'; Hooiveld (yellow card) 27'; Tjernström (yellow card) 71'; Ortiz (yellow card) 74'	Stadium: Råsunda Stadium; Attendance: 21,884; Referee: Martin Hansson

21 May 2009 10	AIK	0–0	Elfsborg	Stockholm
17:00 CEST (UTC+2)	Bengtsson (yellow card) 86'	Report		Stadium: Råsunda Stadion; Attendance: 14,637; Referee: Martin Ingvarsson

25 May 2009 11	Gefle	1–0	AIK	Gävle
19:00 CEST (UTC+2)	Berggren 45'	Report	Hooiveld (yellow card) 76'	Stadium: Strömvallen; Attendance: 6,973; Referee: Stefan Johannesson

28 May 2009 12	AIK	1–0	Hammarby	Stockholm
20:00 CEST (UTC+2)	Jagne 45+1'; Pavey (yellow card) 84'; Ortiz (yellow card) 90+4'	Report	Törnstrand (yellow card) 16'; Jensen (yellow card) 25'; Moggia (yellow card) 82'	Stadium: Råsunda Stadion; Attendance: 22,973; Referee: Jonas Eriksson

5 July 2009 13	Örebro	1–1	AIK	Örebro
18:00 CEST (UTC+2)	Gerzić 29'; Wirtanen (yellow card) 67'	Report	Özkan (yellow card) 30'; Jagne 45+3'; Ortiz (yellow card) 53'; Johnson (yellow card) 80'	Stadium: Behrn Arena; Attendance: 11,158; Referee: Daniel Stålhammar

13 July 2009 14	AIK	1–0	IFK Göteborg	Stockholm
19:00 CEST (UTC+2)	Johnson (yellow card) 17' (yellow-red card) 66'; Johansson 41'; Kayongo-Mutumba (yellow card) 45'; Örlund (yellow card) 90+1'; Pavey (red card) 90+3'	Report	Eriksson (yellow card) 69'; Mustafa (yellow card) 90+2'	Stadium: Råsunda Stadion; Attendance: 20,174; Referee: Stefan Johannesson

20 July 2009 15	GAIS	2–2	AIK	Gothenburg
20:00 CEST (UTC+2)	Lycén (yellow card) 12' (goal) 37'; Gustafsson (yellow card) 23'; Ericsson 39'	Report	Kayongo-Mutumba 41'; Ortiz (yellow card) 42'; Obolo 77'; Johansson (yellow card) 84'	Stadium: Gamla Ullevi; Attendance: 5,010; Referee: Daniel Stålhammar

27 July 2009 16	AIK	1–0	GAIS	Stockholm
19:00 CEST (UTC+2)	Johansson 65'; Tjernström (yellow card) 67'	Report	Spong (yellow card) 90+1'	Stadium: Råsunda Stadion; Attendance: 16,851; Referee: Michael Lerjéus

30 July 2009 17	Malmö FF	0–0	AIK	Malmö
20:00 CEST (UTC+2)	Ofere (yellow card) 27'; Gabriel (yellow card) 39'; Ricardinho (yellow card) 48'; Hamad (yellow card) 67'	Report	Ortiz (yellow card) 9'; Hooiveld (yellow card) 27'; Johnson (yellow card) 62'	Stadium: Swedbank Stadion; Attendance: 15,485; Referee: Jonas Eriksson

8 August 2009 18	AIK	2–1	Brommapojkarna	Stockholm
16:00 CEST (UTC+2)	Kayongo-Mutumba (yellow card) 28'; Djordjic (yellow card) 56'; Jonsson 66'; Obolo 87'	Report	Haglund 52'	Stadium: Råsunda Stadion; Attendance: 13,516; Referee: Martin Ingvarsson

17 August 2009 19	Halmstad	1–2	AIK	Halmstad
19:00 CEST (UTC+2)	Rosén 10'; Rashkaj (yellow card) 63'	Report	Obolo 12'; Pavey 36'; Jonsson (yellow card) 63'; Ortiz (yellow card) 78' (yellow-red card) 82'; Djordjic (yellow card) 78'	Stadium: Örjans Vall; Attendance: 5,425; Referee: Michael Lerjéus

22 August 2009 20	AIK	1–1	Kalmar FF	Stockholm
16:00 CEST (UTC+2)	Johansson 3'; Pavey (yellow card) 62'; Johansson (yellow card) 90+1'	Report	Larsson (yellow card) 36'; Sobralense (yellow card) 51'; Eriksson 69'; Reinaldo (yellow card) 85'	Stadium: Råsunda Stadion; Attendance: 18,488; Referee: Martin Ingvarsson

29 August 2009 21	AIK	1–0	Trelleborg	Stockholm
16:00 CEST (UTC+2)	Jonsson 64'; Djordjic (yellow card) 88'	Report		Stadium: Råsunda Stadion; Attendance: 12,371; Referee: Jonas Eriksson

14 September 2009 22	BK Häcken	0–2	AIK	Gothenburg
19:00 CEST (UTC+2)		Report	Flávio 27'; Obolo 29'	Stadium: Rambergsvallen; Attendance: 4,117; Referee: Jonas Eriksson

21 September 2009 23	AIK	3–0	Örgryte	Stockholm
19:00 CEST (UTC+2)	Kayongo-Mutumba 44'; Jonsson 57' (pen.); Obolo 88'	Report	Leinar (yellow card) 56'	Stadium: Råsunda Stadion; Attendance: 14,021; Referee: Daniel Stålhammar

24 September 2009 24	Helsingborg	3–2	AIK	Helsingborg
18:00 CEST (UTC+2)	Wahlstedt (yellow card) 35'; Landgren 44'; Larsson 46+1', 70'; Tamboura (yellow card) 73'	Report	Hooiveld (yellow card) 45' (goal) 61'; Djordjic (yellow card) 62'; Johnson 86'	Stadium: Olympia; Attendance: 9,363; Referee: Markus Strömbergsson

28 September 2009 25	AIK	2–0	Djurgården	Stockholm
19:00 CEST (UTC+2)	Flávio 15', 59' (yellow card) 60'; Djordjic (yellow card) 61'	Report	Johannesson (yellow card) 27'; Mwila (yellow card) 28'	Stadium: Råsunda Stadion; Attendance: 26,241; Referee: Stefan Johannesson

4 October 2009 26	Elfsborg	0–0	AIK	Borås
19:30 CEST (UTC+2)	Ericsson (yellow card) 14'; Andersson (yellow card) 72'; Keene (yellow card) 88'	Report	Johnson (yellow card) 22'	Stadium: Borås Arena; Attendance: 12,917; Referee: Martin Ingvarsson

17 October 2009 27	AIK	1–0	Gefle	Stockholm
16:00 CEST (UTC+2)	Johansson (yellow card) 51'; Ortiz (yellow card) 59'; Özkan 70'; Djordjic (yellow card) 89'	Report	Bernhardsson (yellow card) 57'; Lantto (yellow card) 68'	Stadium: Råsunda Stadion; Attendance: 15,049; Referee: Daniel Stålhammar

25 October 2009 28	Hammarby	1–2	AIK	Stockholm
12:30 CEST (UTC+2)	Helg 60'; Moggia (yellow card) 73'	Report	Flávio 34'; Pavey 71'	Stadium: Råsunda Stadion; Attendance: 23,884; Referee: Jonas Eriksson

28 October 2009 29	AIK	1–1	Örebro	Stockholm
19:00 CET (UTC+1)	Kayongo-Mutumba 57'	Report	Anttonen (yellow card) 56'; Örlund 70' (o.g.); Kihlberg (yellow card) 88'	Stadium: Råsunda Stadion; Attendance: 23,735; Referee: Markus Strömbergsson

1 November 2009 30	IFK Göteborg	1–2	AIK	Gothenburg
15:00 CET (UTC+1)	Olsson 32'; Lund (yellow card) 45'; Eriksson (yellow card) 89'; Selaković (yellow card) 90+3'	Report	Obolo (yellow card) 44'; Karlsson (yellow card) 46'; Flávio 56'; Johansson (yellow card) 64'; Tjernström 85'	Stadium: Ullevi; Attendance: 17,233; Referee: Martin Hansson

=== Svenska Cupen ===
26 April 2009 Third Round	IFK Norrköping	1–2	AIK	Norrköping
18:00 CEST (UTC+2)	Racu (yellow card) 9'; Lönn (yellow card) 16'; Cakić 50'	Report	Djordjic (yellow card) 6' (goal) 44'; Obolo 75'	Stadium: Nya Parken; Attendance: 2,854; Referee: Daniel Stålhammar

13 May 2009 Fourth Round	IK Sirius	0–1	AIK	Uppsala
19:00 CEST (UTC+2)	Makacha (yellow card) 36'	Report	Lundberg 9'	Stadium: Studenternas IP; Attendance: 5,083; Referee: Martin Strömbergsson

8 July 2009 Quarterfinal	Mjällby AIF	1–2	AIK	Hällevik
19:00 CEST (UTC+2)	Fejzullahu 8'	Report	Obolo 39'; Kayongo-Mutumba 49'	Stadium: Strandvallen; Attendance: 6,661; Referee: Håkan Jonasson

6 September 2009 Semifinal	AIK	3–2 (a.e.t.)	BK Häcken	Stockholm
15:00 CEST (UTC+2)	Obolo 21'; Karlsson (yellow card) 39'; Hooiveld (yellow card) 75'; Johansson 118'; Jonsson 120+2'	Report	Östberg (yellow card) 29'; Vinícius Lopes 88', 95' (yellow card) 120+4'; Friberg (yellow card) 110'; Ranégie (yellow card) 120+2'	Stadium: Råsunda Stadion; Attendance: 8,117; Referee: Martin Ingvarsson

==== Final ====
7 November 2009	AIK	2–0	IFK Göteborg	Stockholm
16:00 CET (UTC+1)	Johansson (yellow card) 18'; Obolo 72'; Flávio (yellow card) 83' (goal) 90'	Report	Lund (yellow card) 13'; Bjarnason (yellow card) 17'; Stiller (yellow card) 83'	Stadium: Råsunda Stadium; Attendance: 24,365; Referee: Jonas Eriksson

== Squad statistics ==
As of match played 7 November 2009

=== Appearances and goals ===
No.	Pos	Nat	Player	Total		Allsvenskan		Svenska Cupen	
No.	Pos	Nat	Player	Apps	Goals	Apps	Goals	Apps	Goals
3	DF	(Sweden) SWE	Per Karlsson	31	0	26	0	5	0
4	DF	(Sweden) SWE	Nils-Eric Johansson	34	4	29	3	5	1
5	MF	(Argentina) ARG	Jorge Ortiz	30	0	27	0	3	0
6	DF	(Sweden) SWE	Walid Atta	9	0	4+4	0	1	0
7	MF	(Sweden) SWE	Bojan Djordjic	22	1	16+3	0	2+1	1
8	MF	(Sweden) SWE	Daniel Tjernström	30	1	17+9	1	1+3	0
9	FW	(Slovenia) SVN	Miran Burgić	9	0	1+7	0	0+1	0
10	FW	(Argentina) ARG	Iván Obolo	35	13	30	9	5	4
11	FW	(Brazil) BRA	Antônio Flávio	15	6	12	5	3	1
14	MF	(England) ENG	Kenny Pavey	23	3	15+4	3	3+1	0
17	FW	(The Gambia) GAM	Saihou Jagne	20	4	7+10	4	1+2	0
18	DF	(Sweden) SWE	Markus Jonsson	31	4	28	3	3	1
19	FW	(Sweden) SWE	Martin Kayongo-Mutumba	29	4	24	3	5	1
20	DF	(Netherlands) NED	Jos Hooiveld	31	1	28	1	3	0
21	FW	(Sweden) SWE	Mikael Thorstensson	14	0	4+8	0	0+2	0
22	GK	(Sweden) SWE	Nicklas Bergh	1	0	0	0	0+1	0
25	MF	(Sweden) SWE	Yussuf Saleh	12	0	2+8	0	1+1	0
27	GK	(Sweden) SWE	Daniel Örlund	35	0	30	0	5	0
29	MF	(Sweden) SWE	Gabriel Özkan	16	2	9+5	2	1+1	0
30	MF	(Liberia) LBR	Dulee Johnson	18	1	14+1	1	3	0
Players away on loan:
24	MF	(Sweden) SWE	Daniel Gustavsson	1	0	0+1	0	0	0
26	FW	(Sweden) SWE	Pontus Engblom	2	0	0+1	0	1	0
28	FW	(Sweden) SWE	Viktor Lundberg	7	2	2+4	1	1	1
Players who appeared for AIK but left during the season:
2	DF	(Sweden) SWE	Patrik Bojent	3	0	2	0	1	0
16	DF	(Sweden) SWE	Pierre Bengtsson	17	0	3+11	0	3	0

=== Goal scorers ===
Place	Position	Nation	Number	Name	Allsvenskan	Svenska Cupen	Total
1	FW	(Argentina)	10	Iván Obolo	9	4	13
2	FW	(Brazil)	11	Antônio Flávio	5	1	6
3	DF	(The Gambia)	17	Saihou Jagne	4	0	4
3	FW	(Sweden)	19	Martin Kayongo-Mutumba	3	1	4
3	DF	(Sweden)	4	Nils-Eric Johansson	3	1	4
3	DF	(Sweden)	18	Markus Jonsson	3	1	4
7	MF	(England)	14	Kenny Pavey	3	0	3
8	MF	(Sweden)	29	Gabriel Özkan	2	0	2
8	FW	(Sweden)	28	Viktor Lundberg	1	1	2
10	DF	(Netherlands)	20	Jos Hooiveld	1	0	1
10	MF	(Liberia)	30	Dulee Johnson	1	0	1
10	MF	(Sweden)	8	Daniel Tjernström	1	0	1
TOTALS					36	10	46

=== Clean sheets ===
Place	Position	Nation	Number	Name	Allsvenskan	Svenska Cupen	Total
1	GK	(Sweden)	27	Daniel Örlund	16	2	18
TOTALS					16	2	18

=== Disciplinary record ===
Number	Nation	Position	Name	Allsvenskan		Svenska Cupen		Total	
Number	Nation	Position	Name	Booked	Sent off (straight red)	Booked	Sent off (straight red)	Booked	Sent off (straight red)
3	(Sweden)	DF	Per Karlsson	1	0	1	0	2	0
4	(Sweden)	DF	Nils-Eric Johansson	5	0	1	0	6	0
5	(Argentina)	MF	Jorge Ortiz	10	1	0	0	10	1
6	(Sweden)	DF	Walid Atta	1	0	0	0	1	0
7	(Sweden)	MF	Bojan Djordjic	7	0	1	0	8	0
8	(Sweden)	MF	Daniel Tjernström	2	0	0	0	2	0
10	(Argentina)	FW	Iván Obolo	3	0	0	0	3	0
11	(Brazil)	FW	Antônio Flávio	1	0	1	0	2	0
14	(England)	MF	Kenny Pavey	4	1	0	0	4	1
18	(Sweden)	DF	Markus Jonsson	1	0	0	0	1	0
19	(Sweden)	FW	Martin Kayongo-Mutumba	3	0	0	0	3	0
20	(Netherlands)	DF	Jos Hooiveld	5	0	1	0	6	0
21	(Sweden)	FW	Mikael Thorstensson	1	0	0	0	1	0
27	(Sweden)	GK	Daniel Örlund	2	0	0	0	2	0
29	(Sweden)	MF	Gabriel Özkan	2	0	0	0	2	0
30	(Liberia)	MF	Dulee Johnson	5	1	0	0	5	1
Players away on loan:
Players who left AIK during the season:
2	(Sweden)	DF	Patrik Bojent	1	0	0	0	1	0
16	(Sweden)	DF	Pierre Bengtsson	3	0	0	0	3	0
Total				57	3	5	0	62	3
