= 2009 Svenska Cupen final =

- Event: 2009 Svenska Cupen
AIK	IFK Göteborg
2	0
- Date: 7 November 2009
- Venue: Råsunda Stadium, Solna
- Referee: Jonas Eriksson
- Attendance: 24,365

The 2009 Svenska Cupen Final took place on November 7, 2009 at Råsunda Stadium in Solna. The match was contested between recently crowned Allsvenskan champions AIK and Allsvenskan runners-up IFK Göteborg, The two teams actually met in the last and crucial league match of the season, just six days before the cup final, where AIK won 2-1 and became league champions.

This cup final was also won by AIK after two second half goals by Iván Obolo and Antônio Flávio. Thanks to the win, AIK secured a Double for the first time in their history. IFK Göteborg played their third cup final in a row and their fourth in the 2000s.

== Road to the Final ==
AIK			IFK Göteborg	
IFK Norrköping [SE] A 1-2	Djordjic 44'; Obolo 75'	Third round	Ersboda SK [D2] A 1-8	Johansson 3' (p); Alexandersson 13', 74'; Carlsson 16', 86'; Etéus 24'; Olsson 25'; Mostafa 76'
IK Sirius [SE] A 0-1	Lundberg 9'	Fourth round	Landskrona BoIS [SE] A 1-4	Wernbloom 34'; Sigurðsson 39' (p); Selakovic 77', 83'
Mjällby AIF [SE] A 1-2	Obolo 39'; Mutumba 49'	Quarter finals	Gefle IF [AS] H 3-1	Hysén 20', 31'; Bärkroth 89'
BK Häcken [AS] H 3-2 (AET)	Obolo 21'; Johansson 118'; Jonsson 120'+4 (p)	Semi finals	Helsingborgs IF [AS] A 1-3	Eriksson 17'; Hysén 76'; Bjarnason 84'

- Square brackets [ ] represent the opposition's division.

== Match details ==
7 November 2009
16:00 CET

AIK	2–0	IFK Göteborg
Obolo 72'; Flávio 90'	Report

Råsunda Stadium, Solna
Attendance: 24,365
Referee: Jonas Eriksson

AIK	IFK Göteborg

GK	27	(Sweden) Daniel Örlund
RB	18	(Sweden) Markus Jonsson
CB	3	(Sweden) Per Karlsson
CB	20	(Netherlands) Jos Hooiveld
LB	4	(Sweden) Nils-Eric Johansson (c)	(yellow card) 18'
RM	14	(England) Kenny Pavey		(substituted off) 66'
CM	5	(Argentina) Jorge Ortíz
CM	30	(Liberia) Dulee Johnson
LM	19	(Sweden) Martin Kayongo-Mutumba		(substituted off) 87'
FW	11	(Brazil) Antônio Flávio	(yellow card) 83'
FW	10	(Argentina) Iván Obolo
Substitutes:
MF	7	(Sweden) Bojan Djordjic		(substituted in) 66'
MF	8	(Sweden) Daniel Tjernström		(substituted in) 87'
FW	9	(Slovenia) Miran Burgic
GK	22	(Sweden) Nicklas Bergh
MF	29	(Sweden) Gabriel Özkan
Manager:
(Sweden) Mikael Stahre

GK	1	(Denmark) Kim Christensen
RB	16	(Sweden) Erik Lund	(yellow card) 13'
CB	10	(Iceland) Ragnar Sigurðsson
CB	14	(Iceland) Hjalmar Jónsson
LB	24	(Sweden) Mikael Dyrestam		(substituted off) 46'
CM	15	(Sweden) Jakob Johansson		(substituted off) 69'
CM	13	(Sweden) Gustav Svensson
RM	9	(Sweden) Stefan Selakovic (c)
CM	28	(Iceland) Theódór Elmar Bjarnason	(yellow card) 17'
LM	23	(Sweden) Sebastian Eriksson
FW	7	(Sweden) Tobias Hysén
Substitutes:
DF	5	(Finland) Tuomo Turunen
GK	12	(Sweden) Markus Sandberg
FW	19	(Sweden) Hannes Stiller	(yellow card) 83'	(substituted in) 69'
FW	21	(Sweden) Niklas Bärkroth
MF	38	(Sweden) Niclas Alexandersson		(substituted in) 46'
Manager:
(Sweden) Stefan Rehn (Sweden) Jonas Olsson

== See also ==
- 2009 Svenska Cupen
