= 2008 Superettan =

Superettan
- Season: 2008
- Champions: Örgryte
- Promoted: Örgryte; Häcken; Brommapojkarna
- Relegated: Limhamn Bunkeflo; Enköping; Degerfors
- Matches played: 240

The 2008 Superettan was part of the 2008 Swedish football season, and the ninth season of Superettan, Sweden's second-tier football division in its current format. A total of 16 teams contested the league.

== Overview ==
It was contested by 16 teams, and Örgryte IS won the competition.

== League table ==
Pos	Team	Pld	W	D	L	GF	GA	GD	Pts	Promotion, qualification or relegation
1	Örgryte IS (C, P)	30	17	6	7	57	32	+25	57	Promotion to Allsvenskan
2	BK Häcken (P)	30	15	10	5	58	28	+30	55	Promotion to Allsvenskan
3	IF Brommapojkarna (O, P)	30	16	6	8	45	29	+16	54	Qualification to Promotion playoffs
4	Assyriska FF	30	15	7	8	49	35	+14	52	
5	Ängelholms FF	30	14	9	7	51	33	+18	51	
6	Åtvidabergs FF	30	14	8	8	43	37	+6	50	
7	Falkenbergs FF	30	12	8	10	43	38	+5	44	
8	Mjällby AIF	30	12	7	11	44	36	+8	43	
9	FC Väsby United	30	11	6	13	38	36	+2	39	
10	Qviding FIF	30	9	11	10	39	41	−2	38	
11	Landskrona BoIS	30	10	8	12	36	44	−8	38	
12	IK Sirius	30	8	9	13	38	53	−15	33	
13	IF Limhamn Bunkeflo (R)	30	5	11	14	26	48	−22	26	Qualification to Relegation playoffs
14	Jönköpings Södra IF (O)	30	5	11	14	26	50	−24	26	Qualification to Relegation playoffs
15	Enköpings SK (R)	30	8	2	20	37	70	−33	26	Relegation to Division 1
16	Degerfors IF (R)	30	5	9	16	27	47	−20	24	Relegation to Division 1

Source: svenskfotboll.se (in Swedish)
Rules for classification: 1) points; 2) goal difference; 3) number of goals scored.
(C) Champions; (O) Play-off winners; (P) Promoted; (R) Relegated

== Relegation play-offs ==
Team 1	Agg.	Team 2	1st leg	2nd leg
Öster	2–4	Jönköpings Södra	2–1	0–3
Vasalund	4–1	Limhamn Bunkeflo	0–0	4–1

Jönköpings Södra stays in, Vasalund is promoted to, Superettan.

Öster stays in, Limhamn Bunkeflo is relegated to Division 1.

== Season statistics ==
=== Top scorers ===
Rank	Player	Club	Goals
1	(Sweden) Jonas Henriksson	Häcken	19
2	(Sweden) Marcus Ekenberg	Mjällby	17
3	(Sweden) Joel Johansson	Falkenberg	16
4	(Sweden) Daniel Larsson	Häcken	12
4	(Sweden) Hannes Stiller	Qviding	12
4	(Brazil) Ricardo Santos	Åtvidaberg	12
7	(Sweden) Mikael Thorstensson	Väsby United	11
7	(Sweden) Björn Anklev	Örgryte	11
9	(Sweden) Patrik Larsson	Ängelholm	10
9	(Brazil) Marcos Ferreira	Assyriska	10
11	4 players		9
15	2 players		8
17	9 players		7

=== Top goalkeepers ===
(Minimum of 10 games played)

Rank	Goalkeeper	Club	GP	GA	SV%	ShO
1	(Sweden) Kristoffer Nordfeldt	Brommapojkarna	29	27	82	12
2	(Bosnia and Herzegovina) Stojan Lukic	Falkenberg	27	34	81	11
3	(Sweden) Niklas Westberg	Väsby United	23	28	80	5
4	(Sweden) Peter Abrahamsson	Örgryte	15	15	78	5
5	(Sweden) Pär Hansson	Ängelholm	30	29	77	13
5	(Sweden) Mattias Asper	Mjällby	30	36	77	8
7	(Sweden) Christoffer Källqvist	Häcken	30	28	76	11
7	(Sweden) Richard Richardsson	Sirius	15	22	76	3
9	(Sweden) Dick Last	Örgryte	17	17	75	7
9	(Sweden) Milan Barjaktarevic	Sirius	10	16	75	1
