= Johan Carlsson =

Johan Carlsson may refer to:

- Johan Carlsson (footballer) (born 1981), Swedish footballer
- Johan Carlsson (golfer) (born 1986), Swedish professional golfer
- Johan Carlsson (tennis) (born 1966), Swedish tennis player
- Johan Carlsson, Swedish keyboardist for the band Carolina Liar
