= Josiah Johnson =

Liberian footballer

Personal information
- Date of birth: 27 July 1939 (age 87)
- Place of birth: Botaw, Liberia
- Position: Midfielder

Senior career*
Years	Team	Apps	(Gls)
- Youth Leaders
- Connections
1959–1971	Barrolle		

International career
1958–1971	Liberia		

Managerial career
- 1971–1978: Liberia
- * Club domestic league appearances and goals

Josiah Nils Johnson (born 27 July 1939) is a Liberian former football player, manager, and administrator, who played for and managed the Liberian national side. He played as a midfielder. He was also a presidential security guard and politician.

== Career ==
Johnson was born on 27 July 1939 in Botaw. The family moved to Monrovia, and he began playing football for Youth Leaders. He then moved to Connections, where he made his international debut in 1958. He then moved to Barrolle in 1959, staying there until 1971, when he began his coaching career. During his time with Barolle he trained with and worked for the Special Security Service, the Presidential security team.

He trained as a coach in West Germany, and then became head coach of the national team. He was replaced as head coach by German Bert Trautmann in 1978. Johnson remained with the national team set-up to assist Trautmann. In the 1980s he moved into football administration, and also served as Deputy Minister of Sports.

== Personal life ==
He is the father of national team player Dulee Johnson.
