= Nils-Eric Johansson =

Swedish footballer

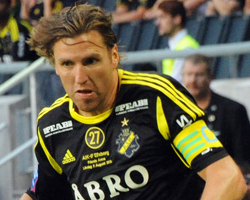
- Johansson with AIK in 2013

Personal information
- Full name: Nils-Eric Claes Johansson
- Date of birth: 13 January 1980 (age 46)
- Place of birth: Stockholm, Sweden
- Height: 1.86 m (6 ft 1 in)
- Position: Defender

Youth career
- –1994: IFK Viksjö
- 1995–1996: IF Brommapojkarna
- 1997: AIK
- 1997–1998: Bayern Munich

Senior career*
Years	Team	Apps	(Gls)
1998–2000	Bayern Munich II	54	(1)
1999–2000	Bayern Munich	2	(0)
2000–2001	1. FC Nürnberg	40	(2)
2001–2005	Blackburn Rovers	86	(0)
2005–2007	Leicester City	75	(1)
2007–2018	AIK	297	(16)
Total		554	(20)

International career
1995–1997	Sweden U17	28	(2)
1997–1999	Sweden U19	25	(6)
1999–2001	Sweden U21	21	(1)
2002	Sweden	3	(0)

Managerial career
- 2024–: Täby FK (ass. coach)
- * Club domestic league appearances and goals

Nils-Eric Claes Johansson (Swedish pronunciation: [ˈnɪlsˌeːrɪk ˈjuːhanˌsɔn]; born 13 January 1980) is a Swedish former professional footballer who played as a defender. Born in Stockholm, Johansson signed with FC Bayern Munich in 1997. He then went on to represent 1. FC Nürnberg, Blackburn Rovers, and Leicester City before returning to his native Sweden and the club AIK in 2007. He made 371 appearances for AIK until his retirement from football in 2018 due to a heart condition. He won three caps for the Sweden national team in 2002.

== Club career ==
=== Early career ===
Initially on the books at IFK Viksjö, IF Brommapojkarna, AIK, and Bayern Munich, he moved to 1. FC Nürnberg in August 2000, before several clubs across Europe, including Blackburn Rovers, claimed special interest in the player.

=== Blackburn Rovers ===
He moved to Blackburn in October 2001 for a fee of £2,700,000, signing a four-year contract. He made his debut in a 4–1 loss against Liverpool. His next match was a 7–1 victory against West Ham United. He made his 75th appearance for Blackburn during the 2003–04 season. However, following Mark Hughes' arrival as Blackburn manager, he found first team chances few and far between. In his time at Blackburn he started in the 2002 Football League Cup Final in which they beat Tottenham Hotspur 2–1. He scored twice during his spell at Blackburn: once against Manchester City in the League Cup and once against Barnsley in the FA Cup.

=== Leicester City ===
He was released by Blackburn at the end of the 2004–05 season and joined Leicester City on a free transfer at the start of the 2005–06 season. His first goal for Leicester came in a 1–0 win against Cardiff in the League Cup. Johansson's only league goal was a last minute winner against Preston in the 2006–07 season, which all but guaranteed Leicester's survival in the Championship.

=== AIK ===
He was released by Leicester in May 2007 and shortly afterwards he signed for Swedish outfit AIK, where he was eligible from 1 July. In 2009, he helped the team win Allsvenskan for the first time in 11 years.

On 18 February 2018, it was announced that he would retire, effective immediately, due to a heart condition. He played a total of 371 competitive games for the club.

== International career ==
After having appeared for more than 70 times for the Sweden U17, U19, and U21 teams, Johansson made his full international debut for Sweden on 21 August 2002 in a friendly game against Russia in which he replaced Johan Mjällby in the 66th minute. Later that year, he made two more appearances in friendly games against Portugal and the Czech Republic, coming on from the bench for Olof Mellberg and Erik Edman respectively.

After more than a ten-year absence from the national team, he was called up as a replacement for Oscar Wendt for the 2014 FIFA World Cup qualifiers against Austria and the Faroe Islands, but did not play.

In total, Johansson won three caps for the Sweden.

== Post-playing career ==
In July 2024, Johansson was hired by Täby FK as assistant coach to Dalibor Savic.

== Career statistics ==
=== Club ===
Appearances and goals by club, season and competition
Club	Season	League			Cup		Europe		Total	
Club	Season	Division	Apps	Goals	Apps	Goals	Apps	Goals	Apps	Goals
Bayern Munich	1998–99	Bundesliga	2	0	0	0	–		2	0
Bayern Munich	1999–2000	Bundesliga	0	0	0	0	1	0	1	0
Bayern Munich	Total		2	0	0	0	1	0	3	0
Bayern Munich II	1998–99	Regionalliga Süd	27	0	0	0	–		27	0
Bayern Munich II	1999–2000	Regionalliga Süd	26	1	0	0	–		26	1
Bayern Munich II	Total		53	1	0	0	–		53	1
1. FC Nürnberg	2000–01	2. Bundesliga	32	2	0	0	–		32	2
1. FC Nürnberg	2001–02	Bundesliga	8	0	0	0	–		8	0
1. FC Nürnberg	Total		40	2	0	0	–		40	2
Blackburn Rovers	2001–02	Premier League	20	0	8	2	–		28	2
Blackburn Rovers	2002–03	Premier League	30	0	5	0	4	0	39	0
Blackburn Rovers	2003–04	Premier League	14	0	1	0	–		15	0
Blackburn Rovers	2004–05	Premier League	22	0	5	0	–		27	0
Blackburn Rovers	Total		86	0	19	2	4	0	109	3
Leicester City	2005–06	Championship	39	0	4	0	–		43	0
Leicester City	2006–07	Championship	36	1	2	0	–		38	1
Leicester City	Total		75	1	6	0	–		81	1
AIK	2007	Allsvenskan	15	0	5	0	–		20	0
AIK	2008	Allsvenskan	28	1	0	0	–		28	1
AIK	2009	Allsvenskan	29	3	5	1	–		34	4
AIK	2010	Allsvenskan	26	0	4	1	6	0	36	1
AIK	2011	Allsvenskan	28	2	1	0	–		29	2
AIK	2012	Allsvenskan	30	0	2	0	12	0	44	0
AIK	2013	Allsvenskan	29	3	3	0	–		32	0
AIK	2014	Allsvenskan	27	2	1	0	4	0	32	2
AIK	2015	Allsvenskan	29	3	4	1	6	0	39	4
AIK	2016	Allsvenskan	28	0	5	0	5	1	38	1
AIK	2017	Allsvenskan	28	2	4	0	5	1	37	3
AIK	2018	Allsvenskan	–		–		–		–	
AIK	Total		297	16	34	3	38	2	369	21
Career total			553	20	59	5	43	2	655	27

=== International ===
Appearances and goals by national team and year
National team	Year	Apps	Goals
Sweden	2002	3	0
Total		3	0

== Honours ==
Bayern Munich

- Bundesliga: 1998–99, 1999–2000
- DFB-Pokal: 1999–2000

1. FC Nürnberg

- 2. Bundesliga: 2000–01

Blackburn Rovers

- Football League Cup: 2001–02

AIK

- Allsvenskan: 2009
- Svenska Cupen: 2009
- Svenska Supercupen: 2010
