= Reinaldo da Silva =

Brazilian footballer

Reinaldo
Personal information
- Full name: Reinaldo José Zacarias da Silva
- Date of birth: 25 May 1984 (age 42)
- Place of birth: São Paulo, Brazil
- Height: 1.82 m (6 ft 0 in)
- Position: Midfielder

Youth career
- 1999–2003: Nacional

Senior career*
Years	Team	Apps	(Gls)
2003	Siena		
2003–2005	Quilmes		
2005–2009	Palmeiras		
2007	→ América (RN) (loan)	22	(1)
2008	→ Nacional (loan)	1	(0)
2008–2009	→ Náutico (loan)	8	(0)
2009	→ Ituano (loan)		
200–2010	Kalmar	14	(1)
2010	Universitatea Cluj	8	(0)
2011	ABC	0	(0)
2011–2012	Bragantino	16	(3)
2014	Al-Faisaly	9	(0)
2015	Alecrim		
2015–2016	Lajeadense	6	(0)
2016	São José	2	(0)
2016	Caxias	0	(0)
2017	Pelotas		
2017–2018	Globo	32	(4)
2018–2019	Pelotas		
2019	Concórdia		
2020–2022	Nacional-SP		
- * Club domestic league appearances and goals

Reinaldo José Zacarias da Silva (born 25 May 1984), known as Reinaldo, is a Brazilian former professional footballer who played as a midfielder.

== Career ==
Reinaldo was born in São Paulo.

He signed his first professional contract with Siena in 2003.

He joined the Romanian side Universitatea Cluj in February 2010.
