= Rodrigo Soria =

Argentine footballer

Rodrigo Soria (born 14 February 1987 in Villa Domínico, Argentina) is a professional footballer who plays as a winger and second striker. He plays for Olmedo, on loan from Cúcuta Deportivo. Before that, he was on Sportivo Carapeguá of Paraguay.

== Teams ==
- (Argentina) Quilmes 2006–2009
- (Argentina) Defensa y Justicia 2009
- (Argentina) Gimnasia y Esgrima de Mendoza 2010
- (Paraguay) Sportivo Luqueño 2011–2012
- (Paraguay) Sportivo Carapegua 2012
- (Colombia) Cúcuta Deportivo 2013–2014
- (Argentina) Talleres Córdoba 2014
- (Argentina) Villa San Carlos 2014–
- (Ecuador) → Olmedo (loan) 2015–
