= Jonas Lundén =

Swedish footballer (born 1980)

Personal information
- Full name: Jonas Lundén
- Date of birth: December 27, 1980 (age 45)
- Place of birth: Borlänge, Sweden
- Height: 1.79 m (5 ft 10 1/2 in)
- Positions: Defender; striker (Note: Lundén played a striker earlier in his career.)

Senior career*
Years	Team	Apps	(Gls)
1998	Brage		
1998–2001	IFK Göteborg	57	(7)
2001–2006	IF Elfsborg	64	(1)
2006–2011	GAIS	78	(1)

International career
1999–2001	Sweden U21	6	(0)
2001	Sweden	1	(0)

Managerial career
- 2012–2015: GAIS (sporting director)
- * Club domestic league appearances and goals

Jonas Lundén is a Swedish former footballer who last played for GAIS in the Allsvenskan. He notably also played for IF Elfsborg and IFK Göteborg. Lundén played as a forward early in his career, but at Elfsborg he was converted to a winger and full back. In 2001, he played one game for the Sweden men's national football team. He received a degree of fame amongst video game fans as one of the best prospects in Championship Manager 2001/02 - one of a golden generation of Swedish youngsters who found fame outside of Sweden due to the cult football management game.
