= Nicklas Bergh =

Swedish footballer

Personal information
- Full name: Hans Nicklas Berg
- Date of birth: 6 September 1982 (age 44)
- Place of birth: Eskilstuna, Sweden
- Height: 1.97 m (6 ft 5 1/2 in)
- Position: Goalkeeper

Team information
- Current team: Eskilstuna City

Youth career
- 1988–1997: Triangelns IK
- 1998–1999: IFK Eskilstuna

Senior career*
Years	Team	Apps	(Gls)
2000–2002	IFK Eskilstuna	?	(?)
2002–2005	Eskilstuna City	38	(0)
2005–2011	AIK	7	(0)
2007	→ Enköpings SK (loan)	18	(0)
2011–	Eskilstuna City	0	(0)
- * Club domestic league appearances and goals as of 18:05, 20 September 2011 (UTC)

Hans Nicklas Bergh is a Swedish footballer who plays for Eskilstuna City as a goalkeeper.

He spent his youth playing for Triangelns IK and IFK Eskilstuna before making his senior debut in 2000. After two years playing in the third division, Bergh moved up a division to join Superettan club Eskilstuna City. It was there that he first met Stefan Soderberg, the club's sporting director, who took up the same role at his next club. Three and a half years later, Bergh was signed by AIK as back-up to Daniel Örlund. In 2007, Bergh spent time on loan with Enköpings SK and made 18 appearances in the Superettan. During a six-year stint with AIK he made 12 appearances in all competitions and seven in the Allsvenskan – the first division of Swedish football. In 2011, Bergh returned to Eskilstuna City, who were now playing in the fourth division.

== Honours ==
AIK

- Allsvenskan: 2009
- Svenska Cupen: 2009
