= Kali Ongala =

Tanzanian footballer (born 1979)

Personal information
- Date of birth: 31 August 1979 (age 47)
- Place of birth: London, England
- Height: 1.86 m (6 ft 1 in)
- Position: Midfielder

Senior career*
Years	Team	Apps	(Gls)
1999	Young Africans		
2005–2007	Väsby United		
2007–2010	GIF Sundsvall	43	(0)
2010	Umeå FC		
2010–2011	Azam F.C.		
- * Club domestic league appearances and goals

Kali Ongala (born 31 August 1979) is a Tanzanian former professional footballer who played as a midfielder, notably for Swedish club GIF Sundsvall.

== Career ==
Ongala began playing football with Young Africans in 1999. He went abroad for trials in England and the United States, before landing professional contracts in Sweden with FC Väsby United and GIF Sundsvall.

Kali is also the son of Tanzanian musician late Remmy Ongala.
