= Pablo Monsalvo =

Argentine footballer

Personal information
- Full name: Pablo Martín Monsalvo
- Date of birth: 17 January 1983 (age 43)
- Place of birth: Roque Pérez, Argentina
- Height: 1.78 m (5 ft 10 in)
- Position: Midfielder

Senior career*
Years	Team	Apps	(Gls)
2000–2006	Huracán	50	(2)
2006–2007	Olimpo	31	(3)
2007–2008	AIK	6	(0)
2008–2009	Newell's Old Boys	10	(0)
2009	Racing Club	0	(0)
2010	Instituto	15	(0)
2010–2011	Audax Italiano	22	(0)
2011–2012	Almirante Brown	13	(0)
2012–2013	Chacarita Juniors	26	(1)
Total		173	(6)
- * Club domestic league appearances and goals

Pablo Martín Monsalvo (born 17 January 1983, in Roque Pérez, Argentina) is an Argentine former professional footballer who played as a midfielder.

== Career ==
- Huracán 2000–2006
- Olimpo 2006–2007
- AIK 2007–2008
- Newell's Old Boys 2008–2009
- Racing Club 2009
- Instituto 2010
- Audax Italiano 2010–2011
- Almirante Brown 2011–2012
- Chacarita Juniors 2012–2013
