= Lucas Valdemarín =

Argentine footballer

Personal information
- Full name: Lucas Martín Valdemarín
- Date of birth: May 13, 1978 (age 48)
- Place of birth: Rio Tercero, Argentina
- Height: 1.73 m (5 ft 8 in)
- Position: Striker

Youth career
- 1982–1996: Sportivo 9 de Julio

Senior career*
Years	Team	Apps	(Gls)
1996–1998	Talleres	2	(0)
1998–2006	Vélez Sársfield	89	(20)
1999–2000	→ Independiente Rivadavia (loan)	15	(8)
2001	→ Unión Española (loan)	2	(0)
2005	→ Elche (loan)	4	(0)
2006	→ Racing Club (loan)	16	(3)
2006–2007	Arsenal de Sarandí	32	(8)
2007–2008	AIK	20	(6)
2008–2009	Colón	17	(2)
2009	→ San Luis Potosí (loan)	3	(0)
2009–2010	Defensa y Justicia	21	(6)
Total		221	(53)
- * Club domestic league appearances and goals

Lucas Martín Valdemarín (born 13 May 1978) is an Argentine former footballer from who played for Vélez, Unión Española (Chile), Elche (Spain), AIK (Sweden) and Club San Luis (Mexico).

== Career ==
Valdemarín developed his career as a youth with Sportivo 9 de Julio. In 1996, he was signed by Talleres de Córdoba, but shortly after Vélez Sársfield acquired his playing rights. During his period at Vélez Valdemarín struggled to earn a spot in the first team, and the club loaned him to other teams multiple times: to Independiente Rivadavia and Racing Club in Argentina, Unión Española of Chile and Elche CF from Spain, with two more spells with Vélez in between.

In 2006, he became a free agent and signed for Arsenal de Sarandí, where he formed a striker partnership with Mauro Óbolo. The following year, both relocated to Sweden to play for AIK Fotboll. In 2008 Valdemarín reached a mutual agreement with AIK to terminate his contract, and joined Colón de Santa Fe. He was a starter at the beginning, but his due to his lack of effectivity he was relegated to the bench. During the first semester of 2009, he had a brief spell in Mexico with San Luis F.C. Back in Colón he couldn't secure a place in the squad, and transferred to Defensa y Justicia in July 2009. In June 2010 ends his career.
