= Håkan Malmström =

Swedish footballer

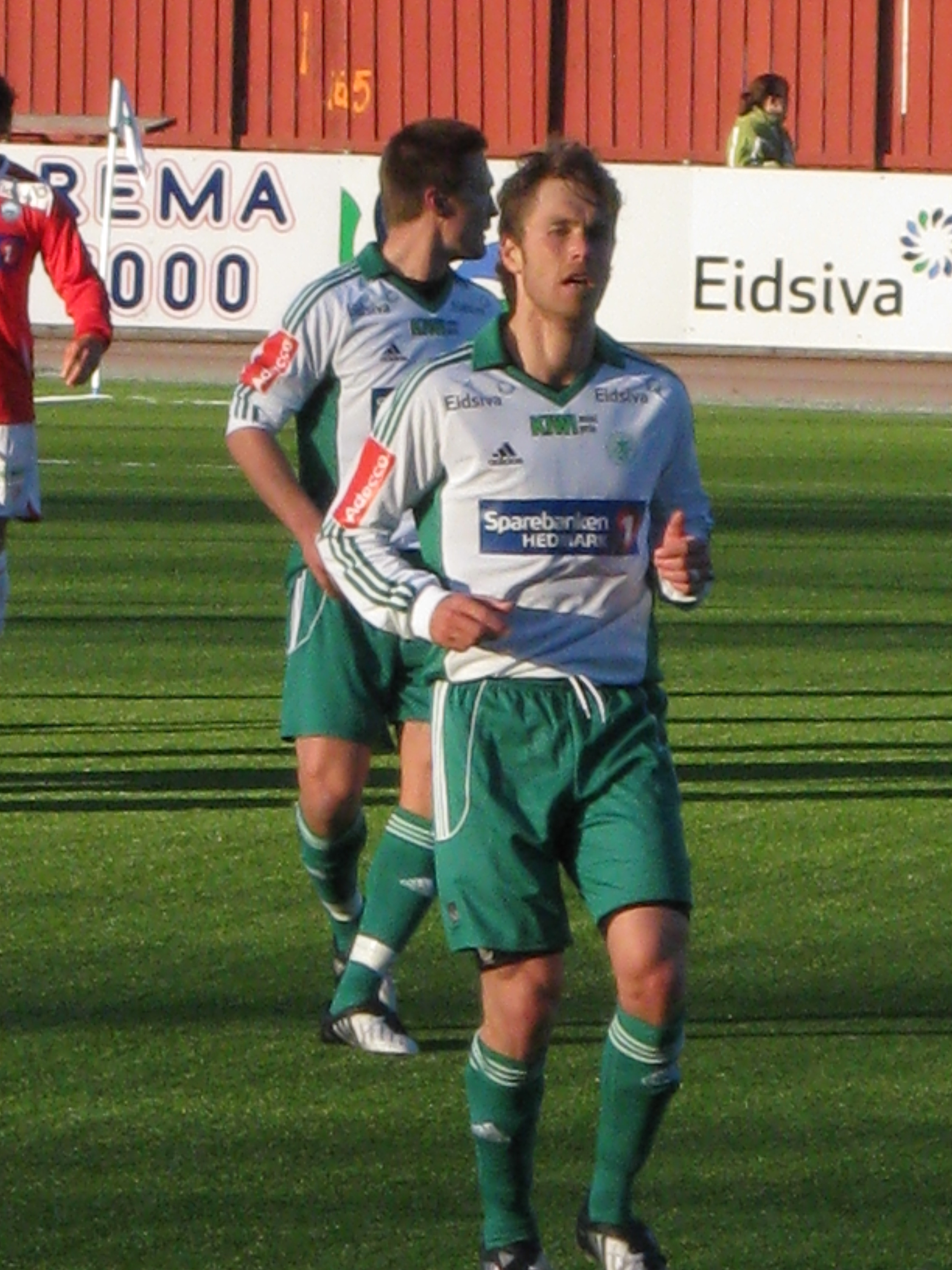
Håkan Malmström.

Håkan Malmström (born 16 July 1977) is a Swedish footballer. He was a defender in the Swedish football club IF Brommapojkarna. He came to Brommapojkarna in the 2004 season, previously he has played for Segeltorps IF and Spårvägens FF. He also played for Norwegian team Hamarkameratene in the 2008 and 2009 seasons.
