= Patrik Bojent =

Swedish footballer

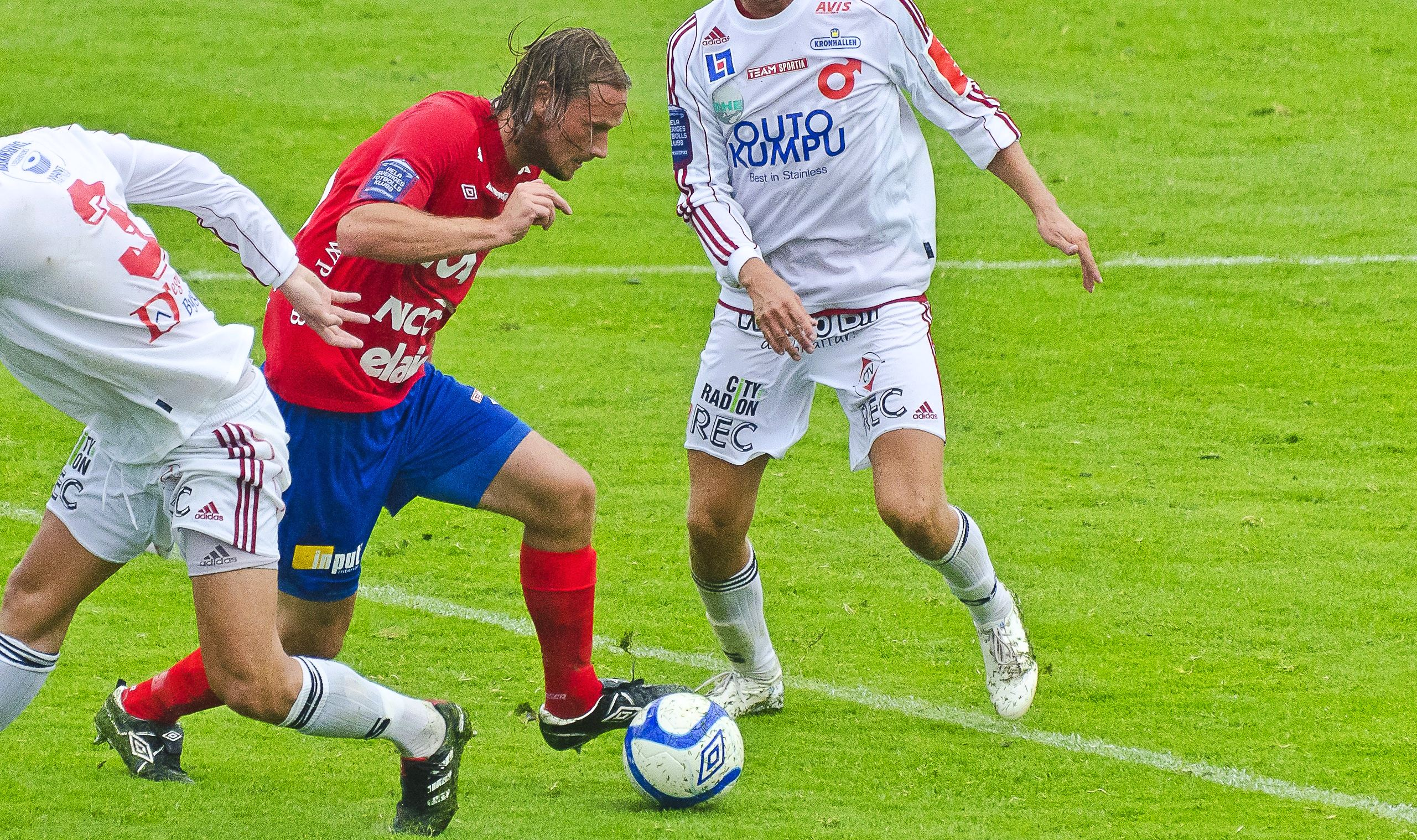

Personal information
- Full name: Patrik Rickard Bojent
- Date of birth: 26 December 1980 (age 45)
- Place of birth: Växjö, Sweden
- Height: 1.84 m (6 ft 0 in)
- Position: Left back

Youth career
- –1996: Hovmantorp
- 1997: Öster

Senior career*
Years	Team	Apps	(Gls)
1998–2004	Öster	156	(3)
2005–2006	Gefle	51	(1)
2007–2009	AIK	36	(1)
2009–2015	Öster	146	(3)
- * Club domestic league appearances and goals as of 1 January 2016

Patrik Bojent (Swedish pronunciation: [ˈpɑ̌ːtrɪk bʊˈjɛnːt]; born Patrik Karlsson on 26 December 1980) is a Swedish footballer who plays as a defender.

Bojent changed his last name from Karlsson to Bojent in 2008 when he got married.

== Career ==
He has spent a majority of his senior career at Östers IF from Växjö, during six seasons was he a member of their senior squad before he in 2005 moved to Gefle IF for two seasons before he was signed by AIK for the 2007 season. Bojent moved back to Växjö and Östers IF in late July 2009.

In February 2016, he joined Swedish amateur club Åryds IK. He left the club in 2018.
