= Markus Jonsson =

Swedish former professional footballer (born 1981)

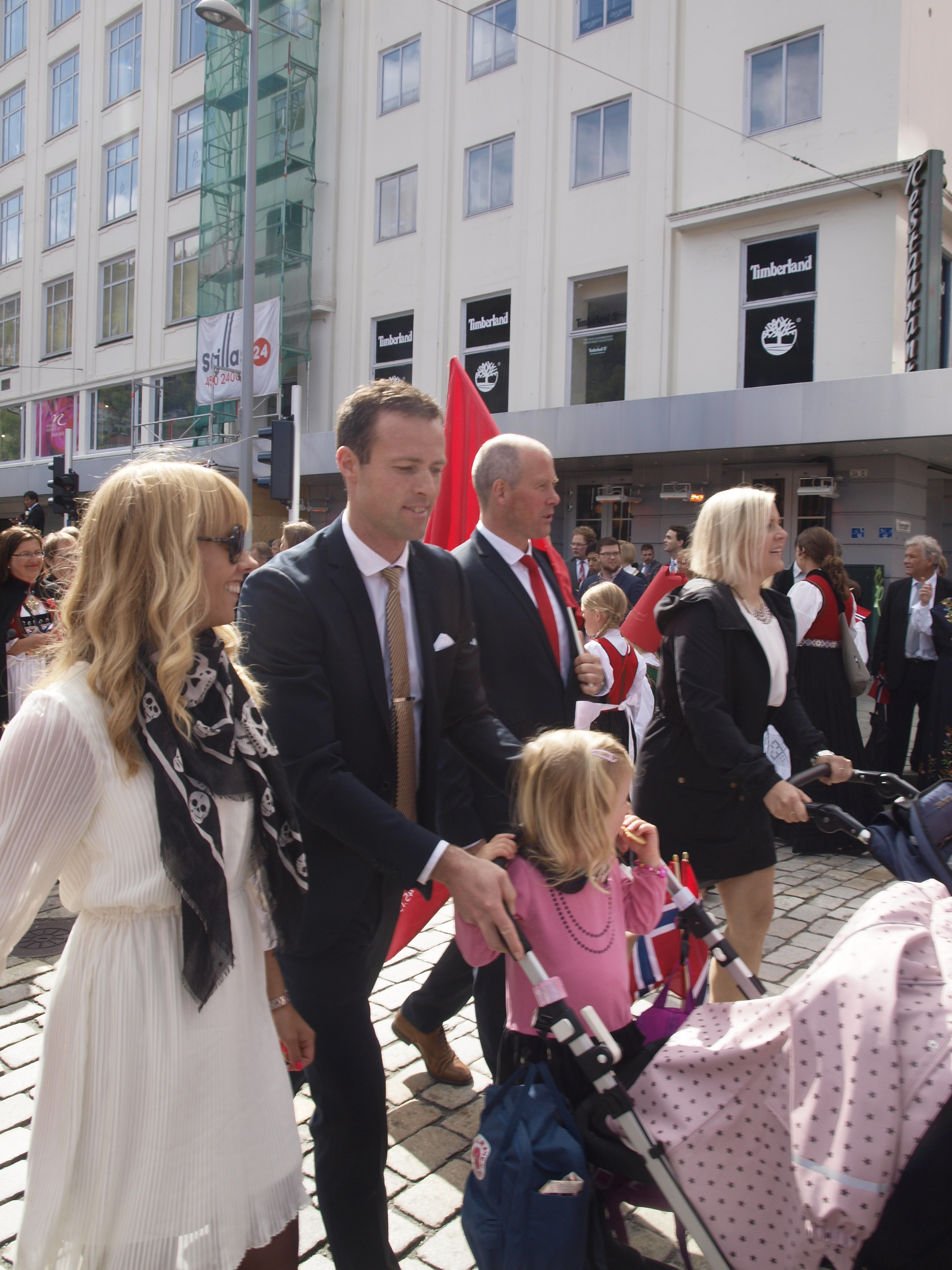

Personal information
- Full name: Per Markus Jonsson
- Date of birth: 9 March 1981 (age 45)
- Place of birth: Växjö, Sweden
- Height: 1.87 m (6 ft 2 in)
- Position: Right back

Youth career
- 1988–1997: Växjö
- 1998: Öster

Senior career*
| Years | Team | Apps | (Gls) |
| 1999–2005 | Öster | 166 | (22) |
| 2006–2009 | AIK | 89 | (14) |
| 2010–2011 | Panionios | 26 | (0) |
| 2012–2014 | Brann | 35 | (1) |
| Total | | 316 | (37) |

International career
| 2007–2009 | Sweden | 4 | (0) |
- * Club domestic league appearances and goals as of 9 November 2014

Per Markus Jonsson (born 9 March 1981) is a Swedish former professional footballer who played as a defender. He played for Öster, AIK, Panionios, and Brann during a club career that spanned between 1999 and 2014. A full international between 2007 and 2009, he won four caps for the Sweden national team.

== Club career ==
He was born in Växjö, Sweden, and played seven seasons for his hometown team Öster. In November 2005, Jonsson signed for AIK on a free transfer, and managed to out-compete Jimmy Tamandi for the right-back spot at AIK. Impressive play from Jonsson made him frequently named as a contender for said spot in the national team.

In addition to his defensive abilities, Jonsson is noted for his well-timed attacking runs and accurate crossing, and for his effective partnership with right winger Kenny Pavey. Jonsson is regarded as a reliable penalty taker and served as AIK’s first-choice option from the spot. He has stated in interviews that he has not missed a penalty in competitive senior matches, claiming a streak of 25 consecutive conversions during his time in Sweden.

In January 2010 he signed for Panionios on a free transfer. After two years in Greece, he signed for the Norwegian club Brann on 16 January 2012.

== International career ==
Jonsson won four caps for the Sweden national team between 2007 and 2009.

== Career statistics ==
As of 11 November 2013

| Club | Season | Division | League | | Cup | | Total | |
| Club | Season | Division | Apps | Goals | Apps | Goals | Apps | Goals |
|---|---|---|---|---|---|---|---|---|
| Östers IF | 2001 | Superettan | 26 | 2 | 0 | 0 | 26 | 2 |
| Östers IF | 2002 | Superettan | 28 | 2 | 0 | 0 | 28 | 0 |
| Östers IF | 2003 | Allsvenskan | 23 | 2 | 0 | 0 | 23 | 2 |
| Östers IF | 2004 | Superettan | 30 | 8 | 0 | 0 | 30 | 8 |
| Östers IF | 2005 | Superettan | 27 | 8 | 0 | 0 | 27 | 8 |
| AIK | 2006 | Allsvenskan | 24 | 7 | 0 | 0 | 24 | 7 |
| AIK | 2007 | Allsvenskan | 18 | 3 | 0 | 0 | 18 | 3 |
| AIK | 2008 | Allsvenskan | 19 | 1 | 0 | 0 | 19 | 1 |
| AIK | 2009 | Allsvenskan | 28 | 2 | 3 | 0 | 31 | 2 |
| Panionios | 2009–10 | Super League Greece | 6 | 0 | 0 | 0 | 6 | 0 |
| Panionios | 2010–11 | Super League Greece | 13 | 0 | 0 | 0 | 13 | 0 |
| Panionios | 2011–12 | Super League Greece | 8 | 0 | 0 | 0 | 8 | 0 |
| SK Brann | 2012 | Tippeligaen | 17 | 1 | 4 | 1 | 21 | 2 |
| SK Brann | 2013 | Tippeligaen | 11 | 0 | 0 | 0 | 11 | 0 |
| SK Brann | 2014 | Tippeligaen | 7 | 0 | 0 | 0 | 7 | 0 |
| Career Total | | | 284 | 36 | 7 | 1 | 291 | 37 |

== Honours ==
AIK

- Allsvenskan: 2009
- Svenska Cupen: 2009
