= Markus Strömbergsson =

Swedish football referee (born 1975)

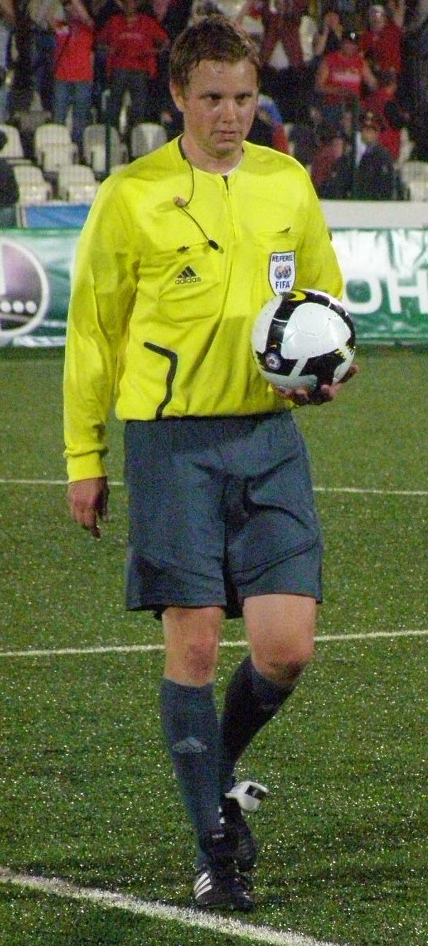
- Strömbergsson in 2009
- Full name: Markus Strömbergsson
- Born: 26 April 1975 (age 51); Sweden
- Other occupation: Full-time referee

Domestic
Years	League	Role
2002–	Superettan	Referee
2003–	Allsvenskan	Referee

International
Years	League	Role
2006–2012	FIFA listed	Referee

Markus Strömbergsson (born 26 April 1975) is a Swedish football referee. He was a full international referee for FIFA between 2006 and 2012. He became a professional referee in 1996 and has been an Allsvenskan referee since 2003. Strömbergsson has refereed 147 matches in Allsvenskan, 63 matches in Superettan and 47 international matches as of 2013. He is the brother of Martin Strömbergsson.

== See also ==
- List of football referees
