= Martin Ingvarsson =

Swedish football former referee (born 1965)

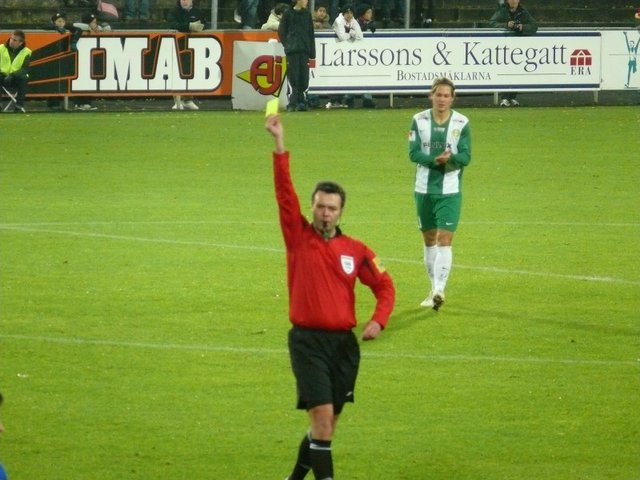
- Ingvarsson in 2010
- Full name: Martin Ingvarsson
- Born: 9 December 1965 (age 60); Hässleholm, Sweden
- Other occupation: Full-time referee

Domestic
Years	League	Role
1992–2011	Superettan	Referee
1993–2011	Allsvenskan	Referee

International
Years	League	Role
1997–2010	FIFA listed	Referee

Martin Ingvarsson (born December 9, 1965) is a Swedish football former referee. Ingvarsson currently resides in Hässleholm. He was a full international referee for FIFA between 1997 and 2010. He became a professional referee in 1984 and was an Allsvenskan referee between 1993 and 2011. Ingvarsson refereed 339 matches in Allsvenskan, 65 matches in Superettan and 94 international matches.

== See also ==
- List of football referees
