= Niklas Westberg =

Swedish footballer

Personal information
- Date of birth: 1 April 1979 (age 47)
- Place of birth: Kiruna, Sweden
- Height: 1.87 m (6 ft 2 in)
- Position: Goalkeeper

Youth career
- Kärrdals IF

Senior career*
Years	Team	Apps	(Gls)
1997–2000	AIK	0	(0)
1999–2000	→ IK Sirius (loan)	29	(0)
2001–2003	IF Brommapojkarna	46	(0)
2003–2006	Väsby United	101	(0)
2007	AIK	0	(0)
2008–2009	Väsby United	46	(0)
2010–2011	IFK Norrköping	39	(0)
2012–2013	IF Brommapojkarna	39	(0)
- * Club domestic league appearances and goals

Niklas Westberg (born 1 April 1979) is a Swedish former footballer who played as a goalkeeper.
