= Daniel Stålhammar =

Swedish former football referee (born 1974)

- Born: 20 October 1974 (age 52); Sweden
- Other occupation: Full-time referee

Domestic
Years	League	Role
2000–2013	Superettan	Referee
2002–2013	Allsvenskan	Referee

International
Years	League	Role
2004–2013	FIFA listed	Referee

Daniel Stålhammar (born October 10, 1974) is a Swedish former football referee. Stålhammar currently resides in Landskrona. He was a full international referee for FIFA between 2004 and 2013. He became a professional referee in 1995 and an Allsvenskan referee in 2002. Stålhammar refereed 190 matches in Allsvenskan, 73 matches in Superettan and 73 international matches. He retired on September 10, 2013, due to health problems.

== See also ==
- List of football referees
