= Johan Carlsson (footballer) =

Swedish football player

Personal information
- Date of birth: 1 August 1981 (age 45)
- Place of birth: Stockholm, Sweden
- Height: 1.78 m (5 ft 10 in)
- Position: Midfielder

Team information
- Current team: SIFFK

Youth career
- Tullinge TP
- Rönninge/Salem Fotboll
- Hammarby IF

Senior career*
Years	Team	Apps	(Gls)
–2002	Älvsjö AIK		
2003–2010	IFK Mariehamn	108	(1)
2011–	SIFFK		

International career^{‡}
2011	Åland Islands	4	(0)
- * Club domestic league appearances and goals as of 24 June 2013 ‡ National team caps and goals as of 24 June 2013

Johan Carlsson (born 1 August 1981) is a Swedish football player who has played for SIFFK. He has made 68 Veikkausliiga appearances for IFK Mariehamn and scored one goal.
