= Mikael Thorstensson =

Swedish footballer and coach

Personal information
- Full name: Lars Mikael Thorstensson
- Date of birth: January 25, 1985 (age 41)
- Place of birth: Sollentuna, Sweden
- Height: 1.85 m (6 ft 1 in)
- Position: Striker

Youth career
- ? – ?: Kärrdals IF
- ? – 2003: AIK

Senior career*
Years	Team	Apps	(Gls)
2003–2008	Väsby United	29	(11)
2009	AIK	12	(0)
2010–2012	Assyriska FF	76	(6)

Managerial career
- 2013–: Sollentuna United
- * Club domestic league appearances and goals as of 17:00, 10 April 2013 (UTC)

Mikael Thorstensson (Swedish pronunciation: [ˈmîːkaɛl ˈtɔ̂ʂːtɛnˌsɔn]; born January 24, 1985, in Sollentuna) is a retired Swedish football player and current coach. He currently manages his hometown team Sollentuna United FF in the Swedish Division 2.

Before the beginning of the 2009 season, Mikael was signed by AIK from the club's feeder club Väsby United. His debut for the first team came in the first game of the season when he came on as a substitute against Halmstad BK. During his stay in AIK he struggled with injuries. However, with his 12 appearances, he took part in the champion winning squad.

Mikael has already been with AIK, six years ago when he was a part of one of AIK's youth squads.

In January 2010, Mikael signed a two-year deal with Södertälje side Assyriska. In December 2012, he retired from football at the relatively early age of 27.

== Honours ==
=== AIK ===
- Allsvenskan: 2009
- Svenska Cupen: 2009
