= Iván Obolo =

Argentine footballer

Mauro Iván Obolo
Personal information
- Full name: Mauro Iván Obolo
- Date of birth: 28 September 1981 (age 45)
- Place of birth: Arroyito, Argentina
- Height: 1.85 m (6 ft 1 in)
- Position: Centre forward

Youth career
- 1987–1996: Cultural Arroyito
- 1996: Boca Juniors
- 1997–1998: Vélez Sársfield

Senior career*
| Years | Team | Apps | (Gls) |
| 1999–2006 | Vélez Sársfield | 50 | (10) |
| 2001–2002 | → Belgrano (loan) | 37 | (8) |
| 2002–2003 | → Piacenza (loan) | 7 | (0) |
| 2004–2005 | → Lanús (loan) | 32 | (5) |
| 2005–2006 | → Burgos (loan) | 36 | (9) |
| 2006–2007 | Arsenal de Sarandí | 38 | (9) |
| 2007–2009 | AIK | 74 | (24) |
| 2010–2011 | Arsenal de Sarandí | 76 | (25) |
| 2012 | Vélez Sársfield | 18 | (3) |
| 2012–2014 | Godoy Cruz | 75 | (18) |
| 2014 | Universidad Católica | 9 | (1) |
| 2015–2016 | Belgrano | 50 | (6) |
| Total | | 502 | (118) |
- * Club domestic league appearances and goals

Mauro Iván Obolo (Spanish pronunciation: [iˈβan ˈoβolo]; born 28 September 1981) is a former Argentine footballer.

== Club career ==
Obolo started his professional career with Vélez Sársfield. He made his flight top debut in the Argentine Primera on 27 April 1999 against Gimnasia de Jujuy. Obolo's first spell at Vélez lasted until June 2001. Subsequently, he was loaned to Belgrano where he had a successful run, followed by a short stint in Italy with Piacenza. The Apertura 2003 marked the returned of Obolo to "El Fortín". He played for Vélez until the end of the Clausura 2004. Next, he went on loan again to play for Argentine club Lanús and later for Burgos CF in Spain.

Obolo joined Arsenal de Sarandí as a free agent in 2006, and he became a key player for the club, appearing in all 19 of the Clausura 2007 games, and finishing as the club's top scorer with five goals.

Along with fellow countryman Lucas Valdemarín, Obolo moved to Swedish side AIK on 1 July 2007. At his arrival he immediately justified his transfer by showing class and flair on the pitch. He quickly became a key player at his new club. After winning both the Swedish league and cup 2009 he turned back home.

In January 2010, Obolo returned to Arsenal de Sarandí. On his return has scored 25 goals in 76 games, and also instrumental in the shares, so it is again tempted by large teams of South America as Grêmio, Boca Juniors and Vélez Sársfield.

On 10 January 2012, Obolo signed a three-year deal with Vélez Sársfield, in an undisclosed fee, rumoured to be a $1M fee. He then made his debut on 7 February, in a Copa Libertadores match against Defensor Sporting, getting on the scoresheet.

In early 2017 Obolo retired from professional football.

== Honours ==
AIK

- Allsvenskan: 2009
- Svenska Cupen: 2009
