= Miran Burgić =

Slovenian footballer

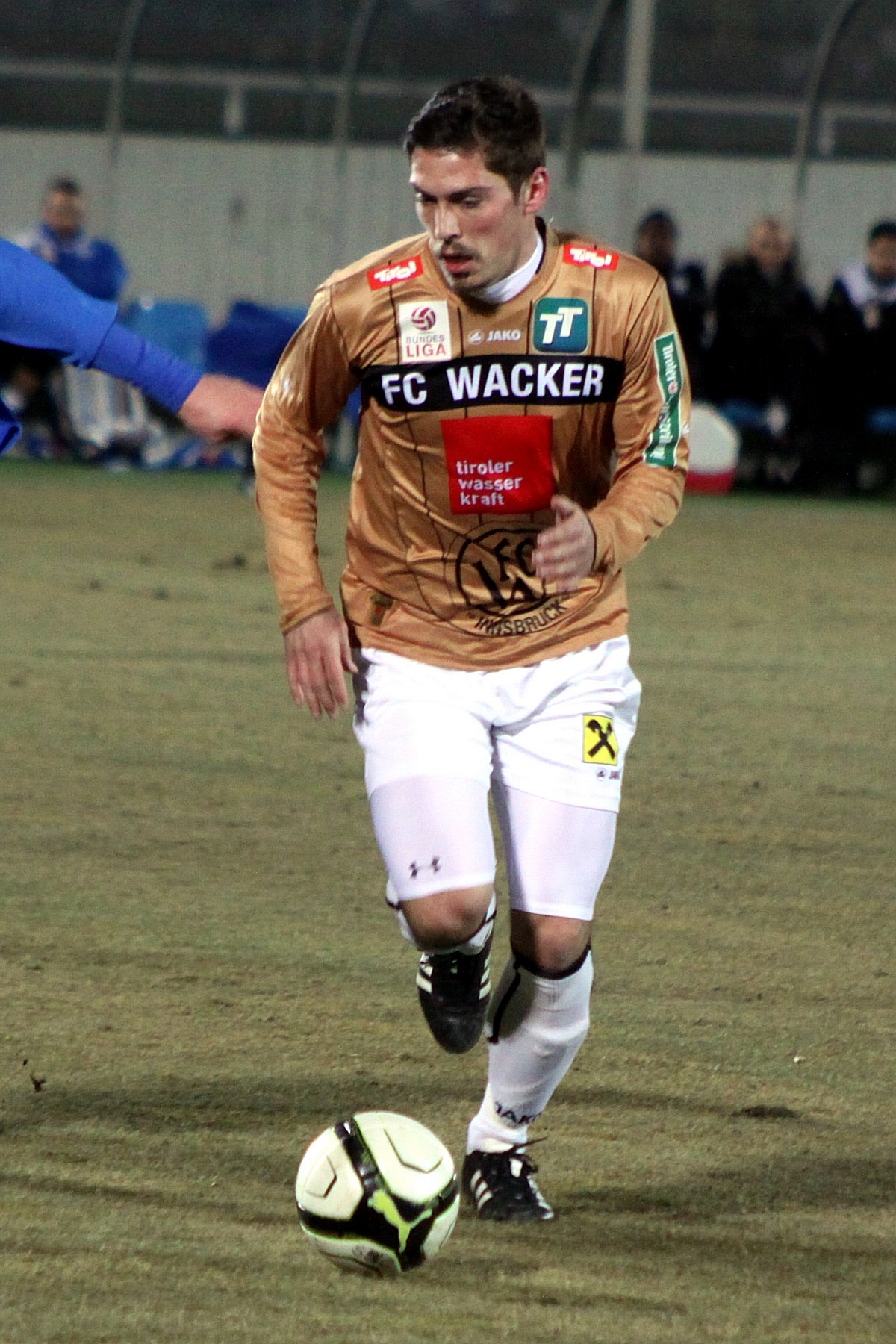

Personal information
- Full name: Miran Burgić
- Date of birth: 25 September 1984 (age 42)
- Place of birth: Trbovlje, SFR Yugoslavia
- Height: 1.81 m (5 ft 11 1/2 in)
- Position: Striker

Youth career
- 1991–1999: Zagorje
- 1999–2003: Gorica

Senior career*
| Years | Team | Apps | (Gls) |
| 2003–2006 | Gorica | 76 | (30) |
| 2006–2010 | AIK | 63 | (16) |
| 2010–2012 | Wacker Innsbruck | 67 | (11) |
| 2012–2013 | Hapoel Ramat Gan | 19 | (1) |
| 2014 | Ethnikos Achna | 18 | (3) |
| 2014–2015 | Olimpija Ljubljana | 21 | (1) |
| 2015–2018 | Gorica | 72 | (23) |
| Total | | 336 | (85) |

International career
| 2004–2005 | Slovenia U20 | 2 | (0) |
| 2004–2006 | Slovenia U21 | 12 | (4) |
| 2006–2008 | Slovenia | 5 | (0) |
- * Club domestic league appearances and goals

Miran Burgić (Slovene pronunciation: [ˈmiɾam ˈbuɾɡitʃ]; born 25 September 1984) is a Slovenian retired footballer.

He was sports director at Gorica from 2019 until 2020.

== Club career ==
In the 2005–06 season, while playing for Gorica, Burgič was the top goalscorer of the Slovenian League with 24 goals in 35 games. At that time he was a prospect for French, Swiss and German clubs. However, Burgić signed for AIK in the summer of 2006. In his home debut he scored two goals against Östers IF. Immediately he showed great ability to score in the penalty area with both feet and headers. Due to two severe knee injuries he did not reach his top level during his spell in Sweden.

During the summer 2008 when Burgič was back after injury he scored several goals and was close to a transfer to Greek side AEK Athens. However, he was stopped by then manager Rikard Norling, who considered him crucial for the team. After the 2008 season Norling got the sack and was replaced by Mikael Stahre. Burgič got the first half of the season destroyed by a knee-injury, and after his recovery he was not considered first choice among the strikers. In the same year the club won the title for the first time in eleven years, but Burgic only did nine appearances, including being substituted lately in the decisive game against IFK Göteborg where the club secured the title.

After the 2009 season Burgič wanted a new challenge and decided to not extend his contract that was about to expire in the summer of 2010. At the same time he was aspiring for a place in the Slovene national team that was about to participate in the World Cup. The club faced a tough campaign and had to fight to avoid relegation, and despite only playing occasionally, Burgič managed to score five goals, including two against Kalmar FF in a 3-0-win. In his last game for AIK, which was also the club's last game before the break for the World Cup, he scored a hat-trick in the club's 4-1-win against Åtvidaberg.

Shortly after it was announced that he had signed a contract with Austrian side Wacker Innsbruck on a free transfer. In the Austrian club he got somewhat of a new role, where he acted more of a second-striker.

In summer 2012 Burgič left Wacker Innsbruck since the club's finances were in terrible state. He later signed for Israeli side Hapoel Ramat Gan in the Israeli Premier League.

== International career ==
Burgić made his debut for Slovenia in an October 2006 European Championship qualification match against Luxembourg, coming on as a 85th-minute substitute for Klemen Lavrič, and earned a total of 5 caps, scoring no goals. Despite not playing regularly during the spring of 2010, Burgič was on the verge to break into the Slovenian squad that participated in the World Cup, and was included in the initial 30-man squad. However, he did not make the final cut. His final international was a November 2008 friendly match against Bosnia and Herzegovina.

== Honours ==
=== Club ===
ND Gorica

- Slovenian Championship: 2003–04, 2004–05, 2005–06

AIK

- Allsvenskan: 2009
- Svenska Cupen: 2009
- Supercupen: 2010

Hapoel Ramat Gan

- Israel State Cup: 2013

=== Individual ===
- Slovenian First Football League Top Scorer: 2006
