= Gabriel Özkan =

Swedish-Assyrian footballer

Personal information
- Full name: Gabriel Özkan
- Date of birth: May 23, 1986 (age 40)
- Place of birth: Stockholm, Sweden
- Height: 1.78 m (5 ft 10 in)
- Position: Midfielder

Youth career
- 1993–1998: Inter Orhoy
- 1999–2003: IF Brommapojkarna

Senior career*
Years	Team	Apps	(Gls)
2004–2006	IF Brommapojkarna	54	(3)
2006–2012	AIK	61	(8)
2013–2016	IF Brommapojkarna	18	(1)
Total		133	(12)

International career^{‡}
2003	Sweden U17	5	(0)
2005	Sweden U19	4	(1)
2006–2009	Sweden U21	6	(0)
- * Club domestic league appearances and goals as of 17 November 2012 ‡ National team caps and goals as of 31 March 2019

Gabriel Özkan (Swedish pronunciation: [ˈɡɑ̂ːbrɪɛl ˈœ̌sːkan]; born May 23, 1986, in Stockholm) is a Swedish former professional footballer who played as a midfielder. Gabriel joined AIK in the summer of 2006 from Brommapojkarna, after coming through the youth academy before becoming a first-team player, despite still being a teenager.

== Biography ==
On November 14, 2006, Özkan made his debut for the Swedish U21 football team against France. He struggled with injuries which cast doubt on his future in the game. He was regarded as one of the best prospects in Swedish football, but he wasn't able to play regularly during his last few seasons following a series of hamstring injuries. His Brazilian teammates nicknamed him as "the new Kaka".

== Honours ==
AIK

- Allsvenskan: 2009
- Svenska Cupen: 2009
- Svenska Supercupen: 2010
