= Dulee Johnson =

Swedish footballer (born 1984)

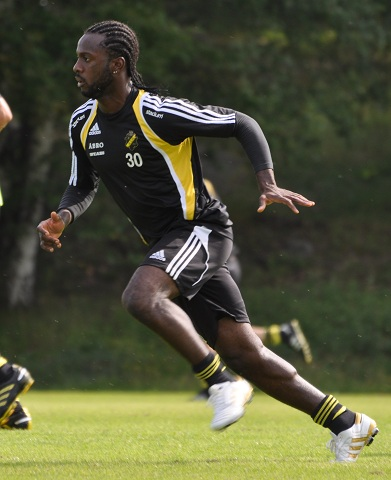
- Johnson with AIK

Personal information
- Date of birth: 7 November 1984 (age 42)
- Place of birth: Monrovia, Liberia
- Height: 1.76 m (5 ft 9 1/2 in)
- Positions: Midfielder; striker

Youth career
- 1997–2000: Lone Star FC

Senior career*
Years	Team	Apps	(Gls)
1998–2000	Floda BoIF	62	(45)
2001–2005	Häcken	117	(11)
2006–2008	AIK	64	(2)
2008–2009	Maccabi Tel Aviv	27	(1)
2009–2010	AIK	35	(4)
2011	Panetolikos	15	(2)
2011–2012	De Graafschap	20	(0)
2012	AmaZulu	23	(0)
2013	Brage	20	(0)
2014	Săgeata Năvodari	15	(0)
2014–2015	CSMS Iași	23	(0)
2015	Moss	8	(5)
2016	Molde	0	(0)
2016	Start	8	(1)
2018	Lyn Toppfotball	17	(3)
Total		454	(74)

International career^{‡}
2001–2016	Liberia	35	(0)
- * Club domestic league appearances and goals as of 14 April 2019 ‡ National team caps and goals as of 26 March 2016

Dulee Johnson (born 7 November 1984) is a Liberian former professional footballer who played as a midfielder and striker. He is best known for his time with AIK with which he won the 2009 Allsvenskan and 2009 Svenska Cupen. A full international between 2001 and 2016, he won 35 caps for the Liberia national team and played at the 2002 African Cup of Nations.

== Club career ==
=== Floda BoIF ===
Born in Monrovia, Dulee Johnson is one of several Liberian footballers who were brought to Sweden by Floda BoIF manager Stig Johansson in the late 1990s, after having been discovered at Gothia Cup. The Liberian players, which included Dioh Williams and Jimmy Dixon, moved into manager Johanssons villa where they lived while they played for the Swedish lower league club.

=== BK Häcken ===
After a few successful seasons, all the three previously mentioned players were signed by Allsvenskan club BK Häcken. Johnson quickly found success on the pitch for his new club. He was a starter for the full four and a half years with Häcken.

=== AIK and Maccabi ===
In 2006, Johnson was signed by AIK, where he became an instant success as the replacement in midfield for Derek Boateng.

In July 2008, Johnson signed a 3-year contract with Maccabi Tel Aviv. He only spent one season with the Israeli side, scoring one goal and making two assists. Johnson also helped them win the League Cup, also known as the Toto Cup. He left the club in June 2009, and signed a new deal with his previous club AIK.

=== Panetolikos ===
On 21 January 2011, it was announced that Dulee Johnson had signed an 18-month contract with Greek club Panetolikos.

=== De Graafschap ===
In May 2011, Johnson was on trial with Dutch club De Graafschap and was offered a contract. He played three Eredivisie matches and one KNVB Cup match in which he scored his only goal for De Graafschap. Due to his increased market value, the Liberian midfielder received an attractive offer from one of South Africa's big clubs and he made the move to play in the South African premiership.

=== AmaZulu ===
On 16 July 2012, Johnson signed a two-year contract with South African club AmaZulu. Johnson's quickly made his name in the league from the preseason matches and throughout his term in the league.

=== IK Brage ===
On 28 December 2012, Johnson signed a two-year contract with Swedish Superettan club IK Brage. In January 2014 he left the club for higher level after they got relegated to Division 1. On a free transfer Dulee moved to Romanian side Săgeata Năvodari.

=== Moss ===
On 2 September 2015, Johnson signed for Norwegian 2. divisjon side Moss FK.

=== Molde ===
At the end of the 2015 season, Johnson was reported to be training with Molde FK.

On 9 January 2016, Johnson signed a one-year contract with Tippeligaen side Molde FK., but played only one match, a first round cup match against Kristiansund, before being released from his contract 1 June 2016.

=== Lyn Toppfotball ===
On 1 June 2018, Johnson signed with 3. divisjon side Lyn Toppfotball for the remainder of the season.

== International career ==
In March 2010, he was granted Swedish citizenship, and is now regarded as an EU player. AIK's Liberian International Dulee Johnson Granted EU Citizenship. Dulee Johnson is one of Liberia's best creative midfielders, he played in the 2002 African Cup and Nations, and he was recently recalled to the Liberian national team to help them secure a slot for the 2017 African Cup of Nations. He will travel down to Liberia in June 2016 to play against Togo in one of Liberia's toughest football.

== Personal life ==
He is the son of former Liberia international player and manager Josiah Johnson.

== Career statistics ==
As of match played 25 September 2016

Appearances and goals by club, season and competition
Club	Season	League			National cup		League cup		Continental		Total	
Club	Season	Division	Apps	Goals	Apps	Goals	Apps	Goals	Apps	Goals	Apps	Goals
Floda	1998	Division 4	20	11			–		–		26	0
Floda	1999	Division 4	22	18			–		–		25	1
Floda	2000	Division 4	20	16			–		–		13	1
Floda	Total		62	45			0	0	0	0	62	45
BK Häcken	2001	Allsvenskan	13	0			–		–		13	0
BK Häcken	2002	Superettan	28	3			–		–		28	3
BK Häcken	2003	Superettan	27	3			–		–		27	3
BK Häcken	2004	Superettan	29	3			–		–		29	3
BK Häcken	2005	Superettan	20	2			–		–		20	2
BK Häcken	Total		117	11			0	0	0	0	117	11
AIK	2006	Allsvenskan	26	0			–		–		26	0
AIK	2007	Allsvenskan	25	1			–		6	2	31	3
AIK	2008	Allsvenskan	13	1			–		–		13	1
AIK	Total		64	2			0	0	0	0	64	2
Maccabi Tel Aviv	2008–09	Israeli Premier League	27	1			–		–		27	1
AIK	2009	Allsvenskan	15	1	3	1	–		–		18	2
AIK	2010	Allsvenskan	20	2	1	0	–		4	0	25	2
AIK	Total		35	3	4	1	0	0	4	0	43	4
Panetolikos	2010–11	Football League	4	0	0	0	–		–		4	0
De Graafschap	2011–12	Eredivisie	3	0	1	0	–		–		4	0
AmaZulu	2012–13	Premier Soccer League	4	0	0	0	2	0	–		6	0
Brage	2013	Superettan	20	0	3	0	–		–		23	0
Săgeata Năvodari	2013–14	Liga I	15	0	0	0	–		–		15	0
CSMS Iași	2014–15	Liga I	1	0	2	0	–		–		3	0
Moss	2015	2. divisjon	8	5	0	0	–		–		8	5
Molde	2016	Tippeligaen	0	0	1	0	–		–		1	0
Start	2016	Tippeligaen	8	1	0	0	–		–		8	1
Lyn Toppfotball	2018	3. divisjon	6	1	0	0	–		–		6	1
Career total			374	69	11	1	2	0	10	2	386	72

== Honors ==
Maccabi Tel Aviv

- Toto Cup: 2008–09

AIK

- Allsvenskan: 2009
- Svenska Cupen: 2009
- Supercupen: 2010
