= Daniel Örlund =

Swedish footballer

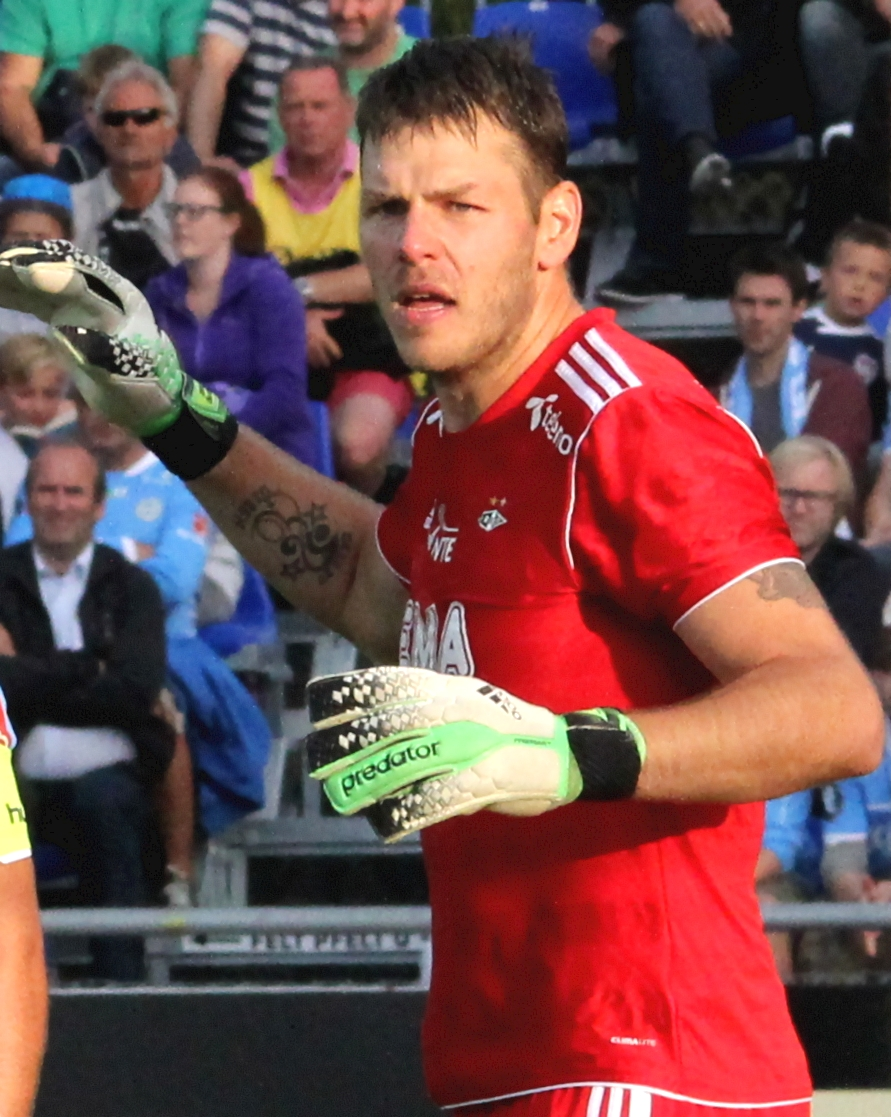
- Örlund in 2013

Personal information
- Full name: Daniel Kjell Valter Erik Örlund
- Date of birth: 23 June 1980 (age 46)
- Place of birth: Stockholm, Sweden
- Height: 1.94 m (6 ft 4 in)
- Position: Goalkeeper

Youth career
- 1986–1995: Enskede IK
- 1996–1998: Spårvägens FF

Senior career*
Years	Team	Apps	(Gls)
1999–2001	Spårvägens FF	43	(0)
2002–2009	AIK	123	(0)
2004	→ Café Opera United (loan)	25	(0)
2008	→ Fredrikstad (loan)	9	(0)
2010–2014	Rosenborg	119	(0)
2015	HJK Helsinki	20	(0)
2016	IF Brommapojkarna	13	(0)
Total		452	(0)

International career
2010	Sweden	1	(0)
- * Club domestic league appearances and goals

Daniel Kjell Valter Erik Örlund (born 23 June 1980) is a Swedish former professional footballer who played as a goalkeeper. He is best remembered for his time with AIK and Rosenborg. He won one cap for the Sweden national team.

== Club career ==
Örlund began his career at senior level at local club Spårvägen before signing for AIK in 2002. Örlund made his debut in AIK in a Svenska Cupen game against Carlstad United in 2003. AIK won with 4–1, and Örlund kept the goalkeeper position in the next cup round against Häcken as well. During the 2004 season he was on loan to FC Café Opera United where he made an impressive impact (25 games with seven clean sheets). At his return to AIK in 2005, while playing in Superettan, Örlund played all but one game and made himself a streak, when he did not let in a goal for 567 minutes. Since his return to AIK he has been the undisputed first choice and helped the club win the 2009 Allsvenskan and 2009 Svenska Cupen. On 27 November 2009, he signed for Rosenborg BK. Örlund left Rosenborg BK after his contract expired after the 2014 season. On 2 March 2015, it was announced by HJK Helsinki that they had signed Örlund.

== International career ==
Örlund made his first and only international appearance for the Sweden national team on 20 January 2010 in a friendly game against Oman, keeping a clean sheet in a 1–0 win. He was on the bench for a UEFA Euro 2012 qualifier in 2010 and for a 2014 FIFA World Cup qualifier in 2013, but never appeared in a competitive game for Sweden.

== Post-playing career ==
In 2017, Örlund was appointed goalkeeping coach of Djurgårdens IF Fotboll (women).

== Honours ==
Fredrikstad

- Norwegian Premier League runner up: 2008

AIK

- Allsvenskan: 2009
- Svenska Cupen: 2009

Rosenborg

- Norwegian Premier League Championship: 2010
