= Kenny Pavey =

English footballer

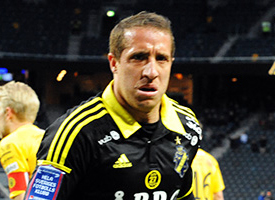

Personal information
- Full name: Kenneth Steven Pavey
- Date of birth: 23 August 1979 (age 47)
- Place of birth: Southwark, London, England
- Positions: Winger; wingback

Youth career
- 1990–1991: Athenley FC
- 1991–1995: Millwall
- 1995–1996: Sittingbourne

Senior career*
Years	Team	Apps	(Gls)
1997–1998	Sittingbourne	72	(13)
1998–2005	Ljungskile SK	117	(22)
2006–2011	AIK	126	(15)
2012	Ljungskile SK	18	(9)
2013	Östers IF	25	(2)
2014–2015	AIK	35	(1)
2016	Assyriska FF	22	(4)
2017–2018	Vasalunds IF	41	(2)
2019	Enskede IK	22	(2)

Managerial career
- 2019: Enskede IK (U18)
- * Club domestic league appearances and goals

Kenneth Steven Pavey (born 23 August 1979) is an English former professional footballer who played as a midfielder.

== Career ==
=== Early career ===
Born in South London, Pavey made his debut at local club Athenley FC before moving to his boyhood favourite club Millwall. He ended his junior years at Sittingbourne where he also made his debut at senior level. A transfer to Premier League side Aston Villa fell through in 1998 because the two clubs involved could not agree on a transfer fee. Pavey instead moved to Swedish second division side Ljungskile SK where he remained until the 2005 season, except for a break during the 2002 season.

=== AIK ===
Pavey was signed by Stockholm team AIK in October 2005, and was a regular in the starting line up.

In 2009, Pavey helped AIK to an unprecedented league and cup double, scoring a vital goal against local rivals Hammarby in the penultimate match of the season and then featuring in the Swedish Cup final in which AIK beat IFK Göteborg 2–0. His success at the time made him somewhat of a cult figure, both in Sweden and his native England. He was profiled on the popular football podcast The Football Ramble and was later interviewed live on air in a subsequent episode. In the interview, Pavey discussed the double win and his excitement at the prospect of playing Champions League football. Pavey then went on to play in the Champions League on four occasions, UEFA Cup on six occasions and Europa League twice.

=== Return to Ljungskile SK ===
After Pavey's AIK Contract expired, he re-signed for his former club Ljungskile SK for the 2012 season, who plays in the Swedish second division.

=== Östers IF ===
On 14 November 2012 it was revealed that Kenny Pavey would return to the Swedish first division having signed a two-year deal with Östers IF.

=== Return to AIK ===
Pavey rejoined AIK on 15 January 2014.

=== Retirement ===
In November 2019 40-year-old Pavey confirmed that he would retire at the end of the 2019 season.

== Personal life ==
Pavey's son Charlie currently plays for his former club, AIK.

== Honours ==
Ljungskile SK

- Division 2 Västra Götaland: 2001, 2004

AIK

- Allsvenskan: 2009
- Svenska Cupen: 2009
- Supercupen: 2010

Vasalunds IF

- Division 2 : 2018
