= List of Swedish football transfers summer 2011 =

This is a list of Swedish football transfers in the summer transfer window 2011 by club.

Only transfers in and out between 1 – 31 August 2011 of the Allsvenskan and Superettan are included.

== Allsvenskan ==
=== AIK ===
In: Note: Flags indicate national team as defined under FIFA eligibility rules; some limited exceptions apply. Players may hold more than one non-FIFA nationality.

No.	Pos.	Nation	Player
—	MF	TOG	Lalawélé Atakora (loan from Liberty Professionals)

Out: Note: Flags indicate national team as defined under FIFA eligibility rules; some limited exceptions apply. Players may hold more than one non-FIFA nationality.

No.	Pos.	Nation	Player
—	FW	SLE	Teteh Bangura (to Bursaspor)
—	FW	SLE	Mohamed Bangura (to Celtic)
—	MF	SWE	Kevin Walker (loan to GIF Sundsvall)

=== BK Häcken ===
In: Note: Flags indicate national team as defined under FIFA eligibility rules; some limited exceptions apply. Players may hold more than one non-FIFA nationality.

No.	Pos.	Nation	Player
—	MF	SWE	Andrés Vasquez (from Zürich)
—	DF	SWE	Oscar Lewicki (from Bayern Munich II)
—	FW	BRA	Maranhão (from Cruzeiro)
—	DF	BRA	Deivisson (loan from Cruzeiro)
—	FW	SWE	Robin Eriksson (loan from Heerenveen)

Out: Note: Flags indicate national team as defined under FIFA eligibility rules; some limited exceptions apply. Players may hold more than one non-FIFA nationality.

No.	Pos.	Nation	Player
—	DF	SWE	Robin Jansson (loan to Trollhättan) (Note: "Robin Jansson till Trollhättan" (in Swedish). bkhacken.se. 5 August 2011.)
—	FW	SWE	Mathias Ranégie (to Malmö FF)
—	MF	NGA	John Chibuike (to Rosenborg)

=== Djurgårdens IF ===
In: Note: Flags indicate national team as defined under FIFA eligibility rules; some limited exceptions apply. Players may hold more than one non-FIFA nationality.

No.	Pos.	Nation	Player
—	DF	KOS	Shqipran Skeraj (free transfer)
—	MF	BFA	Adama Guira (from Logroñés)
—	MF	DEN	Peter Nymann (from Esbjerg)
—	GK	SLE	Mehdi Khalil (from Köping FF)
—	MF	GHA	Gabriel Ahmed (from Köping FF)
—	MF	GHA	Imoro Adam (loan from International Allies)
—	FW	DEN	Nicolaj Agger (loan from Brøndby)

Out: Note: Flags indicate national team as defined under FIFA eligibility rules; some limited exceptions apply. Players may hold more than one non-FIFA nationality.

No.	Pos.	Nation	Player
—	DF	USA	Gale Agbossoumonde (loan return to Fort Lauderdale Strikers)
—	DF	SWE	Rtawi Mecconen (loan to Valsta Syrianska)
—	MF	FIN	Joel Perovuo (to HJK Helsinki)
—	MF	GHA	Gabriel Ahmed (loan to Jönköpings Södra)
—	MF	SWE	Carl Björk (loan to Jönköpings Södra)
—	DF	SWE	André Calisir (loan to Jönköpings Södra) (Note: "André Calisir lånas ut till Jönköping" (in Swedish). dif.se. 2 June 2011.)
—	GK	SWE	Christoffer Matwiejew (loan to Sollentuna United)

=== GAIS ===
In: Note: Flags indicate national team as defined under FIFA eligibility rules; some limited exceptions apply. Players may hold more than one non-FIFA nationality.

No.	Pos.	Nation	Player
—	MF	BRA	Wánderson (from Al-Ahli Jeddah)
—	MF	SWE	Erik Johansson (from Falkenberg)

Out: Note: Flags indicate national team as defined under FIFA eligibility rules; some limited exceptions apply. Players may hold more than one non-FIFA nationality.

No.	Pos.	Nation	Player
—	MF	SWE	Tommy Lycén (free transfer)
—	MF	SWE	Johan Mårtensson (to Utrecht)
—	MF	ISL	Hallgrímur Jónasson (loan to SønderjyskE)
—	MF	LBR	Amadaiya Rennie (loan return to Elfsborg)
—	FW	BEN	Razak Omotoyossi (to Syrianska)
—	FW	BRA	Álvaro Santos (loan return to Örgryte)
—	DF	SWE	Johan Rundqvist (loan to Qviding)

=== Gefle IF ===
In: Note: Flags indicate national team as defined under FIFA eligibility rules; some limited exceptions apply. Players may hold more than one non-FIFA nationality.

No.	Pos.	Nation	Player
—	MF	GHA	Joachim Adukor (loan from Emirates)
—	MF	SWE	Simon Lundevall (from Västerås SK)

Out: Note: Flags indicate national team as defined under FIFA eligibility rules; some limited exceptions apply. Players may hold more than one non-FIFA nationality.

No.	Pos.	Nation	Player
—	MF	SWE	James Frempong (to IFK Norrköping)

=== Halmstads BK ===
In: Note: Flags indicate national team as defined under FIFA eligibility rules; some limited exceptions apply. Players may hold more than one non-FIFA nationality.

No.	Pos.	Nation	Player
—	GK	SWE	Björn Åkesson (free transfer)
—	DF	SWE	Michael Svensson (free transfer) (Note: "Mitt i krisen – då gör Michael Svensson comeback i HBK" (in Swedish). fotbollskanalen.se. 28 June 2011.)
—	FW	SWE	Joel Johansson (loan from Elfsborg)

Out: Note: Flags indicate national team as defined under FIFA eligibility rules; some limited exceptions apply. Players may hold more than one non-FIFA nationality.

No.	Pos.	Nation	Player
—	MF	ESP	Raúl (loan return to Real Madrid Castilla)
—	MF	ESP	Javi Hernández (loan return to Real Madrid Castilla)
—	MF	ESP	José Zamora (loan return to Real Madrid Castilla)
—	DF	SWE	Emil Salomonsson (to IFK Göteborg)

=== Helsingborgs IF ===
In: Note: Flags indicate national team as defined under FIFA eligibility rules; some limited exceptions apply. Players may hold more than one non-FIFA nationality.

No.	Pos.	Nation	Player
—	FW	BRA	Rafael Porcellis (loan return from IFK Värnamo)
—	MF	SWE	Samuel Aziz (loan return from Ängelholm)
—	MF	NOR	Jørgen Skjelvik (loan from Stabæk)
—	MF	SWE	Sebastian Carlsén (loan from Inter Milan)
—	FW	BRA	Álvaro Santos (from Örgryte)
—	DF	NOR	Erlend Hanstveit (from Gent)
—	FW	NOR	Thomas Sørum (from Haugesund)
—	MF	ISL	Guðjón Pétur Lýðsson (loan from Valur)

Out: Note: Flags indicate national team as defined under FIFA eligibility rules; some limited exceptions apply. Players may hold more than one non-FIFA nationality.

No.	Pos.	Nation	Player
—	FW	BRA	Rafael Porcellis (contract terminated)
—	MF	SWE	Samuel Aziz (contract terminated)
—	DF	SWE	Marcus Nilsson (to Utrecht)
—	FW	SWE	Alexander Gerndt (to Utrecht)
—	MF	SWE	Marcus Bergholtz (loan to Stabæk)
—	DF	SWE	Peter Larsson (loan return to Copenhagen)
—	FW	SWE	Rasmus Jönsson (to Wolfsburg)
—	MF	SWE	Abdul Khalili (loan to IFK Värnamo) (Note: "Ny offensiv mittfältare till IFK Värnamo!" (in Swedish). ifkvarnamo.se. 8 July 2011.)

=== IF Elfsborg ===
In: Note: Flags indicate national team as defined under FIFA eligibility rules; some limited exceptions apply. Players may hold more than one non-FIFA nationality.

No.	Pos.	Nation	Player
—	MF	SWE	Philip Olofsson (from Boden)
—	GK	SWE	Andreas Andersson (loan return from Trollhättan)
—	MF	LBR	Amadaiya Rennie (loan return from GAIS)
—	FW	SWE	Zlatan Krizanović (from AZ)

Out: Note: Flags indicate national team as defined under FIFA eligibility rules; some limited exceptions apply. Players may hold more than one non-FIFA nationality.

No.	Pos.	Nation	Player
—	MF	LBR	Amadaiya Rennie (to Degerfors)
—	FW	SWE	Joel Johansson (loan to Halmstad)
—	DF	SWE	Johan Sjöberg (retires)
—	FW	ENG	James Keene (loan to Fredrikstad)
—	MF	SWE	Anton Wede (loan to Falkenberg)
—	DF	SWE	Anton Lans (loan to Falkenberg)
—	FW	SWE	Zlatan Krizanović (loan to Falkenberg)

=== IFK Göteborg ===
In: Note: Flags indicate national team as defined under FIFA eligibility rules; some limited exceptions apply. Players may hold more than one non-FIFA nationality.

No.	Pos.	Nation	Player
—	DF	SWE	Malek Iskander (from Husqvarna FF) (Note: "Malek Iskander klar för Blåvitt" (in Swedish). idrottonline.se.se. 16 June 2011.)
—	MF	SWE	Philip Haglund (from Heerenveen)
—	DF	SWE	Emil Salomonsson (from Halmstad)

Out: Note: Flags indicate national team as defined under FIFA eligibility rules; some limited exceptions apply. Players may hold more than one non-FIFA nationality.

No.	Pos.	Nation	Player
—	DF	ISL	Ragnar Sigurðsson (to Copenhagen)
—	FW	SWE	Nicklas Bärkroth (loan to Brommapojkarna)
—	FW	SWE	Pär Ericsson (loan to Mjällby)
—	MF	SWE	Thomas Olsson (loan to Åtvidaberg)
—	MF	SWE	Alexander Faltsetas (loan to Brage)
—	MF	SWE	Sebastian Eriksson (loan to Cagliari)

=== Kalmar FF ===
In: Note: Flags indicate national team as defined under FIFA eligibility rules; some limited exceptions apply. Players may hold more than one non-FIFA nationality.

No.	Pos.	Nation	Player
—	FW	BRA	Pedro Henrique (from Volta Redonda)

Out: Note: Flags indicate national team as defined under FIFA eligibility rules; some limited exceptions apply. Players may hold more than one non-FIFA nationality.

No.	Pos.	Nation	Player
—	GK	SWE	Zlatan Azinović (loan to Trelleborg)

=== Malmö FF ===
In: Note: Flags indicate national team as defined under FIFA eligibility rules; some limited exceptions apply. Players may hold more than one non-FIFA nationality.

No.	Pos.	Nation	Player
—	DF	SWE	Miiko Albornoz (from Brommapojkarna)
—	FW	SWE	Mathias Ranégie (from Häcken)

Out: Note: Flags indicate national team as defined under FIFA eligibility rules; some limited exceptions apply. Players may hold more than one non-FIFA nationality.

No.	Pos.	Nation	Player
—	MF	SWE	Guillermo Molins (to Anderlecht)

=== Mjällby AIF ===
In: Note: Flags indicate national team as defined under FIFA eligibility rules; some limited exceptions apply. Players may hold more than one non-FIFA nationality.

No.	Pos.	Nation	Player
—	FW	SWE	Pär Ericsson (loan from IFK Göteborg)
—	MF	SWE	Emmanuel Svensson (loan return from Falkenberg)
—	DF	SWE	Andreas Johansson (loan return from Kristianstads FF)
—	MF	SWE	Christopher Alvengrip (loan return from Västerås SK)
—	FW	SWE	Erton Fejzullahu (loan from NEC Nijmegen)

Out: Note: Flags indicate national team as defined under FIFA eligibility rules; some limited exceptions apply. Players may hold more than one non-FIFA nationality.

No.	Pos.	Nation	Player
—	FW	NED	Moestafa El Kabir (to Cagliari)
—	MF	SWE	Christopher Alvengrip (loan to Eskilsminne IF)

=== IFK Norrköping ===
In: Note: Flags indicate national team as defined under FIFA eligibility rules; some limited exceptions apply. Players may hold more than one non-FIFA nationality.

No.	Pos.	Nation	Player
—	MF	SWE	James Frempong (from Gefle)
—	FW	SWE	Isaac Kiese Thelin (from Karlslund)
—	DF	CRO	Nikola Tkalčić (from Varaždin)

Out: Note: Flags indicate national team as defined under FIFA eligibility rules; some limited exceptions apply. Players may hold more than one non-FIFA nationality.

No.	Pos.	Nation	Player
—	MF	SWE	Kristoffer Olsson (to Arsenal)
—	MF	SWE	Riki Cakić (loan to Assyriska FF)
—	MF	EST	Joonas Tamm (loan to Sylvia)
—	FW	SWE	Muamer Tanković (to Fulham)

=== Syrianska FC ===
In: Note: Flags indicate national team as defined under FIFA eligibility rules; some limited exceptions apply. Players may hold more than one non-FIFA nationality.

No.	Pos.	Nation	Player
—	MF	SEN	amadou Fofana (from Vitréenne FC)
—	FW	BEN	Razak Omotoyossi (from GAIS)
—	FW	SLE	Alusine Kamara (from Motala AIF)
—	FW	SLE	Mohamed Kabia (from Motala AIF)
—	DF	MNE	Vuk Martinović (loan from FK Lovćen)
—	MF	TUR	Orhan Sahin (from Galatasaray)

Out: Note: Flags indicate national team as defined under FIFA eligibility rules; some limited exceptions apply. Players may hold more than one non-FIFA nationality.

No.	Pos.	Nation	Player
—	MF	SWE	Semir Mete (loan to Syrianska Kerburan)
—	MF	NGA	Obie Etie Ikechukwu (loan to Öster)
—	FW	BEN	Razak Omotoyossi (to Zamalek SC)

=== Trelleborgs FF ===
In: Note: Flags indicate national team as defined under FIFA eligibility rules; some limited exceptions apply. Players may hold more than one non-FIFA nationality.

No.	Pos.	Nation	Player
—	MF	SLE	David Simbo (loan from Motala AIF)
—	GK	SWE	Zlatan Azinović (loan from Kalmar FF)

Out: Note: Flags indicate national team as defined under FIFA eligibility rules; some limited exceptions apply. Players may hold more than one non-FIFA nationality.

No.	Pos.	Nation	Player
—	FW	SWE	Fisnik Shala (loan to Höllvikens GIF)
—	FW	SWE	Nichlas Schön (loan to Höllvikens GIF)

=== Örebro SK ===
In: Note: Flags indicate national team as defined under FIFA eligibility rules; some limited exceptions apply. Players may hold more than one non-FIFA nationality.

No.	Pos.	Nation	Player
—	FW	FIN	Denis Abdulahi (loan return from Víkingur R.)
—	DF	ISL	Eiður Sigurbjörnsson (from ÍBV)
—	MF	FIN	Riku Riski (loan from Widzew Łódź)
—	FW	PAN	Brunet Hay (loan from Sporting San Miguelito)

Out: Note: Flags indicate national team as defined under FIFA eligibility rules; some limited exceptions apply. Players may hold more than one non-FIFA nationality.

No.	Pos.	Nation	Player
—	DF	SWE	Michael Almebäck (to Club Brugge)
—	DF	SWE	Per Johansson (loan to BK Forward)
—	DF	SWE	Oskar Johansson (contract terminated)
—	MF	SWE	Erik Nilsson (loan to Ljungskile)
—	MF	USA	Alejandro Bedoya (to Rangers)

== Superettan ==
=== Assyriska FF ===
In: Note: Flags indicate national team as defined under FIFA eligibility rules; some limited exceptions apply. Players may hold more than one non-FIFA nationality.

No.	Pos.	Nation	Player
—	MF	SWE	Riki Cakić (loan from IFK Norrköping)
—	FW	NGA	Emeh Izuchukwu (from Enköpings SK)
—	MF	BRA	Danilo de Souza (from Westfalia Rhynern)

Out: Note: Flags indicate national team as defined under FIFA eligibility rules; some limited exceptions apply. Players may hold more than one non-FIFA nationality.

No.	Pos.	Nation	Player
—	FW	SWE	Alexander Cecar (free transfer)
—	FW	SWE	Erido Poli (loan to Assyriska BK)
—	DF	SWE	Simon Ogunnaike (loan to Husqvarna FF)
—	DF	SWE	Gustaf Segerström (contract terminated)

=== Degerfors IF ===
In: Note: Flags indicate national team as defined under FIFA eligibility rules; some limited exceptions apply. Players may hold more than one non-FIFA nationality.

No.	Pos.	Nation	Player
—	MF	LBR	Amadaiya Rennie (from Elfsborg)

Out: Note: Flags indicate national team as defined under FIFA eligibility rules; some limited exceptions apply. Players may hold more than one non-FIFA nationality.

No.	Pos.	Nation	Player
—	FW	SWE	Stellan Carlsson (loan to BK Forward) (Note: "Stellan Carlsson lånas ut till BK Forward" (in Swedish). degerforsif.se. 28 July 2011.)
—	DF	SWE	Marcus Nilsson (loan to Karlskoga)
—	MF	SWE	Erik Nilsson (loan to Karlstad) (Note: "Erik Nilsson till KBK!" (in Swedish). karlstadbk.nu. 15 August 2011.)

=== Falkenbergs FF ===
In: Note: Flags indicate national team as defined under FIFA eligibility rules; some limited exceptions apply. Players may hold more than one non-FIFA nationality.

No.	Pos.	Nation	Player
—	MF	SWE	Anton Wede (loan from Elfsborg)
—	DF	SWE	Anton Lans (loan from Elfsborg)
—	FW	SWE	Zlatan Krizanović (loan from Elfsborg)

Out: Note: Flags indicate national team as defined under FIFA eligibility rules; some limited exceptions apply. Players may hold more than one non-FIFA nationality.

No.	Pos.	Nation	Player
—	MF	SWE	Emmanuel Svensson (loan return to Mjällby)
—	MF	SWE	Erik Johansson (to GAIS)

=== GIF Sundsvall ===
In: Note: Flags indicate national team as defined under FIFA eligibility rules; some limited exceptions apply. Players may hold more than one non-FIFA nationality.

No.	Pos.	Nation	Player
—	FW	SWE	Pa Dibba (from Brandbergens IF)
—	MF	SWE	Kevin Walker (loan from AIK)

Out: Note: Flags indicate national team as defined under FIFA eligibility rules; some limited exceptions apply. Players may hold more than one non-FIFA nationality.

No.	Pos.	Nation	Player
—	MF	SWE	Alieu Jagne (to Haukar)
—	DF	SWE	Kristian Ek (to Väsby United)
—	MF	SWE	Pontus Silfver (loan to Hudiksvalls ABK)

=== Hammarby IF ===
In: Note: Flags indicate national team as defined under FIFA eligibility rules; some limited exceptions apply. Players may hold more than one non-FIFA nationality.

No.	Pos.	Nation	Player
—	MF	LBR	Isaac Pupo (from Panionios)
—	DF	DEN	Cheikh Tidiane Sarr (from Lyngby BK)

Out: Note: Flags indicate national team as defined under FIFA eligibility rules; some limited exceptions apply. Players may hold more than one non-FIFA nationality.

No.	Pos.	Nation	Player
—	MF	SWE	Carlos Gaete Moggia (to Sirius)
—	FW	RSA	Nathan Paulse (to Platinum Stars)

=== IF Brommapojkarna ===
In: Note: Flags indicate national team as defined under FIFA eligibility rules; some limited exceptions apply. Players may hold more than one non-FIFA nationality.

No.	Pos.	Nation	Player
—	FW	SWE	Nicklas Bärkroth (loan from IFK Göteborg)

Out: Note: Flags indicate national team as defined under FIFA eligibility rules; some limited exceptions apply. Players may hold more than one non-FIFA nationality.

No.	Pos.	Nation	Player
—	DF	SWE	Miiko Albornoz (to Malmö FF)

=== IFK Värnamo ===
In: Note: Flags indicate national team as defined under FIFA eligibility rules; some limited exceptions apply. Players may hold more than one non-FIFA nationality.

No.	Pos.	Nation	Player
—	FW	SLE	Donald Wellington (loan from Ports Authority)
—	MF	SWE	Abdul Rahman Khalili (loan from Helsingborg) (Note: "Ny offensiv mittfältare till IFK Värnamo!" (in Swedish). ifkvarnamo.se. 8 July 2011.)

Out: Note: Flags indicate national team as defined under FIFA eligibility rules; some limited exceptions apply. Players may hold more than one non-FIFA nationality.

No.	Pos.	Nation	Player
—	FW	BRA	Rafael Porcellis (loan return to Helsingborg)
—	GK	SWE	Tobias Andersson (loan to Gnosjö IF)

=== IK Brage ===
In: Note: Flags indicate national team as defined under FIFA eligibility rules; some limited exceptions apply. Players may hold more than one non-FIFA nationality.

No.	Pos.	Nation	Player
—	MF	ARG	Gustavo Ramirez (from Cruz del Sur)
—	FW	ARG	Rodrigo Sebastian Zambrano (from Cruz del Sur)
—	MF	SWE	Alexander Faltsetas (loan from IFK Göteborg)

Out: Note: Flags indicate national team as defined under FIFA eligibility rules; some limited exceptions apply. Players may hold more than one non-FIFA nationality.

No.	Pos.	Nation	Player
—	MF	SWE	Bernhard Nyström (contract terminated)
—	DF	SWE	Magnus Tappert (to IFK Luleå)

=== Jönköpings Södra IF ===
In: Note: Flags indicate national team as defined under FIFA eligibility rules; some limited exceptions apply. Players may hold more than one non-FIFA nationality.

No.	Pos.	Nation	Player
—	MF	SWE	Carl Björk (loan from Djurgården)
—	DF	SWE	André Calisir (loan from Djurgården) (Note: "André Calisir lånas ut till Jönköping" (in Swedish). dif.se. 2 June 2011.)
—	MF	GHA	Gabriel Ahmed (loan from Djurgården)

Out: Note: Flags indicate national team as defined under FIFA eligibility rules; some limited exceptions apply. Players may hold more than one non-FIFA nationality.

No.	Pos.	Nation	Player
—	FW	SLE	Sheriff Suma (to FK Mughan)
—	GK	SWE	Ivo Vazgeč (contract terminated)
—	DF	FIN	Jukka Sauso (contract terminated)

=== Landskrona BoIS ===
In: Note: Flags indicate national team as defined under FIFA eligibility rules; some limited exceptions apply. Players may hold more than one non-FIFA nationality.

No.	Pos.	Nation	Player
—	FW	DEN	Mark Leth Pedersen (from FC Vestsjælland)
—	GK	SWE	Ivo Vazgeč (free transfer)

Out: Note: Flags indicate national team as defined under FIFA eligibility rules; some limited exceptions apply. Players may hold more than one non-FIFA nationality.

No.	Pos.	Nation	Player

=== Ljungskile SK ===
In: Note: Flags indicate national team as defined under FIFA eligibility rules; some limited exceptions apply. Players may hold more than one non-FIFA nationality.

No.	Pos.	Nation	Player
—	MF	SWE	Erik Nilsson (loan from Örebro)

Out: Note: Flags indicate national team as defined under FIFA eligibility rules; some limited exceptions apply. Players may hold more than one non-FIFA nationality.

No.	Pos.	Nation	Player
—	DF	SWE	Andreas Tobiasson (contract terminated)
—	FW	SWE	Andreas Lind (to Oddevold)
—	FW	BRA	Rafael Magalhaes (to Husqvarna FF)

=== Qviding FIF ===
In: Note: Flags indicate national team as defined under FIFA eligibility rules; some limited exceptions apply. Players may hold more than one non-FIFA nationality.

No.	Pos.	Nation	Player
—	DF	SWE	Johan Rundqvist (loan from GAIS)

Out: Note: Flags indicate national team as defined under FIFA eligibility rules; some limited exceptions apply. Players may hold more than one non-FIFA nationality.

No.	Pos.	Nation	Player

=== Västerås SK ===
In: Note: Flags indicate national team as defined under FIFA eligibility rules; some limited exceptions apply. Players may hold more than one non-FIFA nationality.

No.	Pos.	Nation	Player

Out: Note: Flags indicate national team as defined under FIFA eligibility rules; some limited exceptions apply. Players may hold more than one non-FIFA nationality.

No.	Pos.	Nation	Player
—	MF	BRA	Rodrigo Dantas (loan return to Botafogo)
—	FW	BRA	Jefferson (loan return to Botafogo)
—	FW	SWE	Daniel Andersson (loan to Husqvarna FF)
—	MF	SWE	Patrik St Cyr (loan to Husqvarna FF)
—	MF	SWE	Christopher Nilsson (loan return to Mjällby)
—	MF	SWE	Simon Lundevall (to Gefle)

=== Åtvidabergs FF ===
In: Note: Flags indicate national team as defined under FIFA eligibility rules; some limited exceptions apply. Players may hold more than one non-FIFA nationality.

No.	Pos.	Nation	Player
—	MF	SWE	Thomas Olsson (loan from IFK Göteborg)
—	FW	SWE	William Ankarhake (from Celtic)

Out: Note: Flags indicate national team as defined under FIFA eligibility rules; some limited exceptions apply. Players may hold more than one non-FIFA nationality.

No.	Pos.	Nation	Player
—	MF	SWE	Pontus Karlsson (loan to BK Kenty)

=== Ängelholms FF ===
In: Note: Flags indicate national team as defined under FIFA eligibility rules; some limited exceptions apply. Players may hold more than one non-FIFA nationality.

No.	Pos.	Nation	Player
—	DF	ESP	Gabriel Grillé Rocha (from CD Badajoz)
—	FW	USA	Lester Dewee (from Marseille)

Out: Note: Flags indicate national team as defined under FIFA eligibility rules; some limited exceptions apply. Players may hold more than one non-FIFA nationality.

No.	Pos.	Nation	Player
—	MF	SWE	Samuel Aziz (loan return to Helsingborg)
—	DF	SWE	Andreas Karlsson (loan to Kristianstads FF)

=== Östers IF ===
In: Note: Flags indicate national team as defined under FIFA eligibility rules; some limited exceptions apply. Players may hold more than one non-FIFA nationality.

No.	Pos.	Nation	Player
—	MF	SWE	Johan Persson (from Esbjerg)
—	MF	NGA	Obie Etie Ikechukwu (loan from Syrianska)
—	FW	NGA	Kevin Amuneke (free transfer)

Out: Note: Flags indicate national team as defined under FIFA eligibility rules; some limited exceptions apply. Players may hold more than one non-FIFA nationality.

No.	Pos.	Nation	Player
—	MF	CMR	Charles Anderson (to Limhamn Bunkeflo)
—	MF	SWE	Oliver Nedanovski (loan to Rydaholms GoIF)
—	FW	RWA	Olivier Karekezi (to APR FC) (Note: "Olivier Karekezi lämnar Öster" (in Swedish). smp.se. 13 August 2011.)
—	FW	SWE	Elias Todevski (retires)
