= 2008 AIK Fotboll season =

AIK
2008 season
- Manager: Rikard Norling
- Stadium: Råsunda Stadium
- Allsvenskan: 5th
- Svenska Cupen: Third Round vs Landskrona BoIS
- Top goalscorer: League: Iván Obolo (10); All: Iván Obolo (10)
- Highest home attendance: 34,173 vs Djurgården (24 April 2008)
- Lowest home attendance: 181 vs Landskrona BoIS (18 May 2008)
- Average home league attendance: 15,535 (Allsvenskan - 9 November 2008); 14,575 (All competitions - 9 November 2008)

AIK continued treading water in a disappointing season. The failure to qualify for European competitions ensured popular coach Rikard Norling got the sack, much to the dismay of the AIK supporters.

== Season events ==
In January, AIK announced the signing of Jorge Anchén to a three-year contract from Bella Vista.

On 29 July, AIK announced the signing of Tomi Maanoja to a three-and-a-half-year contract from Honka.

== Squad ==
As of match played 9 November 2008

No.	Name	Nationality	Position	Date of birth (age)	Signed from	Signed in	Contract ends	Apps.	Goals
Goalkeepers
1	Tomi Maanoja	(Finland)	GK	12 September 1986 (aged 22)	Honka	2008	2011	12	0
22	Nicklas Bergh	(Sweden)	GK	6 September 1982 (aged 26)	Eskilstuna City	2005		9	0
76	Lee Baxter	(Sweden)	GK	17 June 1976 (aged 32)	Landskrona BoIS	2008			
Defenders
2	Patrik Bojent	(Sweden)	DF	26 December 1980 (aged 27)	Gefle	2007	2009	41	2
3	Per Karlsson	(Sweden)	DF	2 January 1986 (aged 22)	Academy	2003			
4	Nils-Eric Johansson	(Sweden)	DF	13 January 1980 (aged 28)	Leicester City	2007	2010	49	1
6	Walid Atta	(Sweden)	DF	28 August 1986 (aged 22)	Väsby United	2008		12	0
16	Pierre Bengtsson	(Sweden)	DF	12 April 1988 (aged 20)	Academy	2006		35	0
18	Markus Jonsson	(Sweden)	DF	9 March 1981 (aged 27)	Öster	2006		68	12
Midfielders
5	Jorge Ortiz	(Argentina)	MF	20 June 1984 (aged 24)	San Lorenzo	2008		29	1
7	Bojan Djordjic	(Sweden)	MF	6 February 1982 (aged 26)	Plymouth Argyle	2008		14	0
8	Daniel Tjernström	(Sweden)	MF	19 February 1974 (aged 34)	Örebro SK	1999			
14	Kenny Pavey	(England)	MF	23 August 1979 (aged 29)	Ljungskile	2006		69	7
15	Kevin Walker	(Sweden)	MF	3 August 1989 (aged 19)	Örebro	2007		14	0
19	Jorge Anchén	(Uruguay)	MF	17 August 1980 (aged 28)	Bella Vista	2008	2010	15	3
23	Mats Rubarth	(Sweden)	MF	25 January 1977 (aged 31)	Örebro SK	2001			
25	Yussuf Saleh	(Sweden)	MF	22 March 1984 (aged 24)	Vasalund	2008		4	0
29	Gabriel Özkan	(Sweden)	MF	23 May 1986 (aged 22)	IF Brommapojkarna	2006		31	5
Forwards
9	Miran Burgić	(Slovenia)	FW	25 September 1984 (aged 24)	Gorica	2006		45	11
10	Iván Obolo	(Argentina)	FW	28 September 1981 (aged 27)	Arsenal de Sarandí	2007	2010	49	16
17	Saihou Jagne	(The Gambia)	FW	10 October 1986 (aged 22)	Väsby United	2008		19	3
26	Daniel Mendes	(Brazil)	FW	18 January 1981 (aged 27)	Degerfors	2006		62	10
Out on loan
	Daniel Örlund	(Sweden)	GK	23 June 1980 (aged 28)	Spårvägens	2002			
	Sotirios Papagiannopoulos	(Sweden)	DF	5 September 1990 (aged 18)	Academy	2008		0	0
	Magnus Eriksson	(Sweden)	MF	8 April 1990 (aged 18)	Academy	2006		0	0
Left during the season
11	Lucas Valdemarín	(Argentina)	FW	13 May 1978 (aged 30)	Arsenal de Sarandí	2007	2010	27	8
13	Daniel Arnefjord	(Sweden)	DF	21 March 1979 (aged 29)	Väsby United	2006		49	0
20	Khari Stephenson	(Jamaica)	MF	18 January 1981 (aged 27)	GAIS	2007	2010	32	4
21	Alexander Gerndt	(Sweden)	FW	14 July 1986 (aged 22)	Visby IF Gute	2007		7	1
25	Brwa Nouri	(Sweden)	MF	23 January 1987 (aged 21)	Academy	2004			
30	Dulee Johnson	(Liberia)	MF	7 November 1984 (aged 24)	BK Häcken	2006		74	5
	Emil Berger	(Sweden)	MF	23 May 1991 (aged 17)	Degerfors	2008		0	0

== Transfers ==
=== In ===
Date	Position	Nationality	Name	From	Fee	Ref.
1 January 2008	GK	(Sweden)	Lee Baxter	Rangers	Undisclosed	
1 January 2008	DF	(Sweden)	Walid Atta	Väsby United	Undisclosed	
1 January 2008	MF	(Sweden)	Emil Berger	Degerfors	Undisclosed	
1 January 2008	MF	(Sweden)	Bojan Djordjic	Plymouth Argyle	Undisclosed	
1 January 2008	MF	(Sweden)	Yussuf Saleh	Vasalund	Undisclosed	
1 January 2008	FW	(The Gambia)	Saihou Jagne	Väsby United	Undisclosed	
10 January 2008	MF	(Uruguay)	Jorge Anchén	Bella Vista	Undisclosed	
1 March 2008	MF	(Argentina)	Jorge Ortiz	San Lorenzo	Undisclosed	
29 July 2008	GK	(Finland)	Tomi Maanoja	Honka	Undisclosed	

=== Out ===
Date	Position	Nationality	Name	To	Fee	Ref.
29 January 2008	DF	(Norway)	Per Verner Rønning	Bodø/Glimt	Undisclosed	
1 July 2008	MF	(Sweden)	Emil Berger	Degerfors	Undisclosed	
8 July 2008	DF	(Sweden)	Daniel Arnefjord	Aalesund	Undisclosed	
18 July 2008	MF	(Jamaica)	Khari Stephenson	Aalesund	Undisclosed	
22 July 2008	FW	(Argentina)	Lucas Valdemarín	Colón	Undisclosed	
22 July 2008	FW	(Sweden)	Alexander Gerndt	Gefle	Undisclosed	
1 August 2008	MF	(Liberia)	Dulee Johnson	Maccabi Tel Aviv	Undisclosed	

=== Loans out ===
Start date	Position	Nationality	Name	To	End date	Ref.
	MF	(Sweden)	Magnus Eriksson	Väsby United		
	MF	(Sweden)	Magnus Eriksson	Täby		
	MF	(Sweden)	Magnus Eriksson	Akropolis		
1 January 2008	DF	(Sweden)	Sotirios Papagiannopoulos	Väsby United		
1 February 2008	MF	(Sweden)	Emil Berger	Väsby United	1 June 2008	
1 July 2008	FW	(The Gambia)	Saihou Jagne	Väsby United	31 December 2008	
30 July 2008	GK	(Sweden)	Daniel Örlund	Fredrikstad	31 December 2008	

=== Released ===
Date	Position	Nationality	Name	Joined	Date	Ref
31 December 2008	MF	(Uruguay)	Jorge Anchén	San Martín	4 January 2009	
31 December 2008	MF	(Sweden)	Mats Rubarth	Retired		

=== Trial ===
Date from	Position	Nationality	Name	Last club	Date to	Ref
Winter 2008	DF	(Sweden)	Niklas Backman	Väsby United		

== Friendlies ==
6 February 2008	Valsta Syrianska	2–1	AIK	Märsta
17:30 CET (UTC+1)	Koroma 41'; Draganov 45'; Junegard (yellow card) 71'; Yarjah (yellow card) 90+2'	Report	Arnefjord (yellow card) 21'; Mendes 38'; Backman (yellow card) 46' (yellow-red card) 55'	Stadium: Midgårdsvallen; Attendance: 972; Referee: Johan Hamlin

9 February 2008	AIK	1–1	IFK Mariehamn	Stockholm
14:00 CET (UTC+1)	Özkan (yellow card) 42'; Anchén 71'	Report	Arajuuri (yellow card) 15'; Carlsson 54'	Stadium: Skytteholms IP; Attendance: 4,162; Referee: Jonas Eriksson

13 February 2008	AIK	5–1	Vasalund	Stockholm
18:00 CET (UTC+1)	Arnefjord (yellow card) (goal) 55'; Jagne 20'; Anchén 25'; Bengtsson (yellow card); Lundberg 76'; Eriksson 78'	Report	Dimitriadis 42'	Stadium: Skytteholms IP; Attendance: 1,538; Referee: Jonas Eriksson

16 February 2008	AIK	1–2	IF Brommapojkarna	Stockholm
14:00 CET (UTC+1)	Obolo 33'	Report	Bergtoft (yellow card) 25' (yellow-red card) 82'; Ayrancı (yellow card) 25' (goal) 75'; Nilsson 70'	Stadium: Skytteholms IP; Attendance: 3,235; Referee: Stefan Johannesson

20 February 2008	AIK	3–0	IK Sirius	Stockholm
18:00 CET (UTC+1)	Wentzel 16'; Lundberg 35'; Eriksson 71'	Report		Stadium: Skytteholms IP; Attendance: 812; Referee: Michael Lerjéus

23 February 2008	AIK	0–0	TPS	Stockholm
14:00 CET (UTC+1)		Report		Stadium: Skytteholms IP; Attendance: 2,439; Referee: Lars Kratz

27 February 2008	AIK	0–1	Enköpings SK	Stockholm
18:00 CET (UTC+1)	Etie (yellow card)	Report	(yellow card) (yellow card); Sokol 85'	Stadium: Skytteholms IP; Attendance: 823; Referee: Dragan Banjac

1 March 2008	AIK	1–0	GIF Sundsvall	Stockholm
14:00 CET (UTC+1)	Arnefjord (yellow card) 26'; Jagne 49'; Bengtsson (yellow card) 72'; Valdemarín (yellow card) 89'	Report	Garðarsson (red card) 59'; Lustig (yellow card) 75'	Stadium: Skytteholms IP; Attendance: 1,311; Referee: Markus Strömbergsson

9 March 2008	Halmstad	3–0	AIK	Halmstad
13:00 CET (UTC+1)	Arvidsson 10'; Kujović 35'; Jönsson 49'	Report	Valdemarín (yellow card) 40'; Atta (yellow card) 72'	Stadium: Alevallen; Attendance: 750; Referee: Martin Hansson

13 March 2008	GD Tourizense	1–2	AIK	Touriz, Portugal
17:35 CET (UTC+1)	73'	Report	Mendes 39'; Jagne 74'	Stadium: Parque Desportivo Visconde de Vinhal; Attendance: 30

19 March 2008	AIK	2–0	Djurgårdens IF	Alcochete, Portugal
17:00 CET (UTC+1)	Anchén 3'; Mendes 90+4'	Report		Stadium: Sporting Clube de Portugals; Attendance: 35

14 June 2008	FF Jaro	2–4	AIK	Vallentuna
13:00 CEST (UTC+2)	Hyyrynen 40'	Report	Mendes (?), 10'; Anchén 3'; Burgić	Stadium: Vallentuna IP

18 June 2008	AIK	3–2	IFK Norrköping	Stockholm
15:00 CEST (UTC+2)	Burgić 48', 53'; Saleh 76'	Report	Nordbeck (yellow card) 58'; Cakić 81'; Gunnlaugsson 87'	Stadium: Karlberg; Attendance: 250; Referee: Jonas Eriksson

23 June 2008 Veterans Match	Hallsta IK	1–4	AIK	Hallstavik
18:00 CEST (UTC+2)	Goal	Report	Novaković	Stadium: IP Hallstavik; Attendance: 1,500

23 June 2008	Gefle IF	1–3	AIK	Hallstavik
19:30 CEST (UTC+2)	Claesson 22'	Report	Burgić 43'; Walker 59'; Ortiz (yellow card) 64'; Anchén 66'; Johansson (yellow card) 76'	Stadium: IP Hallstavik; Attendance: 1,500

4 September 2008	MyPa	1–1	AIK	Täby
16:00 CEST (UTC+2)	Kurittu 90+1'	Report	Pavey (yellow card) 39'; Anchén 69'	Stadium: Tibblevallen; Attendance: 300; Referee: Dragan Banjac

17 September 2008	BK Forward	0–4	AIK	Örebro
17:00 CEST (UTC+2)	Mathisen (yellow card) 43'	Report	Obolo 44'; Mendes 61'; Johansson (yellow card) 67'; Jagne 73', 90+2'	Stadium: Trängens IP; Attendance: 249; Referee: Johan Ovén

9 October 2008	Gefle IF	1–2	AIK	Strömsberg
15:00 CEST (UTC+2)	Berggren (penalty missed) 68'; Wikström 89'	Report	Burgić 45'; Mendes 55'; Anchén (yellow card) 59'	Stadium: Hedens IP; Attendance: 150; Referee: Johan Krantz

== Competitions ==
=== Overview ===
Competition	First match	Last match	Starting round	Final position	Record							
Competition	First match	Last match	Starting round	Final position	Pld	W	D	L	GF	GA	GD	Win %
Allsvenskan	30 March 2008	9 November 2008	Matchday 1	5th	30	12	9	9	36	32	+4	40.00
Svenska Cupen	1 May 2008	18 May 2008	Second round	Third round	2	1	0	1	2	1	+1	50.00
Total					32	13	9	10	38	33	+5	40.63

Last updated: 9 November 2008
Source: Competitions

=== Allsvenskan ===
==== League table ====
Pos	Team	Pld	W	D	L	GF	GA	GD	Pts	Qualification or relegation
3	IFK Göteborg	30	15	9	6	50	26	+24	54	Qualification to Europa League third qualifying round (Note: IFK Göteborg qualified for the Third qualifying round of the UEFA Europa League as Svenska Cupen champions 2008.)
4	Helsingborgs IF	30	16	6	8	54	41	+13	54	Qualification to Europa League first qualifying round (Note: Helsingborg qualified for the UEFA Europa League as they received IFK Göteborg's initial qualifying spot.)
5	AIK	30	12	9	9	36	32	+4	45	
6	Malmö FF	30	12	8	10	51	46	+5	44	
7	Örebro SK	30	11	9	10	36	39	−3	42	

Source: svenskfotboll.se (in Swedish)
Rules for classification: 1) points; 2) goal difference; 3) number of goals scored.

==== Results summary ====
Overall								Home						Away					
Pld	W	D	L	GF	GA	GD	Pts	W	D	L	GF	GA	GD	W	D	L	GF	GA	GD
30	12	9	9	36	32	+4	45	8	6	1	19	10	+9	4	3	8	17	22	−5

Last updated: 9 November 2008.
Source: Results

==== Results by matchday ====
Matchday	1	2	3	4	5	6	7	8	9	10	11	12	13	14	15	16	17	18	19	20	21	22	23	24	25	26	27	28	29	30
Ground	H	A	H	A	H	A	H	A	H	A	H	A	H	A	A	H	A	H	A	H	A	H	A	H	A	H	A	H	H	A
Result	D	L	W	D	W	L	D	W	W	W	W	W	D	L	L	W	L	L	D	D	L	D	D	D	L	W	L	W	W	W
Position																														

Updated to match(es) played on 9 November 2008. Source: Results
A = Away; H = Home; W = Win; D = Draw; L = Loss; P = Postponed

==== Results ====
30 March 2008 1	AIK	0–0	Kalmar FF	Stockholm
15:00 CEST (UTC+2)	Ortiz (yellow card) 26'; Pavey (yellow card) 89'	Report		Stadium: Råsunda Stadion; Attendance: 26,516; Referee: Markus Strömbergsson

7 April 2008 2	Elfsborg	3–0	AIK	Borås
20:00 CEST (UTC+2)	Augustsson (yellow card) 6'; Ishizaki 38'; Sjöhage 43'; Avdić 54'	Report	Johansson (yellow card) 44'; Tjernström (yellow card) 61'; Rubarth (yellow card) 74'	Stadium: Borås Arena; Attendance: 10,908; Referee: Martin Hansson

10 April 2008 3	AIK	1–0	GIF Sundsvall	Stockholm
19:00 CEST (UTC+2)	Atta (yellow card) 22'; Valdemarín 25'; Mendes (yellow card) 53'; Johansson (yellow card) 71'	Report	Hallenius (yellow card) 68'; Sigurðsson (yellow card) 71'	Stadium: Råsunda Stadion; Attendance: 12,618; Referee: Daniel Stålhammar

14 April 2008 4	Hammarby	1–1	AIK	Stockholm
20:00 CEST (UTC+2)	Dadómo (yellow card) 3'; Andersson (yellow card) 35'; Zengin (yellow card) 39'; Chanko 68'; Chanko (yellow card) 77'	Report	Valdemarín (yellow card) 19'; Arnefjord (yellow card) 35' (yellow-red card) 67'; Ortiz 90' (pen.)	Stadium: Råsunda Stadion; Attendance: 23,578; Referee: Stefan Johannesson

18 April 2008 5	AIK	1–0	Trelleborg	Stockholm
19:00 CEST (UTC+2)	Obolo 48'	Report	Bjurström (yellow card) 28'; Mensah (yellow card) 90+1'	Stadium: Råsunda Stadion; Attendance: 12,005; Referee: Michael Lerjéus

21 April 2008 6	IFK Göteborg	2–0	AIK	Gothenburg
19:00 CEST (UTC+2)	Berg 9'; Wallerstedt 14'	Report	Djordjic (yellow card) 66'; Stephenson (yellow card) 74' (yellow-red card) 89'	Stadium: Ullevi; Attendance: 9,679; Referee: Martin Hansson

24 April 2008 7	AIK	1–1	Djurgården	Stockholm
20:00 CEST (UTC+2)	Mendes 3'; Pavey (yellow card) 30' (yellow-red card) 78'; Johansson (yellow card) 75'	Report	Komac (yellow card) 18'; Davids (yellow card) 22'; Andersson (yellow card) 70'; Quirino 78' (pen.)	Stadium: Råsunda Stadion; Attendance: 34,173; Referee: Peter Fröjdfeldt

27 April 2008 8	Gefle	0–1	AIK	Gävle
17:45 CEST (UTC+2)	Woxlin (yellow card) 14'	Report	Obolo 14'; Arnefjord (yellow card) 16'	Stadium: Strömvallen; Attendance: 4,614; Referee: Jonas Eriksson

5 May 2008 9	AIK	1–0	Halmstad	Stockholm
20:00 CEST (UTC+2)	Ortiz (yellow card) 88'; Pavey 89'	Report	Rashkaj (yellow card) 75'	Stadium: Råsunda Stadion; Attendance: 14,051; Referee: Markus Strömbergsson

8 May 2008 10	IFK Norrköping	1–2	AIK	Norrköping
19:45 CEST (UTC+2)	Blomberg (yellow card) 48'; Amuneke 78' (pen.)	Report	Johnson 46'; Mendes 55'; Tjernström (yellow card) 59'; Rubarth (yellow card) 75'	Stadium: Nya Parken; Attendance: 13,784; Referee: Peter Fröjdfeldt

11 May 2008 11	AIK	2–0	Malmö FF	Stockholm
17:45 CEST (UTC+2)	Stephenson 86'; Johnson 89'; Rubarth (yellow card) 90+3'	Report	Andersson (yellow card) 27'; Johansson (yellow card) 64'	Stadium: Råsunda Stadion; Attendance: 19,569; Referee: Jonas Eriksson

3 July 2008 12	Örebro	1–4	AIK	Örebro
19:00 CEST (UTC+2)	Wikström (yellow card) 43'; Wowoah 85'	Report	Obolo 2', 34'; Burgić 30'; Anchén 64'; Bengtsson (yellow card) 86'	Stadium: Behrn Arena; Attendance: 9,701; Referee: Daniel Stålhammar

6 July 2008 13	AIK	2–2	GAIS	Stockholm
17:45 CEST (UTC+2)	Obolo 49'; Burgić 56'; Mendes (yellow card) 86'	Report	Pachajyan 37'; Lundén (yellow card) 48'; Héðinsson (yellow card) 66'; B. Andersson 71'	Stadium: Råsunda Stadion; Attendance: 15,886; Referee: Martin Ingvarsson

15 July 2008 14	Helsingborg	2–1	AIK	Helsingborg
19:45 CEST (UTC+2)	C. Andersson 40'; Larsson 62'	Report	Burgić 12'; Mendes (yellow card) 74'	Stadium: Olympia; Attendance: 11,703; Referee: Peter Fröjdfeldt

21 July 2008 15	Ljungskile	2–1	AIK	Ljungskile
19:00 CEST (UTC+2)	Senften (yellow card) 28'; Lövgren 47'; Augustsson (yellow card) 61'; Kitić (yellow card) 67'; Jansson 90+1' (pen.)	Report	Anchén 25'; Bengtsson (yellow card) 45+1'; Pavey (yellow card) 74'; Bergh (yellow card) 90'	Stadium: Skarsjövallen; Attendance: 4,219; Referee: Markus Strömbergsson

28 July 2008 16	AIK	1–0	Ljungskile	Stockholm
19:00 CEST (UTC+2)	Anchén (yellow card) 22'; Jagne (yellow card) 53'; Bengtsson (yellow card) 80'; Mendes 87'	Report	Kondaponi (yellow card) 22'; Tabe (yellow card) 35'; Smylie (yellow card) 37'; Kitić (yellow card) 40'; Jansson (yellow card) 54'	Stadium: Råsunda Stadion; Attendance: 13,500; Referee: Daniel Stålhammar

4 August 2008 17	Kalmar FF	3–2	AIK	Kalmar
20:00 CEST (UTC+2)	D.Elm 1'; Rydström (yellow card) 29'; Ingelsten 38'; R.Elm 51'; Lindberg (yellow card) 73'	Report	Pavey (yellow card) 3'; Jagne 7', 15'; Djordjic (yellow card) 35'; Johansson (yellow card) 90+3'	Stadium: Fredriksskans; Attendance: 6,510; Referee: Martin Ingvarsson

10 August 2008 18	AIK	0–2	Elfsborg	Stockholm
18:00 CEST (UTC+2)	Johansson (yellow card) 29'; Ortiz (yellow card) 53'	Report	Ishizaki 24'; Berglund 31'; Nilsson (red card) 53'	Stadium: Råsunda Stadion; Attendance: 14,881; Referee: Jonas Eriksson

16 August 2008 19	GIF Sundsvall	1–1	AIK	Sundsvall
16:00 CEST (UTC+2)	Hallenius 2'; Berntsson (yellow card) 30'	Report	Anchén 21'; Jonsson (yellow card) 27'; Mendes (yellow card) 75'	Stadium: Idrottsparken; Attendance: 4,687; Referee: Michael Lerjéus

25 August 2008 20	AIK	2–2	Hammarby	Stockholm
20:00 CEST (UTC+2)	Obolo 23'; Walker (yellow card) 78'; Jonsson 85' (pen.)	Report	Traoré (yellow card) 8'; Chanko (yellow card) 44'; Söderström 49'; Monteiro (yellow card) 84'; Sleyman 89'	Stadium: Råsunda Stadion; Attendance: 23,011; Referee: Martin Hansson

30 August 2008 21	Trelleborg	2–0	AIK	Trelleborg
16:00 CEST (UTC+2)	Bengtsson 16'; Melander (yellow card) 44'; Drugge 86'	Report	Ortiz (yellow card) 17'; Tjernström (yellow card) 35'	Stadium: Vångavallen; Attendance: 1,845; Referee: Åke Andreasson

13 September 2008 22	AIK	0–0	IFK Göteborg	Stockholm
12:30 CEST (UTC+2)	Walker (yellow card) 13'; Pavey (yellow card) 51'	Report	Olsson (yellow card) 6'; Bjärsmyr (yellow card) 27'; Wernbloom (yellow card) 50' (yellow-red card) 86'	Stadium: Råsunda Stadion; Attendance: 12,417; Referee: Markus Strömbergsson

24 September 2008 23	Djurgården	1–1	AIK	Stockholm
20:00 CEST (UTC+2)	Jonson (yellow card) 7'; Oremo 11'; Sjölund (yellow card) 78'; Rajalakso (yellow card) 88'	Report	Rubarth (yellow card) 64'; Johansson (yellow card) 78'; Jagne 90+1' (yellow card) 90+2'	Stadium: Råsunda Stadium; Attendance: 22,312; Referee: Stefan Johannesson

28 September 2008 24	AIK	1–1	Gefle	Stockholm
17:00 CEST (UTC+2)	Obolo 17'; Pavey (yellow card) 90+1'	Report	Berggren 59'	Stadium: Råsunda Stadion; Attendance: 9,383; Referee: Sven-Martin Åkesson

5 October 2008 25	Halmstad	2–1	AIK	Halmstad
15:00 CEST (UTC+2)	Rosén 66'; Jönsson 79'	Report	Tjernström (yellow card) 61'; Johansson 68'; Rubarth (yellow card) 69'	Stadium: Örjans Vall; Attendance: 2,874; Referee: Michael Lerjéus

18 October 2008 26	AIK	2–0	IFK Norrköping	Stockholm
14:00 CEST (UTC+2)	Obolo 10'; Mendes (yellow card) 51' (goal) 82'	Report		Stadium: Råsunda Stadion; Attendance: 8,662; Referee: Jonas Eriksson

22 October 2008 27	Malmö FF	1–0	AIK	Malmö
19:00 CEST (UTC+2)	Aubynn 56'	Report	Özkan (yellow card) 20'; Walker (yellow card) 68'	Stadium: Malmö Stadion; Attendance: 7,072; Referee: Tobias Mattsson

27 October 2008 28	AIK	2–1	Örebro	Stockholm
19:00 CET (UTC+1)	Obolo 49'; Pavey 56' (yellow card) 66'; Johansson (yellow card) 58'; Atta (yellow card) 81'	Report	Bassombeng (yellow card) 6'; Rodevåg 12'; Nordback (yellow card) 43'; Wowoah (yellow card) 81'	Stadium: Råsunda Stadion; Attendance: 7,420; Referee: Stefan Johannesson

2 November 2008 29	AIK	3–1	Helsingborg	Stockholm
15:00 CET (UTC+1)	Burgić (yellow card) 43' (goal) 56', 64'; Atta (yellow card) 63'; Özkan 68'	Report	Holmqvist 84'; Andersson (yellow card) 89'	Stadium: Råsunda Stadion; Attendance: 8,933; Referee: Markus Strömbergsson

9 November 2008 30	GAIS	0–2	AIK	Gothenburg
15:00 CET (UTC+1)		Report	Özkan 12'; Obolo 38'; Ortiz (yellow card) 63'	Stadium: Ullevi; Attendance: 2,674; Referee: Michael Lerjéus

=== Svenska Cupen ===
1 May 2008 Second Round	IFK Malmö	0–2	AIK	Enköping
17:00 CEST (UTC+2)	Mullici (yellow card) 63'; Sudic (yellow card) 65'	Report	Stephenson 29'; Valdemarín 31' (pen.); Ortiz (yellow card) 63'	Stadium: Enavallen; Attendance: 702; Referee: Andreas Ekberg

18 May 2008 Third Round	AIK	0–1	Landskrona BoIS	Gävle
15:00 CEST (UTC+2)		Report	Persson (yellow card) 81'; Cederqvist 90+1'	Stadium: Strömvallen; Attendance: 181; Referee: Keijo Hyvärinen

== Squad statistics ==
As of match played 9 November 2008

=== Appearances and goals ===
No.	Pos	Nat	Player	Total		Allsvenskan		Svenska Cupen	
No.	Pos	Nat	Player	Apps	Goals	Apps	Goals	Apps	Goals
1	GK	(Finland) FIN	Tomi Maanoja	12	0	12	0	0	0
2	DF	(Sweden) SWE	Patrik Bojent	14	0	13+1	0	0	0
3	DF	(Sweden) SWE	Per Karlsson	25	0	24+1	0	0	0
4	DF	(Sweden) SWE	Nils-Eric Johansson	29	1	28	1	1	0
5	MF	(Argentina) ARG	Jorge Ortiz	29	1	23+5	1	1	0
6	DF	(Sweden) SWE	Walid Atta	12	0	10+1	0	0+1	0
7	MF	(Sweden) SWE	Bojan Djordjic	14	0	7+6	0	1	0
8	MF	(Sweden) SWE	Daniel Tjernström	26	0	19+7	0	0	0
9	FW	(Slovenia) SVN	Miran Burgić	25	5	13+11	5	1	0
10	FW	(Argentina) ARG	Iván Obolo	30	10	30	10	0	0
14	MF	(England) ENG	Kenny Pavey	21	2	17+3	2	1	0
15	MF	(Sweden) SWE	Kevin Walker	12	0	5+7	0	0	0
16	DF	(Sweden) SWE	Pierre Bengtsson	19	0	17+1	0	1	0
17	FW	(The Gambia) GAM	Saihou Jagne	19	3	6+13	3	0	0
18	DF	(Sweden) SWE	Markus Jonsson	19	1	19	1	0	0
19	MF	(Uruguay) URU	Jorge Anchén	15	3	9+6	3	0	0
22	GK	(Sweden) SWE	Nicklas Bergh	7	0	6	0	1	0
23	MF	(Sweden) SWE	Mats Rubarth	18	0	12+5	0	0+1	0
25	MF	(Sweden) SWE	Yussuf Saleh	4	0	2+2	0	0	0
26	FW	(Brazil) BRA	Daniel Mendes	23	4	13+9	4	0+1	0
29	MF	(Sweden) SWE	Gabriel Özkan	11	2	9+1	2	1	0
Players away on loan:
1	GK	(Sweden) SWE	Daniel Örlund	12	0	12	0	0	0
Players who appeared for AIK but left during the season:
11	FW	(Argentina) ARG	Lucas Valdemarín	7	2	4+2	1	1	1
13	DF	(Sweden) SWE	Daniel Arnefjord	7	0	5+1	0	1	0
20	MF	(Jamaica) JAM	Khari Stephenson	8	2	2+5	1	1	1
30	MF	(Liberia) LBR	Dulee Johnson	13	2	13	2	0	0

=== Goal scorers ===
Place	Position	Nation	Number	Name	Allsvenskan	Svenska Cupen	Total
1	FW	(Argentina)	10	Iván Obolo	10	0	10
2	FW	(Slovenia)	9	Miran Burgić	5	0	5
3	FW	(Brazil)	26	Daniel Mendes	4	0	4
4	MF	(Uruguay)	19	Jorge Anchén	3	0	3
4	FW	(The Gambia)	17	Saihou Jagne	3	0	3
6	MF	(England)	14	Kenny Pavey	2	0	2
6	MF	(Liberia)	30	Dulee Johnson	2	0	2
6	MF	(Sweden)	29	Gabriel Özkan	2	0	2
6	MF	(Jamaica)	20	Khari Stephenson	1	1	2
6	FW	(Argentina)	11	Lucas Valdemarín	1	1	2
11	MF	(Argentina)	5	Jorge Ortiz	1	0	1
11	DF	(Sweden)	18	Markus Jonsson	1	0	1
11	DF	(Sweden)	4	Nils-Eric Johansson	1	0	1
TOTALS					36	2	38

=== Clean sheets ===
Place	Position	Nation	Number	Name	Allsvenskan	Svenska Cupen	Total
1	GK	(Sweden)	1	Daniel Örlund	4	0	4
1	GK	(Sweden)	22	Nicklas Bergh	3	1	4
3	GK	(Finland)	1	Tomi Maanoja	3	0	3
TOTALS					10	1	11

=== Disciplinary record ===
Number	Nation	Position	Name	Allsvenskan		Svenska Cupen		Total	
Number	Nation	Position	Name	Booked	Sent off (straight red)	Booked	Sent off (straight red)	Booked	Sent off (straight red)
4	(Sweden)	DF	Nils-Eric Johansson	7	0	0	0	7	0
5	(Argentina)	MF	Jorge Ortiz	5	0	1	0	6	0
6	(Sweden)	DF	Walid Atta	3	0	0	0	3	0
7	(Sweden)	MF	Bojan Djordjic	2	0	0	0	2	0
8	(Sweden)	MF	Daniel Tjernström	4	0	0	0	4	0
9	(Sweden)	FW	Miran Burgić	1	0	0	0	1	0
14	(England)	MF	Kenny Pavey	8	1	0	0	8	1
15	(Sweden)	MF	Kevin Walker	3	0	0	0	3	0
16	(Sweden)	DF	Pierre Bengtsson	3	0	0	0	3	0
17	(The Gambia)	FW	Saihou Jagne	2	0	0	0	2	0
18	(Sweden)	DF	Markus Jonsson	1	0	0	0	1	0
19	(Uruguay)	MF	Jorge Anchén	1	0	0	0	1	0
22	(Sweden)	GK	Nicklas Bergh	1	0	0	0	1	0
23	(Sweden)	MF	Mats Rubarth	5	0	0	0	5	0
26	(Brazil)	FW	Daniel Mendes	5	0	0	0	5	0
29	(Sweden)	MF	Gabriel Özkan	1	0	0	0	1	0
Players away on loan:
Players who left AIK during the season:
11	(Argentina)	FW	Lucas Valdemarín	1	0	0	0	1	0
13	(Sweden)	DF	Daniel Arnefjord	3	1	0	0	3	1
20	(Jamaica)	MF	Khari Stephenson	2	1	0	0	2	1
Total				58	3	1	0	59	3
