= 2013–14 F.C. Copenhagen season =

F.C. Copenhagen
2013–14 season
- Chairman: John Dueholm
- Manager: Ariël Jacobs; Ståle Solbakken
- Danish Superliga: 2nd
- Danish Cup: Runners-up
- UEFA Champions League: Group stage
- Top goalscorer: League: Igor Vetokele (12); All: Igor Vetokele (14)
- Highest home attendance: 37,241 (vs Juventus, 17 September 2013)
- Lowest home attendance: 6,131 (vs OB, 31 October 2013)
- Average home league attendance: 17,825
| Home colours | Away colours |

This article shows statistics of individual players for the football club F.C. Copenhagen. It also lists all matches that F.C. Copenhagen played in the 2013–14 season.

== Players ==
=== Squad information ===
This section show the squad as currently, considering all players who are confirmedly moved in and out (see section Players in / out).

| N | Pos. | Nat. | Name | Age | EU | Since | App | Goals | Ends | Transfer fee | Notes |
|---|---|---|---|---|---|---|---|---|---|---|---|
| 1 | GK | (Denmark) | K. Christensen | 47 | EU | 2010 | 29 | 0 | 2015 | Undisclosed | |
| 2 | RB | (Denmark) | L. Jacobsen | 47 | EU | 2011 | 263 | 5 | 2014 | Free | |
| 3 | LB | (Sweden) | Bengtsson | 38 | EU | 2011 (Winter) | 129 | 4 | 2014 | Undisclosed | |
| 4 | CB | (Denmark) | Stadsgaard | 41 | EU | 2012 (Winter) | 74 | 2 | 2016 | Free | |
| 5 | CB | (Sweden) | Mellberg | 49 | EU | 2013 | 29 | 4 | 2015 | Free | |
| 6 | CM | (Brazil) | Claudemir | 38 | Non-EU | 2010 | 162 | 13 | 2015 | DKK 7m | |
| 7 | CF | (Norway) | Abdellaoue | 38 | EU | 2012 (Winter) | 19 | 5 | 2016 | Undisclosed | |
| 8 | CM | (Denmark) | Delaney | 35 | EU | 2009 | 136 | 7 | 2017 | Youth system | |
| 9 | CF | (Belgium) | Vetokele | 34 | EU | 2012 | 54 | 19 | 2016 | DKK 8m | |
| 11 | LW | (Brazil) | Santin | 45 | Non-EU | 2008 | 220 | 84 | 2014 | DKK 15m | |
| 11 | ST | (Denmark) | Cornelius | 33 | EU | 2014 | 62 | 26 | 2018 | DKK 27m | |
| 12 | ST | (Nigeria) | Adi | 36 | EU | 2013 | 13 | 3 | 2017 | Undisclosed | |
| 13 | LW | (Senegal) | Diouf | 40 | EU | 2011 | 34 | 6 | 2015 | DKK 18m | |
| 15 | CB | (Denmark) | M. Jakobsen | 40 | EU | 2012 | 9 | 0 | 2016 | Undisclosed | |
| 15 | CB | (Austria) | Margreitter | 37 | EU | 2013 | 21 | 0 | 2014 | Loan | |
| 16 | CM | (Denmark) | T. Kristensen | 43 | EU | 2008 | 219 | 11 | 2014 | Undisclosed | |
| 17 | CB | (Iceland) | Sigurðsson | 40 | EU | 2011 | 102 | 4 | 2015 | DKK 6m | |
| 18 | LW | (Denmark) | Jørgensen | 35 | EU | 2012 | 60 | 20 | 2016 | Undisclosed | |
| 19 | RW | (Iceland) | Gíslason | 38 | EU | 2012 | 61 | 6 | 2016 | Undisclosed | |
| 21 | GK | (Sweden) | Wiland | 45 | EU | 2009 (Winter) | 191 | 0 | 2016 | DKK 8m | |
| 22 | RM | (Norway) | Braaten | 44 | EU | 2013 | 30 | 2 | 2014 | Free | |
| 23 | CF | (Germany) | Pourié | 35 | EU | 2013 | 14 | 3 | 2017 | DKK 10m | |
| 24 | AM | (Denmark) | Toutouh | 34 | EU | 2011 | 32 | 3 | 2017 | Free | |
| 25 | RB | (Denmark) | Remmer | 33 | EU | 2012 | 25 | 0 | 2017 | Youth system | |
| 30 | RM | (Costa Rica) | Bolaños | 42 | Non-EU | 2010 | 141 | 18 | 2014 | DKK 7m | |
| 31 | GK | (Denmark) | Busk | 33 | EU | 2012 | 7 | 0 | 2017 | Youth system | |
| 32 | SS | (Denmark) | Amankwaa | 32 | EU | 2013 | 33 | 1 | 2017 | Youth system | |
| 33 | ST | (Denmark) | Felfel | 30 | EU | 2014 | 2 | 0 | 2016 | Youth system | |
| 34 | RB | (Denmark) | Aaquist | 31 | EU | 2014 | 1 | 0 | ? | Youth system | |

- Last updated: 18 May
- Source: F.C. Copenhagen, players' Wikipedia articles, fck_kontrakter (for contract endings)
- Ordered by squad number.

=== Squad stats ===
| | | | | Total | | | UEFA Champions League | | Danish Superliga | | Danish Cup | |
| No. | Pos. | Nat. | Name | Sts | App | Gls | App | Gls | App | Gls | App | Gls |
|---|---|---|---|---|---|---|---|---|---|---|---|---|
| 21 | GK | (Sweden) | Wiland | 39 | 39 | | 6 | | 30 | | 3 | |
| 2 | RB | (Denmark) | L. Jacobsen | 36 | 35 | 1 | 6 | | 26 | 1 | 3 | |
| 4 | CB | (Denmark) | Stadsgaard | 22 | 22 | | | | 18 | | 4 | |
| 5 | CB | (Sweden) | Mellberg | 29 | 29 | 4 | 6 | 1 | 22 | 3 | 1 | |
| 3 | LB | (Sweden) | Bengtsson | 41 | 43 | 3 | 6 | | 31 | 1 | 6 | 2 |
| 30 | RM | (Costa Rica) | Bolaños | 22 | 31 | 3 | 6 | | 22 | 3 | 3 | |
| 6 | CM | (Brazil) | Claudemir | 37 | 40 | 2 | 6 | 1 | 30 | 1 | 4 | |
| 16 | CM | (Denmark) | T. Kristensen | 23 | 35 | 4 | 3 | | 26 | 3 | 6 | 1 |
| 8 | CM | (Denmark) | Delaney | 35 | 42 | 3 | 6 | | 31 | 3 | 5 | |
| 19 | RW | (Iceland) | Gíslason | 32 | 41 | 5 | 6 | | 29 | 4 | 6 | 1 |
| 9 | CF | (Belgium) | Vetokele | 32 | 35 | 15 | 2 | | 29 | 13 | 4 | 2 |
| 22 | RM | (Norway) | Braaten | 17 | 30 | 2 | 4 | 1 | 23 | 1 | 3 | |
| 24 | AM | (Denmark) | Toutouh | 15 | 28 | 3 | 6 | | 18 | 2 | 4 | 1 |
| 18 | LW | (Denmark) | Jørgensen | 21 | 24 | 7 | 6 | 1 | 16 | 6 | 2 | |
| 17 | CB | (Iceland) | Sigurðsson | 22 | 22 | | 6 | | 14 | | 2 | |
| 15 | CB | (Austria) | Margreitter | 15 | 21 | | 2 | | 13 | | 6 | |
| 32 | SS | (Denmark) | Amankwaa | 5 | 20 | | 1 | | 15 | | 4 | |
| 25 | RB | (Denmark) | Remmer | 14 | 19 | | 1 | | 14 | | 4 | |
| 11 | ST | (Denmark) | Cornelius | 16 | 16 | 6 | | | 13 | 5 | 3 | 1 |
| 11 | LW | (Brazil) | Santin | 6 | 14 | 5 | | | 12 | 2 | 2 | 3 |
| 23 | CF | (Germany) | Pourié | 4 | 14 | 3 | 2 | | 9 | 1 | 3 | 2 |
| 12 | ST | (Nigeria) | Adi | 8 | 13 | 3 | 3 | | 9 | 3 | 1 | |
| 31 | GK | (Denmark) | Busk | 5 | 6 | | | | 3 | | 3 | |
| 33 | ST | (Denmark) | Felfel | | 2 | | | | 2 | | | |
| 1 | GK | (Denmark) | K. Christensen | 1 | 1 | | | | 1 | | | |
| 35 | CM | (Denmark) | Wohlgemuth | 1 | 1 | | | | | | 1 | |
| 7 | CF | (Norway) | Abdellaoue | | | | | | | | | |
| 13 | LW | (Senegal) | Diouf | | | | | | | | | |
| 15 | LB | (Denmark) | M. Jakobsen | | | | | | | | | |
| 34 | RB | (Denmark) | Aaquist | | | | | | | | | |

Last updated: 18 May
Source: FCK.dk
Ordered by Starting 11 then appearances
0 shown as blank

=== Players in / out ===
==== In ====
| No. | Pos. | Nat. | Name | Age | EU | Moving from | Type | Transfer window | Ends | Transfer fee | Source |
|---|---|---|---|---|---|---|---|---|---|---|---|
| 32 | SS | (Denmark) | Amankwaa | 19 | EU | Youth system | Promoted | Summer | 2015 | Youth system | bold.dk |
| 7 | CF | (Norway) | Abdellaoue | 24 | EU | Vålerenga (Norway) | End of loan | Summer | 2016 | n/a | |
| 8 | CM | (Norway) | Grindheim | 29 | EU | Vålerenga (Norway) | End of loan | Summer | 2014 | n/a | |
| 24 | AM | (Denmark) | Toutouh | 20 | EU | Esbjerg fB | End of loan | Summer | 2014 | n/a | |
| 5 | CB | (Sweden) | Mellberg | 35 | EU | Villarreal (Spain) | Transfer | Summer | 2015 | Free | FCK.dk |
| 23 | CF | (Germany) | Pourié | 22 | EU | Silkeborg IF | Transfer | Summer | 2017 | DKK 9,500,000 | FCK.dk |
| 12 | CF | (Nigeria) | Adi | 22 | EU | Trenčín (Slovakia) | Transfer | Summer | 2017 | DKK 11,000,000 | FCK.dk |
| 22 | RM | (Norway) | Braaten | 31 | EU | Toulouse (France) | Transfer | Summer | 2014 | Free | FCK.dk |
| 15 | CB | (Austria) | Margreitter | 24 | EU | Wolverhampton Wanderers (England) | Loan | Summer | 2014 | n/a | FCK.dk |
| 13 | LW | (Senegal) | Diouf | 27 | EU | Esbjerg fB | End of loan | Winter | 2015 | n/a | |
| 34 | RB | (Denmark) | Aaquist | 19 | EU | Youth system | Promoted | Winter | ? | Youth system | |
| 11 | ST | (Denmark) | Cornelius | 20 | EU | Cardiff City (Wales) | Transfer | Winter | 2018 | DKK 27,000,000 | FCK.dk |
| 33 | RB | (Denmark) | Felfel | 18 | EU | Youth system | Promoted | Winter | ? | Youth system | FCK.dk |

==== Out ====
| No. | Pos. | Nat. | Name | Age | EU | Moving to | Type | Transfer window | Transfer fee | Source |
|---|---|---|---|---|---|---|---|---|---|---|
| 5 | CB | (Iceland) | Ottesen | 29 | EU | Ural Sverdlovsk Oblast (Russia) | Contract ended | Summer | Free | FC-Ural.ru |
| 12 | CM | (Denmark) | Jensen | 34 | EU | SønderjyskE | Contract ended | Summer | Free | SoenderjyskE.dk |
| 29 | CF | (Denmark) | Cornelius | 20 | EU | Cardiff City (Wales) | Transfer | Summer | DKK 75,000,000 | CardiffCityFC.co.uk |
| 8 | CM | (Norway) | Grindheim | 29 | EU | Vålerenga (Norway) | Transfer | Summer | Undisclosed | VIF-Fotball.no |
| 20 | AM | (Denmark) | Vingaard | 28 | EU | Nordsjælland | Transfer | Summer | Undisclosed | FCN.dk |
| 15 | CB | (Denmark) | Jakobsen | 27 | EU | Nordsjælland | Loan | Summer | n/a | FCN.dk |
| 13 | LW | (Senegal) | Diouf | 27 | EU | Esbjerg fB | Loan | Summer | n/a | EfB.dk |
| 7 | CF | (Norway) | Abdellaoue | 25 | EU | OB | Loan | Summer | n/a | OB.dk |
| 11 | LW | (Brazil) | Santin | 32 | Non-EU | APOEL (Cyprus) | Transfer | Winter | Undisclosed | APOELFC.com.cy |
| 17 | CB | (Iceland) | Sigurðsson | 27 | EU | Krasnodar (Russia) | Transfer | Winter | DKK 37,500,000 | FCKrasnodar.ru |
| 15 | CB | (Denmark) | Jakobsen | 28 | EU | Esbjerg fB | Transfer | Winter | Undisclosed | EfB.dk |
| 23 | CF | (Germany) | Pourié | 23 | EU | Zulte Waregem (Belgium) | Loan | Winter | n/a | ESSEVEE.be |
| 13 | LW | (Senegal) | Diouf | 27 | EU | Molde (Norway) | Transfer | Winter | Undisclosed | MoldeFK.no |
| 12 | CF | (Nigeria) | Adi | 23 | EU | Portland Timbers (United States) | Loan | Summer | n/a | Timbers.com |

Last updated: 13 May

== Club ==
=== Coaching staff ===
| Position | Staff |
|---|---|
| Head coach | (Belgium) Ariël Jacobs (until 21 August) |
| Head coach | (Norway) Ståle Solbakken (from 21 August) |
| Assistant coach | (Denmark) Brian Riemer |
| Goalkeeping coach | (Netherlands) Anton Scheutjens |
| Fitness coach | (Denmark) Anders Storskov |

Last updated: 21 July
Source: F.C. Copenhagen

=== Kit ===
Supplier: adidas
Sponsor(s): Carlsberg

| Home | Away | Third (2013) | Third (2014) |

Source: FCKMegastore.dk

=== Other information ===
| Chairman | (Denmark) John Dueholm |
| Sport director | (Denmark) Carsten V. Jensen (until 28 April) |
| Technical director | (Denmark) Johan Lange (from 2 May) |
| Club secretary | (Denmark) Daniel Rommedahl |
| Ground (capacity and dimensions) | Parken (38,065 / 105x68 m) |

Updated to match played 30 June
Source: F.C. Copenhagen and Parken Stadium

== Competitions ==
=== Overall ===
| Competition | Started round | Current position / round | Final position / round | First match | Last match |
|---|---|---|---|---|---|
| Danish Superliga | — | — | 2nd | 21 July | 18 May |
| UEFA Champions League | Group stage | — | Group stage | 17 September | 10 December |
| Danish Cup | Third round | — | Final | 25 September | 15 May |

Updated to match played 18 May
Source: Competitions

=== Danish Superliga ===
==== Classification ====
| Pos | Team | Pld | W | D | L | GF | GA | GD | Pts | Qualification or relegation |
|---|---|---|---|---|---|---|---|---|---|---|
| 1 | AaB (C) | 33 | 18 | 8 | 7 | 60 | 38 | +22 | 62 | Qualification for the Champions League third qualifying round |
| 2 | Copenhagen | 33 | 15 | 11 | 7 | 54 | 38 | +16 | 56 | Qualification for the Champions League third qualifying round |
| 3 | Midtjylland | 33 | 16 | 7 | 10 | 61 | 38 | +23 | 55 | Qualification for the Europa League play-off round |
| 4 | Brøndby | 33 | 13 | 13 | 7 | 47 | 38 | +9 | 52 | Qualification for the Europa League third qualifying round |
| 5 | Esbjerg fB | 33 | 13 | 9 | 11 | 47 | 38 | +9 | 48 | Qualification for the Europa League second qualifying round |

Source: Danish Football Association (in Danish)
Rules for classification: 1) points; 2) goal difference; 3) number of goals scored.
(C) Champions

==== Results summary ====
| Overall | | | | | | | | Home | | | | | | Away | | | | | |
| Pld | W | D | L | GF | GA | GD | Pts | W | D | L | GF | GA | GD | W | D | L | GF | GA | GD |
|---|---|---|---|---|---|---|---|---|---|---|---|---|---|---|---|---|---|---|---|
| 33 | 15 | 11 | 7 | 54 | 38 | +16 | 56 | 9 | 6 | 2 | 31 | 20 | +11 | 6 | 5 | 5 | 23 | 18 | +5 |

Last updated: 18 May.

==== Results by round ====
| Round | 1 | 2 | 3 | 4 | 5 | 6 | 7 | 8 | 9 | 10 | 11 | 12 | 13 | 14 | 15 | 16 | 17 | 18 | 19 | 20 | 21 | 22 | 23 | 24 | 25 | 26 | 27 | 28 | 29 | 30 | 31 | 32 | 33 |
|---|---|---|---|---|---|---|---|---|---|---|---|---|---|---|---|---|---|---|---|---|---|---|---|---|---|---|---|---|---|---|---|---|---|
| Ground | A | A | H | A | H | H | A | H | H | A | H | H | A | H | A | H | A | H | A | H | A | A | H | A | H | H | A | H | A | H | A | A | H |
| Result | L | L | L | D | D | D | W | D | W | L | W | W | D | W | D | W | W | W | D | L | W | D | D | L | W | W | W | D | L | D | W | W | W |

Updated to match(es) played on 18 May. Source: Competitive matches
A = Away; H = Home; W = Win; D = Draw; L = Loss

=== UEFA Champions League ===
==== Group B ====
| Pos | Team | Pld | W | D | L | GF | GA | GD | Pts | Qualification | RMA | GAL | JUV | CPH |
|---|---|---|---|---|---|---|---|---|---|---|---|---|---|---|
| 1 | (Spain) Real Madrid | 6 | 5 | 1 | 0 | 20 | 5 | +15 | 16 | Advance to knockout phase | — | 4–1 | 2–1 | 4–0 |
| 2 | (Turkey) Galatasaray | 6 | 2 | 1 | 3 | 8 | 14 | −6 | 7 | Advance to knockout phase | 1–6 | — | 1–0 | 3–1 |
| 3 | (Italy) Juventus | 6 | 1 | 3 | 2 | 9 | 9 | 0 | 6 | Transfer to Europa League | 2–2 | 2–2 | — | 3–1 |
| 4 | (Denmark) Copenhagen | 6 | 1 | 1 | 4 | 4 | 13 | −9 | 4 | | 0–2 | 1–0 | 1–1 | — |

Source: UEFA

==== Results summary ====
| Overall | | | | | | | | Home | | | | | | Away | | | | | |
| Pld | W | D | L | GF | GA | GD | Pts | W | D | L | GF | GA | GD | W | D | L | GF | GA | GD |
|---|---|---|---|---|---|---|---|---|---|---|---|---|---|---|---|---|---|---|---|
| 6 | 1 | 1 | 4 | 4 | 13 | −9 | 4 | 1 | 1 | 1 | 2 | 3 | −1 | 0 | 0 | 3 | 2 | 10 | −8 |

Last updated: 10 December.

== Matches ==
=== Competitive ===
| Game | Date | Tournament | Round | Ground | Opponent | Score^{1} | TV | Report |
|---|---|---|---|---|---|---|---|---|
| 1 | 21 July | Danish Superliga | 1 | A | AaB | 1–2 | TV3+ | Report / Report link; Kick off / 19:00 CEST; Attendance / 7,062; Referee / Michael Tykgaard; Copenhagen / AaB; Bolaños (yellow card) 38'; Bengtsson 48'; Santin (yellow card) 66' / Augustinussen (yellow card) 21'; Curth 46'; Nielsen (yellow card) 47'; Frederiksen 70' |
| 2 | 28 July | Danish Superliga | 2 | A | Midtjylland | 0–1 | TV3+ | Report / Report link; Kick off / 19:00 CEST; Attendance / 8,759; Referee / Kenn Hansen; Copenhagen / Midtjylland; Delaney (yellow card) 28' / Igboun (yellow card) 31'; Andersson (yellow card) 46'; Olsen (yellow card) 90' |
| 3 | 4 August | Danish Superliga | 3 | H | Randers FC | 1–3 | Canal 9 | Report / Report link; Kick off / 17:00 CEST; Attendance / 12,956; Referee / Anders Poulsen; Copenhagen / Randers FC; Delaney 24' / Schwartz 35'; Sørensen (yellow card) 68'; Borring 75'; Brock-Madsen 79' |
| 4 | 11 August | Danish Superliga | 4 | A | Nordsjælland | 2–2 | TV3+ | Report / Report link; Kick off / 19:00 CEST; Attendance / 7,969; Referee / Michael Johansen; Copenhagen / Nordsjælland; Gíslason 18'; Pourié (yellow card) 27'; Wiland (yellow card) 33'; Kristensen 63' (pen.); Delaney (yellow card) 90' / O'Brien (yellow card) 29'; Vingaard 34' (pen.); Christiansen (yellow card) 46'; Nordstrand 83' |
| 5 | 18 August | Danish Superliga | 5 | H | AGF | 1–1 | TV3+ | Report / Report link; Kick off / 19:00 CEST; Attendance / 13,316; Referee / Jens Maae; Copenhagen / AGF; Jørgensen 45'; Delaney (yellow card) 69' / Sloth 17'; Kure (yellow card) 37'; Povlsen (yellow card) 48'; Kirkeskov (yellow card) 48'; Devdariani (yellow card) 82' |
| 6 | 25 August | Danish Superliga | 6 | H | Vestsjælland (Denmark) | 1–1 | Canal 9 | Report / Report link; Kick off / 17:00 CEST; Attendance / 18,778; Referee / Mads-Kristoffer Kristoffersen; Copenhagen / Vestsjælland; Adi 6'; Claudemir (yellow card) 36'; Santin (yellow card) 90' / Festersen (yellow card) 14'; Bertolt (yellow card) 37'; Hansen (yellow card) 62'; Festersen (yellow card) 68'; Lumb (yellow card) 78' |
| 7 | 1 September | Danish Superliga | 7 | A | Viborg FF | 4–1 | Canal 9 | Report / Report link; Kick off / 17:00 CEST; Attendance / 8,212; Referee / Kenn Hansen; Copenhagen / Viborg FF; Claudemir 21'; Mellberg 32'; Delaney (yellow card) 57'; Vetokele 65'; Adi 79' / Bang (yellow card) 37'; Mensah 81' |
| 8 | 14 September | Danish Superliga | 8 | H | Esbjerg fB | 1–1 | Canal 9 | Report / Report link; Kick off / 17:00 CEST; Attendance / 20,697; Referee / Jens Maae; Copenhagen / Esbjerg fB; Adi (yellow card) 60'; Sigurðsson (red card) 77'; Santin 85' / J. Ankersen 19'; Diouf (yellow card) 33'; J. Ankersen (yellow card) 80'; P. Ankersen (yellow card) 83' |
| 9 | 17 September | UEFA Champions League | Group stage | H | Juventus (Italy) | 1–1 | TV3+ | Report / Report link; Kick off / 20:45 CEST; Attendance / 36,524; Referee / Ivan Bebek; Copenhagen / Juventus; Jørgensen 14'; Mellberg (yellow card) 45'; Bengtsson (yellow card) 49' / Peluso (yellow card) 49'; Lichtsteiner (yellow card) 49'; Quagliarella 54'; Vidal (yellow card) 90' |
| 10 | 22 September | Danish Superliga | 9 | H | OB | 2–1 | TV3+ | Report / Report link; Kick off / 19:00 CEST; Attendance / 11,008; Referee / Mads-Kristoffer Kristoffersen; Copenhagen / OB; Braaten (yellow card) 9'; Claudemir (yellow card) 51'; Delaney 74'; Delaney (yellow card) 81'; Vetokele 83'; Gíslason (yellow card) 87' / Falk (yellow card) 14'; Larsen 24'; Skúlason (yellow card) 54'; O'Brien (yellow card) 67' |
| 11 | 25 September | Danish Cup | Third round | A | Hvidovre IF (Denmark) | 4–2 | TV3+ | Report / Report link; Kick off / 20:30 CEST; Attendance / 5,404; Referee / Anders Poulsen; Copenhagen / Hvidovre IF; Santin 1'; Toutouh 13'; Vetokele 51'; Pourié 61' / Dau 40'; Andersen 86'; Lerager (yellow card) 90'; Hebo (yellow card) 90' |
| 12 | 28 September | Danish Superliga | 10 | A | Brøndby | 2–3 | TV3+ | Report / Report link; Kick off / 16:00 CEST; Attendance / 21,798; Referee / Jakob Kehlet; Copenhagen / Brøndby; Adi 63' (pen.); Toutouh 68'; Bengtsson (red card) 79' / Szymanowski 25' (pen.); Szymanowski 45'; Makienok 48'; Durmisi (yellow card) 79'; Zohore (yellow card) 81' |
| 13 | 2 October | UEFA Champions League | Group stage | A (Spain) | Real Madrid (Spain) | 0–4 | TV3+ | Report / Report link; Kick off / 20:45 CEST; Attendance / 69,347; Referee / Matej Jug; Copenhagen / Real Madrid; Braaten (yellow card) 63'; Delaney (yellow card) 88' / Ronaldo 21'; Modrić (yellow card) 44'; Ronaldo 65'; Di María 71'; Di María 90' |
| 14 | 6 October | Danish Superliga | 11 | H | SønderjyskE | 2–1 | Canal 9 | Report / Report link; Kick off / 17:00 CEST; Attendance / 12,258; Referee / Michael Johansen; Copenhagen / SønderjyskE; Gíslason 29'; Jørgensen (yellow card) 65'; Jørgensen 66'; Gíslason (yellow card) 85' / Hansen (yellow card) 67'; Luque 90' |
| 15 | 20 October | Danish Superliga | 12 | H | AaB | 3–0 | TV3+ | Report / Report link; Kick off / 19:00 CEST; Attendance / 13,693; Referee / Michael Tykgaard; Copenhagen / AaB; Jørgensen 43'; Nielsen 62' (o.g.); Jørgensen 63'; Vetokele 89' / Ahlmann (yellow card) 34'; Würtz (yellow card) 61'; Kusk (yellow card) 90'; Petersen (yellow card) 90' |
| 16 | 23 October | UEFA Champions League | Group stage | A (Turkey) | Galatasaray (Turkey) | 1–3 | TV3+ | Report / Report link; Kick off / 21:45 EEST; Referee / Aleksandar Stavrev; Copenhagen / Galatasaray; Delaney (yellow card) 33'; Claudemir 88' / Melo 10'; Sneijder 38'; Drogba 45' |
| 17 | 27 October | Danish Superliga | 13 | A | Randers FC | 1–1 | Canal 9 | Report / Report link; Kick off / 17:00 CET; Attendance / 5,506; Referee / Peter Rasmussen; Copenhagen / Randers FC; Jacobsen 90'; Braaten (yellow card) 90' / Bjarnason (yellow card) 15'; Brock 45'; Brock (yellow card) 90' |
| 18 | 30 October | Danish Cup | Fourth round | H | OB | 4–3 | TV3+ | Report / Report link; Kick off / 20:45 CET; Attendance / 6,131; Referee / Jens Maae; Copenhagen / OB; Santin 23'; Bengtsson 30'; Santin 54'; Pourié 67'; Santin (yellow card) 68'; Stadsgaard (yellow card) 90' / Schoop 9'; Spelmann 18'; Spelmann 52'; Ruud (yellow card) 90' |
| 19 | 2 November | Danish Superliga | 14 | H | Nordsjælland | 4–0 | Canal 9 | Report / Report link; Kick off / 15:00 CET; Attendance / 15,397; Referee / Jakob Kehlet; Copenhagen / Nordsjælland; Vetokele 52'; Vetokele 56'; Jørgensen 67' (pen.); Jørgensen 74' / Larsen (yellow card) 38' |
| 20 | 5 November | UEFA Champions League | Group stage | H | Galatasaray (Turkey) | 1–0 | TV3+ | Report / Report link; Kick off / 20:45 CET; Attendance / 36,204; Referee / Martin Atkinson; Copenhagen / Galatasaray; Braaten 6' / Riera (yellow card) 84' |
| 21 | 10 November | Danish Superliga | 15 | A | Esbjerg fB | 1–1 | Canal 9 | Report / Report link; Kick off / 17:00 CET; Attendance / 7,663; Referee / Mads-Kristoffer Kristoffersen; Copenhagen / Esbjerg fB; Claudemir (yellow card) 36'; Gíslason 69' / Mellberg 17' (o.g.); Lyng (yellow card) 40'; Andersen (yellow card) 53'; Andreasen (yellow card) 65'; Hansen (yellow card) 81' |
| 22 | 24 November | Danish Superliga | 16 | H | Viborg FF | 4–1 | Canal 9 | Report / Report link; Kick off / 17:00 CET; Attendance / 14,227; Referee / Peter Rasmussen; Copenhagen / Viborg FF; Santin 1'; Vetokele 8'; Vetokele 26'; Mellberg (yellow card) 36'; Toutouh (yellow card) 45'; Gíslason (yellow card) 65'; Toutouh 68' / Dalgaard 24'; Rømer (yellow card) 56' |
| 23 | 27 November | UEFA Champions League | Group stage | A (Italy) | Juventus (Italy) | 1–3 | TV3+ | Report / Report link; Kick off / 20:45 CET; Attendance / 35,245; Referee / Jonas Eriksson; Copenhagen / Juventus; Jacobsen (yellow card) 29'; Sigurðsson (yellow card) 33'; Mellberg 56'; Mellberg (yellow card) 60' / Vidal 29' (pen.); Vidal 61' (pen.); Vidal 63' |
| 24 | 1 December | Danish Superliga | 17 | A | Brøndby | 3–1 | TV3+ | Report / Report link; Kick off / 19:00 CET; Attendance / 21,624; Referee / Michael Tykgaard; Copenhagen / Brøndby; Vetokele 25'; Jørgensen 31'; Vetokele 34'; Remmer (yellow card) 43'; Mellberg (yellow card) 90' / Hasani 23'; Nørgaard (yellow card) 89' |
| 25 | 4 December | Danish Cup | Fifth round | A | Lyngby Boldklub | 2–1 | TV3+ | Report / Report link; Kick off / 18:00 CET; Attendance / 3,979; Referee / Mads-Kristoffer Kristoffersen; Copenhagen / Lyngby Boldklub; Pourié (yellow card) 14'; Kristensen 28' (pen.); Braaten (yellow card) 33'; Kristensen (yellow card) 49'; Bengtsson 52'; Toutouh (yellow card) 69' / Mortensen 22'; Mortensen (yellow card) 23' |
| 26 | 7 December | Danish Superliga | 18 | H | Vestsjælland (Denmark) | 1–0 | Canal 9 | Report / Report link; Kick off / 17:00 CET; Attendance / 11,179; Referee / Kenn Hansen; Copenhagen / Vestsjælland; Claudemir (yellow card) 9'; Bengtsson (yellow card) 42'; Pourié 61' / Tshibamba (yellow card) 34'; Dal Hende (yellow card) 42' |
| 27 | 10 December | UEFA Champions League | Group stage | H | Real Madrid (Spain) | 0–2 | TV3+ | Report / Report link; Kick off / 20:45 CET; Attendance / 37,241; Referee / Felix Brych; Copenhagen / Real Madrid; Delaney (yellow card) 89' / Marcelo (yellow card) 12'; Modrić 25'; Ronaldo 48'; Alonso (yellow card) 64' |
| 28 | 23 February | Danish Superliga | 19 | A | AGF | 1–1 | Canal 9 | Report / Report link; Kick off / 17:00 CET; Attendance / 9,510; Referee / Mads-Kristoffer Kristoffersen; Copenhagen / AGF; Mellberg (yellow card) 45'; Cornelius 72'; Cornelius (yellow card) 90' / Povlsen (yellow card) 28'; Nørregaard (yellow card) 40'; Lange 89' |
| 29 | 2 March | Danish Superliga | 20 | H | Midtjylland | 1–5 | TV3+ | Report / Report link; Kick off / 19:00 CET; Attendance / 20,764; Referee / Kenn Hansen; Copenhagen / Midtjylland; Mellberg 23'; Stadsgaard (yellow card) 65'; Cornelius (red card) 76' / Sviatchenko 15'; Uzochukwu (yellow card) 22'; Sisto 24'; Mellberg 40' (o.g.); Rømer (yellow card) 46'; Bach Bak (yellow card) 47'; Sisto 80'; Poulsen 82' |
| 30 | 9 March | Danish Superliga | 21 | A | OB | 1–0 | TV3+ | Report / Report link; Kick off / 19:00 CET; Attendance / 10,574; Referee / Jakob Kehlet; Copenhagen / OB; Delaney (yellow card) 18'; Vetokele 51'; Braaten (yellow card) 70' / Møller Christensen (yellow card) 56'; Busuladzic (yellow card) 81' |
| 31 | 14 March | Danish Superliga | 22 | A | SønderjyskE | 0–0 | TV3 Sport 1 | Report / Report link; Kick off / 18:30 CET; Attendance / 3,871; Referee / Peter Kjærsgaard-Andersen; Copenhagen / SønderjyskE; Stadsgaard (yellow card) 81'; Christian Bolaños (yellow card) 86' / Jensen (yellow card) 1'; Lodberg (yellow card) 35'; Songani (yellow card) 60'; Absalonsen (yellow card) 77' |
| 32 | 23 March | Danish Superliga | 23 | H | Randers FC | 1–1 | Canal 9 | Report / Report link; Kick off / 17:00 CET; Attendance / 14,507; Referee / Henning Jensen; Copenhagen / Randers FC; Cornelius 67'; Remmer (yellow card) 83' / Agesen (yellow card) 36'; Tamboura (yellow card) 62'; Fisker 79' |
| 33 | 26 March | Danish Cup | Semi-finals | H | Nordsjælland | 1–0 | TV3+ | Report / Report link; Kick off / 19:00 CET; Attendance / 8,813; Referee / Kenn Hansen; Copenhagen / Nordsjælland; Larsen 27' (o.g.); Gíslason (yellow card) 86' / Christiansen (yellow card) 33' |
| 34 | 30 March | Danish Superliga | 24 | A | AaB | 2–1 | TV3+ | Report / Report link; Kick off / 19:00 CEST; Attendance / 11,491; Referee / Kenn Hansen; Copenhagen / AaB; Stadsgaard (yellow card) 68'; Mellberg 83' / Thelander 10'; Ahlmann (yellow card) 38'; Curth (yellow card) 61'; Petersen (yellow card) 64'; Curth 85'; Bruhn (yellow card) 87' |
| 35 | 6 April | Danish Superliga | 25 | H | SønderjyskE | 2–0 | Canal 9 | Report / Report link; Kick off / 17:00 CEST; Attendance / 11,023; Referee / Michael Johansen; Copenhagen / SønderjyskE; Braaten 20'; Claudemir (yellow card) 24'; Bolaños 33'; Kristensen (yellow card) 83' / Paulsen (yellow card) 3'; Jónasson (yellow card) 69' |
| 36 | 10 April | Danish Cup | Semi-finals | A | Nordsjælland | 1–1 | TV3+ | Report / Report link; Kick off / 18:30 CET; Attendance / 4,487; Referee / Michael Johansen; Copenhagen / Nordsjælland; Vetokele (yellow card) 27'; Vetokele 59' / Tičinović 5'; Vingaard (yellow card) 31' |
| 37 | 13 April | Danish Superliga | 26 | H | AGF | 1–0 | Canal 9 | Report / Report link; Kick off / 17:00 CEST; Attendance / 15,427; Referee / Kenn Hansen; Copenhagen / AGF; Vetokele 84' / Bjørndal (yellow card) 28'; Jørgensen (yellow card) 71'; Jønsson (yellow card) 86' |
| 38 | 17 April | Danish Superliga | 27 | A | Vestsjælland (Denmark) | 1–0 | TV3 Sport 1 | Report / Report link; Kick off / 19:00 CEST; Attendance / 4,456; Referee / Dennis Mogensen; Copenhagen / Vestsjælland; Cornelius 40' (pen.); Cornelius (yellow card) 90' / Bertolt (yellow card) 76'; Nielsen (yellow card) 79' |
| 39 | 21 April | Danish Superliga | 28 | H | Esbjerg fB | 2–2 | TV3+ | Report / Report link; Kick off / 19:00 CEST; Attendance / 11,917; Referee / Michael Johansen; Copenhagen / Esbjerg fB; Vetokele 23'; Bolaños 38'; Vetokele (yellow card) 75' / Ankersen 7'; Ankersen (yellow card) 62'; Ankersen 90' (pen.) |
| 40 | 27 April | Danish Superliga | 29 | A | Nordsjælland | 0–1 | TV3+ | Report / Report link; Kick off / 19:00 CEST; Attendance / 5,416; Referee / Mads-Kristoffer Kristoffersen; Copenhagen / Nordsjælland; Claudemir (yellow card) 60' / Maxsø (yellow card) 72'; Christensen 72' (o.g.) |
| 41 | 4 May | Danish Superliga | 30 | H | Brøndby | 1–1 | TV3+ | Report / Report link; Kick off / 19:00 CEST; Attendance / 32,846; Referee / Jakob Kehlet; Copenhagen / Brøndby; Kristensen (yellow card) 44'; Delaney 90' / Ørnskov (yellow card) 27'; Núñez 73'; Makienok (yellow card) 90' |
| 42 | 8 May | Danish Superliga | 31 | A | Viborg FF | 2–0 | Canal 9 | Report / Report link; Kick off / 18:00 CEST; Attendance / 4,701; Referee / Jens Maae; Copenhagen / Viborg FF; Cornelius (yellow card) 44'; Jørgensen 81'; Kristensen 85' (pen.) / Rømer (yellow card) 29'; Poulsen (yellow card) 84' |
| 43 | 11 May | Danish Superliga | 32 | A | Midtjylland | 3–2 | Canal 9 | Report / Report link; Kick off / 17:00 CEST; Attendance / 11,021; Referee / Kenn Hansen; Copenhagen / Midtjylland; Gíslason (yellow card) 24'; Gíslason 45'; Margreitter (yellow card) 45'; Cornelius 52'; Margreitter (yellow card) 74' (yellow-red card); Bolaños 90' / Rasmussen 13' (pen.); Rømer (yellow card) 18'; Poulsen (yellow card) 26'; Igboun (yellow card) 45'; Rasmussen 63' |
| 44 | 15 May | Danish Cup | Final | N | AaB | 2–4 | TV3+ | Report / Report link; Kick off / 20:00 CEST; Attendance / 27,824; Referee / Jakob Kehlet; Copenhagen / AaB; Stadsgaard (yellow card) 7'; Cornelius 18'; Braaten (yellow card) 29'; Gíslason 89' / Ahlmann (yellow card) 7'; Würtz (yellow card) 14'; Thelander 41'; Thelander 44'; Ahlmann 72'; Frederiksen 74' |
| 45 | 18 May | Danish Superliga | 33 | H | OB | 3–2 | Canal 9 | Report / Report link; Kick off / 17:00 CEST; Attendance / 17,251; Referee / Michael Tykgaard; Copenhagen / OB; Vetokele 23'; Cornelius 61'; Kristensen 86' / Wiland 14' (o.g.); Vadócz (yellow card) 55'; Spelmann 78'; Spelmann (yellow card) 80' |

Last updated: 18 May
Source: FCK.dk
^{1}F.C. Copenhagen goals come first.
National flags for Ground and Opponent columns are only shown when different from that of F.C. Copenhagen.
M = Match; Ground: H = Home, A = Away, N = Neutral, HR = Home replacement, AR = Away replacement.
