= Cakić =

Cakić (Serbian Cyrillic: Цакић) is a Serbian surname. Notable people with the surname include:

- Mihajlo Cakić (born 1990), Serbian footballer
- Riki Cakić (born 1990), Bosnian-born Swedish footballer
