= Olof Mellberg =

Swedish footballer (born 1977)

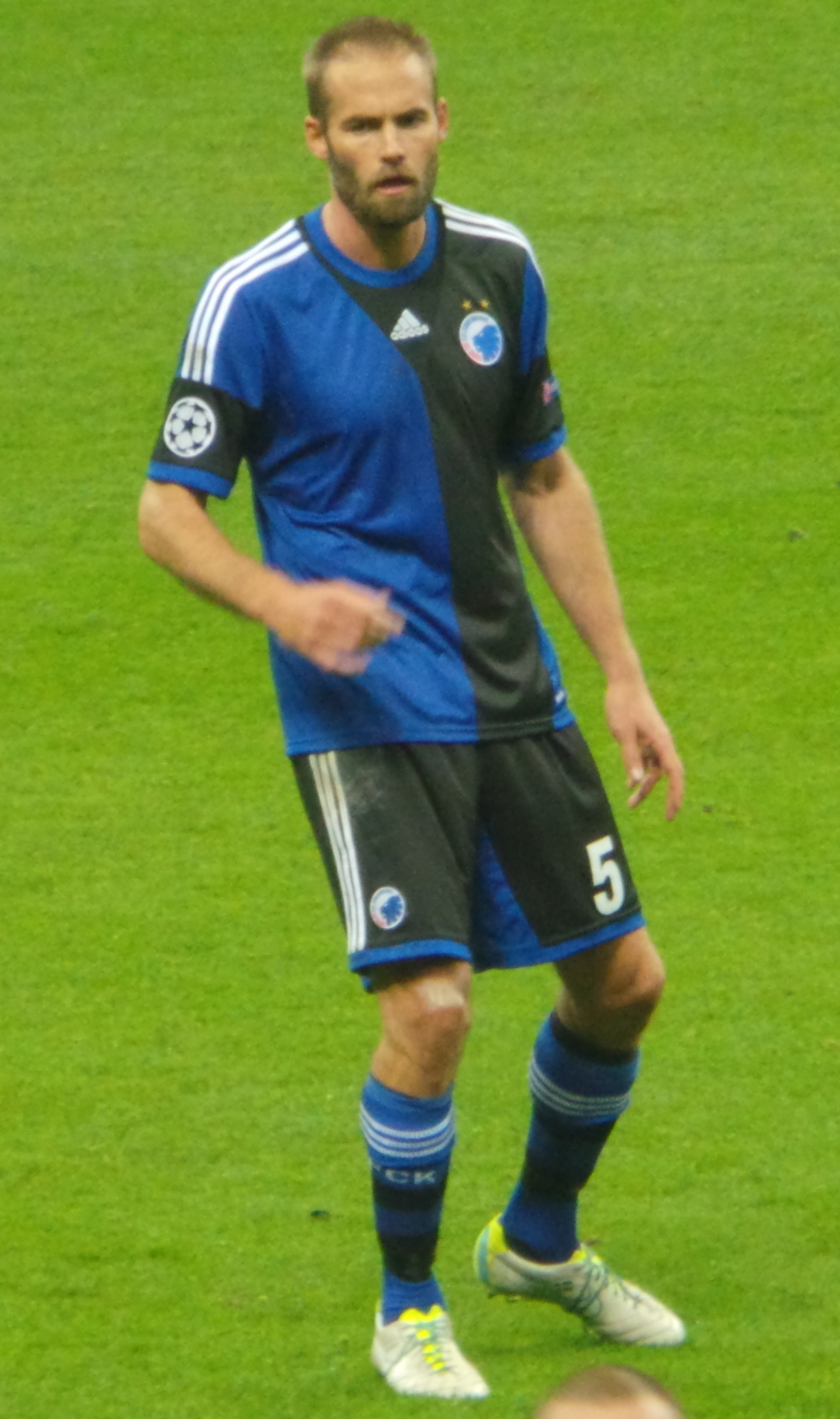
- Mellberg with F.C. Copenhagen in 2013

Personal information
- Full name: Erik Olof Mellberg
- Date of birth: 3 September 1977 (age 49)
- Place of birth: Gullspång, Sweden
- Height: 1.89 m (6 ft 2 in)
- Position: Defender

Youth career
- 1994–1996: Gullspångs IF

Senior career*
Years	Team	Apps	(Gls)
1996–1997	Degerfors IF	47	(0)
1997–1998	AIK	17	(0)
1998–2001	Racing Santander	98	(0)
2001–2008	Aston Villa	232	(8)
2008–2009	Juventus	27	(2)
2009–2012	Olympiacos	71	(7)
2012–2013	Villarreal	29	(2)
2013–2014	Copenhagen	22	(3)
Total		543	(22)

International career
1996–1999	Sweden U21	27	(4)
2000–2012	Sweden	117	(8)

Managerial career
- 2015–2017: IF Brommapojkarna
- 2019: Fremad Amager
- 2019–2020: Helsingborgs IF
- 2023–2024: IF Brommapojkarna
- 2025: St. Louis City SC
- * Club domestic league appearances and goals

Erik Olof Mellberg (pronounced [ˈûːlɔf ˈmɛ̂lːbærj]; born 3 September 1977) is a Swedish football manager and former professional player.

During his career, Mellberg played as a defender, with his longest spell being at Premier League club Aston Villa. He also played in Sweden, Spain, Italy, Greece and Denmark, for clubs including Juventus and Olympiacos.

Mellberg played for Sweden at the World Cup in 2002 and 2006, as well as the European Championship in 2000, 2004, 2008 and 2012. A former captain of the national team, he scored eight goals in 117 caps between 2000 and 2012.

Mellberg began managing Brommapojkarna in 2015 and won the third and second divisions in consecutive seasons before managing them in Allsvenskan in a later spell. He also led Helsingborg in his country's top flight, and was manager of St. Louis City SC of Major League Soccer in 2025.

== Early years ==
Erik Olof Mellberg was born in Gullspång, Sweden, on 3 September 1977 to parents Erik and Berit. Mellberg's mother Berit was a physical education teacher who passed on her love of sport to her son. As a youth, Mellberg enjoyed playing tennis and dreamed of Wimbledon rather than the World Cup. Mellberg was something of a tennis prodigy and it was not until he was 14 that he began to focus on football.

== Club career ==
=== Early career ===
Mellberg played for local side Gullspång before being picked up by Degerfors of the Allsvenskan. After being relegated, he joined capital club AIK, who won the league title in 1998. He then signed for Spanish club Racing de Santander, where he played regularly over three seasons, ending with relegation from La Liga in 2000–01.

=== Aston Villa ===
In July 2001, Mellberg signed a five-year contract with Aston Villa of England's Premier League, for an estimated fee of £5 million. He made his debut on 18 August as the season began with a goalless draw away to Tottenham Hotspur, in which he blocked a shot by Les Ferdinand and headed a chance against the crossbar. On 27 September, he left on a stretcher with an ankle injury shortly before half time in a UEFA Cup first round elimination by NK Varteks of Croatia.

On 16 September 2002, in the Second City derby away to Birmingham City, Mellberg took a throw-in to his goalkeeper Peter Enckelman, and the ball rolled into the goal. Referee David Elleray ruled that Enckelman made light contact with the ball as it rolled in, thereby making it a valid goal as a goal cannot be scored directly from a throw-in; Birmingham City won 3–0. Mellberg criticised the decision in an interview with Sweden's Expressen. Mellberg scored his first goal for Villa on 26 October, a header to open a 1–1 draw away to eventual champions Manchester United.

In August 2003, Mellberg said that the atmosphere at the club was positive after David O'Leary came in as manager to replace Graham Taylor, who had dropped Juan Pablo Ángel and Alpay Özalan; he warned that some players would be disappointed to not be included in the season opener against Portsmouth. Mellberg himself was left out of that game, a 2–1 loss to the newly promoted side, and said that he was unhappy over what he saw as a lack of an explanation why. He was then made captain by the Irishman, as Villa finished 6th in the league.

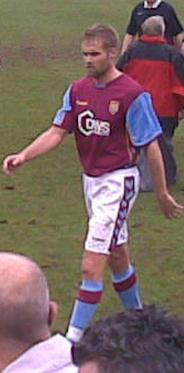
Mellberg playing for Aston Villa in 2007

On 12 December 2004, Villa lost the derby 2–1 at home to Birmingham City, in a match that Mellberg had attempted to build up by voicing his dislike of the opponents. Winning manager Steve Bruce said that Mellberg's insults motivated his team. His season ended in April due to knee meniscus cartilage damage in a 3–0 win over Newcastle United. In 2005–06, he missed five games over March and April due to a recurring hamstring injury; Gary Cahill made a breakthrough in his absence.

In 2006, incoming manager Martin O'Neill took the captaincy from Mellberg and gave it to Gareth Barry, who had signed a new contract after coming close to leaving the club. On 19 August, in the first game of the season, Mellberg headed the opening goal of a 1–1 draw away to Arsenal – the first competitive goal at the Emirates Stadium.

In January 2008, Mellberg signed a pre-contract agreement for a three-year deal with Juventus, moving on a Bosman transfer once his contract expired at the end of the season. O'Neill praised Mellberg for having adapted to playing at right-back during the season. His final home game for Aston Villa was against Wigan Athletic on 3 May, being designated as Olof Mellberg Day in appreciation of his service to the club. On his final game for Aston Villa away at West Ham United, as a leaving gift, Mellberg gave each of the 3,200 Villa fans at Upton Park either a home or an away shirt with his name and number on the back and the message Thanks 4 Your Support.

=== Juventus ===
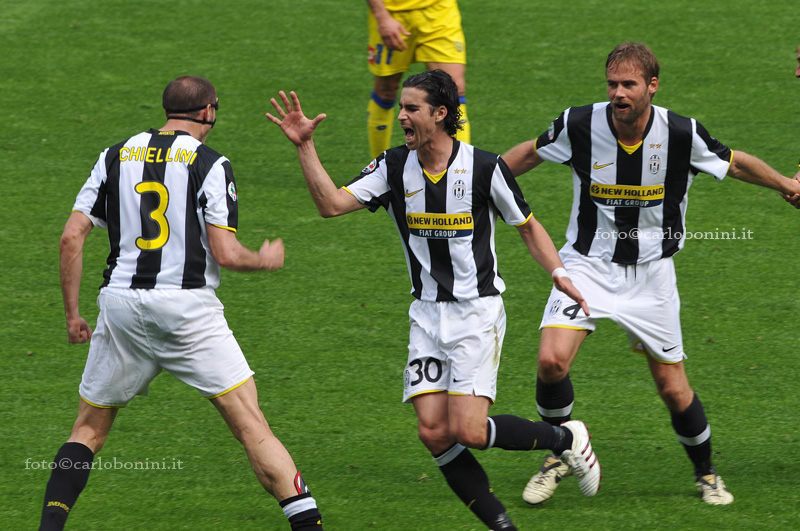
From right to left: Mellberg, Tiago Mendes and Giorgio Chiellini celebrate for Juventus in 2009

Mellberg made his debut for Juventus on 26 August 2008 in a UEFA Champions League third qualifying round second leg away to Artmedia Petržalka of Slovakia, a 1–1 draw after having been left on the bench for the 4–0 win in the first leg. On 18 January 2009, he scored his first goal in a 1–1 draw away to S.S. Lazio, adding a second on 21 March also at the Stadio Olimpico in a 4–1 win against A.S. Roma. He was a regular part of the team in his only season in Turin, as the club came runners-up in Serie A and reached the semi-finals of the Coppa Italia.

=== Olympiacos ===
On 23 June 2009, Mellberg moved to Olympiacos on a three-year contract for a fee of €2.5 million. He won Super League Greece in his second season, securing the title on 20 March 2011 with three games to spare after a 6–0 home win over rivals AEK Athens.

The club from Piraeus retained their title in 2011–12, again with three games remaining, once Panathinaikos's points deduction for fan behaviour was upheld. Olympiacos also won the Greek Football Cup, with Mellberg scoring the only goal of the two-legged semi-final against OFI in March. He turned down a new deal at the end of the 2011–12 season, hoping to find a new challenge with his agent saying "we don't close any doors."

=== Villarreal ===
On 8 August 2012, Mellberg signed a one-year contract with Spanish club Villarreal. Mellberg appeared 29 times for Villarreal in Spanish Segunda División, scoring twice, and was an important part of the squad that finished second in Segunda División and was promoted to La Liga.

=== Copenhagen ===
On 9 July 2013, Mellberg signed a two-year contract with Danish champions Copenhagen, but left after one season. He then retired.

== International career ==
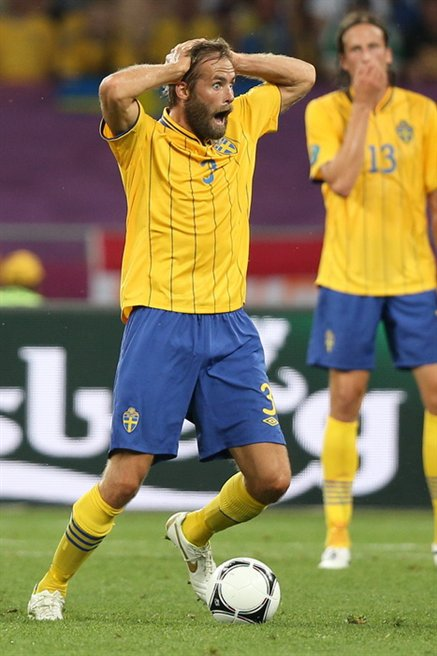
Mellberg playing for Sweden at UEFA Euro 2012

Mellberg made his debut against Austria in March 2000.

During an open team practice before the 2002 World Cup, Mellberg broke into a fight with his teammate Freddie Ljungberg after a robust tackle from Mellberg. The two of them were quickly separated by teammates. Since then, the two of them have been known for not being the best of friends, and in the 2006 World Cup, Mellberg and Ljungberg, according to leak from inside the team, had a very fiery argument, after Sweden's draw with Trinidad and Tobago. In 2003, he was selected as the best Swedish player of the year, winning the Guldbollen.

During the penalty shoot-out after the Euro 2004 quarter-final against Netherlands, Mellberg has a penalty saved by Edwin van der Sar, as the Netherlands won the shoot-out 5–4 and advanced to the semi-finals.

During a 2006 FIFA World Cup Qualifying match against Croatia in October 2005, Mellberg boxed the ball away with his hand in the Swedish penalty area. Croatia were awarded a penalty kick for this, which Dario Srna scored, and Sweden lost the match 0–1. After the 2006 FIFA World Cup in Germany, Mellberg relinquished his captaincy and Ljungberg took his place as Sweden captain.

On 4 September 2006, Mellberg, along with Zlatan Ibrahimović and Christian Wilhelmsson, was sent home from the national squad for breaking an 11 pm team curfew ahead of a European Championships qualifier against Liechtenstein. On 7 October, he returned to the lineup for their European Championships qualifier against Spain, which they won 2–0. In the 2012 European Championships, Mellberg was involved in two goals in their match against England in the group stages to give Sweden a 2–1 lead, however, Sweden went on to lose 2–3 while Mellberg became "Man of the Match". After the tournament, Mellberg decided to end his international career.

== Style of play ==
During his career, Mellberg primarily played as a central defender or right-back, although he was also capable of playing in a holding role in midfield on occasion. In a Sports Illustrated profile in the lead-up to Euro 2012, he was described as being "big, strong and exceptional in the air", while a BBC profile ahead of the 2002 World Cup noted that "[h]e pressures attackers superbly and rarely comes off second best in a challenge." Regarded as a promising defender in his youth, he later made a name for himself as a solid, dependable and hard-tackling centre-back. Although he was not very fast, he was strong, and had an excellent positional sense, and was also a good header of the ball, which made him a goal-threat on set-pieces.

== Managerial career ==
Mellberg was appointed manager of Swedish club Brommapojkarna in November 2015, signing a two-year contract and taking over following their recent relegation to the third tier of Swedish football.

Brommapojkarna won the Division 1 title during Mellberg's first season in charge and won their second successive promotion the following year, in October 2017, to return to the top flight, Allsvenskan. After the season, Mellberg chose not to renew his expiring contract with Brommapojkarna.

On 1 July 2019 Fremad Amager of the Danish 1st Division announced that Mellberg had joined the club as their new manager. After only two months in charge, he left to become the manager of Helsingborgs IF in the Allsvenskan. After the club were relegated in December 2020, he resigned with one year remaining of his contract.

Mellberg returned to Brommapojkarna in December 2019, as promotion-winning manager Christer Mattiasson had left for IK Sirius. In his first season back, the club finished in the relegation play-off place, but defeated Utsiktens BK 7–0 with all goals scored in the away first leg.

On 26 November 2024, Mellberg was announced as the new head coach of Major League Soccer club St. Louis City. On his debut in the season opener on 23 February, the team drew 0–0 at home to Colorado Rapids. He was fired on 28 May 2025, having won twice and lost eight times in 15 games. His team were second-from-bottom in the Western Conference, and had the league's second-worst attack with 11 goals.

== Personal life ==
According to Mellberg's mother, he wished to become a lawyer, but a career in professional football then became viable. In the same 2006 interview, she said that he intended to go to university after retiring, like his scientist brother.

Mellberg's son John (born 2006) also became a professional defender.

== Career statistics ==
=== Club ===
Appearances and goals by club, season and competition
Club	Season	League			National cup (Note: Includes Svenska Cupen, Copa del Rey, FA Cup, Coppa Italia, Greek Football Cup, Danish Cup)		League cup (Note: Includes Football League Cup)		Continental		Total	
Club	Season	Division	Apps	Goals	Apps	Goals	Apps	Goals	Apps	Goals	Apps	Goals
Degerfors	1996	Allsvenskan	22	0			—		—		22	0
Degerfors	1997	Allsvenskan	25	0			—		—		25	0
Degerfors	Total		47	0			—		—		47	0
AIK	1998	Allsvenskan	17	0	1	0	—		—		18	0
Racing Santander	1998–99	La Liga	25	0	7	1	—		—		32	1
Racing Santander	1999–2000	La Liga	37	0	3	0	—		—		40	0
Racing Santander	2000–01	La Liga	36	0	5	0	—		—		41	0
Racing Santander	Total		98	0	15	1	—		—		113	1
Aston Villa	2001–02	Premier League	32	0	1	0	1	0	2	0	36	0
Aston Villa	2002–03	Premier League	38	1	1	0	2	0	2	0	43	1
Aston Villa	2003–04	Premier League	33	1	1	0	5	0	—		39	1
Aston Villa	2004–05	Premier League	30	3	1	0	2	0	—		33	3
Aston Villa	2005–06	Premier League	27	0	4	0	2	0	—		33	0
Aston Villa	2006–07	Premier League	38	1	0	0	1	0	—		39	1
Aston Villa	2007–08	Premier League	34	2	1	0	2	0	—		37	2
Aston Villa	Total		232	8	9	0	15	0	4	0	260	8
Juventus	2008–09	Serie A	27	2	4	0	—		7 (Note: Appearances in UEFA Champions League)	0	38	2
Olympiacos	2009–10	Super League Greece	25	2	4	1	—		12	0	41	3
Olympiacos	2010–11	Super League Greece	23	3	0	0	—		3 (Note: Appearances in UEFA Europa League)	0	26	3
Olympiacos	2011–12	Super League Greece	23	2	4	1	—		9	0	36	3
Olympiacos	Total		71	7	8	2	—		24	0	103	9
Villarreal	2012–13	Segunda División	29	2	0	0	—		—		29	2
Copenhagen	2013–14	Danish Superliga	22	3	1	0	—		6	1	29	4
Career total			543	21	38	3	15	0	41	1	636	26

=== International ===
Appearances and goals by national team and year
National team	Year	Apps	Goals
Sweden	2000	10	0
Sweden	2001	9	0
Sweden	2002	11	0
Sweden	2003	10	1
Sweden	2004	13	0
Sweden	2005	8	1
Sweden	2006	9	0
Sweden	2007	9	2
Sweden	2008	9	0
Sweden	2009	11	3
Sweden	2010	5	0
Sweden	2011	7	0
Sweden	2012	6	1
Total		117	8

Scores and results list Sweden's goal tally first, score column indicates score after each Mellberg goal.

List of international goals scored by Olof Mellberg
No.	Date	Venue	Opponent	Score	Result	Competition
1	10 September 2003	Silesian Stadium, Chorzów, Poland	Poland	2–0	2–0	UEFA Euro 2004 qualifier
2	3 September 2005	Råsunda Stadium, Solna, Sweden	Bulgaria	2–0	3–0	2006 FIFA World Cup qualifier
3	6 June 2007	Råsunda Stadium, Solna, Sweden	Iceland	3–0	5–0	UEFA Euro 2008 qualifier
4	17 October 2007	Råsunda Stadium, Solna, Sweden	Northern Ireland	1–0	1–1	UEFA Euro 2008 qualifier
5	5 September 2009	Ferenc Puskás Stadium, Budapest, Hungary	Hungary	1–0	2–1	2010 FIFA World Cup qualifier
6	14 October 2009	Råsunda Stadium, Solna, Sweden	Albania	1–0	4–1	2010 FIFA World Cup qualifier
7	14 October 2009	Råsunda Stadium, Solna, Sweden	Albania	3–0	4–1	2010 FIFA World Cup qualifier
8	15 June 2012	Olimpiyskiy National Sports Complex, Kyiv, Ukraine	England	2–1	2–3	UEFA Euro 2012

== Managerial statistics ==
As of match played 24 May 2025

Managerial record by team and tenure
Team	Nat	From	To	Record								Ref
Team	Nat	From	To	G	W	D	L	GF	GA	GD	Win %	Ref
Brommapojkarna	(Sweden)	27 November 2015	21 November 2017	67	44	14	9	140	58	+82	65.67	
Fremad Amager	(Denmark)	1 July 2019	3 September 2019	8	3	3	2	8	8	+0	37.50	
Helsingborg	(Sweden)	3 September 2019	31 December 2020	38	8	11	19	41	61	−20	21.05	
Brommapojkarna	(Sweden)	1 January 2023	26 November 2024	34	10	4	20	50	60	−10	29.41	
St. Louis City	(United States)	26 November 2024	27 May 2025	17	3	5	9	15	23	−8	17.65	
Total				164	68	37	59	254	210	+44	41.46	—

== Honours ==
=== Player ===
AIK

- Allsvenskan: 1998

Aston Villa

- UEFA Intertoto Cup: 2001

Olympiacos

- Super League Greece: 2010–11, 2011–12
- Greek Cup: 2011–12

Copenhagen

- Danish Cup runner-up: 2013–14

Individual

- Guldbollen: 2003
- UEFA Euro All-Star Team: 2004
- Swedish Defender of the Year: 2003, 2008, 2009, 2010, 2011, 2012

=== Manager ===
Brommapojkarna

- Superettan: 2017
- Division 1 Norra: 2016

== See also ==
- List of footballers with 100 or more caps
