= Pierre Bengtsson =

Swedish footballer (born 1988)

Pierre Neurath Bengtsson
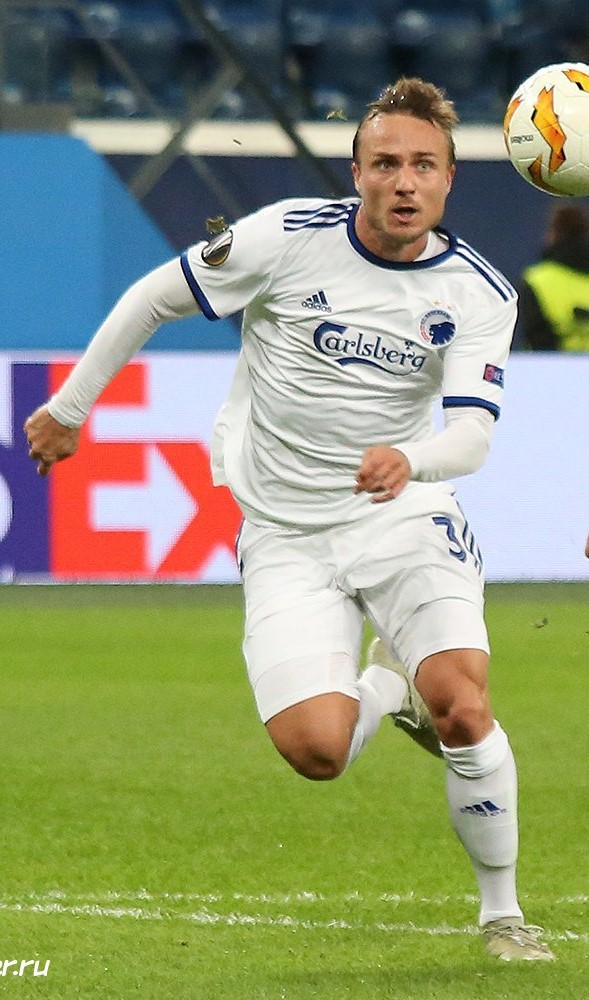
- Neurath Bengtsson with Copenhagen in 2018

Personal information
- Full name: Pierre Thomas Robin Neurath Bengtsson
- Date of birth: 12 April 1988 (age 38)
- Place of birth: Kumla, Sweden
- Height: 1.76 m (5 ft 9 in)
- Position: Left back

Youth career
- 1993–2004: IFK Kumla
- 2004–2006: AIK

Senior career*
Years	Team	Apps	(Gls)
2006–2009	AIK	43	(0)
2009–2011	Nordsjælland	39	(1)
2011–2014	Copenhagen	109	(2)
2015–2017	Mainz 05	29	(0)
2016–2017	→ Bastia (loan)	30	(1)
2017–2022	Copenhagen	80	(2)
2021	→ Vejle BK (loan)	14	(0)
2022–2023	Djurgårdens IF	21	(0)
Total		365	(6)

International career
2003–2004	Sweden U17	7	(1)
2006	Sweden U19	2	(0)
2007–2010	Sweden U21	20	(1)
2011–2022	Sweden	42	(0)
- * Club domestic league appearances and goals

Pierre Thomas Robin Neurath Bengtsson (born 12 April 1988) is a Swedish former professional footballer who played as a left-back.

Starting his career with AIK in the mid-2000s, he spent most of his career in the Danish Superliga, and also had stints in the Bundesliga and Ligue 1 before returning to Sweden in 2022 with Djurgårdens IF before his retirement the following year.

A full international between 2011 and 2022, he won 42 caps for Sweden and represented his country at UEFA Euro 2020.

== Club career ==
=== AIK ===
Neurath Bengtsson started his senior career at AIK, where he made his debut in August 2006, against Östers IF at Råsunda Stadium.

=== FC Nordsjælland ===
After 3 1/2 seasons at AIK, Neurath Bengtsson searched for more playtime and joined on 1 September 2009 the Danish Superliga FC Nordsjælland. Bengtsson began his Nordsjælland spell as back-up for Dennis Cagara, receiving his debut in the Danish Cup against AB on 23 September 2009. His first Superliga match was a 6–3 defeat against Brøndby IF on 4 October 2009.

From 1 November 2009, Neurath Bengtsson became a regular starter for FC Nordsjælland on the left back position. Through his performances, Bengtsson became in the interest of UEFA Champions League competitors Copenhagen in the summer 2010, and in the following winter transfer window, Bengtsson moved to Copenhagen.

=== FC Copenhagen ===
In Copenhagen, Neurath Bengtsson was a back-up for Oscar Wendt in his first half year. Nevertheless, Neurath Bengtsson appeared in 8 of 16 matches before Wendt moved on to join Borussia Mönchengladbach. Bengtsson's debut came as a substitute on 22 February 2011 in the UEFA Champions League round-of-16-match against Chelsea

In the 2011–12 season, Neurath Bengtsson began as first choice at left back. Through autumn, however, he was overtaken by Bryan Oviedo, and from 27 October to 15 April Neurath Bengtsson was only in the lineup twice. Oviedo was sold to Everton on 31 August 2012, and since Bengtsson has been the preferred left back in the club.

=== Mainz 05 ===
On 23 November 2014, Mainz 05 announced that they had signed Neurath Bengtsson effective 1 January 2015. Since his contract with FC Copenhagen had expired 31 December 2014, he was available on a free transfer and signed a contract for 3 1/2 years until summer 2018.

== International career ==
Neurath Bengtsson was a part of the Swedish youth national teams, gaining 29 matches in total. He was a part of the Swedish squad at the 2009 UEFA Under-21 Championship.

On 19 January 2011, Bengtsson made his debut for the senior national team in a friendly against Botswana.

Despite playing regularly as left back for Sweden during the UEFA Euro 2020 qualifying, he was surprisingly not selected for the final squad. However, he was eventually called up to replace the injured Martin Olsson.

== Career statistics ==
=== Club ===
Appearances and goals by club, season and competition
Club	Season	League			National Cup (Note: Includes Svenska Cupen, Danish Cup, Coupe de France)		League Cup (Note: Includes Coupe de la Ligue)		Europe		Other		Total	
Club	Season	Division	Apps	Goals	Apps	Goals	Apps	Goals	Apps	Goals	Apps	Goals	Apps	Goals
AIK	2007	Allsvenskan	5	0	0	0	—		4 (Note: Appearance(s) in UEFA Cup)	0	—		9	0
AIK	2008	Allsvenskan	18	0	0	0	—		—		—		18	0
AIK	2009	Allsvenskan	14	0	3	0	—		—		—		17	0
AIK	Total		37	0	3	0	—		4	0	—		44	0
Nordsjælland	2009–10	Danish Superliga	20	1	5	1	—		—		—		25	2
Nordsjælland	2010–11	Danish Superliga	19	0	2	0	—		2 (Note: Appearance(s) in UEFA Europa League)	0	—		23	0
Nordsjælland	Total		39	1	7	1	—		2	0	—		48	2
Copenhagen	2010–11	Danish Superliga	6	0	0	0	—		2 (Note: Appearance(s) in UEFA Champions League)	0	—		8	0
Copenhagen	2011–12	Danish Superliga	27	0	3	0	—		8 (Note: Four appearances in UEFA Champions League, four appearances in UEFA Europa League)	0	—		38	0
Copenhagen	2012–13	Danish Superliga	29	1	2	0	—		9 (Note: Three appearances in UEFA Champions League, six appearances in UEFA Europa League)	0	—		40	1
Copenhagen	2013–14	Danish Superliga	31	1	6	2	—		6	0	—		43	3
Copenhagen	2014–15	Danish Superliga	16	0	1	0	—		9 (Note: Four appearances in UEFA Champions League, five appearances in UEFA Europa League)	0	—		26	0
Copenhagen	Total		109	2	12	2	—		34	0	—		155	4
Mainz	2014–15	Bundesliga	13	0	0	0	—		0	0	—		13	0
Mainz	2015–16	Bundesliga	16	0	1	0	—		—		—		17	0
Mainz	Total		29	0	1	0	—		0	0	—		30	0
Bastia (loan)	2016–17	Ligue 1	30	1	1	0	1	0	—		—		32	1
Copenhagen	2017–18	Danish Superliga	24	1	2	0	—		11 (Note: Six appearances in UEFA Champions League, five appearances in UEFA Europa League)	0	—		37	1
Copenhagen	2018–19	Danish Superliga	15	0	2	0	—		8	0	—		25	0
Copenhagen	2019–20	Danish Superliga	31	1	0	0	—		16 (Note: Four appearances in UEFA Champions League, twelve appearances in UEFA Europa League)	0	—		47	1
Copenhagen	2020–21	Danish Superliga	8	0	1	0	—		3	0	—		12	0
Copenhagen	2021–22	Danish Superliga	3	0	1	0	—		4 (Note: Appearance(s) in UEFA Conference League)	0	—		8	0
Copenhagen	Total		81	2	6	0	—		42	0	—		129	2
Vejle (loan)	2020–21	Danish Superliga	14	0	2	0	—		—		—		16	0
Career total			339	6	32	3	1	0	82	0	—		454	9

=== International ===
Appearances and goals by national team and year
National team	Year	Apps	Goals
Sweden	2011	3	0
Sweden	2012	1	0
Sweden	2013	5	0
Sweden	2014	9	0
Sweden	2015	6	0
Sweden	2016	0	0
Sweden	2017	0	0
Sweden	2018	0	0
Sweden	2019	5	0
Sweden	2020	5	0
Sweden	2021	7	0
Sweden	2022	1	0
Total		42	0

== Honours ==
AIK

- Allsvenskan: 2009

Nordsjælland

- Danish Cup: 2009–10

Copenhagen

- Danish Superliga: 2010–11, 2012–13, 2018–19
- Danish Cup: 2011–12
