= Kasper Povlsen =

Danish footballer (born 1989)

Personal information
- Full name: Kasper Povlsen
- Date of birth: 26 September 1989 (age 37)
- Place of birth: Denmark
- Height: 1.82 m (6 ft 0 in)

Team information
- Current team: Odder IGF (head of talents)

Youth career
- 199?–2003: Dronningborg BK
- 2003–2008: AGF

Senior career*
Years	Team	Apps	(Gls)
2008–2015	AGF	176	(4)
2015–2017	Hobro IK	53	(4)
2017–2018	Vendsyssel FF	9	(0)

International career
2005	Denmark U16	3	(0)
2005–2006	Denmark U17	12	(0)
2006–2007	Denmark U18	4	(0)
2007–2008	Denmark U19	6	(1)
2009–2010	Denmark U21	9	(0)

Managerial career
- 2020–2021: Dronningborg BK (assistant)
- 2021–2022: AGF (youth)
- 2022–: Odder IGF (head of talents)
- * Club domestic league appearances and goals

Kasper Povlsen (born 26 September 1989) is a Danish retired footballer. He is notably right-footed.

== Retirement ==
In December 2018, Povlsen announced that he would retire at the end of the year due to some serious injuries.

Two years after his retirement, in December 2020, it was confirmed that Povlsen had returned to his childhood club Dronningborg Boldklub, as assistant manager. On 22 March 2021, he was also hired as a youth coach at AGF. In July 2022 Povlsen confirmed that he had been hired as head of the clubs talent center.
