= Emil Berger =

Swedish footballer

Personal information
- Date of birth: 23 May 1991 (age 35)
- Place of birth: Degerfors, Sweden
- Height: 1.71 m (5 ft 7 1/2 in)
- Position: Midfielder

Team information
- Current team: IF Karlstad
- Number: 7

Youth career
- 1996–2007: Degerfors

Senior career*
| Years | Team | Apps | (Gls) |
| 2007–2008 | Degerfors | 3 | (0) |
| 2008 | AIK | 0 | (0) |
| 2008 | → Väsby United (loan) | 0 | (0) |
| 2009–2010 | Degerfors | 35 | (0) |
| 2010 | → Carlstad United (loan) | 12 | (0) |
| 2011–2014 | Örebro | 29 | (1) |
| 2013 | → Fylkir (loan) | 9 | (1) |
| 2014 | Kongsvinger | 13 | (1) |
| 2014–2017 | Forward | 61 | (5) |
| 2018 | Rynninge | 28 | (11) |
| 2019–2020 | Dalkurd | 21 | (0) |
| 2021–2023 | Leiknir Reykjavík | 47 | (6) |
| 2023 | HB Tórshavn | 26 | (1) |
| 2024– | IF Karlstad | 34 | (2) |

International career
| 2012 | Sweden U21 | 1 | (0) |
- * Club domestic league appearances and goals as of 26 November 2025

Emil Berger (born 23 May 1991) is a Swedish footballer who plays for IF Karlstad as a midfielder.

== Club career ==
On 18 February 2021, Berger signed with Leiknir Reykjavík in Iceland.
