= Samuel Aziz =

Swedish footballer of Ethiopian descent

Personal information
- Full name: Samuel Aziz
- Date of birth: 5 July 1991 (age 35)
- Place of birth: Helsingborg, Sweden
- Height: 1.83 m (6 ft 0 in)
- Position: Forward

Youth career
- Högaborgs BK

Senior career*
Years	Team	Apps	(Gls)
2009–2011	Helsingborgs IF	2	(0)
2011	→ Ängelholms FF (loan)	0	(0)
2011–2012	Varbergs BoIS	8	(1)
2012	Högaborgs BK	10	(8)
2013	IF Limhamn Bunkeflo	22	(2)
2014	Höganäs BK	25	(25)
2015	Landskrona BoIS	8	(0)
2015	→ Syrianska FC (loan)	7	(1)
2016	Huddinge IF	25	(21)
2017–2018	GIF Sundsvall	1	(0)
2018	→ IK Brage (loan)	19	(1)
2019	Eskilsminne IF	2	(0)

International career
2006–2008	Sweden U17	18	(6)
2009	Sweden U19	5	(1)
- * Club domestic league appearances and goals as of 23:10, 14 May 2019 (UTC)

Samuel Aziz (born 5 July 1991) is a Swedish footballer of Ethiopian descent who plays as a forward, most recently for Eskilsminne IF.

== Club career ==
Samuel began his senior playing career, playing for Helsingborgs IF in the Swedish league Allsvenskan, the top tier of Swedish football. In 2014, he did 25 goals in 25 games, and became the top scorer in league 2 for Hoganas BK. In 2015, he signed for Landskrona BoIS. He made his competition debut playing 90 minutes against the Swedish top team AIK in February.

Before signing for Helsingborgs IF, Samuel had trials for Premier League side Arsenal, Eredivisie side Feyenoord, and Serie A side Juventus. In 2012, he had trials at clubs in England and undertook a 3-week trial at Premier League club Stoke City in July. A month later he spent three weeks at Championship club Crystal Palace and was in talks over a short-term contract.
