= Alusine Kamara =

Sierra Leonean footballer (born 1989)

Personal information
- Date of birth: 5 September 1989 (age 37)
- Place of birth: Freetown, Sierra Leone
- Height: 1.76 m (5 ft 9 in)
- Position: Midfielder

Youth career
- FC Kallon

Senior career*
| Years | Team | Apps | (Gls) |
| 2008–2011 | FC Kallon | | |
| 2011 | → Motala AIF (loan) | 13 | (3) |
| 2011–2013 | Syrianska FC | 2 | (0) |

International career
| 2011 | Sierra Leone | 1 | (0) |
- * Club domestic league appearances and goals

Alusine Kamara (born 5 September 1989) is a Sierra Leonean retired footballer who played two matches as a midfielder for Syrianska FC in the Swedish Allsvenskan, as well as once for the Sierra Leonea national team.

== Career ==
Kamara played for Freetown club FC Kallon, whom he represented in the Sierra Leone National Premier League and the African Champions League. In 2011, he agreed a loan move to Swedish Division 1 Södra (third tier) side Motala AIF, where he scored six goals in 13 appearances.

Following a summer 2011 trial with recently promoted Allsvenskan side Syrianska FC, Kamara agreed a transfer to – and a three-and-a-half-year contract with – the top-tier club on 10 August 2011. He made his first Allsvenskan start a few days later in a 3–0 defeat to Mjällby AIF.

Kamara was also capped once football for Sierra Leone. His debut came in a February 2011 friendly match 2–1 defeat against Nigeria in Lagos. He was also called up by Sierra Leone's Swedish manager Lars Olof Mattsson to participate in a May 2011 training camp.
