= Christopher Alvengrip =

Swedish footballer

Personal information
- Full name: Christopher Alvengrip
- Date of birth: 12 March 1990 (age 36)
- Place of birth: Sweden
- Height: 1.82 m (5 ft 11 1/2 in)
- Position: Midfielder

Youth career
- Högadals IS

Senior career*
Years	Team	Apps	(Gls)
2008–2009	Helsingborgs IF	0	(0)
2009	→ Mjällby AIF (loan)	3	(0)
2010–2011	Mjällby AIF	1	(0)
2010	→ Kristianstads FF (loan)	4	(1)
2011	→ Västerås SK (loan)	9	(1)
2011	→ Eskilsminne IF (loan)	2	(0)

International career
2007	Sweden U19	3	(1)
- * Club domestic league appearances and goals

Christopher Alvengrip, né Nilsson (born 12 March 1990) is a Swedish footballer who plays as a midfielder. He played in the Allsvenskan for Mjällby AIF.
