= Zlatan Krizanović =

Swedish footballer (born 1991)

Personal information
- Date of birth: 17 May 1991 (age 35)
- Place of birth: Myresjö, Sweden
- Height: 1.91 m (6 ft 3 in)
- Position: Forward

Youth career
- –2008: Myresjö IF
- 2009–2010: AZ

Senior career*
Years	Team	Apps	(Gls)
2008	Myresjö IF	25	(10)
2010–2011	AZ	0	(0)
2010–2011	→ Telstar (loan)	7	(2)
2011	IF Elfsborg	0	(0)
2011	→ Falkenbergs FF (loan)	7	(1)
2012–2018	Falkenbergs FF	73	(8)
2019–2021	Torslanda IK	17	(2)
- * Club domestic league appearances and goals

Zlatan Krizanović (born 17 May 1991) is a Swedish former professional footballer who played as a striker. He is also a coach, having spent time working with Torslanda and the Olé Football Academy in New Zealand.

== Life and career ==
=== Club career ===
Krizanović came through the youth system at Swedish Division 2 club Myresjö IF. By 2008 he had become a goalscorer in the first team. In December 2008, he agreed to sign for Dutch Eredivisie side AZ Alkmaar. He spent the 2009–10 season playing for the AZ under-19 side.

In 2010–11 he moved on loan to Telstar, making his debut in February 2011 in a 1–1 league draw with Almere City. He scored two goals in seven games for the season, the first coming against Dordrecht in a 2–2 draw on 18 March 2011.

In summer 2011, his contract with AZ Alkmaar expired. He left the club and returned to Sweden where he went on trial with Allsvenskan clubs Trelleborgs FF, Helsingborgs IF and Örebro SK. On 31 August 2011 he signed for Swedish Allsvenskan side Elfsborg, but on the same day he was loaned out to Falkenberg in Superettan. His first league match for Falkenbergs was a 4–0 victory against Assyriska FF on 11 September 2011.

On 3 January 2012 Falkenbergs FF confirmed that they had signed a 2-year contract with Krizanović. He left the club after the 2018 season.

=== International career ===
Krizanović has Swedish citizenship and would also be eligible to represent Bosnia and Herzegovina and Croatia, the respective countries of his mother and father, at international level. In June 2011, he was called up to attend a training session with the Swedish U21 team.

== Career statistics ==
As of 14 September 2011

Club statistics
Club	Season	League		National Cup		League Cup		Other		Total	
Club	Season	App	Goals	App	Goals	App	Goals	App	Goals	App	Goals
Telstar	2010–11	7	2	0	0	0	0	0	0	7	2
Elfsborg	2011	0	0	0	0	0	0	0	0	0	0
Falkenberg	2011	7	1	0	0	0	0	0	0	7	1
Falkenberg	2012	0	0	0	0	0	0	0	0	0	0
Total		14	3	0	0	0	0	0	0	14	3
