= Tobias Andersson (footballer) =

Swedish footballer

Personal information
- Full name: Tobias Carl Mikael Andersson
- Date of birth: 18 February 1994 (age 32)
- Height: 1.88 m (6 ft 2 in)
- Positions: Goalkeeper; forward

Team information
- Current team: Gnosjö IF

Youth career
- Forsheda IF

Senior career*
Years	Team	Apps	(Gls)
2010–2018	IFK Värnamo	48	(0)
2011	→ Gnosjö IF (loan)		
2015	→ Ljungby IF (loan)		
2016	→ Gnosjö IF (loan)	19	(0)
2019	Öster	20	(0)
2020–2021	Kalmar FF	6	(0)
2022–	Gnosjö IF	0	(0)
- * Club domestic league appearances and goals as of 4 February 2022

Tobias Carl Mikael Andersson (born 18 February 1994) is a Swedish footballer who plays as a forward for Gnosjö IF. He has previously represented IFK Värnamo, Östers IF, and Kalmar FF as a goalkeeper on Superettan and Allsvenskan level.
