= Obie Etie Ikechukwu =

Nigerian footballer

Obie Etie
Personal information
- Full name: Obie Etie Ikechukwu
- Date of birth: 19 January 1987 (age 39)
- Place of birth: Osogbo, Nigeria
- Height: 1.77 m (5 ft 9 1/2 in)
- Position: Forward

Team information
- Current team: Assyriska United IK

Youth career
- Nigerdock FC

Senior career*
Years	Team	Apps	(Gls)
2008–2009	Väsby United	27	(3)
2010–2012	Syrianska FC	21	(5)
2011	→ Östers IF (loan)	15	(4)
2012–2013	→ Syrianska IF Kerburan (loan)	15	(6)
2015–	Assyriska United IK		
- * Club domestic league appearances and goals as of 14 December 2012

Obie Etie Ikechukwu (born 19 January 1987) is a Nigerian footballer who plays as a midfielder. Etie played in 2015 season for Assyriska United IK in Swedish division 4.
