= Riki Cakić =

Bosnian-born Swedish footballer

Personal information
- Full name: Orhan Cakić
- Date of birth: 17 June 1990 (age 36)
- Place of birth: Banja Luka, SR Bosnia and Herzegovina, SFR Yugoslavia
- Height: 1.71 m (5 ft 7 1/2 in)
- Position: Midfielder

Team information
- Current team: Assyriska IF

Youth career
- 1997–2004: IF Sylvia
- 2005–2006: IFK Norrköping

Senior career*
Years	Team	Apps	(Gls)
2007–2013	IFK Norrköping	44	(3)
2011	→ Assyriska FF (loan)	10	(1)
2012	→ Ljungskile (loan)	12	(1)
2012	→ IK Sleipner (loan)	1	(0)
2013	→ IF Sylvia (loan)	23	(5)
2014	IK Sleipner	22	(12)
2015	Linköping City		
2016–2017	IK Sleipner	12	(0)
2017–	Assyriska IF	0	(0)

International career
2006–2007	Sweden U17	11	(1)
2007–2009	Sweden U19	6	(0)
- * Club domestic league appearances and goals as of 20 March 2017 (UTC)

Orhan "Riki" Cakić (born 17 June 1990 in Banja Luka) is a Bosnian-born Swedish footballer who plays for Assyriska IF as a midfielder.
