= List of past AIK Fotboll players =

The following players have represented AIK and either made at least 150 league appearances for the club, made at least 30 appearances for their national team, or received an individual award during their time with AIK Fotboll. See also List of AIK Fotboll players.

- (Sweden) Erik Almgren
- (Sweden) Andreas Andersson
- (Sweden) Sven Andersson
- (Sweden) Björn Anlert
- (Sweden) Lennart Backman
- (Sweden) Nabil Bahoui
- (Sierra Leone) Mohamed Bangura
- (Sweden) Pierre Bengtsson
- (Sweden) Thomas Bergman
- (Sweden) Orvar Bergmark
- (Sweden) Kim Bergstrand
- (Ghana) Derek Boateng
- (Costa Rica) Celso Borges
- (Sweden) Björn Carlsson
- (Sweden) Henry Carlsson
- (Sweden) Lennart Carlsson
- (Sweden) Sven Dahlkvist
- (Iceland) Helgi Daníelsson
- (Sweden) Erik Edman
- (Uruguay) Sebastián Eguren
- (Sweden) Jan Eriksson
- (Nigeria) Dickson Etuhu
- (Brazil) Wilton Figueiredo
- (Eritrea) Henok Goitom
- (Sweden) Göran Göransson
- (Sweden) Roland Grip
- (Sweden) Kurt Hamrin
- (Sweden) Magnus Hedman
- (Netherlands) Jos Hooiveld
- (Sweden) Stefan Ishizaki
- (Sweden) Nils-Eric Johansson
- (Liberia) Dulee Johnson
- (Sweden) Göran Karlsson
- (Sweden) Per Karlsson
- (Sweden) Per Kaufeldt
- (Uganda) Martin Kayongo-Mutumba
- (Sweden) Björn Kindlund
- (Sweden) Rudolf Kock
- (Sweden) Pontus Kåmark
- (Sweden) Thomas Lagerlöf
- (Sweden) Peter Larsson
- (Sweden) Börje Leander
- (Sweden) Börje Leback
- (Sweden) Yngve Leback
- (Sweden) Anders Limpar
- (Sweden) Bernt Ljung
- (Sweden) Teddy Lučić
- (Sweden) Björn Lundberg
- (Sweden) Arne Lundqvist
- (Sweden) Daniel Majstorović
- (Sweden) Olof Mellberg
- (Sweden) Johan Mjällby
- (Finland) Jyrki Nieminen
- (Sweden) Axel Nilsson
- (Sweden) Harry Nilsson
- (Sweden) John Nilsson
- (Sweden) Krister Nordin
- (Argentina) Iván Obolo
- (Ghana) Ebenezer Ofori
- (Sweden) Owe Ohlsson
- (Argentina) Jorge Ortiz
- (England) Kenny Pavey
- (Finland) Esa Pekonen
- (Sweden) Eric Persson
- (Sweden) Gösta Persson
- (Sweden) Robin Quaison
- (Sweden) Mats Rubarth
- (Sweden) Ove Rübsamen
- (Sweden) Pascal Simpson
- (Sweden) Gustav Sjöberg
- (Sweden) Valter Sköld
- (Jamaica) Khari Stephenson
- (Sweden) Gary Sundgren
- (Sweden) Daniel Tjernström
- (Croatia) Ivan Turina
- (Finland) Kari Virtanen
- (Sweden) Ernst Wahlberg
- (Iraq) Ahmed Yasin Ghani
- (Kenya) Eric Ouma Otieno
