= 2016 AIK Fotboll season =

AIK
2016 season
- Chairman: Jonny Jergander
- Manager: Rikard Norling
- Stadium: Skytteholms IP; Friends Arena; Tele2 Arena
- Allsvenskan: 2nd
- 2015–16 Svenska Cupen: Quarterfinal vs Hammarby
- 2016–17 Svenska Cupen: Progress to 2017 season
- UEFA Europa League: Third Qualifying Round vs Panathinaikos
- Top goalscorer: League: Alexander Isak (10); All: Alexander Isak (13)
- Highest home attendance: 30,843 vs Hammarby (28 August 2016)
- Lowest home attendance: 2,632 vs Varbergs BoIS (20 February 2016)
- Average home league attendance: 16,430 (Allsvenskan - 6 November 2016); 14,407 (All competitions - 6 November 2016)
Home colours	Away colours	Third colours

The 2016 season was AIK's 125th in existence, their 88th season in Allsvenskan and their 11th consecutive season in the league. The team competed in Allsvenskan, Svenska Cupen and UEFA Europa League.

== Season events ==
Prior to the start of the season, AIK announced the signing of Daniel Sundgren from Degerfors on a contract until the end of 2019, the return of Eero Markkanen on a contract until the end of 2018.

On 4 January, AIK announced the singing of Denni Avdić from AZ Alkmaar to a three-year contract. The following day, 5 January, Amin Affane joined AIK from Arminia Bielefeld.

On 7 January, AIK announced the signing of Ahmed Yasin from AGF on a two-year contract.

On 4 August, AIK announced the singing of free-agent Chinedu Obasi to a short-term contract. Five days later, 11 August, AIK announced the signing of John Chibuike from Gaziantepspor until the end of the season.

== Squad ==
As of match played 6 November 2016

No.	Name	Nationality	Position	Date of birth (age)	Signed from	Signed in	Contract ends	Apps.	Goals
Goalkeepers
13	Kyriakos Stamatopoulos	(Canada)	GK	28 August 1979 (aged 37)	Tromsø	2011		61	0
34	Oscar Linnér	(Sweden)	GK	23 February 1997 (aged 19)	Academy	2015		7	0
35	Patrik Carlgren	(Sweden)	GK	8 January 1992 (aged 24)	IK Brage	2013	2016	94	0
Defenders
2	Haukur Hauksson	(Iceland)	DF	1 September 1991 (aged 25)	KR	2015	2019	57	6
3	Per Karlsson	(Sweden)	DF	2 January 1986 (aged 30)	Academy	2003			
4	Nils-Eric Johansson	(Sweden)	DF	13 January 1980 (aged 36)	Leicester City	2007		333	18
15	Sauli Väisänen	(Finland)	DF	5 June 1994 (aged 22)	Honka	2014		44	4
21	Daniel Sundgren	(Sweden)	DF	22 November 1990 (aged 25)	Degerfors	2016	2019	32	0
26	Jos Hooiveld	(Netherlands)	DF	22 April 1983 (aged 33)	Unattached	2015	2017	60	2
32	Patrick Kpozo	(Ghana)	DF	15 July 1997 (aged 19)	International Allies	2015		18	0
Midfielders
8	Johan Blomberg	(Sweden)	MF	14 June 1987 (aged 29)	Halmstad	2015	2017	70	6
16	Rickson Mansiamina	(Sweden)	MF	9 July 1997 (aged 19)	Academy	2016		1	0
17	Ebenezer Ofori	(Ghana)	MF	1 July 1995 (aged 21)	New Edubiase United	2013	2017	101	5
19	Ahmed Yasin	(Iraq)	MF	22 April 1991 (aged 25)	AGF	2016	2018	27	2
20	Dickson Etuhu	(Nigeria)	MF	8 June 1982 (aged 34)	Unattached	2015	2016	33	2
24	Stefan Ishizaki	(Sweden)	MF	15 May 1982 (aged 34)	Unattached	2015	2017		
25	William Jan	(Sweden)	MF	7 October 1998 (aged 18)	Academy	2016		0	0
29	Anton Salétros	(Sweden)	MF	12 April 1996 (aged 20)	Academy	2013		75	2
31	Christos Gravius	(Sweden)	MF	14 October 1997 (aged 19)	Academy	2015		17	0
39	Amin Affane	(Sweden)	MF	21 January 1994 (aged 22)	Arminia Bielefeld	2016		27	2
Forwards
7	Chinedu Obasi	(Nigeria)	FW	1 June 1986 (aged 30)	Unattached	2016	2016	10	6
9	Marko Nikolić	(Sweden)	FW	17 September 1997 (aged 19)	Academy	2014		18	2
10	Denni Avdić	(Sweden)	FW	5 September 1988 (aged 28)	AZ Alkmaar	2016	2018	23	4
11	Eero Markkanen	(Finland)	FW	3 July 1991 (aged 25)	RoPS	2016	2018	44	16
14	John Chibuike	(Nigeria)	FW	10 October 1988 (aged 28)	Gaziantepspor	2016	2016	7	0
36	Alexander Isak	(Sweden)	FW	21 September 1999 (aged 17)	Academy	2016		29	13
Out on loan
18	Noah Sundberg	(Sweden)	DF	6 June 1996 (aged 20)	Academy	2013		39	3
28	Niclas Eliasson	(Sweden)	MF	7 December 1995 (aged 20)	Falkenberg	2014	2017	43	2
Left during the season
7	Fredrik Brustad	(Norway)	FW	22 June 1989 (aged 27)	Stabæk	2015	2017	49	10
21	William Sheriff	(Sweden)	MF	30 October 1996 (aged 20)	Academy	2015		0	0
22	Carlos Strandberg	(Sweden)	FW	14 April 1996 (aged 20)	CSKA Moscow	2016	2016	15	9

== Transfers ==
=== In ===
Date	Position	Nationality	Name	From	Fee	Ref.
1 January 2016	DF	(Sweden)	Daniel Sundgren	Degerfors	Undisclosed	
1 January 2016	FW	(Finland)	Eero Markkanen	RoPS	Undisclosed	
4 January 2016	FW	(Sweden)	Denni Avdić	AZ Alkmaar	Undisclosed	
5 January 2016	MF	(Sweden)	Amin Affane	Arminia Bielefeld	Undisclosed	
7 January 2016	MF	(Sweden)	Ahmed Yasin	AGF	Undisclosed	
4 August 2016	FW	(Nigeria)	Chinedu Obasi	Unattached	Free	
11 August 2016	FW	(Nigeria)	John Chibuike	Gaziantepspor	Undisclosed	

=== Loans in ===
Start date	Position	Nationality	Name	From	End date	Ref.
31 March 2016	FW	(Sweden)	Carlos Strandberg	CSKA Moscow	18 July 2016	

=== Out ===
Date	Position	Nationality	Name	To	Fee	Ref.
1 January 2016	FW	(Sierra Leone)	Mohamed Bangura	Dalian Yifang	Undisclosed	
16 June 2016	FW	(Norway)	Fredrik Brustad	Molde	Undisclosed	
30 August 2016	MF	(Sweden)	William Sheriff]	Karlbergs BK	Undisclosed	

=== Loans out ===
Start date	Position	Nationality	Name	To	End date	Ref.
1 January 2016	GK	(Sweden)	Rager Rebandi	Vasalund	31 December 2016	
1 January 2016	DF	(Sweden)	Noah Sundberg	GIF Sundsvall	31 December 2016	
1 January 2016	MF	(Sweden)	Rickson Mansiamina	HIFK Fotboll	10 July 2016	
1 January 2016	MF	(Sweden)	William Sheriff	Nyköpings BIS	30 June 2016	
1 January 2016	FW	(Sweden)	Marko Nikolić	Syrianska	31 December 2016	
28 July 2016	MF	(Sweden)	Niclas Eliasson	IFK Norrköping	31 December 2016	

=== Released ===
Date	Position	Nationality	Name	Joined	Date	Ref
31 December 2016	GK	(Sweden)	Patrik Carlgren	Nordsjælland	10 February 2017	
31 December 2016	MF	(Nigeria)	Dickson Etuhu	IFK Rössjöholm	6 August 2017	
31 December 2016	FW	(Nigeria)	John Chibuike	Hapoel Tel Aviv	26 January 2017	
31 December 2016	FW	(Nigeria)	Chinedu Obasi	Shenzhen	4 February 2017	
31 December 2016	FW	(Sweden)	Marko Nikolić	Westerlo	19 January 2017	

== Friendlies ==
23 January 2016	Vasalunds IF	5–4	AIK	Stockholm
14:00 CET (UTC+1)	Johansson 13', 21'; Ike 16'; Bulut 44'; Dobrijevic 51'; Whitman (yellow card) 90+2'	Report	Markkanen 43'; Salétros (yellow card) 52'; Affane 63', 74'; Sundgren 79' (pen.)	Stadium: Skytteholms IP; Attendance: 750; Referee: Björn Särnbrink

1 February 2016	Midtjylland	0–0	AIK	Dubai, United Arab Emirates
13:00 CET (UTC+1)	Pušić (yellow card) 62'	Report	Väisänen (yellow card) 35'; Salétros (yellow card) 74'	Stadium: The Sevens Stadium; Attendance: 43; Referee: Abdullah Bin Abood

5 February 2016	Molde	1–1 (a.e.t.) (2–4 p)	AIK	Dubai, United Arab Emirates
20:00 CET (UTC+1)	Elyounoussi 78'	Report	Brustad 37'	Stadium: The Sevens Stadium; Attendance: 76
	Penalties
	Elyounoussi (penalty scored); Forren (penalty missed); Diouf (penalty missed); Aursnes (penalty scored)		(penalty scored) Ishizaki; (penalty scored) Sundgren; (penalty scored) Eliasson; (penalty scored) Affane

10 February 2016	FC Copenhagen	1–0	AIK	Dubai, United Arab Emirates
16:00 CET (UTC+1)		Report	Kadrii 88'	Stadium: The Sevens Stadium; Attendance: 72

14 February 2016	AIK	4–1	IFK Norrköping	Stockholm
14:00 CET (UTC+1)	Ishizaki 14'; Avdić 27', 52'; Eliasson 45'	Report	Kujović 87'; Vaikla (yellow card)	Stadium: Skytteholms IP; Attendance: 2,523; Referee: Stefan Johannesson

21 February 2016	IFK Norrköping	4–2	AIK	Norrköping
17:00 CET (UTC+1)	Diawara 32'; Bukva 72'; Brunzell (yellow card) 84'; Enarsson 89' (pen.); Tkalčić 90+2'	Report	Isak 1', 4'; Yasin (yellow card) 55'; Edlund (yellow card) 89'	Stadium: Nya Parken; Attendance: 90; Referee: Robin Andersson

20 March 2016	AIK	1–1	Gefle	Stockholm
13:00 CET (UTC+1)	Avdić 24'; Markkanen (yellow card) 51'	Report	Skrabb 31'; Nilsson (yellow card) 79'	Stadium: Skytteholms IP; Attendance: 250; Referee: Johan Krantz

26 March 2016	AIK	1–0	Inter Turku	Stockholm
13:00 CET (UTC+1)	Isak 26'; Väisänen (yellow card) 83'	Report	Duah (yellow card) 6'; Kauppi (yellow card) 17'; Obilor (yellow card) 45'	Stadium: Skytteholms IP; Attendance: 523; Referee: Mohammed Al-Hakim

15 June 2016	AIK	1–1	FC Flora Tallinn	Stockholm
16:30 CEST (UTC+2)	Sundgren 79' (pen.)	Report	Prosa 85'	Stadium: Kristinebergs IP; Attendance: 300; Referee: Patrik Eriksson

21 July 2016	HIFK Fotboll	2–2	AIK	Helsinki, Finland
18:30 CEST (UTC+2)	Rantanen 81'; Mäkelä 87'; Mapoka (yellow card) 90'; Mustonen (yellow card) 90+4'	Report	Isak 22'; Strandberg 30'; Yasin (red card) 90+3'	Stadium: Sonera Stadium; Attendance: 974; Referee: Marko Grönholm

18 November 2016	AIK	0–1	VPS	Stockholm
15:00 CET (UTC+1)		Report	Strandvall 46' (yellow card) 76'; Voutilainen (yellow card) 69'	Stadium: Skytteholms IP; Attendance: 196; Referee: Mohamed Nablsi

25 November 2016	AIK	2–1	Dalkurd FF	Stockholm
15:00 CET (UTC+1)	Avdić 20'; Bellander 83'	Report	Rashidi (yellow card) 66'; Bala 84'	Stadium: Skytteholms IP; Attendance: 522; Referee: Björn Särnbrink

== Competitions ==
=== Overview ===
Competition	First match	Last match	Starting round	Final position	Record							
Competition	First match	Last match	Starting round	Final position	Pld	W	D	L	GF	GA	GD	Win %
Allsvenskan	3 April 2016	6 November 2016	Matchday 1	2nd	30	17	9	4	52	26	+26	56.67
2015–16 Svenska Cupen	20 February 2016	15 March 2016	From to 2015 season	Quarterfinal	4	3	1	0	11	3	+8	75.00
2016–17 Svenska Cupen	24 August 2016	Progress to 2017 season	Second round	Progress to 2017 season	1	1	0	0	2	0	+2	100.00
UEFA Europa League	30 June 2016	4 August 2016	First qualifying round	Third qualifying round	6	3	1	2	6	3	+3	50.00
Total					41	24	11	6	71	32	+39	58.54

Last updated: 6 November 2016
Source: Competitions

=== Allsvenskan ===
==== League table ====
Pos	Team	Pld	W	D	L	GF	GA	GD	Pts	Qualification or relegation
1	Malmö FF (C)	30	21	3	6	60	26	+34	66	Qualification for the Champions League second qualifying round
2	AIK	30	17	9	4	52	26	+26	60	Qualification for the Europa League first qualifying round
3	IFK Norrköping	30	18	6	6	59	37	+22	60	Qualification for the Europa League first qualifying round
4	IFK Göteborg	30	14	8	8	56	47	+9	50	
5	IF Elfsborg	30	13	9	8	58	38	+20	48	

Source: svenskfotboll.se (in Swedish)
Rules for classification: 1) Points; 2) Goal difference; 3) Goals scored; 4) Head-to-head points; 5) Head-to-head goal difference; 6) Head-to-head away goals scored; 7) Play-off
(Note: Play-off is only played if need to decide champion, teams for relegation or UEFA competition and will be played on a neutral ground).
(C) Champions

==== Results summary ====
Overall								Home						Away					
Pld	W	D	L	GF	GA	GD	Pts	W	D	L	GF	GA	GD	W	D	L	GF	GA	GD
30	17	9	4	52	26	+26	60	9	6	0	27	9	+18	8	3	4	25	17	+8

Last updated: 6 November 2016.
Source: (in Swedish)

==== Results by round ====
Round	1	2	3	4	5	6	7	8	9	10	11	12	13	14	15	16	17	18	19	20	21	22	23	24	25	26	27	28	29	30
Ground	H	A	H	A	H	A	H	A	H	A	A	H	A	H	A	H	A	H	A	H	A	H	A	A	H	H	A	H	A	H
Result	D	W	D	L	W	L	D	W	W	W	W	D	D	D	W	W	L	W	W	D	W	W	W	D	W	W	L	W	D	W
Position	9	4	6	10	9	9	11	9	4	4	4	4	5	5	5	3	3	3	3	3	3	3	3	3	3	2	3	2	2	2

Updated to match(es) played on 6 November 2016. Source: see Results
A = Away; H = Home; W = Win; D = Draw; L = Loss

==== Results ====
3 April 2016 1	AIK	1–1	GIF Sundsvall	Stockholm
15:00 CEST (UTC+2)	Brustad 43'; Ishizaki (yellow card) 66'	Report	Tranberg (yellow card) 21'; Sigurjónsson 42'	Stadium: Friends Arena; Attendance: 23,460; Referee: Jonas Eriksson

7 April 2016 2	Östersund	0–2	AIK	Östersund
19:00 CEST (UTC+2)	Papagiannopoulos (yellow card) 59'	Report	Johansson (yellow card) 35'; Strandberg 36'; Isak (yellow card) 40' (goal) 50'; Karlsson (yellow card) 77'	Stadium: Jämtkraft Arena; Attendance: 7,371; Referee: Glenn Nyberg

11 April 2016 3	AIK	3–3	IFK Göteborg	Stockholm
19:00 CEST (UTC+2)	Hauksson 9' (yellow card) 57'; Yasin (yellow card) 47'; Ishizaki 54'; Brustad 79'	Report	Hysén 29', 62'; Aleesami (yellow card) 34'; Albæk (yellow card) 37'; Jónsson 58'; Alvbåge (yellow card) 90+2'	Stadium: Friends Arena; Attendance: 19,222; Referee: Bojan Pandžić

17 April 2016 4	IFK Norrköping	4–1	AIK	Norrköping
15:00 CEST (UTC+2)	Nyman 23'; Karlsson 49' (o.g.); Andersson 62'; Tkalčić 90+4'	Report	Ofori (yellow card) 9'; Karlsson (yellow card) 43'; Strandberg 60'	Stadium: Nya Parken; Attendance: 14,150; Referee: Stefan Johannesson

25 April 2016 5	AIK	2–1	Elfsborg	Stockholm
19:00 CEST (UTC+2)	Isak 14'; Hooiveld (yellow card) 29'; Salétros (yellow card) 32' (goal) 44'; Johansson (yellow card) 55'; Strandberg (yellow card) 58'	Report	Prodell 19'; Lundqvist (yellow card) 65'; Hedlund (yellow card) 87'; Frick (yellow card) 90+2'	Stadium: Friends Arena; Attendance: 13,422; Referee: Kristoffer Karlsson

28 April 2016 6	Helsingborg	2–1	AIK	Helsingborg
19:00 CEST (UTC+2)	Larsson 6', 75'; Helstrup (yellow card) 35'	Report	Salétros (yellow card) 19'; Strandberg 21'; Ofori (yellow card) 67'; Sundgren (yellow card) 77'	Stadium: Olympia; Attendance: 6,642; Referee: Johan Hamlin

2 May 2016 7	AIK	0–0	Jönköpings Södra	Stockholm
19:00 CEST (UTC+2)	Ishizaki (yellow card) 47'; Ofori (yellow card) 50'	Report	Siwe (yellow card) 40' (yellow-red card) 78'; Cibicki (yellow card) 87'	Stadium: Friends Arena; Attendance: 12,242; Referee: Mohammed Al-Hakim

8 May 2016 8	BK Häcken	2–3	AIK	Gothenburg
17:30 CEST (UTC+2)	Paulinho 32', 80'; Sudić (yellow card) 71'; Abubakari (yellow card) 76'	Report	Strandberg 24', 84'; Yasin 28' (yellow card) 86'; Sundgren (yellow card) 44'; Hooiveld (yellow card) 45'; Gravius (yellow card) 53'; Brustad (yellow card) 90+1'	Stadium: Bravida Arena; Attendance: 3,514; Referee: Kaspar Sjöberg

16 May 2016 9	AIK	2–0	Djurgården	Stockholm
19:00 CEST (UTC+2)	Ishizaki 12' (yellow card) 67'; Hauksson 51'	Report	Colley (yellow card) 73'	Stadium: Friends Arena; Attendance: 26,109; Referee: Bojan Pandžić

20 May 2016 10	Falkenberg	2–3	AIK	Falkenberg
19:00 CEST (UTC+2)	Juel-Nielsen 39', 81'	Report	Ofori (yellow card) 9'; Strandberg 17', 53'; Hauksson 45+1'	Stadium: Falkenbergs IP; Attendance: 3,292; Referee: Per Melin

23 May 2016 11	Gefle	0–1	AIK	Gävle
19:00 CEST (UTC+2)		Report	Isak (yellow card) 47' (goal) 53'; Gravius (yellow card) 85'	Stadium: Gavlevallen; Attendance: 5,065; Referee: Mohammed Al-Hakim

28 May 2016 12	AIK	0–0	Örebro	Stockholm
16:00 CEST (UTC+2)	Hauksson (yellow card) 54'; Yasin (yellow card) 76'	Report	Gerzić (yellow card) 59'	Stadium: Friends Arena; Attendance: 18,882; Referee: Andreas Ekberg

10 July 2016 13	Kalmar	1–1	AIK	Kalmar
17:30 CEST (UTC+2)	Elm 3' (yellow card) 52'; Ingelsson (yellow card) 90+1'	Report	Ishizaki 33'; Kpozo (yellow card) 70'; Strandberg (yellow card) 78'	Stadium: Guldfågeln Arena; Attendance: 8,599; Referee: Glenn Nyberg

17 July 2016 14	AIK	1–1	Malmö	Stockholm
17:30 CEST (UTC+2)	Avdić 44'; Sundgren (yellow card) 66'	Report	Kjartansson 15'	Stadium: Friends Arena; Attendance: 15,847; Referee: Martin Strömbergsson

24 July 2016 15	Hammarby	0–3	AIK	Stockholm
15:00 CEST (UTC+2)	Magyar (yellow card) 48'; Haglund (yellow card) 83'	Report	Hauksson 11'; Markkanen 17'; Ofori 38'; Johansson (yellow card) 61'	Stadium: Tele2 Arena; Attendance: 26,618; Referee: Mohammed Al-Hakim

31 July 2016 16	AIK	2–0	Falkenberg	Stockholm
17:30 CEST (UTC+2)	Markkanen 1', 37'; Yasin (yellow card) 21'; Kpozo (yellow card) 35'; Sundgren (yellow card) 57'; Väisänen (yellow card) 67'	Report	Carvalho (yellow card) 58'; Araba (yellow card) 85'	Stadium: Friends Arena; Attendance: 10,875; Referee: Robert Daradic

7 August 2016 17	Malmö	2–0	AIK	Malmö
13:00 CEST (UTC+2)	Eikrem 43'; Árnason (yellow card) 46'; Bengtsson (yellow card) 88'; Christiansen 90+3'	Report	Karlsson (yellow card) 10'; Ofori (yellow card) 50'	Stadium: Swedbank Stadion; Attendance: 20,150; Referee: Markus Strömbergsson

14 August 2016 18	AIK	2–1	Helsingborg	Stockholm
16:00 CEST (UTC+2)	Yasin (yellow card) 21'; Markkanen 63'; Hooiveld (yellow card) 76'; Sundgren 83' (pen.)	Report	Rusike (yellow card) 22'; Christensen (yellow card) 30'; Väisänen 47' (o.g.)	Stadium: Friends Arena; Attendance: 11,693; Referee: Anders Ekberg

21 August 2016 19	Örebro	0–2	AIK	Örebro
17:30 CEST (UTC+2)	Gerzić (yellow card) 79'; Persson (yellow card) 87'	Report	Obasi 37'; Karlsson (yellow card) 39'; Affane (yellow card) 40'; Carlgren (yellow card) 40'; Isak 90+2'	Stadium: Behrn Arena; Attendance: 9,517; Referee: Kristoffer Karlsson

28 August 2016 20	AIK	0–0	Hammarby	Stockholm
15:00 CEST (UTC+2)	Ishizaki (yellow card) 34'; Ofori (yellow card) 50'; Johansson (yellow card) 90+1'; Isak (yellow card) 90+2'	Report	Smárason (yellow card) 25'; Persson (yellow card) 25'; Israelsson (yellow card) 71'; Aidoo (yellow card) 90+2'	Stadium: Friends Arena; Attendance: 30,843; Referee: Stefan Johannesson

11 September 2016 21	GIF Sundsvall	1–3	AIK	Sundsvall
15:00 CEST (UTC+2)	Johansson 71' (o.g.); Silva (yellow card) 76'	Report	Avdić 17'; Tranberg 19' (o.g.); Markkanen 36'; Affane (yellow card) 40'	Stadium: Norrporten Arena; Attendance: 4,578; Referee: Glenn Nyberg

18 September 2016 22	AIK	1–0	Gefle	Stockholm
15:00 CEST (UTC+2)	Ofori (yellow card) 43'; Markkanen 81'	Report	Bååth (yellow card) 75'	Stadium: Friends Arena; Attendance: 13,056; Referee: Kaspar Sjöberg

21 September 2016 23	Djurgården	0–3	AIK	Stockholm
19:00 CEST (UTC+2)	Ranégie (yellow card) 66'; Björkström (yellow card) 68'; Ceesay (yellow card) 90+3'	Report	Isak 15', 65'; Obasi 76'; Ofori (yellow card) 82'	Stadium: Tele2 Arena; Attendance: 22,197; Referee: Stefan Johannesson

25 September 2016 24	Elfsborg	2–2	AIK	Borås
15:00 CEST (UTC+2)	Prodell 33'; Frick 75' (yellow card) 88'; Hauger (yellow card) 87'	Report	Obasi 30', 31'; Johansson (yellow card) 77'	Stadium: Borås Arena; Attendance: 8,045; Referee: Mohammed Al-Hakim

2 October 2016 25	AIK	6–0	IFK Norrköping	Stockholm
17:30 CEST (UTC+2)	Ishizaki 31'; Isak 36', 74'; Ofori 57'; Obasi 63'; Markkanen 87'	Report		Stadium: Friends Arena; Attendance: 17,157; Referee: Jonas Eriksson

16 October 2016 26	AIK	2–0	Östersund	Stockholm
15:00 CEST (UTC+2)	Isak 10'; Hauksson (yellow card) 72'; Obasi 83'	Report		Stadium: Friends Arena; Attendance: 13,053; Referee: Mohammed Al-Hakim

24 October 2016 27	IFK Göteborg	1–0	AIK	Gothenburg
19:00 CEST (UTC+2)	Ómarsson 26'; Rieks (yellow card) 27'; Jamieson (yellow card) 90'	Report	Sundgren (yellow card) 12'; Isak (yellow card) 17'; Salétros (yellow card) 58'	Stadium: Gamla Ullevi; Attendance: 13,132; Referee: Andreas Ekberg

27 October 2016 28	AIK	2–1	BK Häcken	Stockholm
19:00 CEST (UTC+2)	Väisänen 24'; Markkanen 81'	Report	Owoeri 44' (yellow card) 88'; Schüller (yellow card) 63'	Stadium: Friends Arena; Attendance: 8,507; Referee: Jonas Eriksson

31 October 2016 29	Jönköpings Södra	0–0	AIK	Jönköping
19:00 CET (UTC+1)		Report		Stadium: Stadsparksvallen; Attendance: 4,813; Referee: Mohammed Al-Hakim

6 November 2016 30	AIK	3–1	Kalmar	Stockholm
15:00 CET (UTC+1)	Isak 41'; Sundgren 48' (pen.); Blomberg (yellow card) 67'; Hauksson (yellow card) 73'; Ofori 75'	Report	Romário 10'; Biskupović (yellow card) 58'	Stadium: Friends Arena; Attendance: 12,076; Referee: Andreas Ekberg

=== Svenska Cupen ===
==== 2015–16 ====
===== Group stage =====
Pos	Team	Pld	W	D	L	GF	GA	GD	Pts	Qualification
1	AIK	3	3	0	0	10	2	+8	9	Advance to Knockout stage
2	Falkenbergs FF	3	1	1	1	4	3	+1	4	
3	Varbergs BoIS	3	1	1	1	3	3	0	4	
4	Tenhults IF	3	0	0	3	0	9	−9	0	

Source: Swedish Football Association
Rules for classification: 1) Points; 2) Goal difference; 3) Goals scored; 4) Head-to-head record; 5) Highest ranked team

20 February 2016 1	AIK	2–1	Varbergs BoIS	Stockholm
14:00 CET (UTC+1)	Brustad 20'; Hauksson (yellow card) 47'; Avdić 70'	Report	Asp (yellow card) 29'; Peter (yellow card) 30' (goal) 74'; Zekolli (yellow card) 53'	Stadium: Skytteholms IP; Attendance: 2,632; Referee: Stefan Johannesson

28 February 2016 2	Tenhults IF	0–6	AIK	Jönköping
14:00 CET (UTC+1)	Rosenqvist (yellow card) 49'; Bbakka (yellow card) 51' (yellow-red card) 88'	Report	Markkanen 14'; Affane 24'; Väisänen (yellow card) 59' (goal) 84'; Hauksson 67'; Nikolić 82'; Isak 86'	Stadium: Elmiahallen; Attendance: 1,852; Referee: Johan Hamlin

5 March 2016 3	AIK	2–1	Falkenberg	Stockholm
14:00 CET (UTC+1)	Yasin 7'; Hauksson 36'; Karlsson (yellow card) 65'	Report	Krizanović 13'; Karlsson (yellow card) 22'	Stadium: Skytteholms IP; Attendance: 3,052; Referee: Markus Strömbergsson

===== Knockout phase =====
15 March 2016 Quarterfinal	AIK	1–1 (a.e.t.) (2–4 p)	Hammarby	Stockholm
18:30 CET (UTC+1)	Salétros (yellow card) 18'; Yasin (yellow card) 51'; Hooiveld 61'; Markkanen (yellow card) 64'; Hauksson (yellow card) 102'	Report	Smárason 45' (yellow card) 60'; Alex (yellow card) 79'; Haglund (yellow card) 82'	Stadium: Friends Arena; Attendance: 23,860; Referee: Mohammed Al-Hakim
	Penalties
	Yasin (penalty scored); Hooiveld (penalty missed); Johansson (penalty scored); Markkanen (penalty missed)		(penalty missed) Haglund; (penalty scored) Smárason; (penalty scored) Khalili; (penalty scored) Alex; (penalty scored) Kristinsson

==== 2016–17 ====
24 August 2016 Second round	IFK Luleå	0–2	AIK	Luleå
18:00 CEST (UTC+2)	Andersson (yellow card) 71'	Report	Isak 29', 81'; Blomberg (yellow card) 44'; Etuhu (yellow card) 72'	Stadium: Skogsvallen; Attendance: 2,247; Referee: Lars Olsson

=== UEFA Europa League ===
==== Qualifying rounds ====
30 June 2016 First qualifying round 1st leg	AIK (Sweden)	2–0	(Wales) Bala Town	Stockholm, Sweden
19:30 CEST (UTC+2)	Affane 27'; Johansson 52'	Report	Thompson (yellow card) 54'	Stadium: Tele2 Arena; Attendance: 6,127; Referee: Kirill Levnikov (Russia)
Note: AIK played their first qualifying round home match at Tele2 Arena, Stockholm, instead of their regular stadium Friends Arena, Solna.

7 July 2016 First qualifying round 2nd leg	Bala Town (Wales)	0–2 (0–4 agg.)	(Sweden) AIK	Rhyl, Wales
20:30 CEST (UTC+2)	Connolly (yellow card) 60'	Report	Avdić 8'; Strandberg 24'	Stadium: Belle Vue; Attendance: 890; Referee: Fedayi San (Switzerland)
Note: Bala Town played their home match at Belle Vue, Rhyl, instead of their regular stadium Maes Tegid, Bala.

14 July 2016 Second qualifying round 1st leg	AIK (Sweden)	1–0	(Gibraltar) Europa	Stockholm, Sweden
20:00 CEST (UTC+2)	Isak (yellow card) 19'; Ishizaki (yellow card) 34'; Ofori (yellow card) 61'; Hauksson (yellow card) 73'; Strandberg 89'; Hooiveld (yellow card) 90+1'	Report	Yahaya (yellow card) 24'; Roldán (yellow card) 56'; Quillo (yellow card) 70'; Muñoz (yellow card) 87'; Toni (yellow card) 88'; Vázquez (yellow card) 90'; Copi (yellow card) 90+1'	Stadium: Friends Arena; Attendance: 5,250; Referee: Ognjen Valjić (Bosnia and Herzegovina)

21 July 2016 Second qualifying round 2nd leg	Europa (Gibraltar)	0–1 (0–2 agg.)	(Sweden) AIK	Gibraltar
19:00 CEST (UTC+2)	Carrión (yellow card) 56'; Moya (yellow card) 68'	Report	Markkanen 55' (yellow card) 69'	Stadium: Victoria Stadium; Attendance: 1,145; Referee: Ádám Farkas (Hungary)

28 July 2016 Third qualifying round 1st leg	Panathinaikos (Greece)	1–0	(Sweden) AIK	Athens, Greece
20:00 CEST (UTC+2)	Wakaso (yellow card) 59'; Moledo 79'; Mesto (yellow card) 85'	Report	Hauksson (yellow card) 25'; Kpozo (yellow card) 28'; Johansson (yellow card) 90+3'	Stadium: Leoforos Alexandras Stadium; Attendance: 12,021; Referee: Bastian Dankert (Germany)

4 August 2016 Second qualifying round 2nd leg	AIK (Sweden)	0–2 (0–3 agg.)	(Greece) Panathinaikos	Stockholm, Sweden
19:00 CEST (UTC+2)	Johansson (yellow card) 42'; Ofori (yellow card) 48'; Markkanen (yellow card) 50'	Report	Ledesma (yellow card) 16'; Ibarbo 46'; Koutroumpis (yellow card) 67'; Berg 73'; Steele (yellow card) 80'	Stadium: Tele2 Arena; Attendance: 15,175; Referee: Tony Chapron (France)
Note: AIK played their Third qualifying round home match at Tele2 Arena, Stockholm, instead of their regular stadium Friends Arena, Solna.

== Squad statistics ==
As of match played 6 November 2016

=== Appearances and goals ===
No.	Pos	Nat	Player	Total		Allsvenskan		2015–16 Svenska Cupen		2016–17 Svenska Cupen		UEFA Europa League	
No.	Pos	Nat	Player	Apps	Goals	Apps	Goals	Apps	Goals	Apps	Goals	Apps	Goals
2	DF	(Iceland) ISL	Haukur Hauksson	27	6	15+3	4	4	2	1	0	4	0
3	DF	(Sweden) SWE	Per Karlsson	31	0	26	0	1	0	0	0	4	0
4	DF	(Sweden) SWE	Nils-Eric Johansson	38	1	28	0	4	0	1	0	5	1
7	FW	(Nigeria) NGR	Chinedu Obasi	10	6	9+1	6	0	0	0	0	0	0
8	MF	(Sweden) SWE	Johan Blomberg	31	0	16+5	0	0+3	0	1	0	4+2	0
9	FW	(Sweden) SWE	Marko Nikolić	1	1	0	0	1	1	0	0	0	0
10	FW	(Sweden) SWE	Denni Avdić	23	4	8+7	2	2	1	1	0	3+2	1
11	FW	(Finland) FIN	Eero Markkanen	30	10	9+13	8	2+2	1	0+1	0	3	1
14	FW	(Nigeria) NGR	John Chibuike	7	0	0+7	0	0	0	0	0	0	0
15	DF	(Finland) FIN	Sauli Väisänen	29	2	18+4	1	3+1	1	1	0	2	0
16	MF	(Sweden) SWE	Rickson Mansiamina	1	0	0	0	0+1	0	0	0	0	0
17	MF	(Ghana) GHA	Ebenezer Ofori	34	3	24+3	3	0+1	0	0	0	6	0
19	MF	(Iraq) IRQ	Ahmed Yasin	27	2	12+6	1	1+3	1	1	0	0+4	0
20	MF	(Nigeria) NGR	Dickson Etuhu	3	0	1+1	0	0	0	1	0	0	0
21	DF	(Sweden) SWE	Daniel Sundgren	32	0	24	0	2	0	0	0	5+1	0
24	MF	(Sweden) SWE	Stefan Ishizaki	33	4	26+1	4	0	0	0	0	5+1	0
26	DF	(Netherlands) NED	Jos Hooiveld	18	1	11	0	3	1	1	0	3	0
29	MF	(Sweden) SWE	Anton Salétros	28	1	15+4	1	4	0	0	0	2+3	0
31	MF	(Sweden) SWE	Christos Gravius	15	0	3+6	0	4	0	0	0	2	0
32	DF	(Ghana) GHA	Patrick Kpozo	17	0	11	0	0	0	1	0	4+1	0
34	GK	(Sweden) SWE	Oscar Linnér	3	0	2	0	0	0	1	0	0	0
35	GK	(Sweden) SWE	Patrik Carlgren	38	0	28	0	4	0	0	0	6	0
36	FW	(Sweden) SWE	Alexander Isak	29	13	19+5	10	0+1	1	1	2	2+1	0
39	MF	(Sweden) SWE	Amin Affane	27	2	7+12	0	3	1	0	0	4+1	1
Players away on loan:
18	DF	(Sweden) SWE	Noah Sundberg	1	0	0	0	1	0	0	0	0	0
28	MF	(Sweden) SWE	Niclas Eliasson	9	0	3+2	0	4	0	0	0	0	0
Players who appeared for AIK but left during the season:
7	FW	(Norway) NOR	Fredrik Brustad	14	3	4+7	2	3	1	0	0	0	0
22	FW	(Sweden) SWE	Carlos Strandberg	15	9	11+1	7	0	0	0	0	2+1	2

=== Goal scorers ===
Place	Position	Nation	Number	Name	Allsvenskan	2015–16 Svenska Cupen	2016–17 Svenska Cupen	UEFA Europa League	Total
1	FW	(Sweden)	36	Alexander Isak	10	1	2	0	13
2	FW	(Finland)	11	Eero Markkanen	8	1	0	1	10
3	FW	(Sweden)	22	Carlos Strandberg	7	0	0	2	9
4	FW	(Nigeria)	7	Chinedu Obasi	6	0	0	0	6
4	DF	(Iceland)	2	Haukur Hauksson	4	2	0	0	6
6	MF	(Sweden)	24	Stefan Ishizaki	4	0	0	0	4
6	FW	(Sweden)	10	Denni Avdić	2	1	0	1	4
8	MF	(Ghana)	17	Ebenezer Ofori	3	0	0	0	3
8	FW	(Norway)	7	Fredrik Brustad	2	1	0	0	3
10	DF	(Sweden)	21	Daniel Sundgren	2	0	0	0	2
10	MF	(Sweden)	39	Amin Affane	0	1	0	1	2
10	DF	(Finland)	15	Sauli Väisänen	1	1	0	0	2
10	MF	(Iraq)	19	Ahmed Yasin	1	1	0	0	2
14	DF	(Sweden)	29	Anton Salétros	1	0	0	0	1
14	FW	(Sweden)	9	Marko Nikolić	0	1	0	0	1
14	DF	(Netherlands)	26	Jos Hooiveld	0	1	0	0	1
14	DF	(Sweden)	4	Nils-Eric Johansson	0	0	0	1	1
14				Own goal	1	0	0	0	1
TOTALS					52	11	2	6	71

=== Clean sheets ===
Place	Position	Nation	Number	Name	Allsvenskan	2015–16 Svenska Cupen	2016–17 Svenska Cupen	UEFA Europa League	Total
1	GK	(Sweden)	35	Patrik Carlgren	13	1	0	4	18
3	GK	(Sweden)	34	Oscar Linnér	1	0	1	0	2
TOTALS					14	1	1	4	20

=== Disciplinary record ===
Number	Nation	Position	Name	Allsvenskan		2015–16 Svenska Cupen		2016–17 Svenska Cupen		UEFA Europa League		Total	
Number	Nation	Position	Name	Yellow card	Red card	Yellow card	Red card	Yellow card	Red card	Yellow card	Red card	Yellow card	Red card
2	(Iceland)	DF	Haukur Hauksson	4	0	2	0	0	0	2	0	8	0
3	(Sweden)	DF	Per Karlsson	4	0	1	0	0	0	0	0	5	0
4	(Sweden)	DF	Nils-Eric Johansson	5	0	0	0	0	0	2	0	7	0
8	(Sweden)	MF	Johan Blomberg	1	0	0	0	1	0	0	0	2	0
11	(Finland)	FW	Eero Markkanen	0	0	1	0	0	0	2	0	3	0
15	(Finland)	DF	Sauli Väisänen	1	0	1	0	0	0	0	0	2	0
17	(Ghana)	MF	Ebenezer Ofori	8	0	0	0	0	0	2	0	10	0
19	(Iraq)	MF	Ahmed Yasin	5	0	1	0	0	0	0	0	6	0
20	(Nigeria)	MF	Dickson Etuhu	0	0	0	0	1	0	0	0	1	0
21	(Sweden)	DF	Daniel Sundgren	5	0	0	0	0	0	0	0	5	0
24	(Sweden)	MF	Stefan Ishizaki	4	0	0	0	0	0	1	0	5	0
26	(Netherlands)	DF	Jos Hooiveld	4	0	0	0	0	0	1	0	5	0
29	(Sweden)	MF	Anton Salétros	3	0	1	0	0	0	0	0	4	0
31	(Sweden)	MF	Christos Gravius	2	0	0	0	0	0	0	0	2	0
32	(Ghana)	DF	Patrick Kpozo	2	0	0	0	0	0	1	0	3	0
35	(Sweden)	MF	Patrik Carlgren	1	0	0	0	0	0	0	0	1	0
36	(Sweden)	FW	Alexander Isak	4	0	0	0	0	0	1	0	5	0
39	(Sweden)	MF	Amin Affane	2	0	0	0	0	0	0	0	2	0
Players away on loan:
Players who left AIK during the season:
7	(Norway)	FW	Fredrik Brustad	1	0	0	0	0	0	0	0	1	0
22	(Sweden)	FW	Carlos Strandberg	2	0	0	0	0	0	0	0	2	0
Total				58	0	7	0	2	0	12	0	79	0
