= Per Karlsson =

Per Karlsson is the name of:

- Per Karlsson (footballer, born 1986) (born 1986), Swedish footballer who played for AIK in Allsvenskan
- Per Karlsson (footballer, born 1989) (born 1986), Swedish footballer who played for Falkenbergs FF in Allsvenskan
- Per Karlsson (hammer thrower), winner of the 1990 weight throw at the NCAA Division I Indoor Track and Field Championships
