= Alexander Isak =

Swedish footballer (born 1999)

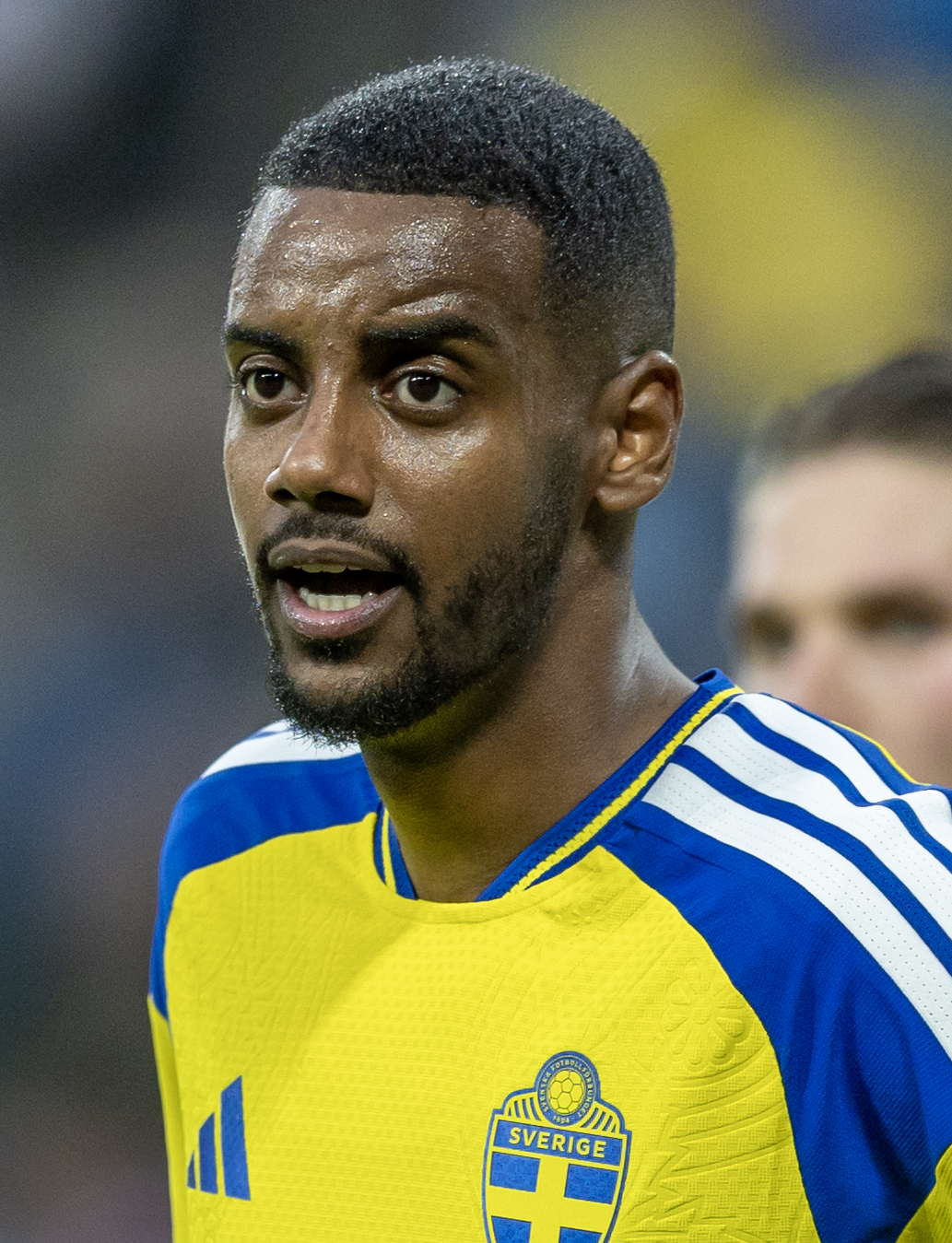
- Isak with Sweden in 2026

Personal information
- Full name: Alexander Isak
- Date of birth: 21 September 1999 (age 27)
- Place of birth: Stockholm, Sweden
- Height: 1.90 m (6 ft 3 in)
- Position: Striker

Team information
- Current team: Liverpool
- Number: 9

Youth career
- 2005–2016: AIK

Senior career*
Years	Team	Apps	(Gls)
2016–2017	AIK	24	(10)
2017–2019	Borussia Dortmund II	12	(5)
2017–2019	Borussia Dortmund	5	(0)
2019	→ Willem II (loan)	16	(13)
2019–2022	Real Sociedad	105	(33)
2022–2025	Newcastle United	86	(54)
2025–	Liverpool	24	(10)

International career^{‡}
2015–2016	Sweden U17	19	(6)
2016–2017	Sweden U19	6	(2)
2016–2018	Sweden U21	7	(0)
2017–	Sweden	64	(19)
- * Club domestic league appearances and goals as of 18:38, 22 November 2026 (UTC) ‡ National team caps and goals as of 21:49, 14 November 2026 (UTC)

Alexander Isak (Note: Swedish pronunciation: [alɛkˈsǎnːdɛr ˈîːsak]) (born 21 September 1999) is a Swedish professional footballer who plays as a striker for Premier League club Liverpool and the Sweden national team.

Born and raised in Stockholm, Isak began his professional career with boyhood club AIK in 2016. He then went on to represent Borussia Dortmund and Willem II before signing with Real Sociedad in 2019. In 2022, Isak joined Newcastle United for a club-record fee. In 2025, he signed for Liverpool for £125 million, breaking both the club and British transfer fee records.

A full Swedish international since 2017, Isak has won over 60 caps for his national team, and represented the side at UEFA Euro 2020 and the 2026 FIFA World Cup. He is the youngest-ever goalscorer for both AIK and the Sweden national team.

== Early life ==
Alexander Isak was born on 21 September 1999 in Stockholm. He is of Eritrean descent from the Tigrinya ethnic group. He was raised in Solna, in central Stockholm County, by his parents. The youngest of six siblings, he started playing for the youth team of one of the largest clubs in the Allsvenskan, AIK. Isak has supported AIK since he was six years old.

== Club career ==
=== AIK ===
Isak made his first-team debut for AIK on 28 February 2016, appearing as a substitute in the 75th minute of the Swedish Cup away match against fourth-tier side Tenhults. At age 16, Isak scored a goal in the 6–0 victory. On 7 April, AIK head coach Andreas Alm included Isak in the starting line-up of the Allsvenskan away fixture against Östersund, alongside fellow young striker Carlos Strandberg, and scored the second goal in a 2–0 win, thus becoming the youngest scorer for AIK in Allsvenskan history at the age of 16 years and 199 days.

On 25 April, Isak scored his first goal at AIK's home ground, Friends Arena, opening the score in a 2–1 victory against Elfsborg. On 3 May, Isak signed his first professional contract through the end of the 2018 season, having impressed in his first few games, and establishing himself as a first-team regular. Between matchdays 8 and 9, head coach Alm was sacked, but Isak was confirmed in the line-up by new manager Rikard Norling.

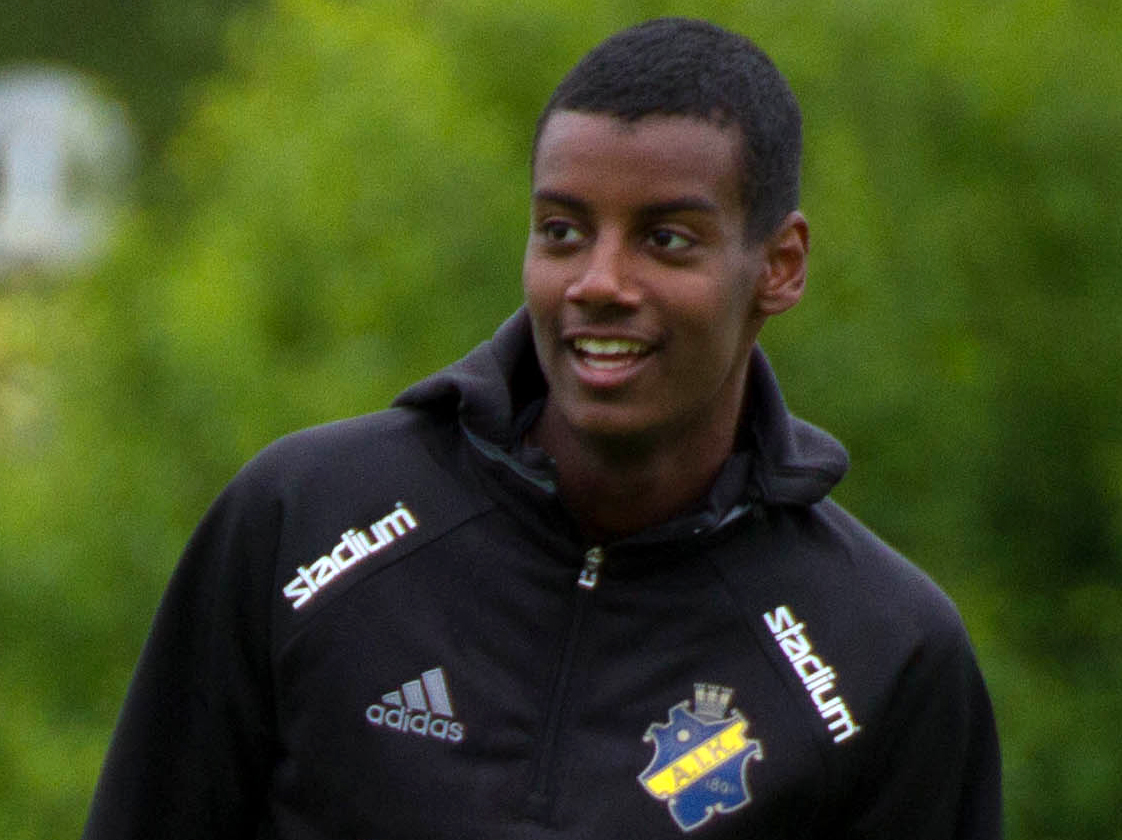
Isak training with AIK in 2016

On 21 September, Isak's 17th birthday, he scored two critical goals in AIK's 3–0 derby win over arch-rivals Djurgårdens. He was later described by teammate Chinedu Obasi as "Sweden's new Zlatan Ibrahimović".

=== Borussia Dortmund ===
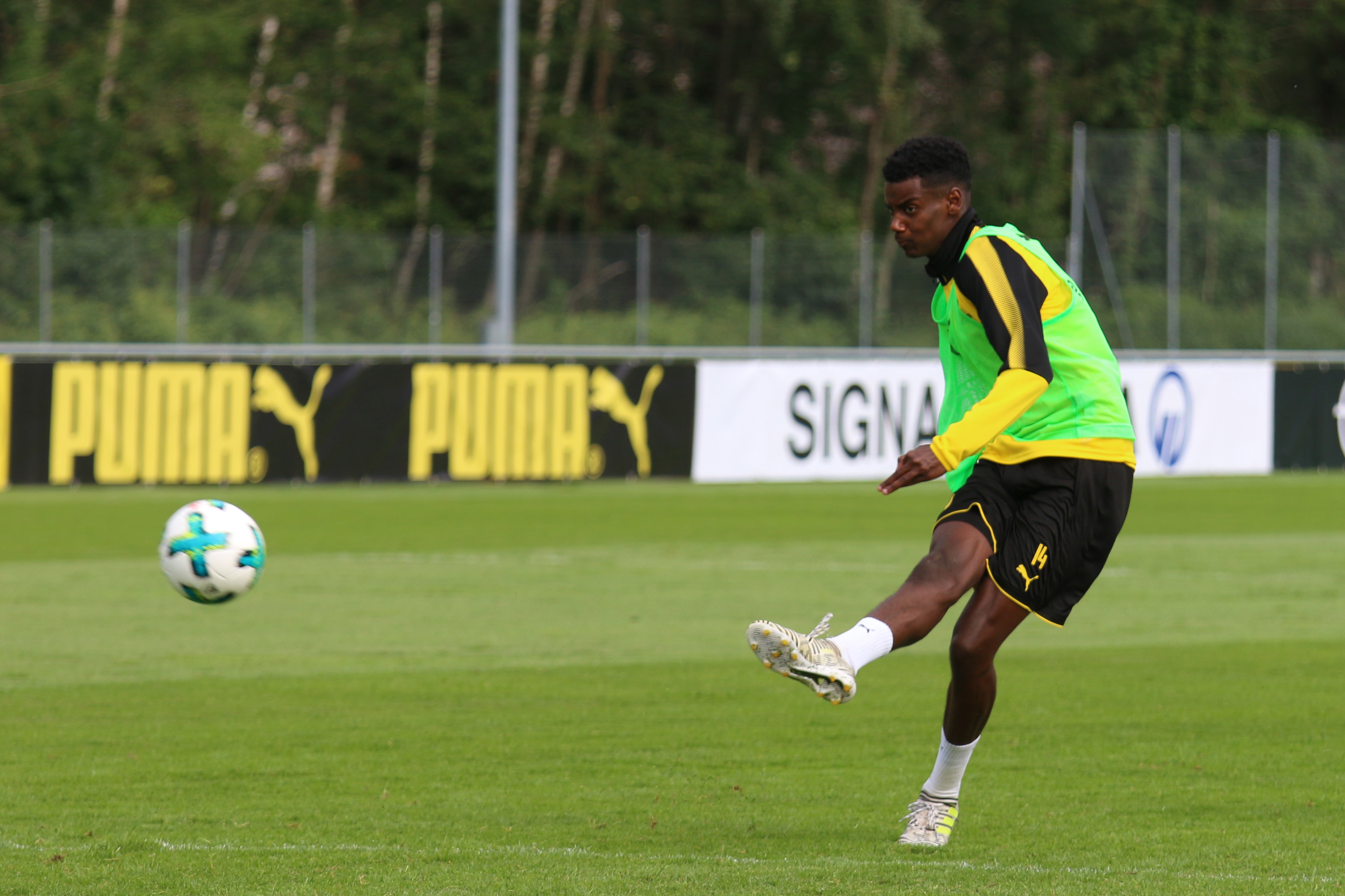
Isak training with Borussia Dortmund in 2017

On 23 January 2017, Isak signed for Bundesliga club Borussia Dortmund on a long-term contract, lasting until the summer of 2022. The transfer fee was undisclosed, but reports suggested that it was set at €9 million, which would be the highest transfer fee ever paid for an Allsvenskan player at that time. Before signing with Dortmund, Isak reportedly turned down a move to Real Madrid. Isak made his first appearance for the club in a 3–0 cup win over Sportfreunde Lotte on 14 March 2017. Isak won his first medal with the club when Dortmund won the 2016–17 DFB-Pokal, only appearing once in the tournament, and not being in the squad for the final.

He scored his first competitive goal for Dortmund in a 2017–18 DFB-Pokal second round win against 1. FC Magdeburg on 24 October 2017, scoring the second goal in a 5–0 win.

==== Loan to Willem II ====
After making no appearances in the 2018–19 Bundesliga season for Dortmund, Isak was loaned to Dutch Eredivisie club Willem II. On 28 February 2019, he scored the equaliser and the winning penalty against AZ in the semi-finals of the KNVB Cup, helping Willem II reach the Dutch cup final for the first time since 2005. On 30 March, he became the first player ever to score three penalties in an Eredivisie match, in a 3–2 win against Fortuna Sittard. On 14 April, Isak became the first foreign-born player in the Eredivisie to score 12 goals in his first 12 league games.

=== Real Sociedad ===
On 12 June 2019, Isak signed a five-year deal with Real Sociedad, joining the La Liga club on 1 July, in which he scored his first goal in his first game. He continued the pre-season strongly, scoring four goals in five games. Isak scored his first competitive goal for Real Sociedad in a 3–1 La Liga win against Espanyol on 22 September. On 6 February, he scored two goals and made an assist in the Copa del Rey quarter-final against Real Madrid. On 9 February, he scored the winning goal in the Basque derby against Athletic Bilbao.

On 3 April 2021, Isak won his first silverware with the club when he started and played in 89 minutes of the 2020 Copa del Rey Final in a 1–0 win against Athletic Bilbao, helping Real Sociedad win the 2019–20 Copa del Rey. He scored his first hat-trick for the club on 21 February 2021 in a 4–0 league win against Alavés, becoming the first Swedish player to score a La Liga hat-trick since Henry "Garvis" Carlsson did the same for Atletico Madrid in 1949. Isak scored 10 goals in all competitions the following season, where Real Sociedad ultimately finished 6th in La Liga.

=== Newcastle United ===
==== 2022–23: Record transfer ====
On 26 August 2022, Isak signed for Premier League club Newcastle United on a six-year contract which initially ran until June 2028. On 31 August, he scored a goal on his debut and was named man of the match in a 2–1 defeat against Liverpool at Anfield. Following a 1–1 draw with Bournemouth, where he scored a penalty, Isak was sidelined for 16 competitive matches due to a hamstring injury,. He returned to the squad to play the first half in the FA Cup third round tie to Sheffield Wednesday.

On 15 January 2023, he scored his first goal after the injury in the 89th minute in a 1–0 victory over Fulham. Isak scored his first brace for Newcastle on 17 March in a 2–1 away victory against Nottingham Forest, the second goal being a penalty in stoppage time to win the game. On 23 April, he scored another brace within two minutes in a 6–1 win over Tottenham Hotspur. Five days later, he dribbled past three Everton defenders to cross the ball, with a deflection off James Tarkowski, to Jacob Murphy who scored the last goal in a 4–1 away victory, which urged his manager Eddie Howe to discuss comparisons between him and Thierry Henry.

==== 2023–25: Sustained success and departure ====
On 12 August 2023, Isak scored a brace in a 5–1 win over Aston Villa in Newcastle's first match of the 2023–24 season. On 27 September, he scored the only goal in a 1–0 victory over Manchester City in the EFL Cup, his club's first win against the latter in the last 11 meetings. On 25 November, Isak scored a goal in a 4–1 win over Chelsea, following his recovery from a groin injury. Three days later, he scored his first Champions League goal to grant his club a 1–0 away lead against Paris Saint-Germain, in a match which ended in a 1–1 draw following a controversial penalty scored by the Parisians in stoppage time. On 14 April 2024, Isak scored his 16th and 17th goals of the season as Newcastle beat Tottenham 4–0, equalling Zlatan Ibrahimovic's record for most goals by a Swede in a Premier League season. He then broke the record in a 5–1 win against Sheffield United on 28 April where he scored a brace at St James' Park. He finished his second season at the club as their top scorer with 21 league goals, only behind Erling Haaland and Cole Palmer in the league.

On 21 December 2024, Isak scored his first hat-trick for Newcastle in a 4–0 win at Ipswich Town, making him the first Swedish player to score a hat-trick in the league since Freddie Ljungberg for Arsenal in May 2003. Isak's opening goal, scored in 25.95 seconds from kick-off, was also the fastest away goal for Newcastle United in the Premier League. On 10 January 2025, Isak was voted the Premier League Player of the Month for December, after scoring eight goals and providing two assists throughout the month, as well as scoring in six consecutive games. This made him the first Swedish player since Zlatan Ibrahimovic in December 2016 to win the award, and the fourth Swede to win it. He was also handed the December Goal of the Month for a strike against Liverpool in a 3–3 draw. On 23 February, he scored his 50th Premier League goal, marking the occasion with a brace in Newcastle's 4–3 victory over Nottingham Forest. A month later, on 16 March, he netted a goal in a 2–1 victory over Liverpool in the EFL Cup final, securing his club's first domestic title since 1955.

On 20 June, it was announced that Isak was one of six nominees for the PFA Players' Player of the Year. On 24 July, it was reported that Isak had informed Newcastle that he wished to explore a move away from the club. Two days later, on 26 July, he was seen training alone at his former club Real Sociedad to aid his recovery from a thigh injury, and he did not accompany Newcastle on their pre-season tour of Asia. On 14 August, he went on strike, making himself unavailable for Newcastle's season opener against Aston Villa. On 19 August, Isak issued a public statement via his Instagram, confirming his desire to leave Newcastle, whilst also accusing the club of breaking a promise for him to leave, stating: "When promises are broken and trust is lost, the relationship can't continue." Newcastle responded to the post a few hours later, denying that any commitment allowing Isak to leave the club that summer had been made, and also expressing their desire for Isak to remain.

=== Liverpool ===
On 1 September 2025, Liverpool announced the signing of Isak on a long-term contract for a British-record fee, reported to be £125 million, making it the third-most expensive transfer of all time. He was left out of the matchday squad against Burnley on 14 September, with manager Arne Slot blaming his lack of match fitness. Isak played his first match for the club on 17 September in a 3–2 UEFA Champions League win against Atlético Madrid. On 23 September, he scored his first goal for Liverpool, the opening goal in a 2–1 win against Southampton in the EFL Cup. On 30 November, he scored his first league goal for the club in a 2–0 victory over West Ham United at the London Stadium.

On 18 December 2025, he was awarded the Swedish Golden Ball Award. On 20 December 2025, Isak scored a goal in a Premier League victory against Tottenham Hotspur, but suffered an injury after defender Micky van de Ven tackled him when he took the shot away. He underwent a surgery a couple of days later on an ankle injury and fibula fracture.

== International career ==
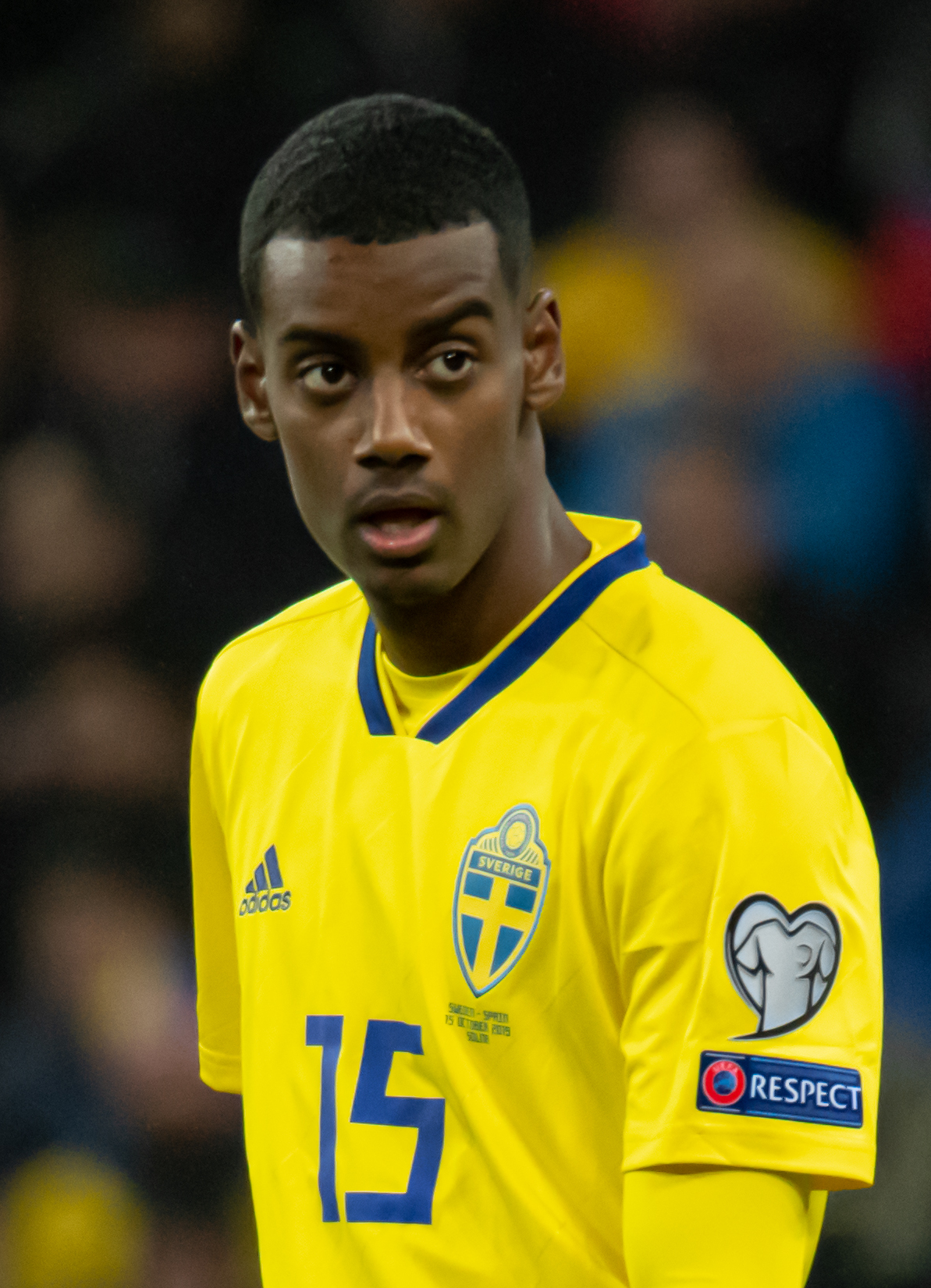
Isak playing for Sweden in 2019

Isak played for youth Swedish national teams in the U-16 to U-21 categories. He was called up to the Sweden national team for the friendly matches against Ivory Coast on 8 January 2017 and Slovakia on 12 January. He made his debut against the Ivory Coast, coming on for Per Frick in the 62nd minute of a 1–2 loss. He started the second game against Slovakia, scoring the first goal in a 6–0 win in the 19th minute, becoming the youngest goalscorer ever in the history of the Sweden national team.

On 23 March 2019, Isak made his first competitive appearance for Sweden, when he replaced Robin Quaison in the 88th minute in a UEFA Euro 2020 qualifying game against Romania, which Sweden won 2–1. Isak scored his first competitive goal for Sweden on 7 June, when Sweden beat Malta in a UEFA Euro 2020 qualifying game at Friends Arena in Stockholm, Sweden. Isak scored the last goal in a 3–0 win.

Isak was called up for a major tournament for the first time when he was included in Sweden's 26-man squad for UEFA Euro 2020.

On 11 May 2026, Isak was named in the Sweden squad for the 2026 FIFA World Cup by head coach Graham Potter. He scored his first World Cup goal to make it 2–0 in their opener against Tunisia and assisted two others in an eventual 5–1 rout. After the game, he was named player of the match.

== Career statistics ==
=== Club ===
As of match played 22 November 2026

Appearances and goals by club, season and competition
Club	Season	League			National cup (Note: Includes Swedish Cup, DFB-Pokal, KNVB Cup, Copa del Rey, FA Cup)		League cup (Note: Includes EFL Cup)		Europe		Other		Total	
Club	Season	Division	Apps	Goals	Apps	Goals	Apps	Goals	Apps	Goals	Apps	Goals	Apps	Goals
AIK	2016	Allsvenskan	24	10	2	3	—		3 (Note: Appearances in UEFA Europa League)	0	—		29	13
Borussia Dortmund II	2016–17	Regionalliga West	1	0	—		—		—		—		1	0
Borussia Dortmund II	2018–19	Regionalliga West	11	5	—		—		—		—		11	5
Borussia Dortmund II	Total		12	5	—		—		—		—		12	5
Borussia Dortmund	2016–17	Bundesliga	0	0	1	0	—		0	0	0	0	1	0
Borussia Dortmund	2017–18	Bundesliga	5	0	3	1	—		4 (Note: One appearance in UEFA Champions League, three appearances in UEFA Europa League)	0	0	0	12	1
Borussia Dortmund	Total		5	0	4	1	—		4	0	0	0	13	1
Willem II (loan)	2018–19	Eredivisie	16	13	2	1	—		—		—		18	14
Real Sociedad	2019–20	La Liga	37	9	8 (Note: Includes appearance in 2020 Copa del Rey final (played in 2021))	7	—		—		—		45	16
Real Sociedad	2020–21	La Liga	34	17	1	0	—		8	0	1 (Note: Appearance in Supercopa de España)	0	44	17
Real Sociedad	2021–22	La Liga	32	6	3	1	—		6	3	—		41	10
Real Sociedad	2022–23	La Liga	2	1	—		—		—		—		2	1
Real Sociedad	Total		105	33	12	8	—		14	3	1	0	132	44
Newcastle United	2022–23	Premier League	22	10	1	0	4	0	—		—		27	10
Newcastle United	2023–24	Premier League	30	21	4	2	1	1	5 (Note: Appearances in UEFA Champions League)	1	—		40	25
Newcastle United	2024–25	Premier League	34	23	2	1	6	3	—		—		42	27
Newcastle United	Total		86	54	7	3	11	4	5	1	—		109	62
Liverpool	2025–26	Premier League	14	3	0	0	1	1	7	0	—		22	4
Liverpool	2026–27	Premier League	10	7	0	0	2	0	3	1	—		15	8
Liverpool	Total		24	10	0	0	3	1	10	1	—		37	12
Career total			272	125	27	16	14	5	36	5	1	0	349	151

=== International ===
As of match played 14 November 2026

Appearances and goals by national team and year
National team	Year	Apps	Goals
Sweden	2017	2	1
Sweden	2018	0	0
Sweden	2019	10	3
Sweden	2020	6	1
Sweden	2021	14	4
Sweden	2022	5	0
Sweden	2023	5	1
Sweden	2024	8	5
Sweden	2025	6	1
Sweden	2026	8	3
Total		64	19

As of match played 14 November 2026
Scores and results list Sweden's goal tally first.

List of international goals scored by Alexander Isak
No.	Date	Venue	Cap	Opponent	Score	Result	Competition
1	12 January 2017	Armed Forces Stadium, Abu Dhabi, United Arab Emirates	2	Slovakia	1–0	6–0	Friendly
2	7 June 2019	Friends Arena, Solna, Sweden	5	Malta	3–0	3–0	UEFA Euro 2020 qualifying
3	5 September 2019	Tórsvøllur, Tórshavn, Faroe Islands	7	Faroe Islands	1–0	4–0	UEFA Euro 2020 qualifying
4	5 September 2019	Tórsvøllur, Tórshavn, Faroe Islands	7	Faroe Islands	2–0	4–0	UEFA Euro 2020 qualifying
5	8 October 2020	VEB Arena, Moscow, Russia	14	Russia	1–0	2–1	Friendly
6	28 March 2021	Fadil Vokrri Stadium, Pristina, Kosovo	20	Kosovo	2–0	3–0	2022 FIFA World Cup qualification
7	2 September 2021	Friends Arena, Solna, Sweden	27	Spain	1–1	2–1	2022 FIFA World Cup qualification
8	9 October 2021	Friends Arena, Solna, Sweden	29	Kosovo	2–0	3–0	2022 FIFA World Cup qualification
9	12 October 2021	Friends Arena, Solna, Sweden	30	Greece	2–0	2–0	2022 FIFA World Cup qualification
10	9 September 2023	Lilleküla Stadium, Tallinn, Estonia	41	Estonia	3–0	5–0	UEFA Euro 2024 qualifying
11	5 June 2024	Parken Stadium, Copenhagen, Denmark	45	Denmark	1–1	1–2	Friendly
12	5 September 2024	Tofiq Bahramov Republican Stadium, Baku, Azerbaijan	47	Azerbaijan	1–0	3–1	2024–25 UEFA Nations League C
13	5 September 2024	Tofiq Bahramov Republican Stadium, Baku, Azerbaijan	47	Azerbaijan	2–0	3–1	2024–25 UEFA Nations League C
14	8 September 2024	Strawberry Arena, Solna, Sweden	48	Estonia	2–0	3–0	2024–25 UEFA Nations League C
15	16 November 2024	Strawberry Arena, Solna, Sweden	49	Slovakia	2–1	2–1	2024–25 UEFA Nations League C
16	25 March 2025	Strawberry Arena, Solna, Sweden	52	Northern Ireland	4–0	5–1	Friendly
17	1 June 2026	Ullevaal Stadion, Oslo, Norway	57	Norway	1–3	1–3	Friendly
18	14 June 2026	Estadio BBVA, Guadelupe, Mexico	59	Tunisia	2–0	5–1	2026 FIFA World Cup
19	25 September 2026	Strawberry Arena, Solna, Sweden	63	Romania	1–0	2–1	2026–27 UEFA Nations League B

== Honours ==
Borussia Dortmund

- DFB-Pokal: 2016–17

Willem II

- KNVB Cup runner-up: 2018–19

Real Sociedad

- Copa del Rey: 2019–20

Newcastle United

- EFL Cup: 2024–25; runner-up: 2022–23

Individual

- Allsvenskan Newcomer of the Year: 2016
- Allsvenskan Player of the Month: September 2016
- Copa del Rey top scorer: 2019–20
- Eredivisie Talent of the Month: March 2019
- Swedish Forward of the Year: 2021
- Premier League Player of the Month: December 2024
- Premier League Goal of the Month: December 2024
- Premier League Most Powerful Goal: 2024–25
- Premier League Fan Team of the Season: 2024–25
- The Athletic Premier League Team of the Season: 2024–25
- PFA Team of the Year: 2024–25 Premier League
- Guldbollen: 2025
