= Adin Bukva =

Swedish footballer

Personal information
- Date of birth: 11 January 1998 (age 28)
- Place of birth: Norrköping, Sweden
- Height: 1.90 m (6 ft 3 in)
- Position: Forward

Team information
- Current team: San Luca

Youth career
- 2003–2016: IFK Norrköping

Senior career*
Years	Team	Apps	(Gls)
2016–2018	IFK Norrköping	3	(0)
2017	→ Husqvarna FF (loan)	0	(0)
2017	→ IF Sylvia (loan)	3	(0)
2018	→ Åtvidabergs FF (loan)	6	(0)
2018–2019	Smedby AIS	0	(0)
2019–2020	Gozzano	20	(4)
2020–2021	Follonica Gavorrano	2	(0)
2021	Cittanovese	6	(1)
2021–2022	Martina	5	(0)
2023	Fezzanese	7	(1)
2023–	San Luca	2	(2)

International career
2014	Sweden U17	2	(2)
2016	Sweden U19	4	(1)
- * Club domestic league appearances and goals as of 4 October 2023

Adin Bukva (born 11 January 1998) is a Swedish footballer who plays as a forward for Italian Serie D club San Luca.

== Club career ==
In August 2018, he signed with Smedby AIS.

On 9 August 2019, he moved to the Italian third-tier Serie C club Gozzano. Bukva scored four goals in 20 matches during the 2019–20 season when Gozzano were relegated from Serie C.

In October 2020, Bukva was signed by Serie D club Follonica Gavorrano. He made only two appearances for the club in the fall of 2020. In September 2021, Bukva joined Serie D club Cittanova. After two months at the club, he moved on to Martina.
