= List of AIK Fotboll players =

This list is about AIK players with at least 100 league appearances. For a list of all AIK players with a Wikipedia article, see Category:AIK Fotboll players. For the current AIK first-team squad, see First-team squad.

This is a list of AIK players with at least 100 league appearances.

== Players ==
Matches of current players as of 7 March 2015.

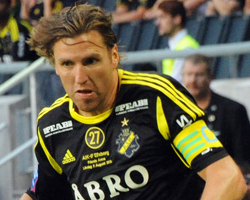
Nils-Eric Johansson has made 212 league appearances for AIK.

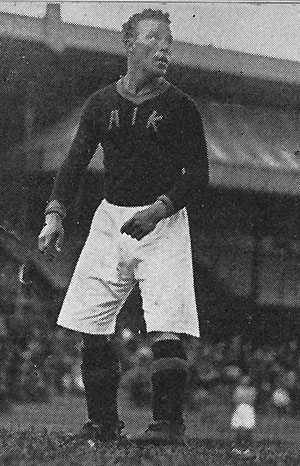
Per Kaufeldt has made 201 league appearances for AIK.

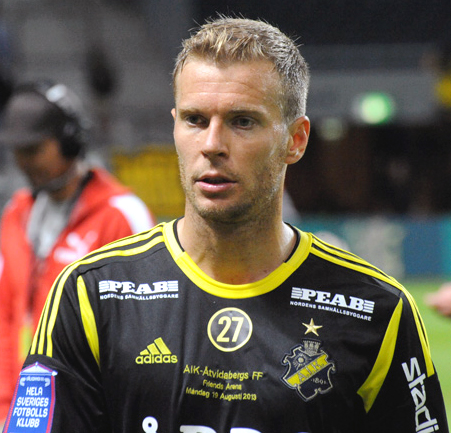
Per Karlsson has made 173 league appearances for AIK.

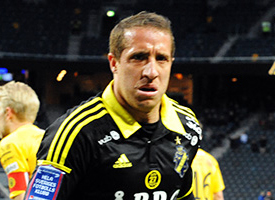
Kenny Pavey has made 145 league appearances for AIK.

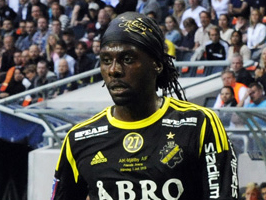
Martin Kayongo-Mutumba has made 131 league appearances for AIK.

Name	Nationality	Position	AIK career	League apps	League goals	Total apps	Total goals
Gustav Sjöberg	Sweden		1932–1950	321	0		
Daniel Tjernström	Sweden	MF	1999–2013	305	16		
Göran Göransson	Sweden		1974–1990	269	13		
Sven Dahlqvist	Sweden		1975–1987	256	38		
Börje Leander	Sweden		1938–1953	249	39		
Gary Sundgren	Sweden	DF	1988–1997; 2002–2003	246	14		
Sven Andersson	Sweden		1928–1940	235	28		
Krister Nordin	Sweden	MF	1992–1999; 2002–2004	233	42		
Björn Kindlund	Sweden	DF	1981–1993	227	27		
Erik Persson	Sweden	MF	1929–1942	222	102		
Nils-Eric Johansson	Sweden	DF	2007–	212	11		
Thomas Lagerlöf	Sweden		1990–2001	208	15		
Per Kaufeldt	Sweden		1920–1934	201	146		
Erik Almgren	Sweden	MF	1934–1944	197	4		
Per Karlsson	Sweden	DF	2003–2005; 2008–	173	0		
Mats Rubarth	Sweden	MF	2001–2008	154	21		
Björn Anlert	Sweden		1954–1966	149	6		
Kenny Pavey	England	MF	2006–2011; 2014–	145	16		
Bengt Anlert	Sweden		1953–1961	143	7		
Pascal Simpson	Sweden	MF	1991–1998	141	43		
Johan Mjällby	Sweden	DF	1989–1998; 2006	136	8		
Martin Kayongo-Mutumba	Uganda	MF	2002–2003; 2009–2010; 2011–2013	131	10		
Kurt Andersson	Sweden	MF	1957–1961; 1968–1971	128	45		
Magnus Hedman	Sweden	GK	1990–1997	127	0		
Jyrki Nieminen	Finland	FW	1979–1984	120	22		
Nebojša Novaković	Sweden	FW	1997–2001	104	27		
Stefan Ishizaki	Sweden	FW	1999–2003; 2004	103	17		
Vadym Yevtushenko	Ukraine	MF	1989–1993	102	19		
Ola Andersson	Sweden	MF	1995–2000	102	2		
