= Ahmed Yasin (footballer) =

Iraqi footballer (born 1991)

- Yasin with AIK in 2016

Personal information
- Full name: Ahmed Yasin Ghani Mousa
- Date of birth: 22 April 1991 (age 35)
- Place of birth: Baghdad, Iraq
- Height: 1.84 m (6 ft 0 in)
- Positions: Winger; attacking midfielder

Team information
- Current team: Örebro
- Number: 99

Youth career
- 2007–2010: BK Forward

Senior career*
| Years | Team | Apps | (Gls) |
| 2009–2011 | BK Forward | 42 | (7) |
| 2011–2015 | Örebro | 89 | (17) |
| 2015–2016 | AGF | 17 | (1) |
| 2016–2017 | AIK | 32 | (2) |
| 2017 | → Muaither (loan) | 13 | (4) |
| 2017 | → Häcken (loan) | 15 | (7) |
| 2018–2019 | Al-Khor | 14 | (1) |
| 2019–2020 | Häcken | 55 | (5) |
| 2020–2021 | Denizlispor | 7 | (0) |
| 2021–2023 | Örebro | 29 | (5) |
| 2023–2024 | Al-Kholood | 52 | (11) |
| 2024 | Örebro | 16 | (4) |
| 2024–2025 | Zakho | 18 | (2) |
| 2025– | Örebro | 42 | (14) |

International career^{‡}
| 2011–2012 | Iraq U23 | 5 | (0) |
| 2012– | Iraq | 71 | (6) |
- * Club domestic league appearances and goals as of 12 November 2026 ‡ National team caps and goals as of 6 October 2026

Ahmed Yasin Ghani Mousa (Arabic: أَحْمَد يَاسِين غَنِيّ مُوسَى, [ˈjaːsiːn]; born 22 April 1991), known as Ahmed Yasin (sometimes romanized as Yaseen), is an Iraqi footballer who plays for Örebro and the Iraq national team. He joined the Iraqi national team for first time in 2012, after having played for the Iraq U23 team.

== Club career ==
=== Early career ===
Ahmed Yasin Ghani Mousa is the youngest of four footballing brothers. He had been playing football from the age of five, looking up to his brothers – Salar, Araz and Zeid – who, like their younger sibling, had all played for Örebro SK, where Ahmed started playing his youth football. He first learnt football from his brother Salar, who was a football player and a coach.

=== BK Forward ===
Ahmed started his career in football by joining BK Forward in 2007 at the age of sixteen, where his eldest brother Salar was a coach for one of their youth teams. BK Forward in 2007, a Swedish club in the city of Örebro which plays in the Swedish third tier. He started in the youth teams at the club, and after a year he made his debut with the first team. He broke into the first team in 2009 and made a total of 42 appearances scoring seven goals for the club and even captained the club's futsal team to the 2010 Mariedal Cup, where he netted two goals in the final. After the 2009 season, he was close to signing with Halmstad, and clubs from Portugal.

==== Futsal team ====
Ahmed was the captain of the futsal team of BK Forward. Under his direction, BK Forward won the Mariedal Cup in 2010. Ahmed was one of the best players of the tournament, scoring many goals, including two in the final.

=== Örebro SK ===
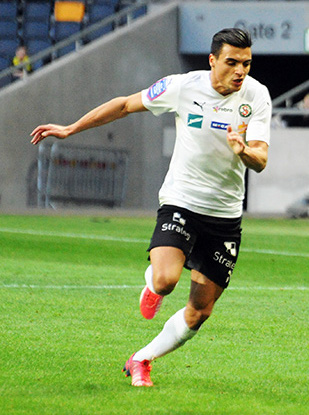
Yasin playing for Örebro SK in 2015.

In 2010, aged 19, Ahmed signed a 4-year contract with Örebro SK. He made his official debut in the first team on 6 May 2011, against Kalmar FF in the Allsvenskan.

In his first season, he played six games in Allsvenskan and one in the Svenska Cupen. He made his European debut on 21 July against FK Sarajevo. Ahmed played 10 minutes and his team lost the game with 2–0.

Ahmed scored his first goal for Örebro in the Svenska Cupen, he scored the equalizer in the 12th minute against Ljungskile SK. He also played more than 15 friendly matches, scoring more than 5 unofficial goals.

Despite only playing four times in his first season, he made his breakthrough in his second season, and playing more games in 2012. He returned to hometown club Örebro SK in 2010 and his career went from strength to strength, setting a target each year and reaching it by the end of the season. When he first joined Örebro SK, it took the talented winger a while to settle in the first team and in his first season he made only four brief substitute appearances, a total of 54 minutes of football! He broke into the first team half-way through the 2011–12 season in the Allsvenskan starting eleven matches.

However the club were relegated into the second tier of Swedish football, Superettan but rather than obstructing his career, the stint in the second division was the making of the player. Ahmed was a key factor in the team's promotion back to the top flight, appearing 29 times, scoring six goals and assisting for seven goals as he became a regular on the right wing under coach Per-Ola Ljung, the man who gave him his start at the club.

He played 29 games out of 30 in the Allsvenskan for Örebro SK in the 2014 season, scoring two goals and assisting for five goals, and in the 2015 season had started each of Örebro's 13 league games, a major reason why the Swedish club were keen to keep hold of him for next season. But with only six months left on his contract, Ahmed left for Denmark.

=== AGF ===
In the summer of 2015, Ahmed joined Aarhus Gymnastikforening In the Danish Superliga. Ahmed failed to adopt quickly enough in Denmark, scoring only once and two assist in 17 league appearances, he returned to Sweden mid-season, this time with AIK.

=== AIK ===
In the winter 2016, Ahmed returned to the Swedish Allsvenskan, Yasin scored two goal and a five assist in 23 games for AIK in league and Cup. and the club finished second place in the league.

==== Loan to Muaither ====
Ahmed joined Qatari club Muaither on a 4-month loan following the end of the Swedish league. Ahmed expressed his wish to maintain his fitness and to move to an area with a warmer weather. Ahmed made his debut on 4 January against Lekhwiya. He scored his first and second goal for his club on 10 February as he helped Muaither come back from 2–0 down to draw 2–2 against Al-Khor. Ahmed Yasin scored four goals and provided a further 6 assists in 13 QSL games for the club, but it was not enough as Muaither finished second to last with 20 points and were relegated from the Qatar Stars League. Yasin confirmed on 24 April 2017, that his time at Qatar was done 5 weeks before his contract expired and he turned back to AIK. He was forced to wait until the registration window on 15 July.

==== Loan to Häcken ====
On 16 July 2017, Ahmed joined the Swedish club Häcken on loan from his parent club AIK. He made his debut the following day against J-Södra in the Swedish Allsvenskan. He was introduced in the second half, and scored 12 minutes later. Yasin scored 7 goal and 4 assist in 15 games for Häcken in league, and the club finished four place in the league.

==== Return to AIK ====
In January 2018, Yasin returned to AIK, on first appearance helped in win team, scored goal against Syrianska in Svenska Cupen.

=== Al Khor ===
On 29 July 2018, Yasin signed for Qatari club Al-Khor until end December 2018. He was there to replace the injured Madson. He made his debut on 4 August in the QSL round one game against Al-Arabi. He left the club in December 2018 after 14 games and 1 goal.

=== Return to Häcken ===
On 29 January 2019 it was confirmed, that Yasin had re-joined BK Häcken on a one-year contract.

=== Denizlispor ===
On 19 January 2021 it was announced that Yasin was going to Turkey and will play for Denizlispor. He signed a contract until 2022, with one more year option.

=== Return to Örebro ===
On 20 August 2021, Yasin returned to Örebro, while rehabbing from an injury.

=== Al-Kholood ===
On 31 December 2022, Yasin joined Saudi First Division club Al-Kholood. In his second season at the club, Yasin made 34 appearances and scored eight goals helping the club earn promotion to the Pro League for the first time in their history.

=== Second Return to Örebro ===
On 15 July 2024, Yasin returned to Örebro.

== International career ==
=== Sweden U17 ===
In 2008, Ahmed was selected to be part of the Swedish Under-17 national football team, but he did not participate in any matches with the team.

=== Iraq Olympic football team ===
Ahmed made his debut for the Iraq Olympic football team on 16 June 2011, in a friendly match against Qatar. He was very important in the game, partly thanks to him Iraq won the game with 2–1. After that match, the coach was impressed by him, and called him up again officially for the team to play in the Olympic qualifiers. He became the best player in the team in the qualifiers. Iraq did not qualify to the 2012 Olympics, due to an administrative punishment from FIFA.

=== Iraq ===
In June 2011 he and some other European-based players, were called up to train with the Iraq national football team by the coach Sidka. They were chosen among forty Iraqi players that play in the European leagues. When he arrived in Iraq he got a lot of attention. He played several friendly matches against Iraqi clubs.

During his stay in Iraq, he also trained with Baghdad based club Al Talaba. They were so impressed by his play that they offered him a contract, but he refused because he already had a contract with Örebro SK and was not willing to leave the Allsvenskan.

In February 2012 after playing very good with the Olympic side, Zico called him up for the game against Singapore, although he was unable to join the team because of a lack of time for preparations.

Later, Ahmed Yasin was named in a 33-man squad list by Zico for a training camp to be help in Turkey in Iraq's preparations for the final round of qualifiers for the 2014 FIFA World Cup to be held in Brazil. He was later dropped ahead of the matches against Jordan and Oman.

On 24 June 2012, Ahmed Yasin made his first international appearance for Iraq's first team in an international friendly game against Lebanon which was part of the 2012 Arab Nations Cup hosted in Saudi Arabia. He came on as a substitute for Karrar Jassim in the 32nd minute of the match. He made his first start for the team in Iraq's match against Sudan.

On 11 September 2012, Ahmed Yasin made his first appearance in the 2014 FIFA World Cup qualifiers against Japan as a starter wearing the number 9 shirt. He played a good match and created several good goalscoring chances, although the match ended in a 1–0 win for Japan.

On 29 December 2014, Yasin was included in Iraq's squad for the 2015 AFC Asian Cup. In the team's third group match, he scored Iraq's second goal as they defeated Palestine 2–0 to qualify for the knockout stage. In the quarter-final match against Iran, Yasin scored Iraq's first goal as they drew 3–3 at Canberra Stadium and eventually prevailed 7–6 on a penalty shootout. In March 2018, he scored the first goals of the national team after lifting the international ban.

== Career statistics ==
=== Club ===
As of 19 January 2021.

| Club | Season | League | | | Cup (Note: Includes Svenska Cupen and Danish Cup matches) | | | Europe (Note: Includes UEFA Europa League matches) | | | Total | | |
| Club | Season | Apps | Goals | Assists | Apps | Goals | Assists | Apps | Goals | Assists | Apps | Goals | Assists |
|---|---|---|---|---|---|---|---|---|---|---|---|---|---|
| Forward | 2008 | 17 | 1 | 3 | — | | | — | | | 17 | 1 | 3 |
| Forward | 2009 | 20 | 4 | 5 | — | | | — | | | 20 | 4 | 5 |
| Forward | 2010 | 5 | 3 | 4 | 1 | 0 | 0 | — | | | 6 | 3 | 4 |
| Forward | Total | 42 | 8 | 12 | 1 | 0 | 0 | — | | | 43 | 8 | 12 |
| Örebro | 2011 | 4 | 0 | 1 | 1 | 1 | 0 | 1 | 0 | 0 | 6 | 1 | 1 |
| Örebro | 2012 | 13 | 0 | 3 | 4 | 2 | 2 | — | | | 17 | 2 | 5 |
| Örebro | 2013 | 29 | 6 | 7 | — | | | — | | | 29 | 6 | 7 |
| Örebro | 2014 | 29 | 2 | 5 | 7 | 0 | 1 | — | | | 36 | 2 | 6 |
| Örebro | 2015 | 14 | 2 | 2 | — | | | — | | | 14 | 2 | 2 |
| Örebro | Total | 89 | 10 | 18 | 12 | 3 | 3 | 1 | 0 | 0 | 102 | 13 | 21 |
| AGF | 2015 | 17 | 1 | 1 | 2 | 0 | 1 | — | | | 19 | 1 | 2 |
| AGF | Total | 17 | 1 | 1 | 2 | 0 | 1 | — | | | 19 | 1 | 2 |
| AIK | 2016 | 18 | 1 | 3 | 5 | 1 | 2 | 4 | 0 | 0 | 27 | 2 | 5 |
| AIK | Total | 18 | 1 | 3 | 5 | 1 | 2 | 4 | 0 | 0 | 27 | 2 | 5 |
| Muaither (loan) | 2017 | 13 | 4 | 5 | 1 | 0 | 0 | — | | | 14 | 4 | 5 |
| Muaither (loan) | Total | 13 | 4 | 5 | 1 | 0 | 0 | — | | | 14 | 4 | 5 |
| Häcken (loan) | 2017 | 15 | 7 | 4 | 0 | 0 | 0 | — | | | 15 | 7 | 4 |
| Häcken (loan) | Total | 15 | 7 | 4 | 0 | 0 | 0 | — | | | 15 | 7 | 4 |
| AIK | 2018 | 14 | 1 | 1 | 5 | 1 | 0 | 2 | 0 | 0 | 21 | 2 | 1 |
| AIK | Total | 14 | 1 | 1 | 5 | 1 | 0 | 2 | 0 | 0 | 21 | 2 | 1 |
| Häcken | 2019 | 27 | 2 | 4 | 0 | 0 | 0 | | | | 27 | 2 | 4 |
| | Total | 27 | 2 | 4 | 0 | 0 | 0 | | | | 27 | 2 | 4 |
| Al-Khor SC | 2018/19 | 14 | 1 | 0 | 0 | 0 | 0 | | | | 14 | 1 | 0 |
| | Total | 14 | 1 | 0 | 0 | 0 | 0 | | | | 14 | 1 | 0 |
| Häcken | 2020 | 28 | 3 | 6 | 4 | 3 | 0 | 2 | 0 | 0 | 34 | 6 | 6 |
| | Total | 28 | 3 | 6 | 4 | 3 | 0 | 2 | 0 | 0 | 34 | 6 | 6 |
| Denizlispor | 2020/21 | | | | | | | | | | | | |
| | Total | | | | | | | | | | | | |
| Career total | | 277 | 38 | 54 | 30 | 8 | 6 | 7 | 0 | 0 | 316 | 46 | 60 |

=== International ===
As of match played 26 March 2024.

Iraq
| Year | Apps | Goals |
|---|---|---|
| 2012 | 14 | 1 |
| 2013 | 7 | 0 |
| 2014 | 8 | 0 |
| 2015 | 11 | 3 |
| 2016 | 5 | 0 |
| 2017 | 7 | 1 |
| 2018 | 3 | 1 |
| 2019 | 5 | 0 |
| 2024 | 2 | 0 |
| Total | 62 | 6 |

==== International goals ====
Scores and results list Iraq's goal tally first.

| Goal | Date | Venue | Opponent | Score | Result | Competition |
|---|---|---|---|---|---|---|
| 1. | 18 December 2012 | Ali Sabah Al-Salem Stadium, Al Farwaniyah | Oman | 2–0 | 2–0 | 2012 WAFF Championship |
| 2. | 20 January 2015 | Canberra Stadium, Canberra | Palestine | 2–0 | 2–0 | 2015 AFC Asian Cup |
| 3. | 23 January 2015 | Canberra Stadium, Canberra | Iran | 1–1 | 3–3 (a.e.t.) (7–6 p) | 2015 AFC Asian Cup |
| 4. | 3 September 2015 | PAS Stadium, Teheran | Chinese Taipei | 3–0 | 5–1 | 2018 FIFA World Cup qualification |
| 5. | 23 March 2017 | PAS Stadium, Teheran | Australia | 1–1 | 1–1 | 2018 FIFA World Cup qualification |
| 6. | 21 March 2018 | Basra Sports City, Basra | Qatar | 1–1 | 2–3 | 2018 International Friendship Championship |

== Personal life ==
Yasin is a Feyli Kurd born on 22 April 1991 in Baghdad in the notable Falastin Street. Ahmed Yasin was only one, when he and his family moved to Sweden. Ahmed started school in Örebro at the age of five. In 2010, after graduating from high school, his family moved back to Iraq.

The Yasin family had lived on the famous Falastin Street in the Iraqi capital, but had first left Baghdad for Sweden in 1987 at the near end of the Iraq-Iran War. A year after the war ended, the Yasin family returned to their home on Palestine Street believing that their future lay in Iraq but less than 18 months later Iraq was dragged into another war with the US and its allies after Saddam ordered the invasion of Kuwait and the following year the Yasin family left Iraq for the final time.

Yasin started playing football at the age of five. His elder brothers – Salar, Araz and Zeid – also played for Örebro SK. In his free time, Yasin enjoys boxing and tennis. He sometimes takes boxing classes by professional boxers. Yasin is fluent in English, Swedish and Arabic.

== Honours ==
=== Club ===
BK Forward

- Mariedal Cup: 2010

Örebro SK

- Superettan Runners-up: 2013
- Atlantic Cup Runners-up: 2014
- Svenska Cupen Runners-up: 2015

AIK

- Allsvenskan Runners-up: 2016

=== International ===
Iraq

- Arab Nations Cup Bronze medalist: 2012
- WAFF Championship Runners-up: 2012
- Arabian Gulf Cup Runners-up: 2013
- AFC Asian Cup Fourth-place: 2015

=== Individual ===
- Nominated by IFFHS for The World's Most Popular Footballer Amongst Currently Active Players in 2012.
- Selected as one of the top 5 popular players in Asia.
- Nominated for the "Best Arabic Player in 2011/ 2012 season" award by AlJazeera Sports Channel.
- Nominated for the "Best football player from in the Arab World" in 2012 season by Sky Polls.
- Chosen as the Best Iraqi professional player for the year 2012 by Kooora website.
- Nominated for the best Arab footballer by Al-Haddaf Algerian newspaper.
- Selected in Superettan's best 11 squad for the year 2013.
- Best goal award for Örebro SK in Superettan 2013 season.
- Allsvenskan Player of the Month Award: August 2017.
