= Per Karlsson (footballer, born 1989) =

Swedish footballer

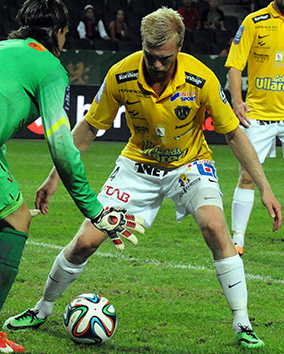
- Karlsson in 2014

Personal information
- Full name: Per Johan Karlsson
- Date of birth: 20 April 1989 (age 37)
- Place of birth: Falkenberg, Sweden
- Height: 1.80 m (5 ft 11 in)
- Position: Centre back

Team information
- Current team: Tvååkers IF
- Number: 5

Youth career
- –2008: Vinbergs IF

Senior career*
Years	Team	Apps	(Gls)
2009–2010	Vinbergs IF	43	(7)
2011–2012	Tvååkers IF	43	(6)
2013–2019	Falkenbergs FF	123	(9)
2020–	Tvååkers IF	24	(2)
- * Club domestic league appearances and goals as of 12:43, 7 February 2021 (UTC)

Per Johan Karlsson (born 20 April 1989) is a Swedish professional footballer who plays for Tvååkers IF as a centre back.

== Career ==
After seven seasons with Falkenbergs FF, Karlsson returned to his former club, Tvååkers IF, in February 2020.
