= Per Karlsson (footballer, born 1986) =

Swedish footballer

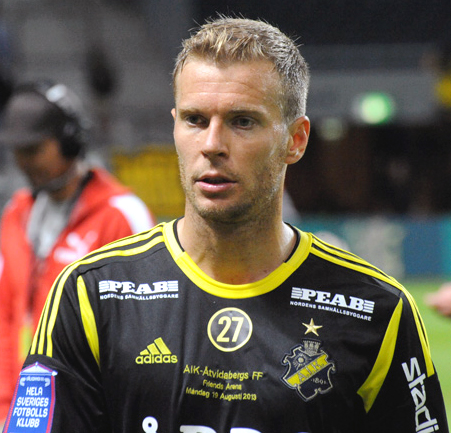

Personal information
- Full name: Per Jonas Karlsson
- Date of birth: 2 January 1986 (age 40)
- Place of birth: Stockholm, Sweden
- Height: 1.85 m (6 ft 1 in)
- Position: Defender

Youth career
- 1991–1997: Vasalund
- 1998–2003: AIK

Senior career*
Years	Team	Apps	(Gls)
2003–2022	AIK	349	(2)
2006	→ Väsby United (loan)	0	(0)
2007	→ Åtvidabergs FF (loan)	27	(1)
Total		376	(3)

International career
2001–2003	Sweden U17	8	(0)
2004–2005	Sweden U19	13	(0)
2007–2009	Sweden U21	15	(0)
2010–2015	Sweden	2	(0)
- * Club domestic league appearances and goals

Per Jonas Karlsson (born 2 January 1986) is a Swedish former professional footballer who played as a defender. Making his senior debut for AIK in 2003, he made a club record 455 appearances for the club and helped the team win the 2009 and 2018 Allsvenskan titles. He won two caps for the Sweden national team between 2010 and 2015.

== Club career ==
He came through the ranks of Solna club Vasalunds IF and was picked up by AIK as a teenager. After coming through the academy at AIK he secured a regular starting-spot at AIK in late 2004, but broke his leg in beginning of 2005 against Väsby United which ruled him out for much of that season. When he became fit again he was loaned out to Väsby United, a feeder club to AIK, for the 2006 season. However, he broke his arm this time and wasn't able to play any matches for them. During the 2007 season he was loaned out to Åtvidabergs FF in Superettan and was finally able to play a whole season. During 2008 he once again became a member of the regular starting eleven at AIK, which he had lost after his leg fracture in 2005.

He played in 26 Allsvenskan games as AIK won the 2009 Allsvenskan. 9 years later, he played in all 30 games as AIK won the 2018 Allsvenskan.

On 15 July 2020 he made his 396th appearance for AIK in a 2020 Allsvenskan 1-0 win against IK Sirius, surpassing Daniel Tjernström at 395 games and setting a club record. On 28 September 2020, Karlsson made his 322nd Allsvenskan appearance, breaking Gustav Sjöberg's record for most Allsvenskan appearances for AIK.

Karlsson retired from professional football after the 2022 Allsvenskan season.

== International career ==
Karlsson was a part of the Sweden U21 squad that advanced to the semifinals of the 2009 UEFA European Under-21 Championship that took place on Swedish home soil, but did not play.

Karlsson made his senior Sweden debut in January 2010 in a friendly game against Oman. He was called up to a 2014 FIFA World Cup qualifier against Germany as a replacement for Jonas Olsson, but did not play. He won his second cap in a friendly against the Ivory Coast in January 2015.

In May 2019, Karlsson was called up to Sweden's UEFA Euro 2020 qualifiers against Malta and Spain, but did not play.

== Personal life ==
He goes by the nickname "Pertan" (pronounced [ˈpæ̂ʈːan]).

== Career statistics ==
=== Club ===
Club	Season	Division	League		Cup		Europe		Total	
Club	Season	Division	Apps	Goals	Apps	Goals	Apps	Goals	Apps	Goals
AIK	2003	Allsvenskan	1	0	0	0	0	0	1	0
AIK	2004	Allsvenskan	12	0	0	0	—		12	0
AIK	2005	Superettan	3	0	0	0	—		3	0
Väsby United (loan)	2006	Superettan	0	0	0	0	—		0	0
Åtvidabergs FF (loan)	2007	Allsvenskan	27	1	0	0	—		27	1
AIK	2008	Allsvenskan	25	0	0	0	—		25	0
AIK	2009	Allsvenskan	26	0	5	0	—		31	0
AIK	2010	Allsvenskan	21	0	3	0	6	0	30	0
AIK	2011	Allsvenskan	6	0	1	0	—		7	0
AIK	2012	Allsvenskan	23	0	0	0	11	0	34	0
AIK	2013	Allsvenskan	30	0	3	0	—		33	0
AIK	2014	Allsvenskan	26	0	1	0	4	0	31	0
AIK	2015	Allsvenskan	24	0	1	0	3	0	28	0
AIK	2016	Allsvenskan	26	0	1	0	4	0	31	0
AIK	2017	Allsvenskan	27	1	4	1	5	0	36	2
AIK	2018	Allsvenskan	30	0	4	0	4	0	38	0
AIK	2019	Allsvenskan	28	0	4	0	7	1	39	1
AIK	2020	Allsvenskan	26	1	4	0	—		30	1
AIK	2021	Allsvenskan	8	0	2	0	—		10	0
AIK	2022	Allsvenskan	7	0	2	0	—		9	0
Career Total			376	3	35	1	44	1	455	5

=== International ===
Appearances and goals by national team and year

National team	Year	Apps	Goals
Sweden	2010	1	0
Sweden	2011	0	0
Sweden	2012	0	0
Sweden	2013	0	0
Sweden	2014	0	0
Sweden	2015	1	0
Total		2	0

== Honours ==
AIK

- Allsvenskan: 2009, 2018
- Svenska Cupen: 2009
- Svenska Supercupen: 2010

Individual

- Allsvenskan Defender of the Year: 2013, 2018

=== Records ===
- Most appearances for AIK: 455
- Most Allsvenskan appearances for AIK: 373
